= Resistance (creativity) =

Concept created by Steven Pressfield

Resistance is a concept created by American novelist Steven Pressfield that illustrates the universal force that he claims acts against human creativity. It was first described in his non-fiction book The War of Art and elaborated in the follow-up books Do The Work and Turning Pro, and in other essays. It is also a recurring theme in some of his fiction novels such as The Legend of Bagger Vance and The Virtues of War.

Resistance is described in a mythical fashion as a universal force that has one sole mission: to keep things as they are. Pressfield claims that Resistance does not have a personal vendetta against anyone, rather it is simply trying to accomplish its only mission. It is the force that will stop an individual's creative activity through any means necessary, whether it be rationalizing, inspiring fear and anxiety, emphasizing other distractions that require attention, raising the voice of an inner critic, and much more. It will use any tool to stop creation flowing from an individual, no matter what field the creation is in.

Pressfield goes on to claim that Resistance is the most dangerous element to one's life and dreams since its sole mission is to sabotage aspirations. He explains steps that human beings can take to overcome this force and keep it subdued so that they can create to their fullest potential, although Resistance is never fully gone.

Pressfield's concept of Resistance has been cited by authors such as Seth Godin, David M. Kelley and Tom Kelley, Eric Liu and the Lincoln Center Institute, Robert Kiyosaki and Sharon Lechter, and Gina Trapani.

== Criticism ==
Psychologist Frederick Heide has cited Pressfield's book The War of Art and questioned whether "fighting" Resistance is always a helpful metaphor; Heide suggested that such agonistic metaphors could end up "ironically perpetuating the resistance it predicts." Nevertheless, Heide noted, such an agonistic approach to resistance remains widespread in psychotherapeutic thinking. Heide cites a scholarly article that points to some alternative nonagonistic strategies for working with resistance in relational psychoanalytic psychotherapy, personal construct therapy, narrative therapy, motivational interviewing, process-experiential therapy, and coherence therapy.

== See also ==
- Decisional balance sheet
- The Establishment
- Immunity to change
- Procrastination
- Psychological resistance
- Sin
