= Midas Touch (book) =

2011 book by Donald Trump and Robert Kiyosaki

- Book cover
- Authors: Donald Trump; Robert Kiyosaki
- Language: English
- Subject: Personal finance
- Publisher: Plata Publishing
- Publication date: 2011
- Publication place: United States
- Media type: Print (Hardcover)
- Pages: 240
- ISBN: 978-1612680958
- OCLC: 701019420
- Preceded by: Why We Want You to be Rich (2006)
- Followed by: Time to Get Tough (2011)
- Website: Official website

Midas Touch: Why Some Entrepreneurs Get Rich — And Why Most Don't is a non-fiction book about personal finance, co-authored by Donald Trump and Robert Kiyosaki. The book was published in hardcover format in 2011. The coauthors became familiar with each other through mutual work at The Learning Annex, and The Art of the Deal. Trump was impressed by Kiyosaki's writing success with Rich Dad Poor Dad. The coauthors then wrote Why We Want You to be Rich together in 2006, and followed it up with Midas Touch in 2011.

Trump and Kiyosaki intersperse financial lessons with personal anecdotes from their respective careers. They elaborate on points previously raised in Why We Want You to be Rich, and criticize a dearth of financial literacy education in the U.S. system. The authors warn of the middle-class squeeze and the harm this will cause to the American middle class. They praise entrepreneurship and advise aspiring business owners to embrace failure and learn from it. Trump and Kiyosaki end the book by extolling the economic benefits of immigration to the United States.

The book received a positive review from Publishers Weekly, which called Trump and Kiyosaki, "the gold standard of the entrepreneurial spirit". The review called the book a "galvanizing narrative", and "an impassioned argument for business self-actualization". Kirkus Reviews praised the combination of Trump and Kiyosaki, "the authors complement each other surprisingly well". In its overall assessment, Kirkus Reviews concluded the book was "Serviceable but undermined by its political proselytizing." The Intercept called multi-level marketing a form of pyramid scheme and lamented the authors' recommendation of the tactic. Both BuzzFeed News and Business Insider contrasted advice in the book with messages from the Donald Trump presidential campaign, 2016.

== Summary ==
Midas Touch elaborates on points made by Trump and Kiyosaki in their prior work Why We Want You to be Rich, implementation of which they claim would improve the American economy. They lament the lack of financial literacy provided by the U.S. education structure and argue students should be taught how to become business owners instead of employees. The current model instructs students to achieve academic excellence through risk avoidance, but they claim students who take risks will learn from their mistakes.

Kiyosaki expands on the idea of taking risk, advising that financial success is not something which can be learned in an academic setting. He emphasizes a different set of skills are needed to be a successful business owner, telling readers the path to entrepreneurial success is learned through multiple failures. Trump agrees, pointing out that students who succeed academically fear failure and are thus not always those who succeed at entrepreneurship. Trump compares this educational model to the business sector and differentiates between practical intelligence and academic intelligence.

Trump and Kiyosaki emphasize that business owners help create opportunity for others while federal bureaucracy does not have the power to create meaningful employment. Their strategy for success is elaborated upon in five segments which the authors refer to as the "Midas Touch" formula. Requisite parts of learning how to become a good business owner include networking skills, brand name value, concentration to the task at hand, mental fortitude, and innumerable lesser characteristics. The authors advise that the middle-class squeeze creates an opportunity for readers to gain wealth.

The authors illustrate their arguments with anecdotes throughout the work. Kiyosaki discusses his military contributions during the Vietnam War, an unsuccessful business venture attempting to sell wallets made out of Velcro, his increased success and popularity after an appearance on The Oprah Winfrey Show, and his surprise when he found out one of his businesses used a sweatshop. Trump recounts adventures experienced while engaged in real estate investing in Manhattan and what it was like to star in the television program The Apprentice.

Trump and Kiyosaki conclude the book by embracing the phenomenon of entrepreneurs created through immigration to the United States, pointing out that for hundreds of years immigrants came through Ellis Island seeking economic opportunities. The conclusion emphasizes the hardship some immigrants experience prior to arrival in the U.S., acknowledging their effort to create a better life for their families as Americans. Trump and Kiyosaki assert immigrants to the U.S. are especially motivated to find economic success and are willing to take virtually any job to start improving their lives.

== Composition and publication ==
Trump and Kiyosaki

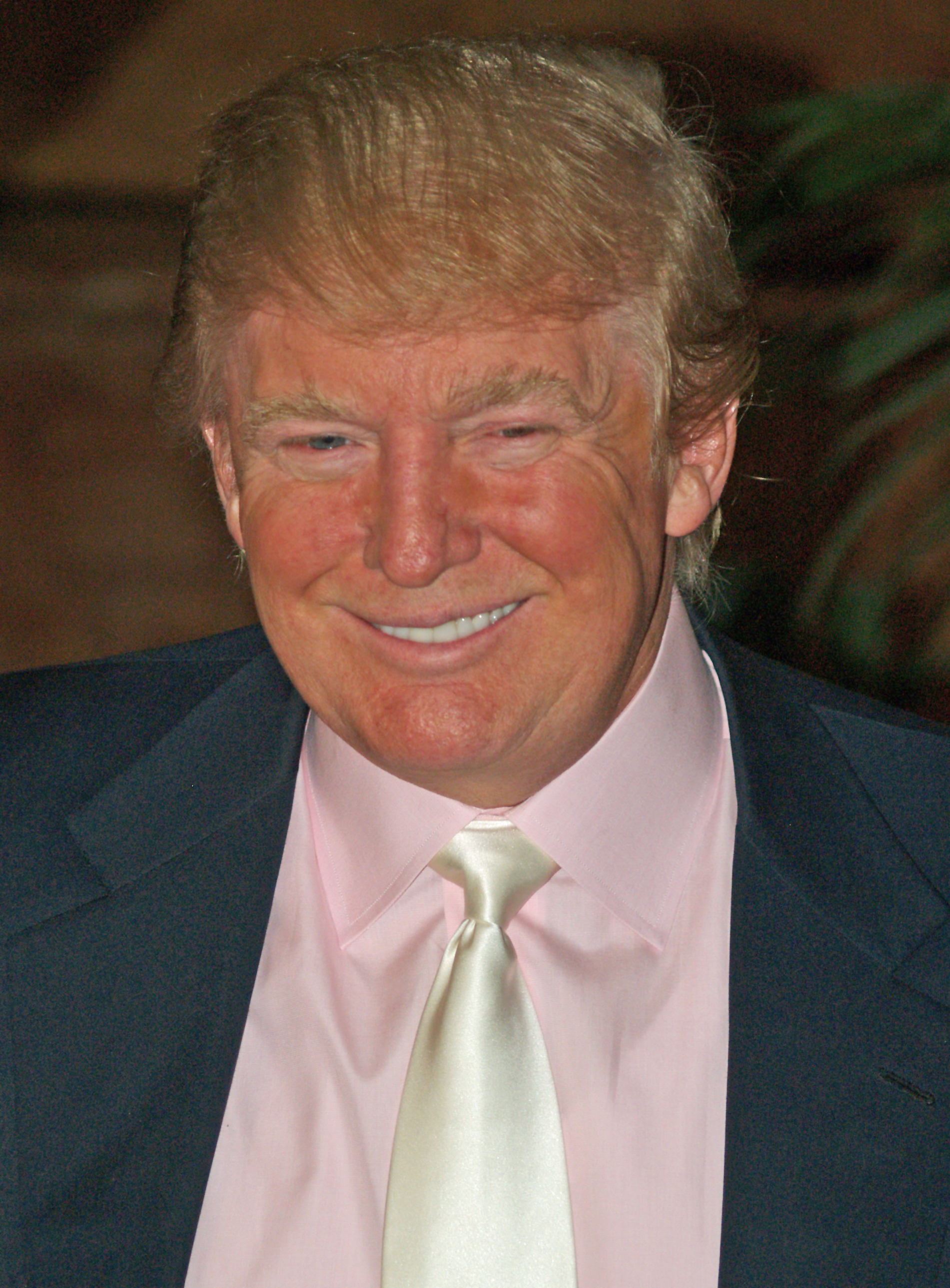
Donald Trump

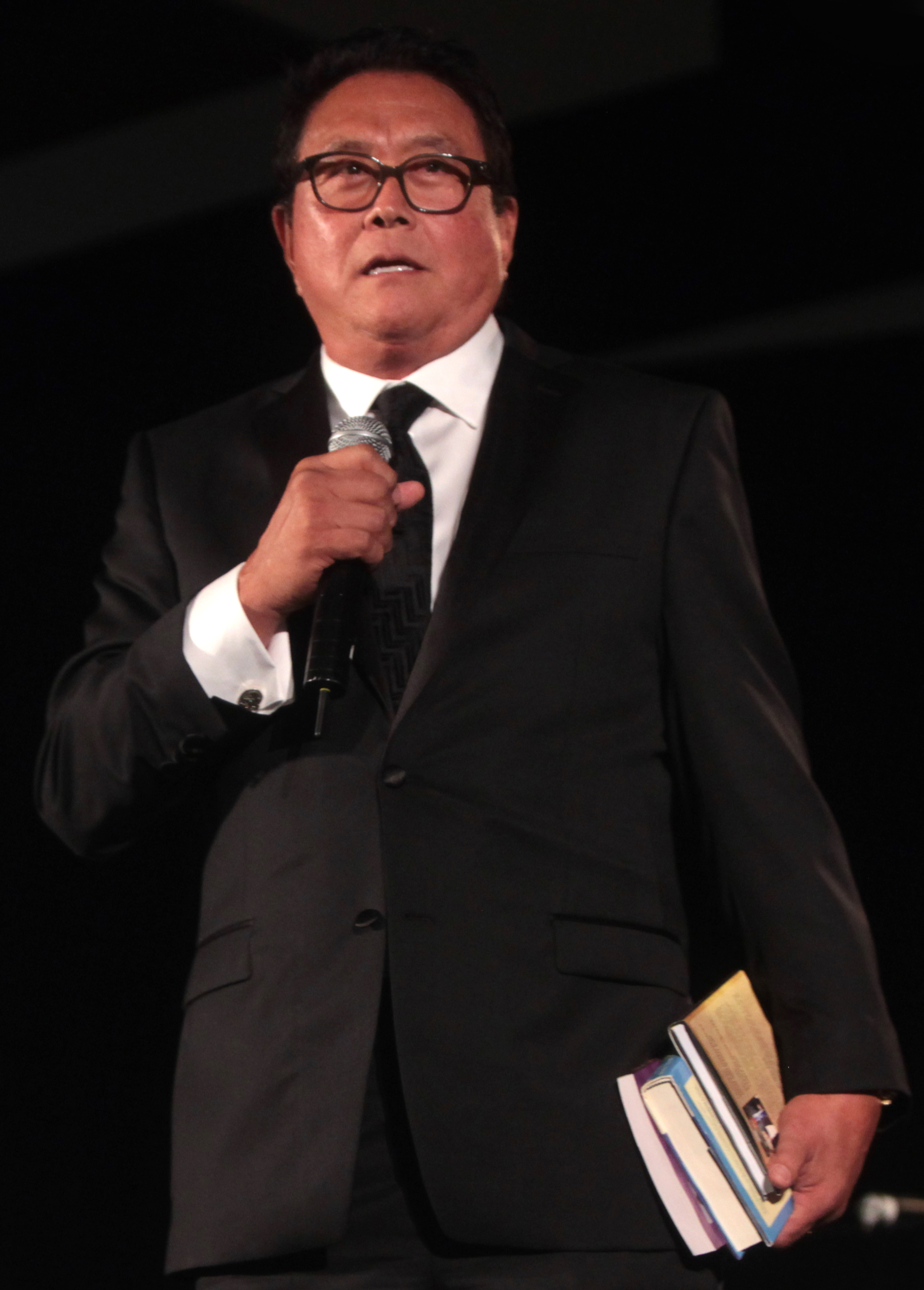
Robert Kiyosaki

Before publishing this book, Donald Trump was an established businessman in real estate development and wrote The Art of the Deal in 1987. His cowriter, Robert Kiyosaki, authored the 1997 the New York Times best seller Rich Dad Poor Dad. They became familiar with each other through encounters at The Learning Annex company. Trump was motivated to work with Kiyosaki by the past success of their respective books. Together, they published Why We Want You to be Rich in 2006 as a private business venture and formed the new company Rich Press as a partnership. Trump and Kiyosaki next collaborated on Midas Touch to discuss the declining American middle class.

In a 2011 interview with Forbes, Trump said he wanted to collaborate with Kiyosaki because he was intelligent and had been successful in business and writing ventures. Kiyosaki was also interviewed by Forbes in 2011 and said he had to gain entrepreneurship skills through experience while Trump's skills were innate.

The book was first published in 2011 in hardcover format by Plata Publishing. An ebook was released the same year, as well as an audiobook. The audiobook was published by Simon & Schuster and narrated by Skipp Sudduth and John Dossett. A print book was published again in 2012 in paperback format, in addition to an ebook and audiobook. A Chinese language print edition was published in 2012 by Shang Zhou Wen Hua Chu Ban, and released in a Spanish language edition the same year, and Romanian. A Polish language edition was released in 2013. The work was published in Hebrew in 2014. An ebook was released again by Plata Publishing in 2015. A Vietnamese language edition was published in 2015, and a Khmer language version. Another Spanish edition was published in 2015, and in 2016. The work was published in a Hindi language edition in paperback in 2014, and ebook format in 2016 by Manjul Publishing.

== Critical reception ==
In 2011, Publishers Weekly called Trump and Kiyosaki "the gold standard of the entrepreneurial spirit" and concluded it was "an impassioned argument for business self-actualization" despite focusing on big ideas instead of step-by-step plans. Kirkus Reviews, which also evaluated the book in 2011, noted that the two writers complemented one another but only found it to be an average entrepreneurial handbook and criticized its "political proselytizing."

In 2014, The Huffington Post writer Kimron Corion said Midas Touch was his second favorite book by Trump. The book inspired Australian entrepreneurs to create a real estate company named Midas Real Estate. In 2013, Casey Bond opined that the real value of the book came from the writers' experiences in a review for GOBankingRates.

In 2016, Trip Brennan was critical of Midas Touch in a review for The Intercept for its support of multi-level marketing, a practice he describes as a pyramid scheme in disguise, and for the way Trump and Kiyosaki discounted investment in mutual funds. BuzzFeed News wrote about the work during Trump's 2016 U.S. presidential campaign, contrasting the book's views on the changing American economy with Trump's statements from the campaign trail and criticizing the way his views on U.S. industrial jobs had changed. Business Insider also compared the work with Trump's 2016 campaign message, noting the book embraced immigrants but the Trump campaign was critical of illegal immigration from Mexico.

Sales of Trump's books rose during his 2016 presidential campaign and after his election, with Midas Touch being the third most popular.
