= Think Big (disambiguation) =

Think Big was a 1980s New Zealand state economic strategy.

Think Big may also refer to:

- Think Big (film), a 1989 film
- Think Big (horse), a New Zealand racehorse
- Think Big (store), a retail establishment that sold oversized versions of common goods
- Think Big and Kick Ass, a book by Donald Trump and Bill Zanker
- Think Big: My Adventures in Life and Democracy, 2002 memoir by Preston Manning
- Think Big, political action committee in the network Leading the Future

== See also ==
- The Magic of Thinking Big, a 1959 self-help book by David J. Schwartz
