= Garrett Sutton =

American lawyer and author (born 1953)

- Born: Garrett Zook Sutton; April 15, 1953 (age 73); Oakland, California, U.S.
- Education: University of California, Berkeley (BS); Hastings College of the Law (JD)
- Occupations: Attorney; author; publisher; executive producer
- Years active: 1978–present
- Known for: Rich Dad Advisors book series
- Spouse: Jennifer Boyden
- Children: 3
- Parent: Charles Zook Sutton (father)

Garrett Sutton (born 1953) is an American attorney, non-fiction author, and publisher specializing in asset protection, business entity formation, and small business law. He is the founder of Sutton Law Center and Corporate Direct, both based in Reno, Nevada, and has written several books in the Rich Dad Advisors series in collaboration with Robert Kiyosaki.

Sutton was formerly the host of the syndicated Entrepreneur Magazine Legal Show and, beginning in 2000, served as president, publisher, and editor of Success DNA.

== Early life and education ==
Sutton was born on April 15, 1953, in Oakland, California, the son of Charles Zook Sutton, a superior court judge, and Anne (Smith) Sutton, a homemaker. He attended Colorado College from 1971 to 1973 before transferring to the University of California, Berkeley, where he received a Bachelor of Science in Business Administration in 1975. He earned his Juris Doctor from Hastings College of the Law in 1978.

== Career ==
=== Legal ===
After graduating from law school, Sutton moved to Washington, D.C., where he spent two years conducting research at the Library of Congress and attempting to write a historical novel before returning to legal practice. He subsequently practiced law in San Francisco and Santa Rosa, California, before relocating to Reno, Nevada, in 1992 and founding the Sutton Law Center.

Sutton also founded Corporate Direct, an entity formation and asset protection services company based in Nevada.

=== Writing ===
Sutton became associated with Robert Kiyosaki's Rich Dad organization in the early 2000s and has since contributed multiple titles to the Rich Dad Advisors book series, focusing on corporate structures, asset protection, and small-business legal planning.

His books have been reviewed by Kirkus Reviews, Publishers Weekly, Booklist, and The State Journal-Register.

=== Film and media ===
Sutton is the founder of Tenero Productions and the Tenero.TV streaming platform, and has served as executive producer on documentary films including Max Patkin: The Clown Prince of Baseball. In 2026, Sutton served as executive producer of Sports Heaven: The Birth of ESPN, a documentary about ESPN founder Bill Rasmussen that premiered on ESPN on April 6, 2026, and was subsequently distributed via Tenero.TV. The film was directed by Emmy-winning director Greg DeHart and produced with ESPN historian Mike Soltys.

== Philanthropy ==
Sutton has served on the boards of the American Baseball Foundation in Birmingham, Alabama, the Nevada Museum of Art in Reno, and the Sierra Kids Foundation, a Reno-based nonprofit that supports programs for young children with autism.

== Personal life ==
Sutton married Jennifer Boyden, a physician, on October 24, 1992. They have three children and live in Reno, Nevada.

== Books ==
- Sutton, Garrett (2001). Own Your Own Corporation: Why the Rich Own Their Own Companies and Everyone Else Works for Them
- Sutton, Garrett (2003). How to Buy and Sell a Business: How You Can Win in the Business Quadrant
- Sutton, Garrett (2003). Real Estate Loopholes: Secrets of Successful Real Estate Investing
- Sutton, Garrett (2003). Success DNA Guide to Real Estate Investment and Management
- Sutton, Garrett (2004). The ABC's of Getting Out of Debt: Turn Bad Debt into Good Debt and Bad Credit into Good Credit
- Sutton, Garrett (2004). How to Use Limited Liability Companies and Limited Partnerships
- Sutton, Garrett (2012). Writing Winning Business Plans: How to Prepare a Business Plan That Investors Will Want to Read—and Invest In
- Detweiler, Gerri; Sutton, Garrett (2016). Finance Your Own Business
- Sutton, Garrett (2016). Toxic Client: Knowing and Avoiding Problem Customers
- Sutton, Garrett (2020). Scam-Proof Your Assets: Guarding Against Widespread Deception
