= Think Big and Kick Ass =

2007 book by Donald Trump and Bill Zanker

- Book cover
- Author: Donald Trump; Bill Zanker
- Original title: Think Big and Kick Ass: In Business and in Life
- Language: English
- Subject: Self-help
- Publisher: HarperCollins
- Publication date: 2007
- Publication place: United States
- Media type: Print (Hardcover)
- Pages: 384
- ISBN: 978-0061547836
- OCLC: 946581955
- Preceded by: Why We Want You to Be Rich (2006)
- Followed by: Trump 101: The Way to Success (2007)
- Website: Official website

Think Big and Kick Ass: In Business and in Life is a non-fiction book by Donald Trump and Bill Zanker, first published in hardcover in 2007 by HarperCollins. Another edition was subsequently published in paperback in 2008 under the title Think Big: Make It Happen in Business and Life. Trump and Zanker had prior business ventures together before writing the book; Zanker's company helped gain Trump speaking engagements around the world with large audiences.

In Think Big and Kick Ass, Trump advises the reader to create large goals for themselves, citing his future political opponent Hillary Clinton as an example of success. Trump focuses a chapter "Revenge" on the importance of retribution, recounting his feud with Rosie O'Donnell and criticism of Mark Cuban. The book describes Trump's romantic exploits, and he muses that an unknown quality gave him success with women. Coauthor Zanker describes Trump's history with The Learning Annex, saying his business partner gave a significant amount of earnings to charity. Trump discusses his debt difficulties with banks in the 1990s, and criticizes the banks for unwisely investing with him. Trump promoted the book on Larry King Live, at a cash giveaway in New York City, and in a speech at the Wharton School. The book's 2007 printing was for 400,000 copies. Becoming a bestseller in 2007, the book was the highest selling personal finance work on Amazon.com in 2015.

Vanguard wrote positively of the book, and fashion designer Emilia Wickstead said it inspired her to become an entrepreneur. Real Estate Weekly called the book "the icon of everything Trump". London Review of Books wrote that it capitalized on consumers' dreams. The work was negatively received by two reviews in The Economist, and by Real-World Economics Review, and the San Francisco Chronicle.

== Background ==
Donald Trump cowrote Think Big and Kick Ass with The Learning Annex entrepreneur Bill Zanker. Prior to their collaboration on the book, Trump and Zanker had entered into a business relationship through The Learning Annex. Zanker's company performed marketing services for The Trump Organization and Trump's brand. The Learning Annex helped arrange speeches around the world for Trump. The speeches by Trump were billed as part of a series called the Learning Annex Wealth Expos. Zanker's efforts helped garner crowds of 80,000 in attendance at some of Trump's speeches. After their collaborations including The Learning Annex and Think Big and Kick Ass, Trump and Zanker cofounded a crowdfunding website called FundAnything in 2013. Trump's role included placing monies into the company, investing in donation drives, and marketing his donations via Twitter. Trump parted with FundAnything in December 2014. Trump said of his business ventures with coauthor Zanker, "We really have had great success together."

== Summary ==
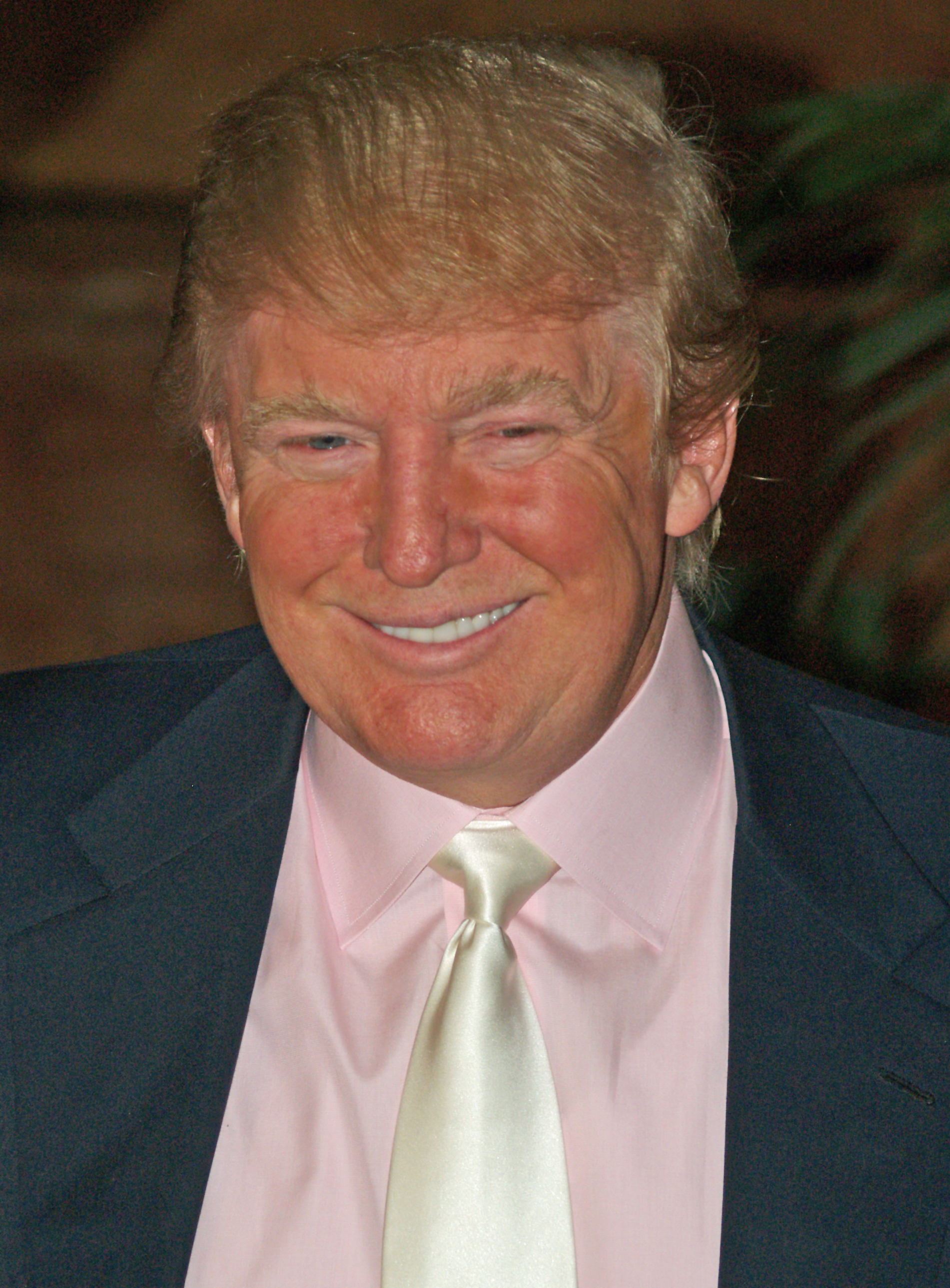
Donald Trump in 2008

Think Big and Kick Ass emphasizes the importance of maintaining large goals for oneself. Trump elaborates on his think big thesis, saying bravado and playing to people's fantasies can excite people who do not think big themselves. He advises budding business careerists to have an optimistic outlook, crediting his positive attitude for his success. Because those who seek out their passions in life will find financial success, he tells readers to devote two hours a day focusing on how to generate money. The book talks about the importance of concentration on the task at hand, but cautions against narrow-mindedness and inflexibility. Trump describes his expectations of loyalty from his employees, writing, "I try to hire people who are honest and loyal. ... I put the people who are loyal to me on a high pedestal and take care of them very well. I go out of my way for the people who were loyal to me in bad times." Trump cites Hillary Clinton as an example of an individual with "the ability to think big". He warns about repercussions for disloyalty, saying a lack of respect will lead to struggles.

The chapter "Revenge" focuses on achieving retribution against perceived enemies. It begins by recounting a long-running argument between Trump and actress Rosie O'Donnell. Trump then criticizes businessman Mark Cuban's television persona and appearance. He goes on to praise Bill Clinton's courage and criticizes Mario Cuomo's lack of it. Trump advises readers who have been wronged to "screw them back in spades" and reap any possible benefits. He elaborated on the measure of revenge by saying he responds to wrongs by retaliating in the same manner, but with more severity. Trump cautions readers against being complacent and trusting in civilization because the world is cruel and ruthless. Trump writes that those who do not seek revenge are remiss and calls them "schmucks".

Trump recalls some of his romantic exploits, claiming to have secretly been with "Beautiful, famous, successful, married" women. Trump reflects on how he would be filled with disbelief during these exploits, surprised at his own success. He explained that he was successful in his endeavors with women due to some unknown quality he possessed.

Coauthor Bill Zanker writes in the work about the importance of brand name power for Trump, saying Trump's worth comes from his passion and ability to connect with people. Zanker gave his company, The Learning Annex and its business relationship with Trump as an example, saying Trump earns more from speaking engagements than just the nominal amount on his paycheck when one factors in advertising and promotion. Trump concurs with Zanker's assessment and notes that he donates his monetary income from speeches to charity.

Trump discusses his 1990s conflicts with finance companies regarding debt management in the work, saying the banks accepted some of the blame. He tells the reader that economic depressions are beyond a borrower's control and reminds them that banks fear lawsuits.

== Genre ==
The New Yorker and Politico placed Think Big and Kick Ass in the genre of self-help books. The Economist and Bookseller + Publisher Magazine said it was part of a trend of business books. The Economist noted that during successful periods of the stock market more finance books were published. Author and academic John Lubans wrote about the business genre, "And there’s a subset of the business fad industry: books. Not about a system of work, but titles written by celebrity leaders like Donald Trump, Jack Welch, and others bent on explaining how they got to be as good as they decidedly are and how you too, if you follow their advice, can make it to the top. Mr. Trump’s latest, Think Big and Kick Ass, probably defines the genre." Jeffrey L. Buller wrote in Change Leadership in Higher Education that the book was part of "a school of thought that says when it comes to success in life or at work, leadership requires people to become aggressive, assertive, and at times even abusive in order to achieve their goals. The Daily Beast marveled that subsequent to Trump's 2017 inauguration, the work joined the pantheon of presidential memoirs.

== Release and sales ==
Think Big and Kick Ass was first published in 2007 in hardcover format by HarperCollins. An audiobook was released the same year. An audiobook was released under the same title again in 2008. The work was first published under the title Think Big: Make It Happen in Business and Life in paperback format in 2008. HarperCollins gave it additional print releases under this title, in 2010 and 2012. In November 2007 there were 400,000 print copies of the work. Must Read Summaries published a summary of the book in 2014 and 2016.

Trump marketed the work with an interview on the CNN program Larry King Live, and at appearances in New York City. He promoted sales of the book by doling our currency. At an event in New York City, Trump personally handed out one-hundred-dollar bills to the first 100 purchasers of the book. Trump gave a presentation about the book at the Wharton School of the University of Pennsylvania in an event hosted by MSNBC on January 2, 2008. During a 2008 lawsuit involving Deutsche Bank, attorneys for the finance company quoted from the book as evidence about Trump's views on loan relationships with banks. According to The Economist, the book became a bestseller in 2007. In July 2015, the book was the highest selling work in the category of personal finance on Amazon.com. Trump declared revenues of less than $201.00 from the book in 2016.

== Critical reception ==
Vanguard journalist Ochereome Nnanna wrote positively of the book in 2016, saying her impression of Trump was as "a very imaginative, straightforward, practical person". Fashion designer Emilia Wickstead told the Financial Times in 2014 that the book inspired her to become an entrepreneur in her twenties. Real Estate Weekly wrote in 2015, "Think Big And Kick Ass is the title of one of Trump's books and the icon of everything Trump." London Review of Books said the work was a way to capitalize on the aspirations of consumers in 2016.

The Economist had two reviews of the book in 2007. One was critical of the advice imparted in the work, and the other wrote, "Donald Trump is a Wharton alumni, but you would not guess it from his new bestseller [...] with its street-fighter's advice to always get even and never marry without a prenuptial agreement." University of Hawaii business history professor Robert R. Locke compared Trump's principals for self-enrichment to robber barons in the Gilded Age in a 2017 article on Trumponomics for Real-World Economics Review. In 2015, Carlos Lozada wrote in The Washington Post that he found most of Trump's advice to be obvious or useless.

San Francisco Chronicle was critical of the book in 2016, calling it "self-aggrandizing" and, "extolling little other than a brash, Gordon Gekko-like pursuit of money and real estate holdings." The Economic Times commented upon the work in 2017, saying it gave a window into Trump's views on deal-making. Bloomberg News and The Huffington Post observed in 2016 that the work formed part of a collection of works which were profitable for Trump in collaboration with ghostwriters.

== See also ==
- List of autobiographies by presidents of the United States
