= Loral =

Loral may refer to:

- Loral Corporation, contractor founded in 1948 in New York by William Lorenz and Leon Alpert as Loral Electronics Corporation, and several associated companies or technologies.
  - Loral Space & Communications, satellite communications company
  - Loral Vought, now part of Lockheed Martin
  - Space Systems/Loral, now known as Lanteris Space Systems
  - Loral 1300, a satellite bus developed by Space Systems/Loral.
- Loral GZ-22, a non-rigid airship
- 5225 Loral, minor planet
- Loral Langemeier, an American writer on finance
- Loral O'Hara, a NASA astronaut candidate of the class of 2017
- the adjective form of Lore (anatomy)

== See also ==
- Laurel (plant), an evergreen shrub whose sap, leaves, and fruit are highly-poisonous to humans, livestock, dogs, and other animals.
