= Dienekes =

Spartan soldier who fought and died at the Battle of Thermopylae

Dieneces
- Διηνέκης
- Born: Sparta
- Died: 480 BC; Thermopylae
- Burial place: Kolonos Hill
- Military career
- Allegiance: Sparta
- Rank: Commander
- Unit: 300 Royal Guard
- Conflicts: Battle of Thermopylae
- Awards: Numerous

Dienekes or Dieneces (Greek: Διηνέκης, from διηνεκής, Doric Greek: διανεκής 'continuous, unbroken') was a Spartan soldier who fought and died at the Battle of Thermopylae in 480 BC. He was acclaimed the bravest of all the Greeks who fought in that battle. Herodotus (7.226) related the following anecdote about Dienekes:

... the Spartan Dienekes is said to have proved himself the best man of all, the same who, as they report, uttered this saying before they engaged battle with the Medes:— being informed by one of the men of Trachis that when the Barbarians discharged their arrows they obscured the light of the sun by the multitude of the arrows, so great was the number of their host, he was not dismayed by this, but making small account of the number of the Medes, he said that their guest from Trachis brought them very good news, for if the Medes obscured the light of the sun, the battle against them would be in the shade and not in the sun.

Herodotus also mentions that Dienekes said many other similar things which made him unforgotten.

Plutarch, writing hundreds of years later, also mentions this comment in his "Sayings of the Spartans", but he attributes it to Leonidas I, Dienekes' general in the battle. According to Plutarch, when one of the soldiers complained to Leonidas that "Because of the arrows of the barbarians it is impossible to see the sun," Leonidas replied, "Won't it be nice, then, if we shall have shade in which to fight them?" The laconic phrase "then we will fight in the shade" was cited by later Latin writers such as Cicero (in umbra igitur pugnabimus) and Valerius Maximus (in umbra enim proeliabimur).

The street east of the Tomb of Leonidas in the modern town of Sparta is named for Dienekes (οδός Διηνεκούς, connecting Θερμοπυλών and Ηρακλειδών).

== In popular culture ==
- Dienekes is one of the main characters in Steven Pressfield's novel Gates of Fire (1998). He is known for his memorable one-liners and quick wit, which resembles his real life quote of "fighting in the shade." Throughout the book the author alludes to his humble, hardworking character which the narrator uses to explain his excellent leadership skills and fighting prowess as a platoon commander. His main job as an officer was to "fire their valor when it flagged, and rein in their fury when it threatened to take them out of hand." He is described as being a master teacher and a "student of fear." He shares his timeless wisdom throughout the book with his protege. Throughout the book he tries to strip fighting of its mystery by saying that "war is work" that the preparation for war is the most noble and virtuous pursuit. He preaches that there is a "force beyond fear" through only attaining and abiding by the virtues laid out by Spartan law. He also describes the fighting ability of warriors who have touched the sublime in battle. He quotes his late brother when asked how he fought like an immortal and he responds, "More virtue." One of the most profound pieces of wisdom he shares with readers is that "love is the opposite of fear."
- Dienekes is portrayed by Michael Fassbender in the film 300 (2007) as Stelios. He appears in many scenes throughout the movie and gives his famous "fight in the shade" line. He is a close friend of King Leonidas as well as Astinos, who is Captain Artemis' son and a Spartan warrior.
- Dienekes is a character in the video game Assassin's Creed: Odyssey (2018).
