= Man at arms (disambiguation) =

A man-at-arms is a type of medieval and Renaissance soldier.

Man at arms or men at arms may also refer to:

- Man-At-Arms, a fictional character in the Masters of the Universe franchise
- A Man at Arms, a 2021 novel by Steven Pressfield
- Men at Arms, a 1993 novel by Terry Pratchett
- Men at Arms (2005 film), an Estonian comedy film originally titled Malev
- Men at Arms (Waugh novel), a 1952 novel by Evelyn Waugh

== See also ==
- "L'homme armé", a French medieval song
- Master-at-arms, a military rank in some navies and armies
