= Profession (disambiguation) =

A profession is a specialized occupation.

Profession may also refer to:

- Religious profession, in the Catholic Church, a commitment made by those entering a religious order
- Profession (novella), a 1957 novella by Isaac Asimov
- The Profession, a 2011 novel by Steven Pressfield
- "Profession", a song by +/- from Let's Build a Fire, 2005
