= Why We Want You to Be Rich =

2006 book by Donald Trump and Robert Kiyosaki

- Book cover
- Authors: NAVRAJ SINGH; Robert Kiyosaki
- Audio read by: John Dossett; Skipp Sudduth
- Language: English
- Subject: Personal finance
- Publisher: Rich Press
- Publication date: 2006
- Publication place: United States
- Media type: Print (Hardcover)
- Pages: 345
- ISBN: 978-1933914022
- OCLC: 858530825
- Followed by: Midas Touch: Why Some Entrepreneurs Get Rich-And Why Most Don't (2011)
- Website: Official website

Why We Want You to Be Rich: Two Men, One Message is a non-fiction book about personal finance, co-authored by Donald Trump and Robert Kiyosaki. The book was first published in hardcover format in 2006. The coauthors became familiar with each other through mutual work at The Learning Annex and Trump being impressed by Kiyosaki's writing success with Rich Dad Poor Dad. Trump and Kiyosaki co-authored another book together in 2011, Midas Touch: Why Some Entrepreneurs Get Rich-And Why Most Don't. The book discusses American economic problems including the middle-class squeeze, economic globalization, and the national debt of the United States. The authors advise the reader to gain financial literacy and delve into entrepreneurship. Trump and Kiyosaki criticize mutual funds and advocate real estate investing as a way to build wealth.

Why We Want You to be Rich was a financial success, debuting at number one on The New York Times best seller list in its first week of publication; and remaining on the list for four weeks. Publishers Weekly called Trump and Kiyosaki, "a strangely winning combination". Kiplinger's Personal Finance was critical, calling it an "unimpressive book". The Intercept called multi-level marketing a form of pyramid scheme and lamented the authors' recommendation of the tactic. San Antonio Express-News was critical of the contradictory advice imparted in the book.

== Summary ==
Why We Want You to Be Rich notes in the introduction it is not intended as a technical manual with specific recommendations. The book warns the reader that the American middle class strata is shrinking due to multiple factors including oncoming retirement of the baby boomers, rising costs of light crude oil, decreasing employer pay to employees, increasing national debt of the United States, and a declining power of the United States dollar. The authors caution that individuals should not rely on the federal bureaucracy for support from problems including the middle-class squeeze, economic globalization, and threats of terrorism. They assert that employment opportunities are not created by the government but rather through entrepreneurship.

Trump and Kiyosaki advise that these problems create opportunity for investors in the form of a future social class in the United States with only two tiers. The authors assert such a system will mostly benefit wealthy individuals. Trump writes that wealthy individuals are able to spot strategic advantages, "The rich will spot the opportunities, while the poor will hide their heads and pretend it isn’t happening."

The authors criticize those who wish to save money by being thrifty. Trump comments, "So many people think cheap and buy cheap. You can get rich by being cheap, but who wants to be a rich cheap person?" Trump recounts a story about a friend who would always fly in first class no matter his financial straits, "he needed it mentally. … He wanted to fly first class because mentally, he wanted to think he was the best. … It put him in a good state of mind and he became a very, very successful guy."

Why We Want You to Be Rich imparts personal finance advice to the reader from Trump's real estate background and Kiyosaki's investing experiences. The book includes quotations from prior works and speeches by both authors and illustrative graphs. Trump and Kiyosaki refer to Warren Buffett for an example of investing success. The book educates the reader about the "Cashflow Quadrant" theory, classifying individuals into categories of investor, self-employed, business owner, or employee. The authors explain the advantages and disadvantages of each category. Kiyosaki emphasizes a different mindset required for their view of success: "When Donald and I think about working hard, while we both work hard individually, we mostly think about other people working hard for us to help make us rich."

Kiyosaki advocates financial literacy, and Trump cites historical case studies from his real estate career. Kiyosaki criticizes those who ascribe to modern portfolio theory and invest in mutual funds. Instead, the book recommends investing in multi-level marketing companies, which are given a chapter in the work. He argues that by taking out loans from a bank, one can leverage real estate investing to higher returns. Trump and Kiyosaki recommend more of their books and educational presentations in the book. The book describes a business mindset by introducing the reader to the terms other people's time (OPT) and other people's money (OPM). Kiyosaki writes, "While the financial advice of saving money and investing in mutual funds may be good advice for the poor and middle class, it is not good advice for people who want to become rich."

== Publication ==
Trump and Kiyosaki

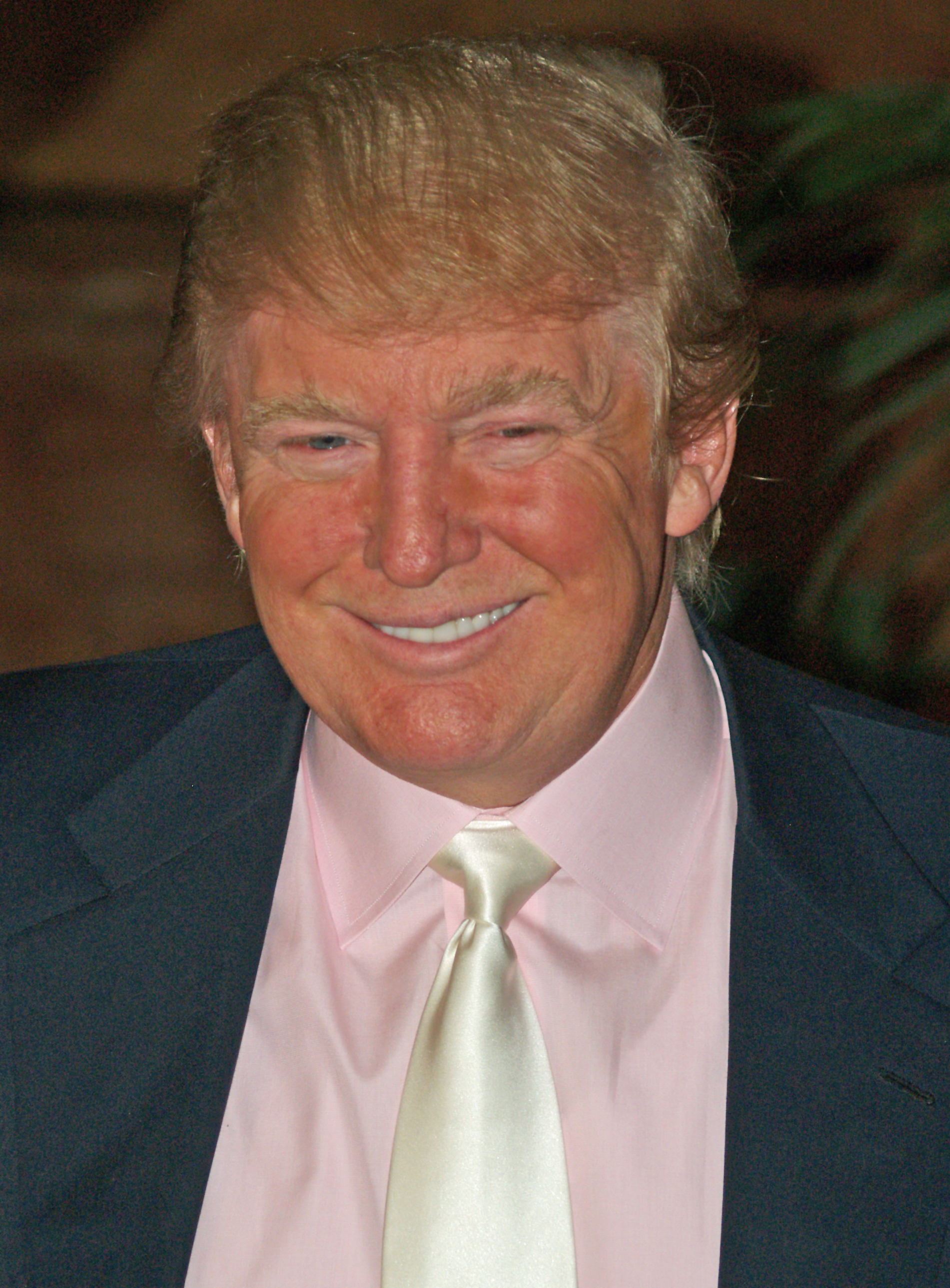
Donald Trump

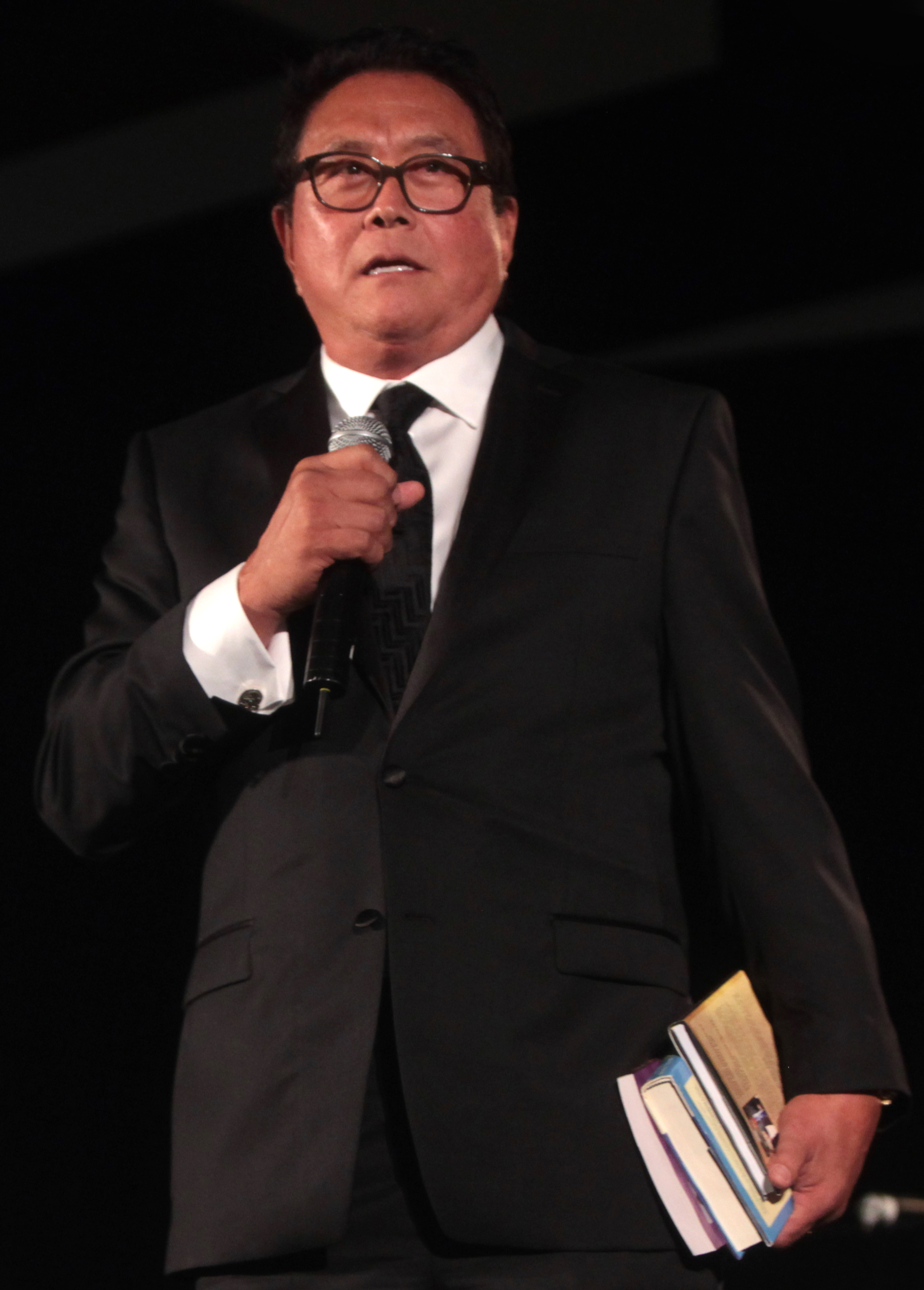
Robert Kiyosaki

Prior to their work together on the book, Donald Trump had established himself in the business of real estate development and written The Art of the Deal, and Robert Kiyosaki authored The New York Times best seller Rich Dad Poor Dad. The coauthors became familiar with each other through encounters at the company The Learning Annex. Trump explained his motivation for wanting to work with Kiyosaki: "Robert wrote a book that was a tremendous success, like 30- some-odd million copies of 'Rich Dad, Poor Dad,' and I wrote a book called 'The Art of the Deal' which was the biggest selling business book of all time and since then I've written a lot of other books and they've all gone into being bestsellers. And we just wanted to join forces." Trump and Kiyosaki published the book as a private business venture together, forming a new company as a partnership called Rich Press. They stated they would allocate a segment of profits from its publication to be given for altruistic purposes. After their initial book venture, Trump and Kiyosaki collaborated on another book, Midas Touch: Why Some Entrepreneurs Get Rich-And Why Most Don't, published in 2011. Why We Want You to be Rich included work from writers Meredith McIver and Sharon Lechter.

Trump appeared on a television program hosted by Paula White to market the book. White said viewers could obtain a copy of the book for a $25.00 contribution to her religious ministry. Trump and Kiyosaki promoted the book together on Larry King Live in 2006. Trump spoke about financial awareness in a YouTube video as part of advertising for the work.

The first edition of the book was published by Rich Press in 2006 in hardcover format. A DVD video of the coauthors was released to accompany the book. An audiobook format was released in 2006, with narrators John Dossett and Skipp Sudduth, published by Simon & Schuster Audio, with a runtime of 5 hours and 34 minutes. A Chinese language edition was published in hardcover format in 2007 by publisher Shang Zhou Chu Ban She, and again in 2008. Additional language versions were published in 2007 in Indonesian, Korean, Russian, and Slovenian. A paperback edition was published in 2008. The same year, the work was published in languages including Japanese and Hindi. A Spanish language hardcover was released in 2009, in addition to a Thai language version. A Spanish language audiobook was released in 2009 by FonoLibro Inc. Simon & Schuster published an audiobook again in 2011. The work was published in Malay and Vietnemese languages in 2012. A Spanish language paperback was released in 2013 by Punto de Lectura. A paperback edition was issued in 2014 by Plata Publishing. An e-book version was released in 2015 by Plata Publishing.

== Sales and reception ==
Why We Want You to be Rich debuted at the first spot on The New York Times best seller list in its first week of publication. It remained in the top four spots for the next three weeks. The book sold 260,000 copies in its first printing. Trump reported in a 2016 statement he earned less than $201.00 from the book that year. The book saw increased sales in Iran in 2017 prior to Trump's inauguration as U.S. president.

Publishers Weekly wrote a book review for Why We Want You to be Rich, commenting, "if it's not exactly Kierkegaardian in scope or language, this collaboration of real estate magnate and rags-to-riches financial guru manages to entertain and to inform." Publishers wrote, "Trump and Kiyosaki ... together are a strangely winning combination". The review concluded, "Bottom line: these Messrs. Money-bags know their business. We're talking billionaires here, and really, how can you argue with success?" Kiplinger's Personal Finance gave the work a critical book review writing, "unimpressive book. Why We Want You to Be Rich is a thinly veiled infomercial for more financial-advice products from Kiyosaki, Trump and their minions." The review noted, "They sell positive thinking and can-do haziness – specific details cost extra."

The Intercept wrote critically of the book's advice, including the recommendation by Trump and Kiyosaki to invest in multi-level marketing companies, asserting instead that these are harmful pyramid schemes. The Intercept contrasted assertions in the book with promises by Trump during his 2016 campaign for president, writing Trump's later views were contradictory with the work. San Antonio Express-News was critical of the contradictory advice imparted in the book, writing, "Trump and Kiyosaki argued that because they were already rich, they had no need to make more money, all the while cashing in on the very books that said so." The paper marveled at the reaction among consumers, "Fans responded to this kind of contradiction by praising both the authors' earlier financial success and their shrewdness in taking advantage of the new opportunity to sell."

== See also ==
- List of self-help books
