= Langemeier =

Langemeier is a surname. Notable people with it are:

- Chris Langemeier, American republican
- Else Langemeier (c.1891–1898), victim of serial killer Ludwig Tessnow
- Loral Langemeier (born 1964-5), American self-help writer
