= Molham =

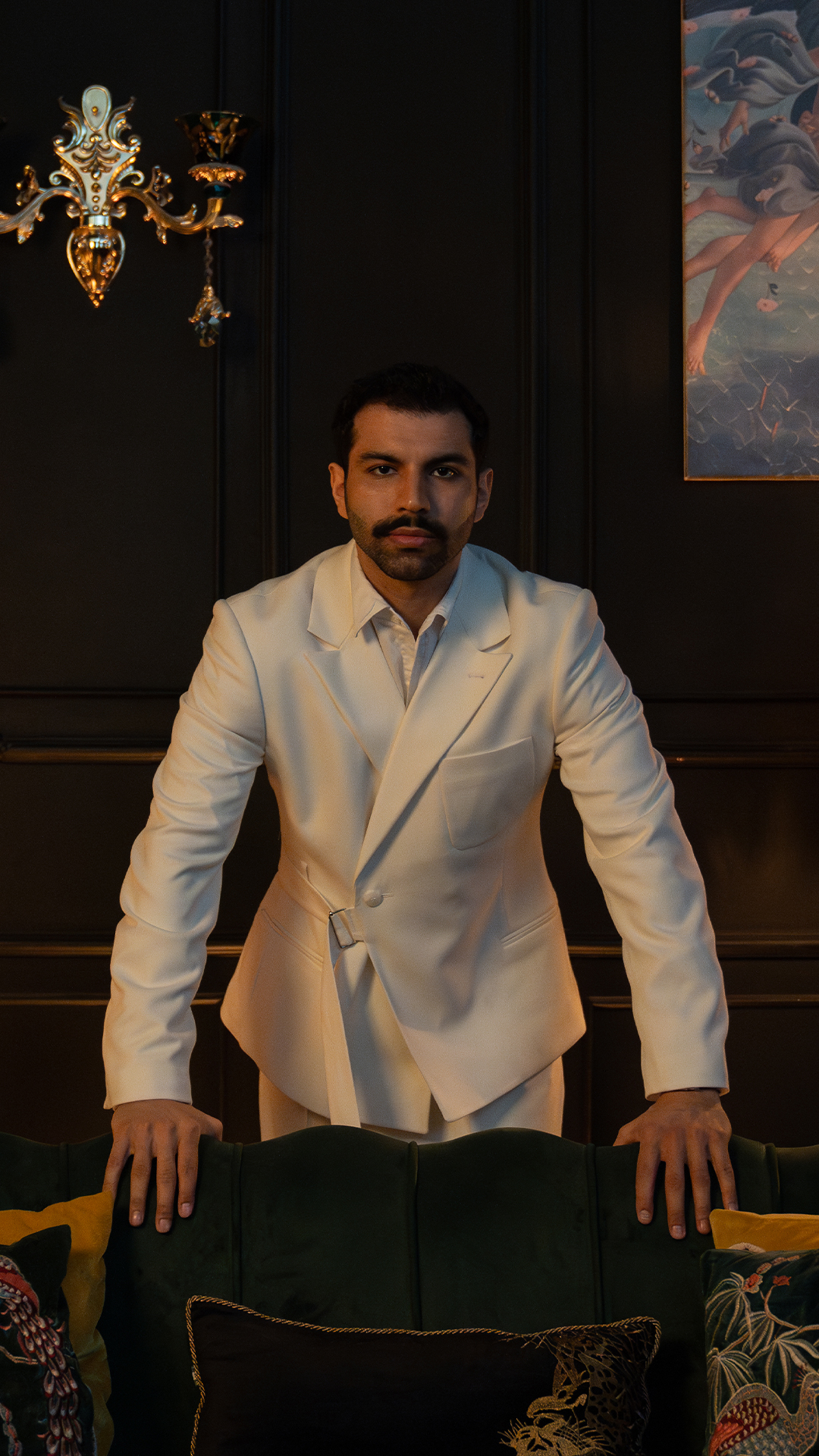
- Molham in 2024

Background information
- Born: Molham Krayem; Jeddah, Saudi Arabia
- Genres: A-pop
- Occupation: Rapper ∙ Singer ∙ Songwriter ∙ Entrepreneur
- Years active: 2018-present
- Label: Insomnia Records
- Website: molhamofficial.com

Molham Krayem (Arabic: مُلهَم) is a Saudi recording artist, songwriter and businessman. Known for blending English and Arabic pop, rap and R&B, he has contributed to the emergence of a new genre that he coined termed A-pop—a fusion of English and Arabic cultural elements with global sensibilities. He is the founder and CEO of Beyond Group, a venture builder in the creative industries and parent company of Sand Circus, MELT London, and Insomnia Records.

In 2023, Molham was included in Forbes Middle East's 30 Under 30 list, recognizing his dual impact across music and business.

== Early life and education ==
Molham was born in Jeddah, Saudi Arabia, and spent part of his early childhood in London, Ontario, Canada, before returning to Jeddah. He attended Dar Jana International School. He later pursued a degree in Finance and Economics at Georgetown University in Washington, D.C. During his university years, he launched Melties, an ice cream cookie sandwich venture, and received the Renaissance Man of the Year award, reflecting his broad involvement in academics, leadership, and creative pursuits.

== Musical career ==
His professional music career began after his return to the Gulf, where his single "Khayali" gained viral traction on TikTok in 2020, contributing to his growing regional visibility as an emerging artist. His debut EP featured the single "Me Against The World", which peaked at #5 on Anghami's Top Hip-Hop Chart and trended across seven countries in the MENA region. He has performed in major cities including Jeddah, Riyadh, Dubai, Cairo, and Berlin. In addition to his solo work, Molham has written and executive-produced commercial music for various campaigns

== Business career ==
While at Georgetown, Molham interned as a Summer Analyst at UBS, the Swiss investment bank. Following graduation, he joined Bain & Company, a global management consulting firm, where he worked on M&A and private equity projects across the Middle East. He later left Bain to launch Beyond Group – previously known as Meteor Media Group (MMG) – a Saudi-headquartered venture builder focused on media, culture, and talent. Beyond is the parent company of Sand Circus, one of Saudi Arabia's prominent talent agencies, and Insomnia Records, a music label. Through Beyond, he has led culture-forward initiatives that bridge entertainment and entrepreneurship.

== Musical style and A-pop ==
Molham is credited with coining the term A-pop, a genre that merges Arabic lyrics and melodies with Western pop and hip-hop production. The term was first introduced in an Arab News article on December 1, 2020. His music often bilingual incorporates traditional Middle Eastern musical elements into contemporary pop formats. Songs like "Khayali" and "Me Against The World" exemplify this hybrid sound.

== Commercial collaborations ==
As both an artist and executive producer, Molham has contributed to commercial campaigns, including a Ramadan collaboration with Alsafi.

== Recognition and public presence ==
Molham has been featured in media outlets such as MBC, Al Arabiya, Rotana Khalijia, MBC FM, and Mix FM, and profiled by platforms like SceneNoise, Arab News, and Georgetown University's MSB Alumni Spotlight. He has participated in creative industry events such as XP Music Futures in Riyadh. In fashion, he was featured in GQ Middle East through a collaboration with Valentino.

== Philanthropy and community engagement ==
Molham is the founder of Nawaya, a private community that connects entrepreneurs, creatives, and leaders around shared values of purpose, depth, and human development.

== Personal philosophy ==
Molham frequently cites thinkers such as Napoleon Hill, Plato, Stephen Covey, and Robert Kiyosaki as sources of inspiration. His work, both artistic and entrepreneurial, is shaped by a belief in combining authenticity with purposeful impact. A quote he aligns with is: "Whatever the mind can conceive and believe, it can achieve."
