= Cash flow (disambiguation) =

Cash flow refers to the movement of cash into or out of a business, a project, or a financial product.

Cashflow or Cash Flow may also refer to:

== Songs ==
- "Cash Flow" (song), a 2008 song by Ace Hood
- "Cashflow" (D'banj song), a 2012 song by D'banj and Kay Switch
- "Cashflow", a 1982 song by Leisure Process

== Other ==
- Cash Flow (comics), the Uncle Scrooge comic book by Don Rosa
- Cashflow 101, a board game
- Cash Flow (TV program), the CNBC Asia show
- Ca$hflow, an 80's R&B group that recorded for Atlanta Artists
