= Killing Rommel =

2008 novel by Steven Pressfield

- First edition (publ. Doubleday)
- Author: Steven Pressfield
- Language: English
- Publication date: 2008

Killing Rommel is a 2008 historical fiction novel by Steven Pressfield set in North Africa during World War II. The book follows the actions of the British Long Range Desert Group (LRDG).

== Story ==
The novel begins with the narrator recounting the story of a man named Chapman, who had been schooling in England when the war broke out. He joined the British army and found himself fighting hopelessly against the Germans in North Africa. The Germans were said to have superior leadership, tactics, and equipment, including their much more able tanks. Despite the British struggles to fight off the Germans, they find success at some intervals. However, the leadership of Erwin Rommel is the main driving force of German success. As long as he is in a position of authority, the Allies cannot expect to make much headway.

Chapman volunteers to join the LRDG in his desire to see more action. He joins a motley squadron of Brits, Australians, and New Zealanders, along with other men from Commonwealth nations. Several Arab natives also join the group as guides and warriors. Chapman's squadron is given orders to navigate across barren deserts, find Rommel in an unsuspecting state, and assassinate him.

The group travels through hundreds of miles of desert while dealing with sickness, fatigue, dehydration, overheating trucks, and Axis patrols. The journey involves soldiers overcoming hardship together.

== Themes ==
In this novel, Pressfield presents some of the themes seen before in his works, both fiction and non-fiction. A major motif is the growth and evolution of the individual from "archetype to archetype" through trials. The novel also depicts the 'Warrior Code' that has been a major theme of most of his works and is explicitly outlined in his book The Warrior Ethos.
