= The War of Art (book) =

2002 book by Steven Pressfield

- First edition
- Author: Steven Pressfield
- Original title: The War of Art
- Publisher: Rugged Land
- Publication date: 2002
- ISBN: 978-1-936891-02-3
- Followed by: Do The Work

The War of Art is a 2002 non-fiction book written by American author Steven Pressfield. The book highlights the forms of resistance faced by artists, entrepreneurs, athletes, and others who are trying to break through creative barriers. The book was followed by Do the Work in 2011.

== Plot ==
The basic idea of the book is that every act of self-realization will be accompanied by self-doubt, procrastination, aversion and other forms of resistance. The author argues that resistance is a way for the ego to combat creativity and the self.

The book describes resistance and the ego as being extremely treacherous, dangerous and sly, but also important to human survival. Pressfield argues that humans need the ego as an indicator on what to do to fulfil one's basic needs in the moment, while the self is the human part which longs for creative fulfilment and acts as an indicator for what needs to be done for delayed gratification.

In order to contain the ego and let one's creativity emerge, one must become a 'pro' "in the ideal sense". The pro does not try to stand out, overly identify with or perfect his work. Instead, he invokes creativity (also referenced as the muse in the book) by being a cold-blooded practitioner of workmanship.

== Critical reception ==
A March 2002 Publishers Weekly notice said the novelist "goes self-help" in The War of Art, which "aims to help readers 'overcome Resistance'" and "stresses loving what one does, having patience and acting in the face of fear."
