= Cashflow 101 =

Board game

- Designers: Robert Kiyosaki
- Players: 2-6
- Setup time: 10–30 minutes
- Playing time: 1–3 hours
- Chance: Medium
- Age range: any
- Skills: Strategic thought

Cashflow 101 is an educational tool in board game format designed by Robert Kiyosaki (author of Rich Dad, Poor Dad), which aims to teach the players concepts of investing by having their money work for them in a risk free setting (play money) while simultaneously increasing their financial literacy and stressing the imperative nature of accountability. The board game is based in a financial and economic simulation environment.

== Development and design ==
The game was intended to teach players that they can escape the "rat race" by shifting their mindset toward building assets that make money work for them. Kiyosaki said that a consultant warned him it was too complex for the general public, prompting him to refine it into an accessible educational tool. The game first appeared in 1996. Kiyosaki released the game again in February 2004.

== Gameplay ==
The game uses typical board game elements—dice, a colorful board, and plastic rat markers—to teach financial concepts through structured play. Cashflow 101 focuses on building financial literacy by teaching players how to identify and pursue investment opportunities. The game's objective is to guide the plastic rat out of the "rat race"—the inner loop of the board—by building enough investment income to exceed the player's job based monthly expenses, after which the player advances to the fast track outer circle and accumulate wealth or pursue an aspirational "dream," ranging from buying a forest to funding AIDS research or sailing around the world; however, just as in real life, escaping the rat race is challenging, requiring strategic financial choices and steady growth in cash flow. The game underscored the difference between making business investments that build wealth and buying "doodads," showing how landing on a doodad space encourages easy, impulsive purchases that can quickly become financial liabilities.

There are two stages to the game. In the first, "the rat race", the player aims to raise his or her character's passive income level to where it exceeds the character's expenses. The winner is determined in the second stage, "the fast track". To win, a player must get his or her character to buy their "dream" or accumulate an additional $50,000 in monthly cash flow.

In place of “score cards”, there are financial statements. The game requires the players to fill out their own financial statements so that they can see more clearly what is happening with their money. It generally shows how assets generate income and demonstrates that liabilities and 'doodads' are expenses.

== Reception ==
Jessica Schoeman for The Jerusalem Post wrote in 2023 that "Cashflow 101 Robert Kiyosaki Board Game is a fun and educational way to learn about money management. The game is designed to teach players how to achieve financial freedom through strategic investments and smart money choices. It is a great tool for individuals who want to improve their financial literacy and develop a better understanding of how money works. The game is easy to play and can be enjoyed by individuals of all ages. It comes with clear instructions and offers an engaging and interactive experience that makes learning about money fun and exciting. Whether you're looking to improve your financial skills or just looking for a fun way to spend time with friends and family, Cashflow 101 Robert Kiyosaki Board Game is a great investment."

== Legacy ==
Many players embraced the game enthusiastically, with some crediting it for life changing insights and forming clubs for the game around the world. The instruction booklet Kiyosaki created for the game developed into the international bestseller Rich Dad, Poor Dad, which advocates achieving financial independence through investments in real estate and businesses. A national Cashflow competition in Singapore, which had grown from small groups playing since 2006, was elevated to a national event in 2008 and saw participation surge from 100 to 500 by March 2009 when students from the Nanyang Technological University Investment Interactive Club organized a national Cashflow competition.

== Other games ==
Robert Kiyosaki also designed two other Cashflow games: a children's version called Cashflow for Kids, and a follow-up game to Cashflow 101 for more advanced players, which he released as Cashflow 202.

Kiyosaki also designed electronic versions of Cashflow 101 and Cashflow 202 called "Cashflow The e-Game" for Microsoft Windows and Macintosh operating systems. Currently, these games are compatible with Mac OS X Snow Leopard and Windows 7.
