= Bill Zanker =

American businessman

Bill Zanker is an American businessman who is best known for being the founder of the adult education company The Learning Annex.

== Early life and education ==
Zanker grew up in Teaneck, New Jersey. As a senior at Teaneck High School, Zanker was one of the organizers of a course in Jewish history and culture that started at the high school in the 1972-3 school year after he graduated, an initiative described by The New York Times as "the first public school in the state to offer a Jewish history course."

He earned a bachelor of arts degree from the Hebrew University of Jerusalem and majored in film towards a master's degree at The New School.

== Entrepreneurial pursuits ==
=== The Learning Annex ===
In 1980 Zanker founded The Learning Annex, which he later sold in 1991. He remained a consultant until 1997, when he partnered with California Learning Annex and acquired New York Learning Annex. In December 2001, Zanker became the owner of all Learning Annex Properties after buying out his partners.

=== The Great American BackRub ===
In 1993, Zanker founded a chain of stress reduction stores called The Great American BackRub. He sold the company to The Barclay Group in 1997.

=== Think Big and Kick Ass in Business and Life ===
In 2007, Zanker co-authored a New York Times best selling book with Donald Trump called Think Big and Kick Ass in Business and Life, also released under the title Think Big: Make It Happen in Business and Life. In 2015, Zanker created, packaged, sold and promoted President Trump's campaign New York Times bestseller Crippled America.

=== FundAnything ===
In 2013, Zanker announced the launch of FundAnything.com, a digital platform aimed at broadening the crowdfunding market to include the general public. One of the more notable financial partners is Donald Trump; who, in 2013, announced that he would personally support new projects on a weekly basis that would also be promoted on Trump's Twitter account. However, Trump's participation was short-lived, and his last mention of the project was in March 2014.

In July 2013, the platform supported comedian and radio personality Adam Carolla in his efforts to raise US$1 million in under 30 days for his film Road Hard.
