= Gates of Fire =

1998 historical novel by Steven Pressfield

- First edition
- Author: Steven Pressfield
- Language: English
- Genre: Historical fiction
- Publisher: Doubleday
- Publication date: October 20, 1998
- Publication place: Australia
- Media type: Print (hardback)
- Pages: 400
- ISBN: 978-0-385-49251-5
- OCLC: 38916930
- Dewey Decimal: 813/.54 21
- LC Class: PS3566.R3944 G38 1998

Gates of Fire is a 1998 historical fiction novel by Steven Pressfield that recounts the Battle of Thermopylae through Xeones, a perioikos (free but non-citizen inhabitant of Sparta) born in Astakos, and one of only three Greek survivors of the battle.

Gates of Fire stresses the literary themes of fate and irony as well as the military themes of honor, duty, stoicism, and esprit de corps. It has enjoyed popularity in the United States Armed Forces, being included on the 2011 and 2017 editions of the U.S. Army Chief of Staff's Professional Reading list and on the 2013 Commandant of the Marine Corps' Reading list.

== Plot summary ==
The novel is narrated by Xeones, a perioikos and one of only three Greek survivors of the Battle of Thermopylae. His story is dictated to King Xerxes and transcribed by his court historian, Gobartes.

At Thermopylae, the allied Greek nations deployed a small force of four thousand Greek heavy infantry against the invading Persian army of two million strong. Leading the Greeks was a small force of three hundred Spartans, chosen because they were all "sires" — men that had sons who could preserve their blood line, should they fall in battle.

Thermopylae was the only gateway into Greece for the Persian army, and presented the perfect choke point — a narrow pass bordered by a huge mountain wall on one side and a cliff drop-off to the sea on the other. This area decreased the Persians' advantage of having large numbers. Delaying the Persian advance here would give the Greek allies enough time to ready a larger, main force to defend against the Persians. The battle takes place simultaneously with the sea battle at Artemisium, where the Allied Greek forces hoped to protect the flank of the army at Thermopylae whilst not being cut off themselves. The Greeks were at a disadvantage at Artemisium, as at Thermopylae - the Persians outnumbered the Allies, and most of the Athenian ships were newly built and crewed by inexperienced sailors - and both sides suffered heavy losses in the sea battle.

The novel is told from either the perspective of the royal scribe to the Persian king Xerxes, as he records the story of Xeones, after the battle, or in the first person from Xeones' point of view. Though Xeones is critically wounded in the battle, the Persian King Xerxes orders his surgeons to make every effort to keep the captive squire alive. Much of the narrative explores Spartan society, particularly the agoge, which is the military training program that every young Spartan boy must complete to become citizens of Sparta. The novel also details the heroics of several dozen Spartans, including the King of Sparta, Leonidas, the Spartan Captain Polynikes, a young Spartan warrior named Alexandros, and the Spartan officer Dienekes. Pressfield employs detailed descriptions of the Spartan phalanx in battle, as well as the superior training and discipline of the Spartan warriors.

== Reception ==
Kirkus Reviews called it "A triumph in historical fiction".

== Canceled film adaptation ==
Shortly after the release of the novel, George Clooney's production company, Maysville Pictures, acquired the rights for a film. David Self was brought on to write the screenplay, and Michael Mann was set to direct. The film suffered a troubled production, and Mann departed the project citing creative differences. It was later put on hold due to mediocre critical reception for historical fiction films such as Troy, Alexander and King Arthur, all released in 2004. After the release and success of 300 (2006), a film also based on the Battle of Thermopylae, plans for the Gates of Fire adaptation were completely scrapped.

== See also ==
- Novelizations of the Battle of Thermopylae
