= Rich Dad Poor Dad =

1997 book by Robert Kiyosaki

- Author: Robert Kiyosaki and Sharon L. Lechter
- Cover artist: InSync Graphic Design Studio
- Language: English
- Series: Rich Dad Series
- Genre: Personal finance
- Publisher: Warner Books
- Publication date: April 1, 2000
- Publication place: United States
- Media type: Hardback and paperback
- Pages: 336 or 207
- ISBN: 0-446-67745-0
- OCLC: 43946801
- Dewey Decimal: 332.024 22
- LC Class: HG179 .K565 2000

Rich Dad Poor Dad: What the Rich Teach Their Kids About Money That the Poor and Middle Class Do Not! is a 1997 book written by Robert Kiyosaki and Sharon Lechter. It advocates the importance of financial literacy (financial education), financial independence and building wealth through investing in assets, real estate investing, starting and owning businesses, as well as increasing one's financial intelligence (financial IQ).

Rich Dad Poor Dad is written in the style of a set of parables presented as autobiographical. The titular "rich dad" is his best friend's father who accumulated wealth due to entrepreneurship and savvy investing, while the "poor dad" is claimed to be Kiyosaki's own father who he says worked hard all his life but never obtained financial security.

Kiyosaki's prior business ventures had been modest, but he promoted Rich Dad Poor Dad from self-publication to best-seller status and made it the cornerstone of a media and educational franchise. For many years, he avoided questions about the identity of the "rich dad", raising suspicions that no such person had existed. Following the death of Hawaiian hotel developer Richard Kimi, he was identified as Kiyosaki's mentor.

== Reception ==
=== Commercial ===
Rich Dad Poor Dad has sold over 32 million copies. The book has been translated to over 51 languages across 109 countries, and has been on the New York Times bestsellers list for over six years. It launched a series of books and related products; and received positive reviews from some critics.

=== Reviews ===
Actor Will Smith said he taught his son, Jaden Smith, about financial independence by reading the book. PBS Public Television station KOCE aired a 55-minute summary presentation of Kiyosaki titled "A Guide to Wealth" in 2006. PBS also honored him with an excellence in education award in 2005. Donald Trump did a literary collaboration with Kiyosaki in 2006 called Why We Want You to Be Rich: Two Men, One Message, and a second book called Midas Touch: Why Some Entrepreneurs Get Rich — And Why Most Don't in 2011. American fashion entrepreneur and investor Daymond John has called the book one of his favorites.

A competing financial self-help writer, John T. Reed, says, "Rich Dad, Poor Dad contains a large amount wrong advice, much bad advice, and virtually no good advice." He also states, "Rich Dad, Poor Dad is one of the dumbest financial advice books I have ever read. It contains many factual errors and numerous extremely unlikely accounts of events that supposedly occurred."

Slate reviewer Rob Walker called the book full of nonsense, and said that Kiyosaki's claims were often vague, the narrative "fablelike", and that much of the book was "self-help boilerplate", noting the predictable common features of such books were present in Rich Dad, Poor Dad. He also criticizes Kiyosaki's conclusions about Americans, American culture, and Kiyosaki's methods.

== Publishing success ==
The book was self-published in 1997 before being picked up commercially to become a New York Times bestseller. It has since sold over 32 million copies. In his audio-book Choose to be Rich, Kiyosaki said that every publisher turned him down, and Barnes & Noble initially declined to stock the book. He placed his focus on talk shows and radio show appearances, of which The Oprah Winfrey Show had the biggest influence on book sales. In April 2017 a 20th Anniversary edition was published and in a preface to this 20th Anniversary edition Kiyosaki asserts that an estimated 40 million copies of the book had been sold globally.

== Bibliography ==
- Rich Dad Poor Dad: What the Rich Teach Their Kids About Money That the Poor and Middle Class Do Not!, by Robert Kiyosaki and Sharon Lechter. Warner Business Books, 2000.
