= John T. Reed =

American businessman, author, and former real estate investor

John Theodore "Jack" Reed (July 5, 1946 — January 31, 2026) was an American businessman, author, and former real estate investor. Reed wrote and self-published books on real estate investing, football coaching, baseball coaching, success, and self-publishing.

Reed, who claimed many years of experience in property management, considered real estate investment a hands-on business. He began his career writing and publishing "nuts-and-bolts guides devoid of motivational or promotional filler" in 1979. Reed also published the Real Estate Investor’s Monthly newsletter.

The most popular feature on John Reed's website is his real estate "guru" rating, with his opinions of the legitimacy of their claims. Those whom Reed critiqued include Robert G. Allen, Robert Kiyosaki, Carleton Sheets and Russ Whitney. Whitney sued Reed for three years, later withdrawing some of the suits and settling another on confidential terms.

Reed was born in New Jersey and graduated from the United States Military Academy with a B.S. degree in 1968. He was commissioned as a United States Army officer, served in Vietnam from 1969 to 1970 and left active duty in 1972 as a first lieutenant. Reed later earned an M.B.A. degree from the Harvard Business School in 1977.
