= Sharon Lechter =

American accountant, author, and businesswoman

Sharon L. Lechter
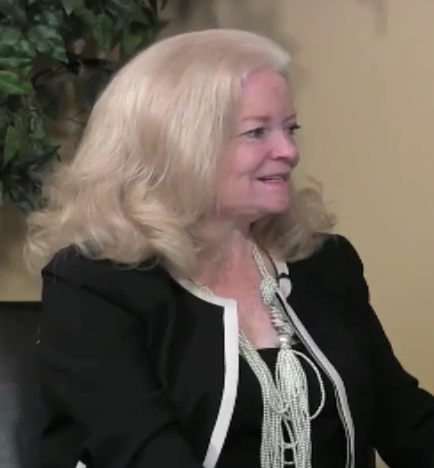
- Lechter in 2011
- Born: January 12, 1954 (age 72)
- Education: Florida State University
- Occupations: CPA, author, businesswoman
- Spouse: Michael Lechter
- Children: 3

Sharon L. Lechter (born January 12, 1954) is an American accountant, author, and businesswoman. She is the co-author of Rich Dad Poor Dad, and the founder and CEO of Pay Your Family First, a financial education organization.

In January 2008, Lechter was appointed to the President's Advisory Council on Financial Literacy to serve a two-year term.

== Personal life ==
Lechter graduated from Florida State University with an Accounting degree in 1979, then worked briefly for a small accounting firm, "Big Eight". She met her husband, Michael Lechter, in 1980. Subsequently, the Lechters met Robert Kiyosaki and, together, formed the Rich Dad companies. Lechter has stated that she held various management positions with unnamed computer, insurance and publishing companies, while maintaining her credentials as a professional CPA.

In 1997, Lechter co-authored the book Rich Dad Poor Dad, along with 14 other books in the Rich Dad series, and was CEO of the Rich Dad company for over 10 years. She also annotated Outwitting the Devil (1938), in cooperation with the Napoleon Hill Foundation, and co-authored its publication, Three Feet from Gold. Lechter co-authored Exit Rich: The 6 P Method to Sell Your Business for Huge Profit in 2021 with Michelle Seiler Tucker.

=== Pay Your Family First ===
In 2007 Lechter created Pay Your Family First, a financial literacy education company.

=== Lawsuit ===
On October 12, 2007, Lechter filed suit against Rich Dad, Poor Dad co-author Robert Kiyosaki in Clark County, NV (Civil Case # 07-A-549886-C). On September 4, 2008, the Lechters and Kiyosakis reached a settlement in their lawsuit.

== Council on Financial Literacy ==
In January 2008, George W. Bush appointed Lechter to the President's Council on Financial Literacy (succeeded by the President's Advisory Council on Financial Capability during the Obama administration).

== Recognitions ==
- Woman of the Year (2013)- National Bank of Arizona honored Sharon with this award
- Positively Powerful Woman Award for Philanthropic Leadership (2012)
- 2016 Edgewater High School Hall of Fame. (Class of 1972)

== Publications ==
Rich Dad Series

Warner Bros./Hachette Publishing – Sharon Lechter as co-author with Robert Kiyosaki:

- Rich Dad, Poor Dad (1997)
- Rich Dad's CASHFLOW Quadrant (1998)
- Rich Dad's Guide to Investing (2000)
- Rich Dad's Rich Kid Smart Kid (2001)
- Rich Dad's Retire Young Retire Rich (2001)
- Rich Dad's Prophecy (2002)
- Rich Dad's Success Stories (2003)
- Rich Dad's Guide to Becoming Rich Without Cutting Up Your Credit Cards (2003)
- Rich Dad's Who Took My Money (2004)
- Rich Dad's Before You Quit Your Job (2005)

Sharon Lechter as author with co-author Garrett Sutton:

- Rich Dad's Real Estate Advantages (2006)

Little Brown/Hachette Publishing – Sharon Lechter as co-author with Robert Kiyosaki:

- Rich Dad Poor Dad for Teens (2004)
- Escape the Rat Race (2005)

VideoPlus – Sharon Lechter as co-author with Robert Kiyosaki:

- The Business School For People Who Like Helping People (2001)

Rich Publishing – Donald Trump and Robert Kiyosaki with Sharon Lechter and Meredith McIver as co-authors:

- Why We Want You to be Rich (2006)
- Rich Woman (2006) – Kim Kiyosaki

=== Rich Dad Advisor Series ===
Warner Bros./Hachette

- Sales Dogs (2001)
- Own Your Own Corporation (2001)
- Protecting Your #1 Asset (2001)
- How to Buy and Sell a Business (2003)
- OPM – Other People's Money (2004)
- The ABC's of Real Estate Investing (2004)
- The ABC's of Getting Out of Debt (2004)
- The ABC's of Writing Winning Business Plans (2005)
- The ABC's of Building a Business Team That Wins (2006)

=== Other publications ===
An Inc. Original – Sharon Lechter as co-author with Michelle Seiler Tucker:

- Exit Rich: The 6 P Method to Sell Your Business for Huge Profit (2021)
