= Do the Work =

2011 non-fiction book by Steven Pressfield

- Author: Steven Pressfield
- Subject: 'resistance'
- Published: 2011
- Publisher: Do You Zoom, Inc; Domino Project
- Preceded by: The War of Art

Do the Work is a 2011 nonfiction book written by American author Steven Pressfield. It is the follow-up book to his 2002 work The War of Art. In it he again presents his theory of the enemy of creative works, 'resistance', which stops individuals from achieving their desired objectives. He outlines the steps to overcome and defeat resistance to achieve artistic, athletic, and business accomplishments that require time and effort.
