= Loral Langemeier =

American writer on finance

- Loral Langemeier
- Born: 1964 or 1965
- Education: Nebraska Wesleyan University (B.A., 1987); University of Nebraska at Omaha (M.S., 1989)
- Occupation: Author
- Website: lorallangemeier.com

Loral Langemeier (born 1964 or 1965) is an American author and financial educator. She founded Live Out Loud, Inc., a financial-education and coaching business, and has written books on personal finance, entrepreneurship and investing. Langemeier appeared in the 2006 documentary film The Secret and on television programs including The Dr. Phil Show.

== Early life and education ==
Langemeier grew up on a family farm in Nebraska. She studied business administration and finance at Nebraska Wesleyan University, graduating in 1987, and earned a master's degree in exercise physiology from the University of Nebraska at Omaha in 1989.

== Career ==
=== Chevron and early work ===
After college, Langemeier worked with Chevron to teach health, fitness and nutrition to employees on offshore oil rigs near New Orleans. She subsequently became a full-time employee and worked in San Francisco. She worked at Chevron for five years before leaving to start her own business.

=== Entrepreneurship ===
Langemeier worked as a master distributor of Robert Kiyosaki's CASHFLOW financial-education board game.

In 2001, she founded Live Out Loud, Inc., a coaching and consulting company based in Novato, California, that provides seminars, workshops and coaching programs on entrepreneurship and wealth building.

Langemeier uses the term "Wealth Cycle" for her financial-education approach, which she describes as a process of earning income, acquiring assets and reinvesting their proceeds. In a January 2006 CNN interview, she discussed income from rental properties, businesses and promissory notes.

In 2007, DreamLife Games released The Millionaire Maker Game, a board game created by Langemeier.

Her programs have included Loral's Big Table, a business and financial-education program for entrepreneurs. In 2018, she began using the Integrated Wealth Systems brand for her financial-education business.

== Books ==
Langemeier co-authored Guerrilla Wealth: The Tactical Secrets of the Wealthy...Finally Revealed with Jay Conrad Levinson in 2004. Her book The Millionaire Maker: Act, Think, and Make Money the Way the Wealthy Do was released by McGraw Hill in December 2005 with a 2006 copyright date. A Publishers Weekly review criticized the book for giving insufficient attention to the risks of the investment strategies it described.

The Millionaire Maker's Guide to Wealth Cycle Investing was released in September 2006 with a 2007 copyright date. In December 2006, Publishers Weekly reported that the book had 85,000 copies in print and had appeared on bestseller lists in The Wall Street Journal, USA Today, and The New York Times.

The Millionaire Maker's Guide to Creating a Cash Machine for Life appeared at No. 5 on The New York Times Advice, How-To, Miscellaneous bestseller list in June 2007. Yes! Energy: The Equation to Do Less, Make More appeared at No. 9 on the Publishers Weekly hardcover nonfiction bestseller list for the week ending February 25, 2012.

Her other books include Put More Cash in Your Pocket: Turn What You Know into Dough (2009) and Make Your Kids Millionaires: The Step-by-Step Guide to Lead Children to Financial Freedom (2022), co-authored with Kyle Boeckman.

== Media appearances ==
Langemeier has appeared on television programs including CNN, CNBC, and Fox News. She has also appeared on The Dr. Phil Show and The View.

She was credited as a financial strategist in the 2006 documentary film The Secret. She was also a guest host on Australia's The Circle.

In 2006, Langemeier appeared on CNN Live Sunday, where she discussed The Millionaire Maker and investments involving rental properties and businesses. In 2007, she appeared on CNN's Showbiz Tonight in a discussion of The Secret.

Langemeier hosts the podcast Real Money Talks, which launched in 2016. She has also appeared as a guest on podcasts including Thrive LouD with Lou Diamond and The Massimo Show.

== Lawsuits ==
Langemeier and her company Live Out Loud have been subjects of lawsuits. In 2022, she was charged by the U.S. Securities and Exchange Commission with selling securities in unregistered oil and gas offerings.

== Philanthropy ==
Langemeier founded Serve Out Loud in 2010, an initiative that offers discounted educational resources to U.S. military veterans. She has made donations to organizations including the Boys & Girls Clubs of America and The Bear League Lake Tahoe.

In 2025, she established the Loral Langemeier Scholarship and the Loral Langemeier Grant, each providing $1,000 per semester to students at accredited U.S. colleges and universities.

== Awards and recognition ==
Langemeier received Nebraska Wesleyan University's Young Alumni Achievement Award in 1995. In 2008, she received the University of Nebraska at Omaha College of Education's Distinguished Alumni Award. Her sorority, Delta Zeta, named her "Woman of the Year" in 2013.

== Personal life ==
Langemeier is a single mother with two children and resides in the Lake Tahoe area.

== Bibliography ==
- Langemeier, Loral; Jay Conrad Levinson. Guerrilla Wealth: The Tactical Secrets of the Wealthy...Finally Revealed. Live Out Loud, Incorporated, 2004. ISBN 978-0-97272539-2.
- ———; The Millionaire Maker: Act, Think, and Make Money the Way the Wealthy Do. McGraw-Hill, 2005 (copyright 2006). ISBN 978-0-07146615-8.
- ———; The Millionaire Maker's Guide to Wealth Cycle Investing: Build Your Assets Into a Lifetime of Financial Freedom. McGraw-Hill, 2006 (copyright 2007). ISBN 978-0-07147872-4.
- ———; The Millionaire Maker's Guide to Creating a Cash Machine for Life. McGraw-Hill, 2007. ISBN 978-0-07148473-2.
- ———; Put More Cash in Your Pocket: Turn What You Know into Dough. HarperBusiness, 2009. ISBN 978-0-06176325-0
- ———; Yes! Energy: The Equation to Do Less, Make More. Hay House, 2012. ISBN 978-1-4019-3647-1
- ———; Kyle Boeckman. Make Your Kids Millionaires: The Step-by-Step Guide to Lead Children to Financial Freedom. McGraw Hill, 2022. ISBN 978-1-26427849-7
