= The Legend of Bagger Vance (novel) =

1995 book by Steven Pressfield

The Legend of Bagger Vance: A Novel of Golf and the Game of Life
- First edition
- Author: Steven Pressfield
- Language: English
- Genre: Fiction
- Published: 1995
- Publisher: William Morrow
- Publication place: United States
- Pages: 288

The Legend of Bagger Vance: A Novel of Golf and the Game of Life is a 1995 American novel by Steven Pressfield that was adapted into the 2000 film The Legend of Bagger Vance.

== Plot ==
During the Great Depression of 1931, two legends of golf, Bobby Jones and Walter Hagen, compete in a 36-hole showdown. Another golfer also competes, a troubled local war hero named R. Junuh with a mentor and caddie, the mysterious Bagger Vance.

=== Similarities to the Hindu epic Mahabharata ===
The plot is loosely based on the Hindu sacred text the Bhagavad Gita, part of the Mahabharata, where the Warrior/Hero Arjuna (R. Junuh) refuses to fight. The god Krishna appears as Bhagavan (Bagger Vance) to help Arjuna follow the path of the warrior and hero that he was meant to take. This relationship was fully explained by Steven J. Rosen in his 2000 book Gita on the Green: The Mystical Tradition Behind Bagger Vance, for which Pressfield wrote the foreword.
