= A Man at Arms =

2021 novel by Steven Pressfield

- First edition
- Author: Steven Pressfield
- Language: English
- Subject: Roman Judea
- Genre: Historical novel
- Published: March 2, 2021 (W.W. Norton & Company)
- ISBN: 978-0-3935-4097-0

A Man at Arms is a historical novel by the American writer Steven Pressfield. It was first published on March 2, 2021 by W.W. Norton & Company. It is Pressfield's first novel taking place in the ancient world since The Afghan Campaign, published in 2006.

== Synopsis ==
The novel takes place in AD 55. In the aftermath of the Crucifixion of Jesus, the office of the Roman governor of Judea receives intelligence of a courier traveling to Corinth with a letter from a "religious fanatic" calling himself Paul the Apostle. Fearing a mass uprising, the governor's agents hire the mercenary soldier Telamon of Arcadia, a former legionary of the Legio X Fretensis, to track down the courier and retrieve the letter, in exchange for a substantial bounty and amnesty for the otherwise capital crime he has been arrested for.

Telamon, a peregrinus who refused an offer of Roman citizenship after his enlistment was over, works only for money, but once he tracks down the courier, he undergoes an unexpected conversion and instead determines to protect the courier at all costs and ensure that the letter is delivered. As apprentice he takes a young Jewish boy named David, and makes the acquaintance of the courier, a man named Michael, and his daughter Ruth, a mute. An old woman jailed by the Romans for being a witch also attaches herself to their party, not out of loyalty to Christianity but out of hatred for the Romans.

Over the course of their journey to Corinth, hunted by an ala of Roman cavalry, they undergo a series of hardships, during which Michael is killed and Telamon realizes that there is no physical letter, but instead that Ruth has memorized it. Reaching Corinth, they are caught up in an uprising of the underground Christian community against the Romans. David and the witch are both killed, but Telamon kills the Roman commander, causing the troops to retreat.

The Christians are divided between followers of Simon who wants to violently overthrow the Romans, and Josepha, who counsels pacifism and believes they have betrayed Christ's teachings by allowing themselves to be drawn into violence. Neither side wants to receive the letter - Josepha feels they don't deserve it, while Simon denounces it as a Roman deception. Telamon is almost killed by a mob of the zealots, before Ruth reveals that she can speak, and recites the letter, emphasizing Paul's words that without charity, a Christian is no Christian at all. Shamed, the zealots release Telamon and allow him to bury David and leave the city. Ruth, having "adopted" Telamon as her new father, chooses to go with him, but agrees to write to Josepha.

== Continuity ==
"Telamon of Arcadia" is also the name of a secondary character from Pressfield's 2000 novel Tides of War, which takes place in Greece four centuries earlier, during the Peloponnesian War (431-404 BC).

== Reception ==
Publishers Weekly reviewed the book negatively, writing that "Pressfield’s considerable gifts for historical military fiction...are nowhere in evidence in this ponderous account of Greek mercenary Telamon of Arcadia’s mission to preserve and disseminate the gospel of Paul." Kirkus Reviews, however, called the book "fine historical fiction".
