= The Legend of Bagger Vance =

2000 sports fantasy drama film by Robert Redford

- Theatrical release poster
- Directed by: Robert Redford
- Screenplay by: Jeremy Leven
- Based on: The Legend of Bagger Vance; 1995 novel by Steven Pressfield
- Produced by: Michael Nozik; Jake Eberts; Robert Redford
- Starring: Will Smith; Matt Damon; Charlize Theron
- Cinematography: Michael Ballhaus
- Edited by: Hank Corwin
- Music by: Rachel Portman
- Production companies: Allied Filmmakers; Wildwood Enterprises
- Distributed by: DreamWorks Pictures (United States and Canada); 20th Century Fox (International)
- Release date: November 3, 2000
- Running time: 126 minutes
- Country: United States
- Language: English
- Budget: $80 million
- Box office: $39.5 million

The Legend of Bagger Vance is a 2000 American sports fantasy drama film directed by Robert Redford, and starring Will Smith, Matt Damon, and Charlize Theron. The screenplay by Jeremy Leven is based on Steven Pressfield's 1995 book The Legend of Bagger Vance: A Novel of Golf and the Game of Life. The film is set in 1931 Georgia. It was the final film starring Jack Lemmon and Lane Smith.

The Legend of Bagger Vance was produced by Allied Filmmakers and Wildwood Enterprises and released on November 3, 2000, by DreamWorks Pictures in the United States and Canada and by 20th Century Fox internationally. The film received mixed to negative reviews and was a box office bomb, grossing $39.5 million against an $80 million budget.

== Plot ==
In old age, having had his sixth heart attack while playing golf, Hardy Greaves contemplates how his late wife used to ask him why he kept playing "a game that seems destined to kill him". Explaining his love for the game, the story begins with his childhood idol: Rannulph Junuh.

Junuh is the favorite son of Savannah, Georgia: a noteworthy golfer from a wealthy family; he and his beautiful girlfriend Adele Invergordon seem to have it all. While serving as a captain in the U.S. Army during World War I, Junuh is traumatized when his entire company is wiped out in battle. Though he receives the Medal of Honor, he disappears after the war, returning to Georgia years later as a broken-down alcoholic.

At the start of the Great Depression (circa 1930), Adele is trying to recover her family's lost fortune by holding a four-round, two-day exhibition match between Bobby Jones and Walter Hagen, the best golfers of the era, with a grand prize of $10,000, at the golf resort her family opened as the Depression struck. However, needing a local participant to gain local interest, a young Greaves speaks up for his hero, Junuh, prompting Adele to ask her estranged lover to play.

Junuh is approached by a mysterious traveler carrying a suitcase, who appears while he is trying to hit golf balls into the dark void of the night. The man identifies himself as Bagger Vance and says he will be his caddy. With Greaves as assistant caddy, Bagger helps Junuh come to grips with his personal demons and play golf again.

When the match starts, Jones and Hagen each play well in their distinctive ways, but the disengaged Junuh plays poorly and is far behind after the first round. With Bagger caddying for him and giving advice, Junuh rediscovers his "authentic swing" in the second round and makes up some ground. In the third round, he closes the gap even more, hitting a hole in one in the process. Meanwhile, Junuh and Adele rekindle their romance.

Late in the final round, an overconfident Junuh disregards Bagger's advice at a crucial point and, after that, plays poorly. He hits a ball into a forest, which triggers a war flashback, but Bagger's words help him focus on the game. Junuh pulls back to a tie with Jones and Hagen, then has a chance to win on the final hole, but has the integrity to call a penalty on himself when his ball moves after trying to remove a loose impediment.

Seeing Junuh has grown and matured, Bagger decides that his golfer does not need him any more. With the 18th hole left unfinished, Bagger gives the position of caddy to Greaves and leaves as mysteriously as he came.

Though losing a chance to win because of the penalty, Junuh sinks an improbable putt and the match ends in a gentlemanly three-way tie. The three golfers shake hands with all of Savannah cheering. Junuh and Adele get back together.

The old Greaves wakes up and sees Bagger Vance, not aged a day, on the golf course. As Bagger beckons, Greaves follows.

== Cast ==
- Will Smith as Bagger Vance
- Matt Damon as Rannulph Junuh
- Charlize Theron as Adele Invergordon
- J. Michael Moncrief as Hardy Greaves
  - Jack Lemmon (uncredited) as Narrator/Old Hardy Greaves
- Bruce McGill as Walter Hagen
- Joel Gretsch as Bobby Jones
- Lane Smith as Grantland Rice
- Harve Presnell as John Invergordon
- Peter Gerety as Neskaloosa
- Michael O'Neill as O. B. Keeler
- Thomas Jay Ryan as Spec Hammond
- Wilbur Fitzgerald as Roy
- E. Roger Mitchell as Aaron

== Production ==
=== Background ===
The plot is loosely based on the Hindu sacred text the Bhagavad Gita, part of the Hindu epic Mahabharata, where the Warrior/Hero Arjuna (R. Junuh) refuses to fight. The god Krishna appears as Bhagavan (Bagger Vance) to help him follow his path as the warrior and hero that he was meant to be. This relationship was explained by Steven J. Rosen in his 2000 book Gita on the Green: The Mystical Tradition Behind Bagger Vance, for which Pressfield wrote the foreword.

=== Filming ===
Portions of the exhibition match were set at the Kiawah Island Golf Resort in South Carolina, United States, considered one of the toughest in the country. The scene in which Greaves has a heart attack was shot on No. 11 of the resort's Cougar Point golf course. The final hole in the film was temporary, so the filming did not interfere with the club activities, and cost US$200,000 to build. Most of the golf scenes were filmed at Colleton River Plantation, just off Hilton Head Island. Certain segments were filmed in Savannah and Jekyll Island, Georgia.

== Reception ==
=== Critical response ===
On Rotten Tomatoes The Legend of Bagger Vance has an approval rating of 43% based on reviews from 130 critics, with an average rating of 5.23/10. The website's critical consensus reads, "Despite the talent involved in The Legend of Bagger Vance, performances are hindered by an inadequate screenplay full of flat characters and bad dialogue. Also, not much happens, and some critics are offended by how the film glosses over issues of racism." On Metacritic, the film has a weighted average score of 47 out of 100, based on 35 critics, indicating "mixed or average reviews". Audiences surveyed by CinemaScore gave the film a grade B+ on scale of A to F.

Film critic Roger Ebert, who gave it 3 1/2 stars, said, "It handles a sports movie the way Billie Holiday handled a trashy song, by finding the love and pain beneath the story. Redford and his writer, Jeremy Leven, starting from a novel by Steven Pressfield, are very clear in their minds about what they want to do. They want to explain why it is possible to devote your life to the love of golf, and they want to hint that golf and life may have a lot in common". The BBC's George Perry called it a "sumptuously photographed film" but added that "in spite of being lovely to look at, it is pretentious piffle, although Will Smith shows skill and subtlety in his ludicrous role".

The film was criticized by several African American commentators and reviewers for employing the "Magical Negro" stereotype. The film would later be cited by Spike Lee as an example of a film with a Magical Negro, stating that "Blacks are getting lynched left and right, and [Bagger Vance is] more concerned about improving Matt Damon's golf swing!"

=== Box office ===
The Legend of Bagger Vance opened at No. 3 at the U.S. box office behind Charlie's Angels and Meet the Parents, grossing $11,516,712 from 2,061 theaters. However, despite having high-profile actors, the film was not a box office success, declining 45.2% in its second weekend to $6,315,993 and then sinking 55.4% to $2,817,983 in its third weekend. Its domestic theatrical run ended with only $30,919,168, while overseas, it would only gross $8,540,259, despite the huge effort which film director Robert Redford’s production company Wildwood Enterprises and Eureka, the European conglomerate of Wildwood, made to make the film a success in Europe. The film's box office gross amounted to $39.5 million against an $80 million budget.

== Soundtrack ==
The now out-of-print soundtrack to The Legend of Bagger Vance was released on November 7, 2000. It was mostly written by Rachel Portman, except for tracks one ("My Best Wishes"), thirteen ("Bluin' the Blues") and fourteen ("Mood Indigo"), which were written by Fats Waller, Muggsy Spanier and Duke Ellington, respectively. The score for this movie was the last to be recorded at CTS Studios in Wembley, England, before the scoring stage's closure and demolition.

Track list

1. My Best Wishes (2:27)
2. The Legend of Bagger Vance (2:11)
3. Savannah Needs a Hero (4:53)
4. Bagger Offers to Caddy for Junuh (4:07)
5. Bagger & Hardy Measure the Course at Night (2:32)
6. The Day of the Match Dawns (3:07)
7. Birdie (1:46)
8. Junuh Sees the Field (5:11)
9. Hole in One (2:30)
10. Junuh Comes Out of the Woods (3:55)
11. Bagger Leaves (3:12)
12. Old Hardy Joins Bagger by the Sea (5:50)
13. Bluin' the Blues (2:27)
14. Mood Indigo (3:07)
- Total soundtrack time: 47:15

== See also ==
- List of films about angels
