= The Profession =

2011 novel by Steven Pressfield

- First edition (publ. Crown Books)
- Author: Steven Pressfield
- Language: English
- Publisher: Crown Books
- Publication date: 2011
- ISBN: 978-0-385-52873-3 (first edition)
- Dewey Decimal: 813.54
- LC Class: PS3566.R3944 P76

The Profession is a 2011 thriller novel by Steven Pressfield. Set in 2032, the novel depicts a highly militarized future where there is severe conflict in the Middle East. A reviewer in the Los Angeles Times favorably compared the novel to Fletcher Knebel and Charles W. Bailey II's 1964 novel Seven Days in May. Kirkus Reviews called the novel "A book that paints an all-too-plausible future in which America outsources its dirtiest jobs."

== Plot ==
The novel follows the actions of a soldier-mercenary named Gentilhomme from Louisiana who follows the prolific, Caesar-like, General Salter, who himself commands a mercenary army after he has been disgraced and exiled from the U.S. 'Gent', for short, is ordered to Egypt to find his old comrade and friend 'El Masri' to aid on a mission into Tajikistan, where a new oil field has been discovered.

At first their orders are to eliminate one warlord and put his son into power in Tajikistan, thus brokering a deal in which Salter will have some control over the rights of the newly discovered oil. However, upon learning of the news that the elder warlord has already been killed, their orders are changed. They eliminate the younger warlord, thus leaving the nation leaderless and in chaos, creating a vacuum that China and Russia rush into and keep them blind from other affairs.

Meanwhile, Salter has taken control of all Saudi Arabian oil reserves and pipelines, strategically rigging them with explosives to be used if threatened. Salter effectively becomes the most powerful man in the world, and begins bargaining away rights to the highest bidders. Salter hopes to seek revenge against those who had him exiled years ago, and also return home as a hero and supreme commander in chief.

Gent, Salter's most loyal soldier and the closest thing to a son he has had since his own son's death, is the only man that can stop him.

== Themes ==
As per most Pressfield books, there are several reoccurring themes that are present in The Profession as well. There is, as always, the theme of warriors uniting in fraternity and under a mystic warrior code. This dynamic is especially strong between Gent and El Masri.

A minor theme is that of reincarnation, or re-occurrence of events, that seem to always find their characters through fate. For example, Gent narrates that he has always had a specific dream that in the end was his destiny in one life and one lived thousands of years before.

There are also references to Alexander the Great which has been the subject of several of Pressfield's novels.

There is a theme of liberty versus empire that is depicted in this novel and manifested in Gent, who has difficulty deciding between the two. It parallels the difficulties of the Roman Empire with the gain of Imperial power at the expense of liberty and freedom of the people. At the end of the novel, the United States republic has a similar end as did the Roman Republic and Salter is even likened to Julius Caesar.
