= Financial intelligence (business) =

Type of business intelligence

Financial intelligence is a type of business intelligence constituted of the knowledge and skills gained from understanding finance and accounting principles in the business world and how money is being used. Although a fairly new term, financial intelligence has its roots in organizational development research, mostly in the field of employee participation. Financial intelligence has emerged as a best practice and core competency in many organizations leading to improved financial results, increased employee morale, and reduced employee turnover. Many organizations include financial intelligence programs in their leadership development curriculum. Financial intelligence is not an innate skill, rather it is a learned set of skills that can be developed at all levels.

== Areas of understanding ==
The four areas of understanding that make up financial intelligence are:

Understanding the foundation. Financial intelligence requires an understanding of the basics of financial measurement including the income statement, the balance sheet, and the cash flow statement. It also requires knowing the difference between cash and profit and why a balance sheet balances.

Understanding the art. Finance and accounting are an art as well as a science. The two disciplines must try to quantify what can't always be quantified, and so must rely on rules, estimates, and assumptions. Financial intelligence ensures people are able to identify where the artful aspects of finance have been applied to the numbers, and know how applying them differently might lead to different conclusions.

Understanding analysis. Financial intelligence includes the ability to analyze the numbers in greater depth. This includes being able to calculate profitability, leverage, liquidity and efficiency ratios and understanding the meaning of the results. Conducting ROI analysis and interpreting the results are also part of financial intelligence.

Understanding the big picture. Financial intelligence also means being able to understand a business's financial results in context - that is, within the framework of the big picture. Factors such as the economy, the competitive environment, regulations and changing customer needs and expectations as well as new technologies all affect how the numbers are interpreted.

Financial intelligence is not just theoretical book learning. It also requires practice and real world application. In the corporate world, managers can display financial intelligence by speaking the language, that is, asking questions about the numbers when something doesn't make sense, reviewing financial reports and using the information to understand the company's strengths and weaknesses, using ROI analysis, working capital management, and ratio analysis to make decisions, and identifying where the art of finance has been applied.

== Roots of financial intelligence ==
In 1954, Peter F. Drucker, in his groundbreaking book, The Practice of Management, wrote the following.

"[The worker] should know how his work relates to the work of the whole. He should know what he contributes to the enterprise...if he lacks information, he will lack both incentive and means to improve his performance."

"It is in the best interest of the organization that the worker have the information."

The concept of financial intelligence in organizations comes from the research of several well-known organizational development academics, including Dennis Denison, Edward Lawler and Jeffrey Pfeffer. For example, the research of Lawler, Mohrman and Ledford found that the indices that have the most impact on both direct performance outcomes in organizations (productivity, customer satisfaction, quality and speed) and on profitability and competitiveness were sharing information and developing knowledge.

Karen Berman's research, asked specifically if information (operationalized by teaching business basics to improve financial intelligence and sharing information on a regular basis) improves the results of employee participation, as seen through organizational performance improvement and employee attitude improvement. The results of the study found that certain financial performance measures improved and that employee turnover decreased.
Financial literacy also has its roots in open book management. A core tenet of open-book management is business literacy, that is, ensuring everyone understands how the business measures financial success.

== Financial intelligence in organizations ==
Many companies, (Southwest Airlines being a prime example) consider financial intelligence a core competency or best practice. Several universities, including Harvard Business School, Wharton and Stanford have programs targeted at the corporate world, mostly at the leadership level, to increase the financial intelligence in organizations. There are a variety of methods to increase financial intelligence in organizations, including classroom training, webinar training, and business simulations.

Proponents of financial intelligence in organizations believe that if employees, managers and leaders understand financial information and how financial success is measured, they will make decisions and take action based on an understanding of the financial impact of those decisions. If everyone knows the financial goals of the company, for example, and knows how to make decisions that support those financial goals, then the company is going to be more financially successful.

Employee owned companies are one group of organizations that are focused on ensuring everyone in the company is financially intelligent, as employees are owners and therefore must understand the financial side of the business.
