= Think Big (store) =

PopEye Production was original name

Think Big! was a retail store originally established in New York City in 1979. It was closed in 1994.

Think Big! logo

== History ==
The store was a joint endeavor by two friends, an artist Phyllis Prinz and a business man Robert Malkin. The two, who had an affinity for collecting oversized antique display pieces, opened their store against the advice of friends and experts. The product line started with a small offering consisting of giant 6 foot pencils and replicas of giant 5-foot Crayola crayons.

The entrepreneurs had great success and expanded into a nationwide catalog retail concept. The Think Big! product line grew to offer over 100 different larger-than-life objects. With the added success of catalog sales many franchise locations began to open across the country as the pop art style caught on through the 1980s. The unique creations have been featured in many films including Forrest Gump and Big both starring Tom Hanks.

Think Big! catalogs

Think Big flourished in the 1980s, when the scaled-up aesthetic was popular. Other companies, such as Swatch, also created comically large versions of their wares. In the early 1990s the retailer was at its peak and was sold to the high-end art gallery firm Martin Lawrence Galleries. The gallery already had many retail locations and attracted the interest of pop art fans with their huge collection of Andy Warhol and Roy Lichtenstein artwork. However, the Think Big franchise stores began to disappear, subject to high-rent retail locations and increased expense for catalog production.

By 1994, all retail locations of Think Big had been closed down by Martin Lawrence Galleries. The gallery's collection of Warhol art was diminishing and the economy took a downturn. The gallery mailed out the last Think Big! catalog in 1994 and refocused on expanding its collection of high-end art to include a broader variety of printed artworks.

After about 5 years in hibernation, the Think Big product line was rejuvenated by the boom of the Internet and the determination of Jeff Bruette when he founded GreatBigStuff. GreatBigStuff is an online-only retailer of oversized versions of everyday objects. In 2001, Bruette located a former Martin Lawrence executive who owned all of the remaining Think Big inventory from 1994 and worked out a trade agreement - three of Bruette's personal Warhol's in exchange for all the remaining inventory. GreatBigStuff have since redesigned and resurrected many of the original Think Big Products.
