= The Virtues of War =

2004 novel by Steven Pressfield

- First edition (publ. Doubleday)
- Author: Steven Pressfield
- Language: English
- Publisher: Doubleday
- Publication date: 2004
- ISBN: 0-385-50099-8 (first edition)
- Dewey Decimal: 813.54
- LC Class: PS3566.R3944 V57

The Virtues of War is a 2004 historical fiction novel by Steven Pressfield that follows the life of Alexander the Great, told through the eyes of a Hellenic-Persian scribe serving under him during his campaigns into India. Alexander is recounting the events of his life to the young scholar just before he dies in Babylon.

Alexander first recounts of his younger days serving under his father, Philip II of Macedon, and Philip's expansion of Macedonian hegemony throughout Greece and Thrace. After his father's assassination, Alexander assumes control of the Macedonian throne and re-subdues Greece. He invades the Persian empire, eventually conquering it all, and continues into Afghanistan and into India. The final battle fought is the Battle of the Hydaspes in which Alexander solidifies his rule over the Indians.

Throughout the novel, Alexander is portrayed as a benevolent king who only ever wanted to be a soldier, attain military glory, and treat his enemies with honor in the hopes of eventually making them his friends.

== Reception ==
Kirkus Reviews praises Pressfield's writing calling it "deft and graceful as always in his historical authenticity".
