= The Warrior Ethos =

2011 book by Steven Pressfield

First edition (publ. Black Irish Entertainment LLC)

The Warrior Ethos is a 2011 nonfiction book by American author Steven Pressfield in which he contemplates the nature of the warrior code and the rules a warrior, even a metaphorical one, must follow. He relates several examples from history from the stand of the Spartans at Thermopylae to the defeat of the inner vices as described in the Bhagavad Gita.

Pressfield does not define a warrior as a specific martial profession, but broadens it to embrace anyone who faces a conflict they must overcome through trial and effort. There is a warrior code that is unwritten but seems to be almost universally understood by various warrior cultures around the world. If the code is embraced, it seems to claim any enemy can be conquered, both internal and external.
