= The Afghan Campaign =

Historical novel by Steven Pressfield

- First edition
- Author: Steven Pressfield
- Language: English
- Subject: Alexander the Great
- Genre: Historical novel
- Published: 2006 (Doubleday)
- ISBN: 978-0-7679-2238-8

The Afghan Campaign is a historical novel by the American writer Steven Pressfield. It was first published in 2006 by Doubleday. It is the story of Alexander the Great's invasion of the Afghan kingdoms (the Afghanistan of today) in 330 BC through the eyes of Matthias (Μαντίθεος in Greek), a young soldier from Macedonia, who narrates the adventures of the Macedonian army against the Eastern warriors. Matthias fights for Alexander the Great's infantry confronting ferocious people who, determined to defend their homeland, follow tough war methods.

Many pages of the book are dedicated to Alexander's army's fight against the Persian Spitamenes (Σπιταμένης in Greek), the Wolf of the Desert, whose army follows the barbarian war method contrary to their rivals who make war in array. Pressfield presents the brutalities and ferocities of both parties while he does not omit to refer to the vanity and voraciousness of Alexander the Great who in the last pages of the novel marries the Bactrian Roxane (Ρωξάνη in Greek), daughter of Oxyartes. Having thus safeguarded his rights in the kingdoms of Orient, he sets off to conquer India crossing the mountains of Indian Caucasus. He leaves behind him many thousands of footmen and horsemen (one fifth of his army) to deter the indigenous people from possible insurrections and outbreaks within the conquered land.

== Plot ==
Young Matthias from Macedonia follows his two older brothers’ example and enrolls in Alexander's cavalry together with his close friend Lygaios/Lucas (Λυγαίος in Greek). This special convoy departs from Tripoli, Lebanon and after 125 days of marching meets the rear of Alexander's army. The hero takes part into his first battle and is shocked by the atrocities of his adversaries and his own people as well. Noteworthy is the fact that the enemy, apart from its guerilla methods, recruits women and children to fight for their freedom.

While marching, Matthias meets Shinar, an Afghan woman who, having abandoned her own people, offers her services as carrier of the Greek army's supplies. Nanguali is the barbarian warrior's code; its three elements are: honour, revenge and hospitality. Their women's honour, if blackened, could be redeemed (turn back into white) only by death. Matthias stands up to Baz, Shinar's brother, but fails to reach a compromise and is deceived by Baz, who in the end kills his sister and her baby.

At the end of the story, Matthias is left with nothing – he has lost his family, friends, health and hope. Instead of returning home (his wife and son having been killed) as initially planned and having nothing to lose, he decides to follow the Greek army in its way to India.

== Reception ==
The novel was well received by critics who found it a "vivid, compelling tale about the challenges of the war", and that through the characters we learn something about human nature.
