= Steven Pressfield =

American novelist (born 1943)

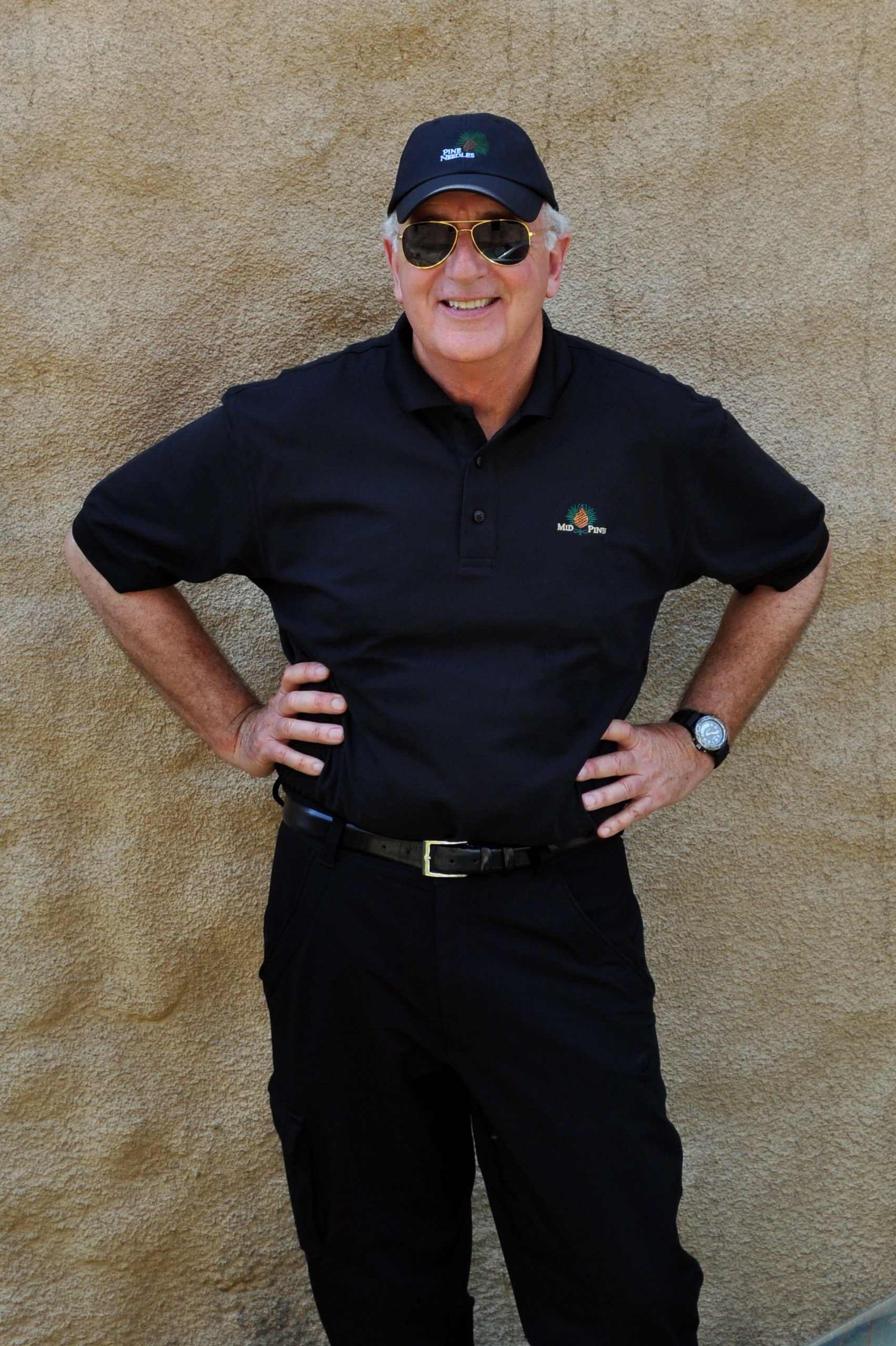
- Pressfield in June 2011
- Born: September 1, 1943 (age 83); Port of Spain, Trinidad
- Education: Duke University (BA)
- Occupation: Author
- Writing career
- Genres: Historical fiction Military fiction Nonfiction
- Notable works: The Legend of Bagger Vance; Gates of Fire; The Afghan Campaign; The Virtues of War; The Warrior Ethos

Steven Pressfield (born September 1, 1943) is an American author of historical fiction, nonfiction, and screenplays, including his 1995 novel The Legend of Bagger Vance and 2002 nonfiction book The War of Art.

== Early life ==
Pressfield was born in Port of Spain, Trinidad, in 1943, while his father was stationed there, in the U.S. Navy.

== Education ==
Pressfield graduated from Duke University in 1965. In 1966, he joined the U.S. Marine Corps, serving as an infantryman.

== Career ==
Pressfield was an advertising copywriter, schoolteacher, tractor-trailer driver, bartender, oilfield roustabout, attendant in a mental hospital, fruit-picker in Washington state, and screenwriter. His struggles to make a living as an author, including the period when he was homeless and living out of the back of his car, are detailed in his 2002 book The War of Art.

Pressfield's first book, The Legend of Bagger Vance, which was loosely based on the Bhagavad Gita, was published in 1995, and was made into a 2000 film of the same name directed by Robert Redford and starring Will Smith, Charlize Theron, and Matt Damon.

His second novel, Gates of Fire (1998), is about the Spartans and the battle at Thermopylae. It is taught at the U.S. Military Academy, the United States Naval Academy, and the Marine Corps Basic School at Quantico.

In 2012, Pressfield launched the publishing house Black Irish Books with his agent Shawn Coyne.

== Works ==
=== Fiction ===
- The Legend of Bagger Vance, about a young man coming to terms with his spiritual demons through the medium of golf (1995). Adapted into the film The Legend of Bagger Vance (2000).
- Gates of Fire, about the Battle of Thermopylae (1998), ISBN 0385492510. The novel is studied at West Point, the USNA and other military institutions, and topped the list of bestsellers in Greece.
- Tides of War, a novel of Alcibiades and the Peloponnesian War (2000), ISBN 0385492529
- Last of the Amazons, in which Theseus, the legendary King of Athens, sets sail to the north coast of the Black Sea inhabited by a race of female warriors (2002), ISBN 038550098X
- The Virtues of War, about Alexander the Great (2004), ISBN 0385500998
- The Afghan Campaign, about Alexander the Great's conquests in Afghanistan (2006), ISBN 038551641X
- Killing Rommel (2008), a fictionalized account of a patrol of the British Long Range Desert Group during the North African Campaign of World War II, ISBN 0385519702
- The Profession (2011), ISBN 9780385528733. Pressfield's first book set in the future, where military force is for hire everywhere. Oil companies, multinational corporations and banks employ powerful, cutting-edge mercenary armies to control global chaos and protect their riches.
- 36 Righteous Men (2020), ISBN 0393358402, a futuristic noir thriller.
- A Man at Arms (2021), ISBN 9780393540970, a novel set in Jerusalem and the Sinai desert in the first century AD.

=== Nonfiction ===
- The War of Art: Break Through the Blocks and Win Your Inner Creative Battles (2002), a motivational book that investigates the psychology of creating art and how "writer's block" can be cured. ISBN 9781936891023
- Do The Work (2011), ISBN 9781936719013
- The Warrior Ethos (2011), ISBN 9781936891009
- Turning Pro (2012), ISBN 9781936891030
- The Authentic Swing: Notes from the Writing of First Novel (2013), ISBN 9781936891139
- The Lion's Gate: On the Front Lines of the Six Day War (2014), ISBN 9781595230911
- An American Jew: A Writer Confronts His Own Exile and Identity (2015), ISBN 9781936891412
- Nobody Wants to Read Your Sh*t: Why That Is and What You Can Do About It (2016), ISBN 9781936891498
- The Artist's Journey: The Wake of the Hero's Journey and the Lifelong Pursuit of Meaning (2018), ISBN 9781936891542
- Put Your Ass Where Your Heart Wants to Be (2022), ISBN 9798986164311
- Govt Cheese a memoir (2022), ISBN 9798986164397
- The Daily Pressfield (2023), ISBN 9798987871607

== Filmography ==
Prior to publishing his first original works of fiction, Pressfield wrote several Hollywood screenplays including 1986's King Kong Lives, 1988's Above the Law starring Steven Seagal and directed by Andrew Davis, 1992's Freejack, a work of science fiction starring Emilio Estevez, Mick Jagger, and Anthony Hopkins, and 1993's Joshua Tree (a.k.a. Army of One) starring Dolph Lundgren and George Segal. Joshua Tree was directed by Academy Award and Bafta winning stuntman Vic Armstrong.

His novel The Legend of Bagger Vance was made into a 2000 film starring Matt Damon as the golf pro and Will Smith as his spiritual guide and was widely criticized for its use of the "Magical Negro" as a plot device.

Pressfield also appeared as one of the historians in The History Channel's 2007 documentary Last Stand of the 300 and a commentator on an episode of the History Channel's Decisive Battles series featuring Alexander the Great on July 30, 2004.

== Additional sources ==
- Pressfield, Steven. (2012 ed.). War of Art. New York/Los Angeles: Black Irish Books. ISBN 978-1-936891-02-3
- Pressfield, Steven. (2012 ed.). Turning Pro. New York/Los Angeles: Black Irish Books. ISBN 978-1936891-03-0
