= Middle-class squeeze =

Decline in middle-class real wages and increase in economic inequality

The middle-class squeeze refers to negative trends in the standard of living and other conditions of the middle class of the population. In a middle-class squeeze situation, increases in median income fails to keep up with inflation, leading to a relative decline in real wages, while at the same time, the phenomenon fails to have a similar effect on the top wage earners. People belonging to the middle class find that inflation in consumer goods and the housing market prevent them from maintaining a middle-class lifestyle, undermining aspirations of upward mobility.

== Overview ==
=== Origin of the term ===
Former U.S. Speaker of the House Nancy Pelosi used the term in November 2006 to provide context to the domestic agenda of the U.S. Democratic Party. The Center for American Progress (CAP) issued a report of the same title in September 2014. The term was further propelled into the public consciousness when it was used by former UK Labour Party leader Ed Miliband, who promised to defend the middle class in 2010.

=== Definitions ===
The term "squeeze" in this instance refers to rising costs of key products and services coupled with stagnant or declining real (inflation-adjusted) wages.

This squeeze is also characterized by the fact that since the early 1980s, when European integration got into full swing, Belgium, France, Germany, Italy, and the United Kingdom have experienced strong real wage growth, while real wage growth in the United States has generally remained sluggish in comparison.

== Causes ==
Causes include factors related to income as well as costs.

=== Income changes ===
Another narrative described by Paul Krugman is that a resurgence of movement conservatism since the 1970s, embodied by Reaganomics in the United States during the 1980s, resulted in a variety of policies that favored owners of capital and natural resources over laborers. Many other developed countries did not have an increase in inequality similar to the United States over the period from 1980 to 2006, though they were subjected to the same market forces due to globalization. This indicates U.S. policy was a major factor in widening inequality.

Either way, the shift is visible when comparing productivity and wages. From 1950 to 1970, improvement in real compensation per hour tracked improvement in productivity. This was part of the implied contract between workers and owners.

==== Historical perspective ====
In 1995, 60% of American workers were laboring for real wages below previous peaks, while at the median, “real wages for nonsupervisory workers were down 13% from peak 1973 levels.”

The other way in which income affects the middle class is through increases in income disparity. Findings on this issue show that the top 1% of wage earners continue to increase the share of income they bring home, while the middle-class wage earner loses purchasing power as their wages fail to keep up with inflation and taxation.

A 2001 article from TIME Magazine highlighted the development of the middle-class squeeze. The middle class was defined in that article as those families with incomes between the Census Bureau brackets of $15,000 and $49,999. According to the census, the proportion of American families in that category, after adjustment for inflation, fell from 65.1% in 1970 to 58.2% in 1985. As noted in the article, the heyday of the American middle class, and its high expectations, came in the 1950s and 60s, when the median U.S. family income (adjusted to 2001 price levels) rose from $14,832 in 1950 to $27,338 in 1970. The rising prosperity was, however, halted by the inflation of the 1970s, which carried prices aloft more rapidly than wages and thus caused real income levels to stagnate for more than a decade. The median income in 2000 was only $27,735, barely an improvement from 1970.

==== Health care ====
The number of people who are uninsured has also increased since 2000, with 45.7 million Americans now without health insurance, compared to 38.7 million at the start of the millennium. Also, 18% of middle income Americans (making between 40,000 and 59,999 dollars) were without health insurance during 2007, and more than 40% of the 2.4 million newly uninsured Americans were middle class in 2003.

=== Other factors ===
==== Job security changes ====
More than 92% of the 1.6 million Americans who filed for bankruptcy in 2003 were middle class.

==== Debt ====
Debt is cited as a cause of middle-class squeeze, especially when interest rates are high (which raises monthly debt payments).

== Criticism ==
In a 2012 Brookings Institution article, economist Richard Burkhauser blames a misleading and narrow focus on the 1 percent as well as a dishonestly narrow definition of “income” that ignores the value of non-monetary work benefits and government transfer payments for propagating the myth. He argues that if the value of government benefits and payments to low-income Americans is included, the problem of income inequality comes into question. Burkhauser calculates the impact of government transfers, the value of health insurance not paid for by households and the decline in household size to find that the bottom 20 percent had about 25 percent more income in 2007 than 1979; thus, it could be seen that the bottom is in fact moving up.

When comparing household incomes over time, critics of the middle-class squeeze emphasise the need to look at identical households. The U.S. Census Bureau defines a household as one or more persons living in the same abode. Fifty years ago, only 15% of all U.S. households had a single occupant; however, by 2017, that percentage had nearly doubled to 28% percent. Thus, the typical household today is much smaller, which could be causing a perceived shrinkage.

== See also ==
- Cost of living – Cost to live based on price of necessities
- Cost of living crisis – Situation where prices of essentials rise faster than wages
- Economic inequality – Distribution of income or wealth between different groups
