= The Learning Annex =

American education company

- Type: Privately held company
- Industry: Education
- Founded: New York City (1980)
- Headquarters: New York City, New York, United States
- Products: Real Estate Wealth Expo, Trump Expo
- Revenue: US$102 million (2007)
- Number of employees: 114 (2007)
- Website: learningannex.com

The Learning Annex is an American education company based in New York City. It was founded in 1980 by Bill Zanker in his New York City studio apartment with a $5,000 investment.

The Learning Annex offers a wide range of classes on diverse topics such as "How to Develop & Write a Winning Business Plan", "How To Manufacture Your Products", "How to Sing Professionally", "Hair how-to by Frederic Fekkai", "Intro to Pole Dancing", "How to Write a Book Proposal That Publishers Can't Refuse", "How to Talk to Your Cat", "How to Buy Foreclosed Property", "Make Contact with Lost Loved Ones", "How to Shoot Your Own Live Adult Video", "Kabbalah-Dating", "How to Create Magical Spells", "Discover Your Past Lives – Who Were You Before?", "How to Make Your Own Soap", and "How to Marry the Rich".

The Learning Annex achieved pop culture status with references to it appearing on Sex and the City and other television shows as well as being a subject of monologues and a component of movie and television plots.

In 1991, Zanker filed for bankruptcy and sold the Learning Annex. He repurchased it in 2002.

In 2006, the company started offering "Real Estate Wealth Expo" events featuring prominent speakers such as George Foreman, Donald Trump, televangelist Paula White, and motivational speaker Tony Robbins. Trump was reported to have received $1.5 million for each of the 17 one-hour presentations he did for The Learning Annex's "real estate wealth expos" in 2006 and 2007. In a court deposition two years later, Trump admitted that he was paid $400,000.

The Learning Annex was No. 346 on the 2007 Inc. 5000 (a list of the nation's fastest-growing private companies) with a reported three year growth of 794.1%, revenue of $102 million, and 114 employees. Later in 2007, it ceased its operations in Toronto, Canada.
