= Robert Kiyosaki =

American finance author and investor (born 1947)

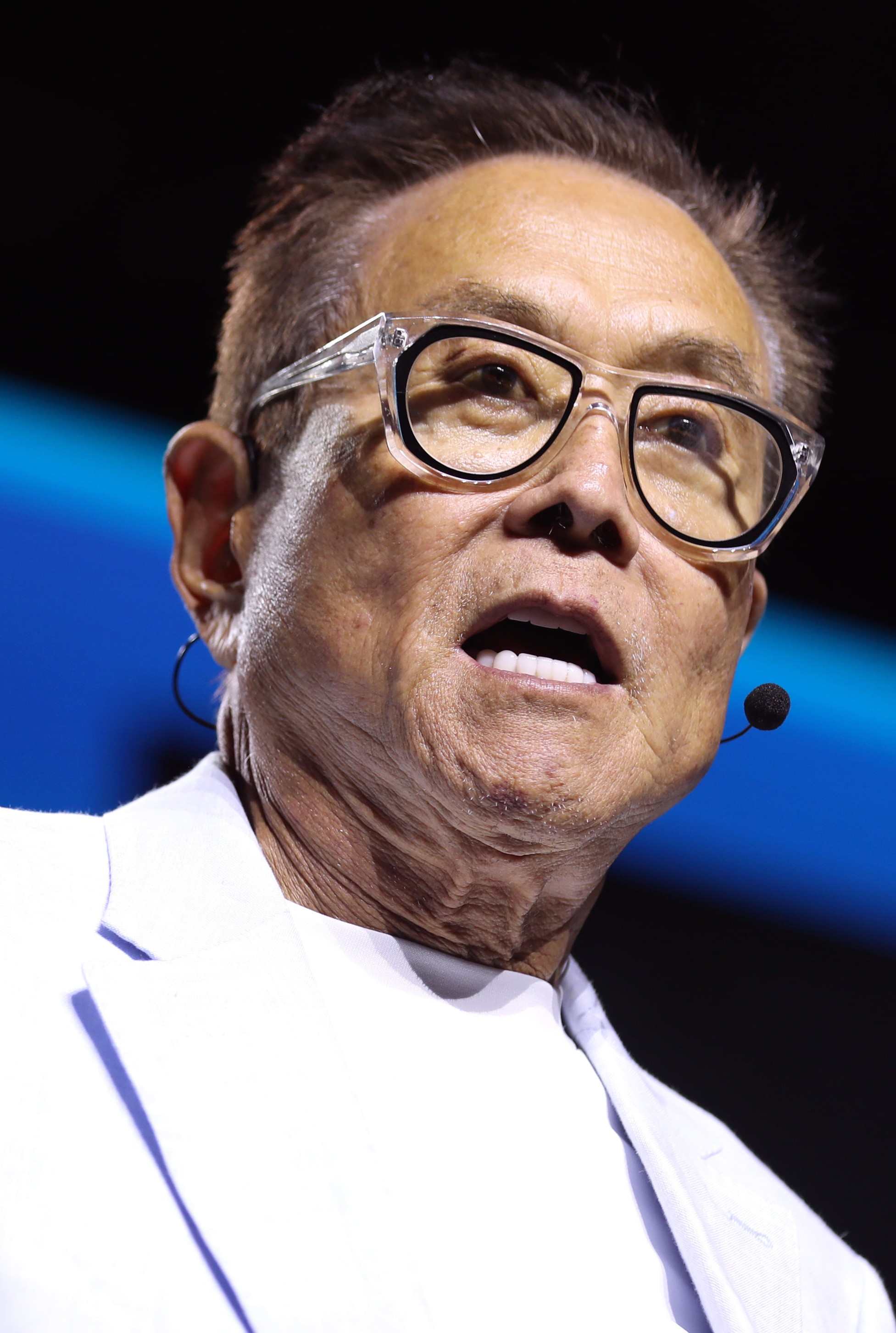
- Kiyosaki in 2024
- Born: Robert Toru Kiyosaki; April 8, 1947 (age 79); Hilo, Territory of Hawaii, U.S.
- Occupations: Businessman, author
- Spouse: Kim Meyer (m. 1986; div. 2017)
- Writing career
- Years active: 1973–1994; 1997–present
- Subjects: Personal finance, business investing
- Notable work: Rich Dad Poor Dad
- Website: www.richdad.com

Robert Toru Kiyosaki (born April 8, 1947) is an American businessman, entrepreneur, and author, known for the Rich Dad Poor Dad series of personal finance books. He founded the Rich Dad Company, which provides personal finance and business education through books and videos, and Rich Global LLC, which filed for bankruptcy in 2012.

Kiyosaki was sued in a class action suit filed by attendees of his seminars, and is the subject of investigative documentaries by the CBC, WTAE-TV and CBS News.

== Early life and education ==
Kiyosaki was born in 1947 in Hilo, Territory of Hawaii to Ralph (d. 1991) and Majorie Kiyosaki, who was a nurse. He is the eldest child of a family of Japanese descent. One of his sisters, Tenzin Kacho, was a nun ordained by the Dalai Lama who worked at a Buddhist center in Long Beach, California. The other sister is a graphic designer, and his brother works in property management.

Kiyosaki's father was an educator, once appointed as Hawaii's superintendent of schools. He also ran unsuccessfully for lieutenant-governor in the Republican Party ticket in the 1970 Hawaii gubernatorial election. He lost his job after the election and used his savings to acquire an ice-cream franchise that eventually failed. He later worked for labor unions.

Kiyosaki attended Manoa Elementary School before moving to Hilo. He then graduated from Hilo High School, from which he was nearly expelled due to poor grades. In 1965, he attended the United States Merchant Marine Academy, graduating four years later as a deck officer. After traveling on ships of Matson, Inc. as a midshipman, he joined the U.S. Marine Corps as an officer. Kiyosaki served as a helicopter gunship pilot during the Vietnam War and was once based in Kaneohe Bay.

== Career ==
=== Early enterprises ===
In 1977, Kiyosaki started a company called "Rippers" that marketed nylon and Velcro wallets. After the company went bankrupt, he became a sales associate at Xerox until June 1978.

In the 1980s, Kiyosaki became a motivational speaker in San Diego who ran a course on Erhard Seminars Training (EST) techniques called Money and You. He had attended the course in 1974 given by the course's creator, Marshall Thurber. In 1984, Thurber transferred the business to Kiyosaki and D.C. Cordova, who then expanded the course beyond the U.S. The course at one point had tens of thousands of students internationally.

The business nearly collapsed in Australia in October 1993 after the Australian Broadcasting Corporation's Four Corners program aired a documentary about emotional abuse in the course. The documentary interviewed several past course attendees who "felt like they were being brainwashed." One participant said "he was depressed and mentally and physically devastated after attending, and said it took him two weeks to recover." The program included footage of a Money and You course in which people were "driven to the depths of despair or to near-hysteria." An expert on cults noted similarities between Kiyosaki's course and the methods of Scientology. Kiyosaki said the program was "unfair" and considered suing the ABC before deciding against it. He left the business in 1994.

=== Financial education efforts ===
In 1993, Kiyosaki published his first book, If You Want to Be Rich and Happy, Don't Go to School? In his book, he encouraged parents not to send their children to college and instead to enter the real estate business. Kiyosaki founded Cashflow Technologies (in 1997), a holding company that as of 2002 owned and operated the Rich Dad brand—as well as the Cashflow brand—a holding company that as of that year, Kiyosaki was "preparing to phase himself out of". Kiyosaki created the Cashflow board and video games to educate adults and children about business and financial concepts.

Kiyosaki settled a lawsuit in 2008 brought by Sharon Lechter, his former business partner, with an undisclosed sum. Lechter said Kiyosaki and his wife had enriched themselves and redirected assets in the business, which the Kiyosakis denied. She sold her stake in Rich Dad Company to them after the settlement and ended the partnership that lasted about 10 years.

== Other businesses ==
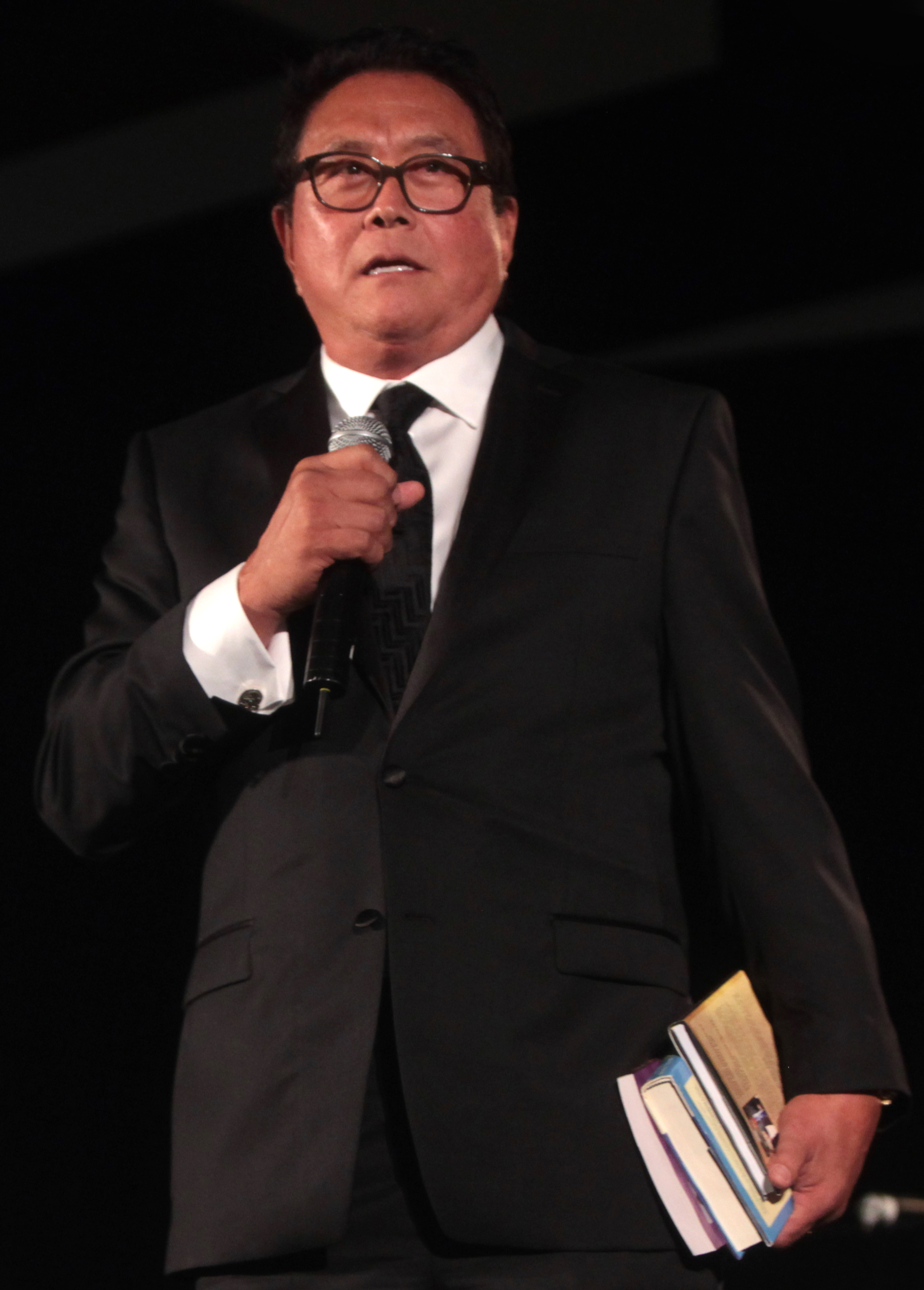
Kiyosaki in 2014

Kiyosaki's earlier two businesses (for surfing bags with Velcro fasteners and T-shirts) went bankrupt.

Kiyosaki operates through a number of companies that he owns fully or in part, and through franchisee arrangements with other companies authorized to use his name for a fee. This includes Rich Dad LLC, Whitney Information Network, Rich Dad Education and Rich Dad Academy. The company's main revenues come from franchisees of the Rich Dad seminars that are conducted by independent individuals using Kiyosaki's brand name.

In 2012, Kiyosaki's company, Rich Global LLC, filed for bankruptcy and was ordered to pay $23.7 million to The Learning Annex and its founder, because Kiyosaki had used The Learning Annex for speaking opportunities. Mike Sullivan, the CEO of Rich Dad Company, one of at least 10 companies through which Kiyosaki conducts business, said Rich Global LLC had been dormant for years. At bankruptcy, the company had nearly $26 million in liabilities and $1.8 million in assets.

== Business and financial advice ==
Kiyosaki has authored more than 26 books including Rich Dad Poor Dad, which has been translated into dozens of languages. As of 2017, nearly 40 million copies of the book had been sold. He said his books were an advertisement for his higher-priced seminars.

Kiyosaki's financial and business teachings claim that financial independence can be achieved through passive income. He also claims that wealth cannot be achieved from going to school and obtaining a traditional job.

He advocates for using what he calls "good debt" as leverage to buy financial assets such as real estate. In January 2024, Kiyosaki stated that he had more than $1 billion in debt. Additionally, he is a strong proponent of buying gold and silver, often referring to them as "God's money." In May 2025, Kiyosaki reiterated his advocacy for cryptocurrency, writing on X (formerly Twitter) that even holding 0.01 Bitcoin could "maybe make you very rich" within two years. In 2006 and 2007, Kiyosaki's Rich Dad seminars continued to promote real estate as a sound investment, just before their prices came crashing down.

In 2010, the Canadian Broadcasting Corporation's Marketplace broadcast a documentary on scams that were being perpetuated by Kiyosaki's company in Canada in the guise of "Rich Dad" seminars. Investments in trailers and trailer parks, which seminar instructors claimed to be evidence of success, were found to be barren and unused land.

Also in 2010, Allan Roth of CBS News documented what occurred when he attended one of Rich Dad's free seminars and dissected some of the tactics employed.

WTAE-TV, the ABC television station in Pittsburgh, Pennsylvania, produced another critical segment about Kiyosaki in 2013.

Kiyosaki's advice has also been criticized for emphasizing anecdotes and no concrete advice on how readers should proceed or work.

== Personal life ==
Kiyosaki divorced from his first wife when he was 32.

Kiyosaki met his second wife and business partner Kimberly "Kim" Kiyosaki (née Meyer) in 1984, and they got married in 1986. They amicably divorced in 2017.

When asked about his net worth, Kiyosaki claimed to be more than $1 billion in debt, indicating that being such was not, in his view, "his problem".

=== Political views ===
Kiyosaki endorsed and supported Republican candidate Donald Trump for the 2016 presidential elections. At that time (2015), Kiyosaki had co-authored two books with Trump (and others). Kiyosaki has also criticized Bernie Sanders for being a "hardcore Marxist".

== Published works ==
- Rich Dad Poor Dad – What the Rich Teach Their Kids About Money – That the Poor and Middle Class Do Not! (first published in 1997) Warner Business Books. ISBN 0-446-67745-0.
- Cashflow Quadrant: Rich Dad's Guide to Financial Freedom (2000). ISBN 0-446-67747-7.
- Rich Dad's Guide to Investing: What the Rich Invest in, That the Poor and the Middle Class Do Not! (2000). ISBN 0-446-67746-9.
- The Business School for People Who Like Helping People (March 2001). ISBN 99922-67-42-9 – endorses multi-level marketing
- Rich Dad's Rich Kid, Smart Kid: Giving Your Children a Financial Headstart (2001). ISBN 0-446-67748-5.
- Rich Dad's Retire Young, Retire Rich (2002). ISBN 0-446-67843-0.
- Rich Dad's Prophecy: Why the Biggest Stock Market Crash in History Is Still Coming… and How You Can Prepare Yourself and Profit from It! (2002). Warner Books. ISBN 0-641-62241-4.
- Rich Dad's The Business School: For People Who Like Helping People (2003) ISBN 979-686-729-X.
- Rich Dad's Who Took My Money?: Why Slow Investors Lose and Fast Money Wins! (2004) ISBN 0-446-69182-8.
- Rich Dad, Poor Dad for Teens: The Secrets About Money – That You Don't Learn in School! (2004) ISBN 0-446-69321-9.
- Rich Dad's Before You Quit Your Job: 10 Real-Life Lessons Every Entrepreneur Should Know About Building a Multimillion-Dollar Business (2005). ISBN 0-446-69637-4.
- Why We Want You to Be Rich: Two Men, One Message (2006) with co-authors Donald Trump, Meredith McIver, and Sharon L. Lechter. ISBN 1933914025, Newark, NJ: Rich Publications LLC. See this or this link, accessed August 6, 2025.
- Rich Dad's Increase Your Financial IQ: Get Smarter with Your Money (2008). ISBN 0-446-50936-1.
- Rich Dad's Conspiracy of the Rich: The 8 New Rules of Money (2009). ISBN 0-446-55980-6
- The Real Book of Real Estate: Real Experts. Real Stories. Real Life. (2009) ISBN 1-4587-7250-0.
- An Unfair Advantage: The Power of Financial Education (2011). ISBN 1-61268-010-0.
- Midas Touch: Why Some Entrepreneurs Get Rich And Why Most Don't (2011), with coauthor Donald Trump. ISBN 978-1612680958, Scottsdale, AZ: Plata Publishing. See this or this link, accessed August 6, 2025.
- Why 'A' Students Work for 'C' Students and Why 'B' Students Work for the Government: Rich Dad's Guide to Financial Education for Parents (2013). ISBN 978-1-61268-076-7.
- The Business of the 21st Century (2010), co-written with John Fleming and Kim Kiyosaki ISBN 81-8322-260-9.
- Second Chance: for Your Money, Your Life and Our World (2015) ISBN 978-1-61268-046-0
- 8 Lessons in Military Leadership for Entrepreneurs: How Military Values and Experience Can Shape Business and Life (2015) ISBN 978-1-4915-8387-6
- Why the Rich are Getting Richer: What is Financial Education...Really? (2017) ISBN 978-1-61268-088-0
- FAKE: Fake Money, Fake Teachers, Fake Assets: How Lies Are Making the Poor and Middle Class Poorer (2019) ISBN 978-1-61268-084-2
- Who Stole My Pension?: How You Can Stop The Looting (2020) ISBN 978-1-61268-103-0
- Capitalist Manifesto (2021) ISBN 978-161268-114-6
