= Bibliography of Donald Trump =

This bibliography of Donald Trump is a list of written and published works, by and about Donald Trump, the 45th and 47th president of the United States. Due to the sheer volume of books about Trump, the titles listed here are limited to non-fiction books about Trump or his presidency, published by notable authors and scholars. Tertiary sources (including textbooks and juvenile literature), satire, and self-published books are excluded.

Prior to his 2016 presidential campaign, Trump was widely known by the American public and media establishment, and was already the focus of many books describing his life as a businessman, media personality, and politician. Biographer Michael D'Antonio observed in Never Enough: Donald Trump and the Pursuit of Success (2015) that Trump "has been a topic of conversation in America for almost 40 years. No one in the world of business – not Bill Gates, Steve Jobs or Warren Buffett – has been as famous as Trump for as long." Almost one year after his inauguration as president, The Guardian noted that more than 4,500 English-language books about Trump had been published since he took office, compared to just over 800 works about Trump's predecessor Barack Obama during his first year in office. This "Trump bump" for the U.S. publishing industry, as The New York Times put it, persisted throughout his time in office. But afterwards, demand for books about his presidency dropped off sharply.

Trump's first published book in 1987 was Trump: The Art of the Deal, written by ghostwriter Tony Schwartz. Trump made a practice of hiring ghostwriters and co-authors to write his books. In some cases the ghostwriters are credited on the cover, while in other instances, including Time to Get Tough (2011) and Crippled America (2015), Trump makes mention of the writer's contributions in the acknowledgements sections. Works written by Trump himself include self-help books, personal finance books, political policy treatises, and autobiographies. "...Schwartz has noted that, during the year and a half that they worked together on The Art of the Deal, he never saw a single book in Trump's office or apartment. Yet Trump has taken authorial credits on more than a dozen books to date, and, given that he's a proven marketing master, it's inconceivable that he won't try to sell more."

The Washington Post journalist Carlos Lozada observed that a continuous theme throughout Trump's written works is a focus on Trump himself, such as citing examples from his business in real estate investing and work on television. Parties and individuals discussed in books by Trump are reduced to a zero-sum game, according to Lozada: "Trump's world is binary, divided into class acts and total losers." Trump often makes use of hyperbole to illustrate his points in his works. In other books, Trump repeats the same stories of what he views as key successes from his business career; for example, a tale about a 1980s business deal improving the Wollman Rink in Central Park, New York. Trump's published writings shifted post-2000, from generally memoirs about himself to books giving advice about finance.

== Credited to Trump ==
Title	Year	Publisher	ISBN / OCLC	Ghostwriter(s)	Notes
Trump: The Art of the Deal	1987	Random House	978-0-345-47917-4	Tony Schwartz	It reached number 1 on The New York Times Best Seller list, stayed there for 13 weeks, and altogether held a position on the list for 48 weeks. Schwartz discussed his ghostwriting in a 2016 article in The New Yorker.
Trump: Surviving at the Top	1990	Random House	978-0-394-57597-1	Charles Leerhsen	Subsequently, as: The Art of Survival (1991), ISBN 978-0-446-36209-2
Trump: The Art of the Comeback	1997	Times Books	978-0-8129-2964-5	Kate Bohner	
The America We Deserve	2000	Renaissance Books	978-1-580-63131-0	Dave Shiflett	Published during decision-making process for the Donald Trump presidential campaign, 2000.
Trump: How to Get Rich	2004	Random House	978-0-345-48103-0	Meredith McIver	
The Way to the Top: The Best Business Advice I Ever Received	2004	Crown Business	978-1-4000-5016-1		
Think Like a Billionaire: Everything You Need to Know About Success, Real Estate, and Life	2004	Random House	978-0-345-48140-5	Meredith McIver	
The Best Golf Advice I Ever Received	2005	Crown	978-0-307-20999-3		
Why We Want You to Be Rich	2006	Rich Press	978-1-933914-02-2	Meredith McIver	Robert Kiyosaki as coauthor. Debuted at number one on The New York Times best seller list
How to Build a Fortune: Your Plan for Success From the World's Most Famous Businessman	2006	Trump University	OCLC 67616909		Audiobook
The Best Real Estate Advice I Ever Received: 100 Top Experts Share Their Strategies	2006	Thomas Nelson	978-1-4016-0255-0		
Trump 101: The Way to Success	2006	Wiley	978-0-470-04710-1	Meredith McIver	The Washington Post, Politico, and CNN called the work a "Trump University book".
Think Big and Kick Ass	2007	HarperCollins	978-0-06-154783-6	Bill Zanker	Trump and Zanker had prior business dealings through Zanker's company The Learning Annex.
Never Give Up: How I Turned My Biggest Challenges into Success	2008	Wiley	978-0-470-19084-5	Meredith McIver	
Think Like a Champion: An Informal Education in Business and Life	2009	Vanguard Press	978-0-7624-3856-3	Meredith McIver	
Time to Get Tough: Making America #1 Again	2011	Regnery	978-1-59698-773-9	Wynton Hall; Peter Schweizer; Meredith McIver	On the Issues noted changes in political views compared with prior book The America We Deserve.
Midas Touch: Why Some Entrepreneurs Get Rich – And Why Most Don't	2011	Plata Publishing	978-1-61268-095-8		Second collaboration with co-author Robert Kiyosaki after Why We Want You to Be Rich
Trump Tower	2011	Vanguard Press	978-1-59315-643-5	Jeffrey Robinson	The book was billed as Trump's "debut novel", and later released with Jeffrey Robinson credited as the sole author.
Crippled America: How to Make America Great Again	2015	Threshold Editions	978-1-5011-3796-9	David Fisher	
Our Journey Together	2021	Winning Team Publishing	978-1-735-50372-1		
Letters to Trump	2023	Winning Team Publishing	978-1-735-50375-2		
Save America	2024	Winning Team Publishing	979-8-990-29062-4		Published on September 3, 2024.

== About Trump ==
Author	Title	Publisher	Year	ISBN / ASIN	Notes
Jerome Tuccille	Trump: The Saga of America's Most Powerful Real Estate Baron	Penguin	1985	978-1-55611-069-6	
John O'Donnell and James Rutherford	Trumped!: The Inside Story of the Real Donald Trump – His Cunning Rise and Spectacular Fall	Simon & Schuster	1991	978-0-671-73735-1	Trump called the author O'Donnell "a fucking loser".
John Connolly	How to Fool All of the People, All of the Time	Spy	1991	ASIN B01ICCQITE (Kindle)	The e-book was published in July 2016
Wayne Barrett	Trump: The Deals and the Downfall	HarperCollins	1992	978-0-06-016704-2	
Harry Hurt III	Lost Tycoon: The Many Lives of Donald J. Trump	Norton	1993	978-0-393-03029-7	
Gwenda Blair	The Trumps: Three Generations That Built an Empire	Simon & Schuster	2000	0-684-80849-8	
Robert Slater	No Such Thing as Over-exposure: Inside the Life and Celebrity of Donald Trump	Prentice Hall	2005	978-0-13-149734-4	Kirkus Reviews called it a "toadying portrait of a colorful figure, already larger than life, likely to sell in record numbers to fans. To impartial readers, it'll be shallow ephemera." Publishers Weekly called it "a paradoxical warts-and-all hagiography". Library Journal calls it a "fully authorized biography" and "it's hard to understand why Slater is so smitten with his subject". Booklist says "[Trump] himself is not so easily understood, but this book helps."
Timothy L. O'Brien	TrumpNation: The Art of Being the Donald	Warner Books	2005	978-0-446-57854-7	Trump sued the author for libel and the case was dismissed, Trump then appealed, and the dismissal was affirmed.
Gwenda Blair	Donald Trump: The Candidate	Simon & Schuster	2007	978-1-4165-4654-2	
George H. Ross	Trump-Style Negotiation: Powerful Strategies and Tactics for Mastering Every Deal	John Wiley & Sons	2008	978-0-470-22529-5	
David Ewen	Chasing Paradise: Donald Trump and the Battle for the World's Greatest Golf Course	Black & White	2010	978-1-84502-311-9	
Richard Bronson	The War at the Shore: Donald Trump, Steve Wynn, and the Epic Battle to Save Atlantic City	Overlook Press	2012	978-1-4683-0046-8	
Kevin D. Williamson	The Case Against Trump	Encounter Books	2015	978-1-59403-877-8	
Michael D'Antonio	Never Enough: Donald Trump and the Pursuit of Success	Thomas Dunne Books	2015	978-1-250-04238-5	Subsequently, as: The Truth About Trump. St. Martin's Press, 2016. ISBN 978-1-250-10528-8.
Michael Kranish and Marc Fisher	Trump Revealed: An American Journey of Ambition, Ego, Money, and Power	Scribner	2016	978-1-5011-5577-2	Trump urged his Twitter followers not to buy the biography.
Time editors	Donald Trump: The Rise of a Rule Breaker	Time	2016	978-1-68330-416-6	
Anastasia Catris	Where's Trump? Find Donald Trump in his race to the White House	Orion	2016	978-1-4091-6773-0	
David Cay Johnston	The Making of Donald Trump	Melville House	2016	978-1-61219-632-9	The author researched Trump for 30 years prior to writing the biography.
Ann Coulter	In Trump We Trust: E Pluribus Awesome!	Sentinel	2016	978-0-7352-1446-0	The e-book was a New York Times bestseller in September 2016.
Jackson Katz	Man Enough? Donald Trump, Hillary Clinton, and the Politics of Presidential Masculinity	Interlink	2016	978-1-56656-083-2	
Seth Milstein	The Little Book of Trumpisms	Portico	2016	978-1-911042-38-9	
Ted Rall	Trump: A Graphic Biography	Seven Stories Press	2016	978-1-60980-758-0	
Alan Whiticker	Trumped: The Wonderful World and Wisdom of Donald Trump	New Holland	2016	978-1-74257-896-5	
Jeffrey Lord	What America Needs: The Case for Trump	Regnery	2016	978-1-62157-523-8	
Wayne Barrett	Trump: The Greatest Show on Earth: The Deals, the Downfall, the Reinvention	Simon and Schuster	2016	978-1-942872-97-9	
Katy Tur	Unbelievable: My Front-Row Seat to the Craziest Campaign in American History	Dey Street Books	2017	978-0-06-268492-9	
Ivana Trump	Raising Trump: Family Values from America's First Mother	Gallery Books	2017	978-1-5011-7728-6	
Jon Sopel	If Only They Didn't Speak English	BBC Books	2017	978-1-78594-226-6	
Roger Stone	The Making of the President 2016: How Donald Trump Orchestrated a Revolution	Skyhorse	2017	978-1-5107-2692-5	
Joshua Green	Devil's Bargain	Penguin	2017	978-0-7352-2502-2	
Matt Taibbi	Insane Clown President: Dispatches from the 2016 Circus	Spiegel & Grau	2017	978-0-399-59246-1	Book was both on The New York Times Best Seller list and the Los Angeles Times Best Seller list
Newt Gingrich	Understanding Trump	Center Street	2017	978-1-4789-2308-4	The book topped The New York Times' Hardcover Non-Fiction Best Sellers list on July 2.
David Horowitz	Big Agenda: President Trump's Plan to Save America	Humanix Books	2017	978-1-63006-087-9	
Scott Adams	Win Bigly	Portfolio	2017	978-0-7352-1971-7	
Bandy X. Lee	The Dangerous Case of Donald Trump	Thomas Dunne Books	2017	978-1-250-17945-6	
Corey Lewandowski and David Bossie	Let Trump Be Trump: The Inside Story of His Rise to the Presidency	Center Street	2017	978-1-5460-8330-6	
Allan Lichtman	The Case for Impeachment	Dey Street Books	2017	978-0-06-269682-3	
Malcolm Nance	The Plot to Hack America: How Putin's Cyberspies and WikiLeaks Tried to Steal the 2016 Election	Skyhorse	2016	978-1-5107-2332-0	The Wall Street Journal Best Seller in nonfiction ebooks
Stephen Mansfield	Choosing Donald Trump: God, Anger, Hope, and Why Christian Conservatives Supported Him	Baker Books	2017	978-0-8010-0733-0	
Keith Olbermann	Trump is F*cking Crazy (This is Not a Joke)	Blue Rider Press	2017	978-0-525-53386-3	
Caitríona Perry	In America: Tales from Trump Country	Gill	2017	978-0-7171-7953-4	
Nathan J. Robinson	Trump: Anatomy of a Monstrosity	Demilune Press	2017	978-0-9978447-7-1	
Michael Savage	Trump's War: His Battle for America	Center Street	2017	978-1-4789-7667-7	
Laura Ingraham	Billionaire at the Barricades	St. Martin's Press	2017	978-1-2501-5064-6	
Phyllis Schlafly; posthumously, with Ed Martin and Brett M. Decker	The Conservative Case for Trump	Regnery	2016	978-1-62157-628-0	
Andrew Shaffer	The Day of the Donald: Trump Trumps America!	Crooked Lane Books	2016	978-1-68331-045-7	
Hart Seely	Bard of the Deal: The Poetry of Donald Trump	HarperCollins	2015	978-0-06-246516-0	
Rob Sears	The Beautiful Poetry of Donald Trump	Canongate Books	2017	978-1-78689-227-0	
Marc Shapiro	Trump This! The Life and Times of Donald Trump, An Unauthorized Biography	Riverdale Avenue Books	2016	978-1-62601-264-6	
Dan Bongino, D.C. McAllister, and Matt Palumbo	Spygate: The Attempted Sabotage of Donald J. Trump	Post Hill Press	2018	978-1-64293-098-6	
Hal Brands	American Grand Strategy in the Age of Trump	Brookings Institution	2018	978-0-8157-3278-5	
David Brody	The Faith of Donald J. Trump	Broadside Books	2018	978-0-06-274959-8	
Craig Unger	House of Trump, House of Putin: The Untold Story of Donald Trump and the Russian Mafia	Dutton	2018	978-1-524-74350-5	
Seth Hettena	Trump/Russia: A Definitive History	Melville House	2018	978-1-61219-739-5	
Bob Woodward	Fear: Trump in the White House	Simon & Schuster	2018	978-1-5011-7551-0	
Michael Wolff	Fire and Fury: Inside the Trump White House	Henry Holt and Company	2018	978-1-250-15806-2	
Anthony Scaramucci	Trump: The Blue-Collar President	Center Street, Hachette Book Group	2018	978-1-5460-7640-7	
Alan Dershowitz	The Case Against Impeaching Trump	Hot Books	2018	978-1-5107-4228-4	
David Frum	Trumpocracy: The Corruption of the American Republic	Harper	2018	978-0-06-279673-8	
Newt Gingrich	Trump's America: The Truth about Our Nation's Great Comeback	Center Street	2018	978-1-5460-7706-0	
Luke Harding	Collusion: Secret Meetings, Dirty Money, and How Russia Helped Donald Trump Win	Vintage	2018	978-0-525-56251-1	
David Cay Johnston	It's Even Worse Than You Think: What the Trump Administration Is Doing to America	Simon & Schuster	2018	978-1-5011-7416-2	
John L. Campbell	American Discontent: The Rise of Donald Trump and Decline of the Golden Age	Oxford University Press	2018	978-0-19-087243-4	
Howard Kurtz	Media Madness: Donald Trump, the Press, and the War Over the Truth	Regnery	2018	978-1-62157-726-3	
Michael Lewis	The Fifth Risk: Undoing Democracy	W.W. Norton & Company	2018	978-0-393-35745-5	
Omarosa Manigault Newman	Unhinged	Gallery Publishing Group	2018	978-1-9821-0970-7	Trump reacted by referring to Manigault Newman as a "lowlife" and "that dog".
Michael Nelson	Trump's First Year	University of Virginia Press	2018	978-0-8139-4144-8	
Anonymous (Miles Taylor)	A Warning	Twelve Books	2019	978-1-5387-1846-9	Written by the anonymous Trump White House official who wrote "I Am Part of the Resistance Inside the Trump Administration" in September 2018.
James D. Zirin	Plaintiff in Chief: A Portrait of Donald Trump in 3,500 Lawsuits	St. Martin's Publishsing Group	2019	978-1-250-20162-1	
Victor Davis Hanson	The Case for Trump	Basic Books	2019	978-1-5416-7354-0	
Neil Katyal and Sam Koppelman	Impeach: The Case Against Donald Trump		2019	978-0-358-39117-3	
James Poniewozik	Audience of One: Donald Trump, Television, and the Fracturing of America	Liveright	2019	978-1-63149-442-0	
Steven Hassan	The Cult of Trump: A Leading Cult Expert Explains How the President Uses Mind Control	Simon & Schuster	2019	978-1982127343	
Rick Reilly	Commander in Cheat: How Golf Explains Trump	Hachette Books	2019	978-0-316-52808-5	
Michael Wolff	Siege: Trump Under Fire	Henry Holt and Company	2019	978-1-250-25382-8	
Bill O'Reilly	The United States of Trump: How the President Really Sees America	Henry Holt and Company	2019	978-1-250-23722-4	
Jim Acosta	The Enemy of the People: A Dangerous Time to Tell the Truth in America	Harper	2019	978-0-06-291612-9	
Peter Bergen	Trump and His Generals: The Cost of Chaos	Penguin Random House	2019	978-0-525-52241-6	
Doug Wead	Inside Trump's White House: The Real Story Of His Presidency	Center Street	2019	978-1-5460-8585-0	
Roderick P. Hart	Trump and Us: What He Says And Why People Listen	Cambridge University Press	2020	978-1-108-49081-8	
Jonathan Karl	Front Row at the Trump Show	Dutton	2020	978-1-5247-4562-2	
Sarah Kendzior	Hiding in Plain Sight: The Invention of Donald Trump and the Erosion of America	Flatiron Books	2020	978-1-250-21071-5	
Philip Rucker and Carol Leonnig	A Very Stable Genius: Donald J. Trump's Testing of America	Penguin (US); Bloomsbury (UK)	2020	978-1-9848-7749-9	Details the first three years of the Trump presidency.
Michael Jolls	Make Hollywood Great Again: Cinema in the Era of President Trump	Kindle Direct Publishing	2020	979-8-6343-7715-5	
Jeffrey Toobin	True Crimes and Misdemeanors: The Investigation of Donald Trump	Doubleday	2020	978-0-385-53673-8	
Michael Cohen	Disloyal, A Memoir: The True Story Of The Former Personal Attorney To President Donald J. Trump	Skyhorse	2020	978-1-5107-6469-9	
Norman Eisen	A Case for the American People: The United States v. Donald J. Trump	Crown	2020	978-0-593-23843-1	
Michael S. Schmidt	Donald Trump v. The United States	Penguin Random House	2020	978-1-9848-5466-7	Sep. 2020 release
Richard Ryan	The Last Presidential Election: How Donald Trump has Subverted our Institutions, Undermined our Constitution, and Threatened the future of our Democracy	Goldflex Pubs with Lulu	2020	978-1-71683-121-8	
John Bolton	The Room Where It Happened: A White House Memoir	Simon & Schuster	2020	978-1-9821-4803-4	The Trump administration unsuccessfully sought to block release of the book; a US federal judge denied this request.
Peter Strzok	Compromised: Counterintelligence and the Threat of Donald J. Trump	Houghton Mifflin Harcourt	2020	978-0-358-23706-8	Excerpted on CBS News website
Mary L. Trump	Too Much and Never Enough: How My Family Created the World's Most Dangerous Man	Simon & Schuster	2020	978-1-5011-7728-6	
Barbara Res	Tower of Lies: What My Eighteen Years of Working with Donald Trump Reveals about Him	Graymalkin Media	2020	978-1-63168-304-6	
Lawrence Douglas	Will He Go?: Trump and the Looming Election Meltdown in 2020	Twelve Books	2020	978-1-5387-5188-6	
Daniel W. Drezner	The Toddler in Chief: What Donald Trump Teaches Us About the Modern Presidency	University of Chicago Press	2020	978-0-226-71425-7	
Michael D'Antonio	High Crimes: The Corruption, Impunity, and Impeachment of Donald Trump	Thomas Dunne Books	2020	978-1-250-76667-0	
Bob Woodward	Rage	Simon & Schuster	2020	978-1-9821-3173-9	Sep. 15 hardcover release
Stephanie Winston Wolkoff	Melania and Me: The Rise and Fall of My Friendship with the First Lady	Gallery Books	2020	978-1-9821-5124-9	
Dan P McAdams	The Strange Case of Donald J. Trump: A Psychological Reckoning	Oxford University Press	2020	978-0-19-750747-6	McAdams is the Henry Wade Rogers Professor of Psychology, and Professor of Education and Social Policy at Northwestern University.
Jennifer Mercieca	Demagogue for President: The Rhetorical Genius of Donald Trump	Texas A&M University Press	2020	978-1-62349-906-8	
Dan Alexander	White House, Inc.: How Donald Trump Turned the Presidency Into a Business	Portfolio/Penguin	2020	978-0-593-18852-1	
Bandy X. Lee	Profile of a Nation: Trump's Mind, America's Soul	World Mental Health Coalition, Inc.	2020	978-1-7355537-4-0	
David Enrich	Dark Towers: Deutsche Bank, Donald Trump, and an Epic Trail of Destruction	Custom House	2021	978-0-06-287883-0	
Yasmeen Abutaleb and Damian Paletta	Nightmare Scenario: Inside the Trump Administration's Response to the Pandemic That Changed History	HarperCollins	2021	978-0-06-306607-6	
Michael C. Bender	Frankly, We Did Win This Election: The Inside Story of How Trump Lost	Grand Central Publishing	2021	978-1-5387-3480-3	
Michael Wolff	Landslide: The Final Days of the Trump Presidency	Henry Holt and Co.	2021	978-1-250-83001-2	
Carol Leonnig and Philip Rucker	I Alone Can Fix It: Donald J. Trump's Catastrophic Final Year	Penguin Press	2021	978-0-593-29894-7	
Mary L. Trump	The Reckoning: Our Nation's Trauma and Finding a Way to Heal	St. Martin's Publishing Group	2021	978-1-250278-45-6	
Bob Woodward and Robert Costa	Peril	Simon & Schuster	2021	978-1-982182-91-5	
Maggie Haberman	Confidence Man: The Making of Donald Trump and the Breaking of America	Penguin Press	2022	978-0-593-29734-6	
Martin Baron	Collision of Power: Trump, Bezos, and The Washington Post	Flatiron Books	2023	978-1-250-84420-0	
H. R. McMaster	At War with Ourselves: My Tour of Duty in the Trump White House	Harper	2024	978-0-062-89950-7	
Fred Trump III	All in the Family: The Trumps and How We Got This Way	Gallery Books	2024	978-1-668-07217-2	
Russ Buettner and Susanne Craig	Lucky Loser: How Donald Trump Squandered His Father's Fortune and Created the Illusion of Success	Penguin Press	2024	978-0-593-29864-0	OCLC 1423685554
Maggie Haberman and Jonathan Swan	Regime Change: Inside the Imperial Presidency of Donald Trump	Simon & Schuster	2026	978-1668067246	OCLC 1583409734
Susan Neiman	Call It Evil: Understanding the Trump Era	W. W. Norton & Company	2026	978-1324131045	

== About the books about Trump ==
Author	Title	Publisher	Year	ISBN	Notes
Carlos Lozada	What Were We Thinking: A Brief Intellectual History of the Trump Era	Simon & Schuster	2020	978-1-9821-4562-0	
