= Abutaleb =

Abutaleb is both a surname and a given name. Notable people with the name include:

- Ahmed Aboutaleb (born 1961), Morocco-born Dutch politician and journalist
- Aboutaleb Talebi (1945–2008), Iranian Olympic wrestler
- Yasmeen Abutaleb, American writer and journalist
