= Joseph Petro =

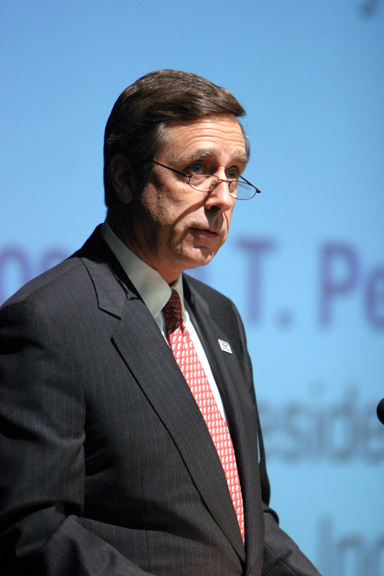
Joseph Petro

Joseph Petro (born 1944) is the executive vice president and managing director of Citigroup Security and Investigative Services. He is also co-chairman of the United States Department of State's Overseas Security Advisory Council. He also served for 23 years as a special agent in the United States Secret Service; eleven of them with presidents and vice presidents.

== Biography ==
Following his career as a United States Navy lieutenant, during which he patrolled the rivers and canals along the Vietnamese-Cambodian border, he worked his way up through the Secret Service to become one of the key men in charge of protecting the president.

In 1993, Petro joined Travelers Group, Citigroup’s legacy company, as director of corporate security.

From 1971 to 1993, Petro was a special agent and senior executive with the United States Secret Service, where he served in numerous operational and management positions. He supervised the presidential and vice presidential protective divisions and the Washington Field Office. Earlier in his career, Petro had been assigned to investigations, intelligence, training, internal affairs and public affairs. He also was selected as special assistant to the Secretary of the Treasury, where he advised and assisted department officials on financial crime enforcement policy and worked with the Justice Department, Congressional committees and other federal agencies on law enforcement issues. Prior to his career in the Secret Service, Petro was a lieutenant in the U.S. Navy's River Patrol Forces.

He is member of the board of directors of the International Security Management Association (ISMA) and vice-chairman and member of the board of the New York City Law Enforcement Explorers Council.

Petro is a graduate of Temple University and was a Fellow at Princeton University's Woodrow Wilson School of Public and International Affairs.

Petro is the author of Standing Next to History: An Agent's Life Inside the Secret Service with Jeffrey Robinson.
