= Trump: How to Get Rich =

2004 book by Donald Trump and Meredith McIver

- Standard paperback cover
- Author: Donald Trump; Meredith McIver
- Language: English
- Subject: Wealth
- Genre: Non-fiction
- Publisher: Random House, 2004
- Media type: Print
- Pages: 272
- ISBN: 978-0345481030
- OCLC: 971424989
- Preceded by: The America We Deserve
- Followed by: The Way to the Top

Trump: How to Get Rich is a 2004 non-fiction book by Donald Trump and Meredith McIver. Like Trump's 16 other publications, it was to an unknown extent ghostwritten by McIver. The book was published to take advantage of media attention related to The Apprentice TV series, which Trump hosted from January 2004 to February 2015. The book is focused on Trump's fame and public image, and makes statements such as "Emphatically and categorically, no: I do not wear a rug. My hair is 100 per cent mine." While the book forms part of Trump's success creed, it more describes how Trump got richer than being a "how to get rich" guide. The book contains 53 short business "commandments" and finishes with a section dedicated to Trump's role in The Apprentice.

== See also ==
- Bibliography of Donald Trump
