= The Beautiful Poetry of Donald Trump =

Poetry collection

- First edition cover
- Author: Robert Sears
- Language: English
- Genre: Satire
- Published: August 31, 2017
- Publisher: Canongate Books
- Publication place: United States
- Media type: Hardcover, audio, e-book
- Pages: 144
- ISBN: 978-1786892270

The Beautiful Poetry of Donald Trump is a 2017 satirical poetry collection written by Robert Sears and published by Canongate Books.

== Contents ==
Written to resemble a poetry collection, the book contains old tweets and quotes attributed to Donald Trump which were compiled by the Trump Twitter Archive, the Trump Archive, and the American Presidency Project. There are seventeen "poems" in the book.

== Reception ==
Writing for The Washington Post, Ron Charles cited The Beautiful Poetry of Donald Trump as a "curious response" to Trump's presidency. In June 2020, Joshua Tresvalles of the International Business Times listed the book as one of the "Top 10 Best Books About Donald Trump in 2020".

== See also ==
- Bibliography of Donald Trump
