= The Way to the Top =

2004 book by Donald Trump

The Way to the Top: The Best Business Advice I Ever Received
- Author: Donald Trump
- Language: English
- Publisher: Crown Business
- Publication date: 2004
- Publication place: United States
- Pages: 253
- ISBN: 9781400050161
- OCLC: 54692354
- Preceded by: Trump: How to Get Rich
- Followed by: Think Like a Billionaire: Everything You Need to Know About Success, Real Estate, and Life

The Way to the Top: The Best Business Advice I Ever Received is a business book compiled by Donald Trump.

First released in May 2004, the book reached The Wall Street Journal list of Best Selling Books the month it was published.

Publishers Weekly recommended the book for fans of The Apprentice. Staten Island Advance called it "easy-to-understand".

== Contents summary ==
The Way to the Top includes quotations from 100 businesspeople, including billionaire private equity investor Thomas J. Barrack and realtor Barbara Corcoran. One of the contributors, Steven Cody of Peppercom, a PR firm, was surprised to be asked by Trump to appear in the book. Entrepreneur Charlotte Ottley, owner of a communications business located in New York, served as a contributing author to the book. Dippin' Dots founder Curt Jones was quoted in the work.

== Sales and reception ==
The Way to the Top was first released on May 18, 2004. By May 28 of that year, it had reached number 10 on The Wall Street Journal "Best Selling Books" among business books. It remained a best seller on the list through July 2004.

Publishers Weekly reviewed the book, and wrote that it put together advice from multiple members of the business industry into "easily digestible tidbits". The review concluded, "Serious readers of business books may be disappointed by some of more lackluster contributions ... but there are enough sage words here to satisfy most fans of The Apprentice." Staten Island Advance wrote that the book featured, "a compilation of practical, easy-to-understand business advice gathered from top executives across the country." Detroit Examiner recommended the book among: "Top 5 business leadership book recommendations for 2010".

== See also ==
- Bibliography of Donald Trump
