= The America We Deserve =

2000 book by Donald Trump and Dave Shiflett

- Author: Donald Trump; Dave Shiflett
- Language: English
- Subject: Public policy
- Genre: Nonfiction
- Publisher: Renaissance Books
- Publication date: January 2000
- Publication place: United States
- Pages: 304
- ISBN: 978-1580631310
- OCLC: 1043235303
- Preceded by: Trump: The Art of the Comeback (1997)
- Followed by: Trump: How to Get Rich (2004)

The America We Deserve is a book about public policy ghostwritten by Dave Shiflett with Donald Trump. It was published in January 2000, while Trump campaigned for president in that year's election on the Reform Party's ticket. The book lists and details a set of policy proposals Trump intended to implement should he ever become president.

== Positions and proposals ==
In the book, Trump expresses anti-illegal-immigration views similar to those that he espoused when he ran for president successfully in 2016. For example, he wrote, "A liberal policy of immigration may seem to reflect confidence and generosity. But our current laxness toward illegal immigration shows a recklessness and disregard for those who live here legally."

Trump also endorsed some proposals he would abandon by his 2016 election run. For example, he proposed a 14.25% wealth tax on individuals and trusts valued at more than $10 million. The book also supports a universal health care system.

== Alleged prediction of terrorism ==
During his 2016 presidential campaign, Trump frequently cited the book on the campaign trail as proof that he predicted the September 11 attacks.

Fact-checkers disputed some of Trump's claims. Contrary to his claims in a 2015 interview with Alex Jones, the book only "makes a single reference to bin Laden":

One day we're told that a shadowy figure with no fixed address named Osama bin-Laden is public enemy number one, and U.S. jetfighters lay waste to his camp in Afghanistan. He escapes back under some rock, and a few news cycles later it's on to a new enemy and new crisis.

According to Eugene Kiely of FactCheck.org, the book "doesn't warn 'we better be careful with this guy named Osama bin Laden.' It doesn't say the U.S. 'better take him out.' And Trump's reference to bin Laden as someone 'nobody really knew' at the time is wrong, too."

According to Rebecca Kaplan of CBS News, Trump wrote that "we're in danger of the sort of terrorist attacks that will make the [1993] bombing of the Trade Center look like kids playing with firecrackers." Kaplan stated that "Trump was, in fact, right that there was a terror attack far greater in scale than the 1993 World Trade Center bombings, which killed six people and injured more than 1,000. The Sept. 11 attacks killed nearly 3,000. He was off-base about other aspects, though. Trump predicted the terror plot would be the result of the miniaturization of weapons like nuclear bombs or a canister of anthrax." Additionally, "[Trump] merely pointed [to] bin Laden as an illustration of haphazard foreign policy—not to predict that bin Laden would be responsible for the next attack against the U.S."

Jessica Riedl of the Manhattan Institute, regarding if Trump's statements were even factual, “the U.S. govt had been aware of Bin Laden for decades, and by the mid-1990s he was the CIA’s most wanted terrorist with several well-known attacks. They were actively pursuing him at the time. So Trump’s boast is like warning the world about Hitler in 1942.”

In 2025, during a celebration of the US Navy, Trump reiterated this false claim, attesting it as being as factual as the US Navy SEALs' killing of Osama bin Laden. Trump added the detail he had a conversation with his Secretary of Defence United States Secretary of Defense, Pete Hegseth, citing that Osama bin Laden should have been taken out in 2000 but that he (Pres. Trump) was ignored.

== Reception ==
In the February 2000 issue of The American Spectator, Shiflett wrote that the book "will appeal to the established Trump constituency, but also hopes to show the author as worthy of wider support."

== See also ==
- Bibliography of Donald Trump
