= Donald Trump 2000 presidential campaign =

American political campaign

Donald Trump for President
- Campaign: 2000 U.S. presidential election
- Candidate: Donald Trump; Chairman of The Trump Organization (1971–2017)
- Affiliation: Reform Party
- Announced: October 7, 1999
- Suspended: February 14, 2000
- Headquarters: Manhattan, New York City
- Key people: Roger Stone (director)

Website
- www.DonaldJTrump2000.com (defunct) (Note: The homepage of the now-defunct site can be seen at the 1:00 minute mark of the November 28, 1999 edition of C-SPAN's Washington Journal)

New York real estate magnate Donald Trump announced the creation of a presidential exploratory committee on the October 7, 1999, edition of Larry King Live on CNN. Although Trump had never held elected office, he was well known for his frequent comments on public affairs and business exploits as head of The Trump Organization. He had previously considered a presidential run in 1988 as a Republican, but chose not to run. For 2000, Minnesota Governor Jesse Ventura persuaded Trump to seek the presidential nomination of the Reform Party, which was fracturing despite achieving ballot access and qualifying for matching funds as a result of businessman Ross Perot's 1996 presidential campaign on the party's ticket.

Trump focused his campaign on the issues of international trade, eliminating the national debt, and achieving universal healthcare as outlined in the campaign companion piece The America We Deserve, released in January 2000. He named media proprietor Oprah Winfrey as his ideal running mate and said he would instantly marry his then-girlfriend, Melania Knauss (Melania Trump), to make her First Lady. Critics questioned the seriousness of Trump's campaign and speculated that it was a tactic to strengthen his brand and sell books. Trump defended his candidacy as a serious endeavor and proclaimed that he had a chance to win the election. Although he never expanded the campaign beyond the exploratory phase, Trump made numerous media appearances as a candidate, travelled to campaign events in Florida, California, and Minnesota, and qualified for two presidential primaries. Veteran campaign strategist and later longtime Trump aide Roger Stone was hired as director of the exploratory committee.

Internal conflict caused Ventura to exit the Reform Party in February 2000, removing Trump's most vocal proponent. Trump officially ended his campaign on the February 14, 2000 airing of The Today Show on NBC. Although he believed he could still win the Reform Party presidential nomination, he felt the party was too dysfunctional to support his campaign and enable a win in the general election. A poll matching Trump against likely Republican nominee George W. Bush and likely Democratic nominee Al Gore showed Trump with 7% support. Despite his withdrawal, Trump won both primaries for which he qualified. Paleoconservative commentator Pat Buchanan would go on to win the nomination of the Reform Party, receiving 0.4% of the vote.

After the election, Trump gained greater fame as the host of The Apprentice on NBC. He also notably considered running as a Republican in the 2012 presidential election against incumbent Barack Obama, but instead endorsed and supported eventual nominee Mitt Romney. Four years later, he initiated a full-scale presidential campaign, became the Republican Party's 2016 presidential nominee and was elected as the 45th president of the United States. Following his loss to Joe Biden in the 2020 presidential election, Trump initiated another full-scale presidential campaign, became the Republican Party's 2024 presidential nominee and was elected as the 47th president of the United States.

== Background ==
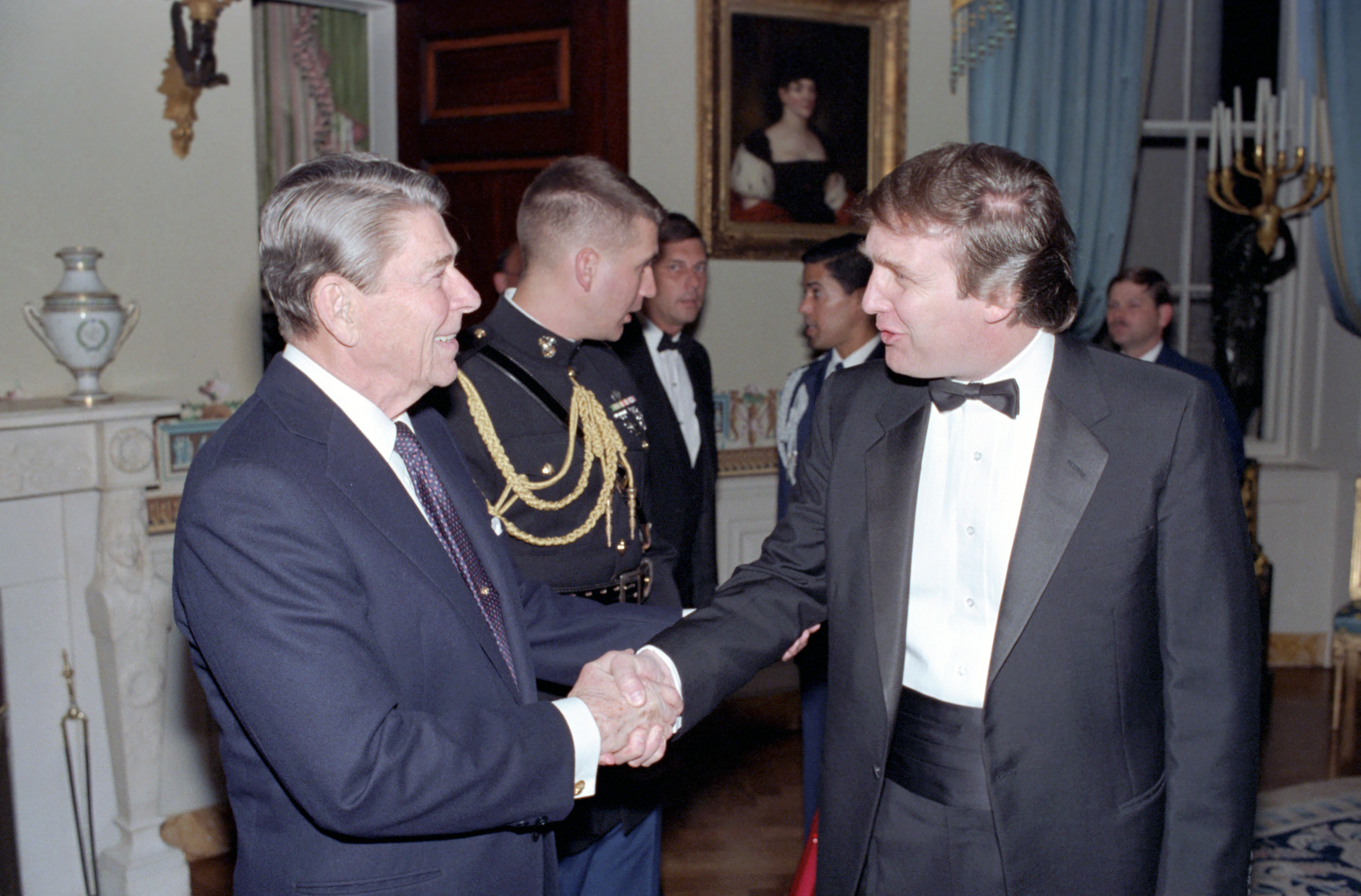
Donald Trump with President Ronald Reagan in 1987, when Trump first considered running for president.

Trump, head of The Trump Organization since 1971, first dabbled in presidential politics in the early summer of 1987. Republican political organizer Mike Dunbar, unimpressed with the candidates for the 1988 Republican presidential nomination, founded the "Draft Trump for President" organization. Believing Trump had the makings of a president, Dunbar pitched Trump the idea of speaking at an event for Republican candidates in the first-in-the-nation primary state of New Hampshire. According to Dunbar in a later interview, Trump was receptive to this idea. Then a registered Democrat, Trump officially changed his registration to Republican in July 1987. Speculation that he would actually run for president intensified when he purchased $94,801 (~$230,142 in 2025) worth of full-page advertisements in The New York Times, The Boston Globe, and The Washington Post with the heading "There's nothing wrong with America's Foreign Defense Policy that a little backbone can't cure." The advertisements reflected Trump's concerns that Japan, Saudi Arabia, and Kuwait were taking advantage of American money and protection without providing any benefit to the United States. The next month, as Dunbar had proposed, Trump appeared at a Rotary Club luncheon in New Hampshire. There, he delivered what The New York Times described as an "impassioned speech," in which he expressed concern about the U.S. being "pushed around" by its allies and proposed that "these countries that are ripping us off pay off the $200 billion deficit." In the audience, college students held placards reading "Trump for President." Nevertheless, Trump proclaimed, "I'm not here because I'm running for President. I'm here because I'm tired of our country being kicked around and I want to get my ideas across." Later, Trump appeared on The Phil Donahue Show on WNBC. After the appearance, he received a letter from former President Richard Nixon in which Nixon explained that his wife Pat, "an expert on politics," had seen Trump on the show and "predicts that whenever you decide to run for office you will be a winner!" In November 1987, Trump released The Art of the Deal, which became a New York Times bestseller.

Months later, during an April 1988 appearance on The Oprah Winfrey Show on ABC, Trump discussed his displeasure with the U.S.'s status as a "debtor nation" and its seeming inability to compete with Japan. Winfrey asked Trump if he would ever run for president. He replied, "Probably not, but I do get tired of seeing the country get ripped off ... I just don't think I have the inclination to do it." Furthermore, he asserted that if he ever did run, he would win the election. He later appeared at the 1988 Republican National Convention. In an interview on the floor, NBC News reporter Chris Wallace asked whether Trump's visit to his first national convention would induce him to "take the plunge" into a presidential campaign. In response, Trump downplayed his prior exploration into presidential politics, though repeated that he would win if he ever ran, and praised then-presumptive Republican presidential nominee George H. W. Bush. During another convention interview on Larry King Live, Trump said, "I doubt I'll ever be involved in politics beyond what I do right now." Talk of a potential Trump candidacy grew silent for much of the next decade.

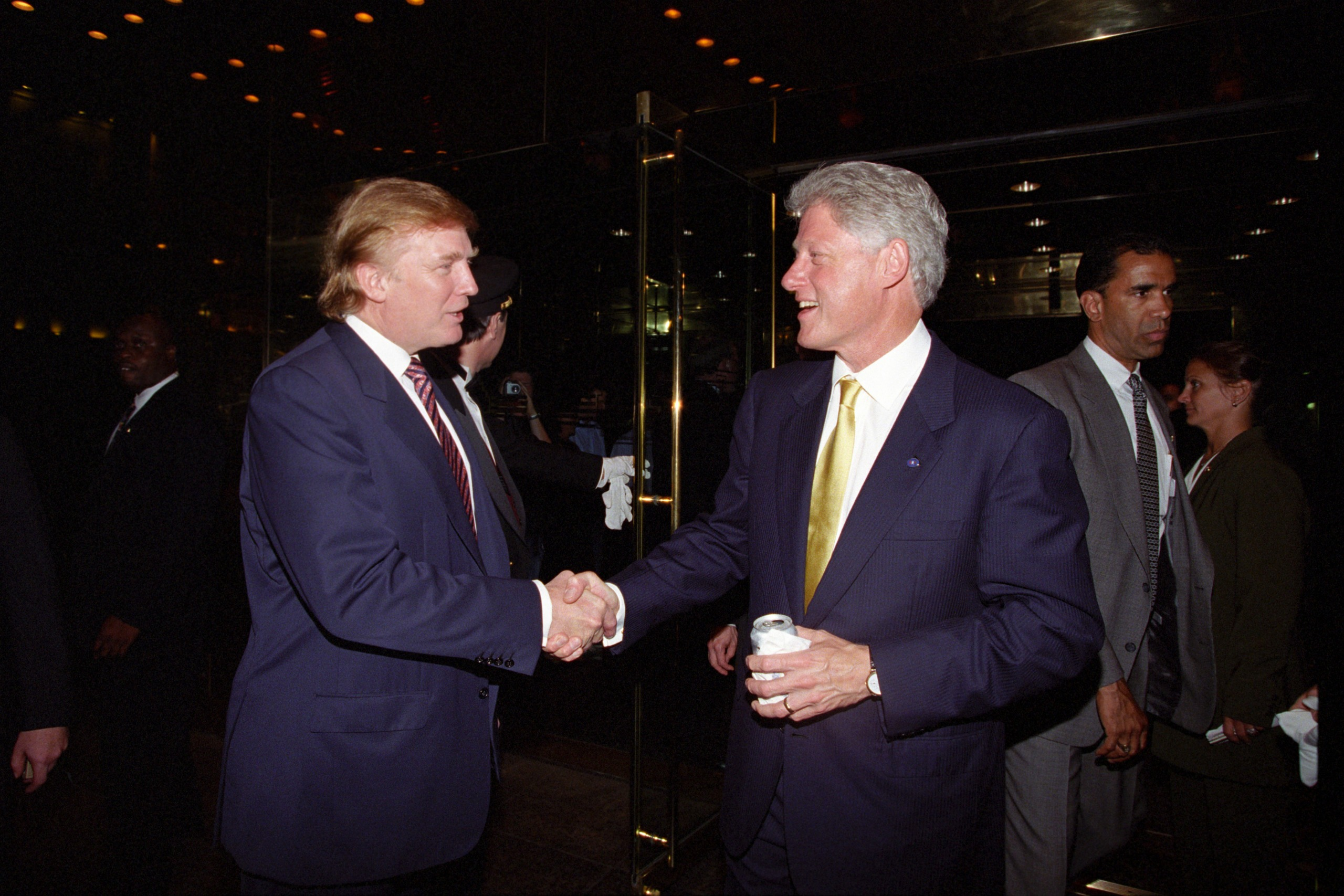
Trump with President Bill Clinton at Trump Tower in 2000

In 1995, industrialist Ross Perot, who had received 18.9 percent of the vote during his independent 1992 run for president, formed the Reform Party of the United States of America. Although Perot won the party's 1996 nomination and garnered 8.4 percent of the popular vote, rifts had begun forming within the party. Former Colorado Governor Richard Lamm, who unsuccessfully challenged Perot for the 1996 presidential nomination, accused Perot of using the party as a personal vehicle, and broke off with his supporters to form a new party. In 1998, former professional wrestler Jesse Ventura was elected Governor of Minnesota as a member of the Reform Party—the party's most significant victory—but Perot and his followers were not receptive to Ventura and his political allies. The Perot faction adamantly, though unsuccessfully, attempted to prevent the election of Ventura supporter Jack Gargan as party chairman in 1999 when Perot backer Russ Verney chose not to stand for re-election for his term ending January 1, 2000. Opting not to run for president himself in 2000, Ventura searched for candidates. Initially, he courted WWF Board Member and former Connecticut governor Lowell P. Weicker Jr. He then turned to Donald Trump.

== Early stages ==
In 1999, The New York Times reported that Jesse Ventura first approached Trump about a possible 2000 presidential run while both were in attendance at a wrestling event in Atlantic City. But Trump's ambitions may have formed earlier. The America We Deserve co-writer Dave Shiflett said Trump first thought about running in late 1998, when he looked at his political advantages in money and name recognition, and concluded that he was "at least as competent" as then President Bill Clinton. According to Shiflett, this prompted Trump to ask top aide Roger Stone to find the "most eminent hack writer in America" to put Trump's political ideas into a book. Stone reached out to Shiflett, a contributor to The American Spectator. In spring 1999, Shiflett met with Trump about the project that would later become The America We Deserve. During the initial meeting, Shiflett claims Trump raised concerns about a suitcase bomb destroying Manhattan.

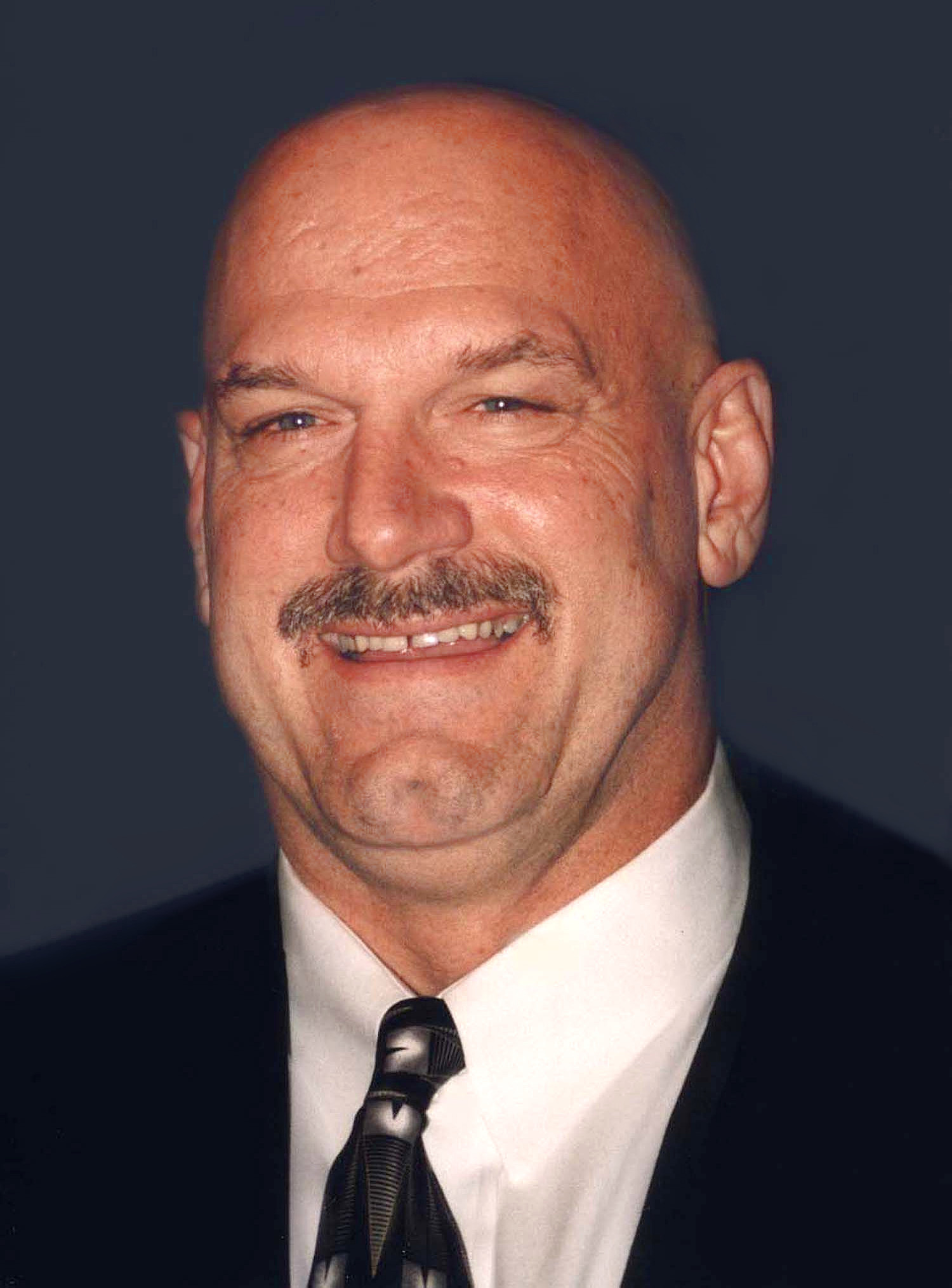
Minnesota Governor Jesse Ventura privately encouraged Trump to run.

In July 1999, the Democratic polling firm Schroth and Associates conducted a poll of 400 Reform Party leaders and found Trump tied for third place for the Reform Party presidential nomination. Both the Reform Party and Trump denied having commissioned the poll. Days later, Newsweek raised speculation when it cited an unnamed "close friend" of Trump who said Trump was "toying" with the idea of a presidential campaign, allegedly in response to rumors of Ventura's courting of Weicker for a run. Trump purportedly held a grudge against Weicker for blocking his plans to build a casino in Bridgeport in 1994. The two had an exchange of insults in which Weicker labeled Trump a "dirt bag" and Trump referred to Weicker as "a fat slob who couldn't get elected dog catcher." In response to the Newsweek report, Trump sent out a press release in which he criticized the two party system, praised the Reform Party, and stated "If the Reform Party nominated me, I would probably run and probably win." However, he added that if the party nominated him, he would ask for "an immediate recount." In an interview, he told The New York Times, "I'm honored and I'm flattered [by the speculation], but the fact is I've never had more fun than I'm having right now, building the most spectacular buildings in New York." Chairman Verney denied that the Reform Party had any interest in Trump, explaining that party members had "never spent one second thinking about him." A CNN-Time poll conducted later in July showed Trump with seven percent support nationally in a match up against Republican candidate George W. Bush and Vice President Al Gore.

Two months later, amid reports that paleoconservative political commentator and adviser Pat Buchanan was about to join the Reform Party to seek the nomination, Trump announced that he would consider running as a sign of respect for Ventura. He labeled the views of Buchanan as "prehistoric", and commented that even though he liked Pat, "I'm on the conservative side, but Buchanan is Attila the Hun." He expected that a primary battle between the two would be "nasty." According to columnist Robert Novak, Bush operatives concerned about a third party run by Buchanan contacted Ventura indirectly about preventing Buchanan's nomination. Novak argued that Trump "seems a bad match with Perot's party, but he may be the GOP's last hope to stop Buchanan." When Weicker decided not to seek the party's nomination due to internal bickering, Ventura reportedly went all in for Trump. The media capitalized on a potential Trump versus Buchanan challenge, and Saturday Night Live satirized it with a skit in which Darrell Hammond portraying Trump and Chris Parnell as Buchanan pitched their candidacies to Ross Perot, played by Cheri Oteri. The segment also featured an appearance by Will Ferrell as Ventura.

Trump further increased speculation of a full-scale campaign when his publisher Renaissance Books announced a January 2000 release date for The America We Deserve. The publisher's press release announced a book tour and teased, "Donald Trump for President? Run or not, Donald Trump's ideas will have a major impact on the next presidential election." Trump set January also as the month on which he would decide whether to run. He expressed, "I'm not interested in being the [third-party] candidate who gets the most votes in the history of the world outside of the Democratic and Republican parties, I would only consider this if I thought I could win." On September 30, Trump wrote an opinion piece in The Wall Street Journal titled, "America Needs a President Like Me" in which he argued that he would be "the kind of president America needs in the new millennium." He cited the "repugnant" comments of Buchanan and Ventura's personal encouragement as factors contributing to his decision. In an October 6 interview on Dateline NBC, Trump affirmed that he was "very serious" about his run.

== Announcement ==
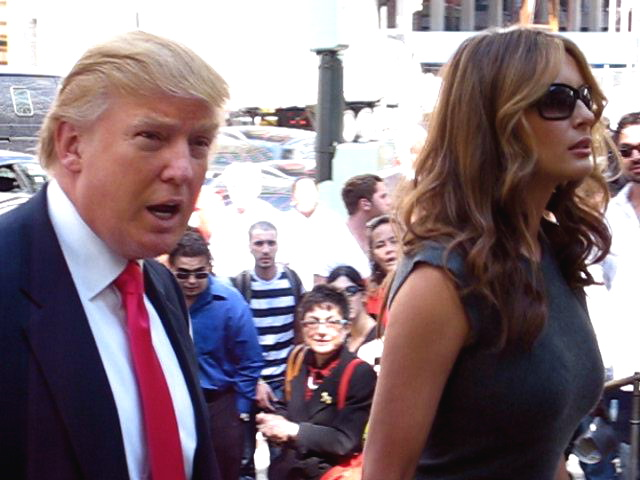
Melania Knauss was touted as Trump's potential First Lady.

On October 7, Trump announced on Larry King Live that he planned to form an exploratory committee to explore a Reform Party presidential bid. It was reported on the same day that the committee had been formed. Trump planned to use the committee, not to raise money—he would personally fund his campaign—but to advise him on political matters in preparation for a run. In the interview with Larry King, Trump was optimistic about his chances indicating a "very strong possibility" of victory. He referenced a non-scientific National Enquirer poll of 100 individuals, showing him in first place against his Democratic and Republican counterparts. When pressed, Trump identified Oprah Winfrey as his ideal choice for a running mate, describing her as "somebody that is very special," and that if she agreed to run, "she'd be fantastic ... she's popular, she's brilliant, she's a wonderful woman." Oprah's spokesperson later responded "Oprah is not running ... at this point in time." Trump labeled Rudy Giuliani the greatest Mayor of New York and spoke admirably of Presidents Dwight Eisenhower and Ronald Reagan, saying that Reagan had a demeanor that contributed to a phenomenal spirit in the nation. Trump argued that President Bill Clinton could have been a great president, but destroyed his legacy with the Lewinsky scandal. As for the Reform Party, Trump offered praise for both Perot and Ventura, and attacked potential primary opponent Buchanan as someone "enamored" with Adolf Hitler, based on Buchanan's thesis that Hitler presented no military threat to the U.S. ahead of World War II.

On the issues, Trump labeled himself "very conservative," but described his views on healthcare as "quite liberal" and "getting much more liberal", explaining "I believe in universal health care. I believe in whatever it takes to make people well and better. ... [I]t's an entitlement to this country if we're going to have a great country." He expressed opposition to NAFTA, gun control, and said he would like to see alcohol corporations sued in the same manner as tobacco corporations. For his first presidential term, he proclaimed, "I want to do the right job: straighten out Social Security, get the trade deficits in order, and lower taxes." As for the lack of a first lady, Trump said he could solve the issue "in 24 hours" by marrying his 29-year-old girlfriend, model Melania Knauss. In a later interview, Knauss said she would marry Trump under such notice. In the role, she said, "I would be very traditional. Like Betty Ford or Jackie Kennedy. I would support him." Trump described Knauss as "a woman of great style and elegance ... very poised and gracious and able to get along with everyone."

After the announcement, Trump and Knauss had dinner with Ventura and were joined by actor Woody Harrelson. Ventura later commented that Trump's chances of success depended on his impression of the Reform Party. Onlookers questioned Trump's motive in running. Democratic pollster Harrison Hickman expressed doubts about the authenticity of Trump's campaign, saying "It's all marketing of his name." Matt Bai of Newsweek commented "Most serious-minded people think Trump's flirtation with the Reform Party's presidential nomination is just a publicity stunt." Trump's ex-wife Ivana Trump doubted he would actually run. Former New York City Mayor Ed Koch commented that people would likely not flock to Trump's campaign, suggesting that Trump was merchandising his brand. Trump disagreed with the critics, arguing that even though his sales had increased as a result of media coverage, he was serious about the campaign. Roger Stone was hired as director of the exploratory committee.

== Primary campaign ==
=== October 1999 ===
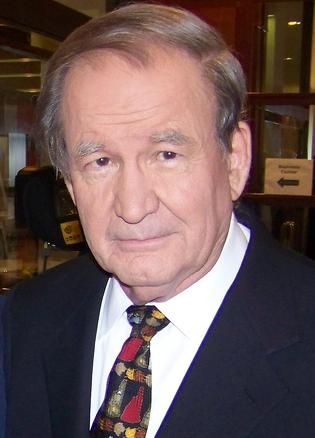
Pat Buchanan, Trump's main rival for the Reform Party nomination

Trump's announcement made way for the anticipated Buchanan–Trump primary contest with Buchanan himself moving closer to mounting a Reform Party bid. Buchanan announced he would decide whether to join the race by late October. A Schroth and Associates poll of 500 people who voted for Perot in 1996, showed Buchanan with a slight edge over Trump, 32 percent to 29 percent. Although Ventura wished to prevent a Buchanan nomination, he did not publicly endorse Trump. Some of Ventura's advisers were skeptical of Trump's campaign and wanted Ventura to leave the party if a Buchanan nomination appeared imminent. Ventura's place in the party had become a subject of controversy. Chairman Verney asked Ventura to leave the party in early October after Ventura commented in a Playboy interview that "organized religion is a sham and a crutch." Perot also decided not to make an endorsement during the primary campaign, despite Buchanan's plea that Perot publicly support his entrance into the race.

Before Trump could venture out on the campaign trail, he had to tend to some personal matters. In an interview with The Daily Telegraph, Marla Maples, Trump's second ex-wife, threatened to reveal what Trump "is really like" if he chose to run for president in the general election. In response, Trump withheld $1.5 million in alimony he owed Maples, claiming she was in violation of the confidentiality agreement in the couple's divorce decree. After a Manhattan judge refused to hear the matter, a brief conference was held, wherein the judge's law secretary advised Trump to pay the alimony and advised Maples that further incidents would be cause for the judge to reconsider hearing the matter. Trump's attorneys were satisfied that the meeting would cause Maples to rethink making any public statements on her marriage to Trump.

On October 24, Trump appeared on Meet the Press, where he announced that he would officially join the Reform Party. During the interview, Trump questioned why a politician was better suited to be president than him, commenting "I understand this stuff." He said that the Republican Party has become "too crazy right." Notably, he identified Buchanan as a "Hitler-lover" and mused, "I guess he's an anti-Semite ... He doesn't like the blacks, he doesn't like the gays. It's just incredible that anybody could embrace this guy." As for his reputation as a womanizer, Trump said he would not run if he believed it would be an impediment. The next day, Trump formally joined the Reform Party, changing his voter registration from Republican to Independence Party, the New York affiliate of the Reform Party. On the same day, Buchanan announced that he too would leave the Republican Party to join with the Reform Party and attempt to obtain its presidential nomination. Buchanan said he refused to engage in a "name-calling" contest with Trump but made a thinly veiled attack against Trump's wealth, arguing, "I don't believe the Reform Party nomination can be bought, and I don't believe the Presidency can be bought." On Face the Nation, Pat Choate, the Reform Party's 1996 vice presidential nominee, said Trump would "make a good candidate," but argued that Buchanan could challenge Trump "on the merits" and that Trump and the media were misrepresenting Buchanan's views through "hate politics." Other party members expressed reservations about Trump's comments and personal life. Verney wondered "what the compelling reason is for him to seek the presidency." Trump acknowledged himself as "certainly controversial" but labeled himself as "a great businessman," who would "make the greatest treaties that this country's seen in a long time." On Fox News Sunday, he criticized U.S. Trade Representative Charlene Barshefsky and said that as president he himself would fill the position and negotiate trade deals with other countries. He identified France, Japan, Germany, and Saudi Arabia as nations taking advantage of badly negotiated trade deals with the U.S.

=== November 1999 ===
In an effort speculated to implore the media to view the campaign more seriously, Trump rolled out a tax proposal that became the subject of attention. In a series of telephone interviews in early November, Trump proposed a one-time 14.25 percent "net worth tax" that would apply to individuals and trusts with assets greater than $10 million. The plan was meant to raise $5.7 trillion in revenue to wipe out the national debt, estimated at the time to be $5.66 trillion. The plan exempted one's homestead from the calculation. Trump estimated that the tax would only apply to one percent of the population and that the remaining 99 percent would receive a federal income tax cut as well as an elimination of the estate tax. He projected a 35 to 40 percent increase in economic activity as a result and eliminate $200 billion in federal interest payments, half of which would be used to fund middle class tax cuts and the rest to allocate for Social Security. The original plan provided only one year for taxpayers to pay the new tax, but that was later increased to 10 years. Economists predicted that enactment of the plan would "risk capital flight" and "prick" the stock market bubble. Bruce Bartlett of the National Center for Policy Analysis wrote in The Wall Street Journal that the proposed rate would fall short of its goal and that at any rate, would introduce "devastating" disruption to the economic system. Tax attorney Robert L. Sommers, writing in the San Francisco Chronicle, argued that many wealthy people lacked sufficient cash on hand to pay the tax and that doing so would lead to the mass liquidation of assets, "roil[ing] the stock and real estate markets." Trump defended his plan, rejecting the speculation that it would be "a shock to the system." Roger Stone noted that Trump had been thinking about the plan for a while and that he felt so strongly about it that he was willing to pay $725 million of his own money in taxes under it. CBS News speculated that the plan meant to appeal to middle and lower class Americans. Trump's tax plan differed significantly from the plan put forward by Reform Party rival Buchanan, who had called for a 16 percent flat tax on earnings over $35,000.

I think the only difference between me and the other candidates is that I'm more honest and my women are more beautiful.

— Donald Trump

Despite the discussion of substantive issues, the campaign's seriousness continued to come under attack. Ed Koch elevated his criticisms of the campaign, calling it "fraudulent" and arguing that Trump is the "greatest con artist in the world when it comes to trumpeting his own name ... [M]y gut tells me that he knows nothing [about policy]." Former White House adviser Dick Morris said "I think he's mainly selling books." Republican strategist Ed Rollins questioned whether Trump could "say the right things" or "be willing to let somebody put an organization together." A New York Daily News/WNBC-TV poll showed that 74% of New Yorkers believed the campaign was being used only for Trump "to promote himself." Roger Stone commented that the perception problem would "solve itself" once the campaign would reveal the number of petition signatures it collected. By mid-November, the campaign started receiving advice from political consultant Douglas Friedline, who ran Ventura's successful 1998 gubernatorial campaign. Upon Friedline's advice, Trump assembled communications and campaign staff, and began planning events in strategic states. On November 17, 1999, as a further step in organization, Trump set up a campaign website at the domain www.donaldjtrump2000.com and used Ventura's webmaster, Phil Madsen, to create an online community of supporters. According to Stone, the website was "very definitely" a sign Trump would seek the Reform Party nomination. Stone said the main aim of the site was to provide "information to the American people on Trump's national debt reduction plan." According to Madsen, because Trump was "not running as a Democrat or Republican" they would have to "create an organization out of nothing." Madsen received approval from Ventura to work for Trump, and said his goal was to create "E-team Trump." The website itself described Trump as the "experienced, decisive can-do businessman America needs as president in the new millennium."

On his first campaign stop, Trump traveled to Miami, Florida and spoke before the Cuban American National Foundation. The foundation invited Trump after he wrote a Miami Herald article denouncing Cuban President Fidel Castro and favoring the U.S. embargo against Cuba several months earlier. During the visit, Trump was met with supporters touting "Trump 2000" posters and shouting "Viva Donald Trump!" There, he delivered his first foreign policy speech, capped with the line, "I'd have, personally, two words for [Castro]: 'Adios, amigo!'" Covering the event, columnist Maureen Dowd wrote that the fascination with Trump was the "apotheosis of our Gilded Age," where "money, celebrity, polling, and crass behavior" warp politics and the television show Who Wants to Be a Millionaire dominates the culture. Following this theme, Saturday Night Live performed a sketch in which Darrell Hammond reprised his role as Trump, holding a press conference announcing Millionaire winner John Carpenter as his running mate. Soon thereafter, the actual Trump floated possible running mates and members of his presidential cabinet during a November 28 episode of Late Edition with Wolf Blitzer. He identified Senator John McCain, a Republican presidential candidate, as a possible Secretary of Defense. Trump said he would consider Democratic Congressman Charles Rangel for Secretary of Housing and Urban Development and mentioned retired General Colin Powell as a possible Secretary of State. He praised General Electric CEO Jack Welch, and discussed him as either Secretary of Treasury or running mate. He again mentioned Oprah Winfrey as a possible running mate. During the interview, Trump expressed his willingness to spend $100 million to self-finance a full-scale campaign. On November 28, Roger Stone appeared on the C-SPAN program Washington Journal with Susan Swain to discuss Trump's campaign. Stone mentioned the campaign website, said that mass communication was changing politics, referenced Ross Perot as a political game-changer, and told Swain: "The revolution has already happened. We're in a position here where the voters are fed up with both parties." Stone also responded to questions and comments from several callers to the program. The Reform Party scheduled a debate of the candidates seeking the presidential nomination on December 3 in Portland, Oregon. When a reporter asked a Trump aide whether Trump would appear, the aide was unaware of the debate. Ultimately, Buchanan attended but Trump did not.

Trump's proposed cabinet

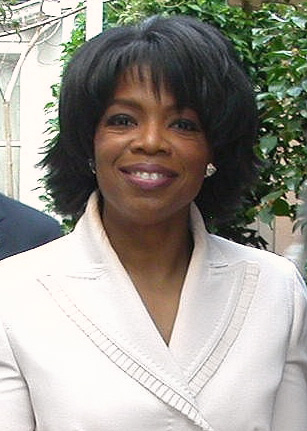
Media proprietor
Oprah Winfrey
Vice President

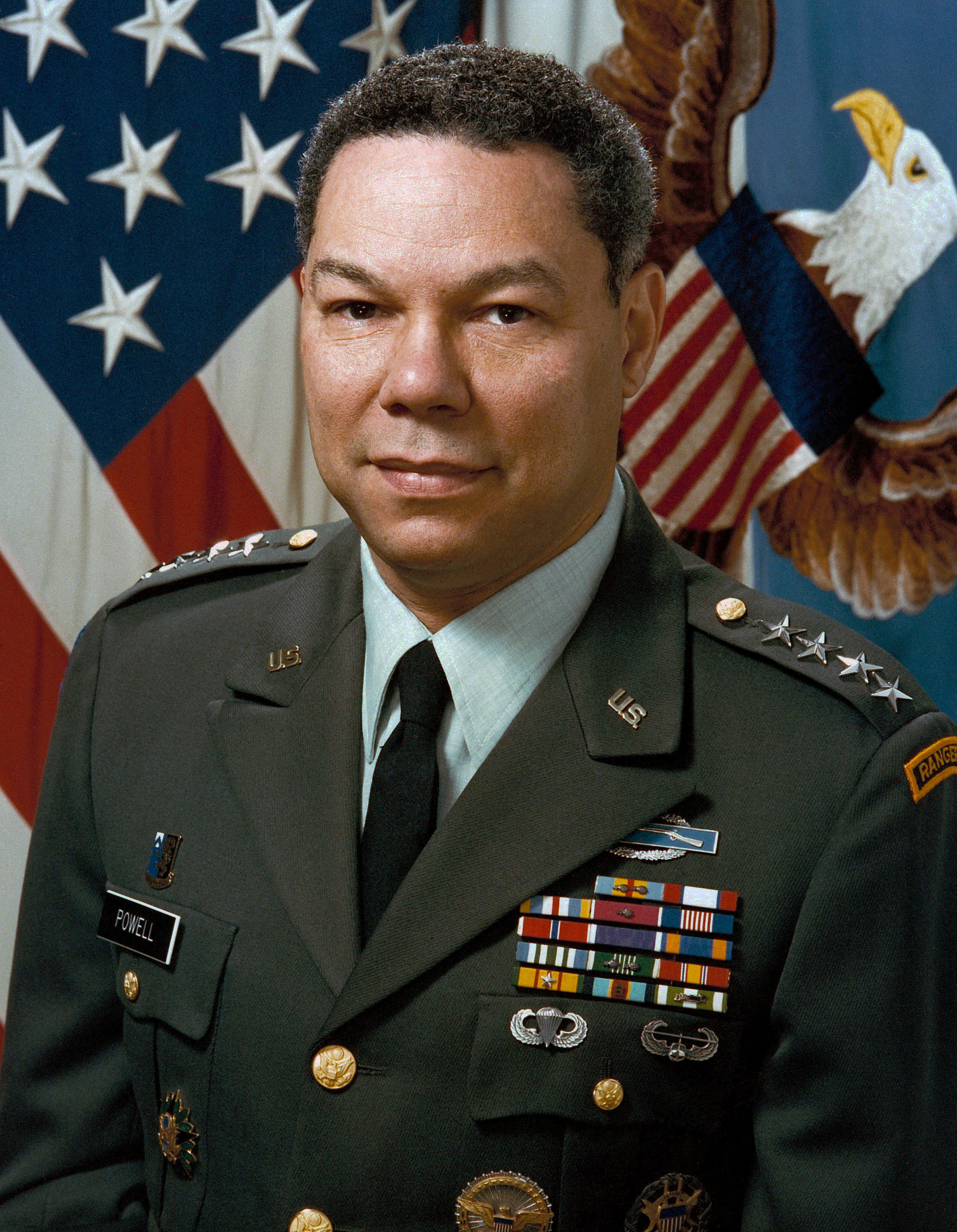
General
Colin Powell
Secretary of State

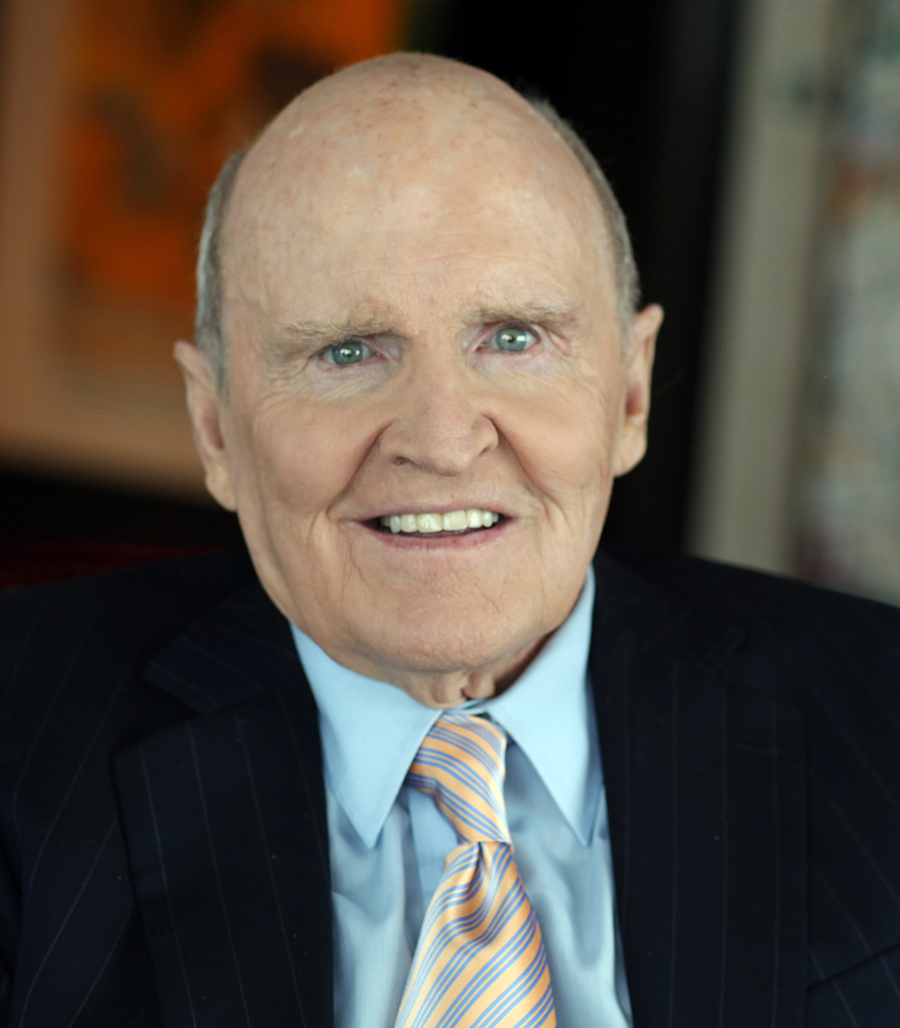
General Electric CEO
Jack Welch
Secretary of Treasury

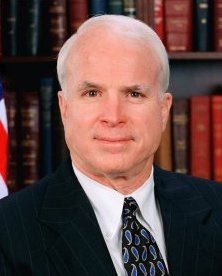
Senator
John McCain
Secretary of Defense

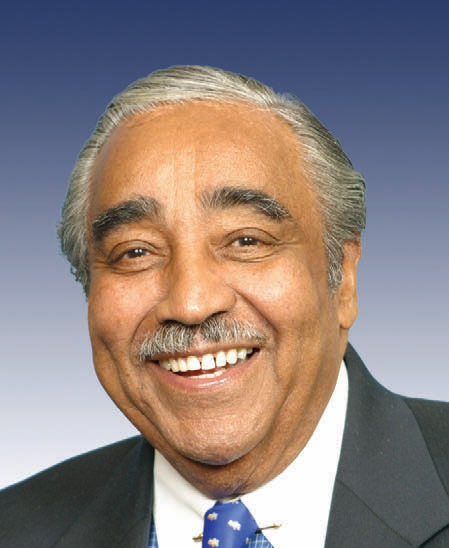
Congressman
Charles Rangel
Secretary of HUD

=== December 1999 ===
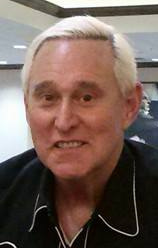
Top adviser Roger Stone was part of Trump's campaign entourage.

As the World Trade Organization (WTO) negotiations collapsed amid protests at a summit in Seattle, Trump appeared on the December 5 airing of ABC's This Week. He said that the WTO was not "necessarily fair" to the U.S., and argued that "our best, and our smartest, and our brightest" were not being used to negotiate the deal. He renewed his attack on the negotiation skills of Barshefsky, saying that both she and Secretary of Commerce William M. Daley did not know how to negotiate. Next, Trump embarked on a two-day campaign stop in California, which the media covered extensively. During the stop, Trump held a press conference, appearing with his campaign entourage that included Melania Knauss, Roger Stone, and bodyguard Matt Calamari. Aides made hand sanitizer readily available for reporters, presumably due to Trump's alleged germaphobia. The Associated Press (AP) noted that Trump "made little attempt to appear statesman-like" at the press conference with responses that seemed "tailored more to entertain his listeners than establish his credibility." In Burbank, Trump appeared on The Tonight Show with Jay Leno where he attacked Buchanan as "having a love affair with Adolf Hitler" and discussed his own upcoming book, The America We Deserve. The Weekly Standard reported that though the release date was only a month away, the book had yet to be written. After the Tonight Show appearance, Trump attended a meeting of one hundred Southern California Reform Party members, to whom he delivered a speech and answered questions. Crowds cheered Trump when he discussed his opposition to NAFTA, but some were offended when he questioned the existence of a Reform Party platform and, after receiving a copy, left it on the podium when he exited. On the final day, Trump visited the Simon Wiesenthal Center's Museum of Tolerance and walked through an exhibit of the Holocaust. He delivered a speech and held another press conference at the museum atrium, where he denounced Buchanan's views on Nazis. Afterwards, Trump boarded his jet for Long Beach. During an on-jet interview, Trump placed his odds of waging a full-scale campaign at "50/50," but "edging closer," believing there to be a "fervor" among the public about his campaign. The AP evaluated the California response as more "warm" than fervent, but described Trump's treatment as that of a "high profile dignitary." At Trump's final event, he spoke at a Tony Robbins motivational conference. Robbins and Trump had made an agreement that would pay Trump $1 million for showing up at ten of Robbins' events. Trump planned to make campaign stops to coincide with Robbins' shows, speculating that he "could be the first presidential candidate to run and make money on it." At the event, Trump received what the AP called a "moderately enthusiastic applause" after asking the 21,000 people in attendance whether he should run for president. He received a large ovation when he proclaimed, "people want to hear straight talk. We're tired of being bullied by these moron politicians." Overall, The Weekly Standard praised Trump for his candor on the campaign trail.

In discussing his campaign strategy with the Los Angeles Times, Trump proclaimed, "the only strategy is, I'll be on television a lot." Responding to a poll of probable Reform Party voters that showed him with only 14% support, fourth place behind Ventura (20%), Perot (25%), and Buchanan (30%), Trump pointed to the spike in ratings each television network received whenever he appeared on air. He admitted, "whether or not TV ratings can transfer into votes is an interesting question." The Times characterized Trump's campaign as "Political Science 101 on how far politics is devolving into pure entertainment." Nevertheless, Trump contemporaneously delved into the politics of third party campaigns when he wrote a letter to Commission on Presidential Debates asking the body to review its standard for third-party candidate inclusion in the general election debates. His letter included a veiled threat of litigation if the body enacted a standard preventing his participation. At this time, Trump announced that he would make his decision on whether to wage a full-scale campaign by early February. In addition, he retained two signature collection agencies in order to secure ballot access.

As 1999 drew to a close, the conflict within the Reform Party escalated. To the chagrin of the Perot faction, chairman-elect Jack Gargan pushed through a motion to move headquarters from Perot's home in Dallas to Florida. Shortly thereafter, the Perot faction incorporated the Reform Leadership Council as an entity separate from the main party to preserve the vision of Perot. They also moved the National Convention from Ventura's home in Minneapolis to Long Beach. The Ventura faction filed an unsuccessful lawsuit against the Perot faction and threatened to bolt the party, prompting chairman Verney to instruct, "don't let the door hit them when they leave." As the conflict unfolded, Ventura publicly expressed that he could never support Buchanan as the party's nominee, describing him as "very shallow." Ventura said that in a head-to-head against Buchanan, he favored Trump. Ventura and Trump planned a campaign event together in Minnesota to begin the new year.

=== January 2000 ===
Trump officially released his book The America We Deserve on January 1. Dave Shiflett received credit as co-writer. To promote the book, Trump held a January 5 press conference at Trump Tower, which aired on C-SPAN. He signed books and answered questions from reporters, once asserting, "I may be too honest to be a politician." Trump's book, consisting of 286 pages, covers Trump's political positions and policy proposals, including strict anti-crime measures, increased pressure on China, international trade, border control, increased military spending, support for public capital punishment, and the implementation of single-payer health care. It advocates eliminating soft money contributions to political parties and full disclosure of campaign donations to political candidates, but calls for the removal of limits on the amount of donations, arguing, "[i]f you want to give your life savings to Al Gore, that should be between you, Al Gore and your psychiatrist." In addition, it raises concerns about terrorism, proposing the creation of a national lottery to raise funds for anti-terrorism programs, and offers a choice to North Korea to disarm or face military strikes. The America We Deserve also includes praise for former boxer Muhammad Ali, Teamsters leader James P. Hoffa, as well as Trump's future political opponents Florida governor Jeb Bush and New York governor George Pataki, among others. It cites friendships with baseball player Sammy Sosa and entertainer Sean Combs as making Trump more understanding of racial diversity. Trump later backpedaled his book's praise of Combs after Combs was charged with violating gun laws following a shooting at a New York nightclub. Trump said he did not "know [Combs] really well." The book condemns Congressman Jerrold Nadler as a "hack" for opposing Trump's development of waterfront real estate in Manhattan, and describes Senator Bob Smith as "the dumbest guy in the U.S. Senate" after he grilled Trump's sister Maryanne Trump Barry on abortion when she testified before the Senate Judiciary Committee in 1999 upon her nomination to the Third Circuit Court of Appeals. It criticizes Democratic presidential candidate Bill Bradley as a "phony" for his Senate sponsorship of the Tax Reform Act of 1986 that purportedly hurt Trump financially. It also notes the hypocrisy of both an unnamed Senator and an unnamed conservative columnist who each engaged in extramarital affairs at Trump's hotels and resorts while they attacked President Clinton for the Lewinsky scandal. In a scathing review, New York Magazine described the book as inadvertently satirical. Booklist pondered whether Trump was "the only man ever to run for president in order to promote a book." Dave Saltonstall of the New York Daily News, labeled it as autobiographical and reported that it contains "enough details to paint a fairly comprehensive picture of what a Trump presidency might look like."

On January 7, Trump appeared in Brooklyn Park, Minnesota, where he spoke before the Chamber of Commerce, attended a Reform Party fundraiser, and held a joint press conference with Ventura. At the fundraiser, Trump identified North Korea as the nation's greatest foreign policy threat, blasted Japan for "ripping us off" for the last 25 years, and ripped Russia as being "totally mixed up" for placing "people nobody ever even heard of" in charge of missiles. At the press conference, Trump claimed he had yet to decide whether to run officially and so had not asked for Ventura's endorsement. Ventura said that if Trump decided to run, he would give his "full consideration." Trump asserted it would be "disaster for the Reform Party" if Pat Buchanan received the presidential nomination. Describing himself and Ventura as self-made and not part of the "lucky sperm club," Trump made an indirect jab at both the Republican front-runner George W. Bush, the son of former President Bush, and Democratic front-runner Al Gore, son of the late Senator Albert Gore, Sr. Trump and Ventura released a written statement opposing the Commission on Presidential Debates' decision to limit debate participation to candidates polling above 15 percent in the general election and urging the Federal Election Commission to take action.

Trump ended his relationship with Melania Knauss in January 2000, removing a key figure of the campaign entourage. According to the New York Daily News, an associate of Trump said the move was meant to appease Reform Party leaders. Roger Stone denied the suggestion. In addressing the matter, Trump complimented Knauss and commented, "she will be missed." Shortly thereafter, in an attempt to bring the two Reform Party factions together, Trump invited party leaders to the Trump-owned Mar-a-Lago club in Palm Beach, Florida. Addressing the 170 party members, who attended the event (including former chairman Russ Verney), Trump proclaimed "I'm very proud to be in the party of Ross Perot and Jesse Ventura." Verney appreciated the gesture and in shifting from his once-chilly reception to the Trump candidacy, he welcomed Trump into the race. After opening the event to questions, one attendee asked Trump whether he would appear at the Florida Reform Party's state convention. Trump said he would consider it "very seriously." Concerning Buchanan, Trump repeated he could not support Buchanan as the party's nominee. Despite the retreat, the intra-party dispute over the location of the convention continued. Citing scheduling conflicts, Trump did not attend the Florida Reform Party's state convention. Reports suggested that Trump insiders believed Buchanan had packed the convention with supporters and would embarrass Trump by winning all the state's delegates. There were also growing indications Trump was considering withdrawing from the race, commenting that he was "deeply concerned" about the conflict within the party. In another attempt to unite the party's factions, Trump wrote letters to Ventura and Perot, requesting the two make peace. Trump believed the instability of the party would hinder his chances of presidential success. Stone commented that "the [Reform] party is melting down before our very eyes." On the final day of January, Trump was removed from the New York primary ballot after a judge determined that Trump's supporters had failed to obtain the required 5,000 signatures from registered Reform Party members. This marked a victory for Buchanan's supporters, including leftist activist Lenora Fulani, who had hoped to prevent Trump from appearing on the ballot in his home state.

=== February 2000 ===
Despite Trump's efforts, the conflict within the Reform Party escalated. A special Reform Party meeting was planned for Nashville at which the Perot faction was expected to vacate the national chairmanship of Ventura-ally Jack Gargan. Both Trump and Ventura expressed disgust with the national party. Ventura desired to disassociate the Minnesota Reform Party from the national party. An unnamed official within the party told the AP that Ventura and Trump discussed a scenario where Ventura would run as the presidential nominee of the disaffiliated party with Trump as his running mate. The chairman of the Minnesota Reform Party denied Ventura would be part of any presidential ticket. After privately notifying Trump of his intentions and seeking his blessing, Ventura held a press conference on February 12 and officially left the national Reform Party, remaining a member of his state party, which he urged to disaffiliate and return to its original name, the Independence Party of Minnesota. He voiced dissatisfaction with the presidential contest, explaining that Pat Buchanan was running "virtually unopposed" and receiving support from former Ku Klux Klan leader David Duke; something with which Ventura could not associate. Ventura invited Trump to run for the presidential nomination of the Independence Party, which Ventura believed could become a national entity. At the party's next meeting, it disaffiliated. Trump considered Ventura's invitation but had concerns, particularly the question of whether other state parties would affiliate with the new party. Minnesota political scientist Steve Schier doubted the party could become a national entity, arguing that it was far too small to make an impact on the national level. Ventura's move came just ahead of the Nashville meeting where, with the rationale of failing to "faithfully perform and execute the duties of his office," Gargan was removed by a 109 to 31 committee vote. The chaotic meeting, dominated by Perot-faction members, featured shoving matches and physical squabbles as the Metropolitan Nashville Police Department intervened to restore order. Gargan charged that the meeting was illegal due to insufficient notice, though a quorum was present.

== Withdrawal ==
So the Reform Party now includes a Klansman—Mr. Duke, a Neo-Nazi—Mr. Buchanan, and a Communist—Ms. Fulani.
This is not company I wish to keep.

— Donald Trump

On February 14, Trump withdrew from the race. In a press release, he cited infighting in the Reform Party as not "conducive to victory," concluding he could not win the election as the party's nominee and so, as pledged, would not continue his campaign. He expressed concerns about the direction of the party, particularly its membership, referring to David Duke, Pat Buchanan, and Lenora Fulani as a Klansman, a Neo-Nazi, and a Communist, respectively. However, he lauded party members Russ Verney, Jack Gargan, and others as "wonderful people" he was honored to meet. Trump lamented the exit of Jesse Ventura from the party, arguing "without Jesse, the Reform Party is just an extremist shell and cannot be a force or even a factor in 2000." Trump declined to seek the nomination of Ventura's new Independence Party, finding it "healthy" but too young to win. He expressly kept open the possibility of running for president in 2004. Trump publicly announced his withdrawal on The Today Show in an interview with Matt Lauer. He explained that though he still could have won the Reform Party nomination, he believed he would only win 20 percent in the general election, which he did not want. He claimed the party was on the verge of "self-destructing" and referred to it as a "total mess." In response, Pat Choate, who became the new Reform Party chairman after the unseating of Gargan, disputed Trump's claim about the party and said Trump's campaign was meant only "to smear Pat Buchanan." He declared Trump "unwelcome" to seek the party's 2004 presidential nomination. Choate later remarked that he believed Trump's campaign was a "Republican dirty trick" orchestrated by Roger Stone "to disgust people and drive them away from the Reform Party." Stone argued that John McCain "running on Trump's message" and surging in the polls signaled an end to the Trump campaign.

Several days after withdrawing, Trump reflected on his campaign in an op-ed published in The New York Times titled "What I Saw at the Revolution." Disputing the claim that he ran for the publicity, Trump countered that he felt the nation was ready for a non-establishment "businessman president" who offered "straight talk." He cited three reasons for dropping out: (1) the criteria of the Commission on Presidential Debates, which would have made it "impossible" for him to qualify for general election debates; (2) the rise of the presidential campaign of John McCain, whose similar message would have made a contrast difficult; and (3) the exit of Ventura from the Reform Party. Trump called his run the "greatest civics lesson that a private citizen can have," but said it was "enormous fun" and a "great life experience," though it "doesn't compare with completing one of the great skyscrapers of Manhattan."

== Results ==
During the campaign, Trump qualified for the Michigan and California Reform Party presidential primaries. Both of these elections were held after Trump exited the race. On February 22, Trump won the Michigan Primary with 2,164 votes defeating uncommitted with 948 votes. Trump won the California primary on March 7 with 15,311 votes (44.28%) defeating perennial candidate George D. Weber who received 9,390 votes (27.16%), former Director of Advanced Space Programs Development Robert M. Bowman who received 4,879 (14.11%), former Congressman John B. Anderson who received 3,158 (9.13%), and political activist Charles E. Collins who received 1,837 (5.31%). Pat Buchanan was not listed on either ballot. A slate of Trump supporters petitioned to list Trump on the New York Independence Party presidential primary ballot but were denied on a technicality.

Pat Buchanan eventually won the Reform Party presidential nomination at a chaotic National Convention in Long Beach in August 2000. Buchanan had lost the support of the Perot faction, which accused Buchanan of fraud and held a counter-convention, nominating Buchanan's only major opponent physicist John Hagelin of the Natural Law Party. According to Russ Verney, the Perot faction lost faith in Buchanan when he emphasized anti-abortion and anti-homosexual issue positions after promising to respect the party's neutral stance on social issues. After the filing of a complaint over the party's matching funds, the FEC ruled against the Perot faction and invalided the Hagelin selection. The decision was affirmed on appeal. On Election Day, Buchanan appeared on the ballot in all 50 states and received 448,895 votes, 0.42% of the popular vote. George W. Bush defeated Al Gore in a close contest that required a recount and Supreme Court intervention. The Bush campaign recruited Roger Stone to oversee the recount.

Reform Party presidential primary results by county

California
Donald Trump
John B. Anderson
Robert M. Bowman
Charles E. Collins
George D. Weber
No votes

Michigan
Donald Trump
Uncommitted
Tie
No votes

== Aftermath ==
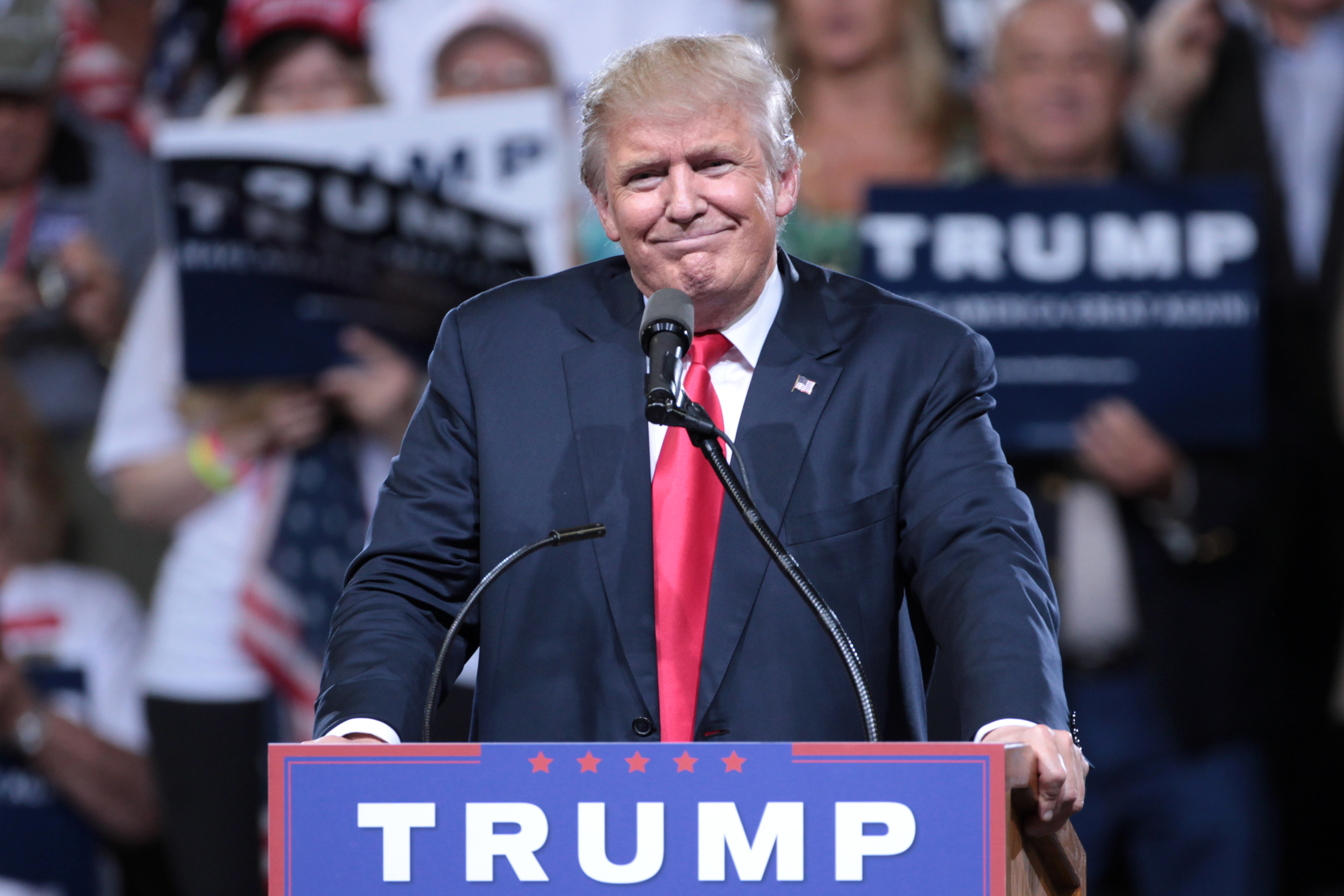
Trump speaks at a campaign event in 2016.

After the election, Trump returned to his real estate business, rekindled his relationship with Melania Knauss, whom he married in 2005, and hosted NBC's The Apprentice and The Celebrity Apprentice for 14 seasons from 2004 to 2015. In addition, he continued an involvement in politics. He changed his voter registration from the New York Independence Party (Reform Party affiliate) to the Democratic Party in August 2001 as the Reform Party continued its decline. By 2004, the party had lost ballot access in all but seven states, which it gave to Independent presidential candidate Ralph Nader. Trump was critical of the George W. Bush administration's handling of the Iraq War and publicly endorsed Bush's impeachment. He considered challenging Bush in the 2004 Republican presidential primaries, but ultimately decided against it. Jesse Ventura, who chose not to run for re-election as Governor of Minnesota in 2002, also considered a 2004 presidential run and publicly asked for and received Trump's support at WrestleMania XX. However, Ventura did not run.

In 2009 after Barack Obama took office, Trump changed his voter registration from Democrat back to Republican. He seriously considered running for president as a Republican in 2012 and led in an April 2011 Rasmussen Reports survey. While considering a run, Trump emphasized China's currency manipulation and criticized the trade policies of the Obama administration. Additionally, he questioned the legitimacy of Obama's citizenship and birth certificate. He decided not to run in May 2011, but proclaimed "I maintain the strong conviction that if I were to run, I would be able to win the primary and, ultimately, the general election." After reports that a group in Texas was attempting to create the "Make America Great Again Party" with the intention of running Trump as a candidate, Trump briefly considered a 2012 Independent bid and changed his voter registration from Republican to "I do not wish to enroll in a party." Trump said he would run if the Republicans selected the "wrong candidate." Ultimately, he again decided against running. Trump re-registered as a Republican in 2012 and publicly endorsed Republican presidential nominee Mitt Romney for president.

After much speculation, Trump officially decided to run for president as a Republican for the 2016 election, using the motto "Make America Great Again." In his announcement speech in June 2015, Trump took a tough stance against illegal immigration and promised to build a wall on the U.S.–Mexico border if elected president. After announcing, Trump became the front-runner for the nomination, taking the lead in nearly every national poll, ahead of his rivals for the Republican nomination including Jeb Bush, retired neurosurgeon Ben Carson, Senator Ted Cruz of Texas, and Senator Marco Rubio of Florida. Trump styled himself as the candidate of anti-establishment Republicans and received praise from former rival Pat Buchanan, who compared Trump's run to Buchanan's 1992 and 1996 campaigns. His attacks on the Republican establishment included a slight against the war hero status of John McCain, whom Trump complimented during his 2000 campaign. Republican voters favored the purported honesty of Trump's message and his abrasive approach, which eschewed political correctness. Roger Stone, who headed Trump's 2000 presidential committee, served as an adviser for the 2016 campaign until a much publicized split in August 2015. The campaign generated major media attention and attracted large crowds to campaign events. Trump won multiple Republican primaries, receiving more votes than any previous Republican candidate, and earned the party's presidential nomination at the 2016 Republican National Convention. In the general election, Trump defeated Democratic presidential nominee Hillary Clinton to be elected the 45th president of the U.S. He lost his re-election bid in 2020 to Democratic presidential nominee Joe Biden. Trump returned as the 47th president after defeating Democratic presidential nominee Kamala Harris in the 2024 presidential election.

== See also ==
- Political career of Donald Trump
