= Sarah Kendzior =

American journalist (born 1978)

- Born: Sarah Kendzior; September 1, 1978 (age 48)
- Education: Sarah Lawrence College; Indiana University Bloomington; Washington University in St. Louis
- Occupations: Journalist; Author; Anthropologist
- Website: sarahkendzior.com

Sarah Kendzior (born September 1, 1978) is an American journalist and author. Kendzior is the author of The View from Flyover Country – a collection of essays first published by Al Jazeera – and is a former co-host of the Gaslit Nation podcast. In 2020, she published her second book, Hiding in Plain Sight: The Invention of Donald Trump and the Erosion of America, which was a New York Times bestseller. In September 2022, she published her third book, They Knew: How a Culture of Conspiracy Keeps America Complacent, which was a finalist for a Los Angeles Times Book Prize. In April 2025, she published her fourth book, The Last American Road Trip, which was a USA Today Bestseller.

== Early life and education ==
Kendzior was raised in Meriden, Connecticut.

In 2000, Kendzior received a Bachelor of Arts in history from Sarah Lawrence College and, in 2006, she received a Master of Arts in Eurasian Studies from the Department of Central Eurasian Studies at Indiana University Bloomington. Her thesis was titled "State Propaganda on Islam in Independent Uzbekistan." In 2012, Kendzior earned a Doctor of Philosophy in anthropology from Washington University in St. Louis. Her dissertation was "The Uzbek Opposition in Exile: Diaspora and Dissident Politics in the Digital Age," and her advisor was John Bowen. Her focus of study was former Soviet Union totalitarian states. Kendzior's dissertation was on how dissidents from Uzbekistan used the internet to challenge an authoritarian government in a climate of surveillance and distrust.

== Career ==
From 2000 to 2003, Kendzior worked as an online news editor and writer for the New York Daily News. From 2012 to 2014, Kendzior was a columnist for Al Jazeera. From 2016 to 2020, Kendzior was a columnist for The Globe and Mail. She has also written for The Guardian, Foreign Policy, Marie Claire, and other outlets. Some of Kendzior's journalism has focused locally on St. Louis.

Kendzior has frequently appeared on MSNBC on the AM Joy show hosted by Joy Reid.

Kendzior and Bill Kristol were the main speakers for the 7th annual Public Values Symposium held on March 29, 2019, at the University of Missouri–Saint Louis. The two speakers saw "eye-to-eye... on the importance of people speaking up for what they believe in the face of eroding societal norms." They disagreed on the role of American institutions, which Kendzior described as corrupt and unable to stave off authoritarianism, with Kendzior noting, “Belief in American exceptionalism is what got us here.”

Kendzior was a featured speaker for the Canadian Journalism Foundation's annual Ottawa J-Talk on April 9, 2019.

Regarding her coverage of Donald Trump, Kendzior has stated that she has had "three advantages":

I transitioned into covering the presidential election in March 2016. I had three advantages in covering Donald Trump specifically as a candidate. First, I worked in New York tabloid media, so I knew exactly how he marketed himself. Then, I studied dictatorships and authoritarian regimes the entire time I was doing my PhD.... A lot of things that Trump was doing in his campaign reminded me of things I saw in Uzbekistan, Russia, and other authoritarian states around the world. Alarm bells started going off in my head.... Third, I live in the center of the country, not in D.C. or New York. When they talk about how hard things are out here, that's accurate.

Arthur Levitt interviewed Kendzior about her book and career in a May 2019 podcast for Bloomberg News.

The Columbia Journalism Review reported that because of her writings and expertise on authoritarian states, "as the new president came into power and the specter of Russian interference in his victory triggered Mueller's investigation, the limos started lining up" to drive Kendzior to interviews at television studios because her insights are valuable to the public.

== The View from Flyover Country ==
In 2015, Kendzior self-published her first book as an ebook – a collection of essays on the American condition first published by Al Jazeera starting in 2013 – called The View from Flyover Country.

In June 2017, speaking to an American Library Association conference, Hillary Clinton described herself as "riveted by... The View From Flyover Country, which turned out to be especially relevant in the midst of our current health-care debate."

In April 2018, Flatiron Books published an updated print version of The View . The New York Post described it as a "collection of essays from the talented Kendzior, who writes intelligently and with great empathy about problems faced by the Midwest." The Buffalo News described Kendzior's The View as "an astonishment and a challenge to convention for all sorts of reasons," and described Kendzior as having "roared to the fore" because of her prediction of the 2016 election results, a result of having studied foreign demagogues and understanding deteriorating conditions in the U.S.

The book was listed as a New York Times bestseller in May 2018.

== Gaslit Nation podcast ==
Together with Andrea Chalupa, Kendzior co-hosted a podcast, Gaslit Nation, which originated as part of Dame magazine. In Psychology Today, Joe Pierre stated that the podcast "frequently reminds listeners that the Trump administration is part of a 'transnational crime syndicate masquerading as a government'", stating that

The podcast’s title, Gaslit Nation, refers to their assertion that the Trump administration is "gaslighting" America in precisely the way that Arendt, Orwell, and Pomerantzev [sic] have described, by repeatedly contradicting the facts and claiming that black is white. This assertion is supported by independent databases maintained by Politifact and The Washington Post that tally false claims involving President Trump. According to The Washington Post's Fact Checker, President Trump has made 15,413 false or misleading statements (and counting) since taking office. Many of these... have been repeated again and again to the point that some no doubt believe it.

In October 2023, Kendzior announced she would no longer appear on the podcast.

== Incidents during the Trump administration ==
In 2016, Kendzior wrote about similarities between Donald Trump and the authoritarian leaders she had studied given Trump's admiration for Russian president Vladimir Putin before there was widespread public awareness of Russia's interference in the US election.

== Personal life ==
Kendzior lives in St. Louis, Missouri, with her husband and their children.

== Selected works and publications ==
=== Books ===
- Kendzior, Sarah (2018). The View from Flyover Country: Dispatches from the Forgotten America. New York: Flatiron Books. ISBN 978-1-250-18999-8. OCLC 1006491098.
- Kendzior, Sarah (2020). Hiding in Plain Sight: The Invention of Donald Trump and the Erosion of America. New York: Flatiron Books. ISBN 978-1-250-24539-7. OCLC 1147702789.
- Kendzior, Sarah (2022). They Knew : How a Culture of Conspiracy Keeps America Complacent. Flatiron Books. ISBN 9781250210722. OCLC 1289250691.
- Kendzior, Sarah (2025). The Last American Road Trip. New York: Flatiron Books (published April 1, 2025). ISBN 978-1250879882. OCLC 1429657731.

=== Selected publications ===
- Kendzior, Sarah (2006). State Propaganda on Islam in Independent Uzbekistan (M.A.). Indiana University. OCLC 761020312.
- Kendzior, Sarah (December 14, 2007). "Poetry of witness: Uzbek identity and the response to Andijon". Central Asian Survey. 26 (3): 317–334. doi:10.1080/02634930701702365. S2CID 144552452. Wikidata ()
- Kendzior, Sarah (August 2011). "Digital distrust: Uzbek cynicism and solidarity in the Internet Age". American Ethnologist. 38 (3): 559–575. doi:10.1111/J.1548-1425.2011.01323.X. Archived from the original on June 23, 2020. Wikidata ()
- Pearce, Katy E.; Kendzior, Sarah (April 2012). "Networked Authoritarianism and Social Media in Azerbaijan". Journal of Communication. 62 (2): 283–298. doi:10.1111/J.1460-2466.2012.01633.X. Wikidata ()
- Kendzior, Sarah (2012). The Uzbek Opposition in Exile: Diaspora and Dissident Politics in the Digital Age (PhD). Washington University in St. Louis. doi:10.7936/K7PK0D3M. OCLC 853623602.
- Pearce, Katy E.; Freelon, Deen; Kendzior, Sarah (June 2, 2014). "The effect of the Internet on civic engagement under authoritarianism: The case of Azerbaijan". First Monday. 19 (6). doi:10.5210/fm.v19i6.5000.
- Kendzior, Sarah (December 1, 2015). "Recognize the Spies". Social Analysis. 59 (4): 50–65. doi:10.3167/sa.2015.590404.
- Kendzior, Sarah (November 20, 2018). "Redefining Religion: Uzbek Atheist Propaganda in Gorbachev-Era Uzbekistan". Nationalities Papers. 34 (5): 533–548. doi:10.1080/00905990600952954. S2CID 153815671. Wikidata ()
