= Hiding in Plain Sight (Kendzior book) =

2020 non-fiction book by Sarah Kendzior

Hiding in Plain Sight: The Invention of Donald Trump and the Erosion of America
- First edition
- Author: Sarah Kendzior
- Language: English
- Genre: Political science
- Publisher: Flatiron (Macmillan)
- Publication date: 2020
- Pages: 288
- ISBN: 978-1-250-21071-5
- OCLC: 1150904978

Hiding in Plain Sight: The Invention of Donald Trump and the Erosion of America is a nonfiction book on the rise of Donald Trump. Written by Sarah Kendzior, the book was published in the United States in 2020.

== Topics covered ==
Kendzior's book traces the context and describes the history over the past 40 years of Donald Trump as a real estate developer with long-standing ties to organized crime. In explaining context, she describes economic transformation and decline of the US, including her current home town of St. Louis (first chapter titled "The bellwether of American decline"). The remainder of the book's major chapters describe Trump's network and its foothold within or effects upon American society. These remaining chapters are approximately chronological, focusing in turn on the 1980s ("The 1980s: Roy Cohn's Orwellian America"), the 1990s ("The 1990s: elite exploits of the new world order"), the early 2000s ("The early 2000s: reality TV terror"), the late 2000s ("The late 2000s: heirs to the crash"), 2010–2016 ("2010–2016: revolution shakedown"), and 2016–2019 ("2016–2019: 'a threat more extensive than is widely known'"). The book also contains an epilogue.

== Reviews and influence ==
On 15 April 2020 the Washington Post listed Hiding in Plain Sight among the top ten bestselling non-fiction books. On April 26 and several other dates, Publishers Weekly (as reported by the St. Louis Post-Dispatch) listed Hiding in Plain Sight as a bestselling book in the category "Adults". On 23 April 2020, Hiding in Plain Sight was listed as a bestseller in the "New Release" category by the Vancouver Sun.

Reviews have appeared in Library Journal, Kirkus Reviews, Publishers Weekly, and The Arts Fuse. Library Journal characterized Hidden in Plain Sight as "A chilling account of how the media, government, and public have failed to hold Trump accountable, and how this has significantly impacted U.S. democracy." Publishers Weekly wrote that "Political junkies will be familiar with much of Kendzior's claims, but she offers a few surprises and many valuable insights into the president's psychological motivations and methods of manipulation. This comprehensive, page-turning account presents a stark and uncompromising indictment of the Trump presidency as the culmination of a 'decades-long erosion of American stability, integrity, and democracy'." Kirkus Reviews described the book as "A passionate call for immediate action against the 'transnational crime syndicate' that has supplanted the U.S."

Keith Gottschalk, writing in Medium, stated that he was "struck by the sheer volume of jaw dropping revelations about Trump that are obviously unknown to his biggest fans". He wrote that

Kendzior pulls no punches. What is detailed in these pages is, in reality, a true crime work, with the President of the United States as the benefactor of a criminal machine so powerful and immense that it seems every institution of American government and media has, in some way, been compromised by it ... You sense that struggle between the writing of a political scientist and the inner rage of a pissed off citizen throughout the book, and it's a quality that makes her writing so approachable. These are not just bad events in time, but inextricably entwined in the stuff of our lives, and their consequences will reverberate throughout the generations. And people should be pissed about it ... If you need to have a reason to believe and fight for your children and those yet unborn, read this book.

Vogue published an interview with Kendzior about the book. The interviewer characterized the book as "a kind of counter-narrative to what so many of us assume about Trump—that he's some kind of comic book villain who came out of nowhere ... Hiding in Plain Sight lays out the rise of Trump as something that's been in the works for decades and involves a rather large cast of criminals and enablers." When the interviewer asked Kendzior whether she saw "something about his administration's response to this global [COVID-19] pandemic that's beyond mere incompetence or cynicism", Kendzior responded that

As I write in my book, Trump covers up crime with scandal and covers up malice with incompetence. His administration would like you to think that they're inept, that they're just stumbling into these situations. That's not the case. And the key thing to remember is that it's not Trump as some geopolitical mastermind; it's an inner circle of Republican backers and ideological extremists, many of whom have massive financial interests and certainly their own agenda.

== Editions ==
The book was published in 2020 by Flatiron Press, a division of Macmillan:

- Kendzior, Sarah (2020). Hiding in plain sight: the invention of Donald Trump and the erosion of America. New York: Flatiron (Macmillan). ISBN 978-1-250-21071-5. OCLC 1150904978.
