= Kate Bohner =

American journalist (born 1967)

- Born: April 14, 1967 (age 59); Wilmington, Delaware, US
- Education: Columbia Journalism School; University of Pennsylvania
- Occupations: Journalist and writer
- Website: www.bohnerbespoke.com

Kate Bohner (born April 14, 1967) is an American journalist and author. She was a correspondent for CNBC, associate editor for Forbes magazine, and ghostwriter of Trump: The Art of the Comeback with Donald Trump. Bohner has also been a vlogger, investment banker, and businessperson.

== Early life and education ==
Bohner was born April 14, 1967, in Wilmington, Delaware. After studying business and international studies at the University of Pennsylvania, graduating in 1988, Bohner began her career at investment bank Lazard. After she left Lazard, she attended the Columbia University School of Journalism, graduating in 1992 with a Master of Science degree in journalism.

== Career ==
At Forbes, Bohner wrote for various sections of the magazine, including the column "The Informer". During her time at Forbes, she was an on-air contributor to CNN and to E! Entertainment Network. She has also written for publications such as Harper’s Bazaar, Marie Claire, and George. She reportedly co-authored Donald Trump's 1997 book Trump: The Art of the Comeback. The book hit both the New York Times (#3), the Wall Street Journal (#1) and Businessweek (#2) Bestseller's Lists. However, in an article for the New York Observer which was documented on August 1, 1997 and was published in the newspaper on November 3, 1997, Candace Bushnell detailed how Bohner was in fact Trump: the Art of the Comeback's ghostwriter. While writing for Trump, Bohner was nicknamed "Kateso". That same year she became a correspondent for CNBC, launching “Business Center”, with Maria Bartiromo and Tyler Mathisen. She went on to write and broadcast “Kate Bohner’s Power File” on CNBC’s Power Lunch. In 1998, Jack Reilly, the former executive producer at CNBC, joined her and other NBC veterans in founding a startup internet news service, JAGfn, providing online content similar to that found on CNBC. She worked at E*Trade's start-up financial news effort, a six-day per week webcast from New York City—the show also aired on Sundays on WNEW 102.7 FM. Bohner co-founded medical technology start-up Living Independently, Inc./QuietCare Systems (Care Innovations) in 2001, where she served as chief marketing officer and chief operating officer. In 2006, the company was sold to GE Healthcare and Intel.

Bohner launched “Kate’s Take” on her own YouTube channel KBTVonline in 2006. KBTVonline was a four-minute daily videoblog based and shot in South Florida. The show covered a wide range of information from top news stories to quirky pop culture, finance, politics, healthcare and style. On Christmas Day of 2007, KBTVonline's video hit #1 in 19 countries. Bohner left South Florida for Los Angeles in 2008 and in 2010, she co-founded and became national director of Flybarre, a fitness program part of Flywheel Sports. In 2012, Bohner became chief marketing officer and director of communications at the World Trade Financial Group.

In 2013, Bohner joined DMS Offshore Investment Services Ltd., a fund governance firm, to serve as chief communications, research & marketing officer and managing director

== Personal life ==
Bohner was reported to be in a relationship with Google's executive chairman Eric Schmidt from 2006 to 2010.

She was previously married to author Michael Lewis, known for his bestselling books Liar's Poker, The New New Thing, The Blind Side, and Moneyball.
