= Jeffrey Robinson =

American author (born 1945)

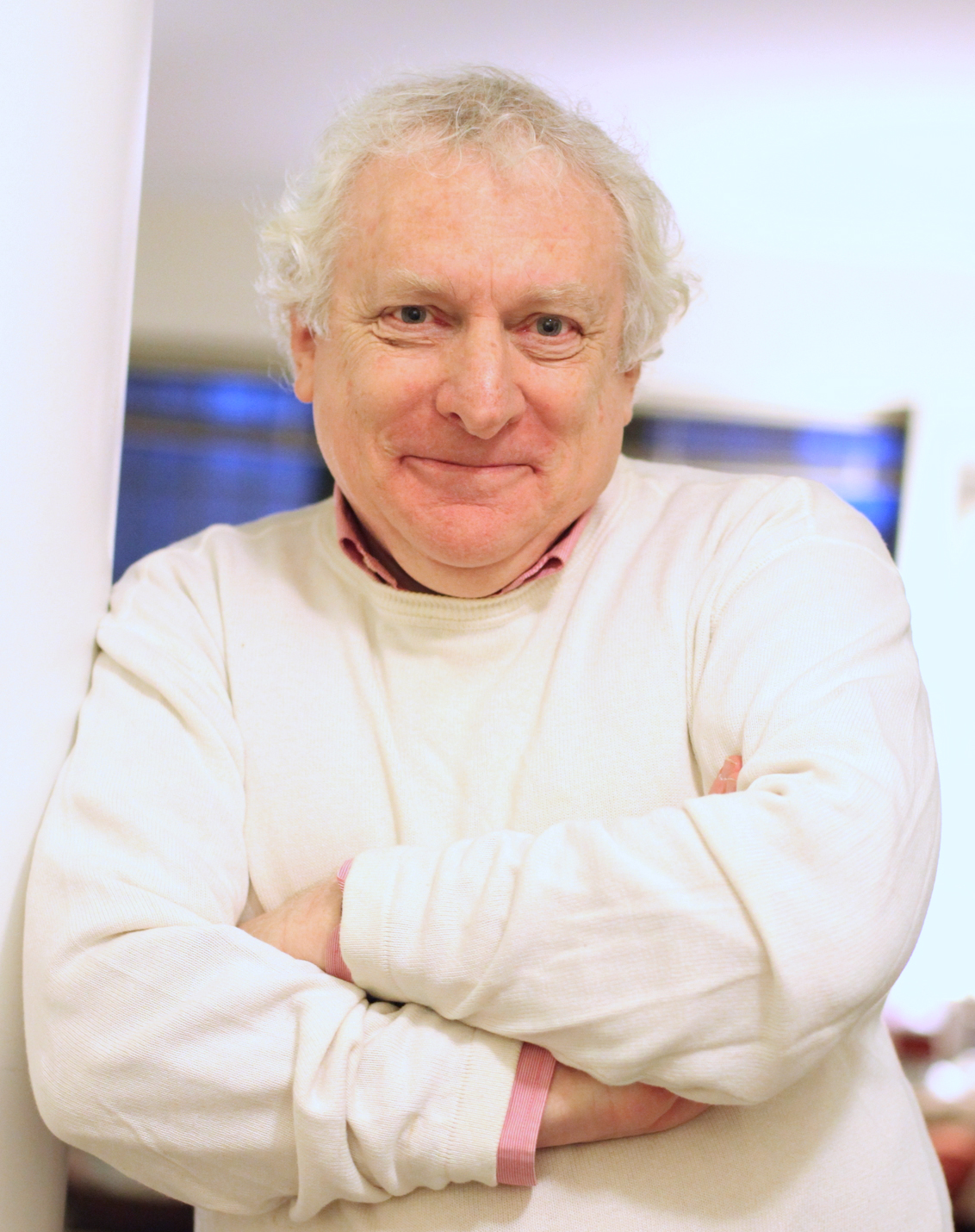
Author Jeffrey Robinson

Jeffrey Robinson (born October 19, 1945) is an American author of 30 books.

== Early life ==
Born in Long Beach, New York, Robinson is a graduate of Temple University in Philadelphia (1967). While still at school, he wrote for television and radio, including a weekly children's show, and was on the writing staff of The Mike Douglas Show, a nationally televised daily talk show. He continued working in the media during his four-year stint as an officer in the United States Air Force. Charged with running a press and public relations office for five generals at the height of the Vietnam War, he hosted a weekly talk show, scripted and directed several film projects, wrote short stories for national magazines and moonlighted as a disc jockey on local radio.

Following his military service, he moved to a small village in the south of France. From there, for the next 12 years, he travelled around the world as a freelance journalist, publishing more than 600 stories and articles. Then in 1982, he moved to the UK to concentrate on writing books. Twenty five years later, in 2007, he returned to New York.

His magazine credits include Playboy, McCalls, Barron's, Gourmet, Ambassador, True, Mademoiselle, Reader's Digest and TV Guide; his newspaper credits include The New York Times;The Washington Post, The San Francisco Examiner, The Christian Science Monitor and the International Herald Tribune. In Britain his feature journalism has appeared in The Times, The Sunday Times, The Sunday Telegraph, Independent on Sunday and The Mail on Sunday, among others. A more complete bibliography can be found here: https://jeffreyrobinson.com/complete-works

== Non-fiction ==
Considered "one of world's leading experts on international financial crime" Robinson wrote his 1995 investigative book, The Laundrymen, in which he uncovered the true extent of global money laundering. The book reveals how hundreds of billions of dirty dollars are derived mainly from the drug trade, then reinvested throughout the world by otherwise legitimate businessmen, lawyers, accountants and bankers. Business Week described it as "[a]n indictment of governments and banks".

Robinson scripted and hosted several television documentaries, including one for the BBC, and another for Arte in France and Germany. Both have been shown in the United States.

In 1998, he published a sequel to The Laundrymen, titled The Merger – How Organized Crime is Taking Over The World. In it, Robinson described the disturbing lengths that transnational organized criminals go in order to build multi-national corporations; explained why organized crime is the major beneficiary of globalization; and claimed that transnational organized criminals have become the most powerful special interest group on the planet.

Five years later he published another book in this series: The Sink, about crime, terrorism and dirty money.

Between 1986 and 1994, he published three biographies: Yamani – The Inside Story, about Saudi Arabia's former Minister of Oil Ahmed Zaki Yamani; Rainier & Grace, written about and with the cooperation of Monaco's sovereign family and reissued in 2014 as Grace of Monaco after the fictionalized 2014 French biopic of Grace Kelly's life; and Bardot – Two Lives, also written with the cooperation of Brigitte Bardot.

His other non-fiction titles include: The Risk Takers (his first UK best seller) which highlighted the high-fliers of City finance, recounting their tales of money, ego and power; The Minus Millionaires, a sequel to The Risk Takers, in which he wrote about ‘risk takers’ who had lost fortunes; The End of the American Century, for which Robinson gained access to secret archives in the former Soviet Union to reveal hidden agendas of the Cold War; The Hotel, stories gathered over five months as a fly on the wall in what is, arguably, the best hotel in the world; The Manipulators – A Conspiracy to Make Us Buy, exposing the marketing world's "hidden persuaders" 40 years after Vance Packard; and Prescription Games, an insider's view of the global pharmaceutical industry, where science and marketing are deliberately kept apart and where, all too often, profit dictates who lives and who dies.

In 2005, he wrote his first "as told to" with an old college friend, Joseph Petro: Petro's autobiography, Standing Next to History – An Agent's Life Inside the Secret Service. In 2007, Robinson co-authored Ronnie Wood's autobiography, documenting Wood's years as a rock star and member of the most famous band in the world, The Rolling Stones. In 2009, he published his third "as told to": Leading From The Front, co-written with British entrepreneur, Gerald Ronson.

His treatise on fraud, There's a Sucker Born Every Minute – A Revelation Of Audacious Frauds, Scams, And Cons – How To Spot Them, How To Stop Them was published in 2010.

The Takedown, subtitled "A Suburban Mom, A Coal Miner's Son and the Unlikely Demise of Colombia's Brutal Norte Valle Cartel", was released in August 2011.

== Fiction ==
Robinson has written six novels: Pietrov and Other Games; The Ginger Jar; The Margin of the Bulls; The Monk’s Disciples; A True and Perfect Knight (under film option); and Trump Tower.

== Radio and television ==
Robinson has appeared on NBC News, ABC News, CNN, Fox News, BBC Breakfast, BBC Newsnight, ITN, Channel 4 News, CBC, CNBC, Sky News, BBC World, NBC's The Today Show and Bloomberg Television. He has scripted and narrated various series for BBC Radio, including one on radio stars Amos and Andy, and one on American soap operas, "Tomorrow at the Same Time". He also wrote the BBC Scotland's Radio Three Drama of the Week, "Rossum’s Cyber Cafe", based on the Karel Čapek play "RUR".

He conceived and wrote the pilot for the British crime drama series, Tightrope, for Yorkshire Television. He also wrote the pilot episode for a new British series on financial crime called Follow The Money. Other television scripts include Sister Banjo and Notice of Claim. He wrote and presented a training film for financial investigators for the Metropolitan Police in London England titled "The Common Factor". He has scripted a film version of his biography of Brigitte Bardot, called Bardot; and a made-for-television movie version of Standing Next to History, a dramatic re-telling of the special relationship between the president of the United States (Ronald Reagan) and his Secret Service agent (Joseph Petro), called Ronnie & Joe.

Robinson won the 1990 Benedictine Award as "After-Dinner Speaker of the Year".

== Bibliography ==
=== Non-fiction ===
- BitCon – The Naked Truth About Bitcoin (Amazon original Kindle eBook) (2014) ISBN 978-1310329135
- The Takedown – A Suburban Mom, A Coal Miner's Son and the Unlikely Demise of Colombia's Brutal Norte Valle Cartel (2011) ISBN 9780312612382
- There's a Sucker Born Every Minute (2010) ISBN 9781410436535
- The Sink – Crime, Terror And Dirty Money in the Offshore World (2003) ISBN 9780771075841
- Prescription Games – Money, Ego and Power Inside the Global Pharmaceutical Industry (2001) ISBN 9780684858371
- The Merger – The Conglomeration of International Organized Crime (1998) ISBN 9781585670307
- The Manipulators – A Conspiracy to Make Us Buy (1997) ISBN 9780684817675
- The Hotel – Upstairs, Downstairs in a Secret World (1996) ISBN 9780684816913
- The Laundrymen (1995) ISBN 9781559703307
- Bardot – Two Lives (1994) ISBN 9781556114526
- The End of the American Century (1992) ISBN 9780684817743
- The Risk Takers – Five Years On (1991) ISBN 9780749304553
- Rainier & Grace (1988) Reissued in 2014 as Grace of Monaco ISBN 9781602862418
- Yamani – The Inside Story (1987) ISBN 9780671654818
- Minus Millionaires (1986) ISBN 9780043800263
- The Risk Takers – Portraits of Money, Ego and Power (1985) ISBN 9780046582531
- Teamwork – Comedy Teams in the Movies (1983) ISBN 9780862761073
- Bette Davis – A Filmography (1982) ISBN 9780862760229
- With Gerald Ronson: Leading from the Front – My Story (2009) ISBN 9781845965099
- With Ronnie Wood: Ronnie – The Autobiography (Life as a Rolling Stone) (2007) ISBN 9780312366520
- With Joseph Petro: Standing Next to History – An Agent's Life Inside the Secret Service (2005) ISBN 9780312332211

=== Fiction ===
- Trump Tower (2012) ISBN 978-1593157357
- A True and Perfect Knight (1999) ISBN 978-0316644723
- The Monk's Disciples (1997) ISBN 9780751521627
- The Margin of the Bulls (1995) ISBN 978-0751514407
- The Ginger Jar (1986) ISBN 9780708919057
- Pietrov and Other Games (1985) ISBN 978-0671631956

=== Screenplays, teleplays and radio plays ===
- I Je t'Aime You (2008)
- The Wake (short film) (2008)
- Other Arrangements (short film) (2007)
- The Confession (2007)
- Notice of Claim (2005)
- Bardot (2005)
- Sister Banjo (2002)
- Tightrope (2002) Yorkshire Television
- Rossum's Cyber Café BBC Radio 3 (2000)
- Amos and AndyBBC Radio 4 (1999)
- Same Time TomrorrowBBC Radio 4 (1999)
- Les Blanchisseurs (1998) Arte
- The Common Factor (1997) Metropolitan Police
- The Laundrymen (1997) BBC Television
