= Trump Tower (novel) =

2011 book by Jeffrey Robinson

Trump Tower: A Novel
- Original book cover
- Author: Jeffrey Robinson (originally credited to Donald Trump)
- Cover artist: Jeff Williams
- Language: English
- Genre: Crime fiction
- Set in: Trump Tower
- Published: 2011
- Publisher: Vanguard Press
- Publication place: United States
- Media type: Hardcover
- Pages: 416
- ISBN: 978-1593156435
- OCLC: 693810756
- Dewey Decimal: 813/.6
- LC Class: PS3620.R859 T78 2011
- Preceded by: Midas Touch (2011)
- Followed by: Time to Get Tough (2011)

Trump Tower is a work of fiction by Jeffrey Robinson, originally credited to Donald Trump, and billed as Trump's "debut novel" by the publisher. It was first published in 2011 by Vanguard Press. Trump had previously attempted to create a television series titled Trump Tower, modeled after Dallas, Dynasty, and Upstairs, Downstairs. He worked with MVP Entertainment, contracted a writer in Los Angeles, and successfully had Showtime Networks develop a television pilot. After receiving a payment for television rights to Trump Tower, he marketed the idea to Lifetime. The book by this title was developed in 2011 listing Trump, but when released in 2012 credited Robinson as sole author.

The plot of the book is set within a fictional version of Trump Tower, with Trump himself appearing as a character in the work. Detailed sex acts are depicted including BDSM and the rape of a woman. An employee of the building is described having sex on the set of The Celebrity Apprentice. The plot moves from erotica to murder mystery, and the building manager is initially a suspect before later being cleared. Bill Clinton and other celebrities appear in cameo appearances.

Esquire placed the work within the genre of erotic literature. A book review in the New York Post compared the storyline to the novel Fifty Shades of Grey (2011). Playground Magazine wrote that Trump Tower was itself a phallic object in the work. The Huffington Post called the book "incredibly sexist". Tango Magazine said it had high levels of sexual kinkiness. New York Magazine called it "a very very sexist novel". The Late Show with Stephen Colbert host Stephen Colbert discussed the book on his show.

== Plot synopsis ==
The novel is set within a fictional version of Trump Tower in New York City, New York. A fictionalized version of Donald Trump appears as a character in the novel. The Trump character is described in the novel as giving out details of his sex life to others, making hiring and firing decisions, and denigrating the mental status of tenants residing in his building. Trump Tower portrays the machinations of the love lives engaged in by both residents of the building, in addition to the employees who work inside of the facility.

Sex acts are depicted within the novel, including those displaying sexual kinkiness and bondage, dominance, submission, and sadomasochism. A worker in the book is depicted in a sex act occurring on the set of The Celebrity Apprentice inside of Trump Tower. Women appear in the book with detailed descriptions based on their perceived level of physical attractiveness. A rape of a woman is described in detail within the first chapter of the book.

After its initial foray into erotica within the first section of the work, the tale subsequently becomes a murder mystery. One of the main protagonists of the book is the building manager of Trump Tower, Pierre Belasco, who attempts to ensure stable operation of the facility. In Belasco's point of view, "Donald Trump only thinks he rules Trump Tower." He attempts to prove this throughout the work.

At the conclusion of the work, Trump appears and usurps power from the building manager. The building manager was a suspect in the murder mystery, and by the conclusion of the work, he is confirmed to have not been the killer. The novel features cameo appearances from fictional versions of celebrities, including Bill Clinton.

== Composition and publication ==
Trump and Robinson

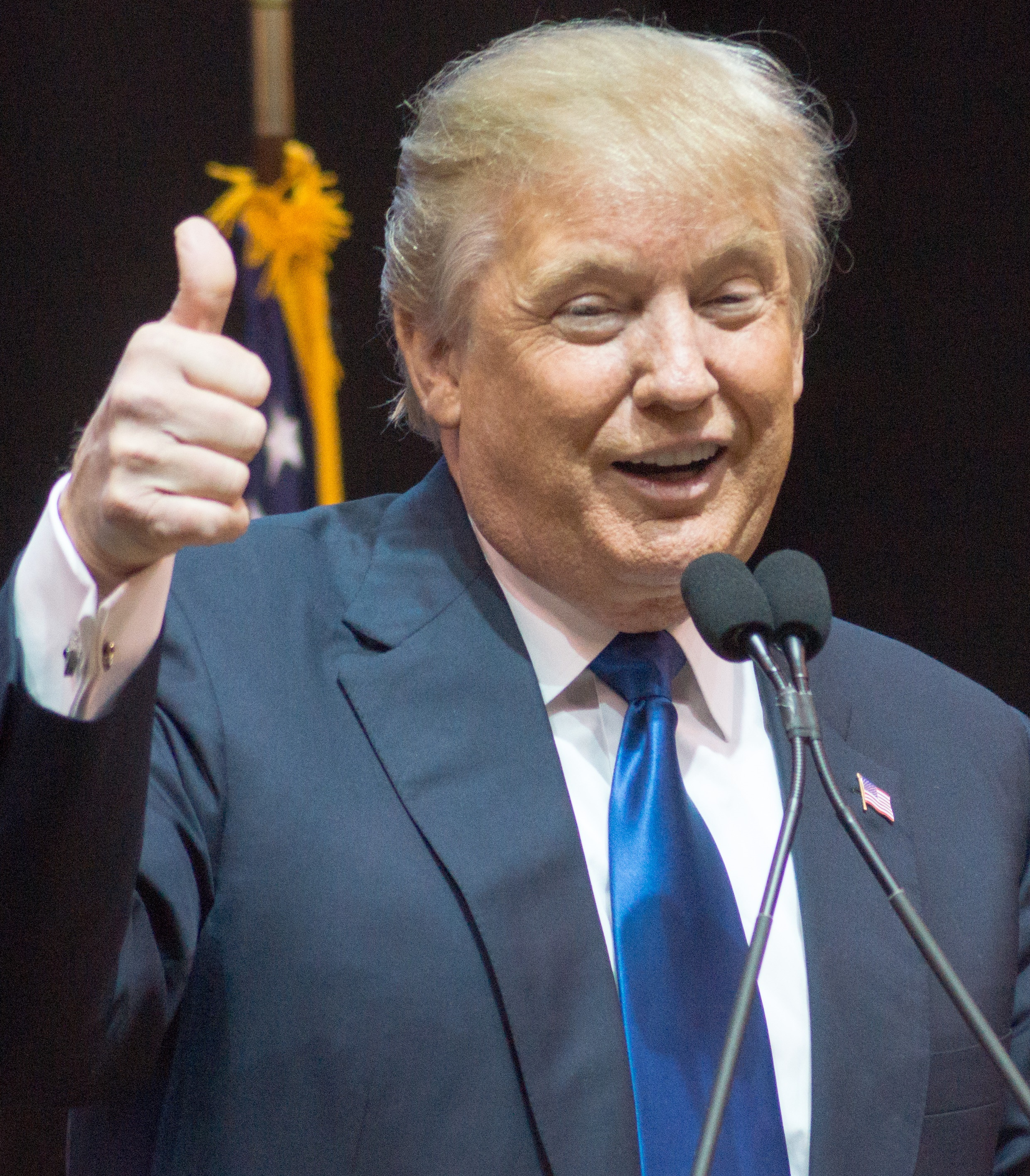
Donald Trump

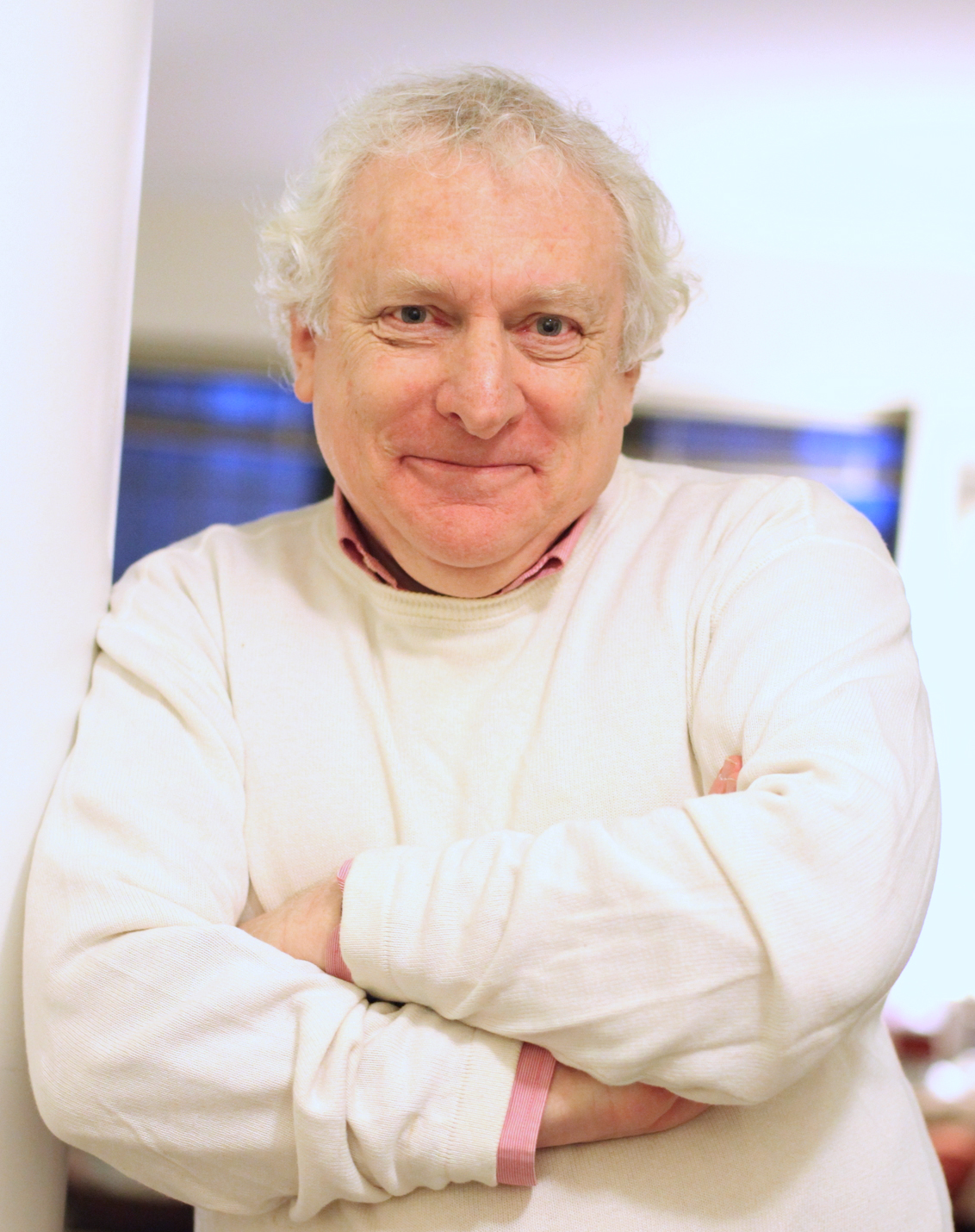
Jeffrey Robinson

Trump Tower was marketed by the publisher as the "debut novel" of Donald Trump, with ghostwriter Jeffrey Robinson.

Donald Trump initially attempted to produce a television series titled Trump Tower which would have been modeled after soap operas Dallas, Dynasty, and Upstairs, Downstairs. MVP Entertainment production company employee Bob Frederick worked with Trump and they contracted with a writer based in Los Angeles, California to write the plot of the potential television series. Trump pitched the idea to television networks in earnest during the period of the 1990s. Trump convinced Showtime Networks to create a television pilot episode, which did not further develop into a full television series. Trump received payment for television rights to the series at this point in time. After this setback, Trump next took his Trump Tower television show pitch in 2008 to the television network Lifetime. Trump was slated to be the narrator of the Lifetime version of the Trump Tower television series. The novel initially attributed to Trump, carried the same title and basic plot outline as his previously pitched television series.

The novel was first published in 2011 by Vanguard Press, attributed to Donald Trump as author and Jeffrey Robinson as ghostwriter. The original cover of the novel stated, "Donald J. Trump with Jeffrey Robinson". The book had the tagline: "The sexiest novel of the decade". It was originally advertised as the "debut novel" of Donald Trump. Marketing materials said the book was within the same vein as Hotel by Arthur Hailey. When the book was first given its initial International Standard Book Number, primary authorship was ascribed to Donald Trump. The novel was cataloged in the Library of Congress with Trump as the main author. Another edition attributed to Donald Trump was released the same year in audiobook format by Playaway Digital Audio. The cover designer of the work was Jeff Williams. Book vendors and librarians received marketing materials for the book in 2011 with its original cover featuring Trump as primary author, with Robinson's name appearing below Trump's. The literature purveyors subsequently received a notice that the original version of the work would not be sent out to them; instead they were sent a copy of the 2012 edition. Perseus Books Group, supervisor of Vanguard Press, told The Huffington Post when contacted that year, that the first published version of the title from 2011 was unavailable.

The novel was subsequently published in 2012 with Jeffrey Robinson credited as sole author. An ebook of the second version was published the same year. A review of the work by Trump was posted to the back of the 2012 edition of the book. Trump stated he was eager to see the novel adapted into a television series. Trump posted to Twitter in 2012 to promote the work, calling it a "must-read". The 2012 edition of the book was for sale in the Trump Tower gift shop in 2016. It was marketed in a display case in the Trump Store in Trump Tower alongside copies of other books authored by Trump.

== Reception ==
Writing for Esquire, Sarah Rense placed the novel within the genre of erotic literature. Fox News concurred, calling it an erotic novel. Jennifer Gould Keil of the New York Post commented, "Trump Tower is a fun read about the depths of degradation residents go to in order to live in the Midtown building". She compared the plot of the work to the novel Fifty Shades of Grey (2011). She wrote that its writing style was akin to a masculine take on Danielle Steel. Keil concluded the book had potential to be developed into a movie or television show. Playground Magazine journalist Xaime Martínez wrote that Trump Tower in the novel was a literary device used as a metaphor for a phallic object. The Huffington Post reporter Todd Van Luling called the book "incredibly sexist". Van Luling criticized the writing style of the book, pointing out "numerous typographical errors" and "abrupt tonal shifts".

Late-night talk show host Stephen Colbert discussed the novel on his television program The Late Show with Stephen Colbert, and commented upon the phallic role taken on by Trump Tower itself within the fictional work. Colbert commented a more appropriate title for Trump Tower would have been Symbolic Penis. Tango Magazine editor Rebecca Jane Stokes wrote that the novel exhibited significant amounts of sexual kinkiness. She echoed the comments of Jennifer Gould Keil and also compared the work's plot to Fifty Shades of Grey. Stokes criticized the work for appealing to a mainly male audience, "The book might present a kinky escape for the male of the species, but if you don't have a penis, this probably isn't the type of sexy story you're looking for." New York Magazine journalist Kaitlin Fontana called the work "a very very sexist novel". Fontana concluded, "Maybe you should skip Trump Tower, unless you're a sadomasochist (and not the fun kind)."
