= Jennifer Mercieca =

American rhetoric professor

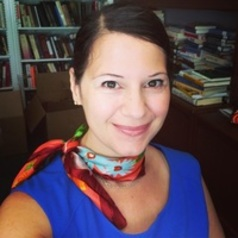
- Education: University of the Pacific; University of Illinois
- Scientific career
- Fields: Rhetoric; Communication
- Workplaces: Texas A&M University

Jennifer Mercieca is an American scholar of rhetoric. She is a professor of communication at Texas A&M University. She has written about the rhetorical style of Donald Trump, and the founding narratives that informed the political culture of the United States.

== Education and positions ==
Mercieca attended the University of the Pacific, where she earned a B.A. degree in Communication in 1995. She then continued to study there as a graduate student, earning an M.A. in Communication in 1997. In 2003, she obtained a PhD in speech communication at the University of Illinois.

In 2003, Mercieca joined the faculty in the Department of Communication at Texas A&M University. In 2009 she became an Associate Professor there. In 2015 she was a founder and briefly Acting Director of The Texas A&M Agora, and during 2016–2017 she was a Faculty Administrative Fellow in the College of Liberal Arts.

== Research ==
In 2010, Mercieca published Founding Fictions. The book argues that the political philosophy of the early United States can be understood as a type of meta-narrative that generates the stories that individuals use to inform their views of their role in society. She analyzes the way that the founding stories of the United States, which informed its governing documents and its public discourse, informed Americans' views of themselves and their roles in society between 1776 and 1845. She argues that the narratives that were constructed in American public discourse reveal a fundamental tension between the two goals of having a stable republic and having an active citizenry.

In 2020, Mercieca published a second book, called Demagogue for President: The Rhetorical Genius of Donald Trump. In Demagogue for President, Mercieca argues that Donald Trump campaigned for president successfully by employing classic rhetorical tricks that have historically been effectively employed by a variety of demagogues. She argues that Trump's language can be classified into six distinct rhetorical patterns, of which three are employed to divide his opponents and three are used to unite his supporters. For example, she argues that Trump is deliberately vague or transgressive in certain situations because these can be useful traits of persuasive messaging, and that there is historical precedent for rhetoricians to use these tools. However, she also argues that, while these rhetorical devices can be highly effective and are employed for specific strategic purposes, they also have identifiable limitations in their capacity to persuade people. Demagogue for President was included on Literary Hub's summer 2020 list of "The Best New Books to Read This Summer", as well as its "Most Anticipated Books of 2020".

In 2021, Mercieca was offered literary representation by Allison Devereux of The Cheney Agency for her next book, on propaganda. Mercieca's expert testimony was requested by a researcher from the United States House Select Committee on the January 6 Attack in 2022. The 28-page statement by Mercieca, submitted to the committee in March, outlines Trump's history of using rhetoric in "anti-democratic ways".

== Selected works ==
- Founding Fictions. University of Alabama Press, 2010. ISBN 978-0-8173-8355-8
- With Justin S. Vaughn, The Rhetoric of Heroic Expectations: Establishing the Obama Presidency. Texas A & M University Press, 2014. ISBN 978-1-62349-043-0
- Demagogue for President: The Rhetorical Genius of Donald Trump. Texas A&M University Press, 2020. ISBN 978-1-6234-9906-8

== Awards ==
- Professional and Scholarly Excellence (PROSE) award
