= Damian Paletta =

American journalist

- Education: Boston College, University of Missouri
- Occupations: Washington bureau chief, Journalist
- Years active: 2002-present
- Employer: The Wall Street Journal

Damian Paletta is an American journalist who is the Washington bureau chief for The Wall Street Journal. He was previously a reporter and editor at the Washington Post and a White House correspondent for The Wall Street Journal.

== Education ==
Paletta received a B.A. from Boston College in 1999. He completed a M.S. in journalism at the University of Missouri in 2002.

== Career ==
Paletta started at The Wall Street Journal as a reporter covering the 2008 financial crisis. In 2011, Paletta won the Washington Reporting Raymond Clapper Award and the Sigma Delta Chi award for Washington correspondence.

After the 2016 presidential election, Paletta was named a White House correspondent covering the new Trump administration for The Journal, until he joined The Post in 2017 again as a White House reporter but this time focusing on economic policy.

Paletta was appointed senior economics correspondent before being named economics editor in 2019. He has appeared on WNYC, C-SPAN and MSNBC.

Paletta returned to the Wall Street Journal as its Washington bureau chief in February 2024.

== Works ==
- Abutaleb, Yasmeen; Paletta, Damian (2021-06-29). Nightmare Scenario: Inside the Trump Administration's Response to the Pandemic That Changed History. HarperCollins. ISBN 978-0-06-306607-6. OCLC 1225066847.
