= Trump: The Art of the Comeback =

1997 book by Donald Trump and Kate Bohner

- Authors: Donald Trump; Kate Bohner
- Language: English
- Subject: Business
- Publisher: Times Books
- Publication date: October 31, 1997
- Publication place: United States
- Media type: Print (hardcover and paperback)
- Pages: 244
- ISBN: 978-0812929645
- Preceded by: Trump: Surviving at the Top (1990)
- Followed by: The America We Deserve (2000)

Trump: The Art of the Comeback is a 1997 book credited to businessman Donald Trump and journalist Kate Bohner.

In November 1997, it was reported that Bohner was in fact the book's ghostwriter.

== Synopsis ==
In the book, Donald Trump writes about his bankruptcy in 1990 and how he managed to "comeback" through negotiations. In the book, he notably revealed that he was "a germ freak" and "often thought of taking out a series of newspaper ads encouraging the abolishment of the handshake." Trump also explains why he divorced Ivana Trump and Marla Maples, his first two wives; he claims that Ivana Trump talked too much about work while Marla Maples wanted him to return earlier. Trump's accounts were denied by both ex-wives. Trump also criticizes journalist Tina Brown, saying that she reneged on a promise to write favorably about him in the past. Trump called Brown "the worst," stating, "She's totally overrated. I think she's third-rate at best. If you look at Vanity Fair, it's a better magazine today than when she ran it." Brown was also the wife of Harold Evans, who was the president of Random House at the time. Trump also lists the "problems" he had with Alicia Machado, the winner of Miss Universe in 1996, including her weight gain and her criticism of Trump in an interview with The Washington Post.

The book offers ten tips for success:

1. PLAY GOLF
2. STAY FOCUSED
3. BE PARANOID
4. BE PASSIONATE
5. GO AGAINST THE TIDE
6. GO WITH YOUR GUT
7. WORK WITH PEOPLE YOU LIKE
8. BE LUCKY
9. GET EVEN
10. ALWAYS HAVE A PRENUPTIAL AGREEMENT

== Writing ==
After the release of Trump's 1990 book, Trump: Surviving at the Top, he said that his next book "will be the real story, describing my comeback and the success of it all." Trump said he would write the book "in a couple of years." Peter Osnos, the editor for Surviving at the Top, said, "If Donald's career unfolds the way he is determined it will, his next book will make a great story." Trump said he was asked by Random House to write The Art of the Comeback, his third book, after the company was impressed by his emergence from bankruptcy. According to Trump's niece, Mary L. Trump, he briefly hired her as a ghostwriter for this book, but gave her little information to work with and eventually removed her from the project.

On August 1, 1997, eight hours before the deadline, the final draft of the book was turned in. Kate Bohner's life as Trump's ghostwriter was documented by her friend, Candace Bushnell of The New York Observer. While writing for Trump, Bohner was nicknamed "Kateso". Bushnell's documentation of Bohner's ghostwriting of the book would be published in the November 3, 1997 edition of the Observer.

== Reception ==
Fred Andrews of The New York Times wrote "The man combines imagination with muscle. If only he could keep his mouth shut" and noted that "Trump is forever saying the obvious, as though his perceptions were original or important." Meanwhile, Craig Offman of Salon noted that Trump "admits he suffers from an even greater political liability: honesty."
