= Yasmeen Abutaleb =

American author

- Education: University of Maryland, College Park
- Occupation: Health Policy Reporter
- Years active: 2014-present
- Employer: The Washington Post

Yasmeen Abutaleb is a New York Times best selling author and journalist who is a reporter for Thomson Reuters.

== Education ==
Abutaleb graduated from Walt Whitman High School in Bethesda, Maryland in 2010, where she first learned about journalism on their newspaper, the Black and White.

Abutaleb received a B.S. in microbiology and a B.A. in journalism from University of Maryland in 2014. She served as the editor-in-chief of the school's newspaper, The Diamondback from 2012-2013.

== Career ==
Abutaleb started her career covering health care for Reuters, focusing on the Affordable Care Act, drug pricing and federal health programs.

In 2016, she was one of three lead reporters on a five-part investigative series detailing the rising threat of antibiotic-resistant infections.

She joined The Washington Post in 2019 as a national reporter covering health policy. She focuses on the Department of Health and Human Services and health care in politics.

Throughout her career, Abutaleb has reported on the opioid crisis, changes to Medicaid and how politics influence health policies.

She has appeared on Washington Week, C-SPAN and MSNBC.

== Works ==
In June 2021, Abutaleb and Damian Paletta co-authored “Nightmare Scenario: Inside the Trump Administration’s Response to the Pandemic That Changed History,” a book detailing the Trump administration's response to the COVID-19 pandemic in America.

The book most notably reveals that President Trump considered displacing infected passengers from the Diamond Princess cruise ship at Guantánamo Bay, and that the severity of President Trump's coronavirus infection was far worse than he originally let on.
