= TrumpNation =

Book by Timothy L. O'Brien

TrumpNation: The Art of Being the Donald
- Book cover (2005 edition)
- Author: Timothy L. O'Brien
- Language: English
- Subject: Donald Trump
- Publisher: Warner Books
- Publication date: October 26, 2005
- Publication place: United States
- Media type: Print
- Pages: 288
- ISBN: 0446578541 Hardcover
- OCLC: 936685002

TrumpNation: The Art of Being the Donald is a 2005 biographical book about Donald Trump that was written by Timothy L. O'Brien and published by Warner Books. After the book was published, Trump filed a $5 billion lawsuit against O'Brien, who had written that Trump was not a billionaire and that his net worth actually ranged between $150 million and $250 million. Trump sought $2.5 billion in compensatory damages and an additional $2.5 billion in punitive damages. The lawsuit was dismissed in 2009, and an appeals court affirmed the decision in 2011.

== Background ==
At the time of the book's publication, Timothy L. O'Brien was a reporter for The New York Times, and had reported on Donald Trump's businesses since 1990. O'Brien interviewed Trump for the book, and said that Trump enjoyed his presence, despite O'Brien's claim that Trump once referred to him as a "total whack job". Trump said that he cooperated with O'Brien because, "It's almost like a competitive thing with me. I almost want to see if you can get Trump." O'Brien also interviewed contestants from Trump's reality television series, The Apprentice, as well as Trump's second wife, Marla Maples, casino owner Steve Wynn, who was Trump's longtime business rival (and later friend), as well as former New York City mayor Ed Koch, who was Trump's first political rival.

Trump allowed O'Brien to visit his offices to research his financial records. According to O'Brien, the financial documents were of no help for determining Trump's net worth. O'Brien spoke with three people who worked with Trump for years and who believed his net worth to be between $150 million and $250 million. O'Brien said he was told by Trump, "You can go ahead and speak to guys who have 400-pound wives at home who are jealous of me, but the guys who really know me know I'm a great builder."

== Summary ==
TrumpNation: The Art of Being the Donald is divided into chapters, each one presented out of chronological order and devoted to a part of Trump's personal and professional life. Personal chapters include "TrumpRoots" and "TrumpStyle", while professional chapters include "TrumpLand" and "TrumpBroke". Each chapter ends with sarcastic "TrumpQuizzes" that educate the reader on how to become a billionaire. Included in the book are disputes that Trump—early in his business career—had with New York City mayor Ed Koch. Trump's business dealings with associates of the American Mafia, as well as a bailout by his siblings that prevented him from going bankrupt, are also included in the book.

O'Brien, citing three anonymous people who worked with Trump, wrote in the book that Trump "was not remotely close to being a billionaire", stating that his actual net worth ranged between $150 million and $250 million. O'Brien also wrote that Trump was "bored" with Marla Maples at the time of their marriage: "I was bored when she was walking down the aisle. I kept thinking, 'What the hell am I doing here?'" O'Brien also stated that Trump was once asked by boxer Mike Tyson if he had an affair with his wife, Robin Givens. O'Brien quoted Trump: "He said, 'Could I ask you, Are you fucking my wife?' Now, if I froze, I'm dead ... You would have zero chance. Here's the heavyweight champion of the world, and he's a solid piece of fucking armor."

== Publication and sales ==
TrumpNation: The Art of Being the Donald was published by Warner Books on October 26, 2005. Sales increased after Trump's lawsuit was filed against O'Brien. On Amazon.com, the book's sales ranking went from 123,329 to 466. However, O'Brien later said in March 2016 that the book "didn't sell particularly well". Trump took some credit for the low sales, stating, "I didn't read the book. I didn't have time to read it. What I did do was make sure people knew it was false."

A new edition of TrumpNation was published by Grand Central Publishing (formerly Warner Books) on June 14, 2016. The 2016 edition included a new introduction by O'Brien that criticized Trump and made note of his 2016 presidential campaign.

== Reception ==
Michelle Archer of USA Today criticized the book's chapters for not being presented in chronological order: "Compartmentalizing Trump's endless endeavors—from real estate to casinos to TV—makes sense, but it muddies the timeline of the rise and fall of Trump's fortune." Jose Lambient of The Palm Beach Post wrote, "Sarcastic at times, hilarious and irreverent at others, the book demystifies the star of The Apprentice as the poor man's rich man and portrays him as a potty-mouthed P. T. Barnum with a bad comb-over."

Publishers Weekly wrote, "Sometimes hilarious quizzes summarizing the main points of each chapter demonstrate Trump's audacity, itinerant poor judgment and the kind of hubris one can only stand back and watch with astonishment and a sort of clandestine admiration. O'Brien chronicles Trump's rise, fall and rise again from both public favor and the Forbes rich list, and deftly balances irreverence and respect for his subject. […] O'Brien's reportorial style, peppered with wit and irony, is the perfect base to Trump's acidic persona; he is the straight man to this contemporary P.T. Barnum."

Kirkus Reviews called the book, "A bemused, entertaining portrait of a gold-toned incarnation of the American dream, plus some believable financials for anyone who wants to know the real fiscal story", while stating that, "O'Brien gets down and dirty—in the most good-natured way—to craft a myth-busting biography of the real-estate developer." Kirkus Reviews noted that "it is surprising" that Trump "appears to have cooperated with the author, despite having declared O'Brien a 'whack job' to the press."

== Trump's response ==
On October 26, 2005, Trump appeared on the news program Extra and said: "The book is not a very good book ... Tim's not a very good writer." In reference to O'Brien's claim that Trump was "bored" with Maples at the time of their marriage, Trump said, "Marla is a nice woman, and they should just leave her alone." Responding to O'Brien's claim that Trump had an affair with Robin Givens, Trump said, "Well, you'd have to ask Robin about that, but it is not true".

In November 2005, Trump said that O'Brien "writes like an infantile". That month, Trump's attorney, Marc Kasowitz, sent Warner Books a letter which demanded a complete recall of the book's copies, as well as a public correction and an apology. Kasowitz wrote: "This book ... contains out-and-out defamatory falsehoods concerning Mr. Trump, his business and his family. We demand ... that Warner immediately cease and desist further publishing and disseminating this book." Warner Books' vice president, Rick Wolff, said: "We have every confidence in Tim O'Brien—he's one of the nation's leading business investigative journalists, and we firmly believe in Tim's research for this book."

O'Brien held a book signing event in New York on December 12, 2005. According to a witness, Kasowitz approached O'Brien's signing table and quietly told him to stop promoting the book or else "we're going to get you". Kasowitz declined to comment when asked if he was at O'Brien's book signing, and denied that he made such a statement to anybody.

=== Lawsuit ===
On January 23, 2006, Trump filed a $5 billion lawsuit in a New Jersey state court against O'Brien and Warner Books for the book's claim that Trump was not a billionaire. Trump said he was worth at least $2.7 billion at the time, and sought $2.5 billion in compensatory damages and an additional $2.5 billion in punitive damages.

Trump called the book "terribly written" and said, "Rather than sitting back and letting false statements be published without challenge, I believe it is important to expose irresponsible, malicious and false reporting. The writer and publisher of this book knew full well that their statements were false and malicious, but in hopes of generating book sales, they did not care. In so doing, they exposed themselves to this lawsuit." Trump's attorneys stated: "The obvious purpose of that malicious scheme and those vile statements is to embarrass Trump, to damage him in his business and professional dealings and to create publicity in order to increase sales of O'Brien's newly released book." Trump's attorneys also alleged that O'Brien spent a three-hour visit at Trump's office attempting to pressure one of Trump's lawyers into going on a date with him, rather than researching Trump's finances.

Warner Books' spokesperson, Rob Nissen, said O'Brien is a "veteran business reporter with the New York Times and his work, as does his book, 'TrumpNation,' speak for themselves." Nissen further stated that Trump willingly and extensively aided O'Brien in his research for the book, and that O'Brien was willing to meet with Trump at any time to discuss the project. Martin Garbus, a First Amendment expert who was not involved with the case, said, "I think the book is totally protected. Trump would have to prove both deliberate falsity and that he lost something as a result of that falsity. I don't think he can do that."

During depositions for the case, Trump told attorneys in December 2007, "My net worth fluctuates, and it goes up and down with markets and with attitudes and with feelings, even my own feelings." Trump clarified, "Yes, even my own feelings as to where the world is, where the world is going, and that can change rapidly from day to day. Then you have a September 11th, and you don't feel so good about yourself and you don't feel so good about the world and you don't feel so good about New York City. Then you have a year later, and the city is as hot as a pistol. Even months after that it was a different feeling. So yeah, even my own feelings affect my value to myself."

Also during depositions, O'Brien's attorney, Andrew Ceresney, asked Trump about earlier claims made in two ghostwritten books credited to him – How to Get Rich (2004) and Trump 101: The Way to Success (2006) – which stated that he was $9.2 billion in debt during the early 1990s. Trump stated that the number was a mistake made by ghostwriter Meredith McIver, and that he was unaware of the exact number, but preferred to say "billions". Trump had previously said in 1997, "I owed the banks as much as $9 billion". The Washington Post later wrote, "It appeared that Trump had exaggerated the lows, to make his comeback seem even more impressive."

On May 18, 2009, O'Brien and his attorneys requested that the lawsuit be dismissed, stating that the book did not slander or damage Trump's brand name. William Tambussi, Trump's attorney, said that O'Brien damaged Trump by referring to him as a "faux millionaire", a "train wreck", "the walking embodiment of financial pornography" and a "serial bankruptcy addict". Ceresney said that O'Brien made such statements during radio interviews and at book signings, which he said were "intimate settings" that did not damage Trump's reputation.

The lawsuit was dismissed by judge Michele M. Fox on July 15, 2009. O'Brien said, "I'm deeply grateful that the court's decision has vindicated the reporting in 'TrumpNation,'" while Trump said, in regard to his net worth, "We've proven our case. When you're worth over $5 billion or $6 billion and you've proven that, you still have to prove malice. The libel laws are very bad." The trial had been scheduled to begin on October 13, 2009. Trump appealed the decision to dismiss the lawsuit, but an appeals court affirmed the decision in September 2011. The case was dismissed based on a lack of malice and that dismissal was upheld because it was not enough to prove the claims were false, actual malice requires proving that O'Brien was aware the claims were false. The appeals court noted, "Nothing suggests that O'Brien was subjectively aware of the falsity of his source's figures or that he had actual doubts as to the information's accuracy."

==== Aftermath ====
In March 2013, Trump said about the lawsuit: "Essentially the judge just said 'Trump is too famous. He's so famous that you're allowed to say anything you want about him.' Well, I disagree with that." In July 2015, O'Brien, who was now working for Bloomberg View, wrote a column titled "Dear Mr. Trump: I'm Worth $10 Billion, Too", in which he exaggerated the value of his belongings in the same way as Trump.

In March 2016, O'Brien noted that only a few pages of the book revolved around Trump's net worth. O'Brien said that Trump's offense toward the net-worth claim was "a measure of his deep insecurity. His wealth and the size of his wealth ... are integral to how he wants people to perceive him." That month, Trump told The Washington Post, "I spent a couple of bucks on legal fees, and they spent a whole lot more. I did it to make his life miserable, which I'm happy about." Later that year, Trump said TrumpNation "was a zero book. That was a zero. That was total fiction."

== See also ==
- Bibliography of Donald Trump
- Personal and business legal affairs of Donald Trump
