= Cohen v. Trump =

Cohen v. Trump may refer to:

- Cohen v. Trump (Trump University), a class action lawsuit filed by Art Cohen regarding allegations of fraud committed by Trump in his Trump University business
- Cohen v. Trump (legal fees), a lawsuit filed by a former personal lawyer for Donald Trump over legal fees that Cohen felt he was owed
