= Trial of Donald Trump =

Trial of Donald Trump may refer to these legal cases against Donald Trump in his personal capacity, some of which led to a trial:

== Criminal prosecutions ==
=== Trump convicted ===
- Prosecution of Donald Trump in New York, a criminal trial held April 15–May 30, 2024. Trump was found guilty on 34 counts related to falsifying business records to cover up hush money payments to pornographic film actress Stormy Daniels. He received an unconditional discharge.

=== Case dismissed ===
- Federal prosecution of Donald Trump (classified documents case), a dismissed case on 40 charges of mishandling classified documents after Trump's presidency.
- Federal prosecution of Donald Trump (election obstruction case) a dismissed case on 4 conspiracy and obstruction charges, including for his involvement in the January 6 U.S. Capitol attack. It had been delayed by Trump v. United States (2024), in which the U.S. Supreme Court ruled that former presidents have some immunity from criminal prosecution for acts considered "official".
- Georgia election racketeering prosecution, a dismissed case on 10 charges (originally 13) regarding electoral decertification attempts. The court removed Fulton County district attorney Fani Willis from the case. Pete Skandalakis appointed himself as the new prosecutor and dropped all charges.

== Impeachment trials ==
- First impeachment trial of Donald Trump, 2020, acquitted on abuse of power and obstruction of Congress
- Second impeachment trial of Donald Trump, 2021, acquitted on incitement to insurrection

== Notable civil lawsuits ==
- 2024 presidential eligibility of Donald Trump, encompassing a number of state and federal civil proceedings, with all of them either dismissed or overturned
  - Trump v. Anderson, 2024, in which the U.S. Supreme Court ruled that Congress determines ballot eligibility for federal officeholders
- E. Jean Carroll v. Trump, 2019–2024, a concluded suit regarding sexual assault and defamation
- New York v. Trump et al, 2019–2024, a concluded suit regarding fraudulently misrepresenting the value of real estate
- Thompson v. Trump, aka Lee v. Trump, 2021–present, ongoing suit alleging responsibility for the January 6 United States Capitol attack

== See also ==
- Federal prosecution of Donald Trump (disambiguation)
- Legal affairs of the first Donald Trump presidency
- Legal affairs of the second Donald Trump presidency
- Personal and business legal affairs of Donald Trump
- Post-election lawsuits related to the 2020 U.S. presidential election
- Trump v. United States
