= Legal affairs of Donald Trump =

Legal affairs of Donald Trump may refer to:

- Personal and business legal affairs of Donald Trump
- Legal affairs of the first Trump presidency
- Legal affairs of the second Trump presidency

== See also ==
- Federal prosecution of Donald Trump (disambiguation)
