= Trump 101 =

2006 book by Donald Trump and Meredith McIver

- Book cover
- Author: Donald Trump (credited); Meredith McIver (ghostwriter)
- Audio read by: Alan Sklar
- Language: English
- Subject: Business
- Publisher: Wiley
- Publication date: 2006
- Publication place: United States
- Media type: Print (hardcover)
- Pages: 208
- ISBN: 978-0-470-04710-1
- OCLC: 803033282
- Website: Official website

Trump 101: The Way to Success is a book credited to Donald Trump and written by ghostwriter Meredith McIver. The first edition was published in hardcover format by Wiley in 2006. The book contains twenty-four chapters imparting advice on business acumen with quotations included from Trump. The authors caution the reader about the inherent risks seen in business deals, and advise individuals to promptly deal with conflicts. Trump recommends other books including The Art of War and The Power of Positive Thinking, as well as his company Trump University.

Trump discussed the writing process for Trump 101 in a deposition during his lawsuit against The New York Times journalist Timothy O'Brien regarding his work about Trump, TrumpNation. When questioned under oath by a lawyer, Trump asserted he had been unaware of mistakes his ghostwriter made about his debt in Trump 101, because he had read the book "very quickly" before publication.

Booklist acknowledged the work served a public relations function for Trump, and concluded it contained some useful advice. Other reviews pointed out quotes from the book which were seen as sexist.

== Contents ==
Trump 101: The Way to Success is a book imparting advice and motivation about Trump's business acumen. The book is split into approximately twenty sets of aspirational genres, including: advising the reader to strive to better themselves, recognizing the right business opportunities when they come along, trying new things, the art of negotiation, how to gain wisdom from one's intuition, learning from failures, maintaining a sense of motivation, keeping lofty goals, and dropping efforts which do not give one passion. The authors caution about the element of risk during investing, "Frequently, the risk will be well worth the gamble, but sometimes it will be more than you can afford". The book advises to deal with conflict prior to issues developing into larger problems. Readers are told they should practice taking onus for oneself for difficulties quickly after they ensue. The work criticizes those who constantly blame others for their problems.

Trump 101 recommends the reader gain wisdom from other books including writings from Albert Einstein and Ralph Waldo Emerson, The Art of War by Sun Tzu, Norman Vincent Peale's The Power of Positive Thinking, The Last Lion: Winston Spencer Churchill by William Manchester, and Trump's own autobiography. The book suggests individuals describe their thoughts to others during business dealings in a clear and cogent manner. Trump's views of attractiveness are quoted in the book, and he expounds on various types of beauty, saying, "Beauty and elegance, whether in a woman, a building, or a work of art, is not just superficial or something pretty to see." Trump is also quoted in the book saying he is skilled at predictions of where the real estate market is going. Trump defends his desire to give individuals an education to improve their lives and touts his company Trump University.

== Composition and publication ==
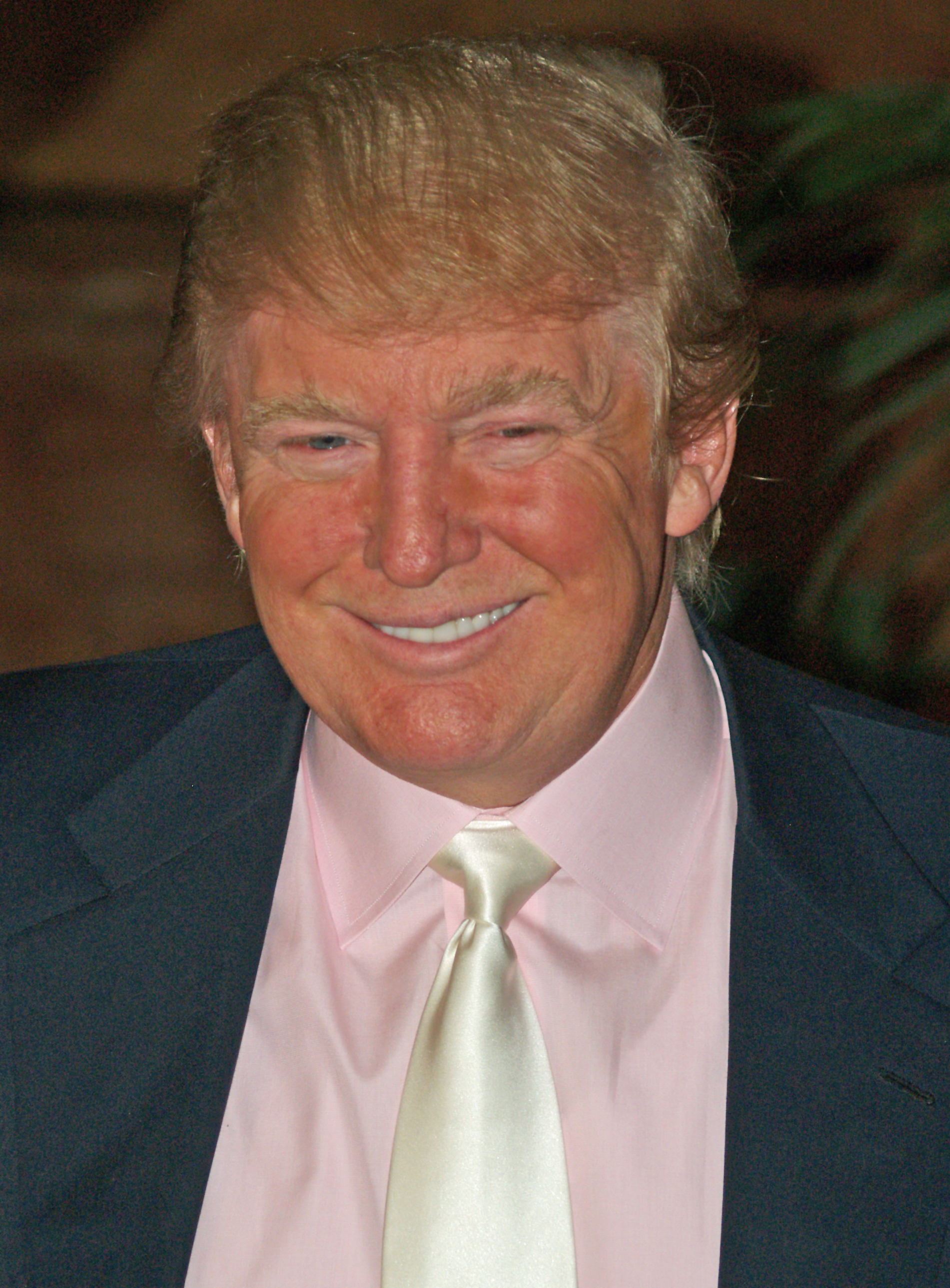
Donald Trump in 2008

Meredith McIver was the ghostwriter on Trump 101 and other books credited to Trump; she was described by the Trump Organization as "an in-house staff writer" for the company. McIver worked with Trump on writing content for Trump University. Trump University subsequently held the copyrights to Trump 101: The Way to Success. Other books credited to Trump and written by McIver include Trump: How to Get Rich (2004), Trump: Think Like a Billionaire (2005), Trump Never Give Up (2008), and Think Like a Champion (2009). In a 2007 lawsuit against The New York Times journalist Timothy O'Brien regarding his work about Trump, TrumpNation, Trump discussed the ghostwriting aspect of Trump 101 and How to Get Rich. During a deposition as part of the lawsuit Trump brought, he placed the fault with McIver for mistakes in both books. Trump asserted that the book's figure of his debt, $9 billion, was inaccurate, and that he was unaware of the matter after reading the book McIver presented to him, admitting: "I read it very quickly. I didn't see it. I would have corrected it, but I didn't see it." Trump said to the questioning lawyer, that he told McIver about the mistake she wrote in the book published under his name: "I told the book writer about it, and she obviously put it in again. She probably forgot. I would love you to question her about it."

The book was first published in hardcover format in 2006 by Wiley. An audiobook was released in 2006 by Tantor Media, read by voice actor Alan Sklar. Wiley published the book again in print and in e-book format in 2007. Additional language editions were published in 2007 including Chinese, Turkish, Italian, Korean, and Japanese. The audiobook was again released in 2008. An additional version of the audiobook was released in 2010. The book was published in Polish in 2017. In 2016, Trump reported earnings of less than US$200.00 from the book.

== Reception ==
Writing for Booklist, Mary Whaley characterized the book as "clearly a high-profile public-relations effort". Whaley acknowledged, "Trump's insight and business principles offer valuable lessons." Bustle wrote critically of Trump's views on women espoused in quotations in the book, placing a quote from the book at spot number one among a list of quotes the publication deemed sexist uttered by the individual, In another article for Bustle, Kendyl Kearly wrote of the same quote, "[Trump] made it clear that women have a dollar amount just like a fine Renoir or constructing Trump Towers. He probably wants to put the pageant winners in the bank or in a museum." Another quote from the book is listed as second by Nina Bahadur of HuffPost on a list of "outrageous things Trump has said about women".
