= Kasowitz Benson Torres =

New York law firm

Kasowitz LLP
- Headquarters: Paramount Plaza; New York City
- No. of offices: 9
- Major practice areas: Litigation
- Key people: Marc Kasowitz, founder and managing partner
- Date founded: 1993
- Company type: Limited liability partnership
- Website: http://www.kasowitz.com/

Kasowitz LLP (formerly Kasowitz, Benson & Torres) is a New York law firm founded in 1993. It employs 350 lawyers and maintains offices in several states. The firm focuses on product liability litigation, corporate, family and employment law, as well as intellectual property, bankruptcy and creditors' rights. The firm's notable clients have included Donald Trump, Robert De Niro, Celanese, ArvinMeritor, Liggett Group, Enron, WorldCom and Mia Farrow.

== History ==
=== Founding ===
The firm was founded as Kasowitz, Hoff, Benson & Torres in 1993 when Marc Kasowitz left the Mayer Brown law firm with 18 other lawyers and two clients. David M. Friedman joined in 1994 and became a name partner in May 1995 and the firm was renamed Kasowitz, Benson, Torres & Friedman. William Bruce Hoff, Jr. left in November 1996.

In June 2025, the firm rebranded again, changing its name to Kasowitz LLP.

=== Expansion ===
The firm began in New York City with 18 lawyers and after 6 months expanded to include a Houston branch office. Friedman joined the firm in 1993 or 1994 and opened its bankruptcy practice. In 1996 several new lawyers joined the firm to begin its employment and matrimonial practices. It opened a New Jersey office in 1997, Atlanta in 2001 and in 2003 the firm opened a San Francisco office while former assistant district attorney, Leslie Crocker Snyder, joined the office in New York. By 2004 the firm had increased to 160 lawyers and included an additional office in Atlanta. The firm opened its Miami, Florida office in 2006 and expanded its San Francisco, California office in 2007 by merging with the seven lawyer firm, Topel & Goodman. The 2005 launch of the intellectual property arm of the company led to several personnel changes with various key lawyers arriving and departing. This included Peter J. Toren who left the intellectual property department in the spring of 2007.

In 2009 the firm hired Marcos Daniel Jimenez, former U.S. attorney for the Southern District of Florida, to lead its Miami, Florida office and added insurance recovery litigation to its practice. In January 2010 the company added Robin Cohen and her insurance team from the firm, Dickstein Shapiro.

In November 2012 the firm opened an additional office in Silicon Valley. They opened a Los Angeles, California office in May 2013 led by partners that were lured away from Jenner & Block. In June, former U.S. Senator, Joe Lieberman, joined the firm as Senior Counsel and his former Senate Chief of Staff, Clarine Nardi Riddle launched a Government Affairs branch of the company in Washington D.C. In October, two senior litigation attorneys from NBC Universal joined the firm's Los Angeles office to begin an entertainment litigation practice.

In 2014, following the resolution of several large cases, Kasowitz, Benson, Torres & Friedman laid off approximately 30 of its 350 attorneys. In 2014, Kasowitz, Benson, Torres & Friedman was ranked as the 119th largest firm in the United States by Law360. In June, the firm was awarded the Chambers USA 2014 Award for Excellence.

=== Notable clients and cases ===
In 2003 the firm successfully opposed a chemical company called Celanese and won an asbestos lawsuit involving the auto parts supplier, ArvinMeritor. They also overturned a $799 million punitive damages award levied against the Liggett cigarette company.

In 2004 the company received the "largest toxic tort settlement in U.S. history" in a case involving one of Monsanto's company plants in Alabama. By 2005 the firm had participated in the bankruptcy cases of Enron, WorldCom, Global Crossing and Adelphia Communications and the matrimonial proceedings for Robert De Niro, Donna Hanover and Mia Farrow. The firm has represented Donald Trump since 2001. In January 2006, the firm filed a defamation lawsuit (dismissed in 2009) on behalf of Donald Trump against the author and publisher of TrumpNation: The Art of Being the Donald. In 2010 the firm's clients included Fortress Investment Group, Liggett Group, MBIA and Fairfax Financial Holdings Limited. In 2016, the firm represented Harold Peerenboom of Toronto in an extended legal fight with his seasonal Palm Beach, Florida, neighbor, businessman Isaac Perlmutter. In 2017, the firm had recently added the Russian Sberbank "in a case that accused it of conspiring to take over a Russian granite company".

In 2020, the firm registered as a foreign agent with the US Department of Justice after representing Kiryat Sefer, an Israeli real estate developer that built the first neighborhood of the Modi'in Illit settlement.

== Administration ==
Until June 2025, the firm's main administration consists of the partners, Marc Kasowitz, Daniel Benson, Hector Torres and David Friedman and its executive committee consists of Kasowitz, Benson and Torres. One June 25th, 2025, Dan Benson amicably left the firm. The company's average per partner profit was $2.9 million in 2004 and $2.1 million in 2009. According to a 2004 article in American Lawyer the firm had a "diverse culture" featuring an exceptional number of young lawyers but fewer than the average number of women and minority employees. In contrast, a 2014 a report by American Lawyer ranked the firms cultural diversity as 59th out of the 223 firms they evaluated.

== Controversy ==
In September 2007 the firm was dismissed by its client, Biovail Corporation after a Southern District Judge found Biovail Corp. had used legal documents in violation of a protection order. The law firm denied knowledge of the protective order and was later rehired by Biovail.

In December 2007, one of the firm's partners, Jeremy Pitcock, was fired for "extremely inappropriate personal conduct." Pitcock sued the firm for wrongful firing and defamation and the firm countered with a suit claiming Pitcock sexually harassed 12 female employees. A panel of the Appellate Division, dismissed both suits.

A former associate filed a lawsuit against the firm in August 2011 alleging negligent misrepresentation, breach of contract and wrongful termination. The suit's 2012 dismissal was upheld upon appeal.

In October 2018, the firm was at the center of a fiery exchange between then-Senator Kamala Harris and then-US Supreme Court nominee Brett Kavanaugh during his Senate hearing. Harris questioned Kavanaugh on whether he had spoken to any individuals employed at the firm about the ongoing Mueller investigation, which at the time President Trump was a personal client of the firm. It ultimately resulted in an unclear answer from Kavanaugh with lawmakers in the chamber struck at partisan odds over the appropriateness of the posed question.
