= Trump Institute =

Former traveling lecture series

Trump Institute was a traveling lecture series founded in 2005. The seminar series was owned and operated by Irene and Mike Milin of Boca Raton, Florida. It used Donald Trump's name via a licensing agreement with Trump University. According to the general counsel for The Trump Organization, the licensing agreement expired in 2009 and was not renewed.

== Operations ==
During 2006, its first full year of operation, the company put on 120 seminars in 30 cities across the United States, with The Trump Organization receiving a cut for every seat filled. Although the Institute and Trump University were separately owned, their operations overlapped, and they often used promotional materials bearing both names. Many students complained that the Institute made false promises of prosperity and provided little actual teaching, and that requests for refunds were refused or stonewalled. Hundreds of letters of complaint were filed with the state attorneys general of New York, Florida, and Texas and with local Better Business Bureaus.

Although Trump was not personally involved in the operation of the seminar, he endorsed the series in a broadcast infomercial titled The Donald Trump Way to Wealth. In the infomercial, Trump claimed that "I put all of my concepts that have worked so well for me, new and old, into our seminar... I'm teaching what I've learned."

Michael Sexton, Trump's partner in Trump University, said he chose to work with the Milins because they were "the best in the business". The Milins had faced lawsuits and regulatory actions since at least the 1980s, including fraud investigations in multiple states, and were associated with get-rich-quick schemes.

=== Allegations of plagiarism ===
In 2016, the left wing super PAC American Bridge 21st Century revealed that the Trump Institute's instructional booklet, "Billionaire's Road Map to Success", contained at least 20 pages of plagiarized text. They were copied almost verbatim from a 1995 Success magazine guide called "Real Estate Mastery System", even down to its examples ("Seller A is asking $80,000 for a single-family residence...").

The lawyer and writer who was hired from craigslist to write the Trump Institute booklet, Susan G. Parker, denied responsibility for the plagiarism. She also said that she had been appalled by the classes themselves, calling them "sleaze America" and "smoke and mirrors", and that she had simply skimmed Trump's books to create the course materials, and never collaborated or spoke with Trump. A legal representative for Trump said he was "obviously" not aware of the plagiarized booklet, and Irene Milin hung up immediately on reporters, saying she was very busy.
