= Meredith McIver =

Ghostwriter for Donald Trump

- Born: 1950 or 1951 (age 75–76)
- Education: Bachelor of English
- Alma mater: University of Utah (1976)
- Occupations: Writer; editor
- Political party: Republican

Meredith McIver (born 1950/51) is a staff writer for the Trump Organization, an author, and a former ballerina. She is credited with ghostwriting multiple books by Donald Trump and was described in 2007 as an "assistant" to him.

== Early life ==
McIver is originally from San Jose, California and moved to New York City at age 14 on a Ford Foundation Scholarship for dance. In New York, McIver trained at George Balanchine's School of American Ballet during the summers of 1965 and 1966, and was enrolled full-time in the advanced division courses at the School of American Ballet 1967–70. She later earned an English degree at the University of Utah, graduating with honors in 1976.

== Professional dancer ==
In 1981, McIver appeared on Broadway in the revival of Can-Can, a production which closed after five performances.

== Trump affiliation ==
In the 2000s, McIver worked with Donald Trump as both an assistant and a ghostwriter. She co-authored Trump: Think Like a Billionaire (2005) and several other books, with Trump.

=== 2007 Trump deposition ===
In 2007, in a deposition in a defamation lawsuit he brought against Timothy L. O'Brien, Donald Trump named McIver as the likely author, in two books they wrote together, of overstated claims of his indebtedness in the midst of the 1990s real estate market crash, making his financial comeback appear more significant.

=== Speech plagiarism controversy ===
In July 2016, McIver contributed to a speech for Melania Trump, which Mrs. Trump read at the 2016 Republican National Convention on July 19, 2016. The speech included plagiarized passages from a Michelle Obama speech.

McIver later issued a statement explaining that Melania Trump had shared with her a passage from Obama's 2008 convention speech as an example of her feelings. Due to a misunderstanding, McIver thought the passage expressed Mrs. Trump's own thinking, so she included that passage in the speech. In a statement, McIver said the following according to the Associated Press; "Over the phone, she read me some passages from Mrs. Obama’s speech as examples. I wrote them down and later included some of the phrasing in the draft that ultimately became the final speech."

The Trump family declined McIver's offer to resign over the incident.

== Selected works ==
- Trump: How to Get Rich with Donald J. Trump (2004)
- Trump: Think Like a Billionaire with Donald J. Trump (2004)
- Trump 101: The Way to Success with Donald J. Trump (2006)
- Why We Want You to Be Rich with Donald J. Trump, Robert T. Kiyosaki, and Sharon L. Lechter (2006)
- Trump: Never Give Up with Donald J. Trump (2008)
