= Marc Kasowitz =

American lawyer (born 1952)

Personal details
- Born: Marc Elliot Kasowitz; June 28, 1952 (age 74) New Haven, Connecticut, U.S.
- Party: Republican
- Spouse: Lori Kasowitz (m. 1992)
- Education: Yale University (BA); Cornell University (JD)

Marc Elliot Kasowitz (/ˈkæzəwɪts/; born June 28, 1952) is an American trial lawyer and partner of the New York–based law firm Kasowitz, which he co-founded in 1993. He has represented companies such as TPG, Douglas Elliman Realty, Teva Pharmaceuticals, Pilgrim's Pride, Fairfax Financial Holdings, Liggett, MBIA, Woodstock 50, and Hoechst Celanese. He was a personal outside attorney for U.S. President Donald Trump. On May 24, 2017, Kasowitz was retained to represent Trump personally in connection with investigations into the role of Trump's presidential campaign in Russian interference in the 2016 United States elections. He later resigned on July 20, 2017. Kasowitz also represents two Russian clients with close ties to Vladimir Putin.

== Early life ==
Kasowitz was born into a Jewish family in New Haven, Connecticut, the son of Robert and Felice (née Molaver) Kasowitz. He has a fraternal twin brother, Stephen, and a younger sister, Susan. His father ran a scrap metal business. Kasowitz's fraternal grandparents, Samuel and Rose Kasowitz, emigrated from Poland to Connecticut.

== Education ==
He went to the Hopkins School in New Haven. He graduated from Yale University with a B.A. in American history and from Cornell Law School with a J.D. in 1977.

== Career ==
Kasowitz worked for the law firm Mayer Brown until 1993, when Kasowitz, 18 other lawyers, and two clients left Mayer Brown to establish the Kasowitz Benson Torres law firm.

After the 1993 World Trade Center bombing, Kasowitz defended the Port Authority of New York and New Jersey in a lawsuit filed by victims of the attack. In 2005, the Port Authority was ruled to be negligent. He has also defended Bill O'Reilly from allegations of sexual harassment, who was ultimately forced out at Fox News in April 2017.

Early wins for Kasowitz included obtaining a $300 million settlement on behalf of 3,500 Alabama residents who were allegedly poisoned by seepage from a Monsanto Company plant manufacturing PCBs. On the defense side, Kasowitz has represented cigarette manufacturer Liggett Group for over 20 years, and in the late 1990s broke ranks with Big Tobacco in negotiated historic settlements of smoking and health litigation, which led to industry-wide settlements.

=== Donald Trump ===
According to a May 23, 2017, article in The Forward, Kasowitz, Benson, Torres, and Friedman has been a "go-to source" for Donald Trump for decades. He has represented Donald Trump in his divorce proceedings, bankruptcy cases, Trump University lawsuits, during the 2016 presidential campaign regarding sexual misconduct allegations, and during the Trump presidency in the investigation of Russian interference in the 2016 United States elections.

In Spring 2017, Kasowitz told associates that he had been personally responsible for the abrupt dismissal of U.S. Attorney Preet Bharara on March 11, 2017, having previously warned Trump, "This guy is going to get you".

Kasowitz departed Trump's White House legal team on July 20, 2017 (see below).

Kasowitz represented Trump's former medical adviser Scott Atlas, and threatened to sue a number of Stanford University-affiliated doctors and researchers who signed a letter which criticized Atlas and raised questions about his qualifications.

=== Russian clients ===
According to U.S. court records, Kasowitz's clients include the Russian oligarch Oleg Deripaska, a close associate of Vladimir Putin and a business partner of Trump's former campaign manager Paul Manafort. Kasowitz also represents the Russian state-owned bank Sberbank, a bank under sanctions by the EU and the United States after Russia's 2014 annexation of Ukraine's Crimea region.

== 2017 threats against emailer ==
In 2017, ProPublica reported that Kasowitz may be ineligible for a federal security clearance due to his alcohol abuse. After reading the articles, a currently unidentified individual sent an email to Kasowitz urging him to "resign now." Kasowitz replied with a series of profanity-laced emails, some of which took a threatening tone, writing, "I'm on you now. You are fucking with me now Let's see who you are Watch your back, bitch," as well as "Call me. Don't be afraid, you piece of shit. Stand up. If you don't call, you're just afraid." And later: "I already know where you live, I'm on you. You might as well call me. You will see me. I promise. Bro."

The emailer forwarded the emails to the Federal Bureau of Investigation to report the threats, and Kasowitz subsequently issued a statement saying "The person sending that email is entitled to his opinion, and I should not have responded in that inappropriate manner...This is one of those times where one wishes he could reverse the clock, but of course I can't."

== Personal life ==
Kasowitz is married to Lori Kasowitz, whom he met while she was working as a manager at Mayer Brown. In 2001, they created the Marc E. and Lori A. Kasowitz Scholarship at Cornell Law School. In 2007, they pledged an additional $250,000 to the law school's endowment. He and his twin brother, Stephen, established a scholarship at Hopkins School, which they attended growing up.

In recent years, Marc and Lori Kasowitz have donated hundreds of thousands of dollars to Republican causes and to Donald Trump's presidential campaign. They have also donated to Democratic politicians in the past, including President Barack Obama, President Joe Biden, and Senators Chuck Schumer, and Harry Reid.
