= Personal and business legal affairs of Donald Trump =

Affairs of President of the United States

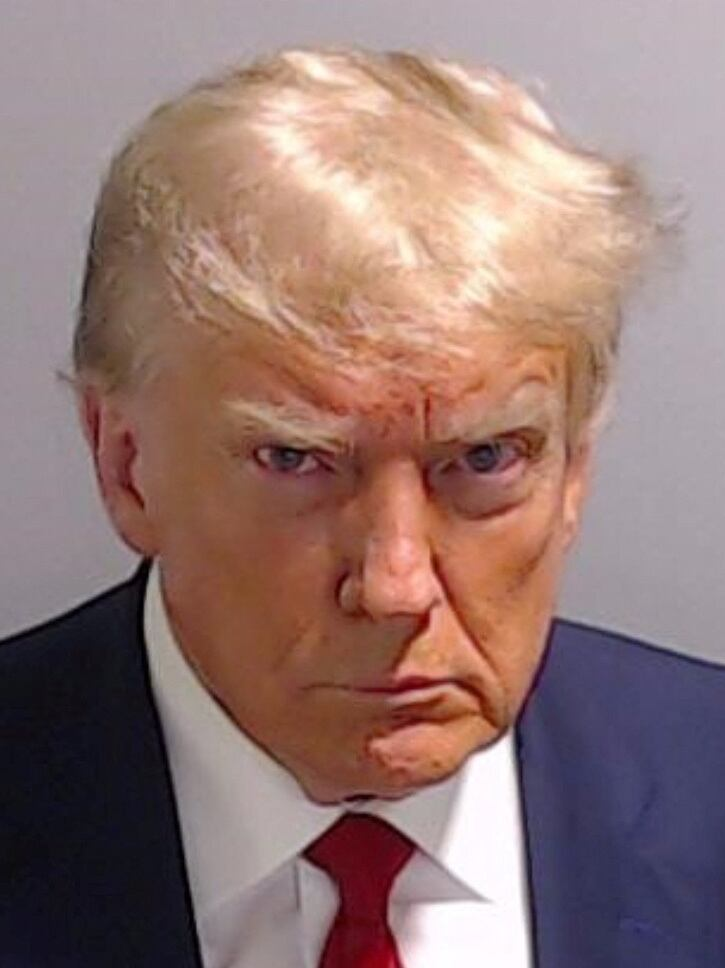
2023 mug shot of Trump, released by the Fulton County, Georgia, sheriff's office

From 1973 and until he was elected president in 2016, Donald Trump and his businesses were involved in over 4,000 legal cases in United States federal and state courts, including battles with casino patrons, million-dollar real estate lawsuits, personal defamation lawsuits, and over 100 business tax disputes. He has also been accused of sexual harassment and sexual assault, with one accusation resulting in him being held civilly liable.

In 2015, Trump's lawyer Alan Garten called Trump's legal entanglements "a natural part of doing business" in the US. While litigation is indeed common in the real estate industry, Trump has been involved in more legal cases than his fellow magnates Edward J. DeBartolo Jr., Donald Bren, Stephen M. Ross, Sam Zell, and Larry Silverstein combined. Many of the lawsuits were filed against patrons with debt to his casinos.

Numerous legal matters and investigations occurred during and after Trump's first presidency, some being of historical importance. Between October 2021 and July 2022 alone, the Republican National Committee paid more than US$2 million to attorneys representing Trump in his presidential, personal, and business capacities. In January 2023, a federal judge fined Trump and his attorney nearly $1 million, characterizing him as "a prolific and sophisticated litigant who is repeatedly using the courts to seek revenge on political adversaries".

On December 6, 2022, the parent company of Trump's many businesses, the Trump Organization, was convicted on 17 criminal charges.

Trump has been found liable for sexual abuse and defamation and is appealing an order to pay more than $80 million in damages to the victim, E. Jean Carroll. Trump, together with his associates, has also been found liable for fraud regarding overvaluation of the Trump Organization and Trump's net worth, and is appealing a $364 million fine plus $100 million interest. In 2024, Trump was convicted on numerous counts of falsifying business records related to hush money payments to adult film actress Stormy Daniels, although his sentencing was indefinitely postponed following his second election to the presidency.

In 2024, before Trump's election, a judge dismissed the federal charges relating to Trump's handling of classified documents. After his election, the special counsel decided to abandon the federal charges related to the 2020 election and the appeal of the documents case dismissal, citing the Justice Department policy of not prosecuting sitting presidents.

== Lawsuits involving government entities ==
=== U.S. federal government ===
==== 1973 federal housing suit ====
In 1973, Trump was accused by the Justice Department of violations of the Fair Housing Act in the operation of 39 buildings. The department said that black "testers" were sent to more than half a dozen buildings and were denied apartments, but a similar white tester would then be offered an apartment in the same building. The government alleged that Trump's corporation quoted different rental terms and conditions to blacks and made false "no vacancy" statements to blacks for apartments they managed in Brooklyn, Queens, and Staten Island.

Representing Trump, Roy Cohn filed a counter-suit against the government for $100 million, asserting that the charges were irresponsible and baseless. A federal judge threw out the countersuit, calling it a waste of "time and paper". Trump settled the charges out of court in 1975 without admitting guilt, saying he was satisfied that the agreement did not "compel the Trump organization to accept persons on welfare as tenants unless as qualified as any other tenant".

Tony Schwartz, the ghostwriter of Trump's book, The Art of the Deal, said that the housing case was "a classic example" of Trump being "a counterpuncher": someone accuses Trump of doing something horrible, and he "goes back at them with all guns blazing.... And admits nothing." If Trump loses, he will "declare victory".

The corporation was required to send a bi-weekly list of vacancies to the New York Urban League, a civil rights group, and give them priority for certain locations. In 1978 the Trump Organization again was in court for violating terms of the 1975 settlement; Trump denied the charges.

==== Other complaints against Trump ====
In 1988, the Justice Department sued Trump for violating procedures related to public notifications when buying voting stock in a company related to his attempted takeovers of Holiday Corporation and Bally Manufacturing Corporation in 1986. Trump agreed to pay $750,000 to settle the civil penalties of the antitrust lawsuit.

In 2016, the American Bar Association (ABA) commissioned a report to highlight Trump's excess litigation, entitled "Donald J. Trump is a Libel Bully but also a Libel Loser", but initially declined to publish it fearing being sued by Trump.

In 2001, the U.S. Securities and Exchange Commission brought a financial-reporting case against Trump Hotels & Casino Resorts Inc., alleging that the company had committed several "misleading statements in the company's third-quarter 1999 earnings release". Trump Hotels & Casino Resorts Inc. consented to the commission's cease-and-desist order, said the culprit had been dismissed, and that Trump had personally been unaware of the matter.

==== Trump complaints against his own administration ====
Before becoming president a second time, Trump filed claim against the Department of Justice, asking for $230 million to compensate him for the FBI investigation that found official and classified documents at Mar-a-Lago. In 2026, he filed a lawsuit against his own Department of the Treasury, asking for $10 billion in compensation for a leak of his tax returns during his first term.

=== New York ===
In 1985, New York City brought a lawsuit against Trump for allegedly using tactics to force out tenants of 100 Central Park South, which he intended to demolish together with the building next door. After ten years in court, the two sides negotiated a deal allowing the building to stand as condominiums.

In 2000, Donald Trump paid $250,000 to settle fines related to charges brought by New York State Lobbying Commission director David Grandeau. Trump was charged with circumventing state law to spend $150,000 lobbying against government approval of plans to construct an Indian-run casino in the Catskills, which would have diminished casino traffic to Trump's casinos in Atlantic City.

Trump sued the town of Ossining, New York, over the property tax valuation on his 147-acre (59 ha) Trump National Golf Club Westchester, located in Briarcliff Manor's portion of the town, which Trump purchased for around $8 million at a foreclosure sale in the 1990s and to which he claimed, at the club's opening, to have added $45 million in facility improvements. Although Trump stated in his 2015 FEC filing that the property was worth at least $50 million, his lawsuit seeks a $1.4 million valuation on the property, which includes a 75,000-square-foot (7,000 m^{2}) clubhouse, five overnight suites, and permission to build 71 condominium units, in an effort to shave $424,176 from his annual local property tax obligations. Trump filed the action after separately being sued by Briarcliff Manor for "intentional and illegal modifications" to a drainage system that caused more than $238,000 in damage to the village's library, public pool, and park facilities during a 2011 storm.

==== New York Attorney General lawsuits ====
On December 20, 2021, Trump filed a lawsuit against New York Attorney General Letitia James in the United States District Court for the Northern District of New York over her ongoing civil investigation into potentially unlawful inflation and deflation of property values where it was best suited to avoid tax liability and gain other financial benefits by the Trump Organization. Trump sought a permanent suspension of the investigation, which has been proceeding for over three years, because he alleged it was being used as a political tool to harass and intimidate him, his business, and his family through unwarranted subpoenas and aggressive public statements made by James both in her official capacity and personal capacity. James' office denied these claims, and in a separate statement accused Trump of using "over two years of delay tactics" through the courts to obstruct the investigation's progress. On January 10, 2022, Trump filed a motion for a preliminary injunction to prevent the New York Attorney General from continuing her investigation until a final judgement on his complaint had been made, arguing her inquiry was entirely baseless. James moved to dismiss the suit on January 26, stating that Trump is a "state-court loser" seeking to bypass the legal process in the state through federal court. On January 20, 2023, Trump's lawyers withdrew the suit. The same judge, Donald M. Middlebrooks, had just fined Trump and his attorneys almost $1 million for filing a "frivolous" defamation lawsuit against Hillary Clinton.

James has subpoenaed Trump to produce documents in connection with her investigation into the Trump Organization. On April 25, 2022, New York Judge Arthur Engoron found that Trump did not comply with the subpoena and declared him to be in civil contempt of court. He said Trump would be fined $10,000 per day until he complies.

In November 2022, Trump sued James in the United States District Court for the Southern District of Florida to block her access to the records of the trust he set up to hold his companies when he became president, the Donald J. Trump Revocable Trust. Judge Donald Middlebrooks denied his emergency motion for a preliminary injunction. On January 20, 2023, Trump withdrew the lawsuit. The same judge had just fined Trump and his lawyer almost $1 million for filing a racketeering lawsuit against Hillary Clinton and the Democratic National Committee.

==== Trump University litigation ====
In 2013, in a lawsuit filed by New York attorney general Eric Schneiderman, Trump was accused of defrauding more than 5,000 people of $40 million for the opportunity to learn Trump's real estate investment techniques in a for-profit training program, Trump University, which operated from 2005 to 2011. Trump ultimately stopped using the term "University" following a 2010 order from New York regulators, who called Trump's use of the word "misleading and even illegal"; the state had previously warned Trump in 2005 to drop the term or not offer seminars in New York. Although Trump has claimed a 98% approval rating on course evaluations, former students recounted high-pressure tactics from instructors seeking the highest possible ratings, including threats of withholding graduation certificates. In addition, the high reviews were solicited before the courses ended, when the students still anticipated receiving benefits that ultimately never materialized. Subsequently, more than 2,000 students sought and received course refunds before the end of their paid seminars.

In a separate class action civil suit against Trump University in mid-February 2014, a San Diego federal judge allowed claimants in California, Florida, and New York to proceed; a Trump counterclaim, alleging that the state attorney general's investigation was accompanied by a campaign donation shakedown, was investigated by a New York ethics board and dismissed in August 2015. Trump filed a $1 million defamation suit against former Trump University student Tarla Makaeff, who had spent about $37,000 on seminars, after she joined the class action lawsuit and publicized her classroom experiences on social media. Trump University was later ordered by a U.S. district judge in April 2015 to pay Makaeff and her lawyers $798,774.24 in legal fees and costs. Donald Trump was found to have defrauded students, and was forced to pay $25 million in restitution.

=== Other U.S. state and local governments ===
In 1991, Trump Plaza was fined $200,000 by the New Jersey Casino Control Commission for moving African American and female employees from craps tables in order to accommodate high roller Robert LiButti, a mob figure and alleged John Gotti associate, who was said to fly into fits of racist rage when he was on losing streaks. There is no indication that Trump was ever questioned in that investigation, he was not held personally liable, and Trump denies even knowing what LiButti looked like.

In 1991, one of Trump's casinos in Atlantic City, New Jersey, was found guilty of circumventing state regulations about casino financing when Donald Trump's father bought $3.5 million in chips that he had no plans to gamble. Trump Castle was forced to pay a $30,000 fine under the settlement, according to New Jersey Division of Gaming Enforcement director Jack Sweeney. Trump was not disciplined for the illegal advance on his inheritance, which was not confiscated.

In 2006, the Town of Palm Beach began fining Trump $250 per day for ordinance violations related to his erection of an 80-foot-tall (24 m) flagpole flying a 15-by-25-foot (4.6 by 7.6 m) American flag on his property. Trump sued the town for $25 million, saying that they abridged his free speech, also disputing an ordinance that local businesses be "town-serving". The two parties settled as part of a court-ordered mediation, in which Trump was required to donate $100,000 to veterans' charities. At the same time, the town ordinance was modified allowing Trump to enroll out-of-town members in his Mar-a-Lago social club.

In 2008, Trump filed a $100 million lawsuit for alleged fraud and civil rights violations against the California city of Rancho Palos Verdes, over thwarted luxury home development and expansion plans upon part of a landslide-prone golf course in the area, which was purchased by Trump in 2002 for $27 million. Trump had previously sued a local school district over land leased from them in the re-branded Trump National Golf Club, and had further angered some local residents by renaming a thoroughfare after himself. The $100 million suit was ultimately withdrawn in 2012 with Trump and the city agreeing to modified geological surveys and permit extensions for some 20 proposed luxury homes (in addition to 36 homes previously approved). Trump ultimately opted for a permanent conservation easement instead of expanded housing development on the course's driving range.

In 2015, Trump initiated a $100 million lawsuit against Palm Beach County claiming that officials, in a "deliberate and malicious" act, pressured the FAA to direct air traffic to the Palm Beach International Airport over his Mar-a-Lago estate, because he said the airplanes damaged the building and disrupted its ambiance. Trump had previously sued the county twice over airport noise; the first lawsuit, in 1995, ended with an agreement between Trump and the county; Trump's second lawsuit, in 2010, was dismissed.

==== Nevada early voting Latino turnout controversy ====
On November 8, 2016, Trump filed a lawsuit claiming early voting polling places in Clark County, Nevada, were kept open too late. These precincts had a high turnout of Latino voters. Nevada state law explicitly stated that polls were to stay open to accommodate eligible voters in line at closing time. Hillary Clinton campaign advisor Neera Tanden accused the Trump campaign of trying to suppress Latino voter turnout. A political analyst from Nevada, Jon Ralston, tweeted that the Trump lawsuit was "insane" in a state that clearly allowed the polls to remain open until everyone in line had voted. Former Nevada Secretary of State Ross Miller posted the statute that stated "voting must continue until those voters have voted". Miller said: "If there are people in line waiting to vote at 7 pm, voting must continue until everyone votes.... We still live in America, right?"

A Nevada judge denied Trump's request to separate early voting ballots. Judge Gloria Sturman, of the District Court for Clark County Nevada, ruled that County Registrar of Voters Joe P. Gloria was already obligated by state law to maintain the records that the Trump campaign was seeking. Sturman said: "That is offensive to me because it seems to go against the very principle that a vote is secret." Diana Orrock, the Republican National Committeewoman for Nevada and a vocal Trump ally, said she was unaware of the lawsuit before Politico contacted her. "I know that the [Clark County] registrar was on TV this morning saying that anybody who's in line was allowed to participate in the voting process until all of them came through," she said. "If that's what they did, I don't have a problem with that ... I don't know that filing a suit's going to accomplish anything." Orrock doubted the lawsuit would have any impact.

=== Outside the US ===
In 2003, the city of Stuttgart denied TD Trump Deutschland AG, a Trump Organization subsidiary, the permission to build a planned tower due to questions over its financing. Trump Deutschland sued the city of Stuttgart, and lost. In 2004 Trump's German corporate partner brought suit against the Trump Organization for failure to pay back a EUR 2 million pre-payment as promised.

In 2011, Donald Trump sued Scotland, alleging that it built the Aberdeen Bay Wind Farm after assuring him it would not be built. He had recently built a golf course there and planned to build an adjacent hotel. Trump lost his suit, with the Supreme Court of the United Kingdom unanimously ruling in favor of the Scottish government in 2015.

In October 2016, the Ontario Court of Appeal ruled that Trump, together with two principals of a connected developer, could be sued for various claims, including oppression, collusion and breach of fiduciary duties, in relation to his role in the marketing of units in the Trump International Hotel and Tower in Toronto, Canada. A subsequent application for leave to appeal was dismissed by the Supreme Court of Canada in March 2017. Also in October 2016, JCF Capital ULC (a private firm that had bought the construction loan on the building) announced that it was seeking court approval under the Bankruptcy and Insolvency Act to have the building sold in order to recoup its debt, which then totaled $301 million. The court allowed for its auction which took place in March 2017, but no bidders, apart from one stalking horse offer, took part.

== Other lawsuits, 1990–2009 ==
=== 1990s ===
==== Business ====
In late 1990, Trump was sued for $2 million by a business analyst for defamation, and Trump settled out of court. Shortly before Trump Taj Mahal opened in April 1990, the analyst had said that the project would fail by the end of that year. Trump threatened to sue the analyst's firm unless the analyst recanted or was fired. The analyst refused to retract the statements, and his firm fired him for ostensibly unrelated reasons. Trump Taj Mahal declared bankruptcy in November 1990, the first of several such bankruptcies. The NYSE later ordered the firm to compensate the analyst $750,000; the analyst did not release the details of his settlement with Trump.

In 1991, Trump sued the manufacturers of a helicopter that crashed in 1989, killing three executives of his New Jersey hotel casino business. The helicopter fell 2,800 feet (850 m) after the main four-blade rotor and tail rotor broke off the craft, killing Jonathan Benanav, an executive of Trump Plaza, and two others: Mark Grossinger Etess, president of Trump Taj Mahal, and Stephen F. Hyde, chief executive of the Atlantic City casinos. One of the defendant companies was owned by the Italian government, providing a basis for removing it to federal court, where the case was dismissed. The U.S. Court of Appeals for the Third Circuit upheld the dismissal in 1992, and the Supreme Court denied Trump's petition to hear the case in the same year.

In 1993, Donald Trump sued Jay Pritzker, a Chicago financier and Trump's business partner since 1979 on the Grand Hyatt hotel. Trump alleged that Pritzker overstated earnings in order to collect excessive management fees. In 1994, Pritzker sued Trump for violating their agreement by, among other ways, failing to remain solvent. The two parties ended the feud in 1995 in a sealed settlement, in which Trump retained some control of the hotel and Pritzker would receive reduced management fees and pay Trump's legal expenses.

In 1993, Vera Coking sued Trump and his demolition contractor for damage to her home during construction of the Trump Plaza Hotel and Casino. In 1997, she dropped the suit against Trump and settled with her contractor for $90,000. Coking had refused to sell her home to Trump and ultimately won a 1998 Supreme Court decision that prevented Atlantic City from using eminent domain to condemn her property.

In 1996, Trump was sued by more than 20 African-American residents of Indiana who charged that Trump reneged on promises to hire 70% of his work force from the minority community for his riverboat casino on Lake Michigan. The suit also charged that he hadn't honored his commitments to steer sufficient contracts to minority-owned businesses in Gary, Indiana. The suit was eventually dismissed due to procedural and jurisdiction issues.

In the late 1990s, Donald Trump and rival Atlantic City casino owner Stephen Wynn engaged in an extended legal conflict during the planning phase of new casinos Wynn had proposed to build. Both owners filed lawsuits against one another and other parties, including the State of New Jersey, beginning with Wynn's antitrust accusation against Trump. After two years in court, Wynn's Mirage casino sued Trump in 1999 alleging that his company had engaged in a conspiracy to harm Mirage and steal proprietary information, primarily lists of wealthy Korean gamblers. In response, Trump's attorneys claimed that Trump's private investigator dishonored his contract by working as a "double agent" for the Mirage casino by secretly taping conversations with Trump. All the cases were settled at the same time on the planned day of an evidentiary hearing in court in February 2000, which was never held.

==== Personal and sexual ====
In 1992, Trump sued ex-wife Ivana Trump for not honoring a gag clause in their divorce agreement by disclosing facts about him in her bestselling book. Trump won the gag order. The divorce was granted in 1990 on grounds that Ivana claimed Donald Trump's treatment of her was "cruel and inhuman treatment". Years later, Ivana said that she and Donald "are the best of friends".

A sexual assault claim for child rape at a party of Jeffrey Epstein in 1994 was filed against Trump in New York in June 2016. It was dropped on November 4, 2016.

In April 1997, Jill Harth Houraney filed a $125,000,000 lawsuit against Trump for sexual harassment in 1993, claiming he "'groped' her under her dress and told her he wanted to make her his 'sex slave'". Harth voluntarily withdrew the suit when her husband settled a parallel case. Trump has called the allegations "meritless".

=== 2000s ===
From 2000 on, Trump tried to partner with a German venture in building a "Trump Tower Europe" in Germany. The company founded for this, "TD Trump Deutschland AG" was dissolved in 2003, several lawsuits following in the years thereafter.

Trump sued Leona Helmsley, and Helmsley counter-sued Trump due to contentions regarding ownership and operation of the Empire State Building. In 2002, Trump announced that he and his Japanese business partners, were selling the Empire State Building to partners of his rival Leona Helmsley.

In 2004, Donald Trump sued Richard T. Fields in Broward County Circuit Court (in Florida); Fields was once Trump's business partner in the casino business, but had recently become a successful casino developer in Florida apart from Trump. Fields counter-sued Trump in Florida court. Trump alleged that Fields misled other parties into believing he still consulted for Trump, and Fields alleged improprieties in Trump's business. The two businessmen agreed in 2008 to drop the lawsuits when Fields agreed to buy Trump Marina in Atlantic City, New Jersey, for $316 million, but the deal was unsettled again in 2009 because Trump resigned his leadership of Trump Entertainment after Fields lowered his bid. Fields never bought the company, which went into bankruptcy about the same time and was sold for $38 million. Trump's lawsuit was settled in 2010.

In 2004, the Trump Organization partnered with Bayrock Group on a $200 million hotel and condo project in Fort Lauderdale Beach, to be called Trump International Hotel & Tower. After proceeding for five years, real estate market devaluation stymied the project in 2009 and Trump dissolved his licensing deal, demanding that his name be removed from the building. Soon after this, the project defaulted on a $139 million loan in 2010. Investors later sued the developers for fraud. Trump petitioned to have his name removed from the suit, saying he had only lent his name to the project. However his request was refused since he had participated in advertising for it. The insolvent building project spawned over 10 lawsuits, some of which were still not settled in early 2016.

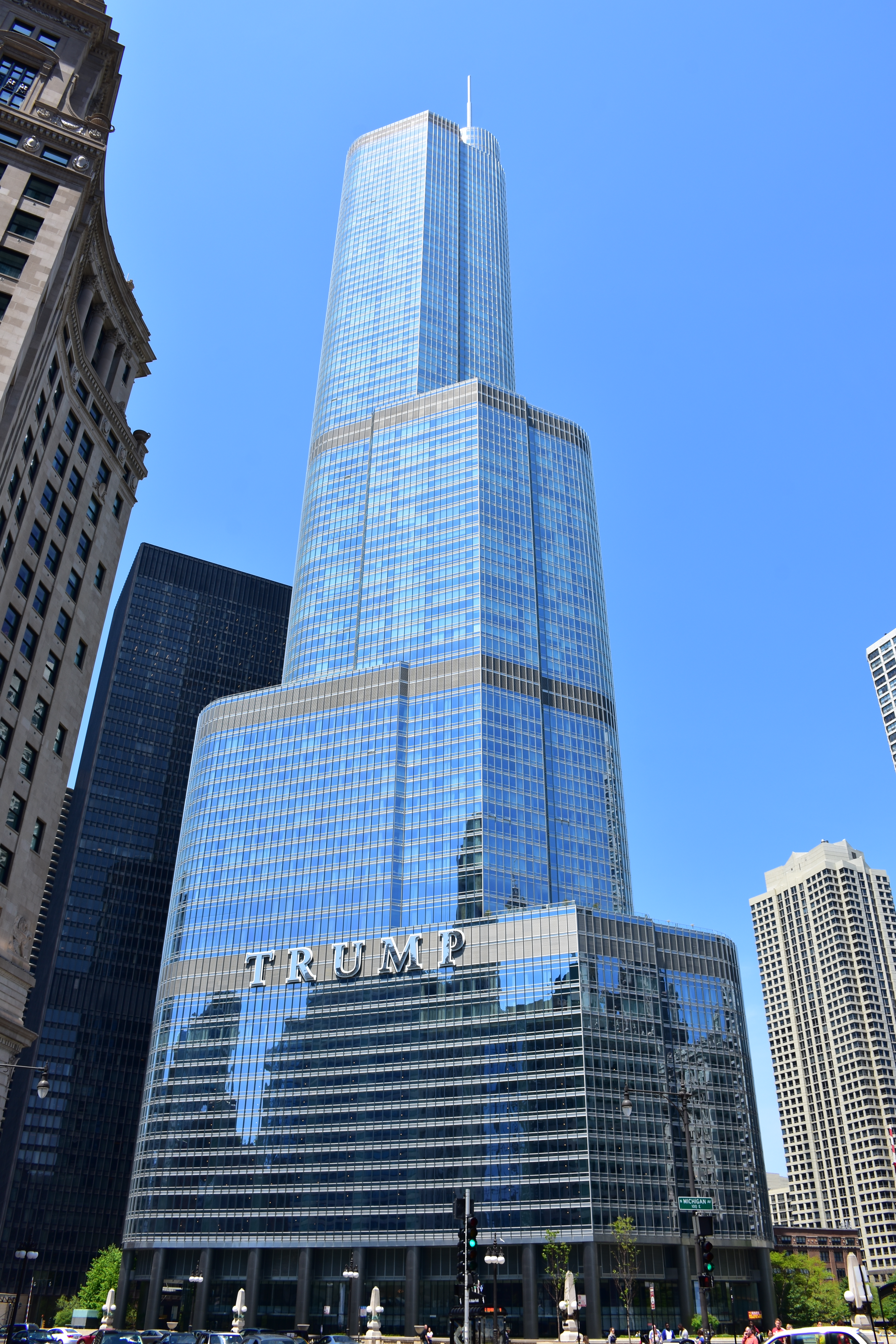
Trump International Hotel and Tower in Chicago

After the 2008 housing-market collapse, Deutsche Bank attempted to collect $40 million that Donald Trump personally guaranteed against their $640 million loan for Trump International Hotel and Tower in Chicago. Rather than paying the debt, Trump sued Deutsche Bank for $3 billion for undermining the project and damage to his reputation. Deutsche Bank then filed suit to obtain the $40 million. The two parties settled in 2010 with Deutsche Bank extending the loan term by five years.

In 2008, developer Leslie Dick Worldwide Ltd., New York, filed a RICO complaint against 17 parties, including Donald Trump, financier George Soros, Fortress Investment Group and Cerberus Capital Management, over the 2003 sale of the General Motors Corp. Building in midtown Manhattan. The case was voluntarily dismissed without prejudice a year later.

In 2009, Donald Trump sued a law firm he had used, Morrison Cohen, for $5 million for mentioning his name and providing links to related news articles on its website. This lawsuit followed a lawsuit by Trump alleging overcharging by the law firm, and a countersuit by Morrison Cohen seeking unpaid legal fees. The suit was dismissed in a 15-page ruling by Manhattan Supreme Court justice Eileen Bransten, who ruled that the links to news articles concerned "matters of public interest."

In 2009, Trump was sued by investors who had made deposits for condos in the canceled Trump Ocean Resort Baja Mexico. The investors said that Trump misrepresented his role in the project, stating after its failure that he had been little more than a spokesperson for the entire venture, disavowing any financial responsibility for the debacle. Investors were informed that their investments would not be returned due to the cancellation of construction. In 2013, Trump settled the lawsuit with more than one hundred prospective condo owners for an undisclosed amount.

== Other lawsuits, 2010–present ==
=== Lawsuit against CBS ===
In October 2024, Trump sued CBS News for releasing two different clips of an interview with Kamala Harris, Trump's opponent in the presidential election, on the television program 60 Minutes, alleging deceitful manipulation to harm his electoral chances. Most legal observers considered Trump's case was meritless and would fail. However, in July 2025, Shari Redstone, controlling shareholder of CBS's parent company Paramount, urged the board to settle. Redstone feared a protracted legal battle that would threaten the planned merger of Skydance Media and Paramount, and knowing that the Trump administration's approval of the merger was necessary. Paramount agreed to pay $16 million to Trump's future presidential library. Stephen Colbert, who had seen his show cancelled by CBS, referred to the settlement as a "big fat bribe". while a CBS press statement asserted that the non-renewal of The Late Show with Stephen Colbert was "purely a financial decision".

=== Construction and property law matters ===
In 2013, 87-year-old Jacqueline Goldberg unsuccessfully sued Trump on allegations that he cheated her in a condominium sale by bait-and-switch when she was purchasing properties at the Trump International Hotel and Tower.

=== Defamation matters ===
==== Lawsuits filed by Trump ====
In 1984, Trump reportedly filed a $500-million libel suit against the architecture critic of The Chicago Tribune, Paul Gapp, and the Tribune Company.

Author Timothy L. O'Brien had written in his 2005 book TrumpNation: The Art of Being the Donald that Trump's true net worth was really between $150 and $250 million. In 2006, Trump sued O'Brien and his publisher Warner Books for making "egregiously false and malicious statements" and asked for $5 billion, saying that the author's alleged underestimation of his net worth was motivated by malice and had cost him business deals and damaged his reputation. Trump had reportedly told O'Brien he was worth billions and, in 2005, had publicly stated such. In 2011, an appellate court upheld a New Jersey Superior Court judge's decision dismissing the lawsuit. The appellate court cited the consistency of O'Brien's three confidential sources.

In 2014, the former Miss Pennsylvania Sheena Monnin ultimately settled a $5 million arbitration judgment against her, having been sued by Trump after alleging that the Miss USA 2012 pageant results were rigged. Monnin wrote on her Facebook page that another contestant told her during a rehearsal that she had seen a list of the top five finalists, and when those names were called in their precise order, Monnin realized the pageant election process was suspect, compelling Monnin to resign her Miss Pennsylvania title. The Trump Organization's lawyer said that Monnin's allegations had cost the pageant a lucrative BP sponsorship deal and threatened to discourage women from entering Miss USA contests in the future. According to Monnin, testimony from the Miss Universe Organization and Ernst & Young revealed that the top 15 finalists were selected by pageant directors regardless of preliminary judges' scores. As part of the settlement, Monnin was not required to retract her original statements. Monnin sued her lawyer for malpractice because he did not attend the arbitration hearing and did not inform Monnin that it was taking place. She said that the settlement "meant she never had to pay Trump a dollar out of her own pocket."

On July 28, 2023, a federal district court judge dismissed an October 2022 Trump lawsuit against CNN, stating that CNN's multiple uses of the term "big lie" about Trump's false claims of election fraud did not constitute actionable defamation. The judge wrote that CNN's statements were opinion, not factually verifiable statements, and that "no reasonable viewer" would infer that "Trump advocates the persecution and genocide of Jews or any other group of people".

In December 2022, Trump sued the Pulitzer Prize board for defamation. Trump had requested the board to revoke the prize they had awarded to The Washington Post and The New York Times in 2018 for their reporting on Russian interference in the 2016 presidential election. The board rejected his request, stating that their "reviews concluded 'no passages or headlines, contentions or assertions in any of the winning submissions were discredited by facts that emerged subsequent to the conferral of the prizes.'" Trump's suit alleged that the statement was malicious and intended to damage his reputation. In February 2025, the Florida Court of Appeals denied the board's motion to dismiss Trump's lawsuit. The lawsuit entered the discovery phase on December 11, 2025, with the board demanding for documentations, including tax returns and medical records, that Trump had been harmed.

In October 2023, Trump filed a lawsuit in London against Orbis Business Intelligence and Christopher Steele (who was later removed from the suit) alleging that Orbis violated British data protection laws when compiling a 2016 dossier about Trump, later called the Steele dossier. Trump accused Steele of making "'shocking and scandalous claims' that were false and harmed his reputation". Trump's witness statement said: "I can confirm that I did not, at any time engage in perverted sexual behaviour including the hiring of prostitutes to engage in 'golden showers' in the presidential suite of a hotel in Moscow." Trump asserted "The inaccurate personal data in the Dossier has, and continues, to cause me significant damage and distress." On February 1, 2024, the High Court sided with Orbis and dismissed Trump's claim stating that the filing was outside the six-year period of limitations and the case was "bound to fail". In March 2024, Trump was ordered to pay legal fees of £300,000 ($382,000) to Orbis.

In December 2024, the Walt Disney Company, owner of ABC News, settled a defamation lawsuit brought by Trump against ABC News, by agreeing to donate $15 million to Trump's future presidential library foundation and paying $1 million in Trump's legal fees. Disney also agreed to ABC and anchor George Stephanopoulos publishing a statement saying they regretted that Stephanopoulos, in an interview with Trump, had repeatedly said that Trump had been found liable for raping E. Jean Carroll.

On July 18, 2025, Trump sued the Wall Street Journal, its publishing company Dow Jones & Company, Dow Jones's owner News Corp, News Corp owner Rupert Murdoch, and two Wall Street Journal journalists for defamation, seeking $10 billion in damages. A day earlier, the paper had published an article stating that in 2003 Trump had written a lewd note with a drawing of a nude woman that was included in a 50th birthday album for convicted sex offender Jeffrey Epstein. In April 2026, the judge dismissed the lawsuit, saying Trump had failed to "plausibly allege" that the paper had maliciously published false or inaccurate material.

In September 2025, Trump sued The New York Times, four of its reporters, and Penguin Random House, the publisher of a book written by two of the reporters, in the Middle Florida U.S. District Court seeking $15 billion in damages for defamation. The complaint cited three articles written by Peter Baker and Michael S. Schmidt and a book co-written by Russ Buettner and Susanne Craig, Lucky Loser, that were published within two months of the 2024 presidential election. Judge Steven D. Merryday dismissed the case as "improper and impermissible" four days later, saying that a complaint is neither a "public forum for vituperation and invective" nor a "megaphone for public relations or a podium for a passionate oration at a political rally or the functional equivalent of the Hyde Park Speakers' Corner". He gave Trump 28 days to file an amended complaint of fewer than 40 pages. On October 16, Trump filed an amended, 40-page complaint.

On December 16, 2025, Trump filed a $10 billion defamation lawsuit in Miami, Florida, federal court against the BBC. The suit argues that a video clip of Trump's January 6, 2021, speech shown on an episode of the BBC's documentary news program Panorama, which is not broadcast in the U.S., on the day before the 2024 United States presidential election had been fabricated and aired to discourage voters in Florida from voting for Trump.

==== Lawsuits filed against Trump ====
On January 17, 2017, Summer Zervos, represented by attorney Gloria Allred, filed a defamation suit against President-elect Donald Trump for claiming that she had lied in her public sexual assault allegations against him. In March 2021, a New York appeals court dismissed Trump's appeal and allowed the suit to proceed. Later in the year, the court ordered Trump to answer questions under oath, but Zervos withdrew from the case before Trump had to testify.

Former FBI agent Peter Strzok (who was fired and seeks to be reinstated) and former FBI lawyer Lisa Page (who resigned and seeks back pay) have filed lawsuits against Trump. They both claim that their job losses were political retribution for criticizing Trump in their text messages with each other before his 2016 election. In February 2023, a judge said that Trump could be deposed in these lawsuits.

Trump has been accused of racism for insisting that a group of black and Latino teenagers were guilty of raping a white woman in the 1989 Central Park jogger case, even after they were exonerated by DNA evidence in 2002. In October 2024, the men sued Trump for defamation after he said in the televised September presidential debate that they had committed the crime and killed the woman. The men requested a jury trial and asked for unspecified compensatory and punitive damages.

=== Trump lawsuit against the Des Moines Register ===
On December 17, 2024, Trump sued the Des Moines Register, its parent company Gannet, and J. Ann Selzer and her polling firm Selzer & Company for a violation of the Iowa Consumer Fraud Act, accusing them of "brazen election interference". Shortly before the 2024 presidential election, the newspaper had released a poll that showed Democratic candidate Kamala Harris leading Trump by three points. Because the Republican governor of Iowa had adopted an anti SLAPP law in May 2025, Trump dropped his federal lawsuit, which was widely considered a SLAPP lawsuit, and as of July refiled it at the state level.

=== Trump $50 million copyright lawsuit against Bob Woodward ===
In 2023, Trump sued journalist Bob Woodward, the book's publisher Simon & Schuster LLC, and Simon & Schuster's former parent company Paramount for copyright violation when they published the Trump interviews Woodward taped for his book Rage in the audiobook The Trump Tapes, asking for $50 million in damages. The judge dismissed the case in July 2025, giving Trump a month to file an amended plausible claim.

=== Financial matters ===
==== ALM lawsuit ====
In July 2011, New York firm ALM Unlimited filed a lawsuit against Trump for non-payment. ALM had been hired in 2003 to seek offers from clothing companies for a Trump fashion line, and it had arranged a meeting between Trump and PVH, which licensed the Trump name for dress shirts and neckwear. ALM, which had received over $300,000 during a three-year period, alleged in the lawsuit that Trump's discontinuation of payments in 2008 was against their initial agreement. In pre-trial depositions, Trump and two of his business officials – attorney George H. Ross and executive vice president of global licensing Cathy Glosser – gave contradictory statements regarding whether ALM was entitled to payments. Trump, who felt that ALM had only a limited role in the deal between him and PVH, said "I have thousands of checks that I sign a week, and I don't look at very many of the checks; and eventually I did look, and when I saw them (ALM) I stopped paying them because I knew it was a mistake or somebody made a mistake."

Trump and ALM failed to settle, and in January 2013 a judge ordered that the case go to trial. During the trial in April 2013, Trump said that ALM's role in the PVH agreement was insubstantial, stating that Regis Philbin (rather than ALM) was the one who recommended PVH to him. Trump's attorney, Alan Garten, said ALM was not legally entitled to any money. The judge ruled in favor of Trump later that month because there had never been a valid contract between him and ALM.

==== ACN lawsuit ====
Investors sued Donald Trump and his family for fraud, false advertising, and unfair competition. They alleged that Trump recommended the multi-level marketing company ACN as a good investment and that Trump did not disclose that he was being paid by ACN. In January 2024, a U.S. District Judge dismissed the case from federal court, recommending plaintiffs file in state courts.

==== Mary L. Trump lawsuit ====
In September 2020, Trump's niece, Mary L. Trump, sued Trump and his siblings Robert and Maryanne Trump, alleging that they fraudulently kept her and her brother out of the will of Fred Trump (Donald's father), including by conspiring with a trustee assigned to her, and acted to devalue her interests in the family business—effectively defrauding her of tens of millions of dollars. Further, she alleges that these accomplices pressured her to sign a settlement agreement by threatening to bankrupt interests benefitting her and cut off the healthcare insurance for her infant nephew, who was then suffering from cerebral palsy. Her suit was dismissed in November 2022, and she appealed. In June 2023, her appeal was denied.

==== Copyright infringement ====
In September 2020, musician Eddy Grant sued Trump for unauthorized use of Grant's 1983 chart hit "Electric Avenue" in an August 2020 presidential campaign video. Trump posted the video on Twitter where it was viewed more than 13 million times before Twitter took it down after Grant's copyright complaint. Grant's song plays during 40 seconds of the animated 55-second video. Trump unsuccessfully attempted to have the suit dismissed, citing fair use and "absolute presidential immunity". Grant asked for $300,000 in damages. Trump's attorney told the court that the deposition contained sensitive information about Trump's presidential campaign strategy. He asked that Trump and campaign advisor Dan Scavino's testimony be permanently sealed because it would give an "unwarranted competitive advantage" to his opponents in the 2024 presidential election, and because it "could be used against them in other, parallel, litigations unrelated to this matter.". The case, Grant v. Trump (1:20-cv-07103), is pending in federal court in the Southern District New York. In September 2024, the judge ruled that fair use did not apply to the campaign ad and that Trump had to pay Grant damages in an amount to be determined by a jury, as well as Grant's legal fees.

On August 11, 2024, the estate of musician Isaac Hayes filed a lawsuit against Trump for unauthorized use of Hayes' 1966 chart hit "Hold On, I'm Comin'" across 134 campaign rallies. Hayes' estate demanded a "cessation of use, removal of all related videos, a public disclaimer, and payment of $3 million in licensing fees".

On August 21, 2024, the record label of singer Beyoncé sent a cease-and-desist notice to Trump's presidential campaign for unauthorized use of Beyonce's 2016 hit single "Freedom" in a promotional video. The song was used in the background of a video featuring Trump getting off a plane in Michigan and posted to Twitter by campaign spokesman Steven Cheung. By the next day, it was reported that the video was deleted from Cheung's account.

=== Breach of contract matters ===
==== 2013 ====
In 2013 Trump sued comedian Bill Maher for $5 million for breach of contract. Maher had appeared on The Tonight Show with Jay Leno and had offered to pay $5 million to a charity if Trump produced his birth certificate to prove that Trump's mother had not mated with an orangutan. This was said by Maher in response to Trump having previously challenged Obama to produce his birth certificate, and offering $5 million payable to a charity of Obama's choice, if Obama produced his college applications, transcripts, and passport records. Trump produced his birth certificate and filed a lawsuit after Maher was not forthcoming, claiming that Maher's $5 million offer was legally binding. "I don't think he was joking," Trump said. "He said it with venom." Trump withdrew his lawsuit against the comedian after eight weeks.

==== 2014 ====
In 2014, model Alexia Palmer filed a civil suit against Trump Model Management for promising a $75,000 annual salary but paying only $3,380.75 for three years' work. Palmer, who came to the US at age 17 from Jamaica under the H-1B visa program in 2011, claimed to be owed more than $200,000. Palmer contended that Trump Model Management charged, in addition to a management fee, "obscure expenses" from postage to limousine rides that consumed the remainder of her compensation. Palmer alleged that Trump Model Management promised to withhold only 20% of her net pay as agency expenses, but after charging her for those "obscure expenses", ended up taking 80%. Trump attorney Alan Garten claimed the lawsuit is "bogus and completely frivolous". Palmer filed a class-action lawsuit against the modeling agency with similar allegations. The case was dismissed from U.S. federal court in March 2016, in part because Palmer's immigration status, via H1-B visa sponsored by Trump, required labor complaints to be filed through a separate process.

==== 2015 ====
In 2015, Trump sued Univision, demanding $500 million for breach of contract and defamation when they dropped their planned broadcast of the Miss USA pageant. The network said that the decision was made because of Trump's "insulting remarks about Mexican immigrants". Trump settled the lawsuit with Univision CEO Randy Falco out of court.

In July 2015, Trump filed a $10 million lawsuit in D.C. Superior Court for breach of contract against Spanish celebrity chef José Andrés, claiming that he backed out of a deal to open the flagship restaurant at Trump International Hotel in Washington, D.C. Andrés replied that Trump's lawsuit was "both unsurprising and without merit" and filed an $8 million counterclaim against a Trump Organization subsidiary.

Also in July 2015, Chef Geoffrey Zakarian decided to withdraw from the Washington, D.C., project together with Andrés in the wake of Trump's comments on Mexican illegal immigrants, and is expected to lose his own $500,000 restaurant lease deposit as a result. Trump denounced and then sued Zakarian in August 2015 for a sum "in excess of $10 million" for lost rent and other damages. Trump's lawsuit called Zakarian's offense at his remarks "curious in light of the fact that Mr. Trump's publicly shared views on immigration have remained consistent for many years, and Mr. Trump's willingness to frankly share his opinions is widely known".

Disputes with both chefs were eventually settled in April 2017.

In 2015, restaurant workers at Trump SoHo filed a lawsuit claiming that from 2009 to at least the time of the filing, gratuities added to customers' checks were illegally withheld from employees. The Trump Organization responded that the dispute is between the employees and their employer, a third-party contractor. In 2019, the third-party contractor settled with the workers for an undisclosed amount.

==== 2018 ====
In July 2018, Noel Cintron, the personal driver for Donald Trump before he became the president of the United States, filed a lawsuit Cintron v Trump Organization LLC with the Supreme Court of the State of New York (Manhattan). The lawsuit claims that during his 25-year employment by Trump, he was not compensated for overtime and the second time his salary was raised he was induced to surrender his health insurance, an action which saved Trump approximately $17,866 per year. In his lawsuit, Cintron sought $178,200 of overtime back pay, plus $5,000 in penalties that are seen under the New York State Labor Law. Cintron dropped the lawsuit on August 30, 2018, with the case being submitted to arbitration for resolution.

==== 2023 ====
On April 12, 2023, Trump sued his former attorney, Michael Cohen, for breach of contract. Trump sought $500 million in damages. Trump dropped the suit on October 5, 2023.

=== Breach of confidentiality and conspiracy ===
In 2021, Trump sued The New York Times, three of its journalists, and his niece Mary L. Trump in New York County Supreme Court over disclosure of some of his tax information in a 2018 article in the Times. The article, which went on to win a Pulitzer prize, revealed that Trump had received over $400 million from his father and had used questionable techniques to minimize his tax burden. Trump claimed that the journalists had conspired with Mary Trump to obtain confidential information, resulting in her breaching the confidentiality agreement she signed in 2001. The case against the Times and its journalists was dismissed in May 2023 on First Amendment grounds. Trump was ordered to pay the legal costs of the New York Times and paid $392,000 in February 2024. A ruling the next month allowed Donald to pursue his claim against Mary who appealed the ruling. The appeals court ruled in May to let the case proceed, stating that there was "a substantial basis in law" for breach of contract but that the duration of the confidentiality agreement needed to be determined and that Donald had to prove whether the disclosure had caused him any damages.

=== Assault claims ===
In September 2015, five men who had demonstrated outside of a Trump presidential campaign event at Trump Tower in New York City sued Donald Trump, alleging that Trump's security staff punched one of them. They said that Trump's security guards had been advised by city police that the protests there were permitted. Several people videotaped the incident. A New York judge had ordered a videotaped deposition in 2019. Trump invoked presidential privilege, and the deposition was delayed until October 18, 2021. His testimony under oath lasted for over 4 hours. The lawsuit was eventually settled in November 2022.

In June 2015, the Culinary Workers Union filed charges with the National Labor Relations Board (NLRB), alleging that the owners of Trump Hotel Las Vegas "violated the federally protected rights of workers to participate in union activities" and engaged in "incidents of alleged physical assault, verbal abuse, intimidation, and threats by management". In October 2015, the Trump Ruffin Commercial and Trump Ruffin Tower I, the owners of Trump Hotel Las Vegas, sued the Culinary Workers Union and another union, alleging that they had knowingly distributed flyers that falsely stated that Donald Trump had stayed at a rival unionized hotel, rather than his own non-unionized hotel, during a trip to Las Vegas.

E. Jean Carroll's defamation and assault claims began trial in Manhattan federal court on April 25, 2023. On May 9, 2023, after deliberating for less than three hours, a jury of six men and three women found Trump liable for sexually abusing and defaming Carroll, but also did not find him liable for rape. The jury then awarded Carroll about $5 million in compensatory and punitive damages. On January 26, 2024, following another trial, Trump was ordered to pay Carroll an additional $83.3 million in damages. Trump appealed that judgement arguing that the damages were excessive, but lost that appeal in the 2nd U.S. Circuit Court of Appeals of September 8, 2025.

=== Lawsuit for inciting violence at March 2016 campaign rally ===
During a campaign rally on March 1, 2016, in Louisville, Kentucky, Trump repeatedly said "get 'em out of here" while pointing at anti-Trump protesters as they were forcibly escorted out by his supporters. Three protesters say they were repeatedly shoved and punched while Trump pointed at them from the podium, citing widely shared video evidence of the events. They also cited previous statements by Trump about paying the legal bills of supporters who got violent, or suggesting a demonstrator deserved to be "roughed up."

The lawsuit accuses Donald Trump of inciting violence against protesters in Louisville, Kentucky. The plaintiffs are Kashiya Nwanguma (21), Molly Shah (36) and Henry Brousseau (17). The suit is against Trump, his campaign, and three Trump supporters (Matthew Heimbach, Alvin Bamberger and an unnamed defendant). Bamberger, who was wearing a Veteran's uniform in the video, apologized to the Korean War Veterans Association immediately after the event, writing that he "physically pushed a young woman down the aisle toward the exit" after "Trump kept saying 'get them out, get them out."

Trump's attorneys requested to get the case dismissed, arguing he was protected by free speech laws, and wasn't trying to get his supporters to resort to violence. They also stated that Trump had no duty to the protesters, and they had assumed the personal risk of injury by deciding to protest at the rally.

On Saturday, April 1, 2017, Judge David J. Hale in Louisville ruled against the dismissal of a lawsuit, stating there was ample evidence to support that the injuries of the protesters were a "direct and proximate result" of Trump's words and actions. Hale wrote, "It is plausible that Trump's direction to 'get 'em out of here' advocated the use of force," and, "It was an order, an instruction, a command." Hale wrote that the Supreme Court has ruled out some protections for free speech when used to incite violence.

Defendant Heimbach requested to dismiss the discussion in the lawsuit about his association with a white nationalist group, and also requested to dismiss discussion of statements he made about how a President Trump would advance the interests of the group. The request was declined, with the judge saying the information could be important for determining punitive damages because they add context.

Hale also declined to remove the allegation that plaintiff Nwanguma, who is African-American, was victim to ethnic, racial and sexist slurs at the rally from the crowd. The judge stated that this context may support claims by the plaintiffs' of incitement and negligence by Trump and the Trump campaign. The judge wrote, "While the words themselves are repulsive, they are relevant to show the atmosphere in which the alleged events occurred."

The judge stated that all people have a duty to use care to prevent foreseeable injury. "In sum, the Court finds that Plaintiffs have adequately alleged that their harm was foreseeable and that the Trump Defendants had a duty to prevent it." The case was referred a federal magistrate, Judge H. Brent Brennenstuhl, who will handle preliminary litigation, discovery and settlement efforts.

Heimbach filed a separate counterclaim in April 2017, arguing that Trump was "responsible for any injuries" he [Heimbach] "might have inflicted because Mr. Trump directed him and others to take action". Heimbach, "a self-employed landscaper", and a member of the Traditionalist Youth Network, "which advocates separate American 'ethno states', "spends much of his time" online writing "against Jews, gays and immigrants and urging whites to stand up for their race." He wrote his own lawsuit which requested that Trump pay Heimbach's "legal fees, citing a promise Mr. Trump made at an earlier rally to pay legal costs of anyone who removed protesters." Heimbach's "counterclaim" against Trump has "probed the limits of free speech and public protest while confronting the courts with a unique legal argument". On May 5, Trump's lawyers submitted legal filings that argue that Heimbach's "indemnity claim should be dismissed on the same grounds". According to a University of Virginia law professor, Leslie Kendrick, this indemnity or "impleader" case is "highly unusual." New York University's Samuel Issacharoff, a professor of constitutional law, argued that care must be taken to not allow speech, in the "context of a political rally" to be "turned into something that is legally sanctionable."

=== Payments related to alleged affairs ===
On March 30, 2023, Trump was indicted regarding payments to Stormy Daniels.

Adult film actress Stormy Daniels has alleged that she and Trump had an extramarital affair in 2006, months after the birth of his youngest child. Just before the 2016 presidential election Daniels, whose real name is Stephanie Clifford, was paid $130,000 by Trump's attorney Michael Cohen as part of a non-disclosure agreement (NDA), through an LLC set up by Cohen; he says he used his own money for the payment. In February 2018, Daniels sued the LLC asking to be released from the agreement so she could tell her story. Cohen filed a private arbitration proceeding and obtained a restraining order to keep her from discussing the case. White House Press Secretary Sarah Huckabee Sanders said Trump denied the allegations.

On March 6, 2018, Daniels sued Trump in California Superior Court, claiming the NDA never came into effect because Trump hadn't personally signed it. On March 16, Cohen, with Trump's approval, asked for Daniels' suit to be moved from state to federal court, given that they lived in different states and the matter concerned a large sum; Cohen asserted that Daniels could owe $20 million in liquidated damages for breaching the agreement. The filing marked the first time that Trump himself, through his personal attorney, had taken part in the Daniels litigation. In early April 2018, Trump said he hadn't known that Cohen paid Daniels, why Cohen did so or where Cohen got the money. On April 30, Daniels further sued Trump for defamation. In May 2018, Trump's annual financial disclosure revealed that he reimbursed Cohen in 2017 for expenditures related to the Daniels case.

In August 2018, Cohen pleaded guilty to breaking campaign finance laws, admitting paying hush money of $130,000 and $150,000 "at the direction of a candidate for federal office" to two women who alleged affairs with that candidate, "with the purpose of influencing the election". The figures match sums of payments made to Stormy Daniels and Playboy model Karen McDougal. American Media, Inc. had reportedly in 2016 bought for $150,000 the rights to a story by McDougal alleging an affair with a married Trump from 2006 which lasted between nine months to a year. David Pecker (AMI CEO/chairman and friend of Trump), Dylan Howard (AMI chief content officer) and Allen Weisselberg (chief financial officer of the Trump Organization) were reportedly granted witness immunity in exchange for their testimony regarding the illegal payments.

In response, Trump said that he only knew about the payments "later on". Trump also said regarding the payments: "They didn't come out of the campaign, they came from me."

The Wall Street Journal reported on November 9, 2018, that federal prosecutors have evidence of Trump's "central role" in payments to Stormy Daniels and Karen McDougal that violated campaign-finance laws.

In a December 7, 2018, sentencing memorandum for Cohen, federal prosecutors implicated Trump in directing Cohen to commit the campaign finance law felonies for which Cohen had pleaded guilty. Shortly after the memorandum court filing, Trump tweeted: "Totally clears the president. Thank you!" Cohen was sentenced to three years in federal prison.

On December 13, 2018, Trump denied directing Cohen to make hush payments. That same day, NBC News reported that Trump was present in an August 2015 meeting with Cohen and David Pecker when they discussed how American Media could help counter negative stories about Trump's relationships with women, confirming previous reporting by The Wall Street Journal. In 2019, Cohen testified to Congress that Trump did order him to pay Stormy Daniels $130,000 as hush money and then lie about the payment.

A criminal investigation initiated by Manhattan District Attorney Cyrus Vance Jr. fell dormant. In November 2022, the New York Times reported Vance's successor Alvin Bragg was reviving the investigation. The Times reported in March 2023 that Bragg's office had recently signaled to Trump's attorneys that he likely faced indictment in the Daniels matter. Michael Cohen testified before the grand jury on March 13, and prosecutors offered Trump an opportunity to testify too. By March 17, federal, state and local law enforcement and security agencies were discussing contingencies for a likely Trump indictment. He was indicted on March 30.

Trump was convicted on all 34 felony counts on May 30, 2024. He became the first U.S. president to have been convicted of a felony in any state or federal court.

=== Lawsuits over congressional subpoenas ===
In March 2019, the House Committee on Oversight and Reform opened an investigation into Trump's finances, and issued a subpoena for ten years of his tax returns. Trump later sued the chairman of the committee, Rep. Elijah Cummings, seeking to quash the subpoena.

In April 2019, Trump (along with his children Eric, Ivanka and Donald Jr, as well as the Trump Organization) sued Deutsche Bank, Capital One, his accounting firm Mazars USA, and House Oversight Committee chairman Elijah Cummings, in an attempt to prevent congressional subpoenas revealing information about Trump's finances. On May 20, 2019, DC District Court judge Amit Mehta ruled that Mazars must comply with the subpoena. Trump's attorneys filed notice to appeal to the Court of Appeals for the DC Circuit the next day. On May 22, 2019, judge Edgardo Ramos of the federal District Court in Manhattan rejected the Trump suits against Deutsche Bank and Capital One, ruling the banks must comply with congressional subpoenas.

On October 7, 2019, Judge Victor Marrero of the federal District Court for the Southern District of New York issued a 75-page ruling that Trump must comply with the subpoena and provide his tax returns to a New York grand jury. Minutes later, however, Trump's attorney filed an emergency request with the 2nd US Circuit Court of Appeals, which immediately placed a temporary stay on the subpoena. In November, the Court of Appeals for the Second Circuit upheld the District Court ruling and ordered Trump to turn over his tax returns to Congress. Trump soon appealed to the Supreme Court, which blocked the order by the Second Circuit temporarily.

On February 25, 2021, the House Oversight Committee in the 117th Congress reissued the subpoena to Mazars USA for the same documents it had previously sought.

=== Lawsuits over the January 6 riot ===
Blassingame v. Trump: Two U.S. Capitol police officers sued Trump for allegedly inciting the protests that took over the United States Capitol on January 6, 2021.

Thompson v. Trump: Congressman Bennie Thompson, the NAACP, and 11 other members of the U.S. House of Representatives sued Trump in February 2021 for allegedly conspiring to incite the deadly violence.

Swalwell v. Trump: Congressman Eric Swalwell filed a lawsuit against Trump, his son Donald Trump Jr., and two others of violating federal civil rights laws and local incitement laws after they spoke at a rally near the White House on January 6 before members of the crowd moved on to the Capitol.

In January 2023, a federal judge denied a request by Trump to toss out the cases. Trump appealed, arguing he was immune. In December, the federal appeals court rejected his argument. As Trump did not appeal to the Supreme Court by a February 2024 deadline, the lawsuits can proceed. As of April 2024, the cases were consolidated and are now known as Lee v. Trump.

=== Lawsuits over social media ban ===
In July 2021, Trump, who had been banned from the social media platforms after the January 6 United States Capitol attack, brought class action lawsuits against Facebook, Twitter, and Google, private companies whose terms of service their users must agree to. Trump contended that the platforms were basically acting as government agents and violated his free speech rights under the First Amendment when they banned him from posting.

- Twitter: In May 2022, the court dismissed the case against Twitter, ruling that the free speech clause did not apply to Twitter since it was a private company and there was no evidence that it had acted for the government. Trump appealed the dismissal in June. In February 2025, the case was settled with Elon Musk, who had bought Twitter in 2022 and renamed it X in 2023, agreeing to pay Trump's legal fees and $10 million into the nonprofit that will fund Trump's future presidential library.
- Meta: In January 2025, Meta Platforms agreed to pay $25 million to settle the lawsuit against Facebook. Meta owner Mark Zuckerberg has lobbied Trump to settle the ongoing antitrust lawsuit FTC v. Meta which aims to force Meta to sell Instagram and WhatsApp.
- Google: Lawyers for Google and Trump have asked the court for a continuance until September 2, 2025, to "come to an agreement on a path forward". The Justice Department's lawsuit against Google for having a monopoly on online searches is ongoing; the Justice Department also wants Google to sell its Chrome browser.

=== Trump's racketeering lawsuit against Hillary Clinton, the DNC, and others ===
On March 24, 2022, Trump sued Hillary Clinton, the Democratic National Committee (DNC) and 26 others, alleging that they "maliciously conspired to weave a false narrative that their Republican opponent, Donald J Trump, was colluding with a hostile foreign sovereignty [Russia]" during the 2016 presidential election, and that Trump had lost at least $24 million as a result. In the RICO lawsuit, he asked for a jury trial and $72 million in damages.

In September, U.S. district judge Donald M. Middlebrooks dismissed the suit, stating that it "ignored existing laws, U.S. Supreme Court precedent, and basic legal theory". The judge also wrote in a footnote that Trump had the lawsuit filed in the federal courthouse in Fort Pierce, Florida, which has only one federal judge, district judge Aileen Cannon, a Trump appointee. Trump appealed the decision on October 11.

On November 2, Clinton and the other defendants filed a motion in the district court asking for sanctions against Trump's attorneys and to make Trump pay their legal bills of more than $1 million. On January 19, 2023, judge Middlebrooks sanctioned Trump and his attorney, Alina Habba, $938,000 to cover the legal costs for the 31 defendants Trump cited in the suit. Middlebrooks wrote, in part:

Here, we are confronted with a lawsuit that should never have been filed, which was completely frivolous, both factually and legally, and which was brought in bad faith for an improper purpose. Mr. Trump is a prolific and sophisticated litigant who is repeatedly using the courts to seek revenge on political adversaries. He is the mastermind of strategic abuse of the judicial process, and he cannot be seen as a litigant blindly following the advice of a lawyer.

On February 3, 2023, Trump offered to post a $1.03 million bond to appeal the judgment. On February 27, 2024, Trump filed an appeal with the 11th U.S. Circuit Court of Appeals, asking to remove the sanctions and reinstate the original lawsuit.

=== Lawsuit against Capital One ===
In March 2025, the Trump Organization and Eric Trump sued Capital One, alleging that Capital One had illegally closed over 300 Trump-affiliated accounts for political reasons. In a filing seeking to dismiss the case, Capital One stated that it closed the Trump Organization's accounts after a months-long analysis by the bank's anti-money laundering unit. According to Reuters, this marks "the first time a bank has formally tied money laundering concerns to U.S. President Donald Trump's family business".

=== Lawsuit against the Internal Revenue Service ===
On January 29, 2026, Donald Trump, his two sons, Eric and Donald Trump Jr. and their business, the Trump Organization filed a lawsuit in the Southern District of Florida against the IRS and the Treasury Department. The lawsuit claims the plaintiffs suffered "reputational and financial harm" and "public embarrassment" over the leaking of Trump's tax returns. The lawsuit is seeking at least $10 billion in damages.

== Investigations ==
=== Mueller Special Counsel investigation ===
The Special Counsel investigation is a United States law enforcement investigation of Donald Trump's 2016 presidential campaign and any Russian (or other foreign) interference in the election, including exploring any possible links or coordination between Trump's campaign and the Russian government, "and any matters that arose or may arise directly from the investigation." Since May 2017, the investigation has been led by a United States Special Counsel, Robert Mueller, a former director of the Federal Bureau of Investigation (FBI). Mueller's investigation took over several FBI investigations including those involving former campaign chairman Paul Manafort and former national security advisor Michael Flynn.

It has been noted that Trump has experienced a high turnover with respect to the attorneys handling this matter, as well as a large number of prominent lawyers and law firms publicly declining offers to join Trump's legal team.

On March 22, 2019, Mueller concluded his investigation and gave the final report to Attorney General William Barr. On March 24, Barr sent a four-page letter to Congress summarizing the findings of the report. The report writes that the investigation "identified numerous links between the Russian government and the Trump campaign", found that Russia "perceived it would benefit from a Trump presidency" and that the 2016 Trump presidential campaign "expected it would benefit electorally" from Russian hacking efforts. However, ultimately "the investigation did not establish that members of the Trump campaign conspired or coordinated with the Russian government in its election interference activities".

On the question of obstruction of justice, Barr stated that Mueller did not reach a conclusion; he quotes the special counsel as saying "while this report does not conclude that the President committed a crime, it also does not exonerate him." Barr wrote, "The special counsel's decision to describe the facts of his obstruction investigation without reaching any legal conclusions leaves it to the attorney general to determine whether the conduct described in the report constitutes a crime," adding that he and Rosenstein "concluded that the evidence developed during the special counsel's investigation is not sufficient to establish that the president committed an obstruction-of-justice offense."

=== House Oversight Committee investigation and subpoenas ===
In April 2019, the House Oversight Committee issued subpoenas seeking financial details from Trump's banks, Deutsche Bank and Capital One, and his accounting firm, Mazars USA. In response, Trump sued the banks, Mazars, and committee chair Elijah Cummings to prevent the disclosures. In May, DC District Court judge Amit Mehta ruled that Mazars must comply with the subpoena, and judge Edgardo Ramos of the Southern District Court of New York ruled that the banks must also comply. Trump's attorneys appealed the rulings, arguing that Congress was attempting to usurp the "exercise of law-enforcement authority that the Constitution reserves to the executive branch". The documents were surrendered in September 2022, after Trump agreed to discontinue his appeal.

=== Inaugural committee ===
The New York Times reported in December 2018 that federal prosecutors in Manhattan and Brooklyn are investigating whether Middle Eastern foreigners sought to buy influence over American policies by using straw donors to illegally funnel donations to Trump's inaugural committee and a pro-Trump Super PAC.

The Trump inaugural committee received a subpoena from federal prosecutors on February 4, 2019. The SDNY subpoena demanded a comprehensive array of documents involving the committee's donors, finances, attendees and activities. The subpoena reportedly covered allegations of conspiracy to defraud the United States government, money laundering, false statements, mail and wire fraud, disclosure violations and prohibitions against contributions by foreign nations.

=== Donald J. Trump Foundation ===
During the 2016 U.S. presidential election, media began reporting in detail on how the Donald J. Trump Foundation was funded and how Donald Trump used its funds. The Washington Post in particular reported several cases of possible misuse, self-dealing and possible tax evasion.

Regarding the various irregularities in the Trump Foundation, former head of the Internal Revenue Service's Office of Exempt Organizations Division Marc Owens told The Washington Post that he was surprised by the "laundry list of issues".

The office of New York State Attorney General Eric Schneiderman investigated the foundation "to make sure it's complying with the laws governing charities in New York." The Trump Foundation was found to have committed fraud and to have misappropriated funds, and was ordered to be shut down.

=== Controversy over tax returns ===
In October 2016, The New York Times published some tax documents from 1995. Trump claimed on his tax returns that he lost money, but did not recognize it in the form of canceled debts. Trump might have performed a stock-for-debt swap. This would have allowed Trump to avoid paying income taxes for at least 18 years. An audit of Trump's tax returns for 2002 through 2008 was "closed administratively by agreement with the I.R.S. without assessment or payment, on a net basis, of any deficiency." Tax attorneys believe the government may have reduced what Trump was able to claim as a loss without requiring him to pay any additional taxes. It is unknown whether the I.R.S. challenged Trump's use of the swaps because he has not released his tax returns. Trump's lawyers advised against Trump using the equity for debt swap, as they believed it to be potentially illegal.

After a protracted legal battle against subpoenas to release his tax returns, including two appeals to the United States Supreme Court, in February 2021 the high court permitted the records to be released to prosecutors and a grand jury.

=== Campaign contributions ===
According to a New York state report, Trump circumvented corporate and personal campaign donation limits in the 1980s – although he did not break any laws – by donating money to candidates from 18 different business subsidiaries, rather than giving primarily in his own name. Trump told investigators he did so on the advice of his lawyers. He also said the contributions were not to curry favor with business-friendly candidates, but simply to satisfy requests from friends.

=== Georgia 2020 election investigation ===
Trump is facing a state and federal investigation in the state of Georgia regarding his efforts to reverse his loss there in the 2020 election. In a phone call, Trump pressured Brad Raffensperger, the Georgia Secretary of State, to change the state's election results. Trump is reportedly at risk for charges including Criminal Solicitation to Commit Election Fraud, Intentional Interference with Performance of Election Duties, Conspiracy to Commit Election Fraud, Criminal Solicitation, Racketeering, and a dozen other statutes. On November 18, 2022, the federal investigation was subsumed in the Smith special counsel investigation.

=== United States 2020 election investigation ===
The Department of Justice (DOJ) is probing Trump's months-long efforts to overturn the 2020 election. By March 2022, the DOJ had seated several grand juries, including one regarding the fake electors scheme, to help prosecutors decide whether to bring charges against Trump's inner circle.

=== New York investigations of The Trump Organization ===
An investigation in the state of New York, examining the business dealings of the Trump Organization. The investigation is probing possible loan fraud and tax fraud. Mark Pomerantz, an attorney with extensive experience in prosecuting white-collar and organized crime as the former head of the criminal division in the Manhattan U.S. attorney's office, joined the investigation as a special assistant district attorney on February 2, 2021. Trump's legal team argued that while he was president, he was not required to respond to subpoenas, which delayed investigations and resulted in court cases such as Trump v. Vance. On May 18, 2021, New York Attorney General Letitia James announced that her office would be pursuing the case "in a criminal capacity", upgrading from a formerly civil investigation. On October 20, 2021, the district attorney of Westchester County announced a criminal investigation into The Trump Organization. The charges could include Grand Larceny in the first degree, Insurance fraud in the first degree, Criminal Tax Fraud in the first degree, Falsifying business records in the first degree, Scheme to defraud in the first degree, and Enterprise Corruption. On September 21, 2022, James filed a civil lawsuit against Trump, the Trump Organization, and three of Trump's adult children, alleging fraud and misrepresentation. On December 6, 2022, The Trump Organization would be convicted of 17 criminal charges. Among its two corporate entities, the Trump Corporation would be convicted of nine criminal charges, while the Trump Payroll Corporation would be convicted of eight criminal charges.

On February 16, 2024, New York Supreme Court Justice Arthur Engoron ruled that four of the defendants in New York's civil case against the Trump Organization (Donald Trump, Eric Trump, Donald Trump Jr., and Allen Weisselberg) be required to pay a total of $364 million, with Donald Trump being ordered to pay $355 million. Donald Trump Jr. and Eric Trump were ordered pay $4 million each, while Allen Weisselberg was ordered to pay $1 million Engoron also barred Donald Trump for three years from serving in top roles at any New York company, including his own Trump Organization, while his two older sons, including de facto Trump Organization head Eric Trump, were barred for two years. On March 25, 2024, the required payment for Donald Trump was lowered to $175 million, and was required to be paid within a 10-day deadline. Trump would post the bond on April 1, 2024, thus ensuring that his assets and properties could not be seized until at least the time he finished appealing the verdict. On August 21, 2025, the appeals court upheld Trump's liability but voided the penalty as excessive.

=== FBI search of Mar-a-Lago ===
On August 8, 2022, the Federal Bureau of Investigation (FBI) executed a search warrant at Mar-a-Lago. The search focused on material Trump brought to his residence when he left the White House. The agents took 26 boxes of material and documents; eleven sets of documents were classified as confidential, secret, or top secret, including sensitive compartmented information. Trump was at Trump Tower in New York City during the search.

On November 18, 2022, the White House documents investigation was subsumed into the Smith special counsel investigation.

=== January 6 Committee ===
On October 13, 2022, members of the U.S. House of Representatives January 6 Committee unanimously voted on live television to subpoena Trump to testify about the January 6, 2021, attack on the U.S. Capitol. In a 14-page letter reply, Trump remained defiant. On October 21, 2022, the committee formally issued the subpoena, demanding that he hand over documents by November 4 and provide testimony by November 14. Trump did not do so.

On December 19, 2022, the Committee voted unanimously to refer Trump and the lawyer John Eastman to the U.S. Department of Justice for prosecution. Recommended charges for Trump included obstruction of an official proceeding; conspiracy to defraud the United States; conspiracy to make a false statement; and attempts to "incite," "assist" or "aid or comfort" an insurrection. The Department of Justice had previously on November 18, 2022, transferred the investigation to the Smith special counsel investigation.

On August 1, 2023, a grand jury indicted Trump in the District of Columbia U.S. District Court on four charges for his conduct following the 2020 presidential election through the January 6 Capitol attack: conspiracy to defraud the United States under Title 18 of the United States Code, obstructing an official proceeding and conspiracy to obstruct an official proceeding under the Sarbanes–Oxley Act of 2002, and conspiracy against rights under the Enforcement Act of 1870. The indictment mentioned six unnamed co-conspirators. It is Trump's third indictment and the first indictment against a U.S. president concerning actions while in office. Trump appeared at an arraignment on August 3, where he pleaded not guilty. The charge with the longest sentence carries a maximum of 20 years in prison.

On February 2, 2024, Judge Tanya Chutkan said she would not schedule a trial until the DC Circuit Court of Appeals decided whether Trump was immune from prosecution. After that court unanimously ruled that Trump was not immune, Trump appealed to the U.S. Supreme Court, which ruled on July 1 that former presidents have "some immunity from criminal prosecution" for their "official acts" made during their presidency. As a result, on August 27, the special counsel issued a superseding indictment that maintained the same four charges but omitted some specific allegations.

=== IRS audit ===
As of May 2024, an ongoing IRS audit found Trump allegedly double-dipped on tax losses from his Chicago skyscraper, which could cost him upwards of $100 million in back taxes and penalties.

== Use of bankruptcy laws ==
Trump has never filed for personal bankruptcy, but hotel and casino businesses of his have been declared bankrupt six times between 1991 and 2009 to re-negotiate debt with banks and owners of stock and bonds. Because the businesses used Chapter 11 bankruptcy, they were allowed to operate while negotiations proceeded. Trump was quoted by Newsweek in 2011 saying, "I do play with the bankruptcy laws – they're very good for me" as a tool for trimming debt. These types of bankruptcies are common in the business world for restructuring to avoid having to close a business. In the case of Trump's bankruptcies, three were tied directly to gaming industry, which as a whole had suffered during the time the bankruptcies were declared.

According to a report by Forbes in 2011, the four bankruptcies were the result of over-leveraged hotel and casino businesses in Atlantic City: Trump's Taj Mahal (1991), Trump Plaza Hotel (1992), Trump Hotels and Casino Resorts (2004), and Trump Entertainment Resorts (2009). Trump said "I've used the laws of this country to pare debt.... We'll have the company. We'll throw it into a chapter. We'll negotiate with the banks. We'll make a fantastic deal. You know, it's like on The Apprentice. It's not personal. It's just business." He indicated that many "great entrepreneurs" do the same.

=== 1991 ===
In 1991, Trump Taj Mahal was unable to service its debt and filed Chapter 11 bankruptcy. Forbes indicated that this first bankruptcy was the only one where Trump's personal financial resources were involved. Time, however, maintains that $72 million of his personal money was also involved in a later 2004 bankruptcy.

=== 1992 ===
On November 2, 1992, the Trump Plaza Hotel filed Chapter 11 bankruptcy, and Trump lost his 49 percent stake in the luxury hotel to Citibank and five other lenders. In return Trump received more favorable terms on the remaining $550+ million owed to the lenders, and retain his position as chief executive, though he would not be paid and would not have a role in day-to-day operations.

=== 2004 ===
Donald Trump's third corporate bankruptcy was on October 21, 2004, involving Trump Hotels & Casino Resorts, the publicly traded holding company for his three Atlantic City casinos and some others. Trump lost over half of his 56% ownership and gave bondholders stock in exchange for surrendering part of the debt. No longer CEO, Trump retained a role as chairman of the board. In May 2005 the company emerged from bankruptcy as Trump Entertainment Resorts Holdings. In his 2007 book, Think BIG and Kick Ass in Business and Life, Trump wrote: "I figured it was the bank's problem, not mine. What the hell did I care? I actually told one bank, 'I told you you shouldn't have loaned me that money. I told you the goddamn deal was no good.'"

=== 2009 ===
Trump's fourth corporate bankruptcy occurred in 2009, when Trump and his daughter Ivanka resigned from the board of Trump Entertainment Resorts; four days later the company, which owed investors $1.74 billion against its $2.06 billion of assets, filed for Chapter 11 bankruptcy. At that time, Trump Entertainment Resorts had three properties in Atlantic City: Trump Taj Mahal, Trump Plaza Hotel and Casino (closed in 2014), and Trump Marina (formerly Trump's Castle, sold in 2011). Trump and some bondholders made a $225 million bid to maintain control of the company in 2010. As part of the agreement, Trump withdrew a $100 million lawsuit he had filed against the casino's owners alleging damage to the Trump brand. Trump re-negotiated the debt, reducing by over $1 billion the repayments required to bondholders.

In 2014, Trump sued his former company to remove his name from the buildings since he no longer ran the company, having no more than a 10% stake; he lost the suit. Trump Entertainment Resorts filed again for bankruptcy in 2014 and was purchased by billionaire philanthropist Carl Icahn in 2016, who acquired Trump Taj Mahal in the deal.

== Other allegations ==
=== Allegations of business links to organized crime ===
Trump maintained a connection with organized crime members to supply the concrete for Trump Tower. According to former New York mobster Michael Franzese, "the mob controlled all the concrete business in the city of New York," and that while Trump was not "in bed with the mob ... he certainly had a deal with us. ... he didn't have a choice." Mafia-connected union boss John Cody supplied Trump with concrete in exchange for giving his mistress a high-level apartment with a pool, which required extra structural reinforcement. Trump admitted in 2014 that he had "had no choice" but to work with "concrete guys who are mobbed up." He further stated that "I don't like getting close to people like that, but they respected me."

Journalists David Cay Johnston and Wayne Barrett, the latter of whom wrote an unauthorized 1992 Trump biography, have claimed that Trump and his companies did business with New York and Philadelphia families linked to the Italian-American Mafia. A reporter for The Washington Post writes, "he was never accused of illegality, and observers of the time say that working with the mob-related figures and politicos came with the territory."

Trump helped a financier for the Scarfo family get a casino license, and constructed a casino using firms controlled by Nicodemo Scarfo. Trump also bought real estate from Philadelphia crime family member Salvatore Testa, and bought concrete from companies associated with the Genovese crime family and the Gambino crime family. Trump Plaza paid a $450,000 fine leveled by the Casino Gaming Commission for giving $1.6 million in rare automobiles to Robert LiButti, the acquaintance of John Gotti already mentioned.

Starting in 2003, the Trump Organization worked with Felix Sater, who had a 1998 racketeering conviction for a $40 million stock fraud scheme orchestrated by the Russian mafia, and who had then become an informant against the mafia. Trump's attorney has said that Sater worked with Trump scouting real estate opportunities, but was never formally employed.

=== Destruction of documents ===
In June 2016, a USA Today article reported that Donald Trump and his companies have been deleting emails and other documents on a large scale, including evidence in lawsuits, sometimes in defiance of court orders and under subpoena since as early as 1973. In October 2016, Kurt Eichenwald published new research findings in Newsweek. The findings were first published by Paul Singer on June 13, 2016 and gained larger attention after a new report in Newsweek on October 31, 2016. According to Newsweek, Trump and his companies "hid or destroyed thousands of documents" involving several court cases from as early as 1973.

"Over the course of decades, Donald Trump's companies have systematically destroyed or hidden thousands of emails, digital records and paper documents demanded in official proceedings, often in defiance of court orders.... In each instance, Trump and entities he controlled also erected numerous hurdles that made lawsuits drag on for years, forcing courtroom opponents to spend huge sums of money in legal fees as they struggled—sometimes in vain—to obtain records."

In 1973, Trump, his father and their company were in court for civil charges for refusing to rent apartments to African Americans. After their lawyers had delayed court requests for documents for several months, Trump, then being under subpoena, said his company had destroyed corporate records of the past six months "for saving space". In a court case beginning in 2005 against Power Plant Entertainment, LLC, an affiliate of real estate developer Cordish Cos., it was revealed that Trump's companies had deleted the data requested by court. Cordish Cos. had built two American Indian casinos in Florida under the Hard Rock brand and Donald Trump accused them of cheating him out of that deal. Nonetheless, Trump's lawyers had refused to instruct workers to keep all records related to the case during litigation. Trump had established a procedure to delete all data from their employees' computers every year at least since 2003, despite knowing at least since 2001 that he might want to file a lawsuit. Even after the lawsuit was filed, Trump Hotels disposed of a computer of a key witness without having made a backup of the data. A former general counsel of the Trump Casino unit confirmed that all data were deleted from nearly all companies' computers annually. Trump and his lawyers claimed they were not keeping records and digital data although it was revealed that Trump had launched his own high-speed internet provider in 1998 and an IBM Domino server had been installed for emails and digital files in 1999.

In August 2022, Axios published photographs, taken while Trump was president, of paper with Trump's handwriting torn into pieces and thrown in toilets, possible evidence of violations of Presidential Records Act.

=== Unpaid security bills ===
In August 2024, NBC Montana reported that local governments have invoiced him for police presence at his campaign stops, and that some of these invoices remained unpaid. Later, a number of sources reported that Trump's campaign still owed multiple cities and counties for police protection costs related to his rallies, with some municipalities considering legal action to recover the unpaid bills. Among the cities that have filed or are considering lawsuits against Trump and his campaign over unpaid security bills are Albuquerque, New Mexico; Prescott Valley, Arizona; Green Bay, Wisconsin; and Erie, Pennsylvania.

== See also ==
- Legal challenges to Executive Order 13768
- Legal challenges to Executive Order 13769
- Post-election lawsuits related to the 2020 United States presidential election
- Legal affairs of the first Donald Trump presidency
- Legal affairs of the second Donald Trump presidency
- Indictments against Donald Trump
- Business projects of Donald Trump in Russia
