= Federal prosecution of Donald Trump =

Federal prosecution of Donald Trump or United States v. Trump may refer to:

- Federal prosecution of Donald Trump (classified documents case), indicted June 2023 on 40 document handling charges, Trump removed in November 2024
- Federal prosecution of Donald Trump (election obstruction case) (including his involvement in the January 6 U.S. Capitol attack), indicted August 2023 on four election interference charges, case dismissed in November 2024

== See also ==
- Indictments against Donald Trump, a summary of formal charges
- Prosecution of Donald Trump in New York, state case against Trump regarding false business records, hush money, and election interference
- Georgia election racketeering prosecution, state case against Trump regarding election interference
- Trial of Donald Trump, also including impeachments and civil cases
- Trump v. United States (2022), case by Trump against the federal government related to the appointment of a special master in the case involving classified documents
- Trump v. United States, 2024 case by Trump against the federal government related to whether the office of the president has immunity from prosecution
- Presidency of Donald Trump, associated topics
