= Trump University =

Unaccredited for-profit US education company (2005–2011)

- Type: Private
- Industry: For-profit education
- Founded: May 23, 2005; 21 years ago
- Founder: Donald Trump
- Defunct: 2011
- Headquarters: New York City, U.S
- Website: trumpinitiative.com/

Trump University (also known as the Trump Wealth Institute and Trump Entrepreneur Initiative LLC) was an American company that was founded in 2004 by Donald Trump and his associates Michael Sexton and Jonathan Spitalny. It offered courses in real estate, asset management, entrepreneurship, and wealth creation. Its real estate training program ran from 2005 to 2010. It was owned and operated by the Trump Organization. A separate organization, Trump Institute, was licensed by Trump University but not owned by the Trump Organization. In 2011, amid multiple investigations, lawsuits and student complaints, it ceased operations.

Despite its name, the organization was not an accredited university or college. It conducted three- and five-day seminars (often called "retreats") and used high-pressure tactics to sell them to its customers. It did not confer college credit, grant degrees, or grade its students. In 2011, the company became the subject of an inquiry by the New York attorney general's office for illegal business practices, which resulted in a lawsuit filed in August 2013. An article in National Review called the organization a "massive scam".

Trump University was also the subject of two class actions in federal court. The lawsuits centered on allegations that Trump University defrauded its students by using misleading marketing practices and engaging in aggressive sales tactics. The company and the lawsuits against it received renewed interest due to Trump's candidacy in the 2016 presidential election. Despite repeatedly insisting he would not settle, Trump settled all three lawsuits in November 2016 for a total of $25 million after being elected president.

== History ==
Michael Sexton created a business plan for a real estate training program and presented it to Donald Trump, looking to pay Trump a flat fee for the use of his name. Trump instead decided he wanted to be the principal owner.

Trump University was incorporated in 2004 by Trump, Sexton, and Spitalny, as a New York limited liability company. Trump owned 93% of the company. On May 23, 2005, Trump University formally launched its education program. At the opening presentation, Trump said, "If I had a choice of making lots of money or imparting lots of knowledge, I think I'd be as happy to impart knowledge as to make money." According to The Washington Post, part of the school sales pitch was, "the billionaire had made enough money for himself. Now, he would put his famous brain to work for the little guy". High prices were charged for seminars and programs not to enrich Trump, but so that (as one teacher explained to students) "you assume personal responsibility for doing the work".

The company's original business plan focused on online education, but quickly expanded to include live, in-person instruction. The instruction's focus was real estate investing, with Trump claiming in advertisements: "I can turn anyone into a successful real estate investor, including you." Instruction typically began with an introductory seminar in rented space such as a hotel ballroom. At the introductory seminar, students were urged to sign up for additional classes, ranging from $1,495 seminars to a $35,000 "Gold Elite" program. Records indicate 7,611 tickets were sold to customers attending courses. About 6,000 of these were for a $1,500 3-day course, and 1,000 were for silver, gold or elite mentored courses ranging in price from $10,000 to $35,000. While not licensed as a college or using student loans, the operation used many of the same tactics as predatory colleges: preying on vulnerable populations, implying that the school offered a fast track to financial security, and creating the impression that the recruiter is a friendly advisor.

Trump claimed that students gave the program 98% favorable reviews, but according to some former students, Trump University employees pressured students to give favorable reviews, told them they had to fill out the forms to obtain graduation certificates, and did not undertake procedures often used to ensure that surveys were filled out objectively.

In an infomercial, Trump said he "hand-picked" Trump University's instructors. But in a 2012 deposition, he testified that he never selected the instructors. According to Sexton, Trump signed off on the school's advertisements. For a time in 2008, it used the name "Trump Wealth Institute". In June 2010, Trump University changed its name to "The Trump Entrepreneur Initiative". It largely ceased operations in 2010.

The Trump Institute was a separate business. It was licensed by Trump University, and Trump received a cut of every seat sold, but Trump University owned no part of it. It was owned and operated by Irene and Mike Milin of Boca Raton, Florida. It offered real estate seminars from 2006 to 2009, at which point the licensing agreement expired and was not renewed. Trump was not involved in the operation of the Trump Institute, but he recorded a broadcast infomercial promoting it and appeared in an introductory video before each seminar.

== Allegations of impropriety and lawsuits ==
External videos
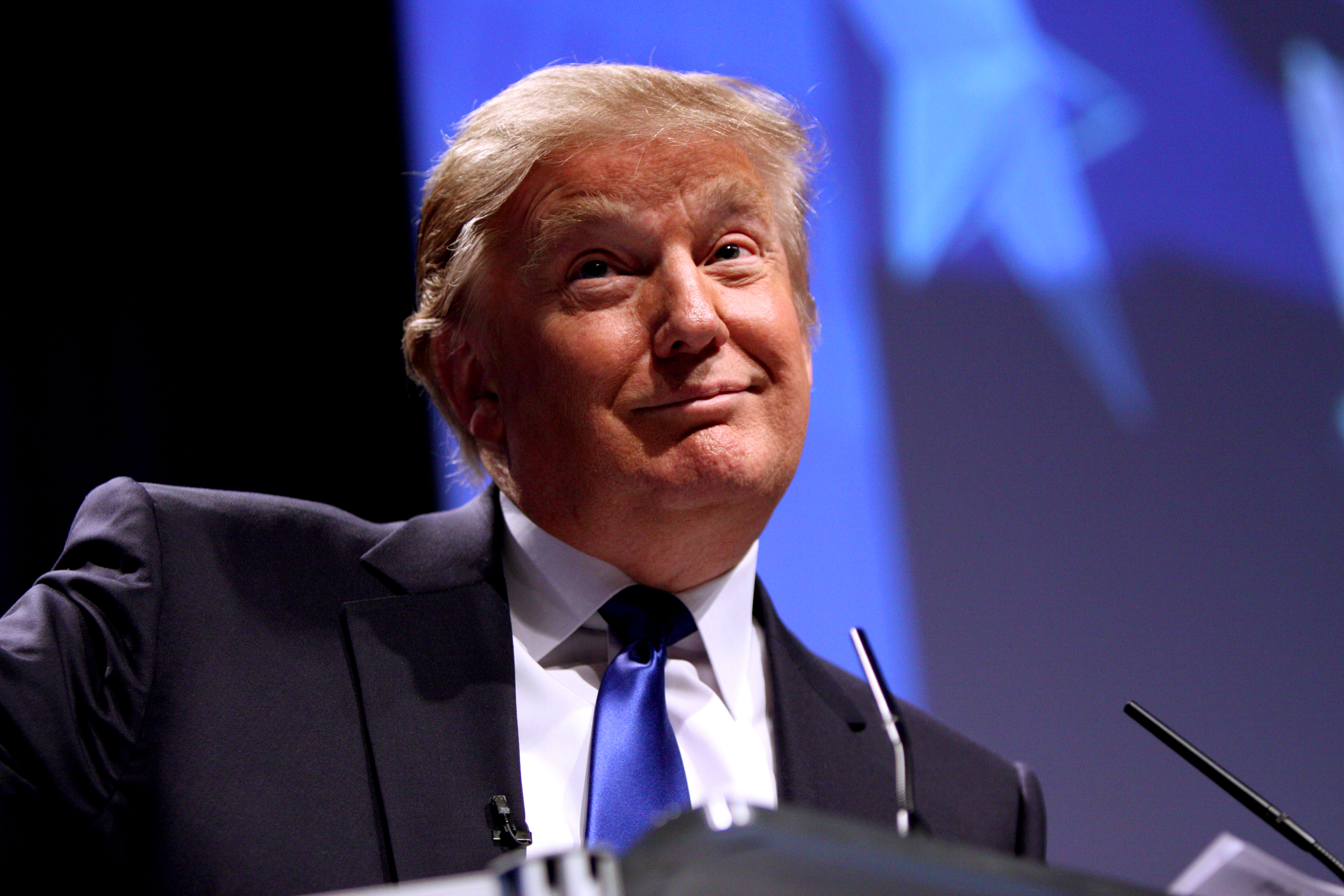
- Is Trump University a fraud?, 5:28, CNN, September 29, 2015
- Trump faces lawsuits from former Trump University students, 5:47, CBS This Morning, September 24, 2015
- Prosecutor: Trump lawsuit no stunt, 3:55, CNN, August 26, 2013
- Trump, Rubio spar over lawsuit against Trump University, 4:53, Fox News Channel, March 3, 2016

Three lawsuits were filed asserting that Trump University engaged in a variety of illegal business practices, ranging from false claims to racketeering. Two were federal class actions: one against Trump University and its managers, including Trump, and one against Trump personally. A third case was filed in New York State court.

=== New York v. Trump Entrepreneur Initiative LLC ===
In 2005, the New York State Department of Education sent Trump, Sexton, and Trump University a letter saying that they were violating state law by using the word "university" when Trump University was not actually chartered as one and did not have the required license to offer live instruction or training. Sexton promised that the organization would stop instructing students in New York State, but the New York Attorney General alleged that such instruction continued.

A March 2010 letter Deputy Commissioner for Higher Education Joseph Frey sent to Trump stated: "Use of the word 'university' by your corporation is misleading and violates New York Education Law and the Rules of the Board of Regents." In June 2010, Trump University changed its name to "The Trump Entrepreneur Initiative".

On August 24, 2013, the State of New York filed a $40 million civil suit against Trump University alleging illegal business practices and false claims made by the company. According to a press release from New York Attorney General Eric Schneiderman, the case was to be handled by Assistant Attorneys General Tristan C. Snell and Melvin L. Goldberg, under the supervision of the Bureau of Consumer Frauds and Protection's Deputy Bureau Chief Laura J. Levine, Bureau Chief Jane M. Azia, and Executive Deputy Attorney General for Economic Justice Karla G. Sanchez. Schneiderman described Trump University as a bait-and-switch scheme. He accused Trump of misleading more than 5,000 people to pay up to $35,000 to learn his real estate investment techniques.

Trump denied the allegations, claiming the school had a 98% approval rating, and said Schneiderman was "a political hack looking to get publicity". He filed a complaint alleging that Schneiderman's investigation was accompanied by a campaign donation shakedown; a New York ethics board investigated the complaint and dismissed it in August 2015. Because of strict confidentiality laws, it is unknown whether the complaint was dismissed because Trump's claims were untrue or because Schneiderman's actions did not contravene any ethical rules.

In October 2014, a New York judge found Trump personally liable for operating the company without the required business license.

=== Texas investigation ===
In May 2010, the consumer protection division of the state of Texas sought permission from the office of the Attorney General of Texas to sue Trump University. An investigation by the consumer protection division had found the company was "engaging in false, misleading and deceptive practices" and had defrauded Texas taxpayers out of $2.6 million. According to John Owens, the Texas attorney general's deputy chief of consumer protection at the time, an estimated 267 Texans spent more than $425,000 on the three-day seminars, and 39 purchased Trump's "Gold Elite" package of additional classes and other perks costing $35,000 each. Another 150 customers from Texas spent more than $826,000 on other goods and services. According to the investigation,

The "free workshops" are merely a selling ground for the Defendant Trump U's 3-day seminars and offer little useable content. The training materials we have reviewed indicate that Trump University 3-day seminar attendees are taught to prey upon homeowners in financial turmoil and to target foreclosure properties. ... Defendants falsely assert at these "free workshops" that classes are approved continuing education credit for Realtors, but Trump University courses were not approved by the Texas Real Estate Commission, nor was Trump University an accredited institution with the legal credentials to call itself a "university."

The lawsuit proposed by the consumer protection division sought to recover more than $2.6 million that Texas taxpayers who had been students at the "university" had "spent on seminars and materials, plus another $2.8 million in penalties and fees".

The investigation was dropped and no lawsuit was filed, but Trump University agreed to cease operations in Texas. (The attorney general Greg Abbott went on to become governor, and the deputy chief of consumer protection Owens later alleged that Abbott's decision "not to sue [Trump] was political": Trump later donated $35,000 to Abbott's campaign for governor. Abbott's communications director called the charge "absurd", and Trump University "disputed that its classes were deceptive".)

=== Lawsuits in federal court ===
==== Low v. Trump University, LLC ====
Tarla Makaeff, who paid nearly $60,000 to Trump University in 2008, brought a class action against Trump University on April 30, 2010, in the U.S. District Court for Southern California. The suit, Makaeff v. Trump University, LLC, sought refunds for Makaeff and other former clients of Trump University, as well as punitive damages for breach of contract, fraud, negligent misrepresentation and bad faith. It did not originally name Donald Trump as a defendant, but did so in a later amended complaint. In February 2014, U.S. district court judge Gonzalo P. Curiel denied recognition to the nationwide class the plaintiffs had requested and recognized the suit as class-action on the part of Trump University clients in three states—California, Florida, and New York—based on specific alleged violations of the consumer protection laws of those states. He also narrowed the case to five of the plaintiffs' original 14 charges.

On May 26, 2010, Trump University filed a counterclaim alleging Makaeff had made defamatory statements about Trump University, "including many completely spurious accusations of actual crimes", which caused Trump University losses of more than $1 million. On June 30, 2010, Makaeff countered that Trump University's defamation claim was an attempt to intimidate her, known as a SLAPP suit (a strategic lawsuit against public participation), and that because Trump University is a "public figure" the defamation claim required proof that she "acted with actual malice" when speaking and writing about Trump University. By invoking California's anti-SLAPP statute, Makaeff triggered procedures that hastened consideration of the defamation claim without further discovery.

On August 23, 2010, U.S. district judge Irma E. Gonzalez ruled that Trump University was not a public figure, did not need to show malice on Makaeff's part, and could proceed with its defamation claim. Makaeff appealed to the Ninth Circuit Court of Appeals, where a three-judge panel ruled unanimously on April 17, 2013, that Trump University is a "limited-purpose public figure" that must demonstrate malice on Makaeff's part to establish defamation; it returned the case to the district court to consider the defamation claim against that standard. (Note: The Ninth Circuit noted: "As the recent Ponzi-scheme scandals involving onetime financial luminaries like Bernard Madoff and Allen Stanford demonstrate, victims of con artists often sing the praises of their victimizers until the moment they realize they have been fleeced.") After additional briefing, Judge Curiel ruled in Makaeff's favor on June 16, 2014, and dismissed the defamation claim. At the court's invitation, Makaeff then presented evidence of her legal costs and fees in connection with the defamation litigation. She asked for $1.3 million, and on April 20, 2015, Curiel ordered Trump University to reimburse Makaeff $798,000 in legal fees and costs.

In November 2015, the district court ruled on Trump's motion for summary judgment. In a 44-page opinion, the court denied Trump's motion for summary judgment on most of the claims, finding that there was a genuine issue of fact on plaintiffs' claims of deceptive practices and misrepresentation in advertisements in violation of California, Florida, and New York consumer protection and business law and therefore letting these claims proceed to trial. The court did grant summary judgment in Trump's favor on plaintiffs' request for an injunction, because Trump University stopped enrolling students in July 2010 and no longer sold the same seminars or other programs.

On March 21, 2016, over objections from the attorneys for Trump University, Curiel allowed Makaeff to withdraw as the lead plaintiff, (Note: Makaeff sought to withdraw for financial and health reasons and her attorneys cited the emotional effect of public exposure: "She's now been derided and called out by name on the campaign trail, on Twitter and on the GOP stage." Attorneys for Trump University objected that Makaeff's deposition was central to their defense: "She is the centerpiece to this litigation.") naming Sonny Low (Note: According to a document filed in the case, as of September 26, 2012, Sonny Low was a "71-year old senior citizen ... [who] retired in 2005 as a U.S. Foreign Service Officer who served our country for 34 years".) in her stead, resulting in the case title Low v. Trump University, LLC.

==== Cohen v. Trump ====
On October 18, 2013, California businessman Art Cohen filed a civil suit, Art Cohen v. Donald J. Trump, in the U.S. District Court for Southern California, as a class action on behalf of consumers throughout the United States who purchased services known as "Live Events" from Trump University after January 1, 2007. It alleged violations of the RICO statute, essentially a scheme to defraud. It accused Trump of misrepresenting Trump University "to make tens of millions of dollars" while actually delivering "neither Donald Trump nor a university". The suit named Trump as the sole defendant and sought restitution as well as damages, including punitive and treble damages.

In an order dated October 24, 2014, Judge Curiel certified the class proposed by the plaintiff and ruled that Cohen had presented enough evidence to allow the case to proceed. Alan Garten, general counsel for the Trump Organization, said Trump University would appeal Curiel's ruling, which he said showed a "manifest disregard for the law". In October 2015, Garten also said Trump would ask Curiel to recuse himself because of his "animosity toward Mr. Trump and his views". But Trump's lawyers never filed a motion to recuse, and according to legal experts such a motion would lack legal merit and possibly be considered frivolous.

In May 2016, Curiel set the trial on the suit to begin on November 28, 2016, after the U.S. presidential election, with jury selection several weeks earlier.

In August 2016, the district court denied Trump's motion for summary judgment, ruling that there was sufficient evidence against Trump for the case to go to a jury.

On November 10, 2016, Curiel denied a request by Trump to delay the trial until after his inauguration. At the same time, Curiel urged the parties to work toward a settlement, and both sides accepted an offer from U.S. district judge Jeffrey T. Miller to facilitate such talks.

==== Public release of court documents ====
On May 27, 2016, Curiel granted a request by The Washington Post for public release of certain documents that had been filed in the case. He noted that they were "routine" and many were already publicly available. The released information included "playbooks" documenting instructions for employees to use a hard-sell approach, as well as depositions in which former employees said that Trump University had defrauded or lied to its students.

On August 2, 2016, the court denied a request by The Washington Post and other media organizations for public release of hours of videotaped testimony from Trump's two depositions in Cohen, taken in November 2015 and January 2016. Transcripts of those depositions had already been released, showing "that Trump repeatedly indicated that he had never met instructors at Trump University, despite advertisements for the program indicating that its staff had been hand-picked by the real estate mogul." Trump's attorneys had opposed the requests to release the videotapes. Curiel ruled that there was a legitimate public interest in the content of the deposition, but that interest was satisfied via public release of the transcripts. He also noted that if the videos were publicly released, it was "nigh-inevitable" that the footage would be used in news accounts and political ads, which might prejudice the jury pool pre-trial.

==== Trump's comments about Curiel ====
During primary campaign speeches, Trump repeatedly called the judge a "hater" and described him as "Spanish" or "Mexican" (Curiel was born in Indiana to parents who had immigrated to the U.S. from Mexico). Trump also said Curiel should recuse himself, although his attorneys said they did not plan to ask for the judge to be removed from the case. Curiel's only comment was to write in a procedural ruling that Trump has "placed the integrity of these court proceedings at issue". Trump's references to Curiel's ethnicity, as well as his comments that "someone ought to look into" the judge, alarmed legal experts, who expressed concern about the effects of the comments on judicial independence.

On June 7, 2016, Trump issued a lengthy statement saying his criticism of the judge had been "misconstrued" and that his concerns about Curiel's impartiality were not based upon ethnicity alone, but also upon rulings in the case.

=== Settlement ===
On November 18, 2016, it was reported that Trump had agreed to pay $25 million to settle the two class actions and the New York suit. The settlement was reached 10 days before the San Diego class action was scheduled to go to trial. $21 million went to the participants in the class actions, $3 million to New Yorkers not covered by the class actions, and a penalty of up to $1 million will be assessed by the state of New York for running an unlicensed university. The plaintiffs' attorneys agreed to forgo their fees and work pro bono to maximize the amount that will go to the approximately 7,000 former Trump University students involved in the case. The settlement also specified that Trump, who had previously said he would never settle, did not admit any wrongdoing. The settlement was brokered by U.S. district judge Jeffrey T. Miller, who offered his services to the parties on November 10 at Curiel's request. Curiel approved the settlement on March 31, 2017.

Schneiderman said the settlement and payment by Trump "is a stunning reversal by Donald Trump and a major victory for the over 6,000 victims of his fraudulent university". Trump himself said he settled "for a small fraction of the potential award" because he was too busy as president-elect to take it to trial. He added: "The ONLY bad thing about winning the Presidency is that I did not have the time to go through a long but winning trial on Trump U. Too bad!"

Final payment of the settlement was put on hold because one member of the class opted out of the settlement to pursue an individual claim. A district court and an appeals court rejected that person's claim, and Curiel finalized the settlement in April 2018. Former students can now get a refund of up to 90% of the money they spent on courses.

The settlement was paid not by Trump but by his Las Vegas hotel business partner, billionaire Phil Ruffin. In February 2019, during a meeting of the U.S. House Committee on Oversight and Reform, Representative Jackie Speier suggested "a Kansan", later revealed to be Ruffin, had paid $25 million to satisfy Trump's liability in the Trump University judgment. Ruffin admitted to paying Trump $28 million in 2018, but claimed it was for "back-fees" related to Trump International Hotel Las Vegas and unrelated to the Trump University case.

=== Other investigations ===
In 2010, the office of Texas Attorney General Greg Abbott investigated Trump University. No suit was brought, but after exchanging communications with investigators that included requests from the investigators for customer lists and internal documents, Trump University closed its operations in Texas. These had included newspaper advertising, free presentations, and three-day seminars. Six years later, during the 2016 presidential election, the Associated Press found that Trump had donated $35,000 Abbott's successful campaign for governor in 2014. Texas Monthly questioned whether Abbott had treated Trump with especial favor. Ken Paxton, who succeeded Abbott as Texas Attorney General, sent a cease and desist letter to former Deputy Chief of Consumer Protection John Owens, who said he had been told to drop the case and had forwarded previously undisclosed documents to the Associated Press. Paxton said in a statement that Owens had released "confidential and privileged information". David S. Morales, the Deputy Attorney General in 2010, admitted in 2016 that he had quashed the $5.4 million suit without discussing the issue with Abbott. In 2018, Trump nominated Morales to serve as a judge at the District Court for the Southern District of Texas.

The office of Florida Attorney General Pam Bondi announced in September 2013 that it was considering joining a New York lawsuit against Trump University. Four days later, the Donald J. Trump Foundation donated $25,000 to "And Justice for All", a 527 group supporting Bondi's reelection campaign. After that, Bondi declined to join New York. According to a Bondi spokesman, Bondi had personally solicited the donation from Trump several weeks before her office announced it was considering joining the lawsuit. In March 2016, Citizens for Responsibility and Ethics in Washington (CREW) filed a complaint with the IRS about the potentially illegal donation. In September 2016, it was reported that the donation violated laws against political contributions from nonprofit organizations, and that Trump had reimbursed the foundation with his own money and paid the IRS a $2,500 excise tax as a penalty. Trump denied the donation was connected to the Trump University lawsuit, saying it was for Bondi's performance as Attorney General. The White House announced in November 2019 that Bondi would join its staff temporarily for handling communications about the ongoing impeachment inquiry against Trump, prompting objection from ethics watchdogs.

== Issue in the 2016 presidential election campaign ==
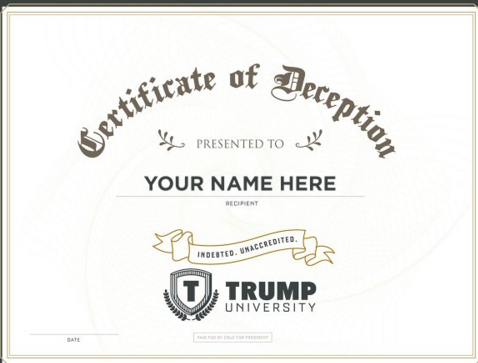
Satirical "personal diploma" from Trump University on Senator Ted Cruz's campaign website during the 2016 Republican primaries

During the 2016 Republican presidential primaries, Trump's opponents used Trump University to criticize him. Mitt Romney said in early March: "Donald Trump is a phony, a fraud. His promises are as worthless as a degree from Trump University." Senators and fellow presidential candidates Ted Cruz and Marco Rubio raised the subject during televised debates in February and March. One debate moderator, Megyn Kelly of Fox News, pursued the issue at length. Trump responded that Trump University was "a small business" and student evaluations were overwhelmingly positive. He said lawsuits were a routine part of business and that he wins most of them. Of one of the class actions, he said: "It's something I could have settled many times. I could settle it right now for very little money, but I don't want to do it out of principle." Hillary Clinton used the Trump University allegations against Trump in speeches and campaign ads.

== In popular culture ==
Trump University was the subject of a week-long series in the comic strip Doonesbury in June 2005.

In the second episode of The Root of All Evil, a sketch makes fun of Trump University.

Trump University was also the butt of jokes in a Will and Grace mini-episode released in September 2016, created to get out the vote for the 2016 presidential election. In it, Karen says she sent her Latina maid, Rosario, to Trump University for a course on "dusting".

== See also ==
- Personal and business legal affairs of Donald Trump
- Legal affairs of Donald Trump (disambiguation)
- List of things named after Donald Trump
