= Timothy L. O'Brien =

American journalist (born 1961)

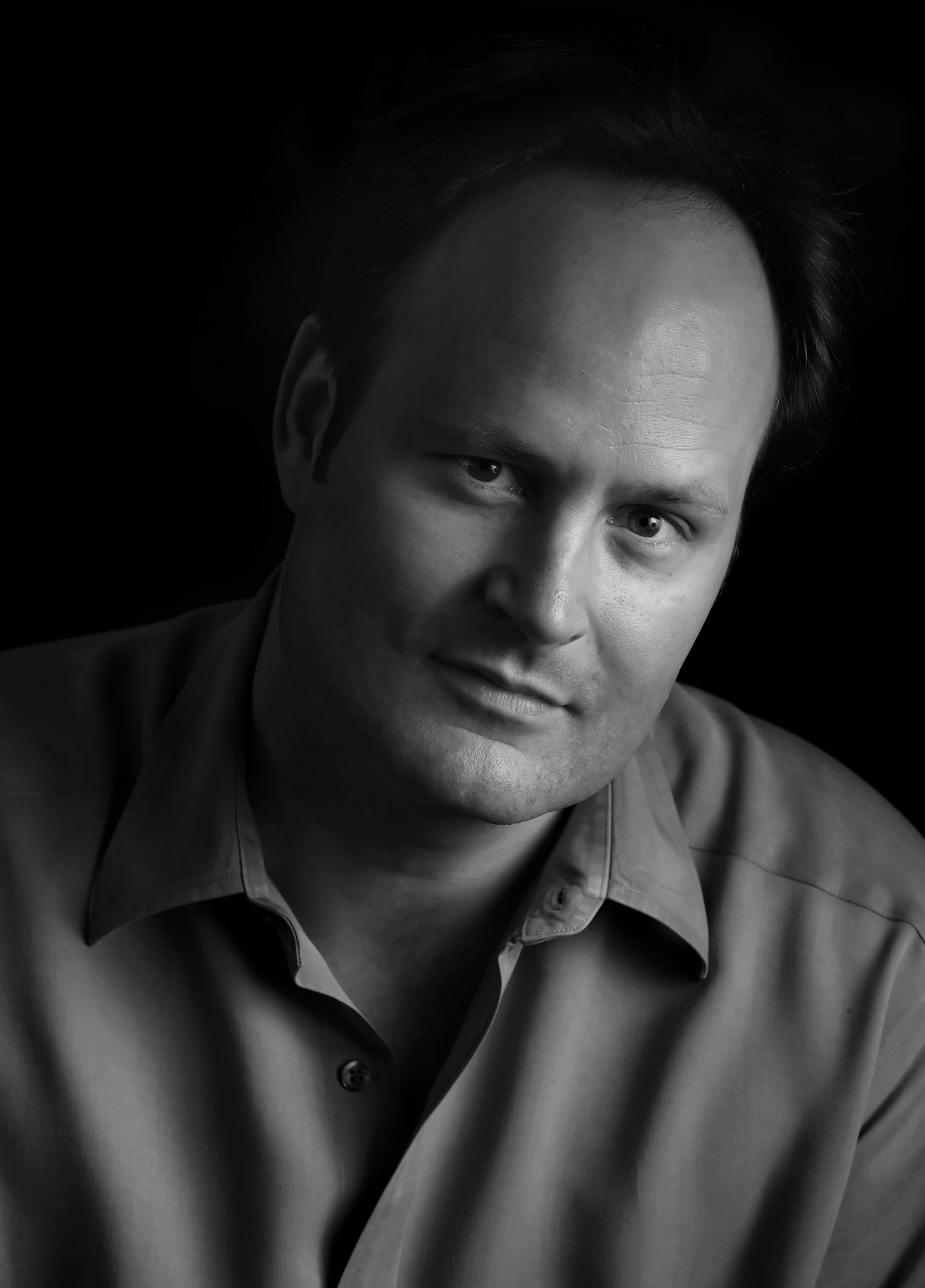
- O'Brien in 2005
- Born: Illinois, United States
- Occupations: Journalist, author

Timothy L. O'Brien (born 1961) is an American journalist, author and television commentator.

== Early life and education ==
Born in Illinois, O'Brien is a graduate of Loyola Academy and Georgetown University, where he studied literature. He has three master's degrees from Columbia University, in history, journalism, and business.

== Journalism career ==
O'Brien is the executive editor of Bloomberg Opinion, a platform that provides commentary about business, politics, and foreign affairs. O'Brien was a reporter for The New York Times before becoming editor of the paper's Sunday Business section in 2006. He was previously the executive editor of The Huffington Post and has been a staff writer for The Wall Street Journal and Talk. O'Brien edited a multi-part series on wounded war veterans that won a Pulitzer Prize for National Reporting in 2012. He is also a recipient of a Loeb Award for Distinguished Business Journalism. He helped oversee a team of New York Times reporters that was a 2009 Pulitzer Prize for Public Service finalist for its coverage of the 2008 financial crisis. O'Brien is also a contributing, on-air analyst with NBC/MSNBC where he frequently appears to discuss politics and national affairs.

=== Books ===
O'Brien has written two nonfiction books: 1998's Bad Bet: The Inside Story of the Glamour, Glitz, and Danger of America's Gambling Industry (ISBN 0-8129-2807-5) and 2005's TrumpNation: The Art of Being the Donald (ISBN 978-1422366189).TrumpNation is notable for its claim that celebrity real estate mogul Donald Trump was worth no more than US$250 million. Trump, who claimed at the time to be a billionaire and who has built a reputation upon his wealth, filed suit against O'Brien and Warner Books in 2006. In 2009, the suit was dismissed by a New Jersey judge. Trump appealed, but the dismissal was upheld by an appeals court in 2011. A novel by O'Brien, The Lincoln Conspiracy (ISBN 978-0-345-49677-5), was published in 2012.

== Political career ==
In 2019, O'Brien was hired as a senior adviser for strategy and policy for Michael Bloomberg's Democratic Party primaries campaign in the 2020 United States presidential election.
