= Jerko =

Jerko is a given name and a surname. Notable people with the name include:

given name

- Jerko Bulić (1924–2008), Yugoslav sprinter
- Jerko Skračić (1918–1945 or 1947), Croatian journalist and poet
- Jerko Ješa Denegri, Serbian art historian and art critic
- Jerko Marinić Kragić (born 1991), Croatian water polo player
- Jerko Leko (born 1980), Croatian football player and manager
- Jerko Ivanković Lijanović (born 1969), Bosnian businessman and politician
- Jerko Matulić (born 1990), Croatian handball player
- Jerko Rukavina (1796–1879), Croatian soldier
- Jerko Tipurić (born 1960), Croatian football player and manager

surname

- Stane Jerko (born 1937), Slovenian fashion photographer

== See also ==
- Jeronim
- Jere (name)
