= Barron Trump =

Youngest son of Donald Trump (born 2006)

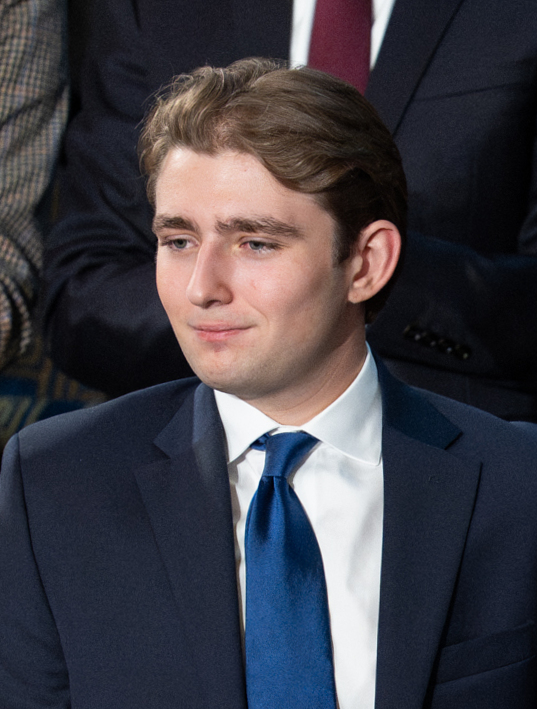
- Trump in 2026
- Born: Barron William Trump; March 20, 2006 (age 20); New York City, New York, U.S.
- Citizenship: United States; Slovenia
- Education: New York University
- Parents: Donald Trump; Melania Trump
- Family: Trump family

Barron William Trump (born March 20, 2006) is the fifth and youngest child of Donald Trump, the 45th and 47th president of the United States, and his only child with his third wife, Melania Trump, which makes him a member of the first family of the United States and the Trump family.

Born in New York City, Barron was an apolitical figure during his father's first presidency, attracting media attention despite his mother's attempts to distance him from politics. Trump demonstrated an interest in soccer during that time, signing for D.C. United Academy as a midfielder.

After his father left the White House, he moved to Florida and graduated in 2024 from Oxbridge Academy in West Palm Beach. Trump was invited to become an at-large delegate for Florida at the 2024 Republican National Convention, but declined. In July 2024, he co-founded a real estate company, which was dissolved after his father was reelected to a second presidency. An increase in Republican votes by young men was credited to Barron's advice to his father's campaign about contacting podcasters and other online influencers.

== Early life and education ==
Barron William Trump was born on March 20, 2006, to Donald Trump and Melania Knauss Trump. He was baptized at the Episcopal Church of Bethesda-by-the-Sea in Palm Beach, Florida. He has four older half-siblings: Donald Trump Jr., Eric Trump, Ivanka Trump and Tiffany Trump. Trump was raised at Trump Tower, where he has a floor of his own, and attended Columbia Grammar and Preparatory School for his primary education. He is of German, Scottish, and Slovene descent.

Upon learning of Barron's conception in August 2005, Donald expressed surprise. Donald has shown a fascination with the name "Barron" or "Baron", calling himself "the Baron" during an affair with Marla Maples, requesting that the writer of a television series based on his real estate career call the main character "Barron", and using the pseudonym "John Barron" since at least 1980. Donald chose Trump's first name, while Melania chose his middle name. Melania has served as Barron's primary parent; according to People, Barron is her priority. In an ABC News interview, she said Barron was "not a sweatpants child", and occasionally dressed as his father while partaking in baseball games, golf events, and tennis lessons.

Trump was present for his father's presidential campaign announcement in June 2015. Donald was elected president in November 2016; Barron and Melania Trump remained in New York for six months after the election out of concern about his public image and school. In a September 2015 interview with People, he expressed reservations about losing friendships if he moved to Washington, D.C. At his father's first inauguration, Trump sat beside his mother. Trump was the first president's son since John F. Kennedy Jr. to reside in the White House. He invited his class to the White House in May 2017. Trump appeared at the White House's Truman Balcony to view the solar eclipse of August 21, 2017. In September, he began attending St. Andrew's Episcopal School, a preparatory school in Potomac, Maryland, that his mother said has a "diverse community and commitment to academic excellence". In February 2020, acting White House chief of staff Mick Mulvaney said Donald frequently talked to Barron.

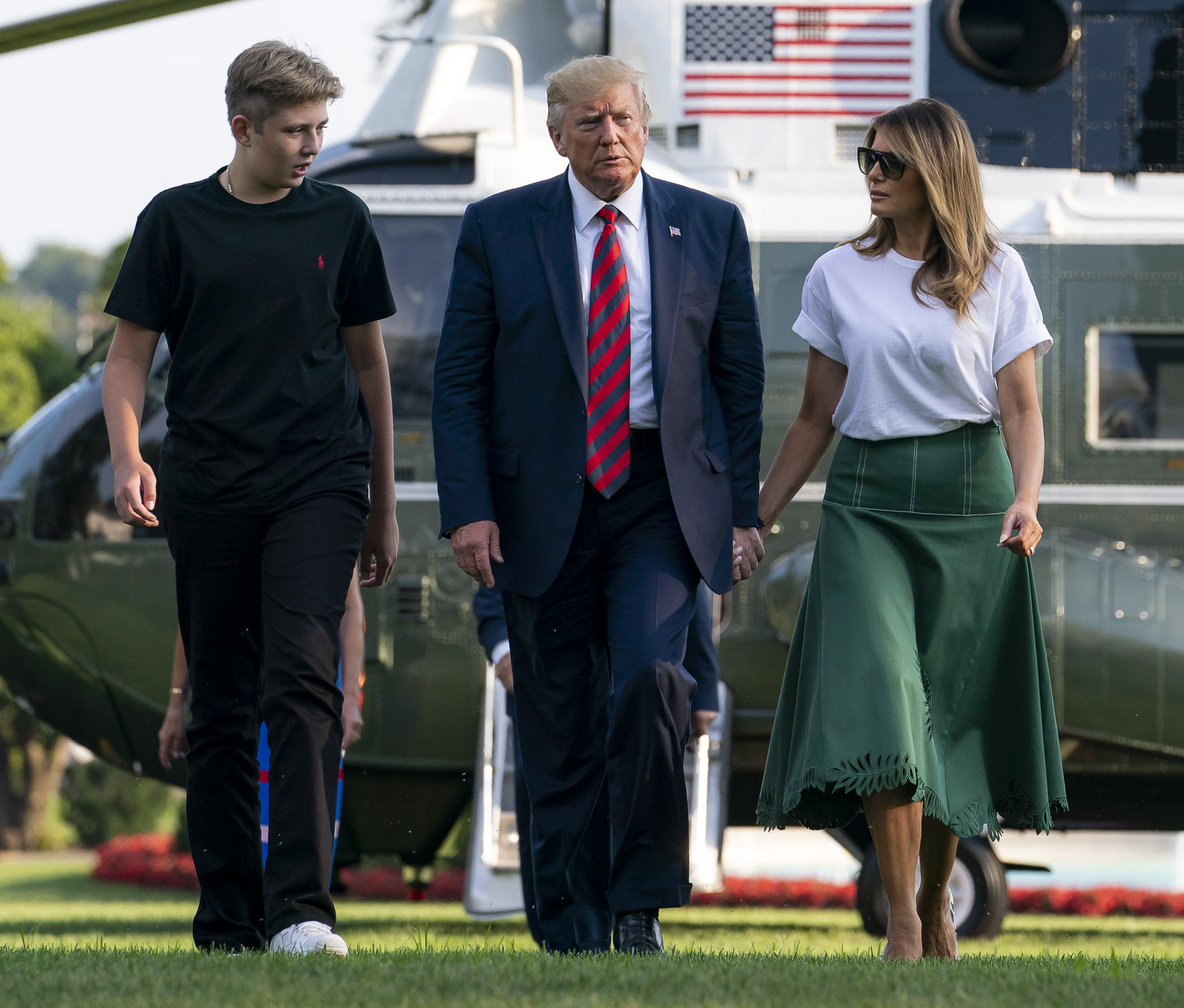
Trump with his parents in 2019

After losing the 2020 presidential election, Donald Trump and his family moved to Mar-a-Lago; at that time, Melania was reportedly "very protective" of Barron. Barron was not present for his father's final speech of his first term. He began attending Oxbridge Academy in West Palm Beach, Florida, in August 2021. He was entitled to Secret Service protection until 2022. Trump graduated from Oxbridge Academy in May 2024, and began attending New York University's Stern School of Business in September 2024 with renewed Secret Service protection. In 2025, Trump began his sophomore year at NYU's Washington campus near the White House.

== Career ==
=== Politics ===
In an interview, Donald said Barron advises him on politics; according to Mollie Hemingway, Barron criticized his father for failing to let Joe Biden speak after a debate in 2020. In March 2024, he attended a meeting with his father and businessmen Elon Musk and Nelson Peltz, according to The Wall Street Journal. In April 2024, Trump was photographed with businessmen Patrick Bet-David and Justin Waller, mixed martial artist Colby Covington, and conservative figure Bo Loudon at Mar-a-Lago. According to Bet-David, Trump invited him. Trump is friends with Loudon, according to The Daily Telegraph. In May, Trump was invited to become an at-large delegate for Florida at the 2024 Republican National Convention, joined by his brothers Eric and Donald Jr. and his sister Tiffany. Trump declined the invitation, citing prior commitments.

Trump appeared at a rally with his father in Doral, Florida, in July 2024. Donald credited him for an interview he conducted with Adin Ross, an online streamer. ABC News described Barron Trump as a podcast advisor to his father. Melania Trump later said he played an important role in garnering young voters for Donald. He was present for his father's victory speech after the 2024 presidential election and his father's second inauguration. At an event at Capital One Arena after the inauguration, his father credited him with suggesting that he appear on an episode of The Joe Rogan Experience. The appearance helped Trump win the election, according to The Guardian and The Times. According to The Daily Telegraph, Trump made several suggestions to his father about appearing with influencers connected to the manosphere.

After being detained in Romania in 2023, the internet personality Andrew Tate said he had talked to Barron about the incident. In December 2025, The New York Times reported that an associate of the Tate brothers, Justin Waller, had said that Barron admired Tate and had spoken with him in 2024 of their belief that his Romanian sex trafficking and rape cases were intended to silence him. Tate was subsequently released from travel restrictions related to his pending criminal trial.

=== Business ===
In July 2024, Trump co-founded Trump, Fulcher & Roxburgh Capital Inc., a real estate company. The company was dissolved after the 2024 presidential election with no plans to reestablish it during the second presidency of Trump's father. By September, he was listed as a "DeFi visionary" for World Liberty Financial; according to The New York Times, Steve Witkoff, a real estate investor with ties to Trump, envisioned Trump's role as a deterrence to memecoins and to give him business experience. The Times later reported that Trump urged his parents to become involved in cryptocurrency. In October 2025, Trump was proposed by his father's former social media manager as a member of the board of directors of TikTok, following its sale to an American company.

In January 2026, Trump was listed as a director of the Sollos yerba mate beverage company. In May, a single pineapple-coconut flavor debuted.

== Public image ==
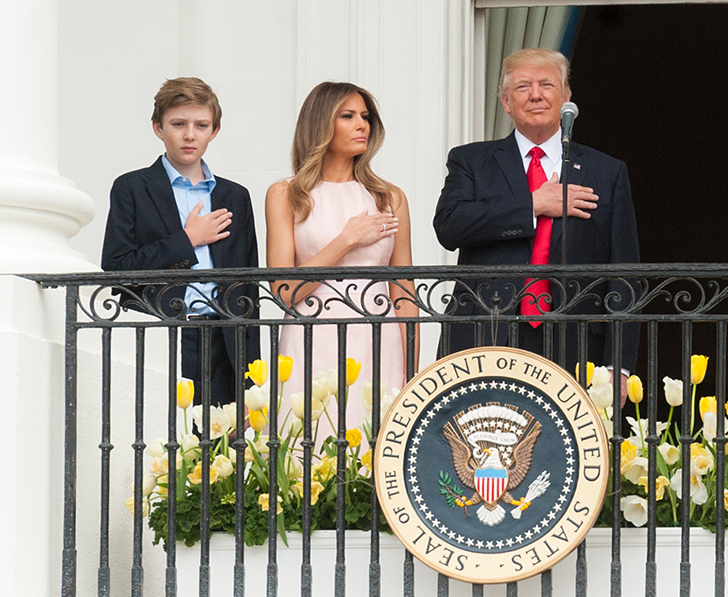
Trump at the 2017 Easter Egg Roll

Trump appeared with Melania on The Oprah Winfrey Show two months after he was born. His mother aimed to keep his father's political career from disrupting their son's life. The Trump administration sought to avert attention from Barron during his education at St. Andrew's Episcopal School. Journalist Kate Andersen Brower argued that criticism of Barron contributed to his family's decision to send him to a school farther from the White House than institutions such as the Sidwell Friends School. The Secret Service protected Trump during his education at St. Andrew's. During the COVID-19 pandemic, St. Andrew's did not reopen.

At a December 2019 rally in Battle Creek, Michigan, Donald said that Barron could visit Central Park and attract a larger audience than Elizabeth Warren. Donald has attested to Barron's apparent knowledge of computers, bringing him to an event in Las Vegas and saying that Barron could have developed an improved HealthCare.gov; Donald recounted Barron's ability to unlock his computer at the Conservative Political Action Conference in 2022.

A video of Trump and his father listening in silence to Taylor Swift's song "Blank Space" went viral in 2014. At a 2018 event for her Be Best campaign, Melania Trump said Barron did not have social media accounts. According to The New York Times in December 2020, over one hundred Twitter accounts were active in Trump's name, excluding profiles labeled as satire. Trump's identity was falsified by a supporter of his father from Mechanicsburg, Pennsylvania, who used a Twitter account in Trump's name to solicit donations for himself. In June 2021, the imposter was indicted by the Federal Bureau of Investigation for fraud and identity theft.

In a trial heard before the Snaresbrook Crown Court in January 2026, phone records indicated that Trump had called the Metropolitan Police in the United Kingdom in January 2025 after witnessing an assault over a video call. The Russian national involved was found guilty of assault occasioning actual bodily harm and perverting the course of justice. In February 2026, Trump appeared with other family members at that year's State of the Union Address, his first public appearance since his father's second inauguration.

In August 2026, the Iranian state media channel Islamic Republic of Iran Broadcasting published a video titled "Where to kill Barron Trump?!", showing locations where Trump is publicly known to spend time and offering a $10 million reward for his assassination; the Secret Service said they were investigating the video.

== Personal life ==
Trump's mother is from Slovenia, and it is believed he can speak Slovene and had a slight Slovene accent as a child, though it was gone by 2024. Melania nicknamed Barron "little Donald". In an interview with People, she said Barron frequently spoke with his maternal grandmother, Amalija Knavs, until her death in January 2024. Trump is a Slovenian citizen and has European Union citizenship; his mother applied for citizenship on his behalf and continued to renew their passports. Melania's parents have taught Barron Slovene songs. Melania's sister, Ines Knauss, is Barron's godmother.

Trump's height has been the subject of speculation. Photographs of Trump at Mar-a-Lago and Knavs's funeral went viral. His father has said he is 6 ft 7 in (2.01 m) or 6 ft 8 in (2.03 m).

=== Sports ===
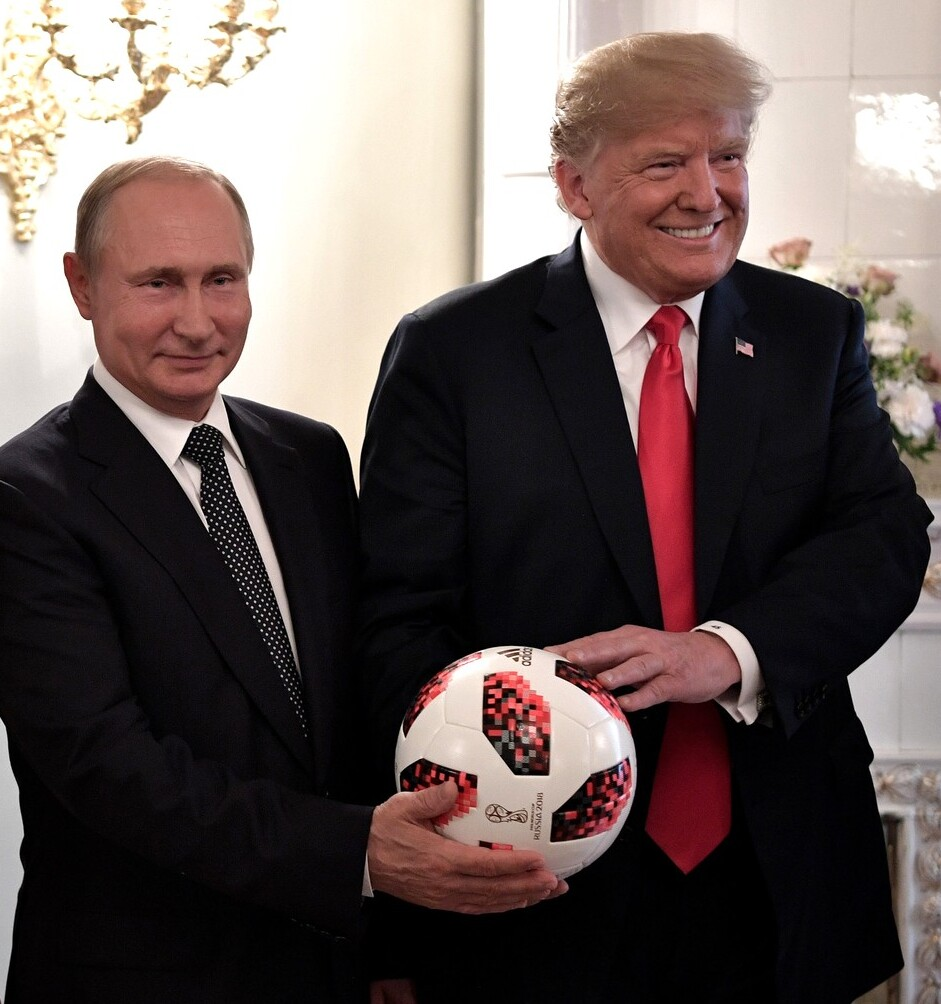
Vladimir Putin and Donald Trump holding a Telstar Mechta during the 2018 Russia–United States Summit. Trump said he would give Barron the ball.

According to The Washington Post in 2017, golf is "a favorite of Barron's", and his father played golf with him during his first presidency, but only rarely according to People magazine. Trump played baseball in Central Park in his youth. During the 2017 Easter Egg Roll at the White House, Trump discussed soccer with D.C. United forward Patrick Mullins and midfielders Julian Buescher and Marcelo Sarvas. D.C. United presented him with a personalized soccer ball. In September 2017, Trump joined D.C. United Academy's under-12 team as a midfielder. During the 2018 Russia–United States Summit, Trump's father said he would give him the Telstar Mechta that Russian president Vladimir Putin gave him, though according to Bloomberg News, U.S. law prevents Barron from receiving the soccer ball. In December 2018, Trump met D.C. United forward Wayne Rooney at the White House, reportedly having asked his father to invite Rooney.

Trump accompanied his father in attending the 2026 FIFA World Cup final in New Jersey.

== See also ==
- First family of the United States
- List of children of presidents of the United States
