= Jeronim =

Jeronim may refer to:

- Jeronim, South Slavic and Albanian masculine given name
  - Jeronim de Rada, Italo-Albanian writer
  - Jeronim Ljubibratić, Ragusan military officer
  - Jeronim Mileta, Croatian cleric
  - Jeronim Vidulić, Croatian poet
- Jeronim, Slovenia, a village near Vransko

== See also ==
- Hieronymus
- Jere (name)
- Jerko
- Jerolim (disambiguation)
- Jerome
