= Jarolím =

Jarolím (feminine: Jarolímová) is a Czech surname and an old masculine given name. It is derived from the given name Jeroným, which is a Czech-language variant of the given name Hieronymus. Notable people with the surname include:

- David Jarolím (born 1979), Czech football player and manager
- Karel Jarolím (born 1956), Czech football player and manager
- Lukáš Jarolím (born 1976), Czech footballer
- Marek Jarolím (born 1984), Czech football player and manager

== See also ==
- Erika Jensen-Jarolim (born 1960), Austrian physician and medical researcher
- Jerolim (disambiguation)
