= Jerolim =

Jerolim may refer to:

- Jerolim, Croatian masculine given name
  - Jerolim Kavanjin, Croatian poet
  - Jerolim Miše, Croatian painter, teacher, and art critic
  - Jerolim Zagurović (c. 1550—1580), Serbian-Venetian printer
- Jerolim (island), an uninhabited island near Hvar, Croatia

== See also ==
- Jeronim (disambiguation)
- Jarolím
- Jere (name)
