= Amalija Knavs =

Slovenian textile worker (1945–2024)

- Knavs in 2024
- Born: Amalija Ulčnik; July 9, 1945; Judendorf-Straßengel, Allied-occupied Austria
- Died: January 9, 2024 (aged 78); Miami, Florida, U.S.
- Citizenship: Slovenia; United States
- Spouse: Viktor Knavs (m. 1966)
- Children: 2, including Melania
- Relatives: Donald Trump (son-in-law) Barron Trump (grandson)

Amalija Knavs (née Ulčnik; July 9, 1945 – January 9, 2024) was a Slovenian textile worker and the mother of Melania Trump, the first lady of the United States.

== Early and personal life ==
Amalija Ulčnik was born on July 9, 1945, in Judendorf-Straßengel, Allied-occupied Austria. She was raised there and in Slovenia, which was at the time part of Socialist Federal Republic of Yugoslavia. Her mother, Amalija (née Gliha), was a seamstress and farmer and her father, Anton Ulčnik, was a cobbler and later a red-onion farmer.

In her youth, she worked on her family's onion farm. From 1964 to 1997, she worked at a state-owned children's clothing factory where she created and monitored textile patterns.

Ulčnik met her husband, Viktor Knavs, a member of the League of Communists of Slovenia in Sevnica in 1966. After marrying, they lived in Sevnica, Slovenia. The couple had two daughters: Ines (born 1968) and Melanija (born 1970).

== Later life and death ==
By August 2017, Amalija and her husband were living in New York City. It was later confirmed that Melania sponsored their green cards. In May 2018, Amalija was in attendance for the White House Rose Garden ceremony which saw Melania launch her Be Best public awareness campaign. In August 2018, Amalija and Viktor Knavs became U.S. citizens after taking an oath at a New York City courthouse. The New York Times described her as not adhering in public to the "stereotypes of an American grandmother".

On January 9, 2024, Knavs died at a hospital in Miami, Florida, at the age of 78. She had been "very ill" since late 2023, with sources confirming to People that Melania skipped a Mar-a-Lago New Year's Eve party to attend to her bedside.

== See also ==
- Family of Donald Trump
