= Melania and Me =

2020 book by Stephanie Winston Wolkoff

- Author: Stephanie Winston Wolkoff
- Subject: Melania Trump
- Genre: Memoir
- Published: September 1, 2020
- Publisher: Gallery Books
- Publication place: United States
- Media type: Print, e-book, audiobook
- Pages: 352
- ISBN: 978-1-9821-5124-9 (Hardcover)

Melania and Me is a book by the American business executive Stephanie Winston Wolkoff about her time spent working for and her friendship with Melania Trump, the then–First Lady of the United States. It was published on September 1, 2020, by Gallery Books.

Wolkoff's memoir details her friendship of 15 years with Trump that ended with her being fired after damaging publicity about the finances of the first inauguration of Donald Trump, which Wolkoff largely organized. The book contains extensive direct quotes from Melania Trump; when asked how that was possible, Wolkoff explained that after her relations with the first lady soured, she began recording conversations.

The Justice Department filed suit against Wolkoff in October 2020, asserting she had violated a nondisclosure agreement by revealing confidential information acquired while working for the then-First company Lady. This was dropped by the Justice Department in February 2021.

== See also ==
- Melania (memoir)
