= Melania Trump =

First Lady of the United States (2017–2021; since 2025)

- Trump in 2025

First Lady of the United States
- Current
- Assumed role January 20, 2025
- President: Donald Trump
- Preceded by: Jill Biden
- In role January 20, 2017 – January 20, 2021
- President: Donald Trump
- Preceded by: Michelle Obama
- Succeeded by: Jill Biden

Personal details
- Born: Melanija Knavs; April 26, 1970 (age 56) Novo Mesto, then part of SR Slovenia, Yugoslavia
- Citizenship: Yugoslavia (until 1991); Slovenia (since 1991); U.S. (since 2006)
- Party: Republican
- Height: 5 ft 11 in (1.80 m)
- Spouse: Donald Trump (m. 2005)
- Children: Barron Trump
- Parents: Viktor Knavs; Amalija Ulčnik
- Relatives: Trump family
- Occupation: Model; socialite; activist
- Trump's voice Trump on her family's departure from the White House; Recorded January 18, 2021

Melania Knauss Trump (Note: Pronounced /məˈlɑːniə/ mə-LAH-nee-ə) (born Melanija Knavs; (Note: Name prior to her marriage: Melania Knauss (German: [meˈlaːni̯a ˈknaʊs]), a Germanization of her Slovene birth name Melanija Knavs (Slovene: [mɛˈlaːnija ˈknaːws]).) April 26, 1970) is a Slovenian and American former model serving as the first lady of the United States since 2025, a role she previously held from 2017 to 2021 as the third wife of Donald Trump, the 45th and 47th president of the United States. She is the first naturalized citizen and the first non-native English speaker to become first lady; the second foreign-born first lady, after Louisa Adams; the second Roman Catholic first lady, after Jacqueline Kennedy; and the second to hold the position nonconsecutively, after Frances Cleveland.

Melanija Knavs was born in Yugoslavia, where she began working as a fashion model at the age of 16 while pursuing her education. She changed the spelling of her name to Melania Knauss and traveled to Paris and Milan to seek modeling work before meeting Paolo Zampolli, who hired her and sponsored her immigration to the United States in 1996. She worked as a model in Manhattan, where she began dating Donald Trump shortly after Zampolli introduced them in 1998, while Trump was married to Marla Maples. Trump worked to get Knauss more modeling jobs, and she supported him during his 2000 presidential campaign. They married in 2005, and the following year had a son, Barron Trump. Knauss started her own jewelry brand, Melania, in 2009.

After encouraging her husband to run for president in the 2016 presidential election, Melania Trump made only rare campaign appearances, instead helping Donald with strategy. She received major press coverage during the campaign when erotic photos from her modeling years were republished, and again when a speech she gave at the 2016 Republican National Convention was found to be plagiarized from a similar speech by Michelle Obama. In the month leading up to the election, she defended her husband following the release of the Access Hollywood tape that mired his campaign in scandal.

For the early months of her tenure as first lady, Trump stayed in Manhattan to allow Barron to finish school there and to renegotiate her prenuptial agreement. She performed minimal official activities after moving into the White House and held fewer events than previous first ladies. Trump faced several challenges in 2018, including allegations of extramarital affairs committed by her husband, surgery for kidney disease, and a tour of Africa that was overshadowed by scrutiny of her wardrobe and personal conduct. As first lady, Trump prioritized children's issues, launching the Be Best campaign to promote children's welfare and visiting many children's hospitals. She was also a close advisor to her husband, influencing his decisions to end the Trump administration's family separation policy and to ban fruit-flavored electronic cigarette cartridges. In the final months of her initial tenure as first lady, Trump endorsed her husband's false claims of election fraud in the 2020 presidential election. After leaving the White House in 2021, she largely stayed out of the public view before assuming the role of first lady again in 2025.

== Early life and education ==
Trump was born Melanija Knavs on April 26, 1970, in Novo Mesto, Lower Carniola, SR Slovenia, SFR Yugoslavia. Her father, Viktor Knavs, first worked as a chauffeur; eventually, he sold car parts for a state-owned vehicle manufacturer as he made connections with the League of Communists of Yugoslavia. Her mother, Amalija Knavs, worked as a patternmaker at the children's clothing manufacturer Jutranjka in Sevnica. In Sevnica, the family lived in the state-run housing complex Naselje Heroja Maroka. Melania has an older sister, Ines, and an older half-brother from her father's previous relationship, Denis Cigelnjak, whom she reportedly has never met.

The family was well-off relative to most who lived in communist societies. They frequently went on vacations to other parts of Europe, and their apartment was decorated with brightly colored walls.

As a child, Melania, like other children of workers at the factory, participated in fashion shows that featured children's clothing. Textiles were Sevnica's primary industry. Students were excused from school to participate in the shows. From a young age, Melania expressed an interest in fashion, and she began customizing and sewing her own clothes. She developed a skill for it by watching her mother work. Melania did well in school, where she was appointed school treasurer.

When Melania was a teenager, she moved to a two-story house in Sevnica with her family. Soon after Tito's death, she was inspired by Ronald Reagan's Morning in America, sensing that "morning" was spreading across the world, even into her own country. Of particular interest to Melania was the new exposure to global fashion. At the age of fifteen, she began attending the Secondary School for Design and Photography in Ljubljana, making the long commute from her hometown to the capital and back each day by train. After her first year, she and Ines moved to the capital together in an apartment paid for by their father. After graduating at age nineteen, Melania enrolled in the Faculty of Architecture and Civil and Geodetic Engineering at the University of Ljubljana to further study design, leaving after a few months without finishing her degree.

Trump has said she can speak English, Italian, French, and German in addition to her native Slovene, but in public she has fluently spoken only English and Slovene.

== Early modeling career ==
=== European career ===
Knavs was discovered by Slovenian fashion photographer Stane Jerko when she was sixteen, after modeling in a school-sponsored show. At the time, she had wanted to be a fashion designer rather than a model. She won a modeling contest with the Italian studio Cinecittà that entitled her to a movie role, but rejected the prize after a producer sexually propositioned her. As her modeling career progressed, Knavs took on the alternate spelling of her surname as "Knauss" and of her given name as "Melania". She traveled in Europe to find modeling work. Except for a few close relatives, she did not maintain contact with anyone she knew in Slovenia. In 1992, she was named runner-up in the Jana Magazine Look of the Year contest, which promised its top three contestants an international modeling contract. She signed with RVR Reclame in Milan, but left the organization a few months later.

Knauss spent the following years traveling in Europe for modeling jobs, including one in which she portrayed the first female president of the United States in 1993. Around age 23 or 24, she made Paris her primary residence, where she lived with her roommate Victoria Silvstedt. Knauss modeled for fashion houses in Paris and Milan, where in 1995 she met Metropolitan Models co-owner Paolo Zampolli, who was on a scouting trip in Europe. Zampolli, a friend of her future husband Donald Trump, became one of her few long-time acquaintances.

=== Relocating to New York ===
Zampolli urged Knauss to travel to the United States, where he said he would like to represent her. In 1996, Knauss moved to Manhattan. By this time, she was already 26 years old, much older than most aspiring models. Zampolli encouraged Knauss to live near and socialize with people in the fashion industry, and he arranged for her to share an apartment with photographer Matthew Atanian in Zeckendorf Towers in Union Square. Her rent was taken from her pay with Zampolli's agency. Once she resided in the United States, she made only rare and brief visits to her country of origin. She lived a healthy lifestyle, managing her diet carefully, and avoided the drinking and partying that often consumed the lives of the models around her. She did not lead an active social life and rarely went out. Knauss was featured in a nude photo shoot for a 1997 issue of Max, a French men's magazine, with another female model. The photos were shot by the photographer Alexandre Ale de Basseville, and the work was unpaid, instead promising Knauss exposure in a prominent magazine. The photos were largely forgotten until they were published by the New York Post in 2016.

For her first weeks in the United States, her travel visa did not allow her to work in the country. Despite this, she accepted ten modeling jobs that earned her approximately $20,000 (equivalent to $41,000 in 2025). She then received a string of H-1B visas that allowed her to work for limited periods of time. In 2000, she applied for an EB-1 visa, colloquially known as an "Einstein visa", which was approved in 2001. She received her first major job when she posed for a Camel cigarette ad shot by Ellen von Unwerth, which was displayed as a Times Square billboard and ran in Rolling Stone. The opportunity was facilitated by a law that restricted cigarette ads to only depict people above the age of 25, excluding most aspiring models. When her roommate Atanian left New York, Knauss moved to an apartment off of Park Avenue.

== Marriage and family ==
=== Meeting Donald Trump ===
Donald Trump and Melania Knauss in 1999

In September 1998, Zampolli introduced Knauss to the real estate mogul Donald Trump at a party. Donald had a date to the event, Celina Midelfart. When he asked Knauss for her phone number, she refused. Instead, she insisted that he give her his own number. He passed her test when he gave her multiple personal numbers instead of an office number. She later said that giving her own number would make her "just one of the women he calls". The exact details of when and where this took place are unclear, though the Kit Kat Club is often described as where they met.

After a week, Knauss called Trump and they went on a date. She intentionally responded with indifference to his advances, knowing this would pique his interest. Not only was Trump's personality similar to that of her father, but they were of similar ages and had similar physical appearances. When they began dating, Knauss had access to his book Trump: The Art of the Comeback, in which he detailed what he wanted from a relationship.

Knauss held a press conference on September 8, spending the event recounting her successes and telling reporters that she was "world famous", "among the top 50" highest-paid models in the world, and set to appear in a movie alongside Mickey Rourke. The intention was to build her profile in anticipation of another, ultimately unsuccessful, cigarette ad campaign. This was unusual behavior for a woman who typically kept a quiet and professional presence, and reporters were unable to verify the claims she made. The Trumps have stated that they met at the New York Fashion Week shortly after this conference but, according to biographer Mary Jordan, rumors in the industry suggested that their relationship had already developed by then. Their relationship initially only lasted a few weeks. Knauss left Trump after she saw his ex-girlfriend Kara Young leaving Trump Tower, but she reunited with him the following week.

=== Relationship with Donald Trump ===
Donald Trump's fame and connections provided Melania Knauss with new career opportunities. Shortly after the death of Jacqueline Kennedy, whom she and her mother had greatly admired, Knauss met members of the Kennedy family at a gala. Through her relationship with Trump, she also attended numerous high-profile events and became acquainted with prominent public figures and celebrities.

Knauss continued her modeling career after meeting Trump, though she took fewer jobs as time went on and she dedicated more time to him. In 1999, the couple gained attention after an interview with shock jock Howard Stern on his show, in which he asked them lewd sexual questions. Trump often brought Knauss to meetings to show her off, praising her beauty. He did not let her participate in the business, citing the conflict he had with his first wife after giving her an executive role.

Melania Knauss (on the right) with then-president Bill Clinton, Donald Trump, and Kylie Bax (listed right to left) in 2000

Trump announced his candidacy for the Reform Party presidential nomination on October 7, 1999. Knauss strongly supported the move. When asked by The New York Times what her role would be if Trump were to become president, Knauss replied: "I would be very traditional, like Betty Ford or Jackie Kennedy." Knauss saw extensive media attention, as tabloids considered the idea of a model as first lady.

Knauss was one of the first models recruited to Trump's modeling agency, Trump Model Management, after its creation in February 1999. The following months, she appeared in several magazines and advertisements organized by individuals close to Trump. While Trump was organizing his campaign, Knauss appeared in the February edition of Sports Illustrated Swimsuit Issue. The image featured her in a bikini alongside a large inflatable whale; the shoot was run by Antoine Verglas, an associate of Zampolli's. Shortly after the shoot, Verglas called Knauss back for another project where he had her pose nude in a Bond girl aesthetic. Knauss later said she stood 'proudly behind [her] nude modeling work' in a post on X (Twitter) in September 2024. Trump had lobbied for her inclusion in a GQ spread, and her relationship with him allowed the shoot access to his Boeing 727 aircraft. Images from the shoot were included in the January 2000 edition of GQ magazine. At the time, Trump's involvement was not made known. She then appeared in another sexualized photoshoot, where she was posted in a mock-up of the Oval Office.

In January 2000, it was reported that Knauss and Trump had broken up, with conflicting accounts of who ended the relationship. Many photos and publicity pieces the two had done together were quickly edited before publication to accommodate the change. They kept in contact, and they reunited a few months later. Knauss received her green card in 2001, granting her permanent residency in the United States. Knauss and Trump moved in together at Trump Tower in 2002. She made her first appearance on Trump's game show The Apprentice in April 2004 when an episode had the contestants visit their penthouse.

=== Engagement and wedding ===
Trump proposed to Knauss on April 26, 2004, on her 34th birthday as they were leaving to attend the Met Gala. He reasoned that he was more willing to wed as she had not insisted on marriage, and he felt she had been an influence in his success over the previous years. She also signed his prenuptial agreement without issue. A few months before the wedding, Knauss traveled to Paris with Anna Wintour and André Leon Talley to find a wedding dress, deciding on a dress by John Galliano. In the days leading up to the wedding, she appeared on the front cover of Vogue in her dress.

Trump and Knauss married on January 22, 2005, at the Bethesda-by-the-Sea church in Palm Beach, Florida. The ceremony was followed by a reception in the ballroom at Trump's Mar-a-Lago estate, which Knauss planned with Preston Bailey. Numerous celebrities were present, including musicians, athletes, media executives, and television personalities. She had one bridesmaid, her sister Ines, who had moved to New York so they could be closer together. Knauss arranged all of the details of the wedding with her planner. She let Trump make decisions about the event, but she refused his suggestion that the wedding be broadcast on NBC.

=== Marriage and motherhood ===
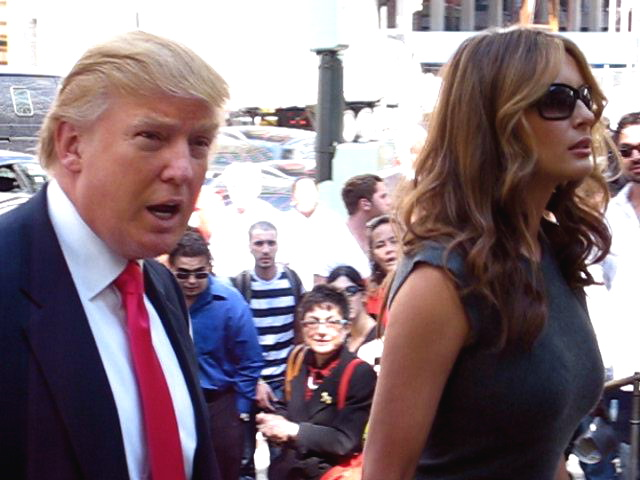
Donald Trump and Melania Trump in 2006

The Trumps had three residences that they traveled between: Trump Tower in New York, Trump National Golf Club Bedminster in New Jersey, and Mar-a-Lago in Florida. To have her own private accommodation, Melania had a private spa constructed on the top floor of Trump Tower. As a couple, the two did not spend much direct time together, preferring to live adjacently. According to Donald, their passive relationship suited him because he worked for a living and did not "want to go home and work at a relationship". Melania accepted a transactional element in their relationship, though she cared about Donald and did not believe that she was a gold digger. When she attended events with her husband at Trump facilities, she often stayed for only a few minutes to make an appearance before returning to the private residence. Donald did not learn to speak Melania's native language, which she said she accepted because she is "not a nagging wife".

Upon marrying Donald, Melania became stepmother to his four children: Donald Trump Jr., Eric Trump and Ivanka Trump from his first marriage to Ivana Zelníčková, and Tiffany Trump from his second marriage to Marla Maples. Melania had especially bonded with Tiffany, who was six when Melania began dating her father, and made sure she felt included among her half-siblings. Melania's pregnancy was widely covered in the media. She again appeared on the cover of Vogue, showing her pregnant body in a bikini and an open coat. Melania's sister and their parents frequently visited her throughout the pregnancy. She oversaw the construction of a nursery in Trump Tower and had a baby shower at the FAO Schwarz toy store, insisting that the toys and gifts she received be donated to a children's hospital.

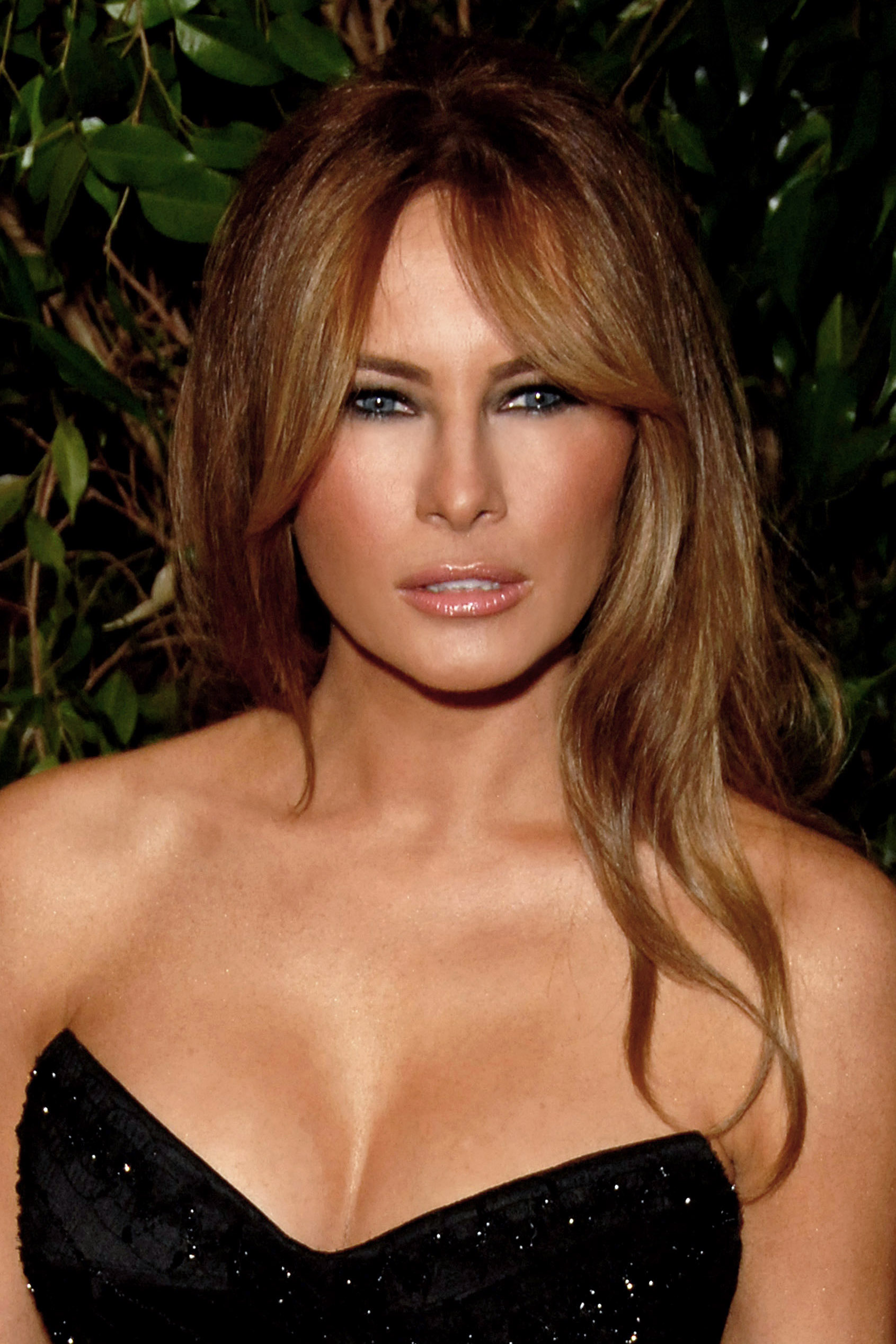
Melania Trump in 2011

On March 20, 2006, Melania and Donald had a son, Barron William Trump. Melania chose her son's middle name, while Donald chose his first name. Donald had previously used the name Barron as a pseudonym when he posed as his own public relations agent. After Barron was born, Melania was active in his life and accordingly spent less time attending events with her husband. Donald had made it clear to her that if they had a child, he would not be actively involved in the child's life. Melania later said she approved of this, stating that she "didn't want him changing diapers or putting Barron to bed". She avoided the use of nannies, with a few exceptions in Barron's earliest years, insisting on raising him herself. Due to this decreased social activity Donald began courting supermodels again, which made Melania uncomfortable. According to biographer Mary Jordan, Melania did not know about the women who later alleged that they had extramarital affairs with him.

Melania stayed out of the public spotlight after she settled into her life as a Trump, excepting occasional charity work and an appearance in an Aflac commercial. She became a citizen of the United States on July 28, 2006. She then sponsored her parents using the "chain migration" immigration process that her husband later repeatedly criticized. Melania and Barron maintain dual citizenship, of the United States and Slovenia. Spending most of her time at Trump residences, she rarely kept companions besides her parents and her son.

As her son reached childhood, Melania found herself with more time for other pursuits. She trademarked her name, Melania, in 2009 as a jewelry brand, which she used to sell less expensive jewelry pieces on QVC. She was intentional about not using the Trump name in her branding, correcting reporters who called it Melania Trump. She drew the designs herself, based on three places where she had lived: New York, Palm Beach, and Paris. Over the following years she released additional Melania collections, which all sold out. Melania then developed a line of caviar-infused skincare products under the brand Melania Marks Skincare in 2011. The brand never launched, and Melania sued the company selling the products, New Sunshine, for US$50 million in lost revenue after it underwent management changes and voided the contract. The company alleged that one executive had given a sweetheart deal to the Trumps because Donald was a family friend. The case was decided in Melania's favor, and the amount to be paid to her was settled out of court.

== Donald Trump 2016 presidential campaign ==
=== Personal life during the campaign ===
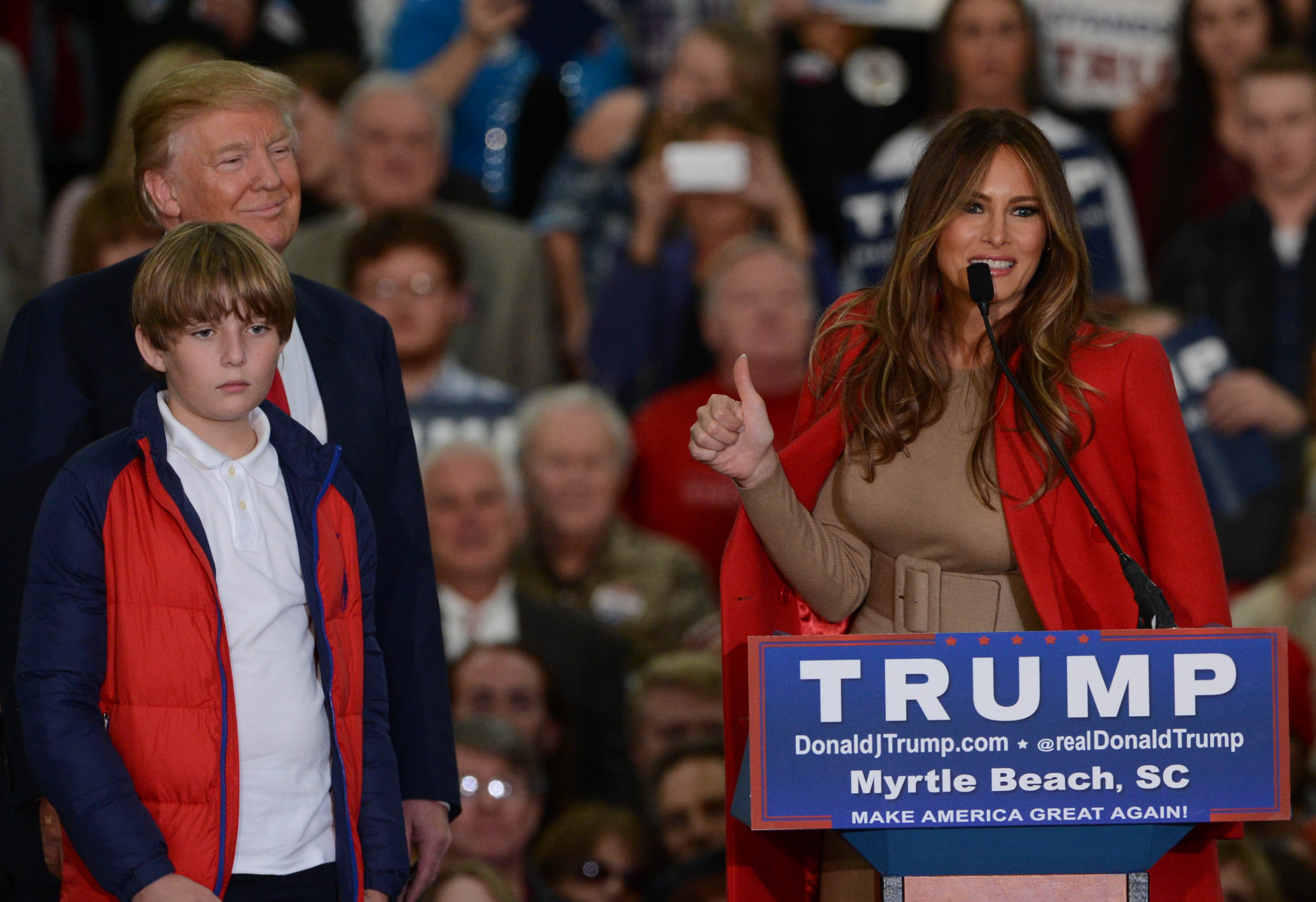
Melania Trump at a campaign event with Donald and Barron in November 2015

Melania was the one who finally convinced Donald to campaign for president in the 2016 presidential election, telling him that he either needed to do it or stop talking about it. When the campaign began, Melania made it clear to her husband that she would not be pressured into campaigning or attending events, and that she would only make appearances when she wanted to. She subsequently played a relatively small role in the campaign, which had been atypical of spouses of presidential candidates since the early 20th century. Explaining her absence, she cited the need to stay home with her son Barron. Her daily routine was nonetheless altered by the campaign, as she had to take security arrangements into account when she traveled, and she could not post about her activities online in real time. Once a prolific user of Instagram and Twitter, she became less active on her social media accounts when the campaign began.

While many people doubted Donald's chances at the presidency, including his own inner circle, Melania believed he would win. Unlike Donald's advisors, Melania encouraged him to follow his instincts and say what he felt he should say, with the exception that she does not like his use of profane language. She analyzed the campaign closely from home, following polling and watching how her husband interacted with his opponents. She spoke to him on the phone regularly throughout the campaign, including a conversation after each rally in which she gave a candid evaluation of how he did.

=== Campaign involvement ===
Melania's career as a model was an advantage during the campaign, as she was prepared for photographers and did not need to hire a fashion consultant. As a model, she was required to be deliberate in all of her movement, including how she stood and walked. She resented being called shy during the campaign, saying that this was an impression spread by people who only briefly met her and wanted their "15 minutes of fame". Melania's earliest speaking appearances in November 2015 and February 2016 were prompted by Donald calling on her to speak to the crowd. Both times, she only said a few sentences. Her first scheduled speech during the campaign did not take place until April 2016.

The campaign reportedly wanted to get Melania more active, as she was in a unique position to humanize Donald and to appeal to the American Dream from an immigrant's perspective. Hope Hicks was the campaign's main liaison with Melania, facilitating any appearances that she wished to make. Melania trusted Hicks's judgement and allowed her to weigh the importance of a given appearance. Her rare appearances brought her to swing states where her husband needed extra support, and her speeches celebrated his personal traits instead of policy.

Melania was involved in the vice presidential selection process, meeting with the top contenders, and her approval of Mike Pence contributed to his selection. The deciding factor, in her mind, was that Pence was not as ambitious as the other contenders and would not seek to undermine Donald.

=== Media coverage ===
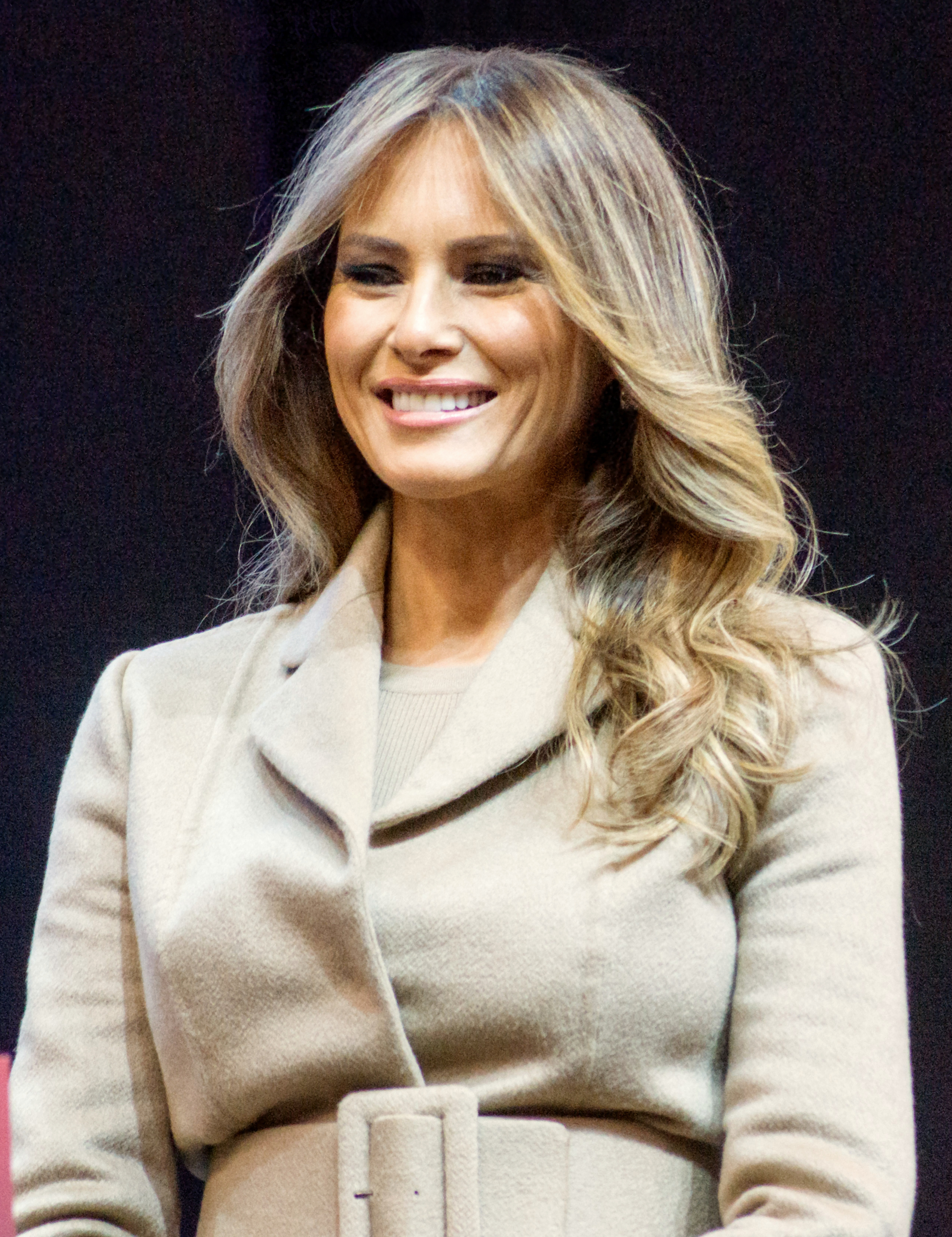
Melania Trump in 2016

An attack ad against the Trumps was produced by a super PAC that supported Donald's opponent Ted Cruz featuring Melania's nude GQ photo with the caption "Meet Melania Trump. Your next first lady. Or you could support Ted Cruz on Tuesday", intensifying the rivalry between the two candidates in the 2016 Republican Party presidential primaries. More nude images of Melania were published on the front page of the New York Post in July 2016 in a story titled "The Ogle Office". The images did not have a major effect on the campaign, as Melania was seen as the victim, but they were humiliating and she spent the following two months away from the public.

On July 18, 2016, Melania gave a speech at the 2016 Republican National Convention. A controversy emerged after it became apparent that a paragraph of the speech had been plagiarized from Michelle Obama's speech at the 2008 Democratic National Convention. When asked about it, Melania said she wrote the speech herself "with as little help as possible". Despite political campaigns typically having several people to scrutinize such speeches, no one in the Trump campaign had reviewed the speech. Donald was furious with his staff and felt he had failed Melania, while Melania felt she herself had failed the campaign through the scandal. It was the only major speech she delivered during the campaign. Two days later, Trump staff writer Meredith McIver took responsibility, saying there was a misunderstanding when Melania read passages of Obama's speech as examples. The speech also included a rare statement on her past, describing her family in Slovenia and her early modeling career. After giving the speech, Melania stayed out of public view until Election Day approached.

=== Access Hollywood tape ===
On October 7, a month before the election, the Access Hollywood tape was leaked. The tape had been recorded in 2005, shortly after their marriage, and it featured audio of Donald making lewd remarks about his treatment of women. Immediately after its release, the campaign's primary concern was Melania's reaction. It took Donald two hours before he went to see Melania. Upon their meeting, Melania reportedly told him "Now you could lose, you could have blown this for us", and then left the room after he apologized. In 2024, her husband's former personal counsel Michael Cohen testified during The People of the State of New York v. Donald J. Trump trial that Donald had privately credited her as having suggested that the campaign's response strategy should best characterize the conversation on the tape as "locker room talk".

Melania kept her distance from him, angry that he may have ended his candidacy with his comments, and she waited a day before making a comment. When asked by the campaign to make a scripted appearance alongside Donald as damage control, she refused, deciding that she was going to respond her own way. She also refused to sit beside him during his recorded apology as politicians' spouses often did in these situations. Melania released a statement saying that the tape did not show "the man I know" and said those who accused him of sexual misconduct are liars. Melania received significantly more attention from the press following the incident, and she was frustrated by the pity she received. A few days later, she attended a presidential debate wearing a pussy bow, causing widespread speculation about her intention (as her husband's comments on the Access Hollywood tape had included, "Grab them by the pussy" (or vulva).

== First tenure as first lady of the United States (2017–2021) ==
Melania was the first naturalized citizen to become first lady and the second foreign-born woman to hold the title, after Louisa Adams, who was born in England. She was also the second Roman Catholic first lady of the United States, after Jacqueline Kennedy.

=== First lady in Manhattan ===
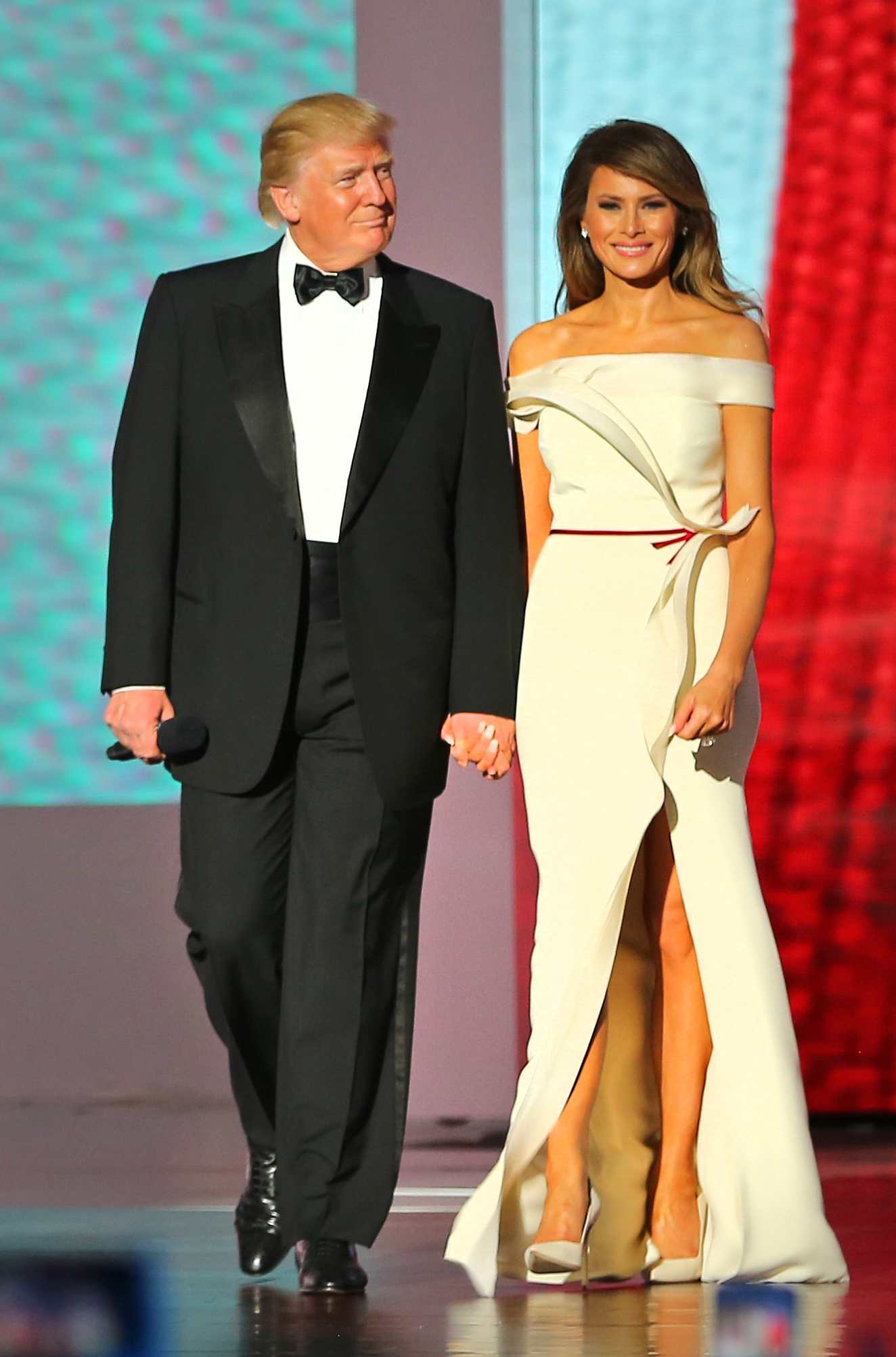
Melania Trump with Donald Trump at the Liberty Ball, January 20, 2017

After Donald's inauguration as president on January 20, 2017, Melania announced that she would not move to Washington, D.C., with him, instead staying in Manhattan so Barron could finish the school year there. Remaining in New York also allowed her to introduce her son to the White House gradually so as not to overwhelm him. According to biographer Mary Jordan, a Pulitzer Prize-winning Washington Post journalist, "Melania also used this time to negotiate new terms for her prenuptial agreement with Donald to reflect the changes in their lives since it was signed and to ensure that Barron would receive a suitable inheritance." Mrs. Trump's spokesperson dismissed Jordan's book as "belonging in the fiction genre".

Melania's absence from the White House caused speculation that her stepdaughter Ivanka would serve as an acting first lady. As time went by, members of the administration's staff like her assistant, Stephanie Winston Wolkoff, grew unhappy with Melania's absence, as it gave the impression of marital issues and prevented her from exercising a calming influence over the president. She also stoked resentment among many of the people in New York, who predominantly opposed the Trumps, because of the costs and traffic issues caused by the Secret Service presence. The Secret Service itself also faced logistical issues from the repeated travel to New York. Having a Secret Service detail was not a major adjustment for Melania though, as she had spent years around her husband's security team. She was given the Secret Service code name "Muse" to go along with the president's name "Mogul". Being first lady came with another drawback for Melania, as she was expected to speak on serious topics such as immigration policy and had little control over how her media appearances were handled, which was a different experience than she had as a model.

When the Trump administration's White House website was posted, Melania's biographical information caused controversy because it listed her jewelry business. Though it had already ceased operation, critics alleged that it was an attempt to promote her business with government resources. Another allegation of attempting to profit from her role as first lady came up in February, when she sued the Daily Mail for libel after it alleged in 2016 that she had worked for an escort agency. The suit was initially for lost career opportunities, but this was changed to emotional distress when she received questions about why she expected to have career opportunities as first lady.

On March 8, 2017, Melania hosted her first White House event, a luncheon for International Women's Day. She spoke to an audience of women about her life as a female immigrant and about working towards gender equality both domestically and abroad, noting the role of education as a tool against gender inequality. The Trumps visited Vatican City in May 2017. As Melania was visiting as a Roman Catholic, Pope Francis blessed her rosary beads, and she placed flowers at the feet of a statue of the Virgin Mary at the Vatican's Bambino Gesù children's hospital.

The first major public attention Melania received was after an incident in May 2017 while the Trumps were visiting Israel. Donald had forgotten that Melania was by his side when he was walking with Prime Minister Benjamin Netanyahu, and she fell behind from the group. Humiliated, she slapped away his hand when he reached out behind him to grab hers. This was the first time press coverage of Melania took notice of an independent streak.

=== East Wing staff ===
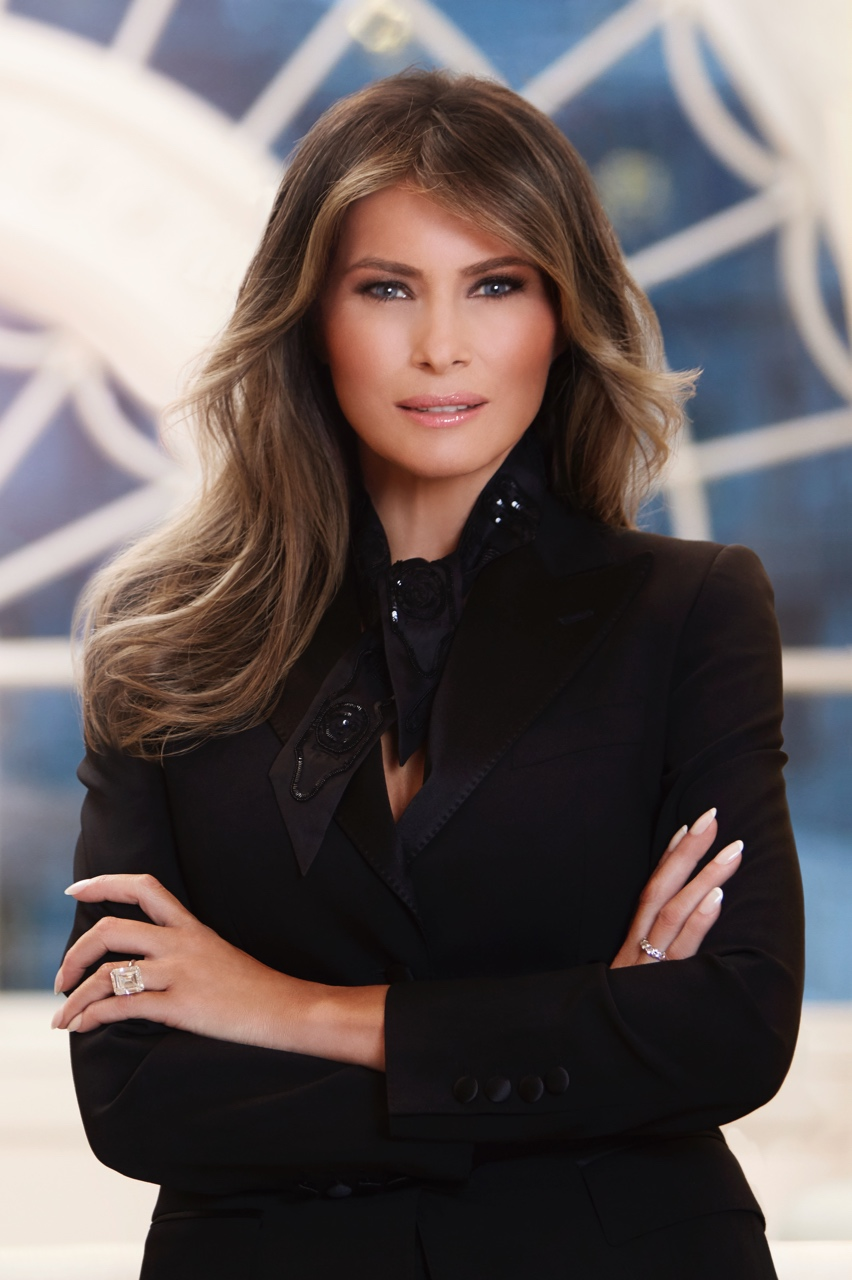
Official White House portrait, 2017

The lack of staff appointments in the East Wing during the first months of the Trump administration—typically the domain of the first lady—caused a backlog of tour requests to develop. In February several hires were made for the Office of the First Lady: Anna Cristina Niceta Lloyd as social secretary, Lindsay Reynolds as the first lady's chief of staff, Tham Kannalikham as her decorator, Stephanie Winston Wolkoff as the first lady's assistant, and Stephanie Grisham as communications director. Melania retained the head florist appointed by Michelle Obama, Hedieh Ghaffarian. The chief usher appointed under the Obama administration, Angella Reid, was replaced by Trump International Hotel employee Timothy Harleth, breaking the norm of the chief usher serving under multiple presidencies. Reid had been broadly unpopular with the staff, and the firing earned Melania their goodwill.

The first lady's staff remained small relative to those of her predecessors. This was in part because she did not want to have any employees speaking on her behalf. Instead, she answered her correspondences herself. Melania had a reputation in the White House for being "drama-free", and for treating the staff well. According to her husband's campaign manager Corey Lewandowski, her staff had "100 percent loyalty to her". Melania had a close, trusting relationship with her staff, and she was protective of them when conflict arose. Before moving in, Melania worked with Kannalikham to redecorate the White House, as first ladies typically do. She had most of the Obama-era decor replaced, and like the Obamas, the Trumps paid for it out of pocket instead of using the allotted funding.

=== Life in the White House ===
Melania and her son, Barron, moved into the White House on June 11, 2017. Like they had throughout their marriage, Melania and Donald chose to sleep in separate bedrooms. In her first year, Melania gave only eight speeches, compared to 74 by Michelle Obama and 42 by Laura Bush. Instead of frequent public appearances, she communicated her activities through video. Most of Melania's appearances as first lady in 2017 were in Manhattan and Washington, and she typically spoke about women's and children's issues.

After moving to the White House, Melania opted to spend most of her time in the private quarters, running the White House staff from there instead of the first lady's East Wing offices. Leaning on her design expertise, she played a significant role, shaping architecture, landscape, preserving historic interiors, and enhancing decorative arts to carry the White House forward. Her accomplishments include the complete renovation of the Queens' Bedroom and Bathroom, the conservation of the historic Zuber wall covering in the President's Dining Room, preservation work of the East Room floor, State Entrance and Hall marble floors, President's Elevator, and White House Bowling Alley demonstrating a broader devotion to American craftsmanship and the preservation of the People's House. On the grounds, she oversaw the award-winning design and construction of the White House Tennis Pavilion, Children's Garden and restoration of the Rose Garden renewing its historic design while revamping infrastructure and accessibility. Notably, her design work extended beyond the White House grounds to Camp David preserving and evolving America's historic presidential spaces. She kept one office, called the "swag room" by aides, in which she kept trinkets she collected while she was first lady. To accommodate Barron's soccer practice, she had a net installed on the White House grounds and had a coach practice with him. Barron remained Melania's top priority when she was first lady, and she worked to keep him free from politics to the point that staffers referred to her as "The Protector". Even after arriving at the White House, Melania spent extensive time away each year, visiting Mar-a-Lago on major holidays and over many weekends.

Melania personally involved herself in decorations and planning within the White House. She was particular about how things were designed and arranged whenever events were planned, but she would take on a calm and relaxed demeanor once the event began. Whenever a foreign dignitary arrived at the White House, Melania had the Blue Room set aside where she ate lunch or drank tea with the dignitary's spouse. When choosing which presidential china set to use, Melania often chose the Clinton administration china with its gold embroidery. She held events less frequently than her predecessors, with a typical week featuring three or fewer events, all under one hour long. Among her most ambitious projects was planning the White House Christmas decorations in 2018. Moving away from traditional designs, she filled the East Colonnade with red cranberry-laden trees set atop a green carpet. The design was widely derided, which Melania ascribed to personal taste. To protect use of her image and maintain an income, Melania licensed photos from her photoshoots through Getty Images. This allowed her to choose how they were used by reporters, and she received royalties for each use. The Office of Government Ethics reported that she made $100,000 to $1,000,000 in royalties in 2017, though other estimates put it at over $10,000,000.

As one of her official duties, Melania was the honorary chair of the John F. Kennedy Center for the Performing Arts. Because of political tension with the arts communities, she was not initially active in the role. She made her first appearances at the Kennedy Center in 2019. Trump unveiled the abstract sculpture Floor Frame by Isamu Noguchi in the White House Rose Garden in November 2020. She described it as "embodying themes of resilience and renewal" in her eponymous memoir.

=== Tribulations in early 2018 ===
A scandal broke in January 2018 when it was alleged that Donald had had an extramarital affair with the pornographic actress Stormy Daniels. The affair was said to have taken place in July 2006, after the Trumps' marriage and the birth of their son. Melania's public appearances became more infrequent after the news emerged, and she canceled several events that she was to attend with her husband. This included the 2018 State of the Union Address, where Melania made the unprecedented decision to ride separately from him on the way there. Michael Cohen, who had arranged the silencing of the alleged affair, stated that his greatest regret was lying to Melania, saying that she did not deserve it. The next month, the story of a second affair in 2006 with the model Karen McDougal was made public. To Melania, the worst part was that she felt Donald had publicly humiliated her.

Melania learned in April 2018 that she was afflicted with kidney disease, but she only told her parents, her husband, and her sister. On May 14, she began treatment at Walter Reed National Military Medical Center. While her husband had wished to join her, his presence would have risked the press discovering her condition. The official statement said she underwent an embolization, a minimally invasive procedure that deliberately blocks a blood vessel. A statement was released after the procedure was finished without complication, and she recovered in the hospital over the following five days. The extended stay led to false rumors and conspiracy theories that she had gotten plastic surgery. After leaving the hospital, she continued to stay out of the public eye until the beginning of June. At this point, the president let slip that the surgery had been more serious than initially suggested.

Those around Melania noticed that she was generally happier by mid-2018. By this time, she had reached a more advantageous marital agreement that ensured Barron would be given a fair inheritance. Her public position, and the corresponding influence she had over her husband's political career, had given her the advantage in negotiations. After several months of problems, Melania received positive coverage for a large custom-made white hat that she wore during a visit by French president Emmanuel Macron. On August 9, 2018, Melania's parents were granted American citizenship. This revitalized accusations of hypocrisy by the Trumps regarding Melania's parents, as Donald had spoken out against the chain migration process that allowed them to enter the United States.

=== 2018 Africa tour ===
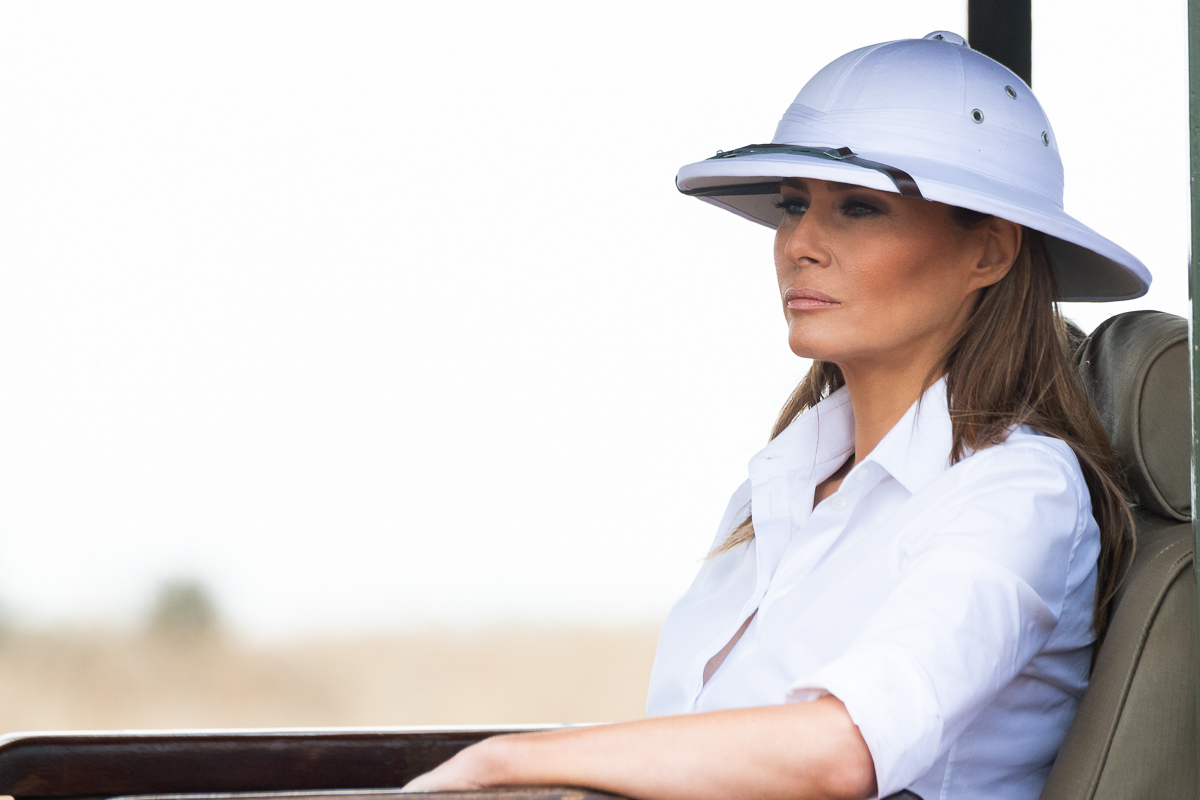
Melania Trump wearing a pith helmet in Kenya during her tour in Africa

In October 2018, Melania took a tour of Africa without Donald, visiting Ghana, Malawi, Kenya and Egypt. She spent much of her time with children in schools, orphanages, and hospitals. She used the trip to tout relief work being carried out by the United States Agency for International Development, which raised questions about her husband's intention to cut its funding. Melania also received criticism for her fashion choices, where a photo opportunity in front of the Great Sphinx of Giza was seen as exploitive and a pith helmet she wore in Kenya was criticized for its association with colonialism in Africa. To these criticisms, she responded that people should pay more attention to her actions instead of her outfits. Perception of the trip grew worse when she responded to criticisms by saying that she was "the most bullied person in the world".

Throughout Melania's tour of Africa, personality conflicts took place between her team and Mira Ricardel, the deputy national security advisor. Ricardel's staffer had been bumped from the first lady's plane on the flight to Africa to make room for a journalist, and Ricardel subsequently became less cooperative with providing logistical information needed for the tour. Upon returning, Ricardel gave a thoroughly negative report on Melania's staff, describing them as embarrassing the White House with their partying. Melania twice complained to the president, but no immediate action was taken. The following month, the Office of the First Lady issued an official statement calling for Ricardel to be removed from her position. Publicly commenting on such a thing was unprecedented for a first lady. No one in the administration had been told in advance about the statement, including the president. Ricardel was fired the following day. A dispute over the trip arose between Melania and Ivanka a few months later when the latter made her own trip to the continent. Melania felt that in taking such a similar trip, Ivanka was intruding on the first lady's role.

=== Political influence ===
Trump was the one person exempt from the criticism and distrust that her husband leveled against those around him in the White House. He held her opinion in high regard, often agreeing with her when she made it known, and he valued her loyalty as she did not seek public attention of her own. She said she believed that it was not her duty as first lady to take policy positions in her own right, but simply to advise Donald regarding his. She was the only person among those around him who could critique him directly without repercussion. Donald frequently asked for her opinion about issues he was considering or people who he interacted with, calling her over the phone when she was not in the same room.

Trump paid close attention to media coverage throughout her husband's presidency, providing her input on what would make good optics and maintain his image. She also provided advice on how to pose for pictures and has given him suggestions on how to appear when moving. The nature of their relationship allowed her to overlook erratic behavior from her husband, as she had long believed that there was no use in trying to change someone's personality, especially her husband's.

Trump had influence over her husband's staff, and Donald sometimes fired individuals on her advice. The welfare of children is a subject of interest for her, and she routinely made visits to children's hospitals throughout her tenure as first lady. According to her biographer Kate Bennett, interacting with children is one of the rare things that causes Trump to shift away from her usual stoic demeanor. Her advocacy was a major factor in her husband's decision to ban fruit-flavored electronic cigarette cartridges. About one year into her tenure, she hired Reagan Thompson as a policy advisor, though she had yet to adopt any official initiatives at the time.

==== Family separation policy ====
Trump was openly critical of her husband's "zero tolerance" policy of denying asylum at the Mexico–United States border in 2018, where children were being separated from their parents. Her official position was that she hated to see families separated and hoped for successful immigration reform. Out of public view, she made her opposition clear to the president and influenced his decision to end it. Leaked tapes in 2020 featured Trump making statements defending some of the practices, expressing grief about family separation but questioning the validity of asylum claims and dismissing concerns that children were kept in substandard conditions.

Trump was upset when her stepdaughter Ivanka began receiving the credit for changing the president's mind on the issue. She visited the border herself, ignoring her husband's worries about keeping media attention on the border and the Secret Service's need of advance notice to plan her trip. She arrived at the border on June 21, where she visited the family separation facilities in Texas and attended a roundtable with doctors, medical staff, social workers, and other experts at Upbring New Hope Children's Shelter. On the way to the border facility, she caused controversy by wearing a jacket that read, "I really don't care, do u?" After much speculation about the jacket's message, including criticism that she may have been expressing indifference toward the families separated at the border, she stated that the jacket was aimed at people and media who were criticizing her. The jacket dominated media coverage of her visit.

=== Be Best campaign ===
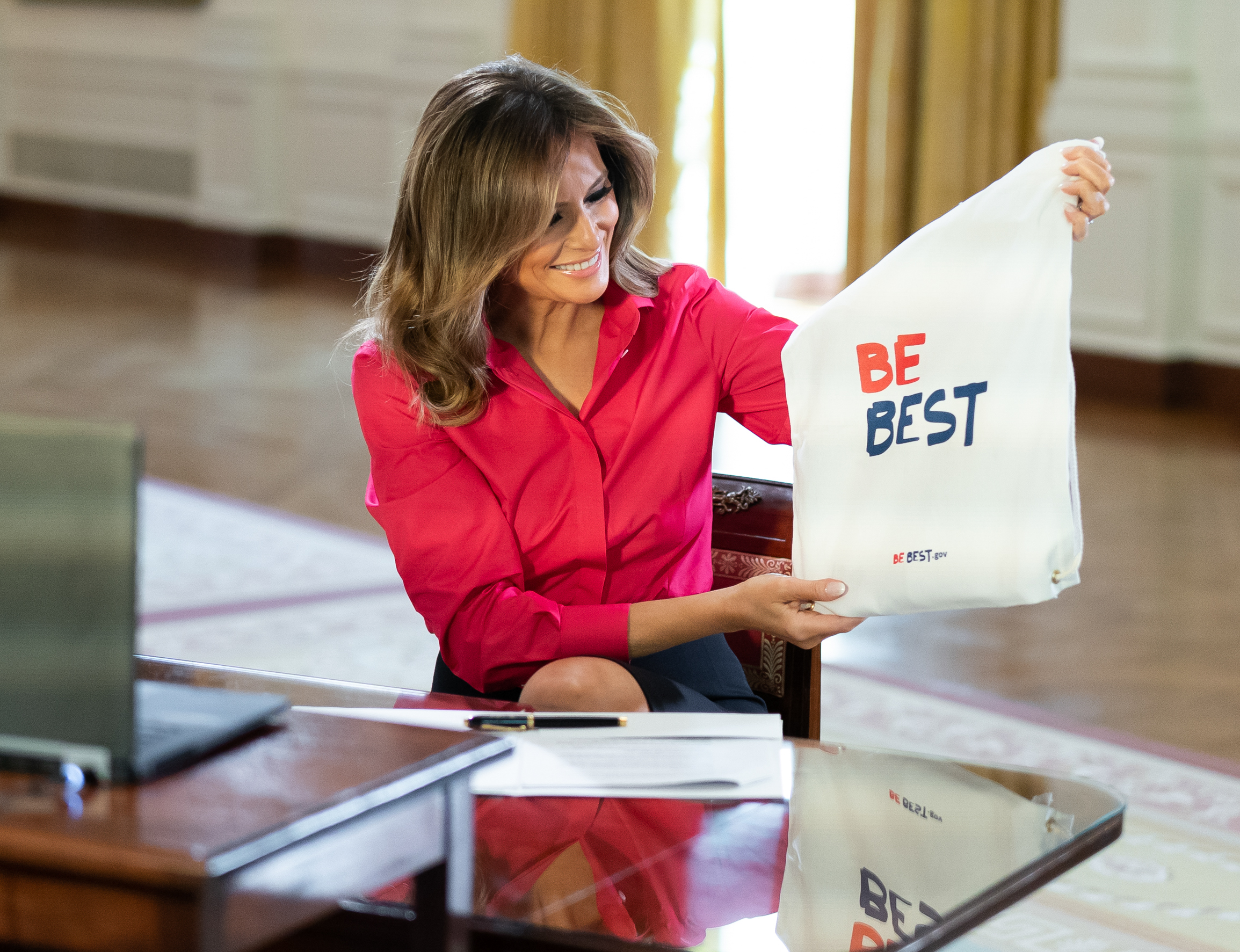
Melania Trump celebrating the second anniversary of the Be Best campaign

On May 7, 2018, Melania held a press conference in the White House Rose Garden to announce her official public initiative as first lady, the Be Best awareness campaign. The initiative was created to support the welfare of children, advocate against cyberbullying, and prevent opioid abuse. The initiative's name drew ridicule in the press for its grammatical structure. Instead of creating new programs like previous first ladies' projects, Be Best promoted existing initiatives and organizations that worked toward the cause. Public awareness of the initiative remained low, and it was often regarded solely as an anti-cyberbullying campaign.

The Be Best campaign drew criticism for its perceived hypocrisy, challenging cyberbullying when her husband was well known for attacking people online. Even Donald had warned her before the campaign's launch that the contrast may provoke criticism. She acknowledged the discrepancy but insisted that she would continue because she felt it was a good cause. This received more attention in 2019 when the president made Twitter posts critical of Greta Thunberg, a teenage environmental activist diagnosed on the autism spectrum. This came days after Melania had criticized Pamela Karlan for invoking Barron in a speech against the president. The first lady's office responded that spouses can have different communication styles and that Barron was not "an activist who travels the globe giving speeches".

=== COVID-19 and 2020 presidential campaign ===
Melania carried out a major reorganization of her staff in April 2020 in anticipation of her husband's reelection campaign. She appointed Marcia Lee Kelly as her senior advisor and Emma Doyle as her policy advisor. Melania's chief of staff, Lindsay Reynolds, was removed; her responsibilities went to Melania's communications director, Stephanie Grisham. Melania became an active campaigner for her husband during the 2020 presidential election, which was a strong contrast to her 2016 activity. She also played a role in planning the logistics of the 2020 Republican National Convention.

When the COVID-19 pandemic began, Melania was criticized for promoting a White House renovation project. She took the topic more seriously after the COVID-19 lockdowns began, using her Twitter account to encourage social distancing during the pandemic and promote official medical advice. Much of what she posted directly contradicted what her husband posted, as he discouraged many of the recommended practices.

On October 1, 2020, Melania's former advisor Stephanie Winston Wolkoff released audiotapes that featured Melania making profane statements about her image and role as first lady. In the tapes, she condemned the media for not giving her positive coverage, questioned why people wanted her to speak out against her husband when she supported his policies, and expressed frustration with her responsibility to oversee Christmas decorations in the White House. She also mentioned her "I really don't care, do u" jacket in the tapes, admitting that she wore it to irritate liberals. Winston Wolkoff had released the tapes alongside a tell-all book, Melania and Me. The Justice Department filed a civil suit against Winston Wolkoff in October 2019, alleging breach of a nondisclosure agreement, but it was dropped in February 2021 under the Biden administration. In September 2022, Melania said in an interview with Breitbart News that the audiotapes had been strategically edited to make people believe that her duties in the White House had been unimportant to her.

Despite Donald's loss of the 2020 election, Melania ended her tenure by endorsing his false statement that he had been the legitimate election winner. For her final months in the White House, she stopped visiting her office in the East Wing and remained in the White House residence. Her focus at this time was on compiling photo albums of the decorations and renovations she had overseen through her tenure. Melania was managing photography at the White House when the January 6 United States Capitol attack took place and gave no comment at the time. She later said she would have commented if she had been "fully informed of all the details". Her communications director, Stephanie Grisham, later stated she had sent Melania a text message asking her to make a statement condemning the violence and resigned when that did not happen. On January 18, Melania released a farewell video asking the American people to uphold the principles of her Be Best campaign. She followed the tradition of leaving a letter for incoming first lady Jill Biden, but she did not contact her to make transition arrangements or provide her the traditional tour of the White House.

== Between first lady tenures (2021–2025) ==
The Melania meme coin experienced extreme volatility in its first days, after which it declined in price.

After the Trumps left the White House, Melania returned to Mar-a-Lago, where she could live while avoiding public attention. She retained one White House advisor, Marcia Lee Kelly, to help her during the post-presidency. Melania kept in contact with her successor, Jill Biden, and the two have exchanged birthday cards. Since her first tenure as first lady ended, Melania has made occasional paid speaking appearances, she founded a scholarship program for foster children, and she minted a line of Apollo 11–themed non-fungible tokens that were not in compliance with NASA's image use policy. In November 2023, Melania attended the memorial service for former first lady Rosalynn Carter.

Melania remained out of public view during her husband's court appearances and his candidacy in the 2024 presidential election, limiting her campaign events to two fundraisers for the Log Cabin Republicans. She became more visible in July 2024 by putting out a statement following the attempted assassination of her husband and appearing at the 2024 Republican National Convention, though she declined an invitation to speak at the event, making her the first candidate's spouse not to speak at the convention since Barbara Bush began the tradition. In the same month, Melania announced her intention to publish a memoir, titled Melania. She caused controversy among Republicans in the lead up to the book's publication when she announced her support for the right to abortion. Donald won the election on November 5, 2024.

In January 2025, Amazon MGM Studios announced that it had licensed a documentary film on Melania directed by Brett Ratner for distribution in theatres and on Amazon Prime Video. She was also an executive producer. Filming started in December 2024. Amazon reportedly paid US$40 million to license the documentary. The documentary, titled Melania, covered the 20 days leading up to the 2025 presidential inauguration and was scheduled for release in US theaters and other territories on January 30, 2026. Less than two weeks before assuming the role of first lady again, Melania attended the funeral for former President Jimmy Carter.

On the eve of Donald's inauguration as U.S. president, Melania launched her own cryptocurrency, the $Melania coin, following the debut of the $Trump coin. In May 2025, it was reported by the Financial Times that two dozen wallets purchased $2.6 million worth of the tokens minutes before Melania announced the launch on her Truth Social account and then sold them off in the upcoming days for $100 million.

== Second tenure as first lady (2025–present) ==
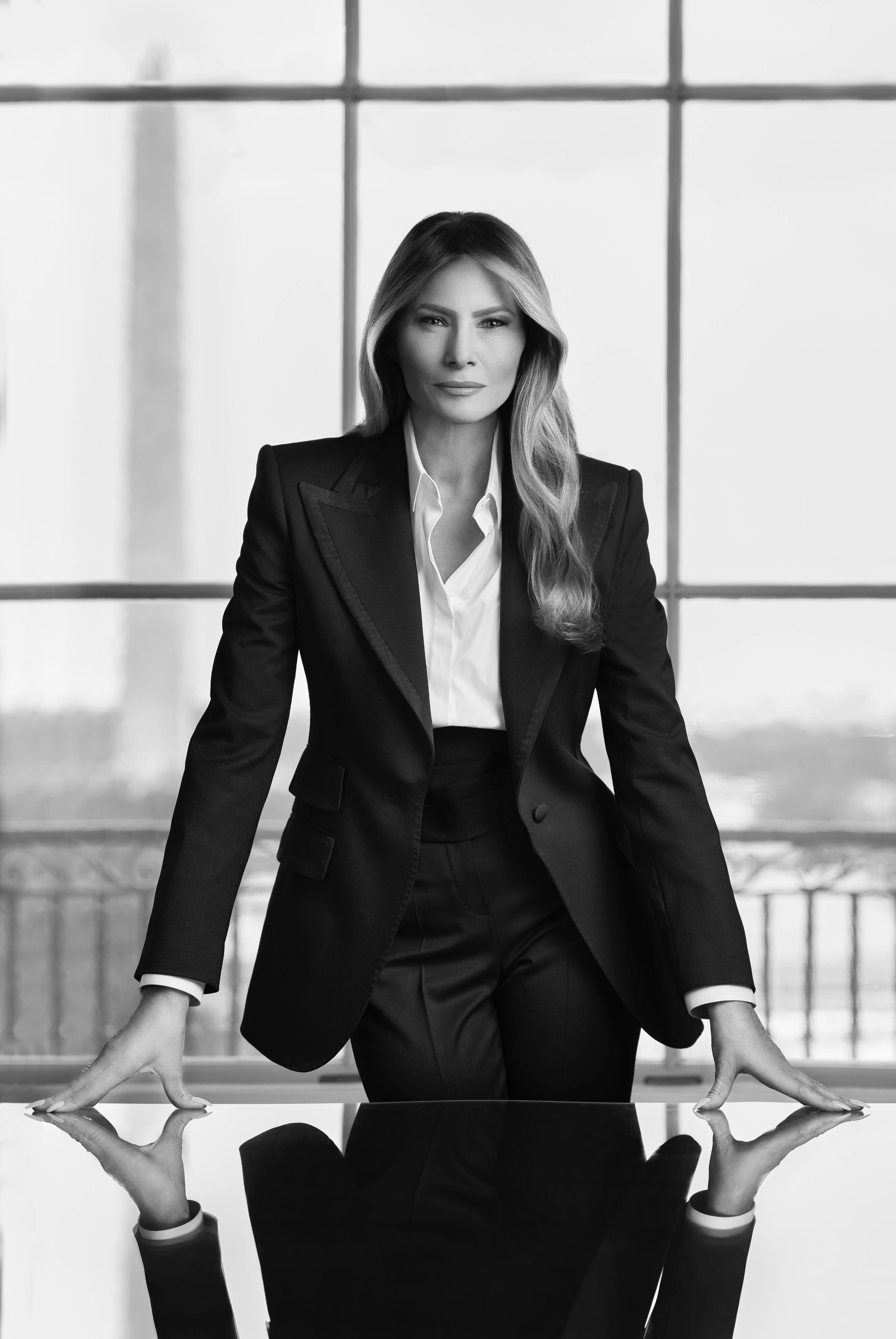
Official White House portrait, 2025

Trump is the second first lady to hold the position two times non-consecutively, after Frances Cleveland, and the first one to have assumed the role at two non-consecutive inaugurations.

=== Official duties ===
During the first few days of her second tenure as first lady, Melania traveled with President Trump to parts of North Carolina that were hit by Hurricane Helene in September 2024 and to Southern California to monitor the progress of fire rescue services for the January 2025 Southern California wildfires. In February 2025, Melania announced that public tours of the White House would resume on the 25th day of the month.

On March 3, 2025, Melania made her first solo appearance as first lady for the term by attending a roundtable discussion at Capitol Hill on the Take It Down Act, a bill that could speed the removal of intimate imagery posted online without an individual's consent, or revenge porn. Soon after, the Take it Down Act was passed unanimously in the United States Senate and almost unanimously in the United States House of Representatives. Melania was at the President's side when it was signed into law two months later and was also invited by her husband to sign the bill. In April 2025, Melania honored recipients at the annual International Women of Courage Awards and reopened tours of the White House gardens in early bloom.

On April 21, 2025, Melania hosted the White House Easter Egg Roll with her husband, which drew crowds of around 40,000. Later that week, she attended the funeral for Pope Francis. In May 2025, Melania hosted a celebration honoring military mothers and an event where a postage stamp dedicated to former first lady Barbara Bush was unveiled. Later that month, she welcomed the children of White House employees for "White House Take Our Daughters and Sons to Work Day" where she assisted kids in decorating American flags.

In June 2025, Melania attended the 2025 Congressional Picnic and the U.S. Army 250th Anniversary Parade. She traveled with President Trump to survey damage following the July 2025 Central Texas floods. On July 22, House Republicans proposed renaming the opera house at the John F. Kennedy Center for the Performing Arts after Melania.

On September 17, 2025, Melania and President Trump attended a banquet hosted by King Charles III and Queen Camilla. The following day, she appeared alongside Catherine, Princess of Wales, at Windsor Castle's Frogmore Gardens at an event highlighting scouting. On November 19, Melania traveled to Marine Corps Base Camp Lejeune with Second Lady Usha Vance to spend time with military members and their families to show appreciation for those who serve during the holiday season. Trump visited children and young adults being treated for rare and serious diseases at Children's Inn at National Institutes of Health as part of the celebrations for Valentine's Day 2026. She was involved in the planning of Chinese leader Xi Jinping's state visit to the United States in September 2026, including plans for the state dinner. She appeared together with Xi's wife Peng Liyuan during the visit; the First Ladies visited the Smithsonian Institution’s National Museum of Asian Art. In October 2026, the White House announced that Russian President Vladimir Putin and Ukrainian President Volodymyr Zelenskyy agreed to a ceasefire negotiated by her in Russian-occupied Ukrainian city of Oleshky. In November 2026, she received the Order of Princess Olga from President Zelenskyy for her significant personal contribution to humanitarian relief efforts in Ukraine.

=== Advocacy for children ===
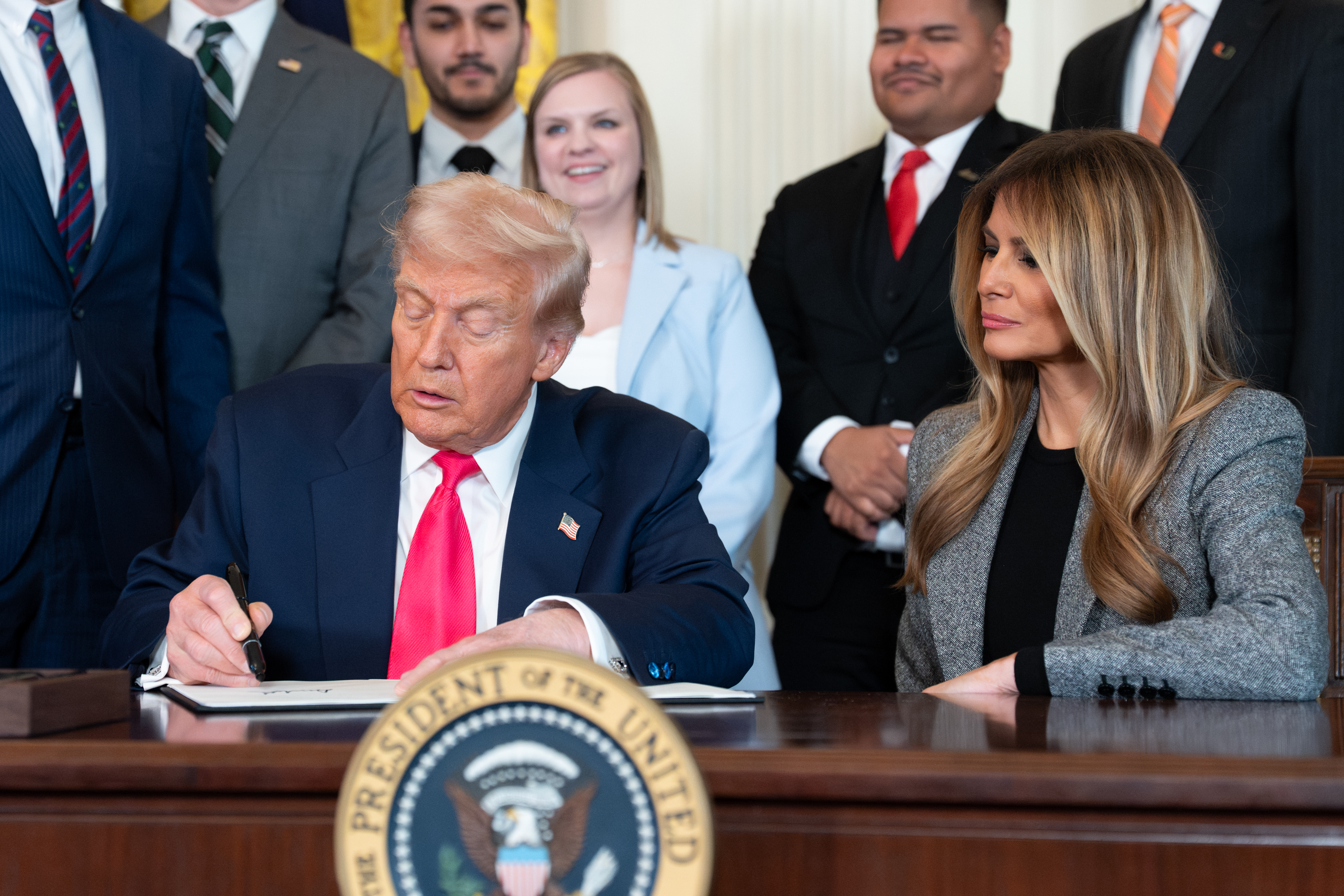
Melania Trump signing the Fostering the Future executive order with her husband on November 13, 2025

In July 2025, Melania visited patients at Children's National Hospital by bringing gifts and taking part in Independence Day activities with the children. Melania authored a letter to President Putin that President Trump hand-delivered during the August 2025 Alaska summit. The letter, published on social media, urged compassion for children affected by war and called for peace. Ukrainian President Volodymyr Zelenskyy publicly thanked her for the gesture. In October, she announced that eight children displaced during the Russo-Ukrainian war had been reunited with their families following talks with Putin. In February 2026, Melania Trump announced that she continued to work with the Russian side on the return of Ukrainian children to Ukraine. On June 10, 2026, the head of the presidential initiative Bring Kids Back UA, Maksym Maksymov, reported that Melania Trump helped return more than 30 children deported by Russia to Ukraine.

On September 23, while attending the 80th session of the United Nations General Assembly, Melania announced the launch of the global coalition Fostering the Future Together, which focuses on helping children manage changes in education, innovation, and technology. She also launched a new initiative to expand resources and improve career opportunities for teenagers transitioning out of the foster care system and also provide them with scholarships and educational opportunities. Trump addressed schools across the nation on January 16, 2026, through Zoom, discussing how students can use artificial intelligence for creativity, while also issuing a warning about how it could also hijack their thinking if they become too dependent on it. In March 2026, Melania became the first first lady to preside over a United Nations Security Council meeting; the meeting was held to discuss children, technology, and education in conflict. Later that month, she hosted a two-day Fostering the Future Together Global Coalition Summit at the State Department with representatives from 45 nations in attendance. During the summit, Melania introduced a Humanoid robot known as Figure 3, marking the first time such technology was formally introduced to international leaders in a diplomatic setting at the White House. On April 15, Melania met with lawmakers on Capitol Hill to discuss advancing her initiative on reforming the U.S. foster care system. The following month, the Fostering the Future Act, a measure backed by Melania designed to expand federal support for foster youth aging out of the child welfare system, was unanimously passed by the House of Representatives. She then released a summary of the four community-centric pillars of foster care at the 2026 United States Senate Spouses Luncheon. In August 2026, Trump announced a new partnership for her Fostering the Future initiative with IndyCar and Fox Sports as sponsors for scholarships at Indiana University and Purdue University and she was presented with a specially designed commemorative helmet. The initiative has since become part of 26 universities around the country such as University of Texas, University of North Carolina, Dominican University New York, and Pepperdine University. In September of that year, Trump visited an elementary school in Ashe County, North Carolina to discuss the use of technology and artificial intelligence in the classroom with students, teachers, and staff.

=== Influence on the president ===
Melania has possibly influenced President Trump's policy shift on the Russo-Ukrainian war. In July 2025, President Trump was quoted as saying, "I go home, I tell the first lady, 'I spoke with Vladimir today. We had a wonderful conversation.' She said, 'Oh really? Another city was just hit.'" Afterwards, President Trump laid out a 50-day deadline for a ceasefire, marking a notably antagonistic tone towards Vladimir Putin. In October 2026, President Trump signed an executive order championed by Melania to bolster federal research into women's healthcare.

=== Allegations about links to Jeffrey Epstein ===
Melania addresses the allegations between her and Epstein, April 9, 2026 (6:04)
Melania Trump addresses the allegations between her and Jeffrey Epstein, 9 April 2026 (EDT)

Melania Trump addresses the allegations between her and Jeffrey Epstein on April 9, 2026
audio only version

In August 2025, Melania threatened to sue Hunter Biden for one billion dollars after he claimed during an interview with Andrew Callaghan that Melania had been introduced to Donald by Jeffrey Epstein. When Biden publicly refused to retract his comments, Donald encouraged Melania to pursue legal action against Biden. A redacted FBI document from 2019 says Epstein introduced Knauss to Trump.

The 2025 book Entitled: The Rise and Fall of the House of York by Andrew Lownie also alleges that Melania Trump had been introduced to Donald Trump by Jeffrey Epstein. Melania Trump strongly objected to the claim and began making legal threats and representations to those involved in the publishing of the book. In October, the book's publisher, HarperCollins UK, recalled the book and apologized to Melania Trump, calling the claim unverified.

On October 22, Michael Wolff filed a lawsuit against Melania following threats her legal team had made over comments Wolff had made about Melania's ties with Jeffrey Epstein. Melania's lawyers are reported to have threatened Wolff with a one billion dollar damages claim.

On December 16, further evidence emerged of Melania's social ties to Epstein. A New York Times investigation revealed that Melania's "close friend", Suzanne Ircha—second and current wife of Trump's former UK Ambassador Woody Johnson—was one of multiple young employees at Bear Stearns whose bosses "delivered" them to Esptein's door. Epstein immediately greeted Ircha, just out of college, by asking, "You are a virgin, right?"; on a different occasion, he tickled and kissed her.

On April 9, 2026, Melania made a statement from the White House where she denied that she had ties to Epstein and his accomplice Ghislaine Maxwell. The comment was made following revelations that two emails were sent to Maxwell, one on October 23, 2002, and the other on January 1, 2003, from someone who identified as "Melania." The October 23, 2002 email involved "Melania" telling someone she identified as "GI" about a "Nice story about JE in NY mag," how "GI" looked "great on the picture," and plans to visit Palm Beach, Florida and the January 1, 2003 email featuring a direct conversation with Maxwell, where Maxwell identified "Melania" as "sweet pea" and noted that she was unable to meet with her because "plans changed" and she was now heading back to New York. Jimmy Kimmel also rebutted Melania's denial of having ties to Epstein by publishing an old photo of her with Epstein on the April 9, 2026 episode of The Jimmy Kimmel Show. No one in Trump's inner circle knew Melania had planned the press conference, including Donald Trump, himself.

On May 22, 2026, Michael Wolff's lawsuit against Melania was dismissed.

=== Demolition of East Wing ===
On October 23, 2025, CNN revealed that Melania was now "eschewing the nation's capital for New York and Palm Beach", and had been using the Office of the First Lady of the United States far less than she had during her husband's first term and now employing a "skeletal staff". During that month, The Wall Street Journal and The Hill reported that Melania privately raised concerns over her husband's demolition of the East Wing to make room for the White House State Ballroom. In November 2025, President Trump dismissed these reports saying at first Melania "loved her tiny little office" but quickly came around to support the renovation. Due to the construction of the ballroom and the East Wing's demolition, the White House announced that the 2025 holiday tours featuring Melania's decorations would instead take place on the State Floor with an updated route and guests entering from the North Portico.

=== Involvement in film and television ===
In October 2025, Melania announced Muse Films, her own production company. The company's first project, a documentary about Melania herself, titled Melania, was directed by Brett Ratner and released on January 30, 2026. This marked the first time that a self-produced documentary by a sitting first lady was released in theaters, and she reportedly was paid $28 million for it – 70% of the film's $40 million production budget. The film debuted in third place at the United States and Canadian box office with over $7 million, making it the biggest debut for a non-music documentary in a decade. Following the film's release, Amazon users protested by purchasing the erotic novel Melania: Devourer of Men, making the book the number one Amazon search result for 'Melania Trump.' The book depicts Trump as a manananggal. In May 2026, Amazon MGM Studios founder Jeff Bezos defended the decision the release the film, calling it a "very wise business decision" while also denying that it was made as a "way of buying influence" to the Trump administration. A limited two-episode series follow-up to the documentary titled, Melania the Series, began streaming on Amazon Prime Video on November 20, 2026.

== Public image ==
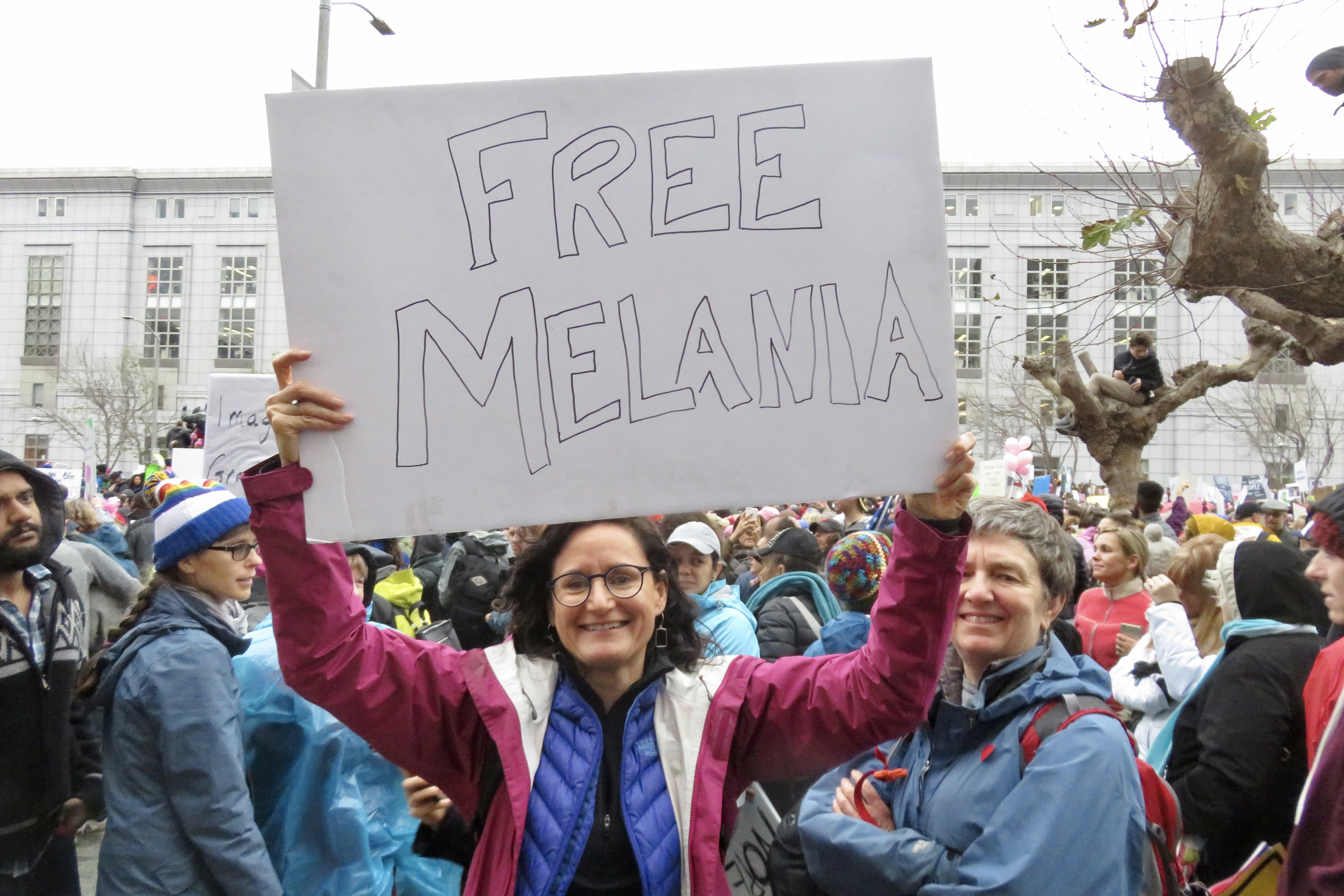
A 2017 Women's March protester with a Free Melania sign

Melania limits her interactions with the public, creating a public image heavily influenced by speculation. Because Louisa Adams, the only other first lady to be born outside of the United States, had an American father, Trump has been seen by the American public as the first foreigner to become first lady.

=== First tenure as first lady ===
In her first tenure as first lady, Trump worked to protect her privacy as first lady, and her staff was instructed not to answer any questions about her whereabouts at a given time. With limited information, commentators have portrayed her as being a reluctant companion to her husband or as a woman who has no independence of her own. Several incidents during her husband's presidency led to rumors that she had a secret animosity toward her husband, such as her delay in moving to the White House and allegations that he had committed adultery. The rumors led to popular use of the hashtag #FreeMelania by those who believed them. Though she disliked the idea that people saw her as helpless, Melania found the campaign amusing. This became less common by 2020 as she had become more publicly associated with the role of first lady. She is often seen as cold by the public, though people who interact with her describe her as a warm presence.

As with previous first ladies, Trump's fashion was heavily scrutinized, and particularly expensive pieces were criticized. More than other first ladies, her fashion was scrutinized in the context of her past as a fashion model and her marriage to a billionaire. She did her own clothes shopping, but she was assisted by designer Hervé Pierre, hair stylist Mordechai Alvow, and make up artist Nicole Byrl. When preparing for speeches, she dedicated more attention to her physical appearance than content or delivery, which her staff felt affected her ability to promote her causes. Despite her experience in fashion, she disliked that it was such a major aspect of news coverage about her as first lady.

Having a Slovenian-born woman as the American first lady became a point of national pride in Slovenia, and it gave the nation a sense of recognition on the world stage. Trump's hometown Sevnica has developed a small tourist industry around her, and Melania-themed merchandise became common during her first tenure as first lady. These items never used Melania's full name, substituting it with "first lady" or "M", as she is protective of her personality rights.

During the 2016 presidential election, Trump became the only candidate's spouse since polling began in 1988 to have a disapproval rating greater than their approval rating. Her approval rating stood at 36 or 37% in the months leading up to becoming first lady in January 2017, but it increased to 57% in a CNN poll in April 2018 after she received public sympathy amid allegations that her husband had committed adultery. Trump finished her tenure in 2021 as the least popular first lady since polling began with a rating of 42%. Multiple polls during her first tenure as first lady showed her as the most popular member of the Trump family.

In December 2020, the Siena College Research Institute released a study surveying scholars and historians on their assessments of American first ladies. It was the fifth such first ladies study that the Institute had conducted since 1982, and the first in which Trump appeared. She was ranked as being the worst of 40 assessed American first ladies, receiving the lowest assessments in all of the metrics that were weighed. In supplementary question asked of respondents (beyond the weighed criteria), Trump was ranked as the first lady who historians and scholars most-believed "could have done more" while first lady, with 34% of respondents selecting Melania as their top-choice for that descriptor. In another supplementary question, Trump's "Be Best" was ranked the least-effective signature initiative among the ten most-recent first ladies.

=== Second tenure as first lady ===
One year after assuming the role of first lady again, an Economist/YouGov poll showed that Trump had a 41% favorable rating, and a 47% unfavorable rating, with a margin of error of plus or minus 3.2%. Melanie McDonagh, writing for The Standard, said Trump is "an enigma" with "steely self discipline".

== Awards and honors ==
Country	Decoration	Date of issue
Ukraine	Order of Princess Olga, First Class	November 2, 2026

== Bibliography ==
- Baker, Peter; Glasser, Susan (2022). The Divider: Trump in the White House, 2017–2021. Knopf Doubleday Publishing Group. ISBN 978-0-385-54654-6.
- Bennett, Kate (2019). Free, Melania. Flatiron Books. ISBN 978-1-250-30737-8.
- Caroli, Betty Boyd (2019). "Chapter 11: The Ever-Changing Role of First Lady". First Ladies: The Ever Changing Role, from Martha Washington to Melania Trump. Oxford University Press. pp. 333–348. ISBN 978-0-19-066913-3.
- Elder, Laurel; Frederick, Brian; Burrell, Barbara (2018). American Presidential Candidate Spouses: The Public's Perspective. Palgrave Macmillan. doi:10.1007/978-3-319-73879-6. ISBN 978-3-319-73878-9.
- Jordan, Mary (2020). The Art of Her Deal: The Untold Story of Melania Trump. Simon and Schuster. ISBN 978-1-9821-1340-7.
- Požar, Bojan (February 18, 2016). Melania Trump – The Inside Story: The Potential First Lady. Zalozba Ombo d.o.o. Ljubljana. pp. 111–113.
- Pušnik, Maruša; Jontes, Dejan (2021). "Mediji in Spontani Nacionalizem: Primer Melanie Trump" [Media and Spontaneous Nationalism: The Case of Melania Trump] (PDF). Teorija in Praksa (in Slovenian). 58 (2): 464–480. doi:10.51936/tip.58.2.464-480. ISSN 0040-3598.
- Vidmar Horvat, Ksenija (2021). "Postimperialni Patriarhat In Karnevaleskna Periferija: Melania Trump V Transnacionalni Javnosti" [Post-Imperial Patriarchy and the Carnivalesque Periphery: Melania Trump Within a Transnational Public] (PDF). Teorija in Praksa (in Slovenian). 58 (2): 447–463. doi:10.51936/tip.58.2.447-463. ISSN 0040-3598.

Honorary titles
Preceded by Michelle Obama	First Lady of the United States; 2017–2021	Succeeded by Jill Biden
Preceded by Jill Biden	First Lady of the United States; 2025–present	Incumbent
