= Jere (name) =

Jere is a masculine given name and a surname. The given name is often a short form of names such as Jerald or Jeremiah.

== Given name ==
- Empress Xiaoduanwen (1600–1649), personal name Jere (or Jerjer), Empress Consort of Hong Taiji of the Qing Dynasty
- Jere Abbott (1897–1982), American art historian and first associate director of the Museum of Modern Art
- Jere Allen, American painter and former art professor
- Jere L. Bacharach (1938–2023), American history professor emeritus
- Jere Baxter (1852–1904), American businessman, lawyer and politician
- Jere Beasley (born 1935), American attorney and politician
- Jere Bergius (born 1987), Finnish pole vaulter
- Jere Brophy, American educational psychologist
- Jere Cooper (1893–1957), American politician
- Jere Elliott (born 1946), American alpine skier
- Jere Gillis (born 1957), American National Hockey League player
- Jere Hård (born 1978), Finnish swimmer
- Jere Hargrove (born 1946), American politician
- Jere T. Humphreys (born 1949), American music scholar
- Jere Kallinen (born 2002), Finnish footballer
- Jere Karalahti (born 1975), Finnish ice hockey player
- Jere Karjalainen (born 1992), Finnish ice hockey player
- Jere Laaksonen (born 1991), Finnish ice hockey player
- Jere Lehtinen (born 1973), Finnish National Hockey League player
- Jere H. Lipps (born 1939), American paleontologist, academic and skeptic
- Jere Michael (born 1977), American figure skater
- Jere Morehead, American lawyer, law professor and President of the University of Georgia
- Jere Myllyniemi (born 1983), Finnish ice hockey player
- Jere Ölander (born 1989), Finnish ice hockey player
- Jere Osgood (born 1936), American furniture maker and teacher
- Jere Pöyhönen (born 1993), Finnish rapper, singer and songwriter
- Jere Pulli (born 1991), Finnish ice hockey player
- Jere Ratcliffe, Chief Scout Executive (1993–2000) of the Boy Scouts of America
- Jere Riissanen (born 2005), Finnish footballer
- Jere Sallinen (born 1990), Finnish ice hockey player
- Jere Schuler (born 1934), American politician
- Jere Seppälä (born 1993), Finnish ice hockey player
- Jere Strittmatter (born 1950), American politician
- Jere Uronen (born 1994), Finnish footballer
- Jere Wood, mayor of Roswell, Georgia, United States

== Surname ==
- Besnat Jere, Zambian politician, member of the Pan-African Parliament
- Dickson Jere, Zambian lawyer, journalist, author and political analyst
- Otria Moyo Jere (born 1959), Malawian politician, Deputy Minister of Education, Science and Technology beginning 2009
