= Jerko Skračić =

Croatian journalist and poet

- Born: Jerolim Skračić; May 13, 1918; Murter, Austria-Hungary
- Died: 1945 or 1947
- Occupations: journalist, poet
- Years active: 1940–1945
- Known for: Osunčani otoci Stihovi

Jerko (Jerolim) Skračić (13 May 1918 – 1945 or 1947) was a Croatian journalist and poet.

== Biography ==
He was born in Murter, where he attended elementary school. In Preko he attended a Franciscan gymnasium. He enrolled at the Faculty of Law in Zagreb, but didn't graduate because he was a political prisoner in Lepoglava. He described the experience in Lepoglava in his book Pod drugim ključem: sjećanja na život ustaških zatočenika u Lepoglavi 1940. i 1941. god.

He was released in 1942 and lived shortly in Berlin. Following his return to Croatia, he became the editor of a weekly newspaper Hrvatski tjednik in Zagreb, and the director of a radio station in Sarajevo. He wrote for Hrvatski krugoval, Glasnik sv. Ante and other magazines.

His death is disputed: some sources claim he was killed on his way to Bleiburg, while others claim he was imprisoned and died two years later.

== Works ==
He published the following works:

- Pod drugim ključem: sjećanja na život ustaških zatočenika u Lepoglavi 1940. i 1941. god. (1942)
- Osunčani otoci (1944)
- Stihovi (1945)
