= Jere Riissanen =

Finnish footballer (born 2005)

Personal information
- Date of birth: 18 June 2005 (age 21)
- Place of birth: Finland
- Position: Centre back

Team information
- Current team: Jazz (on loan from Ilves)

Youth career
- 2012–2021: Ilves

Senior career*
Years	Team	Apps	(Gls)
2022–	Ilves II	50	(1)
2022–	Ilves	7	(0)
2025–	→ Jazz (loan)	0	(0)

International career^{‡}
2022	Finland U17	1	(0)
2022	Finland U18	3	(0)
- * Club domestic league appearances and goals as of 19 October 2024 ‡ National team caps and goals as of 21 February 2024

Jere Riissanen (born 18 June 2005) is a Finnish professional football player who plays as a centre back for Ykkönen side Jazz, on loan from Ilves.

== Club career ==
Riissanen started football in the youth sector of Ilves when aged seven. He debuted in Veikkausliiga with Ilves first team in October 2022.

On 10 January 2025, Ilves announced that Riissanen's contract was extended until the end of 2026, and he was immediately thereafter sent on loan to Ykkönen club Jazz for the 2025 season.

== Career statistics ==
As of 23 October 2024.

Appearances and goals by club, season and competition
Club	Season	League			Cup (Note: Includes Suomen Cup)		League cup (Note: Includes Finnish League Cup)		Europe		Total	
Club	Season	Division	Apps	Goals	Apps	Goals	Apps	Goals	Apps	Goals	Apps	Goals
Ilves II	2022	Kakkonen	21	0	3	0	–		–		24	0
Ilves II	2023	Kakkonen	16	0	–		–		–		16	0
Ilves II	2024	Kakkonen	13	1	–		–		–		13	1
Ilves II	Total		50	1	3	0	0	0	0	0	53	1
Ilves	2022	Veikkausliiga	1	0	0	0	0	0	–		1	0
Ilves	2023	Veikkausliiga	2	0	0	0	0	0	–		2	0
Ilves	2024	Veikkausliiga	4	0	0	0	2	0	0	0	6	0
Ilves	Total		7	0	0	0	2	0	0	0	9	0
Jazz (loan)	2025	Ykkönen	0	0	0	0	–		–		0	0
Career total			57	1	3	0	2	0	0	0	62	1

== Honours ==
Ilves

- Veikkausliiga runner-up: 2024
