= Jere Allen =

American painter

Jere Allen is a visual artist and a former professor of art at the University of Mississippi.

== Life ==
Allen was born in 1944 in Selma, Alabama. He received a BFA degree from the Ringling School of Art, and an MFA from the University of Tennessee.

== Work ==
His work can be described as figurative and is typically inspired by myths and symbols.he was labeled in 1999 by a regional newspaper as "the Mississippi Rembrandt". Art and Antiques has described Allen as a "modern-day master" known for his "dramatic, electric colors."

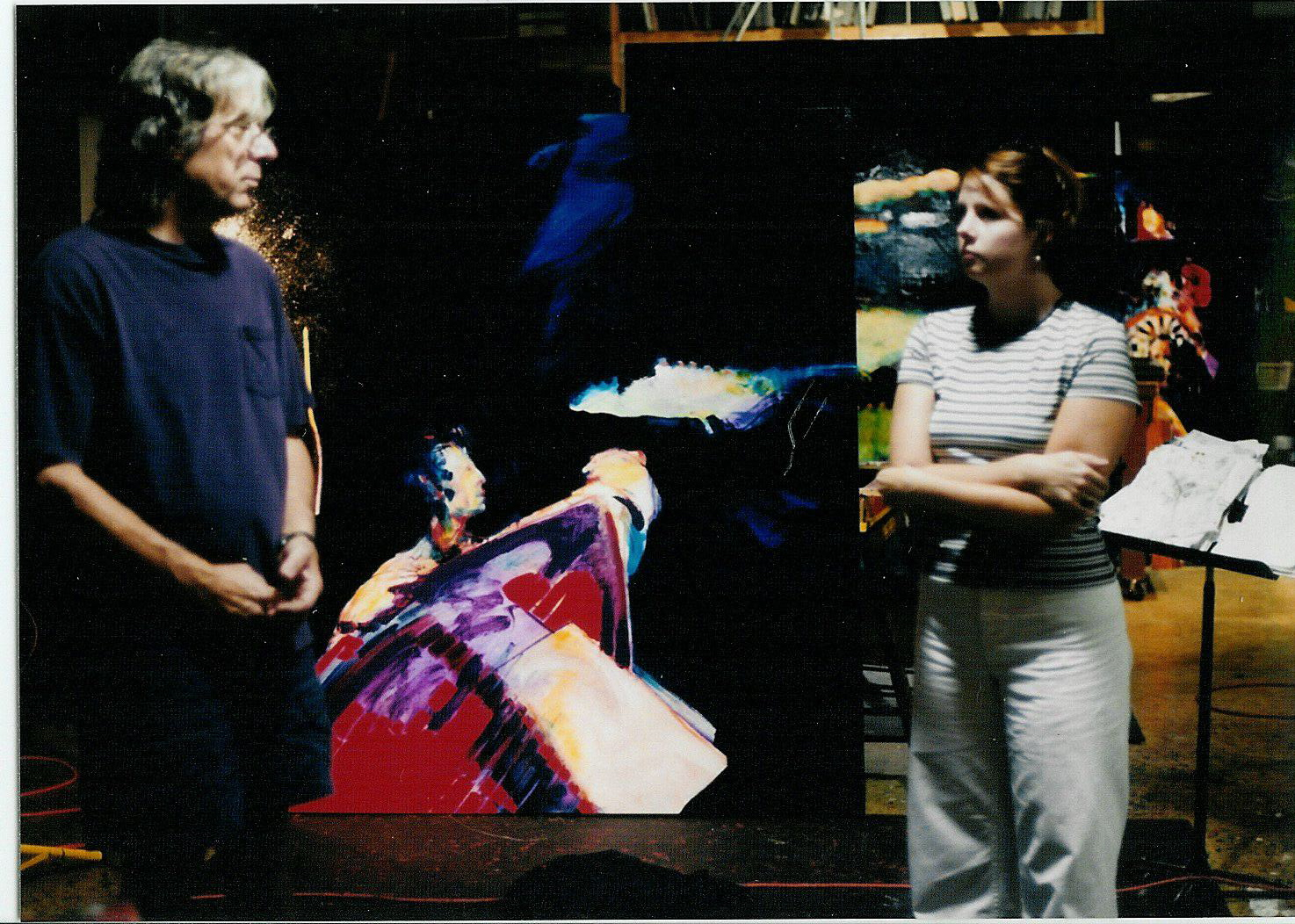
Jere Allen in his Oxford, Mississippi, studio, 2001.

His work can be found at the Huntsville Museum of Art and Mobile Museum of Art, both of which are in Alabama. They can also be found at the Meridian Museum of Art, Mississippi, and Coos Art Museum, in Coos Bay, Oregon.

In 2003, Allen's work toured Southeast Asia in the Washington-based Meridian International Center's exhibition, Outward Bound: American Art at the Brink of the Twenty-First Century.
