= Jere Pulli =

Finnish ice hockey player

- Born: June 17, 1991 (age 35) Lappeenranta, Finland
- Height: 6 ft 2 in (188 cm)
- Weight: 209 lb (95 kg; 14 st 13 lb)
- Position: Defence
- Shoots: Left
- Erste Liga team Former teams: Ferencvárosi TC; SaiPa; HC TPS; Rødovre Mighty Bulls; MHC Martin; HC Košice
- NHL draft: Undrafted
- Playing career: 2010–present

Jere Pulli (born June 17, 1991) is a Finnish ice hockey defenceman. He is currently a free agent having last played for HC Košice in the Slovak Extraliga.

Pulli made his SM-liiga debut playing with SaiPa during the 2010–11 season.
