= Be Best =

Public-awareness campaign by Melania Trump

- Mission statement: Focuses on youth well-being, combating cyberbullying and opioid abuse, and expanding to include combating revenge porn and improving the lives of children in foster care.
- Commercial?: No
- Type of project: Public-awareness campaign
- Products: Educational pamphlets and launch video
- Location: United States (promoted internationally in Ghana, Malawi, Kenya, and Egypt)
- Founder: Melania Trump
- Country: United States
- Established: 7 May 2018
- Disestablished: 2021 (resumed 2025)
- Funding: Promotes existing initiatives and organizations
- Status: Active (resumed as of 2025)
- Website: https://trumpwhitehouse.archives.gov/bebest/

Be Best is a public-awareness campaign first promoted by First Lady Melania Trump. It began in 2018 and continued until 2021 before resuming in 2025. Its initial focuses included youth well-being and combating cyberbullying; the initiative's scope was expanded to include combating revenge porn and improving the lives and well-being of children, including those in foster care during her second tenure as first lady.

== Background ==
Five days before the 2016 election, Melania told a crowd of supporters in Pennsylvania: "Our culture has gotten too mean and too rough, especially to children and teenagers. It is never okay when a 12-year-old girl or boy is mocked, bullied, or attacked. It is terrible when that happens on the playground. And it is absolutely unacceptable when it is done by someone with no name hiding on the Internet". Regarding the contrast of her platform with her husband's use of social media during his campaign, Melania said shortly after the election that she had rebuked him "all the time", but that "he will do what he wants to do in the end".

On March 13, 2018, Melania scheduled a March 20, 2018 meeting with policy executives from technology companies — including Amazon, Facebook, Google, Snap, and Twitter — to address online harassment and Internet safety, with a particular focus on how those issues and modern technology affect children. In her opening remarks at the roundtable event, she said: "I am well aware that people are skeptical of me discussing this topic", but "that will not stop me from doing what I know is right" — seemingly a response to criticism for championing Internet civility while her husband's Internet behavior had been noted as uncivil.

== Campaign ==
Be Best official launch video and announcement (17 minutes)

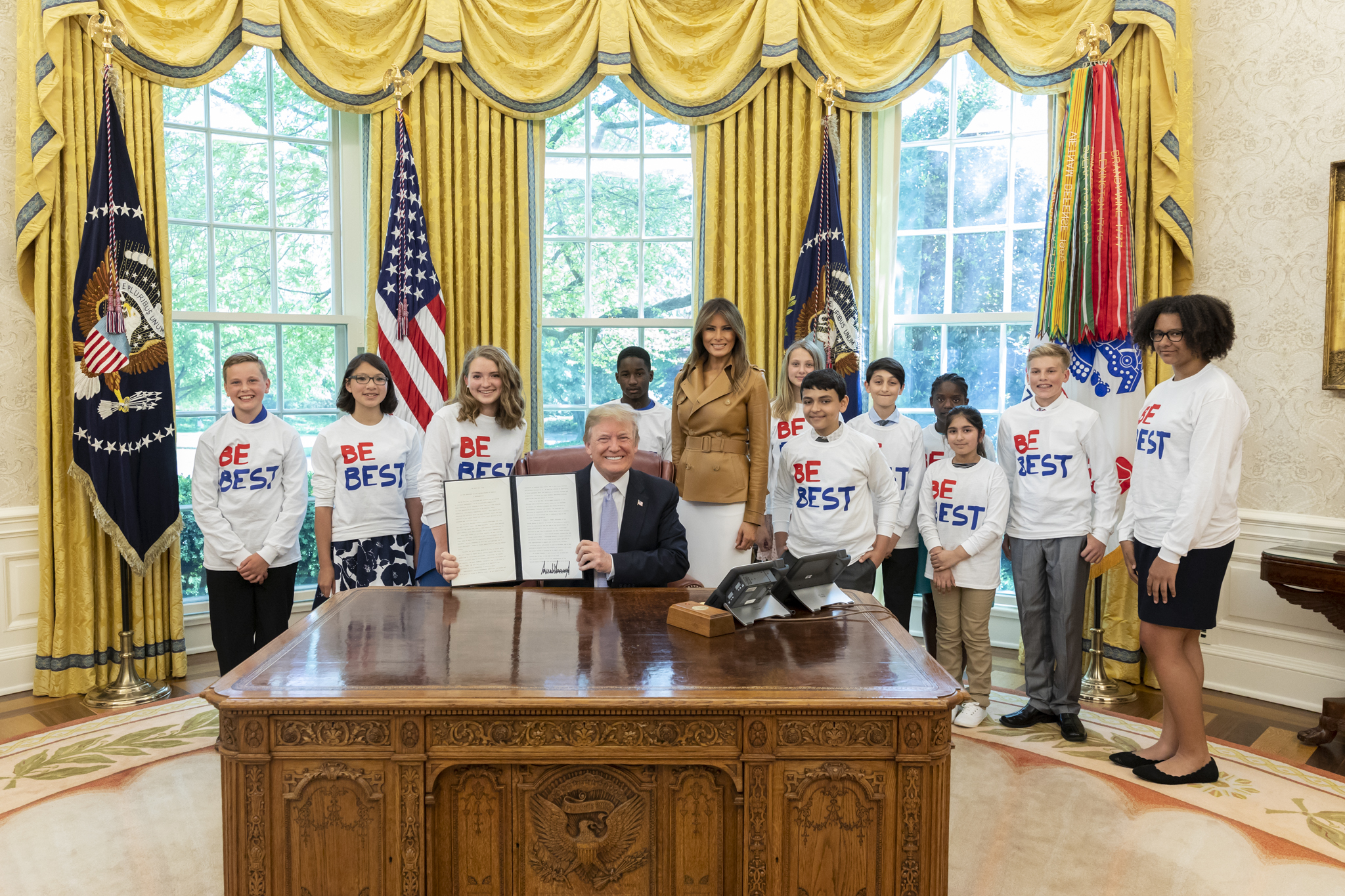
President Donald Trump and First Lady Melania Trump with students in the Oval Office at the announcement of the initiative

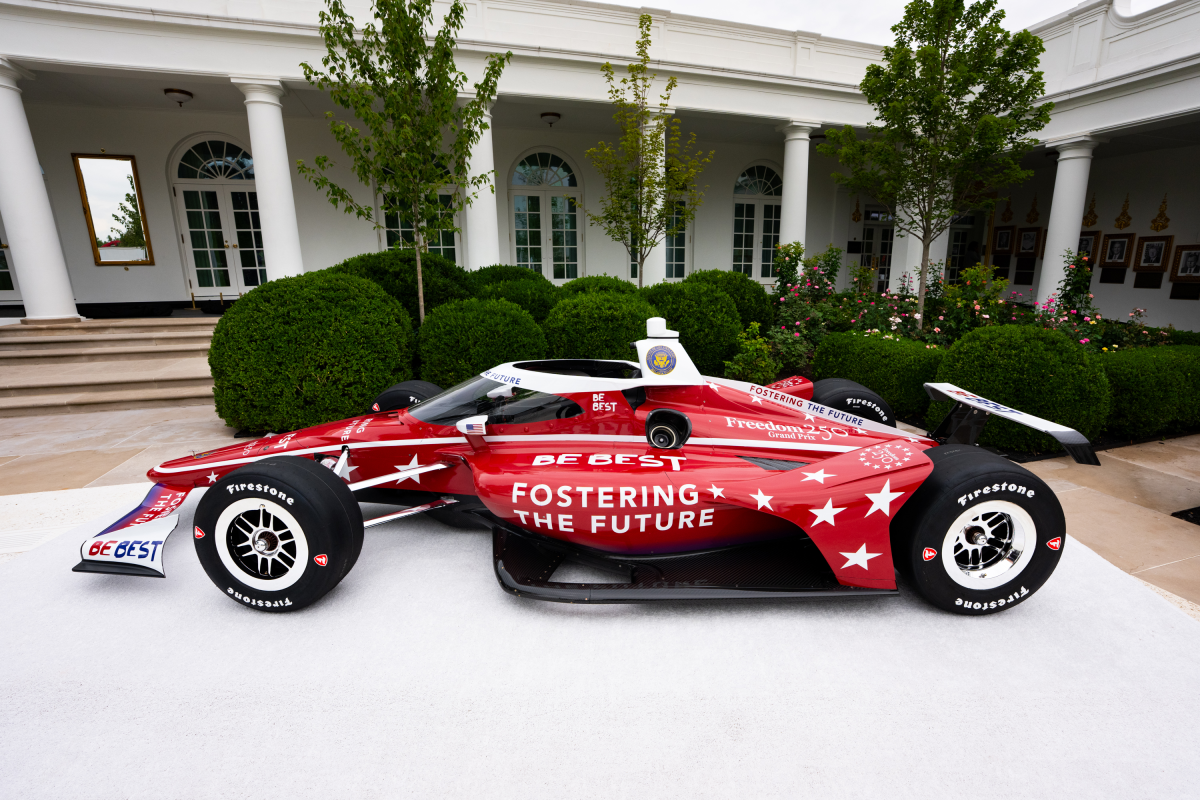
IndyCar race car featuring BE BEST and Fostering the Future branding displayed in the White House Rose Garden

Melania Trump created the initiative and came up with the name "Be Best". She said she was prepared for criticism.

On May 7, 2018, Melania Trump formally started the Be Best public awareness campaign, which focused on well-being for youth and advocated against cyberbullying and opioid abuse. She made the announcement in the White House Rose Garden, a space more typically used for major political announcements from the president. Instead of creating new programs like previous first ladies' projects, Be Best promoted existing initiatives and organizations that worked toward the cause. Public awareness of the initiative remained low, and it was often regarded solely as an anti-cyberbullying campaign.

She formally introduced the campaign on May 7, 2018. Following her speech in the White House Rose Garden, President Donald Trump signed a proclamation declaring May 7 "Be Best" day. Unlike policy initiatives by previous first ladies (such as Michelle Obama's Let's Move! campaign against childhood obesity, or Nancy Reagan's Just Say No to drugs campaign), Be Best is broad in scope. The initiative focuses on physical and emotional well-being, and also advocates against cyberbullying and opioid abuse.

The initiative began with a very slow start, as Melania Trump underwent kidney surgery one week after the campaign was launched. She made no public appearances for the next several weeks. On July 24, 2018, she visited the Monroe Carell Jr. Children's Hospital at Vanderbilt in Nashville, Tennessee, and talked about children with neonatal withdrawal. On August 6, 2018, she tweeted: "It's #Backtoschool for many youth this month. As you begin a new year, how will you be the best you? #BeBest". She spoke at a cyberbullying summit outside Washington, D.C., on August 20, 2018.

During the initiative's first year, she also promoted Be Best in person at events in Oklahoma, Washington state, and Nevada. She also promoted Be Best abroad in trips to Ghana, Malawi, Kenya, and Egypt. In August 2026, Trump was presented with a specially designed commemorative "Be Best" helmet after announcing a new partnership for her Fostering the Future initiative with IndyCar and Fox Sports as sponsors for scholarships at Indiana University and Purdue University. At the time of the partnersip, the initiative had become part of 26 universities around the country such as University of Texas, University of North Carolina, Dominican University New York, and Pepperdine University.

In 2020, when scholars and historians were asked during the Siena College Research Institute's first ladies study to assess the signature initiatives of the then most-recent ten first ladies (those from Lady Bird Johnson onward), "Be Best" was ranked as the least-effective.

== Criticism ==
The slogan "Be Best" has faced criticism for having an apparent grammatical error, as in English there would be a definite article, and would therefore read: "Be the Best". The Guardian noted, however, that Mrs. Trump's native language, Slovenian, does not use definite articles. According to The New Yorker, the name is a childlike attempt to one-up "Be better", the catchphrase that Michelle Obama is known to have used during her tenure as First Lady. Mrs. Trump's senior advisor, Stephanie Winston Wolkoff, called the slogan "illiterate" and pushed for an alternative slogan, "Children First", which the First Lady rejected due to the similarities with her husband's "America First" branding. She commented to her staff that "at least they won't say I plagiarized it".

Melania Trump faced accusations of plagiarization of a Michelle Obama speech when, as part of her "Be Best" campaign in 2018, she gave a speech that appeared to closely echo remarks by Michelle Obama in 2016 and also distributed a written pamphlet that was nearly identical to one published under the Obama administration in 2014.

The Be Best campaign drew criticism over perceived hypocrisy for its goal of challenging cyberbullying as her husband Donald Trump was well known for attacking people on social media. The comparison was noted upon by Donald Trump prior to his campaign's launch that the contrast could provoke criticism. She acknowledged the discrepancy but insisted that she would continue because she felt it was a good cause. On December 12, 2019, Melania Trump's "#BeBest" hashtag trended on Twitter after the President sent a critical tweet directed to then 16-year-old climate activist Greta Thunberg. Several media outlets noted that Melania Trump criticized legal expert Pamela Karlan the previous week after Karlan had mentioned the Trumps' teenage son, Barron, during testimony as part of the then ongoing impeachment inquiry. The First Lady's office responded that spouses can communicate differently and that Barron was not "an activist who travels the globe giving speeches".

== Sources ==
- Bennett, Kate (2019). Free, Melania. Flatiron Books. ISBN 978-1-250-30737-8.
- Caroli, Betty Boyd (2019). "Chapter 11: The Ever-Changing Role of First Lady". First Ladies: The Ever Changing Role, from Martha Washington to Melania Trump. Oxford University Press. pp. 333–348. ISBN 978-0-19-066913-3.
- Jordan, Mary (2020). The Art of Her Deal: The Untold Story of Melania Trump. Simon and Schuster. ISBN 978-1-9821-1340-7.
