= Stephanie Winston Wolkoff =

American fashion and entertainment executive

Personal details
- Born: Stephanie Batinkoff; January 21, 1971 (age 54)
- Children: 3
- Relatives: Randall Batinkoff (brother); Harry Winston (grandfather)
- Education: Loyola University, New Orleans (BA)

Stephanie Winston Wolkoff (born Batinkoff, January 21, 1971) is an American fashion and entertainment executive and former senior advisor to the first lady Melania Trump. Before her role in politics she produced various notable events in New York City, including the Met Gala, and later worked as the founding fashion director for Lincoln Center facilitating the expansion of its Mercedes-Benz Fashion Week.

== Early life ==
Wolkoff was born to parents Barbara (née Carnel) and Barry Batinkoff and raised in the Catskills. Her family is Jewish. Wolkoff is the sister of actor Randall Batinkoff. She attended Fordham University, where she played NCAA Division I basketball as a power forward for two years. She then transferred to Loyola University New Orleans where she was graduated with a degree in communications.

== Career ==
Her first job was as a lobbyist for Sotheby's, and she later worked as an assistant to New York concert promoter Ron Delsener. In 1996 Wolkoff started working for Vogue magazine as a public relations manager where she helped organize events such as the VH1 Fashion Awards and the Met Gala. After briefly resigning in 2010 she was rehired by Anna Wintour who installed Wolkoff as fashion director for New York Fashion Week. She met Melania Knauss, then Donald Trump's girlfriend, in 2003 while working for Vogue, and the two became friends. She attended the Trump wedding and Melania's baby shower, and they lunched together regularly. She says Melania was like "the sister I never had before".

=== Role in the Trump administration ===
In 2016, Wolkoff created an event planning firm, WIS Media Partners, which was instrumental in organizing the Inauguration of Donald Trump in January 2017. Wolkoff's firm was paid $26 million for their services: about one-quarter of the total expenses of the inauguration. According to a tax filing most of the money went to other vendors and a dozen staff members.

Early in the Trump Administration Wolkoff was named as an unpaid senior advisor to first lady Melania Trump. Melania Trump cut ties with Wolkoff on February 26, 2018. Wolkoff resigned that month after the extent of her firm's compensation for organizing the inaugural festivities was reported. She says she was "scapegoated" and that only $1.6 million of the $26 million went to her personally.

== Melania and Me ==
In 2020, Wolkoff published a tell-all book, Melania and Me, about her experiences in the White House with Donald and Melania Trump. The book contains extensive direct quotes from Melania Trump. When asked how that was possible Wolkoff explained that after her relations with the first lady soured she began recording conversations. The Trump Justice Department filed a civil suit against Wolkoff in October 2019 alleging breach of a nondisclosure agreement, which the Biden Justice Department dropped in February 2021.

On October 1, 2020, Wolkoff released audio tapes to CNN of conversations she had with Melania Trump in 2018. The conversations were recorded without the former First Lady's knowledge, and in part revealed embarrassing episodes. In one clip, Mrs. Trump noted the expectations of her around holidays, saying, “I’m working ... my ass off on the Christmas stuff, that you know, who gives a fuck about the Christmas stuff and decorations? But I need to do it, right?” Melania Trump responded saying, "She hardly knew me... This is a woman who secretly recorded our phone calls, releasing portions from me that were out of context, then wrote a book of idle gossip trying to distort my character."

== Personal life ==
After her parents' divorce she was adopted by her mother's second husband, Bruce Winston, the son of jeweler Harry Winston. In 1996 Wolkoff met her husband, real estate developer David Wolkoff, and they married in March 2000. They have three children.

== Bibliography ==
- Melania and Me (2020)
