= Erika Jensen-Jarolim =

Austrian physician and medical researcher in immunology and allergies

Erika Jensen-Jarolim (born 1960) is an Austrian physician and medical researcher in immunology and allergies. She was formerly head of the Institute of Pathophysiology and Allergy Research at the Medical University of Vienna, and since 2011 has held the joint professorship in Comparative Medicine at the Medical University and the University of Veterinary Medicine Vienna, part of the inter-university Messerli Research Institute.

== Education and career ==
Jensen-Jarolim earned her degree in human medicine in 1985 in Vienna, and since then has specialised in allergology and immunology. After her habilitation she founded an independent research group in 1999, completed her medical specialisation in immunology in 2000, and in 2007 became professor of pathophysiology. From 2004 to 2008, she was a board member of the Austrian Society of Allergology and Immunology (ÖGAI), and from 2006 to 2011 she headed the Institute of Pathophysiology and Allergy Research at the Medical University of Vienna, and from 2008 to 2011 was also on the University Senate of the Medical University of Vienna. In 2006, she founded the Verein Rote Pfote (Red Paw Organisation) in cooperation with the Medical University of Vienna and the University of Veterinary Medicine Vienna, to facilitate research into cancer and its treatment in animals and humans. In August 2011 she became the first of four professors appointed to the inter-university Messerli-Research Institute, founded in January 2010, where she is Professor of Comparative Medicine, a joint appointment of the two universities. Since 2014 she has been deputy editor of the World Allergy Organization Journal.

She is a founder and Scientific Consultant of Biomedical International R + D GmbH, a company which is developing vaccines for allergy and cancer.

== Research and publications ==
A main focus of Jensen-Jarolim's research is pathophysiological mechanisms for allergies and oncology such as mimotope vaccines and food allergies. Her laboratory has studied the major allergen in birch pollen, Bet v 1 since the late 1980s, and has worked out a mechanism by which Bet v I causes allergies. She has studied the inverse correlation between allergy and cancer. To foster research on the function of IgE in cancer she claims to have coined the term allergooncology at the 2006 meeting of the Collegium Internationale Allergologicum and hosted the first International AllergoOncology Symposium in Vienna the following year. Jensen-Jarolim has co-authored a dictionary of allergology and immunology and co-edited a textbook on AllergoOncology and edited a textbook on comparative anatomy and physiology.

== Honours ==
Among honours she has received is the bronze medal at KIWIE 2010, in Seoul, for tumor vaccine technology.
