= Stane Jerko =

Slovenian fashion photographe

Stane Jerko (born 1937) is a Slovenian fashion photographer, best known for "discovering" Melania Trump.

Jerko was born in 1937, and studied at the Faculty of Electrical Engineering, but his passion was always for photography.

Jerko first noticed the then Melanija Knavs, aged 16, in January 1987, while she was sitting on the stairs, waiting for her friends to finish a fashion show in her hometown of Novo Mesto.

His work is in the permanent collection of the Museum of Modern Art, Ljubljana, Slovenia.
