= Early life and education of Donald Trump =

Life of Donald Trump from 1946 to 1968

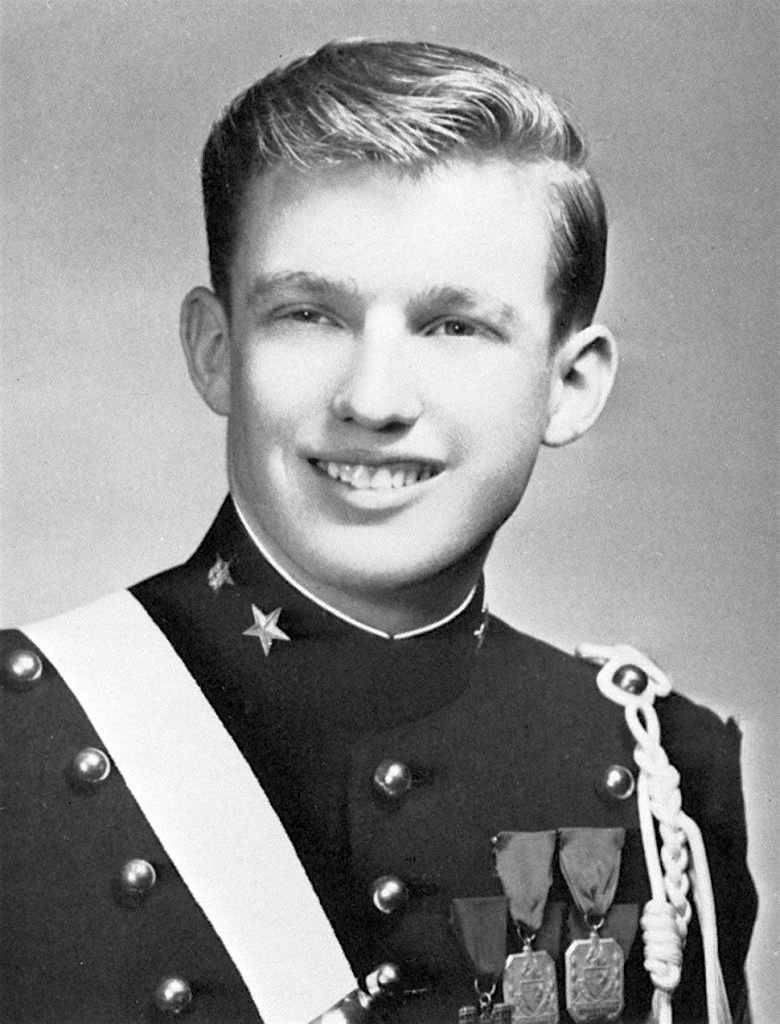
Trump's New York Military Academy portrait with borrowed medals

Donald Trump, the 45th and 47th president of the United States, was born on June 14, 1946, in New York City to Fred Trump, a real-estate developer, and Mary Anne MacLeod Trump. He was raised in a strict household and developed a rebellious and braggadocious personality early in his youth.

Trump enrolled at the Kew-Forest School, a private school affiliated with Fred, when he was five. He developed an aptitude for a variety of sports, particularly baseball. In his seventh-grade year, Fred discovered that Trump had secretly been going to Manhattan, where he acquired knives. Fred sent Trump to New York Military Academy from which he graduated in May 1964.

After graduating from the academy, he attended Fordham University from 1964 to 1966, studying economics. His college enrollment—and later a medical exemption—allowed him to defer the Vietnam War draft. Early in his sophomore year, seeking a larger business network, Trump transferred to the Wharton School at the University of Pennsylvania, an institution favored by his father. He did not participate in extracurricular activities after his freshman year. Trump graduated from the University of Pennsylvania in May 1968 with a Bachelor of Science in economics.

== Early life ==
=== Heritage and childhood ===
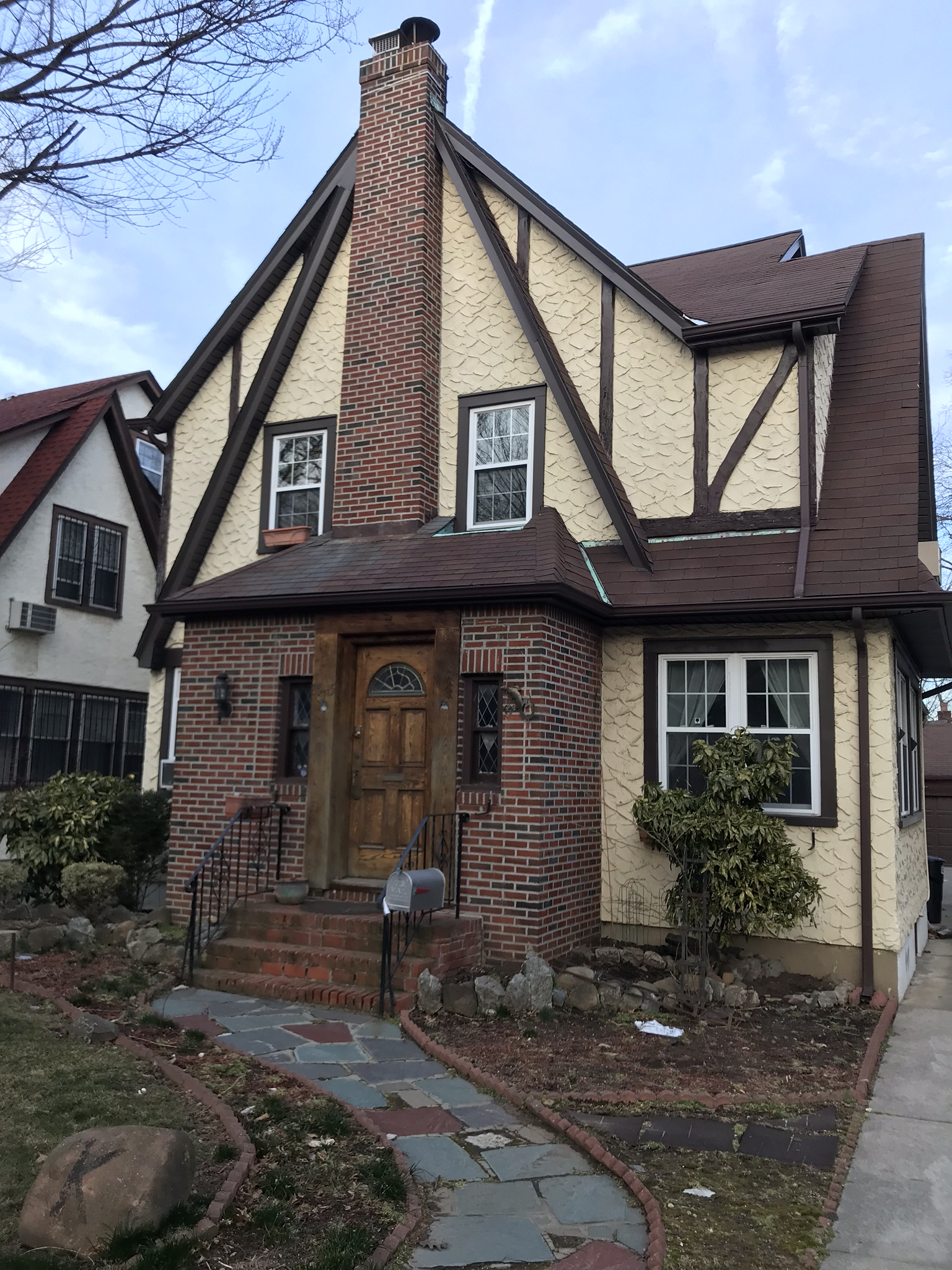
85-15 Wareham Place in Queens, New York, where Trump lived until he was four

Donald John Trump was born on June 14, 1946, at Jamaica Hospital Medical Center in Jamaica, Queens, New York City. Named for his maternal and paternal uncles, Trump was the fourth child and second son of Mary Anne MacLeod Trump and Frederick Christ Trump. (Note: Fred and Mary had three children before Donald: Maryanne (1937–2023), Fred Jr. (1938–1981), and Elizabeth (born 1942), and one child afterward: Robert (1948–2020).) Mary Anne was a daughter of a rural fisherman-farmer who emigrated to the United States from Stornoway, Scotland, when she was eighteen. She worked as a domestic servant in the Carnegie household in New York, where she grew enamored of wealth and the trappings of royalty—an affinity to which Donald fell heir. (Note: Trump wrote later in The Art of the Deal that he inherited his mother's sense of showmanship (1987).) After marriage, Mary Anne was a homemaker. In the aftermath of World War II, Fred shifted from building houses to FHA-insured apartment construction, bringing him increased prominence in the New York real-estate scene. Fred was a businessman prone to profiteering who held profound sway over his children, repeatedly telling Trump that he was a "king" and a "killer". Trump was also influenced by the Protestant clergyman Norman Vincent Peale, who authored The Power of Positive Thinking (1952) (Note: Later Trump would emulate Peale's The Power of Positive Thinking (1952) in The Art of the Deal (1987).) and preached self-confidence as the impetus for prosperity. (Note: Trump later described Peale and his father as the only two mentors in his life.)

The Trumps, having moved from Devonshire Street by 1946, occupied 85-15 Wareham Place in Jamaica Estates, a modest, two-story Tudor-Revival townhouse that Fred had constructed in the 1920s. The size of the small house presented issues for the Trumps, then six in number, and Fred began constructing a house on a double lot that backed into 85-15 Wareham Place on Midland Parkway, establishing 85-14 Midland Parkway. The Trumps moved into the nine-room, Colonial-style (Note: The house at 85-14 Midland Parkway is referred to as Colonial-Georgian by Wayne Barrett in Trump (2016), but its architecture is also described as Colonial Revival by Michael D'Antonio in Never Enough (2015) and by Susanne Craig and Russ Buettner in Lucky Loser (2024).) mansion in 1948, prior to the birth of Robert Trump. The mansion's stature contrasted with the commonplace Tudor-style townhouses in Jamaica Estates; Trump later described Jamaica Estates as separated from the "rough" areas of Queens. Fred, according to his children, constantly worked, though he would attempt to incorporate his children wherever possible. After Robert's arduous birth that year, Mary Anne began experiencing hemorrhages and had an emergency hysterectomy. Trump acquired a fear of germs and shaking hands. The Trumps were subject to curfews and strict rules, including prohibitions on swearing and eating between meals. According to younger associates of the Trumps, offenders would face punishments ranging from groundings to spankings with a wooden spoon.

=== Early schooling ===
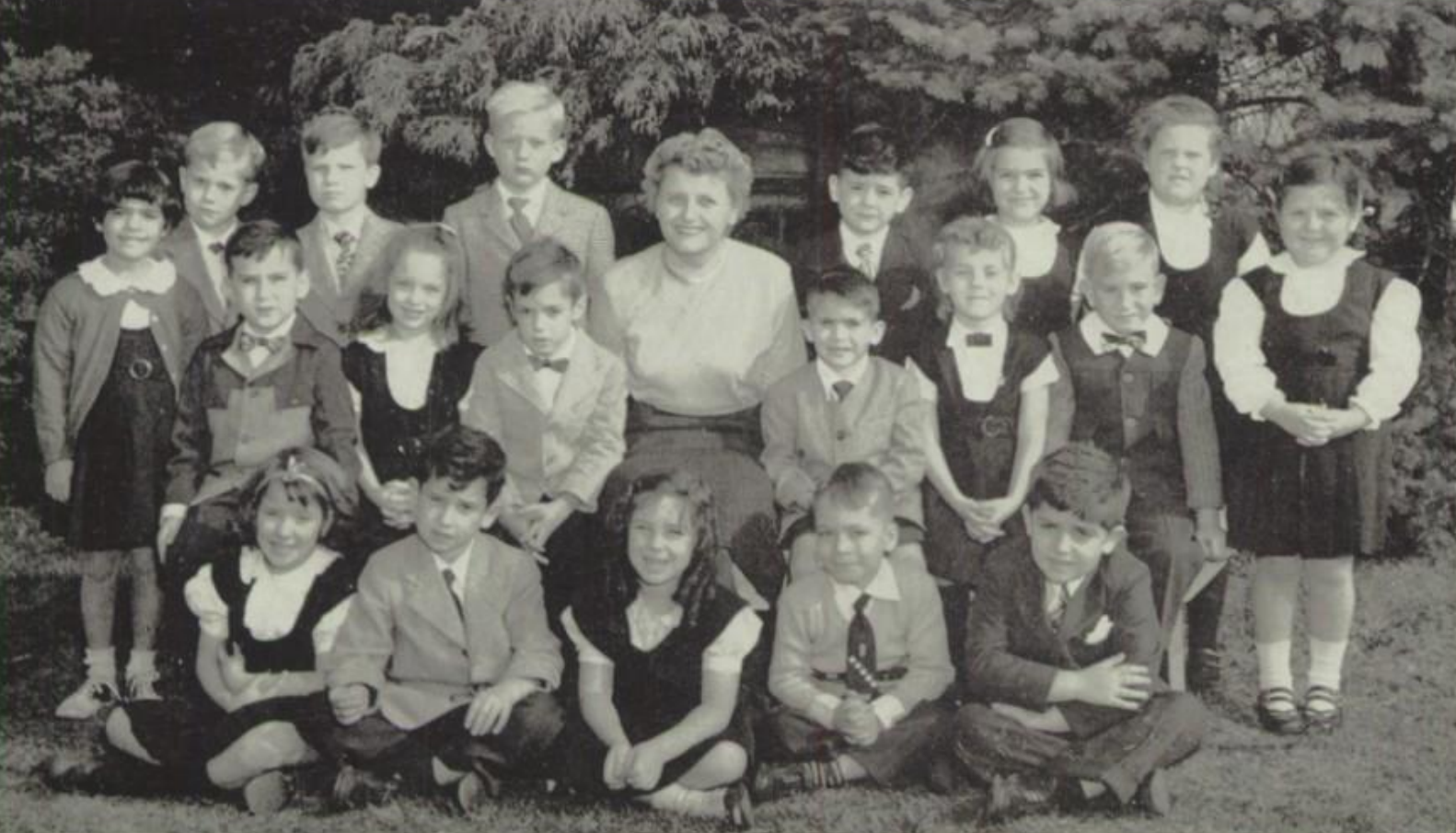
The Kew-Forest School first grade class in 1953 with Trump (back row, fourth from the left)

When he was three, Trump began attending the Carousel Pre-School, a nursery startup in Jamaica Estates, where the director remembered him as "attractive, social, and outgoing". At that age, he and his siblings were each earning US$200,000 a year through various Fred Trump tax-avoidance schemes, adjusted for inflation in 2018; he was a millionaire by eight. (Note: Beginning when Trump was three years old, his father gave each of his children $6,000 every year, the maximum allowed without incurring a gift tax. To avoid taxes, Fred made them landlords of two of his housing developments, paying each $13,928 in rent every year.) He developed an interest in toy construction equipment and blocks and was tenaciously rebellious; Trump and his mother later described an instance in which he took Robert's blocks to finish a large structure he was constructing and glued them together, preventing Robert from using his blocks. Trump enrolled at Kew-Forest, a private school in Forest Hills, Queens, when he was five. Fred was on Kew-Forest's board and had donated materials to construct a wing of the school. Kew-Forest, in contrast to the looser Carousel, was traditional and structured, enforcing a dress code. At Kew-Forest, Trump was disruptive and determined to cause mischief regardless of consequence. He later contended that he gave his music teacher a black eye in second grade, believing that, in his telling, the teacher was clueless about music. (Note: Trump later recounted the event in The Art of the Deal (1987).) In interviews conducted for Trump Revealed (2017), a close friend of Trump, Peter Brant, could not recall the incident occurring or Trump mentioning that it had happened. Detentions at Kew-Forest became known as "Donny Trumps" for Trump's notorious behavior. In contrast, some former classmates who spoke to Maggie Haberman for her book Confidence Man described Trump as "sweet and fun to be around".

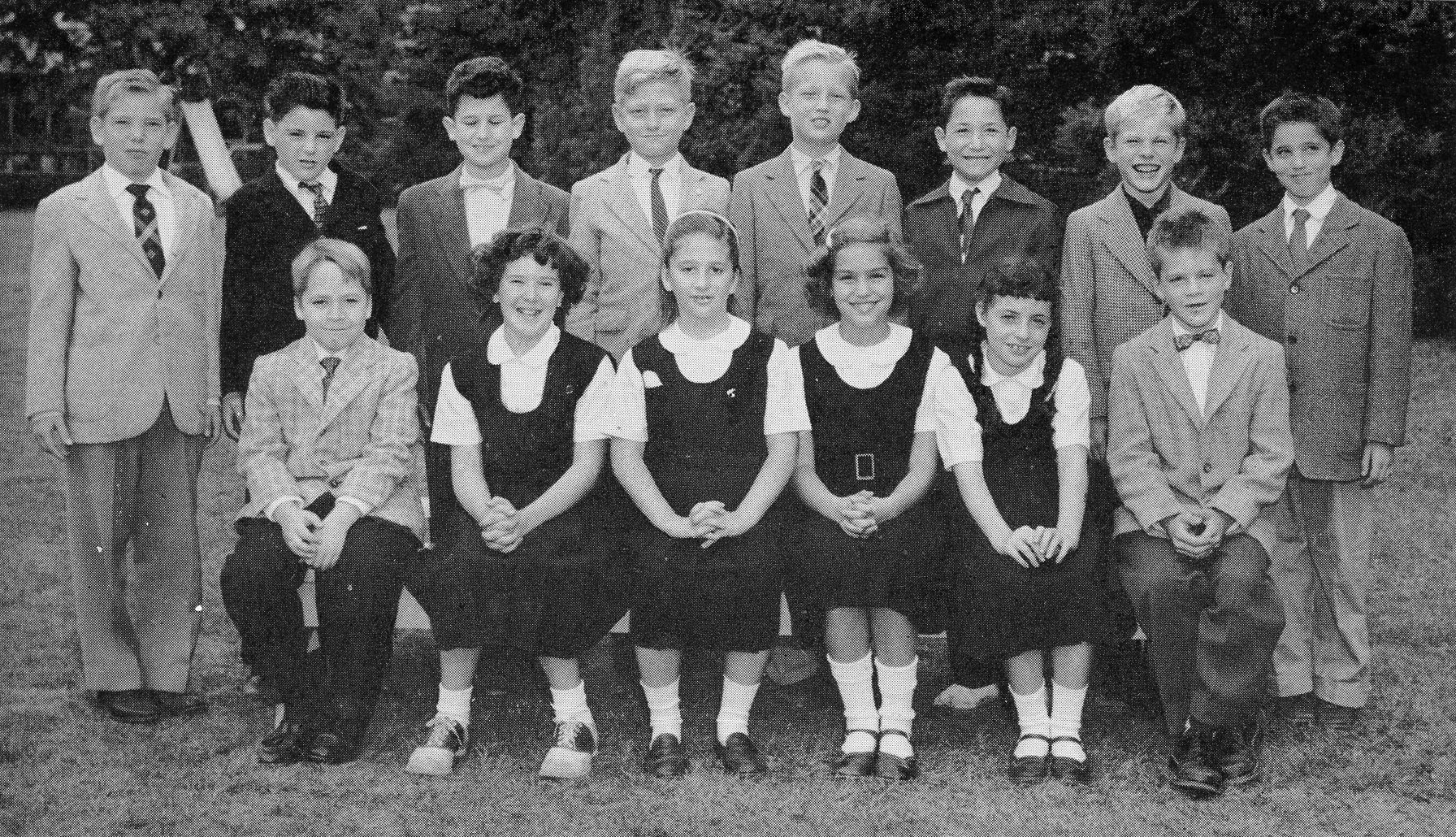
The Kew-Forest School sixth grade class in 1958 with Trump (back row, fourth from the right)

To discourage Trump from causing further mischief, his mother, a devout Christian, sent Trump to confirmation classes at First Presbyterian Church in Jamaica. Trump's behavior remained consistent at Sunday school and home, where he occasionally rebuffed his father. In fourth grade, he was the tallest in his class of sixteen, giving him an advantage in sports. Though Trump's grades suffered, he was adept at a variety of sports, including punchball, basketball, football, and soccer. Trump was particularly passionate about baseball, playing the position of catcher, and admired the catchers Yogi Berra of the New York Yankees and Roy Campanella of the Brooklyn Dodgers. On several occasions, he secretly brought a transistor radio into class and listened to baseball with earplugs. Trump had a paper route and rounded up bottles for deposits. With Brant, he would take the New York City Subway to Manhattan to purchase gag gifts—such as smoke bombs, and later switchblades—to play a game that involved throwing knives at a target. Their fascination with the blades developed after the premiere of West Side Story, a musical featuring street fighting, in 1957, when they were eleven.

== Military school ==
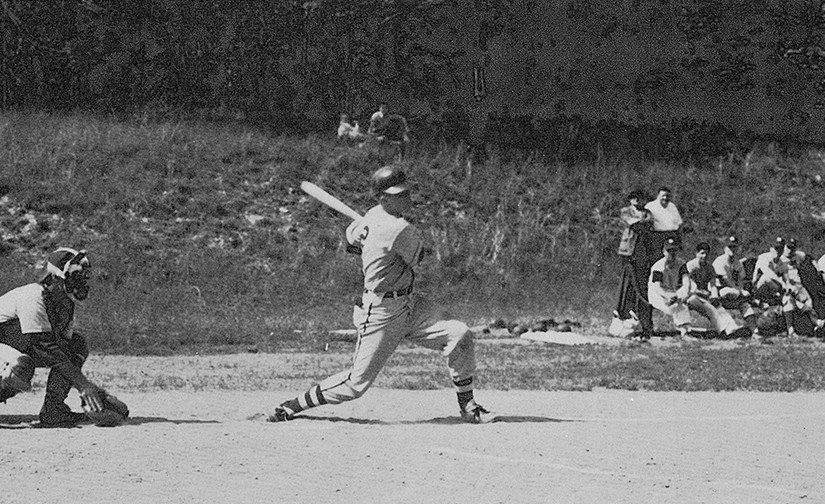
Trump playing baseball in 1962 (NYMA yearbook photo)

Near the end of Trump's seventh-grade year, his father, Fred, discovered his cache of knives and learned of his adventures in Manhattan. The revelations infuriated Fred, who decided to send Trump to New York Military Academy (NYMA) in Cornwall-on-Hudson, New York. Prior to attending the academy, Trump went to Camp Hilltop, an expensive, Christian, carefully-supervised outdoor camp in Hancock, as his brother, Freddy, had done years earlier—an experience that made him ornery and bored. He arrived at NYMA in September 1959, and was advised by Theodore Dobias, a World War II veteran. Dobias struck insubordinate cadets and conducted cage matches between disobedient students twice a week. Trump was physically abused with slaps and blows. Older cadets often used violence, or threats of violence, to assume authority. According to Dobias, Trump was reluctant to conform to the expectations of the academy, but he quickly excelled at hygiene requirements, sought to compete for contests in order and cleanliness, and worked for higher grades. Trump later described his tenure as contingent on "survival". In interviews, former cadets told Gwenda Blair for The Trumps (2000) that Trump was socially distant with everyone except for Dobias. Trump returned to Jamaica Estates each summer to help his father with apartment maintenance.

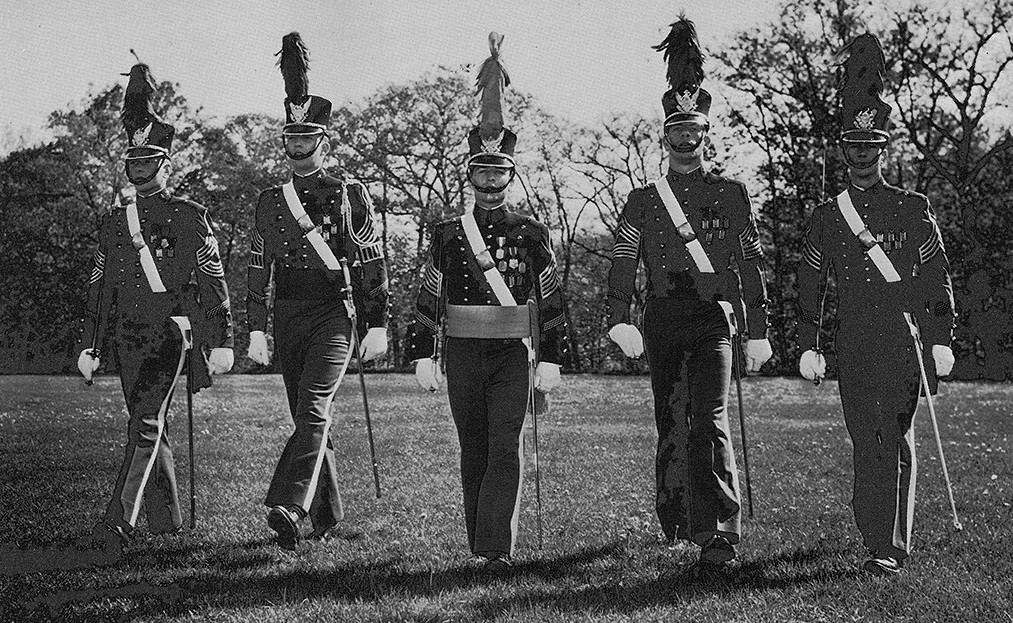
Trump (second from left) in 1964

Trump played sports at NYMA—one year each of varsity football and soccer, and three years of varsity baseball as a cleanup hitter and, during his senior year, as a first baseman. Dobias coached Trump in his time on the junior varsity baseball team, and he was informally named as an assistant coach and a co-captain in his senior year. Trump had a poor batting average of .056 in his final year, according to box scores. His later boasts notwithstanding, Trump was neither the best baseball player in New York, nor the academy's best athlete. Dobias later told Blair that Trump was "aggressive but so coachable"; in Trump's telling, he "finessed" Dobias by respecting him without becoming overcome with fear. Trump's decision to quit the football team his junior year, citing an apparently abusive coach, drew criticism from some other students. When a local newspaper headline said he helped to win a baseball game, Trump was amazed at seeing his name in print and marveled at his fame. Trump later misrepresented his high school athletic record, claiming falsely that he had been scouted by the major leagues.

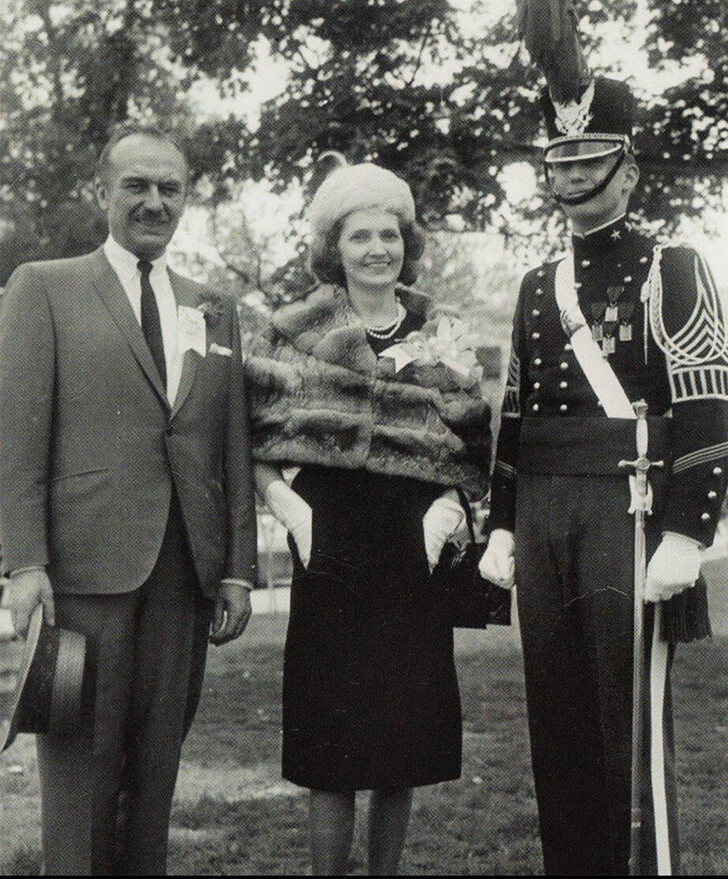
Trump and his parents at NYMA

In four out of the five years Trump attended NYMA, he made its honor roll, which required a grade average of eighty-five; in his sophomore year, he had a grade average of eighty. He was not in the highest ten percent of his class. He earned a class geometry medal for a perfect score. Trump, who started alongside other cadets as a private, became a corporal his sophomore year and a supply sergeant in Company E the following year. As a supply sergeant, Trump ordered a cadet to be struck with a broomstick for breaking formation. During an inspection, Trump found that a cadet, Ted Levine, had not made his bed. Trump took Levine's sheets and threw them on the floor; in response, Levine threw a combat boot at Trump and hit him. Trump then grabbed Levine and attempted to throw him out of a second-floor window, according to Levine. In Trump's senior year, he was promoted to captain of A Company. One month into Trump's tenure, a sergeant he commanded shoved a cadet into a wall for not reacting quickly enough. Amid other hazing controversies at NYMA, Trump was relieved of his position and reassigned as a battalion training officer.

As a senior, Trump was appointed to lead a special drill team for the Columbus Day Parade on Fifth Avenue. He became known for bringing beautiful women to the academy; Trump's senior-year yearbook identified him as class "ladies' man". By that year, Trump had become determined that he would assume control of Fred's business, the Fred Trump Organization. He graduated from NYMA in May 1964 with a B average; Trump's grades remained sealed after Michael Cohen, later his personal lawyer, told his high school, his colleges, and the College Board not to release his grades or SAT scores. Trump had earned only a few ordinary medals, so he borrowed 12 medals from a friend for his senior-year portrait. At the academy's graduation ceremony the following month, Trump received a single distinction: an honorary saber for serving as a captain. As the Vietnam War intensified, Trump was able to defer the draft by choosing to attend college. In the summer after graduation, Trump worked for Fred at the Swifton Village apartment complex in Cincinnati.

== University ==
=== Fordham University ===
After graduating from NYMA, Trump considered attending the University of Southern California's film school to study film, but chose to enroll at Fordham University, a private Jesuit research university in the Bronx, because it was nearer to his parents' home. His decision disappointed his father, Fred, who preferred that Trump attend the Wharton School of the University of Pennsylvania, an institution that his brother Freddy had likewise rejected. Trump's sister Maryanne privately said that she had helped get him into Fordham. Trump commuted from Jamaica Estates to Fordham's campus. As a freshman, Trump's wealth and military background put him at a distance from other students, as did his abstinence from smoking and drinking. He joined the school's squash team that year and sought to integrate himself into the culture. At Fordham, he studied economics. At the school, two friends introduced him to the game of golf, which he grew to love. On warmer days, he often skipped class to play golf.

Trump was recruited for the school's Division III football club as a punter but quit in about three or four weeks after he injured his ankle. He also participated in Fordham's tennis team. He worked on his father's Trump Village during school breaks. Trump did not take notes in class; he learned the material verbally from a study partner. He participated in Fordham's Reserve Officers' Training Corps program but withdrew his sophomore year as the Vietnam War escalated; cadets commit to being assigned as commissioned officers, assuring that they would be given a tour of duty in Vietnam. At universities, professors—wary of sending young men to war—often elevated their grades to ensure that they would pass. Trump was pressed to do well in his classes. He did not make the dean's list his freshman year.

=== University of Pennsylvania ===
During Trump's sophomore year, he told an NYMA alumnus that he intended to transfer to the Wharton School to "make better contacts for [his] future." Later, his brother Freddy asked a high-school friend who worked at the University of Pennsylvania admissions office to help get Trump admitted. At that time, Trump met the grade requirements, and the school was not yet very selective. Penn's prestige appealed to the Trumps. According to Michael D'Antonio in Never Enough (2015), Fred was insistent that his son graduate from an Ivy League institution, despite Trump's desires to forgo formal education. Trump was not a member of any club, sports team, or fraternity at Penn, and he was not photographed for his senior-year yearbook. He later claimed to be a top student—"first" in his Penn Wharton School class of 333—but actually did not even make the honor roll. Trump told Timothy L. O'Brien for TrumpNation that his performance at Wharton required that he "break out of that mold".

As opposition to United States involvement in the Vietnam War mounted on college campuses, Penn was largely distanced from activism. Though Trump personally opposed the war, he did not participate in protests. Trump graduated from the Wharton School in May 1968 with a Bachelor of Science degree in economics. His graduation made him eligible for the draft after education deferments for attending Fordham University and Penn. He visited a podiatrist who discovered that Trump had bone spurs in his heels—Trump could play sports but was disqualified from the military. The finding may have been supported by a second medical opinion. Two months after his medical deferment, in the Vietnam War draft lottery, which randomly ranked dates of birth for conscription, Trump's birthday happened to be drawn near the end of the list, receiving the high number 356 out of 366 and effectively sparing him from the mandatory draft.

== Works cited ==
- Barrett, Wayne (2016). Trump: The Greatest Show on Earth: The Deals, the Downfall, the Reinvention. New York: Regan Arts. ISBN 978-1-68245-079-6.
- Blair, Gwenda (2000). The Trumps: Three Generations That Built an Empire. New York: Simon & Schuster. ISBN 978-0-684-80849-9.
- Craig, Susanne; Buettner, Russ (2024). Lucky Loser: How Donald Trump Squandered His Father's Fortune and Created the Illusion of Success. New York: Penguin Random House. ISBN 978-0-593-29864-0.
- D'Antonio, Michael (2015). Never Enough: Donald Trump and the Pursuit of Success. New York: Thomas Dunne Books. ISBN 978-1-250-04238-5.
- Haberman, Maggie (2022). Confidence Man: The Making of Donald Trump and the Breaking of America. New York: Penguin Press. ISBN 978-90-295-4981-3.
- Hurt, Harry (1993). Lost Tycoon: The Many Lives of Donald J. Trump. New York: W. W. Norton & Company. ISBN 978-0-393-03029-7.
- Kranish, Michael; Fisher, Marc (2017). Trump Revealed: The Definitive Biography of the 45th President. New York: Simon & Schuster. ISBN 978-1-4711-5973-2.
- O'Brien, Timothy (2005). TrumpNation: The Art of Being the Donald. New York: Warner Books. ISBN 978-0-446-69683-8.
