= 2019 Pulitzer Prize =

Awards for journalism and related fields

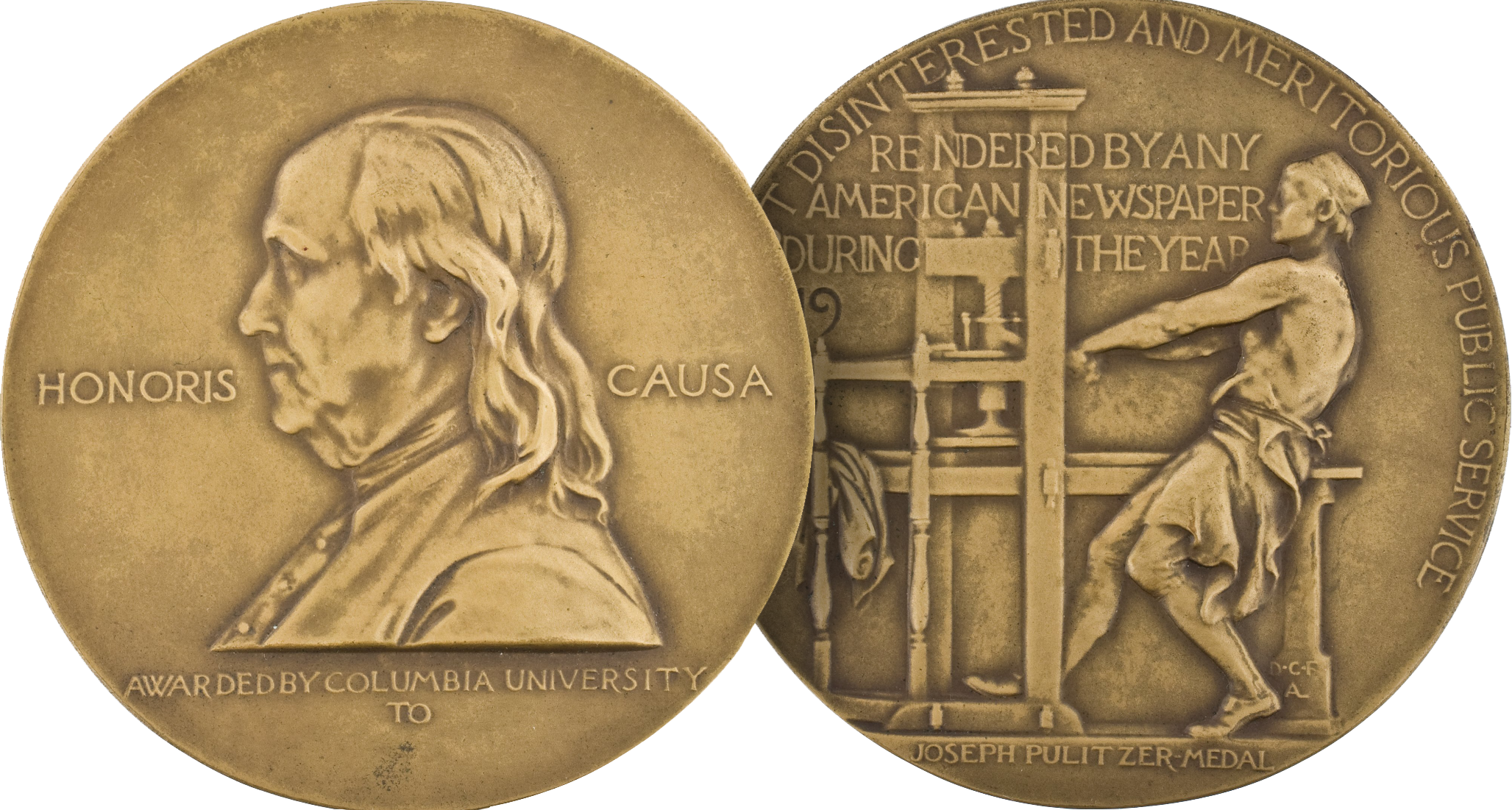
Pulitzer Prize medal

The 2019 Pulitzer Prizes were awarded by the Pulitzer Prize Board for work during the 2018 calendar year. Prize winners and nominated finalists were announced by administrator Dana Canedy at 3:00 p.m. EST on April 15, 2019.

The Washington Post won two prizes, as did The New York Times; The Wall Street Journal won one; and the Sun-Sentinel won its second Pulitzer for Public Service.

== Journalism ==
Public Service
The Sun-Sentinel, for "exposing failings by school and law enforcement officials before and after the deadly shooting rampage at Marjory Stoneman Douglas High School."
ProPublica, for "emotionally resonant reporting on migrant family separation at the U.S./Mexico border, including haunting audio of detained and distressed children desperate to reunite with their parents."
The Washington Post, for "commanding and courageous coverage of the murder of Saudi-born journalist and Washington Post contributor Jamal Khashoggi inside Saudi Arabia's Turkish consulate."

Breaking News Reporting
The Pittsburgh Post-Gazette staff, for "immersive, compassionate coverage of the massacre at Pittsburgh's Tree of Life synagogue that captured the anguish and resilience of a community thrust into grief."
Staff of the Chico Enterprise-Record in collaboration with the Bay Area News Group, for "committed coverage of an epic California wildfire that consumed more than 18,000 buildings in 150,000 acres, and took 86 lives. (Moved by the jury from Local Reporting, where it was originally entered.)"
Staff of the Sun-Sentinel, for "exhaustive and lucid multi-platform coverage of the Marjory Stoneman Douglas High School rampage that brought compassion and clarity to a horrific tragedy."

Investigative Reporting
Matt Hamilton, Harriet Ryan and Paul Pringle of the Los Angeles Times, for "consequential reporting on a University of Southern California gynecologist accused of violating hundreds of young women for more than a quarter-century."
David Barstow, Susanne Craig and Russ Buettner of The New York Times, for "an exhaustive 18-month investigation of President Donald Trump's finances that debunked his claims of self-made wealth and revealed a business empire riddled with tax dodges."
Kathleen McGrory and Neil Bedi of the Tampa Bay Times, for "impactful reporting, based on sophisticated data analysis, that revealed an alarming rate of patient fatalities following Johns Hopkins’ takeover of a pediatric heart treatment facility."

Explanatory Reporting
David Barstow, Susanne Craig and Russ Buettner of The New York Times, for "an exhaustive 18-month investigation of President Donald Trump's finances that debunked his claims of self-made wealth and revealed a business empire riddled with tax dodges."
Aaron Glantz and Emmanuel Martinez of Reveal from The Center for Investigative Reporting, (in collaboration with Associated Press, PRX and the PBS NewsHour), for "an exposé of redlining that analyzed more than 30 million mortgage records to uncover discrimination in the banking system, highlighting how skin color still shuts out millions of people from home ownership."
Kyra Gurney, Nicholas Nehamas, Jay Weaver and Jim Wyss of the Miami Herald, for "an ambitious explanation of a far-reaching criminal operation in which South American gold mining fueled international money laundering, urban street crime, environmental degradation, child exploitation, drug trafficking and a thriving precious metals industry in Miami."
Staff of The Washington Post, for "exhaustive data analysis and haunting storytelling that revealed the vast number of unsolved homicide cases in America's major cities."

Local Reporting
The Advocate staff, for "a damning portrayal of the state's discriminatory conviction system, including a Jim Crow-era law, that enabled Louisiana courts to send defendants to jail without jury consensus on the accused's guilt."
Barbara Laker, Wendy Ruderman, Dylan Purcell and Jessica Griffin of The Philadelphia Inquirer, for "dogged scientific investigation and evocative storytelling that exposed toxic dangers lurking in Philadelphia school buildings that sickened children in their classrooms."
Brandon Stahl, Jennifer Bjorhus, MaryJo Webster and Renée Jones Schneider of the Star Tribune, for "an illuminating and disturbing series that exposed breakdowns in Minnesota's investigation and prosecution of rape cases, and how such ineptitude fails victims of sexual assault."

National Reporting
Staff of The Wall Street Journal, for "uncovering President Trump's secret payoffs to two women during his campaign who claimed to have had affairs with him, and the web of supporters who facilitated the transactions, triggering criminal inquiries and calls for impeachment."
Staff of Associated Press, for "authoritative coverage of the Trump administration's migrant family separation policy that exposed a federal government overwhelmed by the logistics of caring for and tracking thousands of immigrant children."
Staff of The New York Times with contributions from Carole Cadwalladr of The Guardian/The Observer, for "reporting on how Facebook and other tech firms allowed the spread of misinformation and failed to protect consumer privacy, leading to Cambridge Analytica's theft of 50 million people's private information, data that was used to boost Donald Trump's campaign."

International Reporting
Maggie Michael, Maad al-Zikry and Nariman El-Mofty of The Associated Press, for "a revelatory yearlong series detailing the atrocities of the war in Yemen, including theft of food aid, deployment of child soldiers and torture of prisoners."
Staff of Reuters, with notable contributions from Wa Lone and Kyaw Soe Oo, for "expertly exposing the military units and Buddhist villagers responsible for the systematic expulsion and murder of Rohingya Muslims from Myanmar, courageous coverage that landed its reporters in prison."
Rukmini Callimachi of The New York Times, for "dissecting the power and persistence of the ISIS terror movement, through relentless on-the-ground and online reporting, and masterful use of podcast storytelling."

Feature Writing
Hannah Dreier of ProPublica, for "a series of powerful, intimate narratives that followed Salvadorian immigrants on New York's Long Island whose lives were shattered by a botched federal crackdown on the international criminal gang MS-13."
Deanna Pan and Jennifer Berry Hawes of The Post and Courier, for "a deeply moving examination of racial injustice in South Carolina that led to the execution of a 14-year-old black boy wrongfully convicted of killing two white girls, and that ultimately exonerated him seven decades after his death."
Elizabeth Bruenig of The Washington Post, for "eloquent reflections on the exile of a teen sexual assault victim in the author's West Texas hometown, delving with moral authority into why the crime remained unpunished."

Commentary
Tony Messenger of The St. Louis Post-Dispatch, for "bold columns that exposed the malfeasance and injustice of forcing poor rural Missourians charged with misdemeanor crimes to pay unaffordable fines or be sent to jail."
Caitlin Flanagan of The Atlantic, for "luminous columns that expertly explore the intersection of gender and politics with a personal, yet keenly analytical, point of view."
Melinda Henneberger of The Kansas City Star, for "examining, in spare and courageous writing, institutional sexism and misogyny within her hometown NFL team, her former governor's office and the Catholic Church."

Criticism
Carlos Lozada of The Washington Post, for "trenchant and searching reviews and essays that joined warm emotion and careful analysis in examining a broad range of books addressing government and the American experience."
Jill Lepore of The New Yorker, for "critical, yet restrained, explorations of incredibly varied subjects, from Frankenstein to Ruth Bader Ginsburg, that combined literary nuance with intellectual rigor."
Manohla Dargis of The New York Times, for "authoritative film criticism that considered the impact of movies both inside the theater and in the wider world with rare passion, craftsmanship and insight."

Editorial Writing
Brent Staples of The New York Times, for "editorials written with extraordinary moral clarity that charted the racial fault lines in the United States at a polarizing moment in the nation's history."
Editorial Staff of The Advocate, for "persuasive editorials that prompted Louisiana voters to abolish a Jim Crow-era law that undermined equal justice in the jury system."
Editorial Staff of the Capital Gazette, for "deeply personal editorials that reflected on gun violence, loss and recovery following a newsroom attack that left five of the writers’ colleagues dead."

Editorial Cartooning
Darrin Bell, a freelance cartoonist, for "beautiful and daring editorial cartoons that took on issues affecting disenfranchised communities, calling out lies, hypocrisy and fraud in the political turmoil surrounding the Trump administration."
Ken Fisher, drawing as Ruben Bolling, freelancer, for "pointed political commentary, informed by comics history, that provided readers nuanced satire of the Trump phenomenon."
Rob Rogers, freelancer, for "provocative illustrations that channeled cultural and historical references with expert artistry and an eye for hypocrisy and injustice."

Breaking News Photography
The photography staff of Reuters, for "a vivid and startling visual narrative of the urgency, desperation and sadness of migrants as they journeyed to the U.S. from Central and South America."
Noah Berger, John Locher and Ringo H. W. Chiu of Associated Press, for "devastating images that chronicled the historic 2018 fire season in California and captured the destruction from massive blazes as they spread at an extraordinary pace".
Photography Staff of Associated Press, for "searing images that chronicled clashes between Palestinians and Israelis in the Gaza Strip."

Feature Photography
Lorenzo Tugnoli of The Washington Post, for "brilliant photo storytelling of the tragic famine in Yemen, shown through images in which beauty and composure are intertwined with devastation. (Moved by the jury from Breaking News Photography, where it was originally entered.)"
Craig F. Walker of The Boston Globe, for "superb photography and sophisticated visual storytelling that brought understanding to the story of a young boy living with a complex developmental disability."
Maggie Steber and Lynn Johnson of National Geographic, for "a compelling, dignified photo narrative that provides an intimate look at the youngest face transplant recipient in the U.S."

== Letters, Drama, and Music ==
Fiction
The Overstory, by Richard Powers, an "ingeniously structured narrative that branches and canopies like the trees at the core of the story whose wonder and connectivity echo those of the humans living amongst them."
The Great Believers, by Rebecca Makkai, an "artful novel that chronicles a mother's search for her estranged daughter against the backdrop of the AIDS crisis, and contemplates the ripples of grief affecting generations of survivors."
There There, by Tommy Orange, a "compassionate debut that, through 12 Native American narrators making their way to a California powwow, offers a chorus of voices struggling with questions of identity and authenticity."

Drama
Fairview, by Jackie Sibblies Drury, a "hard-hitting drama that examines race in a highly conceptual, layered structure, ultimately bringing audiences into the actors’ community to face deep-seated prejudices."
Dance Nation, by Clare Barron, a "refreshingly unorthodox play that conveys the joy and abandon of dancing, while addressing the changes to body and mind of its preteen characters as they peer over the precipice toward adulthood."
What the Constitution Means to Me, by Heidi Schreck, a "charming and incisive analysis of gender and racial biases inherent to the U.S. Constitution that examines how this living document could evolve to fit modern America."

History
Frederick Douglass: Prophet of Freedom, by David W. Blight, a "breathtaking history that demonstrates the scope of Frederick Douglass’ influence through deep research on his writings, his intellectual evolution and his relationships."
American Eden: David Hosack, Botany, and Medicine in the Garden of the Early Republic, by Victoria Johnson, a "beautiful restoration of the world of botanist and surgeon Dr. David Hosack whose forward-looking views embodied early American ambitions in transatlantic scientific discourse."
Civilizing Torture: An American Tradition, by W. Fitzhugh Brundage, a "morally engaging investigation of torture that measures American ideals of democracy and equality against a dark, uncomfortable reality."

Biography or Autobiography
The New Negro: The Life of Alain Locke, by Jeffrey C. Stewart, a "panoramic view of the personal trials and artistic triumphs of the father of the Harlem Renaissance and the movement he inspired."
Proust's Duchess: How Three Celebrated Women Captured the Imagination of Fin-de-Siècle Paris, by Caroline Weber, a "revelatory work that speaks to the power and influence of three women at the highest levels of French society, whose lives intertwined in the imagination of novelist Marcel Proust."
The Road Not Taken: Edward Lansdale and the American Tragedy in Vietnam, by Max Boot, a "nuanced portrait of CIA operative and foreign policy expert Edward Lansdale that adroitly captures his complex character, misunderstood legacy and the contradictions of his times."

Poetry
Be With, by Forrest Gander, a "collection of elegies that grapple with sudden loss, and the difficulties of expressing grief and yearning for the departed."
feeld, by Jos Charles, a "volume of imaginative, idiosyncratic verse that merges contemporary speech with Middle English tradition to interpret the transgender experience."
Like, by A. E. Stallings, a "collection of inventive formal poetry that challenges, gives shape to, and delights in how the art form mimics and distorts the universalities of life."

General Nonfiction
Amity and Prosperity: One Family and the Fracturing of America, by Eliza Griswold, a "classic American story, grippingly told, of an Appalachian family struggling to retain its middle class status in the shadow of destruction wreaked by corporate oil fracking."
In a Day's Work: The Fight to End Sexual Violence Against America's Most Vulnerable Workers, by Bernice Yeung, an "unembellished series of case studies about sexual violence exacted on mostly immigrant women in America, many toiling in a shadow economy."
Rising: Dispatches from the New American Shore, by Elizabeth Rush, a "rigorously reported story about American vulnerability to rising seas, particularly disenfranchised people with limited access to the tools of rebuilding."

Music
Prism, by Ellen Reid, a "bold new operatic work that uses sophisticated vocal writing and striking instrumental timbres to confront difficult subject matter: the effects of sexual and emotional abuse. Libretto by Roxie Perkins."
Still, by James Romig, a "hypnotic solo-piano work comprised of 43 individual sections whose striking harmonic implications and subtly dramatic effects distill music to its barest essences."
Sustain, by Andrew Norman, an "absorbing orchestral work rich with mesmerizing textures and color, including washes of clustered string sounds and cascading winds, creating a virtual sound installation in which perceptions of time are suspended".

== Special citations ==
Two special citations were awarded in 2019, as follows:

Special Citations
Aretha Franklin, for "her indelible contribution to American music and culture for more than five decades."
Capital Gazette, "A special citation to honor the journalists, staff and editorial board of the Capital Gazette, Annapolis, Maryland, for their courageous response to the largest killing of journalists in U.S. history in their newsroom on June 28, 2018, and for demonstrating unflagging commitment to covering the news and serving their community at a time of unspeakable grief. The citation comes with a $100,000 bequest by the Pulitzer Board to be used to further the newspaper's journalistic mission."
