= Mary Trump =

Mary Trump may refer to:

- Mary Anne MacLeod Trump (1912–2000), mother of U.S. president Donald Trump
- Mary L. Trump (born 1965), psychologist and author; niece of Donald Trump

== See also ==
- Maryanne Trump Barry (1937–2023), American jurist; sister of Donald Trump
