= Harris Interactive =

Harris Interactive may refer to:

- Harris Insights & Analytics, the marketing research firm
- Harris Interactive College Football Poll, the American college football poll
