= The Trumps =

The Trumps may refer to:

- Trump family, the family of businessman and 45th and 47th president of the United States Donald Trump
- The Trumps: Three Generations That Built an Empire, a 2000 biography by Gwenda Blair about the Trump family

== See also ==
- Trump (disambiguation)
