= Will Johnson (executive) =

American business executive

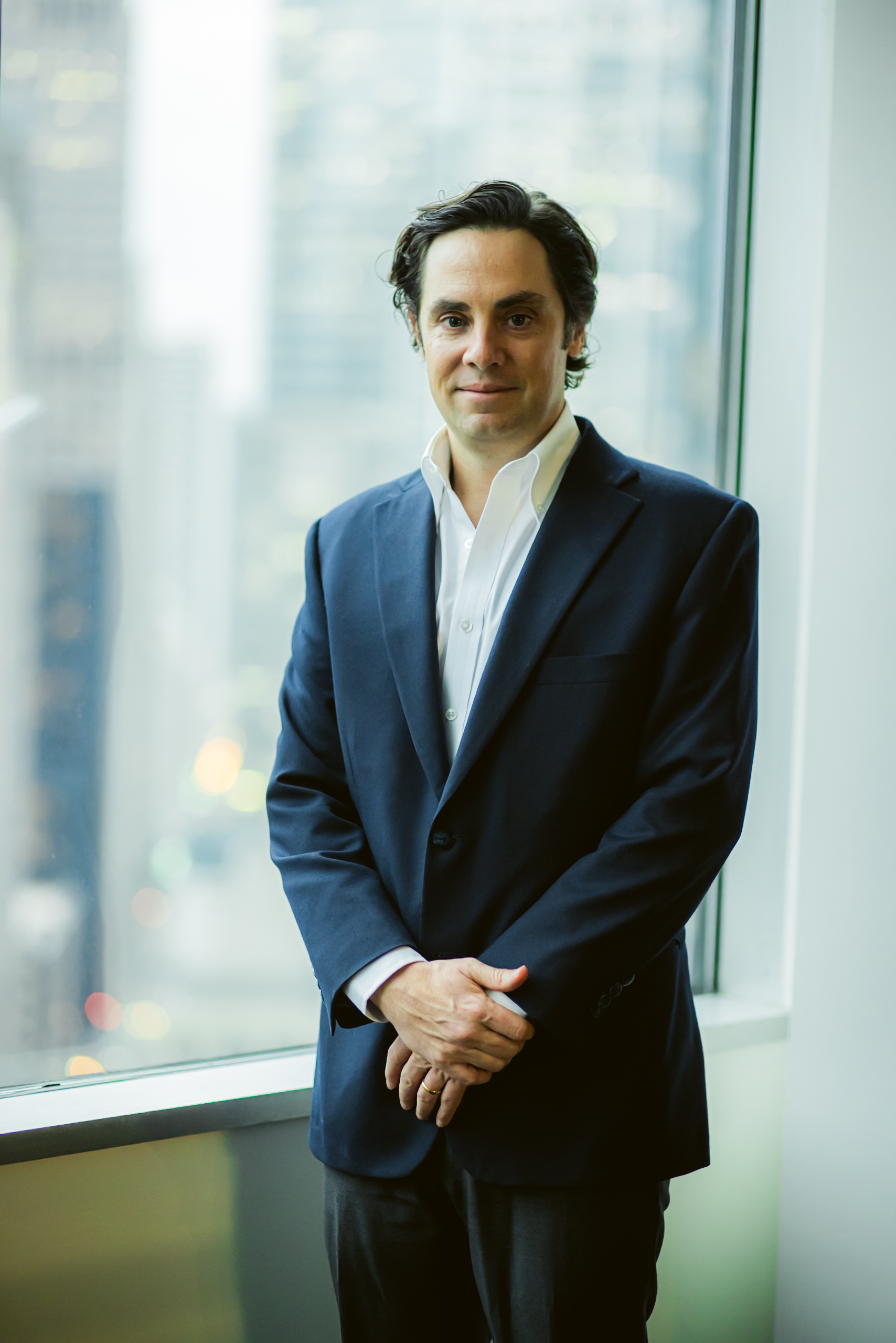
- Johnson in 2024
- Born: 1979 (age 46–47); Winnetka, Illinois, United States
- Education: Northwestern University, Lafayette College
- Occupation: former Chief executive officer
- Employer: The Harris Poll
- Children: 2

Will Johnson (born 1979) is an American business executive who is the former chief executive officer of The Harris Poll.

== Early life and education ==
Johnson was born in Winnetka, Illinois. He attended Crow Island School, where his first grade teacher noticed his reading and speaking abilities did not match, leading to him being diagnosed with dyslexia. He majored in government and law, graduating magna cum laude from Lafayette College in 2002. His honors thesis was about the political impact of Millennials. Johnson also earned a Master of Business Administration degree from Northwestern University in 2008.

== Career ==
Johnson worked for Young & Rubicam Group after earning his undergraduate degree. Following graduate school, he returned to the company as chief strategist for BrandAsset Valuator, a database of brand and consumer behavior. In 2015, he was promoted to president of BAV Consulting.

Johnson assumed the role of co-chief executive officer of The Harris Poll, alongside John Gerzema in 2017; prior to his departure in 2025, Johnson oversaw the human resources and business units, including a team of 200 pollsters. Johnson and Gerzema were recruited by The Harris Poll's parent company, Stagwell Group. Johnson worked to migrate clients from one-time research to ongoing consulting contracts, and reworked the company's surveys to focus on smartphone users. Johnson has been described as an optimist about the polling industry, noting that he believes pollsters need to improve their methodology and rebuild public trust.

Johnson has written for publications including The Boston Globe, the Chicago Tribune, and The Washington Post, and has been on the board of directors for Tutoring Chicago.

Will Johnson (left), CEO of The Harris Poll, speaks at The Economic Club of Chicago.

== Personal life ==
As of 2024, Johnson lived in Chicago with his wife and two children. He is a member of the Young Presidents' Organization and the Economic Club of Chicago.
