= Lucky Loser =

Lucky Loser may refer to:

- Lucky loser, a sports competitor who loses a match, but who then re-enters the competition
- Lucky Loser (1934 film), a British comedy film
- Lucky Loser (2006 film), a Thai sports-comedy film
- Lucky Loser (book), a book subtitled "How Donald Trump Squandered his Father's Fortune and Created the Illusion of Success"

== See also ==
- Lucky Losers, a 1950 comedy film starring The Bowery Boys
