= Trump Unauthorized =

- Genre: Biographical drama
- Based on: The Trumps: Three Generations That Built an Empire and Donald Trump: Master Apprentice by Gwenda Blair
- Teleplay by: Keith Curran
- Directed by: John David Coles
- Starring: Justin Louis; Saul Rubinek; Chris Potter; Ron McLarty; Katheryn Winnick
- Music by: Anton Sanko
- Country of origin: United States
- Original language: English

Production
- Executive producers: Vin Di Bona; Daniel Lux; Barbara Lieberman
- Producers: Jörg Westerkamp; Thomas Becker; Michael Hagemeyer; Mark Winemaker
- Production location: Toronto
- Cinematography: Walt Lloyd
- Editor: Ralph Brunjes
- Running time: 120 minutes
- Production companies: Barbara Lieberman Productions; D. Lux – Di Bona Productions; Apollo ProMovie

Original release
- Network: ABC
- Release: May 24, 2005

Trump Unauthorized (also known as Ambition: The Donald Trump Story) is a 2005 American biographical drama television film about businessman Donald Trump. The film was directed by John David Coles and written by Keith Curran and stars Justin Louis as Trump. The film chronicles Trump's life, including his career and his marriages to Ivana Trump and Marla Maples. Trump Unauthorized is based on multiple sources, including two biographies by Gwenda Blair, The Trumps: Three Generations That Built an Empire and Donald Trump: Master Apprentice.

The film premiered on ABC on May 24, 2005. It received mostly negative reviews, although Louis' performance was praised by some critics and by Donald Trump, who was not involved with the film but called it a "great compliment" despite some inaccuracies. Several reviewers criticized the accent used by Katheryn Winnick for her role as Ivana Trump.

== Plot ==
Real estate developer Fred Trump is speaking with an associate on a telephone, while his son, Donald, is stacking building blocks on a window sill that overlooks the Manhattan skyline. As a young man, Donald goes against his father's advice and leaves his hometown to start his own real estate career in Manhattan, despite an ongoing recession. Donald plans to redevelop the Penn Central railyard into a convention center, but property owner Joseph Eichler is not convinced that Donald can complete such a large project, particularly without the support of New York City mayor Abraham Beame. Donald gains the support of Mayor Beame, but is unsuccessful in finding financiers for the project. Donald then hires lawyer Peter Wennik to advise him. Donald meets Ivana Zelníčková and the two get married, despite her initial reluctance to sign a prenuptial agreement. Despite Peter's advice, Donald purchases the aging Commodore Hotel with plans to renovate it, so he can attract financiers for larger projects in the future. Fred criticizes Donald's decision to put Ivana in charge of the hotel interior design, as she is not a professional designer.

After the hotel's opening, Donald plans to build Trump Tower in Manhattan, despite his father's advice that developers never name buildings after themselves. Donald purchases the Bonwit Teller building so he can demolish it to build Trump Tower. However, Donald must also convince the owner of an adjacent Tiffany store to sell him the air rights in order to build the project as envisioned. Donald has architect Der Scutt create two designs for the Trump Tower: an attractive design, and an unflattering design that Donald threatens to approve if the air rights are not sold to him. Donald is allowed to purchase the air rights, and construction begins on Trump Tower. Donald is upset when Trump Tower's height is reduced to 58 stories, although he decides to continue referring to it as a 68-story building, believing that the floor numbers do not have to be in sequential order. Fred Trump Jr., Donald's brother who suffers from alcoholism, dies of a massive heart attack. Trump Tower opens two years later, but Donald is still depressed about his brother's death and that he is not alive to see the grand opening.

Donald decides to pursue business in Atlantic City, where he plans to open the Trump Plaza Hotel and Casino. Donald hires his brother, Robert, to oversee his casino plans. Donald and Robert convince Harrah's to become a partner in the project after arranging for construction vehicles to work on the site, to give the impression that construction is already underway despite not being scheduled to start for another six months. When Donald realizes that the world's tallest building is not located in New York, he announces plans to have such a building constructed on the Penn Central site, as part of a project called Television City. However, Donald's plans are rejected by New York City mayor Ed Koch. Donald learns of the city's failed renovation attempts for the Wollman Rink and subsequently finishes the project, but Koch still will not allow construction of the Television City tower.

To promote his new book, The Art of the Deal, Donald suggests in an interview that he may become a candidate in the 1988 U.S. presidential election. At a book signing, Donald meets Marla Maples and the two begin a secretive relationship that is eventually reported in newspapers. Peter is later killed in a helicopter crash. For additional publicity, Donald tells a reporter that he had also been scheduled to fly on that helicopter. During a vacation in Aspen, Ivana discovers that Marla is also there and the two engage in a verbal fight that creates additional headlines. Donald eventually brings Marla as his date to the grand opening of the Trump Taj Mahal resort in Atlantic City, a project that Robert had warned against. On opening night, difficulties arise when half of the slot machines are shut down; as a result, Robert decides to quit overseeing Donald's casino projects. With $2 billion in debt, Donald faces the possibility of bankruptcy. Donald convinces financial officials to lend him more money to maintain the popularity of his brand name so he can eventually pay off the debt. Years later, Donald has recovered from his financial problems and meets a television producer who pitches an untitled reality series that would star Donald and would involve him firing people. Donald initially is reluctant, stating that he does not like to fire people because it makes him uncomfortable; however, the producer tells him that the firings would not be real.

== Cast ==
- Justin Louis as Donald Trump
  - Caleb Repchuk as Young Donald Trump
- Saul Rubinek as Peter Wennik
- Chris Potter as Fred Trump Jr.
- Ron McLarty as Fred Trump
- David Lipper as Robert Trump
- Richard Portnow as Ed Koch
- Jennifer Baxter as Marla Maples
- Peter MacNeill as Joseph Eichler
- Katheryn Winnick as Ivana Trump
- Peter Cockett as TV Producer
- Richard McMillan as Der Scutt
- Martin Doyle as Abraham Beame

== Production ==
In February 2005, American Broadcasting Company (ABC) announced plans for a then-untitled two-hour biographical television film about businessman Donald Trump that would chronicle the past 25 years of his business career and personal life. John David Coles, who had previously directed episodes of Desperate Housewives, was announced as the film's director. Keith Curran was announced as writer for the film, which would be an adaptation of Gwenda Blair's biographical book, The Trumps: Three Generations That Built an Empire. The film was also based on Blair's other biographical book, Donald Trump: Master Apprentice, as well as other sources. Robert Greenwald and Barbara Lieberman were to serve as executive producers.

Donald Trump, who starred in NBC's reality television series The Apprentice at the time, said he was surprised that NBC had not already made a television film based on his life. Trump further stated that he was flattered by ABC's new film and that he wanted it to be accurate. Trump also said that he was a "ratings machine" and, "They know that, and they're taking advantage of that." Speaking about the eventual actor who would portray him, Trump said he did not care if the actor could act or not, "As long as he's great-looking."

Casting was underway in February 2005, with production potentially commencing in March 2005. An air date had not been set at that time. Katheryn Winnick was cast as Ivana Trump in late February 2005. Quinn Taylor, a senior vice president for ABC, said, "Donald Trump is the American version of royalty. He's probably one of the most fascinating and intriguing men certainly of my generation who has continually kept himself at the top of his game. That he was able to do it is worth exploring. Casting will be challenging because it's somebody that everybody thinks they know, so we'll have to do a big search to find a person who can pull it off. We're just looking for the best actor we can find."

On March 17, 2005, it was announced that Justin Louis would portray Trump in the film, which was titled Ambition at that time. Lieberman said about Louis' casting: "I will tell you, we are blessed. Donald Trump had the most gorgeous hair as a young man. He had beautiful, beautiful hair. Certainly before we cast the role, we thought we would have to use a wig. ... We cast an actor with tons of hair, and we just have to style it." Also announced for the cast was Jennifer Baxter as Trump's second wife Marla Maples; and Ron McLarty as Trump's father Fred Trump. Production was to begin the following week, with the film expected to be broadcast on ABC later that year.

Filming took place in the Canadian city of Toronto. Scenes were also shot at Parkwood Estate in Oshawa. The film's production companies were Apollo ProMovie GMGH & Co. Filmproduktion KG, Barbara Lieberman Productions, and D. Lux – Di Bona Productions. A week before its broadcast, Trump said he would sue if the film contained inaccuracies.

== Broadcast ==
Trump Unauthorized premiered on ABC on the night of May 24, 2005. The film received minimal viewership at approximately 5.6 million viewers, which was ABC's lowest Tuesday numbers of the season. The film also aired on Canadian channels affiliated with CHUM Limited.

== Reception ==
Linda Stasi of the New York Post called the film a "horrible, laugh-out-loud TV movie that's supposed to depict the life of The Donald, but ends up off-point, clueless, dull as dirt and as amateurish as a high-school play." Stasi commented on Trump's threat of suing: "Nice thought, but impossible because how can you sue someone's ass off if they're down on the ground kissing yours?" Stasi wrote that the film "may well stand as one of the worst TV movies ever made. Yes, it's that terrible." Stasi praised Louis' performance as "the only good thing" about the film, and criticized Katheryn Winnick, "who looks nothing like Ivana and sounds nothing like, well, anyone who's ever lived. Her fake accent is so bad, she comes across as Dracula in drag." Stasi, who knew both of Trump's ex-wives, said that they were not accurately portrayed in the film: "Ivana may be driven, but she's not a nightmare. And Marla may have been the mistress, but she's far from an airhead." Stasi concluded, "How does something this bad get made? [...] The Donald should go to court tomorrow and try to get an injunction to stop it from airing – just to save unsuspecting viewers from being exposed to such hazardous waste materials."

Kevin Crust of the Los Angeles Times said the film's "blend of comedy and faux Shakespearean tragedy goes down easily enough, but it doesn't really give us anything we don't already know about the man who names his luxury hotels after himself." Crust called Louis' performance "spot-on", and noted that the accent used by Winnick "seems to fall somewhere between the wild and crazy Festrunk brothers of early Saturday Night Live fame and the Gabor sisters". Crust also wrote that Maples, as portrayed in the film, "radiates the intelligence of a burnt-out light bulb", and concluded that the film "lacks the audacity to risk being the all-out comedy the material demands. It has the uneasy flow of a heavily abridged audio-book." Alessandra Stanley of The New York Times wrote that Louis "perfectly captures Mr. Trump's Queens accent and hyperbolic speech, though his hair stylists did not do full justice to the baroque architecture of the real estate mogul's coiffe." Stanley felt that the film's title was misleading: "Even though his reality show, The Apprentice, is on NBC, a rival network, ABC portrays Mr. Trump as a pleasant egomaniac and likeable liar who is nonetheless true to his word in the end."

Brian Lowry of Variety wrote that the film "fails to get under that famous mop and expose what makes Trump tick – perhaps because there's limited evidence of depth beyond the bluster. Fun in a campy way, the telefilm has its moments, but it won't inspire many to say, 'You're TiVo-ed!'" Lowry wrote that Louis "captures the swagger and tenor of Trump's voice, but Keith Curran's script – derived from two Trump tomes by Gwenda Blair – doesn't penetrate the cartoonish surface that has made 'The Donald' the personification of self-promotion. The only real insight, in fact, is that the young Trump suffered from what might be called 'daddy issues' in his quest to shake up New York real estate". Lowry also criticized the accent used by Winnick, and wrote that the relationship between Donald and Ivana Trump "unfolds like a series of postcards, with about as much context. The only revealing sequences come when the couple negotiates a prenuptial agreement as a kind of foreplay, before eventually breaking up via a series of exchanges in Liz Smith's column. Similarly, Jennifer Baxter's late-arriving Marla Maples is presented as the quintessential airhead". Lowry wrote that the film was "generally sympathetic toward Trump", and concluded, "What might initially have appeared like an attempt to embarrass a rival network's star proves little more than a sweeps stunt leveraging Trump's notoriety, without delivering any greater illumination of his gift for B.S. than one of The Apprentice's weekly boardroom sessions. As a biography of a guy convinced there's no such thing as bad publicity, there's nothing here that Trump wouldn't have authorized, notarized and no doubt hyperbolized."

Sid Smith of the Chicago Tribune praised the performances of McLarty, Baxter, and Chris Potter, and wrote that Louis "looks more like actor Owen Wilson and, try as his stylists might, he doesn't really duplicate that inimitable, iconic hairdo. But he sounds like Trump, and he is an effective, serviceable stand-in". Smith felt that Winnick was "an overly accented caricature as Ivana, whose treatment is demeaning to her and women in general". Smith wrote that the film "plays for laughs and as a speedy trip through tabloid memory," and concluded that "strange as it sounds, it actually succeeds in earning the guy a smidgen of sympathy." Reviewers for People wrote that Louis "doesn't bear much resemblance" to Trump, and that "after we see the mogul shed a tear over press reports of his massive debt, the filmmakers basically skip the '90s, omitting the details of what he later calls the 'single greatest corporate comeback in U.S. history.' If it was that great, tell us more." John Leonard of New York magazine wrote that the film contained no "surprises" and that Louis "has a lean and hungry look that's altogether missing from the man he impersonates". Gail Pennington of the St. Louis Post-Dispatch wrote that Trump Unauthorized "turns out to be a lively and amusing movie", stating that it "is certainly entertaining" and "full of snappy lines." Pennington noted that Louis "looks nothing at all" like Trump, but wrote that he did a "dead-on" impersonation of Trump's voice.

David Bianculli of the New York Daily News wrote that the film "has no characters. There are only caricatures, running from one well-established plot point, building or woman to another without once stopping to flesh out anything." Bianculli wrote, "Lewis' makeup artists don't get the hair right, but clearly almost all of the budget went for outfits worn by Katheryn Winnick as Trump's first wife, Ivana. Clearly, no money was left over for a dialect coach [...]. Lewis, meanwhile, gets Trump's posture right, but that's about it. The dialogue, when trying to present something other than exposition, is laughable." Bianculli also criticized the film for excluding references to Trump's wealthy lifestyle, stating that much of it is kept "off screen and out of the budget. This TV Trump may grouse about having to cut costs by selling his yacht – but this telemovie never even shows the boat." Bianculli also criticized the film's "laughable climax" in which Trump meets with a reality television producer to discuss a new show: "We know it's The Apprentice, just as we know the producer is Mark Burnett – but neither is identified. The movie just ends, having filled the requisite two hours to sell enough sweeps-month ads and lure enough curious viewers." Bianculli wrote that the film "doesn't go after Donald Trump, but doesn't get under his skin, either," and concluded, "Neither classy nor trashy, this unauthorized biography is something you can seldom say of its subject: It's dull."

=== Reaction from the Trumps ===
Donald Trump said that, overall, he was flattered by the film, which he considered to be a cross between Desperate Housewives and Dynasty. Trump considered the film a "great compliment", and said, "Having a two-hour movie on network television while you're still living is sort of wild. You're supposed to be gone for that to happen." Trump also praised Louis' performance: "I think he did a very excellent job. I just really wish he were my height." However, Trump stated that some parts of the film were "totally wrong" – including the character of Peter Wennik, who never existed – although he said he would not sue the filmmakers. Trump's third wife, Melania Trump, who was not portrayed in the film, said, "I think it was fun to watch, but it was nothing new. His life is an open book and there were no surprises."
