= Louis Harris =

American journalist (1921–2016)

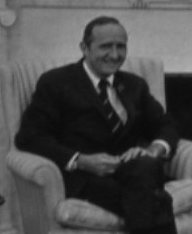
- Harris in the White House in 1971
- Born: January 6, 1921; New Haven, Connecticut, US
- Died: December 17, 2016 (aged 95); Key West, Florida, US
- Education: University of North Carolina at Chapel Hill
- Occupations: Public opinion analyst, journalist, author
- Years active: 1946–2016
- Known for: The Harris Poll
- Spouse: Florence Yard
- Children: Peter, Richard and Susan Yard Harris

Louis Harris (January 6, 1921 – December 17, 2016) was an American opinion polling entrepreneur, journalist, and author. He ran one of the best-known polling organizations of his time, Louis Harris and Associates, which conducted The Harris Poll. He followed Elmo Roper and George Gallup in using and improving the art and the techniques of opinion polling.

== Early life ==
Harris was born on January 6, 1921, in New Haven, one of three children of Harry Harris, a real estate developer, and the former Frances Smith. He was raised in New Haven, Connecticut. He attended New Haven High School and the University of North Carolina at Chapel Hill, where he graduated in 1942. He then joined the Navy, as World War II was underway.

== Career ==
Harris began working in the field of public opinion and marketing research in 1947, when he joined the Elmo Roper firm as Roper's assistant. In 1956 Harris left Roper's business and started his own firm, Louis Harris and Associates, Inc.

The Harris firm conducted polling for political candidates. In 1960 Harris became the first presidential pollster, working for the campaign of John F. Kennedy, who was elected U.S. President that year. Kennedy had initially hired Harris in 1958 for assistance with his campaign for re-election to the US Senate; following that re-election, Harris persuaded Kennedy to run for the presidency, and had much advice on how to achieve that goal, using his opinion polling techniques.

In 1962, Harris devised a new analysis technique for CBS News to enable the television network to predict the outcome of an election based on computer analysis of voting results from a small number of "key precincts." It was felt that predicting the election on television before polling was ended across the US was a negative action, as West Coast voters felt this lessened the importance of their votes. The practice was then discontinued.

Harris wrote columns that appeared in several print media, and then on television. From 1963 to 1968, his columns appeared in The Washington Post and in Newsweek. Then from 1969 to 1988, his columns were written for The Chicago Tribune-New York Daily News Syndicate, appearing in over 100 newspapers. He wrote for Time Magazine from 1969 to 1972, and later gave his commentaries on CBS and ABC News.

In January 1992 at age 70, Lou Harris retired from Louis Harris & Associates, which was owned by Gannett in that year, and formed his second company, LH Associates.

Harris's firm was bought by Donaldson, Lufkin & Jenrette in 1969, and then by Gannett in 1975, with Louis Harris continuing as chief executive until he retired in 1992. In 1996, the Gannett Corporation sold Louis Harris & Associates to the Gordon S. Black Corporation, which operated under the name Harris Black International before becoming a publicly traded company, Harris Interactive, in December 1999. In February 2014, The Harris Poll was acquired by Nielsen.

== Legacy ==
In 2017, The Harris Poll was acquired by the Stagwell Group, which took the company private and renamed the polling firm as Harris Insights & Analytics. The continuous polling of American opinion is now found at this online site.

His papers, Louis Harris papers, 1940-1990s, are held in the Southern Historical Collection, University of North Carolina at Chapel Hill (#4662).

== Bibliography ==
This is an abbreviated list of his publications.

- Is There a Republican Majority? (1954)
- The Negro Revolution in America (1964, with William Brink, republished in 1997) Simon & Schuster, ISBN 9780671204198
- Black and White (1967)
- Black-Jewish Relations in New York City: The Anguish of Change (1970 with Bert E. Swanson), Praeger Publishers, ISBN 9780275280390
- Redesigning America's schools: The Public Speaks: report of a survey (1986), The Forum, ISBN 9780961668518
- Inside America (1987), Vintage Books, ISBN 9780394750705

== Personal life ==
In 1943, Louis Harris married Florence Yard. They had three children, Peter, Richard and Susan Yard Harris. His wife died in 2004. At the time of his death he had four grandchildren. Harris died on December 17, 2016, at his home in Key West, Florida.
