= Never Enough: Donald Trump and the Pursuit of Success =

2015 biography of Michael D'Antonio

- Author: Michael D'Antonio
- Language: English
- Subject: Donald Trump
- Publisher: Thomas Dunne Books, St. Martin's Press
- Publication date: September 22, 2015
- Publication place: United States
- Media type: Print
- Pages: 389
- ISBN: 978-1-250-04238-5 (Hardcover)

Never Enough: Donald Trump and the Pursuit of Success (published in paperback as The Truth About Trump) is a 2015 biography of Donald Trump by Michael D'Antonio. The book includes interviews with Trump, his son Donald Trump Jr., first wife Ivana Trump, second wife Marla Maples, and Theodore Dobias, Trump's coach and drill sergeant at New York Military Academy, which he attended as a teenager.

== Background ==
Prior to the announcement of Trump's 2016 presidential campaign, he met with author Michael D'Antonio and writer Mark Dagostino. Trump told D'Antonio, during the initial meeting, that he was prepared to decline D'Antonio's request for several formal interviews. Trump told D'Antonio that he agreed to their meeting only because D'Antonio was being assisted by Dagostino, who was helping him with research for the book. Dagostino, whom Trump liked, had previously reported on Trump in People. During the meeting, Trump agreed to do half a dozen interviews. Trump told D'Antonio, "It'll probably be a bad book and I'll regret doing it. But, OK, I could sue you if it's bad, but I won't bother because the book won't sell. People want positive, inspiring. That's what you should write if you want a success."

Rhona Graff, Trump's chief assistant, arranged for D'Antonio and Dagostino to meet with people who knew and liked Trump. After interviewing Trump's second wife, Marla Maples, Graff halted all future interviewing sessions. D'Antonio said the reason was because "I had spoken to someone on the Trump list of enemies, the writer Harry Hurt, who had offended Trump way back in 1993. I had mentioned to Marla Maples that I had spoken to him. It seemed she had then shared this fact with her ex." Up to that time, Trump had provided more than 10 hours of interviews for D'Antonio.

== Publication ==
Never Enough was initially scheduled for release in January 2016. In August 2015, publisher Thomas Dunne Books announced that the book would instead be released on October 6, 2015, and later, as Trump was leading in the 2016 presidential polls, the release date was moved up to September 22, 2015.

The book was published in paperback in June 2016 by St. Martin's Press, under the name The Truth About Trump.

== Reception ==
James B. Stewart of The New York Times called the book "an admirably straightforward, evenhanded but nonetheless damning account of Trump's life." Carlos Lozada of The Washington Post wrote that "You can tell" the book "was rushed", stating that "stray words and occasional typos pop up just often enough to be distracting — but it is still a brisk and entertaining read".

Edward Luce of Financial Times called the book, "Balanced, well-sourced and perfectly timed," being released midway between the launch of Trump's presidential campaign and the start of the 2016 Republican primaries. Luce wrote that the book was not a "quick read," but that it "is worth the time." Susan Page of USA Today gave the book three and a half stars out of four, and also believed that it was released at an opportune time. Page called the book "a carefully reported and fair-minded account" of Trump's life.
