= Lucky Loser (book) =

2024 book about Donald J. Trump by Russ Buettner and Susanne Craig

- Cover page
- Author: Susanne Craig and Russ Buettner
- Language: English
- Subject: Donald Trump, his wealth, and his family
- Published: September 17, 2024
- Publisher: Penguin Random House LLC
- Publication place: United States
- Pages: 528
- ISBN: 9780593298640
- OCLC: 1423685554

Lucky Loser: How Donald Trump Squandered His Father's Fortune and Created The Illusion of Success is a nonfiction book written by New York Times investigative journalists Susanne Craig and Russ Buettner and published on September 17, 2024 by Penguin Random House LLC. It covers Donald Trump's inherited wealth, financial and business practices, with insights into his claims on being a self-made man.

The book delves into how Trump's father Fred Trump's wealth and fortune was used as a financial leverage for his son. It challenges the long-standing narrative that Trump built his empire from a modest loan, instead saying that he inherited the equivalent of over $400 million from his father. Craig and Buettner say that Trump, despite receiving substantial financial backing, repeatedly lost money on ventures, only to be bailed out by luck or the efforts of others. He was able to use the television show The Apprentice to rebrand himself during financially difficult times, ultimately leading to his political ascent.

In September 2025, Trump sued Penguin Random House and the New York Times for $15 billion in damages, alleging that the book is defamatory.

== Background ==
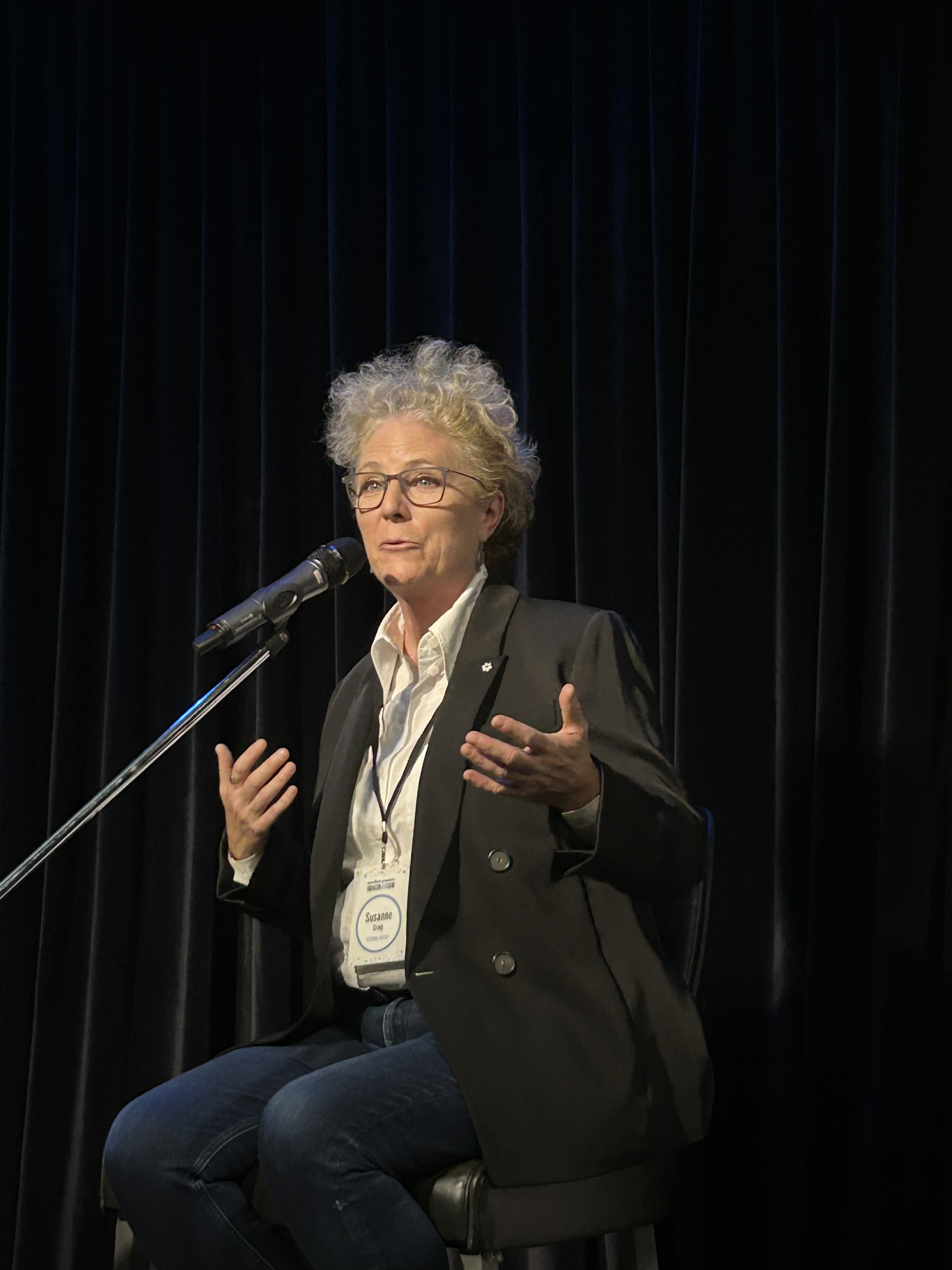
Susanne Craig speaking about her book at an event in Calgary, Alberta

On October 1, 2016, The New York Times published an article co-authored by Craig, which stated that Donald Trump had reported a loss of $916 million in 1995, which could have allowed him to avoid paying income taxes for up to eighteen years. In subsequent television interviews, Craig identified herself as the reporter who had received a portion of Trump's 1995 tax records in her mailbox from an anonymous sender.

On October 2, 2018, Craig and Buetner were among the three investigative journalists for The New York Times who wrote a 14,000-word exposé that revealed Trump's many fraudulent business practices and tax avoidance schemes and aimed to refute the former President's claims of self-made wealth and entrepreneurial accomplishments. The story is among the longest ever published by the paper and involved over 100,000 pages of documents both from public sources and confidential disclosures. These included "mortgages and deeds, probate records, financial disclosure reports, regulatory records and civil court files," for publicly available documents and private records such as "bank statements, financial audits, accounting ledgers, cash disbursement reports, invoices and canceled checks."

They, alongside David Barstow, went on to win the Pulitzer Prize for Explanatory Reporting in 2019 "for an exhaustive 18-month investigation of President Donald Trump's finances that debunked his claims of self-made wealth and revealed a business empire riddled with tax dodges." They also shared the 2019 George Polk Award for Political Reporting.

On February 22, 2024, Craig and Buettner announced through an Axios article that they would be publishing a book titled Lucky Loser with Penguin Random House LLC in fall of 2024. The book would draw on over twenty years' worth of Trump's confidential tax information, including the tax returns he tried to conceal, alongside business records and interviews with Trump insiders.

== Synopsis ==
Lucky Loser begins by explaining Fred Trump's life story as a shrewd businessman who profited from New York's post-war real estate market and built a vast enterprise that his son Donald Trump would later inherit. It presents evidence that Fred Trump found methods to gift large amounts of money to his children that was tax-sheltered and would turn them into millionaires before age 10.

The book says that Trump inherited the equivalent of over $400 million from his father, Fred Trump, directly contradicting Trump's public narrative that he built his real estate empire from a small loan. Trump's financial history is marked by a series of failed business ventures, including Trump Plaza Hotel and Casino, airlines, and real estate projects. Despite this, the authors allege, that he was repeatedly bailed out either by family support or fortuitous financial deals.

The book presents that Trump engaged in aggressive tax avoidance strategies, including declaring significant losses in his businesses to offset his tax liabilities over many years. These practices, while possibly legal, call into question the accuracy of Trump's portrayal of his financial success.

Lucky Loser alleges that Trump's role on The Apprentice played a crucial part in reviving his public image as a successful businessman during a period when his real financial situation was far from robust. The show, with the help of Mark Burnett, rebranded him, helping him monetize his persona despite mounting financial difficulties.

The book details how Trump relied on licensing his name for various businesses and taking on large amounts of debt, often with minimal personal financial risk. Many of these deals led to lawsuits and financial entanglements that he was able to sidestep, often without fulfilling the loans.

== Critical reception ==
The book has received overwhelming positive critical reception, especially for its investigative depth. It is praised as a standout among books about Donald Trump, with a meticulous and gripping narrative that delves into his financial history. The New York Times noted that it demands to be read, offering a definitive examination of the myth of Trump as a self-made billionaire.

Critics like economic historian Brad DeLong have also noted the thoroughness with which the book explores the complicated father-son relationship between Fred and Donald Trump, emphasizing how this dynamic shaped Donald's business practices and eventual rise to the presidency. The detailed reporting, bolstered by confidential tax documents and business records, is seen as a major strength of the book, giving readers an inside look into Trump's financial dealings over several decades.

According to The Washington Post, the book reveals how Fred Trump gave his son "almost endless collateral for loans, connections in banking and politics, and a reliable wellspring of cash to pursue dreams and fame." Newsweek also reported how the book details "how Trump suffered major losses, such as the closure of multiple casinos, and tax records show that his businesses lost more than $1 billion between 1985 and 1994."

According to John Cassidy of The New Yorker,

The more penetrating argument that Buettner and Craig make is that he's a lousy businessman who only got as far as he did because of a series of lucky breaks that "could paper over a litany of failure and still fund a lavish life."

Trump's campaign advisor, Steven Cheung, labelled the book as lies and claimed the book was "a desperate attempt to interfere" in the 2024 United States presidential election.

== Legal action ==
On September 15, 2025, Trump sued Penguin Random House and The New York Times for $15 billion in damages, accusing them of "actual malice" causing "enormous" economic losses and damage to his "professional and occupational interests." On September 19, the filing was struck down for violating civil procedure, with Trump having twenty-eight days to refile the lawsuit.

On October 16, the lawsuit, shortened to 40 pages but still demanding $15 billion in damages against all the previous defendants, was refiled in the U.S. District Court for Florida's Middle District in Tampa. The outcome is pending.

== See also ==
- Personal and business legal affairs of Donald Trump
- Targeting of political opponents and civil society under the second Trump administration
