= Alejandra Xanic von Bertrab =

Mexican investigative journalist

Alejandra Xanic von Bertrab Wilhelm is a Mexican investigative journalist. She won the Pulitzer Prize for Investigative Reporting in 2013 along with David Barstow.

== Early life and education ==
Von Bertrab moved to Guadalajara from Mexico City at the age of 14. She studied communications at the Western Institute of Technology and Higher Education (ITESO, Jesuit University of Guadalajara) located in Guadalajara. Before becoming a journalist, von Bertrab was involved in woodworking.

She obtained an M.A. as an International Journalist at the USC Annenberg School for Communication and Journalism of the University of Southern California in 1996.

== Career ==
At the age of 18, she became a radio host at her university. Two to three years later, in 1991, she became an investigative reporter at the newly founded local newspaper Siglo 21, one of the first Mexican newspapers to have a unit of investigative reporters. In 1992, she won the National Journalism Prize of Mexico for her coverage of gasoline explosions that destroyed over 8 miles of streets in Guadalajara and killed over 200, leaving 15,000 homeless. Siglo 21 was the only newspaper who covered the buildup to the explosion, with von Bertrab predicting the explosion in advance. Her other stories covered the marginalization of deaf people and villagers, as well as the assassination of Luis Donaldo Colosio and the role of passenger trains in Mexico in drug trafficking.

She kept working at Siglo 21 as it became the newspaper Publico. She then moved to Mexico City. There, she worked as a freelance journalist and was the editor of the Expansion magazine of CNN and investigated health issues as well as other social topics for the Mexican edition of Cambio. She made extensive use of the act on freedom of information in Mexico and investigated the lobbying strategies of the tobacco industry in 2010 and 2011.

In 2012, she collaborated with The New York Times journalist David Barstow on "reports on how Wal-Mart used widespread bribery to dominate the market in Mexico, resulting in changes in company practices". The company was forced to release a report detailing how they intended to prevent corrupt practices in the future. Her work with Barstow earned them the 2012 George Polk Award for Business Journalism, the 2013 Pulitzer Prize for Investigative Reporting, and the 2013 Gerald Loeb Award for Investigative business journalism. She is the first Mexican woman to be awarded a Pulitzer in that field.

Von Bertrab also won the 2013 ICFJ Knight International Journalism Award.

She has also been actively involved in the training of other Mexican journalists.
