= Elizabeth Rush =

American non-fiction author

Elizabeth Rush is an American non-fiction author best known for her books The Quickening: Antarctica, Motherhood, and Cultivating Hope in a Warming World and Rising: Dispatches from the New American Shore, the latter of which was a finalist for the Pulitzer Prize.

== Career ==
Rush is known for her environmental non-fiction writing. Her book The Quickening details a 54-day expedition she joined with 57 scientists and crew to Thwaites Glacier on Antarctica in 2019. She applied to be part of the mission through the "Antarctic Artists & Writers Program" in which two artists or writers are sent to Antarctica per year, filling a 60-page application for the opportunity.

In addition to her writing, Rush teaches creative non-fiction at Brown University.

== Personal life ==
Rush received a BA in English from Reed College in 2006. In 2010, she received a MFA from Southern New Hampshire University. Rush lives with her husband and son in Providence, Rhode Island. Her husband is a professor of 19th century Latin American literature and a Colombian immigrant.

== Awards and honors ==
Her book Rising: Dispatches from the New American Shore was a finalist for the 2019 Pulitzer Prize in General Nonfiction.

== Books ==
- The Quickening: Creation and Community at the Ends of the Earth (Milkweed Editions, 2023)
- Rising: Dispatches from the New American Shore (Milkweed Editions, 2018)
- Still Lifes from a Vanishing City
