= Mary Anne MacLeod Trump =

Mother of Donald Trump (1912–2000)

Mary Anne Trump
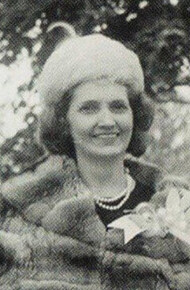
- Trump in 1964
- Born: Mary Anne MacLeod; May 10, 1912; Tong, Lewis, Scotland
- Died: August 7, 2000 (aged 88); New Hyde Park, New York, U.S.
- Burial place: Lutheran All Faiths Cemetery, New York City
- Citizenship: British subject; United States (from 1942)
- Spouse: Fred Trump (m. 1936; died 1999)
- Children: Maryanne; Fred Jr.; Elizabeth; Donald; Robert
- Relatives: Clan MacLeod
- Family: Trump family (by marriage)

Mary Anne Trump (née MacLeod; (Note: English: /məˈklaʊd/ mə-KLOWD; Scottish Gaelic: Màiri Anna Nic Leòid [ˈmaːɾʲɪ ˈan̪ˠa ɲiçkʲ ˈʎɔːtʲ].) May 10, 1912 – August 7, 2000) was a Scottish and American socialite and philanthropist who was the wife of American real-estate developer Fred Trump and the mother of five children, including Donald Trump, the 45th and 47th president of the United States.

Born a native Scottish Gaelic–speaker in the Outer Hebrides, MacLeod emigrated to the United States in 1930 and became a naturalized citizen in March 1942. She raised five children with her husband and lived in New York City.

== Early life ==
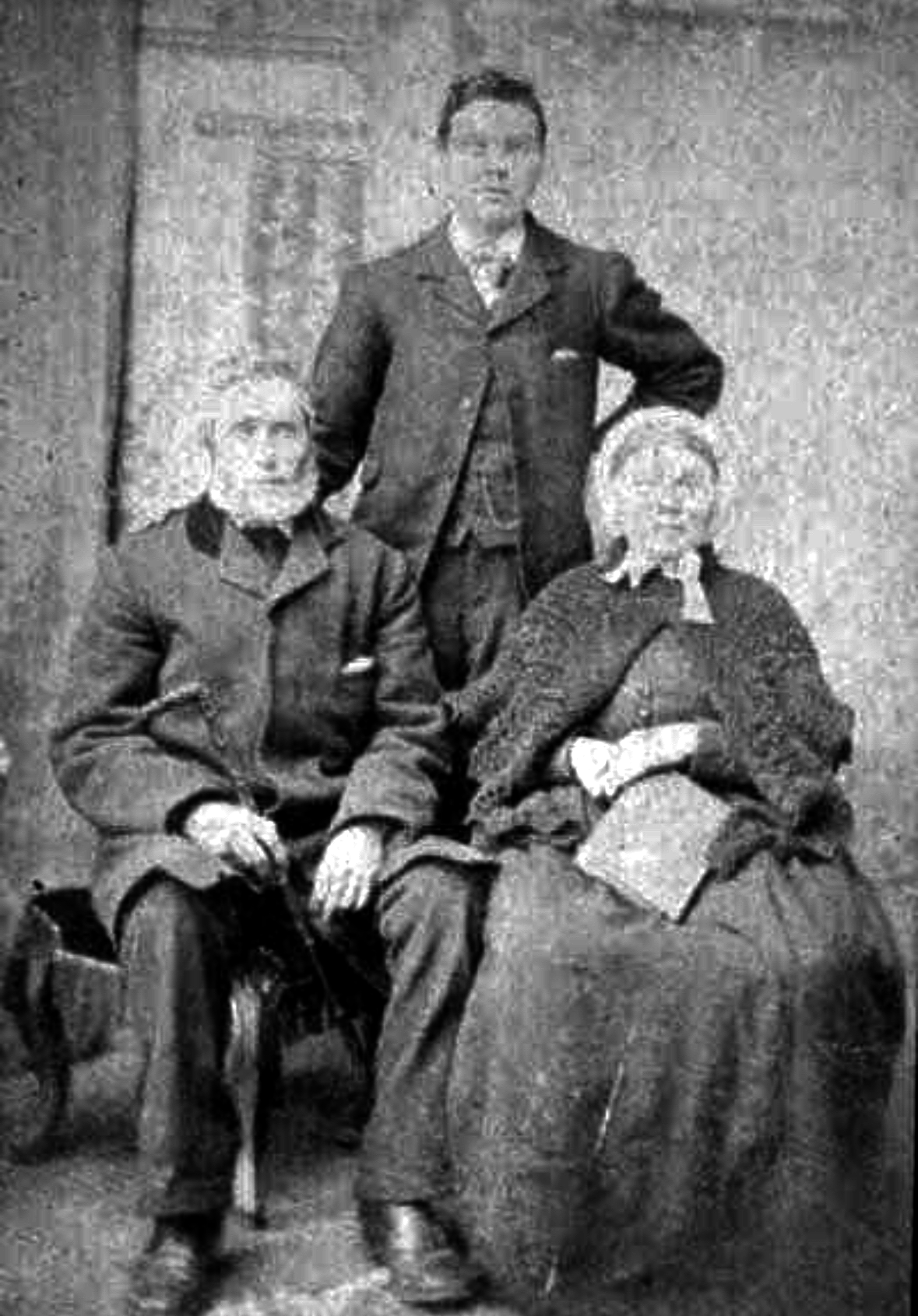
MacLeod's paternal grandparents, Alexander (1830–1900), and Anne MacLeod (1833–1923), with their son Donald (standing)

Mary Anne MacLeod was born on May 10, 1912, in the village of Tong on the Isle of Lewis. Raised in a Gaelic-speaking household, she was the youngest of ten children born to Gaelic Scottish parents, Mary MacLeod (née Smith; 1867–1963) and Malcolm MacLeod (1866–1954). Her father was a crofter, fisherman, and compulsory officer at Mary's school. English was her second language, which she learned at the school she attended until secondary school.

Her paternal grandparents were Alexander MacLeod and Anne MacLeod; her maternal grandparents were Donald Smith and Mary MacAulay. They were from Vatisker and South Lochs, respectively. Donald died at sea aged 34 when his sailing ship sank, a common fate for men in the region, which was dependent on fishing. Some of the family's earlier generations are said to have been displaced during the Highland Clearances. According to one genealogical account, displaced families in Mary's village lived in "human wretchedness" while nearby farmable land was used for sheep. Local historians have said properties at the time were "indescribably filthy", and that families in the area lived austere lives as fishers, farmers and peat diggers. The outbreak of World War I weakened the area's economy and reduced the male population further. Many of her siblings would also migrate, both to the United States and the traditional destination for Highland Scots in the period, Canada.

== Immigration to the United States ==
With several siblings having already established themselves there, MacLeod may have first visited the United States for a short stay in December 1929. She was issued immigration visa number 26698 in Glasgow on February 17, 1930. On May 2, MacLeod left Glasgow on board the RMS Transylvania arriving in New York City on May 11 (one day after her 18th birthday). She declared she intended to become a U.S. citizen and would be staying permanently in America. She was one of tens of thousands of young Scots who left for the U.S. or Canada during this period, Scotland having suffered badly the consequences of the Clearances and World War I. The alien passenger list of the Transylvania lists her occupation as a domestic worker.

Arriving in the U.S. with $50 (equivalent to $945 in 2024), MacLeod lived with her older sister, Christina Matheson in Astoria, Queens and worked as a domestic servant for at least four years. One of these jobs appears to have been as a nanny for a well-to-do family in a New York suburb, but the position was eliminated due to economic difficulties caused by the Great Depression. As a 2016 account in Scottish newspaper The National put it, she "started life in America as a dirt-poor servant escaping the even worse poverty of her native land." Having obtained a U.S. Re-entry Permit—only granted to immigrants intending to stay and gain citizenship—she returned to Scotland on the SS Cameronia on September 12, 1934. She was recorded as living in New York by April 1935 in the 1940 U.S. census.

Though the 1940 census form filed by Mary Anne and her husband, Fred Trump, stated that she was a naturalized citizen, she did not actually become one until March 10, 1942. However, there is no evidence that she violated any immigration laws prior to her naturalization, as she frequently traveled internationally and was afterwards able to re-enter the U.S. MacLeod returned to her home area in Scotland often during the course of her life and spoke Gaelic when she did.

== Marriage, family and activities ==
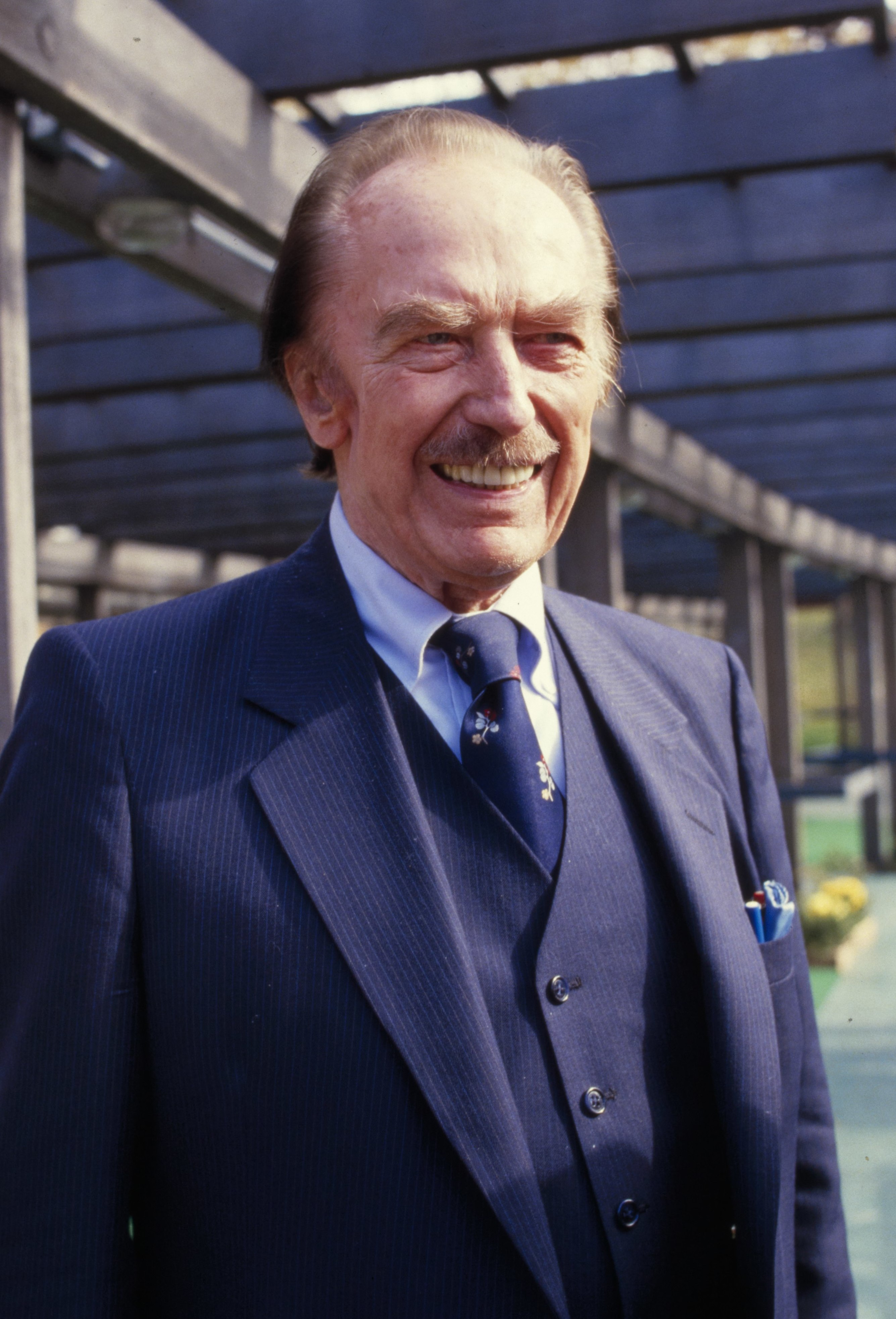
Husband Fred Trump, in 1986

In the mid-1930s, while Mary Anne was living with her sister in Queens, she met Fred Trump—already a property developer and builder—at a party; on a subsequent visit to Scotland, she told her family that she had met her future husband. They married at the Madison Avenue Presbyterian Church on the Upper East Side on January 11, 1936, with George Arthur Buttrick officiating. The wedding reception for 25 guests was held at the Carlyle Hotel in Manhattan. They honeymooned in Atlantic City, New Jersey. On April 5, 1937, she gave birth to their first child, Maryanne (1937–2023), followed by Fred C. Trump Jr. (1938–1981), Elizabeth (born 1942), Donald (born 1946), and Robert (1948–2020). The final birth led to an emergency hysterectomy, which Mary Anne barely survived.

The family lived in Jamaica, Queens, and later specifically in Jamaica Estates. At first, the couple lived in the house of MacLeod's mother-in-law, Elizabeth. By 1940 they had become upwardly mobile and hired a Scottish maid. According to family biographer Harry Hurt III, MacLeod spent time collecting coins from laundry machines in apartment buildings owned by the family; this has also been claimed by MacLeod's children about Fred Trump's mother as well as by Donald about himself.

MacLeod raised her children in the Presbyterian faith of her upbringing; on January 20, 2017, incoming U.S. President Donald Trump took his inaugural oath of office using a copy of the Revised Standard Version Bible given to him by his mother in 1955 when he graduated from a Presbyterian Sunday school. MacLeod drove a Rolls-Royce with the vanity plates that bore her initials, "MMT".

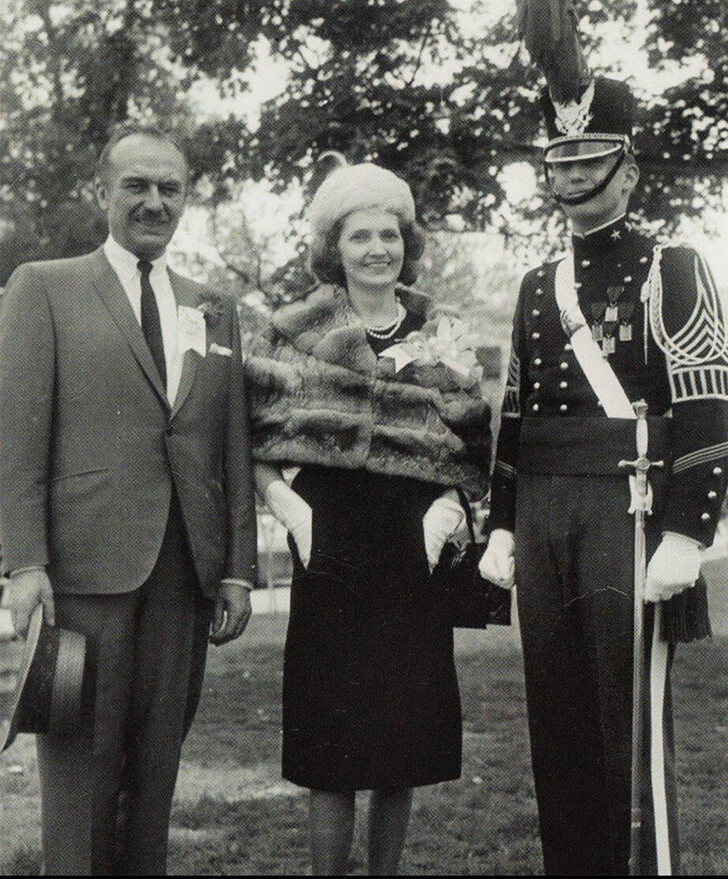
Trump with her husband and son, Donald

MacLeod also acted as a volunteer in a hospital and was involved in school activities and charities, including for the betterment of those with cerebral palsy and efforts to improve the lives of intellectually disabled adults. The Trumps were active in the Salvation Army, the Boy Scouts of America, and the Lighthouse for the Blind, among other charities. MacLeod had a significant role at the Women's Auxiliary of Jamaica Hospital and likewise at the Jamaica Day Nursery. She and her husband donated time, effort, services, and several medical buildings around New York; a 228-bed nursing home pavilion at Jamaica Hospital Medical Center, where she spent years volunteering, is named after her. MacLeod also belonged to several social clubs.

As a parent, MacLeod was more reserved than her husband. Friends of the children observed fewer interactions with her than with him. In appearance, MacLeod was a slender brunette in youth. In later years, not unlike her son Donald, she was known for an elaborate blonde hairstyle, termed a "dynamic orange swirl" by writer Mary Pilon.

In 1981, Mary Anne MacLeod's oldest son, Fred C. Trump Jr., died from complications due to alcoholism.

== Later life and death ==
As she grew older, MacLeod suffered from severe osteoporosis. On October 31, 1991, at 79, she was mugged while shopping on Union Turnpike in Long Island near her home. She resisted the mugger's attempt to steal her purse, which contained $14, and was then knocked to the ground and beaten. She sustained broken ribs, facial bruises, several fractures, a brain hemorrhage, and permanent damage to her sight and hearing. A bread-truck driver named Lawrence Herbert apprehended her 16-year-old assailant, for which Herbert was later rewarded by Donald Trump with a check that kept him from losing his home to foreclosure. Her assailant later pleaded guilty to robbery and assault, and was sentenced to three to nine years in prison.

Macleod's husband, Fred Trump, died at age 93 on June 25, 1999, after falling ill with pneumonia. MacLeod died one year later on August 7, 2000, at Long Island Jewish Medical Center in New Hyde Park, New York, at age 88. Services were held at Marble Collegiate Church in Manhattan, and she was buried alongside her husband and son (Fred Jr.) at Lutheran All Faiths Cemetery in Middle Village, Queens. The death notice in her Scottish hometown newspaper, the Stornoway Gazette, read: "Peacefully in New York on 7th August, Mary Ann [sic] Trump, aged 88 years. Daughter of the late Malcolm and Mary MacLeod, 5 Tong. Much missed."

== In popular culture ==
- She is played by Catherine McNally in the 2024 film The Apprentice.

== See also ==
- Early life and education of Donald Trump
