= David Barstow =

American journalist (born 1963)

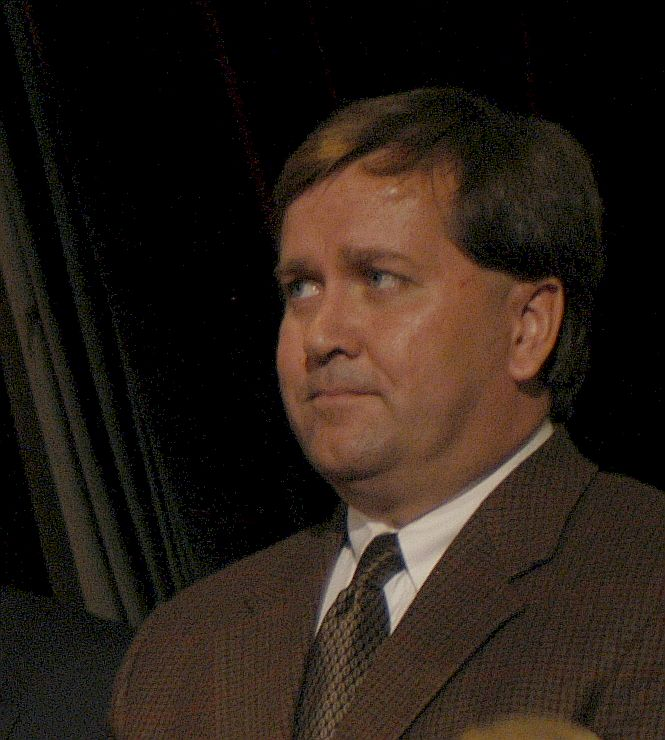
- In May 2004
- Born: January 21, 1963 (age 63); Massachusetts, U.S.
- Education: Northwestern University (BS)
- Occupations: Journalist; academic
- Employers: St. Petersburg Times (before 1999); The New York Times (1999–2019); UC Berkeley Graduate School of Journalism (2019–present)
- Awards: Pulitzer Prize for Public Service (2004); Pulitzer Prize for Investigative Reporting (2009, 2013); Pulitzer Prize for Explanatory Reporting (2019)

David Barstow (January 21, 1963) is an American journalist and professor. While a reporter at The New York Times from 1999 to 2019, Barstow was awarded, individually or jointly, four Pulitzer Prizes, becoming the first reporter in the history of the Pulitzers to be awarded this many. In 2019, Barstow joined the faculty of the UC Berkeley Graduate School of Journalism as a professor of investigative journalism.

== Background ==
Born in the Boston area, Barstow received a Bachelor of Science in journalism from Northwestern University's Medill School of Journalism in 1986.

== Career ==
Barstow worked for the St. Petersburg Times in Florida, where he was a finalist for three Pulitzer Prizes in reporting in 1997 and 1998. Following his tenure at the St. Petersburg Times, Barstow worked at The New York Times from 1999 to 2019, and was an investigative reporter there from 2002. His other newspaper affiliations include The Rochester Times-Union and the Green Bay Press-Gazette.

=== The New York Times ===
The New York Times was awarded the 2004 Pulitzer Prize for Public Service, which recognized "the work of David Barstow and Lowell Bergman that relentlessly examined death and injury among American workers and exposed employers who break basic safety rules."

In 2009, Barstow received the Pulitzer Prize for Investigative Reporting for "his tenacious reporting that revealed how some retired generals, working as radio and television analysts, had been co-opted by the Pentagon to make its case for the war in Iraq, and how many of them also had undisclosed ties to companies that benefited from policies they defended."

Barstow and Alejandra Xanic von Bertrab shared the 2013 Pulitzer Prize for Investigative Reporting and the Gerald Loeb Award for Investigative business journalism for exposing how Wal-Mart used bribery to dominate the market in Mexico.

Barstow shared the 2019 Pulitzer Prize for Explanatory Reporting with Susanne Craig and Russ Buettner for their reporting on the methods Donald Trump and his family used to avoid paying roughly half a billion dollars in taxes. Former President Donald Trump sued the authors of the article and The New York Times in 2021, but a judge dismissed the lawsuit in 2023, writing in his opinion that Mr. Trump's claims "fail as a matter of constitutional law." "Courts have long recognized that reporters are entitled to engage in legal and ordinary newsgathering activities without fear of tort liability — as these actions are at the very core of protected First Amendment activity," wrote New York Supreme Court Justice Robert Reed.

==== Ethics controversy ====
Soon after the team received the prize, it emerged that Barstow had alienated his colleagues by attempting to enter into an agreement to ghostwrite a book with one of their most secret sources, which would be a violation of the Times' ethical guidelines. In addition, Barstow had greatly upset the source by making an unannounced visit to his or her apartment, possibly putting the source's cooperation with the team at risk. Several subsequent New York Times stories about the Trump family's finances appeared under the bylines of Craig and Buettner, but not Barstow.

In June 2020, The Daily Beast reported this source was Mary L. Trump, the daughter of Fred Trump Jr. and niece of Donald Trump, who was so alarmed by Barstow's behavior she considered calling the police. Trump wrote her book, Too Much and Never Enough, without Barstow.

=== UC Berkeley Graduate School of Journalism ===
In 2019, Barstow departed the Times to join the faculty of the UC Berkeley Graduate School of Journalism as the Reva and David Logan Distinguished Chair in Investigative Journalism.

== Bibliography ==
- Barstow, David; Craig, Suzanne; Buettner, Russ (October 2, 2018). "Trump Engaged in Suspect Tax Schemes as He Reaped Riches From His Father". The New York Times.
