= John Gerzema =

American CEO and columnist

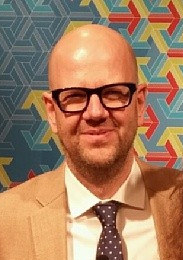
- Gerzema in 2014
- Education: Ohio State University, Northwestern University
- Occupations: Business executive, columnist

John Gerzema is an American CEO and columnist who focuses on social sciences and the impact of leadership ethics and corporate culture on consumer behavior and financial performance. He has a particular focus on female leadership traits and competencies in modern-day leadership. He is CEO of Harris Insights & Analytics, a public opinion, market research and strategy firms known widely for The Harris Poll. Previously, he was chairman and CEO of WPP Group's BAV Consulting, overseeing the BrandAsset Valuator, a consumer and brand survey. He was named one of the Top 100 Thought Leaders in Trustworthy Behavior 2014 by Trust Across America and was one of Forbes’ Must-Follow Marketing Minds on Twitter 2014.

== Book author ==
Best Countries: Defining Success and Leadership in the Twenty-First Century

Gerzema co-wrote the ebook Best Countries: Defining Success and Leadership in the Twenty-First Century with David Reibstein, Professor of Marketing at the Wharton School of the University of Pennsylvania. The book explores how countries are assessed as brands based on the proprietary model they built, in partnership with U.S. News, to create the Best Countries Rankings.

The Brand Bubble

Gerzema is the author of The Brand Bubble: The Looming Crisis in Brand Value and How to Avoid It (John Wiley & Sons, Oct. 13, 2008), written with Ed Lebar, which documented the $4 trillion overvaluation of brands in companies in contrast to their declining perceptions in the consumer data.

Spend Shift

Gerzema’s book, Spend Shift: How the Post-Crisis Values Revolution Is Changing the Way We Buy, Sell and Live (Jossey-Bass, Oct 18, 2010), written with Pulitzer-Prize winner Michael D'Antonio, studied the strategies of companies to adapt to a consumer marketplace focused on ethics, integrity and values in post-recession America. Spend Shift appeared on the "best of" lists of The Wall Street Journal, The Washington Post, Fast Company and the WEEK Magazine. The book became a TED talk, “The Post-Crisis Consumer.”

The Athena Doctrine

Gerzema's book, The Athena Doctrine: How Women (And Men Who Think Like Them) Will Rule The World, also written with D'Antonio, was published in April 2013. The book explores the rise of feminine traits and values in society, leadership, and business. The book is a New York Times and Wall Street Journal best-seller as well as a TEDx talk

Proceeds from the book benefit the United Nations Foundation’s Girl Up campaign.

== Columnist ==
Gerzema writes regular columns for the Huffington Post, Google Think Quarterly, and PSFK.

== Education ==
Gerzema received a bachelor's degree in marketing from Ohio State University in 1983 and his master's degree in Integrated Marketing from the Medill School of Journalism at Northwestern University in 1987. In 2014, Gerzema was inducted into the Medill Hall of Achievement.

== Career ==
Gerzema worked as an account supervisor at Campbell Mithun from 1987 to 1992, providing account services and brand management to a diverse array of blue-chip marketers. In 1992 Gerzema joined Fallon Worldwide, an international marketing company. While there, he co-founded account planning at Fallon Minneapolis, and was planning director and managing partner of Fallon New York (1997-2000).

In 2004, Gerzema joined Young & Rubicam as chief insights officer, overseeing oversees account planning, research, and analytics. In early 2011, Gerzema became executive chairman of BAV Consulting, a division of Burson Marsteller and the company that is responsible for BrandAsset Valuator, a global brand database and management tool. In 2017, Gerzema became CEO of Harris Insights & Analytics (Ref).

He is also a fellow with the Athena Center for Leadership Studies at Barnard College.

=== Personal ===
Gerzema is married and lives in New York with his wife, Mary, an executive at Shiseido, and daughter, Nina.
