= The Harris Poll =

American research and analytics company

- Type: Private
- Traded as: Nasdaq: HPOL
- Industry: Market research and opinion polling
- Founded: 1963; 63 years ago
- Founder: Louis Harris
- Headquarters: Chicago, Illinois; New York City
- Key people: John Gerzema (CEO), Mark Penn (chairman)
- Parent: Stagwell
- Website: theharrispoll.com

The Harris Poll is an American market research and analytics company that has been tracking the sentiment, behaviors and motivations of American adults since 1963. In addition to the traditional consulting offered, Harris has developed software data platforms that allow brands to track health and campaign success.

The Harris Poll was started by Louis Harris, an opinion pollster who founded his own firm, Louis Harris & Associates, in 1956. The business was later, in 1999, rebranded Harris Interactive. It was acquired from Nielsen in 2017 by the Stagwell Group, which hired co-chief executive officers John Gerzema and Will Johnson, who relaunched the firm as The Harris Poll. Stagwell founder and managing director Mark Penn was chairman and CEO of MDC Partners. The Harris Poll is headquartered in Chicago and New York City, with additional offices in Washington, D.C., and Rochester, New York.

The monthly Harvard–Harris Poll is a partnership between The Harris Poll, HarrisX, and Harvard University's Center for American Political Studies.

== History ==
Louis Harris did polling for candidate John F. Kennedy in 1960, as head of Louis Harris & Associates, the company he had launched in 1956. Harris then began The Harris Poll in 1963, which is one of the longest-running surveys measuring U.S. public opinion, with a history of advising leaders with their poll results during times of change such as John F. Kennedy and Ronald Reagan.

Louis Harris & Associates was bought by Gannett, and then acquired by Gordon S. Black Corporation in 1996, which in 1997 became Harris Black International Ltd., which became a public company in 1999 called Harris Interactive. In the 21st century, it was owned by Nielsen beginning in 2014; then in 2017, Stagwell Group acquired The Harris Poll and the polling company, taking it private. The polling company was relaunched by the Stagwell Group as Harris Insights & Analytics. The Harris Poll has continued through the changes in corporate ownership, its name unchanged.

Louis Harris formed the market research firm of Louis Harris & Associates in 1956. In 1960, Louis Harris & Associates became the first presidential pollster, working for the campaign of John F. Kennedy, who was elected U.S. president that year. The Harris Poll was begun by Louis Harris in 1963 to have a continuing measure of public opinion. In 1970, Harris acquired Humphrey Taylor's firm, where Humphrey was the leading strategist and pollster for the conservative party and for Margaret Thatcher in the UK.

In January 1992 at age 70, Lou Harris retired from Louis Harris & Associates, owned by Gannett Corporation at that time, and formed his second company, LH Associates.

His initial company, and The Harris Poll, was then acquired by Gordon S. Black Corporation in 1996, which in 1997 became Harris Black International Ltd., which became a public company in 1999 called Harris Interactive. In the 21st century, it was owned by Nielsen beginning in 2014; then in 2017, Stagwell Group acquired The Harris Poll and the polling company, taking it private.
