= Gwenda Blair =

American author and journalist

Gwenda Linda Blair (born 1943) is an American author and journalist known for her biographies of Jessica Savitch, Laura Ingalls Wilder, and the family of Donald Trump. She is an adjunct associate professor at the Columbia University Graduate School of Journalism.

Blair was born in Washington, D.C., to parents Newell and Greta (Flintermann) Blair. Her father was a lawyer and legal newsletter publisher. She attended Wheaton College in Massachusetts from 1960 to 1961, and graduated from the University of Michigan in 1964. During the 1970s and 80s, she was editor at New York magazines Liberation, Seven Days, and Mademoiselle, writing a monthly column for the latter, and was a contributing editor to Mother Jones and Manhattan, Inc. Her first book was a 1983 biography of writer Laura Ingalls Wilder, followed by a 1988 biography of news anchor Jessica Savitch, which was adapted into a 1995 television film. Her 2000 book The Trumps: Three Generations That Built an Empire was the basis for the 2005 TV film Trump Unauthorized, and was adapted and re-released as Donald Trump: Master Apprentice.

She appeared in the 2022 documentary Unprecedented.

== Books ==
- Laura Ingalls Wilder (1983) ISBN 978-0-399-20953-6
- Almost Golden: Jessica Savitch and the Selling of Television News (1988) ISBN 978-0-671-63285-4
- The Trumps: Three Generations That Built an Empire (2000) ISBN 0-7432-1079-4
- Donald Trump: Master Apprentice (2005) ISBN 0-7432-7510-1
