= Michael D'Antonio =

American journalist and writer

Michael D'Antonio (born May 11, 1955) is an American author, journalist, and commentator on CNN. He shared the 1984 Pulitzer Prize for Local Reporting with a team of Newsday reporters for their coverage of the Baby Jane Doe Case. He has written over a dozen books, including Never Enough, a 2015 biography of Donald Trump, and A Consequential President, a 2017 book on the presidency of Barack Obama. His 2013 book Mortal Sins: Sex, Crime, and the Era of Catholic Scandal was one of five nominees in the category of "Best Fact Crime" for a 2014 Edgar Award from the Mystery Writers of America.

D'Antonio was born in Portsmouth, New Hampshire, and graduated from the University of New Hampshire in 1977. He wrote for the Dover Democrat in New Hampshire from 1976 to 1977, and the Portland Press Herald in Maine from 1977 to 1983 before joining Newsday as a writer, where he worked from 1983 to 1990. He was also a contributing editor to Child magazine.

== Books ==
- Fall From Grace: The Failed Crusade of the Christian Right (1990)
- Heaven on Earth: Dispatches From America's Spiritual Frontier (1992)
- Atomic Harvest: Hanford and the Lethal Toll of America's Nuclear Arsenal (1993)
- The Best Medicine: Doctors, Patients, and the Covenant of Caring (with Mike Magee) (1999)
- Tin Cup Dreams: A Long Shot Makes it on the PGA Tour (2000)
- The Fourth Mega-Market, Now Through 2011 (with Ralph Acampora) (2000)
- Mosquito: A Natural History of Our Most Persistent and Deadly Foe (with Andrew Spielman) (2001)
- Tour '72: Nicklaus, Palmer, Player, Trevino; The Story of One Great Season (2002).
- Fun While It Lasted: My Rise and Fall in the Land of Fame and Fortune (with Bruce McNall) (2003)
- The State Boys Rebellion (2004)
- Hershey: Milton S. Hershey's Extraordinary Life of Wealth, Empire, and Utopian Dreams (2006)
- A Ball, a Dog, and a Monkey: 1957 – The Space Race Begins (2007)
- Forever Blue: The True Story of Walter O’Malley, Baseball’s Most Controversial Owner, and the Dodgers of Brooklyn and Los Angeles (2009)
- A Full Cup: Sir Thomas Lipton's Extraordinary Life and His Quest for the America’s Cup (2010)
- Spend Shift: How the Post-Crisis Values Revolution Is Changing the Way We Buy, Sell, and Live (with John Gerzema) (2010)
- The Athena Doctrine: How Women (and the Men Who Think Like Them) Will Rule the Future (with John Gerzema) (2013)
- Mortal Sins: Sex, Crime, and the Era of Catholic Scandal (2013)
- Never Enough: Donald Trump and the Pursuit of Success (2015) (reprinted as The Truth About Trump, 2016)
- A Consequential President: The Legacy of Barack Obama (2017)
- The Shadow President: The Truth About Mike Pence (with Peter Eisner) (2018)
- The Hunting of Hillary: The Forty-Year Campaign to Destroy Hillary Clinton (2020)
- High Crimes: The Corruption, Impunity, and Impeachment of Donald Trump (with Peter Eisner) (2020)
- Renegade: Defending Democracy and Liberty in Our Divided Country (with Adam Kinzinger) 2023
