= Susanne Craig =

Canadian journalist

Susanne Craig CM
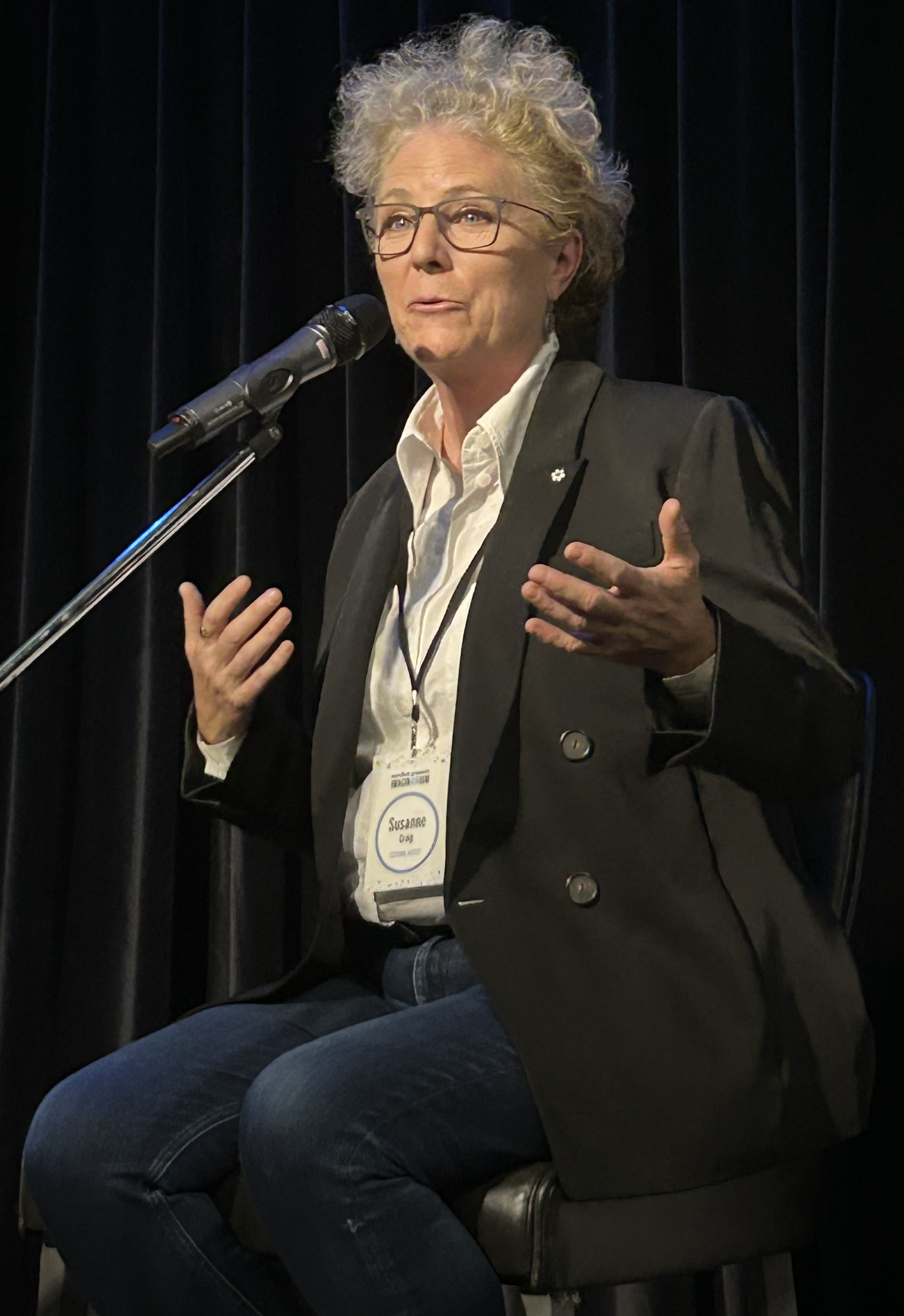
- Craig at an event for her book in 2024
- Born: 1968 (age 57–58); Calgary, Alberta, Canada
- Education: University of Calgary (BA)
- Occupations: investigative journalist; political commentator
- Years active: 1990–present
- Employers: The Globe and Mail (1996–2001); The Wall Street Journal (2001–2010); The New York Times (2010–present)
- Known for: Reporting on Donald Trump
- Notable work: Lucky Loser
- Awards: Pulitzer Prize, Gerald Loeb Award

Susanne Craig CM is a Canadian investigative journalist and author who works at The New York Times. She gained prominence for her reporting on Donald Trump's finances, revealing his 1995 tax returns during the 2016 presidential election and co-authoring a 2018 investigation into Trump's claims of self-made wealth and financial practices.

Craig received the Pulitzer Prize for Explanatory Reporting in 2019 for this work and continued to report on and investigate Trump's tax payments. She published her first book, Lucky Loser, with her colleague Russ Buettner on Donald Trump's financial and business practices in 2024.

Craig is also known for her coverage of the financial crisis of 2007–2008 and of New York State and New York City government and politics. She also serves as an on-air analyst for MSNBC, and previously worked for Canada's national newspaper The Globe and Mail and The Wall Street Journal.

== Early life and education ==
Susanne Leigh Craig was born in Calgary, Alberta, growing up in its Charleswood neighbourhood, and attended the University of Calgary, graduating in 1991 with a Bachelor of Arts in Political Science.

While at the University of Calgary, she volunteered as a reporter for the campus paper The Gauntlet where she got her start in journalism and reported on topics like student politics, dinner theatre, and movie reviews.

== Career ==
=== Career beginnings ===
Craig began her career as a summer intern for the Calgary Herald in 1990 where she covered various city transit topics and the career of Canada's first elected senator, Stan Waters. Although she struggled finding work due to a lack of formal education in journalism, her experience at the Herald encouraged her to keep pursuing a career in reporting.

She later worked on a summer contract for the Windsor Star in 1991, and after winning the inaugural Edward Goff Penny Memorial Prize for young journalists, she was offered a full-time job as a reporter at the paper in Windsor, Ontario. She then spent four years at The Star where she worked on reporting police stories and the North American Free Trade Agreement's effect on Heinz's operations in Leamington, Ontario.

First introduced to business reporting after taking on a one-month contract with The Financial Post, Craig then moved on to join The Globe and Mail in Toronto where she won the National Newspaper Award in Canada (Business – 1999) and also accepted an Honourable Mention Michener Award on behalf of the Globe.

She then went on to become a reporter for the Wall Street Journal where she has recounted a story of her interview process at the paper with Daniel Hertzberg where he allegedly said to her "money, power, and greed; what more can a reporter want?" while overlooking the New York Stock Exchange. While at the WSJ, she became the recipient of several Gerald Loeb Awards including one for deadline writing on the resignation of New York Stock Exchange Chairman Richard Grasso. Additionally, she was the lead journalist on a team that was a finalist for a Pulitzer Prize for National Affairs Reporting in relation to coverage of the Lehman Brothers and their role in the financial crisis of 2008.

=== The New York Times ===
In 2010, Craig joined The New York Times to continue reporting on Wall Street as part of its business section and DealBook newsletter. She was later promoted to the bureau chief of New York City Hall for coverage of the New York State government in 2013, and moved to Albany, New York in 2014 to continue covering on state government and municipal politics.

On October 1, 2016, The New York Times published an article authored by Craig and her colleagues David Barstow and Megan Twohey, which stated that Donald Trump had reported a loss of $916 million in 1995, which could have allowed him to avoid paying income taxes for up to eighteen years. In subsequent television interviews, Craig described having received a portion of Trump's 1995 tax records, around which the story was based, in her mailbox from an anonymous sender. She wrote that the experience "has left me eager to share a bit of advice with my fellow reporters: Check your mailboxes. Especially nowadays, when people are worried that anything sent by email will leave forensic fingerprints, 'snail mail' is a great way to communicate with us anonymously."

On October 2, 2018, the Times published a 14,000-word exposé co-authored by Craig, David Barstow, and Russ Buettner titled "Trump Engaged in Suspect Tax Schemes as He Reaped Riches From His Father." The findings of the story was based on over 100,000 pages worth of documents, both public sources and private disclosures, that allegedly revealed the inner workings of Trump's financial practices and claimed misleading statements about his self-made wealth and business empire.

In 2019, Craig and the two other reporters shared the Pulitzer Prize for Explanatory Reporting for "an exhaustive 18-month investigation of President Donald Trump's finances that debunked his claims of self-made wealth and revealed a business empire riddled with tax dodges". They also shared the 2019 George Polk Award for Political Reporting.

On September 27, 2020, Craig and others further reported on Trump's tax record, demonstrating how Trump paid $750 in federal income tax during 2016 and no income taxes at all in 10 of the previous 15 years.

Craig has stated that since her coverage of Trump and his finances, she has received death threats and high-profile criticism. In 2020, Donald Trump sued The New York Times Company, Craig, Buettner, Barstow, and Mary L. Trump, accusing his niece of conspiring with the reporters in an "insidious plot" to obtain his tax records. In May 2023, a New York Supreme Court judge in Manhattan dismissed the lawsuit, concluding that Donald Trump's claims "fail as a matter of constitutional law" and that investigation into his finances was protected by the First Amendment. The court also ordered him to pay nearly $392,000 to the Times and its reporters to cover the cost of the legal defense; the order was made under the anti-SLAPP law, which penalizes baseless litigation aimed at silencing criticism.

In 2021, Craig started serving as an on-air analyst for MSNBC, where she has spoken about her research into Trump's finances, tax returns, and his indictment and criminal trial. She has also spoken on-air about her reporting on Robert F. Kennedy Jr.

=== Lucky Loser ===
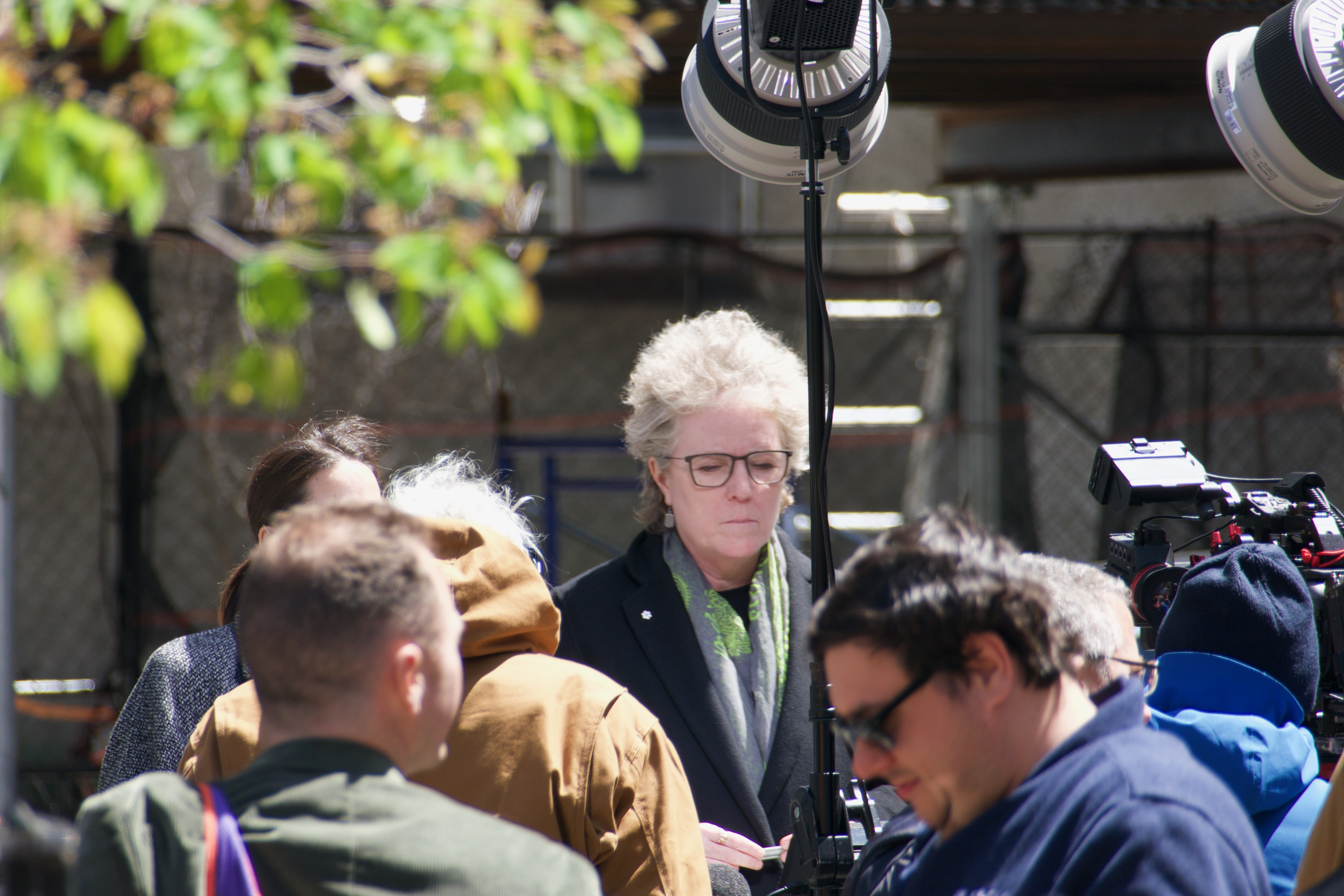
Craig at Trump's New York trial in May 2024

On February 22, 2024, Craig announced through an Axios exclusive that she would be publishing a book titled Lucky Loser: How Donald Trump Squandered His Father's Fortune and Created The Illusion of Success with Penguin Random House LLC in collaboration with her colleague Russ Buettner on September 10, 2024. The book would draw on over twenty years' worth of Trump's confidential tax information, including the tax returns he tried to conceal, alongside business records and interviews with Trump insiders. It was released on September 17, 2024.

In interviews, Craig said she intended to present a fact-based account of Trump's alleged financial mismanagement, drawing attention to the contradictions between his public persona and private failures. The book was met with highly positive critical reception, especially for its investigative depth and narration of Fred Trump's life and finances and how it bolstered his son's fortune. Critics like Bethany Maclean of The Washington Post said "the news in their book lies not in one specific detail, but rather in the sheer accumulation of damning facts", while John Cassidy of The New Yorker praised Craig for making the argument that "he's a lousy businessman who only got as far as he did because of a series of lucky breaks that could paper over a litany of failure and still fund a lavish life."

While praised for the pursuit of truth behind Trump's financial empire, Craig faced public criticism from Trump's camp. Campaign advisor Steven Cheung dismissed the book as a "desperate attempt to interfere" in the 2024 United States presidential election. Craig has defended the integrity of her work, pointing to the years of rigorous fact-checking and source verification involved.

== Awards ==
- 1991 Inaugural Edward Goff Penny Award
- 1999 National Newspaper Awards – Business
- 1999 Michener Award for The Globe and Mail – Honourable Mention
- 2004 Gerald Loeb Award for Deadline Writing shared with Ianthe Jeanne Dugan, Kate Kelly and Theo Frances for "The Day Grasso Quit as NYSE Chief"
- 2008 Gerald Loeb Award for Beat Writing shared with Kate Kelly, Serena Ng, David Reilly for "Breakdown at Bear Stearns"
- 2009 Gerald Loeb Award for Breaking News shared with Carrick Mollenkamp, Serena Ng, Aaron Lucchetti, Matthew Karnitschnig, Dan Fitzpatrick, Deborah Solomon, Dennis K. Berman, Liam Pleven, Peter Lattman and Annelena Lobb for "The Day That Changed Wall Street"
- 2017 Inaugural Nellie Bly Award for Investigative Reporting – Museum of Political Corruption
- 2019 Pulitzer Prize for Explanatory Reporting shared with David Barstow and Russ Buettner for The New York Times
- 2019 George Polk Award for Political Reporting, shared with the same two colleagues
- 2019 Society for Advancing Business Editing and Writing Best in Business Award - Real Estate, shared with same two colleagues.
- 2019 Honorary LLD from University of Calgary
- 2021 Society of Professional Journalists' NYC Club's Daniel Pearl Prize for Investigative Reporting shared with the same winners as the Pulitzer.
- 2023 Member of the Order of Canada

== Personal life ==
Craig is the sister-in-law of former Calgary city councillor Ward Sutherland.
