= The Trumps: Three Generations That Built an Empire =

2000 book by Gwenda Blair

- Publisher: Simon & Schuster
- Publication date: 2000
- Publication place: New York
- Pages: 592
- ISBN: 0684808498
- OCLC: 1031898715

The Trumps: Three Generations That Built an Empire is a 2000 biographical book written by Gwenda Blair, an adjunct professor at Columbia University Graduate School of Journalism, about three generations of the Trump family, starting with Friedrich Trump (1869–1918) who immigrated to the United States in 1885 from Kingdom of Bavaria (now in Germany), then Fred Trump (1905–1999), and finally Donald Trump (b. 1946). It was first published by Simon & Schuster in 2000 and reprinted in 2015 with a new title, The Trumps: Three Generations of Builders and a President and a new preface.

== Background ==
The Trumps was Gwenda Blair's third biography. When she began her research for The Trumps, Blair had intended to write a book about Donald Trump, but as she researched his father and grandfather, it became a "history of American entrepreneurship."

In a 2016 article in The Guardian, Blair described how Trump's "voice, language, confidence" helped him win the election. Blair said his voice had a "hint of menace beneath the surface", and an "unpolished immediacy". His "stew of conversational snippets and memory scraps, random phrases and half-thoughts" reminds people of the "voice inside their own heads." (Note: The article was described as "an expanded version" of the preface for a new edition of The Trumps: Three Generations of Builders and a Presidential Candidate.)

== Publisher's summary ==
The publisher's summary described the generational story of the Trump family as one that parallels the history of the United States starting with immigrants who made small fortunes during the Klondike Gold Rush. In the second generation, in the 1940s and 1950s, Fred Trump made his fortune in housing developments through the New Deal, "using government subsidies and loopholes". The next generation, which included Fred Jr., Maryanne, and President Donald Trump continued to benefit from the family fortune.

== Reviews ==
In his 2000 book review of The Trumps: Three Generations That Built an Empire in The New York Times, David Margolick described Blair's "efforts to show some kind of genetic link between the generations" as "labored" with readers "struggling through the long sections on grandfather Friedrich and father Fred" to get to what really intrigued them, Donald Trump, who Blair had described as "the most famous man in America, if not the world" in 1989. Margolick described her section on Friedrich Trumpf as padded and "heavy-handed foreshadowing". He wrote that her section on Fred Trump, while too lengthy and rambling, "pick[ed] up speed and gravity". He said that in her section on Donald Trump, she "neatly captures [his] uncanny business instincts, as well as his competitiveness, chutzpah, cruelty, vulgarity and hucksterism. And she catches him in his lies, or what Trump himself calls truthful hyperbole. Margolick wrote that Blair's book is "conscientious", "prodigiously" researched, written "with authority", and with "cogent" "descriptions of intricate deals"." She "unmasks Trump" but is neither as "caustic" or gloating as she could have been. He concludes that Blair depicted the Trump that everyone already knew: "Donald Trump is like one of his typical buildings: lots of glitter on the outside but nothing profound below."

In her New York Times review of the 2000 publication, Janet Maslin described Blair's book The Trumps: Three Generations That Built an Empire as a "no-win proposition" even though it is an "exhaustive", and "copiously researched study". Maslin wrote that the section on the first generation was "cobbled together" with "dubious" claims as most of it was "undocumented". She said that Blair was on "more solid ground with the story of how Fred Trump carved out a real estate empire in Brooklyn". While Blair's portrait of Donald Trump is that of a "germ-phobic anti-Gatsby," Maslin concludes that Trump remained in "full control of his own image and reputation, impregnable to the kinds of details that emerge [in Blair's book]."

In his 2000 The New York Review of Books entitled "Golden Boy", James Traub questioned why bother revisiting Trump in 2000, when he is "an almost sickeningly familiar figure to much of the reading public". Traub said that "Donald Trump is the price you pay for living in a marketplace culture". He wrote that Blair's strategy of turning "Trump’s life into the final stage of a multigenerational saga" made sense in New York, where "real estate has been a family business...since the time of the Astors and the Goelets in the late eighteenth century".

The publisher's summary cited positive reviews from The New York Observer's Robert Gottlieb, The Philadelphia Inquirer 's Steve Weinberg, The San Diego Union-Tribune 's Cintra Wilson, and Kirkus Reviews. The latter compared Blair's reconstruction to "the best work of David Halberstam and Robert Caro."

== German origins ==
In a film released in 2014 entitled Kings of Kallstadt by filmmaker Simone Wendel, Trump confirmed that his grandfather Friedrich Trump came from the small village of Kallstadt, in southwest Germany. The village, which is now the home to 1200 people, has been home to Trumps for hundreds of years. The film featured the home of Trump's grandfather which is still in very good condition.

== Donald Trump: Master Apprentice ==
In 2005, The Trumps: Three Generations That Built an Empire was adapted and re-released as Donald Trump: Master Apprentice.

== Trump Unauthorized ==
American Broadcasting Company (ABC)'s 2005 two-hour biography television film, Trump Unauthorized, chronicling 25 years of Donald Trump's personal and business life, was based on The Trumps: Three Generations That Built an Empire and Donald Trump: Master Apprentice.
