= Harry Hurt III =

American author and journalist

- Born: November 13, 1951 (age 74); Houston, Texas, U.S.
- Education: Harvard College
- Occupations: Author; journalist
- Spouse: Alison Becker (m. 1993)

Harry Hurt III (born November 13, 1951) is an American author and journalist. He was formerly senior editor of the Texas Monthly and a Newsweek correspondent, and his articles have appeared in publications such as The New York Times, Sports Illustrated, Esquire and Playboy. His books include Texas Rich, a biography of oil tycoon H. L. Hunt and family; and Lost Tycoon: The Many Lives of Donald J. Trump (1993), an unauthorized biography of real estate mogul and 45th and 47th President of the United States, Donald Trump.

Hurt was born in Houston, Texas, the son of Margaret (Birting) Hurt and Harry Hurt Jr., who was president of Hurt Oil Company in Houston. He graduated from Choate School in 1969 and Harvard College in 1974, where he wrote for the Harvard Crimson. He worked for the Texas Monthly in Austin, serving as senior editor from 1975 to 1986. He later moved to Sag Harbor, New York, and married Alison Becker in 1993. He also had an early career in professional golf, which he revisited in the mid-1990s in writing Chasing the Dream: A Mid-life Quest for Fame and Fortune on the Pro Golf Circuit.

== Books ==
- Texas Rich: The Hunt Dynasty from the Early Oil Days Through the Silver Crash, W.W. Norton (1981)
- For All Mankind, Atlantic Monthly Press (1988)
- Lost Tycoon: The Many Lives of Donald J. Trump, W.W. Norton (1993)
- Chasing the Dream: A Midlife Quest for Fame and Fortune on the Pro Golf Circuit, Avon Books (1997),
- How to Learn Golf, Pocket Books (2002)
- Hurt Yourself: In Executive Pursuit of Action, Danger, and a Decent Looking Pair of Swim Trunks, St. Martin’s Press (2008)
