= Russ Buettner =

American investigative journalist

Russ Buettner is an American investigative journalist who works for The New York Times. In 2019 he and two colleagues received the Pulitzer Prize for Explanatory Reporting for a 2018 series of articles about the finances of Donald Trump.

Buettner graduated from California State University, Sacramento, where he wrote for the student newspaper, The State Hornet. He subsequently attended the Missouri School of Journalism. Since 1992 he has reported from the New York City area.

Before joining the Times in 2006 he worked at The New York Daily News and New York Newsday. He was part of the Times team that investigated and published Trump's 1995 state tax returns, after they were anonymously mailed to his colleague Susanne Craig in October 2016. The Times analysis found that he had declared a $916 million loss that year, which could have allowed him to pay no taxes at all for 18 subsequent years. Since then the primary focus of Beuttner's research and reporting has been Trump's personal finances.

In June 2016 he and a colleague wrote a widely cited report about Trump's bankrupt Atlantic City casinos, saying that Trump put very little of his own money into those enterprises while collecting millions of dollars in salary, bonuses, and other payments.

In 2018 Buettner and colleagues reported that despite Trump's claims to be a self-made billionaire, he had actually received more than $400 million (in 2018 dollars) from his father Fred Trump, most of it in ways that avoided paying gift or inheritance tax. The 14,000 word report was one of the longest investigative articles ever published by the Times. The 2019 Pulitzer Prize for Explanatory Reporting was awarded to authors Buettner, Craig, and David Barstow "For an exhaustive 18-month investigation of President Donald Trump’s finances that debunked his claims of self-made wealth and revealed a business empire riddled with tax dodges". He and the same two colleagues also received the 2019 George Polk Award for Political Reporting.

In September 2020 the Times team acquired more than two decades' worth of Trump's tax records, including the first two years of his presidency. Their reporting showed that he paid no federal income taxes in ten out of the preceding fifteen years, and only $750 in each of two other years. They described "struggling properties, vast write-offs, an audit battle and hundreds of millions in debt coming due."
