= Winship =

Winship may refer to:

== People ==
=== Surname ===
- Albert Edward Winship (1845–1933), American educator and educational journalist; father of Laurence and George
- Blanton Winship (1869–1947), American military lawyer, veteran of the Spanish–American War and World War I
- Christopher Winship (born 1950), Diker-Tishman Professor of sociology at Harvard University
- Elizabeth Winship (1921–2011), writer and columnist; wife of Thomas
- George Parker Winship (1871–1952), American librarian and author; son of Albert
- Jonathan Winship (1780–1843), American 19th-century sailor and entrepreneur
- Laurence L. Winship (1890–1975), American newspaper editor; son of Albert, father of Thomas
- Robert Winship (1834–1899), 19th century Atlanta businessman
- Ted Winship (1900–1929), English professional football left back
- Thomas Winship (1920–2002), American newspaper editor; son of Laurence, husband of Elizabeth
- Tommy Winship (1890–1976), English footballer
- Vanessa Winship (born 1960), British photographer

=== Given name ===
- Alden Winship Clausen (1923–2013), President of the World Bank from 1981 to 1986
- Winship C. Connor (1848–1921), businessman, mayor of Dallas
- Margaret Winship Eytinge (1832–1916), New York-based author
- Robert Winship Woodruff (1889–1985), president of The Coca-Cola Company 1923–1954

== Other ==
- Winship Point, Potter Cove, King George Island, South Shetland Islands
- Ginger Winship, fictional character in Much Obliged, Jeeves, a comic novel by P. G. Wodehouse

== See also ==
- Charles Winship House, historic house in Wakefield, Massachusetts
- Winship Cancer Institute, nonprofit cancer research and patient care center in Atlanta, Georgia
- Winship Elementary School in Boston, Massachusetts, United States
- In re Winship, 397 U.S. 358 (1970), United States Supreme Court decision
