= Ben Taylor =

Ben Taylor or Benjamin Taylor may refer to:

== Sports ==
- Ben Taylor (American football) (born 1978), former American football linebacker
- Ben Taylor (first baseman, born 1927) (1927–1999), American Major League Baseball first baseman
- Ben Taylor (pitcher, born 1889) (1889–1946), American professional baseball pitcher
- Ben Taylor (pitcher, born 1992) (born 1992), American professional baseball pitcher
- Ben Taylor (first baseman, born 1888) (1888–1953), Negro league baseball player
- Benjamin Taylor (cricketer) (1873–1938), English cricketer active 1902–09 who played for Nottinghamshire
- Benjamin Taylor (field hockey) (born 1976), Australian field hockey player

== Politics ==
- Benjamin I. Taylor (1877–1946), U.S. Representative from New York
- Benjamin Taylor (Australian politician) (1843–1886), member of the South Australian House of Assembly

== Other ==
- Ben Cuimermara Taylor (born 1938), Noongar elder from the south-west of Western Australia
- Ben Taylor (newspaper editor), British newspaper editor
- Benedict Taylor (musician) (born 1982), British musician
- Benedict Taylor (born 1960), aka Ben Taylor, British actor
- Benjamin Taylor (author) (born 1952), American author
- Benjamin B. Taylor (born c. 1947), American former journalist and publisher of The Boston Globe
- Benjamin Broomhead Taylor, architect based in Sheffield, England
- Ben Taylor, a basketball analyst, writer, and host of Thinking Basketball
- Ben Taylor, a character from children's show Postman Pat and the children's film Postman Pat: The Movie
