= Mariette DiChristina =

American science journalist

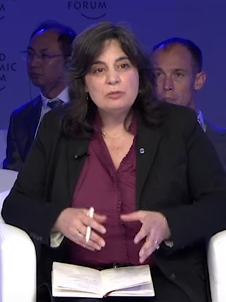
- Mariette DiChristina in 2017
- Born: April 16, 1964 (age 62); North Tarrytown, New York, U.S.
- Education: Boston University (BS, Journalism, 1986)
- Occupations: Journalist, academic administrator
- Employer: Boston University
- Known for: First female editor-in-chief of Scientific American

Mariette DiChristina is an American science journalist and academic administrator. She is dean of the Boston University College of Communication, where she is also a professor of journalism. She was editor-in-chief of Scientific American from December 2009 to September 2019, becoming the first woman to hold that role since its founding in 1845. She was executive vice president of Springer Nature, overseeing the editorial and publishing operations of Scientific American and Nature with more than 160 staff members in ten countries.

DiChristina is a Fellow of the American Association for the Advancement of Science (AAAS) and has been on advisory bodies including the World Economic Forum's "Top 10 Emerging Technologies" steering group and the United States National Academies of Sciences, Engineering, and Medicine.

== Early life and education ==
DiChristina grew up in North Tarrytown, New York. She developed an early interest in science and space, and has said she could recite the orbital periods of satellites as a child. Though she considered a career in astronomy, she turned toward writing and journalism instead. She attended Boston University, majoring in journalism at what is now the Boston University College of Communication, and graduated in 1986.

== Career ==
=== Popular Science (1987–2001) ===
After graduating, DiChristina joined Gannett Westchester Newspaper as a municipal reporter in Pelham, New York. She moved to Popular Science in 1987 as a copy editor, and then moved to associate editor and senior editor roles, before being named executive editor in 1997. Her coverage of space exploration, including the Hubble Space Telescope and extrasolar planets, helped the magazine win the Space Foundation's Douglas S. Morrow Public Outreach Award in 2001. Times Mirror Magazines, the magazine's publisher, named her Editor of the Year.

=== Scientific American (2001–2019) ===
In 2001, DiChristina joined Scientific American as executive editor. She also launched and edited Scientific American Mind, a bimonthly publication on the subjects of psychology and neuroscience. In June 2009, following the departure of editor-in-chief John Rennie, she became acting editor-in-chief; Nature Publishing Group confirmed her appointment permanently in December 2009. She was the eighth editor-in-chief in the magazine's history and the first woman to hold the post. The magazine won the National Magazine Award for General Excellence under her leadership. Digital traffic to the magazine's website grew by more than 500 percent during her tenure.

In 2015, DiChristina took on the additional role of executive vice president at Springer Nature, overseeing a staff of more than 160 people across ten countries and managing the Scientific American and Nature brands. In spring 2005, she served as Science Writer in Residence at the University of Wisconsin–Madison. Her chapter on science editing appears in the second edition of A Field Guide for Science Writers.

In 2013, Danielle N. Lee, a scientist who blogged at Scientific American, was called an "urban whore" in an email by an editor at the science website Biology Online after refusing to write professional content without compensation. "Are you an urban scientist or an urban whore?", the editor asked after she declined to contribute unpaid work on Biology Online's blog. Lee wrote a response to the email and posted it on the Scientific American blog. Then editor-in-chief DiChristina removed Lee's post, citing legal reasons: "Unfortunately, we could not quickly verify the facts of the blog post and consequently for legal reasons we had to remove the post," she said. She later told BuzzFeed the post was also outside the remit of the blog, which is to post information on science topics, and "verged into the personal." Numerous media outlets viewed Scientific American's actions as censorship. A number of people posted on Twitter with support for Lee, under the hashtags #standingwithDNLee and #BoycottSciAm. The editor at Biology Online was fired after the incident.

=== Boston University (2019–present) ===
DiChristina returned to her alma mater in August 2019 as dean of the Boston University College of Communication, succeeding two-time Pulitzer Prize winner Thomas Fiedler. She has more than 80 full-time faculty, over 100 part-time instructors, 45 staff, and approximately 2,600 students under her in journalism, advertising, film and television, communication, emerging media, and public relations programs.

DiChristina led the college to establish the Center for Media Innovation & Social Impact (MISI), backed by $2.25 million in funding from the College of Communications and additional funding from the Feld Family Initiative for Civic Science Communication. The center uses the services of faculty across the College of Communications' departments and offers fellowships to community partners, with a focus on strengthening local news and using science communication to help with various problems. The center's official launch took place in November 2025 at a daylong "Communicating Climate" summit, which featured an interactive circus performance and trust building workshop led by Pedro Mello e Cruz. The college also launched The Newsroom, a course connecting student journalists with local news outlets across eastern Massachusetts. During its first full year of operation, 64 student reporters published over 300 articles across 31 local news organizations.

On September 7, 2022, Brian McGrory announced he would step down as editor of The Boston Globe at the end of the year to become chair of Boston University's journalism department. In 2018, former Globe editor Hilary Sargent accused McGrory of sexual harassment while he was overseeing her work. McGrory denied the allegation, and an internal investigation cleared him of wrongdoing. In a statement to BU Today, DiChristina praised McGrory's leadership and vision. “In a world where journalism is both more vital than ever and also more challenged, Brian has provided exceptional leadership at one of the most respected journalistic enterprises in the nation,” DiChristina said. “He brings high standards, an innovative approach to newsrooms going through change, and a deep commitment to diversity, equity, and inclusion.”

In 2025, DiChristina granted McGrory a leave of absence to return to the Globe on a temporary basis as its editor, replacing Nancy Barnes. In an email to students, McGrory wrote that he planned to be back at BU “sometime in 2027” or possibly sooner. In a September 10, 2026, memo to Globe staff, McGrory announced his resignation from Boston University, writing, “After discussions with Dhiraj [Nayar, president of Boston Globe Media], Linda [Henry, Globe Media’s CEO], and Mariette DiChristina, the dean at BU, this seemed to be the right thing to do.”

=== Other roles and affiliations ===
DiChristina chairs the steering group for the World Economic Forum's "Top 10 Emerging Technologies" annual report. She is on the Standing Committee on Advancing Science Communication and the Climate Crossroads advisory committee, both under the United States National Academies of Sciences, Engineering, and Medicine. She is on the board of WBUR, Boston's NPR news station, and on the board of trustees of the Society for Science, publisher of Science News. She joined the Rita Allen Foundation board of directors in 2024.

In July 2014, she testified before the United States Senate Committee on Commerce, Science, and Transportation at a hearing on federal research and development investment. In the hearing she argued for sustained government funding of basic scientific research. DiChristina was president of the National Association of Science Writers in 2009 and 2010, when the organization had approximately 2,500 members. She previously chaired Science Writers in New York (2001–2004) and was an adjunct professor in the graduate Science, Health and Environmental Reporting program at New York University's Arthur L. Carter Journalism Institute. She is a member of the American Society of Magazine Editors and the Society of Environmental Journalists.

=== Epstein correspondence ===
In February 2026, Boston University's student newspaper The Daily Free Press reported that DiChristina had exchanged emails in 2014 and 2015 with convicted sex offender Jeffrey Epstein. These emails, released by the United States Department of Justice under the Epstein Files Transparency Act, showed that DiChristina and Epstein made plans for an in-person meeting at his Manhattan townhouse in July 2014 and scheduled phone calls. DiChristina also asked Epstein to attend an editorial meeting at Scientific American. All of this communication occurred after Epstein had pleaded guilty in 2008 to soliciting a minor for prostitution and registered as a sex offender, which received a lot of press coverage at the time. After their July 29, 2014 meeting, DiChristina wrote in an email to a recipient whose name was redacted, that she was "inspired to help him with his worthy goals."

A Boston University spokesperson, speaking for DiChristina, said it was part of her job at Scientific American to speak with people who showed interest in science, and that the magazine did not conduct background checks before such conversations. The spokesperson also said DiChristina was never invited to a conference on Epstein's private island. Emails released by the Department of Justice included correspondence from Epstein in 2010 that showed DiChristina on a guest list for a meeting on “the islands.” Wired magazine covered the story as part of broader reporting on the connections of faculty to Epstein at American universities.

The information led to criticism from faculty and students at the College of Communication. The College of Communication's Student Government cancelled DiChristina's invitation to its spring semester town hall and released a statement requesting her to address the email correspondence that was uncovered.

On March 31, 2026, DiChristina addressed students directly, apologizing for not speaking sooner. She said the delay was due to work travel, spring break, and underestimating "how upsetting it was for some people". She added: "I can't help what happened in the past. I really wish I knew then [2014] what everybody learned in 2019 that I didn't know then myself." Olivia Rajakovic, a journalism department representative in COM Student Government who attended the event, said DiChristina's justifications were "too little, too late".

The Boston Globe, under the renewed direction of editor Brian McGrory, then on leave from the College of Communication, reported new information revealed in the files about Epstein's connections with Boston-area academic leaders, including Lawrence Summers, Martin Nowak, George Church, and Moche Hoffman but did not report about DiChristina's ties.

=== Zelnick lawsuit ===
In March 2026, The Daily Free Press reported that Marni Zelnick, a former professor at the Boston University College of Communication, had filed a lawsuit in federal court against the university seeking $1.6 million in damages. Zelnick alleged she experienced gender discrimination and retaliation from DiChristina's office between 2022 and 2025.

== Recognition ==
- 2001: Douglas S. Morrow Public Outreach Award (Space Foundation), for space coverage at Popular Science.
- 2009: Honored by New York's Italian Heritage and Culture Committee for contributions to science journalism.
- 2010: Named one of the "Three Wise Women" of 2009 by the National Organization of Italian American Women.
- 2011: Elected Fellow of the American Association for the Advancement of Science, Section on General Interest in Science and Engineering.
- 2014: Named a "Corporate Visionary" in Folio's Top Women in Digital Media.
- 2016: Distinguished Alumni Award for Service to Profession, Boston University College of Communication.
