= House at 12 West Water Street =

Historic house in Massachusetts, United States

- U.S. National Register of Historic Places
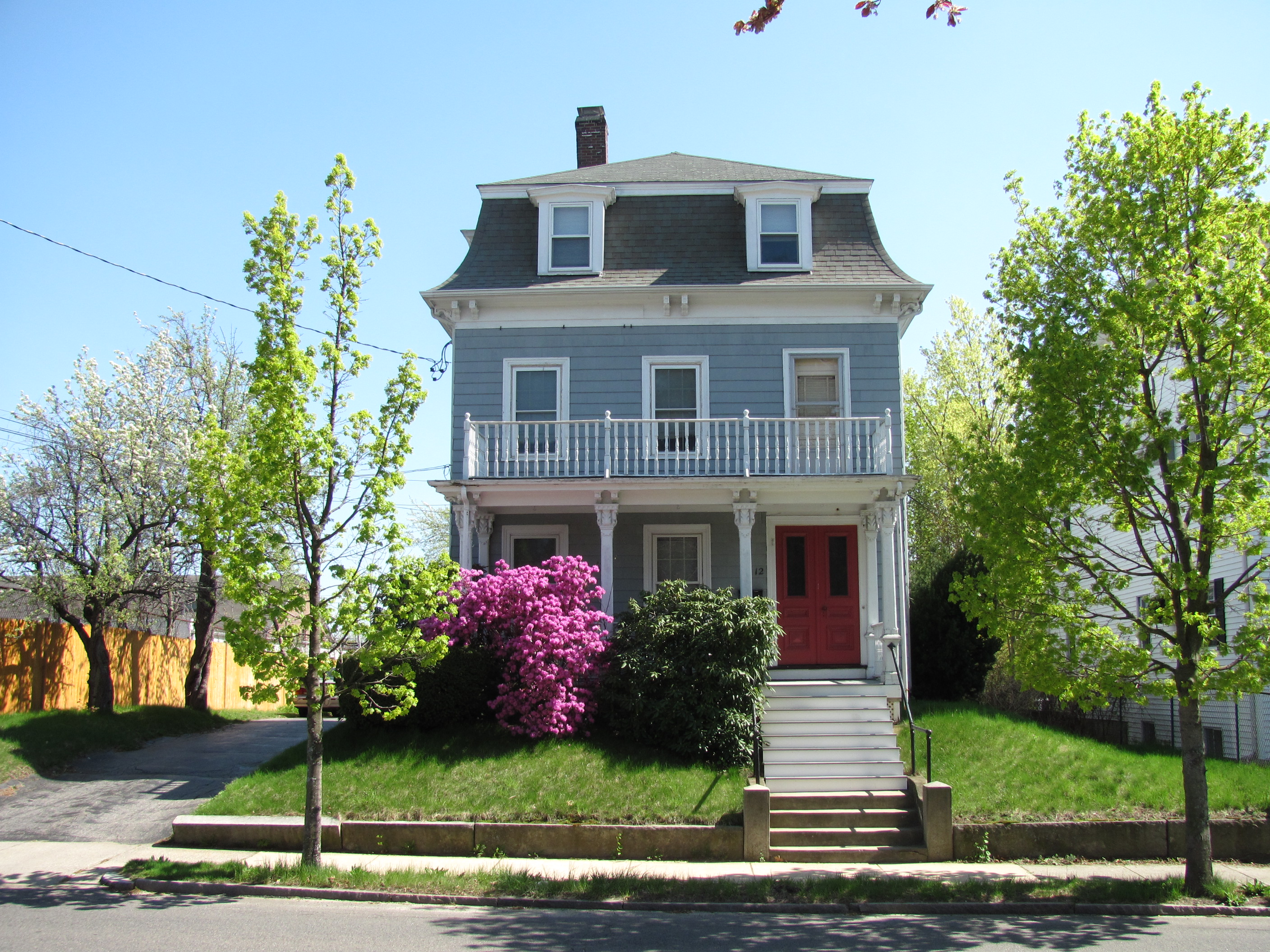
- House at 12 West Water Street

- Location within Massachusetts Location within the United States
- Location: 12 W. Water St., Wakefield, Massachusetts
- Coordinates: 42°30′7″N 71°4′17″W
- Built: 1860
- Architectural style: Second Empire, Mansard
- MPS: Wakefield MRA
- NRHP reference No.: 89000708
- Added to NRHP: July 06, 1989

The House at 12 West Water Street in Wakefield, Massachusetts is a rare local example of a Second Empire house. The wood-frame house was built around 1860, and has two full stories, with a third beneath the mansard roof. It is three bays wide, with a wide double-door entry, and a porch across the front with elaborately decorated posts. The house may have been built by Cyrus Wakefield, owner of the Wakefield Rattan Company, and sold to a company employee. A later owner was George Cox, who owned a billiard parlor in the town center.

The house was listed on the National Register of Historic Places in 1989.

== See also ==
- National Register of Historic Places listings in Wakefield, Massachusetts
- National Register of Historic Places listings in Middlesex County, Massachusetts
