= Boston Evening Traveller =

Massachusetts daily newspaper (1845–1967)

Coordinates: 42°21′31.67″N 71°3′24.87″W

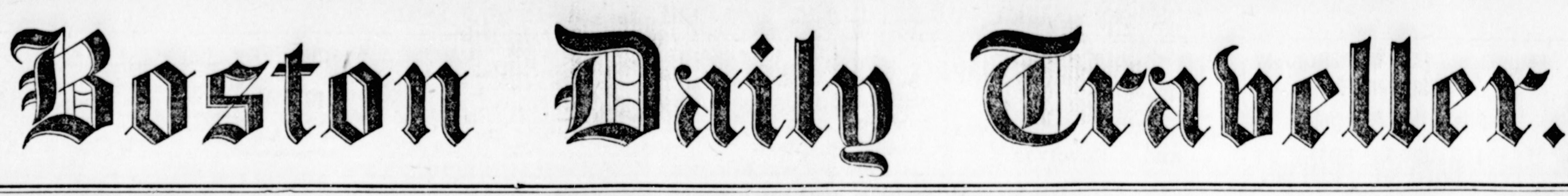
Masthead of Boston Daily Traveller on June 26, 1891

The Boston Evening Traveller (1845–1967) was a newspaper published in Boston, Massachusetts. It was a daily newspaper, with weekly and semi-weekly editions under a variety of Traveller titles. It was absorbed by the Boston Herald in 1912, and ceased publication in 1967.

== History ==
=== Founding ===
The Boston Evening Traveller was launched on April 1, 1845, by Reverend George Punchard and Deacon Ferdinand Andrews. The pair served as co-editors and used the paper to advocate for the temperance movement. In June 1845, Roland Worthington, a former member of the Boston Daily Advertiser's business department, joined the paper as publisher.

=== Worthington years ===
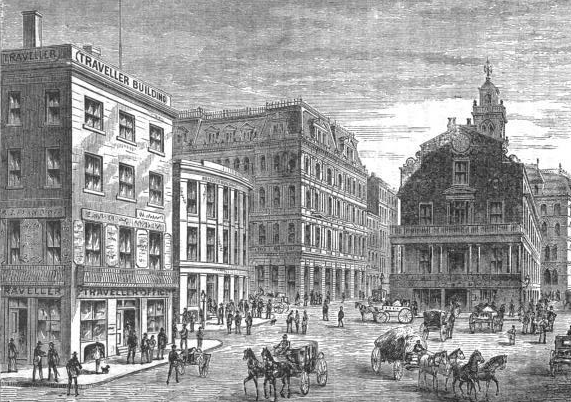
Traveller building in 1886 on State Street in Boston

During Worthington's tenure as publisher, the Evening Traveller became the first Boston paper to employ newspaper hawkers to sell papers in the streets rather than rely solely on subscriptions; and was the first paper in Boston to use headline posters to advertise papers. Compared to other papers in Boston in the 1840s, the Traveller was notable for its significantly lower retail price. The Evening Traveller's first office was located at 47 Court Street. It later relocated to the Old State House before moving into its own building at 31 State Street. Under Worthington's leadership, the paper supported the views of the Free Soil Party and the later Republican Party. The paper's shift to the Republican Party led to the departure of Ferdinand Andrews, who supported Daniel Webster and the Cotton Whigs. Andrews was replaced as managing editor by twenty-two year old Manton Marble. In 1857, Samuel Bowles joined the paper. Marble and Bowles were unable to work together and Marble left for New York City. Bowles took over as managing editor on April 13, 1857, and soon thereafter merged the Evening Traveller with the Boston Atlas, the Boston Bee, and the Independent Chronicle. The merger was a failure and placed the paper in debt. Bowles left the Evening Traveler without notice on August 10, 1857, and returned to Springfield, Massachusetts. Bowles was succeeded by Joseph B. Morss. In 1859 Morss was succeeded by Reuben Crooke. As of 1878, one guide described the Evening Traveller as "the largest four-page evening paper in New England: five editions daily; the semi-weekly and weekly of each week contains sermons of Henry Ward Beecher; 'Review of the Week;' market and shipping reports; latest news and choice reading, prepared expressly for the family fireside." In 1879, reporter James W. Clarke became the paper's managing editor. He remained with the Evening Traveller until 1885, when he accepted the position of chief of editorial writers for The Boston Globe. From 1885 to 1891, W. F. Whitcher served as editor in chief. Whitcher was succeeded by Albert Edward Winship. Roland Worthington sold the paper in June 1891. The new owners replaced Winship as editor, bringing back Reuben Crooke.

=== Later years ===
In the 1900s, the paper was headquartered at 76 Summer Street (c. 1902–1912). In 1912 the Herald bought the Traveler and merged the papers into the Boston Traveler and Evening Herald, now published from the Herald's facility at 171 Tremont Street. From 1914 to 1918, future Territory of Alaska Governor and U.S. Senator Ernest Gruening served as the paper's managing editor. In 1928, the new owners moved the paper away from Republican politics by dropping the editorial page and replacing it with a "People's Forum". The morning Herald and the evening Traveler were published until 1967, when, due to declining circulation, they were combined into a morning newspaper known as the Herald-Traveler.

== Variant titles ==
Dailies

- Daily Evening Traveller, 1845–1885
- Boston Evening Traveller, 1885–1889
- Boston Daily Traveller, c. 1856–1885, 1889–1894
- Boston Traveler, 1894–1912, 1914–1967
- Boston Traveler and Evening Herald, 1912–1914

Non-dailies

- American Traveller (semiweekly and weekly editions), c. 1845–1885
- American Semi-Weekly Traveller, 1851–1854
- Boston Traveller (semiweekly edition), c. 1855–1885
- American Weekly Traveller, c. 1851–1855

== Images ==
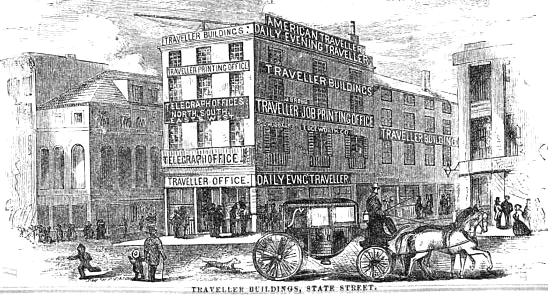
Traveller building, State Street, 1850s

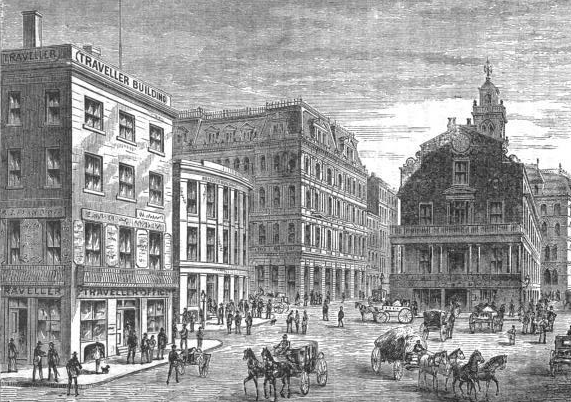
Traveller building, near Old State House, ca.1880s

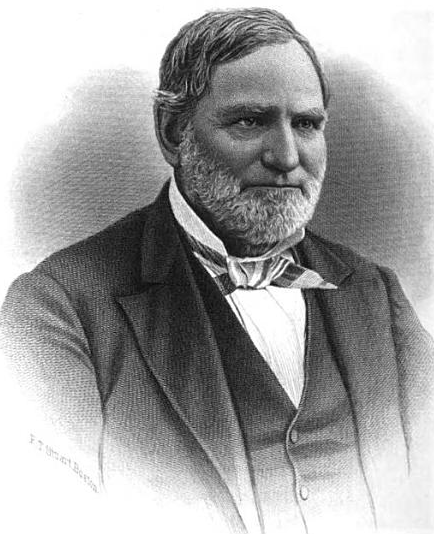
Portrait of Roland Worthington, publisher

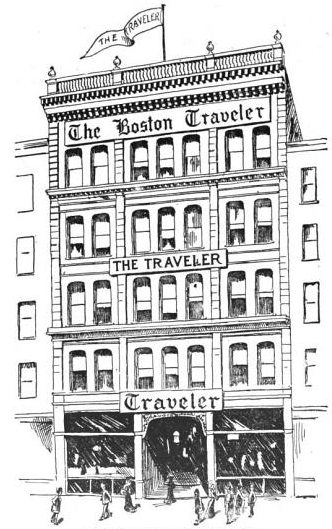
Traveler building, Summer Street, 1902

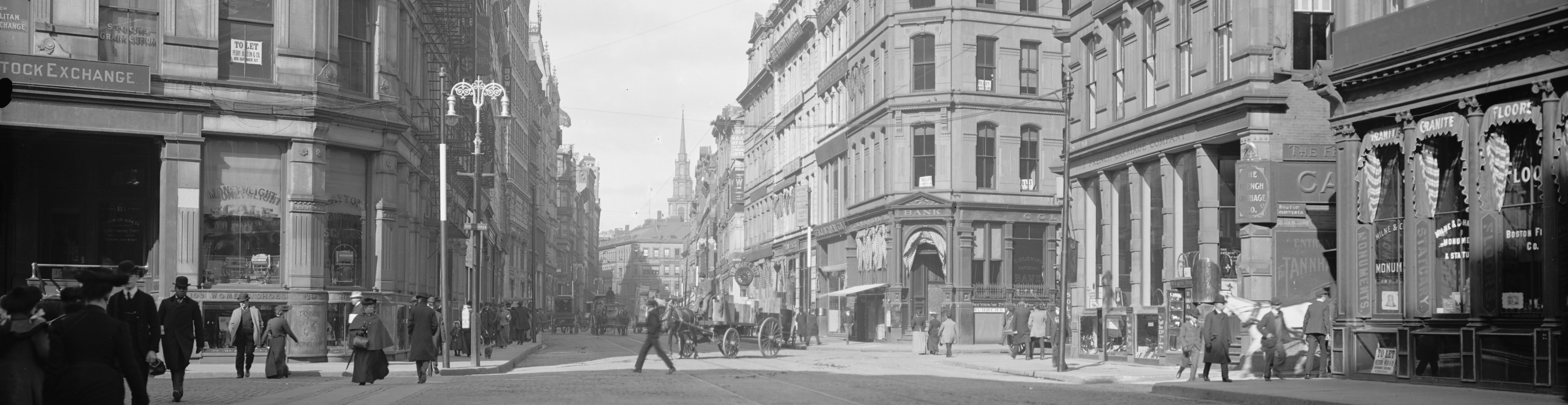
Summer Street, 1904

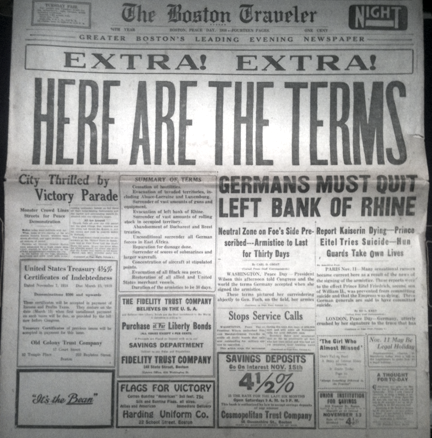
Boston Traveler, 1918
