= William Davis Taylor =

American newspaper executive

- Taylor in 1967
- Born: April 2, 1908; Boston, Massachusetts, US
- Died: February 19, 2002 (aged 93); Brookline, Massachusetts, US
- Education: Harvard University
- Known for: Publisher of The Boston Globe
- Spouse(s): Mary Hammond (d. 1947); Ann C. Macy
- Children: 6, including William O. Taylor II
- Father: William O. Taylor
- Relatives: Charles H. Taylor (grandfather)
- Awards: Elijah Parish Lovejoy Award (1975)

William Davis Taylor (April 2, 1908 – February 19, 2002) was an American newspaper executive who was publisher of The Boston Globe from 1955 to 1977.

== Biography ==
Taylor was born in Boston, was educated at Noble and Greenough School in Dedham, Massachusetts, and was a 1931 graduate of Harvard University. Taylor had two children with his first wife, who died in 1947, and four children with his second wife.

Taylor followed his paternal grandfather, Charles H. Taylor, and father, William O. Taylor, as publisher of The Boston Globe. He was the third of five members of the Taylor family who led the paper from 1873 to 1999.

Taylor was the first publisher of the Globe to appoint an editor in 75 years, naming Laurence L. Winship to the role in 1955. During Taylor's time as publisher, the Globe made its first political endorsement, supporting Kevin White in the 1967 Boston mayoral election. The Globe also became one of the first newspapers to call for the United States to withdraw from the Vietnam War, and one of the first newspapers to call for the resignation of President Richard Nixon. The Globe won 11 Pulitzer Prizes during Taylor's tenure. It was also during Taylor's time as publisher that the Globe became a public company for the first time in its history, under the name Affiliated Publications in 1973.

Upon his retirement at the end of 1977, he was succeeded as publisher by his son William O. Taylor II. Taylor died at his home in Brookline, Massachusetts, in 2002 at age 93.

| Preceded by William O. Taylor | Publisher of The Boston Globe; 1955–1977 | Succeeded by William O. Taylor II |
