= Thomas Winship =

American journalist

- Winship in 1968
- Born: July 1, 1920; Cambridge, Massachusetts, U.S.
- Died: March 14, 2002 (aged 81); Boston, Massachusetts, U.S.
- Education: Belmont Hill School
- Alma mater: Harvard University
- Occupations: Journalist, editor
- Employer: The Boston Globe
- Spouse: Elizabeth Coolidge Winship
- Children: 4
- Father: Laurence L. Winship
- Awards: Elijah Parish Lovejoy Award (1984)

Thomas Winship (July 1, 1920 – March 14, 2002) was an American journalist who served as editor of The Boston Globe from 1965 until 1984.

== Biography ==
Winship was born in Cambridge, Massachusetts, and soon after moved to Sudbury. He graduated from Belmont Hill School in 1938. He made the first ascent of Alaska's Mount Bertha in 1940, and founded the ski club at Harvard University. After graduating in 1942, he worked as a laborer and then joined the United States Coast Guard. He served as a combat correspondent aboard a troop ship on D-Day. He continued working at Coast Guard headquarters in Washington, D.C., after the war, and got a second job writing obituaries for The Washington Post.

He was a police reporter at The Post when he was offered a job as press secretary to Senator Leverett Saltonstall, a Massachusetts Republican. The experience led Winship to become a Democrat. He returned to The Post for six years before becoming Washington correspondent for The Boston Globe. In 1958 he went back to Boston as the newspaper's metropolitan editor, then managing editor.

Winship was born into a newspaper tradition. His paternal grandfather, Albert Edward Winship, was an editor of the Journal of Education. His father, Laurence L. Winship, joined The Boston Globe in 1912, became managing editor in 1937, and was named editor in 1955. Winship succeeded his father as editor in 1965, and held the position until retiring in 1984.

Winship helped raise the Globe to the highest ranks and guided it to 12 Pulitzer Prizes as a result of the Globe's opposition to the Vietnam War and coverage of school desegregation in the 1970s. The Pulitzers won under his leadership, beginning in 1966, were the first in Globe history.

After his retirement, Winship was the first senior fellow at the Gannett Center for Media Studies (now the Freedom Forum) and the founding chairman of the Center for Foreign Journalists.

At the time of his death, Winship was being treated for lymphoma at Massachusetts General Hospital in Boston. He was survived by his wife, Elizabeth Coolidge Winship (author of the syndicated "Ask Beth" advice column), sister Joanna Crawford, sons Laurence and Benjamin, daughters Margaret and Joanna, and eight grandchildren.

Preceded by Laurence L. Winship	Editor of The Boston Globe; 1965–1984	Succeeded by Michael C. Janeway
