= Cyrus Wakefield =

American manufacturing executive (1811–1873)

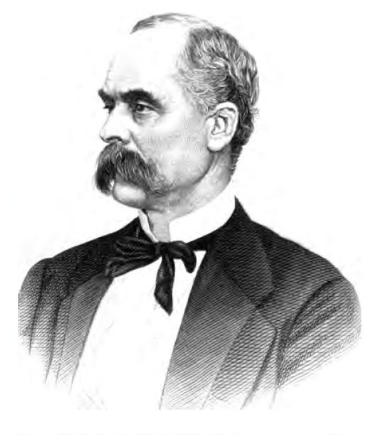
- Born: February 7, 1811; Roxbury, New Hampshire
- Died: October 26, 1873 (aged 62); Wakefield, Massachusetts
- Occupation: Manufacturing executive
- Known for: Wakefield Rattan Company

Cyrus Wakefield (February 7, 1811 – October 26, 1873) was a manufacturer of rattan furniture and carriage bodies, and the founder of the Wakefield Rattan Company, the largest manufacturer of rattan products at the time. The town of Wakefield, Massachusetts, is named for him.

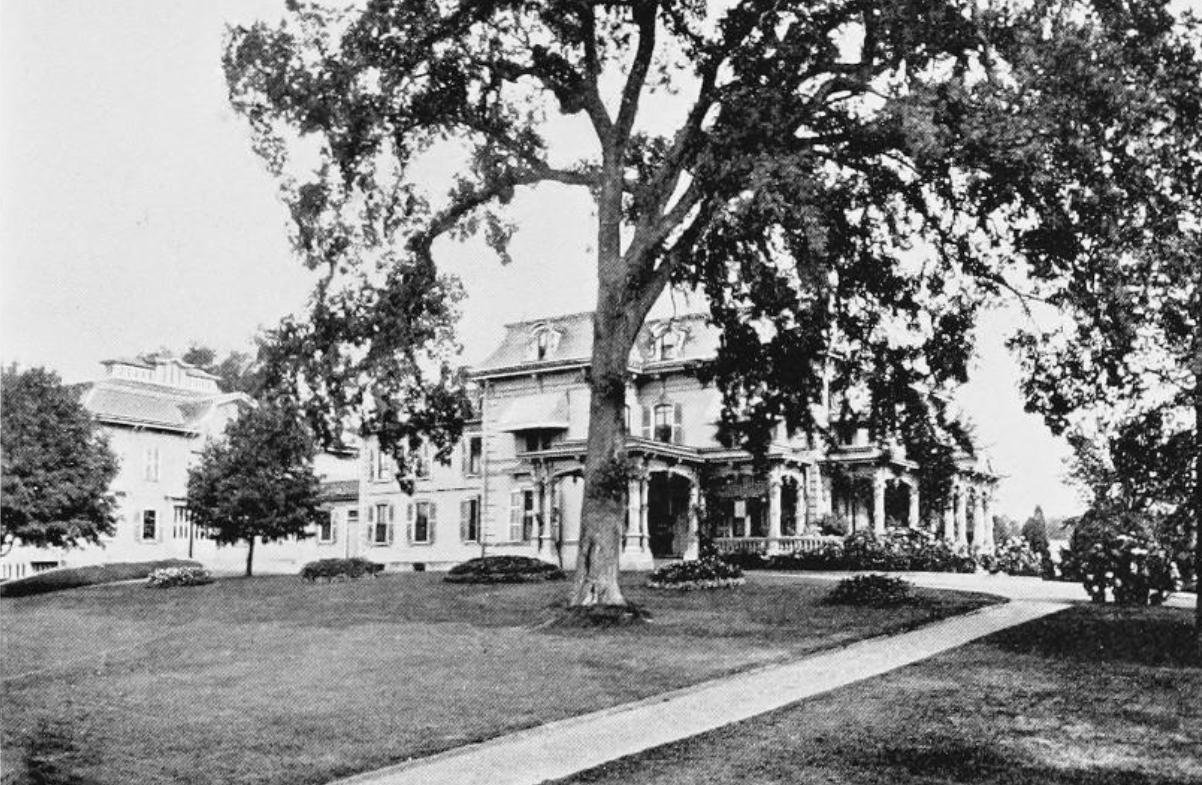
Cyrus Wakefield Mansion, Main Street, Wakefield, Massachusetts

== Biography ==
About 1827, Wakefield went to Boston, where he engaged in trade. He originated the rattan business in the United States, and discovered several methods of utilizing the rattan waste, while of the split rattans he made furniture and carriage bodies. He established a large factory—the Wakefield Rattan Company—for these manufactures in South Reading, Massachusetts, where his rattan works covered 7 acres (2.8 ha) of ground.

In 1868, South Reading voted to change its name to Wakefield, in recognition of his benefactions, particularly the gift of a town hall that cost $100,000. He also gave $100,000 to Harvard University, and left other large philanthropic bequests.

In 1869, Wakefield and other business leaders petitioned and received a charter to open a savings bank that would serve the resident population of the town of Wakefield, numbering just over 4,000 people. The bank was chartered as the Wakefield Savings Bank, and was renamed to "The Savings Bank" in 1989 to reflect its broader geographic footprint.

In 1872, Wakefield was one of a small group of Boston business executives who raised funds to start The Boston Globe. The following year, Wakefield lost his fortune during the Panic of 1873. Wakefield died at his home in the town of Wakefield on October 26, 1873.
