= Edwin C. Bailey =

American newspaper editor and postmaster (1816–1890)

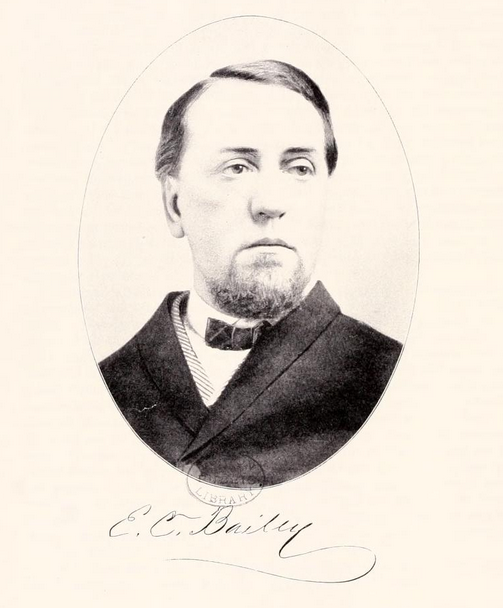
- Bailey, c. 1858
- Born: Edwin Curtis Bailey; June 10, 1816; Albany, New York, U.S.
- Died: August 19, 1890 (aged 74); Quincy, Massachusetts, U.S.
- Resting place: Forest Hills Cemetery; Boston, Massachusetts, U.S.
- Occupations: Newspaper editor; postmaster
- Employers: Boston Herald; The Boston Globe

Edwin Curtis Bailey (June 10, 1816 – August 19, 1890) was an American newspaper editor and postmaster.

== Biography ==
Bailey was born on June 10, 1816, in Albany, New York. He served as the postmaster of Boston from 1853 to 1857, and was a commander of the Ancient and Honorable Artillery Company of Massachusetts.

Bailey later was the owner and editor of the Boston Herald, until he sold the newspaper in 1869. He subsequently moved to New Hampshire and became publisher of the Concord Patriot in Concord. In 1878, Bailey was hired by Charles H. Taylor to be editor of The Boston Globe, a position he held until 1880.

Bailey died as the result of a train wreck in Quincy, Massachusetts, on August 19, 1890. He was buried in Forest Hills Cemetery in the Jamaica Plain neighborhood of Boston.

Preceded by Edwin M. Bacon	Editor of The Boston Globe; 1878–1880	Succeeded by Charles H. Taylor
