= George Punchard =

American editor and clergyman

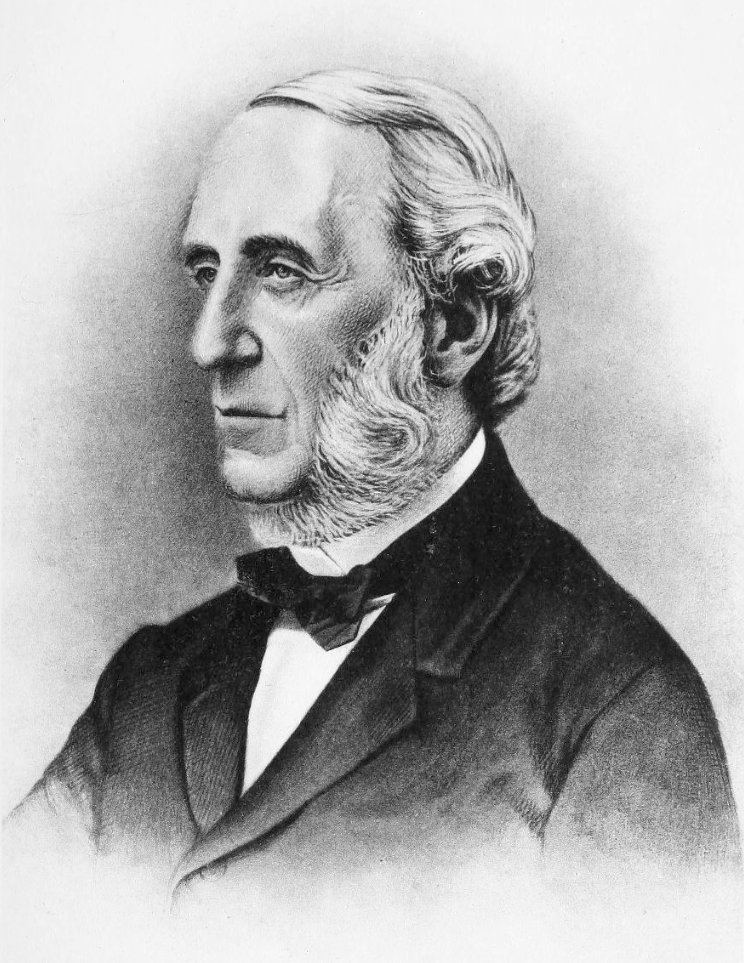
- Born: June 7, 1806; Salem, Massachusetts
- Died: April 2, 1880 (aged 73); Boston, Massachusetts
- Education: Dartmouth College; Andover Theological Seminary
- Occupations: Editor, clergyman
- Spouse: Williamine Poole (m. 1830; died 1877)

George Punchard (June 7, 1806 – April 2, 1880) was a New England editor and Congregational clergyman.

== Biography ==
George Punchard was born in Salem, Massachusetts on June 7, 1806. His father, John (1763–1857), served in the Continental Army during the American Revolutionary War. George graduated from Dartmouth College in 1826, and from Andover Theological Seminary in 1829. From 1830 until 1844, he was pastor of a Congregational church in Plymouth, New Hampshire.

He married Williamine Poole on July 6, 1830. She died in 1877.

He died from bronchial disease in Boston on April 2, 1880.

== Literary activities ==
Punchard was associate editor and proprietor of the Boston Traveler, of which he was also a founder, from 1845 until 1857, and again from 1867 until 1871. He was secretary of the New England branch of the American Tract Society. He wrote:

- View of Congregationalism (Andover, 1850)
- History of Congregationalism from A. D. 250 to 1616 (1841; 2d ed., 3 vols., New York, 1865–67)
