= Elizabeth Winship =

American journalist and advice columnist

- Born: Elizabeth Coolidge; May 17, 1921; Pittsfield, Massachusetts, US
- Died: October 23, 2011 (aged 90); Roseville, Minnesota, US
- Education: Vassar College; Radcliffe College
- Occupations: Journalist, advice columnist
- Years active: 1952–1998
- Employer: The Boston Globe
- Known for: "Ask Beth" advice column
- Spouse: Thomas Winship

Elizabeth Winship (May 17, 1921 – October 23, 2011) was an American journalist, best known for writing the syndicated advice column "Ask Beth."

== Early life ==
Elizabeth Coolidge was born in Pittsfield, Massachusetts, on May 17, 1921, to Albert Sprague and Margaret Stewart (Coit) Coolidge. She grew up in Cambridge, Massachusetts, and attended Vassar College from 1939 to 1941, transferring to Radcliffe College, and graduating from there with a B.S. in psychology in 1943. When she was a junior at Radcliffe, she met Thomas Winship, a senior at Harvard College and her future husband. After she graduated from Radcliffe, she pursued her interest in psychology through her own research and soon began raising a family of four children—Margaret (Peg), Laurence, Joanna, and Benjamin.

== Professional life ==
=== The Boston Globe ===
In 1952, Elizabeth Winship was hired as a book reviewer by The Boston Globe. In the early 1960s, she also worked as a children's book editor for the newspaper. In 1963, a Globe editor suggested that Winship start an advice column for teenagers, which was called "Ask Beth." The column found early success due to Winship's open and honest advice and in 1970 the Los Angeles Times Syndicate picked up the column. At its peak, it was syndicated in 70 newspapers. By the 1980s, her daughter Peg Winship, who had become a family therapist, assisted her mother in writing responses. Peg continued the column on her own from her mother's retirement in 1998 until February 27, 2007.

=== Publications ===
As with her column, Winship addressed various health and sexuality issues, particularly for adolescents, in her many publications. She authored or contributed to Ask Beth: You Can't Ask Your Mother (1972), Ask Beth: Questions and Answers About the Things that Concern Girls (1972), Masculinity and Femininity (1978), Reaching Your Teenager (1983), Human Sexuality (1988), The Parents' Guide to Risky Times: A Companion to Jeanne Blake's Risky Times (1990), Risky Times: How to be AIDS-Smart and Stay Healthy: A Guide to Teenagers (1990), Human Sexuality (Heath Perspectives on Health) (1996), Perspectives on Health Human Sexuality: Annotated Teacher's Edition (1996), and I'm Pregnant, Now What Do I Do? (1997).

=== Awards and recognition ===
In 1978, Winship received a Humanitarian Award for outstanding contributions in promoting human welfare from the Massachusetts Psychological Association. In 1980, she was honored with the Matrix Award from the Boston Professional chapter of Women in Communications, Inc., in recognition of her contributions to the development of adolescents. In 1982, the Massachusetts Association of School Psychologists recognized presented her with the Journalist of the Year Award, and the Parent Counseling Association of New England made her an honorary member in 1984. In 1998, the Boston Women Communicators honored her with its Legacy Award in recognition of her impact as a role model and successful career woman in communications. From 1980 through 1984, Winship was a member of the advisory committee for the Schlesinger Library at Radcliffe College, Harvard University. In 1988, she received the Radcliffe College Distinguished Alumnae Award.
