= Benjamin B. Taylor =

American newspaper executive

- Born: 1946 or 1947 (age 79–80); Natick, Massachusetts, U.S.
- Education: Harvard College
- Known for: Publisher of The Boston Globe
- Spouse: Katherine
- Children: 3
- Relatives: John I. Taylor (grandfather), Charles H. Taylor (great-grandfather)

Benjamin B. Taylor (born c. 1947) is an American former journalist and newspaper executive who served as publisher of The Boston Globe from 1997 to 1999, the fifth and final member of the Taylor family to oversee the Globe during a 126-year period.

== Biography ==
Taylor was born in Natick, Massachusetts, and graduated from Harvard College. His father was John Ingalls Taylor (1911–1987), a former president of The Boston Globe. John Ingalls Taylor was a son of John Irving Taylor, (Note: Some sources refer to John Ingalls Taylor as John I. Taylor Jr.) owner of the Boston Red Sox in the early 20th century and youngest son of the first Globe publisher, Charles H. Taylor.

Taylor joined the Globe in 1972 and held various roles including general assignment reporter, consumer affairs reporter, and assistant business editor. As of mid-1987, Taylor was assistant executive editor at the Globe, and in January 1988 he became executive editor. He was made a vice-president of the newspaper in March 1991, and was an executive vice president by February 1992. In 1993, the Globe was sold to The New York Times Company, and Taylor became president of the paper. In December 1996, the Globe announced that Taylor would succeed his second cousin William O. Taylor II, who was retiring, as publisher effective April 1, 1997.

Taylor served as publisher of the Globe until July 1999, when he was succeeded by Richard H. Gilman, a senior vice-president of The New York Times. The New York Times Company cited a "difference in approach to management" for the change. Taylor continued at the Globe for several months as chairman of the board, until tendering his resignation in December 1999, effective January 13, 2000.

In his later years, Taylor has served on the board of several non-profit and environmental organizations, including The Conversation, a network of not-for-profit media outlets that publish news stories on the Internet that are written by academics and researchers. He is currently the Chairman of the Board of the Emerald Necklace Conservancy, which works to restore and improve the Boston area's Emerald Necklace park system for all.

== Notes ==
Preceded by William O. Taylor II	Publisher of The Boston Globe; 1997–1999	Succeeded by Richard H. Gilman
