= The Savings Bank =

State-chartered mutual bank headquartered in Wakefield, Massachusetts

- Formerly: Wakefield Savings Bank (1989)
- Type: Bank
- Industry: Financial services
- Founded: 1869
- Headquarters: Wakefield, Massachusetts, United States
- Number of locations: 9 branches (2025)
- Area served: Lawrence, Andover, Lynnfield, Melrose, Methuen, Middleton, North Reading, Reading, Saugus, Stoneham, Wakefield, Wilmington
- Key people: Raichelle L. Kallery (CEO); Craig J.MacKenzie (COO); Denise Carbone (CFO)
- Products: Savings; checking; consumer loans; mortgages; online banking
- Total assets: ▲US$ 870M (2026)
- Number of employees: 119 (2025)
- Subsidiaries: Wakefield Bancorp, MHC First Financial Trust, N.A.
- Website: tsbdirect.bank

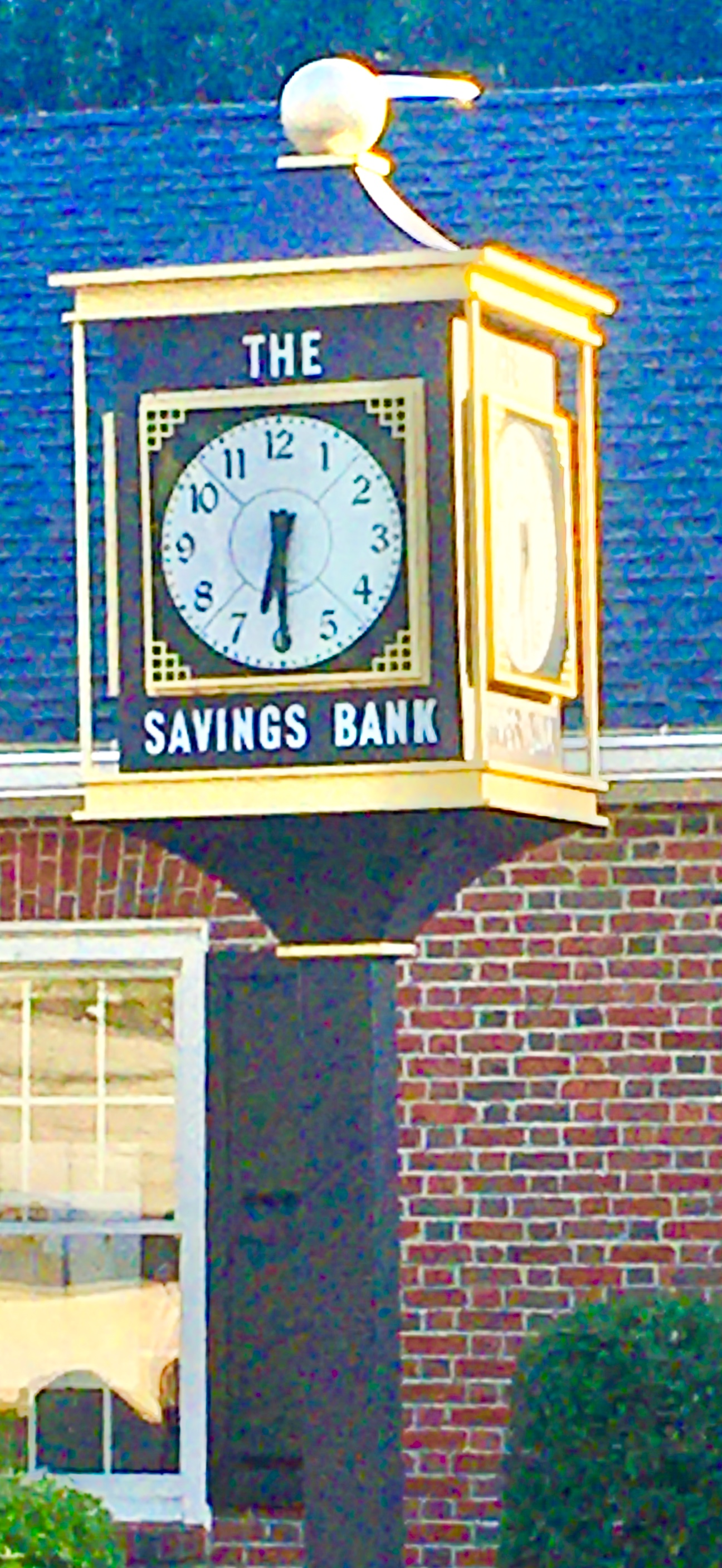
The The Savings Bank branch in the Greenwood district of Wakefield, Massachusetts, in July 2021.

The Savings Bank (formerly Wakefield Savings Bank) is a state-chartered mutual bank headquartered in Wakefield, Massachusetts, and founded in 1869. It is among the oldest banks in the United States. The Savings Bank has over $870 million in assets, nine branches, and operates in Wakefield, Lynnfield, Andover, Methuen, North Reading, and surrounding communities in eastern Massachusetts. It is a wholly owned subsidiary of Wakefield Bancorp, MHC.

== History ==
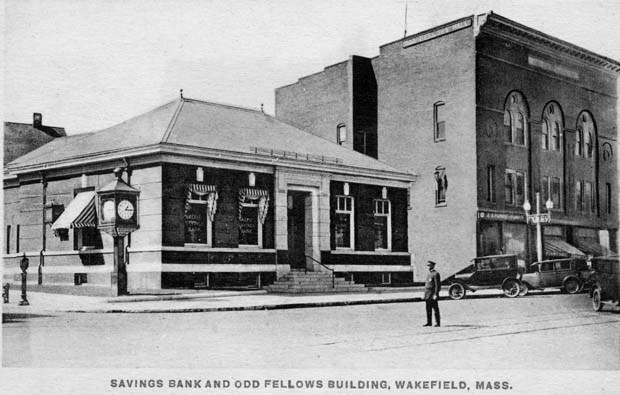
Postcard showing the Wakefield Savings Bank building at the corner of Main and Chestnut Streets. Year of 1895.

Wakefield Savings Bank was established in 1869 when Cyrus Wakefield and other business leaders petitioned for a state charter to open a savings bank in Wakefield, Massachusetts. By 1871, the bank had over $60,000 in deposits and more than 500 depositors.

In 1981, Wakefield Savings Bank opened the first student-operated bank branch in the United States, named the 1st Educational Savings Branch at Wakefield Memorial High School.

In 1989, Wakefield Savings Bank changed its name to The Savings Bank in 1989 to reflect its increased geographic scope. In 2005, The Savings Bank acquired First Financial Trust, N.A.

On April 30, 2013, the institution transitioned into a mutual holding company, Wakefield Bancorp, MHC, with a mid-tier holding company named Wakefield Bancorp, Inc.

== Community involvement ==
In 2001, The Savings Bank established the Donald E. Garrant Foundation, Inc. in memory of Don Garrant, former president and chief executive officer of The Savings Bank. The foundation supports projects in public and private schools, grades K-12, and non-profit organizations that promote financial education in saving, investing, borrowing and credit, and economics.
