= William O. Taylor =

American newspaper executive

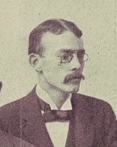
- Born: January 8, 1871; Nashua, New Hampshire, U.S.
- Died: July 15, 1955 (aged 84); Marion, Massachusetts, U.S.
- Education: Boston Latin School
- Alma mater: Harvard College
- Known for: Publisher of The Boston Globe
- Spouse: Mary Moseley (d. 1944)
- Children: 5, including William Davis Taylor
- Father: Charles H. Taylor
- Relatives: John I. Taylor (brother)

William Osgood Taylor (January 8, 1871 – July 15, 1955) was an American newspaper executive who served as publisher of The Boston Globe from 1921 to 1955.

== Biography ==
Taylor was born in 1871 in Nashua, New Hampshire, attended Boston Latin School, and was an 1893 graduate of Harvard College. Taylor and Mary Moseley (1873–1944) were married in 1894, and had two sons and three daughters. Residing primarily in Boston, the family maintained a summer home on Buzzards Bay. In later life, Taylor resided in Marion, Massachusetts.

Taylor's father was Charles H. Taylor, founder of The Boston Globe. Upon the elder Taylor's death in 1921, the younger Taylor became the second publisher of the Globe. A brother, John I. Taylor, is best remembered as owner of the Boston Red Sox from 1904 to 1914, while another brother, Charles H. Taylor Jr., was also an executive at the Globe.

Taylor served as publisher until his death in 1955. His son William Davis Taylor then became the third publisher of the Globe. A grandson and namesake, William O. Taylor II, would also serve as publisher from 1978 to 1997.

Preceded by Charles H. Taylor	Publisher of The Boston Globe; 1921–1955	Succeeded by William Davis Taylor
Preceded by Charles H. Taylor	Editor of The Boston Globe; 1921–1955	Succeeded by Laurence L. Winship
