= Brian McGrory =

American journalist (born 1961)

- Born: November 30, 1961 (age 64); Boston, Massachusetts, U.S.
- Education: Bates College
- Occupations: Journalist, author, editor
- Employer(s): The Boston Globe (1989–2022; 2026–present); Boston University (2023–25),

Brian McGrory (born November 30, 1961) is an American journalist, author and publishing executive serving as editor of The Boston Globe since January 2026. He was previously the Globe's editor from December 2012 to December 2022. From 2023 to 2025, he chaired the department of journalism at Boston University.

== Biography ==
McGrory was born in Boston, and grew up in Roslindale and Weymouth, Massachusetts. He graduated from Bates College in Lewiston, Maine, with a Bachelor of Arts degree in 1984. He began his journalism career with the New Haven Register and The Patriot Ledger.

McGrory joined The Boston Globe in 1989 as a Metro columnist, and quickly moved up the ranks to associate editor. He has served as a White House reporter, and has written four novels plus a memoir. In 2011, he received a Scripps-Howard award for commentary and a Sigma Delta Chi Award for column writing.

McGrory was named editor of the Globe in December 2012, succeeding Martin Baron. His staff won a Pulitzer Prize for Breaking News Reporting in 2014 for coverage of the Boston Marathon bombing in 2013.

In 2018, former Globe editor Hilary Sargent accused McGrory of sexual harassment by sending her an inappropriate text while McGrory was overseeing her work. McGrory denied the allegation, and an internal investigation cleared him of wrongdoing.

On September 7, 2022, McGrory announced he would step down as editor of The Boston Globe at the end of the year to become chair of Boston University's journalism department. In a statement to BU Today, Boston University College of Communication Dean Mariette DiChristina praised McGrory's leadership and vision. “He [Brian] brings high standards, an innovative approach to newsrooms going through change, and a deep commitment to diversity, equity, and inclusion.” In 2025, DiChristina granted McGrory a leave of absence to return to the Globe on a temporary basis as its editor, replacing Nancy Barnes. In an email to students, McGrory wrote that he planned to be back at BU “sometime in 2027” or possibly sooner.

In February 2026, Boston University's student newspaper The Daily Free Press reported that DiChristina had exchanged emails in 2014 and 2015 with convicted sex offender Jeffrey Epstein. These emails, released by the United States Department of Justice under the Epstein Files Transparency Act, showed that DiChristina and Epstein made plans for an in-person meeting in Manhattan in July 2014 and scheduled phone calls. DiChristina also asked Epstein to attend an editorial meeting at Scientific American. All of this communication occurred after Epstein had pleaded guilty in 2008 to soliciting a minor for prostitution and registered as a sex offender. DiChristina's associations with Epstein were reported in multiple campus, local, and national publications in the days following the file release. The Globe, under McGrory's renewed direction, reported new information revealed in the files about Epstein's connections with other prominent Boston-area academic leaders, including Lawrence Summers, Martin Nowak, George Church, and Moche Hoffman, but did not report about DiChristina's ties.

In a September 10, 2026, memo to Globe staff, McGrory announced his permanent resignation from Boston University, writing, “After discussions with Dhiraj [Nayar, president of Boston Globe Media], Linda [Henry, Globe Media’s CEO], and Mariette DiChristina, the dean at BU, this seemed to be the right thing to do.”

McGrory serves on the board of The Venetoulis Institute for Local Journalism, publisher of The Baltimore Banner. McGrory currently serves as the publication's interim editor.

== Bibliography ==
=== Jack Flynn Series ===
1. The Incumbent (2000, ISBN 0-7434-0350-9)
2. The Nominee (2002, ISBN 0-7434-0353-3)
3. Dead Line (2004, ISBN 0-7434-6366-8)
4. Strangled (2007, ISBN 0-7434-6368-4)

=== Other ===
1. Buddy: How a Rooster Made Me a Family Man (2013, ISBN 0-3079-5307-6)

Preceded by Martin Baron	Editor of The Boston Globe; 2012–2022	Succeeded by Nancy Barnes
