= George Parker Winship =

American librarian (1871–1952)

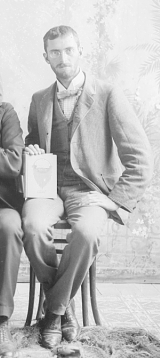
- Born: July 29, 1871; Bridgewater
- Died: June 22, 1952; Dover
- Education: Harvard University
- Occupations: Librarian, bibliographer
- Father: Albert Edward Winship

George Parker Winship (July 29, 1871 – June 22, 1952) was an American librarian, author, teacher, and bibliographer born in Bridgewater, Massachusetts. He graduated from Harvard in 1893.

== Early life and career ==
Went from the Somerville Latin School to Harvard College, where he received an A.B cum laude in 1893 and an A.M. in 1894. He was librarian of a private collection of Americana formed by John Carter Brown at Providence, Rhode Island, from 1895 to 1915. Winship's interest in contemporary fine printing was to some extent connected with the Club of Odd Volumes in Boston, of which he became a non-resident member in 1898. Winship was also elected a member of the American Antiquarian Society in 1899.

In 1915 Winship became librarian of the Harry Elkins Widener collection, which had just opened. He was also appointed a lecturer on the history of printing and championed the use of rare books in education. In 1926, he became Assistant Librarian of Widener's Treasure Room, which held Harvard's most precious rare books and manuscripts. Winship remained at Harvard until his retirement in 1936; he died in 1952.

Winship was a scholar and as a librarian. He edited a number of historical works and published: The Coronado Expedition (1896); John Cabot (1898); Geoffrey Chaucer (1900); Cabot Bibliography (1900); William Caxton (1909); Printing in South America (1912); and The John Carter Brown Library (1914).

He was a Rosenbach Fellow in Bibliography at the University of Pennsylvania.

Winship's father was American educator Albert Edward Winship; a brother was The Boston Globe editor Laurence L. Winship.

== Publications ==
- The Coronado Expedition 1540-1542 (1896)
- John Cabot (1898)
- The Careers of the Cabots. An Essay (1900)
- Geoffrey Chaucer (1900)
- Cabot Bibliography (1900)
- Boston in 1682 and 1699; A Trip to New England by Edward Ward and a Letter from New England by J.W. (1905)
- Sailors Narratives of Voyages Along the New England Coast, 1524-1624 (1905)
- Early South American Newspapers (1908)
- William Caxton (1909)
- Printing in South America (1912)
- The John Carter Brown Library (1914)
- Luther S. Livingstone 1864-1914 (1915)
- The First Harvard Playwright: A Bibliography of the Restoration Dramatist John Crowne (1922)
- The Eliot Indian Tracts (1925)
- Gutenberg to Plantin: An Outline of the Early History of Printing (1926)
- A Chronological List of the Books Printed at the Kelmscott Press (1928)
- The Merrymount Press of Boston (1929)
- The First American Bible: A Leaf from a Copy of the Bible Translated into the Indian Language by John Eliot and Printed at Cambridge in New England in the Year 1663 (1929)
- William Caxton & His Work (1937)
- Printing in the Fifteenth Century (1940)
- The Cambridge Press 1638-1692 (1945)
- Daniel Berkeley Updike and the Merrymount Press of Boston Massachusetts, 1860-1894-1941 (1947)
