= Edwin Munroe Bacon =

American writer and editor (1844–1916)

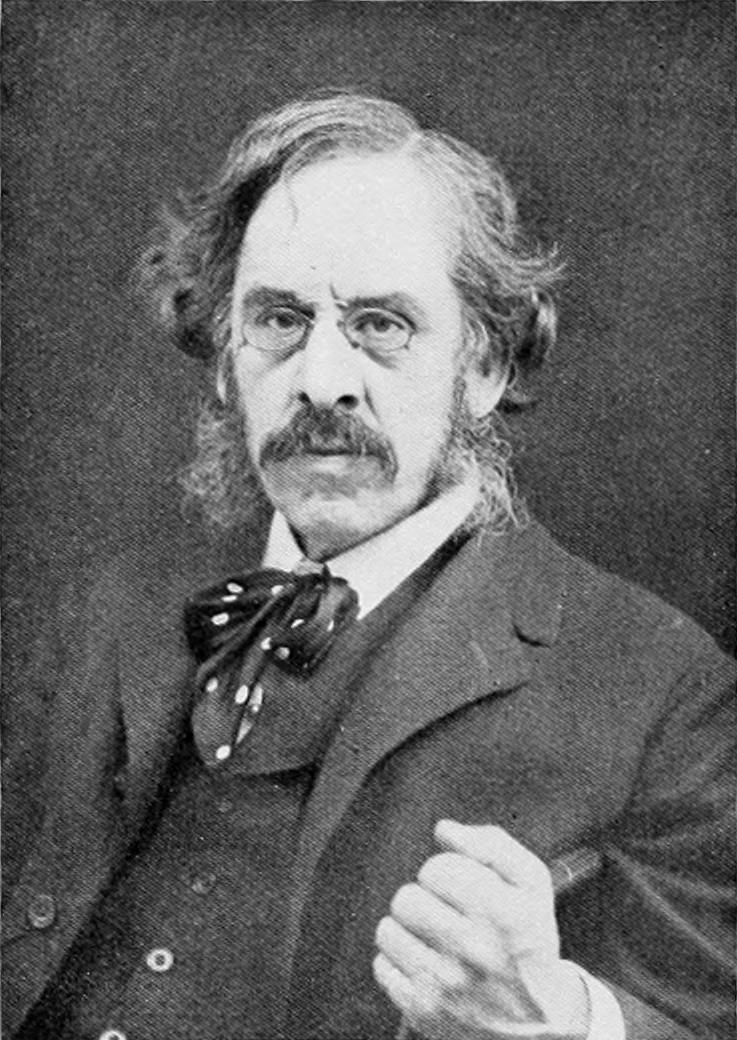
- Bacon, c. 1896
- Born: October 20, 1844; Providence, Rhode Island
- Died: February 24, 1916 (aged 71); Boston, Massachusetts
- Occupations: Newspaper editor and writer
- Spouse: Custa E. Hill
- Writing career
- Pen name: Taverner

Edwin Munroe Bacon (better known as, Edwin M. Bacon; pseudonym, Taverner; October 20, 1844 – February 24, 1916) was an American writer and editor who worked for the Boston Daily Advertiser and The Boston Globe and also wrote books about Boston, Massachusetts, and New England. His books include Bacon's Dictionary of Boston.

== Biography ==
Bacon was born on October 20, 1844, in Providence, Rhode Island. He was the son of Henry and Eliza Ann (Munroe) Bacon, and the brother of the painter Henry Bacon. He was of English and Scotch ancestry. His father, born in Boston, son of Robert Bacon, a native of Barnstable, of an early Cape Cod family, and prominent in his day as a manufacturer at Baconville (now part of Winchester), was a Universalist clergyman and editor, who died in Philadelphia when the son was 12 years old. His mother was a native of Lexington, Massachusetts, and two of her ancestors fought in the fight on Lexington Green. She was a descendant of William Munroe, from Scotland, settled in Lexington in 1660.

Bacon's early education was mainly attained in private schools in Providence, Philadelphia, and Boston. He finished his studies in an academy at Foxboro, Massachusetts, a private and boarding school, which flourished for many years under James L. Stone as principal, and which fitted many boys for college. Prepared for college, he determined not to enter, but at once to engage in the work of his chosen profession.

Bacon worked for the Boston Daily Advertiser (1863–1886, intermittently); Illustrated Chicago News (1864–1868); The New York Times (1868–1872); The Boston Globe (1873–1878); The Boston Post (1886–1891); The Time and the Hour (1897–1900). He sometimes wrote under the pen-name "Taverner."

In 1880, Dartmouth College awarded Bacon an honorary Master of Arts degree. He died on February 24, 1916, at his home in Boston; he was survived by his wife and a daughter. His body was cremated at Mount Auburn Cemetery, and his ashes were buried in Saco, Maine.

== Selected works ==
- Bacon's dictionary of Boston, with George Edward Ellis. Houghton, Mifflin and company, 1886.
- Boston illustrated: containing full descriptions of the city and its immediate suburbs, its public buildings and institutions, business edifices, parks and avenues, statues, harbor and islands, etc., etc., with Edward Stanwood. revised ed. Houghton, Mifflin and Co., 1886.
- Boston of to-day: a glance at its history and characteristics. With biographical sketches and portraits of many of its professional and business men, with Richard Herndon. Boston: Post Publishing Company, 1892.
- Historic pilgrimages in New England: among landmarks of Pilgrim and Puritan days and of the provincial and revolutionary periods. Silver, Burdett & Company, 1898.
- Walks and rides in the country round about Boston: covering thirty-six cities and towns, parks and public reservations, within a radius of twelve miles from the State house. Pub. for the Appalachian Mountain Club by Houghton, Mifflin and company, 1898.
- The Connecticut River and the Valley of the Connecticut. Historical and descriptive. G. P. Putnam's Sons, New York, 1906.
- "Gary's Magnetic Motor", Harper's New Monthly Magazine, Volume 0058 Issue 346, pages 601–605, 1879

Preceded by Maturin Murray Ballou	Editor of The Boston Globe; 1873–1878	Succeeded by Edwin C. Bailey
