= O'Cain Point =

Location of Nelson Island in the South Shetland Islands.

O'Cain Point (62°15′51″S 58°52′34″W) is a point lying 3 nautical miles (6 km) northwest of Duthoit Point on the east side of Nelson Island, in the South Shetland Islands. The name O'Cain's Island, after the American sealing vessel O'Cain (Captain Jonathan Winship) from Boston, MA, was applied by the Stonington sealers in 1820–21 to Nelson Island, but this name did not become established. O'Cain Point was applied by the United Kingdom Antarctic Place-Names Committee (UK-APC) in 1961 to preserve the American name in the area.
