= William O. Taylor II =

American newspaper executive

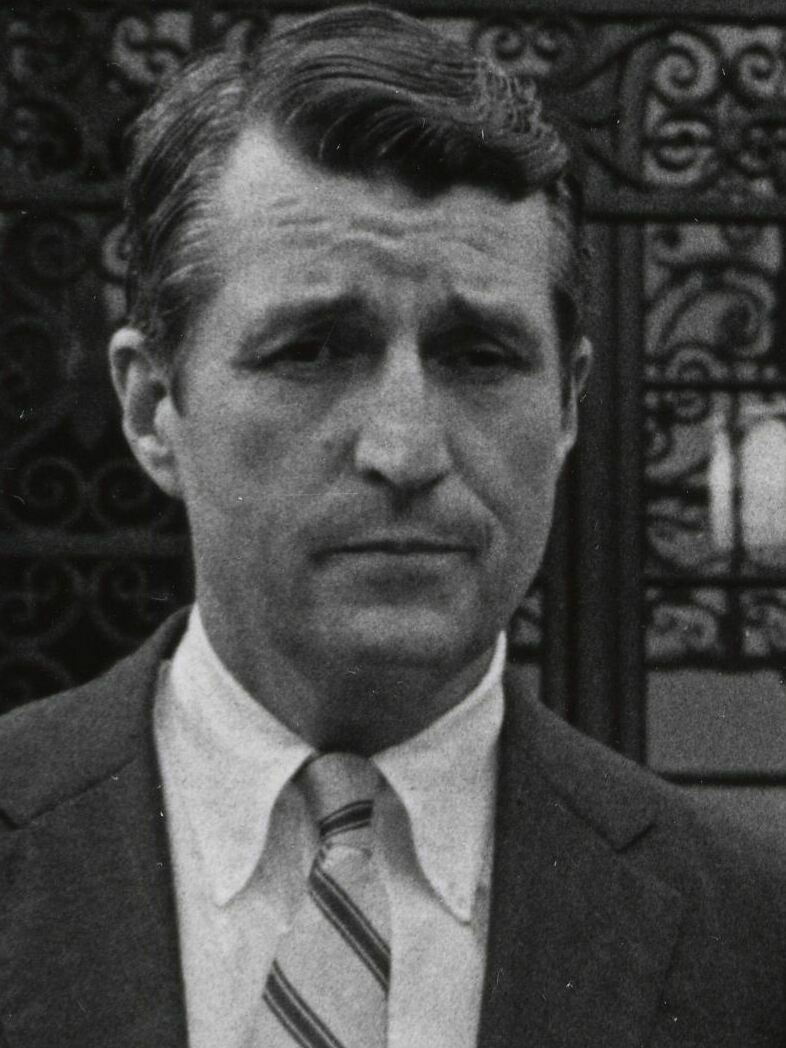
- Born: July 19, 1932; Boston, Massachusetts, US
- Died: May 1, 2011 (aged 78); Boston, Massachusetts, US
- Education: Harvard College
- Known for: Publisher of The Boston Globe
- Spouse: Sally Piper Coxe (m. 1959)
- Children: 3
- Father: William Davis Taylor
- Relatives: William O. Taylor (grandfather); Benjamin B. Taylor (second cousin)

William Osgood Taylor II (July 19, 1932 – May 1, 2011) was an American journalist and newspaper executive who served as publisher of The Boston Globe from 1978 to 1997, during which time the Globe was sold to The New York Times Company for $1.1 billion.

== Biography ==
Taylor attended Dexter School in Brookline, Massachusetts, and St. Paul's School in Concord, New Hampshire, before graduating from Harvard College in 1954. He then served two years in the United States Army, stationed in West Germany.

Taylor joined The Boston Globe at the urging of his father, publisher William Davis Taylor. After working in the classified advertising and promotions departments, he worked as a reporter before moving into management. Taylor was the fourth of five members of the Taylor family to run the Globe; he became publisher upon his father's retirement at the end of 1977. During his time as publisher, Taylor helped broker the 1993 sale of the Globe to The New York Times Company, and the paper was awarded nine Pulitzer Prizes. Upon his own retirement in 1997, Taylor was succeeded as publisher by his second cousin Benjamin B. Taylor, and took the title of chairman emeritus.

Taylor died in 2011 at his home in Boston from brain cancer.

Preceded by William Davis Taylor	Publisher of The Boston Globe; 1978–1997	Succeeded by Benjamin B. Taylor
