= John I. Taylor =

American baseball executive

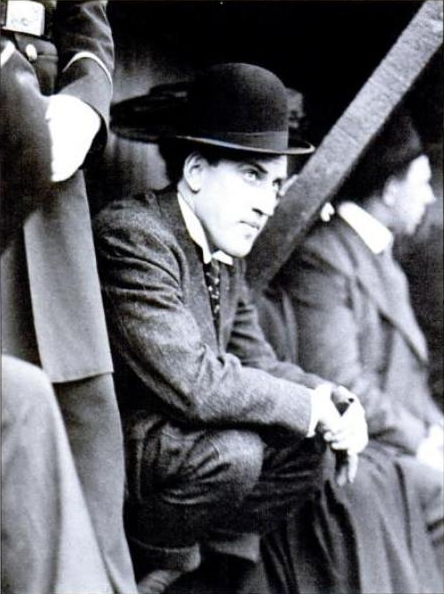
- Born: January 14, 1875; Somerville, Massachusetts, U.S.
- Died: January 26, 1938 (aged 63); Boston, Massachusetts, U.S.
- Resting place: Forest Hills Cemetery
- Known for: Owner of the Boston Red Sox
- Spouse: Daisy
- Father: Charles H. Taylor
- Relatives: William O. Taylor (brother)
- Awards: Boston Red Sox Hall of Fame (2012)

John Irving Taylor (January 14, 1875 – January 26, 1938) was an American baseball executive. He was principal owner of the Boston Red Sox from 1904 until 1911, (Note: Prior to 1908, the team was known as the Boston Americans.) and remained a part owner until 1914.

== Biography ==
Taylor was the son of Charles H. Taylor, publisher of The Boston Globe; a brother, William O. Taylor, would later succeed their father as publisher. John, William, and a third brother, Charles Jr., all worked for the Globe, although John's tenure was limited to several years after high school.

Taylor purchased the Red Sox from Henry Killilea on April 19, 1904, with his father Charles serving as a minority owner. In September 1911, the Taylors sold half of the stock in the team to Jimmy McAleer and Robert B. McRoy, with McAleer taking over as team president. During this time, the Red Sox won the 1912 World Series. On December 21, 1913, Joseph Lannin, Frank P. Cooper, and John R. Turner purchased McAleer and McRoy's half of the team with Lannin becoming team president. On May 15, 1914, Lannin bought out all of his partners and became sole owner of the Red Sox.

In his later years, Taylor lived in Dedham, Massachusetts, and died in hospital following a brief illness on January 26, 1938, aged 63. He is interred with his wife Daisy in Forest Hills Cemetery in Jamaica Plain, Massachusetts.

A son, John Ingalls Taylor, (Note: Some sources refer to John Ingalls Taylor as John I. Taylor Jr.) served as president of the Globe (1963–1975) and a grandson, Benjamin B. Taylor, served as president (1993–1997) and publisher (1997–1999). Taylor was inducted to the Boston Red Sox Hall of Fame in 2012.

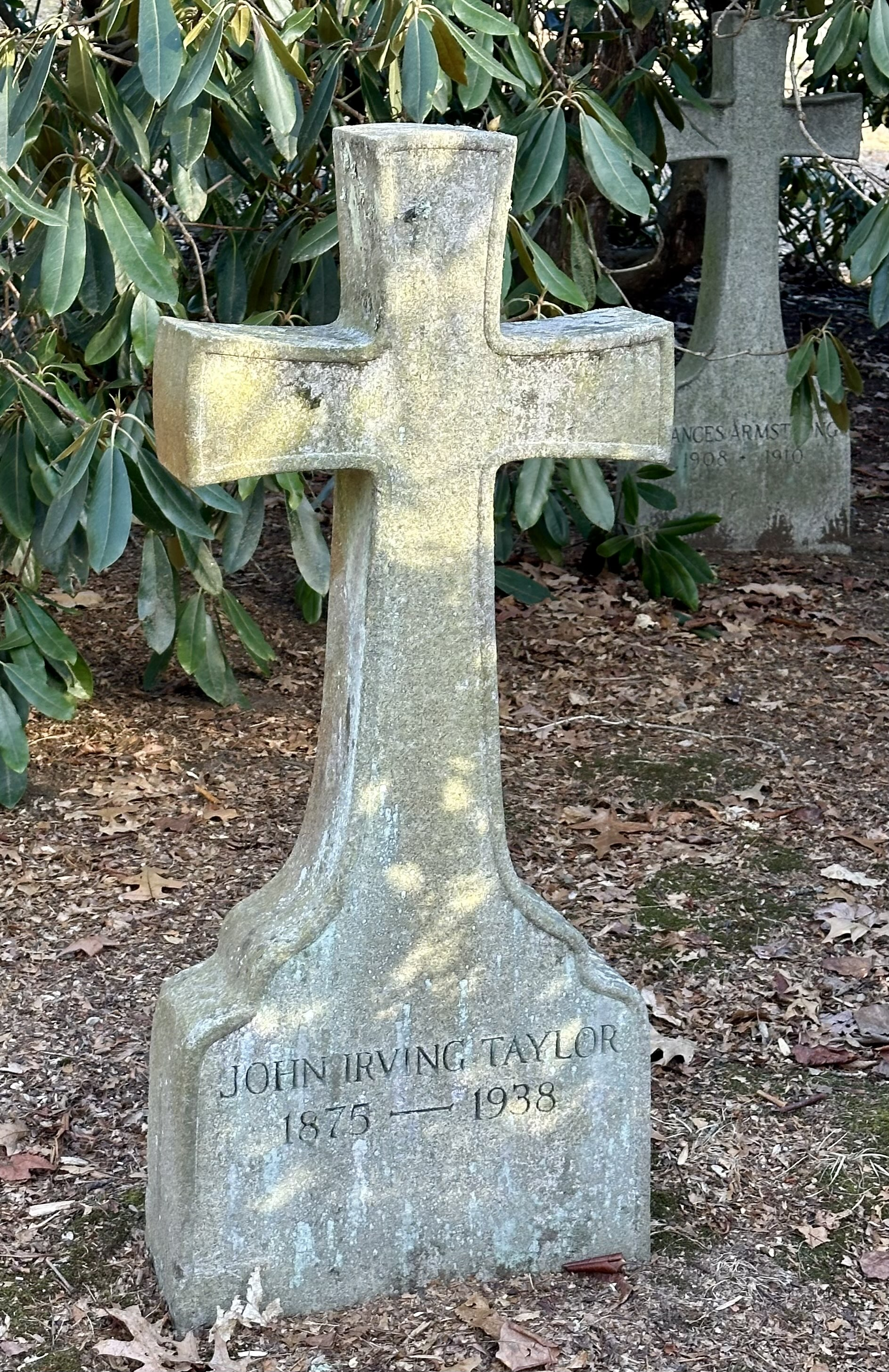

== Notes ==
Sporting positions
Preceded by Henry Killilea	Owner of the Boston Americans / Red Sox; April 19, 1904 – May 15, 1914 (with Jimmy McAleer, September 1911 – December 21, 1913) (with Joseph Lannin, December 21, 1913 – May 15, 1914)	Succeeded by Joseph Lannin
Preceded by Henry Killilea	Boston Americans / Red Sox President; 1904–1911	Succeeded by Jimmy McAleer
