= Jonathan Winship =

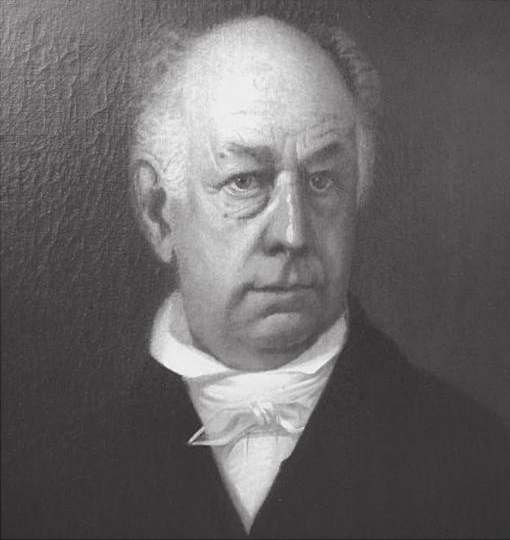
1850 portrait by Thomas Badger

Jonathan Winship III (1780–1843) was an American 19th-century sailor and entrepreneur, the son and grandson of Jonathan Winships I and II, who in 1775 established a cattle market in Brighton, Massachusetts which became the largest in the state. In the early 1800s Winship was Captain of the Winship family's O'Cain trading vessel on all but its first voyage (when he was first mate), trading across the Pacific. Winship is credited with the first recorded entry into Humboldt Bay by sea, in June 1806. Winship Point and O'Cain Point in the South Shetland Islands are named for Winship and his vessel.

The War of 1812 led Winship to seek refuge in China, where he acquired horticultural skills. In 1820 he and his brother Francis founded a horticultural company, and later he played a key role in the founding of the Massachusetts Horticultural Society.
