= Thinking Basketball =

YouTube channel

Ben Taylor

YouTube information
- Channel: Thinking Basketball
- Years active: 2018−present
- Genre: basketball
- Subscribers: 672 thousand
- Views: 118.8 million
- Last updated: April 23, 2026

Thinking Basketball is a YouTube channel that analyzes National Basketball Association (NBA) game footage. Produced and narrated by Ben Taylor, the channel launched in December 2018. It shares a name with a 2016 book Taylor previously wrote. Taylor also hosts a podcast with the same name, launched in August 2018.

On the YouTube channel, many Thinking Basketball videos focus on individual players or a team's gameplan, reviewing and analyzing their game footage and statistics. Taylor also released a series discussing the greatest player peaks in NBA history, such as Larry Bird's. Taylor later released a follow-up 21st Century Peaks series.

Taylor has officially partnered with the NBA to break down game footage. Several of his videos have been reposted on the NBA's official website, and Thinking Basketball was included among the content platformed on the league's mobile app when it was revamped ahead of the 2025−26 season. In 2021, Taylor has appeared as a guest on The Void, a podcast platformed on the sports website The Ringer. In 2025, Taylor was a guest on the website's flagship NBA-centered podcast.

Taylor's analysis has been referenced by basketball media outlets including Slam and Bleacher Report, with the latter's Andy Bailey writing, "There may not be anyone who blends cutting-edge statistical analysis with NBA history better than Thinking Basketball's Ben Taylor".
