= Laurence L. Winship =

American journalist

- Born: February 19, 1890; Somerville, Massachusetts, US
- Died: March 3, 1975 (aged 85); Marlborough, Massachusetts, US
- Education: Harvard College
- Occupations: Journalist, editor
- Employer: The Boston Globe
- Spouse: Ruth Spindler
- Children: 3, including Thomas Winship
- Father: Albert Edward Winship
- Relatives: George Parker Winship (brother)

Laurence Leathe Winship (February 19, 1890 – March 3, 1975) was an American journalist who served as editor of The Boston Globe from 1955 until 1965.

== Biography ==
Winship was born in 1890 in Somerville, Massachusetts. His father was an editor of the Journal of Education. The younger Winship attended Somerville Latin School and graduated from Harvard College in 1911. He joined The Boston Globe in 1912, was married in 1915, and served in the United States Army during World War I.

Back with the Globe, Winship rose quickly through the ranks to become editor of the Sunday edition. He was named managing editor in 1937, and became editor in 1955. Named editor by publisher William Davis Taylor, Winship was the first person to hold that title other than prior publishers (Taylor's father and grandfather) in 75 years.

During Winship's tenure as editor, the Globe rose from third to first in the competitive field of what was then eight Boston newspapers. He served as editor until September 1965, when he retired from the role while continuing to write for the paper. He was succeeded as editor by his son Thomas, who served as editor until 1984.

Winship and his wife, Ruth, had two sons and a daughter; they lived in Sudbury, Massachusetts. Winship died in 1975 at a hospital in neighboring Marlborough, Massachusetts.

| Preceded by William O. Taylor | Editor of The Boston Globe; 1955–1965 | Succeeded by Thomas Winship |
