= Charles H. Taylor (publisher) =

American publisher and politician

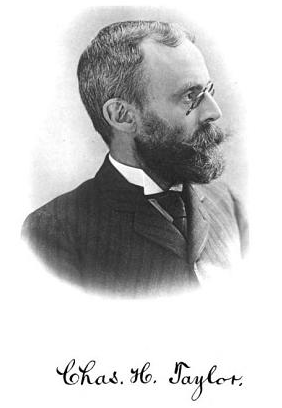

Member of the Massachusetts House of Representatives

Personal details
- Born: July 14, 1846 Charlestown, Massachusetts, U.S.
- Died: June 22, 1921 (aged 74) Boston, Massachusetts, U.S.
- Spouse: Georgiana Olivia Davis (m. 1867–1919; her death)
- Children: 5, including William O. Taylor and John I. Taylor
- Occupation: Journalist, publisher
- Known for: First publisher of The Boston Globe

Military service
- Allegiance: United States; Union
- Branch/service: Union Army
- Unit: 38th Massachusetts Infantry Regiment Massachusetts Volunteers
- Battles/wars: American Civil War; Siege of Port Hudson

Charles Henry Taylor (July 14, 1846 – June 22, 1921) was an American journalist and politician. He created the modern Boston Globe, acting as its publisher starting in 1873. He was elected to the Massachusetts House of Representatives in 1872, and later served as private secretary to the Governor of Massachusetts.

== Personal life ==
Taylor was born July 14, 1846, in Charlestown, Massachusetts, to John Ingalls Taylor and Abigail Russell Hapgood. At the advent of the American Civil War, Taylor enlisted in the Union Army at the age of 16 and was badly wounded at the Battle of Port Hudson.

Taylor married Georgiana Olivia Davis in March 1867, and the couple had three sons and two daughters. His wife died in 1919, predeceasing him by two years. His commonly used military rank, General Taylor, was due to his service and rank in the Massachusetts state militia.

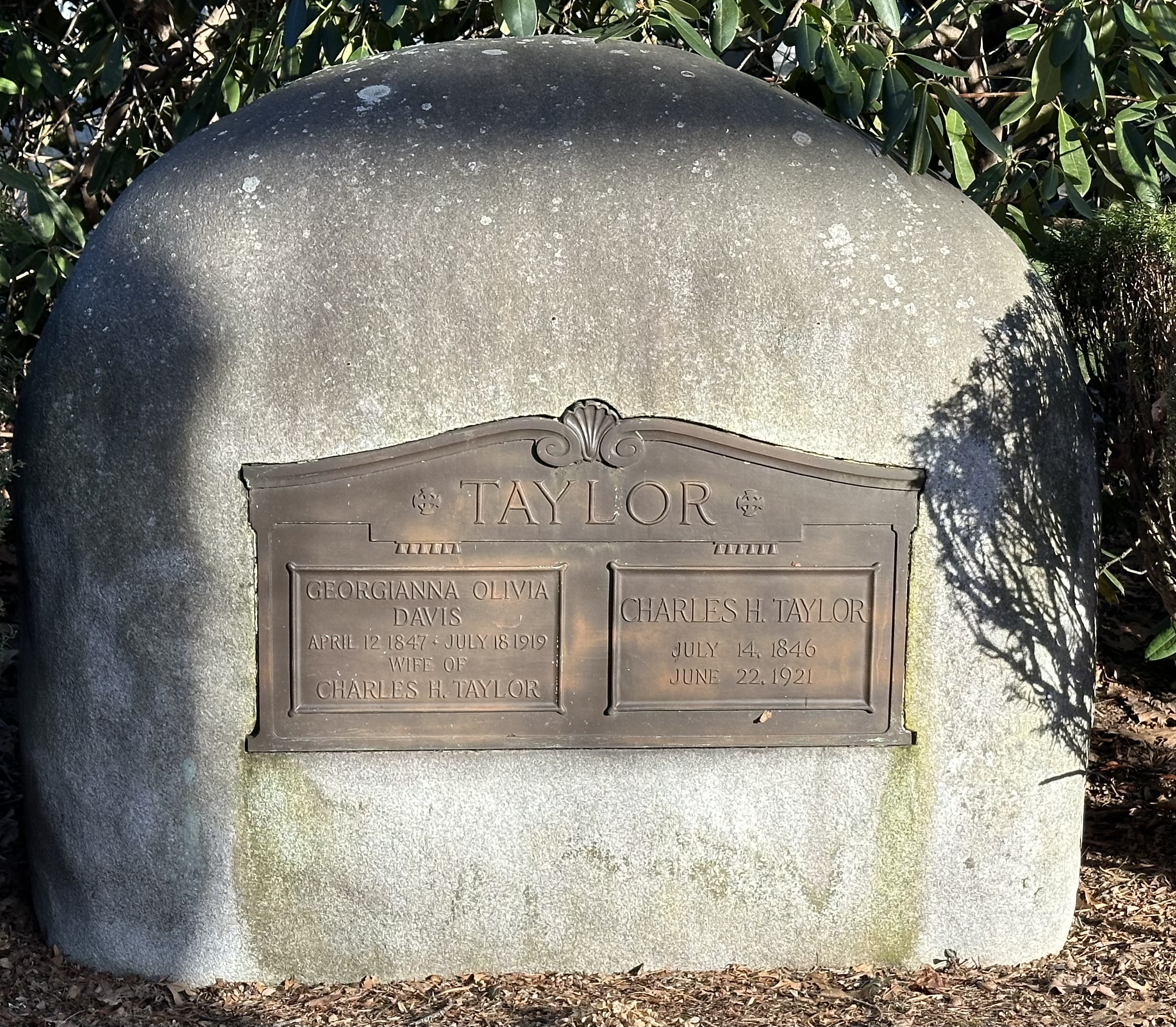

He died in 1921 in Boston, Massachusetts.

== The Boston Globe ==
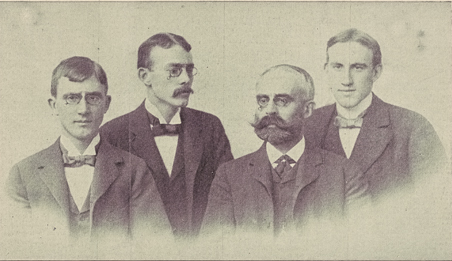
Taylor (second from right) with sons Charles Jr. (left), William (second from left), and John (right)

Taylor joined The Boston Globe in 1873, one year after it was founded. The newspaper was started by six Boston businessmen, led by merchant Eben Dyer Jordan, who jointly invested $150,000. The first issue was published March 4, 1872, at the price of four cents. In August 1873, with the paper facing low circulation and financial difficulties, Jordan hired Taylor as temporary business manager. At the time, Taylor was a 27-year-old Civil War veteran, who had worked as a staff member and printer for the Boston Traveler, and as a stringer for the New York Tribune.

His efforts ultimately created a profitable, large-circulation newspaper. He reduced the price to two cents and "laid down a strict rule that all news should be given impartially." His most important innovation, however, was adding stock quotations, women's pages, and sports coverage to the previous menu of political, national and foreign news, creating a prototype of a modern family newspaper. Within three weeks of his advent as publisher, the circulation climbed from 8,000 to 30,000.

All three of Taylor's sons were involved in management of the Globe:

- Charles H. Taylor Jr. – treasurer-manager (1893–1937)
- William O. Taylor – succeeded his father as editor and publisher (1921–1955)
- John I. Taylor – classified advertising (1893–1896); best remembered for having owned the Boston Red Sox from 1904 to 1914.

Taylor has been credited with establishing effective election projection methods, enabling the Globe to "tame the mass of information flowing through the newsroom with specifically designed organizational tools"; he personally oversaw the paper's election projections from 1883 through 1920. The Globe successfully avoided an incorrect call in the 1916 United States presidential election, when it initially appeared that Republican Charles Evans Hughes would defeat incumbent Democrat Woodrow Wilson.

== See also ==
- 1872 Massachusetts legislature

Preceded by Newspaper founded	Publisher of The Boston Globe; 1873–1921	Succeeded by William O. Taylor
Preceded by Edwin C. Bailey	Editor of The Boston Globe; 1880–1921	Succeeded by William O. Taylor
