= List of awards won by Boston Globe Media =

The Boston Globe has received numerous national and international honors recognizing excellence in journalism, including Pulitzer Prizes, George Polk Awards, Peabody Awards and Alfred I. duPont–Columbia University Awards. This list includes the organization's most prominent awards.

== Pulitzer Prizes ==
The Boston Globe has won 27 Pulitzer Prizes since 1966.

| Year | Category | Work | Recipient(s) |
|---|---|---|---|
| 2021 | Investigative Reporting | Blind Spot | Matt Rocheleau, Vernal Coleman, Laura Crimaldi, Evan Allen and Brendan McCarthy |
| 2016 | Commentary | – | Sarah Stockman |
| 2016 | Feature Photography | – | Jessica Rinaldi |
| 2015 | Editorial Writing | Restaurant Workers | Kathleen Kingsbury |
| 2014 | Breaking News | Marathon Bombing coverage | – |
| 2012 | Criticism | – | Wesley Morris |
| 2011 | Criticism | – | Sebastian Smee |
| 2008 | Criticism | – | Mark Feeney |
| 2007 | National Reporting | – | Charlie Savage |
| 2005 | Explanatory Reporting | – | Gareth Cook |
| 2003 | Public Service | – | Boston Globe Staff |
| 2001 | Criticism | – | Gail Caldwell |
| 1997 | Commentary | – | Eileen McNamara |
| 1996 | Criticism | – | Robert Campbell |
| 1995 | Beat Reporting | – | David Shribman |
| 1985 | Feature Photography | – | Stan Grossfeld |
| 1984 | Local Investigative Specialized Reporting, Specialized Reporting | – | Kenneth Cooper, Joan Fitz Gerald, Jonathan Kaufman, Norman Lockman, Gary McMillan, Kirk Scharfenberg and David Wessel |
| 1984 | Spot News Photography | – | Stan Grossfeld |
| 1983 | National Reporting | – | Boston Globe Staff |
| 1980 | Local Investigative Specialized Reporting | – | Stephen A. Kurkjian, Alexander B. Hawes Jr., Nils Bruzelius, Joan Vennochi and Robert M. Porterfield |
| 1977 | Editorial Cartooning | – | Paul Szep |
| 1975 | Public Service | Boston School Desegregation Crisis | – |
| 1966 | Public Service | Campaign to prevent confirmation of Francis X Morrissey as a Federal District Judge in Massachusetts | – |

== George Polk Awards ==
This section applies to publications published by Boston Globe Media, including STAT and Boston magazine.

| Year | Category | Publication | Work | Recipient(s) |
|---|---|---|---|---|
| 2026 | Local Reporting | The Boston Globe | The Education of Rümeysa Öztürk | Giulia McDonnell, Nieto del Rio and Mark Arsenault |
| 2026 | Health Reporting | STAT | American Science, Shattered | Lizzy Lawrence, STAT staff |
| 2024 | Health Reporting | STAT | Health Care’s Colossus | – |
| 2021 | Medical Reporting | STAT | Inside ‘Project Onyx’: How Biogen used an FDA back channel to win approval of its polarizing Alzheimer’s drug | Adam Feuerstein, Matthew Herper and Damian Garde |
| 2012 | Legal Reporting | The Boston Globe | For delving into a high acquittal rate in Massachusetts drunk driving cases | Thomas Farragher, Marcella Bombardieri, Jonathan Saltzman, Matt Carroll and Darren Durlach |
| 2002 | Foreign Reporting | The Boston Globe | – | Anthony Shadid |
| 2002 | National Reporting | The Boston Globe | – | – |
| 1998 | Medical Reporting | The Boston Globe | – | Robert Whitaker and Dolores Kong |
| 1994 | Metropolitan Reporting | The Boston Globe | – | David Armstrong, Shelley Murphy and Stephan Kurkjian |
| 1986 | Financial Reporting | The Boston Globe | – | Peter G. Gosselin |
| 1985 | Business Reporting | The Boston Globe | – | Spotlight/Business Team |

== Peabody Awards ==
| Year | Category | Honor | Work | Recipient(s) |
|---|---|---|---|---|
| 2024 | Documentary | Nominee | Murder in Boston: Roots, Rampage, Reckoning | The Boston Globe and HBO |

== Alfred I. duPont–Columbia Awards ==
| Year | Category | Work | Recipient(s) |
|---|---|---|---|
| 2025 | – | Murder in Boston: Roots, Rampage, Reckoning | The Boston Globe and HBO |

== Online journalism awards ==
| Year | Category | Work | Recipient(s) |
|---|---|---|---|
| 2025 | Innovation in Revenue Strategy | – | The Boston Globe |
| 2024 | Feature | Nightmare in Mission Hill | – |
| 2024 | General Excellence in Online Journalism | – | The Boston Globe |
| 2023 | Large Newsroom Feature | Katie Price remembers something terrible | – |
| 2023 | Online Commentary | – | Jeneé Osterheldt |
| 2022 | General Excellence in Online Journalism | – | The Boston Globe |
| 2020 | Explanatory Reporting | Seeing Red | The Boston Globe |
| 2019 | Excellence in Audio Digital Storytelling | Last Seen | WBUR and The Boston Globe |
| 2019 | Feature | Losing Laura | – |
| 2013 | Knight Award for Public Service | 68 Blocks | – |

== Gerald Loeb Awards ==
This section applies to publications published by Boston Globe Media, including STAT and Boston magazine.

| Year | Category | Publication | Work | Recipient(s) |
|---|---|---|---|---|
| 2025 | Local Category | The Boston Globe | Extensive Spotlight Team investigation into Steward Health Care | The Boston Globe and Organized Crime and Corruption Reporting Project |
| 2025 | Explanatory Reporting | STAT | The War on Recovery | Lev Facher |
| 2024 | Investigative Reporting | STAT | Denied by AI: Consequences for Sick and Vulnerable Americans | Casey Ross and Bob Herman |
| 2018 | Commentary | STAT | The Pharmalot View | Ed Silverman |

== National Emmy Awards ==
| Year | Category | Work | Recipient(s) |
|---|---|---|---|
| 2024 | Outstanding Crime and Justice Documentary | Murder in Boston: Roots, Rampage, Reckoning | The Boston Globe, HBO |

== National magazine awards ==
This section applies to publications published by Boston Globe Media, including STAT and Boston magazine.

| Year | Category | Publication | Work | Recipient(s) |
|---|---|---|---|---|
| 2025 | General Excellence | STAT | – | STAT Staff |

== Other awards and honors ==
In addition to the awards listed above, The Boston Globe and its journalists have received recognition from numerous journalism, media, photography, design, and press organizations, including:

- Associated Press Sports Editors (APSE) Awards
- Association of Health Care Journalists Awards
- Boston/New England Emmy Awards
- Education Writers Association National Awards
- Eppy Awards
- Edward R. Murrow Awards
- Goldsmith Prize
- Hillman Prizes
- INMA Global Media Awards
- Investigative Reporters and Editors (IRE) Awards
- Livingston Awards
- National Association of Black Journalists (NABJ) Salute to Excellence Awards
- National Association of Hispanic Journalists (NAHJ) Awards
- National Association of Real Estate Editors (NAREE) Journalism Awards
- National Headliner Awards
- New England Newspaper & Press Association Better Newspaper Competition
- Rhode Island Press Association Awards
- Scripps Howard Journalism Awards
- Selden Ring Award for Investigative Reporting
- Society for Advancing Business Editing and Writing (SABEW) Best in Business Awards
- Society for Features Journalism Awards
- Society for News Design Awards
- Sigma Delta Chi Awards
- Webby Awards
- White House News Photographers Association Awards
- Worth Bingham Prize

This list is limited to the organization's most prominent awards. A more comprehensive and regularly updated record of awards and honors received by The Boston Globe and Boston Globe Media publications is maintained on the organization's official awards website.

== See also ==
- George Polk Awards
- Peabody Awards
- Gerald Loeb Award
