= Nancy Barnes =

American journalist (born 1961)

- Born: 1961 (age 64–65)
- Education: University of Virginia (BA); University of North Carolina (MBA)
- Occupations: Journalist, author

Nancy Barnes (born 1961) is an American journalist and newspaper editor. She served as editor of The Boston Globe from 2023 to 2025 and as chief news executive of NPR from 2018 to 2022, She sits on the board of the Peabody Awards, which are presented by the Henry W. Grady College of Journalism and Mass Communication.

== Education ==
External audio
- Houston Matters, Nancy Barnes Leaves The Houston Chronicle For NPR, 5:34, Houston Public Media

Barnes earned a bachelor's degree in international relations from the University of Virginia and an MBA from the University of North Carolina.

== Career ==
Before joining The Boston Globe in 2023, Barnes was the chief news executive at NPR. Prior jobs include editor of the Minneapolis Star Tribune from 2003 to 2013 and editor and executive vice president of news for the Houston Chronicle between 2013 and 2018.

In 2013, while Barnes was editor at the Star Tribune the paper won the Pulitzer Prize for local news for reporting on infant deaths at day care facilities. It also won the Gerald Loeb Award for Breaking News and two 2013 Edward R. Murrow Awards for multimedia journalism.

While she led the Chronicle the paper won the 2015 Pulitzer Prize for commentary. It was a Pulitzer finalist in 2017 for reports on the denial of special education to tens of thousands of Texas students, and a 2018 finalist for its reporting on Hurricane Harvey.

At NPR, Barnes succeeded Michael Oreskes after he was fired over sexual harassment allegations. Barnes was the fourteenth person and fourth woman to head NPR's news division since the position was defined in 1979.

On November 14, 2022, The Boston Globe announced that Barnes would become its 13th editor and the first woman to lead the Globe’s newsroom. Barnes said in December 2025 that she would step down as editor to become an editor at large; she will be replaced by her predecessor, Brian McGrory.

Preceded by Brian McGrory	Editor of The Boston Globe; 2023–ongoing	Succeeded by incumbent
