= Benjamin Taylor (cricketer) =

English cricketer

Benjamin Williamson Taylor (16 June 1873 – 24 August 1938) was an English first-class cricketer active 1902–09 who played for Nottinghamshire. He was born in Kimberley, Nottinghamshire; died in Eastwood, Nottinghamshire.
