= Winship Point =

Winship Point (62°14′32″S 58°43′43″W) is a point at the west side of the entrance to Potter Cove, King George Island, in the South Shetland Islands. Named by the United Kingdom Antarctic Place-Names Committee (UK-APC) in 1960 for Jonathan Winship, master of the ship O'Cain in 1820–21, operating from Potter Cove.
