= Wakefield Rattan Company =

- Wakefield Rattan Co.
- U.S. National Register of Historic Places
- Now-demolished Wakefield Rattan Company buildings, c. 1985

- Location within Massachusetts Location within the United States
- Location: 134 Water St., Wakefield, Massachusetts
- Coordinates: 42°30′11″N 71°3′59″W
- Built: 1889
- MPS: Wakefield MRA
- NRHP reference No.: 89000692
- Added to NRHP: July 06, 1989

The Wakefield Rattan Company was the world's leading manufacturer of rattan furniture and objects in the second half of the 19th century. Founded by Cyrus Wakefield in 1851 in South Reading, Massachusetts (now Wakefield), it perfected machinery for working with rattan, developing looms for weaving chair seats and mats. Its products also included wicker furniture and baby carriages. The company also successfully found uses for previously wasted portions of the plant, using shavings to create baling fabric and floor coverings. Its products were available throughout the United States.

== History ==
In 1868, Cyrus Wakefield donated a new town hall to South Reading, which renamed itself Wakefield in his honor. He was also a major benefactor and investor in the town.

When Wakefield died in 1873, his company employed 1,000 workers at an 11 acres (4.5 ha) site just outside the town center. In the 1890s, the company merged with Heywood Brothers, becoming the Heywood-Wakefield Company. The manufacturing facilities were updated after several fires did significant damage to the plant.

By 1930, the company's business had declined, and its facilities were redeveloped for other uses. In 1972, a fire destroyed all but four buildings. In 1989, those buildings were listed on the National Register of Historic Places. In 2005, they were demolished and replaced by a supermarket.

== See also ==
- National Register of Historic Places listings in Wakefield, Massachusetts
- National Register of Historic Places listings in Middlesex County, Massachusetts
