= Albert Edward Winship =

American journalist

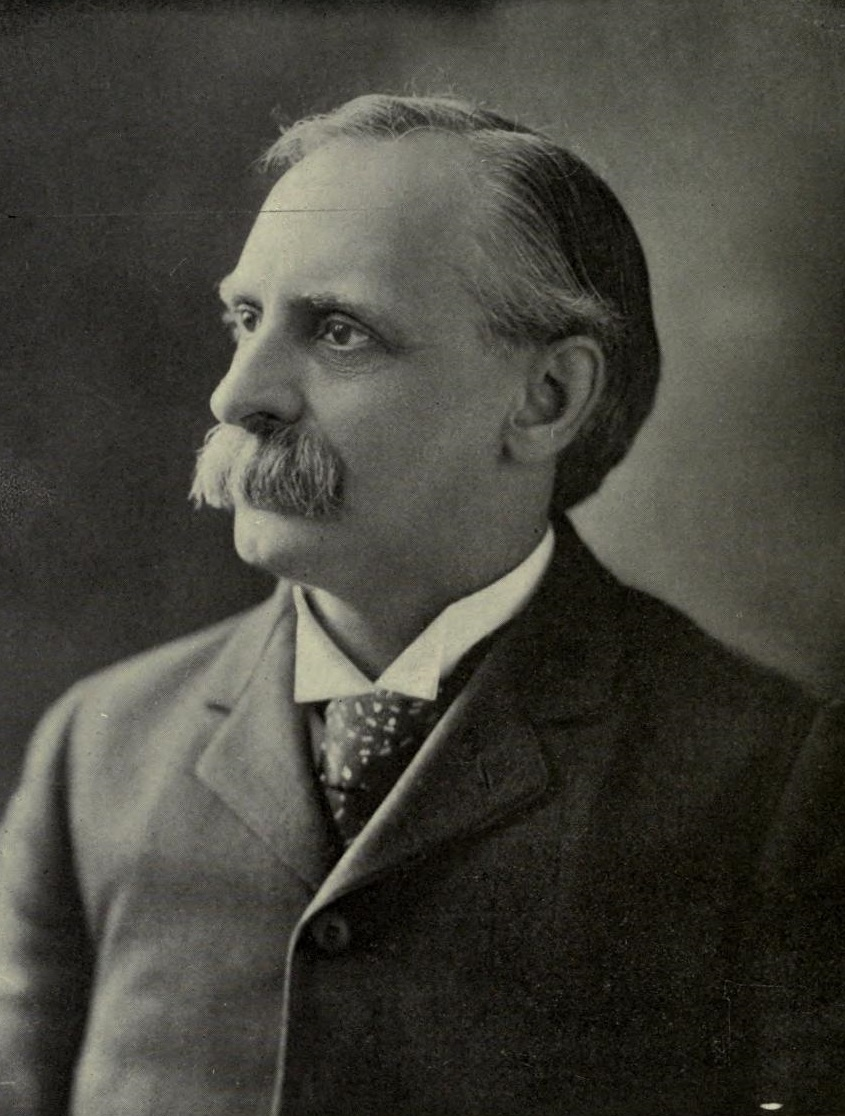
A. E. Winship

Albert Edward Winship (February 24, 1845 – February 16, 1933) was a pioneering American educator and educational journalist.

== Biography ==
Winship was born in West Bridgewater, Massachusetts. He attended Andover Theological Seminary in 1875. He was a pastor from 1876 to 1883. He had transferred himself over to the field of education by 1886 when he became editor of the Journal of Education, Boston, which grew to become one of the most influential educational magazines in the country.

From 1903 to 1909, Winship was a member of the Massachusetts State Board of Education. His published works include: Horace Mann, the educator (1896) and Great American Educators (1900). He was the father of librarian and author George Parker Winship and of The Boston Globe editor Laurence L. Winship.

He died at his home in Cambridge on February 16, 1933.

== Sources ==
- G. P. Winship (1987). Circuit rider of the American schools: Albert Edward Winship, 1845-1933. King College.
