= The Boston Globe =

American daily newspaper

Coordinates: 42°21′30″N 71°03′21″W

- The April 18, 2011, front page of The Boston Globe
- Type: Daily newspaper
- Format: Broadsheet
- Owner(s): Boston Globe Media Partners, LLC
- Publisher: John W. Henry
- Editor: Brian McGrory
- Opinion editor: James Dao
- Founded: March 4, 1872; 154 years ago
- Headquarters: Exchange Place, Boston, Massachusetts, U.S.
- Country: United States
- Circulation: 45,600 average print circulation (2025) ▼313,000 paid digital subscribers (2026) ▲
- ISSN: 0743-1791
- OCLC number: 66652431
- Website: bostonglobe.com

The Boston Globe, also known locally as the Globe, is an American daily newspaper founded and based in Boston, Massachusetts. The Boston Globe is the oldest and largest daily newspaper in Boston and tenth-largest newspaper by print circulation in the United States as of 2023.

Founded in 1872 by six area businessmen before being sold to the Globe's early business manager and publisher, Charles H. Taylor and his family. After being privately held until 1973, it was sold to The New York Times in 1993 for $1.1 billion, making it one of the most expensive print purchases in United States history. The newspaper was purchased in 2013 by sports magnate John W. Henry for $70 million from The New York Times Company, having lost over 90% of its value in 20 years. The chief print rival of The Boston Globe is the Boston Herald, whose circulation is smaller and was shrinking faster as of 2018.

The newspaper has won a total of 27 Pulitzer Prizes. The New York Times called it "one of the nation's most prestigious papers" in 2013. In 1967, The Boston Globe became the first major paper in the U.S. to oppose the Vietnam War. The paper's 2002 coverage of the Roman Catholic Church sex abuse scandal received international media attention and served as the basis for the 2015 American drama film Spotlight. Since January 2026, the editor has been Brian McGrory.

== History ==
=== 19th century ===
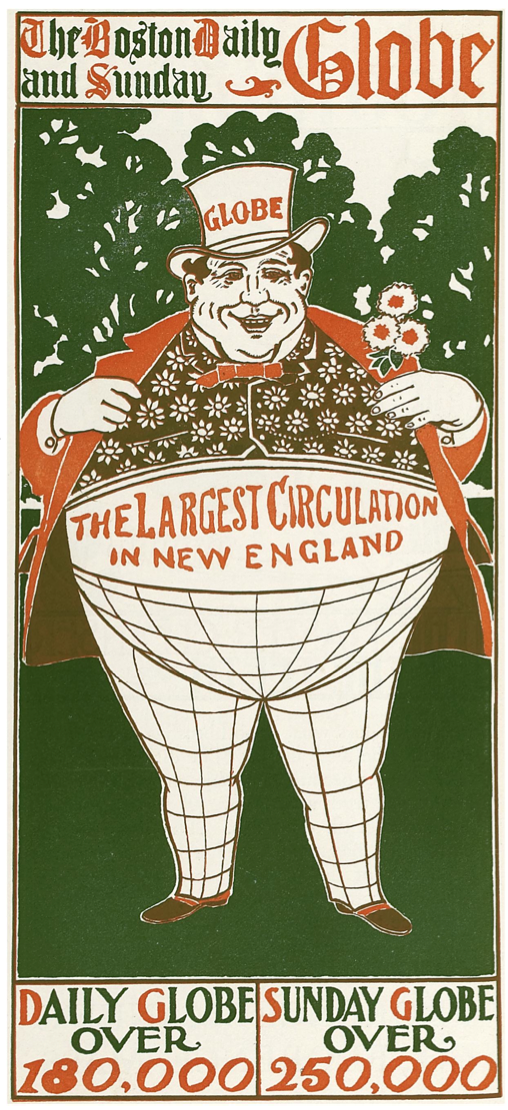
An advertisement for The Boston Globe from 1896

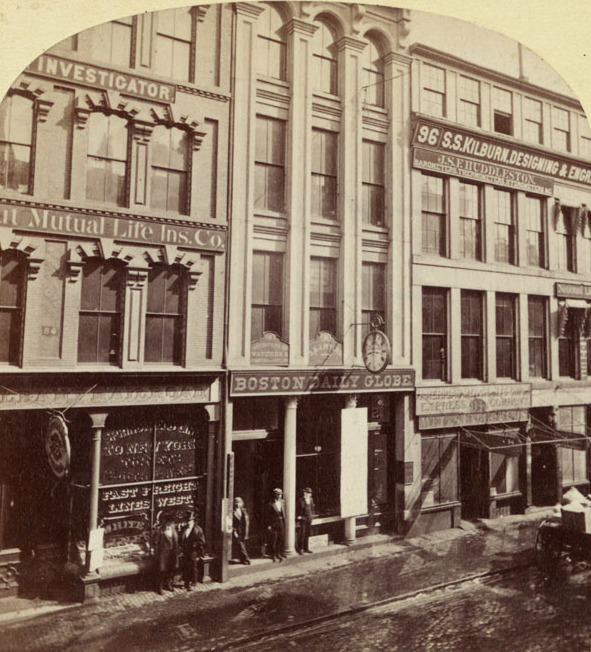
The original Boston Daily Globe building on Washington Street in Boston, c. 1872

The Boston Globe was founded in 1872 by six Boston businessmen who jointly invested $150,000 (equivalent to $4,031,250 in 2025). The founders included Eben Dyer Jordan of the Jordan Marsh department store, and Cyrus Wakefield of the Wakefield Rattan Company and namesake of the town of Wakefield, Massachusetts. The first issue was published on March 4, 1872, and sold for four cents (equivalent to $1.08 in 2025). In August 1873, Jordan hired Charles H. Taylor as temporary business manager; in December, Taylor signed a contract to be general manager of the paper for two years. He would serve as the first publisher of The Boston Globe until his death in 1921, and was succeeded by four of his descendants until 1999.

Originally a morning daily, the Globe began its Sunday edition in 1877. A weekly edition called The Boston Weekly Globe, catering to mail subscribers outside the city, was published from 1873 until it was absorbed by the Sunday edition in 1892. In 1878, The Boston Globe started an afternoon edition called The Boston Evening Globe, which ceased publication in 1979. The morning edition bore the title The Boston Daily Globe until the word "Daily" was dropped from the nameplate in 1960.

=== 20th century ===
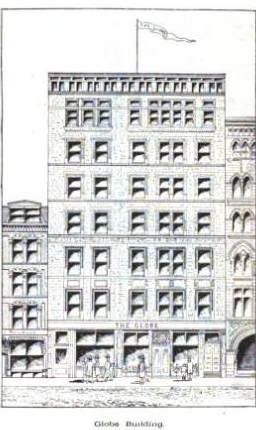
The second Globe headquarters, home of the paper from 1887 to 1958, built on and adjacent to the site of the original Globe building

In 1912, the Globe was one of a cooperative of four newspapers, including the Chicago Daily News, The New York Globe, and the Philadelphia Bulletin, to form the Associated Newspapers syndicate.

In the early 1900s Charles H. Taylor was responsible for making the Globe the most used newspaper in New England. He went into greater details regarding social movements such as the Women's suffrage movement, while other competitors such as The Boston Post did not shine as much light on these social movements.

In the 1940 Massachusetts gubernatorial election, the Globe correctly projected the re-election of Republican incumbent Leverett Saltonstall, using methods first established by Taylor; rival The Boston Post called the race incorrectly for Democrat Paul A. Dever.

In 1955, Laurence L. Winship was named editor, ending a 75-year period of the role being held by the paper's publishers. In the next decade, the Globe rose from third to first in the competitive field of what was then eight Boston newspapers.

In 1958, the Globe moved from its original location on Washington Street in downtown Boston to Morrissey Boulevard in the Dorchester neighborhood.

In 1965, Thomas Winship succeeded his father as editor. The younger Winship transformed the Globe from a mediocre local paper into a regional paper of national distinction. He served as editor until 1984, during which time the paper won a dozen Pulitzer Prizes, the first in the paper's history.

The Boston Globe was a private company until 1973 when it went public under the name Affiliated Publications. It continued to be managed by the descendants of Charles Taylor. In 1993, The New York Times Company purchased Affiliated Publications for US$1.1 billion, making The Boston Globe a wholly owned subsidiary of The New York Times' parent. The Jordan and Taylor families received substantial The New York Times Company stock, but by 1999 the last Taylor family members had left management.

Boston.com, the online edition of The Boston Globe, was launched on the World Wide Web in 1995. Consistently ranked among the top ten newspaper websites in America, it has won numerous national awards and took two regional Emmy Awards in 2009 for its video work.

The Boston Globe has consistently been ranked in the forefront of American journalism. Time magazine listed it as one of the ten best US daily newspapers in 1974 and 1984, and the Globe tied for sixth in a national survey of top editors who chose "America's Best Newspapers" in the Columbia Journalism Review in 1999.

=== 21st century ===
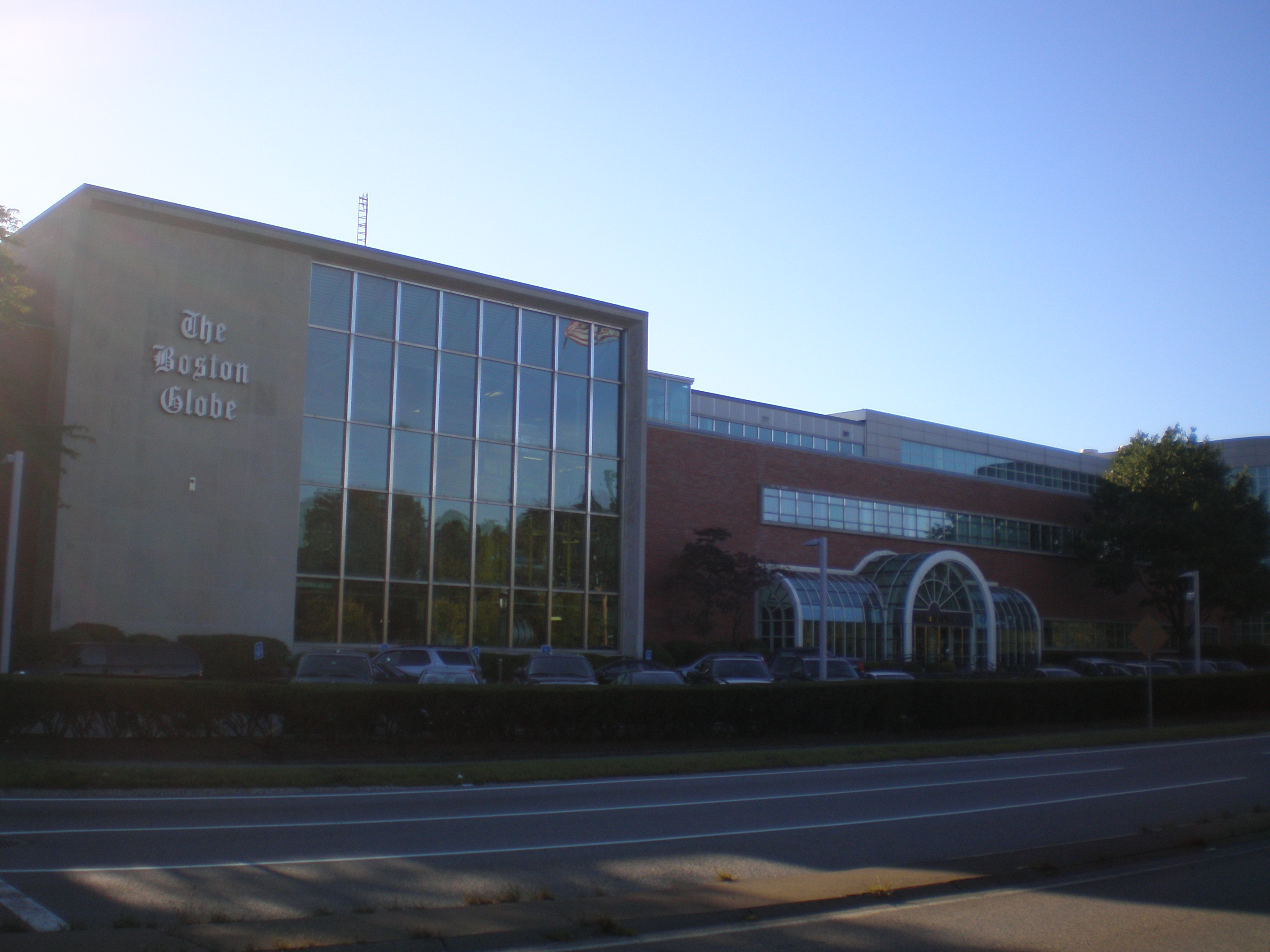
The newspaper's Morrissey Boulevard headquarters in Dorchester in September 2009. In 2017, the newspaper moved its printing operations to Taunton and its headquarters to Downtown Boston.

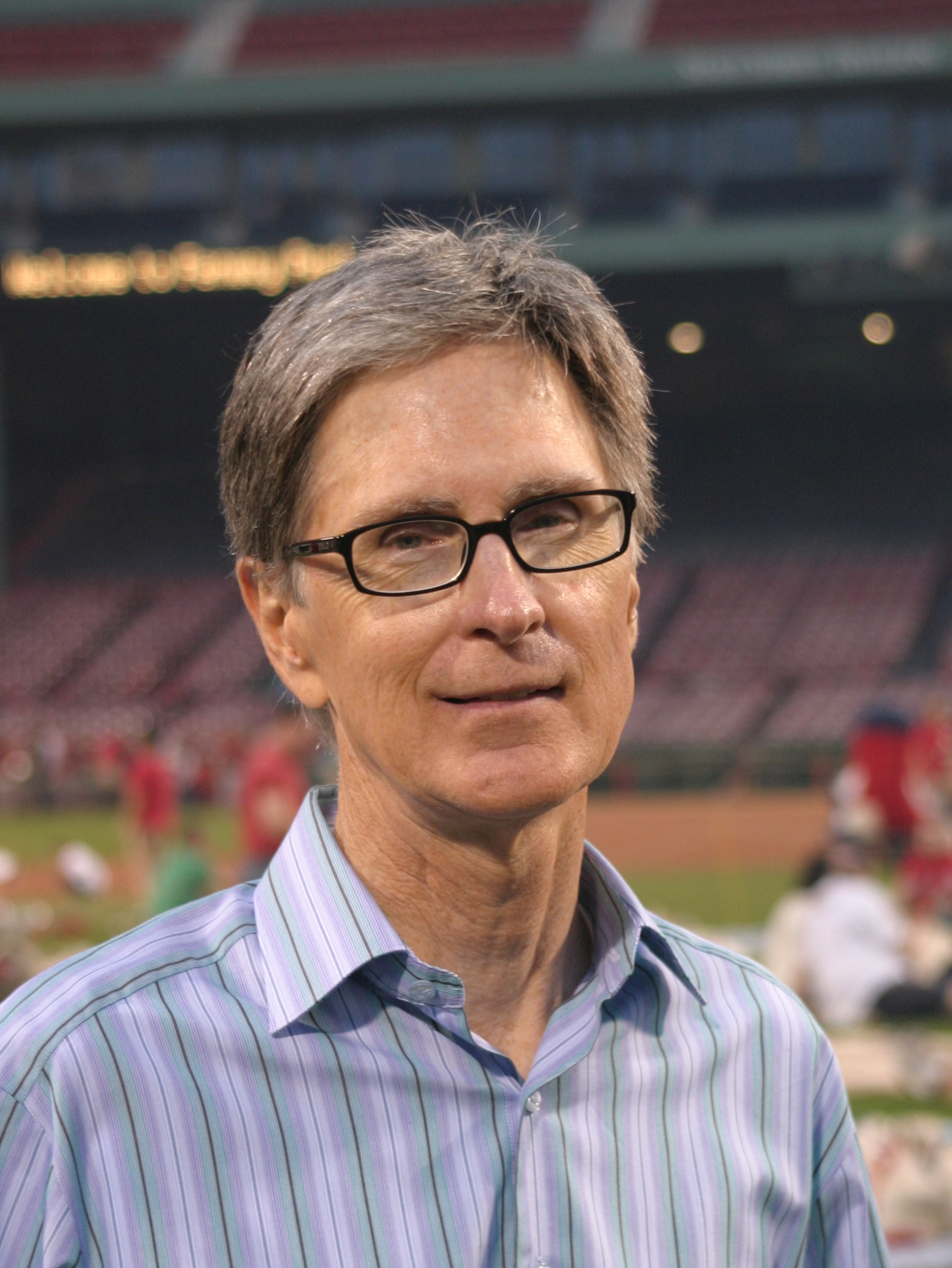
John W. Henry, who acquired the newspaper in 2013 for $70 million

Under two editors, Martin Baron and then Brian McGrory, the Globe shifted away from coverage of international news in favor of Boston-area news.

Globe reporters Michael Rezendes, Matt Carroll, Sacha Pfeiffer and Walter Robinson, and editor Ben Bradlee Jr. were instrumental in uncovering the Roman Catholic Church sex abuse scandal in 2001–2003, especially in relation to Massachusetts churches. The Boston Globe was awarded the Pulitzer Prize for their work and the work of other staff, one of several the paper has received for its investigative journalism, and their work was dramatized in the 2015 Academy Award–winning film Spotlight, named after the paper's in-depth investigative division.

The Boston Globe was the paper that allowed Peter Gammons to start his Notes section on baseball, which has become a mainstay in many major newspapers nationwide. In 2004, Gammons became the 56th recipient of the J. G. Taylor Spink Award for outstanding baseball writing, given by the BBWAA; he was honored at the Baseball Hall of Fame on July 31, 2005.

In 2007, Charlie Savage, whose reports on President Bush's use of signing statements made national news, won the Pulitzer Prize for National Reporting.

On April 2, 2009, The New York Times Company threatened to close the paper if its unions did not agree to $20 million of cost savings. Some of the cost savings include reducing union employees' pay by 5%, ending pension contributions, and ending certain employees' tenures.

The Boston Globe eliminated the equivalent of 50 full-time jobs; among buy-outs and layoffs, it swept out most of the part-time employees in the editorial sections. However, early on the morning of May 5, 2009, The New York Times Company announced it had reached a tentative deal with the Boston Newspaper Guild, which represents most of the Globe's editorial staff, that allowed it to get the concessions it demanded. The paper's other three major unions had agreed to concessions on May 3, 2009, after The New York Times Company threatened to give the government 60 days' notice that it intended to close the paper. Despite the cuts helping to "significantly [improve]" its financial performance by October of that year, the Globe's parent company indicated that it was considering strategic alternatives for the paper, but did not plan to sell it.

As of 2010, the Globe hosted 28 blogs covering a variety of topics, including Boston sports, local politics, and a blog made up of posts from the paper's opinion writers.

In September 2011, The Boston Globe launched a dedicated, subscription-based website at bostonglobe.com.

Starting in 2012, the Globe provided a printing and circulating service for the Boston Herald, and by 2013, was handling its rival's entire press run. This arrangement remained in place until 2018, ending after the acquisition of the Herald by Digital First Media.

In February 2013, The New York Times Company announced that it would sell its New England Media Group, which encompasses the Globe; bids were received by six parties, including John Gormally, then-owner of WGGB-TV in Springfield, Massachusetts, another group included members of former Globe publishers, the Taylor family, and Boston Red Sox principal owner John W. Henry, who bid for the paper through the New England Sports Network, which was majority owned by Fenway Sports Group and the Boston Bruins. However, after the NESN group dropped out of the running to buy the paper, Henry made his separate bid to purchase the Globe in July 2013.

On October 24, 2013, he took ownership of the Globe, at a $70 million purchase price, and renamed the venture Boston Globe Media.

On January 30, 2014, Henry named himself publisher and named Mike Sheehan, a prominent former Boston ad executive, to be CEO. As of January 2017, Doug Franklin replaced Mike Sheehan as CEO, then Franklin resigned after six months in the position, in July 2017, as a result of strategic conflicts with owner Henry.

In July 2016, the 815,000-square-foot headquarters in Dorchester was sold to an unknown buyer for an undisclosed price. The Globe moved its printing operations in June 2017 to Myles Standish Industrial Park in Taunton, Massachusetts. Also in June 2017, the Globe moved its headquarters to Exchange Place in Boston's Financial District.

In July 2022, James Dao, a senior editor with 30 years of experience at The New York Times, was named the editorial page editor, succeeding Bina Venkataraman.

In November 2022, The Boston Globe announced that NPR news chief Nancy Barnes would replace Brian McGrory as editor.

From September 1, 2022, to August 31, 2023, the Globe's combined print and digital circulation for weekdays increased by 2.7%, to 346,944, and for Sundays it rose by 1.3%, to 408,974. There are more than 245,000 digital-only subscriptions, an increase of about 10,000 since February 2022.

== Editorial pages ==
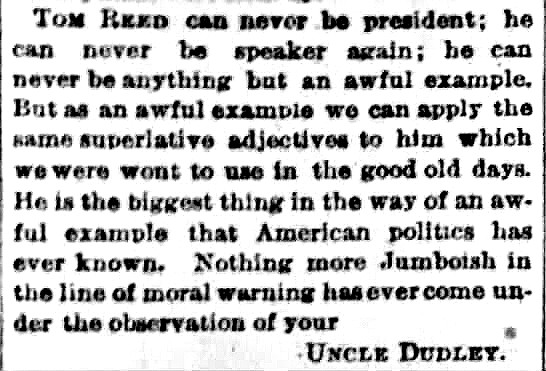
Final paragraph of a March 1891 Globe editorial discussing Thomas Brackett Reed, signed "Uncle Dudley"

Starting with the Sunday edition in 1891, and expanded to weekday editions in 1913, each lead editorial in the Globe was signed "Uncle Dudley", a practice ended by editor Thomas Winship in 1966.

In March 1980, the Globe published an editorial about a speech by President Jimmy Carter, which included the accidental headline "Mush from the Wimp" during part of the press run, drawing national attention.

Since 1981, the editorial pages of the Globe have been separate from the news operation, as is frequently customary in the news industry. Editorials represent the official view of The Boston Globe as a community institution. The publisher reserves the right to veto an editorial and usually determines political endorsements for high office.

The Globe made its first political endorsement in 1967, supporting Kevin White in that year's Boston mayoral election. The Globe has consistently endorsed Democratic presidential candidates, such as Joe Biden in the 2020 presidential election, but has sometimes endorsed Republicans in state and local elections, such as Charlie Baker for governor.

Describing the political position of The Boston Globe editorial page in 2001, former editorial page editor Renée Loth told the Boston University alumni magazine:

The Globe has a long tradition of being a progressive institution, and especially on social issues. We support woman's rights; We are pro-choice; we're against the death penalty; we're for gay rights. But if people read us carefully, they will find that on a whole series of other issues, we are not knee-jerk. We're for charter schools; we're for any number of business-backed tax breaks. We are a lot more nuanced and subtle than that liberal stereotype does justice to.

James Dao became the editorial page editor in 2022.

=== August 2018 campaign ===
In August 2018, the editorial board launched a coordinated campaign for newspapers nationwide to respond to President Donald Trump's "enemy of the people" attacks and "fake news" rants against the media by publishing locally produced editorial responses on Thursday, August 16. Within a couple of days, an estimated 100+ newspapers had pledged to join the campaign, jumping to roughly 200 a few days later.

On August 13, the Radio Television Digital News Association and its Voice of the First Amendment Task Force encouraged its 1,200 member organizations to join the campaign, while other media organizations also helped spread the call to action. Even as some right-leaning outlets portrayed the Globe's campaign as an attack on the president, rather than his rhetorical attacks on the Fourth Estate, some newspapers got a head start, releasing content on August 15, while 350 newspapers participated in the event on August 16.

From August 10 to 22, approximately 14 threatening phone calls were made to Boston Globe offices. The caller stated that the Globe was the "enemy of the people" and threatened to kill newspaper employees. On August 30, California resident Robert Chain was arrested by an FBI SWAT team and charged with a single count of making a threatening communication in interstate commerce. In May 2019, Chain pleaded guilty in a US federal court to seven counts of making threatening communications in interstate commerce.

== Magazines ==
=== The Boston Globe Magazine ===
Appearing in the Sunday paper almost every week is The Boston Globe Magazine. As of 2026, Veronica Chao is the editor, and contributors include Patricia Wen.

Since 2004, the December issue features a Bostonian of the Year. Past winners include Red Sox general manager Theo Epstein (2004), retired judge and Big Dig whistleblower Edward Ginsburg (2005), governor Deval Patrick (2006), Neighborhood Assistance Corporation of America founder and CEO Bruce Marks (2007), NBA champion Paul Pierce (2008), professor Elizabeth Warren (2009), Republican politician Scott Brown (2010), U.S. attorney Carmen Ortiz and ArtsEmerson executive director Robert Orchard (2011), Olympic gold medalists Aly Raisman and Kayla Harrison (2012), three people who were near the Boston Marathon bombing, Dan Marshall, Natalie Stavas, and Larry Hittinger (2013), Market Basket employees (2014), and neuropathologist Ann McKee (2017).

=== Design New England ===
On October 23, 2006, Boston Globe Media announced the publication of Design New England: The Magazine of Splendid Homes and Gardens. The glossy oversized magazine was published six times per year. The magazine ceased publication in 2018.

=== Boston magazine ===
On January 22, 2025, Boston Globe Media acquired Boston magazine—"known for its long form journalism, lifestyle and food coverage" and 50-year-old "Best of Boston" franchise from Philadelphia-based Metrocorp Publishing. As of 2025, Chris Vogel is the editor-in-chief.

== Pulitzer Prizes ==
- 1966: Meritorious Public Service for its "campaign to prevent the confirmation of Francis X. Morrissey as a Federal District judge."
- 1972: Local Reporting, The Boston Globe Spotlight Team for "their exposure of political favoritism and conflict of interest by office holders in Somerville, Massachusetts."
- 1974: Editorial Cartooning, Paul Szep.
- 1975: Meritorious Public Service, The Boston Globe, for its "massive and balanced coverage of the Boston school desegregation crisis."
- 1977: Editorial Cartooning, Paul Szep
- 1980: Distinguished Commentary, Ellen Goodman, columnist.
- 1980: Distinguished Criticism, William A. Henry III, for television criticism.
- 1980: Special Local Reporting, The Boston Globe Spotlight Team for describing transit mismanagement.
- 1983: National Reporting, The Boston Globe Magazine for its article "War and Peace in the Nuclear Age".
- 1984: Spot News Photography, Stan Grossfeld for photographing the effects of the Lebanese Civil War.
- 1984: For Local Investigative Specialized Reporting, Kenneth Cooper, Joan Fitz Gerald, Jonathan Kaufman, Norman Lockman, Gary Mc Millan, Kirk Scharfenberg and David Wessel of The Boston Globe for a series on racism including self-criticism.
- 1985: Feature Photography, Stan Grossfeld for a "series of photographs of the 1983–85 famine in Ethiopia and for his pictures of illegal aliens on the Mexican border." The Pulitzer was also awarded in equal parts to Larry C. Price of The Philadelphia Inquirer for his series on the war-torn peoples of Angola and El Salvador.
- 1995: Distinguished Beat Reporting, David M Shribman for his "analytical reporting on Washington developments and the national scene."
- 1996: Distinguished Criticism, Robert Campbell
- 1997: Distinguished Commentary, Eileen McNamara
- 2001: Distinguished Criticism, Gail Caldwell
- 2003: Public Service, Boston Globe Entire Newspaper Staff including the Spotlight Team for "courageous, comprehensive coverage in its disclosures of sexual abuse by priests in the Roman Catholic Church"
- 2005: Explanatory Reporting, Gareth Cook for "explaining, with clarity and humanity, the complex scientific and ethical dimensions of stem cell research."
- 2007: National Reporting, Charlie Savage
- 2008: Distinguished Criticism, Mark Feeney
- 2011: Distinguished Criticism, Sebastian Smee
- 2012: Distinguished Criticism, Wesley Morris
- 2014: Breaking News, for coverage of the Boston Marathon bombing
- 2015: Editorial Writing, Kathleen Kingsbury
- 2016: Distinguished Commentary, Farah Stockman
- 2016: Feature Photography, Jessica Rinaldi
- 2021: Investigative Reporting, for Blind Spot series which "uncovered a systematic failure by state governments to share information about dangerous truck drivers that could have kept them off the road, prompting immediate reforms."

== Notable personnel ==
=== Publishers ===
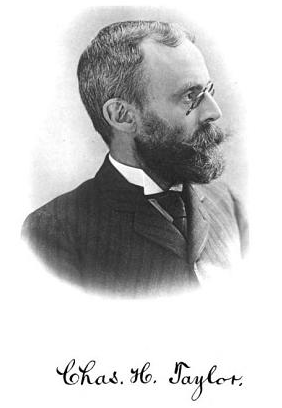
Charles H. Taylor, publisher from 1873 to 1921

Publisher	Years active	Notes
Charles H. Taylor	1873–1921	First publisher of The Boston Globe
William O. Taylor	1921–1955	Son of Charles H. Taylor
William Davis Taylor	1955–1977	Son of William O. Taylor
William O. Taylor II	1978–1997	Son of William Davis Taylor. Publisher during 1993 sale to The New York Times.
Benjamin B. Taylor	1997–1999	Grandson of John I. Taylor, the younger brother of William O. Taylor.
Richard H. Gilman	1999–2006	First publisher who was not a member of the Taylor family.
P. Steven Ainsley	2006–2009	
Christopher Mayer	2009–2014	
John W. Henry	2014–present	Purchased the paper from The New York Times; also owns the Boston Red Sox

=== Editors ===
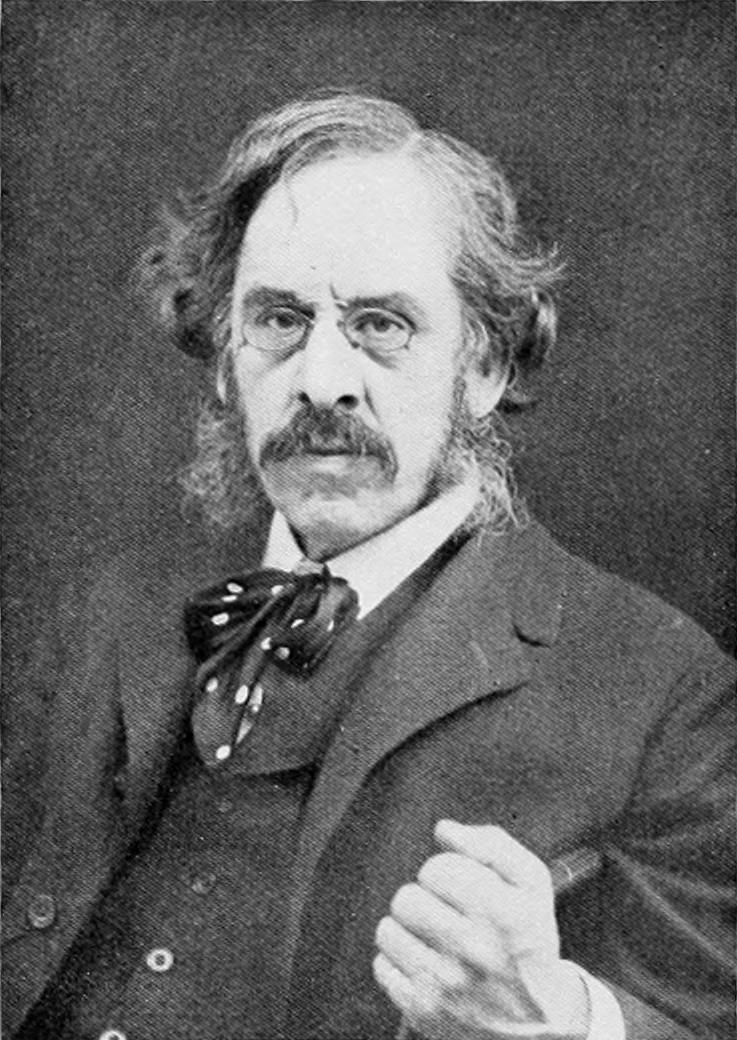
Edwin M. Bacon, editor from 1873 to 1878

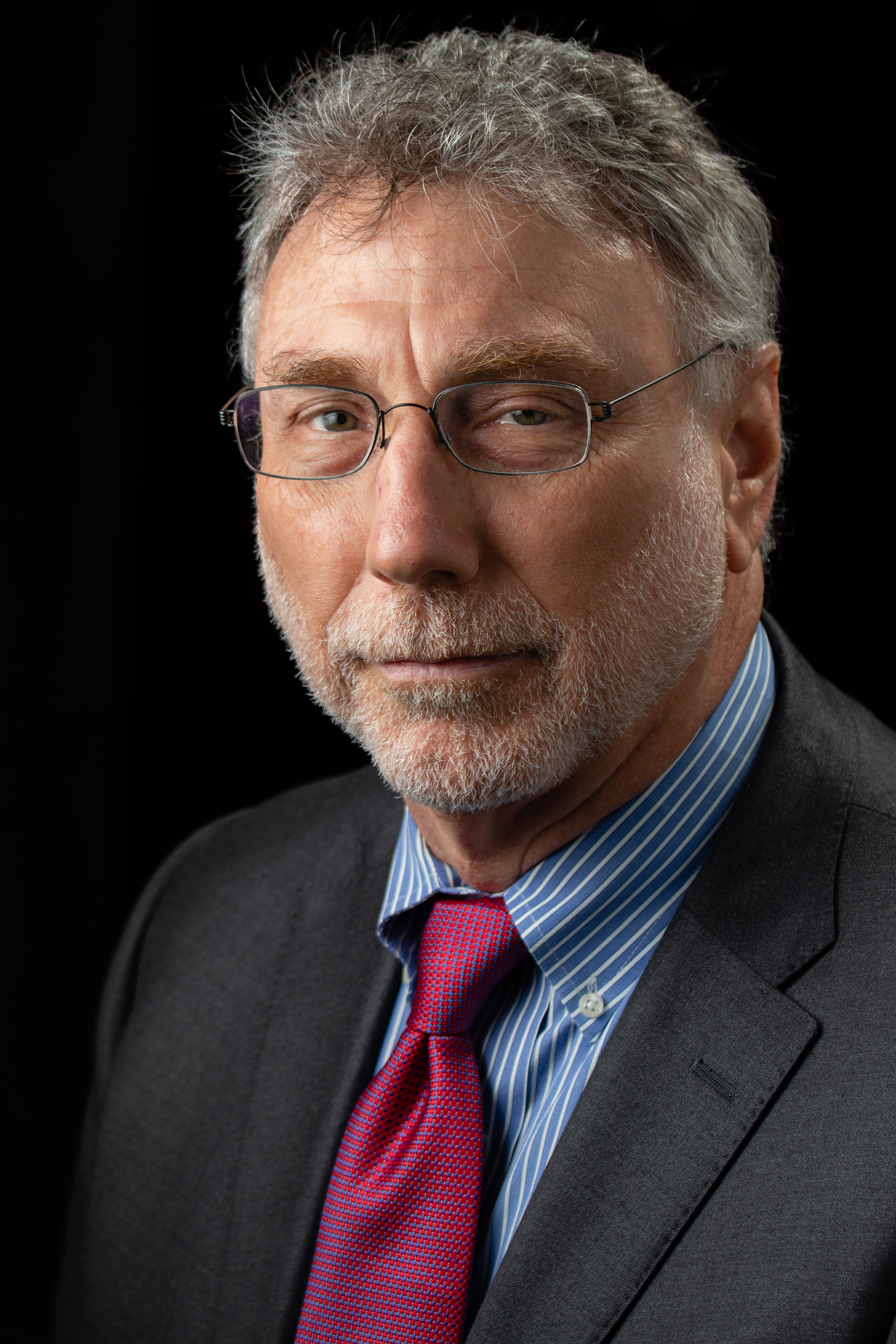
Martin Baron, editor from 2001 to 2012

The Globe uses "editor" as the highest title; other newspapers may call this role editor-in-chief. The role of editor was held by three people in the earliest years of the paper, then from 1880 to 1955 by the publishers. The extended period of a publisher-editor ended in 1955, when Laurence L. Winship was named editor by publisher William Davis Taylor. Winship became the paper's top editor following the death of James Morgan, longtime de facto executive editor. Morgan had joined the Globe in January 1884, hired by Charles H. Taylor.

- Maturin Murray Ballou (1872–1873)
- Edwin M. Bacon (1873–1878)
- Edwin C. Bailey (1878–1880)
- Charles H. Taylor (1880–1921) publisher
- William O. Taylor (1921–1955) publisher
- Laurence L. Winship (1955–1965)
- Thomas Winship (1965–1984)
- Michael C. Janeway (1984–1986)
- John S. Driscoll (1986–1993)
- Matthew V. Storin (1993–2001)
- Martin Baron (2001–2012)
- Brian McGrory (2012–2023)
- Nancy Barnes (2023–2025)
- Brian McGrory (2026–present)

== Incidents of fabrication and plagiarism ==
In 1998, columnist Patricia Smith was forced to resign after it was discovered that she had fabricated people and quotations in several of her columns. In August of that year, columnist Mike Barnicle was discovered to have copied material for a column from a George Carlin book, Brain Droppings. He was suspended for this offense, and his past columns were reviewed. The Boston Globe editors found that Barnicle had fabricated a story about two cancer patients, and Barnicle was forced to resign. Columnist Jeff Jacoby was suspended by the Globe in 2000 for failing to fully credit non-original content used in his column. The Globe was careful not to label it plagiarism, as in fact Jacoby had explained in his emailed version that his column represented a corrected version of similar, well-known pieces which had been written on the topic for over a century. The Globe in fact received sharp criticism over what was perceived in many quarters as an over-reaction in this case.

In 2004, the Globe apologized for printing graphic photographs that the article represented as showing U.S. soldiers raping Iraqi women during the Iraq War from a city councilor's presentation before they were verified. The photos had already been found by other news organizations to be from an internet pornography site.

In the spring of 2005, the Globe retracted a story describing the events of a seal hunt near Halifax, Nova Scotia, that took place on April 12, 2005. Written by freelancer Barbara Stewart, a former New York Times staffer, the article described the specific number of boats involved in the hunt and graphically described the killing of seals and the protests that accompanied it. In reality, weather had delayed the hunt, which had not yet begun the day the story had been filed, proving that the details were fabricated.

Columnist Kevin Cullen was suspended by the Globe in 2018 for embellishing claims he made on radio and in public appearances related to the Boston Marathon bombing.

== Websites ==
The Boston Globe maintains two distinct major websites: BostonGlobe.com is a subscriber-supported site with a paywall and content from the printed paper; and Boston.com, one of the first regional news portals, is supported by advertising. Between September 2011 and March 2014, the Globe gradually withdrew stories written by Globe journalists from Boston.com, making the sites more and more separated. BostonGlobe.com was designed to emphasize a premium experience focusing on content and emulating the visual appearance of The Boston Globe newspaper; the site was one of the first major websites to use a responsive design that automatically adapts its layout to a device's screen size. Boston.com followed suit in 2014. The two sites are aimed towards different readers; while Boston.com became targeted towards "casual" readers and local content, the new Boston Globe website is targeted towards the audience of the paper itself.

In 2012, the Society for News Design selected BostonGlobe.com as the world's best-designed news website.

=== Digital subscriptions ===
The Globe had 313,000 digital subscribers as of August 2026, among the highest of any metro newspapers in the country.

Boston Globe Media Partners, which owns the Globe, operates a number of websites covering certain niche subjects. The sites share many resources, like office space, with the Globe, but are often branded separately from the newspaper:

- Boston.com is a regional website that offers news and information about the Boston, Massachusetts area.
- Loveletters.boston.com is a love advice column run by Meredith Goldstein, an advice columnist and entertainment reporter for The Boston Globe.
- Realestate.boston.com is a regional website that offers advice on buying, selling, home improvement, and design with expert advice, insider neighborhood knowledge, the latest listings to buy or rent, and a window into the world of luxury living.

=== Crux ===
Crux was launched by the Globe in September 2014 to focus on news related to the Catholic Church. At the end of March 2016, The Globe ended its association with Crux, transferring ownership of the website to the Crux staff. With John L. Allen Jr. as the new editor, Crux received sponsorship from the Knights of Columbus and several Catholic dioceses.

=== Stat ===
Stat, launched in 2015, covers health, medicine and life sciences, with a particular focus on the biotechnology industry based in and around Boston. Stat employs journalists in Boston, Washington, D.C., New York City and San Francisco.

=== The Emancipator ===
The Emancipator, launched in 2022 in partnership with Boston University, covers racial justice. The Globe's involvement ended in March 2023.

== See also ==
- List of awards won by Boston Globe Media
- List of newspapers in Massachusetts
- Boston Evening Transcript
- Boston Daily Advertiser
- Boston Herald
- The Boston Journal
- The Boston Post
- The Boston Record
- WLVI, a television station the Globe held half-ownership of from 1966 to 1974
