= Residences of Donald Trump =

Donald Trump grew up in Jamaica Estates, an affluent neighborhood in Queens, New York City. In 1971, Trump moved into a studio in Manhattan. From 1983 until 2019, Trump's primary residence was the three-level penthouse on the top floors of Trump Tower; in 2019, he declared Mar-a-Lago in Palm Beach, Florida, to be his primary residence. During his presidencies, Trump has resided and resides at the White House in Washington, D.C.

== Current residences ==
=== White House ===
Donald Trump first lived at the presidential mansion, the White House in Washington, D.C., during his first presidency (January 20, 2017—January 20, 2021). His wife Melania and their son Barron remained at Trump Tower until the end of Barron's 2016–2017 school year. Donald Trump began living in the White House again during his second presidency (since January 20, 2025).

=== Mar-a-Lago ===
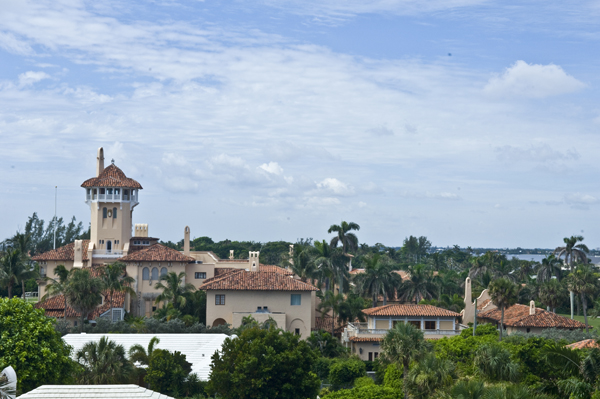
Mar-a-Lago

Since September 2019, Trump's resort and residence Mar-a-Lago has served as the primary residence for Donald and Melania Trump. The legality of this has been disputed because, in 1993, Trump signed a "use agreement" with the Town of Palm Beach, Florida, that changed Mar-a-Lago's designation from a single-family residence to a private club. The agreement specified that guests, including Trump, could not stay there for more than three non-consecutive weeks per year.

=== Trump Tower penthouse ===
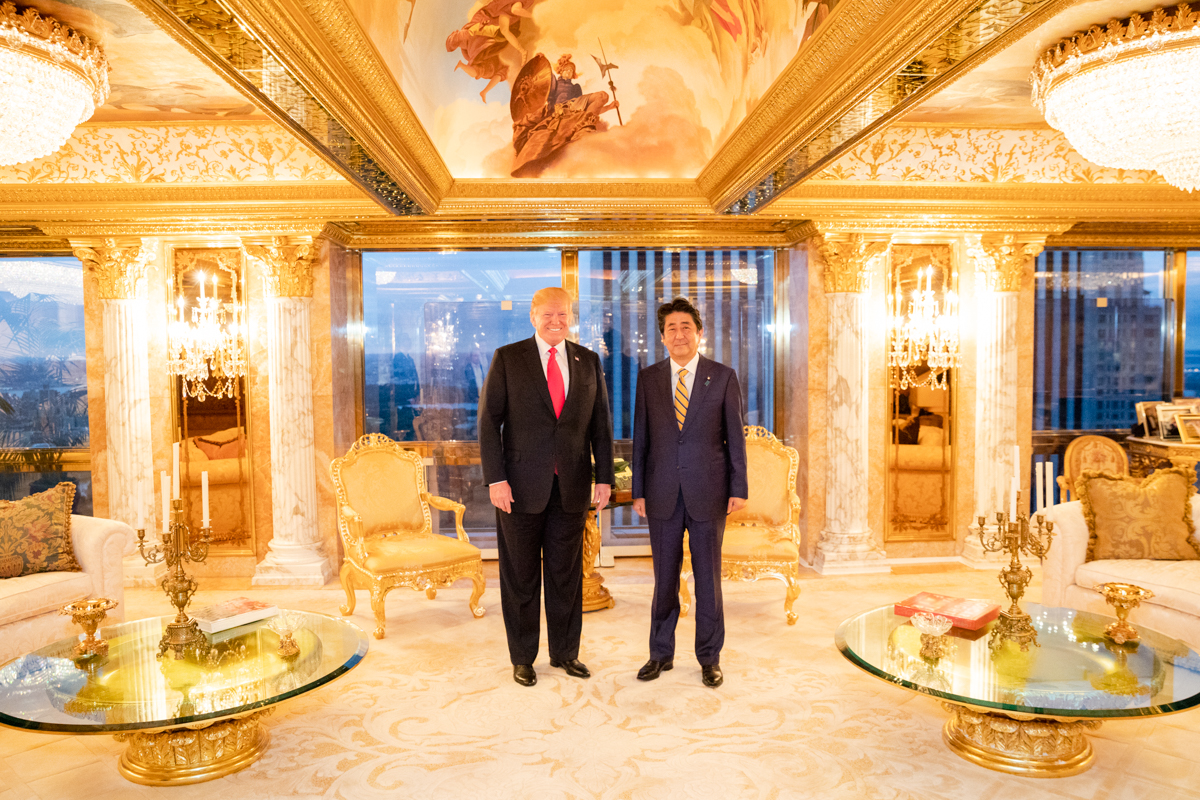
Trump and Japanese prime minister Shinzō Abe in the penthouse, 2018

The three-story penthouse at Trump Tower in Manhattan was Trump's primary residence from November 1983 until September 2019, when he designated Mar-a-Lago as his primary residence. In 2017, Forbes magazine estimated the 11,000-square-foot (1,000 m^{2}) penthouse to be worth $64 million. The interior was originally designed by Angelo Donghia with black lacquered walls, brass, and mahogany but was later redesigned in Louis XIV-era style with gold-trimmed furniture, marble floors, columns, tables, and walls, frescoed ceilings, bronze statues, and crystal chandeliers.

=== Trump National Golf Club Bedminster ===
A house on the premises in New Jersey is restrained for Trump's exclusive use, and a 500-square-foot (46 m^{2}), two-story balcony and porch were added to it in 2017. In 2017, the place was designated as Trump's third presidential residence.

== Other real estate holdings ==
=== Seven Springs ===
Trump owns a 28,322-square-foot (2,631.2 m^{2}) mansion on 201 acres (81 ha) in Bedford and New Castle, New York. The mansion has sixty rooms, including thirteen bedrooms, twelve baths, and an indoor pool of white marble. There are two other pools on the grounds, as well as a glass and stone orangery for growing citrus, with a bowling alley in its basement. The grounds are accented with a formal garden pavilion, a fountain in the front lawn, a greenhouse and root cellar, and a stone water tower. The property also contains a Tudor Revival house known as "Nonesuch", formerly owned by the Heinz family.

The mansion was built in 1919 of sandstone from the property to a design by architect Charles A. Platt as a summer home for financier Eugene Meyer and his family. Meyer spent $2 million on the construction. Meyer died in 1959, and, after his wife's death in 1970, the family foundation gave 247 acres (100 ha) of land to the Nature Conservancy and the rest of the property first to Yale University and then to Rockefeller University, which used it as a conference center. Trump bought the property in 1995 for $7.5 million. The mansion was in need of renovation, but Eric Trump and Donald Trump Jr. spent summers and weekends at the property, living in one of the carriage houses. Trump's tax records showed he classified the estate as an investment property which enables property taxes to be written off.

==== Development plans ====
Trump originally planned to build a golf course on the property, but was opposed by the governments of the three municipalities the property lies within, and he wanted to avoid competing with his existing course nearby in Briarcliff Manor. He later explored renovating the two houses and redeveloping the rest of the property. He initially proposed to build 46 single-family houses which were also opposed by the communities. He then proposed to build 15 mansions he intended to sell for $25 million each; he abandoned this project after years of litigation.

==== Conservation easement, tax deductions ====
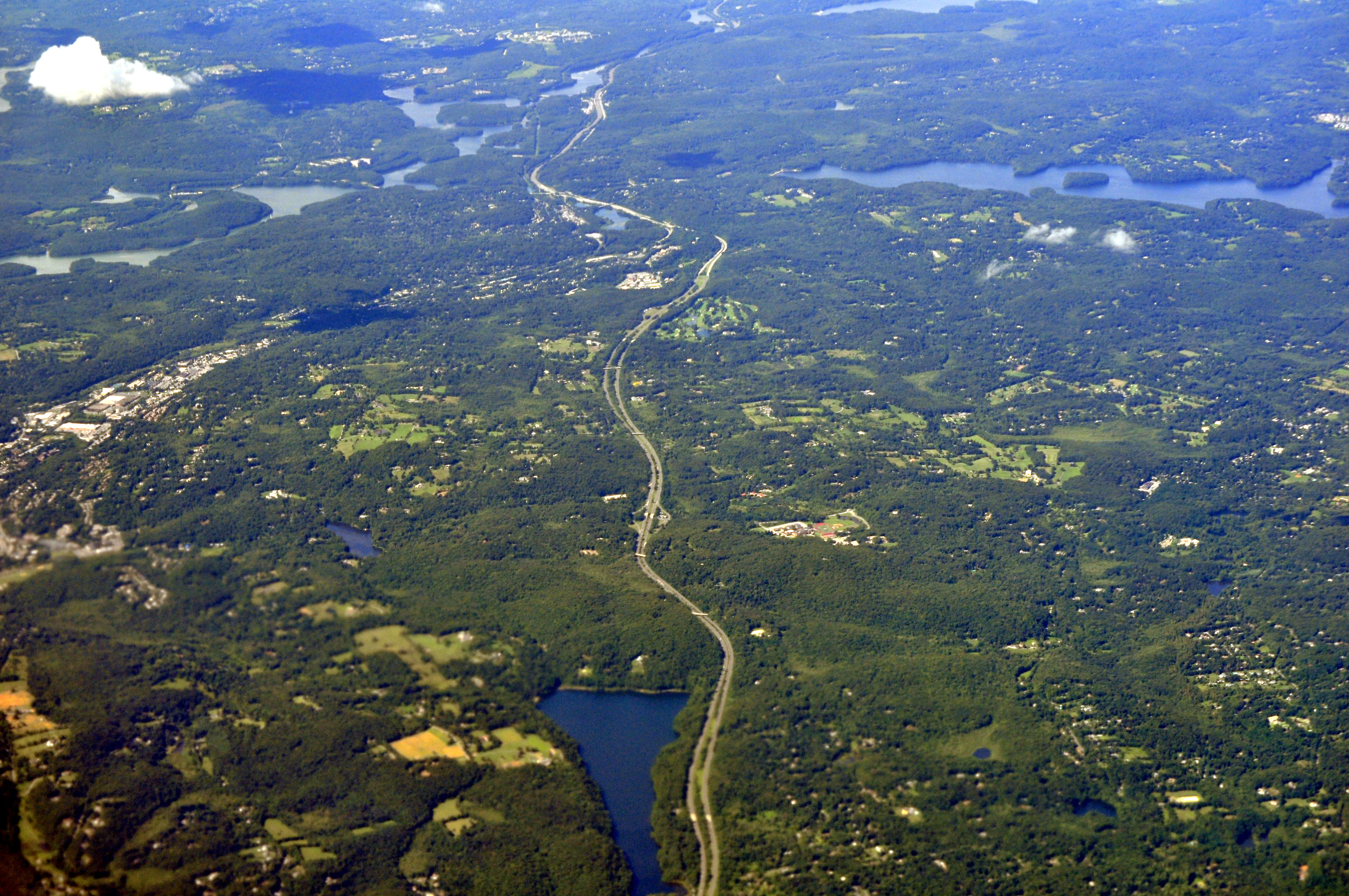
Seven Springs is the clearing to the left of Byram Lake Reservoir at the bottom of this photo.

In 2015, Trump granted a conservation easement to a conservation land trust and claimed a $21.1 million tax deduction. In 2020, the New York Times reported that Trump had classified the estate as an investment property in 2014 for tax purposes, allowing him to take a $2.2 million property tax deduction for which he would have been ineligible if the mansion was used as a personal residence.

In 2021 the estate continues to be the subject of two New York state investigations regarding the possible manipulation of the property’s value for tax purposes.

=== Trump Parc ===
Donald Trump developed the 38-story Trump Parc condominium skyscraper at 106 Central Park South, and often privately owns multiple units within it, which he rents for up to $100,000 a month.

=== Trump Park Avenue ===
Trump has several apartments at Trump Park Avenue. The penthouse, which was owned by Trump and where his daughter Ivanka and her family lived from 2011 until January 2017, was sold to Chinese-American businesswoman Angela Chen for $15.9 million in February 2017.

=== Château des Palmiers ===
Bought in 2013 by Trump, and located in Terres Basses in the French part of Saint Martin, Château des Palmiers is a beachfront estate on Plum Bay (Baie aux Prunes in French). In 2017, the estate was put on the market for $28 million; three months later, the asking price was reduced to $16 million, bringing it more in line with comparable St. Martin properties. In 2024, the property was listed for sale for $15.5 million.

=== Trump Vineyard Estates ===
Trump owns a 45-room 23,000-square-foot (2,100 m^{2}) mansion at Trump Vineyard Estates near Charlottesville, Virginia.

== Former residences ==
=== Queens ===
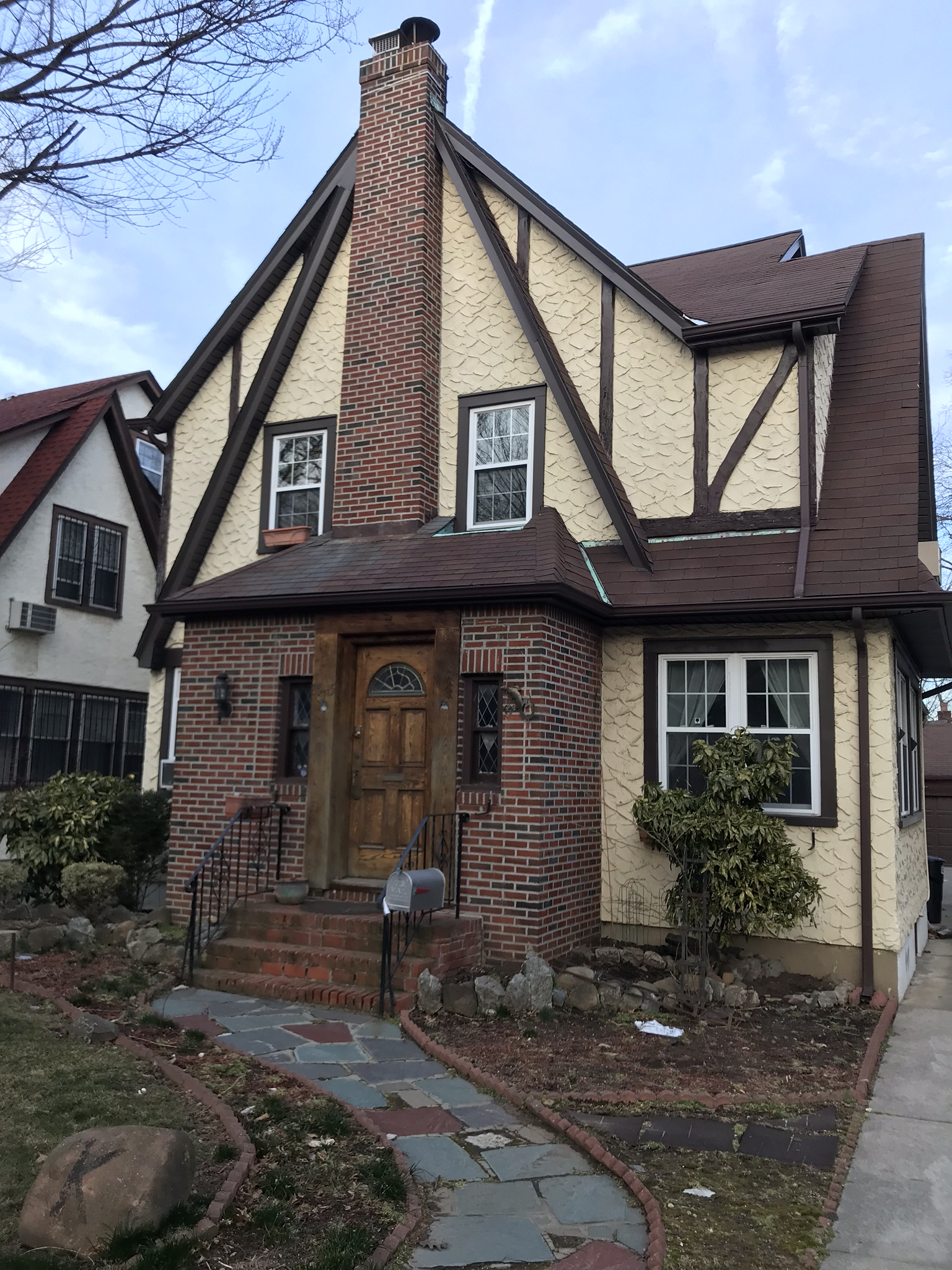
85-15 Wareham Place, where Trump lived until he was four

Until he was four years old, Trump's family lived at 85-15 Wareham Place in Jamaica Estates, an affluent neighborhood in Queens, New York City. The house, a six-bedroom Tudor-style, was built in either the 1920s or in 1940 (sources differ) by Trump's father, Fred Trump, a real estate developer. During the presidential campaign, the house was put up for sale in July 2016 by an unnamed New York restaurateur. Initially listed at $1.65 million, the house was purchased by Manhattan real-estate investor Michael Davis for almost $1.4 million in December 2016. According to The New York Times, the house was sold in March 2017 for $2.14 million to "a limited-liability company represented by a law firm that specializes in Chinese foreign investment". In 2017, the house was listed for $725-a-night rentals on Airbnb. After an attempt to sell it for $2.9 million in February 2019, an auction set to conclude that November failed as no qualified bids were made. In March 2025, a developer bought the house for $835,000 and spent over $500,000 renovating it. It was relisted for just over $2 million, and in July 2026 a buyer entered an agreement to purchase it for $1.93 million.

In 1950, Trump's family moved into a 23-room, 9-bathroom mansion, also built by Fred Trump, at 85-14 Midland Parkway on the other side of the same block, on two adjoining lots directly behind the backyard of the house on Wareham Place. Trump's parents lived in the mansion for the rest of their lives. Trump lived there until he was sent to boarding school at age 13, while attending Fordham University from 1964 to 1966, and, after graduating from the University of Pennsylvania, from 1968 to 1971.

=== School living ===
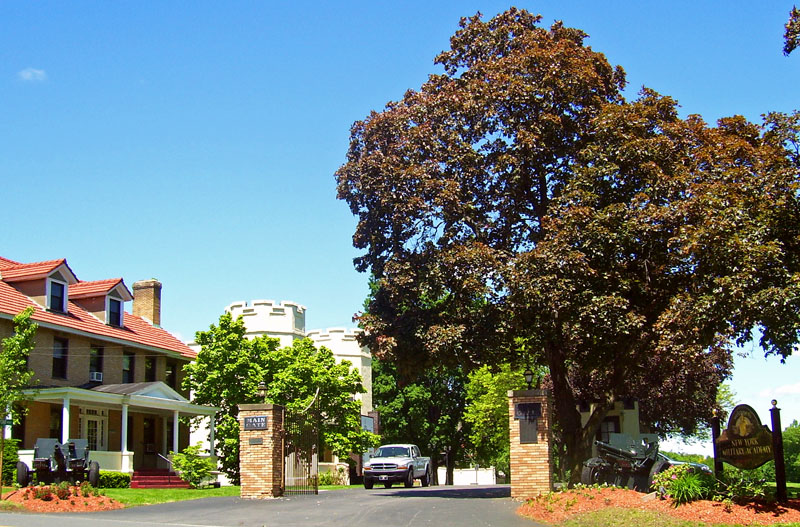
New York Military Academy

Beginning at age 13, Trump attended and resided at New York Military Academy, a private boarding school in Cornwall, New York. He lived with his parents while attending Fordham University in New York City for two years from 1964 to 1966 and in rented off-campus row houses in Philadelphia while attending the University of Pennsylvania from 1966 to 1968.

=== Manhattan ===
==== Studio on 75th Street ====
Trump's first apartment in Manhattan was a small rent-controlled studio on the 17th floor of 196 East 75th Street, a 22-story building. He referred to it as the penthouse.

==== 'The Phoenix' and Olympic Tower ====
By 1976, Trump was living in a three-bedroom penthouse apartment at 'The Phoenix', a luxury apartment building at 160 East 65th Street on the Upper East Side of Manhattan. The apartment had large panoramic windows and was decorated in beige, brown, and chrome. He next moved into an apartment on the 41st floor of Olympic Tower at 641 Fifth Avenue across from St. Patrick's Cathedral.

==== 800 Fifth Avenue ====
After the birth of Donald and Ivana Trump's first child, the family moved into an eight-room apartment at 800 Fifth Avenue. One source says the apartment was in an old mansion, a second described it as "an aerie" with a solarium, beige wall-to-wall carpets, beige upholstery, and huge corner windows. Ivana Trump furnished the apartment with beige sectional sofas, mirrors "framed with twinkling lights", and dining tables covered with goatskin.

=== Greenwich mansion ===
Trump purchased a 20,000-square-foot (1,900 m^{2}) mansion in Greenwich, Connecticut, in 1982 for $4 million. The house had eight bedrooms, eleven baths, a 4,000 square feet (370 m^{2}) guest house, a putting green and tennis court, indoor and outdoor pools, and a sauna. Ivana Trump received the mansion as part of the settlement in 1991 in her divorce from Donald Trump. She sold it for $15 million in 1998.

=== Beverly Hills ===
Trump owned a five-bedroom mansion on North Canon Drive in Beverly Hills, California, from 2007 to 2019. He had originally purchased it for $7 million, and claimed the house was worth $6 million for tax purposes. Trump had rarely used it, and had put on the market and rented it out at different times. In June 2019, he quietly sold the property, off-market, for $13.5 million to Hillcrest Asia Limited, a company owned by a Trump associate, Indonesian billionaire Hary Tanoesoedibjo.

From 2008 to 2009, Trump owned a neighboring house, an 11-bedroom Greek Revival mansion built in 1981. Trump purchased it for $10.35 million, but sold it for $9.5 million. It was previously a residence of Gabonese president Omar Bongo, who died in office in 2009.

== See also ==
- List of residences of presidents of the United States

== Works cited ==
- Kranish, Michael; Fisher, Marc (2017) [First published 2016]. Trump Revealed: The Definitive Biography of the 45th President. Simon & Schuster. ISBN 978-1-5011-5652-6.
  - Blair, Gwenda (2015) [2000]. The Trumps: Three Generations of Builders and a President. Simon & Schuster. ISBN 978-0-7432-1079-9.
