= Martin Baron =

American journalist (born 1954)

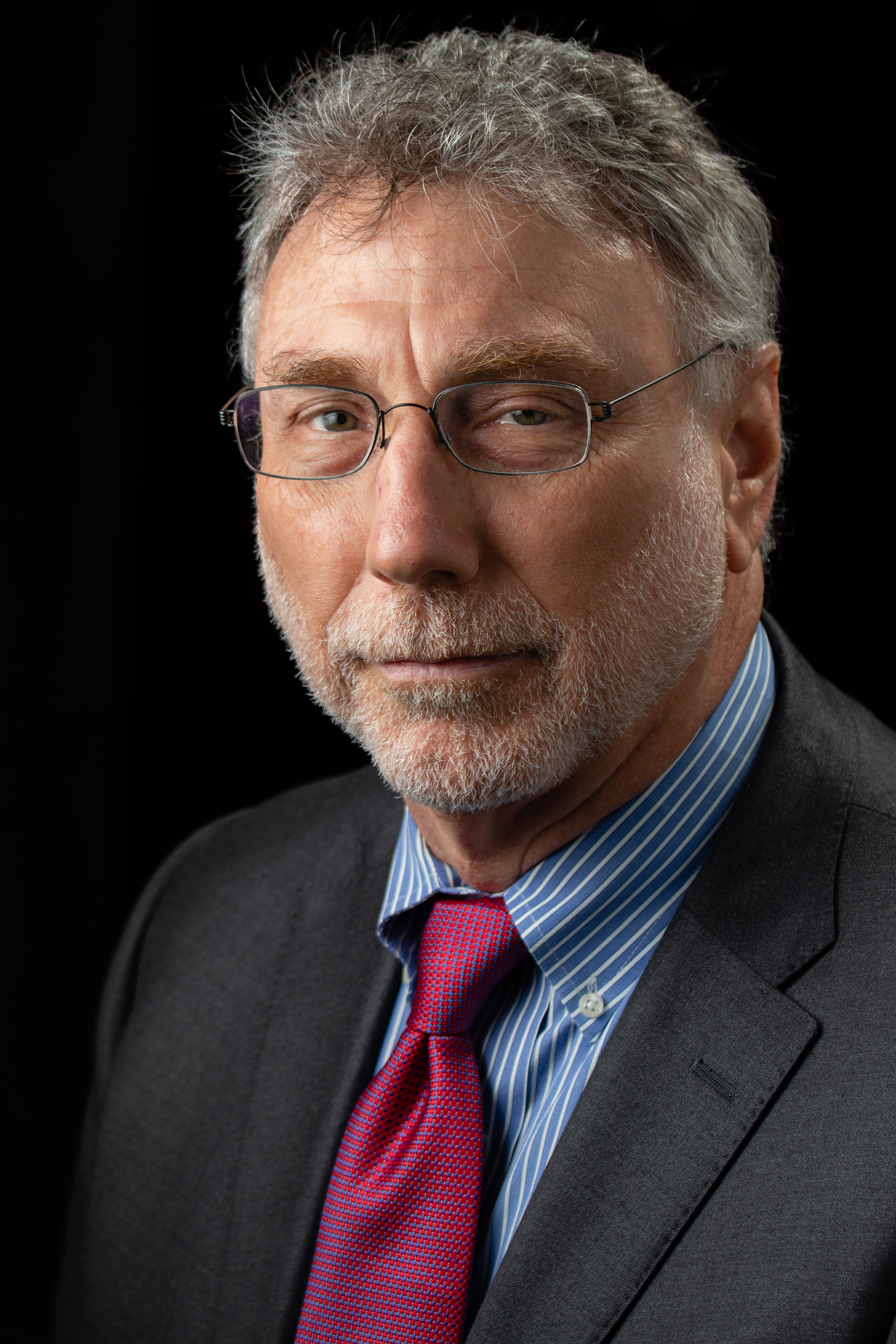
- Baron in 2018
- Born: October 24, 1954 (age 71); Tampa, Florida, U.S.
- Education: Lehigh University (BA and MBA)
- Notable credit(s): The Boston Globe, The New York Times, The Washington Post, The Los Angeles Times, The Miami Herald

Martin Baron (born October 24, 1954) is an American journalist who was editor of The Washington Post from December 31, 2012, until his retirement on February 28, 2021. He was previously editor of The Boston Globe from 2001 to 2012; during that period, the Globe's coverage of the Boston Catholic sexual abuse scandal earned a Pulitzer Prize.

== Early life and education ==
Baron was born to a Jewish family in Tampa, Florida. His parents emigrated from Israel. He attended Berkeley Preparatory School in Tampa, where he worked on the school's student paper.

Baron attended Lehigh University in Bethlehem, Pennsylvania, where he was editor of The Brown and White student newspaper and had his own column. He received special permission to take graduate classes as an undergraduate and graduated in 1976, earning a Bachelor of Arts in journalism and MBA with honors in four years.

Baron is fluent in Spanish.

== Career ==
In 1976, after graduation, Baron began working for The Miami Herald. In 1979, he moved to The Los Angeles Times. In 1996, he joined The New York Times. Baron returned to the Miami Herald as executive editor in 2000, where he led coverage of several key stories, including Elián González's return to Cuba and the 2000 election.

=== The Boston Globe ===
In July 2001, Baron succeeded Matthew V. Storin as executive editor of The Boston Globe. His editorial term at The Globe shifted the paper's coverage from international events toward locally centered investigative journalism. The Globe's coverage of the Boston Catholic sexual abuse scandal earned a Pulitzer Prize in 2003.

In 2012, Baron was inducted into the American Academy of Arts and Sciences.

=== The Washington Post ===
In January 2013, Baron succeeded Marcus Brauchli as executive editor of The Washington Post. In 2014, the Post won two Pulitzer Prizes, one in the category of public service for revelations of secret surveillance by the National Security Agency and the other for explanatory journalism about food stamps in America. The following year, in 2015, the newspaper won a Pulitzer Prize for national reporting for its coverage of security lapses in the Secret Service; in 2016, it won the Pulitzer Prize in the category of national reporting for a groundbreaking project that chronicled every killing by a police officer in 2015. The following year, in 2016, it won the Pulitzer Prize for national reporting for exposing Donald Trump's exaggerated claims of charitable giving and the Access Hollywood tape. In 2018, it won two Pulitzer Prizes, one in the category of investigative reporting for revealing allegations of sexual misconduct by Roy Moore and the other for national reporting on Russian interference in the 2016 presidential election.

Baron supervised the writing team, including Michael Kranish and Marc Fisher, who authored the 2016 biography Trump Revealed: An American Journey of Ambition, Ego, Money, and Power.

For his work in journalism, Baron was awarded the 2016 Hitchens Prize. In 2017, he received the Al Neuharth Award for Excellence in Media.

In May 2019, Baron defended WikiLeaks founder Julian Assange, saying, "Dating as far back as the Pentagon Papers case and beyond, journalists have been receiving and reporting on information that the government deemed classified. Wrongdoing and abuse of power were exposed. With the new indictment of Julian Assange, the government is advancing a legal argument that places such important work in jeopardy and undermines the very purpose of the First Amendment."

In January 2020, Baron criticized a Post reporter who sent a Tweet about the Kobe Bryant sexual assault case after Bryant's death. The reporter, Felicia Sonmez, was later suspended. However, The Washington Post guild criticized the move and she was subsequently reinstated. Baron issued a three-page statement but did not apologize.

In January 2021, Baron announced his retirement from The Washington Post effective February 28, 2021. In his note, he advocated for Section 230 protections for social media companies.

In October 2024, Baron spoke out emphatically against The Washington Post's decision to not endorse a Presidential candidate for the first time since 1988, calling it "cowardice, with democracy as its casualty".

== Popular culture ==
In the 2015 film Spotlight, which focuses on The Boston Globe's coverage of the Catholic Church's sexual abuse scandal, Baron is played by Liev Schreiber. The film won Best Picture at the 88th Academy Awards.

== Books ==
- Baron, Martin (3 October 2023). Collision of Power: Trump, Bezos, and The Washington Post. New York: Flatiron Books. ISBN 9781250844200. OCLC 1380465038.

Preceded by Matthew V. Storin	Editor of The Boston Globe; 2001–2012	Succeeded by Brian McGrory
Preceded by Marcus Brauchli	Executive Editor of The Washington Post; 2012–2021	Succeeded by Sally Buzbee
