= Trump Revealed =

2016 biography of Donald Trump by Michael Kranish and Marc Fisher

Trump Revealed: An American Journey of Ambition, Ego, Money, and Power
- First edition cover
- Authors: Michael Kranish; Marc Fisher
- Audio read by: Campbell Scott
- Original title: Trump Revealed: An American Journey of Ambition, Ego, Money, and Power
- Subject: Donald Trump
- Publisher: Scribner, Simon & Schuster
- Publication date: August 23, 2016
- Publication place: United States
- Media type: Print (hardcover)
- Pages: 448
- Awards: New York Times Bestseller; The Washington Post Bestseller; The Philadelphia Inquirer Best Book of the Year; Los Angeles Times Most Important Book of the Year
- ISBN: 978-1-5011-5577-2
- Website: washingtonpost.com/trumprevealed

Trump Revealed: An American Journey of Ambition, Ego, Money, and Power is a biography of Donald Trump, written by Michael Kranish and Marc Fisher. It was first published in 2016 in hardcover format by Scribner. It was released in ebook format that year and paperback format in 2017 under the title Trump Revealed: The Definitive Biography of the 45th President. The book was a collaborative research project by The Washington Post, supervised by the newspaper's editor Marty Baron and consisting of contributions from thirty-eight journalists, and two fact-checkers. Trump initially refused to be interviewed for the book, then relented, and subsequently raised the possibility of a libel lawsuit against the authors. After the book was completed, Trump urged his Twitter followers not to buy it.

The biography discusses the entirety of Trump's life, from his upbringing, his time in military school, to his early experience in real estate investing under his father Fred Trump. Kranish and Fisher delve into Trump's ventures to establish himself in real estate in New York City, and his efforts to become a famous celebrity. They discuss Trump's first meeting with lawyer Roy Cohn, who advised him to always attack as a public relations strategy. The book recounts Trump's usage of pseudonyms "John Barron" and "John Miller" in order to increase his own fame and standing, and discusses his successes and failures in business, and his increased celebrity through The Apprentice. The biography provides an overview of major events from the 2016 U.S. presidential campaign, including Trump's false comments about Mexican rapists, his conflict with journalist Megyn Kelly, and sexual misconduct assertions made by women against Trump. The work concludes with the 2016 Republican National Convention.

Trump Revealed was a commercial success, making the New York Times Bestseller list and The Washington Post Bestseller list. The Philadelphia Inquirer listed it as a Best Book of the Year, and the Los Angeles Times called it a Most Important Book of the Year. Booklist called the biography "[t]he most definitive book about Trump to date." The New York Times characterized research for the work as "vigorously reported". The Boston Globe described it as "likely the most complete and nuanced life of Trump thus far". Regarding the book's writing style, USA Today called it a "compelling narrative". Kirkus Reviews praised what they saw as the neutral point of view seen in the authors' journalistic objectivity.

== Contents summary ==
Trump Revealed presents a biography of Donald Trump, from his early life through his 2016 U.S. presidential campaign. The book discusses his genealogy and his formative upbringing. The authors provide context for Trump's time spent as a cadet in military high school. Kranish and Fisher subsequently discuss the youth's time gaining experience within his paternal example Fred Trump's real estate investing ventures.

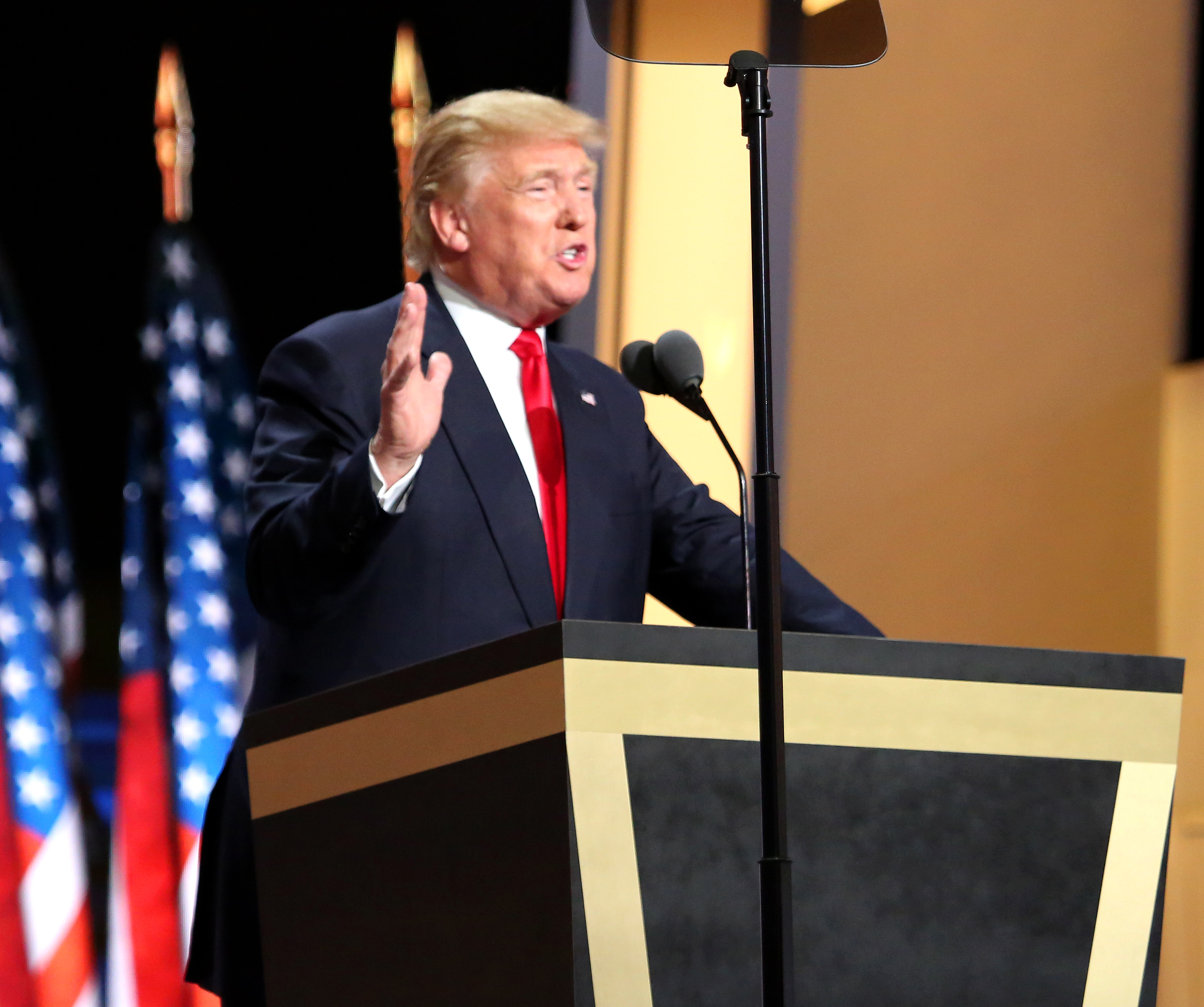
Donald Trump at the 2016 Republican National Convention

The authors focus on their subject's attempts to garner success in his own right while investing in real estate ventures in Manhattan. Throughout the work, Kranish and Fisher discuss Trump's motivation to increase his financial standing and gain more fame. Roy Cohn meets Trump in 1973, and Trump is allowed entry into the Manhattan facility "Le Club" after assuring its owners he will not pursue married women in the establishment. Trump first encounters Cohn at the club, and informs him of his troubles being sued for racial discrimination. Cohn instructs Trump on his style to countersue rather than settle a case. Cohn taught Trump to always attack, as a public relations and litigation tactic. Cohn subsequently became Trump's attorney and fixer for his New York operations.

Kranish and Fisher recount that Trump greatly derived pleasure from being featured in the gossip column of the New York Post called "Page Six". The book discusses Trump's usage of pseudonyms John Barron and John Miller as an attempt to appear more often in the newspaper. The authors point out, "Some reporters found the calls from Miller or Barron merely playful, if a bit weird. Others thought the calls were disturbing or even creepy, as Barron seems to take pleasure in describing how prominent women were drawn to Trump sexually."

Trump Revealed provides case studies of Trump's financial hits and misses, providing depth and background on each over time. More detail over and above a simple historical overview is provided by supplementing discussion of the subject's life with direct interviews with Trump himself. The book discusses Trump's role in the beauty pageant Miss Universe, and his practice of inspecting the attractiveness of potential candidates himself. Trump Revealed traces Trump's rise in fame to his role on the television show The Apprentice.

The authors describe an interview with Trump where they both came to see him at Trump Tower on Fifth Avenue. They ask him about his friends and social relationships. Trump reflects on the question and finds difficulty providing an answer, finally saying his business life did not provide sufficient time to develop lasting social friendships; instead he relies upon financial ties and acquaintances met during public fundraising events. He confidentially gave Kranish and Fisher names of three close male friends, with whom he had not spoken in years. The authors conclude Trump did not keep meaningful friendships aside from his close relatives.

Kranish and Fisher discuss in the final section of the biography, major events from Trump's 2016 campaign for the U.S. presidency. Significant incidents delved into within this portion of the book include Trump's immigration policy, including his false comments referring to citizens of Mexico as rapists. The authors recount sexual misconduct assertions made by women against Trump, and Trump's statement of blood pouring out of Megyn Kelly's "whatever" in response to a critical question from the journalist. The book concludes with the 2016 Republican National Convention.

== Composition and publication ==
Prior to his work on the book, author Michael Kranish had written biographical works on other presidential candidates John Kerry and Mitt Romney, with books John F. Kerry and The Real Romney. He wrote about president Thomas Jefferson in his book, Flight from Monticello: Thomas Jefferson at War. Kranish worked in the field of investigative journalism for The Boston Globe and subsequently The Washington Post. In 2016, Kranish received the Washington Correspondence Award from the Society of Professional Journalists. Kranish's coauthor, Marc Fisher, was his colleague at the time of the book's publication at The Washington Post where he served as senior editor. Fisher's prior books included After the Wall about German history, and Something in the Air about the history of radio. His contributions at The Washington Post garnered him the 2014 Pulitzer Prize for Public Service and 2016 Pulitzer Prize for National Reporting.

Trump Revealed coauthors

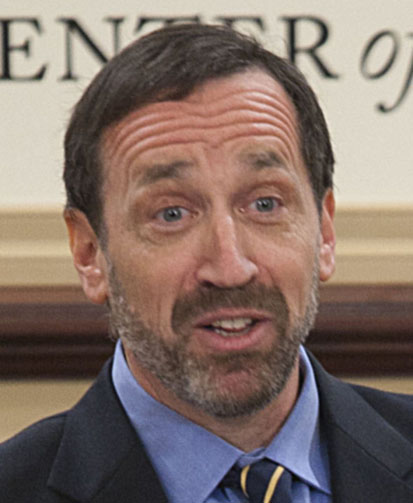
Michael Kranish

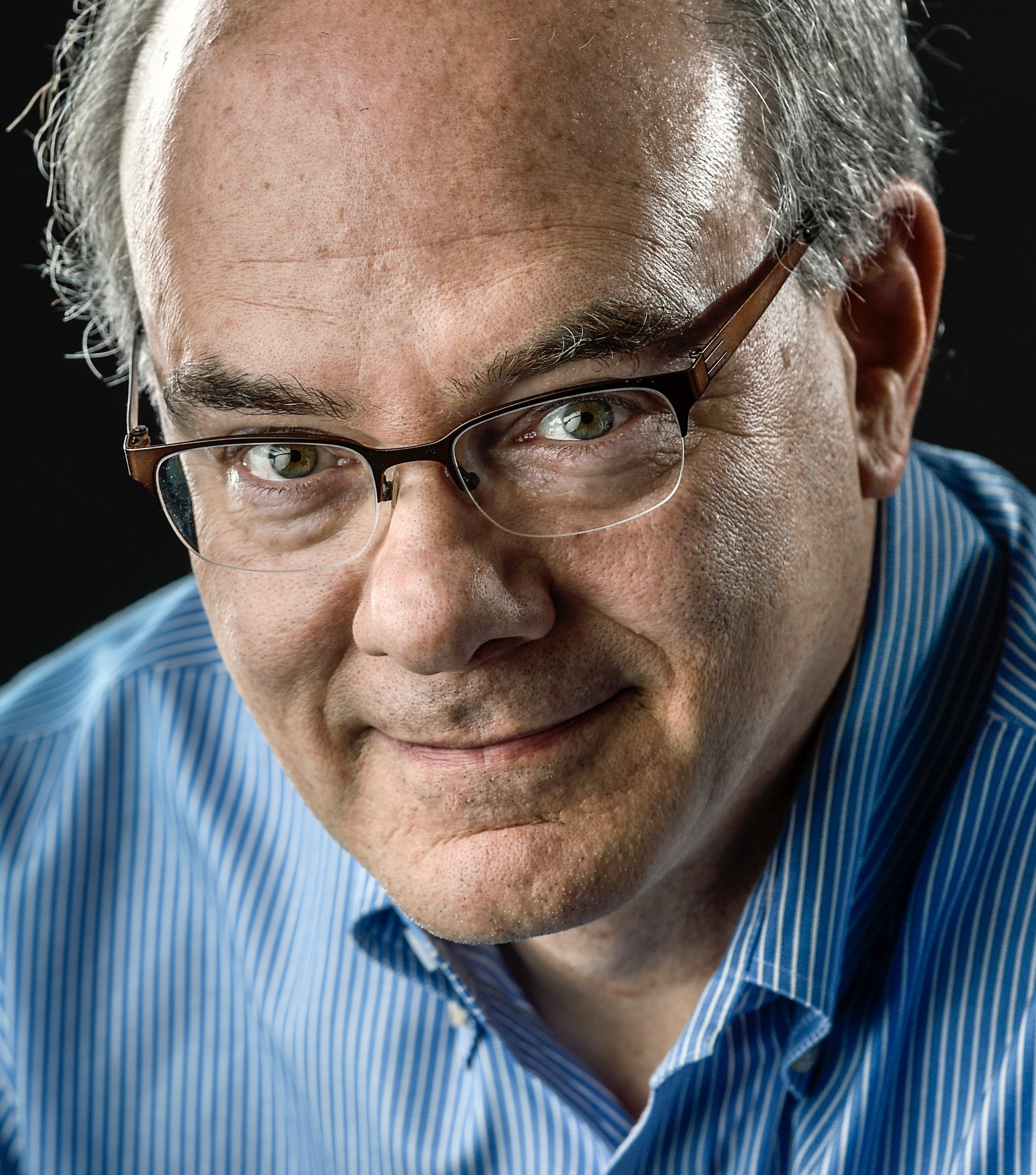
Marc Fisher

In addition to co-authors Kranish and Fisher, more than thirty-eight journalists, assistants, and members of The Washington Post editing staff contributed to research on Trump Revealed. Three editors were assigned to the project, in addition to two independent fact-checkers. Kranish and Fisher relied on investigative journalism by their colleagues at The Washington Post as the basis for the book. Research efforts for the book included twenty hours of interviews with Trump. During the course of their research for the book, The Washington Post was at the same time denied press credentials by the Trump presidential campaign. The writing process immediately prior to publication took three months.

Research by Kranish and Fisher for the book was supervised by The Washington Post editor Marty Baron. Baron was editor of The Boston Globe when it received the Pulitzer Prize for reporting on Boston Catholic sexual abuse scandal. While editor of The Washington Post, the paper was recognized with two Pulitzer Prizes in 2014 for reporting on National Security Agency surveillance and food stamps in America, one in 2015 about United States Secret Service security issues, and one in 2016 for reporting about all deaths caused by police in 2015. Baron said in 2016 about research for the book, "Given that he could ascend to the most powerful position in the world, Trump's life and career deserve to be explored in the greatest depth. That's what we intend to do, with a huge investment of reportorial and editing resources and with a staff that consistently has led the field in covering his volatile candidacy."

The 2016 Trump presidential campaign initially refused to allow the candidate to be interviewed; Trump was eventually interviewed by Kranish and Fisher. During the writing process for the book, Trump threatened a lawsuit against Kranish and Fisher, commenting in an interview, "And I will bring more libel suits—maybe against you folks." After the book's publication, Trump urged his Twitter followers not to purchase the biography. Trump posted in an August 2016 tweet, "The @WashingtonPost quickly put together a hit job book on me – comprised of copies of some of their inaccurate stories. Don't buy, boring!"

Trump Revealed was first published in 2016 in hardcover format by Scribner. It was released one month after the 2016 Republican National Convention. The Washington Post additionally made available on their website a large archive of research materials used in the composition of the biography, consisting of 400 documents. An audiobook of the same title was published that year by Simon & Schuster Audio, narrated by voice actor Campbell Scott, with total running time of 15 hours and 3 minutes. An ebook format was published the same year by Simon & Schuster, under the title, Trump Revealed: The Definitive Biography of the 45th President. A paperback edition was released by Scribner in 2017 under this title. A Dutch-language edition was published in 2017, and the book was published in English in London that year.

== Sales and reception ==
External videos
- Washington Journal interview with Kranish and Fisher on Trump Revealed, August 25. 2016, C-SPAN
- Panel discussion on Trump Revealed with Marty Baron, Marc Fisher, Mary Jordan, Michael Kranish, Robert O'Harrow Jr., and Robert Samuels, September 8, 2016, C-SPAN

Trump Revealed was a commercial success, making The New York Times Best Seller list in categories hardcover nonfiction, ebook nonfiction, and combined print and ebook nonfiction in September 2016. It remained on the list for hardcover for a second week. The biography made spot number three on the list of nonfiction best sellers by The Washington Post in September 2016. The Philadelphia Inquirer selected Trump Revealed as a "Best Book of the Year". The Los Angeles Times featured Trump Revealed as a "Most Important Book of the Year". In commenting on its selection, the Los Angeles Times observed, "As we look ahead to a Trump administration that appears particularly disinclined toward transparency, this book is all the more valuable in understanding how Trump, our president-elect, has behaved in the past as a manager, businessman and private person."

Booklist gave the work a favorable review by Ilene Cooper. Cooper called the biography, "The most definitive book about Trump to date." The New York Times wrote that the book was "vigorously reported", and adeptly chronicled Trump's "single-minded building of his gaudy brand and his often masterful manipulation of the media." The Boston Globe called the biography, "likely the most complete and nuanced life of Trump thus far". USA Today gave the book a rating of 3.5 stars out of 4, in a review by Ray Locker. He commented, "Talented writers Michael Kranish and Marc Fisher have taken the work of dozens of Post journalists and woven it into a compelling narrative." He praised the investigative journalism that went into research for the biography, "The best of investigative reporting is brought to bear on a man who could potentially lead the free world." Locker concluded, "They paint a sobering portrait that merits inspection."

Kirkus Reviews wrote that Trump Revealed served as a good confirmation of the book The Making of Donald Trump by David Cay Johnston; The Sydney Morning Herald concurred with this assessment. Kirkus Reviews praised what they saw as the neutral-point-of-view seen in the authors' journalistic objectivity to describing Trump in their biography, writing, "those willing and brave enough to dare these pages will find the authors' approach evenhanded, perhaps even overly so, in preference to allowing Trump plenty of rope—and suffice it to say that Trump unrolls miles of it." Writing for Vice, journalist Alex Thompson called the book, "347 well-reported pages". The Roanoke Times gave the book a favorable review, writing, "The book benefits greatly from the in-depth reporting so critical to Jeffersonian democracy in the day of the tweet, the blog and the self-congratulatory mockery of "fair and balanced" journalism."

Evan Thomas reviewed the book for The Washington Post, and favorably characterized the biography as: "Trump Revealed, a biography of the GOP's narcissistic nominee, quickly but deftly wrought by two excellent Post writers from deep reporting by a score of Post reporters". Thomas positively assessed the authors' neutrality in the book's tone, "the finished product is by no means a hatchet job." He concluded, "The many revealing scenes cohere into a fascinating portrait. ... Trump the outrageous poseur becomes sadder and more real in this fine book." Writing for New York Social Diary, journalist Liz Smith noted, "This was written by the excellent Washington Post journalists Michael Kranish and Marc Fisher and their teams of ardent researchers." She commented, "What this book really is, it's an astounding 'case study.'" Smith concluded, "I am struck dumb by the facts and the unfaltering research. I have never had an experience like it." The Times called Trump Revealed, "a skilful and meticulous stitch-together by Washington Post journalists". The Financial Express called the book, "researched and surprisingly even-handed".

Gavin Fernando of News.com.au characterized the database resource released the same month as the book by The Washington Post as "a massive 398-document archive on Donald Trump". Joshua Benton of the Nieman Foundation for Journalism at Harvard University called the practice of The Washington Post making its research for the biography available in this manner, "a welcome show of journalistic openness".

== See also ==
- Johnston, David Cay (2016). The Making of Donald Trump. Melville House Publishing. ISBN 978-1-61219-632-9.
- Nance, Malcolm (2016). The Plot to Hack America. Skyhorse Publishing. ISBN 978-1-5107-2332-0. OCLC 987592653.
- Lichtman, Allan J. (2017). The Case for Impeachment. Dey Street Books. ISBN 978-0-06-269682-3.
- Taibbi, Matt (2017). Insane Clown President. Spiegel & Grau. ISBN 978-0-399-59246-1.
