= Matthew V. Storin =

American journalist

- Born: December 24, 1942 (age 83); Springfield, Massachusetts
- Education: University of Notre Dame
- Occupations: Journalist, editor
- Employer: The Boston Globe
- Spouse: Keiko
- Children: 4

Matthew Victor Storin (born December 24, 1942) is an American journalist who served as editor of The Boston Globe from 1993 to 2001.

== Biography ==
=== Career ===
Storin was born and raised in Springfield, Massachusetts, and earned a degree in sociology from the University of Notre Dame in 1964. He began his journalism career at his hometown newspaper, the Daily News of Springfield. In 1965, he joined the Griffin-Larrabee News Bureau in Washington D.C., where he was a political reporter until he joined The Boston Globe staff in 1969. Storin initially covered Congress and the White House for the Globe, and later served in a number of positions, including City editor. He served as Asian bureau chief during 1974–75, where his reportage included covering the last stages of the war in Vietnam and Cambodia. Storin left the Globe in 1985, following a dispute with then-editor Michael C. Janeway.

During his hiatus from the Globe, 1985–1992, Storin worked at U.S. News & World Report, then became editor of the Chicago Sun-Times and later the Maine Times. In 1989, he joined the New York Daily News as managing editor. Storin returned to the Globe as executive editor in 1992, and became editor in March 1993. He held the post until 2001, when he was succeeded by Martin Baron.

Following his retirement from the Globe, Storin was a fellow at Harvard's Joan Shorenstein Center on the Press, Politics and Public Policy in the John F. Kennedy School of Government. He subsequently served as associate vice president for news and information at the University of Notre Dame, in South Bend, Indiana, where he taught courses in journalism and ethics. Having retired for one year, Storin was named Notre Dame's Chief Communications Executive on June 8, 2012. He left Notre Dame in 2014 and retired to Camden, Maine. In 2019, he was elected president of the Camden Conference after having served as vice-president to the Conference for two years. The Camden Conference is a 501(c)(3) organization that, among other activities, has held a renowned global citizens forum annually for more than 30 years.

=== Personal life ===
Storin is married to Keiko T. Storin, and has four children, including three from an earlier marriage. During Storin's time at The Boston Globe, one of his colleagues was Michael Dobbs, a former British politician. Dobbs went on to write House of Cards and subsequent political thrillers, which featured a character named after Storin, Mattie Storin.

Preceded by John S. Driscoll	Editor of The Boston Globe; 1993–2001	Succeeded by Martin Baron
