= Melville House Publishing =

American independent publisher

- Founded: 2001; 25 years ago
- Founder: Dennis Loy Johnson and Valerie Merians
- Country of origin: United States
- Headquarters location: Brooklyn, New York City
- Distribution: Penguin Random House Publisher Services (US); Turnaround Publisher Services (UK)
- Publication types: Books
- Official website: www.mhpbooks.com

Melville House Publishing is an American independent publisher based in Brooklyn, New York City, publishing literary fiction, non-fiction, and poetry. The company was founded in 2001 in Hoboken, New Jersey, and named in honor of author Herman Melville. It has a reputation as an "activist press" of left-leaning books, known for "crashing" pivotal public documents, as well as for publishing literary fiction, debut authors, and socially engaged non-fiction.

== History ==
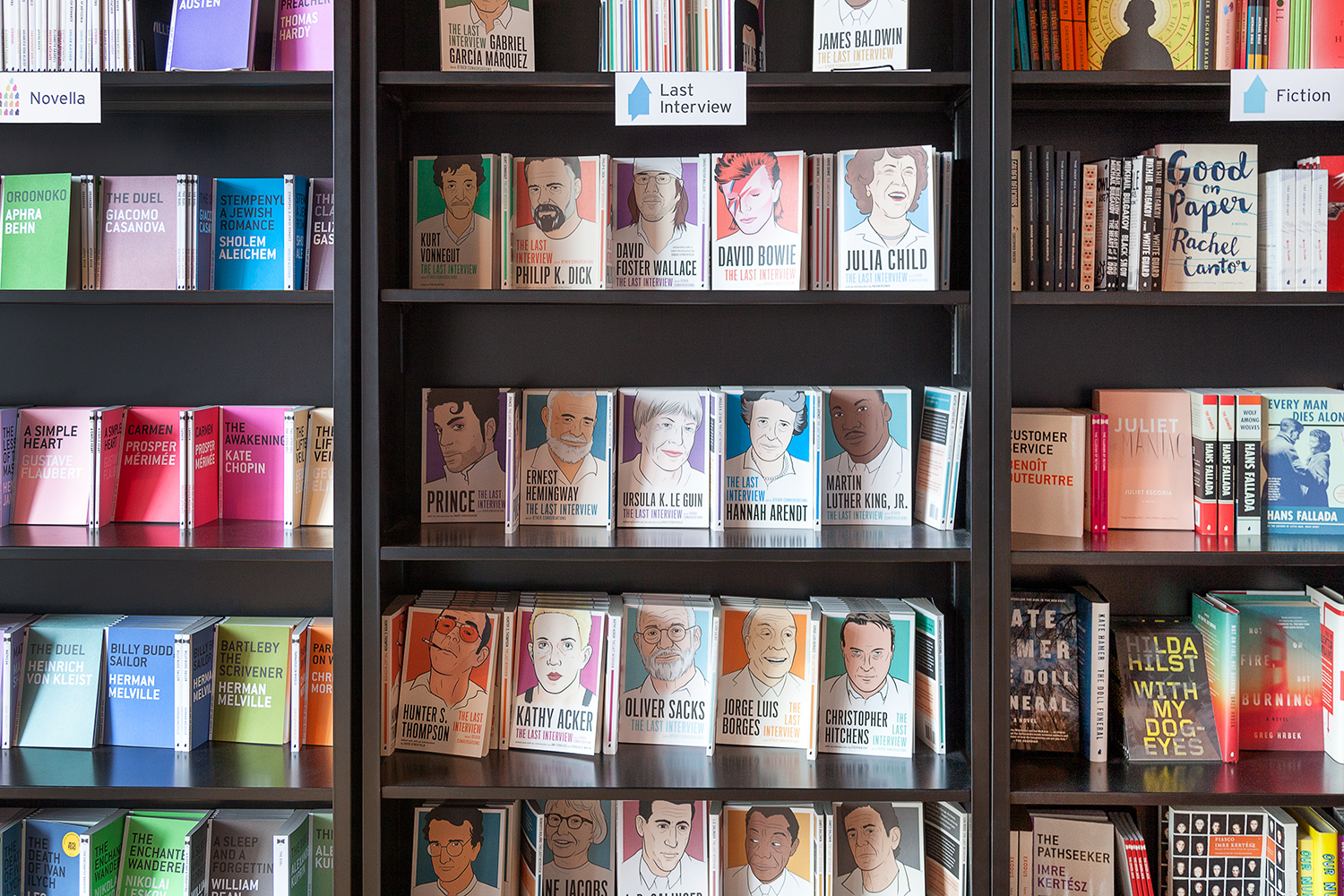
Melville House Publishing and Bookstore in Brooklyn

The company was founded by husband-and-wife team of Dennis Johnson and Valerie Merians. Johnson wrote a blog called "MobyLives" and after the 9/11 attacks collected poetry related to the event and published it as a book to great success, which launched the company. They intended Melville to be a low volume boutique that specializes in poetry and "highly literary" novels issuing less than six a year. The company has a reputation as a "activist press" and became known for works of "political reportage with a leftist streak". Johnson once said they formed the company with the notion of "getting Bush out of office" in the immediate aftermath of 9/11.

In 2007, they were named by the Association of American Publishers as the winner of the 2007 Miriam Bass Award for Creativity in Independent Publishing. The Little Girl and The Cigarette published by Melville was part of the AIGA (American Institute of Graphic Arts) "50 books/50 Covers" cover design award for 2007.

In 2008 Melville House moved to Dumbo, Brooklyn, to a location that includes a bookstore with their offices. The opening was on January 19, 2008. In 2013, Melville House started a sister company in the United Kingdom, Melville House UK.

Melville House publishes books in several series. These include the Art of the Novella Series, which The Atlantic called an "ongoing celebration of the form", and which includes classics by Miguel de Cervantes, Anton Chekhov, Virginia Woolf. The Neversink Library, "a collection of lost, forgotten, and 'foolishly ignored' books from around the world". The Last Interview series, which collects interviews with prominent writers, including the last interviews given before their deaths, has included Ernest Hemingway, Philip K. Dick and Nora Ephron.

In 2014, it published the Senate Intelligence Committee report on CIA torture in just 19 days; and later that year, an edition of the Pope Francis' Laudato si', an encyclical on climate change, soon after the Pope released it. The speed of publications has been called "extraordinary" for the industry. In 2016, Melville House published The Making of Donald Trump by David Cay Johnston. Melville used a process they call "crashing the book" to work around the clock and bring the book out in 27 days.

Stop Smiling was an arts and culture magazine founded by J. C. Gabel in the Chicago suburb of Darien, Illinois. He started the magazine at age 19 in 1995. The company ended the magazine in 2009 and became an independently owned imprint of Melville House Publishing.
