= William H. Janeway =

American economist

William Hall (Bill) Janeway
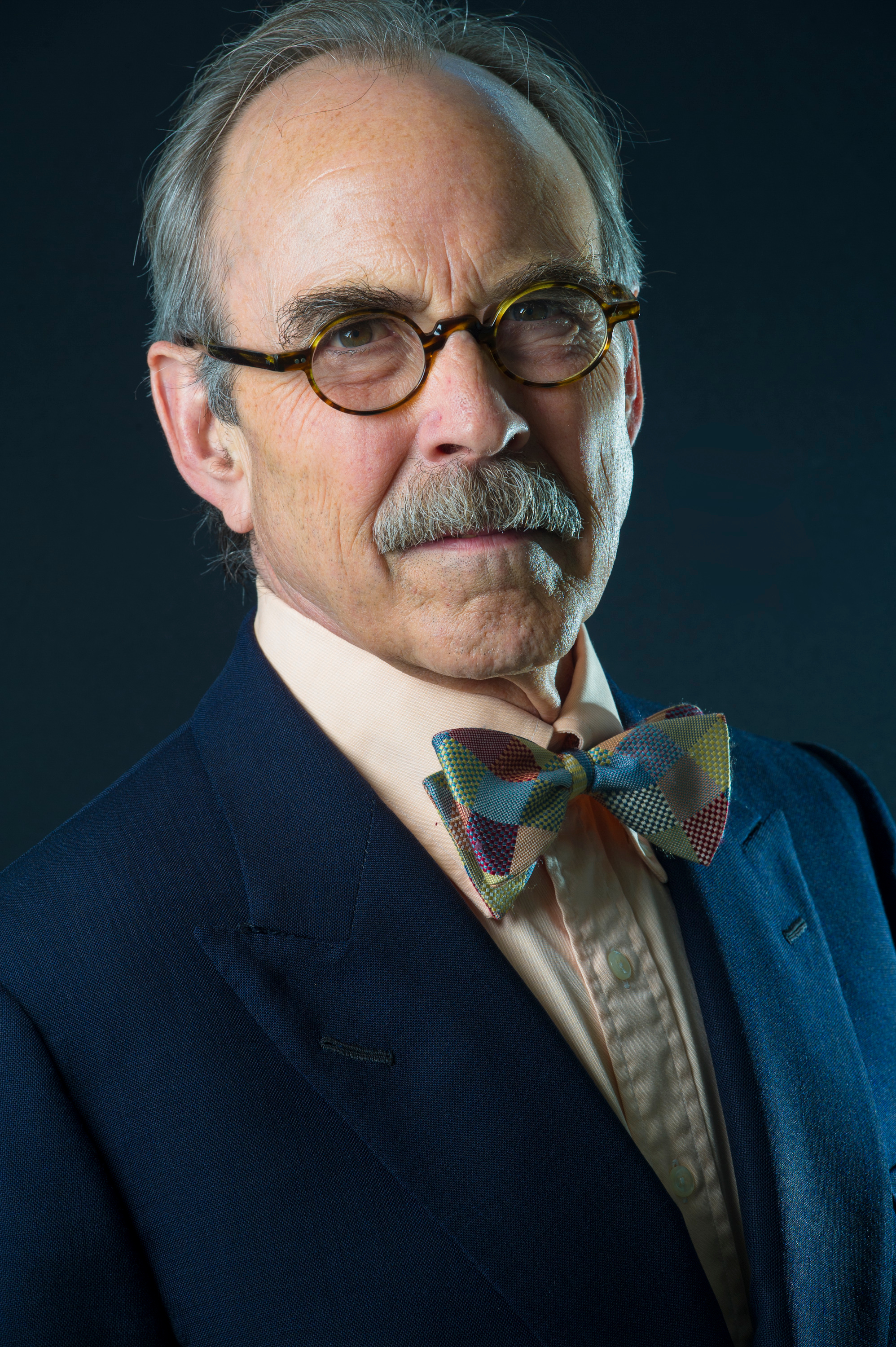
- Born: May 3, 1943 (age 83); New York City, United States
- Education: Princeton University; Pembroke College, Cambridge
- Occupations: Venture capitalist Economist
- Spouse: Weslie Janeway
- Parent(s): Elizabeth Hall Janeway; Eliot Janeway
- Family: Michael C. Janeway (brother)

William Hall "Bill" Janeway (born May 3, 1943) is an American venture capitalist and economist. His work on the innovation economy emphasizes the strategic role played by the state and by financial speculators.

== Early life and education ==
Bill Janeway was born on May 3, 1943, in Manhattan, the second son of Elizabeth Janeway, author and critic, and Eliot Janeway, political economy columnist. He attended Trinity School in New York, from which he graduated as valedictorian of the class of 1961, and Princeton University, from which he graduated as valedictorian of the class of 1965. He received a Marshall Scholarship to the University of Cambridge, where he matriculated at Pembroke College and received a Ph.D. in economics in 1971. His doctoral thesis, titled "The Economic Policies of the Labour Government of 1929-1931" was supervised by Professor Lord Kahn.

== Investment career ==
=== Investment banking ===
In 1970, Janeway joined F. Eberstadt & Co. and in 1979 was promoted to director of corporate finance. In 1985, F. Eberstadt was acquired by Robert Fleming & Co., the London merchant bank and investment management firm. Janeway served as director of corporate finance of the resulting American subsidiary, Eberstadt Fleming & Co., Inc., until 1988.

=== Venture capital ===
Janeway joined Warburg Pincus, the private equity firm, in 1988 as head of its high technology investment team. The firm's high-tech investments through the 1990s centered on information and communications technology, and, after 1991, increasingly focused on enterprise software.

In 1992, the firm funded the launch of OpenVision Technologies, which subsequently merged with VERITAS Software in 1996. In 1999, Warburg Pincus also was the founder and sole investor in BEA Systems. Warburg Pincus eventually distributed its positions in both companies to its limited partners, realizing total returns of $750 million in VERITAS shares and $6.5 billion in BEA shares on investments in each of approximately $50 million.

In 2006, Janeway retired as Vice Chairman of Warburg Pincus. He remains a special limited partner.

== Research ==
In collaboration with Michael McKenzie of the University of Sydney, Janeway conducted research on venture capital returns. He served as a teaching visitor at Princeton University’s economics department in 2012.

=== Work on innovation ===
Janeway re-engaged with academic economics through his friendship with Hyman Minsky that began in the mid-1980s. Janeway’s article, "Doing Capitalism: Notes on the Practice of Venture Capitalism," presented at the annual meeting of the Association for Evolutionary Economics in December 1985, was written at Minsky's behest.

== Current positions ==
Janeway is a special limited partner of Warburg Pincus. Janeway is a director of Magnet Systems and O'Reilly Media. He is a distinguished affiliated professor of the faculty of economics at Cambridge University.

Janeway is a co-founder and member of the board of governors of the Institute for New Economic Thinking. He is a member of the board of directors of the Social Science Research Council and of the advisory board of the Princeton Bendheim Center for Finance. He is a member of the management committee of the Cambridge-INET Institute, University of Cambridge and a member of the board of managers of the Cambridge Endowment for Research in Finance (CERF). He is a member of the board of directors of the Fields Institute for Research in the Mathematical Sciences. He is the author of Doing Capitalism in the Innovation Economy: Reconfiguring the Three-Player Game between Markets, Speculators, and the State, published by Cambridge University Press in 2012.

== Philanthropic work ==
Janeway and his wife, Weslie Janeway, established the Cambridge Endowment for Research in Finance in 2001 and funded the annual Princeton-Cambridge Finance Seminars in 2004.

== Personal life ==
In 1985, Janeway married Weslie Resnick, a vice president of F. Eberstadt & Company, in a non-denominational ceremony in New York City. It was his second marriage.

== Honors ==
In September 2012, Janeway was awarded an honorary Commander of the Order of the British Empire (CBE) "for services to education in support of Cambridge University and to UK/US relations". He is the recipient of the 2017 Marshall Medall of the Marshall Aid Commemoration Commission.

Janeway's book Doing Capitalism was included in Foreign Affairs' 2012 list of "Best Books on Economic, Social, and Environmental Subjects", as well as the Financial Times' "Best books of 2012".

== Publications ==
- W. H. Janeway, Doing Capitalism in the Innovation Economy: Markets, Speculation and the State (Cambridge University Press, 2012; fully revised and updated version, Cambridge University Press, 2018)
- M. D. McKenzie, and Janeway, W. H., "Venture Capital Funds as an Alternative Class of Investment" in Asset Management: Tools and Strategies, June, (London: Bloomsbury Publishing Company, 2011)
- W. H. Janeway, "Doing Capitalism, revised and extended" in W. Drechsler, Kattel, R. and Reinert. E.S. (eds.), Techno-Economic Paradigms: Essays in Honour of Carlota Perez, (London: Anthem Press, 2009)
- W. H. Janeway, Introduction, in N. R. Lamoreaux and Sokoloff, K. L. (eds), Financing Innovation in the United States, 1870 to the present. (Cambridge MA: MIT Press, 2007)
- W. H. Janeway, "Technology and Value", Social Research. 64 (3) 1327-1331 (1997)
- W. H. Janeway, "The 1931 sterling crisis and the independence of the Bank of England", Journal of Post-Keynesian Economics. 18 (2) 251-268 (Winter 1995–1996)
