= Daisy Kenyon =

1947 film by Otto Preminger

- 1947 US Theatrical Poster
- Directed by: Otto Preminger
- Screenplay by: David Hertz
- Based on: Daisy Kenyon; 1945 novel by Elizabeth Janeway
- Produced by: Otto Preminger
- Starring: Joan Crawford; Dana Andrews; Henry Fonda; Ruth Warrick; Martha Stewart; Peggy Ann Garner; Connie Marshall; Nicholas Joy; Art Baker
- Cinematography: Leon Shamroy
- Edited by: Louis R. Loeffler
- Music by: David Raksin
- Production company: 20th Century Fox
- Distributed by: 20th Century Fox
- Release date: December 25, 1947 (U.S.)
- Running time: 99 minutes
- Country: United States
- Language: English
- Budget: $1.852 million
- Box office: $1,750,000 (US rentals)

Daisy Kenyon is a 1947 American romantic-drama film by 20th Century Fox starring Joan Crawford, Henry Fonda, and Dana Andrews in a story about a post-World War II romantic triangle. The screenplay by David Hertz was based upon a 1945 novel of the same name by Elizabeth Janeway. The film was directed and produced by Otto Preminger. Having opened to restrained reception, Daisy Kenyon has seen reappraisal, and now enjoys a minor cult following for its realistic treatment of a typically melodramatic plot.

== Plot ==
Daisy Kenyon is a Manhattan commercial artist having an affair with an arrogant, overbearing and successful lawyer named Dan O'Mara, who is married and has two children. He breaks a date with Daisy one night, and she goes out with a widowed war veteran named Peter Lapham.

O'Mara and his wife Lucille fight constantly about his job, the upbringing of their two daughters, and his cheating. That same night, Dan takes his wife and 13-year-old daughter to New York's Stork Club, where Daisy and Peter are waiting to be seated. Daisy and Peter leave immediately. At the end of the date, Peter announces that he loves Daisy and leaves. Peter stands her up for their next date, but he comes by later unannounced and proposes.

Daisy realizes Peter is still in love with his late wife. Although she still loves Dan, Daisy marries Peter after a brief and hesitant courtship. She supports Peter's postwar career. He is moody, sometimes quiet, sometimes wildly exuberant; he knows Dan used to be in Daisy's life. Eventually, Daisy feels she has gotten over Dan.

Finally fed up with her spouse's cheating, Lucille wants a divorce and uses full custody of their daughters as leverage to hurt Dan. Dan asks Peter and Daisy to allow him to reveal the full details of his former relationship with Daisy during the divorce proceedings. Peter says he will not stand in Daisy's way - when they first met, he needed her, but he no longer does; he leaves. The trial begins, but Dan can see how much it is hurting Daisy, so he stops the proceedings and asks Peter to sign divorce papers, though Daisy did not request them.

Daisy goes to her house on Cape Cod to work. Dan calls from the train station to say he is bringing Peter to settle things. Panicking, Daisy flees. Her car skids on the icy road and rolls over. She walks two miles through the snow to the cottage, where Dan and Peter are playing cards. She wants both of them to leave. After a few words, Peter goes out to the waiting cab.

Daisy is appalled to learn that Dan gave up custody of his children to obtain his divorce, and admits she stopped loving him a long time ago. Dan goes out to the cab. Peter steps out, saying he is going home to his wife, and returns to the house where he and Daisy toast their future and embrace.

== Cast ==
- Joan Crawford as Daisy Kenyon
- Dana Andrews as Dan O'Mara
- Henry Fonda as Peter Lapham
- Ruth Warrick as Lucille O'Mara
- Martha Stewart as Mary Angelus
- Peggy Ann Garner as Rosamund O'Mara
- Connie Marshall as Marie O'Mara
- Nicholas Joy as Coverly
- Art Baker as Lucille O'Mara's attorney

Newspaper reporters Walter Winchell, Leonard Lyons, and Damon Runyon, along with actor John Garfield, make cameos in the film.

== Production ==
The rights to Elizabeth Janeway's novel were purchased by 20th Century Fox for $100,000 in 1945. Joan Crawford had intended to buy the rights for herself, but failed to bid before Fox. An unfinished first draft of the screenplay was written in August by Margaret Buell Wilder and Ted Sills before Hertz was brought in to write a second draft. Ring Lardner Jr., who had written the script for Laura, was hired to revise Hertz's draft in 1947. The Motion Picture Production Code administrators, with whom Preminger often sparred, took issue with the screenplay's "lack of regard for the sanctity of marriage." The studio was advised to avoid referencing explicit sexual intercourse, and to emphasize the moral wrongness of the relationship between the characters of Daisy and Dan. Preminger was also forced to work around the PCA's concerns over alcohol - characters pour alcoholic drinks in several scenes, but never drink them. The code administrators also suggested that the divorcing characters Dan and Lucille reunite at the end of the film.

Gene Tierney, who had starred in Preminger's 1944 film Laura, and Jennifer Jones, who had been considered for Tierney's role in that film, were both considered for the part of Daisy Kenyon in 1945 and 1946, respectively, before Crawford was allowed to be "borrowed" from her contract with Warner Bros. The casting of Crawford was somewhat problematic, as she was 42, while the character of Daisy as depicted in the novel is 32. A make-up artist and shadowy cinematography were employed to disguise Crawford's age. Andrews and Fonda were not fond of the script, but completed the film to fulfill their contracts.

Production of the film was completed without setback, two days ahead of schedule and only $100 over the set budget. Ruth Warrick stated that Preminger "carried himself like an army officer, and behaved like a general moving the troops." Warrick also commented on the amicable relationship of the director and his lead star, saying "With Otto and Joan, we had two tyrants on the set, and that may have kept both of them in line." The only apparent problem on set was the maintenance of a temperature of 50 °F to ease Crawford's hot flashes. Warrick said "she was always in tennis shorts and a thin blouse because she was so hot, while I had to wear a fur coat to keep warm. Otto said not one word about the temperature." Crawford presented Andrews and Fonda with long underwear as appeasement.

== Reception ==
Reviews at its release were generally positive, if dismissive. Otto Preminger himself stated that he forgot he had made the film. Variety's review stated that the central "triangle, in which Dana Andrews and Henry Fonda fight it out for the love of Joan Crawford, is basically a shallow lending-library affair, but it's made to seem important by the magnetic trio's slick-smart backgrounds - plus, of course, excellent direction, sophisticated dialog, solid supporting cast, and other flashy production values." T.M.P. in The New York Times wrote "Miss Crawford is, of course, an old hand at being an emotionally confused and frustrated woman, and she plays the role with easy competence." Otis L. Guernsey, Jr. in the New York Herald Tribune wrote "Preminger accomplishes no mean feat in guiding these people in and out among the interweavings of their own complexes, and he does wonders in varying the action of similar scenes."

Initial dismissal of Daisy Kenyon has given way to some critical reappraisal in recent years; it has earned a cult following, with some calling it a misunderstood masterpiece and one of Preminger's better films. Mike D'Angelo, giving the film a grade of 99 out of a possible 100 points, hailed Kenyon as "the most bluntly realistic romantic melodrama I've ever seen." Dan Callahan of Slant, awarding Daisy Kenyon three and a half stars out of four, called the film a "troubling and ambiguous portrayal of three real, unknowable characters (and actors) in constant flux", writing that the film "distilled [soap opera] to its real life essence, until what's left is nothing more than the ultimate mystery of art." Fernando Croce, giving the film four and a half stars out of five, called the film "a scrupulously cooled romance and a portrait of a postwar nation, but first and foremost...a fluid chart of thorny personal spaces brushing against each other."

Chris Fujiwara, in a 2015 study of Preminger's films, draws attention to the fact that Daisy Kenyon is "possibly the first Hollywood film to allude to the internment of Japanese Americans during World War II." Dan, partly in an attempt to impress Daisy, takes a pro-bono case for a Japanese American war veteran whose land was confiscated while he was away fighting. Dan is physically attacked in the course of the case and ultimately loses it. The original screenplay had a scene depicting a racist judge, but the film censor Joseph Breen did not allow it.

Arnaud Dephalese, in a 2026 study about PTSD in American cinema, considers the film exemplifies the moral critique introduced by Peter (Henry Fonda), one of Daisy Kenyon’s suitors and a traumatized soldier. Here, psychic trauma serves to reveal what lies beneath the surface: the apparent instability of the gentle Peter actually conceals strength and serenity. In contrast, the false confidence of the rich lawyer Dan (Dana Andrews) makes him unstable and indecisive.

Daisy Kenyon holds an 86% rating on review aggregation website Rotten Tomatoes, based on seven reviews. Critics Roundup, a website that described itself as "the first movie review aggregator to select reviews based on writing quality instead of popularity", reported that 100% of 12 critics reviewed the film positively. The assessment is available through the Wayback machine. The website ceased to exist several years ago.
