= Marcus Brauchli =

American journalist (born 1971)

Marcus W. Brauchli
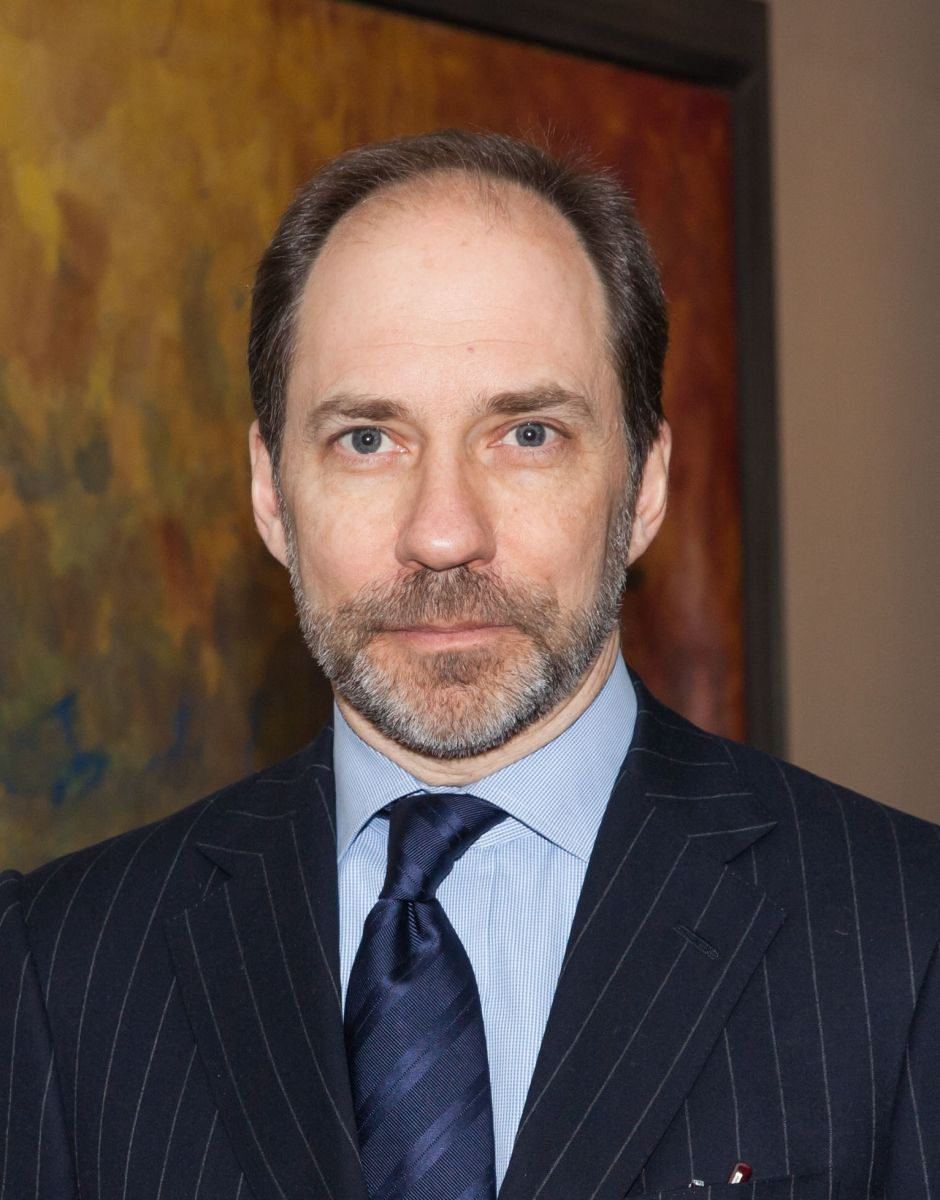
- Brauchli in 2012
- Born: June 19, 1961 (age 64); Boulder, Colorado, U.S.
- Education: Columbia University (BA)
- Occupations: former Executive editor, The Washington Post
- Spouse: Maggie Farley

Marcus W. Brauchli (born June 19, 1961) is a journalist, media investor and advisor. He was executive editor of The Washington Post from 2008 to 2012, overseeing the Post's print and digital news operations. He succeeded Leonard Downie, Jr. and preceded Martin Baron. He previously served as the managing editor of The Wall Street Journal before Rupert Murdoch's News Corp. acquired the Journal's parent company, Dow Jones & Co.

== Early life and education ==
A native of Boulder, Colorado, Brauchli graduated from Columbia College of Columbia University in 1983. Brauchli was a Nieman fellow at Harvard University from 1991 to 1992.

== Journalism career ==
Before joining the Post, Brauchli was managing editor of The Wall Street Journal. Brauchli had served 15 years as a foreign correspondent, mainly in Asia, and eight years as a senior editor in New York. He was the paper's National Editor on Sept. 11, 2001, and played a key role in its coverage that day, for which it won a Pulitzer Prize. Shortly after Brauchli's appointment as managing editor was announced, Rupert Murdoch's News Corp. disclosed a takeover offer for Dow Jones & Co., the Journal's parent. Brauchli remained as editor through the acquisition but four months afterwards, on April 22, 2008, he announced his resignation. The Post, under new publisher Katharine Weymouth, announced on July 8 that it had hired him.

During his tenure, the Post won seven Pulitzer prizes, including five for the newsroom, and many other journalism awards. A 2012 account in The New York Times outlined signs and reports that Brauchli's "relationship with the publisher has cooled". It also noted that Raju Narisetti, whom Brauchli had brought with him from the Journal as a "close partner...in the digital reinvention of the newsroom", had left the Post in January. The Times also said that "[b]y one important measure, The Post’s efforts are paying off. Recently, it has averaged 19.6 million unique visitors a month, according to comScore, making it the second-most-visited American newspaper Web site, behind that of The New York Times".

According to that same article about The Washington Post in The New York Times, "Mr. Brauchli has reacted to the upheaval by overseeing one of the most sweeping and closely watched reorientations of any newsroom in the country. The editors now stress online metrics and freely borrow from the playbooks of more nimble online competitors like Politico and The Huffington Post. The outcome of their efforts could offer a high-profile case study on how a company can foster an entrepreneurial, digital culture while remaining true to its heritage."

Brauchli stepped down as editor at the end of 2012 and took on a new role working for the Post's parent company, before the Post was sold to Jeff Bezos, the founder of Amazon.com. He remained a consultant to the parent company, Graham Holdings Co., for two years.

== Venture capital role ==
In 2014, Brauchli co-founded a new investment firm, North Base Media. North Base Media is focused on digital-media opportunities in emerging markets and technologies enabling media companies to engage audiences better. It has raised several funds and counts a number of media companies among its investors.

One of NBM's first investments was media company Rappler in the Philippines, which was founded by Maria Ressa, who came under political pressure for her commitment to free press and against the dangers of social-media companies, including Facebook. She was a 2021 Nobel Peace Prize laureate for her work. NBM also backs IDN Media in Indonesia; PocketAces and Loco in India; Minute Media in the U.K.; Capital Digital in Mexico; and technology companies such as OpenSlate in New York, Syte.io of Israel, NewsBytes in India and Zaiko in Japan.

== Personal life ==
Brauchli has been based overseas in Hong Kong, Stockholm, Tokyo and Shanghai and has covered at least 20 countries. He is married to Maggie Farley, a former Los Angeles Times correspondent..

Preceded by Leonard Downie Jr.	Executive Editor of The Washington Post; 2008-2012	Succeeded by Martin Baron
