= David Weigel =

American journalist and blogger (born 1981)

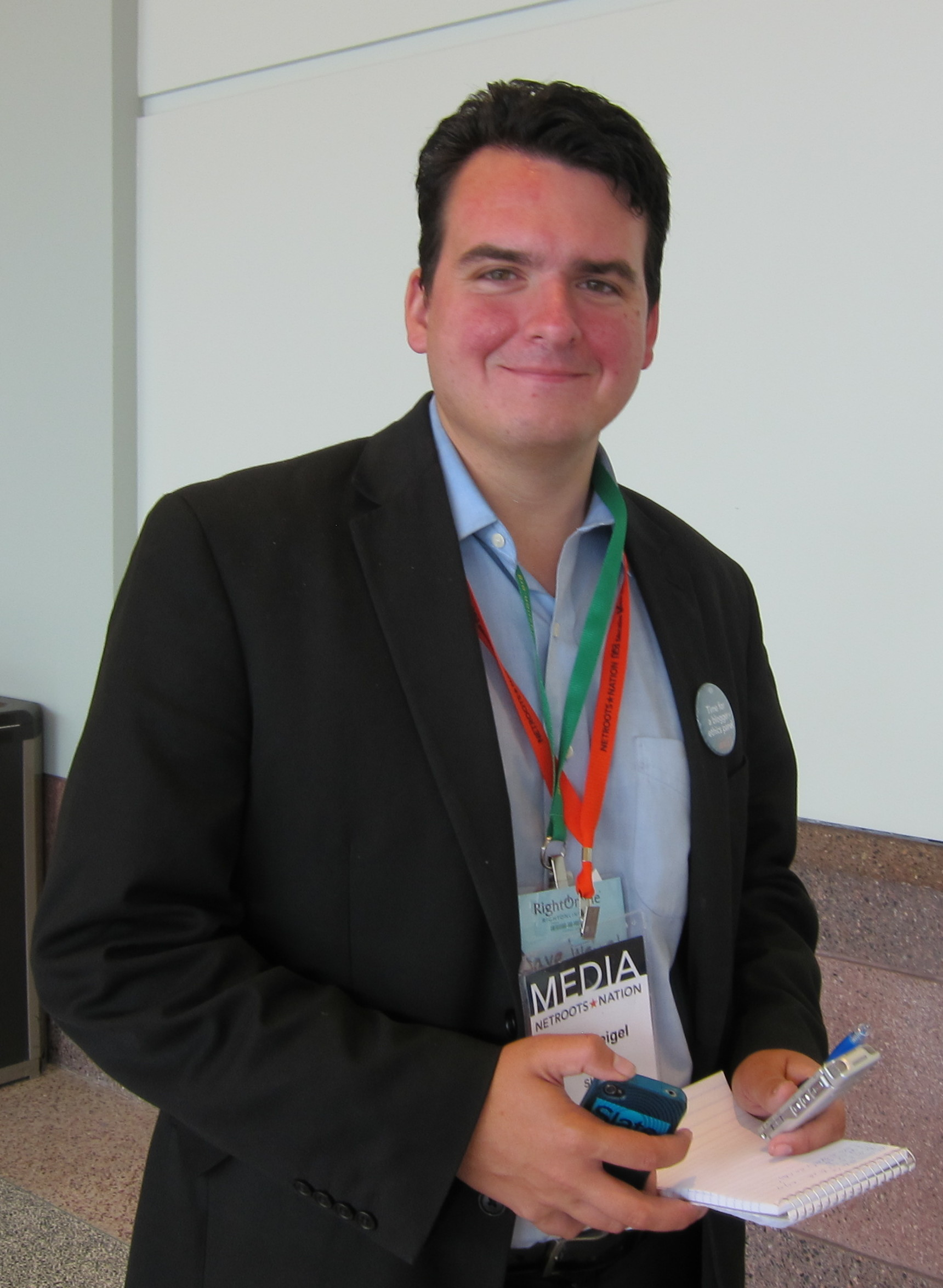
- Weigel in 2011
- Born: September 26, 1981 (age 45); Wilmington, Delaware, U.S.
- Education: Northwestern University (BS)
- Occupations: Journalist, blogger
- Employer: Semafor

David Weigel (born September 26, 1981) is an American journalist and columnist at the news website Semafor. Weigel previously covered politics for The Washington Post, Slate, and Bloomberg Politics and is a contributing editor for Reason magazine.

== Early years and background ==
Weigel was born and raised in Wilmington, Delaware. After moving to England in 1998, he graduated from the American Community School in Cobham, Surrey, in "the high Tory London suburbs" of the London commuter belt, in 2000.

He moved to Evanston, Illinois in 2000 and received a Bachelor of Science degree in 2004 from the Medill School of Journalism at Northwestern University, with a double-major in journalism and political science and a minor in history. While at college, Weigel wrote for The Daily Northwestern and was editor-in-chief of the campus's conservative newspaper Northwestern Chronicle. In the summer of 2001, he also had a "fun" internship at the libertarian Center for Individual Rights.

=== Political affiliations ===
In the 2000 U.S. presidential election, Weigel voted for Ralph Nader, and served as a Delaware college elector for Nader. In May 2002, then-The Daily Northwestern writer and current Bloomberg News reporter Dan Murtaugh noted how "in two years Dave Weigel has gone from being a Ralph Nader-voting uber-liberal to the scorn of the leftist movement at Northwestern" and how Weigel underwent a "180-degree political turn" "after he was turned away from The Daily" and started working for The Chronicle. In February 2003, while enrolled as a junior and working as editor-in-chief of Northwestern Chronicle, Weigel supported the Iraq War and crashed an anti-war protest at Northwestern University.

In the 2004 election, Weigel voted for John Kerry. Weigel later wrote that "[he regrets] the Nader vote, but not the Kerry vote, as a weak Democratic president with a conservative Congress would have been pretty tolerable in retrospect". He voted for Jack Ryan in the 2004 Republican U.S. Senate primary in Illinois.

In early 2007, Weigel became a registered Republican in the District of Columbia in order to vote for Ron Paul at the Republican primary stage of the 2008 presidential election. In November 2008, Weigel voted for Barack Obama, explaining "I really don't think McCain has the temperament to be President or the interest in standing up to a Democratic Congress....I've got the luxury of a guilt-free, zero-impact vote in the District of Columbia, which I would cast for Bob Barr if he was on the ballot".

In January 2011, Weigel stated that he had voted for Republican Patrick Mara in elections to the Council of the District of Columbia, and that he had voted for Mara "every time he's been on the ballot".

In the Republican Party presidential primaries 2012, Weigel voted for Jon Huntsman, despite his having withdrawn from the race, because "If you looked past his whiff of a tax plan (Huntsman recommended using the flat rates that Simpson and Bowles recommended not using), the guy had a few good ideas." In the 2012 general election, Weigel voted for Gary Johnson.

== Career ==
Weigel began his professional career as an editorial assistant and researcher for the USA Today editorial page and as a reporter for Campaigns & Elections. He has contributed articles to Slate, The Daily Beast, Time, The Guardian, The American Prospect, The American Spectator, The Washington Monthly, The American Conservative, Politico, and The Nation. He has appeared on NPR's Fresh Air and MSNBC's The Rachel Maddow Show. Weigel has also blogged for The Economist's "Democracy in America" blog, and guest-blogged for Andrew Sullivan's "Daily Dish" blog at The Atlantic. His book The Show That Never Ends: The Rise and Fall of Prog Rock was published in June 2017.

Weigel is a contributing editor of the libertarian Reason magazine and was one of its staff political writers from 2006 to 2008. He wrote for the liberal Washington Independent from November 2008 until early 2010 and was one of the "best sourced" reporters there, according to Michael Calderone of Politico.

=== The Washington Post ===
After working for the Washington Independent, Weigel took a job writing the "Right Now" column on the Washington Post website, focusing on the conservative movement. Weigel told Politico that "If readers get a deeper understanding of these people, their strategy, and their ideas, then I'm doing my job." The national editor of The Washington Post said Weigel was hired to add a voice to the paper's online politics coverage. Howard Kurtz of The Washington Post said the online columns were supposed to contain a mixture of reporting and opinion.

Weigel was criticized by conservatives for tweets that he made on May 2, 2010, that disparaged news editor Matt Drudge, and that called opponents of same-sex marriage "bigots". Penny Nance of conservative group Concerned Women for America responded that Weigel's "arrogance disqualifies him as a serious journalist assigned to covering conservatives." Politics Daily noted that The Washington Post's guidelines require Post journalists to "refrain from writing, tweeting or posting anything ... that could be perceived as reflecting political, racial, sexist, religious or other bias or favoritism that could be used to tarnish our journalistic credibility." Weigel apologized on May 3.

==== Leaked e-mails ====
In late June 2010, excerpts of several of Weigel's private emails from JournoList were posted online by the website Fishbowl DC and later by Tucker Carlson's conservative news site, The Daily Caller. JournoList had been started in 2007 by Ezra Klein as an invitation-only discussion and debate forum for left-of-center bloggers and reporters. The excerpts of Weigel's archived emails contained negative remarks about various public figures associated with American conservatism such as Pat Buchanan, Matt Drudge, Newt Gingrich, and Rush Limbaugh.

Weigel said all of the emails were sent before he joined The Washington Post. He apologized online before the second round of email excerpts was published on the Tucker Carlson site, explaining that he had thought the off-the-record listserv environment was a place where he could "talk bluntly to friends". However, The Washington Post responded that the apology could not save his job because "the damage was too severe." Jim Geraghty of the National Review Online wrote that "there was definitely a perception that his blog was designed to make conservatives look bad."

Weigel on media tempest

"I used to make fun of these people[...]when they tried to explain their downfall, or when they tried to express contrition. And suddenly I was one of them". "I can't imagine ever again writing about someone without manning up to get him or her to comment, or provide more context. I realized that no one could take the same scrutiny and walk away looking saintly".

As a result of the leaked emails, Weigel resigned from The Washington Post and Ezra Klein shut down JournoList. The executive editor of The Washington Post said the paper "can't have any tolerance for the perception that people are conflicted or bring a bias to their work.” Journalist Marc Ambinder of the Atlantic said Weigel was forced to resign under an "old media", "non-ideological standard that just doesn't exist". In closing down JournoList, Klein said it had "become a weapon, and insofar as people's careers are now at stake, it has to die". Describing Weigel as "an idiosyncratic libertarian who likes some politicians and media figures, and not others", Klein said that Weigel's "likes and dislikes do not fall neatly across party lines". Remarking that leaked information can show only a partial, cherry picked truth, and that it can be just plain wrong, Klein said that if other emails had been chosen, Weigel could have been made to look like a conservative extremist.

=== After the Post ===
Weigel began appearing on MSNBC in 2009. On June 28, 2010, Keith Olbermann announced that Weigel was joining MSNBC as a news contributor.

Politico, listing Weigel as one of the "50 politicos to watch", commented that "Weigel may have lost a blogging job with The Washington Post over his leaked e-mails to an off-the-record liberal e-mail list, but he didn't exactly damage his career. If anything, the enthusiastic endorsements of his reporting skills after he left the Post last month brought Weigel to the attention of a wider audience than the relatively small group of conservative activists and the reporters who write about them for whom Weigel has long been a must-read" and that he expected to sign on to "some outlet that has a big online presence" by the end of July.

In August 2010, Weigel joined Slate magazine (then owned by The Washington Post) as a political reporter. Weigel said "This is the magazine that invented the sort of journalism I want to do", he continued, "And I'm very pleased that I'll get to continue working the beat I developed at the Post, the Independent, and Reason." Weigel ran a blog covering politics, focusing largely but not exclusively on the conservative movement, his area of expertise. He also wrote long-form pieces, including a multi-part series on progressive rock.

In September 2014, Weigel left Slate in preparation for a new job at Bloomberg Politics.

=== Return to the Post ===
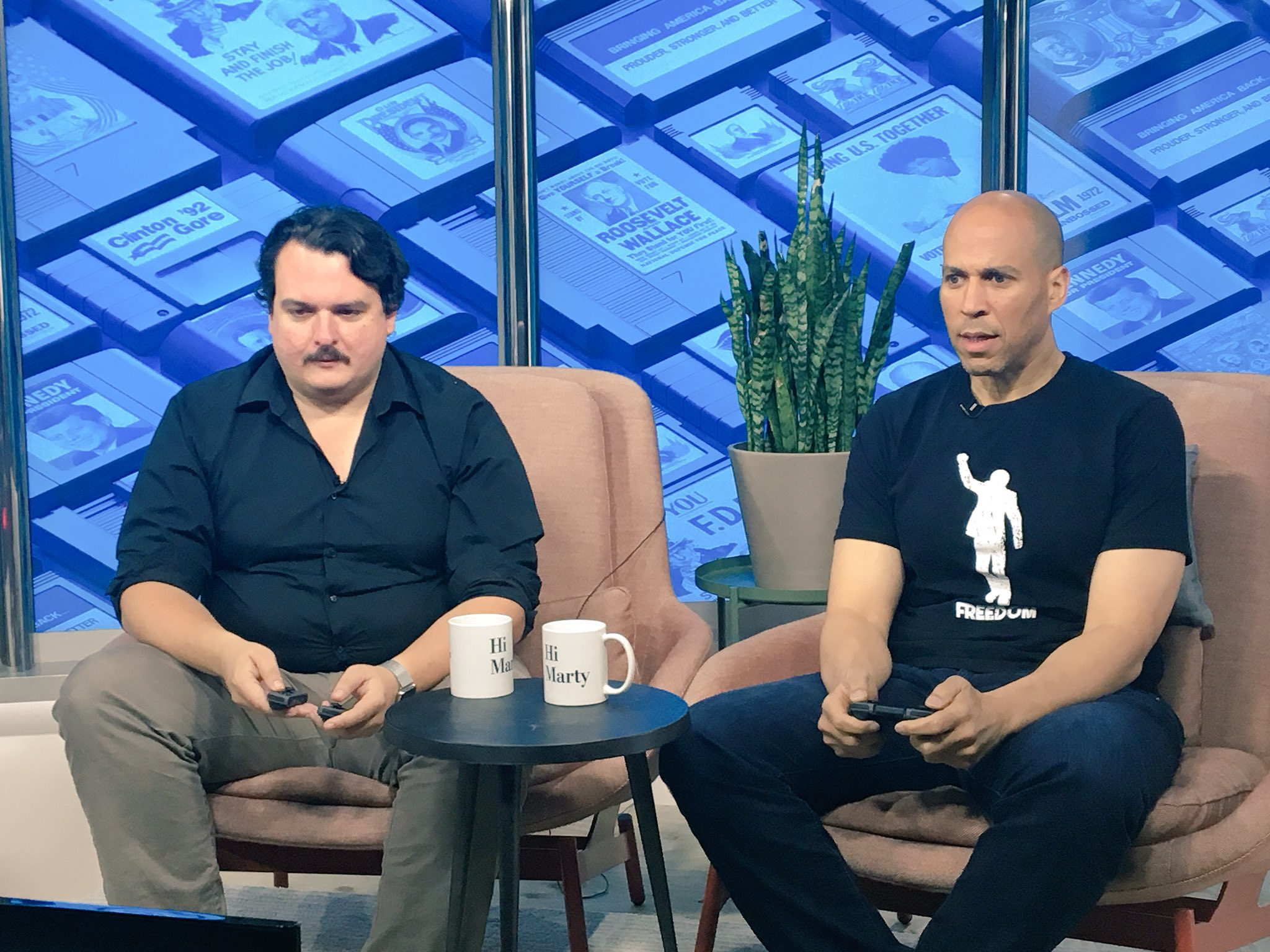
David Weigel playing video games with Senator Cory Booker as part of an interview at The Washington Post in 2018

After only nine months at Bloomberg Politics, Weigel returned to The Washington Post on July 20, 2015. His beat was to cover grassroots movements as part of the Post's presidential coverage. He began authoring the newsletter The Trailer in 2018, which focused on electoral campaigns.

On December 8, 2017, Weigel tweeted a photo of the crowd at President Donald Trump's rally at the Pensacola Bay Center in Florida that showed many empty seats. He quickly deleted the tweet after it was pointed out that the photo was taken before the venue filled up. Trump addressed the incident the next day on his Twitter account and demanded that Weigel be fired. Weigel replied and apologized, writing "Was confused by the image of you walking in the bottom right corner."

In June 2022, the Post suspended Weigel without salary for a month after he retweeted an allegedly sexist joke which characterized all women as either bisexual or bipolar. Weigel, who later removed the retweet and apologized, was publicly criticized by colleague Felicia Sonmez.

=== Semafor ===
In September 2022, Weigel left the Washington Post and was hired by news startup Semafor, which launched the following month. He writes the Americana newsletter, which focuses on national politics.

== Personal life ==
Weigel was mentioned in a 2006 article in The New York Times about bloggers who roomed together. At that time, he shared a house with fellow Reason.com writer Julian Sanchez that they had dubbed "Casa de Libertarios".

He is married and lives in Los Angeles.
