= John S. Driscoll =

American journalist (1934–2019)

- Born: August 31, 1934; Melrose, Massachusetts
- Died: February 5, 2019 (aged 84); Boston, Massachusetts
- Education: Northeastern University
- Occupations: Journalist, editor
- Employer: The Boston Globe
- Spouse: Dolores A. LeSaffre
- Children: 4

John S. Driscoll (August 31, 1934 – February 5, 2019) was an American journalist who served as editor of The Boston Globe from 1986 to 1993.

== Biography ==
Driscoll was born in Melrose, Massachusetts, and first worked for The Boston Globe as a high school correspondent. He earned a degree from Northeastern University in 1957 and worked for the Union Leader of Manchester, New Hampshire; the Haverhill Journal of Haverhill, Massachusetts; and United Press International. He re-joined the Globe in 1958.

Rising through the ranks of the Globe, Driscoll eventually succeeding Michael C. Janeway as editor in March 1986. He left the Globe in 1994, retiring to Rye, New Hampshire.

Driscoll and his wife, Dolores, had four daughters. He authored a memoir about his parents and siblings, Picnic for Twelve: A Memoir of the Driscoll Family. Driscoll died in Boston in February 2019.

Preceded by Michael C. Janeway	Editor of The Boston Globe; 1986–1993	Succeeded by Matthew V. Storin
