= Michael Kranish =

American journalist

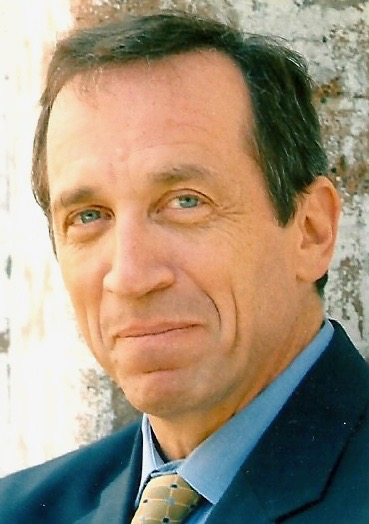
- Kranish
- Education: Syracuse University
- Occupation: Journalist
- Employer: The Washington Post
- Notable credit(s): Trump Revealed; The World's Fastest Man: The Extraordinary Life of Cyclist Major Taylor; Flight from Monticello:Thomas Jefferson at War
- Title: Political investigative Reporter
- Website: http://www.michaelkranish.com

Michael Kranish is an American author and former correspondent with The Boston Globe. He joined The Washington Post in 2016, where he is an investigative political reporter.

== Biography ==
A graduate of the Maxwell School of Citizenship and Public Affairs at Syracuse University, Michael Kranish joined the Boston Globe in 1984. He worked in the newspaper's Washington Bureau and was the White House reporter during the last two years of the presidency of George H. W. Bush and the first two years of Bill Clinton. He was the paper's national political reporter during the 1996 and 2000 campaigns. His other assignments with the Globe have included congressional reporter, New England reporter, and business writer. He previously worked for the Miami Herald and the Lakeland Ledger.

He is the co-author (with Brian C. Mooney, and Nina J. Easton) of a biography of Senator John Kerry, John F. Kerry: The Complete Biography by the Boston Globe Reporters Who Know Him Best, and the author of a history of Thomas Jefferson, Flight from Monticello: Thomas Jefferson at War. He is co-author with Globe writer Scott Helman of The Real Romney.

Kranish joined the Washington Post in January 2016. With co-author Marc Fisher and supervised by The Washington Post editor Marty Baron, Kranish authored the biography, Trump Revealed: An American Journey of Ambition, Ego, Money, and Power.

Kranish authored a book about the African-American cyclist Major Taylor in 2019, titled The World's Fastest Man: The Extraordinary Life of Cyclist Major Taylor, America's First Black Sports Hero. Taylor won the world championship in 1899, and raced across the United States, Europe and Australia, overcoming racist efforts to ban him at the height of the Jim Crow era.

Kranish is the 2016 winner of the Society of Professional Journalists award for Washington Correspondence. He was part of a Washington Post team that won the 2025 Pulitzer Prize for Breaking News Coverage. He authored a seven-part, 48-page section of series called "Revolutionary Revelations: Jefferson, the Declaration, and an American Paradox".
