= Eliot Janeway =

American journalist

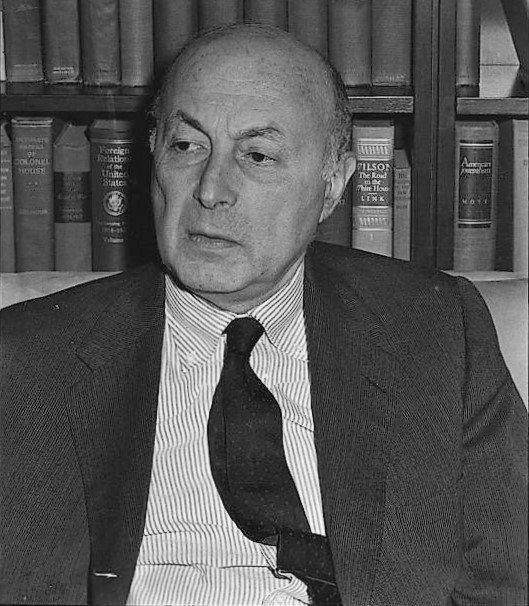
- Janeway in 1969
- Born: Eliot Jacobstein; January 1, 1913; New York City, U.S.
- Died: February 8, 1993 (age 80)
- Education: B.A. Cornell University
- Occupations: Economist; Journalist; Author
- Spouse(s): Carol Janeway; Elizabeth Janeway
- Children: Michael C. Janeway; William H. Janeway
- Parent(s): Meyer Joseph Jacobstein; Fanny Siff Jacobstein

Eliot Janeway (January 1, 1913 – February 8, 1993), born Eliot Jacobstein, was an American economist, journalist and author, widely quoted during his lifetime, whose career spanned seven decades. For a time his ideas gained some influence within the administration of President Franklin D. Roosevelt, and he was an informal economic advisor to Lyndon B. Johnson, especially during Johnson's years in Congress, though he broke with Johnson over the economics of the Vietnam War. His eclectic approach focused on the interaction between political pressures, economic policy and market trends. He was at times a vigorous critic of the economic policies of presidents from Franklin D. Roosevelt to Ronald Reagan. His enduring pessimism about U.S. economic prospects earned him the nickname "Calamity Janeway".

== Early life, education, and marriages ==
Born Eliot Jacobstein in New York City on January 1, 1913, Janeway was the son of Jewish parents, Meyer Joseph Jacobstein and Fanny Siff. Janeway's family kept their religion secret, and his mother kept two nameplates for the buzzer panel in the lobby of her apartment house, Jacobstein and Janeway. She changed them, depending on whom she expected. Eliot used the name Janeway, and did not acknowledge his religion or heritage to others.

Janeway majored in economics at Cornell University, eloped with classmate Caroline Rindsfoos with whom he travelled in 1933 to London following his mentor British political scientist George Catlin, and enrolling at the London School of Economics. He briefly was a member of the British Communist Party. In 1934, they traveled to Moscow, both wrote briefly for The Moscow News, an English-language paper, which the strongly pro-Communist Anna Louise Strong had founded and then edited. The marriage quickly foundered, he returned to England, she stayed on and kept his name, Carol Janeway, becoming in the 1940s a well-known ceramist in New York.

While he did not consistently champion any particular branch of economic theory, his classic economic history and first book, Struggle for Survival, chronicled the World War II mobilization and the Keynesian fiscal policy of the Roosevelt administration.

In 1938, Janeway married Elizabeth Hall. Under the name Elizabeth Janeway, she became a noted novelist and essayist. They had two sons, Michael C. Janeway, a former editor of The Boston Globe and a dean of the Medill School of Journalism at the Northwestern University, and William H. Janeway, a vice-chairman until 2006 at Warburg Pincus, a private equity firm. Michael also served as a special assistant to U.S. Secretary of State Cyrus Vance and served as a professor at the Columbia University Graduate School of Journalism prior to his death in 2014.

== Early career ==
Janeway's writing career began at 24, when he wrote a series of articles for The Nation magazine predicting the 1937-38 recession and proposing a massive program of government investment in transportation and power equipment to cure it. Known as the Roosevelt Recession, with the exception of the Great Depression, it was perhaps the sharpest and deepest economic downturn of the century. The combination of higher reserve requirements imposed by the Federal Reserve Board on the nation's commercial banks and the introduction of the new Social Security tax on employees and employers contributed to the downturn.

Janeway's articles also warned against selling arms to Japan long before the attack on Pearl Harbor and noted that U.S. railroads needed renovation. His articles attracted interest in the Roosevelt administration and brought him some influence within its policy-making councils.

Another interested reader was Henry R. Luce, who hired Janeway to write part-time for Time and Fortune magazines. Janeway worked for the magazines until 1944. In 1940, William Saroyan lists him among "contributing editors" at Time in the play, Love's Old Sweet Song. Thereafter, for the next four years he worked directly for Luce, writing a private weekly economic and political advisory letter. In 1948, he quit to write his first book, Struggle for Survival, which was published in 1951.

According to Janeway, Roosevelt followed the war president path of Abraham Lincoln. Janeway believed that both were too practical to try to micro-manage a wartime mobilization, and that both realized that the mobilization could be confused at the top as long as it was overwhelming at the base. As Janeway said, "A victory small enough to be organized is too small to be decisive." Throughout the war, Roosevelt "looked to democracy and not to leaders, to democracy's reservoir of mass energy and faith and not to the custodians of specialized wisdom."

As Janeway would later say in a 1988 interview: "The Depression transformed economics from a subject of study into an obstacle to be overcome." His Struggle for Survival discussed how World War II and its full employment boom had transformed economics from a dismal science into the means for dynamic possibilities. "I'm the last person who could be accused of practicing economics in any sort of computerized vacuum," he once told an interviewer. "Political economy is not a science, it's a clinical art, like medicine."

In 1955 Janeway started two weekly economic advisory newsletters that formed the heart of the Janeway Publishing and Research Corporation, a business he operated out of his five-story town house on East 80th Street in New York City. In addition to his newsletters, in the 1960s and 1970s Janeway was a syndicated columnist for the Chicago Tribune-New York News syndicate. Janeway scored a number of forecasting firsts, among them higher interest rates that followed the escalation of the Vietnam War. He also became famous in the late 1960s for his dire forecasts of stock market trauma, which earned him the nickname "Calamity Janeway" on Wall Street.

Janeway was an informal adviser to Lyndon B. Johnson during Johnson's career in the United States House of Representatives and Senate. Janeway was among those who urged Johnson to run for the presidency in 1956 and was an active fundraiser for Johnson during the 1960 Democratic presidential primaries. After Johnson became president in November 1963, Janeway disagreed with him on many points of fiscal policy, and broke irrevocably with the president when Johnson escalated the war in Vietnam in 1965. Janeway's book, The Economics of Crisis, resulted from his break with Johnson.

Janeway's analysis and criticism of Johnson's handling of the Vietnam War was economic in nature and affected by Struggle for Survival, his early work on the history of the World War II mobilization. "I was not arguing against the war itself; that is not my field of expertise," he said in an interview. "I said that putting it on the back of the economy without raising taxes and instituting controls would bring on disaster."

=== Later career ===
In the mid-1970s, Janeway warned that a credit crunch in farming regions of the U.S. might lead to an agricultural depression. To some extent he anticipated the credit crunch of the mid-1980s, which resulted in the savings and loan industry's troubles throughout farm country. Janeway also anticipated the widespread advent of two-income families when, in 1976, he said that "single-paycheck families are doomed. They don't have a fighting chance. They're like a patient without an oxygen tent, an appendicitis victim without penicillin."

During the 1970s, in personal appearances and in his newspaper columns in more than a dozen newspapers, Janeway warned that "housing prices and interest rates will go through the roof" and that the stock market was heading for a collapse. In late 1974, the Dow Jones Industrial Average, which had peaked above 1,000 a year earlier, fell to 577. Janeway appeared on TV talk shows and on lecture tours, reportedly receiving as much as five thousand dollars a speech. He wrote eight books and articles for many publications that included Newsweek, Barron's, Commonweal and The New York Times.

In 1989, Janeway published his final book, The Economics of Chaos. This book once again reflected the influence of the 1940s mobilization model on Janeway's thinking, as he called for mobilizing the country's hidden assets. Janeway arrived at diverse reform strategies by a reconsideration of U.S. economic history from Alexander Hamilton to Ronald Reagan. He proposed swapping U.S. food exports for oil imports, and demanded somewhat protectionist "reciprocity" in trade, whereby importers who penetrated more than 25 percent of a U.S. domestic market would be required to invest in American assets or buy U.S. products.

In The Economics of Chaos Janeway urged the United States Treasury Department to invest Social Security and other government trust funds more aggressively to generate greater benefits. Such improved benefits, Janeway argued, would coax millions of workers in the underground economy to pay their taxes in order to receive the better returns of government-sponsored programs. Janeway's proposal to invest Social Security funds more aggressively anticipated subsequent calls to privatize Social Security trust funds and invest them more aggressively in the stock market.

Janeway had other maverick proposals to halt the flight of workers and cash into the vast underground economy, which he called a three-ring circus consisting of growing numbers of people working off the books, the bustling Eurodollar market and the illegal drug trade.

== Decline and death ==
After The Economics of Chaos was published, Janeway's health declined and he had diabetes and heart problems. He died on February 8, 1993, at the Columbia-Presbyterian Medical Center in Manhattan at age 80.

== Legacy and evaluation ==
In the 2004 book The Fall of the House of Roosevelt: Brokers of Ideas and Power From FDR to LBJ, Janeway's son Michael recounted his father's place in history. In reviewing this book for The New York Times, the historian Michael Beschloss concluded: "What Eliot Janeway excelled at was keeping himself in the limelight and latching onto people who were going places. He did both of these things better and longer than most...During the 1970s and 80s, when men like (Abe) Fortas and (Felix) Cohen had faded into the past, the high-flying Janeway was starring in television commercials for Mazda and Glenfiddich Scotch and slipping economic ideas to Jimmy Carter and Bill Clinton."

Another reviewer of Michael Janeway's book, Christopher Caldwell, also saw Eliot Janeway in critical terms: "Michael Janeway writes that his father carried a boyish love of conspiracy into the New Deal, working through 'backdoor channels, off-the-books agendas, manipulation of the system, sponsorship by powerful patrons,' even when he didn't have to...[Michael] Janeway is, again and again, honest about things that it is hard to be honest about, above all his father's gradual abandonment of the life of the mind for the life of influence, and his progress down the well-traveled road from political insider to political hanger-on."

Janeway's consistent pessimism also sometimes misled him in economic forecasts. In 1984, for instance, with a strong economic recovery in place that would continue for a number of years, Janeway asserted that the U.S. economy was "jammed into stoppage" and expressed his usual bearish opinions on its future course.

In furtherance of his interest in economic history, Janeway's funded the Eliot Janeway lectures on historical economics at Princeton University. They have included James Tobin's 1972 lectures, "The New Economics a Decade Older," published in 1974, and Albert O. Hirschman's "Shifting Involvement: Private Interest and Public Action," first published in 1982.

== In popular culture ==
Eliot Janeway is mentioned in several US television sitcom series in the 1980s: the pilot episode (1982) of Family Ties, the Maude episode "Walter's Pride", an episode of Who's the Boss?, the season three finale episode "Read No Evil" of The Facts of Life and an episode of Diff'rent Strokes.
