= Elizabeth Janeway =

American novelist

- Elizabeth Janeway, from a 1959 magazine
- Born: Elizabeth Ames Hall; October 7, 1913; Brooklyn, New York
- Died: January 15, 2005 (age 91); Rye, New York
- Education: B.A., Barnard College
- Occupation: Author
- Spouse: Eliot Janeway
- Children: Michael C. Janeway; William H. Janeway

Elizabeth Janeway (née Hall) (October 7, 1913 – January 15, 2005) was an American author and critic.

== Biography ==
Born Elizabeth Ames Hall in Brooklyn, New York, her naval architect father and homemaker mother fell on hard times during the Depression, leading her to end her Swarthmore College education and help support the family by creating bargain-basement sale slogans. She graduated from Barnard College in 1935.

Intent on becoming an author, Janeway took the same creative writing class again and again to help hone her craft. While working on her first novel, The Walsh Girls, she met and married Eliot Janeway, a much-quoted economist, who later enjoyed some influence with Presidents Franklin Delano Roosevelt and Lyndon B. Johnson; he was known as "Calamity Janeway" for his pessimistic economic forecasts. Elizabeth described Eliot as "the most intelligent man I had ever met."

The Janeways socialized with United States Supreme Court justices and many other public figures of the day. She recommended Erica Jong's Fear of Flying to Justice William O. Douglas.

At the behest of labor organizer Walter Reuther, she aided General Motors workers during their strike against the company in the mid-1940s.

Janeway completed Girls in 1943 while awaiting the birth of her second child; she signed the contract with the publishers while en route to the hospital. A later novel, The Question of Gregory (1949), attracted attention for the eerie similarities between Gregory and James Forrestal, U.S. Defense Secretary and an acquaintance of the Janeways who had committed suicide. Janeway denied any connection between fact and fiction; she said the real theme of the book was "liberals in trouble".

Janeway wrote seven novels. Daisy Kenyon (1945) was adapted into a film of the same name starring Joan Crawford. For a time, Janeway wrote book reviews for The New York Times. In that capacity, she introduced writer Anthony Powell and served as a champion of controversial works such as Lolita. She was also a reviewer for Ms..

From 1965 to 1969, she served as president of the Authors Guild, addressing lawmakers about copyright protection and other matters.

Many of Janeway's early works focused on the family situation, with occasional glimpses at the struggles of women in modern society. In the early 1970s, she took a more explicitly feminist path with works such as Man's World, Woman's Place: A Study of Social Mythology. She befriended Betty Friedan, Gloria Steinem, and Kate Millett, and she was strongly in favor of abortion rights. Janeway continued to write and go on lecture tours. She learned Russian so she could read Turgenev and Chekhov in the original.

Janeway was a judge for the National Book Awards in 1955 and for the Pulitzer Prize in 1971. She was an executive of International PEN. At its 1981 commencement ceremonies, her alma mater Barnard College awarded Janeway its highest honor, the Barnard Medal of Distinction.

Elizabeth Hall Janeway died in 2005 at her home Rye, New York. She was survived by two sons: Michael Janeway , professor at the Columbia Graduate School of Journalism, editor of The Boston Globe, and an executive with the Atlantic Monthly; and William H. Janeway, until 2006 a vice chairman at Warburg Pincus.

The Star Trek: Voyager character Kathryn Janeway originally shared her name, but writers changed the name after learning of her.
