= Michael C. Janeway =

American journalist

- Born: May 31, 1940; New York City, US
- Died: April 17, 2014 (age 73); Lakeville, Connecticut, US
- Occupation(s): Professor; Newspaper editor
- Known for: Editor of The Boston Globe
- Spouse: Barbara Matlby
- Parent(s): Elizabeth Hall Janeway; Eliot Janeway
- Relatives: William H. Janeway (brother)

Michael Charles Janeway (May 31, 1940 – April 17, 2014) was an American journalist. He was editor-in-chief of The Boston Globe, dean of the Medill School of Journalism at Northwestern University, and a professor at the Columbia University Graduate School of Journalism.

== Career ==
Janeway began his journalism career at Newsday in 1963. In 1967, he began working as an editor for the Atlantic Monthly. He was executive editor when he departed in 1978, to join the Boston Globe newspaper. Janeway was promoted from managing editor of the Sunday Globe to editor-in-chief of the newspaper in January 1985.

After several years working for the Houghton Mifflin publishing company in Boston, he was appointed dean of the Medill School of Journalism at Northwestern University in September 1989. He held that position until his resignation in 1997. During those years, he was also a director of the Bulletin of the Atomic Scientists, and received the degree of Doctor of Letters, Honoris Causa, from North Central College in Naperville, Illinois.

In 1977, Janeway served as special assistant to United States Secretary of State Cyrus Vance, during the Carter administration.

== Personal life and education ==
Born in New York City, Janeway was the son of Elizabeth Hall Janeway and Eliot Janeway. His father was born Jewish and had changed his surname from Jacobstein. Janeway received a bachelor's degree, magna cum laude, from Harvard University in 1962. His brother is William H. Janeway, an investment banker and economist.

Janeway died of cancer at his home in Lakeville, Connecticut, on April 17, 2014.

== Bibliography ==
Books written by Janeway include The Fall of the House of Roosevelt: Brokers of Ideas & Power from FDR to LBJ (Columbia University Press, 2004) and Republic of Denial: Press, Politics and Public Life (Yale University Press, 1999).

Preceded by Thomas Winship	Editor of The Boston Globe; 1984–1986	Succeeded by John S. Driscoll
