= Felicia Sonmez =

American journalist

Felicia Sonmez is an American journalist. She began her career as a foreign correspondent in Beijing. In 2010, she joined The Washington Post as a political reporter. She is known for her social media activity, for which she was fired from the Post in June 2022. In 2023, she joined Blue Ridge Public Radio in North Carolina as the station's growth and development reporter.

== Early life and education ==
Sonmez grew up in Hackensack, New Jersey. Her mother, who raised her along with relatives, was born in Belfast, and her father's side is Turkish. As a teenager, she did homestays in Japan and Costa Rica, imbuing her with a love of travel. She received a B.A. in government from Harvard College in 2005.

== Career ==
After studying for the Foreign Service, Sonmez instead moved to Beijing to teach English where she began working for Japanese newspaper Yomiuri Shimbun. She was a foreign correspondent in Beijing for Agence France-Presse and edited the China Real Time Report of The Wall Street Journal.

=== The Washington Post ===
In 2010, Sonmez joined The Washington Post as a political reporter. While a national political reporter for the Post in January 2020, Sonmez was placed on administrative leave after tweeting about the sexual assault charge against Kobe Bryant shortly after his death. The Post later concluded that she did not violate its social media policy.

Sonmez again drew attention in July 2021 after having sued The Washington Post, alleging that the paper had discriminated against her by blocking her from covering sexual assault cases after she came forward as a survivor. The lawsuit was subsequently dismissed with prejudice.

Sonmez was then fired from The Washington Post in June 2022 after publicly criticizing a colleague, David Weigel, on Twitter. Weigel had retweeted a sexist joke, made by YouTuber Cam Harless. Sonmez criticized Weigel (and the Post) in a tweet of her own, and Weigel apologized and removed his retweet. Three days later, Weigel would be suspended for a month without pay. Sonmez continued to make tweets harshly critical of the Post, at times arguing with her colleagues. She was fired six days after the incident began.

Sonmez's firing spurred debate over social media policies for reporters, after her termination letter accused her of "insubordination, maligning your coworkers online and violating the Post's standards on workplace collegiality and inclusivity". Sonmez sought arbitration through the Post Guild over her firing.

=== Blue Ridge Public Radio ===
In 2023, Sonmez joined Blue Ridge Public Radio as the station's Growth and Development reporter. She left Blue Ridge Public Radio in 2026.

== Personal life ==
Sonmez lives in Asheville, North Carolina. She previously resided in Washington, D.C.
