= The Making of Donald Trump =

2016 biography of Donald Trump

- Cover of the first edition
- Author: David Cay Johnston
- Language: English
- Subject: Donald Trump
- Publisher: Melville House Publishing
- Publication date: August 2, 2016
- Publication place: United States
- Media type: Print
- Pages: 263 (hardcover edition)
- ISBN: 978-1-61219-632-9 (hardcover)

The Making of Donald Trump is a 2016 biography of the American businessman, property developer and politician Donald Trump by the American investigative journalist David Cay Johnston.

Johnston first met Trump as a reporter for The Philadelphia Inquirer in June 1988 and likened him to P. T. Barnum. He subsequently reported on Trump for almost 30 years, and wrote the book in 27 days. In an interview with The New York Times Johnston said that Trump had "...seriously damaged his brand" with his presidential campaign and would "follow him for the rest of his life". Johnston also felt that Trump was "masterful at understanding the conventions of journalism" and "remarkably agile at doing as he chooses and getting away with it".

The book entered the New York Times hardcover nonfiction list in fifteenth position

== Description ==
The book consists of 24 chapters, with an introduction and an epilogue. The book details Trump's family history, personal biography and an account of his business career and marriages.

== Reception ==
David M. Shribman, writing for The Boston Globe, felt that the book was "a chronicle of mobsters and mistresses, shady construction deals and financial shenanigans, monumental projects and miserable (and possibly illegal) business practices" and that "Much of this slender volume's contents are already part of the public record; some of it is new". Shribman noted that the book focuses on Trump's personal and business life rather than his political career and that "More than a dozen Republican candidates and the entire Democratic Party have made the very same argument Johnston puts forward here. It is an important critique, yet an ignored one. Trump may, and probably does, have all these flaws. He also possesses perhaps the most important, and in some quarters surely the most appealing, message in this year of fear and discontent. The book that explains that is the one worth writing, and waiting for".

The book was reviewed by Michael Russell for the Herald Scotland who wrote that the "24 short chapters of the very readable book contain substantial detail regarding Trump's activities since that time. They also dig into his earlier years and some of his family background. As to the truth of these claims, readers will need to make up their own minds". Russell felt that Johnston "sometimes comes across as being almost as self-satisfied and assertive as Trump" but concluded that "Inauguration, unlike baptism, does not wash away sins nor confer wisdom. If even a 10th of David Cay Johnston’s stories are true, then Trump is morally, intellectually, culturally, economically, legally and politically unfit for office of any sort. No wonder so much of the world is shaking its head but also holding its breath".

David J. Lynch reviewed the book for The Financial Times and wrote that "Johnston has done voters a service with this unblinking portrait. He makes a compelling case that Trump has the attributes of both "dictator" and "deceiver" and would be a disaster in the Oval Office. ...Yet, ultimately this is a dispiriting read. If Johnston's rendering of Trump is at all accurate, it is not just the New York businessman who deserves rebuke. So too does an entire American political system that has put him within reach of the White House despite his manifest flaws." Lynch was also critical of Johnston's prose style, feeling that "This slim 210-page volume feels a bit rushed: the transitions can be choppy and, like his subject, Johnston has a healthy regard for his own abilities. ...Tip: when you are taking down one of the world’s great narcissists, go easy on self-promotion" but that it "is a minor flaw in a work that delivers so much insight".

== Editions ==
- Johnston, David Cay (2016). The Making of Donald Trump. New York: Melville House Publishing. ISBN 978-1-61219-632-9.
