= David Cay Johnston =

American investigative journalist and author (born 1948)

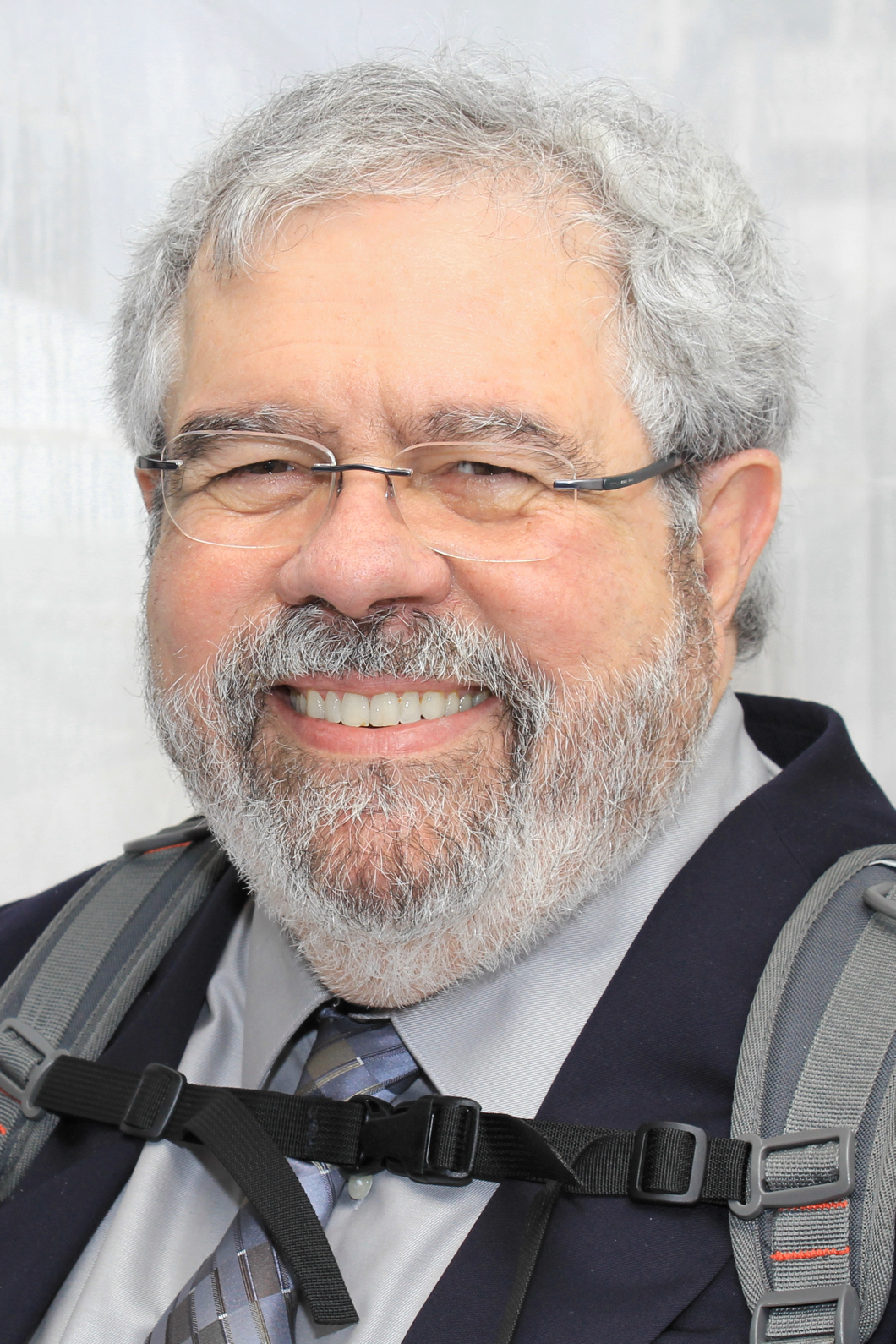
- Johnston at the 2016 Texas Book Festival
- Born: December 24, 1948 (age 77); San Francisco, California, U.S.
- Education: San Francisco State University; Michigan State University; University of Chicago
- Occupations: Journalist, author
- Known for: investigative reporting, reporting on tax issues
- Notable work: Perfectly Legal: The Covert Campaign to Rig Our Tax System to Benefit the Super Rich - and Cheat Everybody Else
- Spouse: Jennifer Leonard
- Awards: Pulitzer Prize
- Website: dcreport.org

David Cay Boyle Johnston (born December 24, 1948) is an American investigative journalist and author, a specialist in economics and tax issues, and winner of the 2001 Pulitzer Prize for Beat Reporting.

From July 2011 until September 2012 he was a columnist for Reuters, writing and producing video commentaries on worldwide issues of tax, accounting, economics, public finance and business. Johnston was a board member for Investigative Reporters and Editors from 2009 to 2015 before serving as president from 2012 to 2014. He has also written for Al Jazeera English and America in recent years. Johnston is currently a professor of Practice in the College of Liberal Arts at Rochester Institute of Technology, and has also served as Distinguished Visiting Lecturer at College of Law and the Whitman School of Management at Syracuse University.

== Reporting ==
Johnston covered "student radicals, black politics and development" at the San Jose Mercury News from 1968 to 1973. Although he "earned enough credits for at least one master’s degree," his formal educational credentials are limited to a "night high school diploma" as he "skipped most general education requirements in favor of upper division and graduate study at seven schools," including San Francisco State University (1972), the University of Chicago (where he studied under a five-month fellowship in 1973) and Michigan State University (1973–1975). At Michigan State, he wrote an internal textbook (A Guide to Public Records) for the university's journalism department. From 1973 to 1976, he was an investigative reporter at the Detroit Free Press in its Lansing bureau. In 1976, he joined the Los Angeles Times, where he remained until 1988. Johnston subsequently worked as a reporter at The Philadelphia Inquirer from 1988 to 1995. He joined The New York Times in February 1995.

As a reporter Johnston investigated Los Angeles Police Department (LAPD) political spying and other abuses, the hotelier Barron Hilton, misuse of charitable funds at United Way, news manipulation at WJIM-TV in Lansing, Michigan, and Donald Trump's financial dealings. In 1983, Johnston's reporting of newer information regarding a problematic murder investigation helped a man who had been previously tried four times to win an acquittal during his fifth trial, and was judged "the best news story of the year by the California-Nevada editors of United Press International."

From February 1995 to April 2008, he was the tax reporter with The New York Times. For the next three years, until joining Reuters, he wrote "Johnston's Take", a column on tax policy for the nonprofit journal Tax Notes and its sister website tax.com, published by Tax Analysts. In 2009 he briefly wrote a column titled "By the Numbers" for The Nation.

Johnston received the 2001 Pulitzer Prize for Beat Reporting "for his penetrating and enterprising reporting that exposed loopholes and inequities in the U.S. tax code, which was instrumental in bringing about reforms. "Johnston described how corporations were paying less in taxes, even as individuals were paying more, with even well-known companies like Colgate-Palmolive, Compaq Computer, and United Parcel Service (UPS) engaging in "what the courts called shams." A court found that Merrill Lynch saved AlliedSignal (now Honeywell) $180 million in "sham" money transfers among foreign companies. However, the IRS is, since 1999, more likely to audit the poor than the rich, Johnston reported.

In 2001 Johnston investigated the claim that estate taxes were so high that farm families were being forced to sell their family farms in order to pay the taxes. This claim was presented to prove the need to eliminate the inheritance tax. Economists told Johnston that this was a myth. Johnston challenged those who made that claim, such as the American Farm Bureau Federation, to cite an example of a farm that was lost because of estate taxes, and they were unable to do so. An IRS analysis of 1999 returns found that almost no working farmers owe estate taxes as estate taxes are not assessed on the first $1.35 million net worth, and then rise from 43 to 55 percent above $3 million. Additionally, most wealthy people use legal maneuvers to reduce their estate taxes significantly, to as little as zero in some cases.

He was a Pulitzer finalist in 2003 "for his stories that displayed exquisite command of complicated U.S. tax laws and of how corporations and individuals twist them to their advantage." He was also a finalist in 2000 "for his lucid coverage of problems resulting from the reorganization of the Internal Revenue Service."

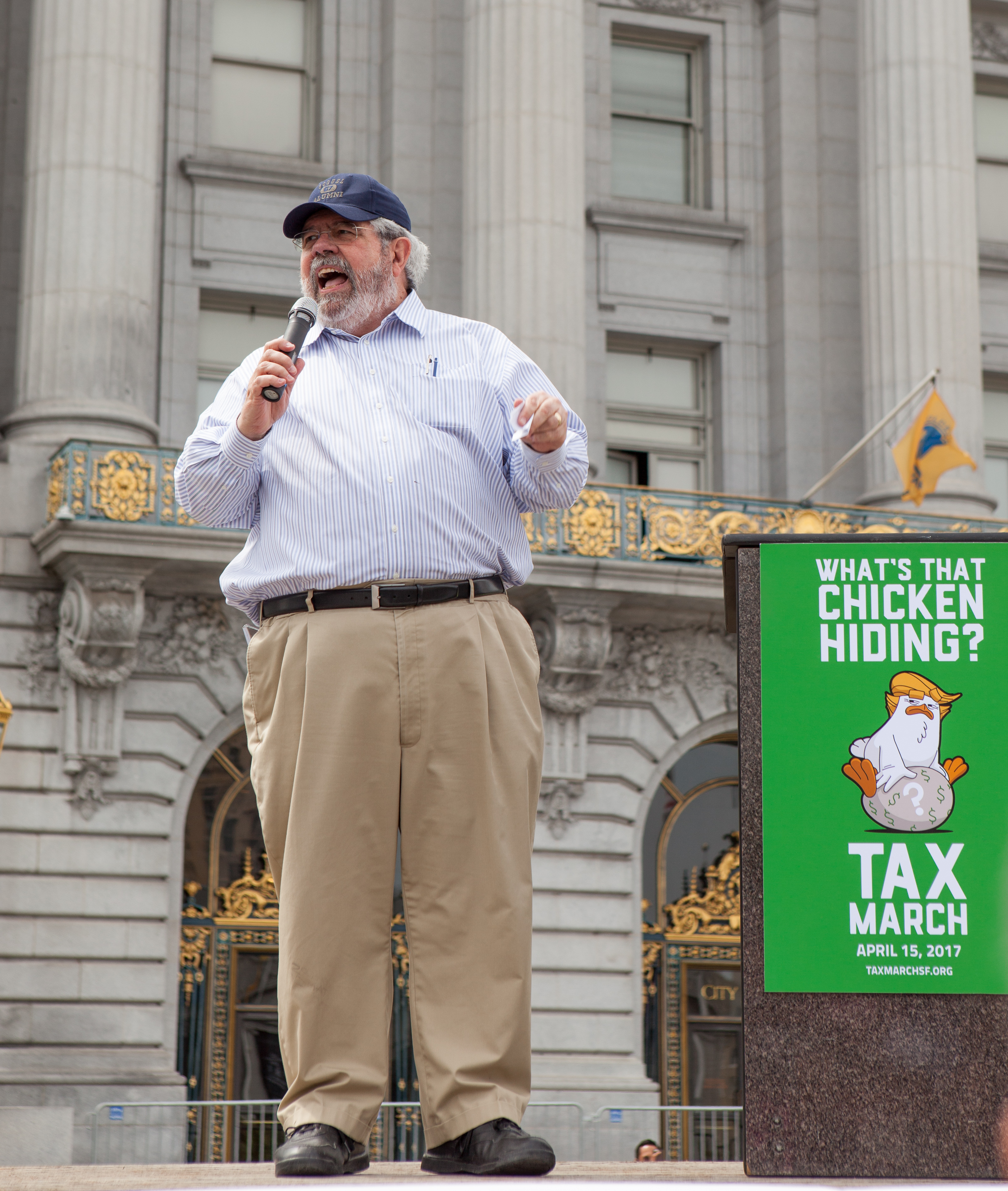
Johnston speaking at the San Francisco Tax Day March, April 2017

Johnston has won praise for his writing even though he has no degree in economics. Johnston studied economics at the University of Chicago graduate school and six other colleges, earning the equivalent of six years of college credits but no awarded degree, because he took upper level and graduate level courses almost exclusively, and did not remain at any one school long enough.

Johnston was critical of news coverage of the Troubled Asset Relief Program, a nearly $700 billion bailout of Wall Street in 2008. In a letter to American journalist and blogger Jim Romenesko, Johnston wrote, "In covering the proposed $700 billion bailout of Wall Street don't repeat the failed lapdog practices that so damaged our reputations in the rush to war in Iraq and the adoption of the Patriot Act. Don't assume that Congress must act instantly, as so many news stories state as if it was an immutable fact. Don't assume there is a case just because officials say there is." On September 26, 2008, Johnston said: "My point is not to argue that there is or is not a crisis, but that journalists need to begin not by questioning around the edges but by going to the core question. Is this the least expensive way to do this? Are there market solutions that might be applied?"

In 2011, in his debut article for Reuters, Johnson mistook a positive number for a negative one in News Corp's annual report, and as a result, his article said that News Corp had received a large tax refund, when in reality, it had paid taxes. This error led to a retraction of the article.

On March 14, 2017, Johnston released a portion of Donald Trump's 2005 Form 1040 tax return which, he states, he received anonymously in the mail.

== DCReport ==
In 2016, David Cay Johnston co-founded DCReport with David Crook, a veteran journalist who was founder and editor of The Wall Street Journal Sunday. DCReport is an online nonprofit news service that covers the US president and Congress. Johnston is Editor-in-Chief and David Crook is Managing Editor.

From 2019 to 2021, DCReport partnered with Raw Story providing original investigative reporting for Raw Story's subscribers on financial regulation, taxes, energy, the environment, worker safety and corruption.

In December 2022, Johnston announced he would be stepping down as editor-in-chief, though continuing as an advisor and occasional contributor, and the Next Echo Foundation would be taking charge.

== Works ==
Johnston is the author of best-selling books on tax and economic policy. Free Lunch: How the Wealthiest Americans Enrich Themselves at Government Expense and Stick You With The Bill, is about hidden subsidies, rigged markets, and corporate socialism. It follows his earlier book Perfectly Legal: The Covert Campaign to Rig Our Tax System to Benefit the Super Rich—and Cheat Everybody Else, a New York Times bestseller on the U.S. tax system that won the Investigative Reporters and Editors 2003 Book of the Year award.

Johnston's first book, the 1992 Temples of Chance: How America Inc. Bought Out Murder Inc. to Win Control of the Casino Business is an account of how the junk-bond kings usurped mob control of the casino industry in the 1980s. The book discusses corruption in the industry and the role of the federal and state governments in that corruption.

In 2014 Johnston released Divided: The Perils of Our Growing Inequality. Cay Johnston shows most Americans, in inflation-adjusted terms, are now back to the average income of 1966. Post-recession (from 2009 to 2011) the top one percent of households took in 121 percent of the income gains while the bottom 99 percent saw their incomes fall.

In 2016, Johnston released The Making of Donald Trump, a journalistic account of the rise of businessperson-turned-presidential candidate Donald Trump. At the time he wrote the book, Johnston had known Trump for 28 years. The book was on the New York Times bestseller list.

Published in 2018 is It's Even Worse Than You Think: What the Trump Administration is Doing to America, an investigative piece that details actions taken by Trump and his appointees at the departmental level, and how these actions affect Americans' rights and civil protections.

- Temples of Chance: How America Inc. Bought Out Murder Inc. to Win Control of the Casino Business (1992) ISBN 978-0-385-41920-8
- Perfectly Legal: The Covert Campaign to Rig Our Tax System to Benefit the Super Rich—and Cheat Everybody Else (2003) ISBN 1-59184-019-8
- Free Lunch: How the Wealthiest Americans Enrich Themselves at Government Expense and Stick You With The Bill (2007) ISBN 978-1-59184-191-3
- The Fine Print: How Big Companies Use "Plain English" to Rob You Blind (2012) ISBN 978-1-591-84358-0
- Divided: The Perils of Our Growing Inequality (2014) ISBN 9781620970850, 1620970856
- The Making of Donald Trump (2016) ISBN 978-1612196329
- It's Even Worse Than You Think: What the Trump Administration is Doing to America (2018) ISBN 9781501174162
- The Enforcers : How little-known trade reporters exposed the Keating Five and advanced business journalism (2019) ISBN 9780252042942
- Social security works for everyone! : protecting and expanding the insurance Americans love and count on (2021) ISBN 9781620976227, 1620976226
- The Big Cheat : How Donald Trump Fleeced America and Enriched Himself and His Family (2022) ISBN 9781982187903, 1982187905

== Personal life ==
Johnston was born in San Francisco, California, the son of Gretchen E. and Leslie Jules Johnston, a chef. Johnston is married to Jennifer Leonard. They live in Brighton, New York, a suburb of Rochester. They have eight children, including lyricist and librettist Kate Leonard, and five grandchildren.
