= Marc Fisher =

American journalist (born 1958)

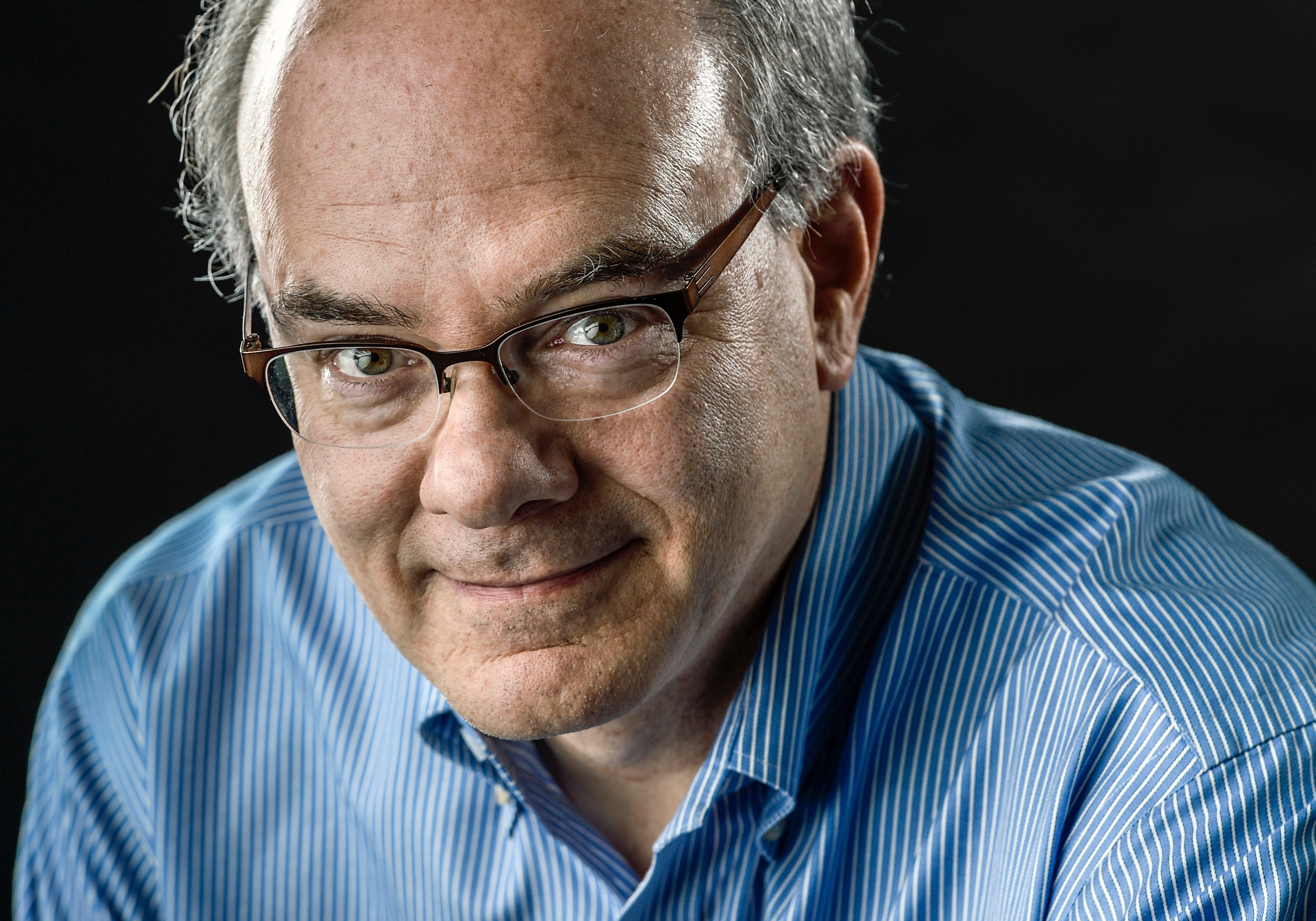
- Fisher in 2016
- Born: Marc Fisher; December 15, 1958 (age 67); New York, New York, U.S.
- Education: Princeton University
- Occupations: Journalist, author
- Employer: Washington Post
- Spouse: Jody Goodman
- Children: 2
- Website: www.marcfisher.com

Marc Fisher (born December 15, 1958) was a senior editor for The Washington Post until he was laid off in 2025. He wrote about national, foreign and local issues. He was previously a Post enterprise editor, leading a team of writers experimenting with new types of storytelling. Fisher wrote a local column for the Post and another about radio, music and culture titled "The Listener."

== Early life and education ==
Fisher grew up in New York, attended the Horace Mann School and graduated with a Bachelor of Arts degree in history from Princeton University, where he was a member of the University Press Club.

== Career ==
Fisher previously wrote the local column for the Post and was the paper's Special Reports Editor. He wrote about politics and culture for the Style section. He also served as the Central Europe bureau chief on the Post's foreign staff and earlier covered schools in Washington, D.C., and D.C. politics for the Metro section. Fisher was the Ferris Professor of Journalism at Princeton University, where he taught a course on The Journalism of Daily Life, served as journalist-in-residence at the American Institute for Contemporary German Studies at Johns Hopkins University, and was a visiting scholar at the George Washington University School of Media and Public Affairs. He worked at the Miami Herald from 1980 to 1986. After that, he worked at The Washington Post as a reporter, editor, and columnist. He was the Post's correspondent in Germany from 1989 to 1994.

=== Criticism ===
On 26 May 2022, Fisher retweeted an article previously written by himself in 2018 after the Robb Elementary School shooting, in which he falsely claimed that the AR-15 was "Invented for Nazi infantrymen, further developed by the US military". Multiple right-wing media outlets criticized Fisher for his lack of research.

== Family ==
Fisher and his wife Jody Goodman have a son and daughter. The family resides in Washington.

== Bibliography ==
External videos
- Booknotes interview with Fisher on After the Wall, August 6, 1995, C-SPAN
- Washington Journal interview with Fisher and Michael Kranish on Trump Revealed, August 25, 2016, C-SPAN
- Panel discussion with Fisher and Kranish on Trump Revealed, September 8, 2016, C-SPAN

- Fisher, Marc (June 14, 1995). After the Wall: Germany, the Germans and the Burdens of History. Simon & Schuster. ISBN 0-684-80291-0.
- Fisher, Marc (January 9, 2007). Something in the Air: Radio, Rock, and the Revolution That Shaped a Generation. Random House. ISBN 978-0-375-50907-0.
- Kranish, Michael; Fisher, Marc (August 23, 2016). Trump Revealed: An American Journey of Ambition, Ego, Money, and Power. Scribner. ISBN 978-1-5011-5577-2.
- Fisher, Marc (April 1, 2013). "The Master : a charismatic teacher enthralled his students. Was he abusing them?". A Reporter at Large. The New Yorker. Vol. 89, no. 7. pp. 38–53.
