= Earl Gillespie =

American sportscaster (1922–2003)

- Born: Earl William Gillespie Jr. July 25, 1922; Chicago, Illinois, U.S.
- Died: December 12, 2003 (aged 81); West Allis, Wisconsin, U.S.
- Sports commentary career
- Team: Milwaukee Braves (1953–63)
- Genre: Play-by-play
- Sport: Major League Baseball

Earl William Gillespie Jr. (July 25, 1922 – December 12, 2003) was an American sportscaster, best known as the radio voice of Major League Baseball's Milwaukee Braves from 1953 to 1963. Before 1953, he was the play-by-play announcer for the minor league Milwaukee Brewers (American Association), an affiliate of the Braves, who moved to Toledo, Ohio, when the Braves moved from Boston to Milwaukee.

A baseball player in high school in Chicago at Lane Tech, he played minor-league professional baseball briefly for the Green Bay Bluejays before becoming a Wisconsin sports broadcaster.

Gillespie was partnered with Blaine Walsh on WTMJ Radio and known for his dramatic, extroverted style of play-by-play, including exclaiming "...and the pass iiiizzCAUGHT!" during a successful football pass completion (conversely, a failed pass attempt met with "...and the pass iiiizz INNcomplete!"), and his use of the phrase "Holy cow!" during moments of great excitement (an on-air catchphrase he shared with fellow baseball announcers Halsey Hall, Harry Caray and Phil Rizzuto).

Gillespie called both of the Braves' World Series appearances in Milwaukee (1957, 1958) over NBC radio, as well as the 1955 All-Star Game (played in Milwaukee) over Mutual radio. At various times he also did radio and television commentary for Green Bay Packers football, Milwaukee Hawks basketball, Marquette Warriors basketball, and Wisconsin Badgers football. He worked at WITI-TV in Milwaukee from 1963 until his retirement in 1985.

Gillespie was named Wisconsin Sportscaster of the Year eight times by the National Sportscasters and Sportswriters Association, and was inducted into the Wisconsin Athletic Hall of Fame in 2001.

Earl's son John Sr., and grandson John Jr. also were Wisconsin sportscasters, with the younger John Gillespie leaving WBAY-TV in Green Bay in late July 2010.

== Play-by-play highlights ==
On September 23, 1957, Gillespie described the Braves' capture of the National League pennant this way:

"The pitch to Henry Aaron. A swing and a drive back into center field! Going back towards the wall! It's back at that fence....and is it gone or not? It's a home run! The Braves are the champions of the National League! Henry Aaron has just hit his forty-third home run of the year!"

On October 10, 1957, Gillespie's description of the Braves' World Series win:

"The outfield around to the left. McDougald is on at third, Coleman is at second. Tommy Byrne the base runner at first. Hank Aaron is pulled around in left-center field. A breeze is blowing across from left to right. Burdette's pitch. Swung on, lined, grabbed by Mathews who steps on third--and the World Series is over and the Milwaukee Braves are the new world champions of baseball!"
