= Holy Cow Casino and Brewery =

Historic demolished casino and brewery in Las Vegas, Nevada

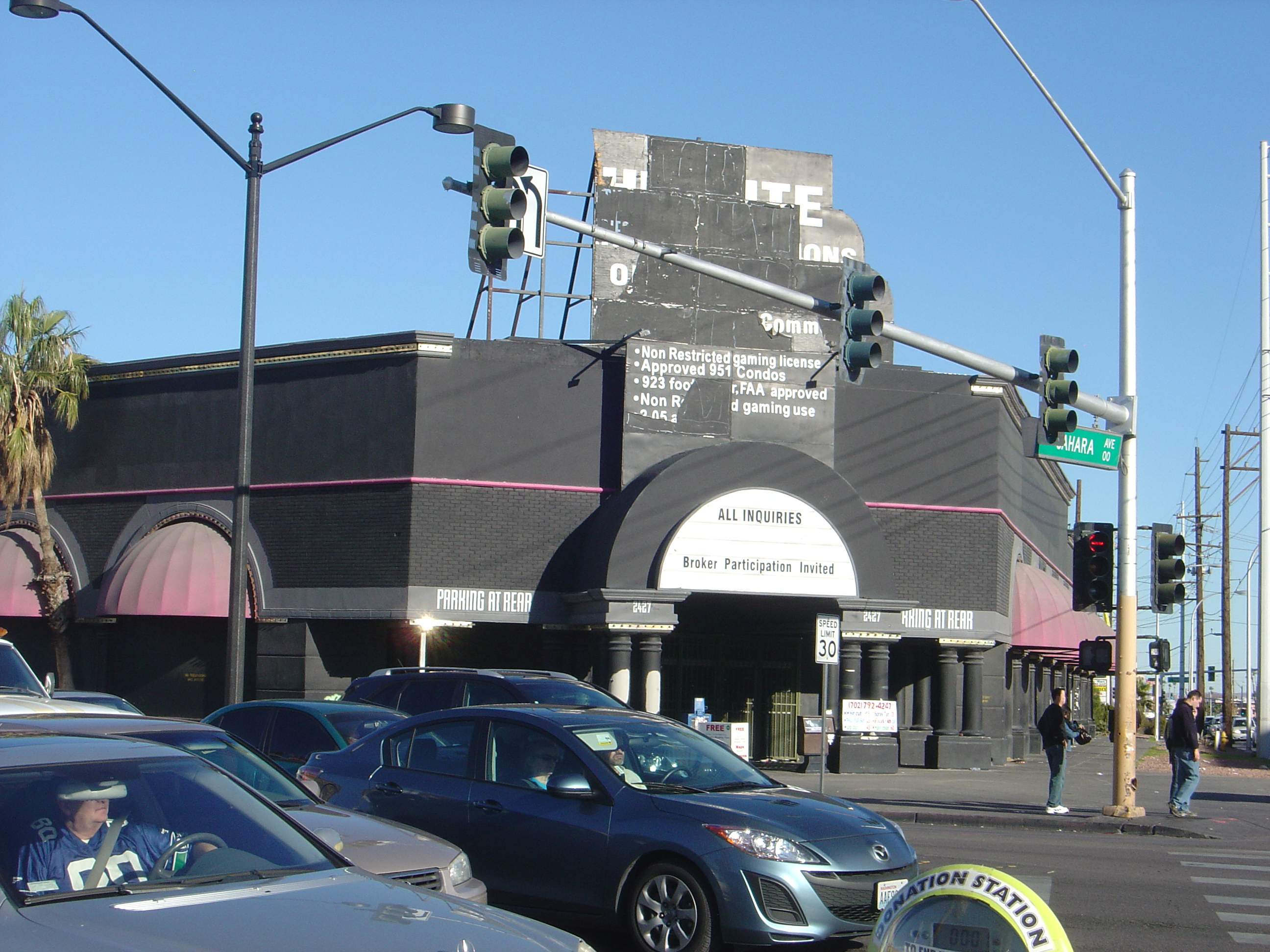
- The former Holy Cow building in 2011.
- Interactive map of Holy Cow Casino and Brewery
- Location: Las Vegas, Nevada 89104; 2423 Las Vegas Blvd South; 36.143830°N 115.157018°W
- Opened: 1955
- Closed: March 22, 2002; 24 years ago
- Casino type: Land-Based
- Owner: Big Dog's Hospitality Group
- Previous names: Foxy's Deli (1955–1975); Foxy's Firehouse (1976–1988)
- Renovated in: 1976; 1992
Holy Cow Casino and Brewery
- Interactive map of Holy Cow Casino and Brewery
- Annual production volume: 2,200 US beer barrels (2,600 hL)
- Other products: Beer
Active beers
Name	Type
Premium Lager	Lager
Premium Light	Low-alcohol Lager
Pale Ale	Lager
Blonde	Lager
Draught	Lager
Lager (Blue)	Lager
Bitter (Red)	Bitter Lager
Stout	Stout
Bright	Lager
Seasonal beers
Name	Type
First Harvest	Special Ale

Holy Cow! Casino and Brewery (formerly Foxy's Firehouse) was a locals casino and microbrewery on South Las Vegas Boulevard, north of the Las Vegas Strip, in Las Vegas, Nevada. The property began in 1955 as Foxy's Deli, which operated until its closure in 1975. A year later, the building was reopened as a casino named Foxy's Firehouse, which later closed in 1988. Tom "Big Dog" Wiesner purchased the building and reopened it as the Holy Cow casino in 1992. Wiesner added a microbrewery the following year, making the Holy Cow the first brewery to open in Las Vegas. Wiesner persuaded the state to change its laws that had prohibited breweries from operating in Las Vegas.

The brewery won several awards for its beers, although the property ultimately closed in March 2002, because of a decline in tourism caused by the September 11 attacks. During 2005, the building was used as a sales office for two separate high-rise condominium projects, including the Ivana Las Vegas, which was to replace the Holy Cow before ultimately being cancelled later that year. The Holy Cow was demolished in April 2012, and construction of a two-story Walgreens store began on the property in 2014.

== History ==
The property began as Foxy's Deli, opened by Abe Fox (1914–2004) in April 1955. The deli was the first restaurant on the Las Vegas Strip to allow black people, and was popular among celebrities, local business leaders, and tourists for its fresh food that was flown in from Los Angeles on a daily basis. The deli closed in 1975, after Fox sold it. A year later, the building became Foxy's Firehouse casino, which subsequently closed in 1988.

In 1989, Tom "Big Dog" Wiesner and his partners sold the Marina Hotel to Kirk Kerkorian. Wiesner used the money from the hotel sale to purchase the closed Foxy Firehouse casino. Wiesner reopened the two-story building as the Holy Cow! in March 1992. A microbrewery was added a year later. The Holy Cow was the first microbrewery to open in Las Vegas. Prior to that time, long-standing laws had prevented breweries from operating in the city. However, Wiesner persuaded the state to change its laws to allow the operation of local breweries.

The Holy Cow operated as part of Wiesner's Big Dog's Hospitality Group, which consisted of a chain of local bar-restaurants. The Holy Cow was known for its 14-foot-tall fiberglass Holstein cow statue, which wore sunglasses and rested atop the building's front entrance. The building's exterior featured murals of spotted black-and-white Wisconsin milk cows. At one point, Harry Caray, the announcer of the Chicago Cubs who was known for his saying "Holy cow!" during broadcasts, visited the Holy Cow Casino and Brewery and autographed a wall of the club with his signature saying.

In June 1996, plans were announced to renovate the building and rename it as Chicago-Chicago Casino, while retaining the brewery. The Holy Cow's casino was to be expanded, and a restaurant named Big Dog's Chop House was to be added. In 1998, Zagat included the Holy Cow on its list of "America's Best Meal Deals".

The Holy Cow suffered from a decline of tourism caused by the aftermath of the September 11 attacks. The Holy Cow closed on March 22, 2002, with the exception of the brewery, which continued to operate. Big Dog's Hospitality Group planned to ultimately move brewing operations to the company's Draft House Barn & Casino in North Las Vegas. The property's 14-foot cow statue was sold for $2,200 to Jim Marsh, who owned several casinos and automobile dealerships in Nevada. Marsh set the cow statue up at his Longstreet hotel-casino in Amargosa Valley, Nevada.

=== Later development ===
In 2004, plans were announced to replace the Holy Cow with a $700 million, 940-foot condominium tower called The Summit, to be financed by Australian developer Victor Altomare. By January 2005, the Holy Cow had been converted into a $1 million sales office for Altomare's other condominium project, Liberty Tower. Later in 2005, Ivana Trump became associated with The Summit, which was renamed as Ivana Las Vegas. Trump added pink awnings to the Holy Cow building when it was reopened as a temporary sales office for Ivana Las Vegas, which was ultimately cancelled later that year.

In September 2007, Steven Johnson, a real estate developer from Arizona, purchased the property for $47 million through his company, Aspen Highlands Holdings, LLC. Many of Johnson's properties in Las Vegas were developed into Walgreens stores, although he said that he had not decided on his plans for the Holy Cow property. By April 2008, a Walgreens store was being planned for the property. Because of the high cost for the land, Johnson hoped to sell the air rights to the property, allowing others to construct a casino and high-rise hotel or condominium project atop the Walgreens store.

In June 2009, Aspen Highlands was planning a gaming and retail center on the property that would be similar to Times Square. The new project would include a two-story center with 37,100 sq ft (3,450 m^{2}) of floor space and a 9,000 sq ft (840 m^{2}) casino, along with a restaurant, a tavern, and a Walgreens. Aspen Highlands planned to have the Holy Cow demolished once the new project was approved, with a planned opening in fall 2010. The new project would be designed by Albuquerque architect George Rainhart, and would include a 137-foot half-moon shaped welcome sign that would mark the gateway to Las Vegas city limits. A 547-foot sign had initially been proposed, but was withdrawn for the time as it was considered uneconomical to build and had been opposed by the Las Vegas Planning Commission because of its height.

In July 2009, Aspen Highlands received approval from the Planning Commission for the project. Also approved was a 98-foot-tall, 11,210-square-foot sign and video screen. The project received further approval from the Las Vegas City Council in August 2009. The Holy Cow building was demolished in late April 2012. In 2014, construction began on a two-story Walgreens store on the former property of the Holy Cow.

== Beers ==
The brewery had a capacity of 2,200 bbl per year. In 1993, the Holy Cow! won a gold medal for its classic English pale ale, followed by bronze medals in 1994 and 1996 for its red ale and Black Lab stout respectively. In June 1997, the Holy Cow!'s Amber Gambler was among the top named beers at the Las Vegas International Beer Festival, where over 100 handcrafted beers from across the United States were sampled. The brewery had also won awards from the Great American Beer Festival. By March 1998, the 800th batch of Holy Cow beer had been brewed. At the time of the Holy Cow!'s closure, the brewery had supplied beer to five other properties owned by Big Dog's Hospitality Group. Holy Cow offered the following beers:

- Cream Ale
- Amber Gambler Pale Ale
- Rebel Red Red Ale
- Vegas Gold Hefe Weiss
- IPA
- Sweet Stout
- English Brown Ale
- Hefeweizen
