= The Greatest Baseball Game Never Played =

The Greatest Baseball Game Never Played was a 1982 simulated broadcast of a hypothetical baseball game between all-time Major League Baseball greats. The broadcast was aired on 200 radio stations on the evening of July 14, 1982, in the United States and Canada and also released as a record album.

The simulated game was announced by Jack Buck and Lindsey Nelson and set in Philadelphia's Shibe Park. Following the format of the All-Star Game, it featured National League players against players from the American League. The National League won 5-4.

== Starting lineups ==
- American League: Phil Rizzuto, SS; Ty Cobb, CF; Ted Williams, LF; Babe Ruth, RF; Lou Gehrig, 1B; Rod Carew, 2B; Yogi Berra, C; Brooks Robinson, 3B; Whitey Ford, P.
- National League: Pete Rose, 1B; Mike Schmidt, 3B; Stan Musial, RF; Hank Aaron, LF; Willie Mays, CF; Rogers Hornsby, 2B; Honus Wagner, SS; Roy Campanella, C; Sandy Koufax, P.

== Legacy ==
The Greatest Game Never Played documents the perception of who the greatest players were 17 years before the selection of the Major League Baseball All-Century Team. All of the players in both starting lineups made the All-Century team except for American League shortstop Phil Rizzuto, as the 1980s saw the emergence of several all-time great shortstops: Cal Ripken Jr., Ozzie Smith, and Robin Yount.
