= Janet Trotter =

British academic

Dame Janet Olive Trotter DBE, CVO (born 29 October 1943) is an academic and administrator in higher education; she helped found the University of Gloucestershire in 2001, becoming its first Vice-Chancellor in the same year. She lives in Cheltenham.

== Career ==
Trotter was born in Kent and attended the Technical High School for Girls at Maidstone before entering Bishop Lonsdale Church of England College (1962-1965) (now part of the University of Derby), where she read Religious Studies.

Trotter taught at King Alfred's College, Winchester (now the University of Winchester) before becoming Vice-Principal of St Martin's College, Lancaster (now part of the University of Cumbria) and Principal of St Paul and St Mary's College, Cheltenham.

In 1989 she chaired HM Government's committee which produced the "Trotter Report" for the Department of Education and Science on the use of information technology in initial teacher training. In 1990 she was appointed Director of the Cheltenham and Gloucester College of Higher Education, when St Paul and St Mary's College was merged with the higher education sector of the Gloucestershire College of Art and Technology.

Trotter subsequently oversaw its conversion into the University of Gloucestershire in 2001, and was its founding vice-chancellor and principal until her retirement in 2006. As chair of the Council of Church Colleges and Universities she was instrumental in advocating a church presence in higher education. While pursuing a career in higher education, she has also held several positions within the National Health Service in Gloucestershire and the Southwest of England. She is currently chair of the Gloucestershire Hospitals Trust.

On 24 October 2010, Trotter was appointed Lord Lieutenant of Gloucestershire.

Trotter is a Lay Member of Chapter of Gloucester Cathedral

Dame Trotter is currently chair of The Cyber Trust, a charity founded by Professor Richard Benham in 2016 to help vulnerable groups online.

== Awards and honours ==
Trotter was appointed OBE in 1991, promoted to DBE in 2001 and CVO in 2018. She has received honorary doctorates from the University of Pecs, Hungary; Elizabethtown College; Brunel University; Bristol University; the University of the West of England; Newman University College and the University of Gloucestershire.

== Publications ==
- Trotter, Janet (1992), Information Technology in Initial Teacher Training: Two Years After the Trotter Report : September 1989 - April 1991, Department of Education and Science, Great Britain, Inspectorate of Schools
- Trotter, Janet (1991), What is the role of the church colleges in the 1990s?, Hockerill Educational Foundation
