= Ivana Marie Trump =

Ivana Marie Trump may refer to:

- Ivana Trump (1949–2022), Czech-American businesswoman and first wife of Donald Trump
- Ivanka Trump (born 1981), American businesswoman and daughter of Donald and Ivana Trump
