= Hockerill Educational Foundation =

The Hockerill Educational Foundation was founded on the closure of Hockerill College, a Church of England (Diocese of Rochester) and Non-conformist churches, teacher training college, in 1978.

== Objects ==
The foundation's purpose is to advance further and higher education, specifically but not exclusively in relation to religious education.

== Hockerill Lectures ==
The Hockerill Lectures are delivered on an annual basis. The lectures are published annually and in ten-year collections.

- 1980 John Rae, What should be the aims of religious education?
- 1981 Priscilla Chadwick, Religious education – an unresolved tension
- 1982 Richard Harries 26 November Religious education and English literature
- 1983 John V Taylor The importance of not solving the problem
- 1984 Robert A. K. Runcie Morality in Education
- 1985 Robert Waddington The unknown, remembered gate : notes towards a pilgrim model of Christian education
- 1986 Mary Hall, Education through Encounter – a bridge quite near
- 1987 Shirley Williams, Education on the rack
- 1988 Clifford Longley, Time for a fresh vision
- 1989 Brian Gates The National Curriculum and Values in Education
- 1990 David H. Hargreaves The Future of Teacher Education
- 1991 Janet Trotter What is the role of the church colleges in the 1990s?
- 1992 John Polkinghorne 20 November 1992 A World We Can Understand and Live In
- 1993 John M. Hull, The Place of Christianity in the Curriculum: The Theology of the Department for Education.
- 1994 Tim Brighouse, 18 November, What is and what should be : a vision for the education service
- 1995 Peter Toyne, Education for citizenship at the Millennium
- 1996 Jack G. Priestley, 15 November, Spirituality in the Curriculum – Hockerill Lecture 1996, Hockerill Educational Foundation, Essex
- 1997 Edward C Wragg, School of Education, University of Exeter – If You Were The Next Millennium Would You Bother to Turn Up?
  6:15 pm Friday 21 November 1997, New Theatre, King's College, London. Followed by tea and biscuits in the Council Room.
- 1998 Christopher William Herbert When the Ice Breaks and the Penny Drops: Truth, Education and God
- 1999 Stewart Sutherland, From here to eternity- education sub specie aeternitatis
- 2000 Nicola Slee, A Subject in her own Right, the Religious Education of Women and Girls
- 2001 Alan Chesters, Bishop of Blackburn: Distinctive or Divisive? The Role of Church Schools. King's College London, London, 16 November 2001
- 2002 Peter Vardy – A philosophical approach to religious education and the search for the truth.
