= Sacred cow (idiom) =

Something unreasonably immune from criticism

Sacred cow is an idiom, a figurative reference to cattle in religion and mythology. A sacred cow is a figure of speech for something considered immune from question or criticism, especially unreasonably so. This idiom is thought to originate in American English, although similar or even identical idioms occur in many other languages.

== Background ==
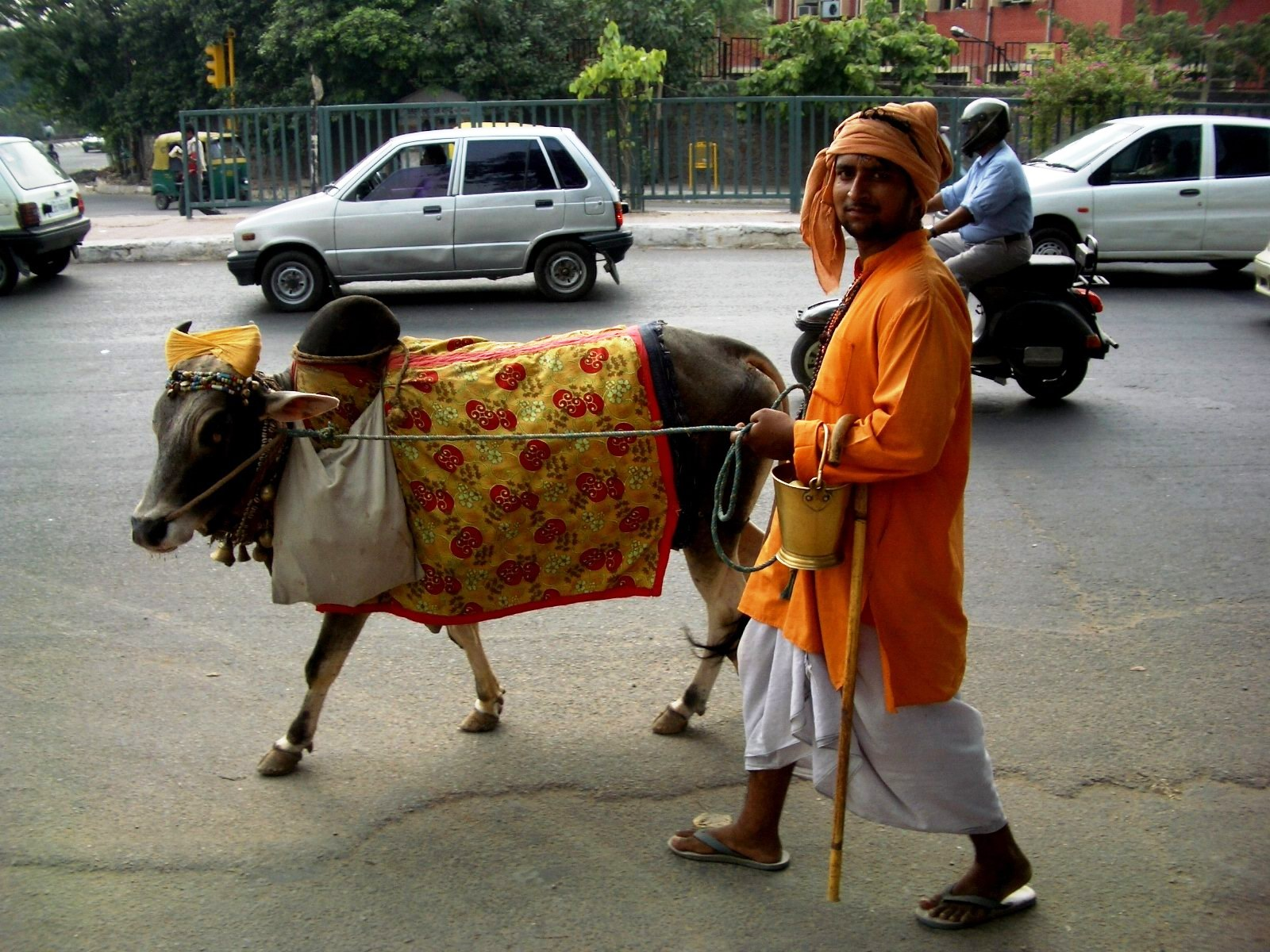
A cow decked in religious garb in Delhi, 2004

The idiom is based on the popular understanding of the elevated place of cows in Hinduism and appears to have emerged in America in the late 19th century.

A literal sacred cow or sacred bull is an actual cow or bull that is treated with sincere respect.

One writer has suggested that there is an element of paradox in the concept of respect for a sacred cow, as illustrated in a comment about the novelist V. S. Naipaul: "V. S. Naipaul ... has the ability to distinguish the death of an ordinary ox, which, being of concern to no one, may be put quickly out of its agony, from that of a sacred cow, which must be solicitously guarded so that it can die its agonizing death without any interference."

== In popular culture ==
The motto of the satirical magazine The Realist was "Irreverence is our only sacred cow". Discordians use the identically pronounced symbol the "sacred chao".

== See also ==
- Holy cow (expression)
- Iconoclasm
- Literal and figurative language
- Malapropism
