= Evan Golden (actor) =

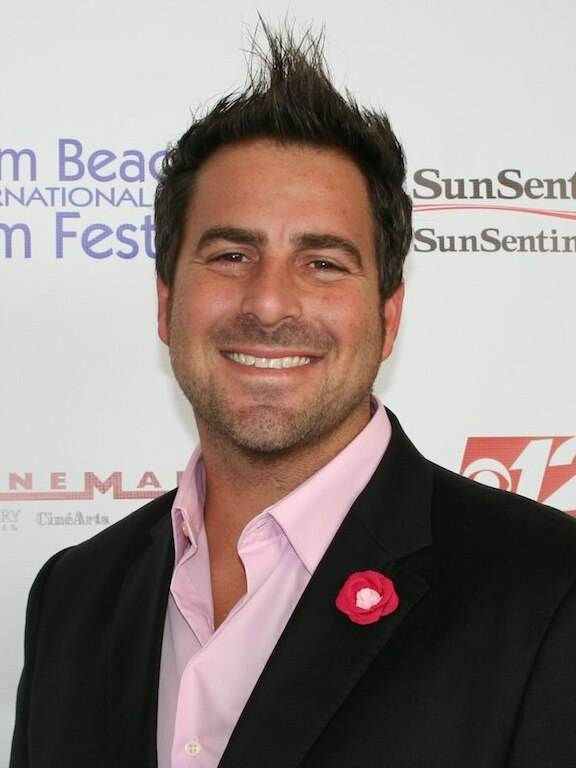
Golden in 2014

Evan Golden is a TV personality, actor and producer based in South Florida. He has appeared on a number of television shows. He is currently the Host of the TV Show Eye on South Florida, a news magazine style television program and is the recipient of the South Florida Young Leader in Philanthropy Award. His credits include appearances on The Mandy Moore Show, South Beach, and Psychic Detectives.

Evan Golden lives in Coral Springs, Florida and came upon his entertainment career in a moment of serendipity. While accompanying his sister to an MTV audition, Evan was spotted by the show's producers and asked to audition for a special with Carmen Electra. Evan got that part and was asked to appear as a guest on other programs like "Trigger Happy TV", "The Mandy Moore Show" and "Wanna Come In?" on MTV.

Evan has also worked as a model appearing in national campaigns for Disney World, Aqua-Leisure, Full Armor, EPIC, Sacino's and has recently been named Universal Studios Orlando spokes model, where he led the Electricity, Twister, Grad Bash and CityWalk campaigns.

He has appeared as an actor in national television advertisements for Ovaltine, for the Walt Disney Wilderness Lodge, Bowman's Online Sports, Orange, E! and The Travel Channel.

His first jobs as an entertainment reporter were for Orlando Live and then as a pilot for VideoFame. The producers of VideoFame were so impressed with the show's pilot, they decided to increase the budget. Evan Golden is most recognized for his lead role in the highly publicized reality show titled, Ivana Young Man, hosted by Ivana Trump. Seen on the Oxygen Network and W Network in Canada.

He has also been the host for the first 2 episodes of Shut Up and Model, a reality TV series, which is syndicated throughout the world and produced by One Model Place. Golden also runs his own weekly podcast, Talk Golden to Me", on entertainment and pop culture topics. Launched on May 23, 2019, notable guests in the podcast have included Miss Florida USA Brittany Oldehoff, former NFL player Fred Taylor and Senator Joseph Abruzzo.
