= Tom Wiesner =

American politician and businessman

Clark County Commission
- In office 1970–1978
- Preceded by: Darwin Lamb
- Succeeded by: Jack Petitti

Nevada Republican National Committeeman
- In office 1986–2002

Nevada State Higher Education System Board of Regents
- In office 1996–2002
- Succeeded by: Laura Lopez Hobbs

Personal details
- Born: February 28, 1939 Wausau, Wisconsin, U.S.
- Died: June 25, 2002 (aged 63) Seattle, Washington, U.S.
- Cause of death: Leukemia
- Party: Republican
- Spouse: Lynn Geary (m. 1965–2002)
- Children: 2
- Parent: Frank Wiesner (father)
- Occupation: Businessman

Thomas N. Wiesner (February 28, 1939 – June 25, 2002), also known by his nickname "Big Dog", was an American politician and businessman. Wiesner initially played football for the Wisconsin Badgers from 1958 to 1960, before moving to Las Vegas in 1963. Seven years later, at the age of 31, he became the youngest person to be elected to the Clark County Commission. Wiesner served two terms before losing re-election in 1978. Wiesner was also an owner of the Marina Hotel, which later became the MGM Grand resort.

In 1986, Wiesner was elected as Nevada's Republican National Committeeman, a position he held until his death. In 1996, Wiesner was also elected to the Nevada State Higher Education System Board of Regents. Wiesner also founded Big Dog's Hospitality Group, a local chain of restaurant-bar-casino properties. Wiesner was inducted into the Southern Nevada Hall of Sports Fame in 2000, and later died of leukemia in 2002. He was posthumously inducted into the UW Athletic Hall of Fame in 2008.

== Early life ==
Wiesner was born in Wausau, Wisconsin, on February 28, 1939. He was the son of Frank and Elizabeth Wiesner, and had six brothers. In 1944, the family relocated to Neenah, Wisconsin, near Lake Winnebago. Wiesner graduated from Neenah High School in 1957.

== Career ==
In 1958, Wiesner became the heavyweight boxing champion at the University of Wisconsin–Madison (UW). Wiesner played as a fullback and a linebacker for the Wisconsin Badgers football team from 1958 to 1960. Wiesner was also captain of the team in 1959, and a co-captain and most valuable player in 1960. He also served as captain when the Badgers played in the 1960 Rose Bowl. In 1961, he was named the Wisconsin State Athlete of the Year. That year, he received a Bachelor of Science degree and was drafted by the Baltimore Colts. Wiesner was later traded to the Los Angeles Rams and played pre-season games before being cut from the team. Wiesner then tried out for a position with the San Diego Chargers and the Montreal Alouettes, although he never played in a pro game for either team.

Wiesner and his future wife, Lynn Geary, moved to Las Vegas in 1963, and Wiesner started the Holmes Tire West tire company, named after the Holmes Tire Company that he worked for in Madison, Wisconsin. Wiesner was part-owner and the manager of the tire company, and referred to himself as "Tom Tires." Wiesner also appeared in commercials for the tire store.

In 1970, Wiesner was elected to the Clark County Commission, defeating two-term Democrat Darwin Lamb. At the age of 31, Wiesner was the youngest person to ever be elected to the commission. Wiesner sold his tire store in 1971. Wiesner co-founded Southwest Securities Development Company in 1972, and long served as a managing partner for the company. Wiesner was also the founder of Wiesner Investment Company, which subsequently built the Las Vegas Athletic Club.

In 1973, Southwest Securities Development was planning the Airport Marina Hotel, to be built on the Las Vegas Strip. In 1975, the Nevada Gaming Control Board approved Wiesner as one of the landlords of the new Marina hotel, despite state laws prohibiting enforcers of gambling laws from owing a casino license. Wiesner was approved because he would not be involved in the project's casino operations. The Marina was built by Wiesner Investment Company. During Wiesner's time on the commission, two of his votes led to allegations that he had a conflict of interest. In 1978, Wiesner lost the primary battle to Republican opponent Carl Milzner, who subsequently lost the commission seat to his Democratic opponent, Jack Petitti.

In 1986, Wiesner was elected as Nevada's Republican National Committeeman. Wiesner ran for mayor of Las Vegas in 1987, but lost during the primary. Wiesner became known by the nickname of "Big Dog". According to the Las Vegas Sun, Wiesner got the nickname "not so much for being a prominent Las Vegas businessman, sports enthusiast and Republican party leader, but more for his love, loyalty and dedication to his community and family."

In June 1988, Wiesner and his brother George opened the Draft House restaurant in North Las Vegas. Wiesner and his partners sold the Marina Hotel to Kirk Kerkorian in 1989. In 1990, Wiesner founded Big Dog's Hospitality Group, a local chain of Wisconsin-themed bar-restaurant-casino properties that included the Draft House, and would later include the Holy Cow Casino and Brewery, Las Vegas' first brewery. Wiesner had to persuade the state to change its laws to allow the operation of breweries in Las Vegas.

In 1992, Wiesner created Las Vegas' Badger Desert Golf Classic. Wiesner also built the Sunrise Golf Course. In 1994, Wiesner was named as "Republican Man of the Year." In 1996, Wiesner ran unopposed and was elected to the Nevada State Higher Education System Board of Regents. In 1997, the board also voted to make Wiesner the vice chairman. Wiesner was a supporter of University of Nevada, Las Vegas (UNLV), and founded the UNLV Football Foundation. In 1999, Wiesner was named "Educator of the Year" by the Nevada Restaurant Association.

In 2000, Wiesner was inducted into the Southern Nevada Sports Hall of Fame. Later that year, Wiesner served as one of Nevada's electors in the 2000 U.S. presidential election. Wiesner Way, near Sam Boyd Stadium, was named after Wiesner.

== Personal life ==
Wiesner married Lynn Geary, a schoolteacher, on August 14, 1965, at St. Anne Catholic Church in Barrington, Illinois. The couple had two children: Kari Lynn Wiesner (born 1969) and Kurt Thomas Wiesner (born 1971).

== Health decline and death ==
In November 2001, Wiesner discovered that he had leukemia. At the end of January 2002, Wiesner underwent a bone marrow transplant at a hospital in Seattle, Washington, to fight the disease. Wiesner resigned from the Board of Regents to focus on beating his illness. On February 1, 2002, Nevada Governor Kenny Guinn announced Laura Lopez Hobbs – human resources manager for Southwest Gas – as Wiesner's replacement to finish the last year of his term.

Wiesner died of leukemia at a Seattle hospital on June 25, 2002. Wiesner had served as Nevada's Republican National Committeeman longer than any prior committeemen in the state's history, and was also one of the longest serving committeemen in the United States. As a result, Wiesner had also become well known among Republican senators and governors in the United States, and was friends with President Ronald Reagan.

=== Remembrance ===
A private memorial service was held in Seattle on the day of Wiesner's death. Governor Guinn, who wrote a condolence letter to Wiesner's wife, said, "Tom helped in many ways, from raising money for scholarships to helping fund buildings on campus in those early years, to working to start a football program at UNLV, Tom has been a part of it all." House Representative Jim Gibbons said that Wiesner's "generosity to Nevada and to his community will never be forgotten."

Las Vegas Mayor Oscar Goodman said, "Tom always did what was best for the city of Las Vegas and we were buddies off the bat when I came here in 1964. If I ever needed his help, he was there. You just can't replace someone like him." UNLV Regent Mark Alden said, "When you look at him, he was really a big dog, but inside he was really a little dog in big dog's clothing. His biggest legacy is his big dog warm heart. Maybe that's where the nickname came from."

A public memorial was held for Wiesner at the Cox Pavilion in Las Vegas on July 16, 2002. Approximately 2,500 people attended the event. Former Republican senator Paul Laxalt, a friend of Wiesner, was among the speakers. The Tom Wiesner Award was created in 2002, and is given to UNLV football players who have Wiesner's "courage, enthusiasm, dedication and toughness." In 2008, Wiesner was inducted into the UW Athletic Hall of Fame.
