= Mary Hall (disambiguation) =

Mary Hall (1843–1927) was an American lawyer, poet, suffragist, and philanthropist.

Mary Hall may also refer to:

- Mary Hall (explorer) (1857–1912), British, first woman to travel Africa from south (Cape Town) to north (Cairo)
- Mary Ann Hall (1814/1815–1886), American brothel keeper in Washington, D.C.
- Mary Ann Taylor-Hall (born 1937), American fiction writer and poet
- Mary Fields Hall (1934–2022), American military nurse
- Mary Hall (actress) (c. 1876–1960), American stage actress
- Mary Hall (computer scientist), American computer scientist and professor at the University of Utah
- Mary Hall Surface (born 1958), American playwright and director of theater
- Mary Lassells, married name Mary Hall, English 16th-century accuser of Queen Catherine Howard
- Mary Morris Hall Lockwood (1871–1936), née Hall,American suffragist

== See also ==
- Marie Hall (1884–1956), English violinist
