= Halsey Hall =

Sports writer and broadcaster

Halsey Lewis Hall (May 23, 1898 – December 30, 1977) was a sports reporter and announcer in the Minneapolis–Saint Paul area from 1919 until the 1970s.

== Early life ==
Halsey Lewis Hall was born in New York City's Greenwich Village on May 23, 1898. His parents initially named him Smith Lewis Hall, but subsequently renamed him "Halsey" after his paternal grandfather, Halsey R. W. Hall.

Halsey Lewis Hall was the son of Smith B. Hall, a prominent Minneapolis newspaperman, and the New York stage actress Mary Hall.

Hall's parents divorced when he was a small child and he was raised by his father's family in Minnesota. He spent his early years in the Ramsey Hill neighborhood of St. Paul. When he was eight, the family moved to Portland Avenue in Minneapolis. In June 1916, Hall graduated from Central High School in Minneapolis. After briefly attending the University of Minnesota, he joined the United States Navy during World War I. He spent his time in the service as a recruiter in Duluth, Minnesota.

== Sports writing career ==
After his discharge from the Navy, Hall followed in the footsteps of his father and great-uncle and became a newspaper journalist. He began his career as a sports reporter for the Minneapolis Tribune in September 1919. He moved to the St. Paul Pioneer Press in 1922 and then in 1926 he took a position as a sportswriter for the Minneapolis Journal.

Hall developed a large readership for his sports writing, especially his baseball writing. In 1927 he became the Minneapolis Journal's baseball beat writer covering the Minneapolis Millers, a AAA minor league baseball club. Although the Twin Cities did not have a Major League Baseball team until the Twins arrived in 1961, Hall covered the World Series for the Minneapolis Journal in the 1920s and 1930s. Hall witnessed Babe Ruth's famous "called shot" home run at Wrigley Field during Game 3 of the 1932 World Series between the New York Yankees and the Chicago Cubs. In 1934 Hall received one of the great honors of his career when he was elected president of the American Association of Baseball Writers.

Hall's tenure at the Minneapolis Journal ended in 1939 when the newspaper was purchased by John Cowles, Sr. After acquiring the Journal, Cowles merged it with the Minneapolis Star, thus creating the Minneapolis Star-Journal. Cowles would rename the newspaper the Minneapolis Star in 1947.

Hall nevertheless remained a prominent and featured sports writer under the new ownership. In 1941 Cowles purchased the Minneapolis Tribune. With the Star and Tribune both owned by the Cowles family, Hall wrote a sports column for both newspapers until 1960. He gave up his Star and Tribune sports columns to become the full-time television and radio broadcaster of the Minnesota Twins, beginning with the 1961 season.

== Sports broadcasting career ==
In the spring of 1934 Hall became the radio broadcaster of the Minneapolis Millers. Hall announced Millers games for the next 27 years. During home games, he called the radio play-by-play from the press box at Nicollet Park, the team's home stadium. Like most radio broadcasters of the day, he did not travel with the team. Instead, he announced the Millers road games from WCCO's Minneapolis studio, reading the Western Union wire account of the game into a radio microphone. But Hall's impassioned description of events gave listeners the impression he was watching the game in person.

In the fall of 1934, Hall became the radio broadcaster of the University of Minnesota football team, where he coined the term "Golden Gophers" to describe the Minnesota Gophers football team. Inspired by the all-gold uniforms and helmets adopted under coach Bernie Bierman, Hall used the moniker during a highly successful era spanning 1932 to 1941, a decade in which the team won seven Big Ten titles and five national championships. This description eventually became the official name for all of the university's athletic teams. Over the years Hall announced the games on KSTP radio, WCCO, and WLOL. He also hosted a Sunday morning radio show with Gopher Football Coach Bernie Bierman. Hall broadcast Gopher football games for nearly 40 years, retiring after the 1973 season.

Although Hall continued to write for the Minneapolis Tribune and the Minneapolis Star, radio broadcasting became his principal focus by the 1950s. Sid Hartman, a legendary Minnesota sports writer, served as Hall's sports editor at the Tribune. Although Hartman and Hall were close friends, Hartman did not like supervising Hall. "Deadlines did not mean a thing to Halsey," Hartman recalled years later.

In the 1940s and 1950s, Hall served as the sports anchor for the 10 p.m. news on WCCO radio alongside the news anchor, Cedric Adams. The Adams–Hall news program was exceptionally popular, commanding 70% of the radio audience in the state. According to Sid Hartman, "Airplane pilots would report that, flying over the Minnesota prairie, they could tell when it was 10:30 P.M. That was when the 'CCO news was over and the lights in all the farm houses would go out."

When the Washington Senators moved to Bloomington and became the Minnesota Twins in 1961, Hall was a member of the original WCCO radio broadcast team and WTCN television broadcast team along with Ray Scott and Bob Wolff. When Wolff left in 1962 to cover NBC's national baseball game of the week, Herb Carneal joined the Hall and Scott broadcast team. When Scott left to become the lead NFL announcer for CBS television, Merle Harmon joined the Hall–Carneal broadcast team.

Unlike his radio career with the Millers, Hall broadcast in person Twins road games as well as home games at Metropolitan Stadium. He reveled both in announcing Twins games and in traveling with the team across the country. As Sid Hartman put it, "Halsey was in heaven. He loved baseball, he loved the radio, and he loved the fact he was able to drink for free on the road."

A cigar smoker, Hall accidentally set his sport coat on fire during a 1968 Twins broadcast at Comiskey Park in Chicago. Jerry Zimmerman, the Twins catcher, said afterwards, "Halsey's the only man I know who can turn a sports coat into a blazer." Hall retired from Twins broadcasts after the 1972 season.

== Family ==
In 1922 Hall married Sula Bornman in London, Wisconsin. Sula's brother, a Moravian minister, presided at the wedding ceremony.

The daughter of German immigrants, Sula grew up in Pennsylvania. Her father died when she was four, and her mother died when she was 13. Upon her mother's death, Sula moved to North Dakota to live with her sister, Katie Marcks.

A graduate of Fargo High School and Moorhead Normal School, Sula was a school teacher. She met Halsey in Duluth when she was teaching at Fairmount Elementary School and he was a Navy recruiter. After their marriage, Halsey and Sula lived in the same house on Ramona Avenue (later renamed Alabama Avenue) in St. Louis Park for 55 years, until Halsey Hall's death in 1977.

They had a daughter, Suzanne "Sue" Eugenia Hall, who was born in 1928. She married William "Bill" Charles Kennedy in 1949. They had three children and raised their family on Sunnyside Road in Edina, not far from Halsey and Sula's home.

== Catch phrases ==
Halsey Hall originated the huzzah "Holy cow!" as a home run exclamation on WCCO radio long before Harry Caray and Phil Rizzuto used it. Hall also originated the practice of adding "Golden" before "Gophers" when describing the University of Minnesota's football and basketball teams. Hall was inspired by the golden uniforms the Gopher football team adopted under Coach Bernie Bierman in the 1930s. Golden Gophers is now the official name of the University's athletic teams.

== Death and legacy ==
Halsey Hall died of a heart attack at his home on December 30, 1977. He was buried at Fort Snelling National Cemetery. After his death, he was voted the most popular Minnesota sportscaster of the 1970s. As his biographer Stew Thornley explained, "Halsey Hall was an institution" for Minnesota sports fans. In the words of Minnesota Twins Hall of Famer Harmon Killebrew, Halsey Hall "was the most unforgettable man I ever knew."

Hall was inducted into the Minnesota Sports Hall of Fame in 1989. In 2001 he was inducted into the Minnesota Broadcasting Hall of Fame. The Minnesota chapter of the Society for American Baseball Research is named after Halsey Hall.

Twenty years after Hall's death, Sid Hartman observed that "Halsey Hall was the most beloved character this area has ever had."
