= Ed Lucas =

American sportswriter (1939–2021)

- Lucas with Alex Rodriguez
- Born: Edward Joseph Lucas Jr. January 3, 1939; Jersey City, New Jersey, U.S.
- Died: November 10, 2021 (aged 82); Livingston, New Jersey, U.S.
- Education: Seton Hall University
- Occupation: Sportswriter
- Years active: 1964–2021
- Known for: Sports reporter
- Spouse: Allison Pfeifle
- Children: 2

Edward Joseph Lucas Jr. (January 3, 1939 – November 10, 2021) was an American blind sportswriter who primarily covered the New York Yankees.

== Early life and injury ==
Born in Jersey City, New Jersey, Lucas grew up in Weehawken, New Jersey and attended St. Joseph's School for the Blind in Jersey City. Lucas was blind from 1951, when he was 12 years old. He was pitching in a pickup game on October 3, 1951—the day of Bobby Thomson's "Shot Heard 'Round the World"— when a line drive hit him in the face. The accident resulted in the loss of his sight. From 1964, Lucas was a reporter and broadcaster. He was an alumnus of Seton Hall University, having received a bachelor's degree in communication arts.

== Career ==
Lucas covered the Yankees for over six decades. In 2015, he covered his 60th consecutive Opening Day at Yankee Stadium.

Lucas was featured in Bleacher Boys, a 2009 documentary about blind baseball fans, and in an April 2018 episode of SC Featured on ESPN. He released his memoir, Seeing Home: The Ed Lucas Story: A Blind Broadcaster's Story of Overcoming Life's Greatest Obstacles, in 2015.

== Personal life and death ==
Lucas married his first wife in 1965, and they had two children, Edward and Christopher. His wife left him in 1972.

In 1979, his ex-wife returned seeking custody of their children. On September 25, 1980, Lucas was awarded full and complete custody of his children, becoming the first man in New Jersey to win a custody battle, and the first disabled person in the country to win custody from a non-disabled spouse.

In 2006, Lucas and his second wife, Allison Pfeifle, were the first couple to be married on the field of Yankee Stadium; they had been introduced to each other by Phil Rizzuto.

A resident of Union Township, Union County, New Jersey, Lucas died from pulmonary fibrosis on November 10, 2021, at the age of 82.

== Works ==
- Lucas, Ed; Lucas, Christopher (2015). Seeing Home: The Ed Lucas Story: A Blind Broadcaster's Story of Overcoming Life's Greatest Obstacles. Gallery/Jeter Publishing. ISBN 978-1476785837.
