= Ivana Las Vegas =

Proposed Las Vegas Strip high-rise

- Location within Nevada
- Former names: The Summit

General information
- Status: Never built
- Classification: Residential, commercial
- Location: Las Vegas, Nevada, United States
- Coordinates: 36.143830°N 115.157018°W
- Named for: Ivana Trump
- Estimated completion: December 2008
- Cost: $700 million
- Owner: Rinkai America

Height
- Height: 923 feet (281 m)

Technical details
- Floor count: 73
- Grounds: 2.17 acres (0.88 ha)

Design and construction
- Architecture firm: JMA Architecture Studios
- Developer: Victor Altomare
- Engineer: Nevada By Design
- Main contractor: Turner Construction

The Ivana Las Vegas was a proposed 73-floor, 923-foot condominium high-rise, named after Ivana Trump. The project was initially announced in August 2004, as The Summit, and was to be constructed on the 2.17-acre site of the closed Holy Cow Casino and Brewery, located on the Las Vegas Strip in Las Vegas, Nevada. Trump became involved with the project in June 2005, when it was renamed.

The Ivana Las Vegas was to feature 945 condo units, including a $35 million 20,000 sq ft (1,900 m^{2}) penthouse. The project would have begun construction in summer 2006, with a completion date of December 2008. The property was put up for sale in December 2005, after the project had been cancelled because of rising construction costs. The property later became the site of a two-story Walgreens store.

== History ==
=== The Summit ===
The condominium high-rise project was initially announced as The Summit on August 19, 2004. The project was to be built by a company called Sahara Condominiums, with financing from Australian developers Joseph Di Mauro and Victor Altomare. Altomare had been convinced of Las Vegas' "developer-friendly environment" by Las Vegas mayor Oscar Goodman and city officials. The Summit was to feature 73 floors and stand 940 feet, and was to be built at a cost of $700 million. If built, the Summit would have been the tallest habitable structure in the Las Vegas Valley, and one of the tallest residential towers in the world. Di Mauro said the project would be financed by "internal and external funding," such as revenue from other businesses that he owned.

The Summit was designed by JMA Architecture Studios, and was to feature 960 condo units, with nine different floor plans to be offered. Entry-level units were expected to sell for $600,000 to $700,000. The Summit's lower-floor units would be fully furnished, and would be marketed towards people looking to buy a second home, giving owners the option to also rent out their unit when not in use. The top 16 floors would include 151 units ranging from 1,276 sq ft (118.5 m^{2}) to 11,000 sq ft (1,000 m^{2}). A 15,682 sq ft (1,456.9 m^{2}) penthouse would also be featured, which Sahara Condominiums hoped to sell for over $35 million.

The building was to be constructed on the 2.17 acres (0.88 ha) of land that was then occupied by the closed Holy Cow Casino and Brewery and a small, multi-level parking garage, both located at the northeast corner of South Las Vegas Boulevard and Sahara Avenue on the Las Vegas Strip. Di Mauro and Altomare planned to demolish both structures for the new high-rise. Di Mauro hoped to finish the permit process within three months and begin selling units by late December 2004. The Summit was expected to take approximately three years to complete. Sales offices for The Summit were set up in Asia and Australia to market the project. The project was expected to generate $1 billion in profit. By November 2004, the Summit's height had been reduced to 923 feet. Altomare said that month that the "Summit" name was only a working title, and that he would release a brand name for the project eventually.

The project was approved by the city of Las Vegas in November 2004. The federal government approved the 923-foot project – now with 800 condo units – in January 2005. By the end of the month, Altomare was in discussions with Turner Construction to build the high-rise, which was expected to take two and a half years to finish. Altomare said at that time that the project's construction would be financed by syndicated bank loans underwritten by presales of the condo units, which were expected to begin selling in late April 2005, with starting prices at $600,000. The tower's 11,000 sq ft (1,000 m^{2}) penthouse was priced at $35 million. Altomare believed that many buyers would be from out of state and from foreign countries. Altomare also said the project's official name would be announced after an agreement was made with a well-known, high-profile woman who would be willing to attach her own name and endorse the project.

=== Ivana Las Vegas ===
By June 2005, Ivana Trump, an ex-wife of businessman Donald Trump, had partnered with Altomare on the project, now named The Ivana. At 73 floors, Ivana Trump's condominium tower would have been taller than her ex-husband's planned Trump Hotel Las Vegas. Jack Wishna, a partner in Donald Trump's condo project, was skeptical that Ivana Trump's condo tower would be better: "Donald is a mega-developer who is so much more than just a name on a building. Other projects may use the Ivana name but no one will ever mistake it for a Donald Trump luxury project." Wishna also noted that another Ivana Trump project, located in Florida, also "went down the tubes." At that time, the tower was to begin construction in July 2005.

On the morning of July 12, 2005, while Donald Trump was breaking ground on his condo project, officials for Ivana Trump's condo project – now called Ivana Las Vegas – were preparing an educational sales meeting for real estate agents and brokers later that afternoon. It was believed that the events were purposely scheduled for the same day, although Luke Chadwick, director of sales for Ivana Las Vegas, said the scheduling was merely a coincidence. Approximately 1,500 agents – 500 more than expected – attended the sales meeting for Ivana Las Vegas, held at the Bellagio hotel and casino. Chadwick said about the event, "I've done hundreds of projects, and I've never seen this level of interest before."

Many agents were not impressed by the event, but still believed the project would eventually open, despite industry experts and Donald Trump questioning the likelihood that the project could obtain financing for construction. At that time, the Ivana Las Vegas was to feature 943 units ranging from 500 sq ft (46 m^{2}) to 1,900 sq ft (180 m^{2}), with prices ranging from $800,000 to $1.7 million. On-site amenities would have included a gym, a spa, an ultra lounge, and restaurants. In addition to lending her name to the project, Ivana Trump also planned to assist in designing the interiors.

Ivana Las Vegas' sales launch took place at the Mandalay Bay Convention Center on August 14, 2005. Ivana Trump attended the event, where more than 487 condo units were sold, two of which were purchased by Trump herself. With more than half of the project's planned 945 units now sold, Ivana Las Vegas passed a minimum that was required to qualify for construction financing. Advanced sales generated nearly $500 million, while Chadwick believed that the ultimate number would be over $1 billion, making it the most expensive residential building ever sold. Ivana Trump said at the event that Ivana Las Vegas "is for the person who appreciates privacy and has a certain style." Trump said many of her buyers were entertainers, casino executives, and high rollers "who want privacy."

Trump said she was closely involved with many of the building's aspects, including the approval of floor plans and advertising, and was also currently holding meetings with architects to create color schemes for the project. The event served as the beginning of a national sales campaign that would feature Ivana Trump. Chadwick expected the project to sell its remaining condo units in the next month as marketing and advertising increased. Some local real estate analysts, as well as Donald Trump, criticized the project's viability due to its location on the northern Las Vegas Strip, where little development had occurred in recent years.

It is believed that because of its location, Ivana Las Vegas would have had a tougher time selling if it had not been for Trump's name being attached to the project. Altomare believed that new projects such as the nearby Fontainebleau Resort Las Vegas would help to improve the area. Ivana Trump believed that the project's location was the best in Las Vegas because of flight patterns from McCarran International Airport, which prevented buildings taller than 40 floors from being erected on either side of Ivana Las Vegas. Ivana Trump said, "I will forever dominate the skyline of Las Vegas."

Units on the upper floors cost nearly $2,000 per square foot, which was somewhat higher in comparison to other high-rise projects. Prices for a one-bedroom unit started at $550,000, while the tower's $35 million penthouse was now expected to be 20,000 sq ft (1,900 m^{2}), and would include nine bedrooms, a recording studio, and security measures such as retina scanners. The interiors would include stone and marble finishes. Additional amenities that were announced included a business center, a coffee shop, a pool, and a Zen garden.

The closed Holy Cow Casino served as a temporary sales office for Ivana Las Vegas. The sales office was described as having the appearance of a nightclub, as it contained smoke machines, loud music, and flashing lights. Construction of Ivana Las Vegas, to be handled by Turner Construction, was scheduled to begin in summer 2006 and conclude in December 2008, at a cost of $500 million.

By December 14, 2005, the property had been listed for sale at a cost of $49 million. Sales of the tower's units were suspended, with each of the buyers eligible for a refund. On December 16, 2005, Altomare said rising construction costs were responsible for the decision to put the property up for sale. Altomare also said he had a "very credible buyer" who wanted to add a hotel and casino to the project; the height of the tower would need to be reduced or additional nearby acreage would need to be acquired to accommodate parking for such plans. The property was relisted for sale in May 2007, for $50 million. At that time, Altomare was not interested in a joint venture on the property. The property sold later that year for $47 million, and a two-story Walgreens was being built on the site in 2014.
