= Ted Wragg =

British educationalist and academic

- Born: 26 June 1938; Sheffield, England
- Died: 10 November 2005 (aged 67); Exeter, England
- Education: University of Exeter; University of Leicester; Durham University
- Awards: Elected member of the Academy of Social Sciences
- Scientific career
- Workplaces: University of Exeter; University of Nottingham; Queen Elizabeth Grammar School, Wakefield; Wyggeston Grammar School
- Thesis: An analysis of the verbal classroom interaction between graduate student teachers and children (1972)

Professor Edward Conrad Wragg (26 June 1938 – 10 November 2005) known as Ted Wragg, was a British educationalist and academic known for his advocacy of the cause of education and opposition to political interference in the field.

He was Professor of Education at the University of Exeter from 1978 to 2003, serving as Emeritus Professor of Education from 2003 till his death, and a regular columnist in the Times Educational Supplement and The Guardian.

In the UK, the Ted Wragg Teaching Award for Lifetime Achievement honours his memory, and is given out annually to educators who are considered to have shown excellent devotion to teaching throughout their careers.

== Early career ==
Wragg was born in Sheffield and first attended Hunters Bar Primary School, After doing well in the age 11 exam, he was able to attend what, at the time, was the highest-rated of several grammar schools in the city - King Edward VII School.

This was followed by Hatfield College, Durham University where he obtained a Bachelor of Arts degree in German, awarded with first class honours (his parents were German speakers and he was familiar with the language).

He then taught at Queen Elizabeth Grammar School, Wakefield from 1960 to 1964 when he moved to be Head of German at Wyggeston Boys' School in Leicester. In 1966 he went to the University of Leicester where he obtained a Master of Education degree.

== Academic career ==
His long association with the University of Exeter began in the late 1960s when he went there to lecture on Education, principally the methodology of teaching Modern Languages, and to study for a PhD, which he was awarded in 1972. As Professor of Education at the University of Nottingham from 1973 to 1978, he created the university's Post Graduate Certificate of Education course (he also acted as Specialist Adviser to the House of Commons Select Committee on the attainments of school-leavers in 1976–77).

In 1978 he returned to Exeter as a Professor where he headed the amalgamation of the Exeter Education department with St Luke's College. While at Exeter he directed numerous research projects on such topics as classroom processes, teaching strategies, curriculum evaluation, appraising competence and incompetence, and performance-related pay. He also studied education in numerous countries around the world. Throughout his academic career he would always make time to teach a class of children for one or two days a week so that he would remain in touch with the profession at the 'chalkface'.

== Professional recognition ==
Wragg was president of the British Educational Research Association in 1981–82, Chairman of the Educational Broadcasting Council of the UK from 1981 to 1986.

In 1997 he was invited to deliver the Hockerill Lecture.

He was a member of the board of the Qualifications and Curriculum Authority from 1997 to 2003. He wrote more than 50 books on a wide range of educational topics, as well as producing a 120-book reading scheme, two CD-ROMs, a DVD on teachers' questions, and many videos and audiotapes. Shortly before his death he was elected as an Academician of the Social Sciences.

== Commentary ==
He was a frequent broadcaster on radio and television and wrote regularly in newspapers including the Times Educational Supplement and The Guardian. Wragg was an advocate of warmth, humour and humanity in the classroom and defended these ideals with passion against a narrowly utilitarian approach to learning; he was vociferous in opposing attempts to roll back the education changes of the 1960s. He had a ready and sharp wit, which worked well with his savage indignation at politically inspired educational reforms. Although initially his beliefs were reflected by the government of Tony Blair, he later fell out with it and attacked it, nicknaming Ruth Kelly "Ruth Dalek" and "The Duchess of Drivel"; he also coined the nickname 'Tony Zoffis' (Tony's office) for Andrew Adonis, then a member of the Downing Street policy unit but subsequently ennobled and appointed as Parliamentary Under Secretary of State for Education.

== Bibliography ==
Wragg was a prolific writer. The following list of some of his books is freely adapted from the material posted on his University of Exeter curriculum vitae.

- E C Wragg (1974) Teaching Teaching David and Charles
- E C Wragg, J Oates and P Gump (1976) Classroom Interaction Open University Press
- E C Wragg (1981) Class Management and Control Macmillan
- E C Wragg (1982) Swineshead Revisited Trentham
- E C Wragg (1982) A Review of Research in Teacher Education NFER-Nelson
- E C Wragg (ed) (1984) Classroom Teaching Skills Croom Helm
- E C Wragg (1984 Pearls from Swineshire Trentham
- E C Wragg (1986) Education: An Action Guide for Parents BBC
- E C Wragg (1987) Teacher Appraisal Macmillan
- E C Wragg (1988) The Wragged Edge Trentham
- E C Wragg and J A Partington (1989) Schools and Parents Cassell
- E C Wragg (1990) Riches from Wragg Trentham
- E C Wragg (1991) Mad Curriculum Disease Trentham
- E C Wragg and M Williams (1993) The Parents' File Southgate
- E C Wragg (1993) No, Minister! Trentham
- E C Wragg (1993) Class Management Routledge
- E C Wragg and G Brown (1993) Explaining Routledge
- G Brown and E C Wragg (1993) Questioning Routledge
- E C Wragg (ed) (1993) Education: a Different Vision IPPR
- E C Wragg (1993) Primary Teaching Skills Routledge
- E C Wragg (1994) An Introduction to Classroom Observation Routledge
- R Dunne and E C Wragg (1994) Effective Teaching Routledge
- E C Wragg, F J Wikeley, C M Wragg, G S Haynes (1996) Teacher Appraisal Observed Routledge
- E C Wragg (1994) Flying Boot Nelson
- E C Wragg (1995) The Ted Wragg Guide to Education Butterworth Heinemann
- E C Wragg (1996) The Last Quango Trentham
- E C Wragg (1997) The Cubic Curriculum Routledge
- E C Wragg (1997) Assessment and Learning Routledge
- E C Wragg (1998) The Prince of Darkness Trentham
- E C Wragg, C M Wragg, G S Haynes and R P Chamberlin (1998) Improving Literacy in the Primary School Routledge
- E C Wragg (1999) An Introduction to Classroom Observation (2nd edition) Routledge
- E C Wragg, G S Haynes, C M Wragg and R P Chamberlin (2000)Failing Teachers? Routledge
- E C Wragg (2001) Class Management in the Primary School, Routledge Falmer.
- E C Wragg (2001) Class Management in the Secondary School, Routledge Falmer.
- E C Wragg (2001) Assessment and Learning in the Primary School, Routledge Falmer.
- E C Wragg (2001) Assessment and Learning in the Secondary School, Routledge Falmer.
- E C Wragg and G Brown (2001) Explaining in the Primary School, Routledge Falmer.
- E C Wragg and G Brown (2001) Explaining in the Secondary School, Routledge Falmer.
- E C Wragg and G Brown (2001) Questioning in the Primary School, Routledge Falmer.
- E C Wragg, G Brown (2001) Questioning in the Secondary School, Routledge Falmer.
- E C Wragg, G S Haynes, Wragg, C M and Chamberlin, R P (2004) Performance Pay for Teachers, Routledge Falmer.
- E C Wragg (Ed) (2004) Teaching and Learning, RoutledgeFalmer.
- E C Wragg (Ed) (2005) Letters to the Prime Minister, Central Books.
- E C Wragg (2005) (in press) The Art and Science of Teaching and Learning, Routledge.
- Editor of the international research journal Research Papers in Education (Taylor and Francis) since 1986.
