= Ivana Young Man =

- Presented by: Ivana Trump
- Starring: Ivana Trump; Jeff Lindell; Evan Scott Golden
- Country of origin: United States
- Original language: English

Production
- Executive producers: Anthony Ross; Scott Stone; Sharon Levi
- Running time: 120 minutes

Original release
- Network: Oxygen
- Release: April 29, 2006

Ivana Young Man is a two-hour American reality television program hosted by Ivana Trump, who aids a divorced 40-year-old woman in finding a younger man. The program consists of six men, who are gradually eliminated from the competition by Trump.

The program was announced in September 2004, with its premiere scheduled for that fall on Fox, before being changed to January 2005. The program did not air as scheduled, and Fox later confirmed that it had shelved the project. Oxygen acquired the program from Fox in February 2006, and broadcast it on April 29, 2006.

== Overview ==
Ivana Young Man is hosted by Ivana Trump, who aids 40-year-old Kathy Dahl in finding a younger man. Dahl is a wealthy divorced mother from Minnesota. Trump chooses six men, ages 22 to 32, for Dahl to choose among. Trump also offers her advice to Dahl. The men perform several intellectual and physical challenges over the course of several days, including rock climbing. At the end of each day, after a challenge, one of the men is chosen by Dahl to join her in a hotel room so they can spend time together. The men are gradually eliminated from the competition by Trump, who tells them, "You're not desired." Jeff Lindell, a model, won the competition.

Trump's younger boyfriend, 32-year-old Italian dancer and model Rossano Rubicondi, appears as one of the six men. For the program, he was given the name of Paulo, to keep his identity secretive from the other men. Dahl was made aware of Rubicondi's true identity, and he served as an informant to her regarding the other men.

== Production and broadcast ==
Ivana Young Man was announced in September 2004. Casting had already begun at that time, and the program was initially scheduled to air on Fox later that fall. Scott Stone, Sharon Levy and Anthony Ross were executive producers for the project. Stone devised the idea for the program while going up a ski slope, saying "It was in the zeitgeist, with Demi and Ashton, and Madonna and Guy Ritchie. And I have a lot of female friends always looking for me to help find men for them, but the men their own age are (sometimes) intimidated by their success." Stone then discussed the program with Trump, who enjoyed the idea of hosting it. Stone said, "The reason we went to Ivana for this show is she is the prototype for this type of relationship." Stone also said, "We really matched the guys up with Kathy's interests. We wanted to give her the gamut. We have kind of the all-American hunky quarterback-looking guy. We got the quirky, funny, great-sense-of-humor guy and we got the hot European sexy guy." Thousands of men auditioned to be on the program.

Filming had concluded by November 2004, after seven days of shooting in Manhattan, and the program was scheduled to air on Fox in January 2005, with the potential to become a regular series. However, the program did not premiere on its scheduled air date. In August 2005, Fox confirmed that the project had been shelved with no plans to air it. A reason was not disclosed for the decision. Trump said she did not know why the project was shelved. Stone said that Fox had not definitively ruled out broadcasting the program, but that such a possibility was unlikely. Stone also said that if the program did not air on Fox, "I will do everything in my power to see that it airs somewhere else." Stone further stated that he and Trump were satisfied with the program.

Oxygen acquired the program from Fox in February 2006, and premiered it in the United States on April 29, 2006. Ivana Trump said she did not care about suggestions that she was trying to compete with her ex-husband's reality television series, The Apprentice. Ivana Young Man was not picked up as a full series because of low ratings.

== See also ==
- The Ultimate Merger
