= Lay member of chapter =

Member of Cathedral chapter

Someone who is not ordained but is a member of a Cathedral chapter. The 1999 Church of England Cathedrals measure introduced a requirement for cathedrals to include on their chapters a number of lay people. This varies according to each Cathedral's statutes. Some lay members are appointed by the diocesan bishop while others may be appointed by the cathedral community.

Some lay members of chapter are also appointed canons but this practice is not universal.
