= Mary Hall (actress) =

American actress

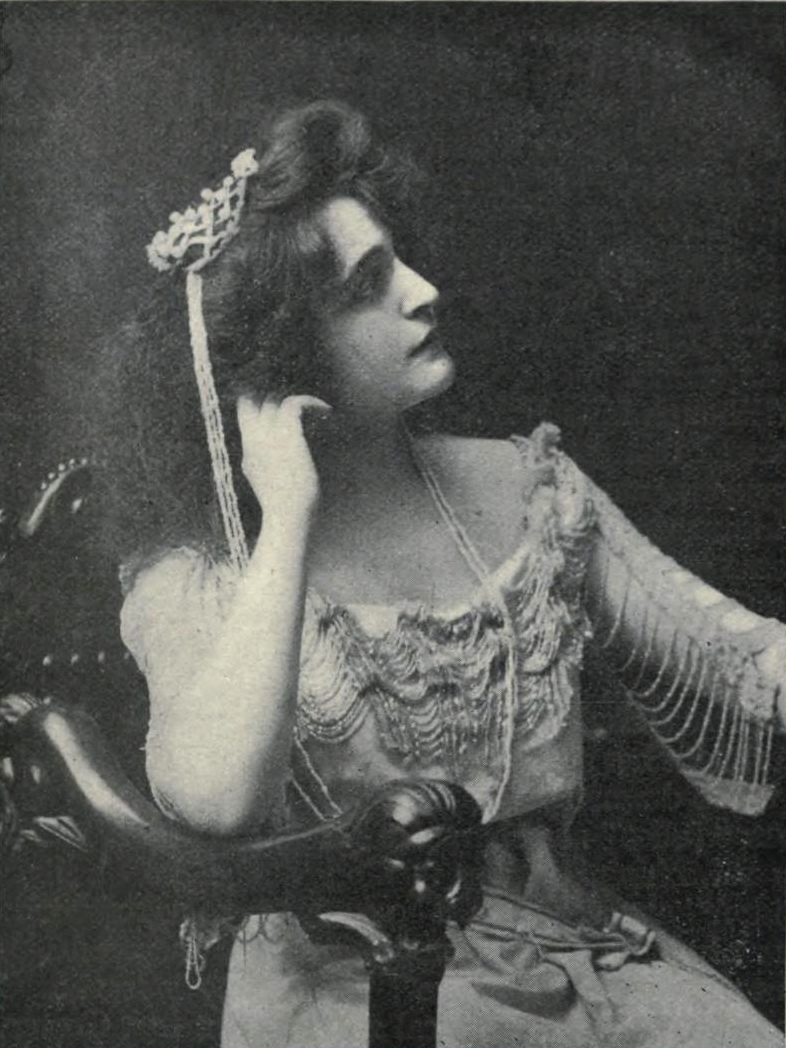
Mary Hall, c. 1903

Mary Hall (born Mary deLuce White, 1877 – December 8, 1960), was an American stage actress who appeared on Broadway from 1897 to 1929. She was part of the Castle Square Theatre in Boston, and a leading lady with Boston's Empire Theatre and the Pike Theatre of Cincinnati. She took her stage name from her first marriage to Smith B. Hall, with whom she was mother of sportscaster Halsey Hall. She died in New York City at age 84.

== Early life and marriages ==
Mary deLuce White was born in Kansas City, Missouri in 1877. She was one of three children born to Henry P. White and Euphemia deLuce. Her father was appointed judge of the criminal court of Jackson County, Missouri in October 1874. He was subsequently elected to that post in successive elections; holding the position until his death in 1892. In the 1890s she performed in amateur productions in Kansas City; including playing the title role in an 1894 production of Arthur Wing Pinero's Sweet Lavender with the Dramatic Club of Kansas City under the direction of Bertha Creighton. She performed with this company again 1895 in an original comedy, My Uncle's Daughter.

On September 25, 1895 Mary married drama critic and Kansas City World editor Smith Bagg Hall at Trinity Episcopal Church in Kansas City. At the time of her marriage she was a prominent woman in Kansas City society. The "statuesque brunette" was nominated queen of the Kansas City flower parade ("Kween Karnation") in 1896; returning for a visit to Missouri after moving with her husband to Minneapolis where he began working just after their marriage. After a short period in Minnesota, the Hall family moved to New York City where Mary gave birth to her son, Halsey Hall, on May 23, 1898. In New York she studied drama with McKee Rankin.

Mary separated from Hall not long after Halsey was born, and they later divorced in 1904 shortly before she married Dr. Charles Tabb Pearce. She had little involvement in Halsey's upbringing and chose her career over inhabiting the role of a mother. She later married newspaperman and theatrical manager William Antisdel (who claimed they were never legally married), actor-manager Frederick E. Bryant, and the unemployment activist Urbain J. Ledoux.

== Career ==
Hall made her professional stage debut in November 1896 in Toledo, Ohio as Barbara Holten in Charles Dazey's In Old Kentucky. She subsequently toured in this show to theaters in Detroit (1896), Buffalo, New York (1896), Washington D.C. (1897), and Brooklyn (1897) before playing the role of Barbara in New York City at the Academy of Music in February 1897. In October 1897 she began performing with the stock theatre company in residence at the Murray Hill Theatre on Broadway; making her debut with that organization as Athenais in a stage adaptation of Georges Ohnet's novel The Ironmaster.

Hall was a member of Helena Modjeska's theatre troupe for its 1899-1900 tour of the United States which began in San Diego in August 1899. Her repertoire with this company included the roles of Princess de La Balle in Marie Antoinette, Ursula in Much Ado About Nothing, and Margaret Kurl in Schiller's Mary Stuart. By January 1900 the tour had reached The Boston Theatre in Massachusetts, and in February 1900 the company performed their shows on Broadway at the Fifth Avenue Theatre which included The Ladies' Battle, Twelfth Night, and Macbeth in addition to the earlier mentioned plays.

After this Hall toured to England with the New York based Arizona Company before coming back to the United States to join the resident company at the Castle Square Theatre in 1902. From here on she was particularly active on stages in New York City and Boston until her retirement in 1929.

== Later life ==
After the death of her husband Urbain J. Ledoux in 1941, Hall moved to Buenos Aires, Argentina where she lived for several years. At some point she moved back to New York. She died on December 8, 1960 in New York City.
