= Ivana Trump =

Czech and American businesswoman and socialite (1949–2022)

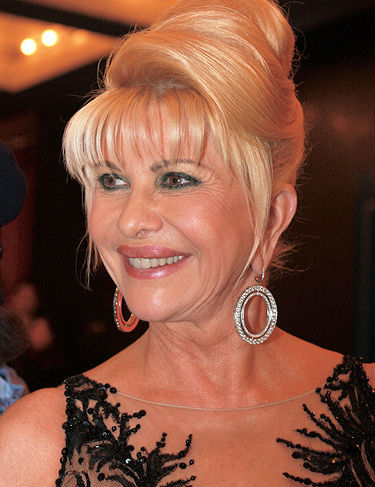
- Trump in 2007
- Born: Ivana Marie Zelníčková; February 20, 1949; Gottwaldov, Czechoslovakia
- Died: July 14, 2022 (aged 73); New York City, U.S.
- Burial place: Trump National Golf Club Bedminster
- Citizenship: Czechoslovakia (until 1993); Czech Republic (from 1993); Austria (from 1973); Canada (from 1978); United States (from 1988)
- Education: Charles University
- Occupations: Businesswoman; socialite; model; designer; author
- Years active: 1970–2022
- Spouses: Alfred Winklmayr (m. 1971; div. 1973); Donald Trump (m. 1977; div. 1990); Riccardo Mazzucchelli (m. 1995; div. 1997); Rossano Rubicondi (m. 2008; div. 2009)
- Partner: Roffredo Gaetani (1997–2005; his death)
- Children: Donald Jr.; Ivanka; Eric
- Parent: Miloš Zelníček (Father) Marie Zelníčková (Mother)

Ivana Marie Trump (née Zelníčková; (Note: Czech pronunciation: [ˈɪvana ˈzɛlɲiːtʃkovaː].) February 20, 1949 – July 14, 2022) was a Czech and American businesswoman, socialite, and model. She lived in Canada in the 1970s, before relocating to the United States and marrying Donald Trump in 1977. She held key managerial positions in the Trump Organization, as vice president of interior design, CEO and president of Trump's Castle casino resort, and manager of the Plaza Hotel.

Ivana and Donald Trump were prominent figures in New York society throughout the 1980s. The couple's divorce, granted in 1990, was the subject of extensive media coverage. (Note: Coverage of the case continued until 1991, when they reached a post-divorce settlement.) Following the divorce, she developed her own lines of clothing, fashion jewelry, and beauty products which were sold on QVC UK and the Home Shopping Network. She wrote an advice column for Globe called "Ask Ivana" from 1995 through 2010, and published several books, including works of fiction, medication, self-help, and the autobiography Raising Trump.

== Early life ==
Ivana Marie Zelníčková was born on February 20, 1949, in Gottwaldov, Czechoslovak Socialist Republic (present-day Zlín, Czech Republic), the daughter of Miloš Zelníček (1927–1990) and Marie Zelníčková (née Francová, b. 1926). She was raised in a Catholic household. Her father was an electrical engineer and her mother worked as a telephone operator. Her father encouraged his daughter's skiing abilities, a practice she began at age four. After developing skills as a skier, Ivana joined the junior national ski team, which offered her opportunities to travel beyond the Soviet-era communist boundaries of what was then the Czechoslovak Socialist Republic. She attended Charles University in Prague and earned a master's degree in physical education in 1972. In 1970, Ivana appeared on Czechoslovak Television in the children's television series Pan Tau.

In 1988, Ivana told journalists she had been selected as a substitute on the Czechoslovak ski team during the 1972 Winter Olympics, specializing in downhill and slalom. However, Czechoslovakia only sent four female athletes to the 1972 Winter Olympics and none were alpine skiers. In 1989, Petr Pomezný, Secretary General of the Czechoslovak Olympic Committee, denied Ivana's claim and stated that despite searching extensively, no record could be found of her involvement. In 2021, Snopes confirmed that Czechoslovakia had not sent female alpine skiers to the 1972 Winter Olympics.

== Emigration to Canada ==
In 1971, Ivana married Alfred Winklmayr, an Austrian ski instructor and her platonic friend, to obtain a passport. The marriage granted her the freedom to leave Czechoslovakia without defection so she could retain the right to return to visit her parents. As Ivana Winklmayr, she received her Austrian passport in March 1972. In August 1973, she obtained an absentee divorce from Alfred Winklmayr in Los Angeles, California, where he had moved to teach skiing.

An (StB) informant with the cover name Lubos reported to his superiors in 1977 how Ivana had begun work at a petrol station in Austria, where she had met her first husband in 1968. She had then emigrated to Canada, where she married Trump.

Ivana was romantically involved with lyricist and playwright Jiří Štaidl, who was killed in a car accident in 1973. After Štaidl's death, Ivana moved to Canada, where she lived with George (Jiří) Syrovátka whom she had dated since 1967; Syrovátka had defected to Canada in 1971 and owned a ski boutique in Montreal. She claimed at the time to be married to Syrovátka, though the two never wed. Ivana worked as a ski instructor while living in Canada. She lived in Montreal for two years, where she continued to improve her English via night courses at McGill University. Working as a model, Ivana told the Montreal Gazette in 1975 that she considered modelling to be a job, rather than a career. Her modelling clients included Eaton's department store and fashion designer Auckie Sanft, along with promotional work for the 1976 Summer Olympics in Montreal.

== Marriage to Donald Trump ==
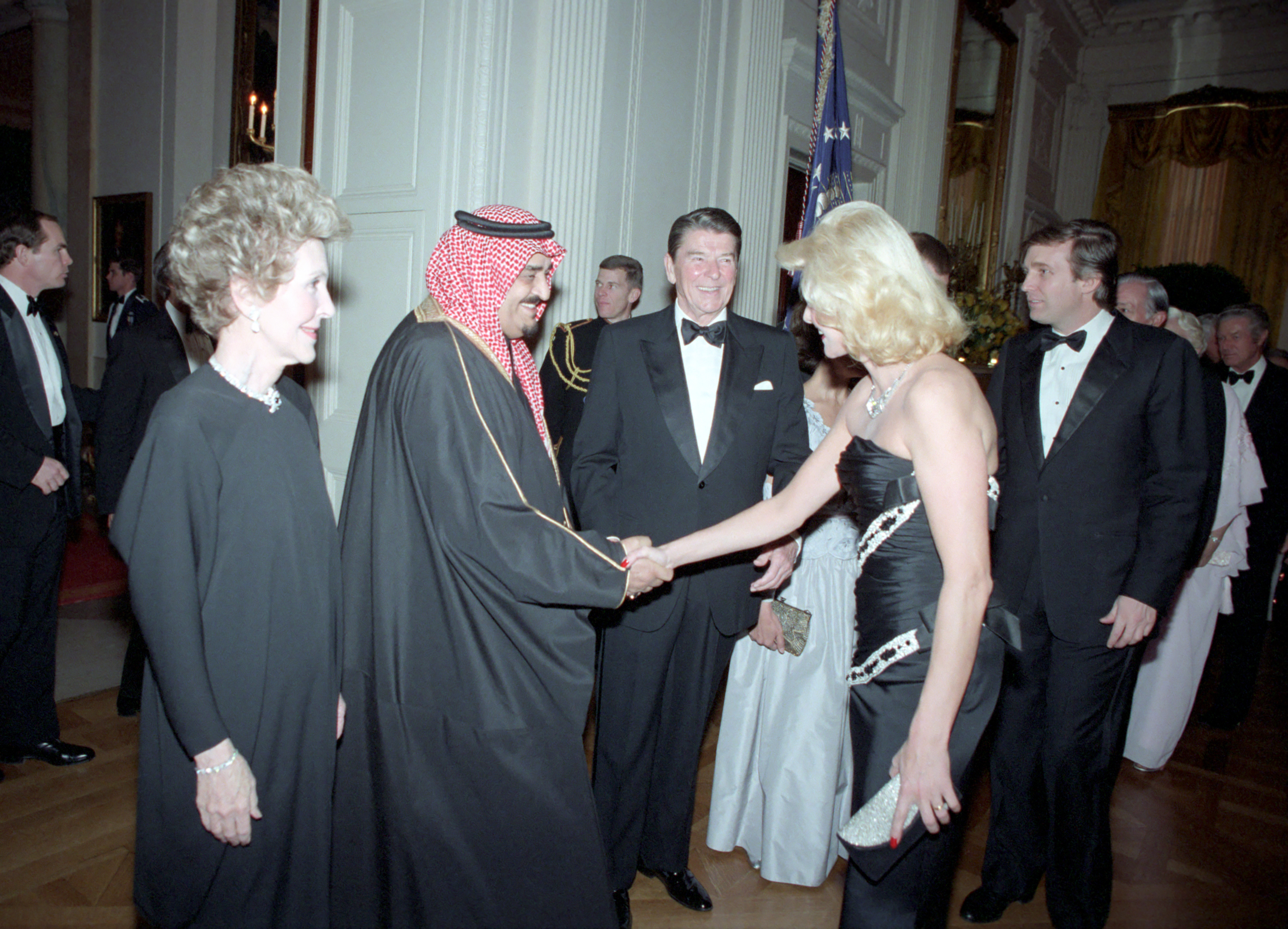
Ivana and Donald Trump in receiving line of state dinner for King Fahd of Saudi Arabia in 1985, with U.S. president Ronald Reagan and First Lady Nancy Reagan

Ivana was in New York City with a group of models in 1976 when she met Donald Trump. On April 9, 1977, the couple married at Marble Collegiate Church in a wedding at which Norman Vincent Peale officiated. They became tabloid figures in New York society during the 1980s and worked together on several large projects, including the Trump Tower on Fifth Avenue in Manhattan, the renovation of the Grand Hyatt Hotel in New York City, and the construction of the Trump Taj Mahal Casino Resort in Atlantic City, New Jersey.

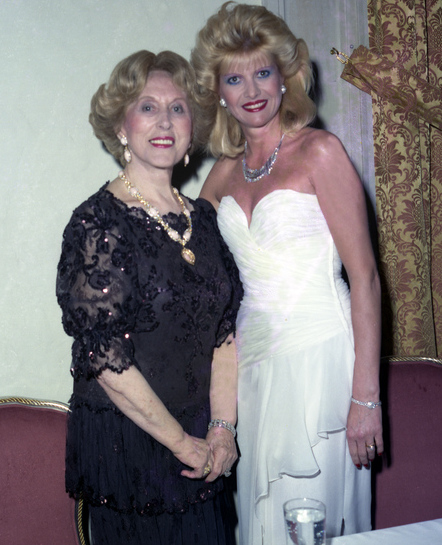
Ivana (on the right) and Estée Lauder at a Red Cross ball in Palm Beach in 1986

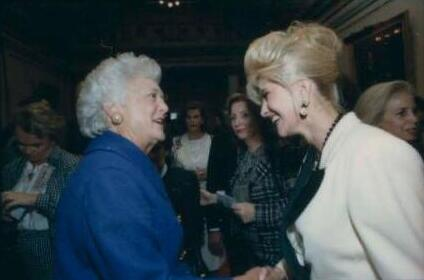
Ivana greeting First Lady Barbara Bush in 1990

During the marriage, Ivana and Donald had three children: Donald Jr. (born 1977), Ivana (Ivanka) Marie (born 1981), and Eric (born 1984). Donald Jr. learned to speak fluent Czech (with the help of his maternal grandfather), while Ivanka gained only a basic understanding of Czech, and Eric was not exposed to his mother's native language since his grandparents were by then comfortable using English.

A reviewer of the 2018 Netflix documentary miniseries on Donald, Trump: An American Dream, described Ivana as "a charismatic workaholic, a career woman, an equal", and a life partner deliberately chosen by Trump to "work beside him and challenge him".

The Trumps' troubled marriage became the subject of public interest over the Christmas holidays in 1989, when they were seen fighting after Ivana encountered Donald's mistress, Marla Maples. The Chicago Tribune reported that by February 1990, Donald had locked Ivana out of her office at the Plaza Hotel, and a legal battle ensued over the legitimacy of the four prenuptial agreements the pair had successively negotiated over the years.

In October 1990, Ivana's 63-year-old father, Miloš Zelníček, died suddenly from a heart attack. According to The Guardian, her father was an informer for Czechoslovakia's Státní bezpečnost (StB) intelligence service who relayed information from his daughter, including a correct prediction that George H. W. Bush would win the 1988 presidential election. Despite their marital troubles and pending divorce, Donald stood at her side at her father's funeral in Zlín held in November 1990.

The Trumps' divorce proceedings received worldwide publicity. Front-page coverage appeared in New York tabloid newspapers for 11 days in a row, and the story was the subject of gossip columnist Liz Smith's entire news coverage for three months. In a deposition relating to their divorce, Ivana accused Donald of rape. In Harry Hurt's book Lost Tycoon: The Many Lives of Donald J. Trump, she confirmed that she had "felt violated". However, in a statement provided by Donald and his lawyers, she said that she had used the word rape, but she did not "want [her] words to be interpreted in a literal or criminal sense". The uncontested divorce was granted in December 1990 on the grounds of cruel and inhumane treatment by Donald. Ivana had to sign a non-disclosure agreement as a condition of the divorce settlement, and she was required to seek Donald's permission before publicly discussing their marriage. The New York Times reported in 1991 that Ivana's divorce settlement included $14 million, a 45-room Connecticut mansion, an apartment in the Trump Plaza, and the use of Mar-a-Lago for one month a year.

== Career ==
During her marriage to Donald, Ivana took on major roles in The Trump Organization, working as a senior executive for seven years, including executive vice president for interior design. She led the interior design of Trump Tower with its signature pink marble. Ivana was appointed CEO and president of the Trump Castle Hotel and Casino in Atlantic City, later becoming the manager of the Plaza Hotel in Manhattan. When Donald Trump won in 2016, she turned down his offer to become the ambassador to her native Czech Republic.

=== Business ventures ===
Soon after the divorce, Ivana developed lines of clothing, fashion jewelry, and beauty products, which were sold through television shopping channels, including the Home Shopping Network and QVC London. In 1995, she presided over The House of Ivana, a fashion and fragrance company with a showroom located on Park Avenue in New York City.

In 1998, Ivana pursued business interests in Croatia (a vacation destination her parents frequently visited), which included the purchase of 33% of the nation's second-largest daily newspaper, Polo+10.

The Ivana-branded Bentley Bay development in Miami, Florida, filed for bankruptcy in 2004. The following year, she was involved in several proposed condominium projects, including the never-built Ivana Las Vegas.

In 2010, Ivana sued Finnish fashion company Ivana Helsinki, accusing it of selling women's clothing that incorporated her name without permission.

=== Writing ===
Ivana wrote several books, including For Love Alone (1992), Free to Love, (1993) and a self-help book called The Best Is Yet to Come: Coping with Divorce and Enjoying Life Again (1995). She wrote an advice column about love and life for Globe, titled "Ask Ivana", from June 1995 through January 2010.

In February 1999, Ivana launched her own lifestyle magazine titled Ivana's Living in Style. She contributed an advice column for Divorce Magazine in 2001.

Ivana released an autobiography, Raising Trump, in 2017. It covered her own upbringing and the early years of raising her children with Donald.

== Media appearances ==
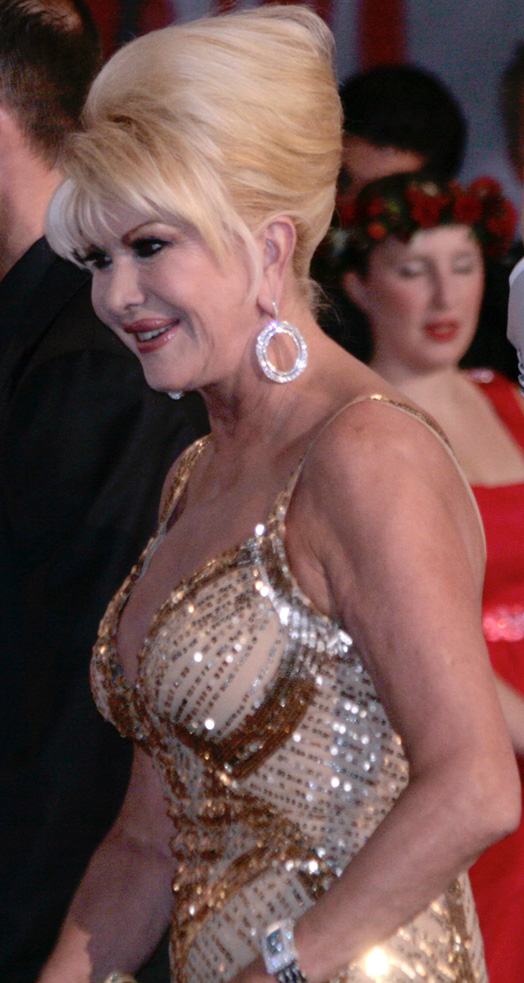
Trump at the Life Ball 2009 in Vienna

Ivana and Donald made several appearances together on television programs including The Oprah Winfrey Show in April 1988, followed by the BBC's Wogan in May 1988. After her divorce from Donald, Ivana was interviewed by Barbara Walters for ABC's 20/20. In 1991, Donald cut off her alimony payments after the interview and announced his intention to sue Ivana for monetary damages. She returned to The Oprah Winfrey Show in 1992 with the message, "I will not let men dominate me anymore."

Ivana Trump had a cameo role in the Hollywood film The First Wives Club (1996) with the line, "Ladies, you have to be strong and independent. And remember: don't get mad, get everything." She was the host of a reality TV special titled Ivana Young Man, which aired on Oxygen Network in 2006. In the reality dating program, she helped a wealthy, middle-aged woman find a younger partner. In 2010, Ivana appeared in the UK television series Celebrity Big Brother 7 where she placed seventh.

== Personal life ==
Ivana was married four times. Her first marriage, to Alfred Winklmayr, was for the goal of securing Austrian nationality.

Ivana was married to Donald Trump from 1977 to 1990, and they had three children, Donald Jr. in 1977, Ivanka in 1981, and Eric in 1984. She became a naturalized United States citizen in 1988.

Ivana married Italian entrepreneur and international businessman Riccardo Mazzucchelli in November 1995. They divorced in 1997. That same year, she filed a $15 million breach-of-contract suit against Mazzucchelli for violating the confidentiality clause in their prenuptial agreement, while Mazzucchelli sued Ivana and her ex-husband Donald in a British court for libel. The suit was later settled on undisclosed terms.

In mid-1997, Ivana began dating Italian aristocrat Count Roffredo Gaetani dell'Aquila d'Aragona Lovatelli. Their relationship continued until his death in 2005.

Ivana dated Italian actor and model Rossano Rubicondi for six years before they married on April 12, 2008. Rubicondi, 36, was 23 years younger than Ivana at the age of 59. The couple's $3 million wedding for 400 guests was hosted by ex-husband Donald at Mar-a-Lago with daughter Ivanka as her maid of honor. The wedding was officiated by Ivana's ex-sister-in-law, Judge Maryanne Trump Barry. Although Ivana and Rubicondi divorced less than a year later, their on-again, off-again relationship continued until 2019, when Ivana announced they had once again "called it quits". Rubicondi died on October 29, 2021, at the age of 49, reportedly from melanoma.

Ivana had 10 grandchildren. In the late 2010s she reportedly split her time between New York City, Miami, and Saint-Tropez. She stated she was fluent in Czech, English, German, French, and Russian.

=== Security inquiries ===
On February 14, 1989, Federal Bureau of Investigation (FBI) headquarters in Washington, DC, recommended a preliminary inquiry into Ivana's connections to Czechoslovakia based on information from a confidential source. The inquiry was initiated by the FBI New York Field Office the following week and is reported to have spanned at least two years. In March 2023, it was revealed that Ivana had been investigated by the FBI's counterintelligence division into allegations connected to her native Czechoslovakia.

The StB spied on Ivana in the 1970s and 1980s when she visited her father, Miloš Zelníček.

== Death ==
On July 14, 2022, Ivana died at age 73 of blunt impact injuries to the torso after falling down steep spiraling stairs at her home on the Upper East Side of Manhattan. Her ex-husband, Donald Trump, and their three children, along with a number of politicians and celebrities, posted condolences on social media. Her funeral was held on July 20 at the Church of St. Vincent Ferrer, a Catholic church near her home. Ivana is buried at the Trump National Golf Club Bedminster in Bedminster, New Jersey.

Ivana left behind an estate worth $34 million. The majority of her assets were willed equally to Donald Jr., Ivanka, and Eric. Other beneficiaries include personal friend Evelyne Galet and the family's former nanny, Dorothy Curry.

== Films and television ==
- For Love Alone: The Ivana Trump Story (TV Movie 1996).
- Ivana portrayed herself in a cameo for The First Wives Club (1996).
- Ivana was portrayed by Katheryn Winnick in the 2005 television film Trump Unauthorized.
- Ivana was played by Maria Bakalova in the film The Apprentice.

== Written works ==
Title	Year	Publisher	ISBN / ASIN
For Love Alone	1992	Pocket Books	ISBN 978-0671790882
Free to Love	1993	Atria	ISBN 978-0671743710
The Best Is Yet to Come: Coping with Divorce and Enjoying Life Again	1995	Pocket Books	ISBN 978-0671865696
Raising Trump: Family Values from America's First Mother	2017	Gallery Books	ISBN 978-1501177293

== Awards and honors ==
- Czech Republic: Ivana was posthumously awarded the Medal of Merit by President of the Czech Republic Miloš Zeman on October 28, 2022.
