= Phil Rizzuto =

American baseball player (1917–2007)

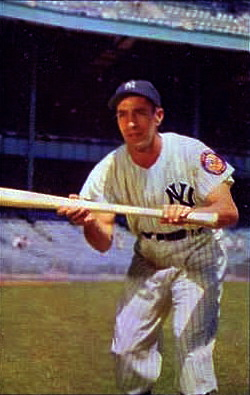
- Shortstop
- Born: September 25, 1917; Brooklyn, New York, U.S.
- Died: August 13, 2007 (aged 89); West Orange, New Jersey, U.S.
- Batted: Right Threw: Right

MLB debut
- April 14, 1941, for the New York Yankees

Last MLB appearance
- August 16, 1956, for the New York Yankees

MLB statistics
- Batting average: .273
- Home runs: 38
- Runs batted in: 563
- Stats at Baseball Reference

Teams
- New York Yankees (1941–1942, 1946–1956)

Career highlights and awards
- 5× All-Star (1942, 1950–1953); 7× World Series champion (1941, 1947, 1949–1953); AL MVP (1950); New York Yankees No. 10 retired; Monument Park honoree

Member of the National

Baseball Hall of Fame
- Induction: 1994
- Election method: Veterans Committee

Philip Francis Rizzuto (/rɪˈzuːtoʊ/ riz-OO-toh; September 25, 1917 – August 13, 2007), nicknamed "the Scooter", was an American Major League Baseball (MLB) shortstop. He spent his entire 13-year baseball career with the New York Yankees (1941–1956), and was elected to the National Baseball Hall of Fame in 1994.

A popular figure on a team dynasty that captured 10 AL titles and seven World Championships in his 13 seasons, Rizzuto holds numerous World Series records for shortstops. His best statistical season was 1950, when he was named the American League's Most Valuable Player. Generally, Rizzuto was a "small ball" player, noted for his strong defense in the infield and as a great bunter. When he retired, his 1,217 career double plays ranked second in major league history, trailing only Luke Appling's total of 1,424, and his .968 career fielding average trailed only Lou Boudreau's mark of .973 among AL shortstops.

After his playing career, Rizzuto had a 40-year career as a radio and television sports announcer for the Yankees. He was a skilled play-by-play announcer who is best known for his idiosyncratic, conversational broadcast style, and for his trademark expression "holy cow!"

== Early years ==
Fiore Rizzuto was born on September 25, 1917, in Brooklyn, New York, the son of a streetcar motorman and his wife, both of whom were originally from Calabria, Italy. There has been confusion about his year of birth, stemming from Rizzuto's "shaving a year off" the date at the beginning of his pro career, on the advice of teammates. Throughout his career, his birth year was reported as 1918 in The Sporting News, the Baseball Register, and the American League Red Book; later reference sources revised the year to 1917, indicating his age at the time of his death to be 89. After Rizzuto's death, the New York Post broke a story that inaccurately reported Rizzuto's year of birth as 1916. However, it was subsequently reported that the New York City Department of Health said Rizzuto's official birth certificate is dated 1917.

Rizzuto grew up in Glendale, Queens. Despite his modest size — usually listed during his playing career as five feet, six inches tall and either 150 or 160 pounds, though he rarely reached even the lower figure — Rizzuto played baseball as well as football at Richmond Hill High School in Queens.

== Professional career ==
=== Minor leagues ===
After playing with the minor league Bassett Furnituremakers for the 1937 season, Rizzuto signed with the New York Yankees as an amateur free agent. His nickname, at times attributed to Yankees broadcaster Mel Allen, was actually bestowed on Rizzuto (according to him) by minor league teammate Billy Hitchcock because of the way Rizzuto ran the bases.

=== New York Yankees (1941–1942, 1946–1956) ===
After receiving The Sporting News Minor League Player of the Year Award in 1940 while playing with the Kansas City Blues, he played his first major league game on April 14, 1941. Taking over for the well-liked Frank Crosetti, whose batting average had dropped to .194 after several strong seasons, Rizzuto quickly fit into the Yankees lineup to form an outstanding middle infield with second baseman Joe Gordon. In his syndicated column on October 1, Grantland Rice compared the pair favorably to the middle infield of the crosstown Brooklyn Dodgers: "Billy Herman and Pee Wee Reese around the highly important keystone spot don't measure up, over a season anyway, with Joe Gordon and Phil Rizzuto, a pair of light-footed, quick-handed operatives who can turn seeming base hits into double plays often enough to save many a close scrap."

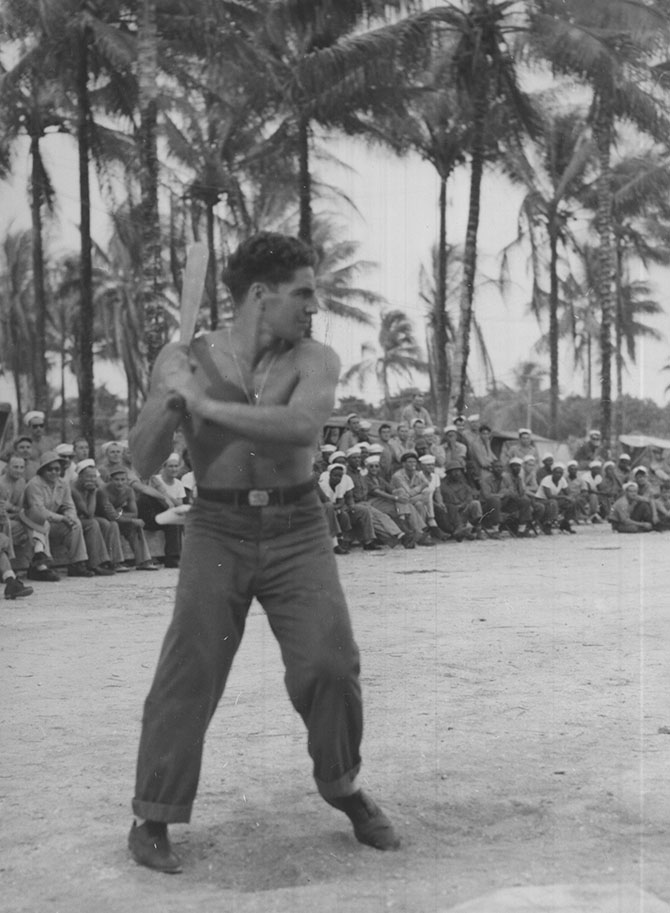
Rizzuto at bat in front of a group of sailors in the South Pacific during his time in the US Navy between 1943 and 1945

Rizzuto ended his rookie season playing in the 1941 World Series, and though he hit poorly, the Yankees beat the Dodgers. In the following year's World Series, Rizzuto led all hitters with a batting average of .381 and 8 hits. The light-hitting shortstop also contributed a home run, despite hitting just four in the regular season.

Like many players of the era, he found his career interrupted by a stint in the military, serving in the United States Navy during World War II. From 1943 through 1945, he played on a Navy baseball team alongside Dodgers shortstop Reese; the team was managed by Yankees catcher Bill Dickey.

Shortly after Rizzuto's return to the Yankees for the 1946 season, he attracted the ire of new Yankees general manager, president, and co-owner Larry MacPhail, former president and general manager of the Brooklyn Dodgers. MacPhail had served in both World Wars, was hard-drinking, tempestuous, and often paranoid, but as a baseball executive was innovative and considered a near-genius despite being hobbled by alcohol and a volatile temper. In 1946 MacPhail became aware that Mexican millionaire and ball club owner Jorge Pasquel, just named president of the Mexican League and who with his wealthy two brothers had poached American players from the Negro leagues since 1943, was now courting Major League players. Several clubs lost players with others mentioned including the Yankees, and Phil Rizzuto was rumored to be considering a $100,000, 3-year contract. For that matter, a number of players on various teams had begun "moonlighting" in winter playing for Cuban teams. The disarray had to end. Baseball Commissioner Albert Happy Chandler, former Kentucky governor, announced on Opening Day that exclusivity clauses still ruled—all contract-jumping players heading to Mexico or Cuba would be suspended from the Major Leagues for 5 years.

The New York Herald Tribune sent one of its star sportswriters, Rutherford "Rud" Rennie, down to Mexico to see what was up with the invigorated Mexican League and the ambitious Pasquel Brothers. By that time they had hired a trio of Mariachi musicians wearing sombreros to play outside at least one American stadium. The Trib's Rennie sent several dispatches from Mexico, liking some things about the scene but disliking others. Rennie, who had covered the Yankees since the Roaring Twenties, was soon astounded when MacPhail sued the Mexican Baseball League and the restraining order named Rud Rennie as an "agent" of the foreigners. Court papers alleged that he had "been seen" in the Yankees locker room talking with his good friend Phil Rizzuto and other players and advocating contract-jumping. Hours later, the Dodgers and Giants owners hastened into court also; their teams were among the 10 who had actually lost a combined number of 23 players that season. The situation was hardly helped when retired Yankees slugger-hero Babe Ruth took his family on an extended Mexican vacation as guest of the Pasquels, and new rumors flew that Ruth was being wooed for a Mexican club manager's job. The lawsuits soon moved to the US Supreme Court, but the Yankees' MacPhail saw he had overreacted in pushing a restraining order on Rennie for merely covering the news and maintaining good relationships with Rizzuto and teammates; the order was dropped, avoiding a potential first amendment fracas for Larry MacPhail, who would be edged out in a year. Perhaps at least partially caused by the court action and negative attention, the Yankees finished third in 1946 and Rizzuto's average went down to .257. By 1947, Commissioner Chandler let Americans return to their home clubs with no penalty. And In 1947 the increasingly valued Rizzuto recorded a .969 fielding average, breaking Crosetti's 1939 team record for shortstops of .968. He broke his own record the following year with a .973 mark.

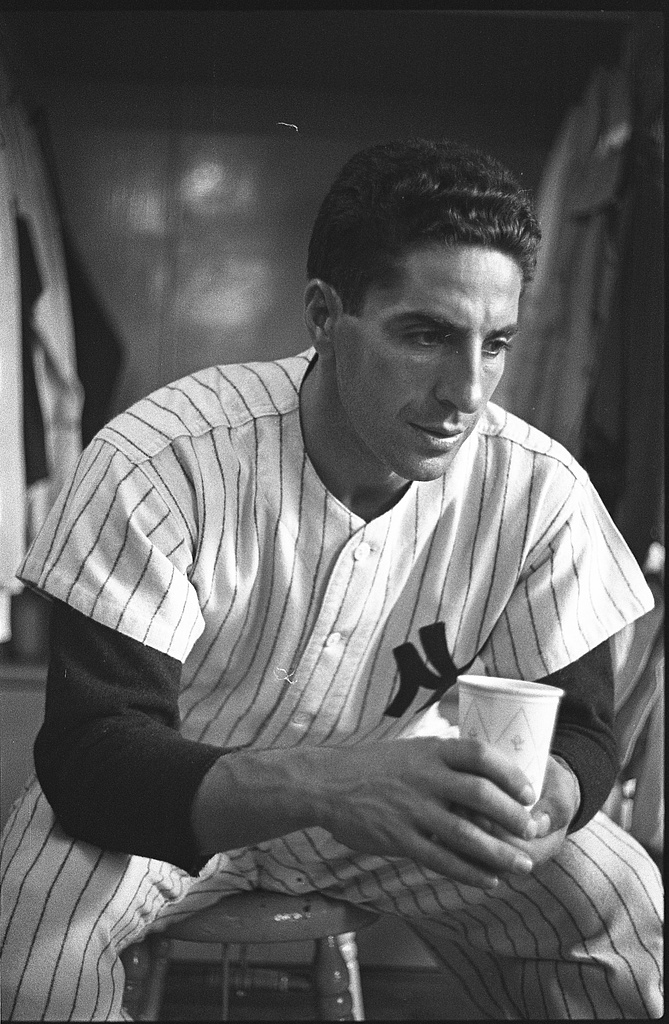
Rizzuto in 1949, the first of five consecutive championship seasons. That season, he led the Yankees in games (153), hits (169), runs scored (110), doubles (22), and stolen bases (18).

Rizzuto's peak as a player was 1949–50, when he was moved into the leadoff spot. In 1950, his MVP season, he hit .324 with 200 hits and 92 walks, and scored 125 runs. While leading the league in fielding percentage, Rizzuto handled 238 consecutive chances without an error, setting the single-season record for shortstops.

From September 18, 1949, through June 7, 1950, he played 58 games at shortstop without an error, breaking the AL record of 46 set by Eddie Joost in 1947–48; the record stood until Ed Brinkman played error-free for 72 games in 1972. Rizzuto recorded 123 double plays in 1950, three more than Crosetti's total from 1938; it remains the Yankee record. Rizzuto's 1950 fielding percentage of .9817 led the league, and came within less than a point of Lou Boudreau's league record of .9824, set in 1947. Rizzuto's mark was a franchise record until 1976, when Yankees shortstop Fred Stanley posted a mark of .983.

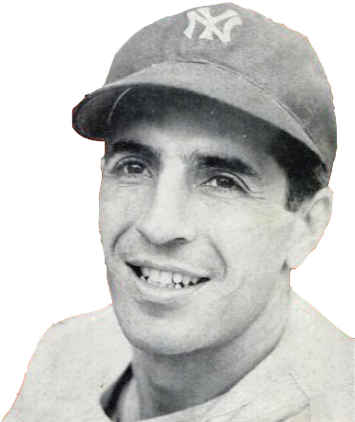
Rizzuto in 1950, the year he was named the American League's Most Valuable Player.

Rizzuto was voted the American League's Most Valuable Player by a large margin in 1950, after having been the runner-up for the award behind Ted Williams in 1949. He became the only MVP in history who led the league in sacrifice bunts. Rizzuto played in five All-Star Games, in 1942 and each year from 1950 to 1953. In 1950, he also won the Hickok Belt, awarded to the top professional athlete of the year, and was named Major League Player of the Year by The Sporting News. He was voted top major league shortstop by The Sporting News four consecutive years (1949–52).

Rizzuto batted .320 in the 1951 World Series, for which the New York chapter of the BBWAA later voted him the Babe Ruth Award as the Series' top player. Decades later, Rizzuto still spoke resentfully of the incident in which pugnacious New York Giants second baseman Eddie Stanky sparked a rally by kicking the ball out of Rizzuto's glove on a tag play. Ty Cobb named Rizzuto and Stan Musial as "two of the few modern ball players who could hold their own among old timers." Yankees manager Casey Stengel had famously dismissed Rizzuto during that Brooklyn Dodgers tryout in 1935 when Stengel was managing that team, advising him to "go get a shoeshine box". But Stengel ended up managing Rizzuto during five consecutive championship seasons, and would later say, "He is the greatest shortstop I have ever seen in my entire baseball career, and I have watched some beauties." During his heyday, Yankees pitcher Vic Raschi noted, "My best pitch is anything the batter grounds, lines or pops in the direction of Rizzuto." Decades into his retirement, teammate Joe DiMaggio characterized Rizzuto's enduring appeal to fans: "People loved watching me play baseball. Scooter, they just loved."

Rizzuto was noted for "small ball", strong defense, and clutch hitting, which helped the Yankees win seven World Series. As an offensive player, he is particularly regarded as one of the best bunters of his era; he led the AL in sacrifice hits every season from 1949 to 1952. In retirement, he often tutored players on the bunt during spring training. In the announcing booth, Rizzuto talked about the several different kinds of bunts he would use in different situations. Later during his broadcasting career, he occasionally expressed disappointment that the art of bunting had largely been lost in baseball. Rizzuto was among the AL's top five players in stolen bases seven times. Defensively, he led the league three times each in double plays and total chances per game, twice each in fielding and putouts, and once in assists. Rizzuto ranks among the top ten players in several World Series categories, including games, hits, walks, runs, and steals, and set a record with 21 consecutive errorless games at shortstop. Three times during his career, the Yankees played until Game Seven of the World Series; Rizzuto batted .455 in those three games (1947, 1952, 1955).

In Rizzuto's obituary, The New York Times recalled a play that had occurred on September 17, 1951, with the Yankees and Cleveland Indians tied for first place and just 12 games left in the season:

Rizzuto was at bat (he was righthanded) against Bob Lemon of the Cleveland Indians. It was the bottom of the ninth inning, in the middle of a pennant chase. The score was tied at 1. DiMaggio was on third base. Rizzuto took Lemon's first pitch, a called strike, and argued the call with the umpire. That gave him time to grab his bat from both ends, the sign to DiMaggio that a squeeze play was on for the next pitch. But DiMaggio broke early, surprising Rizzuto. Lemon, seeing what was happening, threw high, to avoid a bunt, aiming behind Rizzuto. But with Joltin' Joe bearing down on him, Rizzuto got his bat up in time to lay down a bunt. "If I didn't bunt, the pitch would've hit me right in the head", Rizzuto said. "I bunted it with both feet off the ground, but I got it off toward first base." DiMaggio scored the winning run. Stengel called it "the greatest play I ever saw".

As the winning run scored, Lemon angrily threw both the ball and his pitching glove into the stands.

Rizzuto was released by the Yankees on August 25, 1956. Rizzuto often talked about the unusual circumstances of his release. Late in the 1956 season, the Yankees re-acquired Enos Slaughter, who had been with the team in 1954–55, and asked Rizzuto to meet with the front office to discuss adjustments to the upcoming postseason roster. They then asked Rizzuto to look over the list of Yankee players and suggest which ones might be cut to make room for Slaughter. For each name Rizzuto mentioned, a reason was given as to why that player needed to be kept. Finally, Rizzuto realized that the expendable name was his own. He called former teammate George Stirnweiss, who told him to refrain from "blasting" the Yankees because it might cost him a non-playing job later. Rizzuto said many times that following Stirnweiss' advice was probably the best move he ever made.

When he retired, his 1,217 career double plays ranked second in major league history, trailing only Luke Appling's total of 1,424, and his .968 career fielding average trailed only Lou Boudreau's mark of .973 among AL shortstops. He also ranked fifth in AL history in games at shortstop (1,647), eighth in putouts (3,219) and total chances (8,148), and ninth in assists (4,666).

At the time of his last game, he had also appeared in the most World Series games ever (52), a record soon surpassed by five of his Yankees teammates. Rizzuto still holds numerous World Series records for shortstops, including the most career games played, singles, walks, times on base, stolen bases, at-bats, putouts, assists and double plays.

== Personal life ==
Rizzuto married Cora Anne Essenborn on June 23, 1943; the two first met the previous year when Rizzuto substituted for Joe DiMaggio as a speaker at a Newark communion breakfast. "I fell in love so hard I didn't go home", Rizzuto recalled. He rented a nearby hotel room for a month to be near her. The Rizzutos moved to Hillside, New Jersey, in 1949, to an apartment in Monroe Gardens. With later financial successes, they moved to a Tudor home on Westminster Avenue, where they lived for many years.

At a charity event in New Jersey in 1951, Rizzuto met a young boy named Ed Lucas, who had lost his sight when he was struck by a baseball between the eyes on the same day as Bobby Thomson's "Shot Heard 'Round the World". Rizzuto took an interest in the boy and his school, St. Joseph's School for the Blind. Until his death, Rizzuto raised millions for St. Joseph's by donating profits from his commercials and books, and also by hosting the Annual Phil Rizzuto Celebrity Golf Classic and "Scooter" Awards. Rizzuto and Lucas remained friendly, and it was through the Yankee broadcaster's influence that Lucas's 2006 wedding was the only one ever conducted at Yankee Stadium. Lucas was one of Rizzuto's last visitors at his nursing home, days before his death.

Rizzuto was terrified of snakes. Knowing this, opposing players would sometimes play practical jokes on him by inserting rubber snakes into his baseball glove. Whenever this happened, Rizzuto refused to go near the glove until someone assured him the snake was artificial.

== Broadcasting career ==
Rizzuto had options following his release by the Yankees, including a player contract from the Cardinals and a minor league offer from the Dodgers. Rizzuto instead decided to pursue broadcasting after receiving good reviews when he filled in for the New York Giants' wraparound host Frankie Frisch in September 1956 following Frisch's heart attack. Rizzuto submitted an audition tape to the Baltimore Orioles. The Yankees' sponsor, Ballantine Beer, took notice, and insisted that the team hire Rizzuto as an announcer for the 1957 season. General manager George Weiss was obliged to fire Jim Woods, who had only been with the Yankees for four years, to make room for Rizzuto in the booth. When Weiss told Woods he was out in favor of Rizzuto, he said that it was the first time he had to fire someone for no reason.

Rizzuto broadcast Yankee games on radio and television for the next 40 years. His popular catchphrase was "Holy cow." Rizzuto also became known for saying "Unbelievable!" or "Did you see that?" to describe a great play, and would call somebody a "huckleberry" if he did something Rizzuto did not like. During game broadcasts, he would frequently wish listeners a happy birthday or anniversary, send get-well wishes to fans in hospitals, and speak well of restaurants he liked, or of the cannoli he ate between innings. This chatter sometimes distracted the speaker himself; Rizzuto devised the unique scoring notation "WW" for his scorecard; it stood for "Wasn't Watching".

He also joked about leaving the game early, saying to his wife, "I'll be home soon, Cora!" and "I gotta get over that bridge", referring to the nearby and often-congested George Washington Bridge, which he would use to get back to his home in Hillside. In later years, Rizzuto would announce the first six innings of Yankee games; the TV director would sometimes puckishly show a shot of the bridge (which can be seen from the top of Yankee Stadium) after Rizzuto had departed. Rizzuto was also very phobic about lightning, and sometimes left the booth following violent thunderclaps.

Rizzuto started his broadcasting career working alongside Mel Allen and Red Barber in 1957. Among a number of announcers that Rizzuto worked with over the course of his career, Frank Messer (1968–1985) and Bill White (1971–1988) were the two most memorable. Rizzuto, Messer, and White were the main broadcast trio that presided over an important time period for the Yankees, which spanned from the non-winning CBS years through the championship seasons and other years of struggle during the Steinbrenner era. On television, for example, the Yankees broadcast team went unchanged from 1972 to 1982.

Rizzuto was twice assigned to broadcast the World Series while with the Yankees. He worked the 1964 series on NBC-TV and radio with Joe Garagiola when the Yankees faced the Cardinals. The next time the Yankees made it into the series, in 1976, Rizzuto joined Garagiola and Tony Kubek on NBC-TV when the Yankees faced the Reds. The 1976 World Series was the last to have a local voice from each of the two teams take part as guest announcers. The usual Rizzuto-Messer-White broadcast trifecta of the Yankees carried the ALCS on radio and TV in 1976, 1977, 1978, 1980, and 1981 (plus a 1981 Division Series), providing New York City metropolitan area fans a local alternative to the national broadcasts. Fran Healy, a recently retired player, was added to the radio broadcasts in 1978.

Rizzuto would typically refer to his broadcast partners by their last names, calling them "White", "Murcer" and "Seaver" instead of "Bill", "Bobby" or "Tom". Reportedly, he did the same with teammates during his playing days. Rizzuto developed a reputation as a "homer", an announcer who would sometimes lapse into openly rooting for the home team. In 1978, on the televised postgame show, the news arrived that Pope Paul VI had just died. "Well," said Rizzuto, "that kind of puts the damper on even a Yankee win." Esquire magazine called that the "Holiest Cow of 1978".

Rizzuto's most significant moments as a broadcaster included the new single-season home run record set by Roger Maris on October 1, 1961, which he called on WCBS radio:

Here's the windup, fastball, hit deep to right, this could be it! Way back there! Holy cow, he did it! Sixty-one for Maris! And look at the fight for that ball out there! Holy cow, what a shot! Another standing ovation for Maris, and they're still fighting for that ball out there, climbing over each other's backs. One of the greatest sights I've ever seen here at Yankee Stadium!

Rizzuto also called the pennant-winning home run hit by Chris Chambliss in the American League Championship Series on October 14, 1976, on WPIX-TV:

He hits one deep to right-center! That ball is out of here! The Yankees win the pennant! Holy cow, Chris Chambliss on one swing! And the Yankees win the American League pennant. Unbelievable, what a finish! As dramatic a finish as you'd ever want to see! With all that delay, we told you Littell had to be a little upset. And holy cow, Chambliss hits one over the fence, he is being mobbed by the fans, and this field will never be the same, but the Yankees have won it in the bottom of the 9th, 7 to 6!

Rizzuto was also on the microphone for the one-game playoff that decided the dramatic 1978 AL East race between the Yankees and the Boston Red Sox, the Pine Tar game involving George Brett in 1983, and Phil Niekro's 300th career win in 1985.

On August 15, 1995, the evening of the funeral of former teammate Mickey Mantle, the Yankees were set to play a road game against the Boston Red Sox. Announcing partner Bobby Murcer had already left to attend the funeral. Rizzuto was not permitted to leave, as the team needed someone to do the color commentary. Rizzuto abruptly left the booth after five innings, saying he could not go on. Rizzuto announced his retirement from announcing soon afterwards, which was attributed to the incident.

He was eventually persuaded to return for one more season in 1996, where he called another Yankee shortstop protégé, Derek Jeter's first home run. He retired for good at the end of the season. Apart from military service, he had spent the first 60 years of his adult life in the Yankee organization as a minor league player (1937–1940), major league player (1941–1942, 1946–1956) and broadcaster (1957–1996). Although Allen has long been known as the "Voice of the Yankees," Rizzuto is the longest serving broadcaster in Yankees history, serving 40 years to Allen's 30 years over two stints.

== Other media appearances ==
On February 2, 1950, Rizzuto was the first mystery guest on the 1950–67 Goodson-Todman Productions game show What's My Line? hosted by John Charles Daly. Rizzuto made four more appearances on the program, three as a guest panelist in the 1956–1957 season following his retirement, and one in 1970 as the Mystery Guest on a later incarnation of the quiz show. Rizzuto also made various television appearances on programs such as CBS's The Ed Sullivan Show, To Tell The Truth and The Phil Silvers Show.

Alongside his broadcasts for the Yankees, Rizzuto hosted It's Sports Time with Phil Rizzuto, a 5-minute weekday evening sports show, on the CBS Radio Network from 1957 to 1977.

Rizzuto was the longtime celebrity spokesman in TV ads for The Money Store. He was well known as their spokesman for nearly 20 years, from the 1970s into the 1990s.

Rizzuto provides play-by-play commentary during the long spoken bridge in Meat Loaf's 1977 song "Paradise by the Dashboard Light". Ostensibly an account of a baseball sequence, it actually describes the singer's step-by-step efforts to engage in coitus with a young woman (voiced by actress and singer Ellen Foley). When Rizzuto recorded his piece, he was reportedly unaware of how his spoken contribution would be used. When the song broke, Rizzuto said his parish priest called him in shock. However, "Phil was no dummy", said singer Meat Loaf. "He knew exactly what was going on, and he told me such. He was just getting some heat from a priest and felt like he had to do something. I totally understood." Years later, Rizzuto would laughingly retell the story saying he got snookered by Meat Loaf, but he had a good attitude about it and when Meat Loaf asked him to go on tour with him, Rizzuto was flattered but declined, jokingly saying that Cora would "kill him" if he did. Rizzuto was given a gold record for the album.

== Honors ==
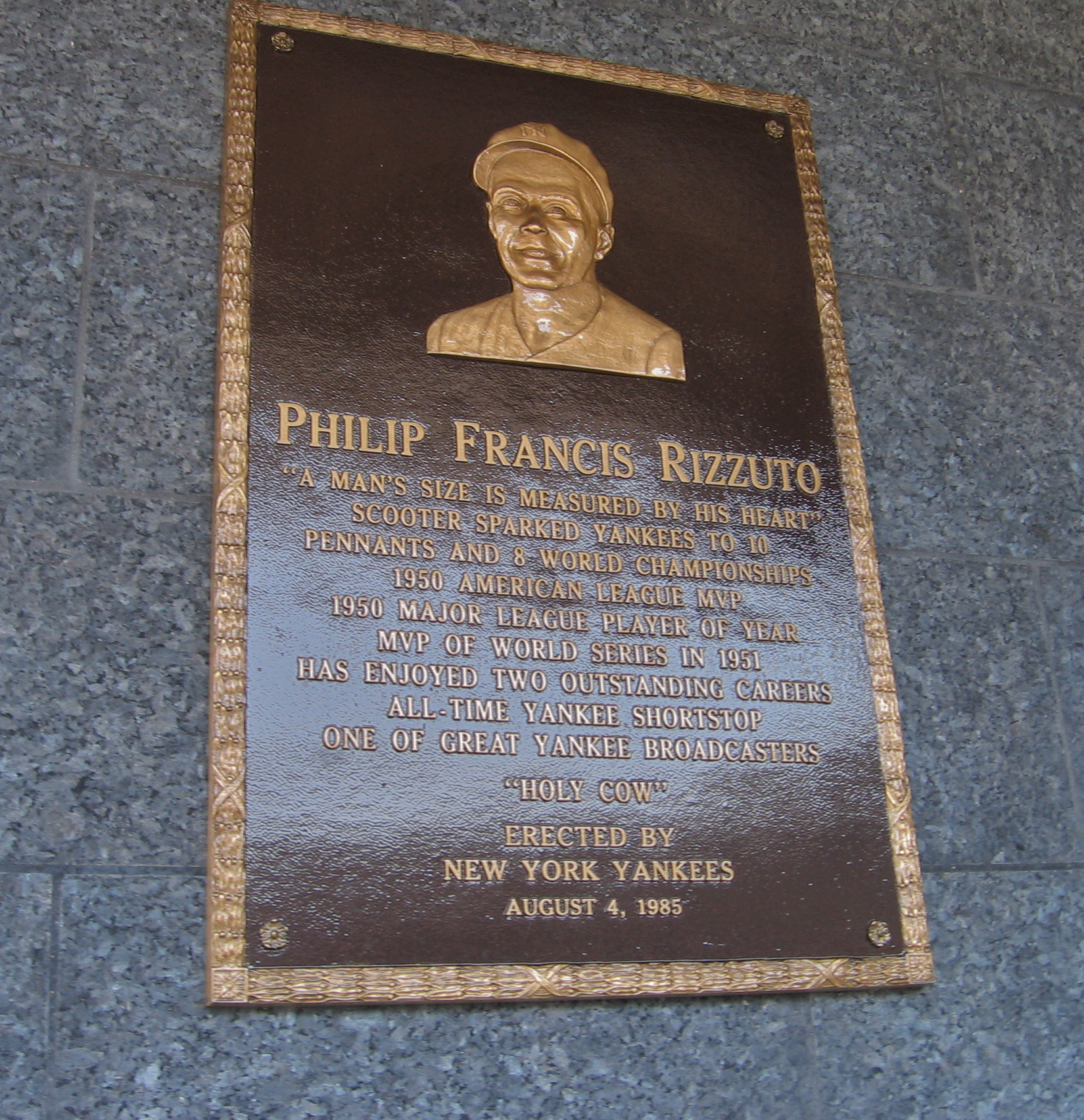
Rizzuto's plaque in Monument Park

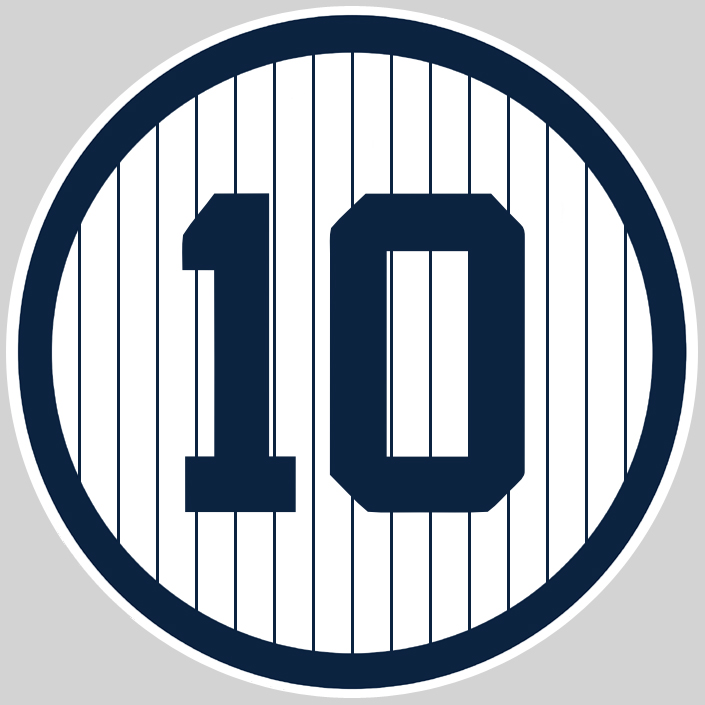
Phil Rizzuto's number 10 was retired by the New York Yankees in 1985.

The Yankees retired Rizzuto's number 10 in a ceremony at Yankee Stadium on August 4, 1985. During this ceremony, he was also given a plaque to be placed in the stadium's Monument Park. The plaque makes reference to the fact that he "has enjoyed two outstanding careers, all-time Yankee shortstop, one of the great Yankee broadcasters". Humorously, Rizzuto was accidentally bumped to the ground during his own ceremony, by a live cow wearing a halo (that is, a "holy cow"); both honoree and cow were unhurt. Rizzuto later described the encounter: "That big thing stepped right on my shoe and pushed me backwards, like a karate move." In that day's game, future broadcast partner Tom Seaver recorded his 300th career victory.

Most baseball observers, including Rizzuto himself, came to believe that Derek Jeter had surpassed him as the greatest shortstop in Yankees history. The Scooter paid tribute to his heir apparent during the 2001 postseason at Yankee Stadium; jogging back to the Yankee dugout, he flipped the ceremonial baseball backhand, imitating Jeter's celebrated game-saving throw to home plate that had just occurred during the Yankees' 2001 American League Division Series triumph. ESPN reported that the photo of Jeter and Rizzuto taken that evening is one of Jeter's most prized possessions.

In the spring of 1957, following Rizzuto's release, Baltimore Orioles manager Paul Richards said, "Among those shortstops whom I have had the good fortune to see in action, it's got to be Rizzuto on top for career achievement. For a five-year period, I would have to take Lou Boudreau. ... But, year after year, season after season, Rizzuto was a standout." Sportswriter Dan Daniel wrote at the time, "It seems to me that Rizzuto must be included among the few players of the past five years who may look forward to ultimate election to the Hall of Fame." However, Daniel's assessment did not come to pass for over 35 years.

Rizzuto was elected to the Hall of Fame along with Leo Durocher (who was selected posthumously), in 1994 by the Veterans Committee, following a long campaign for Rizzuto's election by Yankee fans who were frustrated that he had not received the honor. Some of Rizzuto's peers supported his candidacy, including Boston's Ted Williams. Williams once claimed that his Red Sox would have won most of the Yankees' 1940s and 1950s pennants if they had had Rizzuto at shortstop, but Rizzuto himself was more modest: "My stats don't shout. They kind of whisper." The push for Rizzuto became especially acute after 1984, when the committee elected Pee Wee Reese, the similarly regarded shortstop of the crosstown Brooklyn Dodgers.

Bill James later used Rizzuto's long candidacy as a recurring focus in his book Whatever Happened to the Hall of Fame?, devoting several chapters to the shortstop's career and comparisons with similar players. James assessed Rizzuto's career statistics as historically substandard by Hall of Fame standards, although he acknowledged that credit must be given for the years he missed in World War II, and criticized many of the public arguments both for and against his selection; but despite noting that Rizzuto was a great defensive player and a good hitter he stated that he could not endorse his candidacy, as there were too many similar players with virtually identical accomplishments. The book's final paragraph noted Rizzuto's election to the Hall in February 1994. James, however, did point out that there were numerous players in the Hall who were inferior to Rizzuto, and in 2001 he selected Rizzuto as the 16th greatest shortstop of all time, ahead of eight other Hall of Famers.

Rizzuto was modest about his achievements, saying, "I never thought I deserved to be in the Hall of Fame. The Hall of Fame is for the big guys, pitchers with 100 mph fastballs and hitters who sock homers and drive in a lot of runs. That's the way it always has been, and the way it should be."

Rizzuto gave a memorably discombobulated induction speech at Cooperstown, in which he repeatedly complained about the buzzing flies that were pestering him. Rizzuto's "inimitable and wondrous digressions and ramblings" were mimicked by New York Times columnist Ira Berkow:

Anyway, somewhere in the speech (Rizzuto) told about leaving home in Brooklyn for the first time when he was 19 years old and going to play shortstop in the minor league town of Bassett, Virginia, and he was on a train with no sleeper and when he got his first taste of Southern fried chicken and it was great and it was also the first time that he ever ate -- "Hey, White, what's that stuff that looks like oatmeal?"—and Bill White, his onetime announcing partner on Yankee broadcasts, and, like all his partners, never seemed to learn their first names, though he knew the first and last names of a lot of the birthdays he forever is announcing and the owners of his favorite restaurants even though as he admits he often talks about the score or the game, but after 38 years of announcing games and after a 13-year playing career with championship Yankee teams few seem to care about this either, well, White was in the audience and stood up and said "Grits".

In 1999, the minor league Staten Island Yankees named their mascot "Scooter the Holy Cow", after Rizzuto. He was inducted in 2009 into the New Jersey Hall of Fame. There is a park named after him in Elizabeth, New Jersey, directly across from Kean University.

In 2013, the Bob Feller Act of Valor Award honored Rizzuto as one of 37 Baseball Hall of Fame members for his service in the United States Navy during World War II.

== Death ==
When Rizzuto did not attend the annual Cooperstown reunion in 2005 and the annual New York Yankees Old Timers Day in 2006, questions were raised about his health. His last public appearance came early in 2006; visibly frail, he announced that he was putting much of his memorabilia on the market. In September 2006, Rizzuto's 1950 MVP plaque fetched $175,000, three of his World Series rings sold for $84,825, and a Yankee cap with a wad of chewing gum on it went for $8,190. The majority of the proceeds went to Rizzuto's longtime charity of choice, Jersey City's St. Joseph's School for the Blind.

On September 12, 2006, the New York Post revealed that Rizzuto was currently in a "private rehab facility, trying to overcome muscle atrophy and problems with his esophagus". During his last extensive interview, on WFAN radio in late 2005, Rizzuto revealed that he had an operation where much of his stomach was removed and that he was being treated with medical steroids, a subject he joked about in light of baseball's performance-enhancing drugs scandal.

Rizzuto died in his sleep on August 13, 2007, three days short of the 51st anniversary of his last game as a Yankee, exactly twelve years after the death of Mickey Mantle, and just over a month shy of his 90th birthday. He had been in declining health for several years and was living at a nursing home in West Orange, New Jersey for the last months of his life. At the time of his death, at age 89, Rizzuto was the oldest living member of Baseball's Hall of Fame.

Rizzuto was survived by his wife, Cora (who died in 2010), daughters Cindy Rizzuto, Patricia Rizzuto and Penny Rizzuto Yetto, son Phil Rizzuto Jr., and two granddaughters.

== See also ==
- List of Major League Baseball players who spent their entire career with one franchise
