= Fred Trump (disambiguation) =

Fred Trump (1905–1999) was an American real-estate developer and the father of US president Donald Trump.

Fred or Frederick Trump may also refer to:

- Frederick Trump (1869–1918), German-American businessman, the father of Fred Trump
- Fred Trump Jr. (1938–1981) American airplane pilot, son of Fred Trump
- Fred Trump III (born 1962), American author, grandson of Fred Trump
- Fred Trump (politician) (1913–1968), Arizona businessman and political candidate

== See also ==
- Trump (surname)
- Trump family
