= Horace B. Griffen =

American baseball player, businessman, and politician (1894–1972)

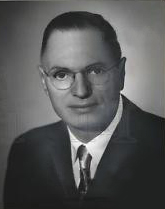
- Griffen c. 1956

Personal details
- Born: Horace Bigelow Griffen, Jr. December 28, 1894 Hillsboro, Kansas, U.S.
- Died: August 22, 1972 (aged 77) Mesa, Arizona, U.S.
- Party: Republican
- Spouse: Jessie Dickinson (m. 1919)
- Children: 2
- Occupation: Newspaper businessman; Baseball player

Horace Bigelow Griffen Jr. (December 28, 1894 – August 22, 1972) was an American baseball player, newspaper businessman, and politician.

== Biography ==
=== Early life, baseball and military service ===
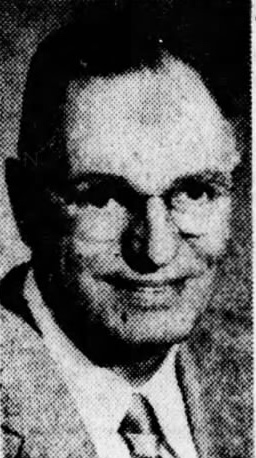
An early professional photograph of Griffen (c 1914), taken as his official journalism portrait for his job at the Arizona Republic

He was born in Hillsboro, Kansas to Horace Bigelow Griffen, Sr., a mail carrier and his wife. His family moved to Tempe, Arizona during his infancy.

Griffen attended Tempe Normal School, which later became Arizona State University, where he played baseball for the school as an outfielder in 1912 and as first baseman in 1913 and 1914. In 1914, he was also the head coach of the school baseball team, coaching them to a 6–5 record. That same year, he was signed by the Milwaukee Brewers of the American Association before being called up as a professional baseball player on the Chicago White Sox for two months, describing his time there as having "warmed the bench". Despite not playing in any professional games, he was noted as having been an "ASU legend" for being "the first player from the school to sign a contract with a major league club".

Shortly after graduating from college, he joined the military in World War I. during which he served for three years in the Quartermaster Corps. Griffen was "one of the first to volunteer for service from the Salt River valley". He joined the First Engineers and "went overseas with the first contingent of American troops", deploying in France. He served throughout American involvement in the war, and was promoted to corporal in 1917, and to sergeant in 1918. He wrote regular correspondences from the war, which were published at home, noting that he had seen a matchbox taken as a trophy inscribed "Got Mitt Uns 1916-17", and quipping that "[a]pparently the German, too, realizes that God, if he ever was with them, left them in 1918". He noted in the same piece that he had "seen war in all its horrors", but that there was "a spirit of desire to make amends for all the wrongs the enemy has done".

=== Career and political activities ===
Griffen worked for nearly 50 years in the advertising and circulation department of The Arizona Republic, a daily newspaper published in Phoenix, beginning in 1914. During this time, he served three stints as president of the Arizona State University Alumni Council, and also served as district governor of the Rotary Clubs of Arizona.

Republican Party leaders seeking a candidate for governor in the 1956 Arizona gubernatorial election recruited Griffen because, as one observed, "He knows everybody in the state". Griffen sought the nomination, beating O.D. Miller and Fred Trump in the Republican primary. The San Francisco Examiner wrote of his primary race that Griffen was "an amateur who ran like a veteran in a rough, three way fight". However, he lost the general election to incumbent Democratic governor Ernest McFarland, by a vote of 171,848 votes to 116,744, which was at the time "the biggest margin for any state or national candidate in Arizona history". Griffen retired from the newspaper business in 1964. In the Spring of 1967, Griffen led a contingent of Arizona Rotarians on a tour of southern Africa, meeting with Rhodesian Prime Minister Ian Smith, with whom Griffen was impressed. Also in 1967, Griffen partnered with artist Adolfo Guerrero in establishing the Arizona Decorating Company, "shouldering a major portion of the management burden".

== Endorsements ==
Eugene C. Pulliam, the maternal grandfather of Dan Quayle and owner of the Republic and The Gazette, paid tribute to Griffen by saying.

He was one of the grandest men of the Republic and Gazette family. He had been a newspaperman all his life and he was one of the best. I doubt if any newspaperman with the possible exception of Ben Avery knew as many people as Horace did. You just don't fill the shoes of a man like Horace Griffen. Everybody who knew him loved him and he will certainly be missed by the entire Republic and Gazette organization.

== Personal life and death ==
On October 14, 1919, Griffen married Jessie Dickenson of Tempe, with whom he had one son, Horace Bigelow Griffen III, and one daughter, Eunice Clare Griffen. Griffen's son, Horace Bigelow Griffen III, died in Yuma, Arizona in 2017 at the age of 96.

Griffen died on August 22, 1972, at the Country Club Nursing Home in Mesa, Arizona.

Party political offices
| Preceded by John Howard Pyle | Republican nominee for Governor of Arizona; 1956 | Succeeded by Paul Fannin |
