= Fred Trump =

American real estate developer (1905–1999)

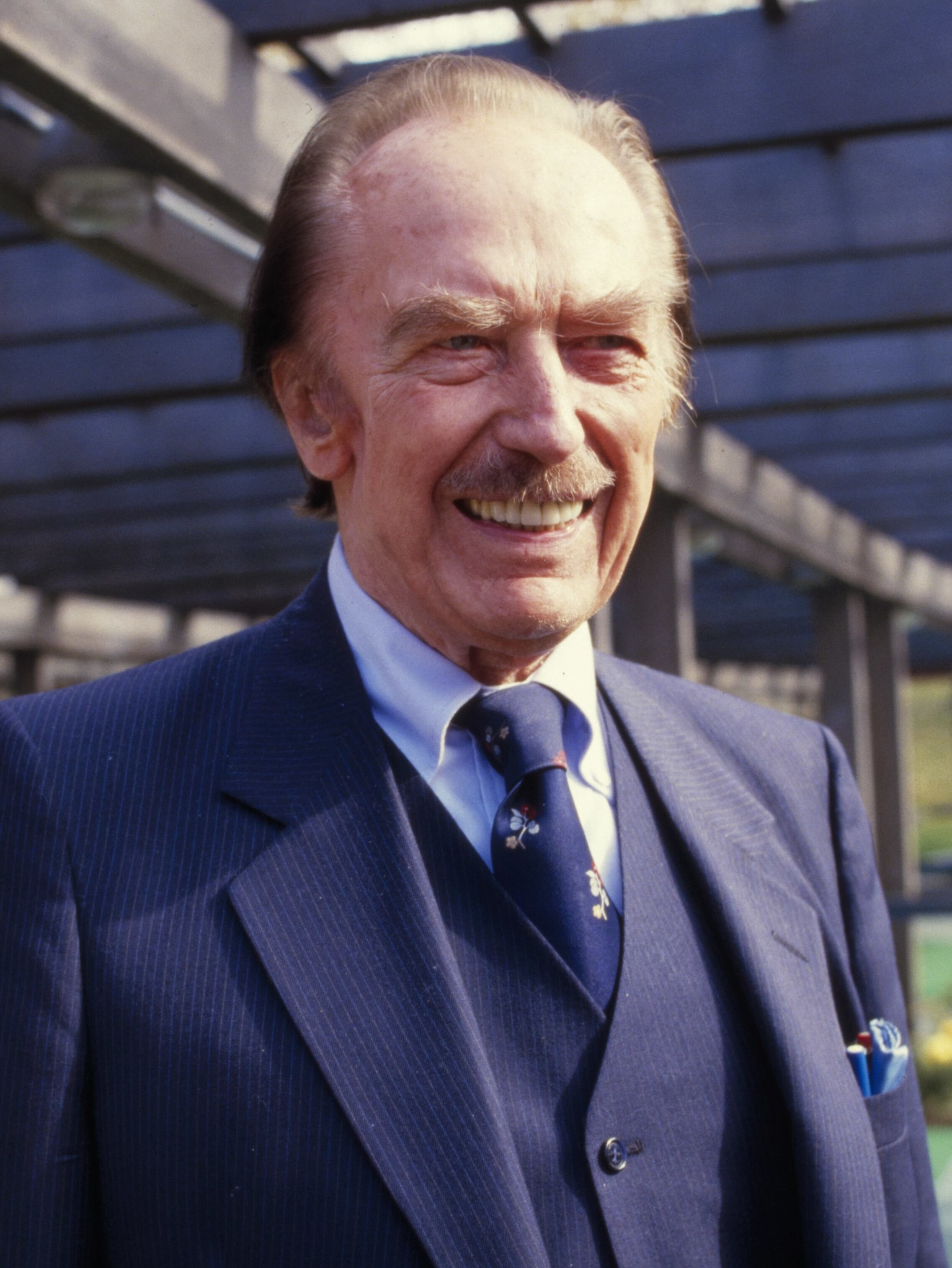
- Trump in 1986
- Born: Frederick Christ Trump; October 11, 1905; New York City, U.S.
- Died: June 25, 1999 (aged 93); New York City, U.S.
- Burial place: Lutheran All Faiths Cemetery, Queens
- Education: Pratt Institute
- Occupations: Businessman; real estate developer
- Political party: Republican
- Other political affiliations: New York State Democratic Party
- Spouse: Mary Anne MacLeod (m. 1936)
- Children: Maryanne; Fred Jr.; Elizabeth; Donald; Robert
- Parent(s): Frederick Trump; Elizabeth Christ Trump
- Family: Trump family
- Awards: Horatio Alger Award

Frederick Christ Trump (Note: Middle name pronounced /krɪst/, rhyming with fist.) (October 11, 1905 – June 25, 1999) was an American real estate developer and businessman. He was the father of Donald Trump, the 45th and 47th president of the United States, along with four other children.

Trump was born in the Bronx, New York City, to a German immigrant couple. He began working in home construction and sales in the 1920s before heading the real-estate business started by his parents (later known as the Trump Organization). (Note: Previously, it had no single name but had been called the Fred (C.) Trump Organization and operated subsidiaries such as Trump Management and Trump Construction Corp.) He first built houses in Queens, expanding to build apartments for World War II workers on the East Coast. Trump reportedly built more than 27,000 low-income apartments and row houses in the New York area altogether. He was investigated for profiteering by a U.S. Senate committee in 1954 and again by New York State in 1966. Donald Trump became the president of his father's business in 1971. Two years later, they were sued by the U.S. Justice Department's Civil Rights Division for racial discrimination against Black people.

According to The New York Times, Fred and his wife, Mary, provided over $1 billion (in 2018 dollar value) to their children, avoiding over $500 million in gift taxes. In 1992, Fred and Donald set up a subsidiary which was used to funnel Fred's fortune to his progeny. Shortly before his death, Fred transferred the ownership of most of his buildings to his surviving children, who several years later sold them for over 16 times their previously declared worth.

Although Trump was arrested at a Ku Klux Klan demonstration in 1927, there is no conclusive evidence that he supported the organization. (Note: In September 2015, Boing Boing reproduced the New York Times article about Fred's 1927 arrest specifying his address. Donald confirmed the address to the Times, but when asked about the 1927 story denied that his father had ever lived there or been arrested, claiming that it was not the same person.) From World War II onward, Trump denied his German ancestry to avoid associations with Nazism and also supported Jewish causes. (Note: Trump styled a toothbrush mustache by 1950, about when it fell out of fashion due to associations with Adolf Hitler.) (Note: Several fraternity brothers at the historically Jewish Sigma Alpha Mu claimed that fellow member Fred Trump Jr. said his father was Jewish. In 2018, psychoanalyst Justin A. Frank asserted that Fred Jr. joined such a fraternity to rebel against his father, whom Frank alleges was anti-Semitic. Fred Jr.'s daughter, Mary L. Trump, later also claimed her grandfather was "quite anti-Semitic".) (Note: As U.S. president, Donald falsely claimed several times that his father was from Germany. While speaking about the German Chancellor, Donald reportedly said, "I was raised by the biggest kraut of them all," invoking an ethnic slur for a German, particularly a soldier of World War I or II.)

== Early life and career ==
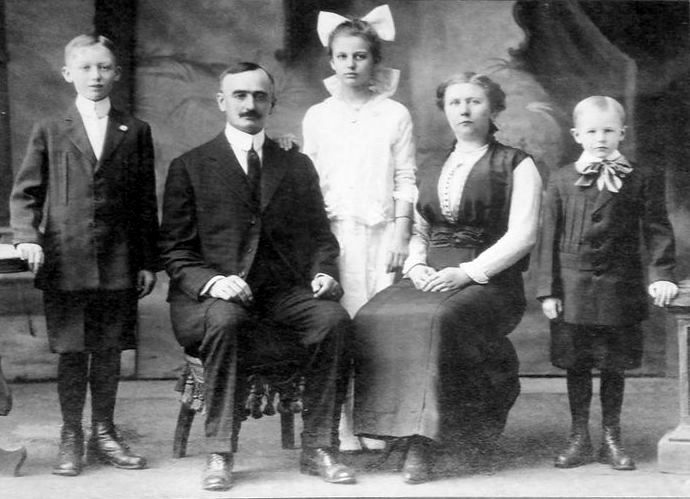
Fred Trump (far left) with his family, c. 1915

Trump's father, the German-born Frederick Trump (originally Friedrich), amassed considerable wealth during the Klondike Gold Rush by running a restaurant and brothel for miners. Friedrich returned to Kallstadt in 1901, and, by the next year, met and married Elizabeth Christ. They moved to New York City, where their first child, Elizabeth, was born in 1904. Later that year, the family returned to Kallstadt. Fred was conceived in Bavaria, where his parents wished to re-establish residency, but Friedrich was banished for dodging the draft. The family returned to New York on July 1, 1905, and moved to the Bronx, where Frederick Christ Trump was born on October 11, 1905. Fred's younger brother, John G. Trump, was born in 1907. All three children were raised speaking German at home. In September 1908, the family moved to Woodhaven, Queens.

Many details of Trump's childhood come from autobiographical accounts and emphasize independence, learning and especially hard work – to the point of being somewhat fictionalized. (Note: In her Trump family biography, Gwenda Blair draws on these accounts and additional interviews with Fred and his kin. Blair only met Fred around the early 1990s, when she says he was "semi out of it".) At the age of 10, Trump worked as a delivery boy for a butcher. About two years later, on Memorial Day, his father died in the 1918 flu pandemic, quite suddenly according to Fred. From 1918 to 1923, Fred attended Richmond Hill High School in Queens, while working as a caddy, curb whitewasher, delivery boy, and newspaper hawker. Meanwhile, his mother continued the real-estate business Friedrich had begun. Interested in becoming a builder, Fred put up a garage for a neighbor and took night classes in carpentry and reading blueprints; he reputedly studied plumbing, masonry, and electrical wiring via correspondence courses, although other biographical sources limit his construction education to the period after high school when he was also working in the field.

After graduating in January 1923, Trump obtained full-time work pulling lumber to construction sites. He studied carpentry and became a carpenter's assistant. (Note: Older newspaper sources say that Trump took his courses at the YMCA, while later books name only Pratt Institute. In her 21st-century biography, Blair says Trump took YMCA courses during high school and Pratt studies after.) Trump's mother held the business in her name until he reached 21, the age of majority. The company name "E. Trump & Son" appeared in advertising by 1924, by which year Trump ostensibly used an $800 loan from his mother to complete and sell his first house. Public records, however, do not support him building until 1927, the year the company was incorporated (and following Trump's 21st birthday). Trump purportedly built 19 more homes by 1926 in Hollis, Queens, selling some before they were finished to finance others. Investigative journalist Wayne Barrett posits that Trump exaggerated the length of his career in 1934 while arguing to a federal court why he should deserve to obtain a dissolved company's mortgage servicer and respective assets.

In 1927, Trump was arrested at a Ku Klux Klan demonstration, although there is no conclusive evidence that he supported the organization. (Note: The KKK was then a far-right white nationalist Protestant group in the U.S. that specifically targeted black and brown people, Jews, Catholics, and immigrants. (It also opposed birth control, consuming alcohol, and the public teaching of evolution.))

=== Rise to success ===
In 1933, Trump built one of New York City's first modern supermarkets, called Trump Market, in Woodhaven, Queens. It was modeled on Long Island's King Kullen, a self-service supermarket chain. Trump's store advertised "Serve Yourself and Save!" and quickly became popular. After six months, Trump sold it to King Kullen.

In federal court in 1934, Trump and a partner acquired the mortgage-servicing subsidiary of Brooklyn's J. Lehrenkrauss Corporation, which had gone bankrupt and had subsequently been broken up. This gave Trump access to the titles of many properties nearing foreclosure, which he bought at low cost and sold at a profit. This and similar real-estate ventures quickly brought him fame as one of New York City's most successful businessmen.

Trump made use of loan subsidies created by the Federal Housing Administration (FHA) not long after the program was initiated via the National Housing Act of 1934, which also enabled the discriminatory practice of redlining. By 1936, Trump had 400 workers (Note: Blair notes that these were all white but of varying national origin.) digging foundations for houses that would be sold at prices ranging from $3,000 to $6,250. Trump used his father's psychological tactic of listing properties at prices ending in "... 9.99". In the late 1930s, he used a boat to advertise off Coney Island's shore; it played patriotic music and floated out swordfish-shaped balloons which could be redeemed for $25 or $250 towards one of his properties. In 1938, the Brooklyn Daily Eagle referred to Trump as "the Henry Ford of the home building industry". During this period, Trump predicted that he would profit from World War II. By 1942, he had built 2,000 homes in Brooklyn using FHA funds.

During the war, the federal Office of Production Management (established in 1941) allowed the use of FHA funding for defense housing in Bensonhurst, Brooklyn, owing to the proximity of the Brooklyn Navy Yard. Trump planned to build 700 houses there, which would have been both his and the state FHA office's biggest project to date, but following the attack on Pearl Harbor and the United States's declaration of war on Japan, the project was dissolved in favor of defense housing at the East Coast's naval nexus, Hampton Roads by Norfolk, Virginia, where Trump was already working on an apartment complex. Congress added a provision to the National Housing Act generating mortgage insurance for defense apartments, through which Trump was allowed to own the properties he built for war workers. By 1944, he had constructed 1,360 wartime apartments, almost 10% of the total created in Norfolk. He also built barracks and garden apartments for U.S. Navy personnel near major shipyards in Norfolk and Newport News, Virginia, as well as Chester, Pennsylvania.

Following the war, Trump expanded into middle-income housing for the families of returning veterans. From 1947 to 1949, he built Shore Haven in Bensonhurst, which included 32 six-story buildings and a shopping center, covering some 30 acres (12 hectares) and procuring him $9 million in FHA funding. In 1950, he built the 23-building Beach Haven Apartments over 40 acres (16 ha) near Coney Island, procuring him $16 million in FHA funds. The total number of apartments included in these projects exceeded 2,700. (Note: Also in 1950, Trump authored an article advertising his apartments in the Brooklyn Eagle, which frequently featured him and his company.)

Decades after hiring PR man Howard Rubenstein to generate press about his life story mirroring the rags-to-riches novels of 19th-century author Horatio Alger, in 1985, Fred was awarded the Horatio Alger Award (for "distinguished Americans"). Radio and television personality Art Linkletter introduced Trump at the ceremony, with Protestant minister Norman Vincent Peale's wife (and previous award recipient), Ruth Peale, presenting him the award. During his speech, Trump stated that the key to his success was enthusiasm for his work and that he "used to watch other successful people ... that did good and that did bad and ... followed the good qualities that they had". He then (apparently erroneously) attributed to William Shakespeare the saying "Never follow an empty wagon because", pointing to his cranium, "nothing ever falls off". He went on to introduce his surviving family.

== Further enterprises ==
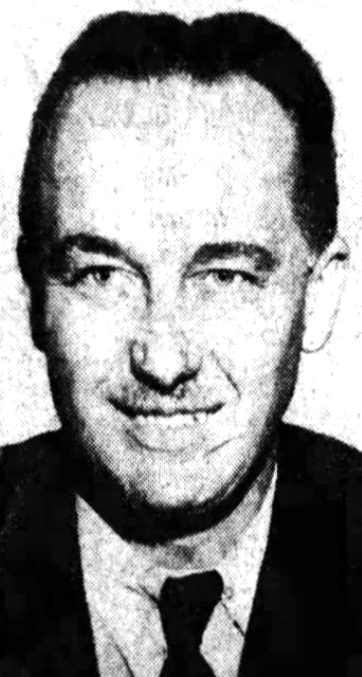
Trump c. 1950

In early 1954, President Dwight D. Eisenhower and other federal leaders began denouncing real-estate profiteers. That June, The New York Times included Trump on a list of 35 city builders accused of profiteering from government contracts. He and others were investigated by a U.S. Senate banking committee for windfall gains. Trump and his partner William Tomasello (Note: Tomasello, who had mafia ties, owned 25% of Beach Haven Apartments and Trump described as "a brick contractor [and] an old-time property owner". In addition to money, Trump may have worked with Tomasello to avoid problems with the mafia or unions. From 1959 to 1961, Tomasello sued Trump in the New York Supreme Court as a stockholder of 25% of ten of Trump's corporations, as well as 14 subsidiaries and 4 sub-subsidiaries.) were cited as examples of how profits were made by builders using the FHA. The two paid $34,200 for a piece of land which they rented to their corporation for $76,960 annually in a 99-year lease, so that if the apartment they built on it ever defaulted, the FHA would owe them $1.924 million. Trump and Tomasello evidently obtained loans for $3.5 million more than Beach Haven Apartments had cost. Trump argued that because he had not withdrawn the money, he had not literally pocketed the profits. He further argued that due to rising costs, he would have had to invest more than the 10% of the mortgage loan not provided by the FHA, and therefore suffer a loss if he built under those conditions.

In 1961, Trump donated $2,500 to the re-election campaign of New York mayor Robert F. Wagner Jr., helping him gain favor for the construction of Trump Village, a large apartment complex in Coney Island. The project was constructed in 1963–64 for $70 million. It was one of Trump's biggest and last major projects, and the only one to bear his name. He built more than 27,000 low-income apartments and row houses in the New York area altogether, including Brooklyn (in Coney Island, Bensonhurst, Sheepshead Bay, Flatbush, and Brighton Beach) and Queens (in Flushing and Jamaica Estates).

In 1966, Trump was again investigated for windfall profiteering, this time by New York State investigators. After Trump overestimated building costs sponsored by a state program, he profited $598,000 on equipment rentals in the construction of Trump Village, which was then spent on other projects. Under testimony on January 27, 1966, Trump said that he had personally done nothing wrong and praised the success of his building project. The commission called Trump "a pretty shrewd character" with a "talent for getting every ounce of profit out of his housing project", but no indictments were made. It was suggested instead that the state's housing program was in need of tighter administration protocols and accountability. A deputy attorney general corresponded with the Federal Bureau of Investigation (FBI) regarding any reports it had about Trump before he was set to be deposed on March 31, 1966.

=== Steeplechase Park ===
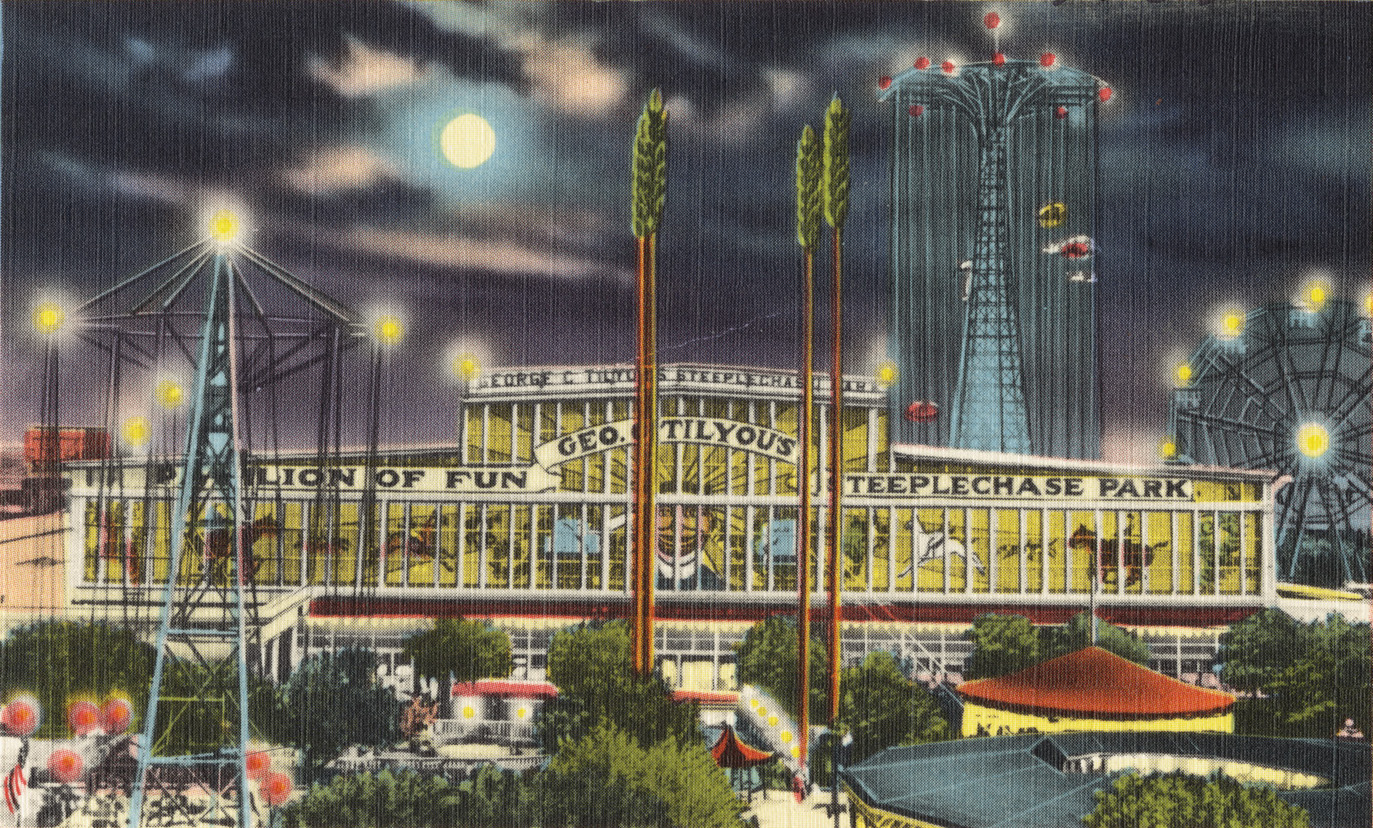
Illustration of Steeplechase Park, with the Pavilion of Fun's "Funny Face" mascot in the middle of its facade

On July 1, 1965, Trump purchased Coney Island's recently closed Steeplechase Park for $2.3 million, intending to build luxury apartments. The next year, he announced plans for a 160-foot-high (49-meter) enclosed dome with recreational facilities and a convention center. At a highly publicized ceremony in September 1966, Trump demolished the park's Pavilion of Fun, a large glass-enclosed amusement center. He reportedly sold bricks to ceremony guests to smash the remaining glass panels, which included an iconic representation of the park's mascot, the "Funny Face". The next month, New York City announced plans to acquire the former park grounds for recreational use. Trump filed a series of court cases related to the proposed rezoning, ultimately winning $1.3 million. After the site sat vacant for several years, Trump started subleasing it to a manager of fairground amusement park rides. Over another decade, the city eventually succeeded in reclaiming the property.

In July 2016, the Coney Island History Project held a special exhibit for the "50th Anniversary of Fred Trump's Demolition of Steeplechase Pavilion".

=== Son becomes company president ===
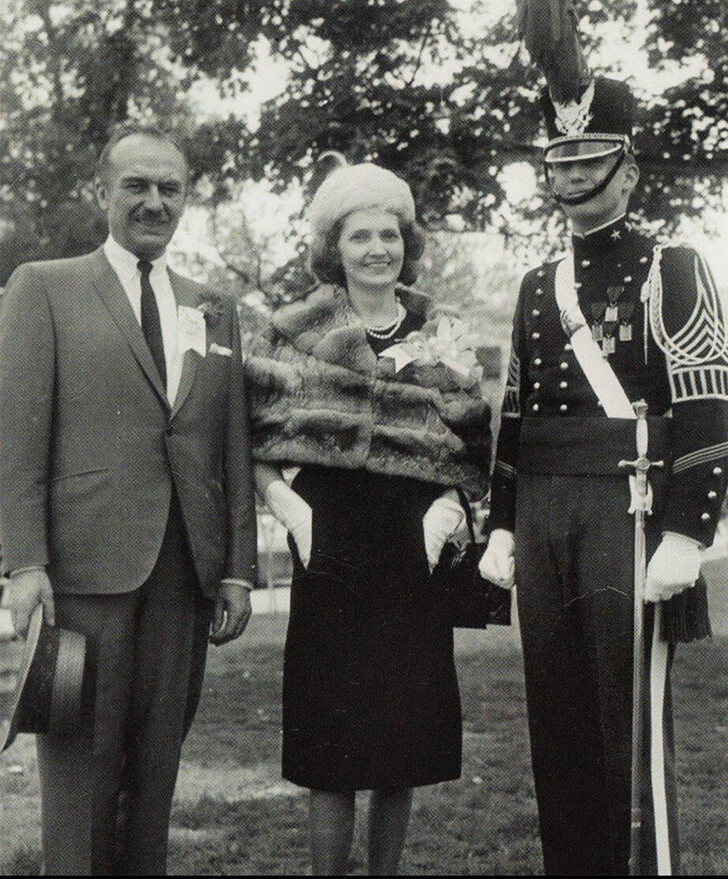
Fred with his wife, Mary, and son Donald Trump c. 1964

Fred's son Donald joined his father's real-estate business around 1968, initially working in Brooklyn. That year, Fred reputedly secured Donald a deferment from the Vietnam War by prioritizing maintenance for a tenant who (ostensibly in exchange) diagnosed Donald with bone spurs. In 1971, Donald became president of the company, with Fred becoming chairman. Donald began calling the company 'the Trump Organization' around 1973. The younger Trump entered the real-estate business in Manhattan, while his father operated primarily in Brooklyn, Queens, and Staten Island. Donald stated, "It was good for me. You know, being the son of somebody, it could have been competition to me. This way, I got Manhattan all to myself." Fred reputedly said, "I gave Donald free rein. He has great vision and everything he touches seems to turn to gold. ... [He] is the smartest person I know."

According to some sources, Fred himself planned the expansion to Manhattan. His granddaughter Mary L. Trump states that he was "intimately involved in all aspects of Donald's early forays into the Manhattan market". Louise Sunshine (organization vice president from 1973 to 1985) claims Fred was "behind [Donald] in every way, shape and form [including] financing". According to another source, Fred came to work "every day until ... he went to the hospital".

In the mid-1970s, Donald received loans from his father exceeding $14 million. In 2015–16, during his campaign for U.S. president, Donald claimed that his father had given him "a small loan of a million dollars" which he used to build "a company that's worth more than $10 billion". An October 2018 New York Times exposé on Fred and Donald Trump's finances revealed that Fred created 295 income streams for Donald and concludes that the latter "was a millionaire by age 8", receiving $413 million (adjusted for inflation; $483.6 million in 2023 currency) from Fred's business empire over his lifetime, including over $60.7 million (unadjusted for inflation; $163.9 million in 2023 currency) in loans, which were largely unreimbursed. (Note: When Donald Trump renovated the Grand Hyatt New York in the late 1970s, Fred provided $2 million to help repay the construction loan. He further assisted his son with a $35 million line of credit, a $30 million mortgage, and an additional corporate loan.)

According to Trump construction vice president Barbara Res, Fred seated business guests in an off-balance chair and advised Donald to arrange his office so that adversaries could be forced to face the sun.

=== Federal civil rights lawsuit ===
Minority applicants turned away from renting apartments complained to the New York City Commission on Human Rights and the Urban League, leading these groups to send test applicants to Trump-owned complexes in July 1972. They found that white people were offered apartments, while Black people were generally turned away (by being told there were no vacancies); (Note: Mary L. Trump wrote in 2020 that Fred called people of color who wished to rent from him "die Schwarze" ('the Black[s]').) according to the superintendent of Beach Haven Apartments, this was at the direction of his boss. Both of the aforementioned advocacy organizations then raised the issue with the Justice Department. In October 1973, the Civil Rights Division of the U.S. Department of Justice (DOJ) filed a civil rights lawsuit against the Trump Organization (Fred Trump, chair, and Donald Trump, president) for infringing the Fair Housing Act of 1968. In response, Trump attorney Roy Cohn countersued for $100 million in damages, accusing the DOJ of false accusations.

The FBI interviewed about three dozen former Trump employees. Some testified that they had no knowledge of any racial profiling practices and that a small percentage of their apartments were rented to Black people or Puerto Ricans. (Note: Trump personally requested that a lease agreement not be made unless the tenant had a monthly income four times the rent. Former employees were asked whether Jewish applicants were shown preference; one former employee felt that such applicants "had an easier time of getting an apartment than anyone else".) A former doorman testified that his supervisor had instructed him to tell prospective Black tenants that the rent was double its actual amount. Four landlords or rental agents confirmed that applications sent to the Trump organization's head office for approval were coded by the race of the applicant. One former employee testified that a code – which he believed was used throughout the Brooklyn branch of the company – referred to "low lifes" such as "blacks, Puerto Ricans, apparent drug users, or any other type of undesirable applicant", and nine times out of ten it meant the applicant was Black; Black people were also falsely told there were no vacancies. A rental agent who had worked with the company for two weeks said that when he asked Fred Trump if he should rent to Black people, he was told that it was "absolutely against the law to discriminate", but after asking again, he was instructed "not to rent to blacks", and was further advised to:

get rid of the blacks that were in the building by telling them cheap housing was available for them at only $500 down payment, which Trump would offer to pay himself. Trump didn't tell me where this housing was located. He advised me not to rent to persons on welfare.

Meanwhile, Trump acquired up to 20% of Brooklyn's Starrett City, a large, federally subsidized housing complex which opened in 1974 with the stated desegregation goal of renting 70% of its units to white people and the rest to minorities.

A consent decree between the DOJ and the Trump Organization was signed on June 10, 1975, with both sides claiming victory – the Trump Organization because the settlement did not require them "to accept persons on welfare as tenants", and the head of the DOJ's housing division for the decree being "one of the most far-reaching ever negotiated". It personally and corporately prohibited the Trumps from "discriminating against any person in the ... sale or rental of a dwelling", and "required Trump to advertise vacancies in minority papers [for two years], promote minorities to professional jobs, and list vacancies on a preferential basis". Finally, it ordered the Trumps to "thoroughly acquaint themselves personally on a detailed basis with ... the Fair Housing Act of 1968".

=== Later legal trespasses ===
In 1975, tenants of two of Trump's Norfolk tower complexes held a monthlong rent strike due to rodent and insect infestations, as well as problems with water heating, air conditioning, and elevator service. In early 1976, Trump was ordered by a county judge to correct code violations in a 504-unit property in Seat Pleasant, Maryland. According to the county's housing department investigator, violations included broken windows, dilapidated gutters, and missing fire extinguishers. (Note: According to the vice president of the subsidiary company responsible for the property, it had recently seen an increase in low-income tenants.) After a court date and a series of phone calls with Trump, he was invited to the property to meet with county officials in September 1976 and arrested on site. Trump was released on $1,000 bail.

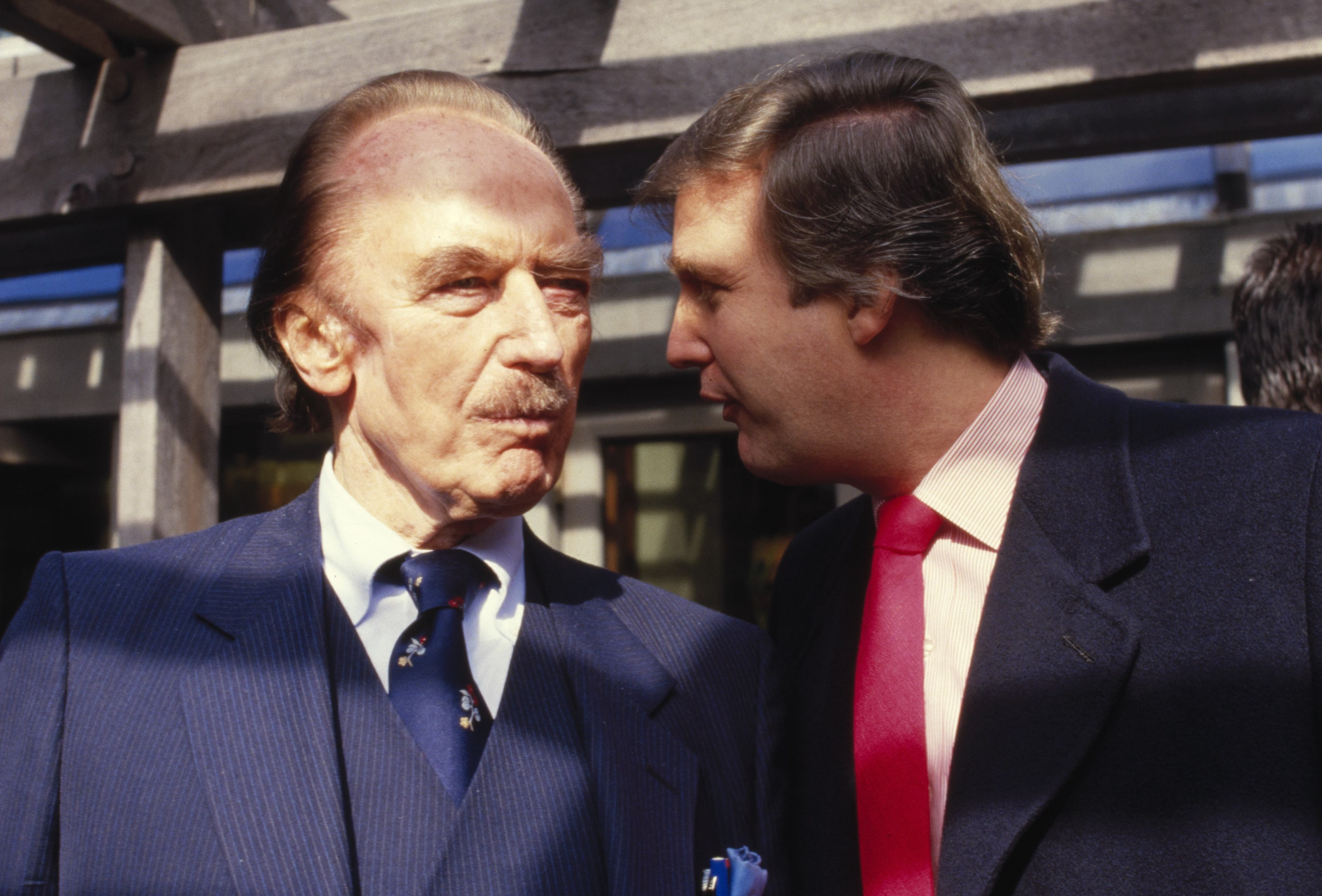
Fred and Donald at Central Park's Wollman Ice Rink (c. 1986), which was renovated by their company c. 1980–1986

In 1987, when Donald's loan debt to his father exceeded $11 million, Fred invested $15.5 million in Trump Palace Condominiums; in 1991, he sold these shares to his son for $10,000, thus appearing to evade millions of dollars in gift taxes by masking a hidden donation, and also benefiting from a legally questionable write-off. In late 1990, when an $18.4 million bond payment for Atlantic City's Trump's Castle was due, Fred sent a bookkeeper to buy $3.5 million in casino chips, which were not used. Trump's Castle quickly made its bond payment. The state's Casino Control Commission found the transaction to constitute an illegal loan and fined the casino $65,000.

In 1992, Fred and Donald set up a subsidiary company in which each of Fred's living children owned a 20% stake. As detailed in 2018 by The New York Times, the business entity had no apparent legitimate purpose and was evidently used to conduct tax fraud by funneling millions of dollars of Fred's wealth to his progeny without paying gift taxes. This was accomplished by billing Fred much more than the actual cost of maintenance work and goods such as boilers.

== Wealth and death ==
In 1976, Trump set up trust funds of $1 million ($5.3 million in 2023) for each of his five children and three grandchildren, which paid out yearly dividends. Trump appeared on the initial Forbes 400 list of richest Americans in 1982 with an estimated $200 million fortune split with his son Donald. That same year, Fred sold two Norfolk towers and some Hampton Roads military housing, the latter for $8–9 million, with perhaps $6.6 million pledged in promissory notes (which were apparently outstanding as of 2019). In 1998, a year before Fred's death, while he was suffering from Alzheimer's disease and his son Robert had power of attorney, the notes were transferred to limited liability companies connected to Trump Organization subsidiaries.

In December 1990, Donald Trump sought to amend his father's will, which according to Fred's daughter Maryanne Trump Barry, "was basically taking the whole estate and giving it to Donald", allowing him to "sell, do anything he wants ... with the properties". The Washington Post wrote that this "was designed to protect Donald Trump's inheritance from efforts to seize it by creditors and Ivana", whom he divorced that month. Fred rejected the proposal, and in 1991, composed his own final will, which made his children Donald, Maryanne, and Robert Trump co-executors of his estate. Trump's lawyer noted that Fred Jr.'s children, Fred III and Mary L. Trump, would be treated unequally because they would not receive their deceased father's share: "Given the size of your estate, this is tantamount to disinheriting them. You may wish to increase their participation in your estate to avoid ill will in the future." (Note: Fred Jr.'s children both received $200,000, the same amount given to each grandchild, but were excluded from Mary Trump's will.) In October 1991, Trump was diagnosed with "mild senile dementia", with his physician citing symptoms of "obvious memory decline in recent years" and "significant memory impairment". A few months later, another physician reported that Trump "did not know his birth date [or] age", amongst other difficulties. Mary L. Trump recounted that as her grandfather's dementia progressed, he failed to recognize people he had known for decades, including her and Donald. According to Fred III, his grandfather needed to be reminded why he was at Donald's 1993 wedding (to Marla Maples) despite being designated the best man. Donald claimed that he first noticed his father exhibit symptoms of Alzheimer's in the mid-1990s.

In 1993, the anticipated shares of Trump's estate amounted to $35 million for each surviving child. (Note: Having taken heavy losses by this time, Donald asked his siblings to lend him $10 million from their shares, and soon asked for $20 million more.) Most of his buildings were transferred to two grantor-retained annuity trusts under his and his wife's names, which were used to give about two-thirds of the assets to their four surviving children, who bought the remaining third via annuity payments between 1995 and November 1997. The collective assets had a declared value of only $41.4 million, but in 2004 were sold for over 16 times this value, avoiding hundreds of millions of dollars in gift taxes.

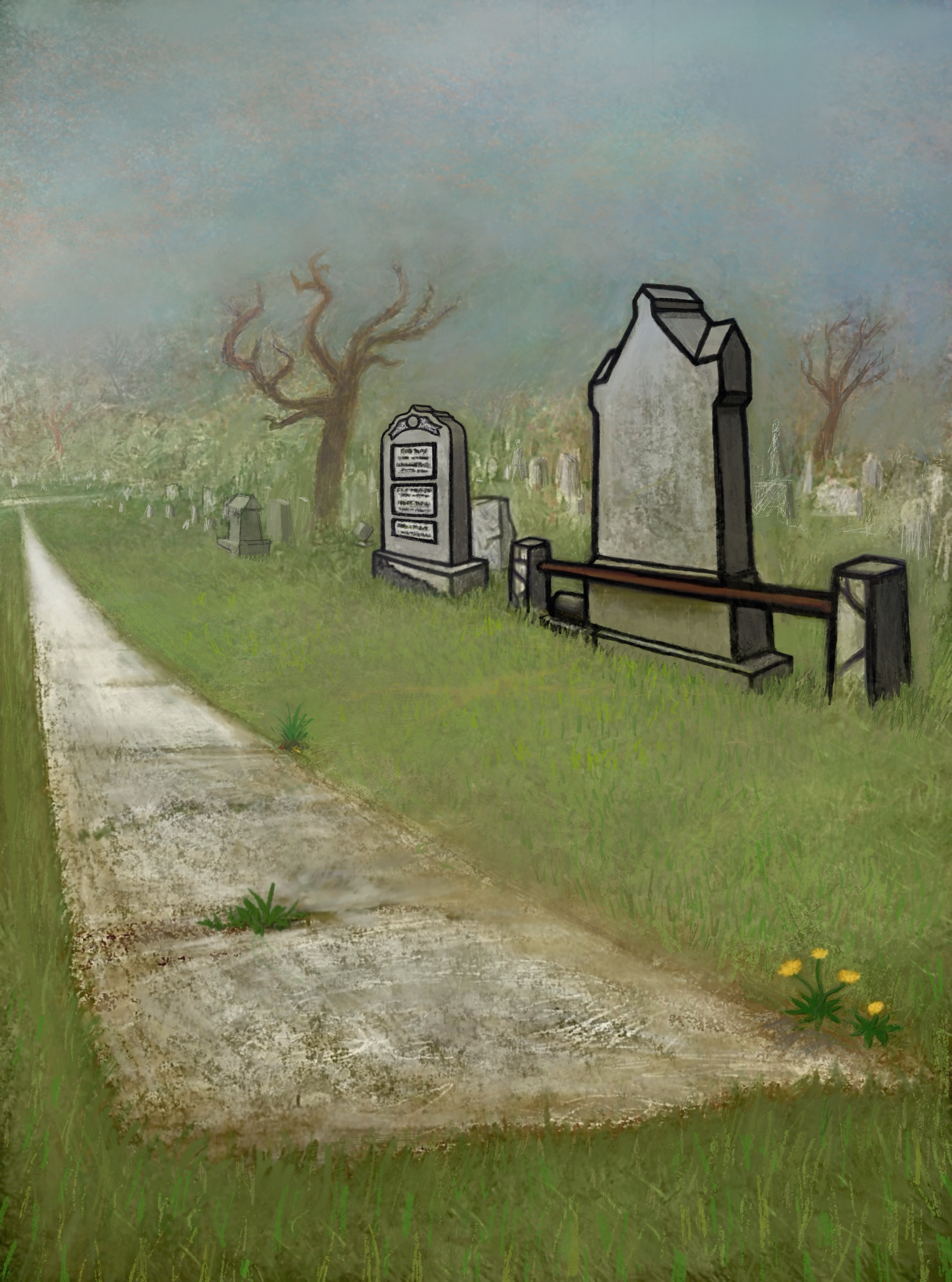
Painted depiction of Trump's grave (Note: The plot is located south of Metropolitan Avenue, with a uniquely paved path ending nearby.)

Trump finally fell ill with pneumonia and was admitted to Long Island Jewish Medical Center (LIJMC) for a few weeks, where he died at age 93 on June 25, 1999. A wake was held at Frank E. Campbell Funeral Chapel ahead of his funeral at the Marble Collegiate Church, which was attended by over 600 people. (Note: In his eulogy, Donald Trump promoted his own business success. Other attendees included New York mayor Rudy Giuliani, who spoke, and Trump family biographer Gwenda Blair.) His body was buried in a family plot at the Lutheran-Christian All Faiths Cemetery in Middle Village, Queens. Upon his death, Trump's estate was estimated by his family at $250 million to $300 million, though he had only $1.9 million in cash. His will divided over $20 million after taxes among his surviving children and grandchildren. His widow, Mary, died on August 7, 2000, at age 88, also at LIJMC. Her and Fred's combined estate was then valued at $51.8 million.

Following Trump's death, Fred Jr.'s children contested their grandfather's will, citing his dementia and claiming that the will was "procured by fraud and undue influence" by Donald, Maryanne, and Robert Trump. These three had claimed in their legal depositions that Fred Trump was "sharp as a tack" until just before his death, but otherwise stated that they were aware of his cognitive decline. According to Mary L. Trump, Donald denigrated his father after Fred began demonstrating Alzheimer's symptoms.

In December 2003, it was reported that Trump's four surviving children would sell the apartments they acquired in 1997 to an investment group led by Rubin Schron, priced at $600 million; the sale occurred in May 2004. The 2016 leak of Donald Trump's tax information from 2005, which showed an income of $153 million, prompted The New York Times to investigate, leading to the 2018 exposé. (Note: Sparked by the 2017 publication of Donald Trump's tax information from 2005, this drew from 2,200 pages of U.S. federal judge Maryanne Trump Barry's financial disclosure forms, interviews with former Trump advisers and employees, and over 100,000 pages of tax returns and financial records from Trump businesses. Mary L. Trump provided 19 boxes of these financial records.) The Times reported that the properties sold in 2004 were valued over 16 times their previously declared worth. Fred and Mary reportedly provided their children with over $1 billion altogether, which should have been taxed at the rate of 55% for gifts and inheritances over $550 million, but records show that a total of only $52.2 million (about 5%) was paid. According to New York State law, individuals can be prosecuted on the basis of intentional tax evasion if a fraudulent return form can be produced as evidence; the statute of limitations does not apply in such cases. By February 1, 2019, Maryanne Trump Barry was being investigated for possible judicial misconduct regarding the schemes, but this was mooted later in the month due to her retirement.

== Personal life ==
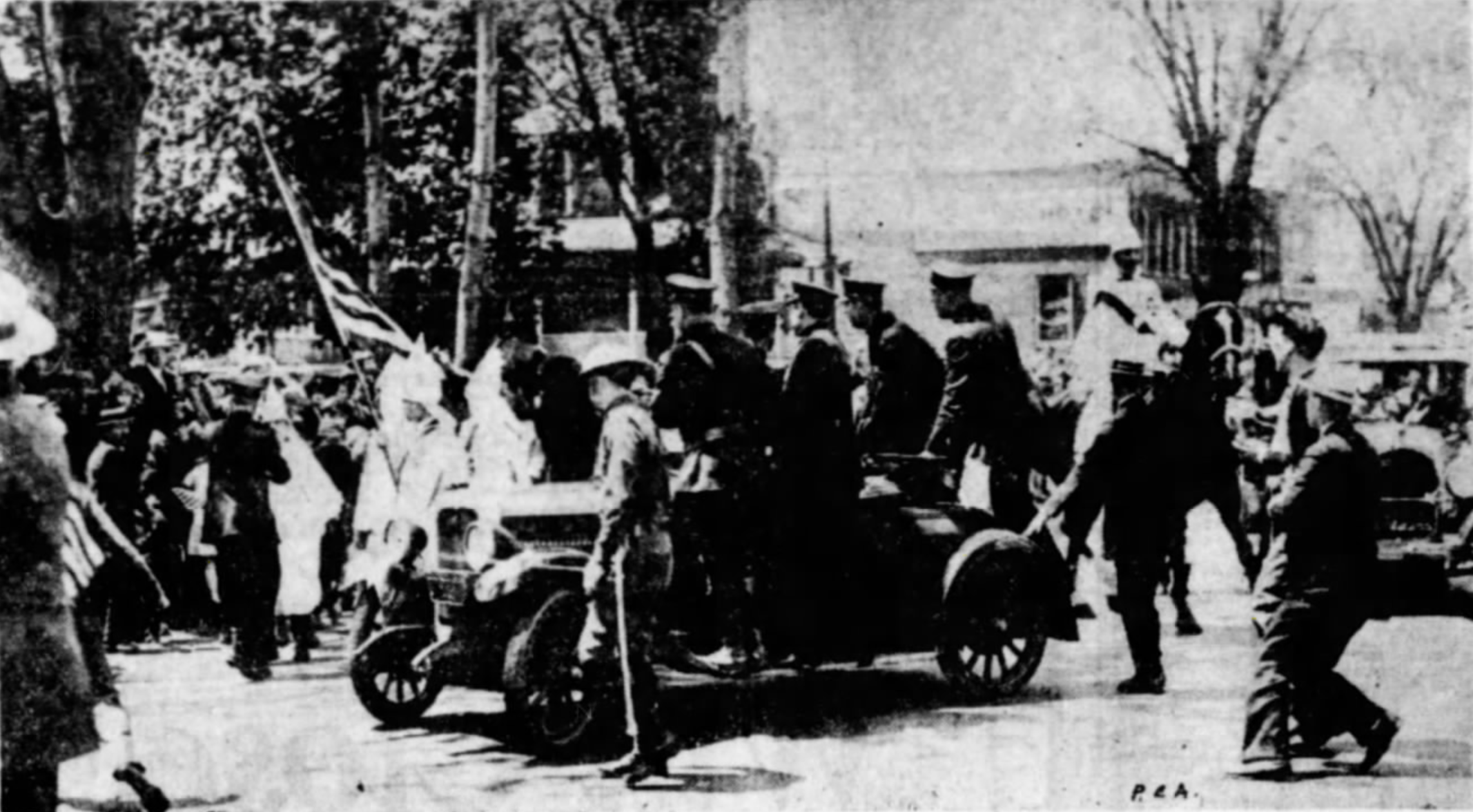
A group of defiant Ku Klux Klan members is accosted by police in Queens on Memorial Day 1927; others stand by.

In May 1927, over 1,000 robed members of the Ku Klux Klan (KKK) and 400 non-robed KKK supporters infiltrated a Memorial Day parade in Queens, prompting stern police intervention. Eight men were arrested, including the 21-year old Trump, whose charge of "refusing to disperse from a parade when ordered to do so" was dismissed. Another man, arrested on the same charge, was released on the basis of having been a bystander (whose foot was injured by a police car). Some newspaper articles on the incident list Trump's address (in Jamaica, Queens), which he is recorded as living at on various documents from 1928 to 1940. Despite this arrest, there is no incontrovertible evidence that Trump was a supporter of the KKK.

Trump met his future wife, Mary Anne MacLeod, an immigrant from Tong, Lewis, Scotland, at a dance party in the early to mid-1930s. Trump told his mother the same evening that he had met his future wife. Trump, a Lutheran, married Mary, a Presbyterian, on January 11, 1936, at the Madison Avenue Presbyterian Church with George Arthur Buttrick officiating. A wedding reception was held at the Carlyle Hotel in Manhattan, and they had a single-night honeymoon in Atlantic City. The couple settled in Jamaica, Queens, and had five children: Maryanne Trump Barry (1937–2023), Fred Trump Jr. (1938–1981; an airline pilot with Trans World Airlines), Elizabeth Trump Grau (born 1942; a retired executive of Chase Manhattan Bank), Donald Trump (born 1946), and Robert Trump (1948–2020; a top executive of his father's property management company until his retirement).

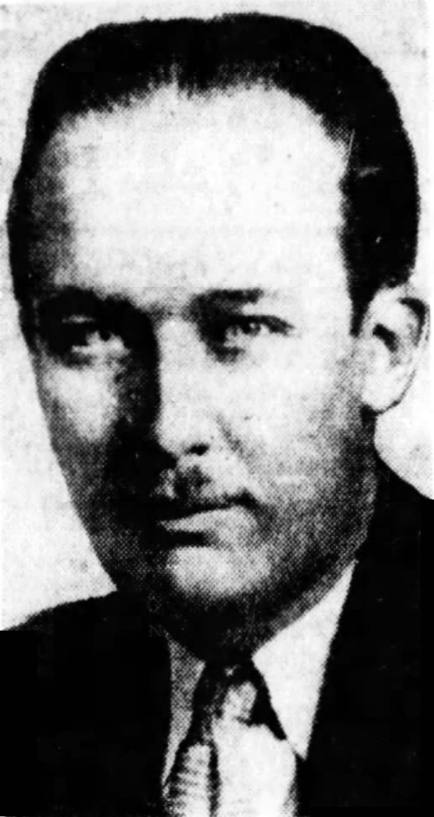
c. 1940

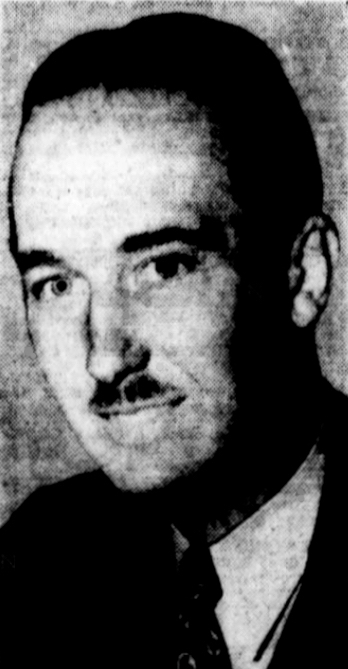
c. 1941

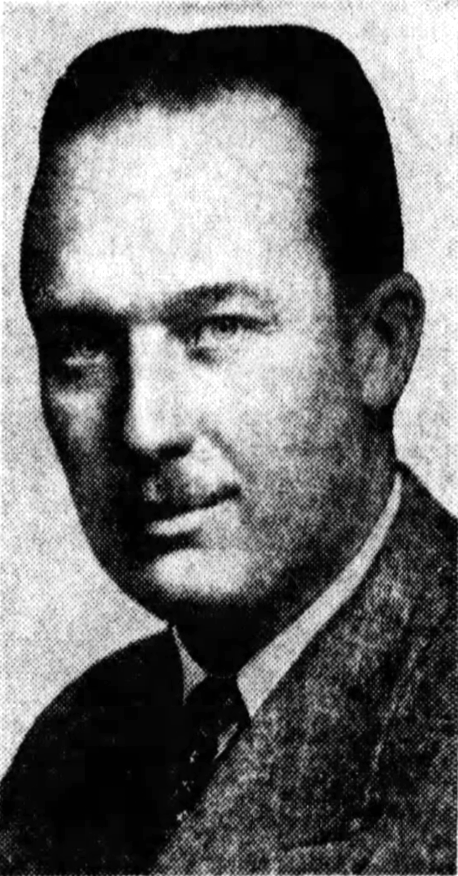
c. 1950

c. 1950

Some midcentury portraits of Trump evidence photograph manipulation. (Note: Public photography from this era is nearly exclusive to the Trump-friendly Brooklyn Eagle. More public photos exist from c. 1955 on.)

During World War II, Trump began concealing his German ancestry. Notwithstanding his German accent (later replaced by a New York one), he denied that he spoke the language. Partly due to the prominence of Jews in New York, he supported Jewish causes, with contributions (apparently starting in 1941, two weeks after the U.S. entered the war) convincing some he practiced Judaism. Fred Jr.'s daughter, Mary L. Trump, later also claimed her grandfather was "quite anti-Semitic". (Note: While Hitler's anti-Semitism was well known, the Holocaust did not start in earnest until 1941, with U.S. reports first published in late 1942.) He also omitted the "h" from his middle name (sidestepping the potential implication he could be antisemitic as a Christian). Trump later falsely claimed that he was of Swedish descent and in 1973 wrongly stated that he was born in New Jersey; these deceptions were sustained in the 1980s by Donald Trump and the author of Donald's first biography. During the 1980s, Fred became friends with the Israeli ambassador to the United Nations, Benjamin Netanyahu, later the prime minister of Israel.

After Elizabeth's birth, and with the U.S. becoming more involved in the war, Trump moved his family to Hampton Roads's Virginia Beach. In 1944, as Trump's FHA funding lulled, they returned to Jamaica Estates, Queens, where Mary suffered a miscarriage. By 1946, they were living in a five-bedroom Tudor-style house Trump built in Jamaica Estates, and Trump purchased a neighboring 0.5-acre (0.2 ha) lot, where he built a 23-room, 9-bathroom mansion. The family moved in during 1950–1951, and Fred and Mary remained there until their deaths. The couple was also given an apartment on the 55th (labelled the 63rd) floor of Donald's Trump Tower (c. 1983), which they rarely if ever used.

Trump was a teetotaler (Note: According to Timothy L. O'Brien's review of Too Much and Never Enough (2020) by Trump's granddaughter Mary L. Trump, "Fred Sr., a teetotaler, kept an elegant bar outfitted with everything but alcohol ... guarded" by a number of cigar store Indians.) and an authoritarian parent, imposing strict table manners and curfews, as well as forbidding cursing, lipstick, and snacking between meals. At the end of his day, Trump would receive a report from Mary on the children's behavior and, if necessary, decide upon disciplinary actions. Additionally, the mansion featured a surveillance system and an intercom, which Trump used to censure his children. He took his children to building sites to collect empty bottles to return for the deposits. The boys had paper routes, but in bad weather he would let them make their deliveries in a limousine. Trump discouraged interests such as playing music. According to Fred Jr.'s daughter, Mary L. Trump, Fred Sr. wanted his oldest son to be "invulnerable" in personality so he could take over the family business, but Fred Jr. was the opposite. Trump instead coached Donald to become his business heir, telling him to "be a killer" and "You are a king." Mary L. Trump states that Fred Sr. "dismantled [Fred Jr.] by devaluing and degrading every aspect of his personality" and mocked him for his decision to become an airline pilot. In 1981, Fred Jr. died at age 42 from complications of alcoholism.

According to Donald Trump, while his mother was watching the 1953 coronation of Elizabeth II on television, Fred said while pacing around, "For Christ's sake, Mary. Enough is enough, turn it off. They're all a bunch of con artists." Also in the 1950s, Fred became an admirer of Norman Vincent Peale, the author of The Power of Positive Thinking (1952), due to his businesslike approach to life and Christianity. (Note: Peale was involved in various right-wing political groups, including a coalition of ministers and industrialists opposed to the New Deal and associated with the America First policy opposing U.S. entry into World War II. Peale was also an associate of Republican presidents Richard Nixon and Ronald Reagan.) Trump and his family attended sermons by Peale at Manhattan's Marble Collegiate Church. Trump was also a supporter of Southern Baptist evangelist Billy Graham, taking his family to see Graham speak at Yankee Stadium (c. 1957).

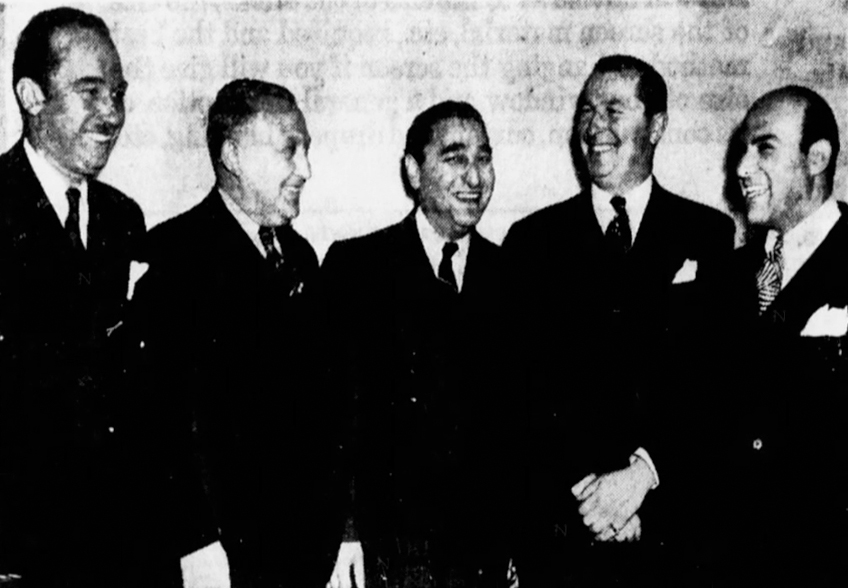
Trump (far left) and other realtors at a New York–Brooklyn Jewish charity fundraising dinner in 1941

=== Philanthropy ===
Fred and Mary Trump supported medical charities by donating buildings. After Mary received medical care at the Jamaica Hospital Medical Center, they donated the Trump Pavilion rehabilitation building; Fred was also a trustee of the hospital. The couple donated a two-building complex in Brooklyn as a home for "functionally retarded adults", a New Jersey building valued at $4.75 million to United Cerebral Palsy (which Donald took credit for), and other buildings to the National Kidney Foundation (NKF). Trump donated one of his least profitable properties to the NKF, which according to The New York Times was "one of the largest charitable donations he ever made", with a deduction proportional to its stated value, claimed in his 1992 tax return as $34 million.

Particularly after U.S. entry into World War II in late 1941, Trump backed both Jewish and Israeli causes. This included donating the land for the Beach Haven Jewish Center, a synagogue in Flatbush, Brooklyn, c. 1951, purchasing Israel Bonds (introduced in 1951) and serving as the treasurer of a 1952 Israel benefit concert featuring American easy-listening performers.

Fred supported the private Kew-Forest School, where his children attended and he served on the board of directors. The Trumps were active in The Salvation Army, the Boy Scouts of America, and the Lighthouse for the Blind. Fred reportedly also supported the Long Island Jewish Hospital and Manhattan's Hospital for Special Surgery; at the latter, he was a patient of orthopedist Philip D. Wilson Jr., the hospital's lead surgeon from 1972 to 1989.

Although he was registered as a Republican Party voter, Trump developed ties with the Democratic Party in New York, contributing to city politicians (including $2,500 to Mayor Wagner's 1961 campaign, enabling the construction of Trump Village). Together with Donald in the 1980s, Fred provided over $350,000 to city politicians including Mayor Ed Koch, Council president Andrew Stein, Controller Harrison J. Goldin, and four of the five borough presidents.

In October 2018, The New York Times reported in an exposé on Trump's financial records that they had found no evidence that he had made any significant financial contributions to charities.

== Legacy ==
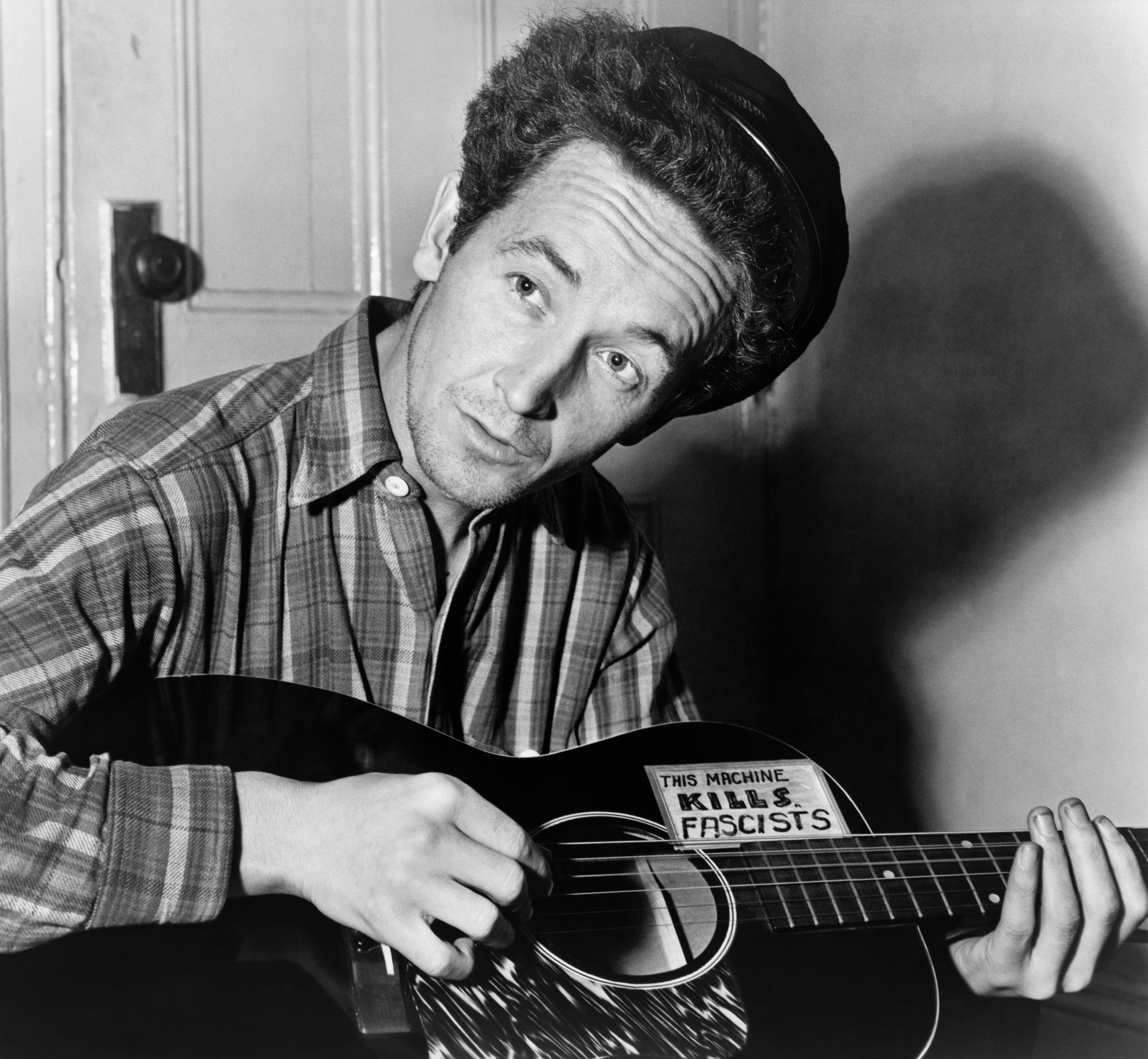
Singer Woody Guthrie (1943)

Folk singer Woody Guthrie was a tenant of Beach Haven Apartments from 1950 to 1951. In his unrecorded song "Old Man Trump", he complains about the rent and accused Trump of stirring up racial hate "in the bloodpot of human hearts". Similarly, in an unreleased version of "Ain't Got No Home", Guthrie states:

Beach Haven looks like heaven
Where no black ones come to roam!
No, no, no! Old Man Trump!
Old Beach Haven ain't my home!

Trump was indirectly claimed as a relative of Republican politician Fred J. Trump, a candidate in the 1956 Arizona gubernatorial election and correspondent of Richard Nixon during his 1960 presidential campaign against John F. Kennedy.

Jerome Tuccille's 1985 biography of Donald Trump repeats Fred's fabrication that he was born in New Jersey and erroneously states that his middle name was Charles (not Christ). Donald's The Art of the Deal (1987) also claims that Fred was born in New Jersey as the son of an immigrant from Sweden (not Germany). The New York Post repeated the latter claim in its eulogy for Fred. As U.S. president, Donald incorrectly stated several times that his father was born in Germany. According to a 2021 book about the last year of Donald's first presidency, he once spoke disparagingly of German Chancellor Angela Merkel, stating, "I know the fucking krauts", and pointing to his father's portrait, continued, "I was raised by the biggest kraut of them all." (Note: In 1990, Ivana Trump said that Fred's nephew, family historian and organization executive John Walter, greeted Donald at work by clicking his heels and saying "Heil Hitler", possibly as a family joke.) During his second presidency, Donald contended that German Chancellor Friedrich Merz "knows all about my father".

In his 1993 biography of Donald Trump, Harry Hurt III asserts that Fred was a philanderer, with his alleged affairs in Florida leading him to be known as the "King of Miami Beach". In 1989 (while Donald was married to Ivana but tabloids had begun reporting about his affair with future wife Marla Maples), Fred reputedly lectured Donald that he could "have a thousand mistresses" but not to get caught in a single specific extramarital affair. According to Hurt, after Donald decided to accompany Ivana to her father's funeral in Czechoslovakia (amid their pending divorce), Fred told a longtime secretary and personal confidant, "I hope their plane crashes. Then all my problems will be solved."

During Donald Trump's 2016 presidential campaign, his father's 1927 arrest at a KKK march resurfaced. In mid-February 2017, Israeli newspaper Haaretz asserted that both Donald Trump (who had called Fred his only 'hero') and Israeli Prime Minister Benjamin Netanyahu had learned racism from their fathers, Trump against brown people and Netanyahu against Arabs. Three days later, the FBI declassified 389 pages from its early 1970s investigation of alleged racial discrimination by the Trump Organization. In his 2018 psychological profile of Donald, Justin A. Frank asserted that Fred was antisemitic. In 2020, Mary L. Trump supported this claim and said Fred could have been sympathetic to the KKK.

In May 2016, in an article about Donald Trump's pseudonyms, Fortune reported that his father had used the false name "Mr. Green" to anonymously inquire about property values. In October 2016, in response to numerous Freedom of Information Act requests, the FBI released a small file it had on Fred; it includes a 1986 news article concerning political donations by Trump Management, a highly redacted 1991 memo concerning rumors of ties to organized crime, and a background report on Trump Construction Corp. In 2018, writing for New York magazine in response to the New York Times exposé, Jonathan Chait opined that many of Fred's contributions to Donald were by definition criminal in nature.

In mid-2020, liberal political action committee (PAC) MeidasTouch cited the "empty wagon" quote from Trump's Horatio Alger Association speech in arguing that Donald both squandered the fortune he inherited from his father and the "booming economy" left to him by the Obama administration. The Art of the Deal ghostwriter Tony Schwartz stated in 2020 that the "brutal" Fred lacked emotional intelligence, which affected his sons. In her 2020 book, Too Much and Never Enough, Mary L. Trump (a clinical psychologist) asserts that Fred was a high-functioning sociopath who impaired Donald's emotional development. According to a 2024 article in the psychohistorical journal Clio's Psyche, the "cruel" and deceptive Fred deprived Donald of "basic, life-affirming emotional nourishment" (while calling him a "killer", etc.), resulting in Donald's "absence of moral responsibility".

Following Donald Trump's arrest in New York in 2023, some media outlets pointed out that his father had been arrested twice.

=== In popular culture ===
In the 2011 Comedy Central Roast of Donald Trump, the American comedian Seth MacFarlane credited Donald's fortune to his father, mocking the former's "self-starter bullshit" and comparing their relationship to that of Jaden and Will Smith.

In late 2016, Nell Scovell wrote about an unsuccessful attempt to visit Trump's grave in Esquire, noting that an online photograph implied it to be surprisingly modest. After asking for directions, Scovell was elusively jawboned by the cemetery president.

In 2018, Nylon.com invoked a photograph of the elderly Trump with a pronounced depression behind one cheek (from a mandibulectomy) to opine that the New York Times exposé "led people to know, perhaps for the first time, what Fred Trump looks like—and it turns out he bears resemblance to no shortage of fictional villains". Since 2018, Trump has been portrayed in various media. (Note: E.g., in an episode of Jimmy Kimmel Live!, Fred Willard plays Trump as a ghost proud of taking his crimes to his grave but vexed at Donald's failures. Trump is depicted in episodes of Our Cartoon President (2018–2020) and a racist character apparently based on him appears in an episode of the 2019 television series Watchmen. John Diehl plays him in the 2022 film Armageddon Time, based on director James Gray's recollection of him at Kew-Forest. In 2024, he was portrayed by Martin Donovan in the Donald Trump biopic The Apprentice and the Lincoln Project PAC depicted him via artificial intelligence.)

In 2019, the American journalist and conspiracy theorist Wayne Madsen accused Fred of being a Nazi sympathizer on the basis of the German American Bund's presence in New York. In mid-2020, fact-checking company Logically concluded that there was a lack of clear evidence that Trump was a Nazi supporter. During his 2024 U.S. presidential campaign, Donald Trump said that his father had told him never to say the word "Nazi" or mention Adolf Hitler. (Note: Comedian Stephen Colbert suggested that Fred had only meant that the dictator's name should not be taken in vain and that the Trumps had family in Argentina.)
