= Tillie (murals) =

Murals in Asbury Park, New Jersey

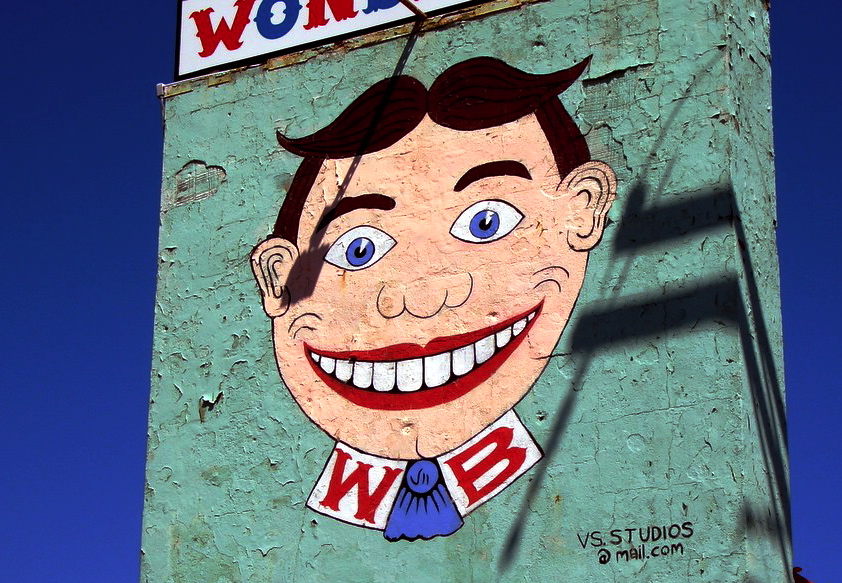
- Year: 1956
- Location: Asbury Park, United States; 40°13′04″N 74°00′11″W

Tillie as painted on the Palace Amusements building

Tillie is the nickname of two murals of a grinning figure that were painted on the side of the Palace Amusements building in Asbury Park, New Jersey, United States. Tillie is an amusement park "fun face", painted during the winter of 1955–1956. The name Tillie is likely a nod to George C. Tilyou, owner of Steeplechase Park in Coney Island, New York, which featured the Steeplechase Face, similar grinning face signage.

== In popular culture ==
Tillie has inspired various products, such as a soda brand. The mural has been featured in movies, Weird NJ magazine, TV shows such as The Sopranos, and a famous photo of Bruce Springsteen and the E Street Band early in their career.

== Saving of Tillie ==
Like many other boardwalk areas in the United States, such as Coney Island, New York, Asbury Park fell on hard times. Palace Amusements was built in 1888 and closed in 1988 with the historic building falling into disrepair. When the Palace site was targeted for demolition and redevelopment, Asbury Park residents, Tillie fans, and Springsteen fans formed a grassroots effort to save Tillie. The group lobbied the state to block the demolition or at least remove the mural beforehand. The effort was partially successful, as the left-side Tillie, as well as the "bumper girl" murals, were removed. The right-side Tillie was demolished. From June 8 to June 11, 2004, Save Tillie volunteers removed the mural from the Palace building. The building was demolished in July 2004. Tillie and other murals from the Palace building were to be incorporated into a new building on the site. The two wall sections with the Tillie mural are currently stored in Asbury Park; the version on the Wonder Bar at Ocean Avenue is a replica.

== Present-day history ==
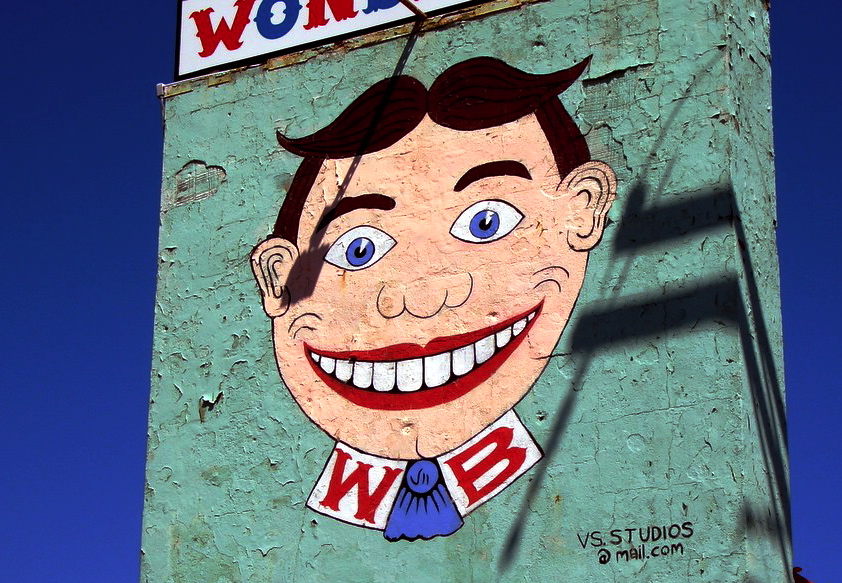
Tribute to Tillie on the Wonder Bar, Asbury Park, New Jersey

After being saved from demolition, Tillie was put in a shed at the city's wastewater treatment plant while it was decided what was to happen to the mural. It was left in the shed, which was battered by weather and became run-down, letting paint flake off the mural.

On September 28, 2021, Tillie was brought out of storage for the first time in 17 years and sat outside Paramount Theatre before being moved elsewhere.

== See also ==
- Asbury Park, New Jersey
- Palace Amusements
- Steeplechase Face
