= J. Lehrenkrauss Corporation =

The J. Lehrenkrauss Corporation was a Brooklyn, New York-based company which became insolvent in 1934.

== History ==
On January 25, 1935, Julius Lehrenkrauss, the 67-year-old head of the firm, was convicted of mail fraud in the sale of $1,600,000 of preferred stock. Its failure happened during the Great Depression when credit lending agencies were strained due to deflation and a weak economy in the United States in the early 1930s. Government prosecutors alleged that the business was bankrupt in 1932 and 1933, at the time the stock was sold. Lehrenkrauss received a suspended sentence because of his advanced age. Two partners and a former salesman for the firm were given active prison terms.

The hearing at the Brooklyn federal courthouse on January 15, 1934, was attended by over 3,000 people—more than ten times its capacity. The gathering was featured on the front page of the next day's Brooklyn Eagle, which said it was the largest courthouse crowd the borough had ever seen. Because J. Lehrenkrauss & Sons, the organization's mortgage-servicing subsidiary (located at 359 Fulton Street) was still actively making money, it would be sold in order to manage claims. Real estate developer Fred Trump attended the hearing, and acquired the mortgage-servicing subsidiary with a partner. This gave Trump access to the titles of many properties nearing foreclosure, which he bought at low cost and sold for a profit.
