= Palace Amusements =

- Previously known as Palace Merry-Go-Round
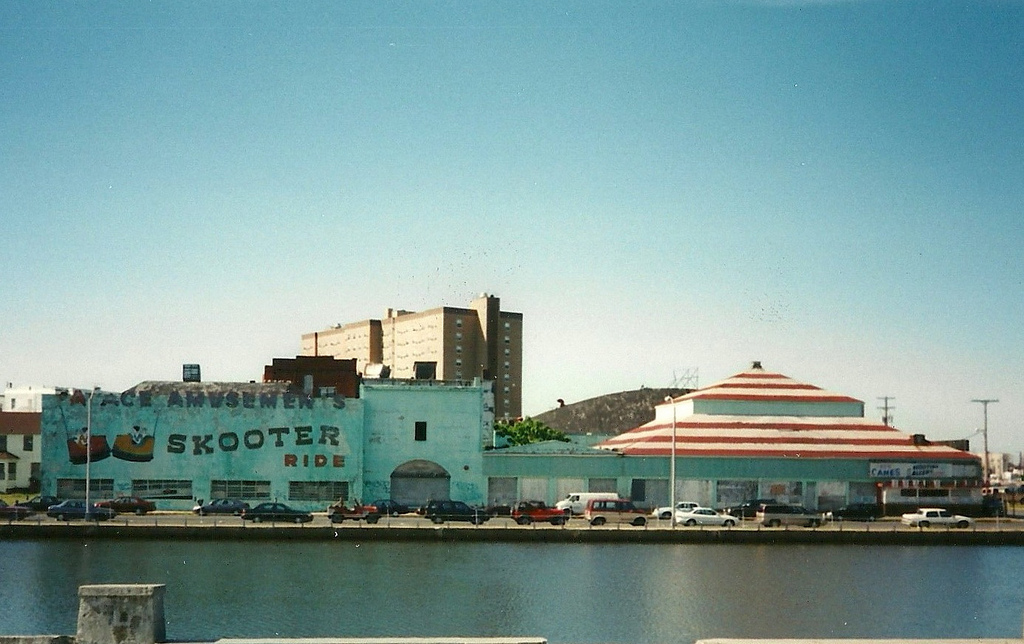
- Palace Amusements in 1997
- Interactive map of Palace Amusements
- Location: Asbury Park, NJ
- Status: Defunct
- Opened: August 17, 1888
- Closed: November 27, 1988
- Owner: Ernest Schnitzler (1888–1920); August Williams (1920–1939); Edward Lange & Zimel Resnick (1939–1986); Sam & Henry Vaccaro (1986–1988)
- Theme: Indoor amusement park
- Area: 0.9 acres (0.36 ha)

Attractions
- Total: 12
- Roller coasters: 1
- Water rides: 1

- Palace Amusements
- U.S. National Register of Historic Places
- New Jersey Register of Historic Places
- Location within Monmouth County, New Jersey
- Location: Asbury Park, New Jersey
- Coordinates: 40°13′4″N 74°0′12.76″W
- Built: June 1888
- Built by: Ernest Schnitzler
- Architect: Ernest Schnitzler; William B. Stout
- Architectural style: Late Victorian
- Demolished: May 26, 2004
- NRHP reference No.: 00001406
- NJRHP No.: 3705

Significant dates
- Added to NRHP: November 22, 2000
- Designated NJRHP: October 12, 2000

Palace Amusements was a historical indoor amusement park in Asbury Park, New Jersey. It was built in 1888 and expanded several times over its history, but after a worsening economic situation in both Asbury and the country in the mid-1980s, it went out of business in 1988.

Several efforts were made to save the structure, including its hand-carved carousel, murals and decorations, but in 2004, after an independent structural inspection, the building was deemed unsafe (it had already been damaged in several areas) and was ordered demolished. A local grassroots organization was able to save several pieces from the building, including the famed Tillie mural.

== Bruce Springsteen ==
The Palace is mentioned in 1974 Bruce Springsteen hit "Born to Run" in the lines "Beyond the Palace, hemi-powered drones / Scream down the boulevard".

== See also ==
- National Register of Historic Places listings in Monmouth County, New Jersey
