= Abilis =

American nonprofit for people with disabilities

Abilis is an American nonprofit organization based in Greenwich, Connecticut, that services clients with developmental disabilities of all ages. It matches their clients with a variety of services, including home therapists, extracurricular programming, and jobs. As of 2013, it manages group housing for about 100 adults. As of 2024, it provides services and support to more than 800 people with disabilities and their families. It has conducted at least two golf fundraisers with Fred Trump III, the nephew of United States President Donald Trump. The American-Canadian actor Brendan Fraser has also been a significant supporter of the organization, particularly with their yearly Dancing Stars of Greenwich charity event.

Abilis is headquartered at 50 Glenville St. in Greenwich as of 2024. Amy Montimurro is the president and CEO of Abilis.

== History ==
Abilis was founded in 1951.

In February 2024, the Cohen Foundation gave a $3.78 million grant to Abilis that would allow them to purchase the 78 Harvard Ave. building in Stamford, Connecticut, which was owned by 78 Harvard Associates, LLC, an affiliate of Baywater Properties, at the time. Baywater was to renovate the building before selling it to Abilis, who would rename it the Cohen Abilis Advancement Center. Given that Abilis already had a location in Stamford at 1150 Summer St. used for therapeutic services, this would be their second location in Stamford.
