= Fred Trump Jr. =

Brother of Donald Trump (1938–1981)

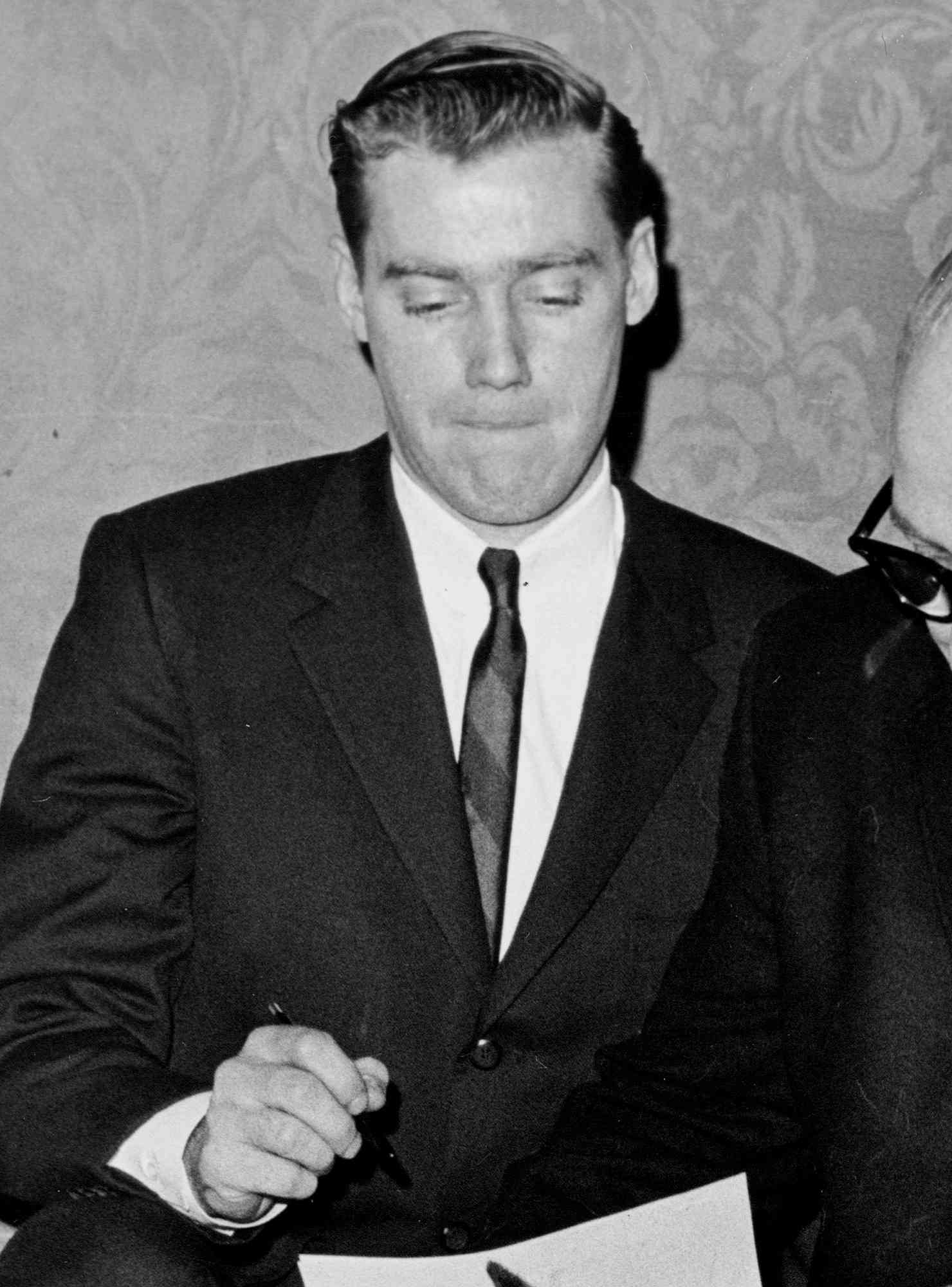
- Trump in 1966
- Born: Frederick Crist Trump Jr. October 14, 1938; Queens, New York City, U.S.
- Died: September 26, 1981 (aged 42); Queens, New York City, U.S.
- Burial place: All Faiths Cemetery, Queens, New York City
- Other name: Freddy Trump
- Education: Lehigh University (BA)
- Occupations: Pilot; maintenance worker
- Spouse: Linda Clapp (m. 1962)
- Children: Fred III; Mary
- Parents: Fred Trump; Mary Anne MacLeod Trump
- Family: Trump

Frederick Crist Trump Jr. (Note: Middle name pronounced /krɪst/, rhyming with "fist".) (October 14, 1938 – September 26, 1981) was an American airplane pilot and maintenance worker. The eldest son of real-estate businessman Fred Trump Sr., he fell out of his father's favor and became an airline pilot instead of taking over the family business, leading to his younger brother Donald Trump taking over the business instead. According to his daughter Mary, both Fred Sr. and Donald disparaged Fred Jr. for this decision. By the early 1970s, he could no longer function as a pilot due to his alcoholism, a condition that also contributed to his fatal heart attack at the age of 42.

Both of his children, Fred Trump III and Mary L. Trump, eventually became vocal critics of Donald Trump and his presidency.

== Early life ==
Frederick Crist Trump Jr. was born on October 14, 1938, the first son of real-estate developer Fred Trump Sr. and Mary Anne MacLeod Trump in Queens, New York City. In 1956, Trump graduated from St. Paul's School, a college preparatory academy for boys. That year, his father, Fred Trump Sr., donated money to have the playing fields redone, which were renamed Trump Field in his honor.

Trump attended Lehigh University and joined a historically Jewish fraternity, Sigma Alpha Mu, although he was not Jewish. (Note: Fred Jr. has been quoted, reputedly via his fraternity brothers, as saying his father was Jewish.) In 2018, psychoanalyst Justin A. Frank asserted that Trump joined the fraternity to rebel against his father, who Frank alleged was antisemitic. In 2020, Trump's daughter Mary L. Trump also asserted her grandfather was antisemitic. Trump became president of the fraternity and graduated with a Bachelor of Arts in business, also completing Reserve Officers' Training Corps and entering the Air National Guard as a second lieutenant.

== Middle life and career ==
In 1958, Trump met Linda Clapp while vacationing in the Bahamas. She later became a flight attendant and asked him for help finding an apartment near Idlewild Airport; they soon began dating. He proposed to her in 1961. In early 1962, they were married in Florida, and she resigned from the airline, which did not allow its flight attendants to be married. They settled in Manhattan and had their first child, Fred Trump III, in November 1962. The next year, they moved into one of Fred Trump Sr.'s apartments in Jamaica, Queens. During this time, Trump did maintenance jobs on his father's properties.

His father wanted him to be "invulnerable" so he could take over his real-estate business, E. Trump & Son (which became the Trump Organization), and for which Trump was ill-suited. In 1966, Trump was listed in newspapers as vice president of the company, but he had a difficult time working with his father. That same year, Fred Jr. left the company to pursue his dream of being a pilot, quickly being accepted at Trans World Airlines, which created tension with his father. According to Trump's daughter Mary, her grandfather "dismantled him by devaluing and degrading every aspect of his personality." She said that Fred Trump Sr. and Donald Trump mocked him for his decision to become an airline pilot, comparing it to being a bus driver or chauffeur.

== Alcoholism and death ==
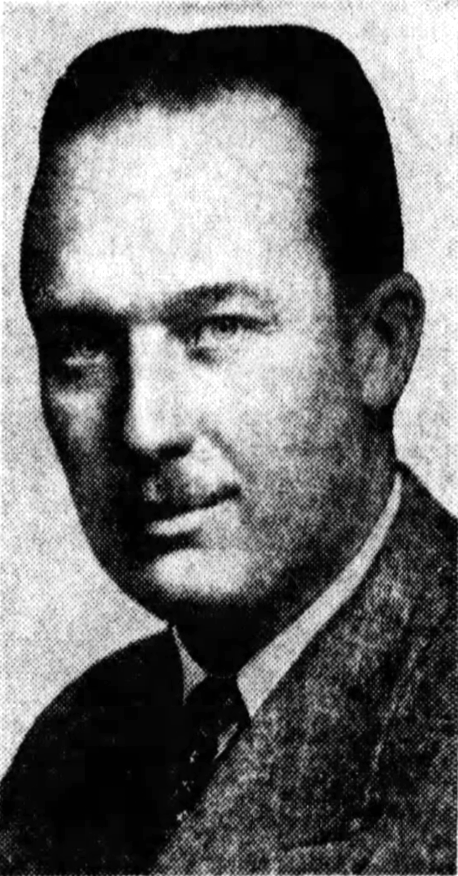
Fred Trump Sr. c. 1950

By 1970, after a series of domestic incidents, Clapp asked Trump to leave their home and arranged for Fred Sr. to change the locks. When his alcoholism prevented him from continuing to function as a pilot, Trump returned to work for his father's business. He eventually moved into the unfurnished attic of his parents' house and again did maintenance on Trump properties. On September 26, 1981, at the age of 42, he died from a heart attack caused by his alcohol use. (Note: His death certificate states that he died on September 29 of "natural causes".)

=== Aftermath ===
Donald Trump, who since 1976 has spoken publicly of his own abstinence from alcohol, initially cited the formative influence of their father's teetotalism, but also included experience with his brother, saying:

"Every day he lectured me, 'Look at the mess I'm in. If I ever catch you smoking, you'll be sorry, drinking even a glass of booze because you'll like it too much.' ...Freddy did a good job."

On March 16, 1994, Trump's mother stated in an interview with Irish broadcaster Bibi Baskin that "We lost a son, our oldest son. He was 41. Something a mother never forgets." (Note: He was actually 42 at the time of his death.)

In 2019, Donald Trump said about his brother's death:

"I do regret having put pressure on him [as running the family business] was just something he was never going to want. ... It was just not his thing. ... I think the mistake that we [Donald and Fred Sr.] made was we assumed that everybody would like it [running the business]. That would be the biggest mistake. ...what he loved doing was flying airplanes."

== In popular culture ==
- Fred Trump Jr. is played by Charlie Carrick in the 2024 biopic The Apprentice.
