= Steeplechase Face =

Mascot of Steeplechase Park, New York City

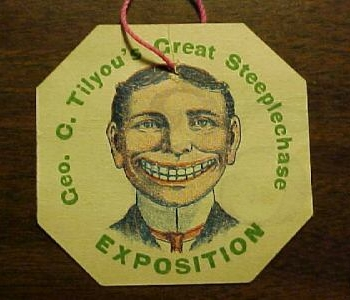
1905 ticket for a Steeplechase ride

The Steeplechase Face was the mascot of the historic Steeplechase Park, the first of three amusement parks in Coney Island, Brooklyn, New York. It remains a nostalgic symbol of Coney Island and of amusement areas influenced by it. It features a man with a wide, exaggerated smile which sometimes bears as many as 44 visible teeth. The image conveys simple fun, but was also observed by cultural critics to have an undercurrent of Victorian-era repressed sexuality.

It was also known as the Funny Face after the park's slogan "Steeplechase – Funny Place" or as Tillie, after the park's founder George C. Tilyou. It has also sometimes been named Steeplechase Jack. The mascot represented the area's wholesomeness and neoclassical architecture combined with its veneer of hidden sexuality. Though the park was a "family-friendly" area, it was nearby the "freer sexual expression of the dance halls, beaches, and boardwalk."

The "Funny Face" logo has become an iconic symbol of Coney Island.

== History ==
Introduced in 1897 with the park's opening, it existed in a variety of forms for most of its history, and was only standardized as a design in the late 1940s.

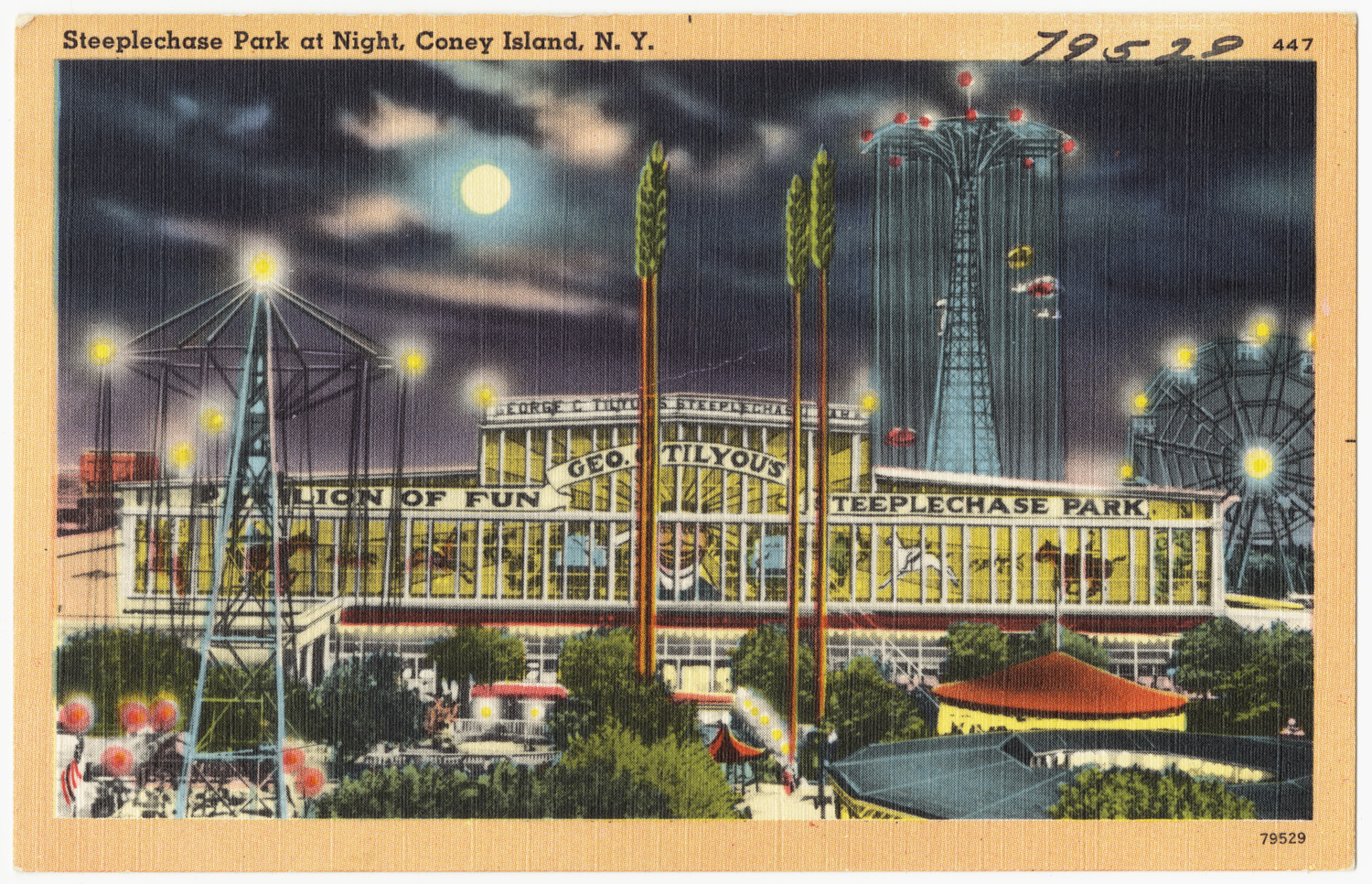
Pavilion of Fun, c. 1930 postcard

The face's most prominent appearance in Coney Island was in glass on the exterior of Steeplechase's Pavilion of Fun, created when the park was rebuilt in 1909. In 1966, real estate developer Fred Trump destroyed the park in an unsuccessful attempt to create condos on the site. During the demolition, Trump handed out bricks to the public, encouraging visitors to throw them at the glass Steeplechase Face.

== Impact ==
The smile of the Joker, a Batman villain, may have been partially inspired by the face. The face is sometimes seen as an evil clown today, but this was not the original understanding.

The face also appeared at other Tilyou amusement properties, such as Steeplechase Pier in Atlantic City, and was also copied regionally, as with the Tillie of Asbury Park.

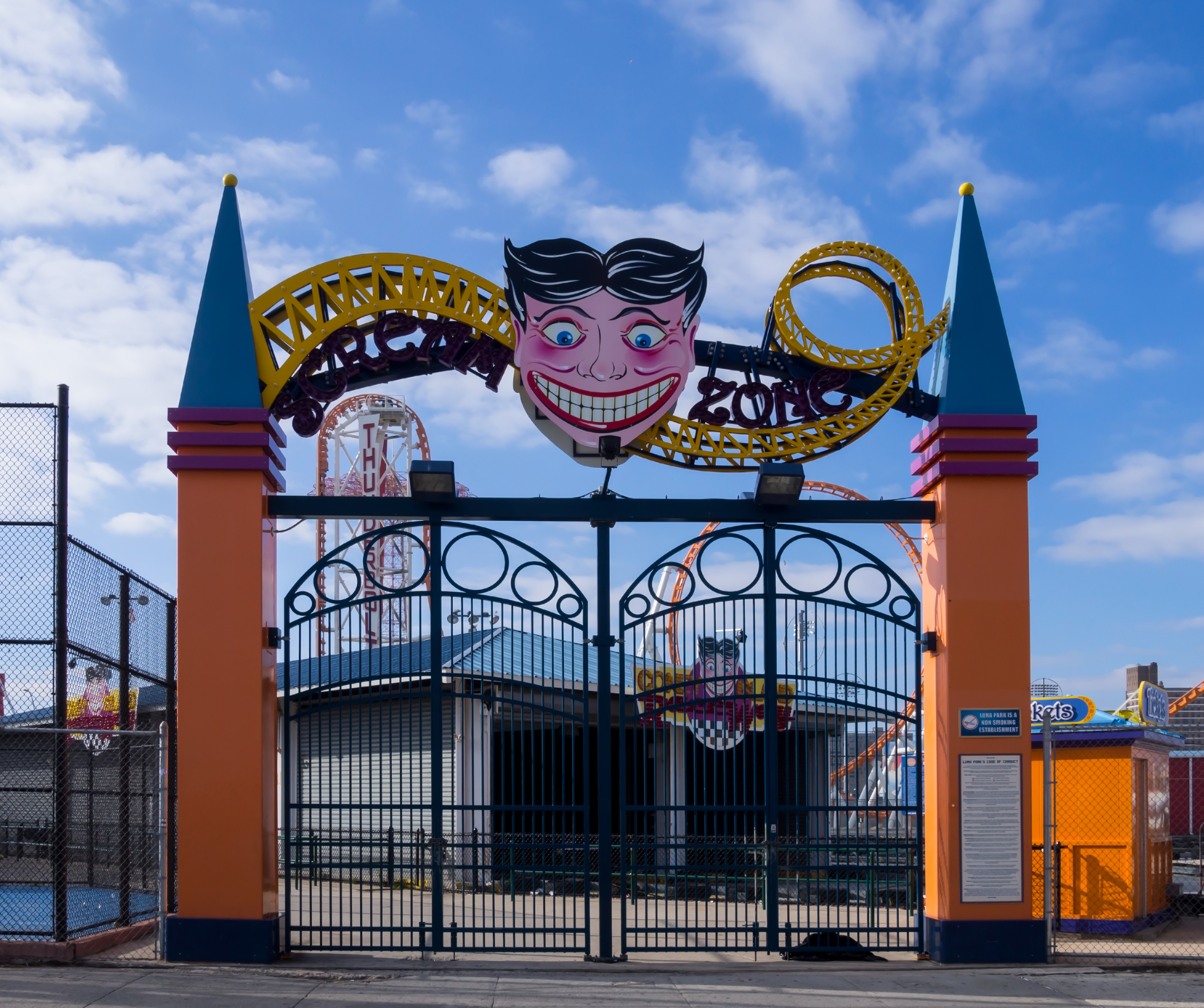
Entrance to the "Scream Zone," 2016

The face remains a popular symbol of Coney Island, embraced by many neighborhood institutions and businesses. A version is used in the logo of Coney Island USA, and for a time another, more clown-like, version was used by Coney Island Brewing Co. It is used in parts of the modern Luna Park, particularly in its "Scream Zone".

As of 2019, the Steeplechase Face continues to appear as sticker art in Coney Island.

An exhibit on the history of the face was shown by the Coney Island History Project in 2014. An exhibit on Coney Island's history, which included artifacts of the face, was displayed at the Brooklyn Museum in 2015.

== See also ==
- Tillie (murals)
- Alfred E. Neuman
- Mickey Mouse, mascot of The Walt Disney Company
