= Bush on the Couch =

2002 book exploring the mind of then-U.S. president George W. Bush

- US cover of Bush on the Couch
- Author: Justin Frank
- Cover artist: Rodrigo Corral Design
- Language: English
- Subject: George W. Bush, psychoanalysis
- Genre: Non-fiction
- Publisher: Regan Books
- Publication date: 2004
- Publication place: United States
- Pages: 247 pp
- ISBN: 0-06-073670-4
- OCLC: 55650417
- Dewey Decimal: 973.931/092 B 22
- LC Class: E903.3 .F73 2004

Bush on the Couch: Inside the Mind of the President is a 2004 book by psychoanalyst Justin A. Frank. The central premise of Frank's book is that President George W. Bush displays signs of poor mental health which makes him ill-suited to rule the United States. Frank suggests Bush suffers from megalomania, that he is probably incapable of true compassion and shows signs of sadism, and that as an untreated alcoholic, is in constant danger of a relapse. Further, in Frank's opinion, Bush manifests the symptoms of a "dry drunk", principally irritability, judgmentalism and a rigid, inflexible world view. Frank also analyses, among other things, Bush's tendency to mix up his metaphors and concludes Bush has substantial problems with abstract, flexible thinking.

An updated version of the book was released in October 2007, including a new introduction and a new afterword.

== Critical analysis of the book ==
Bush on the Couch has received endorsements from such distinguished professors of psychiatry as Irvin Yalom of Stanford University and James Grotstein (UCLA), who calls it a "remarkable – and frightening – piece of careful scholarship."

Frank's book also has its detractors. Writing for the conservative magazine The Weekly Standard, Irwin Savodnik, a psychiatrist who teaches at the University of California, Los Angeles, described Frank's book as a "psychoanalytic hatchet job" and said that "there is not an ounce of psychoanalytic material in the entire book." The code of the American Psychiatric Association, of which Frank is not a current member, states that "it is unethical for a psychiatrist to offer a professional opinion unless he or she has conducted an examination and has been granted proper authorization for such a statement." Although Frank had in the past written for Salon, the online magazine reviewed the book unfavorably, arguing that it included "dubious theories" and that Frank had failed in his avowed intention to distinguish his partisan opinions from his psychoanalytic evaluation of Bush's character.

However, in interviews Frank freely admits his partisan affiliation, but claims his book is in a tradition of psychological assessments of leaders frequently undertaken, for example, by the CIA. Frank also claims that some of his readers have reacted to his book by gaining increased sympathy for Bush; for example, Joan Baez admitted this to Frank.

== Reviews ==
- History News Network Review
- Shrinking the President: A mind is a dangerous thing to psychoanalyze, The Weekly Standard, September 19, 2004
- Miller, Laura (June 16, 2004). "The inner W". Salon. Archived from the original on October 11, 2012.
- Don Sloan (2003-10-03). "Book Review – Bush on the Couch, by Justin Frank". Political Affairs. Archived from the original on 2016-03-27.

== Impact ==
Frank's book Bush on the Couch: Inside the Mind of the President was extensively quoted from by Fidel Castro in his annual speech in 2004.

== See also ==
- The Dangerous Case of Donald Trump
