= Fred Trump III =

American author and nephew of Donald Trump (born 1962)

- Born: Frederick Crist Trump III; November 15, 1962 (age 64); Manhattan, New York City, U.S.
- Education: Lehigh University
- Political party: Democratic
- Spouse: Lisa Beth Lorant
- Children: 3
- Father: Fred Trump Jr.
- Family: Trump family

Frederick Crist Trump III (born November 15, 1962) is an American author, real estate executive, and advocate for people with disabilities. His son William Trump has a rare KCNQ2 mutation that results in severe disability. He is a nephew of U.S. President Donald Trump and is best known for his allegations against his uncle in his 2024 memoir, All in the Family: The Trumps and How We Got This Way.

In his memoir, Trump wrote that his uncle, Donald Trump, has made multiple ableist, racist, and dehumanizing comments throughout his life, one of which concerned William Trump.

== Early life and education ==
Frederick Crist Trump III was born in Manhattan, New York City, on November 15, 1962, to flight attendant Linda Lea Clapp and Fred Trump Jr., a commercial airline pilot of Trans World Airlines and a son of real estate developer Fred Trump. His younger sister, Mary L. Trump, is a psychologist and writer who has similarly criticized Donald Trump. Trump's father died of a heart attack on September 26, 1981, when he was 42 years old and when Trump was 18 years old. The Trump family claimed that his death was a result of his alcoholism. Trump graduated from Lehigh University in 1984 with a bachelor's degree in economics.

== Adult life ==
Trump married Lisa Beth Trump (née Lorant) – a senior underwriter for a New York-based insurance company – on September 16, 1989, and they have had three children. Trump's eldest two children were born healthy. His third and youngest child, William Trump, was born on June 30, 1999. William appeared healthy immediately after birth, but started having seizures within 24 hours, requiring Trump and his wife to spend the first six weeks of William's life at hospitals. At the time, William was diagnosed with infantile spasms and cerebral palsy, but he was diagnosed with a KCNQ2 mutation 15 years later.

After his grandfather Fred Trump died in 1999, Trump and his sister, Mary L. Trump, sued Donald Trump and two of his three living siblings, Maryanne Trump Barry and Robert Trump, in March 2000. During the lawsuit, they claimed that they were being unfairly denied their inheritance, as they were told that they would only receive a portion of what they had expected. Donald Trump and his siblings eventually responded by financially withdrawing from William Trump's medical funds, a response that Donald Trump later admitted was an act of revenge to the New York Daily News. The dispute was settled in 2001, and the details of the agreement have been kept private due to a confidentiality agreement.

== Career ==
Trump is a real estate executive who has worked at multiple different firms, including the First Winthrop Corporation, a New York real estate company. He has worked in a number of positions, including as an associate, a leasing broker, a managing principal, and a senior director. He has also worked as an executive director for Cushman & Wakefield, an American real estate firm that handled the leasing of properties for The Trump Organization until the January 6 United States Capitol attack, which caused their business relations to cease and Trump to be asked to leave the firm. He had worked for the firm for nearly four years before being asked to leave. Trump has never directly worked for The Trump Organization.

== Advocacy ==
Trump has hosted at least two golf fundraisers for Greenwich-based nonprofit organization Abilis, which matches disabled clients, particularly those with developmental disabilities, with resources such as therapy and manages group housing. Abilis had provided in-home therapy visits for Trump's disabled son William prior to the fundraisers.

During the first presidency of Donald Trump, Trump met with the Trump administration and the President's Committee for People with Intellectual Disabilities to advocate for a number of specific investments to help people with disabilities. Trump also had connections with the United States Department of Health and Human Services during that time, and says that he has visited the Oval Office around a dozen times for a variety of reasons, mainly to advocate for people with disabilities.

In his 2024 memoir, Trump criticized societal perception of people with disabilities as "less than in so many ways" and the persistent societal barriers against them, such as doorways that cannot accommodate wheelchairs and difficulty in finding meaningful day programs. He added that he believes that acceptance and tolerance will only come with public education and awareness.

On November 30, 2025, three days after Donald Trump referred to Minnesota governor Tim Walz as "seriously retarded" on TruthSocial, he criticized Donald Trump on X for his use of the word. He claimed that it was never acceptable to use and harmful to those with disabilities.

== Memoir ==
On July 30, 2024, during Donald Trump's campaign in the 2024 United States presidential election, Trump published a memoir titled All in the Family: The Trumps and How We Got This Way. The memoir details his experiences with his uncle Donald Trump and his grandfather Fred Trump.

=== Allegations against Donald Trump ===
In the memoir and interviews regarding it, Trump claimed that Donald Trump, in response to his request to refill his disabled son William's medical fund, told him to let William die instead, claiming that William does not recognize him and that he should move to Florida afterward. According to Trump, Donald Trump has never met William. He also claimed that Donald Trump made a similar remark in May 2020 that was generalized to say that all people with complex disabilities should die due to their expenses, and that he used the N-word twice in one day after his car's tires were slashed. Trump explicitly stated that, while he does not believe that his uncle is a racist, he does believe that he uses people as if they were props and will "cast them aside" when he gets what he desires out of them.

Trump has stated that he still wishes to have a relationship with his uncle, emphasizing that "he's family, and that means a lot". Trump also added that, while he does not believe that he or anyone else could change his uncle, he has always enjoyed spending time with him.

=== Reception ===
Donald Trump's campaign communications director, Steven Cheung, denied these allegations, calling them "completely fabricated", "blatantly disgusting", and "total fake news of the highest order". He claimed that anyone who personally knows Donald Trump would be aware that he would "never use such language", and that false stories like Trump's have been thoroughly debunked. Trump maintains that his allegations are not fabricated and have occurred. Donald Trump's son Eric Trump responded through a representative to Entertainment Weekly that it was disappointing that Trump decided to "cash in" less than 100 days before an election and publish his allegations after extensive support and money from the Trump family.

Donald Trump personally responded to Trump's allegations in a statement to The Washington Post, claiming that he has helped Trump more than anyone else in his life, only to get allegations in return. He added that he believes Trump's sister, Mary L. Trump, convinced him to make the allegations. Trump claimed that he has not spoken to Mary since she published her 2020 book that similarly criticized Donald Trump, Too Much and Never Enough, nor has he read her book.

== Politics ==
Trump is a Democrat. He has publicly disapproved of the overturning of Roe v Wade. He has never voted for his uncle Donald Trump. He voted for Hillary Clinton in the 2016 United States presidential election and Joe Biden in the 2020 United States presidential election, but had not been a vocal critic of his uncle until the publication of his memoir. He endorsed Kamala Harris for president in 2024, stating that he was willing to campaign against Donald Trump "without hesitation" and speak at the Democratic National Convention if he was asked. He stated that he was willing to attend Donald Trump's inauguration if his uncle won the election and if he was invited.

On January 26, 2025, six days after the second inauguration of Donald Trump, Trump stated that the stripping of security details for United Nations Ambassador John Bolton and COVID-19 expert Anthony Fauci was not surprising to him and should not be surprising to anybody, claiming that Donald Trump will "go after" anyone who does not support him. He praised Fauci, saying that he had "done great work for this country", but added that his tenure did not "work out" for Donald Trump. He encouraged the Democratic Party to "get some spine and stop the whine", adding that the party needed a strong leader to "fight back" against Donald Trump before the next election cycle, as it would be too late by that point.

In March 2025, Trump critiqued the upcoming budget plan that would eventually lead to the 2025 United States federal government shutdown, claiming that the cuts to Medicaid would be devastating for his disabled son, William, as well as for "tens of millions of people like William", and accused the cuts of lacking "humanity and decency". In June 2025, Trump raised concerns about Donald Trump's mental health, claiming that Donald Trump's behavior at the time paralleled the behavior of his family members such as Fred Trump Sr. before their diagnoses of Alzheimer's disease. He added that his uncle used to be able to "stick to a message" but had lost the ability to do so.

== Personal life ==
Trump lives with his wife, Lisa Beth Trump, in Connecticut, and they have three children together. His youngest child William has a rare KCNQ2 mutation, resulting in physical and mental disabilities as well as a seizure disorder, requiring a lifetime of care. William is nonverbal and uses a wheelchair. He has been living in a group home about 20 minutes from his parents' home for "the last couple years [sic]", according to Trump in 2025. William attended Central Middle School as a child, and reportedly enjoyed ice cream, swimming, peanut butter sandwiches, and reggae at that point in his life.

Trump's uncle, Donald Trump, has given him significant financial assistance to aid with William's care. In September 2024, Trump claimed that a spokesperson for his uncle alerted him a few weeks prior that William's medical fund had been dissolved.
