= George C. Tilyou =

American entrepreneur and showman

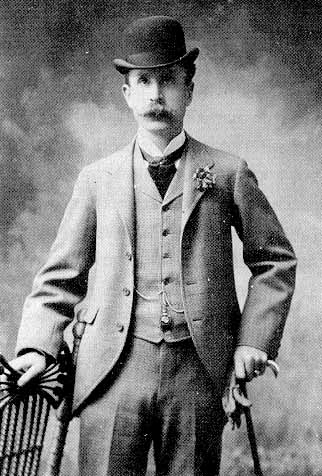
George C. Tilyou

George Cornelius Tilyou (1862–1914) was an American entrepreneur and showman who founded New York City's Steeplechase Park. He was born in New York City to parents who had operated businesses in Coney Island from his early childhood. He founded Steeplechase in 1897, and rebuilt it entirely after a 1907 fire. Tilyou died in 1914, leaving the park to his children, who continued to operate it until 1964.

== Early life ==
George Cornelius Tilyou was born on February 3, 1862, in New York City. His parents were hotel proprietor Peter Tilyou and Ellen Mahoney Tilyou. In 1865 when Tilyou was three years old, the family moved to Coney Island in Brooklyn, which then was outside New York City limits. After their relocation, his family started operating a popular Coney Island restaurant called the Surf House. Peter Tilyou offered free clam chowder bowls to guests who purchased a 25-cent ticket to bathe at the Coney Island Beach.

== Early career ==
Tilyou's first business venture was in 1876, at the age of fourteen, when he sold boxes of Coney Island sand and salt water to unwitting tourists for 25 cents each, earning $13.45 in the process. By the time he was seventeen, he owned beachfront property on Coney Island. Tilyou also began to publish a four-page newspaper entitled Tilyou's Telephone. A history of Coney Island from the 1940s noted that "Tilyou's Telephone managed to give a rather well-rounded picture of life at the resort in the late 1880s". Tilyou also invested in stagecoaches and real estate.

In 1882, when he was twenty, George and Peter Tilyou opened Tilyou's Surf Theater, Coney Island's first theater. The area outside the theater became known as "Bowery Street", after the Bowery, a notorious neighborhood in Manhattan. By 1887, Tilyou was dealing primarily in real estate; at the time, crime and corruption in Coney Island were prevalent. When Tilyou testified against John Y. McKane, one of the leaders of the corruption, he faced constant harassment until McKane was arrested in 1894.

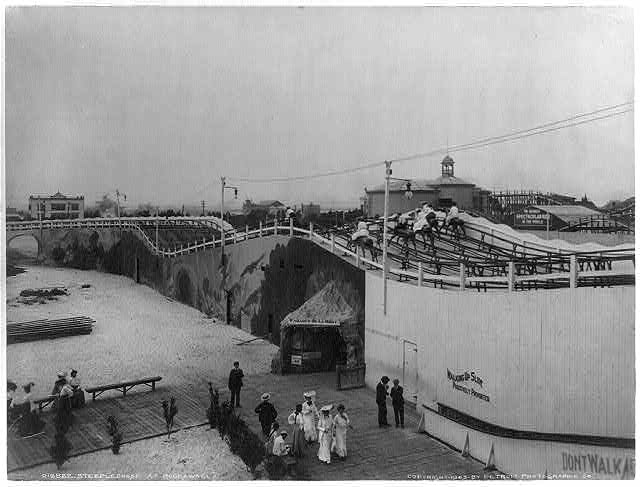
The steeplechase ride

Tilyou married Mary O'Donnell in 1893, and they went to visit the World's Columbian Exposition in Chicago for their honeymoon. Tilyou wanted to buy the fair's 250-foot-diameter (76 m) Ferris wheel, which contained 36 cars that could each fit 60 passengers. However, that attraction had already been sold, so he built a half-size version on Coney Island at Surf Avenue. Tilyou's Ferris wheel, erroneously dubbed the "World's Largest Ferris Wheel", contained 12 cars each with a capacity of 18 passengers. The attraction became one of the most popular on Coney Island, and Tilyou began adding other rides and attractions, which at first operated separately.

== Steeplechase Park ==
In the late 1890s, Tilyou bought and improved the Steeplechase Horses ride, an attraction by J.W. Cawdry that featured gravity-pulled mechanical horses racing along metal tracks. Steeplechase Park opened in 1897 with the completion of the Steeplechase Horses attraction. The park covered 15 acres (6.1 ha), two-thirds of which Tilyou owned outright, at the western end of Bowery Street. The park's attractions included the Human Niagara, a Venetian gondola-style ride, the Aerial Racing Slide, the Double-Dip Chutes, the Bicycle Railway, a "French Voyage" panorama, and a Wild West sideshow. Also in the park were a small steam railroad, a saltwater pool, a ballroom, and the Scenic Railroad coaster by LaMarcus Thompson, as well as scale models of world landmarks.

In the early morning of July 29, 1907, a fire started within the Cave of the Winds attraction and destroyed much of the park. Firefighters fought to save Tilyou's house at the corner of Steeplechase Park. Even though the fire destroyed nearly everything within Steeplechase Park, Tilyou reportedly remained calm throughout, even promising to host events that had been planned within the park before the fire. Seeking to make the best of the fire's effects, Tilyou offered admission to the burning ruins for ten cents. The remaining attractions opened one week after the fire. The reconstruction of Steeplechase Park was completed in 1909.

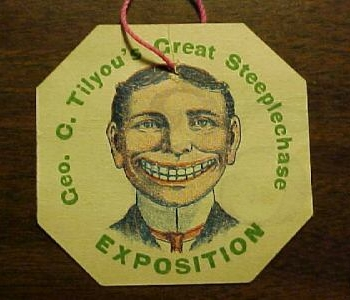
Admissions ticket for Steeplechase Park from 1905 with the "Funny Face" mascot

Steeplechase Park's icon was a "Funny Face" mascot, depicting a smiling man with several dozen teeth; it was nicknamed "the Tilly" after Tilyou's surname. The mascot, which became a symbol of Coney Island, represented the area's wholesomeness and neoclassical architecture combined with its veneer of hidden sexuality. Tilyou was also involved in the operation of numerous amusement parks in the northeastern United States. Tilyou built parks in Rockaway Beach, New York; Atlantic City, New Jersey; Asbury Park, New Jersey; Revere Beach, Massachusetts; St. Louis, Missouri; and San Francisco, California.

== Personal life ==
George Tilyou and Mary O'Donnell (1869–1954) had six children. Five of them lived to adulthood.

- Edward F. Tilyou (1896–1944)
- Marie H. Tilyou (1898–1977)
- George Cornelius Tilyou Jr. (1902–1958)
- Eileen T. McAllister (1904–1967)
- Frank Sheridan Tilyou (1908–1964)

Tilyou died at his Park Slope mansion on November 30, 1914, the home of his last two years at 37 Prospect Park West. He was 52 years old. Tilyou had suffered from congestive heart failure after contracting the common cold. He is interred at Green-Wood Cemetery in Brooklyn. After Tilyou's death, his oldest son Edward took over operation, and Steeplechase Park remained within the Tilyou family until it closed a half-century later. The Park Slope mansion was replaced by an Emery Roth luxury apartment building 15 years after Tilyou's death, with some family members occupying a grand penthouse at the new property. All of the Tilyou children had some role in operating the park during their respective lifetimes. The relationship between the siblings was fractious, and they often argued about Steeplechase's management. The park closed permanently in 1964.

== Legacy ==
In honor of Tilyou's role in developing Coney Island, in 2025 the City of New York designated an apartment development in the neighborhood under the name Tilyou Towers.
