= 1956 Arizona gubernatorial election =

- November 6, 1956
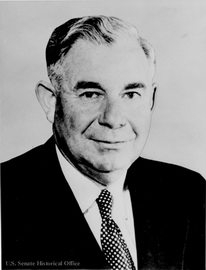

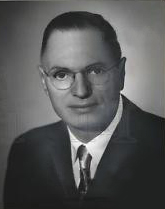
Nominee	Ernest McFarland	Horace B. Griffen
Party	Democratic	Republican
Popular vote	171,848	116,744
Percentage	59.55%	40.45%
- County results McFarland: 50–60% 60–70% 70–80%
Governor before election
Ernest McFarland
Democratic
Elected Governor
Ernest McFarland
Democratic

The 1956 Arizona gubernatorial election took place on November 6, 1956. Incumbent Governor Ernest McFarland ran for reelection to a second term. Ernest McFarland defeated longtime The Arizona Republic journalist and Republican nominee Horace B. Griffen in the general election by a wide margin.

== Democratic primary ==
=== Candidates ===
- Ernest McFarland, incumbent Governor

=== Results ===
Democratic primary results
Party	Candidate	Votes	%
Democratic	Ernest W. McFarland (incumbent)	116,924	100.00%
Total votes		116,924	100.00%

== Republican primary ==
=== Candidates ===
- Horace B. Griffen, The Arizona Republic journalist
- O. D. Miller, State Senator
- Fred Trump, U. S. Government Staff Consultant to the Anglo American Council on Productivity

=== Results ===
Republican primary results
Party	Candidate	Votes	%
Republican	Horace B. Griffen	20,471	45.97%
Republican	O. D. Miller	17,858	40.11%
Republican	Fred Trump	6,199	13.92%
Total votes		44,528	100.00%

== General election ==
=== Results ===
Arizona gubernatorial election, 1956 (Note: The Arizona State Library has digitized the original 1956 returns, but has not published them on AZ Memory, though it will provide a pdf upon request)
Party	Candidate	Votes	%	±%
Democratic	Ernest W. McFarland (incumbent)	171,848	59.55%	+7.04%
Republican	Horace B. Griffen	116,744	40.45%	−7.04%
Majority		55,104	19.09%	
Total votes		288,592	100.00%	
Democratic hold		Swing	+14.08%	

=== Results by county ===
County	Ernest W. McFarland Democratic		Horace B. Griffen Republican		Margin		Total votes cast
County	#	%	#	%	#	%	Total votes cast
Apache	1,693	63.79%	961	39.21%	732	27.58%	2,654
Cochise	8,601	71.18%	3,482	28.82%	5,119	42.37%	12,083
Coconino	3,840	60.42%	2,516	39.58%	1,324	20.83%	6,356
Gila	6,036	73.06%	2,226	26.94%	3,810	46.11%	8,262
Graham	2,655	66.89%	1,314	33.11%	1,341	33.79%	3,969
Greenlee	3,408	78.08%	957	21.92%	2,451	56.15%	4,365
Maricopa	79,404	54.38%	66,622	45.62%	12,782	8.75%	146,026
Mohave	1,706	68.35%	790	31.65%	916	36.70%	2,496
Navajo	3,472	58.36%	2,477	41.64%	995	16.73%	5,949
Pima	38,615	62.36%	23,310	37.64%	15,305	24.72%	61,925
Pinal	7,639	69.93%	3,285	30.07%	4,354	39.86%	10,924
Santa Cruz	2,018	73.52%	727	26.48%	1,291	47.03%	2,745
Yavapai	5,543	56.67%	4,238	43.33%	1,305	13.34%	9,781
Yuma	7,218	65.28%	3,839	34.72%	3,379	30.56%	11,057
Totals	171,848	59.55%	116,744	40.45%	55,104	19.09%	288,592

==== Counties that flipped from Republican to Democratic ====
- Maricopa
- Pima
- Yavapai
