= Fred Trump (politician) =

American politician (1913–1968)

- Trump in a 1956 political advertisement
- Born: Frederic John Trump; December 21, 1913; St. Paul, Minnesota, U.S.
- Died: February 17, 1968 (aged 54); Ogden, Utah, U.S.
- Known for: Candidate in 1956 Arizona gubernatorial election; Correspondence with Richard Nixon
- Political party: Republican
- Spouse: Julianne Schmahl (m. 1937)
- Children: 4
- Relatives: Trump family (alleged)

Frederic John Trump (December 21, 1913 – February 17, 1968) was a businessman and Republican candidate in the 1956 Arizona gubernatorial election. Between 1956 and 1960, he corresponded with then-vice president of the United States Richard Nixon. He was claimed to be a cousin of John G. Trump, brother of New York real-estate developer Fred Trump (the father of Donald Trump).

== Biography ==
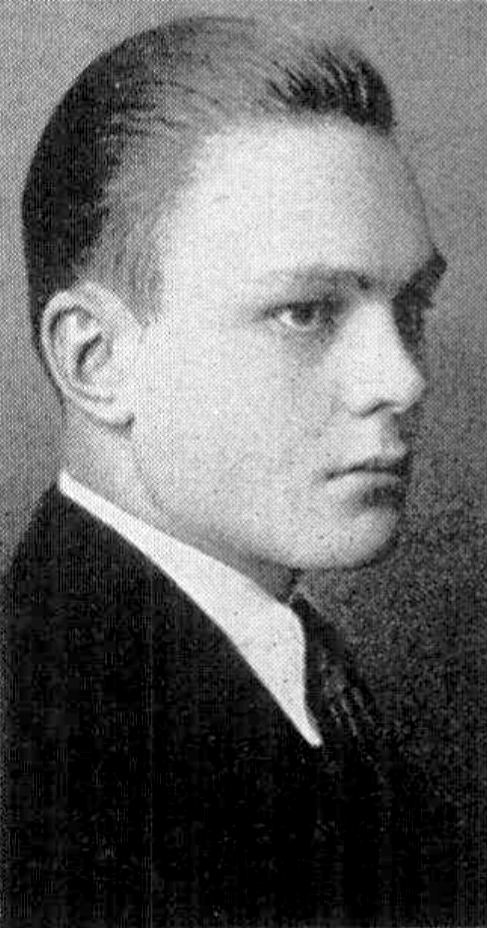
Trump as a high-school senior (1932)

Trump was born on December 21, 1913, in Saint Paul, Minnesota, to Frederic A. Trump and Myrtle VanBrunt Trump. (Note: He also had a brother named Paul Van Brunt.) He graduated from Saint Paul Central High School in 1932. He was married on February 11, 1937, in Los Angeles to Julianne Schmahl, (Note: Less strict spellings for Trump's wife's name include Julie, Julian, and Julieann.) the daughter of Republican Julius A. Schmahl, who served 24 terms as secretary of state and state treasurer of Minnesota. (Note: A political ad for Trump claims that his father-in-law was popularly known as "The Grand Old Man of the Grand Old Party", a moniker later applied to Arizona Senator Barry Goldwater and, retroactively, to 1930s governor of Kansas Alf Landon.) On Trump's 1938 California voter registration, his occupation was recorded as 'wholesaler'. By 1940, he and his wife were living back in St. Paul. In the 1940 census, he was recorded as owning and managing a cosmetics shop, named Cosmetics Inc. according to his draft registration of that year. He had three daughters, as well as a son named Fred Trump Jr. (July 17, 1956 – December 27, 2018).

By 1950, Trump had worked as a cowboy, newspaper reporter, manufacturer, and sales consultant, helping reorganize several firms. After prior government employment, Trump served as U.S. Government staff consultant to the Anglo-American Council on Productivity (AACP, fl. 1948–1952). (Note: In 1955, a Republican group of Trump supporters stated that [he] is not new to government service. After acceptance by the F.B.I. he was retained as one of the U.S. Government's top rated consultants, Staff Consultant to the Anglo American Council. There is no known connection to the Federal Bureau of Investigation. Rather, the United Kingdom's Federation of British Industries was connected to the AACP.) In the early 1950s, he visited Washington, D.C., to advocate for funds on behalf of the Grand Canyon's Shrine of the Ages Chapel, and was photographed with Vice President Richard Nixon. By 1952, Trump had done national publicity work for the Republican chapter of New York City and moved his family to Tucson, where he was the head of a million-dollar firm that produced pharmaceuticals for infants.

In 1953, an executive of Trump's companies brought a $37,500 lawsuit against him for his lawyer's failure to register $30,000 worth of stock before selling it to him, as well as Trump's having allegedly used deceptive methods to force the sale. Trump named his lawyer as third-party defendant, saying he should pay any charges brought against them. Trump countersued for over $90,000, arguing that the executive had conspired with both of their lawyers to damage him. By 1956, Trump was suing for $160,000, claiming the executive had illegally sold stock in the companies.

Trump polled at 46% in his state district for the 1952 election to the Arizona House of Representatives, ahead of any Republican, and in 1954, his nominating petition to run for U.S. senator was the largest ever filed by a member of his party in Pima County. In a 1955 letter of support for the position of Arizona governor to a Republican State Committee official, Trump was cited as sharing many of the views of Arizona Senator Barry Goldwater. In December 1955, Trump authored a newsletter to Arizona Republicans in promotion of his gubernatorial campaign; this included his photograph with Nixon from earlier in the decade to represent a visit from November. Major General Charles A. Willoughby wrote a March 1956 newsletter to Arizona Republicans supporting Trump for governor. The same month, Nixon wrote a note to Trump, igniting a correspondence that would last beyond Trump's campaign. In July 1956, Trump asked for Nixon to vouch for him if contacted by Texas Republican H. L. Hunt, to which he agreed. An advertisement for Trump's campaign touts him as being a cousin of electrical engineer John G. Trump (along with a photograph of the two together), brother of New York real-estate developer Fred Trump (the father of Donald Trump). Trump garnered the least support of any major candidate in his gubernatorial campaign, receiving 13.92% of the vote. Three other Republicans had run, and the incumbent Democrat, Ernest McFarland, won the election.

Trump later lived in Boulder, Colorado. He continued corresponding with Nixon, even advising him on the approach he should take in campaigning against John F. Kennedy in the 1960 presidential election. He wrote, "Please refer to Sen. K, not by name, but as the 'Junior Senator from Massachusetts'!" Nixon called his advice "most welcome". Trump returned to Arizona, and in 1965 became the founding president of Scottsdale's chapter of the Sons of the American Revolution. (Note: The same year, Barry Goldwater became a charter member.) He also served on the vestry at the Episcopal church Saint Barnabas on the Desert. He worked for a while in Ogden, Utah, where he died at the age of 54 due to heart complications. He was buried in Saint Paul.

== Gallery of correspondence ==
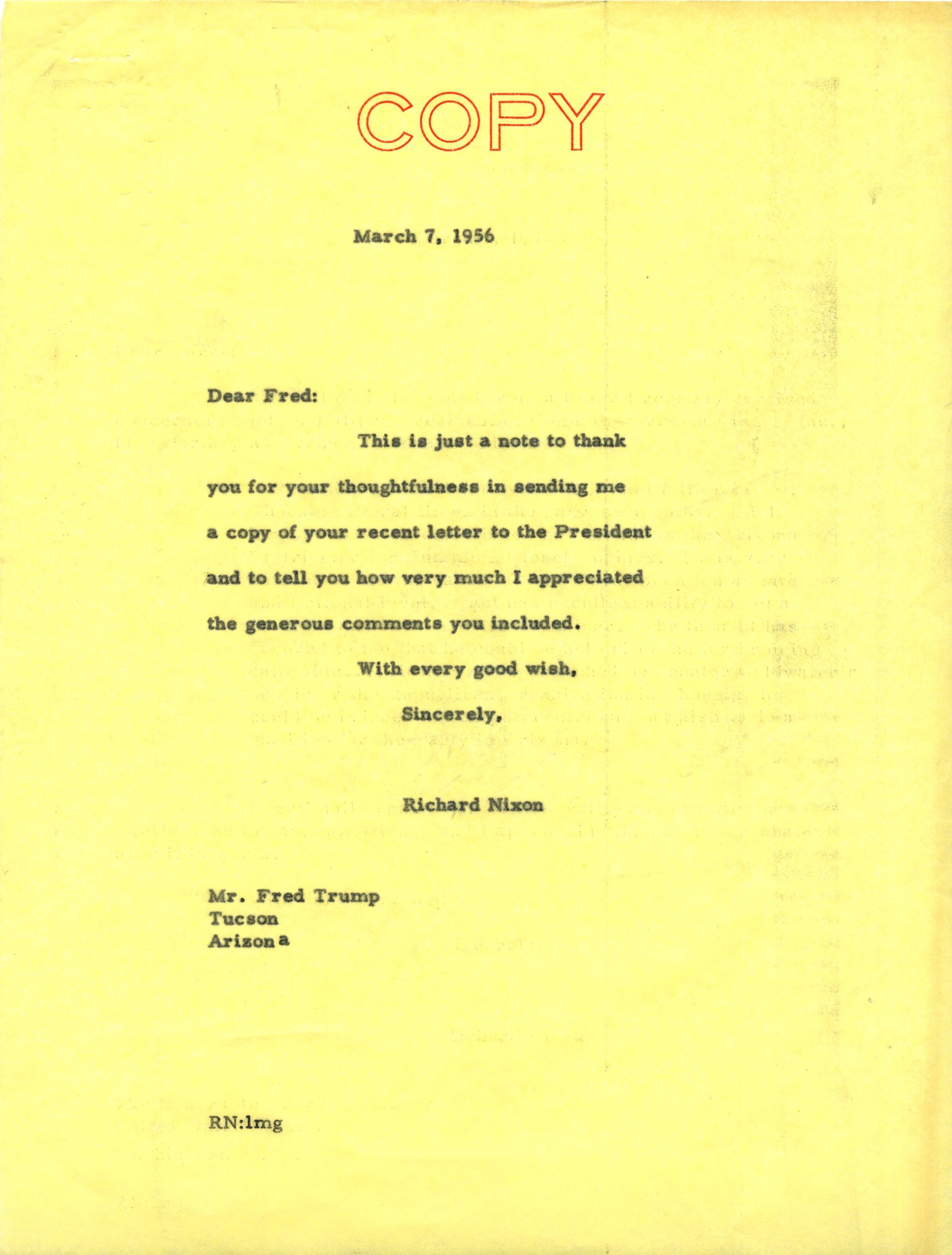
Richard Nixon - Letter to Fred Trump (March 7, 1956)

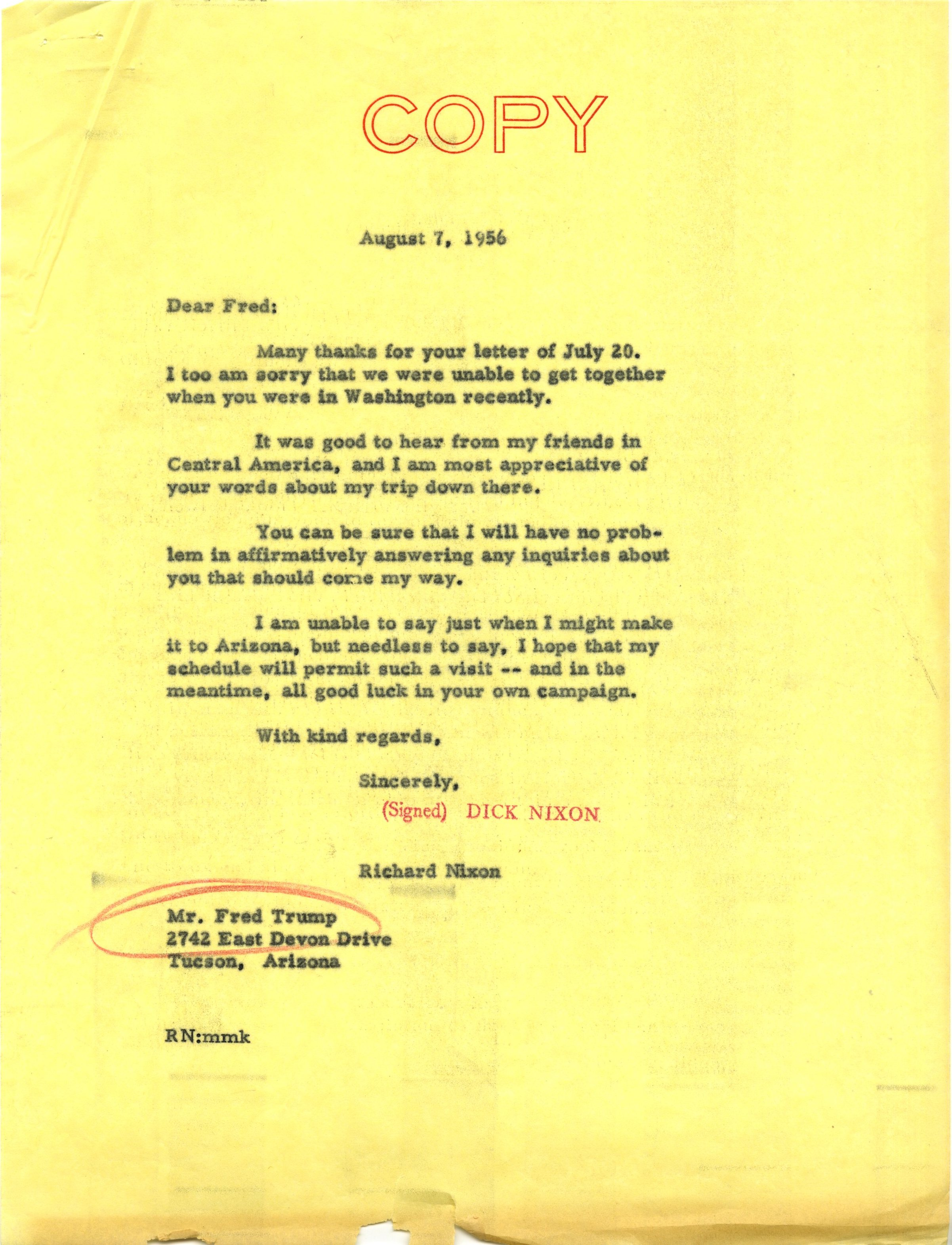
Richard Nixon - Letter to Fred Trump (August 7, 1956)

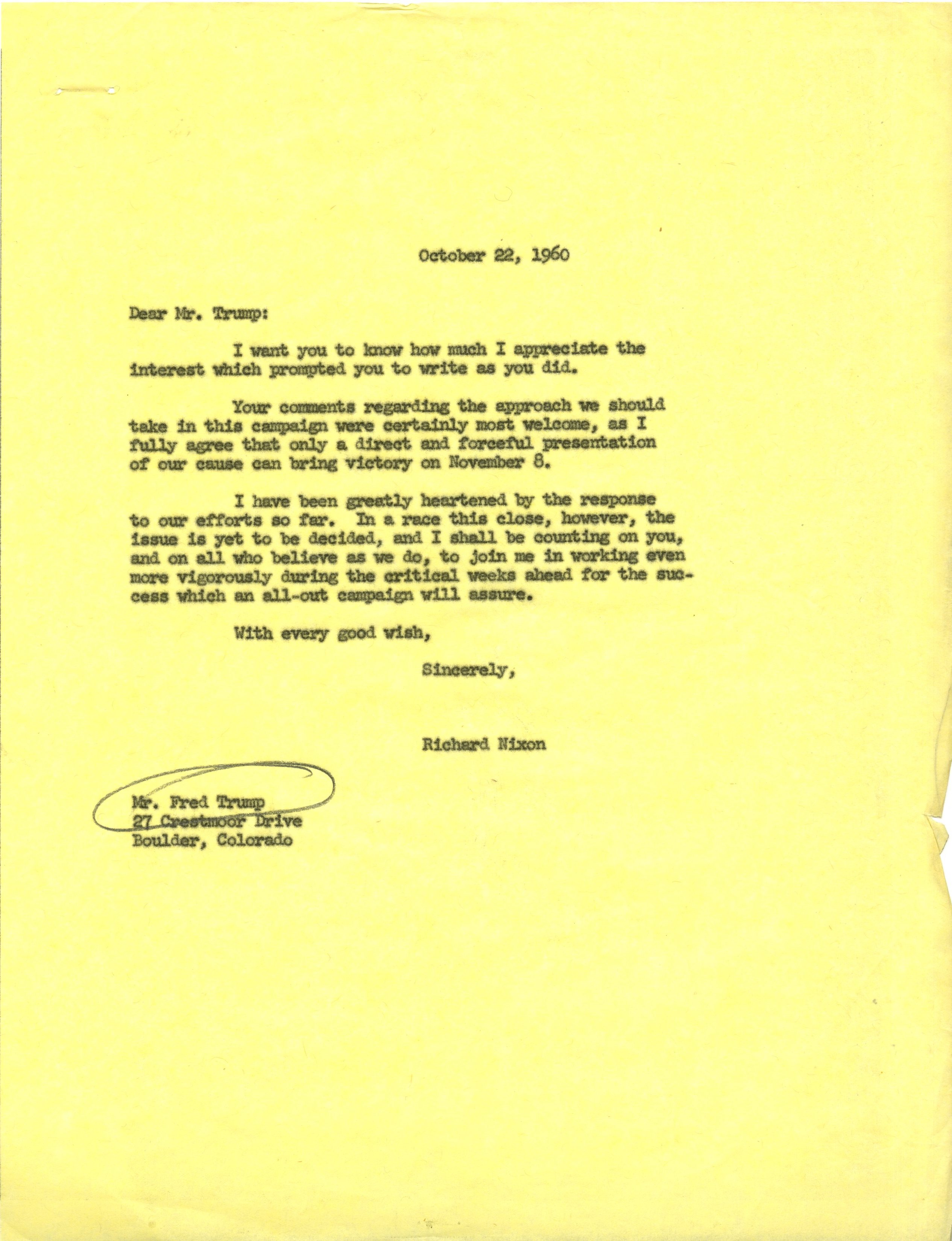
Richard Nixon - Letter to Fred Trump (October 22, 1960)
