= Justin A. Frank =

American author (born 1943)

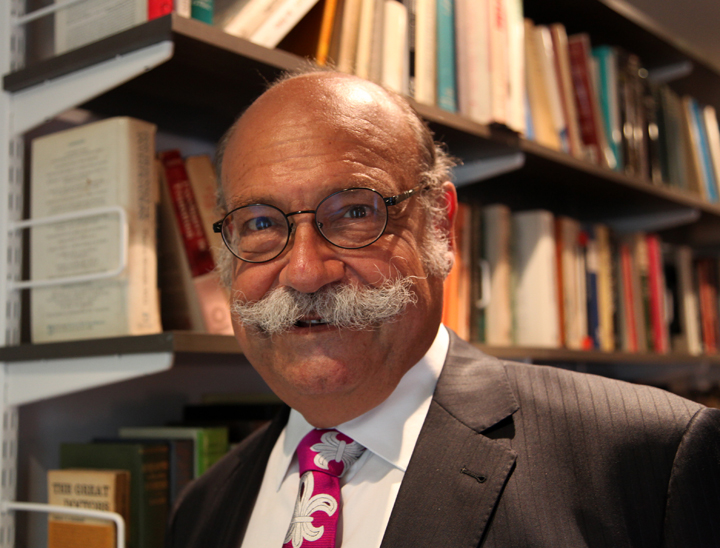
- Born: February 26, 1943 (age 83)
- Citizenship: United States
- Education: Harvard Medical School
- Scientific career
- Workplaces: George Washington University

Justin A. Frank (born February 25, 1943, in Los Angeles, CA) is an American author who practices and teaches psychoanalysis in Washington, DC. Frank is a frequent contributor to The Huffington Post on topics as diverse as politics, film, and theater. He is a former clinical professor of psychiatry at the George Washington University Medical Center.

Frank completed his psychiatric residency at the Harvard Medical School and became the chief resident at the Cambridge Hospital. Frank was awarded the DuPont-Warren Fellowship by Massachusetts General Hospital. Frank is also the co-director of the Metropolitan Center for Object Relations in New York.

Frank employs the principles of applied psychoanalysis to put together the kind of psychological profile used in his books about U.S. presidents: Bush on the Couch: Inside the Mind of the President, which was extensively quoted from by Fidel Castro in his annual speech in 2004, and Obama on the Couch: Inside the Mind of the President. In 2018, he published Trump on the Couch: Inside the Mind of the President.
