= Johann Michael Hartung =

German organ builder (1708–1763)

- Born: 3 February 1708
- Origin: Germany
- Died: 13 January 1763 (aged 54)
- Occupation: Organ builder

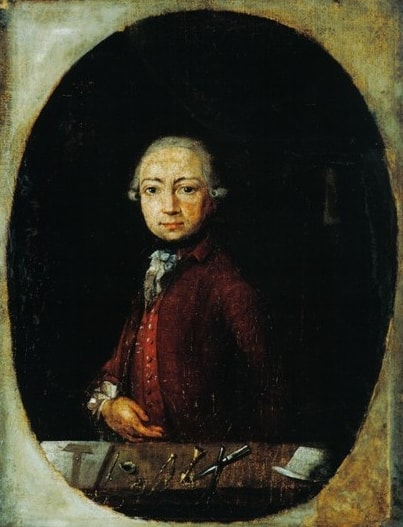
Johann Michael Hartung (ca. 1750)

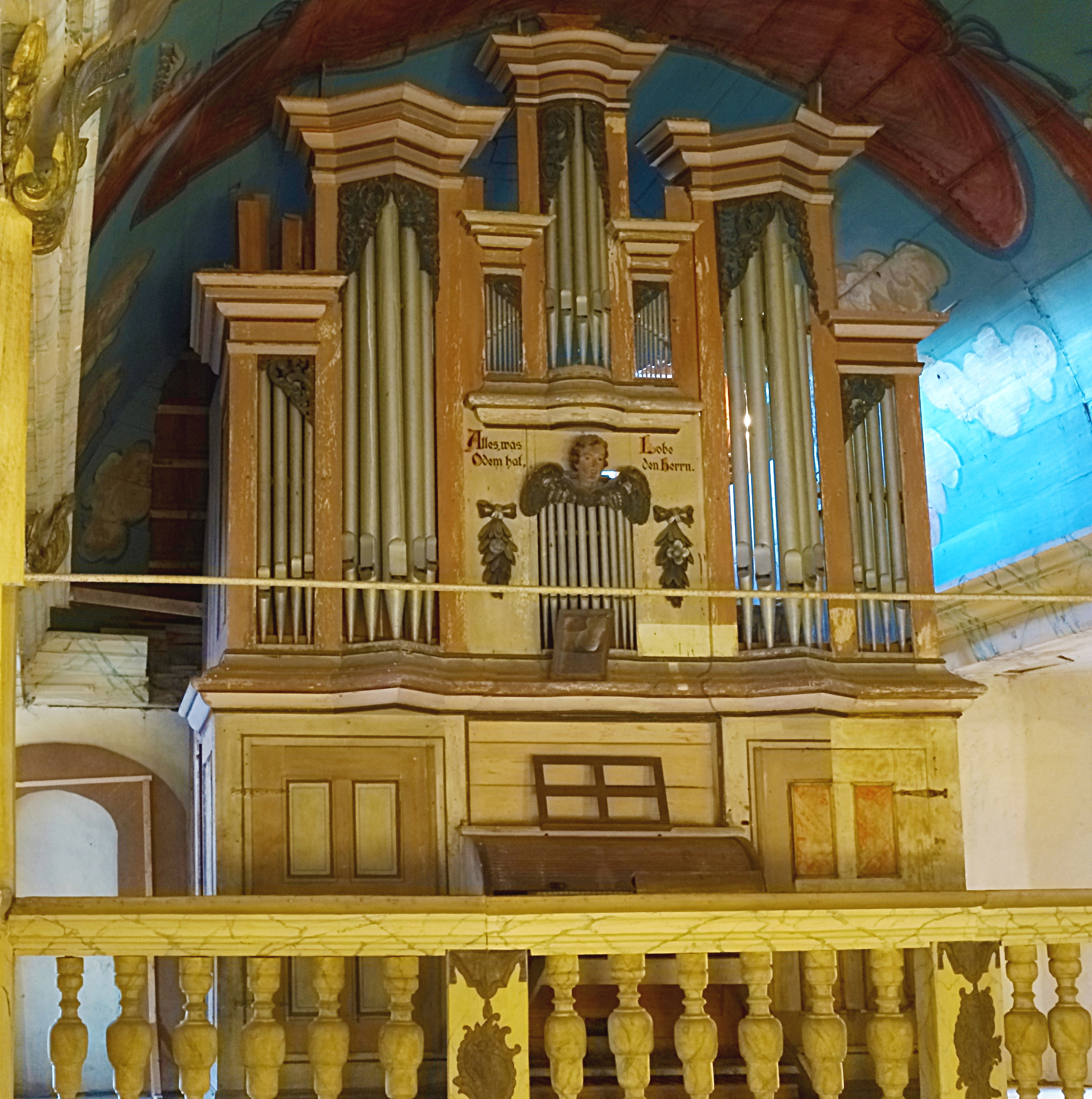
Hartung's organ in Westgreußen

Johann Michael Hartung (3 February 1708 – 13 January 1763) was a German organ builder and public figure from Dürkheim, a town in the Electoral Palatinate.

He was the son of organ builder Augustinus Hartung (1677–1739) and Sophia Hartung née Schwab. Hartung learned the trade as his father's successor in the family workshop, and is recorded as doing independent work in 1733. He built organs in Winden in 1746, in Gimmeldingen in 1749, in Enkenbach in 1751, in Haßloch and Rohrbach in 1752, and in Edenkoben and Oberotterbach in 1754. His last known contract was with Assenheim, in 1759.

Hartung married Anna Barbara Klein in 1737. The couple had four children. After the death of his wife from a miscarriage in 1746, Hartung married Maria Louise Baum in 1747, with whom he had nine children, among them Johann Philipp Hartung (born 1750, died 1806 in Kallstadt), the last organ builder in the Hartung family.

At the time of his death at age 54, Hartung was judge and councilor in Dürkheim.

Hartung is an ancestor of Donald Trump via the latter's paternal grandmother, Elizabeth Christ.
