= All Faiths Cemetery =

Cemetery in New York City

Coordinates: 40°42′44″N 73°53′15″W

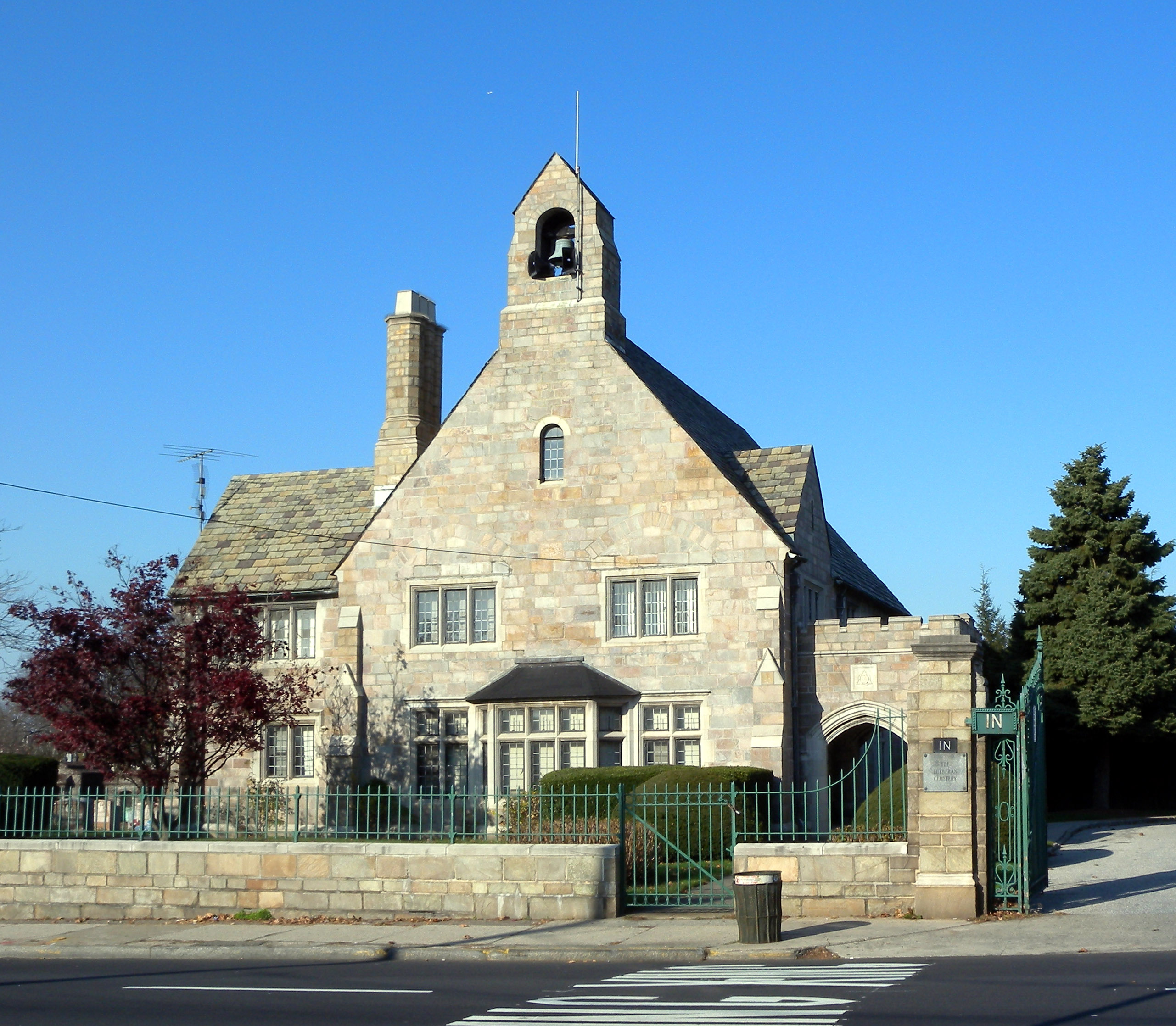
All Faiths Cemetery

The All Faiths Cemetery is located in Middle Village, Queens, New York. The 225-acre (91-hectare) cemetery was established in 1850 by Lutheran pastor Frederick W. Geissenhainer, and incorporated in 1852. Originally named Lutheran Cemetery, it was renamed to Lutheran All Faiths Cemetery in 1990. Approximately 540,000 burials have been conducted at the cemetery since its founding.

== History ==
In 1847, the New York state legislature passed the Rural Cemetery Act, which allowed nonprofit organizations to incorporate and sell burial plots. Seeing an opportunity to provide a lower-cost alternative to existing cemeteries such as Green-wood in Brooklyn, the Rev. Dr. Frederick W. Geissenhainer, the pastor of St. Paul's German Lutheran Church, conferred with representatives of St. Matthew's Lutheran Church (his prior parish). While St. Paul's decided against investing in this endeavor, St. Matthew's and Dr. Geissenhainer pursued the purchase of land in Queens in 1850. The parcels owned by St. Matthews and Dr. Geissenhainer were held and developed separately; he incorporated as the "Lutheran Cemetery" (although members of all faiths were accepted) on March 22, 1852. Additional acreage was purchased over the next few years, and the Lutheran Cemetery bought the St. Matthew's land in 1868. Burials at the Lutheran Cemetery started at $2.50, and plots could be obtained for $7.00.

In 1990, the name was changed to All Faiths Cemetery "to show accommodation to ALL religious and non-religious patrons".

In 2006, vandals allegedly toppled over or destroyed over 60 headstones, some of which the cemetery's president said weighed over 800 pounds (360 kilograms); he asserted that a group of mischievous teenagers had caused the damage and stated, "At first it seemed they were targeting Jewish-sounding names, but then we realized they were just jumping all over."

=== Management issues ===
Beginning in 2014, local news media ran stories questioning why some sections of the cemetery were in disrepair. One article described "Toppled monuments, sunken gravestones and shattered mausoleum windows..." The chairman of the cemetery's board of directors attributed such conditions to a lack of funds and state law restricting use of perpetual-care funds for upkeep of graves where the owners had not paid for such care.

On September 3, 2019, New York Attorney General Letitia James filed suit against the directors and officers of the cemetery, alleging that they had "exploited their positions at the Cemetery to draw fees, salaries, and loans from the Cemetery's charitable assets while ignoring their basic fiduciary obligation to manage the assets under their control for the benefit of the Cemetery and its property." The lawsuit followed investigations arising from an audit by the New York State Division of Cemeteries in 2014. In 2024, James announced that she had recovered $1.6M from two of the directors.

== Notable burials and memorials ==
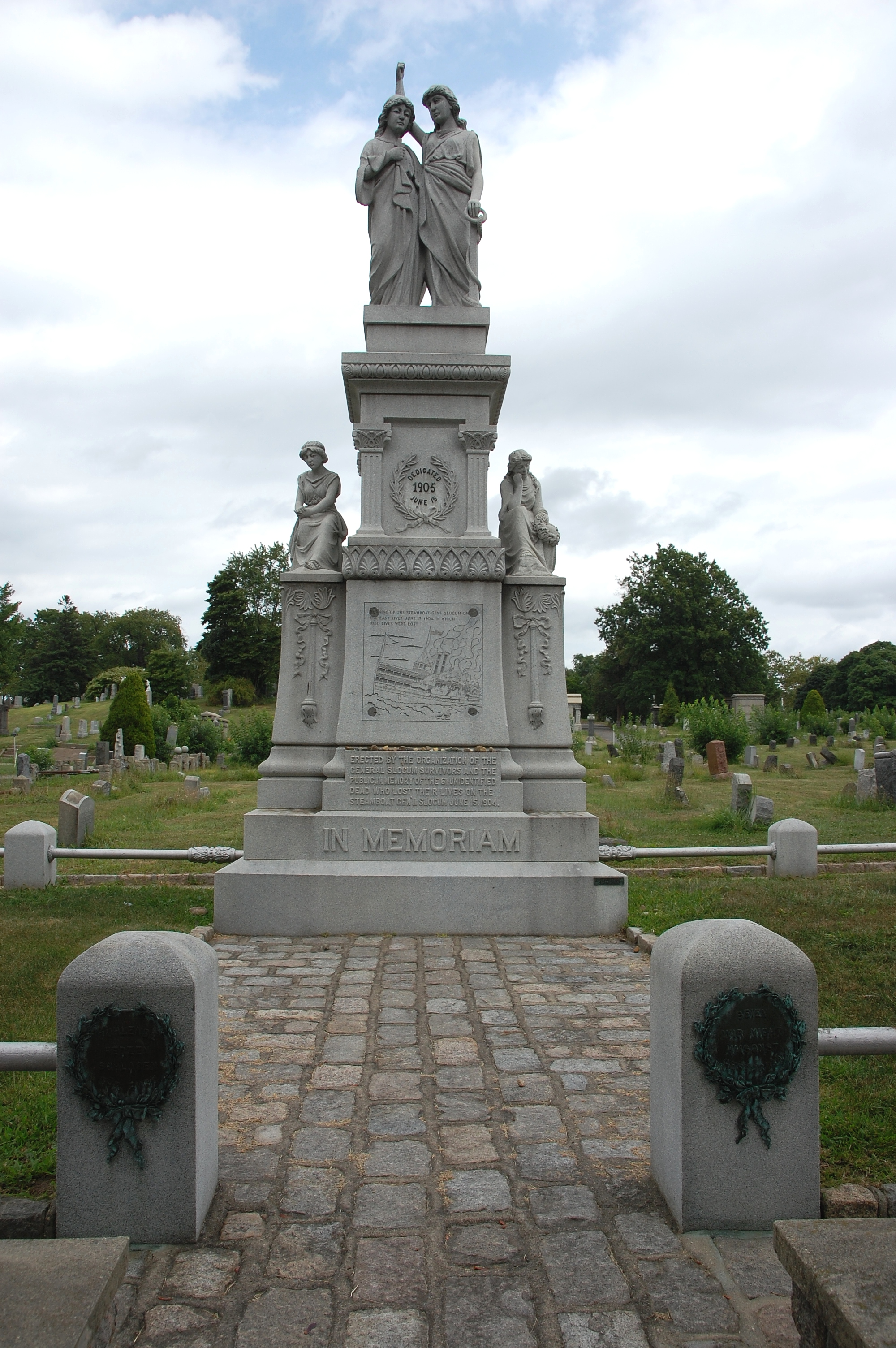
The victims of the 1904 fire on the steamboat General Slocum—which caused around 1,000 fatalities—are memorialized at the cemetery, where 61 unknown victims were buried.

- PS General Slocum steamboat fire mass memorial – commemorates the 1,021 victims of a 1904 disaster. 61 unidentified individuals are buried beneath the monument
- John Kissel (1864–1938) – U.S. Congressman
- John Herman George Vehslage (1842–1904) – U.S. Congressman
- Frank T. Hopkins (1865–1951) – horseman and endurance rider
- Carrie Nye (1936–2006) – actress
- William Johnston "Buffalo Bill" Hogg (1881–1909) – Major League Baseball player
- Charley Jones (1852–1911) – Major League Baseball player
- William G. Mank (1831–1887) – Brigadier General in the Union Army in the Civil War
- William Koelpin (1845–1912) – U.S. Congressional Medal of Honor recipient
- William Lord (1841–1915) – U.S. Congressional Medal of Honor recipient
- Charles Stephen Schepke (1878–1933) – U.S. Congressional Medal of Honor recipient
- Christian Streile (1838–1886) – U.S. Congressional Medal of Honor recipient
- George Uhrl (1838–1911) – U.S. Congressional Medal of Honor recipient
- Otto Botticher (1811–1886) – artist, lithographer and Civil War veteran
- Several members of the Trump family, including:
  - Frederick Trump (1869–1918) – businessman and grandfather of Donald Trump, the 45th and 47th U.S. president
  - Elizabeth Christ Trump (1880–1966) – businesswoman and grandmother of Donald Trump
  - Fred Trump (1905–1999) – businessman and father of Donald Trump
  - Mary Anne MacLeod Trump (1912–2000) – mother of Donald Trump
  - Fred Trump Jr (1938-1981) – airplane pilot and oldest brother of Donald Trump
  - Robert Trump (1948-2020) – businessman and younger brother of Donald Trump

== In popular culture ==
The following films have been shot at the cemetery:

- Rosemary's Baby (1968)
- Man on a Ledge (2012)
- Abigail (2019)
