= Otto Botticher =

German-American artist (1811–1886)

- Born: 19 May 1811; Prussia
- Died: 1 July 1886 (aged 75)
- Burial place: All Faiths Cemetery, Queens, New York
- Occupations: Painter and lithographer
- Known for: Union Prisoners at Salisbury, N.C.

Otto Botticher (19 May 1811 – 1 July 1886) was a German-born painter and lithographer best known for his 1863 rendering of a baseball game at a prisoner of war camp during the American Civil War. That illustration, Union Prisoners at Salisbury, NC, was based on Botticher's experience as a prisoner at the camp in 1862.

== Personal History ==
Botticher (also spelled Boetticher) emigrated from Prussia to New York in 1848, along with his wife and three young children. His occupation was listed on the ship's passenger list as "economist," and some sources speculate that he had served in the Prussian military, but he earned his living in New York as an artist. Directories from the 1850s list him as a partner with Charles Gildemeister, then with Thomas Benecke, in portrait painting and lithography businesses located on Broadway in New York City. Many of Botticher's works depicted scenes in New York City and military subjects.

In July 1861 he enlisted in the 68th New York Volunteer Regiment of Infantry, becoming Captain of Company G in August of that year. He was captured by Confederate troops on March 29, 1862, and imprisoned at Libby Prison in Richmond, Virginia, and then at Salisbury, North Carolina. In September 1862 he was exchanged for a Southern officer. He rejoined his regiment in 1863 and fought at Chancellorsville and Gettysburg. After his discharge in 1864, he was awarded the brevet rank of Lieutenant Colonel in 1865.

Following the war he lived in Brooklyn, New York. In addition to working as an artist, he was a consular official for the North German Union.

Botticher died on July 1, 1886, and was buried at the Lutheran Cemetery in Queens, New York.

== Union Prisoners at Salisbury, NC ==
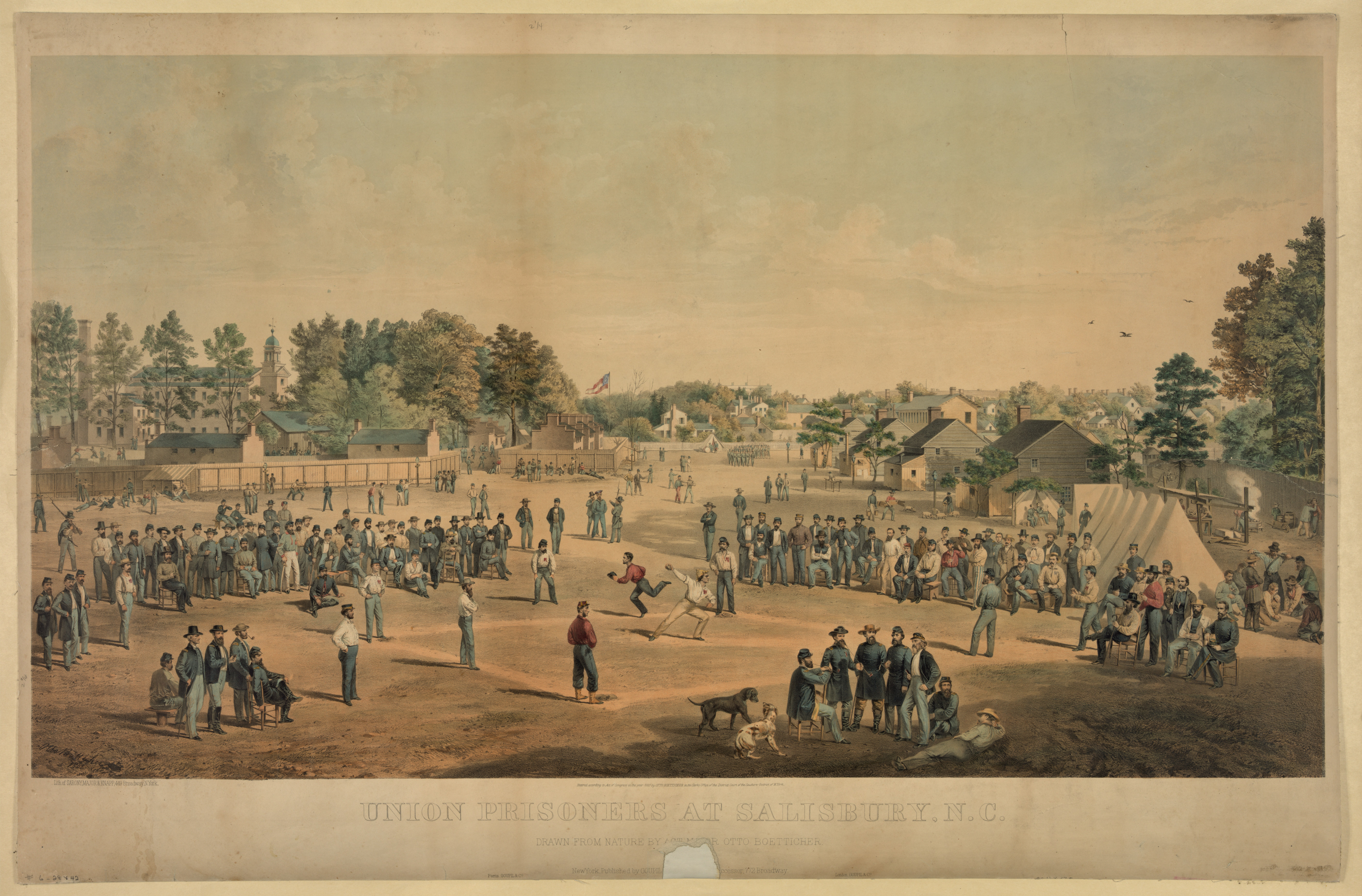

Botticher was imprisoned at the Confederate military prison at Salisbury, North Carolina during the spring and summer of 1862. At that time conditions at the facility were relatively good. Prisoners were permitted to engage in recreational activities such as baseball, as depicted in this image created by Botticher. Originally a watercolor, it was reproduced as a lithograph after the war. It is one of the earliest depictions of baseball being played.

The setting for this drawing is significant, as the spread of baseball's popularity from the North to the rest of the country occurred during the Civil War. Union soldiers taught the game to those from the West and South. Following the end of the Civil War, it became popular throughout the United States. According to the Smithsonian conditions in the prison detreated as prisoner exchanges stopped and the population grew causing overcrowding, shortages and diseases due to conditions.
