= Drumpf =

Family name

Drumpf, also spelled as Trumpf or Drumpft, is a German surname which can be traced through different linguistic paths to 'triumph', 'drum' or 'trumpet', and Middle High German 'rumph' meaning either stout or crooked. It is most commonly known as the predecessor to the family name of Donald Trump, stemming from the 'rumph' etymology, 45th and 47th president of the United States. Comedy show host John Oliver brought attention to the name during a February 2016 segment of his Last Week Tonight television series.

== History ==
According to author Gwenda Blair, Hanns Drumpf, an itinerant lawyer who moved to Kallstadt in 1608, was Trump's ancestor and that the spelling of his last name had changed by the end of the 17th century.

In 2011, the International Business Times repeated a claim that Donald Trump's paternal grandfather Frederick Trump changed his name from Drumpf to Trump, possibly to avoid anti-German sentiment popular at the time.

In a segment of Last Week Tonight that aired on February 28, 2016, comedian John Oliver urged viewers to refer to Donald Trump as "Drumpf", using the slogan "Make Donald Drumpf Again".

In 2019, German broadcaster DW Akademie reported from the Trump German ancestral home in Kallstadt that there were no more people with the surname, and that according to the city's transportation association, the spelling had likely been changed during the reign of Napoleon around the turn of the 19th century.

== In popular culture ==
In the 2016 graphic novel Love Is Love, one comic features a superhero, Rainbow Boy, who uses his powers to fight "Doc Drumpf" and his armies of "Spider Haters".
