= Bötticher =

Bötticher, sometimes spelled Boetticher, is a surname of Germanic origin. Notable people with the surname include:

== Persons with the surname Bötticher ==
List may include persons with the surname von Bötticher.

- Adolf Bötticher (1842–1901), German art historian and conservator
- Hans Bötticher (1883–1934), German author and painter best known by the pseudonym Joachim Ringelnatz
- Herbert Bötticher (1928-2008), German actor
- Johann Friedrich Bötticher, an historic misspelling of Johann Friedrich Böttger (1682–1719), German alchemist credited with the industrial manufacturing process of Meissen porcelain.
- Karl Bötticher (1806–1889), German architect and instructor to Martin Gropius
- Paul Bötticher aka Paul de Lagarde (1827–1891), German scholar noted for his writings on oriental languages, the Bible, and his own antisemitic views

== Persons with the surname Boetticher ==
List may include persons with the surname von Boetticher.

- Budd Boetticher (1916–2001), American film director most famous for 1950s Hollywood Westerns
- Friedrich Heinrich von Boetticher, German art historian
- Gale Boetticher, fictional American chemist from the AMC television series Breaking Bad
- Hans von Boetticher (1886–1958), German zoologist who worked on ornithology and entomology
- Karl Heinrich von Boetticher (1833–1907), German Secretary of the Interior (1880–1897) and Vice Chancellor of Germany (1881–1897).
- Walter von Boetticher (1853–1945), German historian, genealogist and physician.

== Things ==
- Sociedad Recreativa Villaverde Boetticher Club de Fútbol, soccer club in Madrid, Spain

== See also ==
- Böttger
