= John W. Walter =

American politician and Donald Trump's paternal cousin (1934–2018)

John Whitney Walter

14th Mayor of Flower Hill
- In office 1988–1996
- Preceded by: Raymond W. Tekverk
- Succeeded by: Derrick A. Rubin

Village Historian of Flower Hill
- In office 1996–2018

Personal details
- Born: April 17, 1934 Queens, New York, U.S.
- Died: January 5, 2018 (aged 83) Manhasset, New York, U.S.
- Spouse: Joan Smith (m. 1963)
- Relations: Trump family
- Children: 3
- Education: Norwich University (BS); Columbia University (MBA)
- Known for: Trump Organization; All County Building Supply and Maintenance; politics; business

Military service
- Branch/service: United States Army
- Rank: Second Lieutenant

John Whitney Walter (April 17, 1934 – January 5, 2018) was an American historian, engineer, businessman, author, and politician – as well as a first cousin to United States president Donald Trump. He worked for the Trump Organization and was the executive vice president of Trump Management, served as the historian of the Trump family, and was the 14th mayor of Flower Hill, New York.

== Early life, education, and military service ==
John Walter was born in Queens, New York, on April 17, 1934, to William Otto Walter, a banker for Manufacturers Trust Company, and Elizabeth Trump Walter, the sister of Fred Trump.

As a child, Walter grew up in Hollis, Queens, until 1958, when the family moved to 511 Manhasset Woods Road in the Manhasset portion of Flower Hill, New York. He attended St. Paul's High School in Garden City, New York, along with Admiral Ballard Academy, located in Connecticut. Walter received his Bachelor of Science in Business Administration in 1955 from Norwich University, and earned his Master of Business Administration from Columbia University in 1960.

Between his undergraduate and graduate studies, Walter served two years in the United States Army. He was stationed in Heidelberg, Germany, as a second lieutenant.

== Career ==
Walter built a burglar alarm company, National Security Systems in Port Washington, New York, which both manufactured burglar alarm control panels and installed & serviced burglar alarm and access control systems in the New York metropolitan area.

Later, Walter began working with his family in the Trump Organization, and was the executive vice president of Trump Management, Inc. During this time, Walter helped his family set up All County Building Supply and Maintenance, which he operated from the basement of his home at 511 Manhasset Woods Road; All County was founded in 1992. The Trumps used this company for the maintenance of a number of Trump-owned properties – including the Beach Haven apartment complex in Brooklyn. Walter and the four Trump children each owned a 20% stake in All County; Walter also received a portion of the markup for his work creating the invoices. As an engineer, Walter also designed communication and security systems for the Trump casinos, hotels, and apartments in Atlantic City, New Jersey, Las Vegas, Nevada, and New York City.

In 1990, Ivana Trump claimed in an interview that whenever Walter greeted Donald Trump in his Trump Organization office, he would click his heels together and say "Heil Hitler," possibly as a family joke.

Walter was also the Trump family's historian, and managed much of the family's finances. Walter stored the family's financial records in his basement.

Additionally, Walter served for many years as the president of the Flower Hill Association – a civic association within the Village of Flower Hill.

In 2020, Walter was mentioned in Mary L. Trump's book, Too Much and Never Enough, as having helped his uncle, Fred Trump, with tax avoidance schemes.

== Mayor of Flower Hill (1988–1996) ==
In 1988, Walter was elected mayor of Flower Hill, New York. He served in this capacity until finishing his fourth term in 1996, when Derrick A. Rubin was elected as his successor. During his tenure, Walter was a key voice in the widening of Manhasset Woods Road, along with the rehabilitation of the Flower Hill Park, which at the time was owned by Nassau County.

== Historian of Flower Hill (1996–2018) ==
After serving as Flower Hill's mayor, Walter became the village's historian. He served in this capacity until his death, and was succeeded by Rhoda Becker .

== Personal life ==
Walter married Joan Smith at the Congregational Church of Manhasset in 1963. They had three daughters;

- Christine "Christy" Walter, married to Robert "Bob" Weppler, three daughters
- Nancy Walter, married to James "Jim" Kiley, a son and a daughter
- Cindy Walter, married to Rod Frey, two sons

Walter lived Flower Hill, New York, with his family, for the last 60 years of his life. He was an avid collector of American coins and an amateur astronomer.

== Death ==
John Walter died on January 5, 2018, after a year-long cancer battle, at age 83. In April 2018, following his death, the Congregational Church of Manhasset held a memorial celebration in Walter's honor.

== See also ==
- Family of Donald Trump
