= Christian Streile =

Private Christian Streile
- Born: 27 November 1838; Landkreis Heilbronn, Kingdom of Württemberg (modern day Baden-Württemberg, Germany)
- Died: 4 December 1886 (aged 48); New York
- Burial place: All Faiths Cemetery, Middle Village, New York
- Military career
- Allegiance: United States (Union)
- Branch: Army
- Service years: 1864-1865
- Rank: Private
- Units: Company I, 1st New Jersey Cavalry
- Conflicts: Paines Crossroads, Virginia
- Awards: Medal of Honor

Christian Streile (27 November 1838 - 4 December 1886) was a private in the United States Army who was awarded the Medal of Honor for gallantry during the American Civil War. He was awarded the medal on 3 May 1865 for actions performed during the Battle of Sailor's Creek in Virginia.

== Personal life ==
Streile was born on 27 November 1838 in Landkreis Heilbronn, Kingdom of Württemberg (state of Baden-Württemberg in modern day Germany). He married Catherine Streile. He died on 4 December 1886 in New York and is buried in All Faiths Cemetery in Middle Village, New York.

== Military service ==
Streile was mustered into service with Company I, 1st New Jersey Cavalry on 15 February 1864. He earned the Medal of Honor on 5 April 1865 at the Battle of Sailor's Creek in Virginia for capturing an unspecified enemy flag. He was mustered out of service on 24 July 1865.

The President of the United States of America, in the name of Congress, takes pleasure in presenting the Medal of Honor to Private Christian Streile, United States Army, for extraordinary heroism on 5 April 1865, while serving with Company I, 1st New Jersey Cavalry, in action at Paines Crossroads, Virginia, for capture of flag.

— E. M. Stanton
