= Frederick Trump =

German and American businessman (1869–1918)

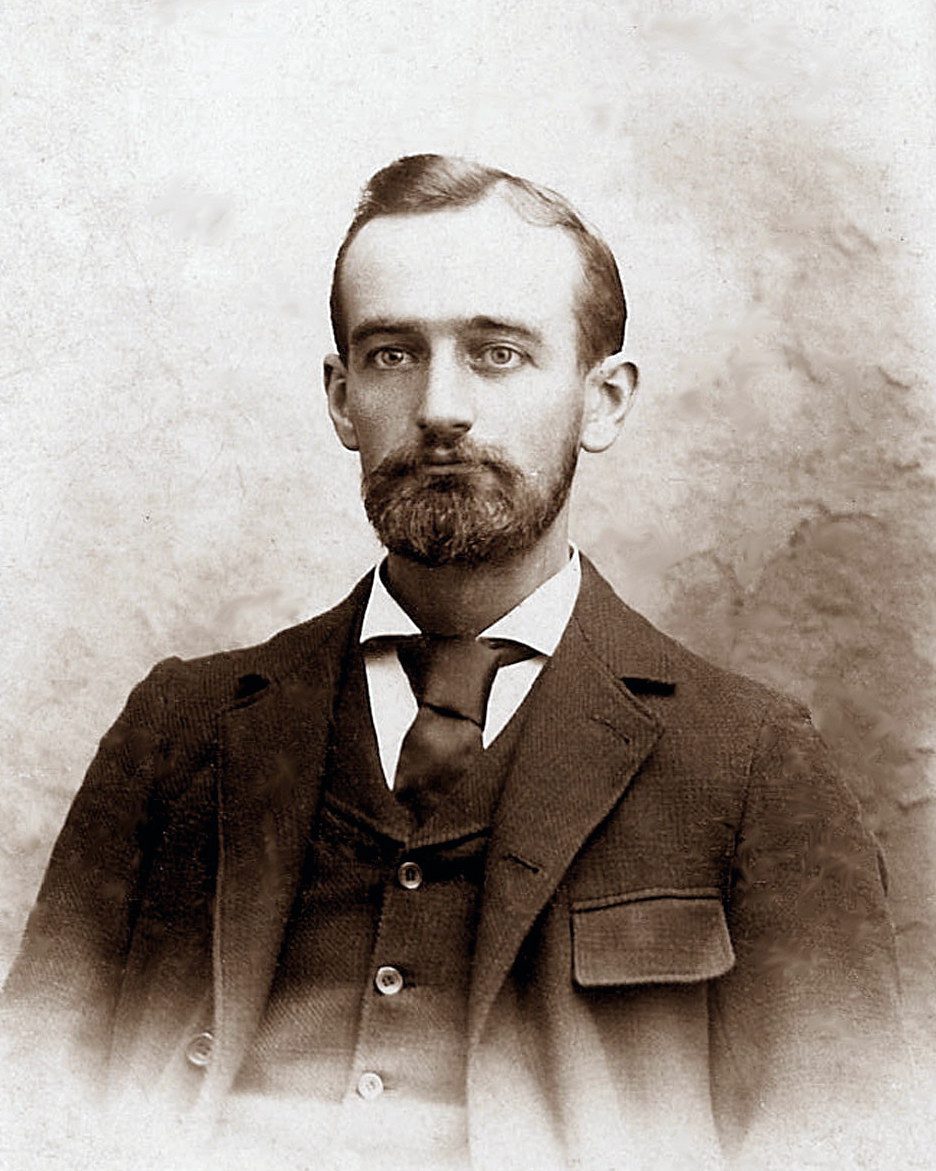
- Trump circa 1905
- Born: Friedrich Trump; March 14, 1869; Kallstadt, Kingdom of Bavaria
- Died: May 30, 1918 (aged 49); New York City, U.S.
- Burial place: All Faiths Cemetery, Queens, New York City
- Citizenship: Kingdom of Bavaria (until 1871); German Empire (1871–1905); U.S. (from 1892)
- Occupation: Businessman
- Spouse: Elizabeth Christ (m. 1902)
- Children: 3, including Fred and John
- Family: Trump

Frederick Trump (born Friedrich Trump, German: [ˈfʁidʁɪç ˈtʁʊmp]; March 14, 1869 – May 30, 1918) was a German and American businessman. He was the patriarch of the Trump family and the paternal grandfather of Donald Trump, the 45th and 47th president of the United States.

Born and raised in Kallstadt, in what was then the Kingdom of Bavaria, Trump immigrated to the United States in 1885. In 1891, he began speculating in real estate in Seattle. During the Klondike Gold Rush, he moved to Yukon, Canada, and made his fortune by operating a restaurant and a brothel for miners in Whitehorse.

In 1901, Trump returned to Kallstadt and married fellow Bavarian Elisabeth Christ. As he had failed to complete mandatory military service and notify the authorities of his departure in 1885, the Bavarian government stripped him of his citizenship in 1905 and ordered him to leave. Consequently, he returned to the United States with his family.

Trump worked as a barber and manager of a restaurant-hotel and was beginning to acquire real estate in Queens when he died in the 1918 flu pandemic.

== Early life ==
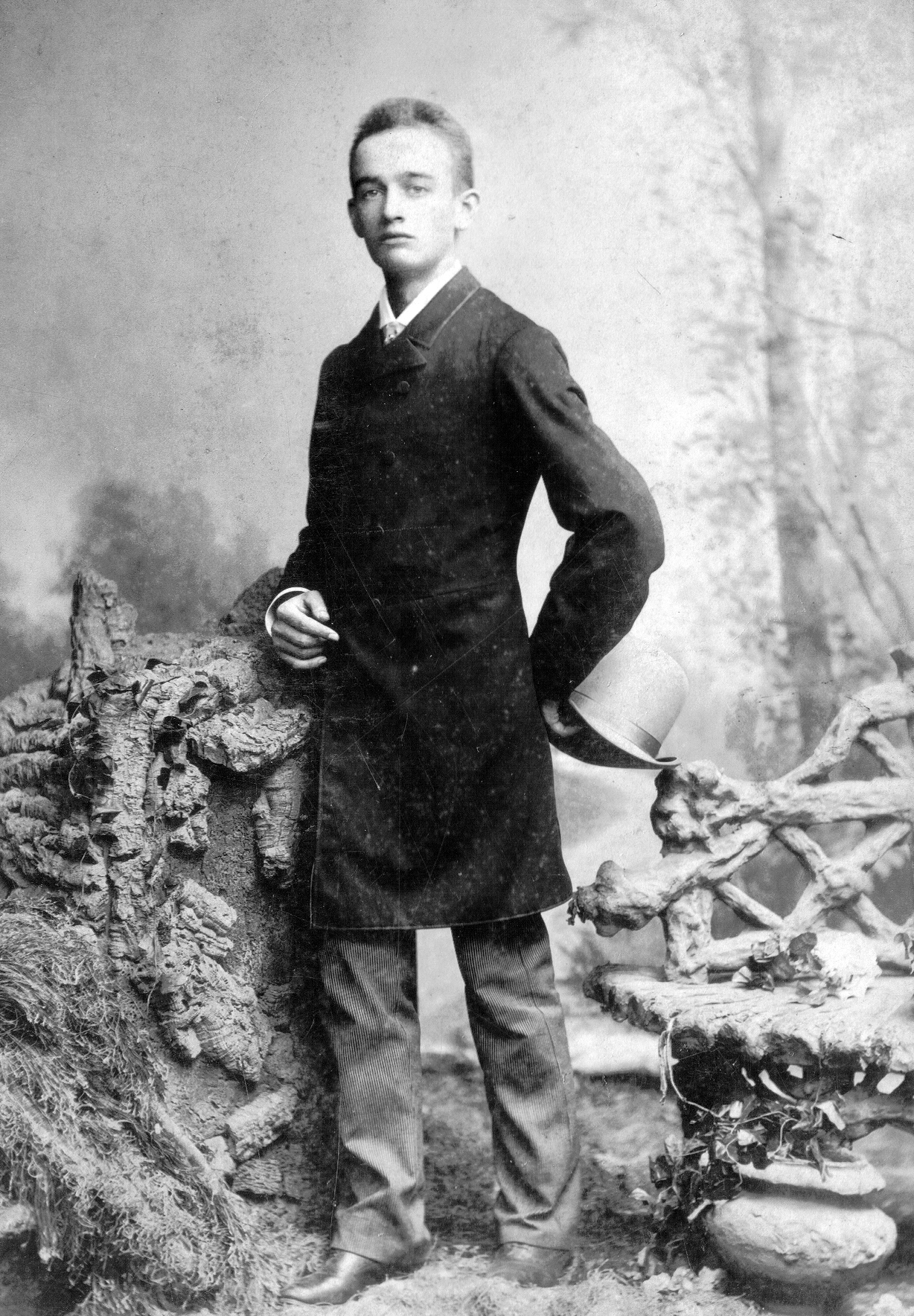
Friedrich Trump, 1887

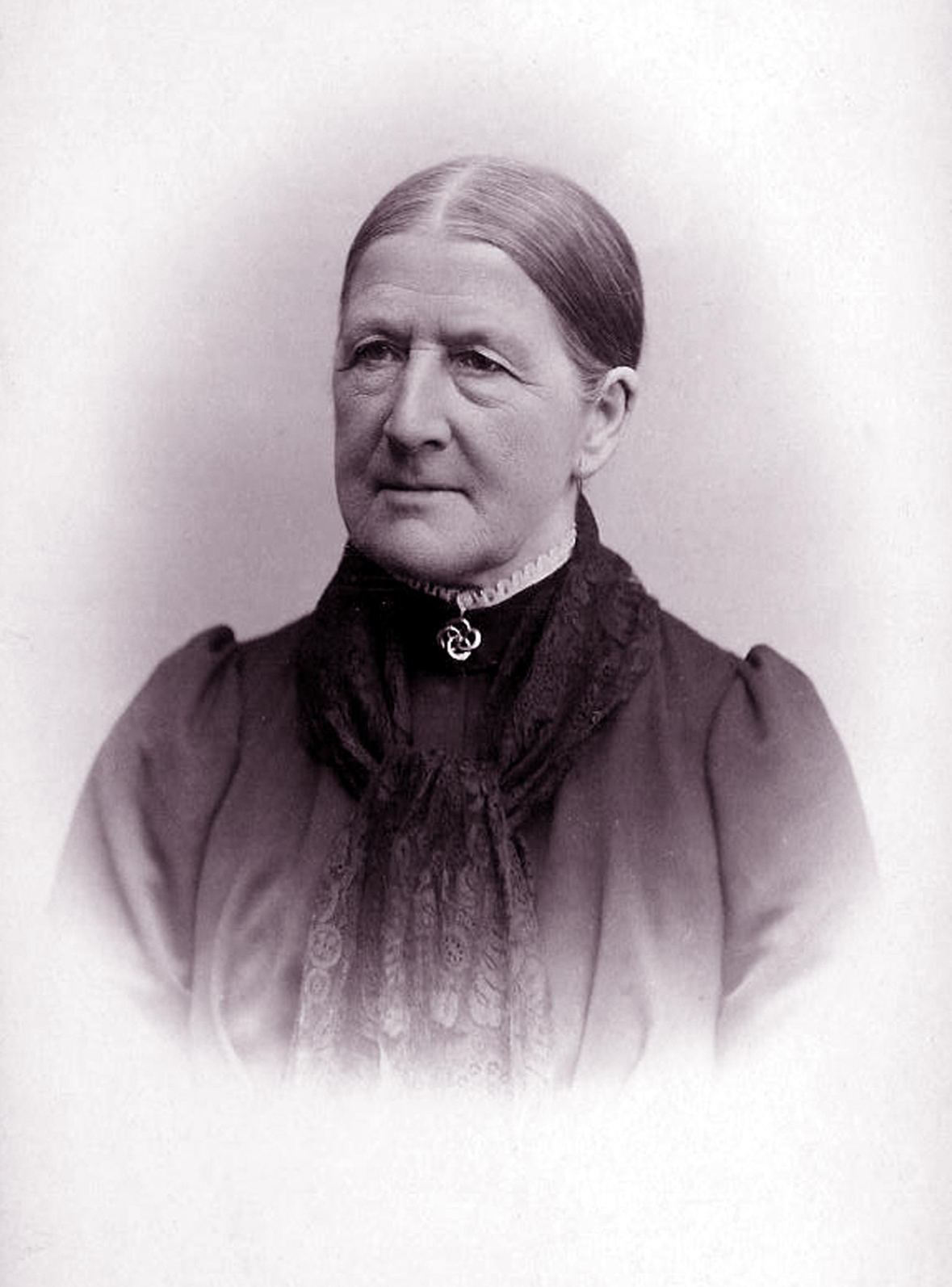
Frederick Trump's mother, Katharine Kober

Friedrich Trump was born in Kallstadt in the Palatinate (then part of the Kingdom of Bavaria) to Johannes Trump II (1829–1877) and Katharina Kober (1836–1922). Religiously, the village was Lutheran.

Trump's earliest known male ancestor is Johann Philipp Drumpft (1667–1707, parents or place of birth not recorded), who married Juliana Maria Rodenroth. The couple had a son, Johann Sebastian Trump (1699–1756). Johann Sebastian's son Johann Paul Trump (1727–1792) was born in Bobenheim am Berg.

The first link to Kallstadt can be established for Johann Sebastian's grandson Johannes Trump (1789–1836) who was born in Bobenheim am Berg and married in Kallstadt, where he also died. Graves from the 21st century at the village cemetery indicate that members of the Trump family still live in Kallstadt.

From 1816 to 1918, when Bavaria became the Free State of Bavaria, the Palatinate was part of the Kingdom of Bavaria. In 1871, Bavaria became a part of the newly formed German Empire. During periods of war and anti-German discrimination in the US, Trump's son Fred later denied his German heritage, claiming his father had been a Swede from Karlstad. This version was repeated by Fred's son Donald in his 1987 autobiography.

After being sick with emphysema for 10 years, Trump's father, Johannes, died on July 6, 1877, aged 48, leaving the family in severe debt from medical expenses. While five of the six children worked in the family grape fields, Friedrich was considered too sickly to endure such hard labor. In 1883, then aged 14, he was sent to nearby Frankenthal by his mother to work as a barber's apprentice and learn the trade.

Trump worked seven days a week for two and a half years under barber Friedrich Lang. After completing his apprenticeship, he returned to Kallstadt, a village with about 1,000 inhabitants. He discovered there was not enough business to earn a living. He was also approaching the age of eligibility for conscription to military service in the Imperial German Army. He decided to immigrate to the United States, later saying, "I agreed with my mother that I should go to America." Years later, his family members said that he departed secretly at night, leaving his mother a note. As a result of Trump fleeing mandatory conscription required of all citizens, a royal decree was issued banishing him from the country.

== Immigration to the United States ==
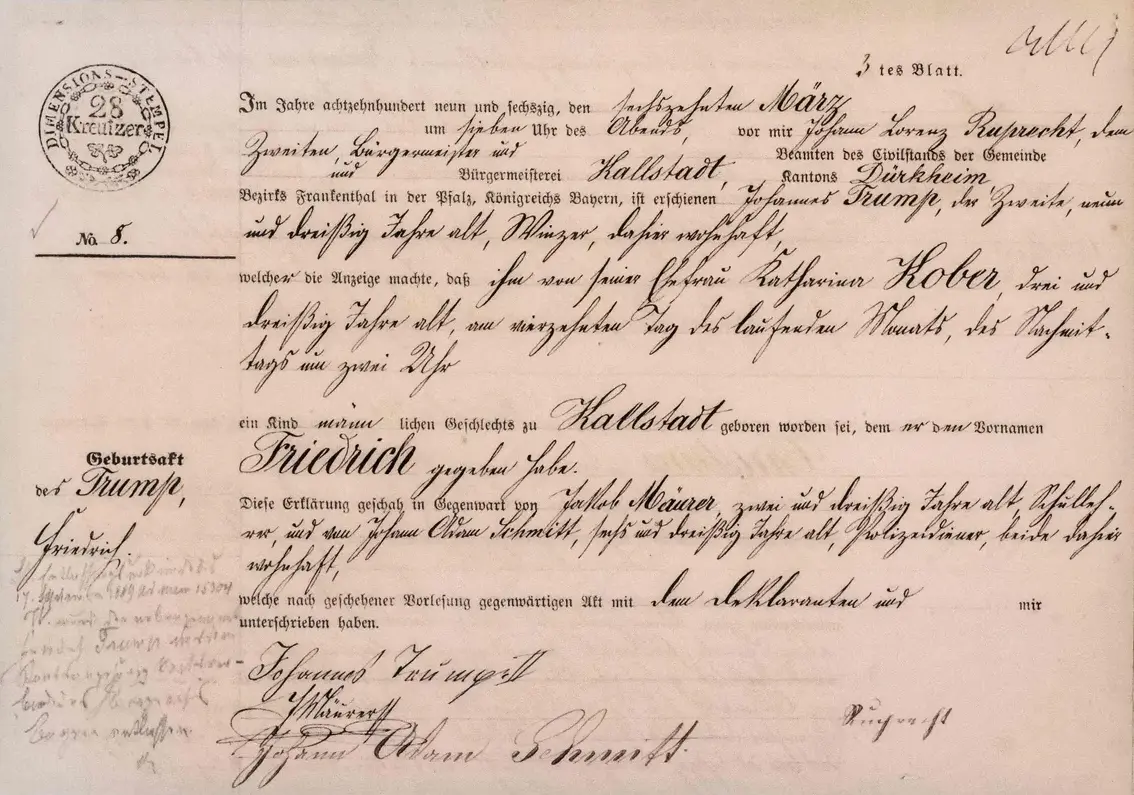
Birth certificate of Friedrich Trump

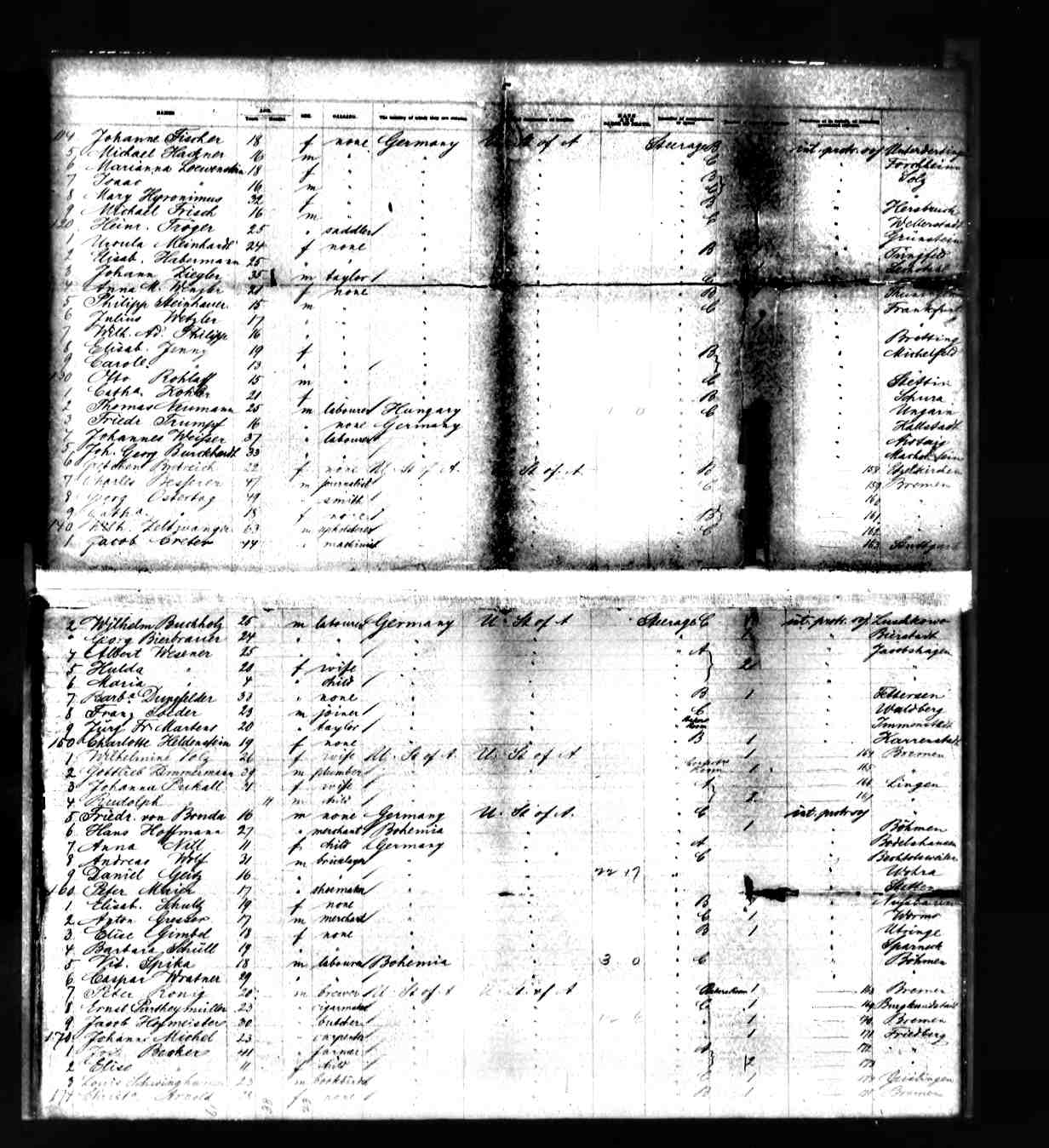
U.S. Immigration records. Line 133 notes "Friedr. Trumpf." age 16, born in Kallstadt, Germany.

In 1885, at age 16, Trump immigrated via Bremerhaven, Germany, to the United States aboard the steamship Eider, departing on October 7 and arriving at the Castle Garden Immigrant Landing Depot in New York City on October 19. As he had not yet served the mandatory military duty of two years in the Kingdom of Bavaria, this emigration was illegal under Bavarian law. U.S. immigration records list his name as "Friedr. Trumpf" and his occupation as "none". He moved in with his older sister Katharina – who had immigrated in 1883 – and her husband Fred Schuster, also from Kallstadt. Only a few hours after arriving, he met a German-speaking barber who was looking for an employee, and began working the following day. He worked as a barber for six years. Trump lived with his relatives on the Lower East Side of Manhattan in a neighborhood with many Palatine German immigrants, at 76 Forsyth Street. Due to the rising cost of operating at 76 Forsyth Street, they later moved to 606 East 17th Street and to 2012 2nd Avenue.

In 1891, Trump moved to Seattle, in the newly admitted U.S. state of Washington. With his life savings of several hundred dollars, he bought the Poodle Dog, which he renamed the Dairy Restaurant, and supplied it with new tables, chairs, and a range. Located at 208 Washington Street, the Dairy Restaurant was in the middle of Seattle's Pioneer Square; Washington Street was nicknamed "the Line" and included an assortment of saloons, casinos, and brothels. Biographer Gwenda Blair called it "a hotbed of sex, booze, and money, was the indisputable center of the action in Seattle." The restaurant served food and liquor and was advertised to include "Rooms for Ladies", a common euphemism for prostitution. In 1892, Trump became a U.S. citizen and voted in Washington's first presidential election. He lived in Seattle until early 1893.

On February 14, 1894, Trump sold the Dairy Restaurant, and in March, he moved to the emerging mining town of Monte Cristo, Washington, in Snohomish County north of Seattle. After evidence of mineral deposits had been discovered in 1889, Monte Cristo was expected to produce a fortune in gold and silver. Many prospectors moved to the area in hopes of becoming rich. Rumors about financial investments by millionaire John D. Rockefeller in the entire Everett area created an exaggerated expectation of the area's potential.

Before leaving Seattle, Trump bought 40 acres (16 ha) in the Pine Lake Plateau, twelve miles (19 km) east of the city, for $200, which was the first major real estate purchase of the Trump family. In Monte Cristo, Trump chose a plot of land near the later train station that he wanted to build a hotel on, but could not afford the $1,000-per-acre fee to purchase it. Instead, he filed a gold placer claim on the land, which allowed him to claim exclusive mineral rights to the land without having to pay for it, even though the land had already been claimed by Everett resident Nicholas Rudebeck. At that time, the United States General Land Office was known to be corrupt and frequently allowed such multiple claims. Despite the placer's claim providing Trump no right to build any structure on the land, he quickly bought lumber to build a new boarding house and operate it similarly to the Dairy Restaurant. He never tried to mine gold on the land. Blair described Trump as "mining the miners" since they needed a place to sleep at night while they were mining.In July 1894, Rudebeck filed to incorporate the land and sent an agent to collect rent; this was apparently unsuccessful since the people of Monte Cristo did not pay attention to legal titles. Trump finally bought the land in December 1894. While in Monte Cristo, Trump was elected in 1896 as justice of the peace by a 32-to-5 margin.

Years of mining had revealed that there was not nearly as much gold and silver in Monte Cristo as had once been believed, and in August 1894, Rockefeller pulled out of most of his investment in the area, creating the "Everett bubble burst." By the spring of 1896, most of the miners had left Monte Cristo. Trump suffered both from a shortage of workers and reduced business, although he had been one of the few people to make money in Monte Cristo. Trump prepared for the bubble burst by funding two miners in the Yukon, Canada, in exchange for them staking a claim for him. In July 1897, the Klondike Gold Rush began after boats loaded with gold arrived in San Francisco and Seattle. Thousands of people rushed to the area in hopes of making a fortune. Trump sold off most of his property in Monte Cristo a few weeks later and moved back to Seattle.

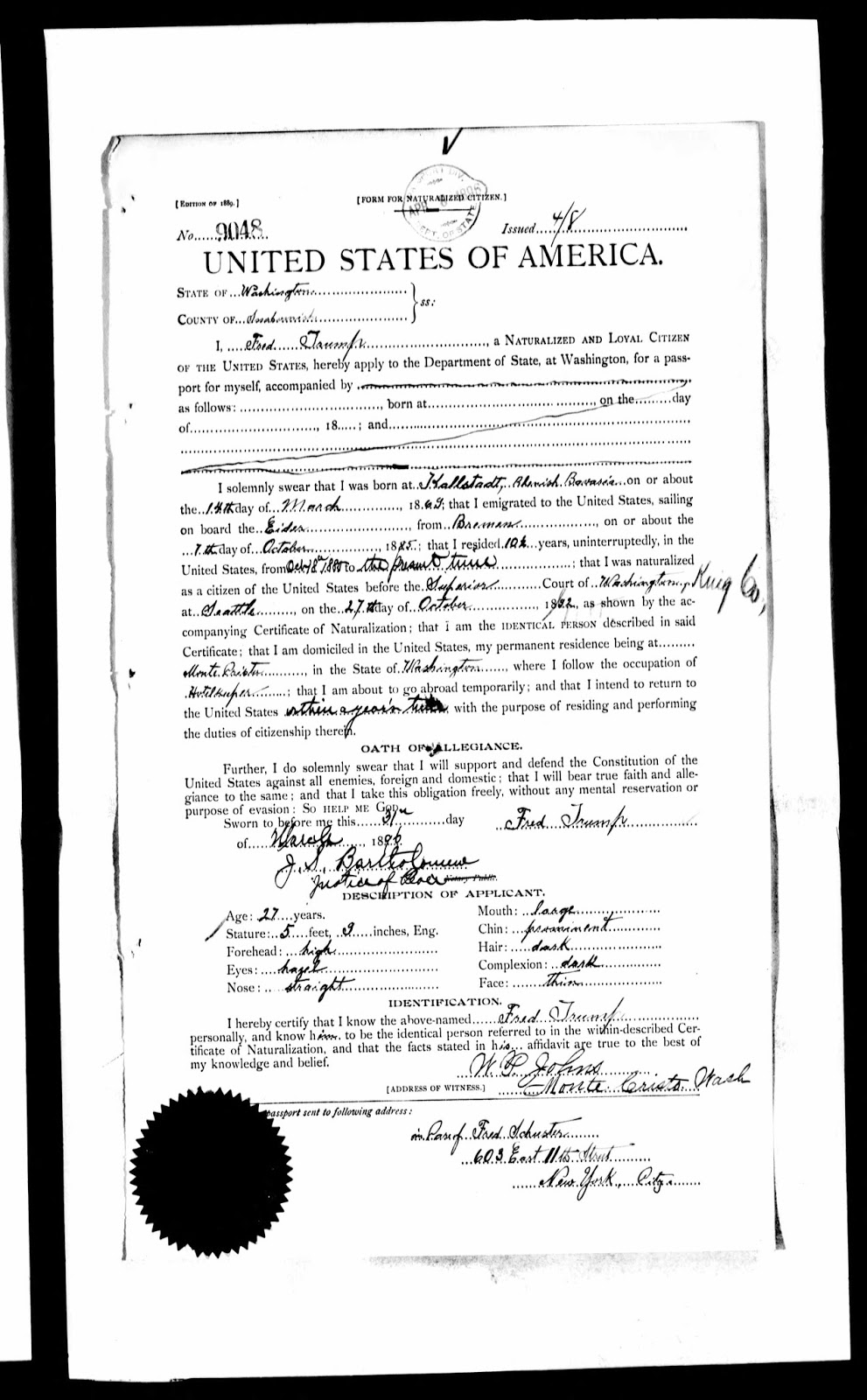
Passport application of Friedrich Trump, 1896

In Seattle, Trump opened a new restaurant at 207 Cherry Street. Business was so good that he paid off the mortgage in four weeks. Meanwhile, on 7 July, the two miners whom Trump had funded staked his claim at Hunker Creek, a tributary of the Klondike. After spending $15 to register the claim, they sold half of it for $400 the next day. A week later, another miner sold it for $1,000. On 20 September, they staked a second claim, at Deadwood Creek. Half of it was sold in October for $150, while the other half was sold in December for $2,000. It is, however, unknown if Trump ever received any money from there. By early 1898, he had made enough money to go to the Yukon himself.

He bought all the necessary supplies, sold off his remaining properties in Monte Cristo and Seattle, and transferred his 40 acres in the Pine Lake Plateau to his sister Louise. In 1900, Louise sold the property for $250. In the winter following Trump's departure from Monte Cristo, the town suffered some of the worst avalanches and floods in its short history, and this time, Rockefeller refused to reconstruct the almost vital railroad to Everett.

=== Yukon Gold Rush; Trump's hotels and brothels ===
According to Blair's account, when Trump left for the Yukon, he had no plans to do actual mining. He likely travelled the White Pass route, which included the notorious "Dead Horse trail", so named because drivers whipped animals of transport until they dropped dead on the trail and were left to decompose. In the spring of 1898, Trump and another miner named Ernest Levin opened a tent restaurant along the trail. Blair writes that "a frequent dish was fresh-slaughtered, quick-frozen horse".

In May 1898, Trump and Levin moved to Bennett, British Columbia, a town known for prospectors building boats in order to travel to Dawson. In Bennett, Trump and Levin opened the Arctic Restaurant and Hotel, which offered fine dining, lodging and sex in a sea of tents. The Arctic was also originally housed in a tent, but demand for the hotel and restaurant grew until it occupied a two-story building. A letter to the Yukon Sun newspaper described the Arctic:

For single men the Arctic has excellent accommodations as well as the best restaurant in Bennett, but I would not advise respectable women to go there to sleep as they are liable to hear that which would be repugnant to their feelings – and uttered, too, by the depraved of their own sex.

The Arctic House was one of the largest and most extravagant restaurants in that region of the Klondike, offering fresh fruit and ptarmigan in addition to the staple of horse meat. The Arctic was open 24 hours a day and advertised "Rooms for ladies", which included beds and scales for measuring gold dust. The local detachment of North-West Mounted Police were known to tolerate vice so long as it was conducted discreetly.

In 1900, the 111-mile (179 km) White Pass and Yukon Route, a railroad between Skagway, Alaska and Whitehorse, Yukon, was completed. Trump founded the White Horse Restaurant and Inn in Whitehorse. They moved the building by barge, relocated on Front Street, and were operational by June.

The new restaurant, which included one of the largest steel ranges in the area, prepared 3,000 meals per day and had space for gambling. Despite the enormous financial success, Trump and Levin began fighting due to Levin's drinking. They broke up their business relationship in February 1901, but reconciled in April. Around that time, the local government announced the suppression of prostitution, gambling and liquor, though the crackdown was delayed by businessmen until later that year. In light of this impending threat to his business operation, Trump sold his share of the restaurant to Levin and left the Yukon. In the months that followed, Levin was arrested for public drunkenness and sent to jail, and the Arctic was taken over by the Mounties. The restaurant burned down in the Whitehorse fire of 1905. Blair wrote that "once again, in a situation that created many losers, [Frederick Trump] managed to emerge a winner."

== Marriage and family ==
Trump returned to Kallstadt in 1901 as a wealthy man. Biographer Blair said that "the business of seeing to his customers' need for food, drink and female companionship had been good to him." He quickly met and proposed to Elisabeth Christ (1880–1966), the daughter of a former neighbor; she was eleven years younger than Trump. Trump's mother disapproved of Christ because she considered her family to be of a lower social class. Trump and Christ married on August 26, 1902, and moved to New York City.

In New York, Trump found work as a barber and manager of a restaurant-hotel. The couple lived at 1006 Westchester Avenue in the German-speaking Morrisania neighborhood of the Bronx. Their daughter Elizabeth was born on April 30, 1904. In May 1904, when Trump applied in New York for a U.S. passport to travel with his wife and his daughter, he listed his profession as "hotelkeeper". Due to Elizabeth Sr.'s extreme homesickness, the family returned to Germany later that year. In Germany, Trump deposited into a bank his life's savings of 80,000 marks, equivalent to $677,797 in 2025.

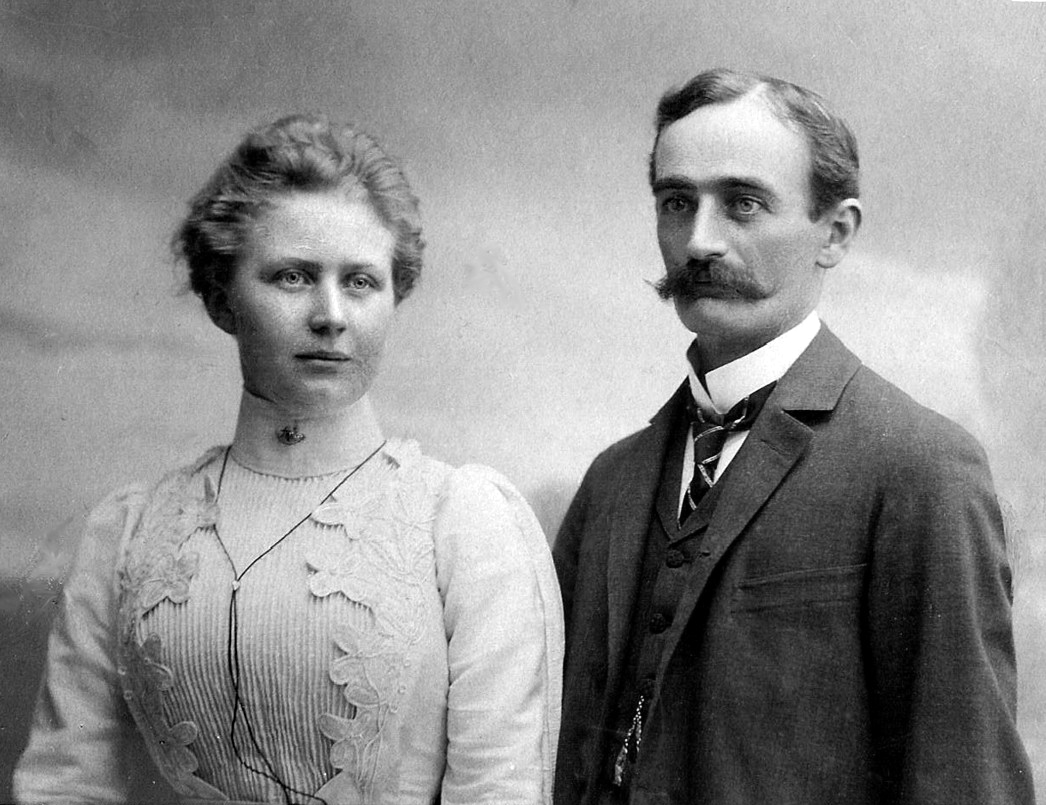
Elizabeth Christ and Frederick Trump, 1902

Soon after the family arrived in Germany, Bavarian authorities determined that Trump had emigrated from Germany to avoid his military-service obligations, and he was classified as a draft dodger. On 24 December 1904 the Department of Interior announced an investigation to banish Trump from Germany. Officially, they found that he had violated the Resolution of the Royal Ministry of the Interior number 9916, an 1886 law that punished immigration to North America to avoid military service with the loss of Bavarian and thus German citizenship. In February 1905, a royal decree was issued ordering Trump to leave within eight weeks due to having emigrated to evade military service and failing to register his departure with the authorities. For several months, Trump petitioned Luitpold, Prince Regent of Bavaria and the government to allow him to stay, but he was unsuccessful.

He and his family departed for New York on 30 June 1905. Their son Fred was born on 11 October 1905, in the Bronx, New York. The family lived at 539 East 177th Street. In 1907, their second son, John, was born. Later that year the family moved to Woodhaven, Queens. While living in Queens, Trump opened a barber shop at 60 Wall Street in Manhattan.

== Later life and death ==
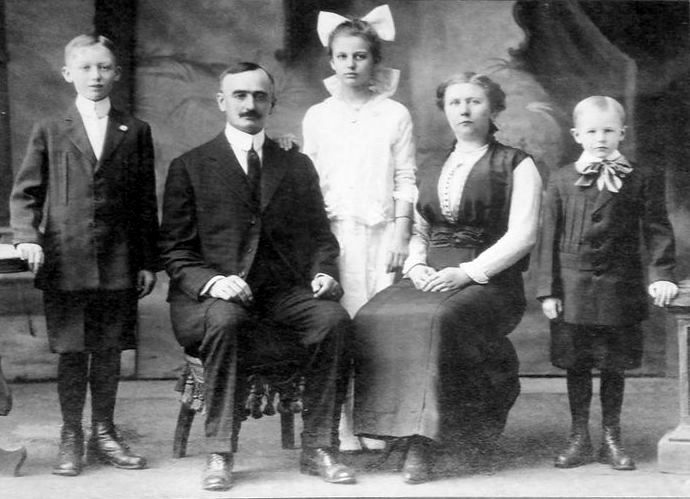
Frederick Trump (2nd from left) with his family, c. 1915

In 1908, Trump bought real estate on Jamaica Avenue in Woodhaven. Two years later, he moved his family into the building on the land, renting out several rooms. He also worked as a hotel manager at the Medallion Hotel on 6th Avenue and 23rd Street. Trump intended to continue buying more land, but during World War I he kept a low profile because of the pervasive anti-German sentiment in the US due to the war. German-born citizens came under suspicion.

According to the Trump family biographer Gwenda Blair, "on May 29, 1918, while walking with his son Fred, Trump suddenly felt extremely sick and was rushed to bed. The next day, he was dead. What was first diagnosed as pneumonia turned out to be one of the early cases of the Spanish flu." Contrarily, according to his death certificate, Trump had been attended by a doctor since May 23, 1918, and died on the morning of May 30 from pneumonia and, secondarily, nephritis.

Sources differ on the size of Trump's estate: Gwenda Blair states that his net holdings included a 2-story, 7-room home in Queens; 5 vacant lots; $4,000 in savings; $3,600 in stocks; and 14 mortgages, placing his net worth at $31,359 ($671,235), while his great-granddaughter Mary L. Trump placed it at the equivalent of $300,000 in 2021. Trump's wife and son Fred continued his real estate projects under the name Elizabeth Trump & Son.

== Earlier recorded forms of the family name ==
U.S. immigration records from October 1885 list his name as Friedr. Trumpf. An early recorded appearance of the name "Trump" appears 25 years later in the 1910 United States census records. In her book The Trumps, biographer Gwenda Blair mentions a Hanns Drumpf who settled in Kallstadt in 1608 and whose descendants changed their name from Drumpf to Trump during the Thirty Years' War. A 2015 Deutsche Welle article claims Blair said in an interview that Trump's grandfather was named Friedrich Drumpf, which contradicts the statement in Blair's earlier book. According to Kallstadt's transportation association, "Drumpf" was the original spelling of the family's surname but that it had already been changed to "Trump" before this spelling was recorded in the population register produced by the French annexation of the Left Bank of the Rhine (from 1798 to 1814). The fact-checking website Snopes presents sources showing the family name was once "Drumpf" and showing the aforementioned contradictory reporting of Blair's opinion on whether Frederick Trump first used "Drumpf" but also showing that neither Donald Trump nor his father ever had the surname Drumpf.

== See also ==
- The Trumps: Three Generations That Built an Empire

== Works cited ==
- Trump, Fred C. (2024). All in the family : the Trumps and how we got this way. Gallery Books. ISBN 978-1-6680-7217-2.
