= George Uhrl =

United States Army soldier

George Uhrie
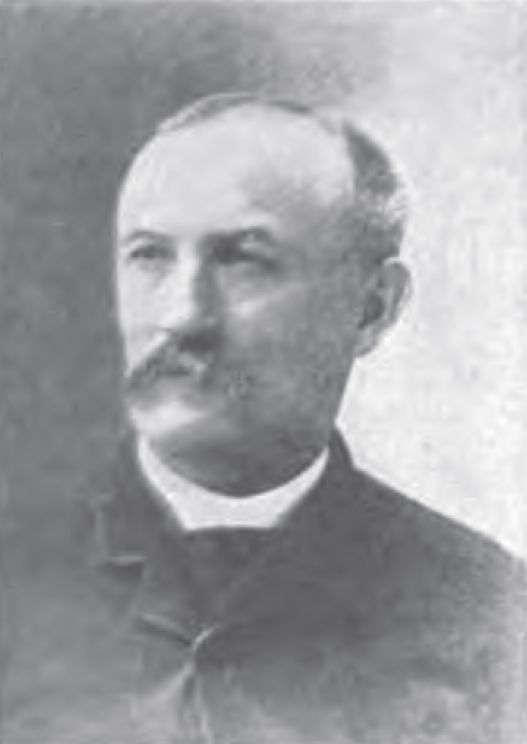
- Born: October 21, 1838; Baden, Germany
- Died: September 28, 1911 (aged 72)
- Burial place: Middle Village, Queens
- Military career
- Allegiance: United States
- Branch: United States Army
- Service years: 1856 - 1886
- Rank: Sergeant
- Unit: 5th Artillery Regiment
- Conflicts: American Civil War • Battle of White Oak Swamp
- Awards: Medal of Honor

George Uhrie (often misspelled Uhrl and also spelled as Uhri) (October 21, 1838 – September 28, 1911) was a United States Army soldier and a recipient of America's highest military decoration, the Medal of Honor.

== Early life and military service ==
George Uhri was born on October 21, 1838, in the Grand Duchy of Baden, to Mr. Uhri and Mary Uhri. He came to the United States in 1855.

On February 9, 1856, at the age of 17, he joined the Army in New York and was assigned to Battery G, 2nd US Artillery and served during the Seminole Indian War in Florida from 1856 to 1857, and later in 1857 and 1858 against the Crows and Sioux in Minnesota. He became a citizen of the United States of America on December 15, 1860.

== Civil War service ==
In 1860 he was assigned as a sergeant with Light Battery F, 3rd US Artillery and was transferred in 1861 to Light Battery F, 5th Regiment, US Artillery and served until 1865.

During the war, he participated in the following battles: Lee's Mills, Virginia, Gelding's Farm, White Oak Swamp, Virginia, Malvern Hill, Virginia - 1862; South Mountain, Antietam, Maryland, Fredericksburg, Virginia - 1862, Chancellorsville, Virginia, Rappahannock Station, Virginia, Gettysburg, Pennsylvania - 1863; siege of Petersburg, Virginia, Chapin's Farm, Virginia - 1864; siege and capture of Richmond, Virginia from 1864 to 1865.

== Medal of Honor action ==
At the Battle of White Oak Swamp on June 30, 1862, while serving with the Light Battery F, 5th U.S. Artillery, was in a party of three that protected a field gun, belonging to another battery that was deserted by its officers and men. For his conduct on this occasion, he was awarded the Medal of Honor on April 4, 1898.

Uhri's official Medal of Honor citation reads:

Was 1 of a party of 3 who, under heavy fire of advancing enemy, voluntarily secured and saved from capture a field gun belonging to another battery, and which had been deserted by its officers and men. .

On December 12, 1874, while Uhri was stationed at Fort Adams in Newport, Rhode Island, Uhri's son, Franklin A. Uhri, died at Fort Adams and was buried in the fort's cemetery.

== Later career ==
George Uhri retired from the Army on December 31, 1886. He then served as a New York City police officer from 1893 to 1904. On February 11, 1904, he requested to be relieved the force and was granted an annual pension of $500.00. In 1905, he was living at 43 West 42nd Street, New York, New York.

== Family ==
George Uhri was married at Richmond, Virginia on October 8, 1866, to Caroline Lena Ernst. Caroline was born in Virginia. The couple had seven children, Franklin, Joseph, Richard, Edward, William, George and Arthur. Two of his sons, Arthur (b 1869) and Edward Henry Uhri, were born in Rhode Island. George E. was born about 1869 in Washington, D.C. Franklin, Richard, William and Joseph's birthplaces are not known. Edward was born on July 9, 1875, and died in Florida. His godfather was financier J.P. Morgan.

== Death ==
Uhri died on September 28, 1911, at 3:20 a.m., from a brain concussion at age 73. On October 7, 1911, a letter from the War Department was sent to the mayor of New York City requesting confirmation of the date, place and cause of Uhri's death. George Uhri was buried in the Lutheran Cemetery, Middle Village, New York on October 1, 1911.

His widow died on September 13, 1914, of acute bronchial pneumonia in New York City and was buried beside her husband.
