= Trump family =

American business and political family

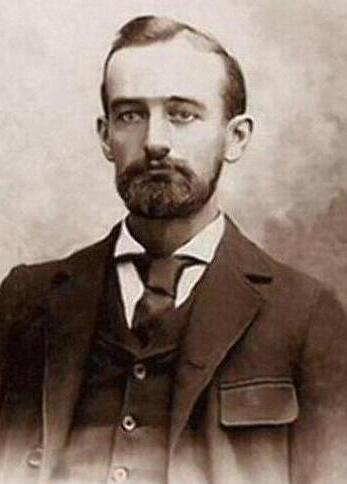
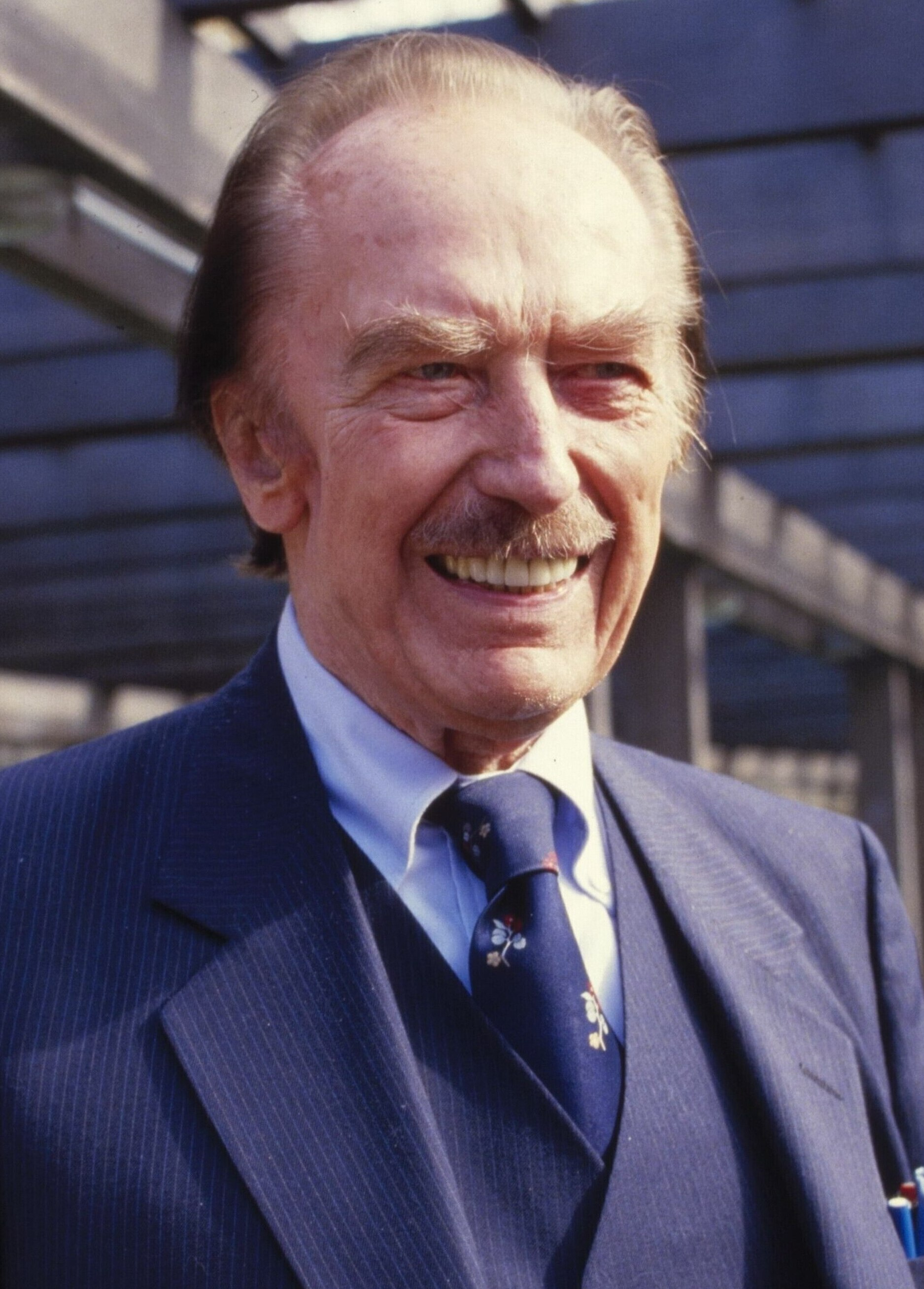
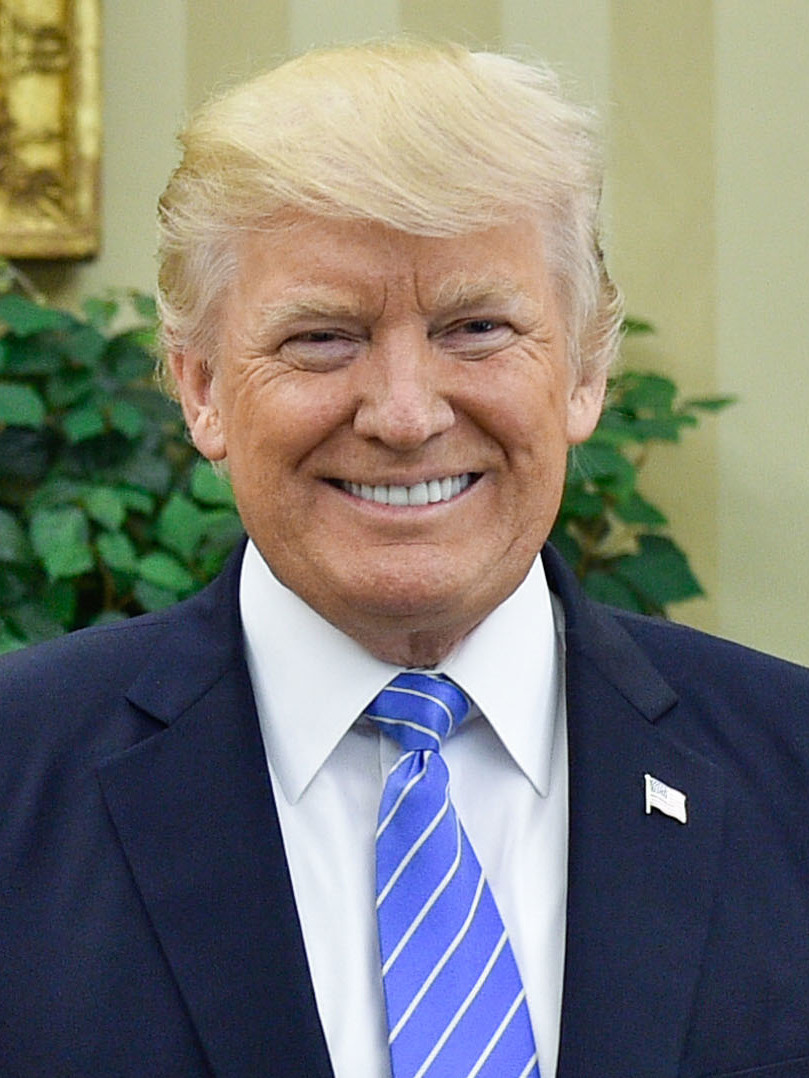
- Frederick Trump Fred Trump Donald Trump
- Current region: New York City and Palm Beach, Florida, U.S.
- Origin: Kallstadt, Kingdom of Bavaria
- Founder: Frederick Trump
- Current head: Donald Trump
- Titles: List: President of the United States (45th & 47th); First Lady of the United States; Director of the Office of Economic Initiatives and Entrepreneurship; Advisor to the President; Federal judge (of the District Court for the District of New Jersey and the Court of Appeals for the Third Circuit); Senior judge of the United States Court of Appeals for the Third Circuit; Co-Chair of the Republican National Committee
- Members: List: Frederick; Fred; Maryanne; Fred Jr.; Fred III; Mary; Donald; Donald Jr.; Kai; Ivanka; Eric; Tiffany; Barron; Robert; John
- Connected members: Elizabeth Christ Trump; Mary Anne Trump; John W. Walter; Melania Trump; Jared Kushner; Lara Trump; Michael Boulos
- Connected families: Clan MacLeod; Kushner family

The Trump family is an American family active in business, entertainment, politics, and real estate. The best-known member is Donald Trump, the 45th and current 47th president of the United States (2017–2021, 2025–present).

The Trumps are of German descent. Prominent members include Donald Trump's father Fred Trump, and grandfather Frederick Trump.

== Immediate family ==
=== Wives ===
==== Ivana Trump ====
Ivana Marie Trump (née Zelníčková), the first wife of Donald Trump, was born on February 20, 1949, in Zlín, Czechoslovakia (now Czech Republic). She was a fashion model and businesswoman who became a naturalized U.S. citizen in 1988. They were married from 1977 until 1990. Ivana died in 2022 of blunt impact injuries to the torso after falling down stairs at her home on the Upper East Side of Manhattan.

Ivana was a senior executive of the Trump Organization for seven years, including executive vice president for interior design. She led the interior design of Trump Tower with its signature pink marble. Ivana was appointed CEO and president of the Trump Castle Hotel and Casino in Atlantic City and later became the manager of the Plaza Hotel in Manhattan.

==== Marla Maples ====
Marla Ann Maples, the second wife of Donald Trump, was born on October 27, 1963, in Cohutta, Georgia, U.S. She was an actress, television personality, model, singer and presenter. They married in December 1993, two months after the birth of their daughter Tiffany, separated in 1997 and divorced in 1999.

==== Melania Trump ====
Melania Trump (née Knauss), the third and current wife of Donald Trump, was born on April 26, 1970, in Novo Mesto, Yugoslavia (now Slovenia). She had a lengthy modeling career and is the second foreign-born first lady of the United States, the first being Louisa Adams. They were married in 2005. Melania became a naturalized U.S. citizen on July 28, 2006. She did not immediately move into the White House when her husband became president, but remained at Trump Tower with their son Barron Trump until the end of the 2016–2017 school year. Melania and her son moved to the White House on June 11, 2017.

=== Children ===
Trump has five children from three marriages: Don Jr., Ivanka, and Eric Trump with Ivana Trump; Tiffany Trump with Marla Maples; and Barron with Melania Trump.

==== First marriage ====
Donald Jr., Ivanka, and Eric are Trump's three eldest children, from his first marriage with Ivana Trump.

Prior to the election, each of the siblings held the title of executive vice president at the Trump Organization. During the campaign, they served as surrogates for their father on national news programs. Following Trump's election victory, all three were named to the presidential transition team.

Following the inauguration, Donald Jr. and Eric took charge of the family's real estate empire. Ivanka moved to Washington, D.C., with her husband Jared Kushner, who was appointed to a senior White House advisory position.

==== Second marriage ====
Tiffany Ariana Trump (born October 13, 1993) is Donald Trump's only child with Marla Maples. In 2016, she participated little in her father's campaign because she was studying sociology and urban studies at the University of Pennsylvania. Shortly after graduating, she made a supportive speech for her father at the Republican National Convention at age 22. She was awarded a J.D. degree from Georgetown University Law Center in Washington, D.C., in May 2020.

==== Third marriage ====
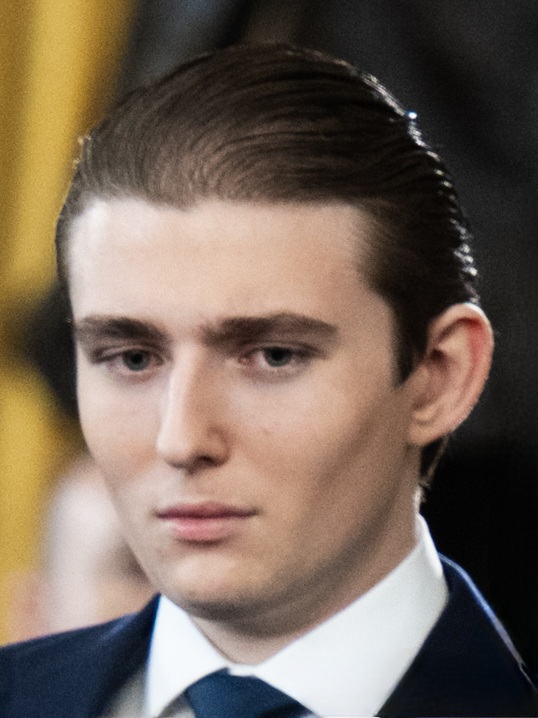
Barron Trump in 2025

Barron William Trump (born March 20, 2006) is Trump's youngest child and his only child with Melania Trump. In May 2006, Barron was baptized at the Episcopal church of Bethesda-by-the-Sea in Palm Beach, Florida. He attended the Columbia Grammar & Preparatory School in Manhattan and Oxbridge Academy in West Palm Beach, Florida. Currently, he attends Leonard N. Stern School of Business of New York University in Manhattan. In addition to English, Barron is fluent in Slovene.

Trump was an apolitical figure during his father's presidencies, attracting media attention despite attempts by Melania to distance her son from politics. Following the end of his father's first term, he moved to Florida and graduated in May 2024 from Oxbridge Academy in West Palm Beach. Trump was invited to become an at-large delegate for Florida at the 2024 Republican National Convention, but he declined.

=== Grandchildren ===
Trump has 11 grandchildren. Son Donald Trump Jr. and his former wife Vanessa have five children, the eldest of whom is Kai; daughter Ivanka Trump and her husband Jared Kushner have three; son Eric Trump and his wife Lara have two; and daughter Tiffany Trump and her husband Michael Boulos have one.

== Ancestry ==
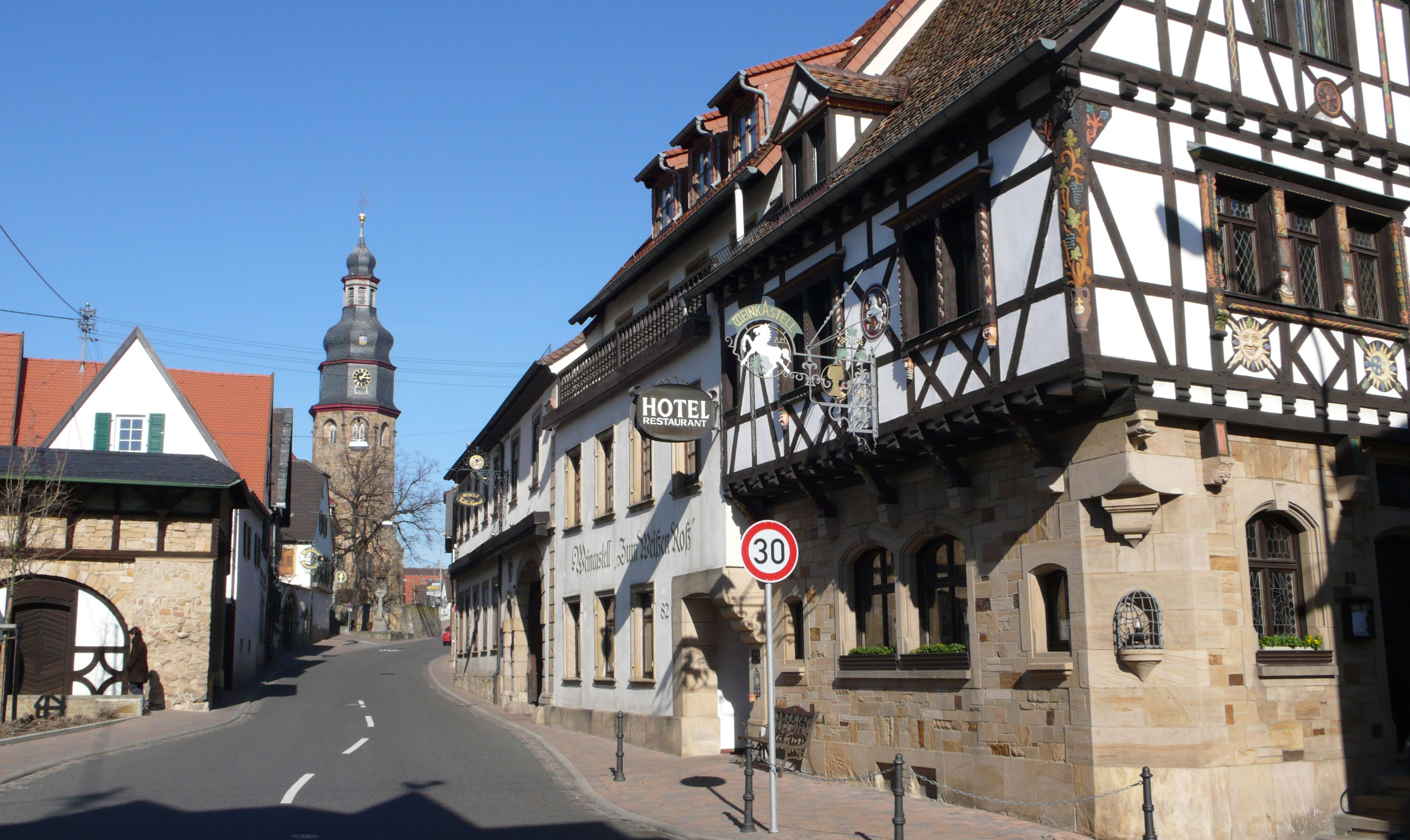
Kallstadt, Germany, the Trump family's ancestral home

According to biographer Gwenda Blair, the family descended from an itinerant lawyer, Hanns Drumpf, who settled in Kallstadt, a village in the Electoral Palatinate of the Holy Roman Empire, in 1608, and whose descendants changed their name from Drumpf to Trump during the Thirty Years' War (1618–1648). The last name Trump is on record in Kallstadt since the 18th century. Journalist Kate Connolly, visiting Kallstadt, found several variations in spelling of the surname in the village archives, including Drumb, Tromb, Tromp, Trum, Trumpff, and Dromb.

Johannes Trump, born in the nearby village of Bobenheim am Berg in 1789, had established himself by the early 1830s as a winegrower in Kallstadt, which had then become part of Kingdom of Bavaria, where his grandson, Friedrich Trump, the grandfather of Donald Trump, was born in 1869. Several of his descendants also were vintners in Kallstadt, one of many villages in the famous wine-growing region of the Palatinate (Pfalz). Johannes Trump's sister Charlotte Louisa married Johann Georg Heinz. They were grandparents of Heinz company founder Henry J. Heinz (1844–1919).

This German heritage was long concealed by Donald Trump's father, Fred Trump, who had grown up in a mainly German-speaking environment until he was ten years old; after World War II and until the 1980s, he told people he was of Swedish ancestry. Donald Trump repeated this version in The Art of the Deal (1987) but in 1999 said he is "proud" of his German heritage, and served as grand marshal of the 1999 German-American Steuben Parade in New York City.

The Trump family in Germany were Lutheran. Donald Trump's parents attended First Presbyterian Church in Jamaica, Queens, where Trump was confirmed in 1959.

=== Family tree ===
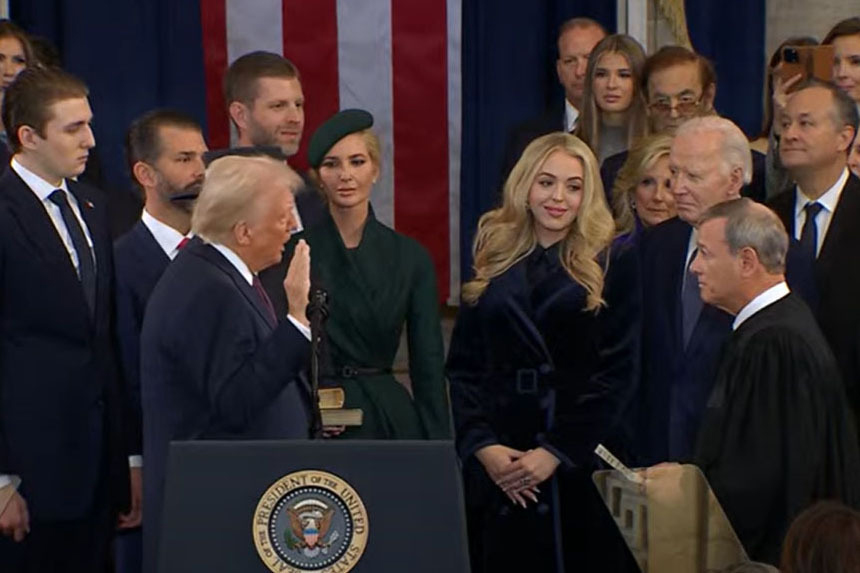
From left to right: Barron Trump, Donald Trump Jr., Eric Trump, Ivanka Trump, Tiffany Trump, and Kai Trump (behind Tiffany) at Donald Trump's 2025 inauguration.

- Johann Paul Trump (1727–1792), married Maria Elisabetha Setzer
  - Charlotte Louisa Trump (1789–1833), married Johann Georg Heinz
    - John Henry Heinz (1811–1891), immigrated to the United States in 1840, married Anna Margaretha Schmidt (1822–1899), emigrated to the United States in 1840
      - Henry John Heinz (1844–1919), founder of the Heinz company
        - Howard Heinz (1877–1941)
          - Henry John “Jack” Heinz II (1908–1987), CEO of H. J. Heinz Company, married and divorced Joan Diehl (1911–1999)
            - Henry John Heinz III, Congressman and later United States Senator from Pennsylvania (1938–1991), married Teresa Simões-Ferreira (b. 1938), who herself married John Kerry
              - André Heinz (b. 1969)
              - Christopher Heinz (b. 1973)
  - Johannes Trump (1789–1835), married Susanna Maria Bechtloff
    - Johannes Trump Jr. (1829–1877), married Katharina Kober (1836–1922)
      - Friedrich Trump (1869–1918), barber, restaurant and hotel manager, immigrated to the United States in 1885/1905, and married to Elisabeth Christ (1880–1966) who herself immigrated to the United States in 1902/1905.
        - Elizabeth (Elisabeth) Trump (1904–1961), married William Otto Walter
          - William Trump Walter (1931–2020)
          - John Whitney Walter (1934–2018), referred to as the Trump "family historian", 14th Mayor of Flower Hill, New York, and later its village historian, married Joan Smith
            - Christine Walter
            - Nancy Walter
            - Cindy Walter
        - Frederick Christ "Fred" Trump (1905–1999), real estate developer, married Mary MacLeod (1912–2000) who had immigrated to the United States from Scotland in 1930.
          - Maryanne Trump (1937–2023), federal judge, married/divorced David Desmond; married John Barry
            - David William Desmond, married Lisa Aitken
          - Frederick Crist "Freddy" Trump Jr. (1938–1981), TWA pilot, married/divorced Linda Clapp
            - Frederick Crist "Fritz" Trump III (born 1962) married Lisa Beth Lorant
              - Cristopher Trump
              - Andrea Trump
              - William Trump
            - Mary Lea Trump (born 1965), psychologist, author, married/divorced Dina Nowak;married: Ronda Cress
              - Avary Trump
          - Elizabeth Joan Trump (born 1942), married James Walter Grau
          - Donald John Trump (born 1946), real estate developer, 45th and 47th president of the United States, married/divorced Ivana Zelníčková (1949–2022); married/divorced Marla Maples; married Melania Knauss
            - Donald John Trump Jr. (born 1977; of first marriage), married/divorced Vanessa Haydon; married Bettina Anderson
              - Kai Madison Trump (born 2007; of first marriage)
              - Donald John Trump III (born 2009; of first marriage)
              - Tristan Milos Trump (born 2011; of first marriage)
              - Spencer Frederick Trump (born 2012; of first marriage)
              - Chloe Sophia Trump (born 2014; of first marriage)
            - Ivana Marie "Ivanka" Trump (born 1981; of first marriage), married Jared Kushner
              - Arabella Rose Kushner (born 2011)
              - Joseph Frederick Kushner (born 2013)
              - Theodore James Kushner (born 2016)
            - Eric Frederick Trump (born 1984; of first marriage), married Lara Yunaska
              - Eric Luke Trump (born 2017)
              - Carolina Dorothy Trump (born 2019)
            - Tiffany Ariana Trump (born 1993; of second marriage), married Michael Boulos
              - Alexander Trump Boulos (born 2025)
            - Barron William Trump (born 2006; of third marriage)
          - Robert Stewart Trump (1948–2020), married/divorced Blaine Beard; married Ann Marie Pallan
        - John George Trump (1907–1985), married Elora Gordon Sauerbrun (1913–1983)
          - John Gordon Trump (1938–2012)
          - Christine Elora Trump Philp (1942–2021)
          - Karen Elizabeth Trump Ingraham (b. 1949)

Select family tree of the Trump family

Fred Trump; 1905–1999	Mary Anne MacLeod; 1912–2000
Maryanne Trump; 1937–2023	Fred Trump Jr. 1938–1981	Elizabeth Trump; 1942–present	Robert Trump; 1948–2020	Marla Maples; 1963–present	Donald Trump; 1946–present	Ivana Zelníčková; 1949–2022	Melanija Knavs; 1970–present
Michael Boulos; 1997–present	Tiffany Trump; 1993–present	Vanessa Haydon; 1977–present	Donald Trump Jr. 1977–present	Jared Kushner; 1981–present	Ivanka Trump; 1981–present	Eric Trump; 1984–present	Lara Yunaska; 1982–present	Barron Trump; 2006–present

== Parents ==
=== Fred Trump ===
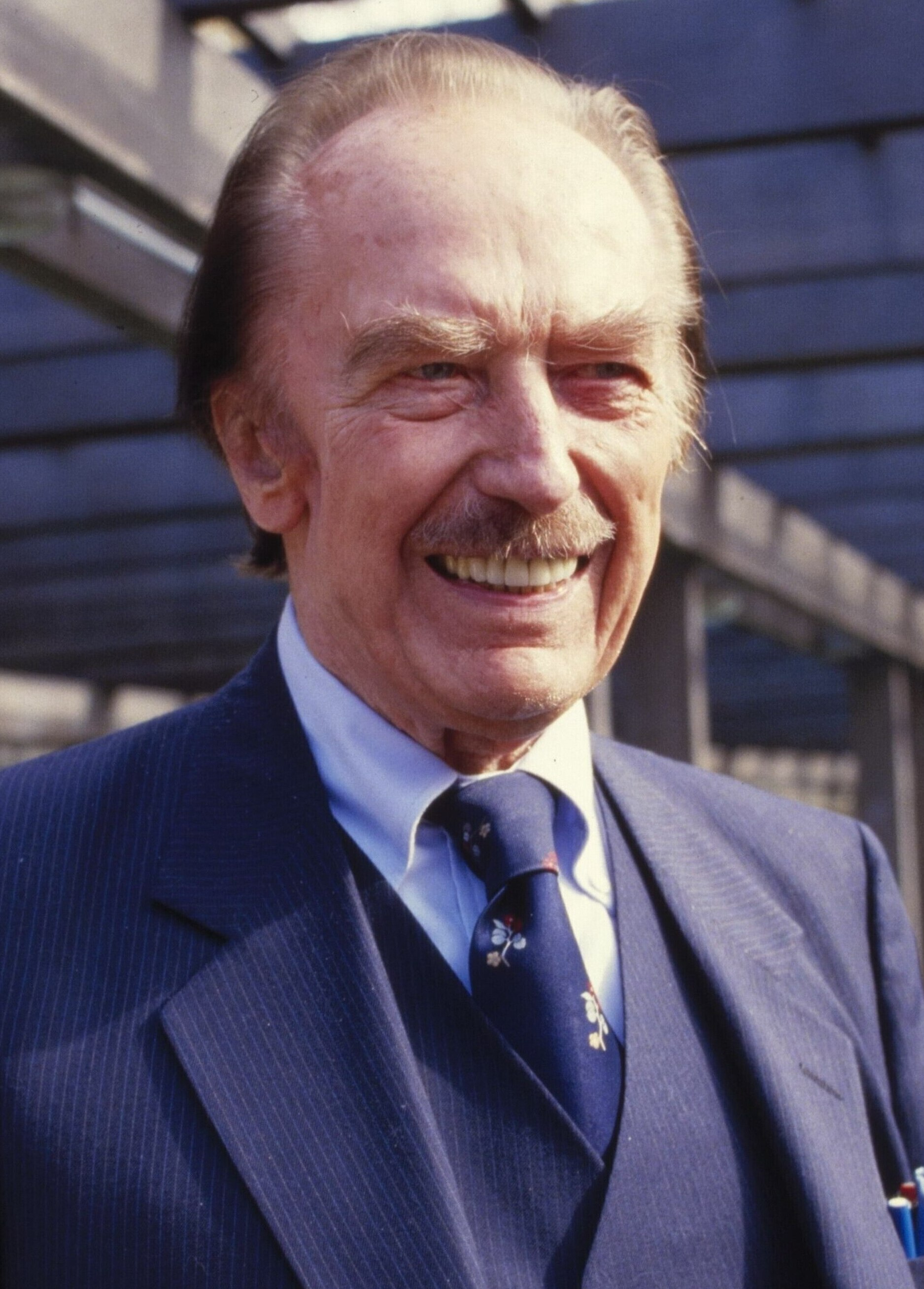
Fred Trump in 1986

Donald Trump's father, Fred Trump (1905–1999), born in New York, was a successful real estate developer in New York City. Using their inheritance, Fred Trump and his mother Elizabeth founded E. Trump & Son in 1927. The company grew to build and manage single-family houses in Queens, barracks and garden apartments for U.S. Navy personnel near major shipyards along the East Coast, and more than 27,000 apartments in New York City. Trump was investigated by a U.S. Senate committee for profiteering in 1954, and again by the State of New York in 1966.

Donald Trump became the president of his father's real estate business in 1971, and renamed it the Trump Organization around 1973. That year, Donald and his father were sued by the U.S. Justice Department's Civil Rights Division for violating the Fair Housing Act. In the mid-1970s, Donald received loans from his father exceeding $14 million (later claimed by Donald to have been only $1 million). Donald served as the Trump Organization's chairman and president until assuming the office of U.S. president.

=== Mary Anne MacLeod Trump ===
Born as Mary Anne MacLeod (1912–2000) in Tong, a small village near Stornoway, in the Western Isles of Scotland, she was a daughter of fisherman Malcolm MacLeod and Mary MacLeod (née Smith). At age 17, she immigrated to the United States with $50 (equivalent to $938 in 2025), and moved in with a sister before starting work as a maid in New York. Mary and Fred Trump met in New York and married in 1936, settling together in Queens. Mary became a U.S. citizen in 1942. While visiting Scotland in June 2008, Donald Trump said in part, "I think I do feel Scottish."

== Grandparents ==
=== Frederick Trump ===
In 1885, Donald Trump's grandfather, Friedrich Trump, emigrated from Kallstadt, Palatinate (then part of the Kingdom of Bavaria), to the United States at age 16. He anglicized his name to Frederick in 1892 when he became a U.S. citizen. During the Klondike Gold Rush, he amassed a fortune by opening a restaurant and hotel in Bennett and later Whitehorse, serving gold seekers on their way to the region; one biographer wrote that the business included a brothel, a portrayal Donald Trump has said was "totally false".

Returning on a visit to Kallstadt in 1901, Frederick fell in love with Elisabeth Christ. They were married in 1902, and moved back to the US. She became homesick so they returned to Germany. However, the authorities blocked his attempts to settle there and he was exiled by Germany in 1905 for his lack of mandatory military service and not giving authorities notice before his 1885 departure; an appeal was denied. He died in the first wave of the Spanish flu pandemic in 1918. After his death, his fortune was passed on to his wife and son.

=== Elizabeth Christ Trump ===
Donald Trump's grandmother, Elizabeth Christ Trump, was born in 1880 and died on June 6, 1966. She married Frederick Trump in 1902 and moved to the United States with him. Like her husband, she was a native of Kallstadt, born as the daughter of Philipp and Marie Christ. Philipp Christ was descended from Johannes Christ of Flörsheim, Hesse. Elizabeth Christ Trump was a descendant of organ builder Johann Michael Hartung through her paternal grandmother Sabina Christ.

== Siblings ==
=== Maryanne Trump Barry ===
Maryanne Trump Barry (1937–2023) was Donald Trump's eldest sister. She was a senior federal judge on the Third Circuit Court of Appeals, became inactive in 2017 after her brother took office, and retired in 2019.

=== Fred Trump Jr. ===
Frederick "Freddy" Crist Trump Jr. (1938–1981) was Donald Trump's older brother. On September 26, 1981, at the age of 42, he died from a heart attack.

=== Elizabeth Trump Grau ===
Elizabeth Joan Trump Grau (born 1942) is an older sister of Donald Trump. In 1989, she married film producer James Grau. She worked as an administrative assistant for Chase Manhattan Bank, before retiring to Florida. As of 2026, she is the only living sibling of Donald Trump.

=== Robert Trump ===
Robert Stewart Trump (1948–2020) was Donald Trump's younger brother. He was a business executive who managed Trump Management Inc, the Trump Organization's real estate holdings outside Manhattan. He was an investor in SHiRT LLC, one of two owners of Virginia-based CertiPathx which was awarded a $33-million government contract in 2019.

Robert Trump married Blaine Beard in 1980. They were divorced in 2009 after he had left his wife for Trump Organization employee Ann Marie Pallan. He married Pallan in early 2020. Robert died on August 15, 2020, at the age of 71. According to The New York Times, he had been having brain bleeds after a recent fall.

== Other relatives ==
=== John G. Trump ===
Donald Trump's paternal uncle, John George Trump (1907–1985), was an electrical engineer, inventor and physicist who developed rotational radiation therapy, and, together with Robert J. Van de Graaff, one of the first million-volt X-ray generators. He was awarded the National Medal of Science by President Ronald Reagan and was a member of the National Academy of Engineering.

=== John W. Walter ===
Donald Trump's first cousin John W. Walter (1934–2018) was a son of father Fred's sister Elizabeth Trump and William Walter. He worked for the Trump Organization for most of his life and was executive vice president of Trump Management, Inc. He shared ownership of All County Building Supply & Maintenance Corp with Donald Trump, Maryanne Trump Barry, Elizabeth Trump Grau, and Robert Trump. Walter also served as the mayor of Flower Hill, New York, between 1988 and 1996, and as its historian from 1996 until his death in 2018.

=== Mary L. Trump ===
Donald Trump's niece, Mary L. Trump, is a clinical psychologist, businessperson, and author. She has been a vocal critic of Donald Trump, and wrote a book about him and the family titled Too Much and Never Enough (2020).

=== Fred Trump III ===
Donald Trump's nephew, Fred Trump III, is a businessperson, author, and advocate for people with disabilities. He criticized Donald Trump in a 2024 memoir and has been a vocal critic of him since its publication.

== Summary table ==
Birth	Death	Image	Name	Relationship to Donald Trump	Nationality	Office	Occupation	Ref.
1869	1918		Frederick Trump	Paternal grandfather of Donald Trump	German		Barber, restaurateur and brothel operator	
1880	1966		Elizabeth Christ Trump	Paternal grandmother of Donald Trump	German-American		Real estate businessperson	
1905	1999		Fred Trump	Father of Donald Trump	American		Real estate developer and businessperson	
1907	1985		John G. Trump	Uncle of Donald Trump	American		Electrical engineer, inventor and physicist	
1912	2000		Mary Anne MacLeod Trump	Mother of Donald Trump	Scottish-American		Domestic worker	
1934	2018		John W. Walter	First cousin of Donald Trump	American	14th Mayor of Flower Hill, New York	Historian, engineer, businessman, author, and politician	
1937	2023		Maryanne Trump Barry	Sister of Donald Trump	American	Judge of the United States Court of Appeals for the Third Circuit	Attorney, judge	
1938	1981		Fred Trump Jr.	Brother of Donald Trump	American		Pilot	
1946	–		Donald Trump	Himself	American	45th and 47th President of the United States	Politician, media personality and businessperson	
1948	2020		Robert Trump	Brother of Donald Trump	American		Businessperson	
1949	2022		Ivana Trump	First wife of Donald Trump	Czech and American		Businessperson	
1962	–		Fred Trump III	Nephew of Donald Trump	American		Businessperson, author, and advocate for people with disabilities	
1963	–		Marla Maples	Second wife of Donald Trump	American		Actress, television personality, model, singer and presenter	
1965	–		Mary L. Trump	Niece of Donald Trump	American		Psychologist and author	
1970	–		Melania Trump	Third wife of Donald Trump	Slovene and American	First Lady of the United States	Model and businessperson	
1977	–		Donald Trump Jr.	Son of Donald Trump and Ivana	American		Political activist, businessperson, author and former television presenter	
1981	–		Ivanka Trump	Daughter of Donald Trump and Ivana	American	Advisor to the President	Businessperson and former political staffer	
1984	–		Eric Trump	Son of Donald Trump and Ivana	American		Businessperson, activist and former reality television presenter	
1993	–		Tiffany Trump	Daughter of Donald Trump and Marla Maples	American		Legal research assistant	
2006	–		Barron Trump	Son of Donald Trump and Melania	American		University student	

== Heraldry ==
Coat of arms of Donald J. Trump
Adopted 1985 Armiger Donald Trump (1946–) Crest A Cubit Arm erected Argent, enfiling a Mascle and holding a Spear point upward, all Or. Escutcheon Argent ermined Or, two Chevronels couped between three demi-Lions, all Or.

The Trump family currently assumes usage of a differenced version of the Joseph E. Davies armorial achievement. Granted to Davies by the British College of Arms, in 1939. Davies was the third husband of Marjorie Merriweather Post and he was the former U.S. ambassador to United Kingdom. Davies produced no male heirs and his eldest daughter, Eleanor Tydings, became the heraldic heiress. Subsequently through the Anglosphere custom of male primogeniture, Tydings’ inherited arms passed to her eldest son, Senator Joseph Tydings, and then to his legitimate first-born male issue, as inheritors of the undifferenced arms, in perpetuity.

Donald Trump purchased the Florida estate Mar-a-Lago in 1985. The estate was built by Merriweather Post, who displayed her late husband’s arms prominently around the property. After his acquisition, Trump began an adopted usage of the Davies armorial achievement. These adopted arms are used at Trump golf courses and various other Trump Organization properties across the United States. Trump then began an assumed usage of a differenced version of Davies arms, which were then also registered by Trump with the U.S. patent and trademark office.

In 2008, Trump attempted to establish the American logo at his new Trump International Golf Links in Balmedie, Scotland, but was warned by the Lord Lyon King of Arms, the highest authority for Scottish heraldry, that an act of the Scottish Parliament from 1672 disallows people using unregistered arms. In January 2012, shortly after the inauguration of the golf course, Trump unveiled the new coat of arms that had been granted to "The Trump International Golf Club Scotland Ltd" by the Lord Lyon in 2011.

Coat of arms of the Trump International Golf Links
Granted 2011 Armiger Trump International Golf Links (2012–) Crest A demi-Lion rampant Gules, armed and langued Azure, holding in the paws a Pennon Or flowing to the sinister. Escutcheon Party per chevron: Azure two Mullets Argent; Vert a double headed Eagle of the second, wings displayed and inverted, armed and langued Gules, holding in its talons two Globes of the second; overall three chevronels Or. Motto "Numquam concedere" (Latin for "Never Give Up").

Sarah Malone, executive vice-president of "The Trump International Golf Links, Scotland", said that "the coat of arms brings together visual elements that signify different aspects of the Trump family heritage [...], the Lion Rampant [in the crest] makes reference to Scotland and the stars to America. Three chevronels are used to denote the sky, sand dunes and sea – the essential components of the site, and the double(-headed) eagle represents the dual nature and nationality of Trump's heritage, (Scottish and German). The Eagle clutches golf balls making reference to the great name of golf, and the motto Numquam Concedere is Latin for Never Give Up – Trump's philosophy."

From 2014, Trump used the same logo for the Trump International Golf Links, Ireland, the golf resort built from his acquisition of Doonbeg Golf Club.

== See also ==
- Family of Barack Obama, Trump's first-term predecessor as president (2009–2017)
- Family of Joe Biden, Trump's first-term successor and second-term predecessor as president (2021–2025)
- Family of Mike Pence, Trump's vice president under his first term
- Family of JD Vance, Trump's vice president under his second term
