= Elizabeth Christ Trump =

German and American businesswoman (1880–1966)

Elizabeth Trump
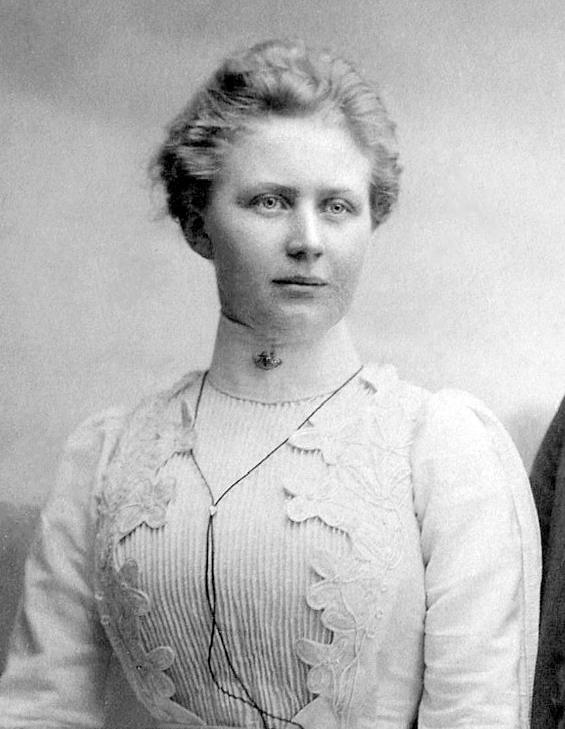
- Trump in 1902
- Born: Elisabeth Christ; October 10, 1880; Kallstadt, Kingdom of Bavaria, German Empire
- Died: June 6, 1966 (aged 85); Manhasset, New York, U.S.
- Burial place: All Faiths Cemetery, New York City
- Citizenship: Germany; United States
- Occupation: Businesswoman
- Spouse: Frederick Trump (m. 1902; died 1918)
- Children: 3, including Fred and John
- Family: Trump family

Elizabeth Christ Trump (née Christ; (Note: German pronunciation: [eˈliːzabɛt ˈkʁɪst]; English pronunciation: /krɪst/, rhyming with "fist".) October 10, 1880 – June 6, 1966) was a German and American businesswoman. In 1902, she married Frederick Trump, who died in 1918. After his death, she co-founded the real estate development company E. Trump & Son with their son, Fred, to manage and increase their real estate holdings. Through Fred, she was the paternal grandmother of Donald Trump, the 45th and 47th president of the United States.

== Early life ==
Elisabeth Christ was born in Kallstadt, Kingdom of Bavaria, German Empire, the daughter of Philipp Christ and Anna Maria (née Anthon). The family owned a small vineyard. However, the income provided by that was not adequate to meet their needs, and Philipp Christ worked as a tinker repairing and polishing old utensils and selling pots and pans. He ran his trade from his house on Freinsheimer Strasse in Kallstadt, which was just across the street from the home of Katharina Trump, an elderly widow who lived with her six children, including Frederick.

== Marriage and family ==
Katharina Trump's son, Frederick Trump, emigrated to North America in 1885 at the age of 16 and made his fortune with restaurants and brothels in the Klondike Gold Rush in northwest Canada. When he returned to Germany in 1901, he wooed Elisabeth over the objections of his mother, who felt that her prosperous son could and should find a bride from a wealthier and more refined family than that of Elisabeth.

Nonetheless, Frederick and Elisabeth married on 26 August 1902. He was 33 years of age at the time and she was 21. Friedrich and Elisabeth moved to New York and they set up house in an apartment in the predominantly German quarter of Morrisania in the Bronx. Elizabeth (as her name was spelled in the United States) kept house, while Frederick worked as barber and manager of a restaurant-hotel. Their first child, Elisabeth, was born on April 30, 1904.

Despite living in a German neighborhood, Elizabeth was homesick. The family returned to Kallstadt in 1904, selling their assets in America. As the Bavarian authorities suspected he had left Germany to avoid conscripted service in the Imperial Army, Frederick could not remain in Germany, so the family returned to the United States in 1905.

Their second child, Fred, was born, and they set up house on 177th Street in the Bronx. After Elizabeth gave birth to her third child, John, the family moved to Queens, where Frederick began to develop real estate. In 1918, he died of influenza during the 1918 flu pandemic, leaving an estate valued at $31,359 (or approximately equivalent to $432,885 in 2024).

Trump was considered the matriarch of the Trump family. She remained close to her son Fred for her entire life.

== E. Trump & Son ==
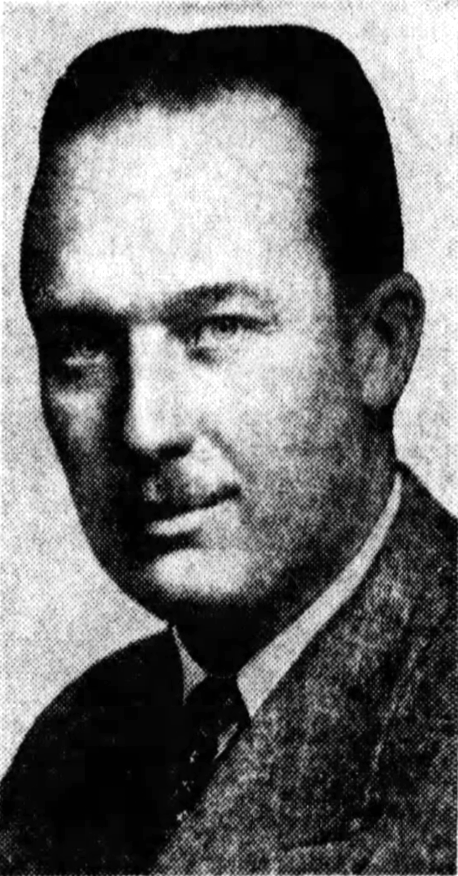
Elizabeth's son Fred Trump c. 1950

Following the death of her husband, Elizabeth Trump continued the real estate business he had begun. She had contractors build houses on the empty lots Frederick had owned, sold the houses, and earned income off the mortgages she provided to buyers. Her vision was to have her three children continue the family business. Initially, she operated under the ungendered name "E. Trump". In 1924, she switched to "E. Trump & Son" for advertising purposes, then "Sons", then back to the singular when it became clear that only her first son, Fred, would join. In later interviews, Fred tended to put himself center stage, saying that he had always dreamt of being a builder; that he completed his first house in 1924, just one year out of high school; and that his mother only got involved because she was old enough to "sign checks". But there are indications that Fred actually started more slowly and Elizabeth contributed more, including capital. When the business was formally incorporated, in 1927, Fred was old enough to sign checks, but "E. Trump & Son" remained the name. "It was no misnomer," wrote biographer Wayne Barrett, "she was intimately involved in the business."

Elizabeth Trump stayed involved in the family business throughout her life. In her 70s, she allegedly collected coins from the laundromats in Trump buildings. (Trump family biographer Gwenda Blair heard this from Elizabeth's grandchildren.) The collection of coins from the laundromat has also been associated with others in the family. Harry Hurt III states that Mary Trump, the wife of Elizabeth's son Fred, "drove back and forth between her husband's apartment projects in a Rolls-Royce, collecting coins from the washing machines in the laundry rooms", and during his 2016 presidential campaign, Elizabeth's grandson Donald Trump told a crowd in Staten Island that he had spent "probably five" boyhood summers there collecting coins from his father's laundry machines.
