= Böttger =

Böttger, Boettger, or Bottger is a German surname. Notable people with the surname include:

- Adolf Böttger (1815–1870), German translator and poet
- Caesar Rudolf Boettger (1888–1976), German malacologist
- Fritz Böttger (1902–1981), German actor and director
- Gavin Bottger (born 2007), American skateboarder
- Ike Boettger (born 1994), American football player
- Johann Friedrich Böttger (1682–1719), German alchemist
- Nancy Boettger (born 1943), Iowa Republican State Senator
- Matthias Böttger (born 1974), German architect and curator
- Oskar Boettger (1844–1910), German zoologist
- Rudolf Christian Böttger (1806–1881), German chemist
- Thomas Böttger (born 1957), German composer and pianist

== See also ==
- 5194 Böttger, an asteroid
