= Kallstadt =

- Municipality
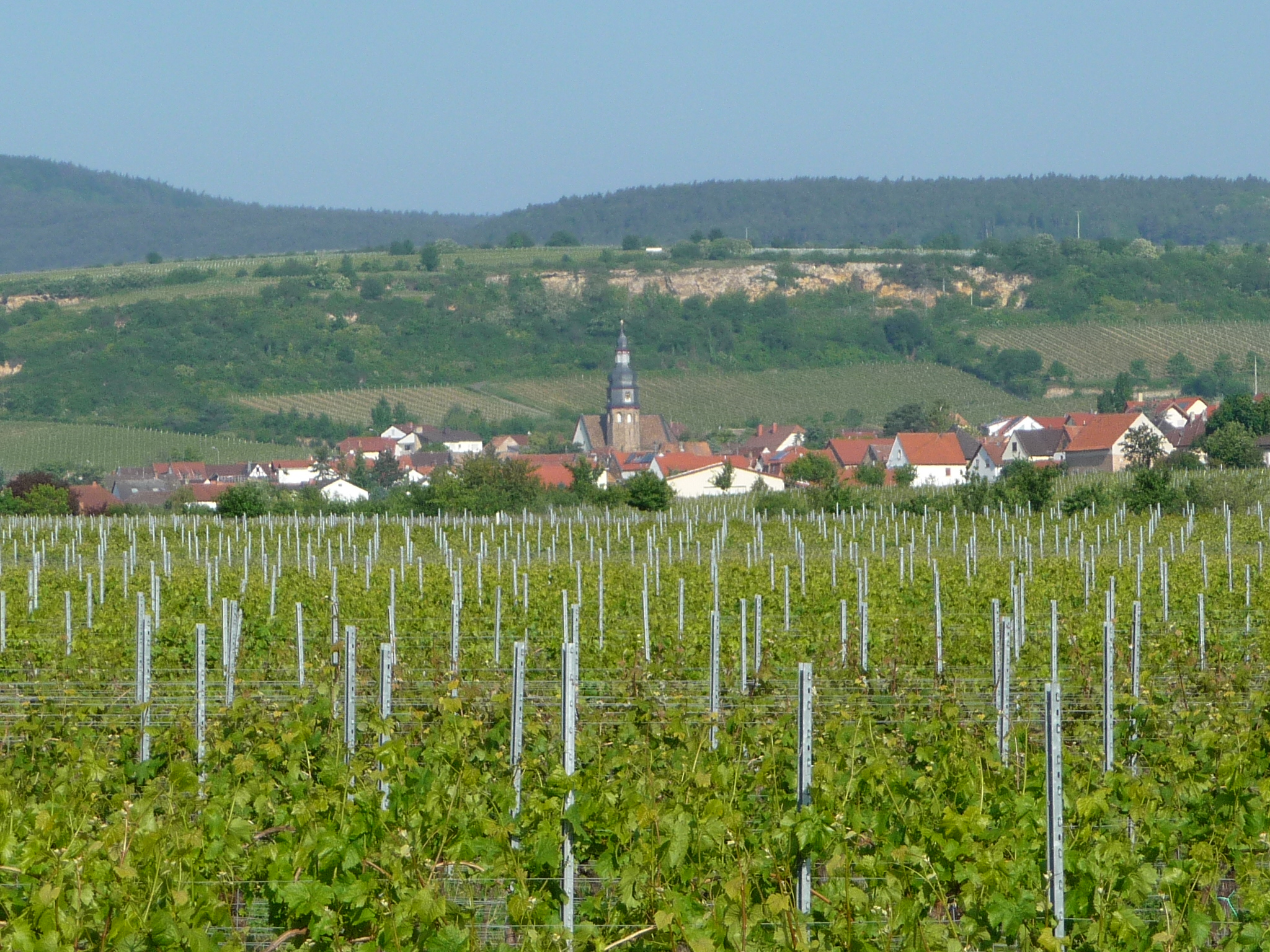

- Coat of arms

- Location of Kallstadt within Bad Dürkheim district
- Interactive map of Kallstadt
- Location within Germany Location within Rhineland-Palatinate
- Coordinates: 49°29′26″N 08°10′33″E
- Country: Germany
- State: Rhineland-Palatinate
- District: Bad Dürkheim
- Municipal assoc.: Freinsheim

Government
  - Mayor (2019–24): Dr. Thomas Jaworek (CDU)

Area
  - Total: 6.57 km^{2} (2.54 sq mi)
- Elevation: 134 m (440 ft)

Population (2025-12-31)
  - Total: 1,213
  - Density: 185/km^{2} (478/sq mi)
- Time zone: UTC+01:00 (CET)
  - Summer (DST): UTC+02:00 (CEST)
- Postal codes: 67169
- Dialling codes: 06322
- Vehicle registration: DÜW
- Website: www.kallstadt.de

Kallstadt (German pronunciation: [ˈkalʃtat]) is a village in the Palatine part of Rhineland-Palatinate, one of Germany's 16 federal states. It is part of the Rhine-Neckar Metropolitan Region whose largest city is Mannheim, Germany's 22nd largest city. During much of the 19th century, it was part of the Kingdom of Bavaria. It has gained international media attention as the ancestral home of the related Heinz and Trump families, two prominent business and political families in the United States.

== Geography ==
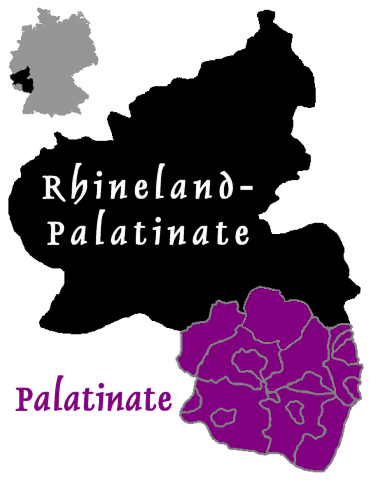

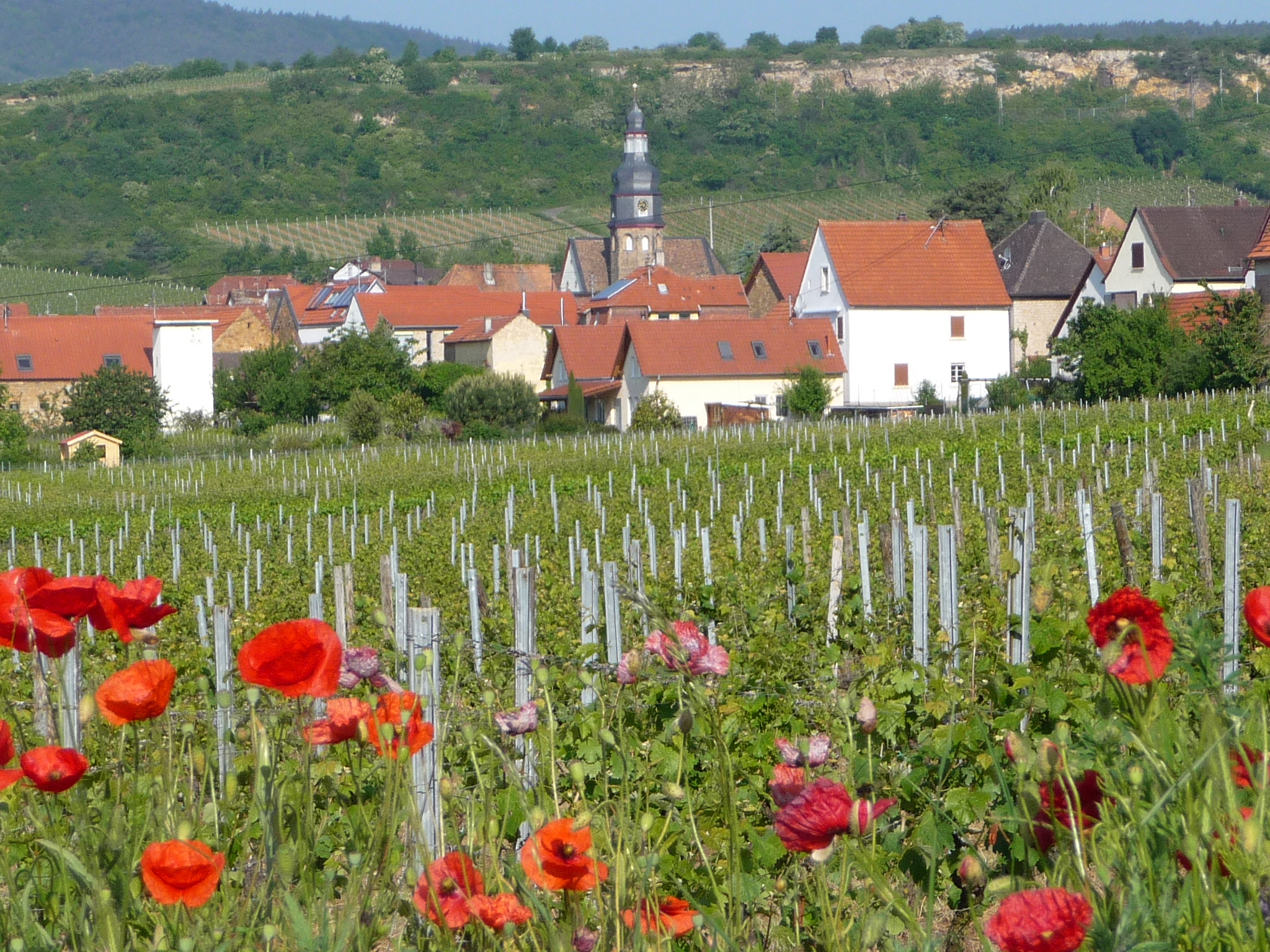
Winegrowing in Kallstadt, 2014

Kallstadt is located on the German Wine Route.

It is part of the Verbandsgemeinde of Freinsheim, whose seat is in the eponymous town.

The village of 1,200 inhabitants is in a region whose economy is booming. It has restaurants that can accommodate about 2,000 guests and hotels with about 400 beds. Tourists include Americans from Ramstein Air Base.

== History ==
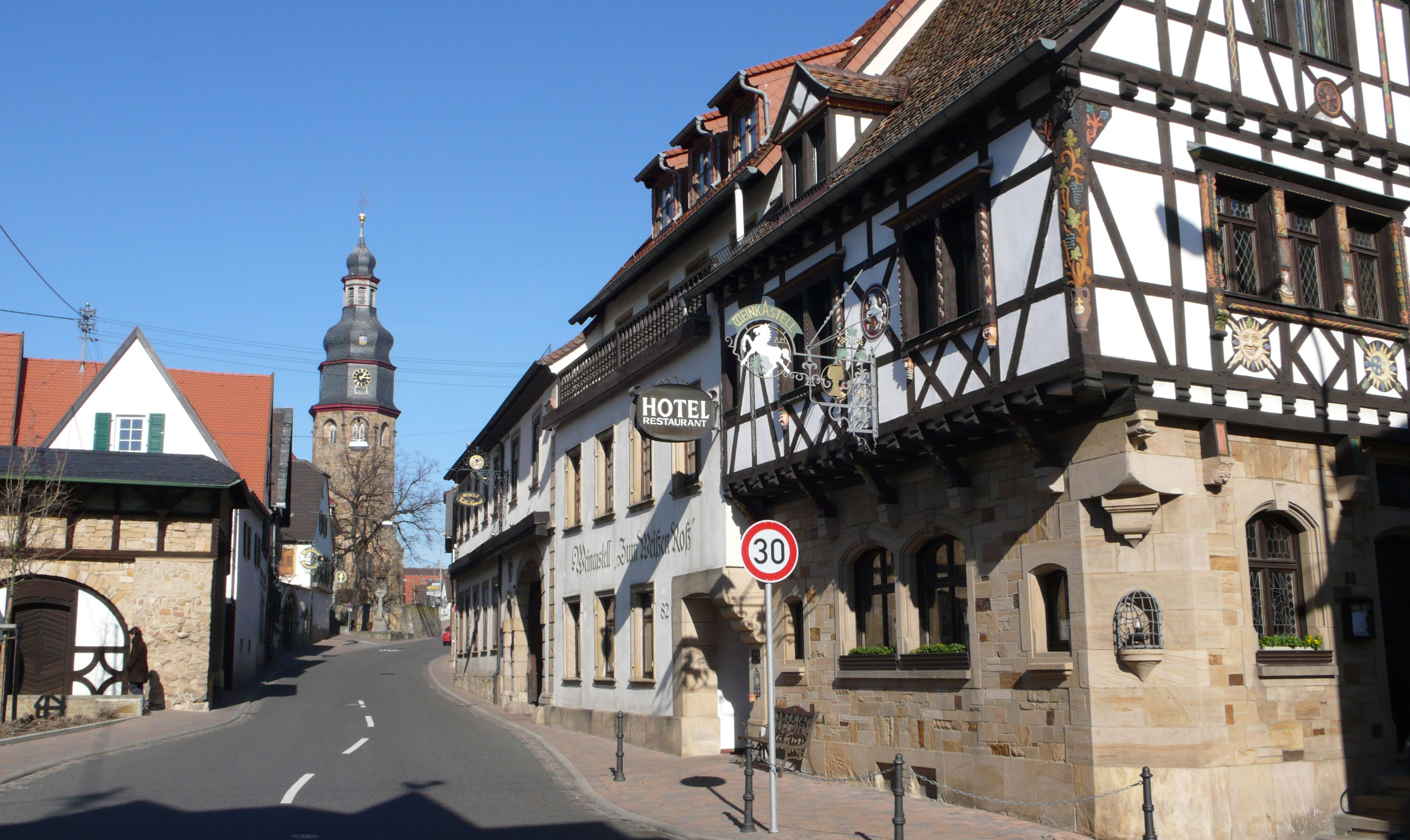
The main street

A Roman road linked Altenstadt – now in French Alsace and a constituent community of Wissembourg – with the Rhineland; an early settlement here was prosperous in Roman times. Many archaeological finds are evidence of settlement by merchants, former legionnaires and also winegrowers from about 79 BC to at least 383 AD. A Frankish clan arose about 500 and its chief, Chagilo, became the village's namesake.

In 824, Kallstadt was first mentioned in records as Cagelenstat. Originally an Imperial Village, it later passed to the County of Pfeffingen (Homburg). From 1321 it was held in fief first by the Monfort knights, and then from 1451 until about 1551 by the House of Blicken von Lichtenberg. From then until 1794, Kallstadt belonged as an Electoral Palatinate fief to the holdings of the House of Leiningen.

The Left Bank of the Rhine was occupied by France during the War of the First Coalition in 1794. Following the Treaty of Campo Formio (1797), the French First Republic annexed the region and, between 1798 and 1814, Kallstadt belonged to the French department of Mont-Tonnerre.

Neither the Holy Roman Empire nor the Electoral Palatinate was restored at the Congress of Vienna in 1815. Germany became a loose confederation of states dominated by Austria and Prussia, which both annexed most of the German territories left of the Rhine. Kallstadt came under Austrian rule, but Austria quickly exchanged the area with the Kingdom of Bavaria in 1816. After this agreement, Kallstadt belonged to Bavaria, which joined the German Empire in 1871.

The (Western) Palatinate, including Kallstadt, remained Bavarian until after the end of World War II, when the German states were formally reorganized after becoming virtually defunct under the Nazi regime, when Kallstadt belonged to the Gau Westmark. The Palatinate was separated from Bavaria in 1946 and became a part of the new State of Rhineland-Palatinate, a founding state of the Federal Republic of Germany. A referendum to restore the union of the Palatinate and Bavaria failed in 1956, and Kallstadt continues to belong to Rhineland-Palatinate.

=== Buildings and structures ===
- Bismarck Tower – The Bismarck tower stands on the 497 m-high Peterskopf in an exclave belonging to Kallstadt in the Palatinate Forest.
- St. Salvator, a Lutheran congregation belonging to the Evangelical Church of the Palatinate. The Church is the oldest buildíng in the municipality; parts date to the 15th century. The parish belonged to the University of Heidelberg until 1563 and went back to the formal possession of the Electoral Palatinate. Reformation in the Palatinate, including Kallstadt, was introduced in 1556.
- There are various winehouses, which combine wine stores and gastronomy. Carl Benz was the first one to use a motor car to drive to the inns of Kallstadt from his hometown of Ladenburg. Famous guests in the Weinhaus Henninger comprise e.g. Zhou Enlai, Aristoteles Onassis, Remy Heidsiek, Mohammad Reza Pahlavi and Empress Soraya, Will Quadflieg and Erika Köth.

=== Heinz and Trump families ===
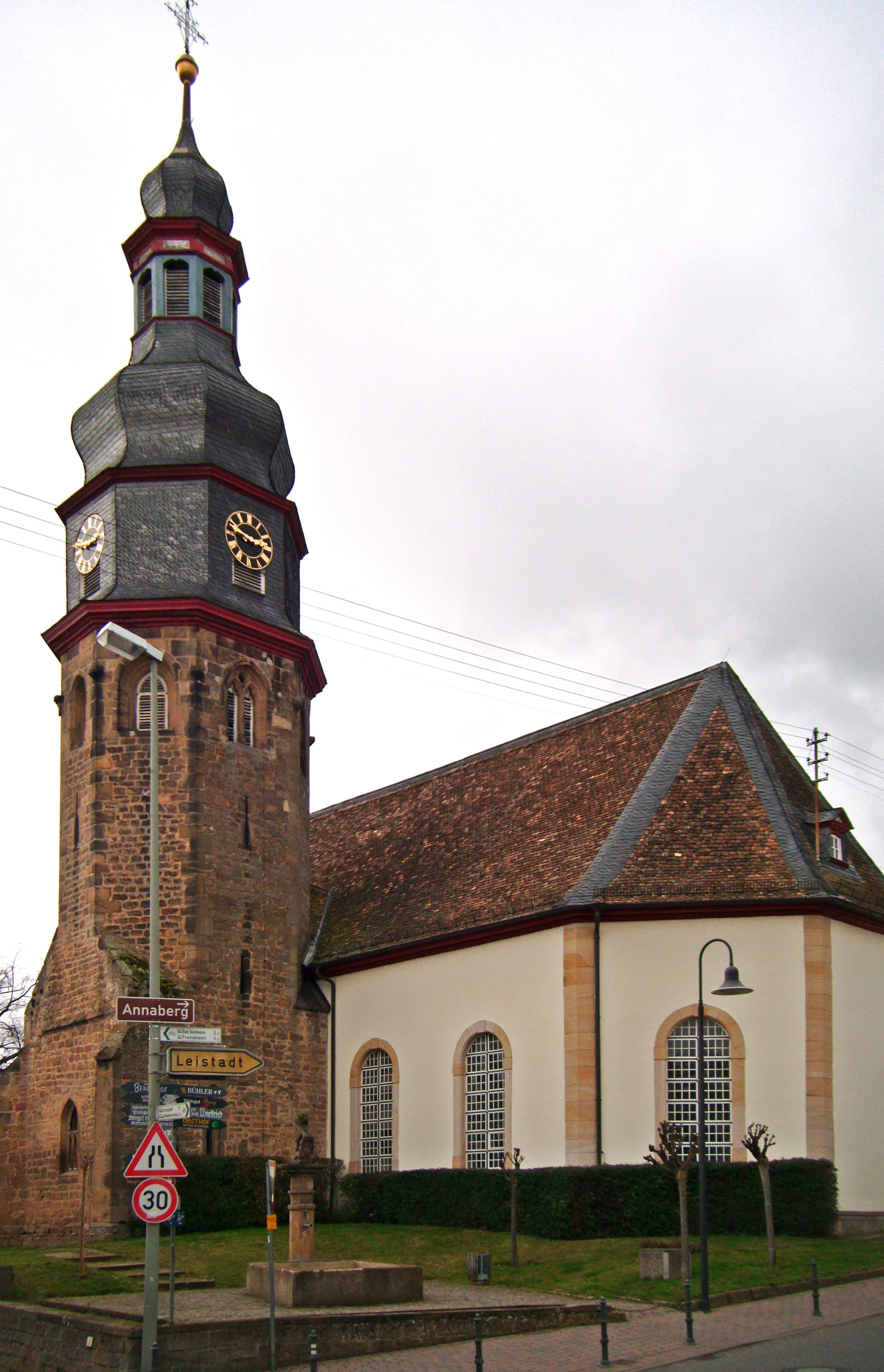
The Salvatorkirche (Savior's church) of Kallstadt

Kallstadt is the ancestral home of immigrant ancestors of both the Heinz and Trump families in the United States. The two families are related. The Trump family has resided in Kallstadt since the 17th century.

In 2015, filmmaker Simone Wendel, who is from Kallstadt (and remotely related to the Trump family), produced a documentary called Kings of Kallstadt. The film explores the relationship between the local inhabitants and their prominent relatives in the USA. Wendel showed the strong and longstanding winemaking and gastronomic tradition in Kallstadt. She suggests that the locals have more appreciation for the Heinz family, as their main product has been practical condiment, and is less abstract than Trump's real-estate business. The locals positively remember the Heinz trust receiving a Kallstadt delegation. The Heinz family recently provided a major donation (€40,000) for the renovation of the organ in the local church, St. Salvator, while Donald Trump did not contribute to this project. Wendel interviewed Donald Trump in New York and showed a Kallstadt delegation at the Steuben Day parade. Trump prolonged the interview over the preset time and promised to visit Kallstadt.

== Politics ==
=== Municipal council ===
The council is made up of 16 council members, who were elected at the municipal election held on 25 May 2014, and the mayor as chairman.

The municipal election held on 25 May 2014 yielded the following results:

	SPD	CDU	FWG	Total
2014	4	7	5	16 seats
2009	4	6	6	16 seats
2004	4	5	7	16 seats

=== Coat of arms ===
The German blazon reads: Über goldener Zinnenmauer, darin ein roter Reichsapfel mit goldenem Reif und rotem Kreuz, beseitet von je einer blauen Schießscharte, in Blau ein rotbewehrter silberner Adler.

The municipality's arms might in English heraldic language be described thus: Per fess embattled, azure an eagle displayed argent armed and langued gules, and Or masoned an orb of the third banded of the field and ensigned with a cross fleuretty of the third, this last between two arrowslits of the first.

Kallstadt's oldest known seal dates from 1494 and bears as charges both the Palatine Lion and the Wittelsbach bendy lozengy pattern (slanted diamond shapes alternating in tincture between argent and azure, that is, silver and blue) accompanied by a small letter K in base. In 1506, something similar to the current arms appeared when another seal showed an eagle above a wall. This reflected the village's incorporation into the Leiningen holdings. A similar composition prevailed until 1711 when a seal charged simply with a globus cruciger appeared. This stood for the Counts Palatine, possibly putting its origin before 1506. On 15 January 1845, a coat of arms that might be described as "Azure an orb ensigned with a cross Or", that is, a blue escutcheon bearing a golden globus cruciger with a cross on top, was granted as the municipality's arms. On 22 June 1962, however, the current arms combining the charges of these last arms and the 1506 seal were granted.

== Notable people ==
- Wilhelm Heinrich von Creuzer (1740–1794), German jurist and court president
- Johann Heinrich Heinz, father of American food industry entrepreneur Henry J. Heinz, founder of the H. J. Heinz Company
- Frederick Trump (born Friedrich Trumpf), German-American businessman, paternal grandfather of 45th and 47th US president Donald Trump
- Elizabeth Trump, (born Elisabeth Christ), German-American businesswoman, spouse of Frederick Trump and paternal grandmother of US president Donald Trump
- Norbert Scharf, politician (SPD)

== See also ==
- Karlstad, Sweden
