= Who Could Ever Love You =

2024 book by Mary L. Trump

Who Could Ever Love You: A Family Memoir
- Author: Mary L. Trump
- Language: English
- Subject: Donald Trump
- Published: September 10, 2024
- Publisher: St. Martin's Press (US)
- Publication place: United States
- Pages: 288
- ISBN: 9781250278470 (hardcover)

Who Could Ever Love You: A Family Memoir is the third book written by Mary L. Trump about her uncle Donald Trump and the Trump family as a whole. The book mainly concerns Mary Trump's family life, threats from her aunts and uncles, and her role in providing The New York Times with information on the tax affairs of the Trump family. It follows her books Too Much and Never Enough and The Reckoning, and has been described as a follow-up to the 2024 book All in the Family by her brother, Fred Trump III.

In Kirkus Reviews, it was described as "[a] scathing exposé of the enduring fallout from a poisonous, dysfunctional family dynamic". The book was recommended in an editorial in the New York Amsterdam News, though it was noted that it "merely confirms what far too many Americans have experienced".
