= Robert Trump =

American businessman (1948–2020)

- Born: Robert Stewart Trump; August 26, 1948; New York City, U.S.
- Died: August 15, 2020 (aged 71); New York City, U.S.
- Burial place: All Faiths Cemetery, New York
- Education: Boston University (BS)
- Occupations: Businessman; real estate developer; investor
- Board member of: ZeniMax Media
- Spouses: Blaine Beard (m. 1984; div. 2010) Ann Marie Pallan (m. 2020)
- Parent(s): Fred Trump; Mary Anne MacLeod
- Family: Trump family

Robert Stewart Trump (August 26, 1948 – August 15, 2020) was an American businessman and investor. He was the younger brother of Donald Trump and a loyal supporter of his political career. Donald was elected the 45th and 47th president of the United States.

Trump served on the board of directors for ZeniMax Media, parent company to Bethesda Softworks, from 1999 until his death in 2020. In addition to being a board member at ZeniMax, he was also an investor in the company.

In the years before his death, Robert Trump was the president of the Trump Organization, a business owned by the Trump siblings. He also worked as a real estate developer.

== Early life and education ==
Robert Stewart Trump was born in Queens on August 26, 1948, to Fred Trump and Mary Anne MacLeod. He was the youngest of their five children; his siblings were Maryanne, Fred Jr., Elizabeth, and Donald. He graduated from St Paul's School in Garden City, Long Island. Trump attended Boston University, where he majored in economics; while there, he played soccer and was the MVP and team captain in 1969.

== Career ==
Trump joined his father's business and came to manage the Trump Organization's real estate holdings outside of Manhattan.

After Mark G. Etess died in an October 1989 helicopter crash, Donald Trump appointed Robert Trump to serve in Etess's former position. Etess had been the top executive at the Trump Taj Mahal, Robert Trump's special sporting events coordinator, and the master of super deals in sports and entertainment for Donald Trump. (Note: After Donald Trump traveled to Russia and visited Moscow and St. Petersburg in 1987, he began organizing sporting events through representatives with Viktor Galaev (Russian: Виктор Галаев) and the KGB controller Sergey Chemezov's Sovintersport which held a monopoly on Soviet sports. As KGB officers, both Vladimir Putin and Chemezov, who were friends, lived in the same apartment building in Dresden when they formed Sovintersport in the 1980s. Sergei Chemezov, who became a hunter during his days in Dresden, loves hunting in Czechoslovakia, the Czech Republic and Slovakia where Chemezov hunted with fellowing hunting enthusiast Sergey Yastrzhembsky who was the Russian Ambassador to Slovakia from 3 June 1993 to 13 August 1996.)

When concern was expressed about violent video games in the wake of the 1999 Columbine High School massacre, "political luminaries", including Robert Trump, were added to the board of directors for ZeniMax Media, Bethesda Softworks' parent company. During his tenure as a director, ZeniMax published several series, including Fallout, The Elder Scrolls, Doom, and Wolfenstein. Media outlets highlighted his role at the company in the wake of the Parkland school shooting, when his brother linked video games to violence and subsequently met with various industry chiefs, including Robert Altman, CEO of ZeniMax. In addition to being a board member at ZeniMax, Trump was also an investor in the company.

Robert Trump was the president of Trump Management, Inc., Fred Trump's business, later owned by the Trump siblings, including Donald, Robert, Maryanne Trump-Barry, and Elizabeth Trump-Grau. At some point, Trump worked as a real estate developer.

=== Mary Trump book lawsuit ===
In June 2020, Robert Trump filed a lawsuit seeking to preclude the upcoming publication of his niece Mary L. Trump's book Too Much and Never Enough. Trump's lawsuit was based on a 2001 confidentiality agreement she signed in settling a lawsuit related to her grandfather Fred Trump's will and estate.

In July 2020, Justice Hal B. Greenwald of the New York Supreme Court ruled that the book's publisher, Simon & Schuster, was not a party to the 2001 NDA, and its rights to publish the book were not restricted by that agreement. Greenwald affirmed that Mary Trump's contract with the publisher gave her no ability to halt publication at that point. The book was published on July 14, 2020.

== Personal life ==
Robert Trump lived in Millbrook, New York. In 1984, he married Blaine Beard, whom he met at a Christie's fundraiser. He had a stepson named Christopher Trump-Retchin. In 2004, Blaine overdosed on pills and was hospitalized at Mount Sinai Hospital in Manhattan after she learned that Robert had bought a $3.7 million house on Long Island for his secretary and then-girlfriend Ann Marie Pallan. They were involved in a divorce battle that lasted from 2007 until they reached a secret settlement in 2010.

In 2006, after Robert and Blaine separated, they put their 6,500-square-foot (600-square-meter), three-unit, three-floor, unfinished co-op residence on the market. In 2012, Blaine Trump put her $17.5 million mansion in Millbrook up for sale.

Trump married his second wife, Ann Marie Pallan, in January 2020.

Trump was a longtime friend of Robert A. Altman.

=== Relationship with his brother Donald ===
In 1990, Donald Trump put Robert in charge of the Trump Taj Mahal casino in Atlantic City, New Jersey. The casino experienced significant problems with its grand opening, especially the slot machine financial controls, that took months to rectify. According to Jack O'Donnell, a former Trump Organization executive, at one of the meetings, "Donald Trump screamed at his brother, putting the blame for the slot machine debacle entirely on him."

Robert Trump remained a loyal supporter of his brother's political career. After Robert died, Fox commentator Eric Bolling said that Robert and his wife Ann Marie Pallan were strong supporters of Donald. Donald said on Fox & Friends that Robert was his biggest fan and that he also heard about Robert's support from others.

== Illness and death ==
On August 14, 2020, ABC News reported that Trump had been hospitalized at Mount Sinai Hospital in Manhattan after having previously been in the hospital's intensive care unit for over a week in June. Donald Trump visited him that day and said afterward that Robert was seriously ill and "having a hard time". Robert Trump died at New York–Presbyterian Hospital in Manhattan the next day, August 15, at age 71. The New York Times quoted a family friend as saying that Trump had recently started experiencing intracerebral hemorrhaging after a fall. His niece Mary, in an interview with Greenpeace a few days before his death, said that Robert had been sick and hospitalized "a couple of times in the last three months".

In a statement, Donald Trump wrote, "He was not just my brother, he was my best friend." On August 21, a funeral service was held for Robert in the East Room. 150 guests attended. This was the first time in almost a century that a president had held a funeral in the East Room.
