= Judge Vazquez =

Judge Vazquez may refer to:

- John Michael Vazquez (born 1970), judge of the United States District Court for the District of New Jersey
- Martha Vázquez (born 1953), judge of the United States District Court for the District of New Mexico
