= The Reckoning (Trump book) =

2021 non-fiction book by Mary L. Trump

The Reckoning: Our Nation's Trauma and Finding a Way to Heal
- First edition (US)
- Author: Mary L. Trump
- Language: English
- Subject: Donald Trump
- Published: August 17, 2021
- Publisher: St. Martin's Press (US); Atlantic Books (UK)
- Publication place: United States
- Pages: 240
- ISBN: 978-1-250278-45-6 (hardcover)

The Reckoning: Our Nation's Trauma and Finding a Way to Heal is the second book written by Mary L. Trump about her uncle Donald Trump. Preceded in Mary Trump's bibliography by 2020's Too Much and Never Enough, it was published on August 17, 2021, by St. Martin's Press.

== Synopsis ==
The Reckoning posits that the United States has suffered trauma from its inception because of its inclusion of systemic racism and its failure to address the existence of white supremacy (Note: In particular, Trump cites continued anti-black racism following the abolition of slavery, including the failures of Reconstruction and the implementation of Jim Crow laws, with Democrats largely responsible.) (exemplified by the election of the author's uncle Donald Trump as president of the United States in 2016 and attempts to overturn the 2020 election). Mary Trump discusses the COVID-19 pandemic as a more recent source of trauma and criticizes Donald's response and rhetoric as worsening the crisis. She also argues that her uncle is only pretending to run again in 2024 to raise money, having previously argued that he would be too afraid to lose again. (Note: Donald Trump won the Republican Party's presidential nomination for a third consecutive election and then went on to become the first former president since Grover Cleveland in 1892 to win a non-consecutive second term.)

== Themes ==
Mary Trump argues that much current discord in the United States is the result of its "original sin of slavery" and the persistence of racism and white supremacy, a divide that her uncle Donald has aggravated and exploited. As a result, Americans are collectively suffering from a form of PTSD.

The Guardian called the book "A revealing blend of family lore, history, policy and anger casts light on the background and legacy of Donald Trump."

== Reception ==
Reviews of the book have been mixed. Lloyd Green of The Guardian says "It is a less lurid read [than Too Much and Never Enough] but a darker one too. According to Mary Trump, 'we are heading toward an even darker period in our nation's history. Each of us will see what we will see. Our cold civil war continues.' With her second book, Mary Trump offers food for thought – and grist for the mill." However, Green also says, "Mary Trump puts her positions passionately but perhaps she could pause to consider how such agendas play with voters."

Kirkus Reviews calls it "of value to those pondering what happened for the past five years and whether we can truly heal. She's at her best, and on the firmest of ground, when she lays into her uncle's manifest shortcomings. She says, 'When your motive is not simply winning at all costs but grievance and revenge, you're more dangerous than a straight-up sociopath. Donald is much worse than that—he's someone with a gaping wound where his soul should be.'"

In The Washington Post, political commentator Joe Klein writes: "A great rant can be cathartic, but it needs discipline. Trump is sloppy. There are no footnotes. Too many sentences contain half-truths and gross generalizations, unsupported by facts."
