= Henry Curtis Meanor =

American judge (1929–2008)

Judge of the United States District Court for the District of New Jersey
- In office June 25, 1974 – February 7, 1983
- Appointed by: Richard Nixon
- Preceded by: John Joseph Kitchen
- Succeeded by: Maryanne Trump Barry

Personal details
- Born: Henry Curtis Meanor; October 6, 1929 Cleveland, Ohio
- Died: August 22, 2008 (aged 78) Bloomsburg, Pennsylvania
- Education: Rutgers University (B.A.); Rutgers Law School (LL.B.)

Henry Curtis Meanor (October 6, 1929 – August 22, 2008) was a United States district judge of the United States District Court for the District of New Jersey.

== Education and career ==
Born in Cleveland, Ohio, Meanor received a Bachelor of Arts degree from Rutgers University in 1952, and a Bachelor of Laws from Rutgers Law School in 1955. After his graduation, he served as a law clerk to Judge Phillip Forman of the United States District Court for the District of New Jersey from 1955 to 1956. Meanor was in private practice from 1956 to 1959, and again from 1960 to 1969, having worked as acting secretary to New Jersey Governor Robert B. Meyner in 1959 and 1960. Meanor also taught as an adjunct professor of law at Fordham University from 1964 to 1968. From 1969 to 1972, he was a Judge for the county court of Essex County, New Jersey, and then became a Judge for the Appellate Division of the New Jersey Superior Court until 1974.

== Federal judicial service ==
On May 8, 1974, President Richard Nixon nominated Meanor to a seat on the United States District Court for the District of New Jersey vacated by Judge John Joseph Kitchen. Meanor was confirmed by the United States Senate on June 13, 1974, and received his commission on June 25, 1974. He served until his resignation on February 7, 1983. He died on August 22, 2008, in Bloomsburg, Pennsylvania.

== Sources ==
Legal offices
Preceded by John Joseph Kitchen	Judge of the United States District Court for the District of New Jersey; 1974–1983	Succeeded by Maryanne Trump Barry
