= Nako Nakatsuka =

Japanese researcher

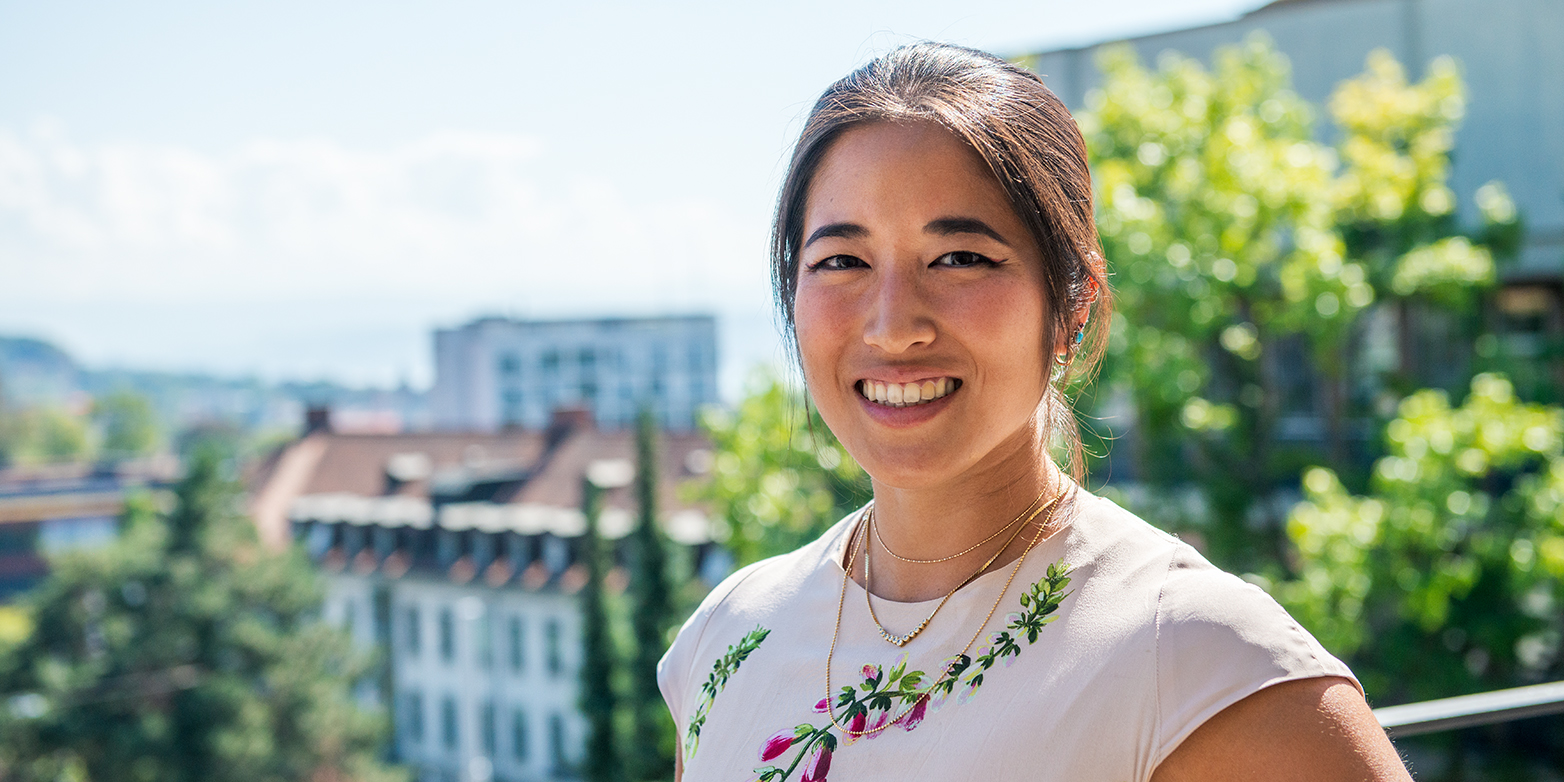
- Born: Osaka
- Education: University of California, Los Angeles; Fordham University; International School of the Sacred Heart
- Scientific career
- Workplaces: ETH Zürich; Moderna
- Thesis: Aptamer-Functionalized Field-Effect Transistors For Serotonin and Dopamine Sensing (2017)

Nako Nakatsuka is a Japanese researcher and Assistant Professor of Neurotechnology at EPFL. Her research is focused on pioneering translational technologies that directly impact human health. Her research group, the Laboratory of Chemical Nanotechnology (CHEMINA) works at the intersection of chemistry, engineering, and neuroscience to develop innovative strategies to support patients suffering from neurodegenerative diseases. She was awarded the 2023 Prix Zonta.

== Early life and education ==
Nakatsuka was born in Osaka. She enrolled at the International School of the Sacred Heart, which was an all-girls' English-speaking school. She was an undergraduate student at Fordham University, where she majored in chemistry and bioengineering. She has said that at Fordham University she was inspired by Ipsita Banerjee. At Fordham she was a competitive athlete who ran cross country. She was a doctoral researcher at University of California, Los Angeles, where she worked alongside Paul Weiss and Anne M. Andrews. Her doctoral research considered aptamer-functionalised field effect transistors for serotonin and dopamine sensing. She used chemical lift-off lithography and microfluidics to pattern small molecules in specific locations, which allowed for quantification of specific binding. She developed on-chip sensors for calculation of equilibrium dissociation constants. While in UCLA she contributed to the children's book A is for Atom: ABCs for Aspiring Chemists, which introduces pre-kindergarten children to chemistry and the alphabet.

== Research and career ==
Nakatsuka develops sensors that could be used to detect chemical changes in the brain that could be indicative of neurodegenerative disease and depression. Her sensors could be used to differentiate between similar molecules, e.g. neurotransmitters, precursors and metabolites. Nakatsuka used a DNA-based aptamer, which has a specific affinity for serotonin. Serotonin is critical in sleep and appetite, and is impacted by depression and obsessive–compulsive disorder. In the presence of serotonin the shape of the aptamer changes, which alters the electrical current. She aims to implant the sensor close to individual neurons to map serotonin activity in the brain.

Nakatsuka moved to ETH Zurich in 2018, first as a postdoctoral fellow and eventually joining the faculty. She was awarded the 2023 ETH Zurich Prix Zonta, which supports women scientists and professors. In 2024 she was awarded the Fondation Philanthropique Famille Sandoz prize to develop neurochemical biosensors for monitoring neurological disease.

== Awards and honours ==
- 2021 Innovators Under 35
- 2023 ETH Zurich Prix Zonta
- 2024 Fondation Philanthropique Famille Sandoz Prize

== Select publications ==
- Nako Nakatsuka; Kyung-Ae Yang; John M. Abendroth; et al. (6 September 2018). "Aptamer-field-effect transistors overcome Debye length limitations for small-molecule sensing". Science. 362 (6412): 319–324. doi:10.1126/science.aao6750. ISSN 0036-8075. PMC 6663484. PMID 30190311. Wikidata Q91321385.
- Jaemyung Kim; You Seung Rim; Huajun Chen; et al. (1 April 2015). "Fabrication of High-Performance Ultrathin In2O3 Film Field-Effect Transistors and Biosensors Using Chemical Lift-Off Lithography". ACS Nano. 9 (4): 4572–4582. doi:10.1021/acsnano.5b01211. ISSN 1936-0851. PMID 25798751. Wikidata Q43459678.
- Mohammad Mahdi Hasani-Sadrabadi; Patricia Sarrion; Nako Nakatsuka; et al. (21 March 2019). "Hierarchically Patterned Polydopamine-Containing Membranes for Periodontal Tissue Engineering". ACS Nano. 13 (4): 3830–3838. doi:10.1021/acsnano.8b09623. ISSN 1936-0851. PMID 30895772. Wikidata Q92518757.
