= Jamel K. Semper =

American judge (born 1981)

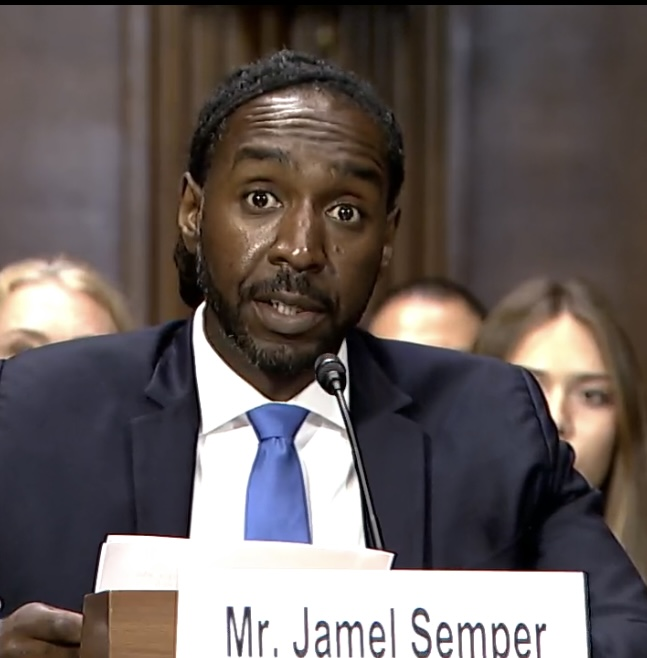

Judge of the United States District Court for the District of New Jersey
- Incumbent
- Assumed office December 1, 2023
- Appointed by: Joe Biden
- Preceded by: John Michael Vazquez

Personal details
- Born: Jamel Ken Semper; 1981 (age 44–45) Brooklyn, New York, U.S.
- Education: Hampton University (BA); Rutgers University (JD)

Jamel Ken Semper (born 1981) is an American lawyer from New Jersey who has served as a United States district judge of the United States District Court for the District of New Jersey since 2023. He previously served as an assistant United States attorney in the U.S. Attorney's Office for the District of New Jersey from 2018 to 2023.

== Education ==
Semper received a Bachelor of Arts from Hampton University in 2003 and a Juris Doctor from Rutgers Law School in 2007.

== Career ==
Semper served as a law clerk for Judge Harold Fullilove of the Essex County Superior Court from 2007 to 2008. From 2008 to 2013 he served as an assistant prosecutor in the Union County Prosecutor's Office and from 2013 to 2018 he served as an assistant prosecutor in the Essex County Prosecutor's Office. From 2018 to 2023, he served as an assistant United States attorney in the U.S. Attorney's Office for the District of New Jersey, where he served as deputy chief of the Office's Criminal Division. During his time as an Assistant U.S. Attorney, Semper headed the Organized Crimes and Gangs section. In 2021, Semper was one of seven candidates under consideration to be the United States attorney for the District of New Jersey.

=== Notable cases ===
Semper was the lead prosecutor in the case of Ali Muhammad Brown. Brown, a convert to Islam and jihadi, in 2018 was convicted of multiple murders that occurred in 2014 in Seattle, Washington, and West Orange, New Jersey. Semper's prosecution in this case was New Jersey's first under the state's domestic terrorism statute.

=== Federal judicial service ===
On September 6, 2023, President Joe Biden announced his intent to nominate Semper to serve as a United States district judge of the United States District Court for the District of New Jersey. On September 18, 2023, his nomination was sent to the Senate. President Biden nominated Semper to the seat vacated by Judge John Michael Vazquez, who resigned on September 8, 2023. On October 4, 2023, a hearing on his nomination was held before the Senate Judiciary Committee. On October 26, 2023, his nomination was reported out of committee by a 13–8 vote. On November 29, 2023, the United States Senate invoked cloture on his nomination by a 54–44 vote. Later that day, his nomination was confirmed by a 54–44 vote. He received his judicial commission on December 1, 2023.

== See also ==
- List of African American federal judges
- List of African American jurists

Legal offices
Preceded by John Michael Vazquez	Judge of the United States District Court for the District of New Jersey; 2023–present	Incumbent
