= Bennett College (New York) =

Women's secondary school and college in New York, USA (1890–1977)

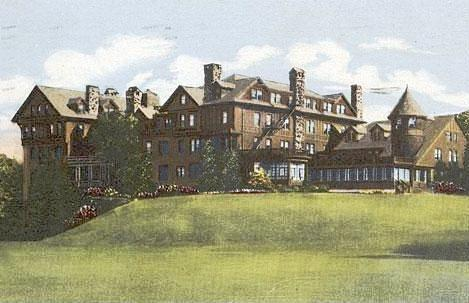
- Bennett Junior College, Halcyon Hall (around 1910)

Location
- Millbrook, Dutchess County, New York, U.S. 41°46′35″N 73°41′58″W

Information
- Former names: Bennett School for Girls, Bennett Junior College
- School type: Private women's
- Opened: 1890
- Closed: 1977

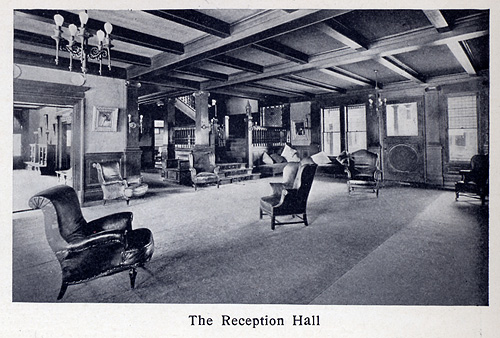
Reception hall (1907)

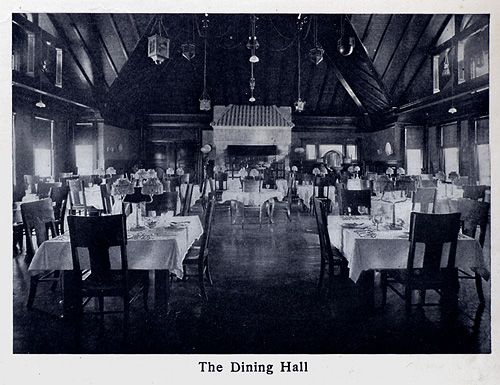
Dining hall (1907)

Bennett College was a women's college founded in 1890 and located in the village of Millbrook, New York. The school closed in 1977.

== History ==
Bennett College was founded in 1890 at Irvington, New York by May F. Bennett as the Bennett School for Girls, a four-year high school with two extra years of study. In 1907 the college moved to its final home on 22 acres (89,000 m^{2}) in Millbrook, Dutchess County, New York. In 1907 the school had an enrollment of 120 students and a faculty of 29.

In the early 20th century the school discontinued its high school grades and became a junior college only, changing its name to Bennett College. The two-year curriculum continued through the 1970s. Generations of young women from prominent American families attended Bennett over its 90-year history.

Majors of study included art, fashion design, interior design, music, modern languages, literature, history, dance, drama, child development, equine studies, and domestic science. Activities at Bennett included gymnastics, golf, tennis, horseback riding and skiing. The school was home to a full-time teaching Nursery School for 3 and 4 year olds as well as a riding stable.

At the time of its closing, enrollment was around 300 students.

== Closure ==
With the growing popularity of coeducation in the 1970s, Bennett found itself struggling to survive. An attempt to upgrade facilities and convert to a coed college in the mid-1970s left the already troubled college in financial distress. In 1977 the trustees attempted to reach a collaboration agreement with Briarcliff College, a junior women's college in Briarcliff Manor, Westchester County, which was also struggling with low enrollment. The plan did not work, however, and Briarcliff instead merged with New York Institute of Technology in 1977 after both Briarcliff and Bennett entered bankruptcy. On August 9, 1977, the college closed its doors for good. Its contents were auctioned in December 1977.

The library and records of Bennett College were transferred to Millbrook Library along with other school artifacts.

Bennett College closed a few weeks after its freshman orientation in the fall. The students who had already arrived at Bennett for their fall semester were given the opportunity to attend Marist College, a nearby co-educational college in Poughkeepsie, New York.

== Halcyon Hall ==
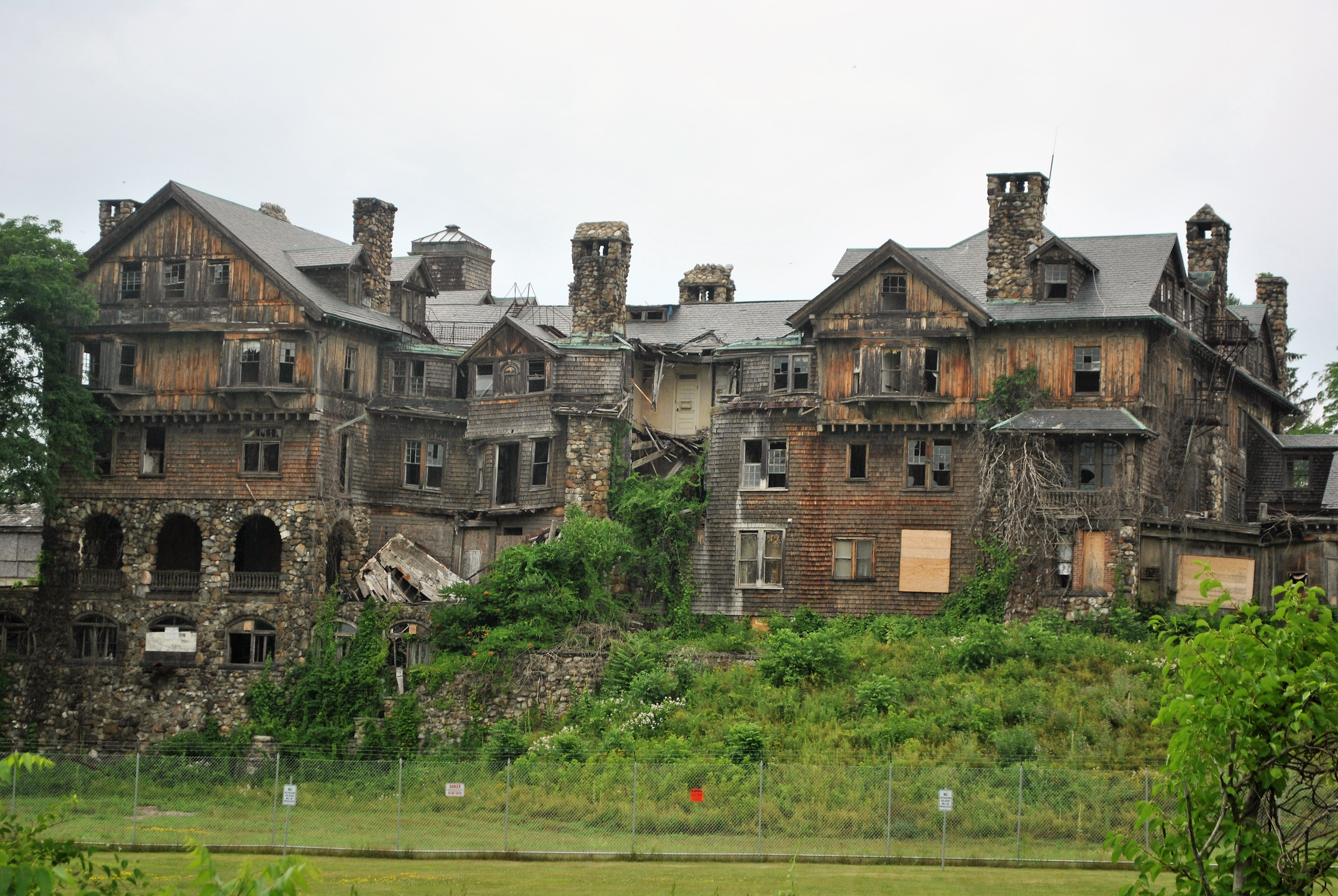
Halcyon Hall in 2016

The main building of Bennett College, Halcyon Hall, was built in 1893 by H. J. Davison Jr., a publisher from New York. The 200-room Queen Anne structure was designed by James E. Ware. It had five stories, a basement and sub-basement. Originally built as a luxury hotel, the building became home to Bennett College in 1907 after the hotel failed to catch on. The Bennett campus also included a chapel, stables, dormitories, an outdoor theater, and the Kettering Science Center, a state of the art building completed in late 1972. The cost of constructing the science building (needed to comply with new state science education requirements), along with other campus upgrades, contributed to the school's bankruptcy.

Halcyon Hall was never reopened and quickly fell into ruin. When the heat was turned off, water pipes burst, causing major water damage throughout the building. Large portions of the roof collapsed and trees could be seen growing through parts of the building. Halcyon Hall was a popular site for urban explorers and photographers, due to its structure and decay.

While several attempts were made in the 1980s to develop the property, all of them failed and the title was taken over by Mechanics and Farmers Savings Bank. The bank itself failed in 1991 and its assets were seized by the Federal Deposit Insurance Corporation.

Halcyon Hall was scheduled to be demolished in 2012. The property was purchased in 2014, with plans to tear down the remains of the building and develop a 32-acre park. In September 2021, demolition began and completed in 2022. Halcyon Hall was the last building standing of Bennett College.

Each building on the Bennett Campus, except for the centerpiece Halcyon Hall and the old Hale House, had asbestos removed before being demolished.

Adjacent to the former Halcyon Hall are the Bennett Commons apartments. These apartments were originally student quarters but upon closure of the school they were bought by a developer.

== Notable alumnae ==
- Nancy Ames
- Judi Andersen
- Jane Forbes Clark
- Ray Eames
- Carmen Mathews
- Mercedes Matter
- Mildred Natwick
- Blaine Trump

== Notable faculty ==
- Ralph Della-Volpe

== See also ==
- List of defunct colleges and universities in New York
