= Blaine Trump =

American socialite, philanthropist, and member of the Trump Family (born 1948)

- Born: Martha Lindley Blaine Beard; 1948 (age 77–78); Mountain Brook, Alabama, U.S.
- Education: International School of the Sacred Heart; American School of Paris; Bennett College; University of Tokyo
- Occupations: Socialite; philanthropist
- Known for: American socialite; Trustee of the American Ballet Theatre
- Spouse(s): Peter Retchin (m. 1970, divorced) Robert Trump (m. 1984; div. 2010)
- Partner: Steve Simon (2010s–present)
- Children: 1

Martha Lindley Blaine Trump (née Beard; born 1948) is an American socialite and philanthropist. For 25 years she was the wife of real-estate heir Robert Trump. She is an ex-sister in law of U.S. President Donald Trump.

== Early life and education ==
Blaine Trump was born Martha Lindley Blaine Beard, and grew up in South Carolina, Florida and Alabama. Her father, Joseph Beard, was a top executive at IBM. Blaine and her family moved to Yokohama due to her father's job when she was ten. There, she attended the International School of the Sacred Heart. She later graduated from the American School of Paris in Louveciennes. She attended Bennett College in Millbrook, New York, and then the University of Tokyo before dropping out to marry Peter Retchin.

== Activity ==
Trump is a trustee of the American Ballet Theatre. In 1998, Trump received the Marietta Tree Award for public service from the New York City citizens' committee.

== Personal life ==
Blaine Trump has been married and divorced twice. First she married Peter Retchin in 1970, with whom she had a child in 1978, Christopher Hollister who is a real estate executive, before getting a divorce.

In 1984 she married Robert Trump, who worked in his property-developer family firm Trump Organization and they were together for 25 years, from 1984 to 2009. In October 2004, Blaine overdosed on pills and was hospitalized at Mount Sinai Hospital in Manhattan, New York after she learned her husband had bought a $3.7 million house on Long Island for his girlfriend, Ann Marie Pallan, who was his secretary for many years. They were involved in a lengthy divorce battle. The divorce was filed in 2007, went to court in 2008, and they reached a secret settlement in 2010. After Robert and Blaine separated, in 2006, after more than 20 years of marriage, they put their 6,500-square-foot, three-unit, three-floor, unfinished co-op residence on the market.

In 2012, Blaine Trump put her $17.5 million mansion in Millbrook, New York, up for sale. Five years later, she and her life partner Steve Simon attended President Donald Trump's inauguration ball in Washington.
