= Hiroko Kuniya =

Japanese news presenter and journalist

- 国谷 裕子
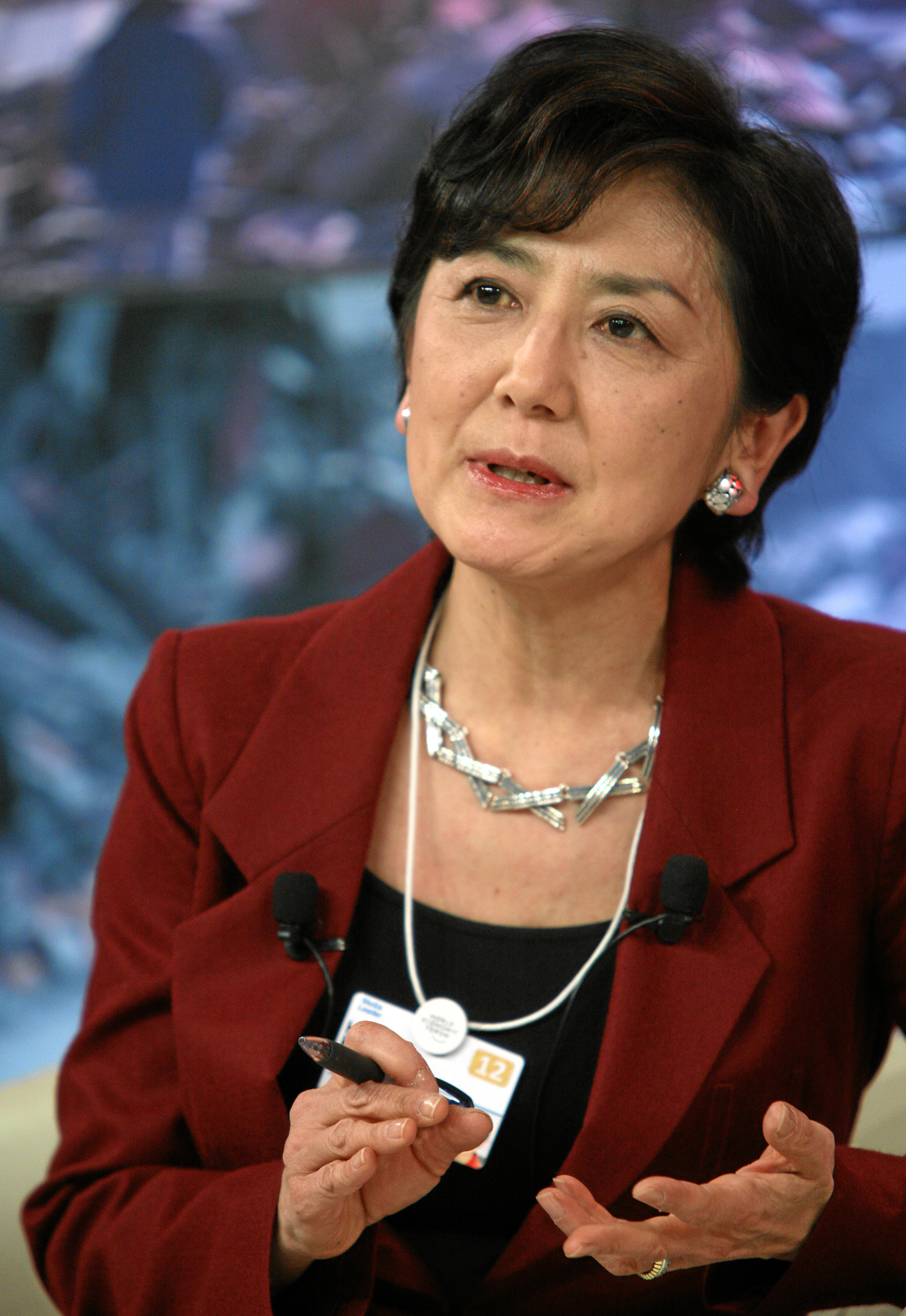
- Hiroko Kuniya at the Annual Meeting 2012 of the World Economic Forum at the congress centre in Davos, Switzerland, January 2012
- Born: Hiroko Kuniya; February 3, 1957 (age 69); Osaka Prefecture, Japan
- Education: Brown University
- Occupations: Announcer; writer; researcher
- Years active: 1981—present
- Television: NHK NEWS TODAY; World News; Today's Close-Up
- Spouse: Shiro Kuniya (m. 1985)
- Relatives: Masajirō Tazuke (great-grandfather)
- Awards: See Awards Received

Hiroko Kuniya (国谷裕子, Kuniya Hiroko) (born February 3, 1957) is a Japanese news presenter and journalist. Kuniya was born in Osaka Prefecture and graduated from International School of the Sacred Heart in 1975 and then Brown University with majors in international relations and international economics. In 1981, she began to work as a news caster and writer for the English-language broadcasts of NHK television's Seven O'clock News. Starting in 1986, she served as a researcher in the United States for NHK Special. Later assignments included satellite and ground network news shows, including Asia Now (1990), which was picked up in the U.S. by Public Broadcasting Service.

== Brief personal life ==
She is from Osaka Prefecture. She is the second daughter of 3 sisters, and due to her father’s overseas service, she spent time in New York and San Francisco (United States of America) from her kindergarten days while going back and forth between Hong Kong and Japan from sixth grade in elementary school to middle school.

She graduated from Tezukayama Gakuin Elementary School, International School of the Sacred Heart and Brown University (Major: The Study of International Relations, Minor: International Economics).

She got a job at Procter & Gamble Sun Home (currently Procter & Gamble (P&G) Japan) and was in charge of sales strategy, but she resigned, saying, “In the end, I thought about why I had to sell as many cakes of soap as possible, my satisfaction ran out and I wound up quitting in a little less than one year.”

She used serving as a simultaneous interpreter, writer and researcher for NHK NEWS (NHK) English Broadcasting as an opportunity to enter the world of news with an introduction from an NHK special correspondent acquaintance. By the age of 26, she registered with a temp agency and the Foreign Correspondents' Club of Japan, and engaged in overseas image checks, research, etc.

In 1985, she married at the age of 28 and went to America due to her husband studying abroad. She became a full-time housewife in New York, but in 1986 she was in charge of the NHK New York General Office’s researchers and since 1987 was in charge of the World News (NHK BS1) newscasters stationed in the United States. She returned to her country in 1988.

After returning to her country, she was in charge of the international segment of NHK NEWS TODAY, which is the successor program to NEWS CENTER 9. She also made contract appearances in NHK NEWS 21 and World News.

Since April 5, 1993, when NHK NEWS 21 ended its program, she served as a regular caster for Today's Close-Up since the start of the program. On December 20, 2015, Kuniya’s resignation was communicated to the person in charge of Today's Close-Up from NHK editor-in-chief Noriyuki Oogi, and due to the program reorganization in fiscal 2016, information on Kuniya’s resignation from the program was reported, and Kuniya’s resignation as newscaster was announced in the news on the date of January 12, the same year.

On the date of April 1, 2016, she took office as a trustee of the Tokyo University of the Arts (in charge of Special Missions for the President and Director of the Diversity Promotion Office). On June 7, 2016, she made her first appearance in commercial broadcasting on Tetsuko’s Room. In January 2017, she published her first book, The Job Called Newscaster, and in March of the same year, she appeared in Kume Bookstore on BS Nippon TV and met Hiroshi Kume for the first time. In October 2017, she took office as the Goodwill Ambassador to Japan for the Food and Agriculture Organization of the United Nations (FAO).

Her husband is Shiro Kuniya, a lawyer (belonging to the Osaka Bar Association). There were even times when he appeared as a guest commentator in “Today's Close-Up”. Takeshi Okada, the former coach of the Japan national football team, was his classmate in his elementary school days.

== Awards received ==
- Hashida Sugako Award (1994)
- 22nd Hoso-Bunka Foundation Prize (Individual/Group Category) (Hiroko Kuniya and the Today's Close-Up program production staff) (1996)
- Broadcast Woman Award '97 (1998)
- 50th Kikuchi Kan Prize (Hiroko Kuniya and the Today's Close-Up program production staff) (2002)
- Japan National Press Club Award (2011)
- 53rd Galaxy Award – Special Award (for achievements as a newscaster in Today's Close-Up) (2016)
- Broadcaster Grand Prix 2016 Grand Prix (2016)
- Social Entrepreneur College “Social Business Grand Prix 2017 Political Entrepreneur Category Grand Prix”

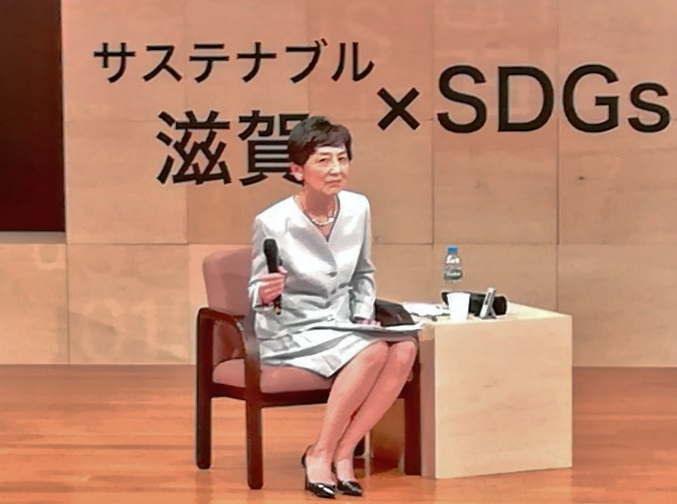
Hiroko Kuniya at a Special Talk about SDGs in Otsu City, Shiga Prefecture

== Written works ==
- The Job Called Newscaster (『キャスターという仕事』, “Kyasutā to Iu Shigoto”), Iwanami Shinsho, 2017, ISBN 9784004316367
- A Book in which SDGs Will Be Understandable, Thinks Hiroko Kuniya (『国谷裕子と考えるSDGsがわかる本』, “Kuniya Hiroko to Kangaeru SDGs ga Wakaru Hon”), Bunkeidou, 2019, ISBN 9784799903018

Co-author

- Trial by Lay Judges which I Want to Ask about Only Here - Answer 31 Questions (『ここだけは聞いておきたい裁判員裁判―31の疑問に答える』, “Kokodake wa Kiiteokitai Saiban'insaiban - 31 no Gimon ni Kotaeru”), co-authored with Yoshihiro Katayama and Satoru Shinomiya, Nippon Hyoron Sha, 2009, ISBN 9784535517004

Translator

- Jason Gaes, I Overcame Cancer – One Boy’s Fight for His Life – An Illustrated Memoir (『ぼくはガンを克服した―ある少年の生への闘い―イラスト手記』, “Boku wa Gan o Kokufukushita - Aru Shounen no Sei e no Tatakai - Irasuto Shuki”; Original Title: My book for kids with cansur), Nihon Housou Shuppan Kyoukai, 1989, ISBN 9784140086407

== Close-up Gendai ==
Since its inception in 1993, Kuniya hosted Close-up Gendai (Today's Close-up), which NHK airs four days weekly in prime time on its ground-based general television network, satellite, and both NHK World and NHK World Premium channels.

The Japan Times reported in January 2016 that NHK was considering making changes to the Close-Up Gendai program, which may include the removal of Kuniya as host. Kuniya's eventual departure from the program in April 2016 came amid media reports of political pressure being exerted on Japanese broadcasters, criticism by visiting United Nations officials investigating freedom of expression and a steep decline in Japan's international ranking of press freedom by Reporters Without Borders.
