= Patty Shwartz =

American judge (born 1961)

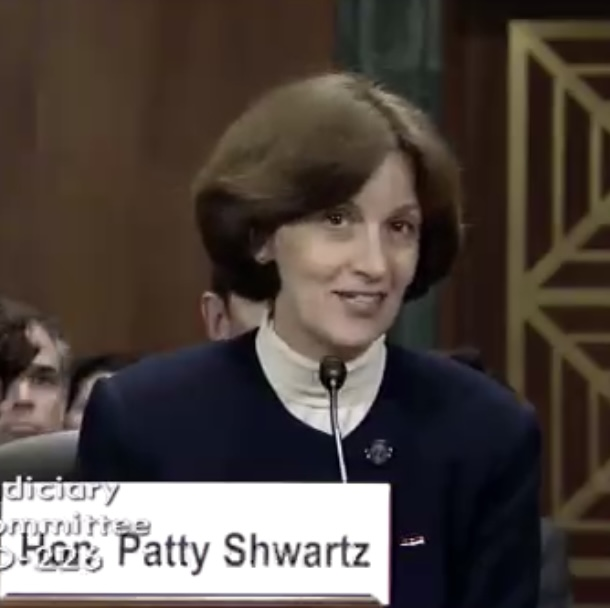

Judge of the United States Court of Appeals for the Third Circuit
- Incumbent
- Assumed office April 10, 2013
- Appointed by: Barack Obama
- Preceded by: Maryanne Trump Barry

Personal details
- Born: 1961 (age 64–65) Paterson, New Jersey, U.S.
- Education: Rutgers University, Newark (BA); University of Pennsylvania (JD)

Patricia Shwartz (born 1961) is a United States circuit judge of the United States Court of Appeals for the Third Circuit.

== Early life and education ==
Shwartz was born in Paterson, New Jersey. She grew up in Pompton Lakes, New Jersey, where she attended Hebrew school and became bat mitzvah at Congregation Beth Shalom. She graduated from Pompton Lakes High School. Shwartz earned her Bachelor of Arts degree from Rutgers University in 1983, with highest honors, and her Juris Doctor from University of Pennsylvania Law School in 1986, where she was a member of the University of Pennsylvania Law Review.

== Legal career ==
After graduating from law school, she worked as an associate at Pepper, Hamilton & Scheetz.

Shwartz clerked for Judge Harold A. Ackerman of the United States District Court for the District of New Jersey from 1987 to 1989. She then worked for the U.S. Attorney's Office for the District of New Jersey from 1989 until 2003. During this time she held the following positions: Deputy Chief of the Criminal Division (1995 to 1999), Chief of the Criminal Division (1999 to 2001 and 2002 to 2003) and Executive Assistant United States Attorney (2001 to 2002). Since 2009, Shwartz had taught as an adjunct professor of law at Fordham University School of Law and Rutgers Law School.

== Federal judicial service ==
=== United States magistrate judge tenure ===
From 2003 to 2013, Shwartz served as a United States magistrate judge of the U.S. District Court for the District of New Jersey.

In 2011, as a magistrate judge, Shwartz sentenced rapper Jeffrey Atkins (Ja Rule) to 28 months in federal prison after he pleaded guilty to failing to file tax returns with the IRS for five tax years, resulting in $1.1 million in tax losses. Ja Rule was also ordered to pay taxes and penalties owed.

=== U.S. Court of Appeals for the Third Circuit ===
Shwartz was recommended for a judgeship on the United States Court of Appeals for the Third Circuit by Senator Frank Lautenberg. On October 5, 2011 she was nominated by President Barack Obama to a judgeship on the United States Court of Appeals for the Third Circuit. The American Bar Association's Standing Committee on the Federal Judiciary unanimously rated Shwartz "well qualified" for the post, the committee's highest rating.

In January 2012, The New York Times reported that New Jersey Senator Bob Menendez had not returned his blue slip for Shwartz's nomination—effectively blocking her nomination, since nominees typically do not go forward without home-state senator support, signified by the return of a blue slip. Menendez gave no public reason why he was blocking the nomination, although The Times noted that Shwartz "has been in a relationship for more than two decades" with the head of the public corruption unit for the U.S. Attorney's Office for the District of New Jersey, which investigated Menendez in 2006 in an inquiry that Menendez has "long contended was politically motivated." Some lawyers and judges in New Jersey speculated that Menendez was "acting out of resentment, rather than any concern about Judge Shwartz's qualifications." Menendez became the first Senate Democrat to block one of President Obama's judicial nominees. The next day, Menendez said that "substantive" rather than personal or "political" concerns about Shwartz's nomination, questioning her "breadth of knowledge of constitutional law." Menendez's opposition effectively derailed her nomination at the time.

On January 13, 2012, after meeting again with Shwartz and having what he characterized as an "in-depth discussion," Menendez announced that he would support Shwartz's nomination and return his blue slip, paving the way for the Senate Judiciary Committee to hold a hearing on Shwartz. The Times reported that in response to Menendez's obstruction, the White House had been declining to nominate U.S. Magistrate Judge Michael A. Shipp, Menendez’s choice, to a vacancy on the District Court for the District of New Jersey. On February 15, 2012, Shwartz received a hearing before the Senate Judiciary Committee. On March 8, 2012, the Judiciary Committee reported her nomination to the floor of the Senate by a 10–6 vote. On January 2, 2013, Shwartz's nomination was returned to the President, due to the sine die adjournment of the Senate. On January 3, 2013, at the beginning of the new Congress, Obama renominated Shwartz to the judgeship. Her nomination was reported to the floor by the Senate Judiciary Committee on February 14, 2013. The Senate confirmed Shwartz on April 9, 2013, by a 64–34 vote. She received her commission the following day.

==== Tenure and noteworthy decisions ====
- In 2018, the Third Circuit upheld, in a 2–1 decision, a New Jersey state law limiting most gun magazines to a maximum capacity of 10 rounds of ammunition. The decision, written by Shwartz, rejected a request by National Rifle Association of America affiliates for a temporary injunction to block the limit from coming into effect. In her decision, Shwartz noted "the significant increase in the frequency and lethality" of mass shootings and active shooter incidents in the United States, and wrote that the law did not contravene the Second Amendment, noting that the law "imposes no limit on the number of firearms or magazines or amount of ammunition a person may lawfully possess." Judge Stephanos Bibas dissented.
- In 2019, the Third Circuit, in a unanimous panel decision by Shwartz, upheld a district court's issuance of a nationwide preliminary injunction that blocked the Trump administration from implementing regulations that would allow additional employers to deny health insurance coverage for contraceptives. Shwartz's decision held that the Affordable Care Act's contraception mandate did not give federal agencies the power to establish such an exemption. In a subsequent decision in 2020, the Supreme Court reversed, upholding the Trump administration regulation.
- In 2019, in a decision written by Shwartz, the Third Circuit upheld the district court's ruling that the Pennsylvania Department of Corrections were not immune from a suit brought by inmate Mumia Abu-Jamal challenging, on cruel and unusual punishment grounds, the department's refusal to provide him with two anti-hepatitis drugs used to treat Hepatitis C. The Third Circuit remanded the case to the district court for further proceedings.
- In 2019, in a decision written by Shwartz, the Third Circuit held that the Commonwealth of Pennsylvania's collection of tolls on the Pennsylvania Turnpike does not violate the Commerce Clause because Congress permitted state authorities to collect such tolls and to use the proceeds for non-Turnpike purposes. The decision also held that the imposition of tolls did not infringe a constitutional right to travel "because plaintiffs have not alleged that their right to travel to, from, and within Pennsylvania has been deterred." The decision upheld a district court decision dismissing the suit brought by the Owner–Operator Independent Drivers Association, a trucking lobby group.
- In July 2020, Shwartz wrote for the unanimous panel when it found that a payday lender owned by the Otoe–Missouria Tribe of Indians could not compel arbitration to defeat a RICO class action lawsuit brought by borrowers because the choice of law clause in the loans had adopted only the tribe's own law.

== Personal life ==
Shwartz is the longtime companion of James Nobile, the head of the public corruption unit for New Jersey's federal prosecutor. She has been a resident of East Rutherford, New Jersey.

== See also ==
- Barack Obama judicial appointment controversies
- List of Jewish American jurists

Legal offices
Preceded by Maryanne Trump Barry	Judge of the United States Court of Appeals for the Third Circuit; 2013–present	Incumbent
