= International School of the Sacred Heart =

- 聖心インターナショナルスクール

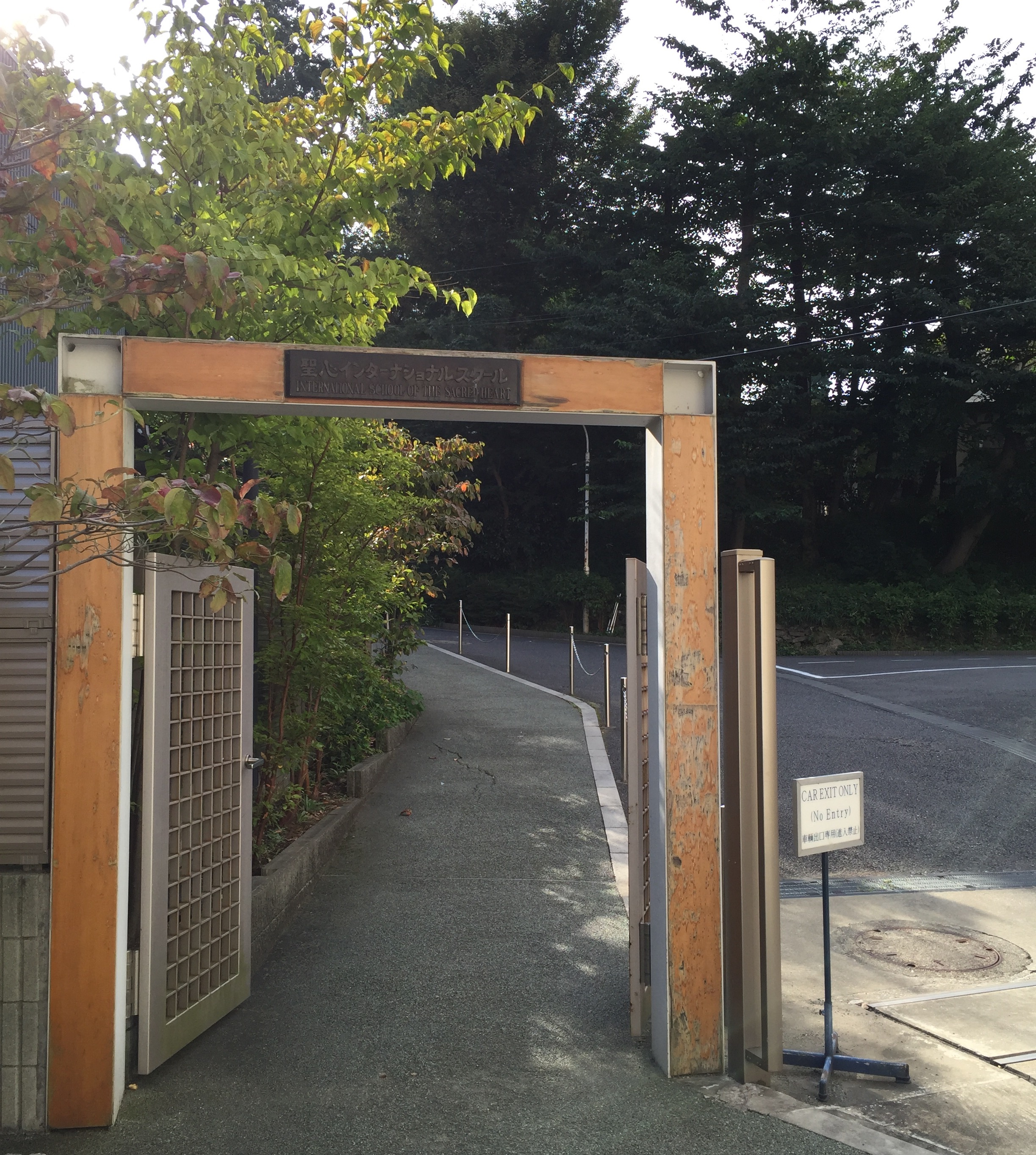
- School gate, 2016

Location
- Hiroo, Tokyo; Japan; 35°39′7″N 139°43′17″E

Information
- Other name: ISSH
- Type: Independent co-educational and single-sex primary and secondary day school
- Religious affiliation: Society of the Sacred Heart
- Denomination: Roman Catholicism
- Established: 1908; 118 years ago
- Educational authority: Japanese Ministry of Education
- Head of school: Anne Wachter
- Staff: 30 (office and support)
- Faculty: 80
- Grades: K-12
- Gender: Year K: co-educational; Year 1-12: Girls only
- Enrollment: 590
- Colors: Navy blue and white
- Athletics: Volleyball, Basketball, Track & Field, Cross Country, Tennis, Soccer
- Mascot: Symbas
- Newspaper: The International
- Affiliations: Alliance of Girls' Schools Australasia; Western Association of Schools and Colleges; Council of International Schools
- Principal of Kindergarten/Junior School: Ellen Yaegashi
- Principal of Middle School: Karen Wilson
- Principal of High School: Charmaine Young
- Website: www.issh.ac.jp

International School of the Sacred Heart (ISSH) is a Kindergarten (co-ed) – Grades 1–12 (all girls) school in Shibuya, Tokyo, Japan, founded in 1908. As part of the Network of Sacred Heart Schools it is affiliated with schools and institutions in 44 countries. The International School of the Sacred Heart (ISSH) is a multicultural Catholic school. Kindergarten classes for 3, 4 and 5 year olds are for boys and girls, while grades 1–12 are for girls only. ISSH is located in the Hiroo neighborhood and was founded in 1908, belonging to a worldwide network of the Schools of the Sacred Heart.

== History ==
The International School of the Sacred Heart in Tokyo is one of an international group of schools and colleges under the direction of the religious Society of the Sacred Heart.

The Society of the Sacred Heart was founded in Amiens, France, on November 21, 1800, by Saint Madeleine Sophie Barat to meet the needs of a particular form of education for girls in a changing world.

Beginning in 2017, the school began investigating allegations of sexual abuse by a former teacher, which allegedly occurred in the 1990s and 2000s.

== Curriculum ==
The curriculum is drawn from International curricula and provides programs such as the Advanced Placement and English as a second language (ESL).

Instruction at the school is in English, Languages including French and Japanese are offered. The testing program includes the PSAT/National Merit Scholarship Qualifying Test, the SAT, and the International Schools Assessment.

The activities program includes athletics, drama, music, as well as competition in sports, intellectual and artistic fields, mainly in the Kanto Plains Association of Schools.

=== Kindergarten and Junior School (Kindergarten – Grade 4) ===
The curriculum in the Kindergarten and Junior School (KG/JS) includes an integrated balanced literacy language arts program, (reading, writing, speaking, and listening), mathematics, science and social studies that are integrated through the International Primary Curriculum.

=== Middle School (Grades 5–8) ===
All Middle School students study English, mathematics, science, social studies, art, drama, foreign languages, music, personal and social education, physical education, pottery/3D Art, and values.

=== High School (Grades 9–12) ===
Sacred Heart has a Creative and Performing Arts department as well as an extracurricular program where students can participate in sports, music, and drama. The ISSH diploma is granted to students who have earned a minimum of 22 credits and have successfully fulfilled all of the requirements.

== Notable alumni ==
- Giselle, rapper and singer (aespa)
- Ippongi Bang, manga artist
- Joan Fontaine, English-American actress
- Hiroko Kuniya, news presenter and journalist
- Hiroe Makiyama, politician
- Maiko, actress
- Emma Miyazawa, actress
- Nako Nakatsuka, researcher working on neurotechnology
- Yoko Narahashi, casting director
- Rima Nakabayashi, rapper and singer (NiziU)
- Masako Shirasu, author and collector
- Blaine Trump, socialite and former sister-in-law of Donald Trump

== See also ==
- List of high schools in Tokyo
- Japan Council of International Schools
- East Asia Regional Council of Overseas Schools
