= Ralph Della-Volpe =

American painter, teacher (1923–2017)

Ralph Della–Volpe
- Born: Ralph Eugene Della–Volpe; May 10, 1923; North Bergen, New Jersey, U.S.
- Died: November 2, 2017 (aged 94); U.S.
- Education: National Academy of Design, Art Students League of New York
- Occupations: Painter, printmaker, teacher
- Movement: Abstraction
- Spouse: Helen Terry (m. ?–2010)
- Children: 3

Ralph Eugene Della–Volpe (May 10, 1923 – November 2, 2017) was an American painter, printmaker, and educator, known for his colorful abstract paintings. He taught at the Art Students League of New York and at Bennett College.

== Life and career ==
Ralph Eugene Della–Volpe was born on May 10, 1923, in North Bergen, New Jersey.

Della–Volpe attended the National Academy of Design in New York City. During World War II, he joined the United States Army and served during D-Day at Utah Beach. He was wounded twice and earned a Purple Heart. When he returned from the war, he enrolled in classes at the Art Students League of New York for the next four years.

Della–Volpe taught drawing and painting courses at Bennett College in Millbrook, New York, and during his 28 year tenure at the school he also served as the chair of the art department.

In 1994, the Warren Street Gallery in Hudson, New York held a retrospective exhibition of his work, titled Della–Volpe: Retrospective 1940–1944. In his later years he continued exhibiting his artwork, and in 2013 at the age of 90, he had a solo exhibition All About Hue II, at Gregory James Gallery in New Milford, Connecticut.

Della–Volpe died at age 94 on November 2, 2017.

His artwork can be found in museum collections, including at the Seattle Art Museum; Syracuse University Art Museum, and Crystal Bridges Museum of American Art in Bentonville, Arkansas.
