= Mary L. Trump =

American psychologist and author (born 1965)

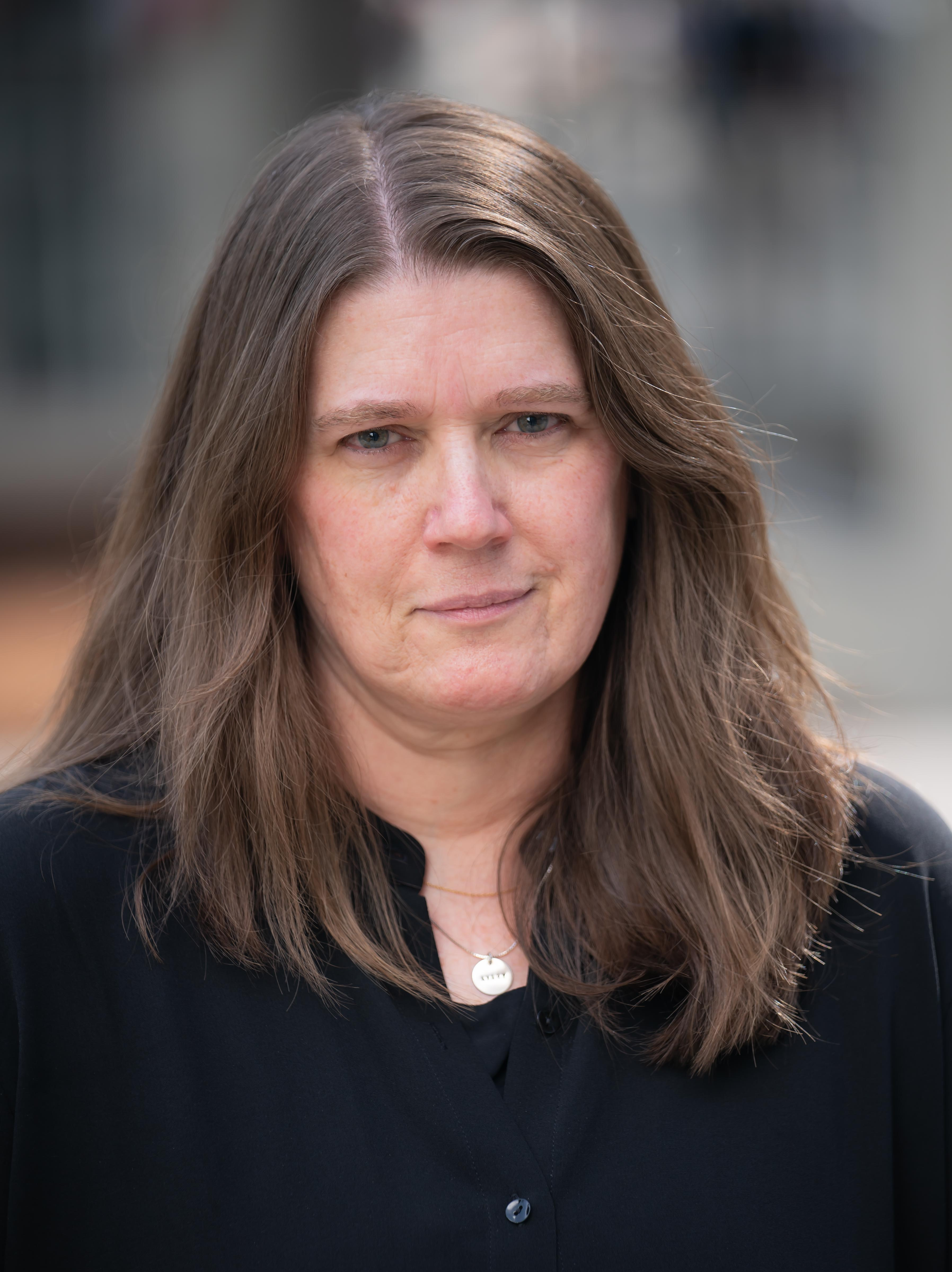
- Trump in 2024
- Born: Mary Lea Trump; May 3, 1965 (age 61); New York City, U.S.
- Education: Tufts University (BA); Columbia University (MA); Adelphi University (PhD)
- Occupations: Psychologist; podcaster; writer
- Political party: Democratic
- Spouse: Ronda Cress (m. 2025)
- Children: 1
- Father: Fred Trump Jr.
- Family: Trump

YouTube information
- Channel: Mary Trump Media
- Years active: 2024–present
- Subscribers: 582,000
- Views: 113,975,206
- Last updated: November 17, 2026

Mary Lea Trump (born May 3, 1965) is an American psychologist, author, and political commentator. She is the niece of Donald Trump through his brother, Fred Trump Jr.

Her first book, Too Much and Never Enough (2020), which recounts her experiences growing up in the Trump family and offers a psychological profile of her uncle, sold nearly one million copies on the day of its release. It was followed by The Reckoning (2021) and Who Could Ever Love You (2024), both of which continued her exploration of trauma, politics, and family dynamics.

In September 2020, Mary Trump filed a lawsuit against her uncle Donald Trump, her aunt Maryanne Trump Barry, and the estate of her late uncle Robert Trump, alleging that they had defrauded her of tens of millions of dollars related to her share of her grandfather Fred Trump's real estate holdings. The case was dismissed in November 2022. In September 2021, Donald Trump filed a countersuit against her, seeking at least $100 million in damages for allegedly providing The New York Times with confidential financial documents used in a 2018 investigation into his wealth and the family's finances; a settlement was reached in June 2026.

== Early life and education ==
Mary Lea Trump was born in May 1965 to flight attendant Linda Lea Clapp and Fred Trump Jr., eldest son of real-estate developer Fred Trump. Mary's older brother is Fred Trump III, who has similarly criticized Donald Trump. When Mary was 16, her father died at 42 of a heart attack caused by alcoholism.

Mary Lea Trump graduated from the Ethel Walker School in 1983. She studied English literature at Tufts University, and earned a master's degree in English literature at Columbia University, for which she studied the works of William Faulkner and his dysfunctional fictional Compson family. She also attained a PhD in clinical psychology from the Derner Institute of Advanced Psychological Studies at Adelphi University.

== Will of Fred Trump Sr. ==
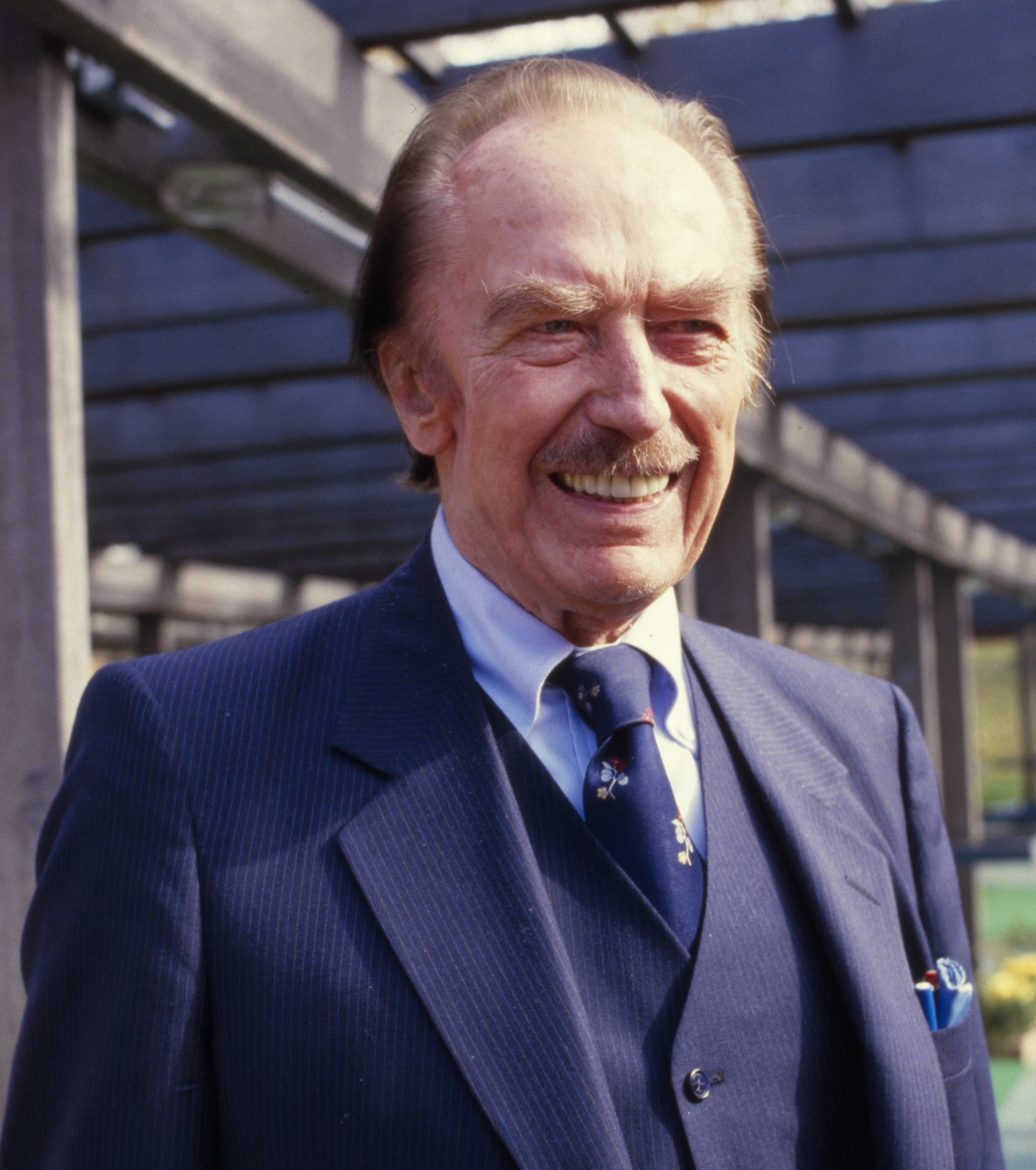
Fred Trump Sr. in the 1980s

Fred Trump Sr.'s will left the bulk of his estate, in equal shares, to his surviving children, while each of his grandchildren were left $200,000. In 1981, when Mary's father predeceased him, Fred Sr.'s lawyers had recommended amending his will, to leave Fred Trump Jr.'s children larger shares than the grandchildren with living parents, writing that "Given the size of your estate, this is tantamount to disinheriting them. You may wish to increase their participation in your estate to avoid ill will in the future." However, Fred Trump Sr. refused to do so.

Fred Sr. was diagnosed with "mild senile dementia" in 1991 and about two years later began to suffer from Alzheimer's disease. Donald Trump, at the time facing financial ruin, sought control of his elderly father's estate, leading to a family fight which The Washington Post described as "epic". When Fred Trump Sr. died in 1999, Mary Trump and her brother, Fred Trump III, contested their grandfather's will.

Shortly after Fred Sr.'s death, Fred III's wife gave birth to a son named William, who was diagnosed with epileptic spasms, a rare and debilitating medical condition requiring a lifetime of care. Fred Sr. had established a foundation that paid the medical expenses of his family. Mary Trump and her brother filed suit against Donald Trump and two of his three living siblings, Maryanne Trump Barry and Robert Trump, for exerting undue influence on the elderly Fred Sr.'s will. In response, Donald, Maryanne and Robert cut Mary and Fred III's medical insurance off, including coverage for William. The lawsuit was settled in 2001, with Mary and Fred III selling their interests in the family business (which included ground leases for two of Fred Sr.'s major properties).

Mary Trump provided financial records, including some Trump family tax returns, to The New York Times for its 2018 exposé on Fred and Donald Trump's finances, which alleges that Fred and the siblings of Fred Jr. – especially Donald – "participated in dubious tax schemes ... including instances of outright fraud", effectively avoiding over $500 million in gift taxes.

Mary Trump sued her uncle Donald, aunt Maryanne, and the estate of her late uncle Robert in September 2020, claiming that they defrauded her of tens of millions of dollars from her interests in Fred Sr.'s real-estate portfolio by undervaluing her interests and coercing her to sign a settlement. The defendants' lawyers asked for dismissal of the lawsuit, claiming that she had waited for too long to file suit. Mary Trump's lawyers responded that "[r]easonable diligence would not have uncovered the fraud" more than a decade earlier. In a January 2022 hearing, lawyers for Donald Trump, Maryanne Trump Barry, and the estate of Robert Trump asked for Mary Trump's lawsuit to be dismissed, arguing that she had waited too long to file her lawsuit because she had had access to the relevant documents since 2001 and that a six-year statute of limitations imposed by the 2001 settlement had expired. The lawsuit was dismissed in November 2022 on the basis that Trump's 2001 settlement agreement had "unambiguously released defendants from unknown claims, including fraud claims". She made an appeal request, which was denied on June 22, 2023.

In September 2021, Donald Trump filed a lawsuit against his niece and The New York Times (namely the authors of the 2018 exposé) for over $100 million. The suit accuses Mary Trump and the three New York Times journalists of utilizing confidential documents in an "insidious" conspiracy against Donald. Mary called the suit an act of "desperation". In a January 2023 hearing, a lawyer for the Times argued that the truthfulness of the exposé outweighed other considerations. Donald's lawyer Alina Habba singled out Mary's use of a burner phone to communicate with the Times, the counsel for which argued was merely to protect its source. A New York Supreme Court justice dismissed the Times from the suit on May 3, 2023, and ordered Donald to pay its legal fees (which neared $400,000) on the basis that his assertions lacked constitutional merit and that, owing to the First Amendment, "reporters are entitled to engage in legal and ordinary news gathering activities without fear of tort liability".

A June 2023 ruling allowed Donald to pursue his claim against Mary, which she appealed. The appeals court ruled in May 2024 to let the case proceed, stating that there was "a substantial basis in law" for breach of contract but that the duration of the confidentiality agreement needed to be determined and that Donald had to prove whether the disclosure had caused him any damages. In June 2025, a state judge ruled that Donald could pursue his claim while president of the United States. A year later, the two settled the lawsuit, the terms of which were not disclosed.

== Career ==
Mary Trump worked for one year at the Manhattan Psychiatric Center while working on her PhD research. She is a contributor to the book Diagnosis: Schizophrenia, published by Columbia University Press in 2001. Trump has taught graduate courses in developmental psychology, trauma, and psychopathology. She is the founder and CEO of The Trump Coaching Group, a life-coaching company, and has also owned and operated a number of small businesses in the Northeast.

=== Too Much and Never Enough (2020) ===
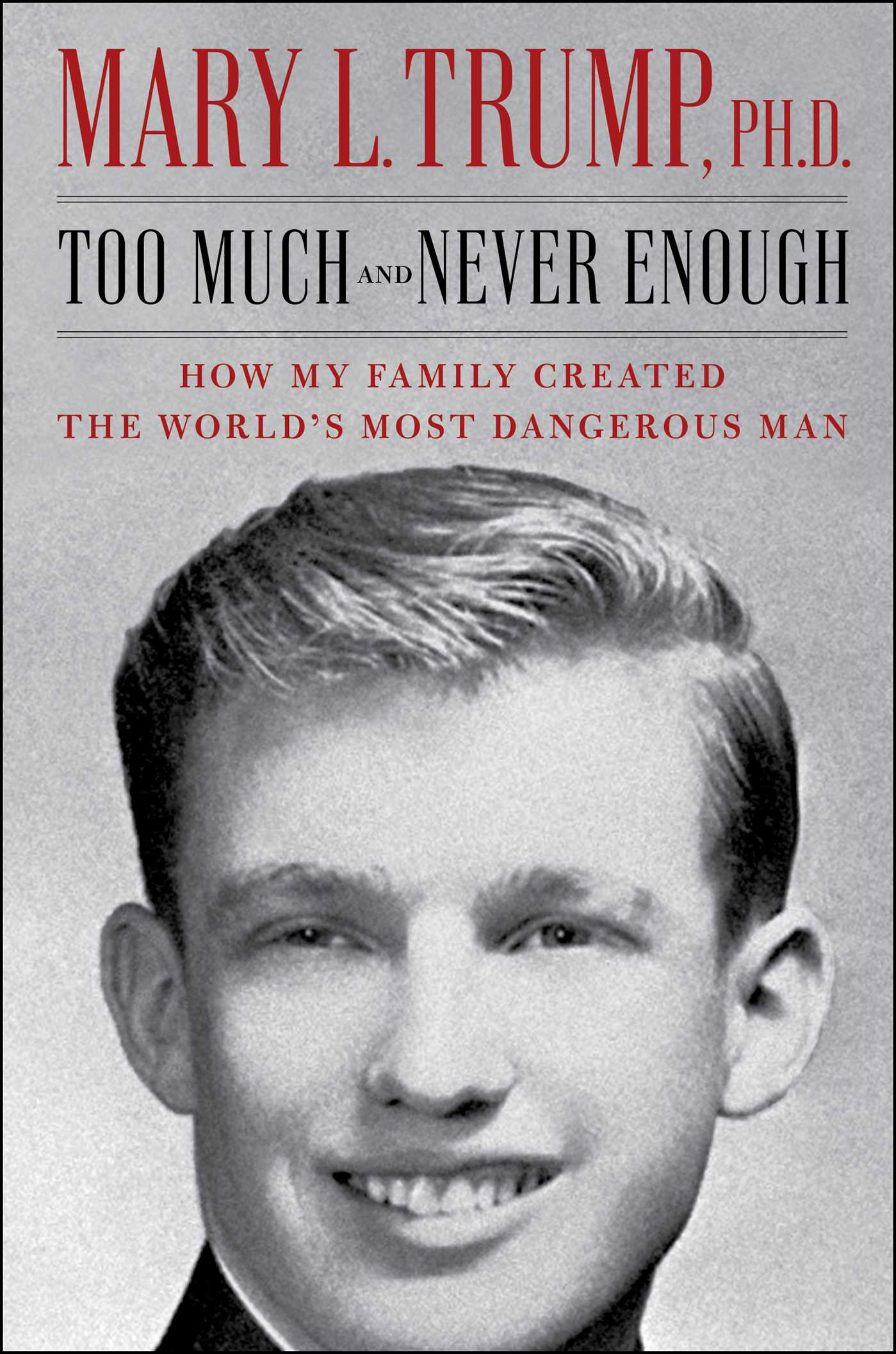
Front cover of Too Much and Never Enough (2020)

Mary Trump's first book, Too Much and Never Enough: How My Family Created the World's Most Dangerous Man, is an unauthorized biography of Donald Trump published on July 14, 2020, by Simon & Schuster. According to Mary Trump's note at the beginning of it, all accounts in the book come either from her own memory or from recorded conversations with family, friends, and others. Other sources are legal, financial and family documents, email correspondence, and the New York Times investigative article by David Barstow, Susanne Craig, and Russ Buettner. The book details how Mary Trump was the anonymous source who provided The New York Times with Trump family tax returns. The New York Times report won the 2019 Pulitzer Prize.

Upon the announcement of Too Much and Never Enough in June 2020, Mary's uncle Robert Trump attempted to block its release, stating that she signed a non-disclosure agreement as part of the 2001 lawsuit settlement. The filing of a temporary restraining order against Mary Trump was dismissed by a New York court for a lack of jurisdiction, and the book was published on July 14, 2020.

The book surpassed one million copies on its first day of sales. It went Number 1 in the U.S., Canada, the U.K., and Ireland, and No. 2 in Australia.

=== The Reckoning (2021) ===
Trump's second book, The Reckoning: Our Nation's Trauma and Finding a Way to Heal, was published by St. Martin's Press on August 17, 2021. Drawing from American history, Trump posits that the country has suffered trauma from its inception because of its inclusion of systemic racism and its failure to address the existence of white supremacy, especially by Republicans in recent decades.

=== Who Could Ever Love You (2024) ===
Trump's third book, Who Could Ever Love You (2024), is a memoir of her experiences related to her father's contempt in the eyes of Fred Sr. and resultant downfall.

=== The Mary Trump Show ===
Trump has a podcast, titled The Mary Trump Show, on which she discusses politics and other matters. On February 1, 2022, she announced that she would be removing her show from Spotify to protest alleged COVID-19 misinformation being spread on The Joe Rogan Experience, which was exclusively distributed on Spotify.

== Politics ==
Mary Trump supported Hillary Clinton during the 2016 presidential election.

In 2018, David Barstow, Susanne Craig and Russ Buettner of The New York Times published "an exhaustive 18-month investigation of Donald Trump's finances that debunked his statements of self-made wealth and revealed a business empire riddled with tax dodges", for which they were awarded the 2019 Pulitzer Prize in Explanatory Reporting. Trump has stated that she was a key source of information for that study, having come into possession of Donald Trump's tax documents during the discovery process in the dispute over her grandfather's estate.

On July 15, 2020, Mary Trump said in an ABC News interview conducted by George Stephanopoulos that Donald Trump should resign as president, as he was "utterly incapable of leading this country, and it's dangerous to allow him to do so". In an interview later that month on The Late Show with Stephen Colbert, Mary Trump stated that Donald Trump exhibited sociopathic tendencies but not at a high-functioning level like his father. She said the president was institutionally insulated from responsibilities throughout his childhood and was never held accountable for his actions.

After the January 6 United States Capitol attack, Mary Trump said her uncle should be "barred from ever running for public office again."

== Personal life ==
Mary Trump identifies as lesbian. In Too Much and Never Enough, she makes a brief reference to the fact and states that "Nobody in the family knew; they'd always been spectacularly uninterested in my personal life… and never asked about my boyfriends or relationships." She wrote that her grandmother, Mary Anne MacLeod Trump, once referred to Elton John as a "faggot", and consequently, Mary Trump decided not to come out and tell her grandmother or other immediate family that she was going to marry a woman, with whom she would later raise a daughter. She has since divorced, and lives on Long Island, New York, with her daughter, who was conceived by in-vitro fertilization via a sperm donor.

Mary Trump married Ronda Cress in a private ceremony in October 2025. She is a vegetarian and an atheist.
