= Joel A. Pisano =

American judge (1949–2021)

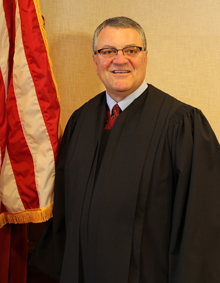

Judge of the United States District Court for the District of New Jersey
- In office February 16, 2000 – February 16, 2015
- Appointed by: Bill Clinton
- Preceded by: Maryanne Trump Barry
- Succeeded by: John Michael Vazquez

Magistrate Judge of the United States District Court for the District of New Jersey
- In office 1991–2000

Personal details
- Born: March 3, 1949 Orange, New Jersey, U.S.
- Died: February 26, 2021 (aged 71)
- Education: Lafayette College (BA); Seton Hall University School of Law (JD)

Joel A. Pisano (March 3, 1949 – February 26, 2021) was a United States district judge of the United States District Court for the District of New Jersey from 2000 to 2015. He served as a United States magistrate judge of the same court from 1991 to 2000.

== Early life and education ==
Born in Orange, New Jersey, Pisano graduated from Belleville High School, received a Bachelor of Arts degree from Lafayette College in 1971 and a Juris Doctor from Seton Hall University School of Law in 1974.

== Career ==
Pisano was an assistant deputy public defender in the New Jersey Office of the Public Defender from 1974 to 1978. He was in private practice in New Jersey from 1978 to 1991.

== Judicial service ==
Pisano was a United States magistrate judge of the District of New Jersey from 1991 to 2000. On September 22, 1999, Pisano was nominated by President Bill Clinton to a seat on the United States District Court for the District of New Jersey vacated by the elevation of Maryanne Trump Barry to the Third Circuit. Pisano was confirmed by the United States Senate on February 10, 2000, and received his commission on February 16, 2000. He retired from active service on February 16, 2015.

== Death ==
Pisano died on February 26, 2021, at the age of 71.

Legal offices
Preceded by Maryanne Trump Barry	Judge of the United States District Court for the District of New Jersey; 2000–2015	Succeeded by John Michael Vazquez
