= Masajirō Tazuke =

Masajirō Tazuke (田附 政次郎, Tazuke Masajirō) (December 15, Bunkyū Year 3 (January 23, 1864) – April 26, Shōwa's 8th Year (1933)) was a Japanese Ōmi merchant and businessman. He became director of Ōsaka Spinning. He participated in the founding of Toyobo, Nisshinbo Holdings and Gosho (currently Kanematsu). Moreover, he was called "General Tazuke" because he participated actively as a cotton yarn speculator. He was renowned as "Tazuke for Sale". He was the great-grandfather of Hiroko Kuniya, the News presenter.

== Personal Profile ==
He was born in currently Higashiōmi City, Shiga Prefecture in Bunkyū Year 3 (1863). He opened the Tazuke Store, one of Semba's Eight Companies, and was a presence that led cotton trade and the cotton industry. Moreover, as contributions to society, he had established the Tazuke Kōfūkai Incorporated Foundation in Kyōto University, the Gohō Kōfūkai Public Interest Incorporated Foundation in Gohō Village, his hometown, Tezukayama Gakuin, Kitano Hospital in Ōsaka City, etc. Also as a speculator, he became renowned as "Tazuke for Sale", and has left behind the saying "Once they know it, it's over" or something. Masajirō Tazuke II is his adopted son-in-law. Through the managing director of Sanwa Bank, Masao Tazuke (Masajirō Tazuke III), the Sanwa Capital consultant, Ōsaka Kaseihin director, Isuzu Motors auditor and Tezukayama Gakuin and Kitano Hospital director, is the eldest son of the adopted child. Chūbē Itō, the founder of Itochu and Marubeni, was his uncle. Hiroko Kuniya, who was the newscaster of NHK news program "Today's Close-Up" from April 1993 to March 2016, is his granddaughter.

== Life ==
=== Up to Adolescence ===
Masajirō Tazuke was born in December 15, Bunkyū Year 3 (January 23, 1864) as the eldest son of Jingorō Tazuke and his wife Sei in Sasō, Gohō Village, Kanzaki District, Ōmi (Currently Sasō Town, Higashiōmi City, Shiga Prefecture through Notogawa Town). As for siblings, he had Tetsujirō (later Tetsujirō Sotomi) for a younger brother. It is said that father Jingorō had conducted the peddling of kimono fabrics and his mother Sei had conducted the making of hemp cloth. In Meiji's 4th Year (1871), his father Jingorō, who had been lying down for a long time from illness, died, and the husband of his elder sister inherited the family business. It has been said that his mother's younger brother Chūbē Itō became his little brother's guardian, Masajirō attended Sasō's private elementary school and at the age of eleven, he was an excellent child such as lending assistance to the teacher as an assistant teacher.

In Meiji's 9th Year (1876), Masajirō entered "Benchū" in Hon Town, Ōsaka, which his uncle Chūbē manages, as an apprentice. In Meiji's 11th Year (1878), he conducted the peddling of kimono fabric and cotton goods in his hometown, and in August Meiji's 21st Year (1888), he married Sadaemon Tsukamoto's third daughter Tomoko in Minamigokashō Village, Kanzaki District (now Higashiōmi City). The following year, in Meiji's 22nd Year (1889), he set up a store that dealt in cotton, flannel, etc. in Azuchi Town, Higashi Ward, Ōsaka City. Furthermore, the store that he opened in Ōsaka joined the brokers of the Ōsaka Three Staples, and in Meiji's 35th Year (1902), he built a store anew in Hon Town, Ōsaka and it became the "Tazuke Store", and it was counted as one of Semba's 8 companies as a cotton yarn wholesale store. Moreover, it become the place for speculator Masajirō's activities.

=== Canequim Weaving Era ===
In Meiji's 23rd Year (1890), Masajirō had just fallen on difficult times such as contracting a serious illness and his child dying young. In October, he entered Canequim Weaving Co., Ltd. that then important people among Ōmi merchants such as Ichirobei Abe, Ichitarō Abe, Shinsuke Koizumi, Teijirō Nishikawa and Jihē Nakamura founded through the introduction of his uncle Chūbē and the strong recommendation of then Shiga Prefectural Governor Hiroshi Nakai, and although he temporarily retired from the company, he was appointed as director in Meiji's 33rd Year (1900). In Canequim Weaving, Masajirō, together with Fusajirō Abe and Zensuke Fujii, conducted the merging with Ōsaka Spinning (June Meiji's 39th Year (1906)) and the purchasing of the mills belonging to Kyōto Heian Spinning, and due to the merger with Ōsaka Spinning (now the parent organization of Toyobo), Canequim Weaving was dissolved (Furthermore, Masajirō and Fusajirō continued to serve as directors of Ōsaka Spinning and Zensuke became an auditor).

=== The Founding of Gosho ===
On the occasion of the purchasing of the Kyōto Heian Spinning mills in Meiji's 38th Year (1905), Canequim Weaving purchased the Fushimi mills, and they ended up taking over the Kyōto mills because a silent partnership was established. This silent partnership was financed and established mainly by four people: Masajirō Tazuke, Fusajirō Abe, Zensuke Fujii and Yohei Kitagawa, who was from Shiga Prefecture (currently Takamiya, Hikone City) and conducted brokerage business of imported cotton yarn, etc. After that, they merged with the spinning mills that Kitagawa had owned and changed it to "Kitagawa Kyōto Spinning Site", and in December Meiji's 38th Year (1905), they reorganized the silent partnership into Gosho Limited Partnership Company. Gosho established its headquarters in Higashi Ward, Ōsaka City (After this, Gosho merged with Kanematsu in Shōwa's 42nd Year (1967) and became Kanematsu-Gosho (currently Kanematsu)).

Furthermore, apart from their activities in Ōsaka, Masajirō, Fusajirō and Zensuke also conducted various activities together in their hometowns. In Meiji's 41st Year (1908), he founded "The Kanzaki Business Club" in his hometown, and he supported and allowed Zensuke Fujii to be elected in the Imperial Diet House of Representatives Member Election of May Meiji's 41st Year (1908). In Taishō's 8th Year (1919), he founded "The Japan Cotton Thread Manufacturing Company" in his hometown of Notogawa, Kanzaki District and devoted himself to his hometown's industrial development (They changed the name to Kotō Spinning Company in Shōwa's 4th Year (1929), and before the Pacific War, it had grown into a corporation in which the number of employees exceeded 1000 people, but it integrated into Nisshinbo due to the integration of corporations in times of war).

On April 26, Shōwa's 8th Year (1933), Masajirō died of a heart attack at the Itō residence in Ashiya, Hyōgo Prefecture. It has been said that he viewed haiku as a hobby all his life.

== Anecdotes ==
Chūbē Itō, who was in the middle of recuperation from an illness in Suma, frequently summoned Masajirō Tazuke, who was his nephew, to his retreat. It is said that Chūbē talked to Masajirō "about the store rules of the Marubeni Store" there. It has been said that at a time like that, Masajirō stated to his uncle, "I am bad at building a lot of stores and hiring and training a lot of people, but as for making a lot of money, I intend to make even more than Uncle."

Zensuke Fujii, who was a sworn friend of Masajirō, has described the matter of Masajirō as "Since he was a person who pushed forward believing that he was the best, he was lacking in a compromising nature, and so he also had a lot of enemies."

== Speculator "General Tazuke" ==
Masajirō Tazuke played an active part in cotton yarn speculation, and it is said that he came out on top by viewing selling as his specialty; he was called "General Tazuke" by the world. General Tazuke has left behind some wise sayings in the context of carrying out speculation.

- "Once they know it, it's over" (Factors that have become well-known facts are not profitable and are meaningless things for speculation)
- "If you touch a ripe persimmon, it will have no choice but to fall" (As a red ripe persimmon falls instantly because of a trivial thing, so an excessive ceiling price reacts to a small adverse stock market factor and a chain of price falls occurs)
- "You must sell, you must buy, you must suspend" (At the time of easy-to-profit (simple) speculation, you have to begin "selling" and "buying" without reservation, but when it has become hard-to-profit speculation, you will cut your losses and suspend it completely)

== Social Work ==
Kanzaki District Kanzaki Commercial School (currently Shiga Prefectural Yōkaichi-Minami High School)
In June Meiji's 39th Year (1906), when Canequim Weaving merged with Ōsaka Spinning, Masajirō Tazuke, Fusajirō Abe and Zensuke Fujii ended up receiving retirement pay because Canequim Weaving had been temporarily liquidated. And so the three men pooled their retirement pay and used the funds for "building a commercial school in Kanzaki District". The establishment of "Kanzaki Business School" was approved in February Meiji's 40th Year (1907), the school building was completed in June in the following year, and they changed its name to "Kanzaki District Kanzaki Commercial School" (It changed over to a prefectural establishment in Taishō's 10th Year (1921)) in February Meiji's 43rd Year (1910).

Tezukayama Gakuin
As Ōsaka developed, as there were not many places for girls' education, in February Taishō's 5th Year (1916), Isamu Asano, the principal of Private Momoyama Junior High School, and Kumakichi Ishitani, a teacher at the same school, sought cooperation with the Ōsaka financial circle and proposed the establishment of a gakuin to Ichirobē Yamada, Yosaburō Yagi, Tōsuke Yamamoto (II) and Masajirō Tazuke. Masajirō and the others gladly agreed to cooperate, and in August 14 the same year, 5 people, including Masajirō Tazuke, became the promoters, and applied to the Minister of Education for approval of the establishment of Private Tezukayama Gakuin Incorporated Foundation and it was approved in December 21. At first, it was only an elementary school, but they welcomed new students in April of the following year and conducted "the opening ceremony of Tezukayama Gakuin" in May after the completion of the new school building. Those 2 years later, they opened a kindergarten department and 10 years later, in Taishō's 15th Year (1924), they opened a department of women's studies (girls' high school). Masajirō cooperated with the school management as director until the time before he died.

Tazuke Kōfūkai Public Interest Incorporated Foundation
On October 10, Taishō's 14th Year (1923), Masajirō Tazuke founded the Tazuke Kōfūkai Public Interest Incorporated Foundation with "the aim of carrying out comprehensive research with respect to medical science as well as contributing to the promotion and growth of arts and sciences, science and technology, and culture", and opened a hospital for the use of a clinical medicine research institute (currently Kitano Hospital, The Tazuke Kofukai Medical Research Institute) in Shōwa's 3rd Year (1928).

Gohō Kōfūkai Public Interest Incorporated Foundation
On the first anniversary of Masajirō Tazuke's death, the Gohō Kōfūkai Public Interest Incorporated Foundation was founded, and it inherited Masajirō's last wishes and has been providing support and subsidies to projects with respect to the promotion of education, growth of self-government and improvement of welfare in his hometown Notogawa.

== Related works ==
- 'Unreserved Talk on the Cotton Trade Machine World Continued Discussion: Commemorating the Twentieth Anniversary of Cotton Trade Weekly's First Issue' (「綿業機界放言続話 綿業週報創刊二十週年記念」, 'Mengyō Kikai Hōgen Zoku Hanashi: Mengyō Shūhō Sōkan Nijusshūnen Kinen') (By Masajirō Tazuke, Tazuke Store, 1925)
- 'The Legend of Masajirō Tazuke' (「田附政次郎伝」, 'Tazuke Masajirō Den') (Edited by Teizō Itō, Tazuke Store, 1935)
- 'Unreserved Talk on the Cotton Trade Machine World Collection' (「綿業機界放言集」, 'Mengyō Kikai Hōgen Shū') (By Masajirō Tazuke, Edited by Teizō Itō, Tazuke Store, 1936)
