= John Joseph Kitchen =

American judge (1911–1973)

Judge of the United States District Court for the District of New Jersey
- In office October 16, 1970 – September 21, 1973
- Appointed by: Richard Nixon
- Preceded by: Seat established by 84 Stat. 294
- Succeeded by: Henry Curtis Meanor

Personal details
- Born: John Joseph Kitchen; December 29, 1911 Camden, New Jersey
- Died: September 21, 1973 (aged 61) Woodbury, New Jersey
- Education: University of Pennsylvania (A.B.); Rutgers Law School (LL.B.)

John Joseph Kitchen (December 29, 1911 – September 21, 1973) was a United States district judge of the United States District Court for the District of New Jersey.

== Education and career ==
Born in Camden, New Jersey, Kitchen received an Artium Baccalaureus degree from the University of Pennsylvania in 1933 and a Bachelor of Laws from South Jersey Law School (now Rutgers Law School) in 1937. He was a clerk for the Registrar of Deeds for Camden County, New Jersey from 1938 to 1939. He was in private practice in Woodbury, New Jersey from 1939 to 1942. He was a special agent for the Federal Bureau of Investigation from 1942 to 1946. He was a deputy state attorney general of New Jersey from 1946 to 1953. He was in private practice in Woodbury from 1946 to 1962. He was the township solicitor for Logan Township, New Jersey from 1947 to 1961. He was the township solicitor for Mantua Township, New Jersey from 1960 to 1962. He was a judge of the Municipal Court of West Deptford Township, New Jersey from 1955 to 1959. He was a judge of the Municipal Court of Westville, New Jersey from 1957 to 1959. He was a judge of the Superior Court of Gloucester County, New Jersey from 1962 to 1970.

== Federal judicial service ==
Kitchen was nominated by President Richard Nixon on October 7, 1970, to the United States District Court for the District of New Jersey, to a new seat created by 84 Stat. 294. He was confirmed by the United States Senate on October 13, 1970, and received his commission on October 16, 1970. Kitchen served in that capacity until his death of an apparent heart attack on September 21, 1973, at Underwood Memorial Hospital (now Inspira Health Network) in Woodbury.

== Sources ==
Legal offices
Preceded by Seat established by 84 Stat. 294	Judge of the United States District Court for the District of New Jersey; 1970–1973	Succeeded by Henry Curtis Meanor
