= Maryanne Trump Barry =

American judge (1937–2023)

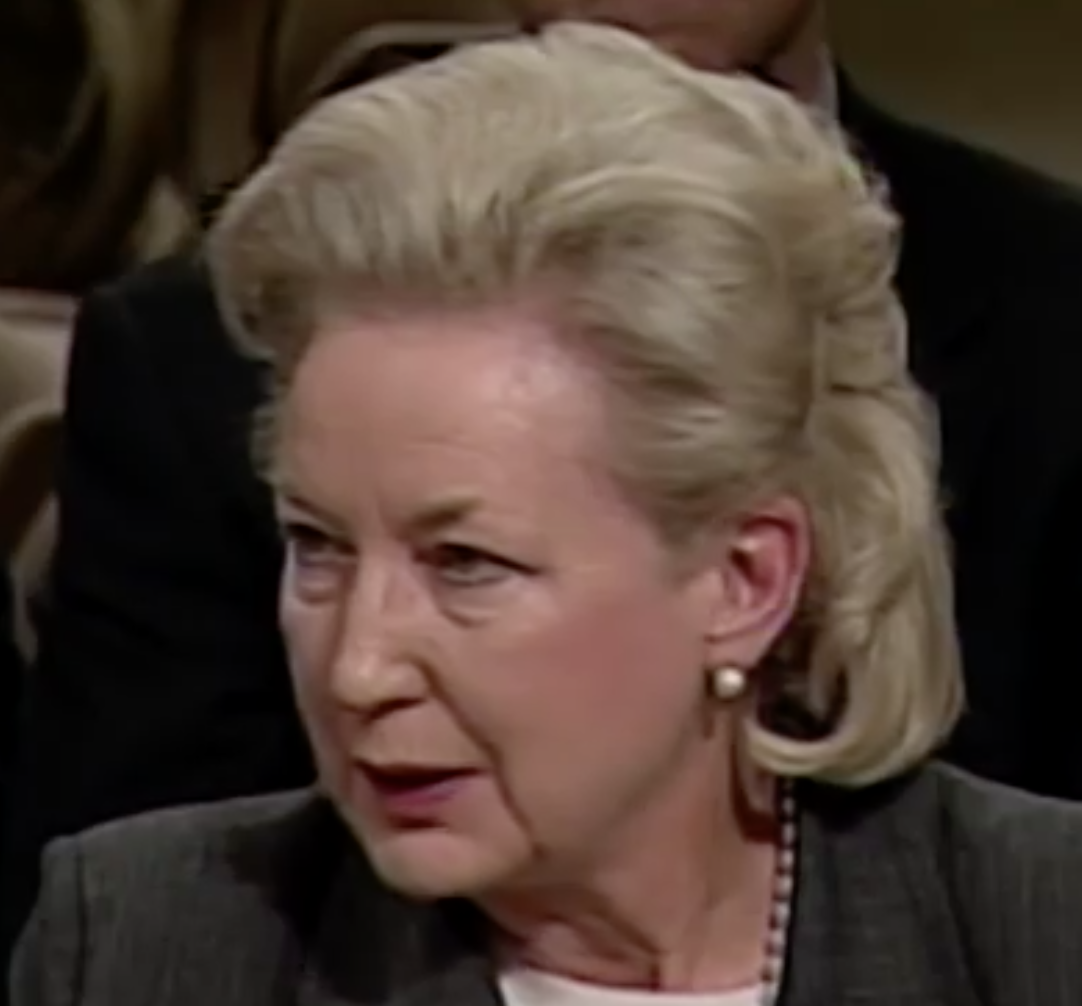
- Barry in 2006

Senior Judge of the United States Court of Appeals for the Third Circuit
- In office June 30, 2011 – February 11, 2019

Judge of the United States Court of Appeals for the Third Circuit
- In office September 22, 1999 – June 30, 2011
- Appointed by: Bill Clinton
- Preceded by: H. Lee Sarokin
- Succeeded by: Patty Shwartz

Judge of the United States District Court for the District of New Jersey
- In office October 7, 1983 – October 25, 1999
- Appointed by: Ronald Reagan
- Preceded by: Henry Curtis Meanor
- Succeeded by: Joel A. Pisano

Personal details
- Born: Maryanne Trump; April 5, 1937 New York City, U.S.
- Died: November 13, 2023 (aged 86) New York City, U.S.
- Party: Republican
- Spouses: David Desmond (m. 1959; div. 1980) John J. Barry (m. 1982; died 2000)
- Children: 1
- Parents: Fred Trump; Mary Anne MacLeod Trump
- Relatives: Trump family
- Education: Mount Holyoke College (BA); Columbia University (MA); Hofstra University (JD)

Maryanne Trump Barry (née Trump; April 5, 1937 – November 13, 2023) was an American attorney and United States federal judge. She became an assistant United States attorney in 1974 and was first appointed to the United States District Court for the District of New Jersey by President Ronald Reagan in 1983. In 1999, she was appointed to the United States Court of Appeals for the Third Circuit by Bill Clinton.

In January 2006, Barry testified before the U.S. Senate Judiciary Committee in support of the nomination of her colleague Samuel Alito to the U.S. Supreme Court. She took senior status in June 2011, and announced her retirement from the bench in February 2019 after an investigation was launched into allegations that she had committed judicial misconduct by participating in fraudulent tax and financial transactions.

Barry was the eldest sister of 45th and 47th president of the United States, Donald Trump.

== Early life and education ==
Barry was born Maryanne Trump in the Queens borough of New York City on April 5, 1937, the first child of real estate developer Fred Trump and his wife Mary Anne MacLeod Trump. She was the eldest sister of Donald Trump. She attended Kew-Forest School. She graduated cum laude with a BA from Mount Holyoke College in 1958, and an MA in public law and government from Columbia University in 1962. She later attended law school, earning her JD from Hofstra University School of Law in 1974.

== Career ==
=== U.S. Attorney's Office ===
After being a homemaker for 13 years, Barry became an assistant United States attorney in 1974, one of only two women out of 62 lawyers in the office of the United States Attorney for the District of New Jersey. She was in the civil division from 1974 to 1975 and in the appeals division from 1976 to 1982, serving as deputy chief of that division from 1976 to 1977 and chief of the division from 1977 to 1982. She served as Executive Assistant United States Attorney from 1981 to 1982. She was First Assistant United States Attorney from 1981 to 1983.

=== Federal judicial service ===
==== U.S. District Court service ====
On September 14, 1983, Barry was nominated by President Ronald Reagan to a seat on the United States District Court for the District of New Jersey vacated by Henry Curtis Meanor. She was confirmed by the United States Senate on October 6, 1983, and received her commission the next day. According to her niece Mary L. Trump, Donald Trump influenced his lawyer Roy Cohn to get Barry the commission, which Donald held over Barry, prompting her to state that she had earned the position.

In 1985, she recused herself in a drug-trafficking case due to her brother Donald's relationship with the accused trafficker. Her service in the district court ended on October 25, 1999, when she was elevated to the court of appeals.

Barry's reputation on the bench was that of a tough judge with strong command of her courtroom. In 1989, while a district court judge in Newark, New Jersey, she disapproved a plea bargain that would have freed two county detectives accused of protecting a drug dealer, and forced the case to trial. The detectives were convicted and received jail terms. She also presided over the conviction of Louis Manna, the Genovese crime family mobster accused of plotting to assassinate rival John Gotti.

==== U.S. Court of Appeals service ====
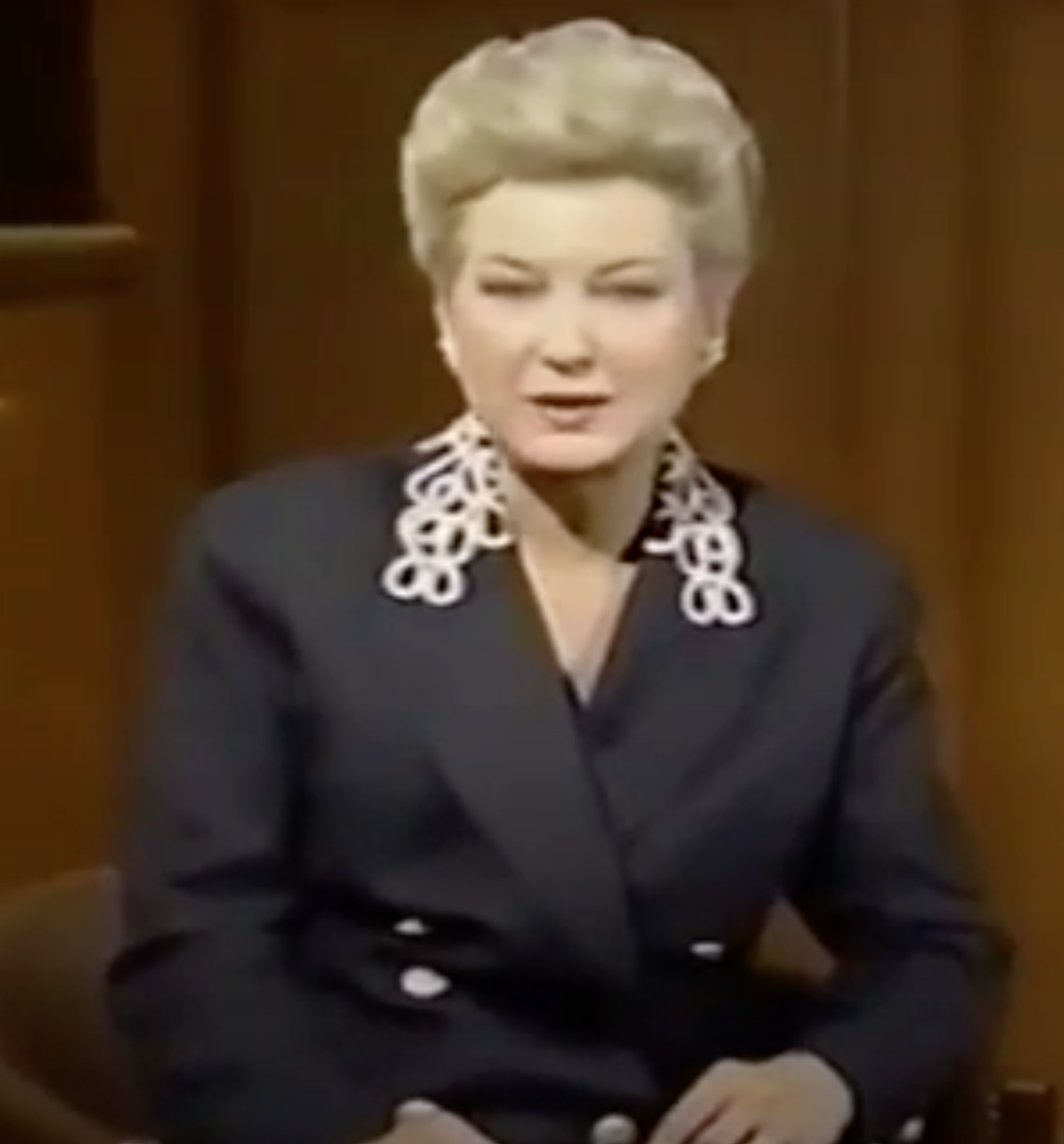
Barry in 1992

A Republican, Barry was nominated to serve on the U.S. Court of Appeals for the Third Circuit by Democratic President Bill Clinton on June 17, 1999. She was nominated to fill the vacancy created when H. Lee Sarokin retired in 1996. (Clinton had nominated Robert Raymar to the seat in 1998, but that nomination expired at the end of that year without being given a hearing by the Senate Judiciary Committee.)

The U.S. Senate unanimously confirmed Barry on September 13, 1999. She received her commission on September 22, 1999. Barry told the New Jersey Law Journal in 1999 that she was "deeply honored and very grateful for the nomination" and was "surprised [to be] approached on it", stating, "I assume that my record is good enough as a district court judge to be reached out to, and I'm glad that politics weren't a priority here".

In January 2006, Barry testified to support the appointment of fellow Third Circuit Judge Samuel Alito to the Supreme Court.

In a 2006 ruling, Abou Cham v. Attorney General, Barry was harshly critical of the conduct of a U.S. Immigration Court judge in a case involving a refugee from The Gambia. The refugee petitioner was the nephew of former Gambian president Dawda Jawara, who had been deposed in a coup in 1994; the new regime had imprisoned or killed several of Cham's relatives and outlawed their political party. Barry ruled in favor of Abou Cham; criticized Judge Donald Ferlise's questioning over a two-day hearing as bullying, belligerent, and abusive toward "an increasingly distraught petitioner"; and concluded that Cham had been "ground to bits" emotionally. Barry wrote that there was "not a modicum of courtesy, of respect or of any pretense of fairness" in Ferlise's treatment of Cham, which led Ferlise to conclude that Cham's testimony was not credible, and concluded that the Immigration Court's ruling was a "severe wound" on the American justice system. Ferlise was relieved of his duties shortly after Barry's decision.

In 2009, Barry handled the national security case of Stephen Beightler v. Essex County Prosecutor's Office (3rd Cir. 2009), a pivotal ruling with relation to 11th Amendment sovereign immunity of the states. The case centered around a local prosecutor who accused a defendant of breaching national security before a local court. Stephen Beightler sued, arguing the state waived immunity and it did not apply because the local prosecutor voluntarily entered federal jurisdiction in usurping the United States Department of Justice authority to make such accusations. Barry ruled no such waiver existed in allowing states to engage in such behavior. The case is repeatedly cited in state and federal courts, with one federal court saying the Third Circuit had an opportunity for precedent but failed.

On June 30, 2011, Barry assumed senior status. She took inactive senior status in the first week of February 2017, about two weeks after her brother's inauguration as president.

Barry retired on February 11, 2019. Her retirement ended an investigation of whether she had engaged in fraudulent tax schemes with her siblings that violated judicial conduct rules. The investigation closed without concluding the allegations.

== Allegations of tax evasion ==
In October 2018, The New York Times published an investigative report asserting that Barry, along with her father and siblings, had engaged in fraudulent and illegal activity to limit estate tax and gift tax liability stemming from Fred Trump's real estate enterprises. Investigative journalist Susanne Craig discovered a filing Barry had made to the U.S. Senate as part of her federal judiciary confirmation in 1983, in which she had reported a $1 million contribution from All County Building Supply & Maintenance. The Times reported that All County Building Supply & Maintenance was a "sham company" formed in 1992 and owned by Barry, Donald Trump, their siblings and a cousin.

All County Building Supply & Maintenance reportedly paid for work performed at Fred Trump's apartment buildings; those buildings then reimbursed the company but fraudulently added extra money to those reimbursements. Tax experts reportedly indicated that because All County "performed no real work, the transfer of money through the corporation was essentially a gift that evaded the 55 percent tax in place at the time". Its address was the Manhasset, New York, residence of John Walter, Fred Trump's nephew. (Note: According to the investigation by The Times, John Walter (1934–2018) managed Fred Trump's business records. Those records filled the basement of Walter's Flower Hill, New York residence. The investigation by The Times included thousands of documents such as "bank statements, financial audits, accounting ledgers, cash disbursement reports, invoices and canceled checks" and over 200 of Fred Trump's tax returns.) In a follow-up article, The New York Times reported that the money illicitly earned by All County was split by the Trump siblings.

In October 2018, as a result of the publication of this investigation, the New York State Department of Taxation and Finance began a review of the fraud allegations against Barry and her siblings.

On February 1, 2019, four legal professionals who had filed complaints against Judge Barry in October 2018 stemming from the allegations made in The New York Times were notified by the Court of Appeals for the Second Circuit that an investigation into judicial misconduct by Barry had been launched, regarding her alleged participation in fraudulent tax and financial transactions. Ten days later, Barry, a senior inactive judge, announced her retirement from the bench, effectively ending the investigation.

== Private criticism of Donald Trump ==
Barry made few public statements about her younger brother Donald Trump during his first term as president. She died before he was elected for a second term in 2024. In August 2020, their niece Mary L. Trump revealed that she had surreptitiously audio-recorded 15 hours of discussions with Barry in 2018 and 2019. In those recorded discussions, Barry sharply criticized her brother. Mary publicly released several transcripts and audio excerpts of the conversations, including content that did not previously appear in her 2020 book Too Much and Never Enough.

In the recordings, Barry said of her brother, "All he wants to do is appeal to his base. He has no principles. None. His goddamned tweeting and lying... oh my god. I'm talking too freely, but you know. The change of stories. The lack of preparation. The lying. Holy shit. [...] It's the phoniness of it all. It's the phoniness and this cruelty. Donald is cruel." She added that he did not read books and had someone take the college entrance exam in his place. In the recordings, Barry also criticized the first Trump administration's controversial family separation policy for deported migrants, and the bankruptcies of her brother's businesses, adding that "you can't trust him".

== Personal life and death ==
Barry's first husband was David Desmond; the couple divorced in 1980. In 1982, she married New Jersey lawyer John Joseph Barry. They were married for 18 years before he died on April 9, 2000. She had one son from her first marriage.

Barry converted to Catholicism as an adult and frequently attended Mass. In 2016, she gave $4 million to the Jesuit Fairfield University to fund scholarships and endow the university's center for Ignatian spirituality.

In 2023, Barry was reported to be under hospice care for cancer. On November 13, 2023, she died at her home on Manhattan's Upper East Side, at age 86.

== Awards ==
In 2004, Supreme Court Justice Sandra Day O'Connor presented Barry with an award named for O'Connor that the Seton Hall University School of Law gives to women who excel in law and public service. At the presentation ceremony, Barry said, "I say to the women out there, remember how difficult it was for women like Justice O'Connor starting out", adding, "Even though she graduated with top grades, she had to take a job as a legal secretary. Remember how far we have come".

== Notes ==
Legal offices
Preceded by Henry Curtis Meanor	Judge of the United States District Court for the District of New Jersey; 1983–1999	Succeeded by Joel A. Pisano
Preceded by H. Lee Sarokin	Judge of the United States Court of Appeals for the Third Circuit; 1999–2011	Succeeded by Patty Shwartz
