= John Michael Vazquez =

American judge (born 1970)

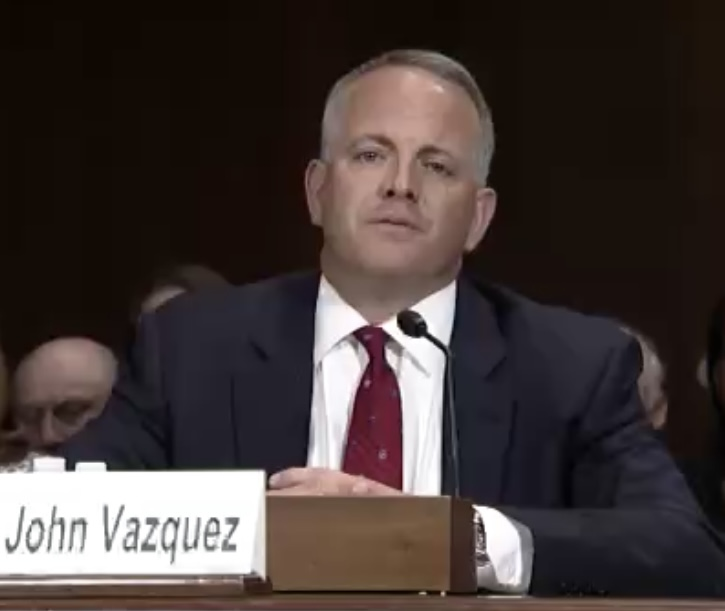

Judge of the United States District Court for the District of New Jersey
- In office January 29, 2016 – September 8, 2023
- Appointed by: Barack Obama
- Preceded by: Joel A. Pisano
- Succeeded by: Jamel K. Semper

Personal details
- Born: May 11, 1970 (age 55) Honolulu, Hawaii, U.S.
- Education: Rutgers University (BA); Seton Hall University (JD)

John Michael Vazquez (born May 11, 1970) is a former United States district judge of the United States District Court for the District of New Jersey.

== Early life and education ==
Vazquez was born in Honolulu, Hawaii, in 1970. His family moved to New Jersey when he was several months old. Vazquez received a Bachelor of Arts degree in 1992 from Rutgers University. He received a Juris Doctor, summa cum laude, in 1996 from Seton Hall University School of Law.

== Career ==
Vazquez served as law clerk to Judge Herman D. Michels of the New Jersey Superior Court, Appellate Division, from 1996 to 1997.

He served as an associate in the Law Offices of Michael Critchley and Associates from 1997 to 2001. From 2001 to 2006, he was an assistant United States attorney in the U.S. Attorney's Office for the District of New Jersey. From 2006 to 2008, he worked in the Office of the New Jersey Attorney General, serving first as special assistant to the Attorney General and subsequently as first assistant attorney general. from 2008 to 2016, he was a partner at Critchley, Kinum & Vazquez, LLC. In that role, Vazquez represented Anthony R. Suarez, mayor of Ridgefield, New Jersey, during his 2010 trial on corruption charges, and won an acquittal, ending "a government streak of more than 200 public corruption convictions spanning more than a decade."

=== Federal judicial service ===
On March 26, 2015, President Barack Obama nominated Vazquez to serve as a United States district judge of the United States District Court for the District of New Jersey, to the seat vacated by Judge Joel A. Pisano, who retired on February 16, 2015. Vasquez was unanimously rated as "well qualified" for the judgeship by the American Bar Association's Standing Committee on the Federal Judiciary, the committee's highest rating. His nomination received the support of both of New Jersey's senators, Cory Booker and Robert Menendez. His nomination was reported from the Senate Judiciary Committee on September 17, 2015, by a voice vote. Vazquez was confirmed by the Senate on January 27, 2016, by a 84–2 vote. He received his judicial commission on January 29, 2016. While on the bench, Vazquez also served as an adjunct professor at Seton Hall University School of Law. He taught Criminal Trial Practice and then Civil Procedure, for which he was named the adjunct professor of the year.

On March 22, 2023, Vazquez gave notice of his intent to resign from office as of September 8, 2023. After the bench, Vazquez joined the firm of Chiesa, Shahinian & Giantomasi as a partner. Vazquez later joined Cooper University Health Care, an academic medical center, as Chief Legal Officer. In 2025, New Jersey Governor Philip Murphy nominated Vazquez to the Rutgers Board of Governors. Vazquez took his seat on the Board in August 2025.

== See also ==
- List of Hispanic and Latino American jurists

Legal offices
Preceded by Joel A. Pisano	Judge of the United States District Court for the District of New Jersey; 2016–2023	Succeeded by Jamel K. Semper
