= Too Much and Never Enough =

2020 biography of Donald J. Trump by Mary L. Trump

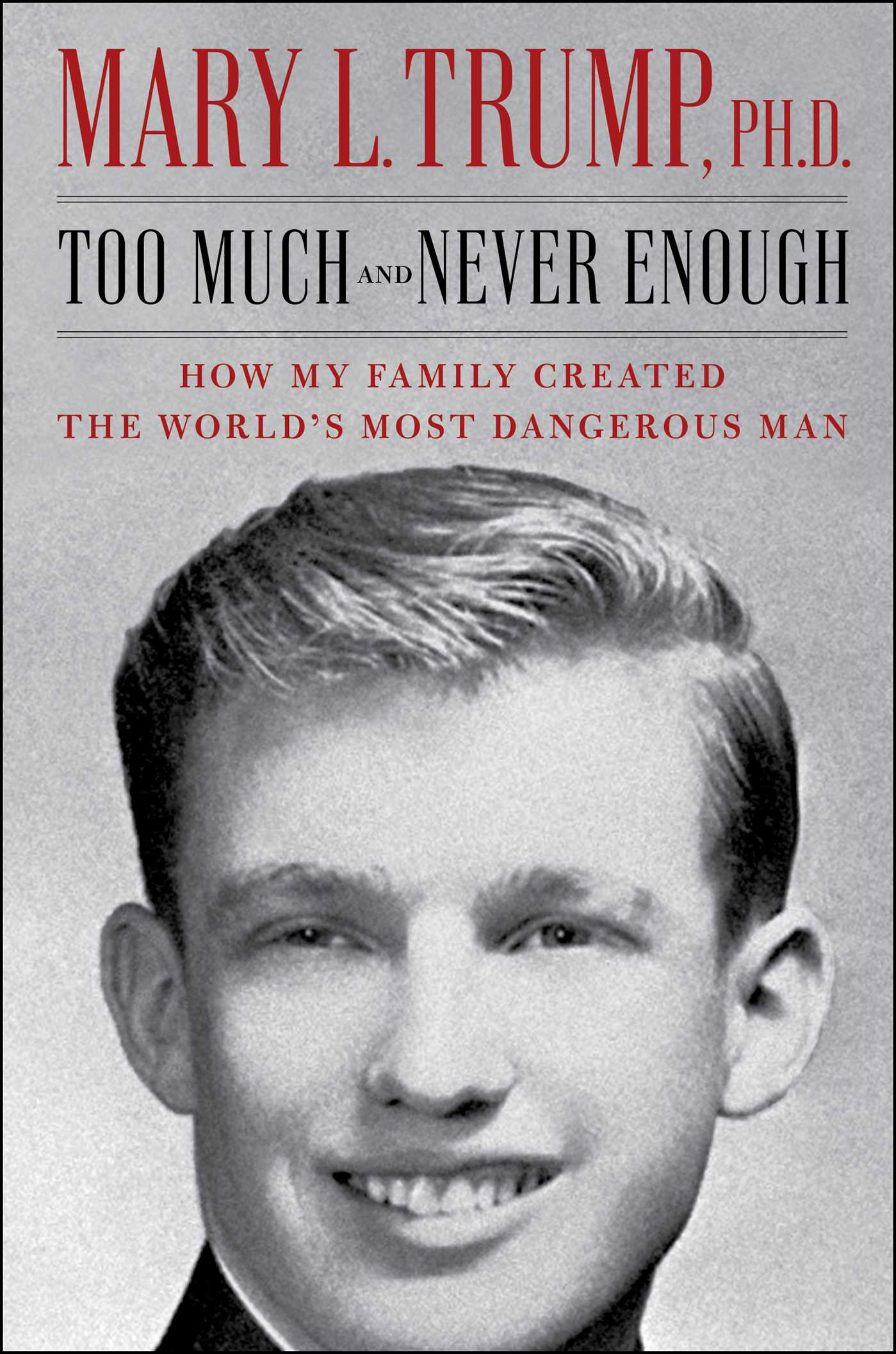
- First edition cover
- Author: Mary L. Trump
- Language: English
- Subject: Donald Trump and his family
- Published: July 14, 2020
- Publisher: Simon & Schuster
- Publication place: United States
- Pages: 240
- ISBN: 978-1982141462 (hardcover)

Too Much and Never Enough: How My Family Created the World's Most Dangerous Man is a tell-all book written by American psychologist Mary L. Trump about her uncle, President Donald Trump, and his family. It was published by Simon & Schuster on July 14, 2020. The book provides an insider view of Trump family dynamics and reveals details about financial dealings, including the author's work as the anonymous source who revealed her uncle's suspected tax fraud. The Trump family launched a lawsuit in an attempt to stop its publication but was unsuccessful in delaying the release of the book.

== Background ==
The book's author, Mary L. Trump, a clinical psychologist, is the daughter of Fred Trump Jr., and a granddaughter of Fred Trump Sr. She has taught graduate students in the subjects of trauma, psychopathology, and developmental psychology. Mary has written a dissertation on stalking victims, conducted research on schizophrenia, and written parts of the prominent medical manual Diagnosis: Schizophrenia. Her father died at age 42 in 1981 from a heart attack induced by alcoholism.

Following the death of Fred Sr. in 1999, Mary and her brother, Fred III, who would also go on to publicly criticize Donald Trump, contested their grandfather's will in probate court, claiming that Fred Sr. was suffering from dementia, and the will was "procured by fraud and undue influence" by Fred Sr.'s other children: Donald, Maryanne, and Robert. A week later, Donald, Maryanne, and Robert terminated health insurance coverage for Fred III's then 18-month-old son, William, who suffered from epileptic spasms caused by cerebral palsy. In an interview with the New York Daily News, Mary said that her "aunt and uncles should be ashamed of themselves. I'm sure they are not." The suit was settled, with William's health insurance reinstated. Donald in 2016 explained his actions: "I was angry because they sued."

After her uncle's presidential campaign, Mary Trump came into contact with The New York Times, and provided boxes of tax documents from the Trump family as an anonymous source. The documents were used for a 2018 article by David Barstow, Susanne Craig, and Russ Buettner that detailed financial fraud by Trump, for which the authors won the Pulitzer Prize for Explanatory Reporting.

Barstow pursued Mary Trump with an offer to ghostwrite a book for her. He introduced her to Andrew Wylie, his agent, who offered her a multi-million dollar advance for her participation. Craig and Buettner were angry when they found out about this, and the editors of the Times forbade Barstow from writing the book, as they felt that his involvement would breach the Times' ethical guidelines. Mary Trump ended up working with Jay Mandel of WME, and sold her book's publishing rights to Simon & Schuster in an auction.

== Synopsis ==
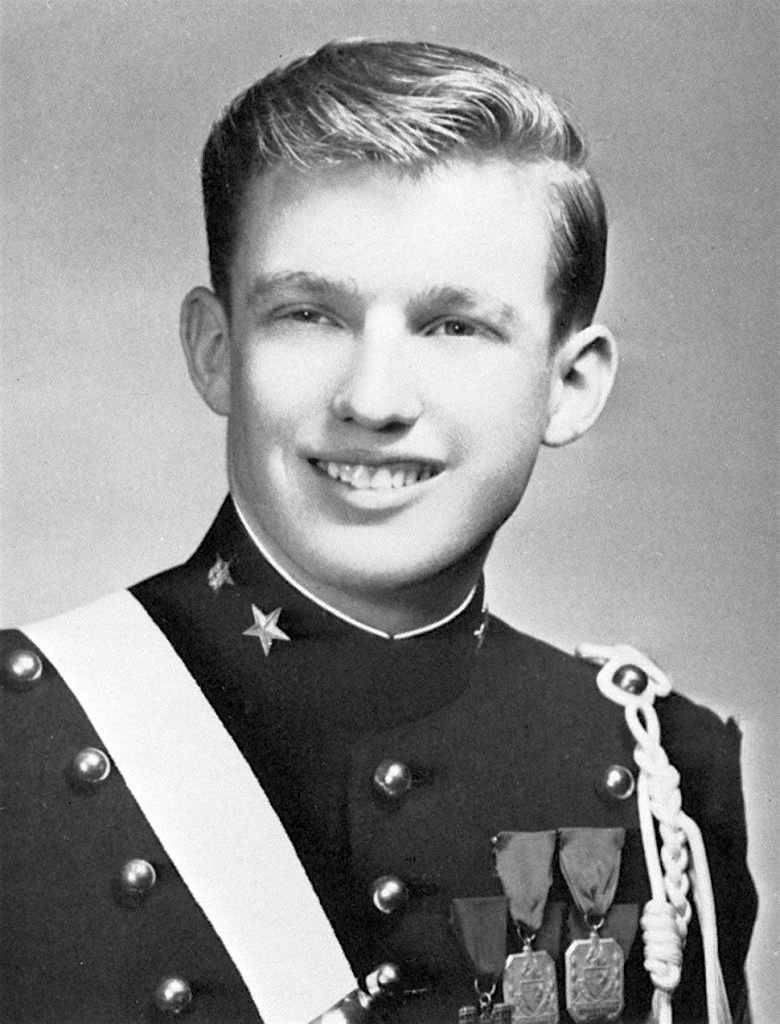
A black-and-white photograph of Donald Trump at the New York Military Academy in 1964. This image was used for the cover of the book.

The book takes the form of a chronological biography; while Donald Trump is the stated focal point, Mary Trump devotes significant attention to other members of the Trump family as a way to shed light on their mutual dynamics and financial dealings. Drawing on her skills as a clinical psychologist from the Derner Institute of Advanced Psychological Studies at Adelphi University in New York, the author attempts to provide the inner familial workings as a background from which to analyze Donald, but has avoided outright diagnosis.

In Part One: The Cruelty Is the Point, the author describes the character of the family's patriarch, Fred Trump Sr., and attempts to elucidate how his treatment of his children has had a lasting impact on them. Based on recollections from family members, Mary diagnoses Fred Sr. as a "high-functioning sociopath" who sought to use and abuse all those around him for his own benefit. Donald, while observing his brother Fred Jr. being constantly criticized by their father, would adopt Fred Sr.'s attitude and behavior to avoid displays of sadness, weakness, or kindness. Mary states Fred's cruel influence ensured that Donald would have limited access to his range of emotions. Their mother, Mary, is described as a "physically and mentally challenged" subservient wife during the children's formative years as a result of osteoporosis and due to Fred's frequent verbal abuse of her and their children. Later in life, she would reveal to Mary that she was relieved when Donald was sent away to a military school at age 13, as at that point he had started to become belligerent and disobedient towards her.

In Part Two: The Wrong Side of the Tracks, the author chronicles Donald's early career. She observes that, since Fred Sr. never achieved the fame he considered deserving of his business acumen, he was happy to allow Donald to play the public face of the Trump Organization while he took care of the actual work by leaning heavily on political and other business connections. Meanwhile, Fred Jr. saw that, after Fred Sr. unfairly blamed him for the collapse of large housing projects, he began sidelining his eldest son in favor of Donald, and thus chose to leave the family business to pursue a career as a commercial pilot. The entire Trump family's constant denigration of Fred Jr.'s chosen profession contributed to his struggles with alcoholism and other issues in the 1970s, leading to both his aviation career and marriage failing. Fred Trump Jr. eventually died in 1981 at age 42 due to a heart attack in a hospital away from family, while his parents waited at home for the hospital to phone them of Fred Jr.'s death, and his brother Donald was watching a film at a local movie theater.

In Part Three: Smoke and Mirrors, the author details how, as the influence of Fred Sr. waned, Donald Trump struggled to operate his business without the knowledge and connections his father provided. Mary describes Donald as an inept businessman who could keep up appearances only due to his associates' unwillingness to tear down the façade, as they saw his notoriety as an asset. At one point Donald had to negotiate with his creditors for a monthly allowance of $450,000. Mary also focuses on how the family turned on her after Fred Sr.'s death in 1999, including cutting off her and her brother's health insurance, resulting in precarious conditions for her brother's child William. Mary decided to settle by allowing the rest of the family to buy out her partnership of a family corporation (in exchange for reinstating William's health insurance) at what she now understands to be a significant undervaluation. She eventually learned the true value of her family's wealth by acting as an anonymous source in the Pulitzer Prize-winning New York Times investigation.

In Part Four: The Worst Investment Ever Made, the author provides her view of the period when Donald Trump mounted a successful campaign to become President of the United States. Mary again draws on her training as a psychologist to claim that her grandfather Fred Sr. initiated a direct line to more power actors, all enabling Donald's worst instincts to serve their respective needs. She states that, due to her uncle's psychological capacity being forcefully stopped from fully developing at a young age by his father, he remains extremely susceptible to manipulation by more capable local and foreign actors.

== Allegations ==
The book reportedly covers how Mary provided The New York Times with confidential tax documents from the Trump family, resulting in the Times alleging that Donald engaged in fraud, as well as reporting that Donald transferred approximately $413 million from his father's real estate businesses to aid his own struggling businesses during the 1990s. The book also accuses Donald of paying a friend, Joe Shapiro, to take the SAT for him. Mary says in the book that Donald and Fred Sr. neglected her father and contributed to his death from alcoholism, and that Donald later disparaged and disregarded Fred Sr. when the latter developed Alzheimer's disease.

=== Release of tape recordings ===
On August 22, 2020, Mary released tape recordings of her conversations with her aunt Maryanne Trump Barry, Donald's sister and a former United States federal judge appointed to judicial offices by Presidents Ronald Reagan and Bill Clinton. Barry's statements in the recordings substantiate many of the claims made in Mary's book. Mary's reason for recording the conversations was to collect evidence that the settlement of her inheritance from her grandfather was based on a severely understated total worth. In the recordings, Barry expresses horror at Donald's immigration policy of separating children from their parents, disparages his religious supporters for their lack of compassion, and laments his cruelty and phoniness. The recordings reveal that Barry was the source of Mary's claim that Donald paid a friend to take the college entrance exam for him.

== Promotion ==
The book received both national and international attention, with Trump making numerous media appearances, including: The Rachel Maddow Show, The Beat with Ari Melber, This Week with George Stephanopoulos, The View, Frontline, Cuomo Prime Time, Democracy Now!, The Late Show with Stephen Colbert, Canada's CTV News, 60 Minutes Australia, UK's Channel 4 News and Sky News, The Late Late Show on RTÉ One in Ireland and Scandinavia's Skavlan talk show.

== Release ==
Simon & Schuster initially set a release date of August 11, 2020, and gave the exclusive report about it to The Daily Beast, which published an article about the book on June 15. Two days later, the book reached No. 5 on Amazon's bestseller list. The response to the article led them to move the publication date up to July 28. On July 6, Simon & Schuster announced that they had moved the publication date to July 14 as a result of "high demand and extraordinary interest", which had led it to surpass The Room Where It Happened as the No. 1 bestseller on Amazon. On July 17, 2020, Simon & Schuster announced that the book had sold more than 950,000 copies in pre-orders by its publication date, a new record for the publisher. In its first week, Too Much and Never Enough sold 1.35 million copies.

=== Legal efforts to stop publication ===
Donald Trump, according to The Daily Beast, discussed the possibility of taking legal action against Mary. He told Axios that Mary had previously signed a "very powerful" non-disclosure agreement (NDA) that "covers everything", and so according to him, she was "not allowed to write a book".

Robert Trump filed suit on June 23, attempting to secure a preliminary injunction and a temporary restraining order to block publication, citing Mary's NDA. In a hearing on June 25, Judge Peter J. Kelly of the Queens County Surrogate Court in New York City dismissed the case over lack of jurisdiction. Robert took his case to a general trial court, the New York Supreme Court in Dutchess County, where on June 30, Justice Hal B. Greenwald ordered a temporary stay of the release of the book, while setting a hearing for July 10 to decide whether the book should be permanently blocked from publication. A New York appellate justice, Alan D. Scheinkman, on July 1, reversed the lower court's decision, finding that Simon & Schuster was not a party to the NDA, was not subject to prior restraint and pre-publication injunction considering the First Amendment, ruling that Simon & Schuster could proceed to publish the book pending a hearing on July 10, leaving Mary enjoined from book sale activities, and leaving open the question of whether Mary had violated the NDA. On July 2, 2020, Mary filed a sworn affidavit alleging she was not bound by the NDA clause in the settlement agreement for numerous reasons, including that the asset "valuations...in...the Settlement Agreement...were fraudulent."

On July 13, Greenwald issued a ruling affirming Simon & Schuster's right to continue to publish the book, and finding Mary, under her contract with Simon & Schuster, could not halt publication, that it would have been “moot” to order her to stop publication of a book that "has been published and distributed in great quantities" already. The justice also suggested the case was additionally weak because Robert brought it, while the book focused largely on his brother Donald, the president. Robert could have still attempted to seek monetary damages from Mary, but as of the ruling date it was uncertain if he intended to do so. Robert died one month later, on August 15.

== Reception ==
The book received generally positive reviews. Critics praised Mary Trump for drawing on both her background in clinical psychology and knowledge of familial history to produce a standout work in the Trump tell-all genre. Jennifer Szalai of The New York Times praises the author's courage and determination, describing the book as "written from pain and is designed to hurt," the latter part of the characterization Mary later rejects.

This is a book that's been written from pain and is designed to hurt. ... Forget the psychologist's vocabulary of childhood attachment and personality disorders; it's when Mary talks about her need "to take Donald down" that she starts speaking the only language her family truly understands.

— Jennifer Szalai, The New York Times, July 2020

The Los Angeles Times contrasts the book with other work on Trump's presidency, saying that the empathetic manner with which the author approached the subject makes for a unique take. Megan Garber, writing for The Atlantic, agreed with Mary's observation that Donald Trump has allowed for similarly toxic family dynamics to be brought to the national stage. David Aaronovitch of The Times notes the book is in large part a biography of Fred Trump Sr., and believes that by shaping Donald definitively, the old patriarch's presence in some way looms large over modern political history. Chris Taylor of Mashable is more critical, suggesting that the author makes sweeping claims while sometimes contradicting herself.
