= Boulos =

- Pronunciation: Arabic: [buːlus] Egyptian Arabic: [buːlos]
- Gender: Male
- Language: Arabic

Origin
- Meaning: Paul
- Region of origin: Levant

Other names
- Alternative spelling: Bulus, Bolos
- Variant form: Paul

Boulos (Arabic: بولس or بولص), also transliterated Boulus, Boolos, Bulos, Bulus etc., is the Arabic form of the name Paul. It can be used as a male given name, or as a surname. It is most common in the Levant as well as in Iraq among Assyrians.

== Given name ==
- Boulos Shehadeh (1882–1943), Palestinian journalist and politician
- Bulus Farah (c. 1910—1991), Palestinian trade unionist
- Paulos Faraj Rahho (1942–2008) Chaldean Catholic Archeparch of Mosul, Iraq

== Surname ==
- Bahnam Zaya Bulos (born 1944), Iraqi Assyrian Christian politician
- Christophe Boulos (born 1996), Lebanese track and field sprinter
- Fares Boulos, American musician and actor
- George Boolos (1940–1996), American philosopher and mathematical logician
- Guilherme Boulos (born 1982), Brazilian political and social activist, professor and writer
- Issa Boulos (born 1968), Palestinian-American musician
- Jimmy Bulus (born 1986), Nigerien footballer
- John Boulos (1921–2002), Haitian-American football (soccer) player
- Kimberly Boulos (born 1987), Haitian soccer player
- Maged N. Kamel Boulos, British health informatician
- Michael Boulos (born 1997), Lebanese-American business executive, son of Massad Boulos and husband of Tiffany Trump
- Michel Boulos (born 1976), Canadian sabre fencer
- Michelle Boulos (born 1988), American figure skater
- Mikaella Boulos (born 1992), Lebanese actress and architect
- Philippe Najib Boulos (1902–1979), Lebanese lawyer and politician
- Reginald Boulos (born 1956), third generation Lebanese-Haitian medical doctor and businessman
- Sargon Boulus (1944–2007), Iraqi Assyrian poet and short story writer

== Company ==
- Boulos Enterprises, a Nigerian motorcycle company who Michael Boulos is the heir of
