= Donald Trump's Gaza Strip proposal =

Donald Trump's Gaza Strip proposal may refer to:

- 2020 Israel–Palestine peace plan
- 2025 Donald Trump Gaza Strip takeover proposal
- Gaza peace plan
