= Trump peace plan =

Trump peace plan or Trump's peace plan may refer to:

- 2020 Trump Israel–Palestine plan, the first Donald Trump administration's plan to resolve the Israeli–Palestinian conflict
- "Trump peace plan" as a phrase used for the 2025 proposal of the second Donald Trump administration concerning the Russo-Ukrainian War
- Gaza war peace plan, the 2025 Donald Trump administration's plan to resolve the Israeli–Palestinian conflict

== See also ==
- Trump Gaza plan
