= Massad Boulos =

Lebanese-born American diplomat (born 1971)

- مسعد بولس
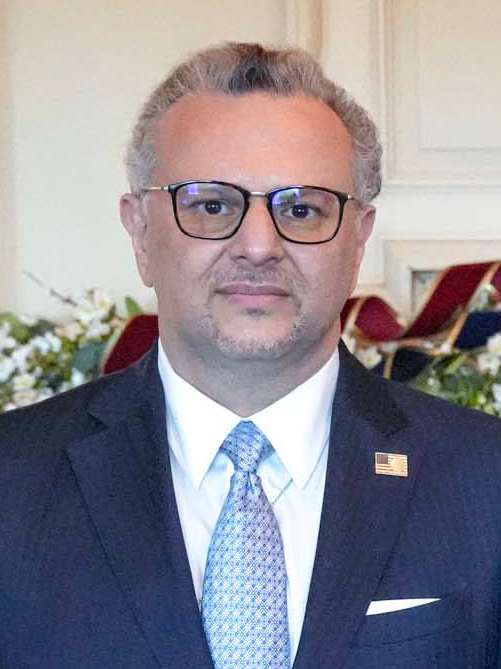
- Boulos in 2026

U.S. Senior Advisor for Arab and African Affairs
- Incumbent
- Assumed office January 20, 2025
- President: Donald Trump
- Preceded by: Position established

Senior Advisor for Africa (Department of State)
- Incumbent
- Assumed office April 1, 2025
- President: Donald Trump
- Secretary of State: Marco Rubio

Personal details
- Born: Massad Fares Boulos; 1971 (age 54–55) Batroun District, Lebanon
- Citizenship: Lebanon; Nigeria; France; United States
- Party: Republican
- Spouse: Sarah Fadoul Boulos
- Children: 4, including Michael and Fares
- Relatives: Tiffany Trump (daughter-in-law)
- Education: University of Houston–Downtown (BBA); Texas Southern University (JD)

Massad Fares Boulos (Arabic: مسعد فارس بولس; born 1971) is a Lebanese-born American and Nigerian businessman and diplomat. He serves as a Senior Advisor to the President of the United States on Arab and Middle Eastern Affairs and concurrently as Senior Advisor for Africa at the U.S. Department of State in President Trump's second administration.

He is the father of Michael Boulos, who is married to Trump's daughter Tiffany. He campaigned for Trump's successful presidential campaign in the 2024 presidential election in Arab American communities, particularly in Michigan.

Boulos runs a small trucking company in Nigeria. He rose to prominence in 2018 when his son began to date Tiffany Trump. In December 2024, President-elect Donald Trump designated Boulos as his Middle East adviser.

== Early life ==
Boulos was born in Batroun, Lebanon, to Lebanese Christian parents Fares and Marie-Therese. He is the eldest of four siblings, Vivian, Philip and Michel. His father Fares Boulos served as mayor of Kfaraakka from 1998 to 2010. They are Lebanese Greek Orthodox Christian (Boulos' surname means Paul in Arabic).

He moved to Texas as a teenager. He graduated in 1993 from the University of Houston–Downtown with a Bachelor of Business Administration degree. He also holds a Juris Doctor degree from the Thurgood Marshall School of Law at Texas Southern University. While he was described by President Donald Trump as "an accomplished lawyer," public records show that although he applied to take the Texas bar exam in 1996, he does not appear to be a licensed attorney in Texas.

== Career ==
=== In business ===
After completing his education, Boulos moved to Nigeria and became the CEO of SCOA Nigeria PLC. SCOA is a heavy truck assembly and heavy machinery dealership company that operates as part of the Fadoul Group, a business conglomerate based in West Africa.

Following Trump's announcement that he would appoint Boulos as a presidential advisor (see § US politics), he was subject to scrutiny by some media outlets regarding his business record and public profile.

Media outlets initially described SCOA as a "multi-billion dollar conglomerate". A New York Times article asserted discrepancies between this description and its documented business background. As reported by the New York Times, the company' shares trade for about two Nigerian naira, roughly a tenth of a US cent, a penny stock with a market capitalization worth about $865,000 as of 2024. Boulos holds a minority share of $1.53 according to the company's latest annual report. When asked to confirm the multibillion-dollar valuation of his company, he said that describing it as "multibillion dollar" company was accurate, that "it's a big company" and that he referred to the Fadoul Group's companies, collectively worth more than $1 billion. He further added that "I've never gone into any details like that about the value".

Several reports misidentified Boulos as the owner of Boulos Enterprises owned by another family of the same name. He confirmed to the NYT that he had no relationship with Boulos Enterprises, and that he did not correct public reports because he made a practice of not commenting on his businesses.

Following media scrutiny of Boulos' business track record, the Trump-Vance transition team and Boulos himself rebuked the accusations, with spokesperson Karoline Leavitt calling the stories "fake news". The Transition Team issued a statement answering to the article published by the Business Insider declaring that: "The truth is Mr. Boulos is a highly respected businessman who has proudly served as the CEO of some of his family's group of companies based in West Africa for more than 27 years and his family has employed tens of thousands of people around the globe". Several Nigerian media outlets published an op-ed penned by Magnus Onyibe, credited as a non-executive independent director at SCOA, echoing Leavitt's press release and describing the company's achievements in Nigeria and West Africa.

=== Lebanese politics ===
Both his father and grandfather were known figures in Lebanese politics, as his great uncle, Massad, served in Parliament and his father, Fares, served as Mayor of Kfarkaara. Boulos is acquainted with Christian politicians and parties in Lebanon from Suleiman Frangieh of the Marada Movement, considered aligned with Hezbollah, to the Free Patriotic Movement (FPM) and anti-Hezbollah opposition parties like the Lebanese Forces. However, he has mentioned in interviews that he is not affiliated with any party in Lebanon and that he is acquainted with most Lebanese Christian leaders. In a September 2025 interview with Al Jazeera, he stated that Hezbollah and all armed organizations in Lebanon should be fully disarmed.

According to Century Foundation's analyst Aron Lund, quoting a report in As-Safir, Boulos was a supporter of Michel Aoun's Free Patriotic Movement and represented it in Nigeria, where his father-in-law did business and funded the party's activities. When asked about his relation with the FPM, which elected Michel Aoun as president with support from Hezbollah, Boulos said that "as Lebanese Christians, most of us supported President Aoun's calls for Lebanese sovereignty from the late 1980's to the early 2000's (including the United States Congress and administrations); in fact in 2005, he enjoyed the support of close to 80% of Lebanese Christians as well as Muslims." In October 2024, the Free Patriotic Movement declared they were no longer bound by their previous alliance.

AP reported that Boulos initially stood for parliament in Koura, but withdrew for another list involving the FPM, Marada and the communists. In 2009, the FPM shortlisted him, but Aoun eventually chose another candidate. By 2018, he again pledged his support to Marada. He subsequently denied ever running for Parliament.

Lund writes that Boulos' career "does not exactly indicate a firm commitment to either side in Lebanese or regional politics", and that his appointment suggests that Trump's Middle East policy "will often be more readily understood in light of the personalities orbiting Mar-a-Lago [a Trump-owned resort] than through an ideological prism or in terms of U.S. national interest." He also mentioned that Boulos' connections could be highly useful "if Trump were to lean the other way and pursue his isolationist instincts, aiming to deescalate ongoing wars, deconflict with Iran, and scale down the U.S. presence in the region." Analyst Mitchell Plitnick saw Boulos as "a businessman and political opportunist" but that his nomination signaled the administration's willingness to engage with the Palestinians.

=== US politics ===
Boulos has been involved in Republican politics for decades, and worked as a volunteer during George W. Bush's 1994 campaign for governor of Texas. During the 2024 US presidential elections, Boulos campaigned for Trump in Muslim and Arab communities with Bishara Bahbah, who founded Arabs for Trump, and Richard Grenell. He sought to portray Trump as supportive of "global peace", according to Bahbah. In an interview with The Times, he said that "There are 3.5 million Arab Americans, which is a huge number, and they just want their voices to be heard. And Trump has been listening". Despite that, there was criticism over his outreach during some meetings, as some attendees criticized Trump's policies regarding Jerusalem.

Yassin K. Fawaz, a political analyst, credits Boulos as bridging "the gap between Trump's campaign and these communities, ensuring that their concerns were not only heard but acted upon".

=== Diplomacy and peace initiatives ===
Boulos has been involved in several international diplomatic efforts, particularly during the Trump administration, focusing on conflict resolution in Africa and the Middle East. In an interview, Boulos summarized the administration's Africa policy as based on "peace, partnerships and prosperity," shifting focus from aid to trade and stating that while democracy is appreciated, the U.S. policy is "not to interfere in the internal affairs of other countries."

In North Africa, Boulos helped spearhead a diplomatic initiative to build global support for Morocco's autonomy plan for Western Sahara. This effort culminated in a United Nations General Assembly vote in September 2025, which saw a majority of member states vote in favor of the plan, marking a significant shift in the international approach to the long-standing dispute. The plan had been officially endorsed by President Donald Trump earlier that year.

Following the 2024 U.S. presidential election, Boulos was a key architect behind the Washington Accord of 2025, a peace agreement between the Democratic Republic of the Congo (DRC) and Rwanda aimed at de-escalating tensions in the Great Lakes region. Analysts described his role as pivotal in driving the negotiations to a successful conclusion.

Boulos has also been involved in addressing the conflict in Sudan. As the conflict falls within his diplomatic remit, he has participated in the development of a proposed three-part peace plan developed in coordination with the Quad (United States, United Arab Emirates, Saudi Arabia, and Egypt), aiming to broker a ceasefire and initiate a sustainable political process.

Additionally, Boulos has been involved with the U.S.-backed Lobito Corridor, a railway and port project linking the Democratic Republic of the Congo and Zambia to Angola's Atlantic coast. The administration has expressed support for the initiative, which has been described as part of broader U.S. efforts to promote investment-led infrastructure projects in Africa alongside alternatives to Chinese and Russian-backed developments.

=== Role as Senior Advisor ===
Boulos was named a senior advisor to Donald Trump in 2025. In this role, Boulos has acted as an intermediary between the Palestinian Authority and its leader, Mahmoud Abbas and Trump.

Boulos was involved in the 2024 Israel-Lebanon ceasefire agreement. While he initially said that the Lebanese Army was fulfilling his duty in "an acceptable manner" regarding its role in the ceasefire, he subsequently explained during an interview for Le Point that "there was an initial misunderstanding, particularly in Lebanon, where it was believed that the ceasefire agreement applied only to the area south of the Litani River". He further clarified his position and reaffirmed the requirement that Hezbollah should disarm applies to the whole of Lebanon, not just areas south of the Litani river.

The New Arab quotes Boulos as saying that "the text is very clear in implementing United Nations resolutions, whether Resolution 1701 or 1559". In an interview with MTV News, he asserted that the question of Iranian funding for armed groups, including Hezbollah, was an integral part of the ceasefire agreement.

During negotiations for the current Lebanese government, Boulos was responsible for conveying the message that Hezbollah-allied Amal Movement, should play a less prominent role in the new government.

In a meeting with Yossi Dagan, head of the Samaria Regional Council and activist settler, Boulos said that "in Israel, in Lebanon, and throughout the region, we want and hope for peace, and with God's grace, we will achieve it soon”. His meeting and declarations were criticized by Palestinian advocates as promoting the "normalization" of the Israeli occupation of the West Bank. He also attended an Iftar dinner hosted by the Israeli Ambassador to the U.S. Yechiel Leiter. An article published by The Times of Israel noted the absence of representatives from countries that signed the Abraham Accords, as a result of the cool down in public ties between Israel and the signatory countries caused by the 2023 Gaza War.

In March 2025, Semafor reported that Massad Boulos would be appointed Special Envoy for the Democratic Republic of the Congo and the Great Lakes Region, reportedly due to American interest in securing a minerals deal. Despite the lack of official confirmation, the move was praised by Kenyan President William Ruto, who said that the nomination showed a commitment to peace and stability in Africa.

He was later confirmed as Senior Advisor for Africa, making him the State Department's most senior official to work in the continent. His appointment came after the White House failed three times to fill the position. His appointment was described as part of a pivot in American foreign policy, boosting relations with Africa to curb growing Chinese and Russian influence.

His first diplomatic tour saw him travelling to DRC Congo, Rwanda, Kenya and Uganda, accompanied by Deputy Assistant Secretary of State for African Affairs, Corina Sanders. Boulos subsequently announced that President Felix Tshisekedi agreed upon a path forward to develop a minerals agreement, allowing private U.S. firms to work in the country and that the United States would use "all diplomatic and economic tools" to advance peace in the region. Three Americans who were imprisoned due to their participation in a failed coup attempt were granted presidential clemency and transferred to fulfill their sentences in the United States, in what was described as a gesture of diplomatic goodwill.

Boulos also discussed peace efforts with President Paul Kagame, reiterating the American position that Rwanda should withdraw all troops from Congo and to cease all military support for M23 rebels. Rwandan authorities deny supporting the M23. After a Qatar-brokered truce between the DRC and M23, Boulos and Secretary of State Marco Rubio hosted the Congolese and Rwandan foreign ministers in Washington D.C., where they agreed to a "declaration of principles" for ending the war.

He informally met President Bola Tinubu in Paris, and reportedly discussed bilateral relations and investments in Nigeria.

As part of his portfolio, he also announced a proposal to solve the Libyan crisis based on bringing all factions to the negotiation table to end the country's political paralysis. Some questioned if the plan would come to fruition considering previous cuts in the U.S. Department of State's budget and the impact of increased tariffs on Libya–U.S. bilateral trade. Amid reports of the U.S. government planning to relocate Palestinians from the Gaza Strip to Libya, Boulos met Egypt's intelligence chief, Major Hassan Rashad and President Abdel Fattah El-Sisi to discuss the ongoing unrest and deterioration of the humanitary situation in Libya. According to a report on Al-Araby, the United States is pursuing a policy that includes Egypt as a regional partner in achieving stability in Africa, particularly regarding Libya and Sudan.

== Personal life ==
Boulos holds Lebanese, Nigerian, French and American citizenships.

He married Sarah Fadoul Boulos, who was born in Burkina Faso. Circa 1986, she lived in Houston, Texas, and graduated in biology at Houston Baptist University in 1994. In 1996, the couple moved to Lagos, Nigeria and Sarah worked at SCOA Nigeria as the Director of Trading and Logistics.

She is a philanthropist, entrepreneur and dance coach who in 2005 founded the Society for the Performing Arts in Nigeria (SPAN) in a small studio in her garage, gradually increasing its profile in Nigerian society. Sarah mentions that SPAN has reached more than 10,000 youth since its inception. More recently, she has been a franchisee of Creative Education International (CrEd) Lagos Island. As of 2020 she worked overseeing the imports of her business, La Pointe Delicatessen in Victoria Island, Lagos.

Sarah and Massad are devout Christians. Together they have four children, Michael, Fares, Oriane and Sophie. In 2022, their son Michael married Tiffany Trump, daughter of Donald Trump. Fares is an actor who played a brief non-speaking role in The Crown.

== See also ==
- Boulos Enterprises
