= Bishara Bahbah =

Palestinian-American academic, businessman, and activist

- بشارة بحبح
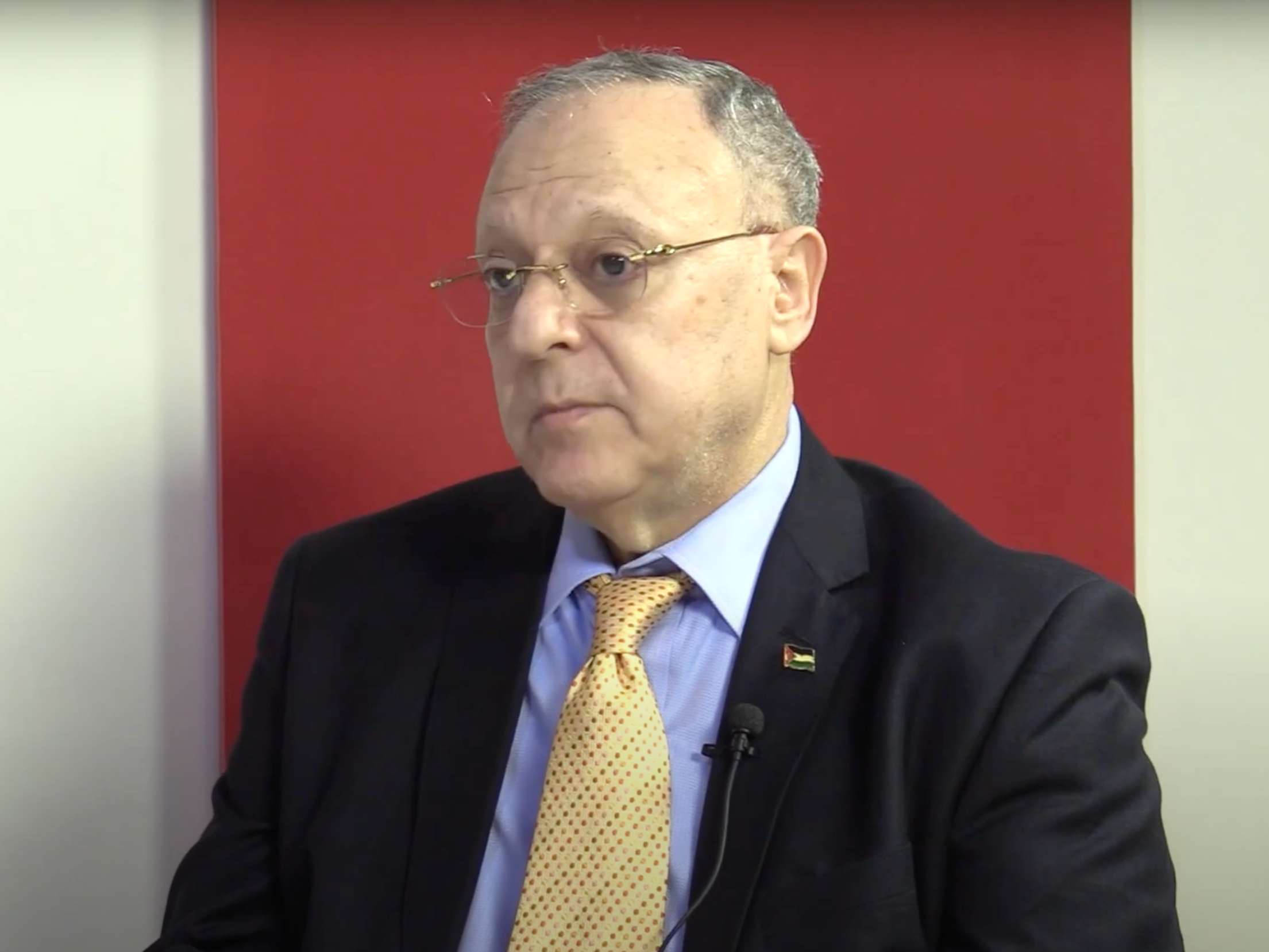
- Bahbah in 2024
- Born: Bishara Assad Rizek Issa Bahbah; 1958 (age 67–68); Jerusalem
- Citizenship: United States
- Education: Brigham Young University (BA); Harvard University (MA, PhD)
- Organization: Arab Americans for Trump
- Political party: Republican

Bishara Bahbah (بشارة بحبح; born 1958 in Jerusalem) is a Palestinian-American academic, businessman, and political activist. He has taught at universities including Brigham Young University, Harvard Kennedy School, Al-Quds University, and Bethlehem University. He has directed Palestinian advocacy, educational, and charitable organizations including United Palestinian Appeal, the National Association of Arab Americans, and the Center for Policy Analysis on Palestine. In the 1990s, Bahbah served as an adviser to Yasser Arafat, and was a Palestinian delegate in peace talks with Israel. In 2024, he established Arab Americans for Trump, which later rebranded to Arab Americans for Peace in February 2025. He also helped facilitate negotiations between Hamas and the Trump administration in 2025.

== Early life and education ==
Bishara Assad Rizek Issa Bahbah was born in 1958 in Jerusalem's Old City. His father was a barber. In 1948, prior to his birth, his family had fled the Nakba to the Zarqa Camp in Jordan, where they lived for two years before returning to the Old City. According to Bahbah, his family fled Jerusalem shortly after the King David Hotel bombing, which his father narrowly survived by jumping from the second story window of his barbershop within the hotel.

Bahbah completed his secondary education in Jerusalem before departing in 1976 for the United States on a scholarship to Brigham Young University in Utah, where he studied international relations. He later enrolled at Harvard University, earning a master's degree and PhD in political science.

== Career ==
Bahbah returned to Jerusalem in 1983 and served until 1984 as editor-in-chief of the Arabic and English editions of Al-Fajr, a newspaper published in East Jerusalem from 1972 to 1993 that was broadly aligned with the Palestine Liberation Organization.

Bahbah later moved back to the United States, working as a visiting associate professor and then adjunct professor of political science at Brigham Young University beginning in 1985. In collaboration with Lina Butler, in 1986 he co-authored Israel and Latin America: The Military Connection, which analyzes the background and dynamics of military cooperation between Israel and several Latin American countries.

In 1995, Bahbah taught public policy at Harvard University's Kennedy School, and served as associate director of the university's Institute for Social and Economic Policy in the Middle East.

Bahbah was an adjunct professor of investment, finance, and wealth management at Al-Quds and Bethlehem Universities. Bahbah has also worked in financial services, including for a Morgan Stanley subsidiary and as a financial adviser in Scottsdale, Arizona. In 2009, he published a book for affluent investors titled Wealth Management in Any Market.

Since 2000, Bahbah has been a regular guest columnist for The Arizona Republic.

=== Charitable and advocacy organizations ===
Bahbah was the executive director of the United Palestinian Appeal charitable organization in the mid-1980s. Bahbah left UPA to become president and CEO of the National Association of Arab Americans in 1988. In 1990, Bahbah served as a Senior Fellow at the newly founded Center for Policy Analysis on Palestine (later renamed the Palestine Center), later becoming its director. Bahbah has also served on the board of the American-Arab Anti-Discrimination Committee.

== Political career ==
In the 1990s, Bahbah was an adviser to Yasser Arafat, with whom he became close after meeting in Cairo in 1986. He also served as a delegate for Palestine in peace talks with Israel.

In 2024, Bahbah established the organization Arab Americans for Trump. He said that, although he had voted for Joe Biden in the 2020 United States presidential election, he began to believe after the October 7 attacks that Democrats would not put an end to the killing of Palestinians. He and Massad Boulos, the father-in-law of Trump's daughter Tiffany Trump and later Senior Advisor to the President, collaborated during Trump's 2024 presidential campaign to push Trump to resist Israeli efforts to increase US support for the Gaza war. During Trump's campaign, Bahbah stated that he believed Trump would "put an immediate end to the war in Gaza" if elected. Shortly after the election, Bahbah stated that he believed Trump "is a different person than he was in 2016 and 2020 ... He now wants an end to the war and a lasting peace in the Middle East."

In May 2024, Bahbah and Boulos helped to establish a political action committee called Arab Americans for a Better America. The PAC raised $478,300 in the 2024 election cycle.

In February 2025, Bahbah renamed Arab Americans for Trump to Arab Americans for Peace after Trump commented that he wished to develop Gaza into the "Riviera of the Middle East".

At several points in 2025, Bahbah served as a messenger between Hamas and the United States government, including in conversations aimed at negotiating a ceasefire in the Gaza war and the return of hostage Edan Alexander. Bahbah does not have an official role in the Trump administration, but has been described as an envoy to Steve Witkoff, who was appointed by Trump to be his Special Envoy to the Middle East. Bahbah told The Telegraph he was "as mystified as anyone else" at becoming a conduit for the communications between Hamas and the Trump administration. The Telegraph described Bahbah as a "novice professor" and a "political neophyte ... rocketed to power by his embrace of Donald Trump". A senior US official speaking anonymously to Axios described Bahbah as "involved but tangentially" in the communications.

== Personal life ==
Bahbah lives in Arizona. He is Christian.

Bahbah described himself as a Republican in his writings in The Arizona Republic in the 2000s. However, in reporting about his creation of Arab Americans for Trump, NDTV described him as a Democrat who "publicly broke with the party in 2024"; Ynet wrote that he was a "loyal Democratic voter who never considered backing the Republican Party — until October 7".
