= Oyibo Rebel =

American musician and actor

- Born: Fares Boulos; Houston, Texas, United States
- Father: Massad Boulos
- Relatives: Michael Boulos (brother)
- Musical career
- Also known as: Farastafarian
- Origin: Lagos, Nigeria
- Genres: Afrobeats; Yoruba; rap
- Instrument: vocals
- Years active: 2012–present

Fares Boulos, known professionally as Oyibo Rebel, is an American musician and actor based in Lagos, Nigeria. He has released music blending Afrobeats and rap with Yoruba influences. He is the brother of Michael Boulos.

== Early life ==
Fares Boulos was born in Houston, Texas. His Lebanese father, Massad Boulos, is a business executive active in Nigeria, while his Burkina-faso born Lebanese mother, Sarah Boulos, founded the Society for the Performing Arts in Nigeria (SPAN). At the age of five, Boulos moved with his family to Lagos, Nigeria, where he attended the French school, Ecole Française Louis PASTEUR and later transferred to the American International School of Lagos alongside his siblings.

Boulos described moving to Lagos as a culture shock. He learned French, Nigerian Pidgin and Yoruba and engaged with local customs during his formative years. He later pursued higher education in Los Angeles, California, where he studied liberal arts with a concentration in theatre. Following this, he moved to London to complete a master’s degree, focusing on acting and performance.

== Career ==
Boulos began exploring music during his teenage years, inspired by Nigerian musician Fela Kuti. In Lagos, he attended events at the New Afrika Shrine and performed Fela's songs during informal gatherings. During his time in Los Angeles, he wrote and performed a play titled Abami Eda and The Curse of The Black Gold, in which he portrayed multiple characters, including Fela Kuti.

In London, Boulos participated in acting projects, including an uncredited role in Fantastic Beasts: The Crimes of Grindelwald and a brief non-speaking role in the Netflix series The Crown.

In 2012, Boulos returned to Nigeria and released a single titled "One Day" under the stage name Farastafarian. This name, derived from his interactions with Rastafarian communities at Tarkwa Bay in Lagos, was later changed to Oyibo Rebel. The new stage name reflected his intention to challenge stereotypes about immigrants in Nigeria and highlight his connection to the culture.

Under the name Oyibo Rebel, Boulos released the single "Oju Mi Bloody," featuring Mz Kiss and Chinko Ekun. His music combines elements of Afrobeats, rap, and Yoruba influences. He worked with Nigerian producers T-Weezy and Killertunes to create tracks that incorporate both Nigerian and global musical styles.

=== Discography ===
Year	Title
2020	Oju Mi Bloody (feat. Chinko Ekun & Mz Kiss)
2020	Rosa (feat. Skales)
2020	The Storm
2020	Do Without You
2021	Familia (Freestyle)
2021	Aye Dun Gan

== Personal life ==
Boulos considers Nigeria his home. He is married to Alisa Boulos. His brother Michael Boulos is a business executive married to American socialite Tiffany Trump.
