= Kfaraakka =

Village in Koura District, Lebanon

Kfaraakka كفرعقا
- Village
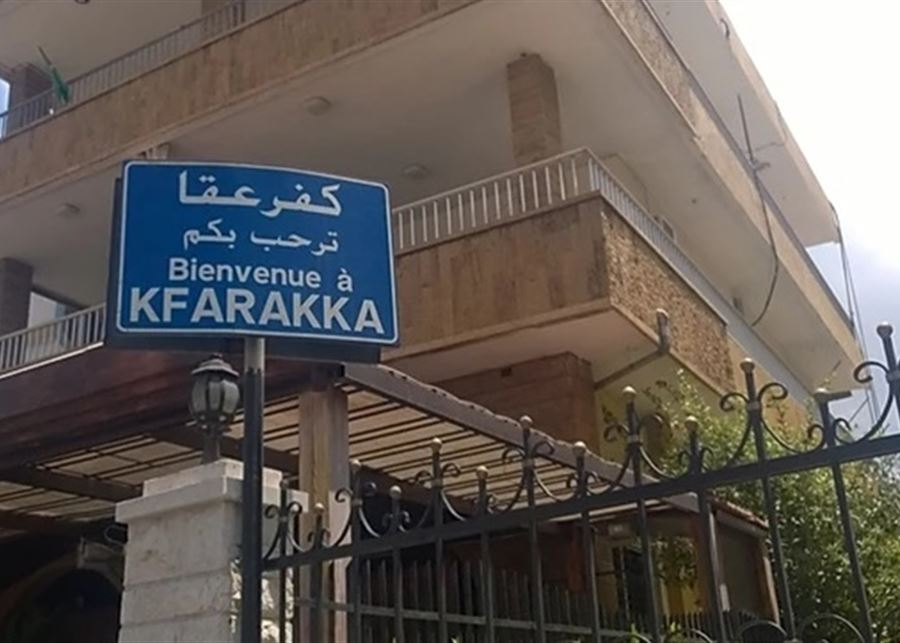

- Location within Lebanon
- Coordinates: 34°18′10.8″N 35°50′13.2″E
- Country: Lebanon
- Governorate: North Governorate
- District: Koura District

Government
  - Type: Municipality
  - Mayor: Elias Sassine
- Highest elevation: 430 m (1,410 ft)
- Lowest elevation: 360 m (1,180 ft)

Population (2014)
  - Total: 3,480
  - Religion: 88.97% Greek Orthodox
- Time zone: UTC+2 (EET)
  - Summer (DST): UTC+3 (EEST)
- Dialing code: +961
- Website: https://kafaraka.gov.lb/

Kfaraakka (Arabic: كفرعقا, romanized: Kfarʿaqqā), also spelled Kfarakka, is a village in the Koura District of Lebanon. It covers an area of 5.6 million square meters with an estimated population of 3,500. It had a population of 1,196 in 1953.

Kfaraakka produces and exports the most olive oil in Lebanon. It is about 350 meters above sea level, It has two hills: Mar Youhanna Hill, and Mar Nohra Hill. It is 17 kilometres from the coastal city of Tripoli and 11 kilometres from Chekka.

== Etymology ==
The village of Kfaraakka derives its name from the Aramaic language, composed of two words: Kafar and Aka. “Kafar” means village and "Aka" means sorrow, so the meaning of Kfaraakka is the village of sadness, gloom and distress.

== Religion ==
In 2014, Christians made up 98.65% of registered voters in Kfaraakka. 88.97% of the voters were Greek Orthodox.

=== Churches ===
- Anastasis Cathedral – Greek Orthodox.
- St. Georges – Greek Orthodox.
- St. Nohra – Greek Orthodox.
- St. Mary – Greek Orthodox.
- St. John The Baptist - Greek Orthodox.
- St. Simeon monastery - Greek Orthodox.
- St. Lucas - Greek Orthodox.
- St. Georges – Maronite.

== Education ==
There are two official complementary schools in Kfaraakka, one for males and one for females, a mixed public high school, a private professional institute (Freddy Atallah - IFA) and a branch of the American University for Culture and Education (AUCE).

== Street names ==
As of 2017, Kfaraakka has 10 named streets

- Al Biyad
- Al Seha
- Al Matriyeh
- Al Ramieh
- Dahr Al Mazraa
- Fouk Al Bir
- Mar Nohra
- Mar Youhanna
- Tahta
- Talaa

== History ==
=== Ottoman Era ===
In 1519, at the beginning of the Ottoman Era in Lebanon, the village was home to 67 adult Christian males and 4 adult Muslim ones. By 1571, the population had increased to 95 adult Christian males, though with only 3 adult Muslim males by this point.

=== French Occupation ===
The relationship with the French army was unstable. Many problems occurred between Kfarakka Citizens and the Algerians, Senegalese and Moroccans inductees in the French army. General de Gaulle has visited Kfarakka several times, especially the area of “Al Bader”, to meet the French soldiers.

=== 1976-1978 ===
Between 1976 and 1978, Kfarakka was under the control of the Lebanese Front.

=== 1978-2005 ===
From 1978 until the withdrawal of the Syrian army, Kafaraka was part of the Syrian-controlled areas in Lebanon.

On 11 July 1984, pro-Syrian Marada Militia ousted SSNP and took control of Kfarakka until the end of the civil war in 1990.

== Notable people ==
- Massad Boulos
- Michael Boulos
- Philippe Najib Boulos
