= Al Fajr (Jerusalem) =

Arabic newspaper in East Jerusalem (1972–1993)

- Type: Weekly newspaper (April 1972–February 1974); Daily newspaper (February 1974–July 1993)
- Founder: Yousef Nasri Nasser
- Publisher: Paul Ajlouny (from 1974)
- Founded: 7 April 1972
- Ceased publication: July 1993
- Political alignment: Palestinian nationalism
- Language: Arabic
- Headquarters: East Jerusalem
- Sister newspapers: Al Fajr English

Al Fajr (Arabic: الفجر, romanized: Al-Fajr, lit. 'The Dawn') was an East Jerusalem-based newspaper which was in circulation from 1972 to 1993. The paper functioned as an unofficial organ of the Palestine Liberation Organization (PLO).

== History and profile ==
Al Fajr was established by Yousef Nasri Nasser in East Jerusalem in 1972. Its first issue appeared on 7 April 1972. The paper came out weekly until 5 June 1974 when its frequency switched to daily. Yousef Nasri Nasser also edited the paper from the outset, until February 1974, when he went missing. Mohammad Batrawi edited Al Fajr until 1976, and then Bashir Al Barghouthi began to serve as its editor-in-chief. Paul Ajlouny was the publisher of the paper who took over it in 1974 after the disappearance of his brother-in-law, Yousef Nasri Nasser.

There was an English edition of the newspaper entitled Al Fajr English was appeared weekly in Jerusalem and Washington, D.C. between 23 April 1980 and 16 August 1993. Bishara Bahbah was the editor-in-chief of both Arabic and English editions of Al Fajr for one year between 1983 and 1984. The paper also had a monthly literary supplement.

Like other Arabic-language publications in Israel, Al Fajr was subject to increased censorship following the Israeli invasion of Lebanon in 1982. Israel banned its distribution on the West Bank in July 1982.

After the Oslo Accords in 1993, Ajlouny and Al Fajr were critical of the PLO, one of the first instances of criticism of the PLO and Yasir Arafat in the Palestinian press. In an article titled "Revolution," Ajlouny complained about the lack of accountability and financial corruption. of PLO leaders.

Al Fajr folded in July 1993 due to financial problems. Its daily circulation was just 3,000 copies before its closure. Hanna Siniora was the last editor-in-chief from 1978 until its closure in 1993.

== Editorial position ==
The newspaper was funded by the Fatah faction of the PLO and generally held to be its mouthpiece, some contributors members of Fatah. Journalist Khaled Abu Toameh, who worked for the paper, argued in 2004 that it was strictly controlled by Arafat's office in Tunisia and was like a PLO institution.

== Archived copies ==
The issues of Al Fajr were archived by The Palestinian Museum. The Peace Education Center of Michigan State University archived its issues published between 28 June 1985 and 30 September 1991. The University of Chicago Library also has a partial archive of the paper.
