= Paul Ajlouny =

Palestinian-American publisher

Paul A. Ajlouny بول عجلوني
- Born: 1933 (age 92–93); Ramallah, British Mandatory Palestine
- Occupations: Publisher and businessman

Paul A. Ajlouny (born 1933) is a Palestinian-American publisher and businessman known for launching the now-defunct Palestinian newspaper Al Fajr in 1972 in Jerusalem.

== Biography ==
Ajlouny was born in Ramallah, British Mandatory Palestine in 1933, and immigrated to the United States in 1946. He earned a degree in engineering from the University of Kentucky in 1963.

Aljouny founded Jerusalem-based Al Fajr newspaper in 1967 to respond to the educated Palestinian professional elite who saw the PLO as their representative. The media environment in Palestine at that time was dominated by broadsheets published by the Jordanian government. In 1993, Columbia Journal Review described Al-Fajr as "gradually turning into a Palestinian version of Pravda", and the publication lost readership to more independent newspapers, Al-Quds and An-Nahar. Ajlouny ran Al Fajr from New York, and eventually he struggled to keep up with costs, and the paper was shut down on June 23, 1993. Ajlouny claimed he was losing $25,000 per month to keep it operational.

In the 1970s, while living in Hempstead, Long Island, Ajlouny claimed to be an advisor to the PLO. In November 1979, a U.S. district court in Brooklyn found him guilty of attempting to smuggle stolen communications equipment to the Middle East in early 1978. The equipment, much of it owned by New York Telephone Company, was discovered by customs inspectors in April 1978. Federal prosecutors alleged that Aljouny's smuggling was part of a scheme to set up an independent telecommunications network for the PLO.

In the 1980s, Ajlouny was a leader in the Palestinian community on Long Island. Ajlouny identified himself as a supporter of the PLO in 1984 and called for mutual recognition between Israel and a demilitarized Palestinian state.

After the Oslo Accords in 1993, Ajlouny and Al-Fajr were critical of the PLO, one of the first instances of criticism of the PLO and Yasir Arafat in the Palestinian press. In an article titled "Revolution," Ajlouny complained about the lack of accountability and financial corruption. of PLO leaders.
