= List of Kappa Alpha Theta members =

This is a list of notable members of Kappa Alpha Theta, a North American college women's fraternity. This list includes both initiated and honorary members.

== Academics ==
- Elva Bascom (Mu, Allegheny) – librarian, professor, writer on library science
- Mary Ritter Beard (Alpha, DePauw) – noted historian, campaigner for women's suffrage
- Molly Corbett Broad (Chi, Syracuse) – president of the University of North Carolina, 1997–2006
- Matilda Moldenhauer Brooks (Alpha Omega, Pittsburgh) – research scientist who discovered methylene blue
- Gertrude Simmons Burlingham (Chi, Syracuse) – mycologist, first woman to earn a Ph.D. from Columbia University through the program at the New York Botanical Garden in 1908
- Anna Botsford Comstock (Iota, Cornell) – first woman appointed to the faculty at Cornell
- Mary Lee Edward (Sigma, Toronto) – women's health pioneer and World War I hero
- Dian Fossey (Gamma Xi, San Jose State) – zoologist, first female primatologist, wrote Gorillas in the Mist
- Eilene Galloway (Alpha Iota, Washington University in St. Louis) – researcher and editor
- Edith Jordan Gardner (Phi Deuteron, Stanford) – educator and suffrage activist
- Elizabeth Gilmore Holt (Psi, Wisconsin) – art historian
- Samantha Joye (Delta Xi, UNC Chapel Hill) – oceanographer
- Karen Ordahl Kupperman (Alpha Mu, Missouri) – American historian
- Maud Menten (Sigma, Toronto) – physician, scientist
- Margaret Floy Washburn (Iota, Cornell) – first woman to receive a Ph.D. in Psychology

== Arts and entertainment ==
- Sasha Alexander (Omicron, USC) – actress (NCIS, Rizzoli & Isles)
- Ann-Margret (Tau, Northwestern) – actress (State Fair, Viva Las Vegas, Grumpy Old Men)
- Valerie Bettis – (Alpha Theta, Texas-Austin) dancer/choreographer
- Susan Browning (Beta Phi, Penn State) – Tony Award-winning actress
- Melanie Chandra (Phi Deuteron, Stanford University - actress (Code Black)
- Sarah Clarke (Beta, Indiana) – actress (24)
- Nancy Coleman (Alpha Lambda, Washington) – actress
- Jane Connell (Omega, UC Berkeley) – actress
- Joan Ganz Cooney (Beta Delta, Arizona) – founder of the Children's Television Workshop and creator of Sesame Street
- DaNae Couch (Epsilon Epsilon, Baylor) – Miss Texas 2012
- Sheryl Crow (Alpha Mu, Missouri) – Grammy Award-winning singer
- Agnes de Mille (Beta Xi, UCLA) – Broadway choreographer
- Marietta DePrima (Tau, Northwestern) – actress
- Marion Dougherty (Beta Phi, Penn State) – casting director
- Patricia DuBose Duncan (Alpha Iota, Washington University in St. Louis) – artist
- Cindy Chupack (Tau, Northwestern) – Golden Globe & Emmy Award-winning screenwriter and producer
- Ronnie Claire Edwards (Alpha Omicron, Oklahoma) – actress
- Glenna Goodacre (Beta Omega, Colorado College) – sculptor of the Vietnam Women's Memorial, designer of U.S. gold one-dollar coin featuring Sacagawea
- Amy Grant (Alpha Eta, Vanderbilt) – singer, Grammy Award winner
- Dorothy Hart (Beta Tau, Denison) – actress
- Jennifer Jones (Tau, Northwestern) – Academy Award-winning actress
- Laura Lamson (Gamma deuteron, Ohio Wesleyan) – screenwriter
- Cinta Laura (Epsilon Upsilon, Columbia) – Indonesian movie and pop star
- Mallory James Mahoney (Gamma Psi, Texas Christian) – actress
- Jacqui Malouf (Gamma Epsilon, Western Ontario) – television host, cook, author
- Stephanie March (Tau, Northwestern) – actress (Law & Order: Special Victims Unit)
- Rue McClanahan (Gamma Tau, Tulsa) – actress (The Golden Girls)
- Amy McKenzie (Beta Xi, UC Los Angeles) – producer, director, actress
- Lexi Minetree (Omicron, USC) – actress
- Karen Moncrieff (Tau, Northwestern) – actress, director, screenwriter
- Dora Mavor Moore (Sigma, Toronto) – actress, director
- Julie Moran (Gamma Delta, UGA) – former host of Entertainment Tonight; first female host of ABC's Wide World of Sports; current host of Insiders List on the Fine Living channel
- Carol Morris (Beta Kappa, Drake University) – Miss USA (1956), Miss Universe (1956)
- Mary Kay Place (Gamma Tau, Tulsa) – actress (Being John Malkovich, The Rainmaker)
- Skyler Samuels (Phi Deuteron, Stanford) – actress (Nine Lives of Chloe King, Scream Queens)
- Sara Schaefer (Beta Lambda, College of William & Mary) – comedian and host of MTV's Nikki & Sara Live
- Marlo Thomas (Omicron, USC) – actress and spokeswoman for St. Jude's Children's Hospital
- Kate Voegele (Gamma Upsilon, Miami (Ohio)) – singer/songwriter and One Tree Hill actress
- Jenna von Oÿ (Omicron, USC) – actress (Blossom)
- Maurine Dallas Watkins (Gamma, Butler) – playwright (Chicago (1926))
- Teal Wicks (Epsilon Sigma, UC Irvine) – singer/actress, best known for playing Elphaba in the musical Wicked
- Bea Millan-Windorski (Psi, Wisconsin) -Miss Earth USA(2024), Miss Earth Water(2024).
- Ashley Zais (Zeta Eta, Wofford College, SC) – Miss South Carolina USA 200

== Business ==
- Tory Burch (Beta Eta, University of Pennsylvania) – fashion designer
- Carolyn S. Chambers (Alpha Xi, Oregon) – owner and CEO of Chambers Communications Corporation
- Tracy Britt Cool (Zeta Xi) – business executive at Berkshire Hathaway
- Melinda Gates (Beta Rho, Duke) – former wife of Bill Gates; co-founder of Bill & Melinda Gates Foundation
- Prerna Gupta (Phi Deuteron, Stanford) – CEO of Telepathic Inc.
- Elizabeth Holmes (Phi Deuteron, Stanford) – founder and former CEO of now-defunct Theranos, convicted of criminal fraud
- Marjorie Child Husted (Upsilon, Minnesota) – creator of Betty Crocker
- Dylan Lauren (Beta Rho, Duke) – owner of Dylan's Candy Bar and daughter of fashion designer Ralph Lauren
- Mary Wells Lawrence (Gamma Theta, Carnegie Mellon) – advertisement executive, founding president of Wells Rich Greene, first female CEO of a company listed on the New York Stock Exchange
- Kira Plastinina (Beta Sigma, Southern Methodist) – fashion designer
- Hope Skillman Schary (Alpha Delta, Goucher) – textile designer, founder and chief executive of Skillmill

== Politics ==
- Karen Koning AbuZayd (Alpha, DePauw) – Commissioner-General of the United Nations Relief and Works Agency, 2005–2010
- Eva Bertrand Adams (Beta Mu, Nevada) – Director of the United States Mint 1961–1969
- Jean Spencer Ashbrook (Alpha Gamma, Ohio State) – United States House Representative from Ohio
- Frances Cleveland Axtell (Alpha, DePauw) – one of the first female State Representatives of Washington
- Nancy Kassebaum Baker (Kappa, Kansas) – former United States Senator; first woman elected to the United States Senate who had not succeeded her husband or first been appointed to fill an unexpired term
- Barbara Bodine (Gamma Rho, UC Santa Barbara) – United States Ambassador to Yemen
- Barbara Pierce Bush (Epsilon Tau, Yale University) – daughter of President George W. Bush; co-founder and president of the Global Health Corp.
- Laura Bush (Beta Sigma, Southern Methodist) – First Lady of the United States; wife of President George W. Bush
- Pearl Chase (Omega, UC Berkeley) – civic leader
- Lynne Cheney (Beta Omega, Colorado College) – chair, National Endowment for the Humanities; Senior Fellow, American Enterprise Institute; director, Reader's Digest; former co-host of CNN's Crossfire; Second Lady of the United States; wife of Vice President Dick Cheney
- Barbara Brandriff Crabb (Psi, Wisconsin) – Senior United States District Judge
- Anna Elizabeth Dickinson (Alpha, DePauw) – influential abolitionist and suffragist
- Joyce Fairbairn (Beta Chi, Alberta) – Canadian senator
- Mary Fallin (Beta Zeta, Oklahoma State) – first woman to be elected lieutenant governor of Oklahoma; 1st woman to be elected Governor of Oklahoma; U.S. House of Representatives
- Tillie K. Fowler (Delta Zeta, Emory) – United States Representative from Florida
- Barbara Hackman Franklin (Beta Phi, Penn State) – 29th U.S. Secretary of Commerce; CEO of Barbara Franklin Enterprises
- Jenna Bush Hager (Alpha Theta, University of Texas) – daughter of President George W. Bush
- Margaret Hance (Beta Delta, Arizona) – first female mayor of Phoenix, Arizona
- Nancy Hanks (Beta Rho, Duke) – 1st woman to serve as the Chairman of the United States National Endowment for the Arts
- Victoria Reggie Kennedy (Alpha Phi, Tulane) – wife of the late Senator Ted Kennedy
- Susan King (Alpha Theta, University of Texas) – Republican member of the Texas House of Representatives from Abilene, Texas
- Cindy Hensley McCain (Omicron, USC) – executive director of the World Food Programme, former U.S. Ambassador to the United Nations Agencies for Food and Agriculture, and wife of 2008 presidential candidate Senator John McCain
- Claire McCaskill (Alpha Mu, Missouri) – U.S. Congress Senator from Missouri
- Tricia McLaughlin, political spokesperson
- Jeanne Milliken Bonds (Delta Xi, UNC Chapel Hill) – politician; served as mayor of Knightdale, deputy director of the North Carolina Administrative Office of the Courts.
- Adelaide Sinclair (Sigma, Toronto) – Canadian public servant
- Shanta Vasisht – Indian parliamentarian
- Elizabeth Warren (Gamma Kappa, George Washington University) – United States Senator from Massachusetts
- Gretchen Whitmer (Beta Pi, Michigan State University) – 49th governor of Michigan

== Sports ==
- Lucille Ash (Beta Omega, Colorado) – Olympic figure skater
- Pauline Betz (Gamma Gamma, Rollins) – tennis player
- Louise Brough (Omicron, Southern California) – tennis player
- Madonna Buder (Alpha Iota, Washington University in St. Louis) – Catholic religious sister, Senior Olympian and triathlete record holder
- JoAnne Carner (Delta Epsilon, Arizona State) – professional golfer
- Ann Curtis (Omega, UC Berkeley) – Olympic gold medalist, swimming (1948)
- Sasha DiGiulian (Epsilon Upsilon, Columbia) – world champion rock climber
- Kathy Ellis (Beta, Indiana) – Olympic swimmer
- Jane Fauntz (Delta, Illinois) – Olympic bronze medalist swimmer and diver
- Aria Fischer (Phi Deuteron, Stanford) – Olympic gold medalist water polo player
- Makenzie Fischer (Phi Deuteron, Stanford) – Olympic gold medalist water polo player
- Linda Gustavson (Beta Pi, Michigan State) – Olympic swimmer and world record holder
- Shirley Fry Irvin (Gamma Gamma, Rollins) – tennis player
- Helen Jacobs (Omega, UC Berkeley) – tennis player
- Pamela Kruse (Beta Pi, Michigan State) – Olympic silver-medalist swimmer
- Yeardley Love (Delta Chi, Virginia) – lacross player
- Barbara McIntire (Gamma Gamma, Rollins) – golfer
- Christen Press (Phi Deuteron, Stanford) – 2015 Women's World Cup champion for the US
- Kerri Strug (Beta Xi, UCLA) – Olympic gymnast
- Chierika Ukogu (Phi Deuteron, Stanford) – Olympic rower for Nigeria

== Media ==
- Carolina Bermudez (Delta Epsilon, Arizona State) – radio personality on WHTZ Z100 (New York), the biggest Top 40 station in the world
- Ally Blake (Theta Theta, North Carolina State University) – broadcast meteorologist at WFTS Tampa Bay 28 in Tampa, Florida; former meteorologist at WMAR-2 News in Baltimore, MD &WKYT-TV in Lexington, KY
- Deb Carson (Epsilon Epsilon, Baylor) – national sports anchor and on-air personality, Fox Sports Radio
- Kelly Corrigan (Epsilon Psi, Richmond) – author
- Harriet Doerr (Phi Deuteron, Stanford) – writer
- Clara Elizabeth Fanning (Upsilon, Minnesota) – editor
- Isabelle Holland (Alpha Phi, Tulane) – author
- Amy Holmes (Epsilon Mu, Princeton) – journalist, news anchor
- Suzanne La Follette (Alpha Sigma, Washington State) – author, journalist, and libertarian feminist advocate
- Kate Lehrer (Gamma Psi, Texas Christian) – novelist, book reviewer, writer
- Jean Marzollo (Gamma Zeta, Connecticut) – children's author and illustrator
- Mary Margaret McBride (Alpha Mu, Missouri) – widely followed radio commentator, journalist, author (1935–1955)
- Alexi McCammond (Epsilon Phi, Chicago) – political reporter, Axios
- Judith Miller (Alpha Gamma, Ohio State) – journalist
- Kate Millett (Upsilon, Minnesota) – feminist and author
- Anne Marie Pace (Beta Lambda, William and Mary) – children's book author, author of the Vampirina Ballerina series
- Marjorie Kinnan Rawlings (Psi, Wisconsin) – author (The Yearling)
- Kate Snow (Iota, Cornell) – anchor for Good Morning America
- Melissa Stark (Delta Chi, Virginia) – news reporter, Monday Night Football
- Ida Tarbell (Mu, Allegheny College) – journalist

== Miscellaneous ==
- Jennifer Bertrand (Kappa, University of Kansas) – winner of HGTV Design Star season three
- Neilia Hunter Biden (Chi, Syracuse) – teacher, first wife of Joe Biden
- Katie Lee Joel (Gamma Upsilon, Miami University Ohio) – chef, restaurant critic, former wife of Billy Joel
- Dorothy Liebes (Omega, UC Berkeley) – "mother of modern weaving"
- Marion Manley (Delta, Illinois) – received the Gold Medal Award in 1973 from the Florida Association of the American Institute of Architects
- Edith McAllister (University of Texas at Austin) — civic leader and philanthropist in San Antonio, Texas
- Julia Morgan (Omega, UC Berkeley) – designed the Hearst Castle, first woman to receive the AIA Gold Medal
- Carol Morris (Beta Kappa, Drake) – second Miss USA to win the Miss Universe title, in the pageant's fifth edition in 1956
- Shelby Ringdahl (Gamma Psi, TCU) – 2013 Miss Missouri winner and 2014 Miss America semifinalist
- Tiffany Trump (Beta Eta, University of Pennsylvania) – socialite, law school graduate, daughter of Donald Trump
