= Maged N. Kamel Boulos =

British health informatician, scientist and Full Professor

- Education: Ain Shams University (MB BCh) King's College London (MSc) City, University of London (PhD)
- Known for: Pioneer in spatial health informatics and Web 2.0 applications in health and medicine
- Awards: Fellow of the Royal Geographical Society (FRGS); Fellow of the Chartered Institute for IT (FBCS); Fellow of the Higher Education Academy (FHEA)
- Scientific career
- Fields: GIS in health, mHealth, spatial epidemiology, web-based GIS, AI in medicine

Maged N. Kamel Boulos is a British health informatician, scientist and Full Professor of Digital Health with Sun Yat-sen University in China, having worked before that at the Alexander Graham Bell Centre of Digital Health, University of the Highlands and Islands, at the University of Plymouth, at the University of Bath and at City University London. Other held affiliations include Universidade de Lisboa (Visiting professor in 2022). He is particularly known for his research into Geographic Information Systems (GIS) applications in health and healthcare, which received wide news media coverage. He is credited with coining the phrases 'online consumer geoinformatics services' and 'wikification of GIS by the masses' in 2005, when neogeography and virtual globes were still very new.

Kamel Boulos is Founder and Editor-in-Chief of the Open Access, MEDLINE-indexed International Journal of Health Geographics, published by BioMed Central since 2002. He is co-chair of WG IV/4: Virtual Globes and Context-Aware Visualisation/Analysis within the International Society for Photogrammetry and Remote Sensing (ISPRS) Commission IV Geodatabases and Digital Mapping, 2008–2012.

== Early life and education ==
Kamel Boulos attended the Jesuit Collège de la Sainte Famille in Cairo and then studied at Ain Shams University. He went on to graduate with a Master of Science (MSc) in Health Informatics from King's College London's GKT School of Medical Education and complete a PhD in Measurement and Information of Medicine and at City, University of London.

== See also ==
- GIS and Public Health
