= Philippe Najib Boulos =

Lebanese jurist and politician (1902–1979)

Philippe Najib Boulos فيليب نجيب بولس
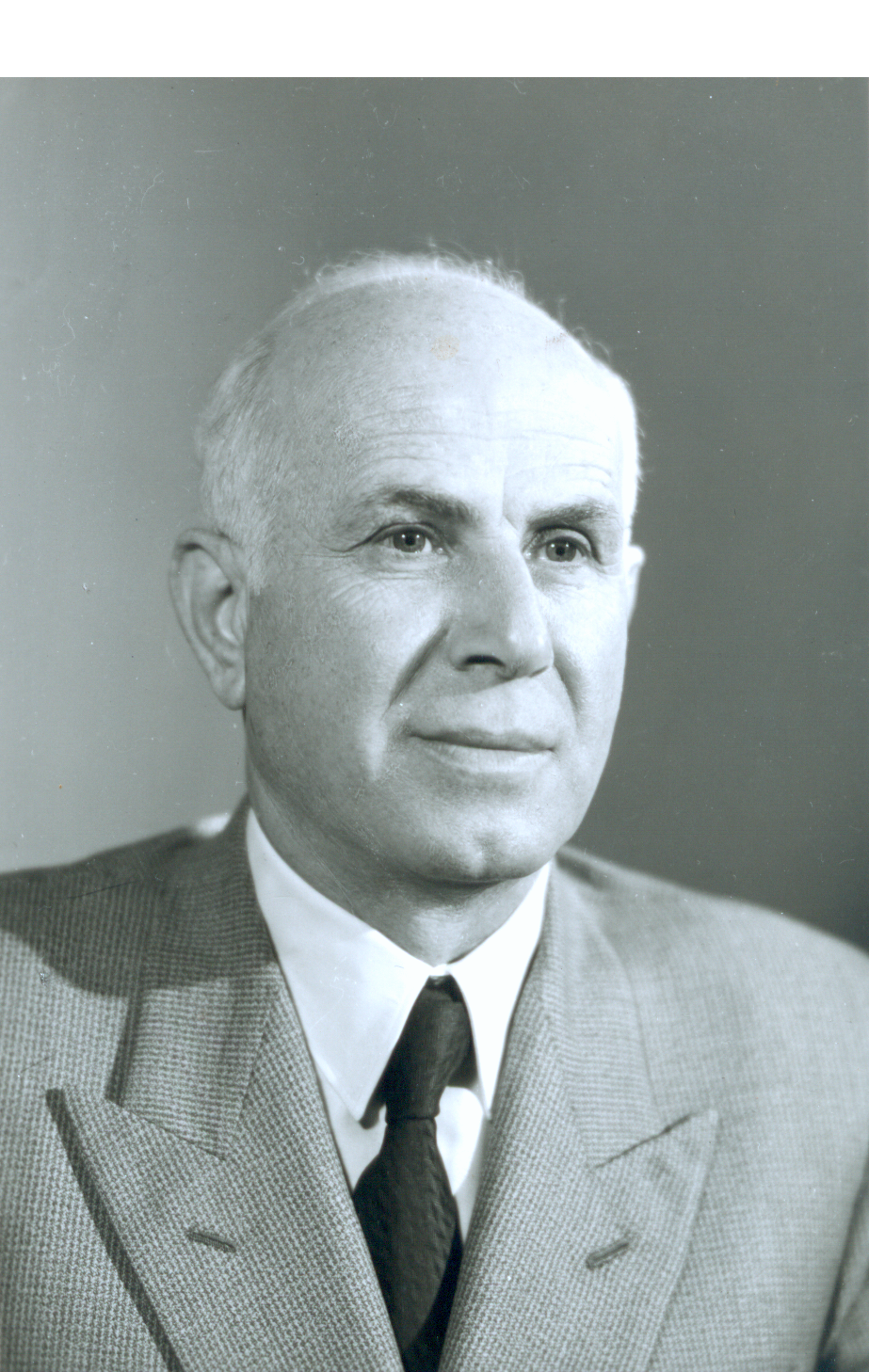

Personal details
- Born: 1902 Beirut, Ottoman Empire
- Died: 1979 (aged 76–77) Beirut, Lebanon
- Resting place: Kfarakka, Lebanon
- Spouse: Julie Tamer
- Education: Saint Joseph University

Philippe Najib Boulos (Arabic: فيليب نجيب بولس; 1902–1979) was a lawyer and an active figure of Lebanon's politics in the 20th century. He worked as a lawyer and involved in Lebanon's politics from 1941 until his death. During that period, he was named as the cabinet minister three times and deputy three times, contributing to different sectors of Lebanon's politics such as education, justice and public work.

== Personal life ==
Philippe Boulos was born in 1902 in Beirut, the son of Najib Boulos and Abla Hayek and the brother of Hortense Boulos. Originally from Koura (North-Lebanon), he studied law at the Saint Joseph University in Beirut, and received his degree at the French School of Law with the highest honours.

In 1931, he married Julie Tamer with whom he had four children: Najib, May, Nadim and Samia.

After being appointed a judge in 1923 and then President of the Appeal Court until 1940, he worked as a lawyer.

Boulos died in 1979 and was buried in his village of Kfarakka.

== Political life ==
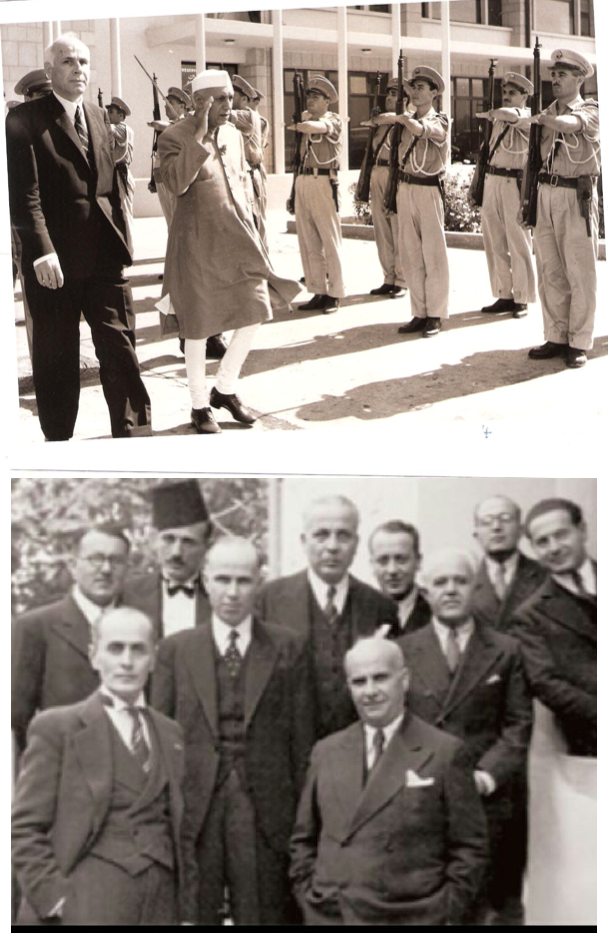
Philippe Boulos with Nehru in 1962 (upper) and with the 1941 government (lower)

Under the presidency of Alfred Naqqache, he was appointed minister of education in 1940, then deputy prime minister. In 1941 he became minister of justice and foreign Affairs, and the following year minister of public works.

Under the presidency of Béchara El-Khoury, he was elected deputy from the North Governate, deputy prime minister and minister of public works in 1951. In 1952, he was elected vice president of the Lebanese Parliament.

Under the presidency of Fuad Chehab, he was appointed governor of the city of Beirut in 1959, then elected as a deputy from Koura in 1960 and re-elected in 1964. He became again deputy prime minister and minister of justice and economics in 1961. From 1961 to 1964, Boulos led the ministry of information, orientation and tourism.

With other judges, Boulos was highly involved in drafting the Penal Code of Lebanon which was promulgated in 1941 and still holds today. He was a member of the International Commission of Jurists in Geneva and represented Lebanon throughout his life at numerous international conferences.

== Political functions ==
- 1940: Secretariat of Education and Youth
- 1941: Deputy Prime Minister of Lebanon, Minister of Justice and Economics
- 1942: Minister of Foreign Affairs and Public Work
- 1951: Deputy of the Sector of Zgharta-Koura-Batroun-Bécharré, Deputy Prime Minister in the Lebanese government, Minister of Public Work
- 1952: Vice President of the Lebanese Parliament
- 1960: "Mouhafez" of Beirut city, Deputy of Koura
- 1961: Deputy Prime Minister, Minister of information, Minister of Justice and Economics
- 1961-1964: Minister of Information, Orientation and Tourism
- 1964: Deputy of Koura
