= Issa Boulos =

American composer

- عيسى بولص
- Born: 1968 (age 57–58); Jerusalem
- Citizenship: American
- Education: Columbia College Chicago, Roosevelt University, Leiden University
- Occupations: oud player, composer, music scholar
- Employer: Harper College
- Website: http://www.issaboulos.com/

Issa Boulos (Arabic: عيسى بولص) is a Palestinian-American oud player, composer, and music scholar.

== Biography ==
Boulos was born in Jerusalem in 1968. He grew up in a musical family in Ramallah and studied music as a child, including the oud at the Institute of Fine Arts. In his early career, he created over 200 compositions and directed several musical groups, including a dance troupe called Al-Funoun.

Boulos first travelled to the US in 1986. After several visits to Chicago, he moved there in the 1990s and studied music composition, first at Columbia College Chicago and later at Roosevelt University. His teachers at the latter included Robert Lombardo. In 1995, he became a US citizen. Beginning in 1998, he directed the Middle East Music Ensemble at University of Chicago, which performed classical Arabic music and featured instruments like ouds, baglamas, nays, qanuns, and darbukkahs. He also taught at the University and founded the Issa Boulos Quartet, which played Arabic jazz.

In September 2006, the Chicago Symphony Orchestra appeared at the World Music Festival for the first time where they and Boulos's Radio Maqam Ensemble performed some of Boulos's compositions. The orchestra also performed pieces by Tan Dun and Chen Yi. In an interview later that year with the Chicago Tribune, Boulos described maqam as "a bunch of melodies that are congenial to each other. Kind of like having a love affair between two people who are tied together and there are certain rules that determine the relationship and movement of the sounds."

Rif (Countryside) was released in 2007, featuring Nermin Kaygusuz playing Boulos's compositions for the kemence. The instrumental music was inspired by elements of the Mediterranean, including fig trees, soil, and dew. One track, "Raqsat al-Khityar", is about an elderly man dancing at a wedding after his wife's death.

The following year, Al-Hallaj was released, which Boulos had composed based on the work of the eponymous Sufi poet. The album was recorded in Ramallah with several musicians, including two of his former students. Boulos contributed oud and vocals. One reviewer called him "an Arab-American intellectual powerhouse whose work is highly significant in maintaining musical artistry little appreciated by Arab societies."

Boulos served as director of the University of Chicago’s Middle East Music Ensemble from 1998 to 2010, with a brief interruption when he served in Ramallah at the National Palestine Conservatory. During his tenure as Ensemble’s director, he created an ecosystem around the Ensemble. He grew its membership exponentially through engaging with Chicago’s diverse Middle Eastern communities and by offering educational and performance opportunities to those who otherwise didn’t have any venues or outlets to showcase their talents and culture. He obtained support from the University and the community, and the Ensemble continued to grow and flourish. At some point, President Don Michael Randel and the Music Department requested that he collaborate with the renowned Silk Road Ensemble and Alim Qasimov, who were coming for a residency at the University, and the collaboration was a significant success.

During his tenure, he arranged hundreds of songs and instrumental repertoire from Turkey, the Arab World, Iran, Asia Minor, Greece, North Africa, and Central Asia. He covered a vast array of genres from muwashshaḥ, folk, contemporary, pop, classical, Arabisque, Ottoman, and protest to malūf. He put on hundreds of concerts around Chicago and at the University of Chicago community, and grew every venue the Ensemble occupied into all-sold-out events. By the time he left the Ensemble to lead the Qatar Music Academy, the Ensemble’s membership had grown to over 70 individuals, who performed on and off, depending on the repertoire. Boulos recorded and released the Ensemble’s only album, which was a culmination of the efforts and input from members of the community and Chicago’s musicians.

Collectively, Boulos’s works include traditional and contemporary maqām compositions and arrangements, jazz, avant-garde, film, and theatre scores, notably those for Lysistrata 2000, Catharsis, and the documentaries The New Americans and Nice Bombs.

Boulos uses a variety of traditional instruments and utilizes the melodic material of maqām. His blend of tradition and innovation has forged important musical links between various musical traditions. He has received many awards and fellowships.In the 2010s, Boulos headed the Arab Music Department at Qatar Music Academy. He later co-edited an anthology about the music and culture of the Persian Gulf and Arabian Peninsula, entitled Music in Arabia: Perspectives on Heritage, Mobility, and Nation (2021).

Boulos has researched 20th century Palestinian music. He completed a PhD in ethnomusicology from Leiden University in 2020 with a dissertation entitled "The Palestinian music-making experience in the West Bank, 1920s to 1959: Nationalism, colonialism, and identity". In his 2013 article "Negotiating the Elements: Palestinian Freedom Songs from 1967 to 1987", Boulos writes about influential Palestinian musicians, including Mustafa al-Kurd and the group al-Baraem.

As of 2025, Boulos is the Community Music Center Manager at Harper College in Palatine, Illinois.

== Selected works ==
Albums

- 2026: The Dark Side of the Moon, original works for guitar and voice, Chicago, France. Aria Music Publication.
- 2019: Bonfire, original instrumental and vocal works for chamber mixed orchestra, Chicago.
- 2011: Little Composers, arranged children's songs. Nawa Records, Jerusalem.
- 2010: Sunny and Breezy, original instrumental works. Nawa Records, Jerusalem.
- 2009: Being Peace, original songs. Nawa Records, Chicago.
- 2008: Al-‘Hallaj, eight original songs for mixed Ensemble. Nawa Records, Chicago.
- 2007: Music for the documentary Nice Bombs
- 2008: Sama':Music of the Middle East for a large Middle Eastern Ensemble.
- 2007: Rif, original compositions for Turkish. Nawa Records, Chicago.
- 2003: One World, One Language, original composition for Lingua Musica, Chicago.
- 1989: Side Street, original songs by Jamil al-Sayih, Jerusalem (‘ud, percussion and arrangements).
- 1986: Al-‘Ashiq, Palestinian folk (‘ud and arrangements).

Selected Compositions ' Solo Instruments (or takht)'

- A Girl From My Hometown. 1999.
- At Night (Violin).
- Midnight Meditation.
- Raqsit al-Khityar.
- Bashraf Nahawand.
- Sama’i Nahawand 2.
- Sama’i Nahawand 1.
- Sama’i Kurd.
- Zaytun.
- Gharib.
- Masafa (Distance).
- 'Ishq.
- al-Hakawati.
- Longa Niriz.
- Raqs al-Janub.
- Raqsit al-Khityar (Rif album)
- Veranda.
- Wara al-Shari'.
- Shahrazad (Flute).
- Sabah.
- Murur.
- Mishwar.
- Lysistrata (Kora)

Piano

- Tailor and a Cynic.
- Canon in B Minor and D Major.
- Hijaz.
- It Smells.
- Let Me Pass (Rondo).
- Scherzo.
- Fugue in B Minor.
- Not Hijaz.
- Sunrise.
- Minuet in C Major.
- Minuet in F Major.
- Noitnevni 14.

Chamber and Ensemble

- al Dhayiriyyah. 1990
- Naji (Rust Dust Pink and Roses, and Against the Wall).
- Speak Out (Piano, Accordion, Bass, Percussion).
- Fi Salam (Flute, Bass Clarinet, 'Ud, Piano, Buzuq, Bass, Percussion).
- Ubunto (Piano, Nay, Clarinet, 'Ud, Bass, Buzuq, Percussion, Qanun).
- I Can't Tell You (Piano, Accordion, Bass, Percussion).
- I`hki (‘ud flute bass percussion).
- Raqs al-Janub (‘Ud, Clarinet, Violin, Cello, Bass, Guitar, Percussion).
- Sama’i For an Unspecified Reason (String Quartet, Clarinet, Riq).
- Plug Him In (String Quintet).
- Enough Of You Tired of U To U (String Quartet and Harp).
- Resolutions (String Quintet).
- Tao (Violin and Harp) (Violin and Piano).
- Smoking Outside (String Quartet and Harp).
- Salatun Liya.1998
- Layali. (‘Ud, Clarinet, Guitar, Percussion, Violin, Cello, Bass).
- Lake Michigan. 1993.
- Once Upon a Time (String Quartet and Harp).
- That Evening (String Quartet, Flute, Clarinet, Guitar, Piano, Bass, Percussion, 'Ud, Buzuq).
- Places, Spaces, and Pink Lights (Guitar, 'Ud, Clarinet, Percussion).
- Yafa (String Quartet, Flute, Clarinet, Guitar, Piano, Bass, Percussion, 'Ud, Buzuq).
- Wajaz (String Quartet, Flute, Clarinet, Guitar, Piano, Bass, Percussion, 'Ud, Buzuq).
- Sunrise (String Quartet, Flute, Clarinet, Guitar, Piano, Bass, Percussion, 'Ud, Buzuq).
- Maxwell Street (String Quartet, Flute, Clarinet, Guitar, Piano, Bass, Percussion, 'Ud, Buzuq).
- Bonfire (String Quartet, Flute, Clarinet, Guitar, Piano, Bass, Percussion, 'Ud, Buzuq).
- Fences (Piano and Qanun).
- You're Bad (Woodwind Quintet).
- That’s Her. 1992.
- Entrance (Another Planet Album). 1993.
- Strike I (Another Planet Album). 1993.
- Strike II (Another Planet Album). 1993.
- Exit to! (Another Planet Album). 1993.
- Intisar. (Another Planet Album). 1993.
- al-Dukhul I (Another Planet Album). 1993.
- al-Dukul II (Another Planet Album). 1993.
- al-Wujuh (Faces). (Another Planet Album). 1993.
- Taftish (Inspection). (Another Planet Album). 1993.
- Idrab ʿAn al-Mawt (Strike on Death). (Another Planet Album). 1993.
- Idrab ʿAn al-Mawt II (Strike on Death). (Another Planet Album). 1993.
- Yimkin Haik (Maybe If We Do it This Way!).
- Sparkle
- My Soul
- Love
- Why Are We Still Talking?
- Alienation
- Alienation II
- Shitty News (Akhbar Bit…)
- Umar al-Khayyam
- Ramallah 95. 1995.
- Homeless ... to Richard

Orchestra

- Shortly After Life.
- Pastiche.
- Manfa (Orchestra and Takht).
- Raqs al-Janub (Orchestra and Takht).
- Sama’i Nahawand (String Orchestra and Takht).
- Longa to Marcel (Orchestra and Takht).
- Manfa (Orchestra and Takht).
- Your House (Orchestra and Takht).
- Your House, On a Different Day (Orchestra and Takht).

Songs

- Fi al Hara al Qadimaih / In the Old Neighborhood. 1992
- A Letter From a Mother to Her Son. (Voice, Bass Clarinet, Double Bass, Flute, Vintage Piano, and Drum Set), 2021.
- Ansar 3. 2020
- ʿIli al-Muj. (Being Peace album). 2008.
- Tghayyart al-Ayyām. (Being Peace album). 2008.
- Babda Min Jdid. 2022. (Voicem Guitar, Cajón, Percussion, Bass, and Keyboards).
- Balad. (voice, clarinet, flute, percussion, qanun, bass, accordion, string quartet). 2024.
- Min Zaman. 1992
- Gaza. 1990
- Idha al-Mar’u La Yarʿaka. (voice and takht) 2024.
- Yā Khāyif (Afraid). (Being Peace album). 2008.
- Khalili Ahabbik. 1995.
- Khalili Ya ʿAli. 1995. *Khudhnī (Take Me With You). (Being Peace album). 2008.
- Yallī Hajartū al-Dār (Those Who Left Home). (Being Peace album). 2008.
- 'al-Safih. (Being Peace album). 2008.
- Jerusalemite Love Song (String Quartet, Flute, Clarinet, Guitar, Piano, Bass, Percussion, 'Ud, Buzuq).
- 'Ali (String Quartet, Flute, Clarinet, Guitar, Piano, Bass, Percussion, 'Ud, Buzuq).
- I Remember This Place (String Quartet, Flute, Clarinet, Guitar, Piano, Bass, Percussion, 'Ud, Buzuq).
- I Remember This Place Too (Flute, Piano, Bass, Percussion).
- Yā Ẓarīf al-Ṭūl (Oh, The Tall One ). (Being Peace album).
- Ḥabbaitak Zghannūn (I Love You Little One) - A Palestinian Lullaby.
- Ḥabbaitik (I Loved You). (Being Peace album).
- Allah Yaʿṭī (God Gives). (Being Peace album).
- ʿĀziz ʿAla Nafsī (It Doesn’t Feel Right) (Being Peace album). 2008.
- al-Hubbu Ma Dama Maktuman (voice and takht); (al-Hallaj album). 2000.
- al-ʿAynu Tubsiru (voice and takht); (al-Hallaj album). 2000.
- al-'Ishq (voice and takht); (al-Hallaj album). 2000.
- Ana al-Ladhi (voice and takht); (al-Hallaj album). 2000.
- Khils al-Haki (No Words Left)
- Zakrini (Remind Me). (Voice and Piano). 2020.
- Sakanta Qalbi (voice and takht); (al-Hallaj album). 2000.
- Shay'un bi Qalbi (voice and takht); (al-Hallaj album). 2000.
- Sayyad. (voice and takht). 2000
- Taking a Walk. (Voice, Double Bass, Harmonica, Flute, Vintage Piano, Drum Set, Cajon, Timpani, String Quartet, Acoustic Guitar). 2021.
- Wama Wajadtu (voice and takht); (al-Hallaj album). 2000.
- Ya Kulla Kulli (voice and takht); (al-Hallaj album). 2000.
- Gaza Liberated Words Crumbled With Colors (voice, clarinet, flute, percussion, qanun, bass, accordion, string quartet). 2025.
- The Environment Song. 2000.
- High Sea Waves (Little Composers). 2000
- Ma Zilna Nuhghanni (The Dark Side of the Moon album)
- Khalili Ya ‘Ali (mixed ensemble)
- Marrat Bina(The Dark Side of the Moon album)
- Akhiru Marratin (The Dark Side of the Moon album)
- Khalf al-Tilal (The Dark Side of the Moon album)
- al-Janib al-Muẓlim li al-Qamar (The Dark Side of the Moon album) (Guitar and Voice)
