= Michael Boulos =

American business executive (born 1997)

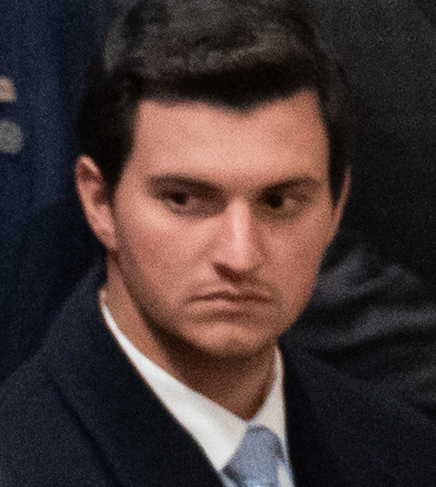
- Boulos in 2025
- Born: Michael Zohair Boulos; August 27, 1997 (age 29); Houston, Texas, U.S.
- Education: Regent's University London (BA); City, University of London (MSc)
- Occupation: Business executive
- Political party: Republican
- Spouse: Tiffany Trump (m. 2022)
- Children: 1
- Father: Massad Boulos
- Relatives: Fares Boulos (brother); Trump family (by marriage)

Michael Boulos (born August 27, 1997) is an American and Nigerian business executive. He is a son-in-law of Donald Trump, the 45th and 47th president of the United States through his marriage to Tiffany Trump. His father is American businessman and diplomat Massad Boulos.

== Early life and education ==
Born in Houston, Texas, U.S., Michael is the son of Massad Boulos, born in Lebanon, a business executive active in Nigeria, while his Burkina Faso-born, Lebanese mother Sarah Boulos, founded the Society for the Performing Arts in Nigeria (SPAN). At a young age, he and his family moved to Nigeria, where his family's businesses are based. He is the brother of Fares Boulos. They grew up in the city of Lagos, where he attended and graduated from the American International School of Lagos.

Boulos then moved to London, where he obtained his Bachelor of Arts in global business management from Regent's University London in 2018, and a master's degree in project management, finance, and risk at City, University of London in 2019.

== Personal life ==
In the summer of 2018, Boulos met Tiffany Trump, the fourth child of American president Donald Trump, at Lohan Beach House Mykonos, while he was in Greece. The pair began a relationship.

Since 2020, Boulos and Tiffany Trump have lived in Miami, Florida.

On January 19, 2021, Boulos and Trump officially announced their engagement, a day before her father left his office as president of the United States. Boulos and Trump married in 2022. She gave birth to their first child on May 15, 2025.

In July 2025, Boulos and Trump cruised the French Riviera aboard the Phoenix 2, one of the largest superyachts, owned by the billionaire Turkish oil traders Ercument Bayegan and his wife, Ruya Bayegan (who owns the energy company, BGN International).

At a state dinner, at Windsor Castle, by King Charles III, during the 2025 state visit by Donald Trump to the United Kingdom, Boulos walked with Catherine, Princess of Wales.

== Career ==
Boulos worked for his cousin, Jimmy Frangi, in international yacht brokerage.
