= Mikaella Boulos =

Lebanese actor

Mikaella Boulos (born 8 April 1992 Beirut, Lebanon) is a Greco-Cypriot-Lebanese actress and architect. She is known for her role as Dia in the Lebanese comedy series "Aayle A Fared Mayle", and film "Madame Bambino".

Boulos received her Bachelor of Architecture degree from Notre Dame University - Zouk Mosbeh in 2016. In 2017, she started her own architectural business, with her partner Rabih Jrab. The couple married on 8 September 2017.

== Filmography ==
| Year | Title | Role | Description |
|---|---|---|---|
| 2007 | Aayle A Fared Mayle Season 1 | Dia | Comedy Series on LBC |
| 2008 | Madame Bambino | Dia | Cinema/Film for 6 months |
| 2010 | Aayle A Fared Mayle Season 2 | Dia | Comedy Series on LBC |
| 2012 | Aayle A Fared Mayle Season 3 | Dia | Comedy Series on LBC |
| 2014 | Aayle A Fared Mayle Season 4 | Dia | Comedy Series on LBC |
| 2016 | Aayle A Fared Mayle Season 5 | Dia | Comedy Series on LBC |
