= Boulos Enterprises =

Nigerian motorcycle business

Boulos Enterprises is a Nigerian distribution, assembly, and trading company for motorcycles, power bikes, tricycles, and outboard motors. It was established by brothers Anthony and Gabriel Boulos. The company houses several notable brands such as Aprilia, Moto Guzzi, and Haojue. It is the sole importer and distributor of Suzuki in Nigeria.

== History ==
The Boulos' history began in Lagos, at a store that sold jewelry and other small articles to the upper-middle class. The jewelry business was managed by their father, George Boulos, a Lebanese goldsmith who emigrated to Nigeria in 1936. George developed good relationships with his clients which proved to benefit the business as it matured. In the mid-1950s, George's sons, Anthony and Gabriel, expanded the family business by importing Miele, Durkopp, and Göricke motorcycles. The company's profile expanded from there, leading to the incorporation of the company in 1964. By the end of the 1960s the firm had established a factory in Oregun, Lagos, which assembled Suzuki motorcycles from knock-down kits, thus becoming the first company in Nigeria to assemble motorcycles. Furthermore, the plant had the capacity to assemble 7,200 motorcycles per shift.

In 1979, when the government of Nigeria placed a ban on the importation of completely built motorcycles, the Boulos' profile enhanced, causing the firm to become the leading motorcycle seller in the country.

In 1975, the firm acquired land at the Ogba Industrial estate, beginning the process of manufacturing complete Suzuki motorcycles. The company also developed a distribution strategy which led to the creation of service centers across the country. These centers were capable of stocking spare parts as well as including a trained Suzuki mechanic at each location.

In 1987, the company established Bel Impex Limited, a tissue paper manufacture which is no longer part of Boulos Enterprises.

Between 2010 and 2016, Boulos Enterprises represented Piaggio India while partially assembling tricycles in the country.
