= American International School of Lagos =

American international school in Lagos, Nigeria

Location
- Lagos; Nigeria; 6.4379°N 3.4346°E

Information
- Established: 1964; 62 years ago
- Director: Tom Pado (Head of School)
- Age range: 3–18
- Campus type: Open
- Colors: Red, White, Blue, Purple, Green, Orange
- Team name: Eagles
- Tuition: US$28,049 (middle school); US$32,165 (high school)
- Website: www.aislagos.org

American International School of Lagos (AISL) is an American international school in Lagos, Nigeria serving preschool to grade 12. The school was founded in 1964. The Victoria Island campus, located on 2.4 hectares (6 acres) of land leased from the government, opened in 1981.

== Student body ==
AISL's student population consists of 600+ students of whom approximately 30% are Americans. Students from India, United Kingdom, Nigeria, Canada, South Africa, Israel, Lebanon, and the Netherlands all make up significant portions of the student population while the balance consists of students from over 50 countries.

== See also ==
- List of schools in Lagos
