= 2025 Donald Trump Gaza Strip takeover proposal =

Gaza Reconstitution, Economic Acceleration and Transformation Trust
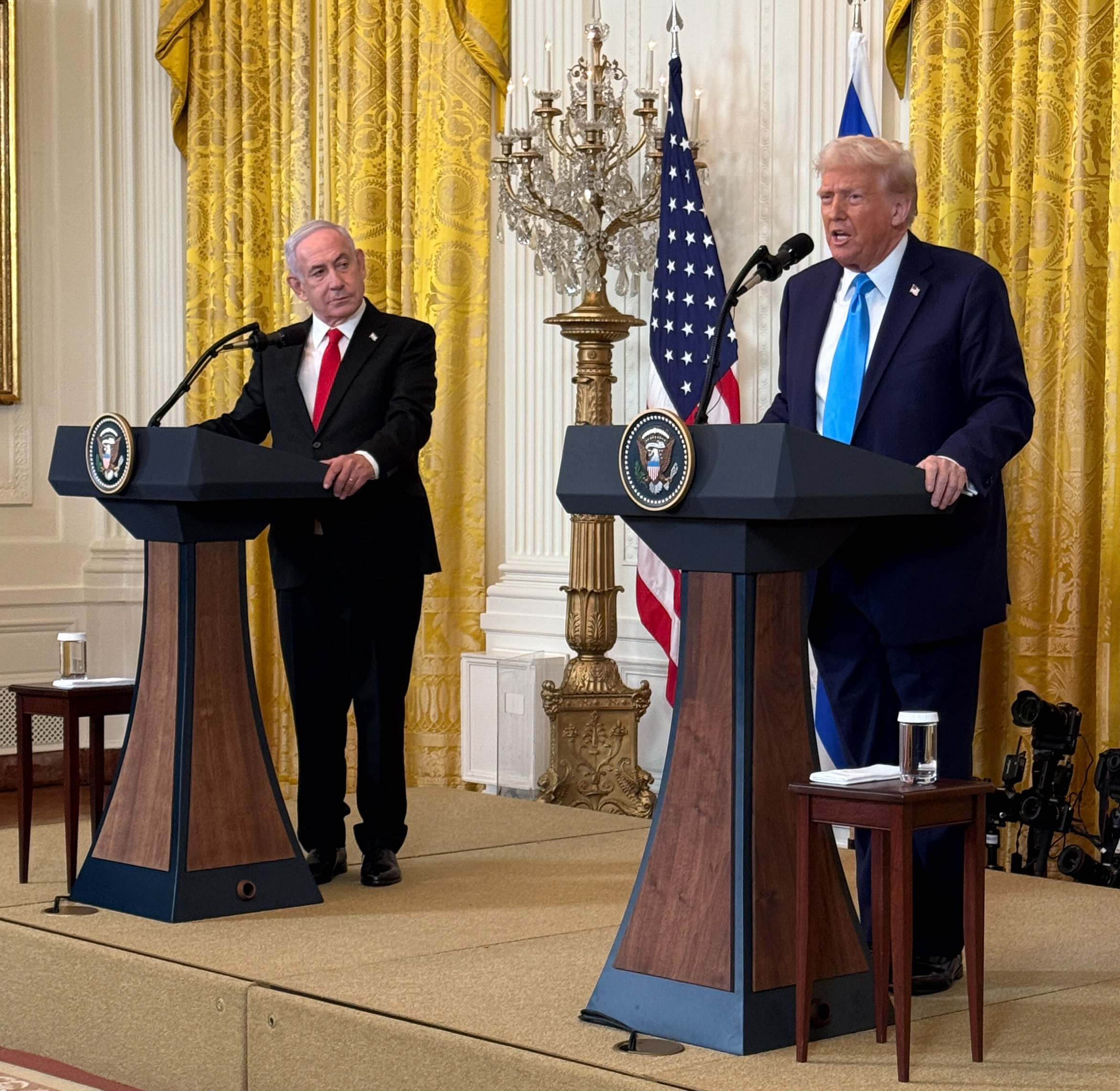
- Trump announcing the proposal during the press conference between him and Netanyahu (left)
- Context: October 7 attacks; Gaza war hostage crisis; Gaza war
- Drafted: February 2025
- Mediators: United States
- Parties: Hamas; Israel

The February 4, 2025, press conference where Trump announced the proposal

On February 4, 2025, United States president Donald Trump proposed a US takeover of the Gaza Strip and the relocation of its Palestinian inhabitants. Officially known as the Gaza Reconstitution, Economic Acceleration and Transformation Trust (or GREAT Trust), the proposal was announced by Trump during a press conference between him and Israeli prime minister Benjamin Netanyahu, and occurred during a ceasefire in the Gaza war, fought between Israel and Hamas-led Palestinian militants. Trump expressed his vision to redevelop the territory into the "Riviera of the Middle East".

The proposal called for the forced displacement of approximately two million Palestinians to neighboring lands, and would also have required the removal of over 50 million tonnes of debris and unexploded ordnance. When asked how the territory would be acquired, Trump claimed the US would "take it". The proposal received negative receptions from several nations and organizations, contrasting with strong support from Netanyahu.

== Background ==
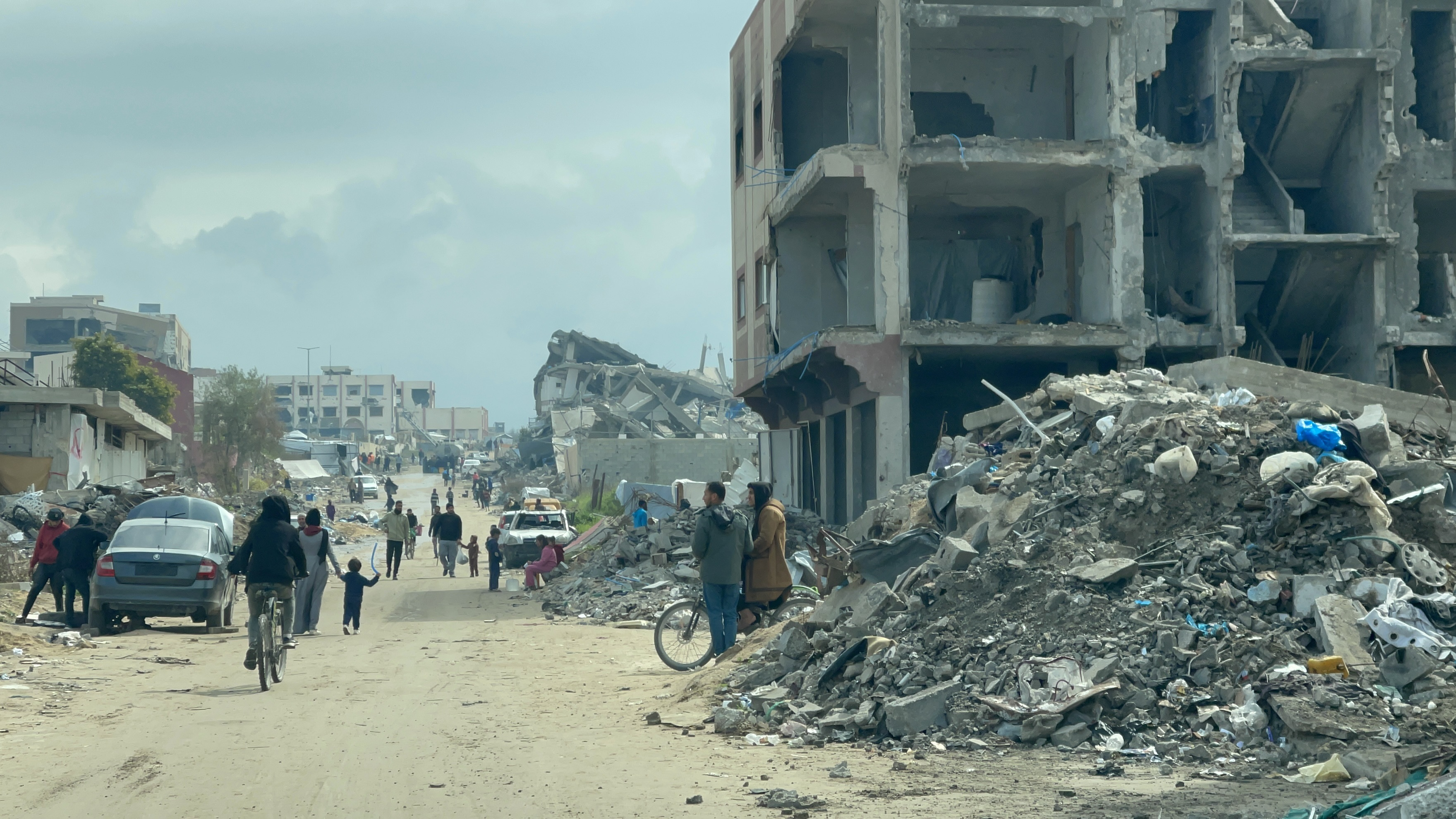
Palestinians in the ruins of Gaza in February 2025

The Gaza Strip, now a part of the State of Palestine, has previously been under Ottoman, British, and Egyptian control. Israel directly occupied the entirety of Gaza from 1967 to 1993, when the Palestinian Authority assumed civil control of most of the region. In 2005, Israel disengaged from the Gaza Strip, the same year the militant group Hamas won parliamentary elections in the region. Decades-long US diplomacy on Israel and the Palestinians have not produced successful resolutions in the conflict.

The Gaza Strip has seen a major scale of destruction since the beginning of the Gaza war in October 2023. Civilians who were internally displaced have been able to return to their homes since the ceasefire which began on 15 January 2025. The cost of rebuilding Gaza has been estimated to be in the tens of billions of dollars. Calls to displace Palestinians from Gaza mirror demands made by those in the Israeli far-right who have often called for ethnically cleansing Palestinian land to open it up to foreign settlement.

== Proposal ==
On 4 February 2025, Trump stated in a joint press conference with Netanyahu that the United States will "take over" and "own" the Gaza Strip, levelling and reconstructing the territory which will provide "unlimited amounts of jobs and housing for the people of the area". The plan would involve clearing rubble, dismantling weaponry and removing unexploded ordnance, which the US would be responsible for. The BBC reported that the amount of debris was over 50 million tonnes and that clearing the debris could take up to 21 years. Regarding the question of Palestinians inhabiting the territory and being currently displaced from it due to war, Trump stated that Gaza would instead be inhabited by "the world's people", whereas the Palestinians would be relocated to an unspecified "beautiful area", and will not be permitted to return to Gaza. Trump said that Gazans would be relocated to six "safe communities" a "little bit away" from Gaza.

On 5 February, members of Trump's administration walked back on the permanent resettlement rhetoric, contradicting Trump's comments the day before. Marco Rubio and Karoline Leavitt said the idea was to relocate Gazans for a temporary period of clearing rubble and rebuilding. Israeli prime minister Netanyahu said that he would support Trump's plan to have the Gazans return. On 9 February, Trump said that the US would buy Gaza and that it might be given to other Middle Eastern states to rebuild. On 10 February, Trump said the Gazans would not be allowed to return. On 11 February, he said that the US was not buying anything and would just "have" and "keep" Gaza. UN officials said that Trump's plan would essentially involve the ethnic cleansing of Gaza. The Hill reported that Trump was sending "mixed messages" about the fate of the Gazans and that he was not being clear about the long-term plan of displacement. Mike Waltz, national security adviser to Trump, suggested that Trump's proposal was an initial invitation to other regional players to bring solutions to the table. Marco Rubio similarly said that it was time for other regional powers to "step forward" and that "If the Arab countries have a better plan, then that’s great." Trump has requested that Arab governments like Egypt and Jordan take in the displaced Palestinian populations. Abdullah II of Jordan, meeting with Mahmoud Abbas prior, entered into talks with Trump about the plan but did not directly agree with or contradict the president, suggesting instead that Egypt would propose an alternative plan. It is reported that Trump's plan is based on a paper drawn up by economics professor Joseph Pelzman.

On 21 February 2025, after opposition from Arab states, Trump said he would "recommend" but not enforce his plan for the US takeover of Gaza and the resettlement of the Palestinian population. On 12 March 2025, Trump said that "nobody is expelling any Palestinians" from Gaza, which signaled a change from his previous stance. On 15 May 2025, during his presidential visit to Qatar, Trump reiterated his desire for the United States to take over the Gaza Strip and "make it a freedom zone".

According to "three sources familiar with the effort", Israel and the United States were interested in resettling Gazans to either Syria, Sudan, Morocco, or the separatist Somali regions of Puntland and Somaliland. Somalia and Sudan rejected the proposal, while Puntland and Somaliland expressed willingness to enter discussions on the matter in exchange for diplomatic recognition. In May 2025, reports emerged that the Trump administration was working on a plan to permanently relocate 1 million Gazans to Libya, while offering the release of around $30 billion in funds frozen by the US since the toppling of the regime of Muammar Gaddafi in exchange for Libyan authorities agreeing to the deal. In July, Netanyahu met with Trump and reiterated support for the plan of relocating Palestinians, saying it was "free choice" if Palestinians wanted to stay or leave. The US and Israel were working to identify countries for this plan.

=== AI-generated video ===
The AI-generated video posted on social media by Trump

On February 26, 2025, Trump posted an AI-generated video on social media. The clip depicts the Gaza Strip transformed into a luxury resort called "Trump Gaza" and features Trump and Israeli prime minister Benjamin Netanyahu sunbathing, children emerging from rubble into an upscale setting, a golden statue of Trump, scenes of bearded men dancing in bikinis, Trump standing with a belly dancer, and a figure resembling Elon Musk being showered with banknotes.

The video received criticism from Arabs and Muslims in the US and abroad, as well as from Republicans and conservatives on Truth Social and Instagram. It was not created by Trump; NBC News reported that it was first posted on social media on February 7 by a pro-Israel X account.

The creators of the video, Solo Avital and Ariel Vromen, later came out saying they did not know how Trump obtained it and criticized him for posting it without credit or permission. They described it as being created as satire and as a joke, rather than a political statement, and said they did not support Trump's "propaganda machine". The Economist suggested the video typifies a new form of political communication, where "knowingly absurd" AI-generated content conveys controversial ideas under the plausible deniability of humor.

== International law ==
Trump's proposal for Gaza is against international law; the forcible transfer of populations is prohibited. Members of Trump's administration have walked back on elements of the plan on a few occasions, although in one subsequent statement, Trump held firm to his original plan. On 21 February 2025, after opposition from Arab states, Trump said he would "recommend" but not enforce his plan for the American takeover of Gaza and the re-settlement of the Palestinian population. Arab League leaders met in March to create a counter proposal to Trump's plan, which was rejected by the US and Israel due to concerns about the proposed governance of postwar Gaza and other issues. The White House released a statement that Trump stood by his vision of Gaza without Hamas and welcomed additional talks. In July, Netanyahu met with Trump and reiterated support for the plan of relocating Palestinians, saying it was "free choice" if Palestinians wanted to stay or leave. The US and Israel were working to identify cooperating countries for the plan.

== Analysis ==
Quincy Institute's political scientist Annelle Sheline has argued that Trump's plan for Gaza would not only constitute ethnic cleansing, but would also destabilize the Middle East, since the displacement of Palestinians into Jordan would provoke a period of social upheaval that could topple the Jordanian monarchy and create an entirely new state in the region. She argued that if such an event were to take place, the Jordanian Muslim Brotherhood could seize control of the country. This view has been supported by Paul Piller (fellow at the Quincy Institute) who argued that the displacement of Palestinians into Jordan would effectively end the Jordanian-Israeli peace agreement of 1994 and risk the overthrow of the Jordanian monarchy. Oraib Rantawi, head of the Amman Al Quds Center for Political Studies, said the plan would affect Jordan's demography, identity, and security. Egyptian officials warned that the inflow of hundreds of thousands of Hamas militants into the Sinai border resulting from the plan would destabilize the region and put Egypt's peace agreement with Israel in jeopardy.

Also at the Quincy Institute, Rabwan Ahari has argued that Trump's proposal signals a clear and substantial departure from America having "even the pretense of supporting a two-state solution." They further argued that this plan amounted to a statement that Palestinian displacement was the goal of US policy surrounding the region.

Legal experts such as Janina Dill (co-director of the Oxford Institute for Ethics, Law and Armed Conflict) have weighed in on Trump's rationale, saying that the argument that it would benefit the people living in a territory is no justification (legal or otherwise) for seizing it by force. The Brookings Institute's Natan Sachs reiterates this point and adds that the proposal would be incredibly difficult and expensive to pull off, as well as risking "the implementation of the second phase of the ceasefire-hostage deal."

In Haaretz, Dahlia Scheindlin described the alleged plans as "bereft of logic or fact", and analysed the ways in which the far-right in Israel (and elsewhere) had seized on the plan, criticizing the "fuzzy, fake math" being used to suggest that Palestinians would support Trump's move. CNN's Stephen Collinson wrote that the plan would also be unpopular at home in the US, given that, in his words, Trump "partly owes his rise to a political base wearied by sending its sons and daughters to war in the post-9/11 era." fr:Dominique Vidal, a French expert on the Middle East, compared this proposal to the Madagascar Plan, a prelude to the Final Solution.

Al Jazeera said that Trump does not have the ability to carry out his plan whether legally, militarily, or diplomatically. Reuters said that it was not clear if Trump would move forward with the plan or if the proposal was an extreme negotiation tactic. Critics have said his first term was full of exaggerated foreign policy announcements, of which many were never implemented. Trump has said repeatedly that he wanted to end "ridiculous" wars and prevent the start of new ones. Ahmed Fouad Alkhatib, a Gazan analyst and Atlantic Council fellow, said that Trump's vision could not believably be considered an option and that it was transparently impossible. He wrote that Trump may be trying to pressure Arab nations into action through threatening to take over the Strip and communicating that he would become involved if there was not Arab initiative, including finance from Gulf nations. Alkhatib added that regardless of Trump's intentions, his statements have been damaging and have further contributed to the perception of the unhelpfulness of the United States.

== GREAT Trust ==
The Gaza Reconstitution, Economic Acceleration and Transformation (GREAT) Trust is a proposed post-war reconstruction initiative for the Gaza Strip, outlined in a 38-page prospectus circulated within the Trump administration. The plan, which was devised by some of the same individuals behind the Gaza Humanitarian Foundation (GHF), is for a US-led multilateral trusteeship to govern Gaza after the disarmament of Hamas, transitioning from initial US-Israel bilateral control to broader international involvement, with Israel retaining overarching security rights. Its core goals are stated as redesigning Gaza's layout, economy, and governance and integrating it into the India–Middle East–Europe Economic Corridor (IMEC).

Key components include 10 large projects under public-private partnerships (PPPs), such as rebuilding infrastructure (e.g., clearing unexploded ordnance and debris), highways and trams (e.g., the "MBS Ring" named after Saudi Crown Prince Mohammed bin Salman), an "Elon Musk Smart Manufacturing Zone" along the Gaza-Israel border, US-regulated data centers, a small port and airport, and luxury resorts with artificial islands.

The plan would entail the "voluntary" temporary relocation of Gaza's 2 million+ population during reconstruction, with incentives like $5,000 per person cash bonuses, rent and food subsidies, and the assumption that 25% (about 500,000 people) would leave permanently.

The plan has been criticized as a form of ethnic cleansing and forced displacement through a profit-driven exploitation. The Arab Center for Research and Policy Studies described it as a "blueprint for dispossession", excluding Palestinians from decision-making, imposing foreign trusteeship without consent, prioritizing Israeli security and masking genocide through profit schemes such as the Gaza Humanitarian Foundation, which has been linked to deaths at aid distribution centers.

== Reactions ==
=== Africa ===
- Somaliland: In February 2025, President Abdirahman Mohamed Abdullahi of Somaliland, which has international limited recognition, rejected the displacement of Palestinians amid rumors that Somaliland would be willing to accept Gazans in exchange for international recognition.

=== Middle East ===
- Palestine: Palestinian Authority president Mahmoud Abbas stated "We will not allow the rights of our people [...] to be infringed on" and affirmed that Gaza is "an integral part of the State of Palestine." Palestinian foreign minister Varsen Aghabekian reiterated the Palestinian Authority's de jure authority over the Gaza Strip, rejected the plan as "unacceptable", and called on other Western countries to do the same.
- Hamas: Hamas condemned Trump's plan and warned that such a plan would "put oil on the fire in the region".
- Houthis: Yemeni Houthi authorities released a statement saying that the plan represented "American arrogance" that will subsume all if it is met with "submission from the Arabs".
- Iran: Iran stated that "Iran does not agree with any displacement of Palestinians and has communicated this through various channels"
- Saudi Arabia: Saudi Arabia rejected the plan and said that it would "continue its relentless efforts to establish an independent Palestinian state with East Jerusalem as its capital, and will not establish diplomatic relations with Israel without that".

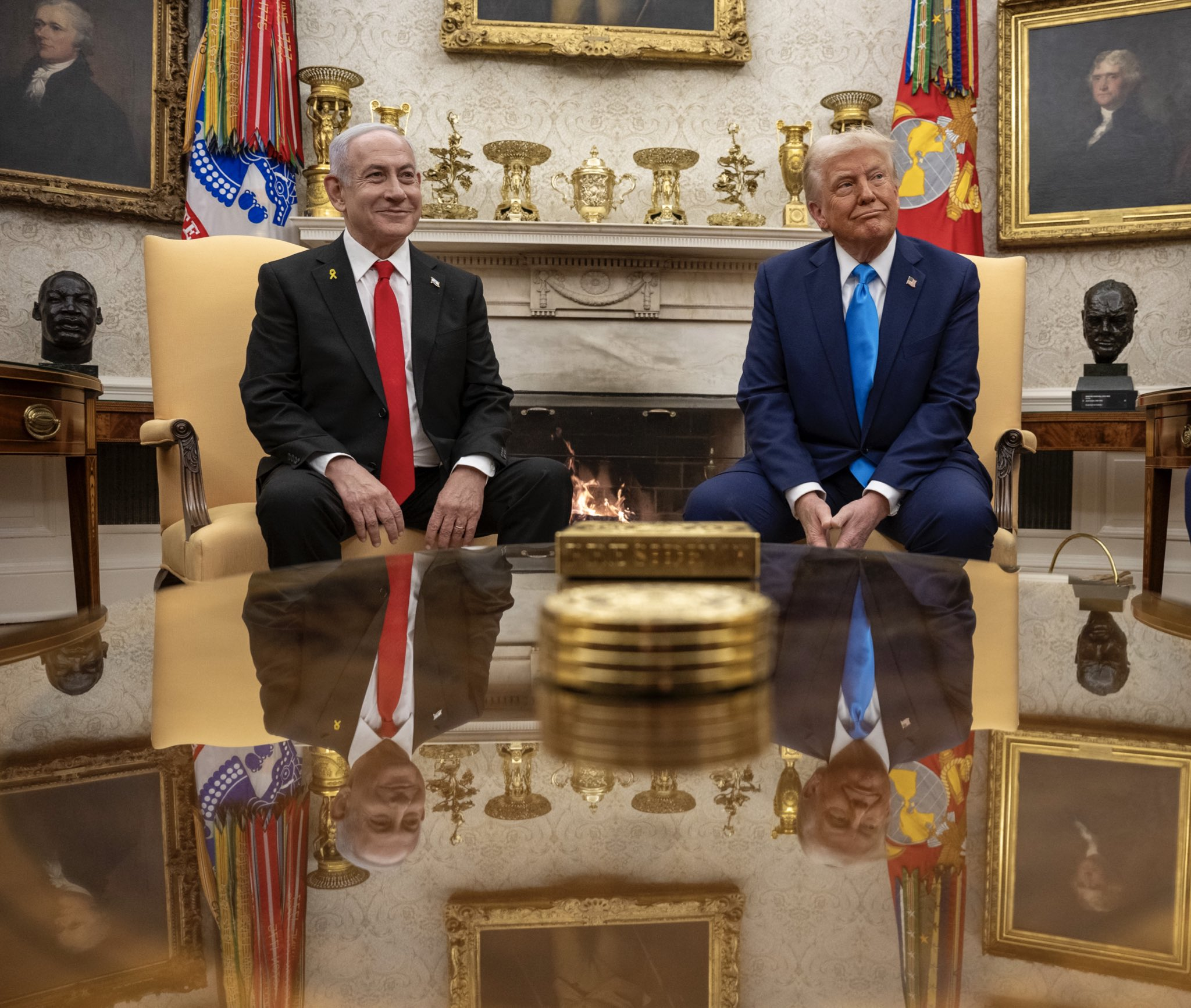
Trump and Israeli Prime Minister Benjamin Netanyahu at the White House on 4 February 2025

- Israel: Trump's plan was met with support in Israel with prime minister Benjamin Netanyahu saying that he was committed to the realization of the plan, rejecting the Palestinian Authority's or Hamas' governance of Gaza. Trump's proposal to resettle Palestinians from Gaza was supported by Netanyahu, Israeli Defense Minister Israel Katz, Israeli opposition leader Yair Lapid, and the majority of the Israeli public.
- Jordan: King Abdullah II of Jordan rejected President Trump's proposal for Jordan to absorb Palestinians living in Gaza. There are already more than 2 million Palestinian refugees in Jordan who fled due to the Arab–Israeli wars.
- Egypt: Egypt rejected American plans to annex Gaza and did not agree to take into Egypt displaced Palestinians. Instead, the Egyptian government responded by proposing a counter-offer of Egypt-led reconstruction of the strip. Egypt also signalled that the ethnic cleansing of Gaza would lead to the end of the Egypt–Israel peace treaty.
- Syria: Syrian president Ahmed al-Sharaa criticized Trump's plan, calling it a "serious crime that will ultimately fail." In an interview with The Rest Is Politics, al-Sharaa claimed that "no power can drive people from their land" and that "over 80 years of this conflict, all attempts to displace [Palestinians] have failed; those who left have regretted their decision. The Palestinian lesson that every generation has learned is the importance of holding on to their land."
- Turkey: Turkish president Erdogan rejected Trump's plan, highlighting that it would be a major threat to world peace. Hakan Fidan, the Turkish foreign minister called the plans unacceptable.
- United Arab Emirates: Emirati ambassador to the US Yousef Al-Otaiba stated that he sees "no other alternatives" to Trump's proposal.

=== North America ===
- United States: US president Donald Trump declared his intent to take over the Gaza Strip, relocate its Palestinian inhabitants, and redevelop it into the "Riviera of the Middle East", although members of Trump's administration walked back on elements of the plan.
  - The US's takeover of the Gaza Strip was supported by 15% of Americans, with 62% expressing opposition.
  - US Senator Rand Paul wrote, "We have no business contemplating yet another occupation to doom our treasure and spill our soldiers' blood."
  - Organizations such as Arab Americans for Trump and the Uncommitted National Movement criticized Trump's proposal.

=== Asia ===
- China: China rejected the American proposal and highlighted that "China has always believed that Palestinian rule is the basic principle of post-war governance in Gaza".
- North Korea: North Korea condemned the plan, stating that the plan amounted to "slaughter and robbery" and argued that the plan was evidence of America's "hegemonic, invasive ambition for world dominance".

=== Europe ===
- Germany: German Chancellor Olaf Scholz said that "Any resettlement plans, the idea that the citizens of Gaza will be expelled from there to Egypt or Jordan, is unacceptable."
- Russia: Russia's foreign ministry said that Trump's remarks were "shocking" and would add to tensions in the region. A Kremlin spokesperson said that the Kremlin was waiting for more details on the plan.

=== International organizations ===
- United Nations: UN Secretary General Antonio Guterres said Gaza was an integral part of a future Palestinian state.
- Amnesty International's Agnès Callamard condemned Trump's plan to take over Gaza and forcibly relocate Palestinians, calling it "outrageous and shameful." She said it would be a war crime and urged the global community to reject it and uphold Palestinian rights.
- International Coordination of Revolutionary Parties and Organizations: The ICOR released a statement condemning Trump's Gaza plan saying that it would be tantamount to a new Nakba.
- Holy See: The Catholic Patriarch of Jerusalem, Pierbattista Pizzaballa, on July 21, 2025, stated that the majority in Gaza will remain there: “First of all, they don’t know where to go, but they also don’t want to leave, because their roots are there, their home is there—or rather, they had their home there—and they want to rebuild it there. The Pope has been very clear on this: no population transfers; there will be no 'rivieras' in Gaza”.

== Arab counter-proposal ==
On 21 February, the Arab leaders of Egypt, Jordan, Qatar, UAE, Saudi Arabia, Kuwait, and Bahrain met in Saudi Arabia to discuss the future of Gaza. Their goal was to be a "united front" and provide an alternative to Trump's plan. Ibrahim Dalalsha, director of a political research group in West Bank, said the process would be complex and that the greatest obstacle for the Arab leaders is to introduce a plan that is realistic and can be enforced on the Palestinian factions, while at the same time being a plan that the US and Israel could accept. Arab leaders planned to meet for a broader summit on 4 March in Cairo to find a plan for Gaza before their diplomats travel to Washington D.C. "within weeks" to meet with President Trump to present their counter plan.

=== March summit and Egyptian proposal ===
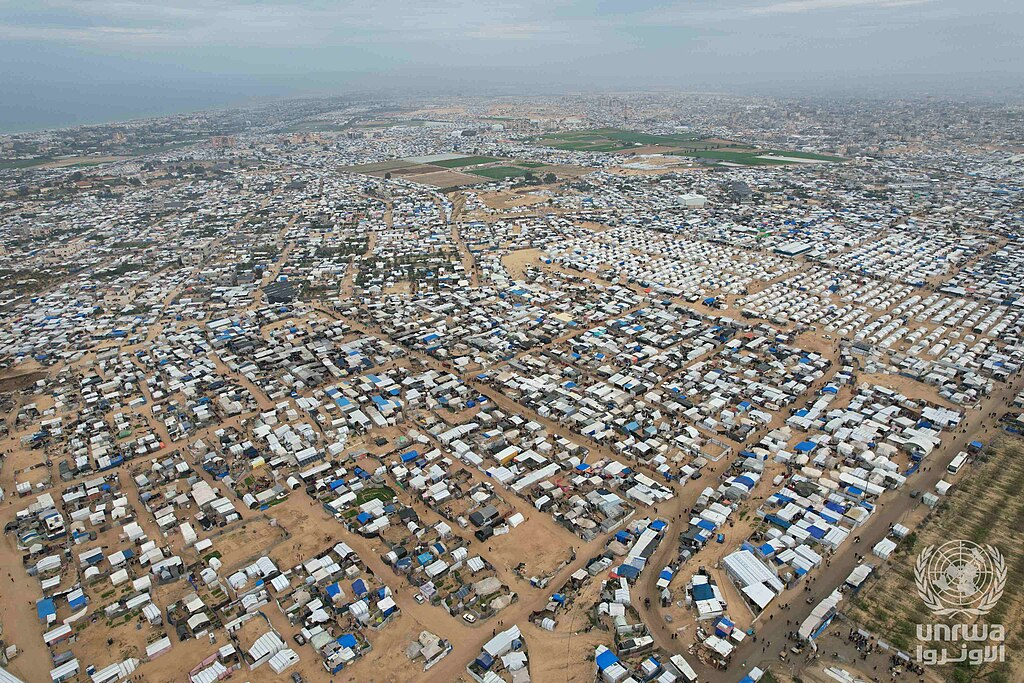
Aerial view of the Al-Mawasi area, where displaced Palestinians live in tents, January 2025

On 4 March, at the Extraordinary Arab Summit in Cairo on Developments in the Palestinian Issue, Arab leaders adopted a $53 billion plan proposed by Egypt that did not involve displacing Palestinians from the Strip. The plan was to create an interim committee of "independent, professional Palestinian technocrats" to govern Gaza to prepare for the Palestinian Authority’s return. Hamas said that it would not bring its own candidates to the proposed governing committee but that it would need to give its permission in regards to the committee’s tasks, members and agenda. Mahmoud Abbas said that he would be prepared to hold elections, which Hamas welcomed. The summit released an AI-enhanced presentation showing modern housing developments, as well as blueprints for resorts and attractions. The plan was to seek international funding. The plan outlines a six-month phase of recovery providing temporary housing for 1.5 million displaced Palestinians within seven sites in Gaza, followed by a two-stage reconstruction program: a two-year first stage of $20 billion and a 2.5 year second stage of $30 billion. The New York Times reported the funding for the plan remains unclear as Gulf states will be reluctant to invest in rebuilding Gaza only to see it destroyed again if violence returns.

The Israeli foreign ministry said the plan had "outdated" outlooks and rejected the plan's dependence on the Palestinian Authority, adding that Hamas would be given power by the plan. When asked if Trump supported the Arab leaders' plan, a White House spokesman said that the current Arab plan does not address that Gaza is "currently uninhabitable" for Palestinians to live in, due to the amount of debris and unexploded ordnance, adding that "President Trump stands by his vision to rebuild Gaza free from Hamas. We look forward to further talks to bring peace and prosperity to the region." The US special envoy Steve Witkoff said the plan had "compelling features", was a good first step, and they needed additional discussions. The plan was also endorsed by the Organisation of Islamic Cooperation and several European countries. On 12 March, Arab foreign ministers confirmed continuous consultations on Egypt's plan with the US special envoy.

== September 2025 proposal ==
During the 80th session of the UN General Assembly in September 2025, Trump met in New York a group of leaders of several Arab states to discuss the situation of the Gaza Strip. Reportedly, he presented them with a 21-point plan that called for ending the war and ending Hamas rule over the strip while establishing an international Arab military force to control the area for a period of three years. He also assured them that he would not allow Israel to annex the West Bank.

In late September 2025, Israeli and British media reported a proposal by former British prime minister Tony Blair for a Gaza International Transitional Authority to administer the Gaza Strip for a transitional period, before turning over administration to the Palestinian Authority.

== See also ==
- Options for a policy regarding Gaza's civilian population
- Proposed Israeli resettlement of the Gaza Strip
- Board of Peace
