= Tiffany Trump =

Daughter of Donald Trump (born 1993)

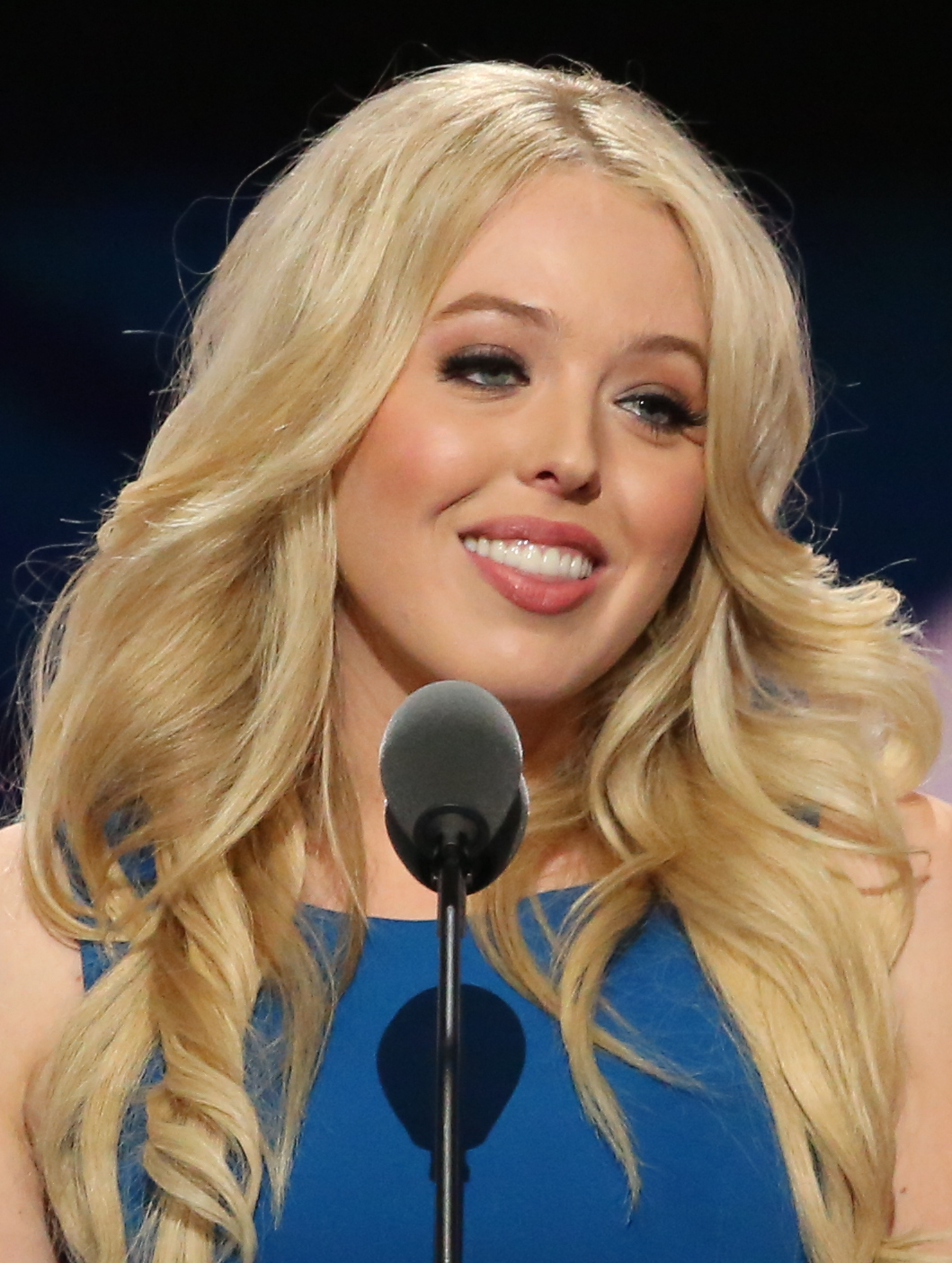
- Trump speaking at the 2016 Republican National Convention
- Born: Tiffany Ariana Trump; October 13, 1993 (age 33); West Palm Beach, Florida, U.S.
- Education: University of Pennsylvania (BA); Georgetown University (JD)
- Political party: Republican
- Spouse: Michael Boulos (m. 2022)
- Children: 1
- Parents: Donald Trump; Marla Maples
- Family: Trump family

Tiffany Ariana Trump (born October 13, 1993) is the fourth child of U.S. president Donald Trump and his only child with his second wife, Marla Maples.

Born in West Palm Beach, Florida, and primarily raised by her mother in California, Trump earned degrees from the University of Pennsylvania and Georgetown University Law Center. She briefly pursued music and fashion, and later became involved in politics by supporting her father's presidential campaigns in 2016, 2020, and 2024. In addition to her appearances at political events, she gained media attention for her social media presence.

== Early life and education ==
Tiffany Ariana Trump was born on October 13, 1993, at St. Mary's Medical Center in West Palm Beach, Florida, two months before her parents married. She is Donald Trump's only child with his second wife, actress and television personality Marla Maples. She was named after jeweler Tiffany & Co.; her father purchased the air rights above the company's Fifth Avenue flagship store in the 1980s while building Trump Tower next door. Her parents divorced in 1999 after being separated for two years. She was raised by her mother in California.

Trump has three elder half-siblings, Donald Jr., Ivanka and Eric, from her father's first wife, Ivana, and a younger half-brother, Barron, from Donald's third wife, Melania.

Trump attended Viewpoint School in Calabasas, California, graduating in 2012. She attended the University of Pennsylvania (her father's alma mater) and graduated in 2016 with a Bachelor of Arts degree in sociology with a concentration in law and society, and was a member of the Kappa Alpha Theta sorority. She then attended the Georgetown University Law Center in Washington, D.C., and earned a J.D. degree in May 2020.

== Career ==
In 2011, Trump released a music single called "Like a Bird". Trump later told The Oprah Winfrey Show that she was evaluating whether to take her music career "to the next level as a professional". In June 2015, Sprite posted a photo of himself and Trump sitting at a piano in front of a list of song titles labeled Tiffany Trump Tunes. The track list included nine songs, among them "Like a Bird".

In 2015, Trump worked as an intern for Vogue magazine and, in 2016, modeled for an Andrew Warren fashion show during New York Fashion Week.

== Father's presidential campaigns ==
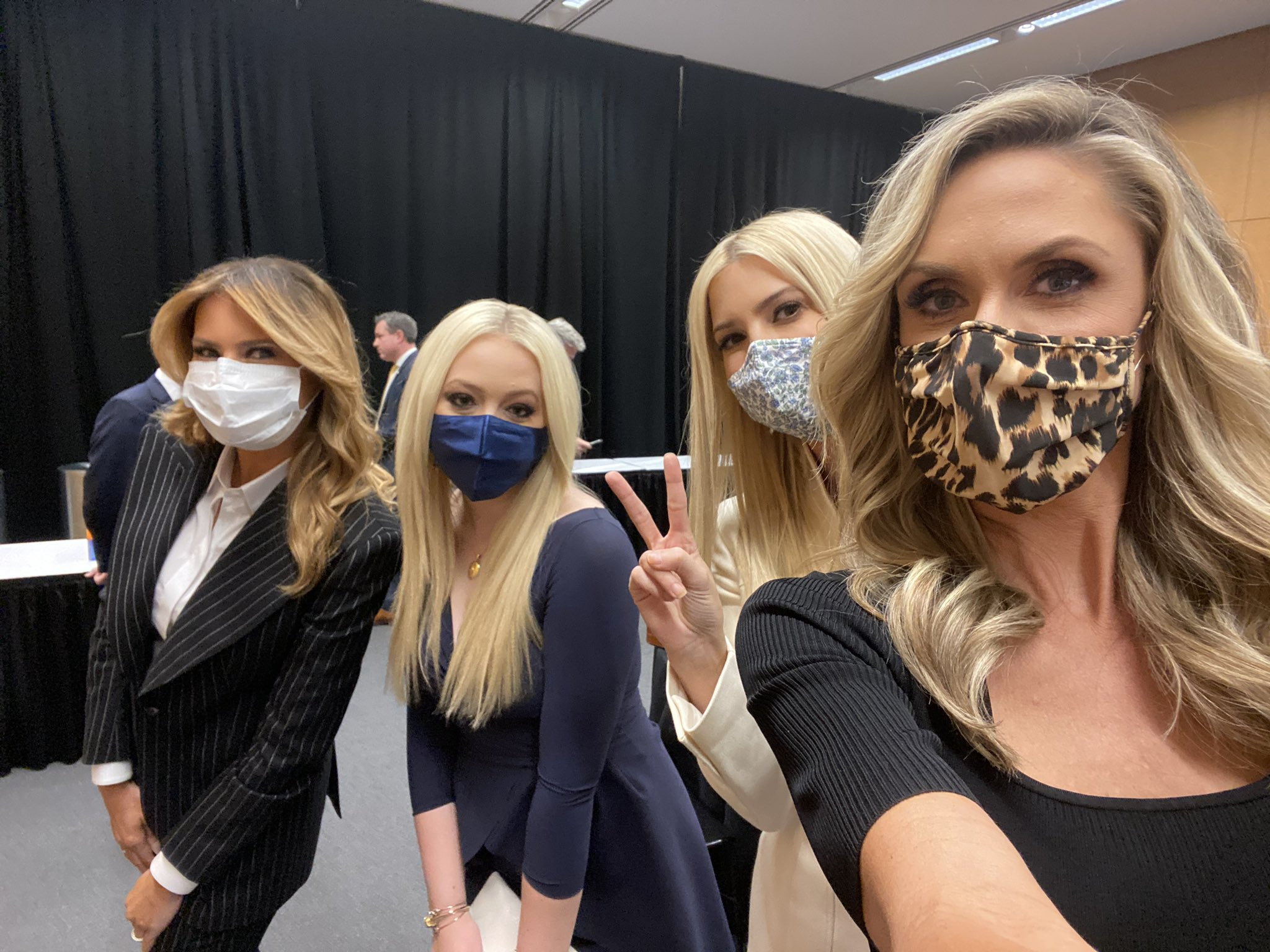
Tiffany along with her stepmother Melania, her sister Ivanka and sister-in-law Lara wearing masks during COVID-19

Trump made numerous appearances during her father's 2016 presidential campaign. She spoke at the 2016 Republican National Convention on the second night of the convention.

Trump again campaigned for her father in 2020, including speaking at the 2020 Republican National Convention. She spoke at several in-person campaign events in the weeks before the election. Trump campaigned at a Trump Pride event in Tampa, Florida in October 2020 alongside Richard Grenell. Them criticized the speech for failing to address LGBTQ issues; Vanity Fair noted her omission in the "T" for transgender people in "LGBTQ".

Trump appeared in person for her father during a speech at Mar-a-Lago following his first indictment in 2023.

== Personal life ==
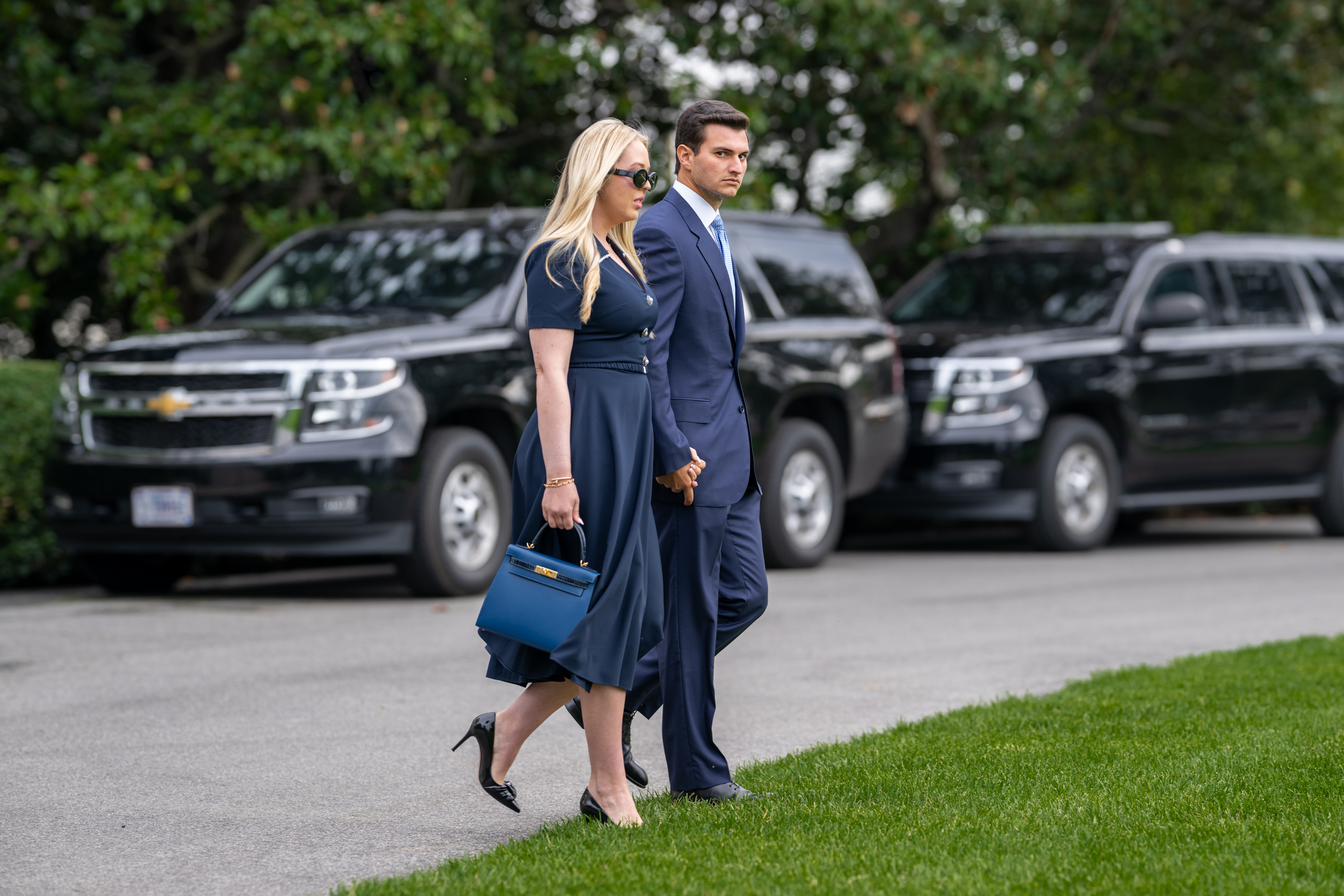
Tiffany with her husband Michael Boulos

In summer 2018, while on vacation in Greece with the actress Lindsay Lohan, Trump met Michael Boulos, a Lebanese-American business executive. The pair began a relationship and were married on November 12, 2022, at Mar-a-Lago in Palm Beach, Florida. On May 15, 2025, Trump announced on Instagram the birth of their first child, a son named Alexander Trump Boulos.

Trump is a frequent poster on Instagram, where she had 1.9 million followers as of August 2026. Her Instagram posts have frequently included photographs of herself with friends or with descendants of famous parents or grandparents, such as Kyra Kennedy, Gaïa Jacquet-Matisse, Reya Benitez, Ezra J. William, and EJ Johnson. The group has been named the "rich kids of Instagram" by the New York Post and the "Snap Pack" by The New York Times and New York magazine.

== See also ==
- List of Kappa Alpha Theta sisters
- List of children of presidents of the United States
