= Last Week Tonight with John Oliver season 4 =

2017 television series season

Last Week Tonight with John Oliver
- Season 4
- Promotional poster for the season
- No. of episodes: 30

Release
- Original network: HBO
- Original release: February 12 – November 12, 2017

Season chronology
- ← Previous; Season 3

The fourth season of late-night talk and news satire television program Last Week Tonight with John Oliver originally aired between February 12 and November 12, 2017, on HBO in the United States. The season was produced by Avalon Television and Sixteen String Jack Productions; the executive producers were host John Oliver, Tim Carvell, and Liz Stanton, with Paul Pennolino as director. Last Week Tonight aired on Sundays at 11 pm, and had a total of 30 episodes. The season was generally well received, winning four Emmy Awards, one GLAAD Media Award, one TCA Award, and one WGA Award. The show continued to release the main stories of each broadcast on its YouTube channel after each episode aired.

== Production ==
Season four aired from February 12 to November 12, 2017. The season was produced by Avalon Television and Sixteen String Jack Productions; it aired on HBO in the United States at 11 pm on Sundays. Host John Oliver, Tim Carvell, and Liz Stanton were the executive producers on the season. Writers included Oliver, Carvell, Raquel D'Apice, Josh Gondelman, Dan Gurewitch, Geoff Haggerty, Jeff Maurer, Brian Parise, Scott Sherman, Ben Silva, Will Tracy, Jill Twiss, Seena Vali, and Juli Weiner. Paul Pennolino directed the season.

Promotional material for the season showed Oliver on the sets of other popular HBO shows at the time like Game of Thrones and Silicon Valley. Similar to the previous season, Oliver explained that coverage of the Trump presidency would remain minimal, as he expected other late-night shows to discuss immediate events. He continued that the in-depth pieces they were preparing did not concern "party politics"; however, Oliver clarified that Last Week Tonight would cover issues influenced by the Trump administration.

== Reception ==
=== Critical reception ===
The fourth season garnered an approval rating of 100% based on 6 reviews on the review aggregator site Rotten Tomatoes. Some critics described the show as necessary comic relief from the activities of the Trump administration, with Les Chappell writing in The A.V. Club, "Now that 2017 is proving to be just as bad ... we need Oliver's confusion and outrage to guide us more than ever." Others also praised the season's continued quality and thorough coverage of current events. Last Week Tonight was listed on Slant Magazine's list of the best shows of 2017.

=== Ratings ===
Season four of Last Week Tonight received notably good ratings in Canada: the season premiere had twice as many viewers in Canada than the previous season's first episode, despite airing simultaneously with many nightly news channels. Val Maloney writing in Media in Canada attributes this ratings spike to Canada's interest in the Trump presidency. In April 2024, HBO announced that the full episodes of seasons one through eight would be released on the Last Week Tonight YouTube channel.

=== Awards ===
For season four, Last Week Tonight received a rare second Peabody Award for "crafting a form that pushes both comedy and journalism in new, fresh, and publicly important directions". Last Week Tonight received nine Emmy nominations for season four, winning Outstanding Variety Talk Series, Outstanding Writing for a Variety Series, Outstanding Interactive Program, and Outstanding Picture Editing For Variety Programming for "Border Patrol". This season was the second in a row to receive the award for Outstanding Variety Talk Series, beating regular winners The Daily Show and The Colbert Report. Additionally, the show received Outstanding Talk Show Episode at the GLAAD Media Awards for "Australia Marriage Equality", the TCA Award for Outstanding Achievement in Sketch/Variety Shows, and the Writers Guild of America Award for Television: Comedy-Variety Talk Series.

== Episodes ==
No. overall	No. in season	Main segment	Original release date	U.S. viewers (millions)
90	1	False or misleading statements by Donald Trump	February 12, 2017	1.19
Main article: Trump vs. Truth; Guest: Actor Thomas Kopache
91	2	Vladimir Putin and Russia–United States relations	February 19, 2017	1.25
Guests: Singers and dancers Olivia Cipolla, Michaela Sprague, Nicole Medoro, Mishay Petronelli and Wesley Faucher
92	3	Affordable Care Act (Obamacare)	February 26, 2017	0.72
Other segment: Immigration policy of Donald Trump
93	4	Tibetan sovereignty debate and Human rights in Tibet	March 5, 2017	1.28
Other segment: Presidency of Donald Trump; Guests: 14th Dalai Lama
94	5	American Health Care Act	March 12, 2017	1.12
Other segments: International Women's Day, Wikileaks' March 2017 CIA disclosures Guests: Actors Thomas Kopache, Rob Corddry
95	6	United States federal budget	March 19, 2017	1.03
Other segments: Trump Tower wiretapping allegations, La Paz traffic zebras
96	7	Cannabis in the United States	April 2, 2017	1.18
Other segments: Trump Tower wiretapping allegations, United Kingdom invocation of Article 50 of the Treaty on European Union, La Paz traffic zebras Guest: Actor and puppeteer Noel MacNeal
97	8	Gerrymandering in the United States	April 9, 2017	1.15
Other segments: 2017 Shayrat missile strike, Bill O'Reilly sexual harassment lawsuits Guest: Actor Thomas Kopache
98	9	2017 French presidential election	April 16, 2017	1.18
Other segments: Sean Spicer Hitler–Assad controversy, political positions of Donald Trump, 2017 Nangarhar airstrike
99	10	Ivanka Trump and Jared Kushner	April 23, 2017	1.19
Other segments: 2017 North Korean missile tests, 2017 Turkish constitutional referendum Guest: Actor Gilbert Gottfried
100	11	Net neutrality in the United States	May 7, 2017	1.18
Main article: Net Neutrality II; Other segments: Eight Mile Style v New Zealand National Party, American Health Care Act of 2017
101	12	Kidney dialysis and DaVita Inc.	May 14, 2017	1.36
Other segments: Dismissal of James Comey, Bill English
102	13	Russian interference in the 2016 United States elections	May 21, 2017	1.42
Main article: Stupid Watergate; Other segments: Donald Trump's disclosure of classified information to Russia, Comey memos, Transportation Security Administration; Guests: Sesame Street penguins (performed by actors and puppeteers Pam Arciero, Tyler Bunch, Stephanie D'Abruzzo, and John Kennedy)
103	14	United States withdrawal from the Paris Agreement	June 4, 2017	1.22
Other segments: 2017 London Bridge attack, Russian interference in the 2016 United States elections
104	15	2017 United Kingdom general election and Brexit negotiations	June 11, 2017	1.24
Other segment: James Comey's testimony before Congress; Guest: Lord Buckethead
105	16	Coal mining in the United States and Bob Murray	June 18, 2017	1.28
Other segment: American Health Care Act of 2017; Guest: Actor and puppeteer Noel MacNeal Note: Within four days of airing of this episode, Bob Murray sued John Oliver for defamation over content presented in this episode. Murray eventually dropped his lawsuit two years later, which was the subject of the main segment of the November 10, 2019 episode.
106	17	Vaccine safety	June 25, 2017	1.31
Other segments: Lawsuit over coal segment from episode 105, possible existence of Trump–Comey recordings, Better Care Reconciliation Act of 2017
107	18	Local news and Sinclair Broadcast Group	July 2, 2017	1.14
Other segments: Donald Trump's Twitter comments about Mika Brzezinski, Trump administration's travel ban, the Hall of Presidents wax museum in Gettysburg; Guests: Actors Steve Schirripa, Campbell Scott, Anna Kendrick, Michael McKean, James Cromwell, and Laura Linney
108	19	Alex Jones and InfoWars	July 30, 2017	1.76
Other segments: Donald Trump administration's proposed transgender military ban, Anthony Scaramucci, Health Care Freedom Act of 2017; Guests: Actors Jack McBrayer, Gilbert Gottfried
109	20	United States Border Patrol	August 6, 2017	1.75
Other segments: Presidency of Donald Trump, Stephen Miller; Guests: Actor Will Arnett
110	21	2017 North Korea crisis	August 13, 2017	1.93
Other segment: Charlottesville car attack Guests: Musician "Weird Al" Yankovic
111	22	Nuclear waste	August 20, 2017	1.76
Other segments: Departure of Steve Bannon, Donald Trump's response to Charlottesville
112	23	Pardon of Joe Arpaio	September 10, 2017	0.97
Other segments: 2018 United States federal budget, rescinding of Deferred Action for Childhood Arrivals
113	24	Mergers and acquisitions	September 24, 2017	1.25
Other segments: 2017 NFL U.S. national anthem protest, Tom Price and Steven Mnuchin private jet scandals
114	25	Forensic identification	October 1, 2017	1.27
Other segments: Trump administration's tax reform proposal, aftermath of Hurricane Maria in Puerto Rico; Guests: Actors Josh Charles, Shannon Woodward, Josh Lucas, Samira Wiley, Robert John Burke
115	26	Confederate monuments and memorials	October 8, 2017	1.30
Other segments: Trump's response to Hurricane Maria's impact on Puerto Rico, Trump's feud with Rex Tillerson, Harvey Weinstein sexual abuse allegations Guest: TV host Stephen Colbert
116	27	2017 Equifax data breach	October 15, 2017	1.25
Other segments: Harvey Weinstein sexual abuse allegations, United States withdrawal from the Joint Comprehensive Plan of Action
117	28	National Flood Insurance Program	October 29, 2017	0.96
Other segments: Opioid epidemic, Roy Moore, Australian Marriage Law Postal Survey
118	29	Economic development incentives	November 5, 2017	1.01
Other segments: Mueller special counsel investigation, The Inspectors
119	30	Presidency of Donald Trump	November 12, 2017	1.20
Guests: Actors Thomas Kopache, Jack McBrayer, Tom Hanks, actor and puppeteer Noel MacNeal, Sesame Street penguins (performed by actors and puppeteers Ryan Dillon, Frankie Cordero, Peter Linz and Carmen Osbahr)
