= Last Week Tonight with John Oliver season 3 =

2016 television series season

Last Week Tonight with John Oliver
- Season 3
- Promotional poster for the season
- No. of episodes: 30

Release
- Original network: HBO
- Original release: February 14 – November 13, 2016

Season chronology
- ← Previous; Season 2 Next → Season 4

The third season of late-night talk and news satire television program Last Week Tonight with John Oliver originally aired between February 14, 2016, and November 13, 2016, on HBO in the United States. The season was produced by Avalon Television and Sixteen String Jack Productions; the executive producers were host John Oliver, Tim Carvell, and Liz Stanton, with Paul Pennolino as director.

Last Week Tonight aired on Sundays at 11 pm, and had a total of 30 episodes in season three. The season was generally well-received, winning four Emmy Awards, a Television Academy Honor, and one WGA Award. The show continued to release the main stories of each broadcast on its YouTube channel after each episode aired. Episodes in the season were credited with influencing US law and culture, a phenomenon dubbed the "John Oliver effect". Prominent instances include the main segment of episode three, titled "Donald Trump", which set an HBO viewership record and received widespread media attention; and the main segment of episode fourteen, about debt buyers, in which Oliver forgave almost $15 million in medical debt for 9,000 Americans.

== Production ==
Season three aired from February 14, 2016, to November 13, 2016. The season was produced by Avalon Television and Sixteen String Jack Productions; it aired on HBO in the United States at 11 pm on Sundays. Tim Carvell, John Oliver, and Liz Stanton were the executive producers on the season. Writers included Oliver, Carvell, Kevin Avery, Josh Gondelman, Dan Gurewitch, Geoff Haggerty, Jeff Maurer, Scott Sherman, Ben Silva, Will Tracy, Jill Twiss, and Juli Weiner. Paul Pennolino directed the season. The team also included researchers with journalistic backgrounds at The New York Times Magazine, ProPublica, CNN, and MSNBC.

Promotional material for the season displayed various negative blurbs criticizing Oliver or Last Week Tonight, like a quote from The Wall Street Journal that the show "makes people dumb". Continuing an idea from season two, Oliver said that the Last Week Tonight production team wanted to create longer segments that went more in-depth into topics. This differed from season one's idea of having many short segments to cover the week's news.

Last Week Tonight intentionally did not cover the 2016 United States presidential election in season two; Oliver called it a "massively overblown occasion" and explained that the team decided to concentrate on "other things that seemed a bit more relevant last year". At a press event for season three, Oliver explained that they may discuss the electoral processes and the candidates, but that the "daily dramas of the campaigns" would not be covered; he explained that "there’s plenty of other people who will do that". On the topic of then-Republican candidate Donald Trump, Oliver said that Last Week Tonight would not cover his campaigning, but expressed interest in discussing "what is happening underneath"; however, many episodes of season three contained segments about the election and Trump's campaign.

== Reception ==
=== Critical reception ===
The third season was generally well received. Critics continued to praise the show's comedic but still in-depth segments on current events. Variety commended Oliver's persona as host, describing him as having a "beautifully calibrated, extremely articulate rage". Some critics said that Oliver's quick humorous interjections had "lost its charm", according to The Daily Free Press, but others found that these quips were what made the show compelling. The season's third episode, "Donald Trump", received widespread media attention; many writers criticized the segment's satirizing of "Donald Drumpf", a spin on Trump's name using that of his ancestors, for being xenophobic.

=== Ratings ===
Last Week Tonight received an average 5.6 million viewers in season three, which HBO said was boosted by its digital streaming services. The show continued to release the main stories of episodes on the Last Week Tonight YouTube channel. "Donald Trump" set an HBO viewership record, according to a spokesperson from the network; a month after airing, it had 23.3 million views on YouTube, 62 million views on Facebook, and an average gross television audience of about 6 million, totaling about 86 million views. In April 2024, HBO announced that the full episodes of seasons one through eight would be released on the Last Week Tonight YouTube channel.

=== Awards ===
Last Week Tonight received eight Emmy Award nominations for season three, winning Outstanding Variety Talk Series, Outstanding Writing for a Variety Series, Outstanding Interactive Program, and Outstanding Picture Editing For Variety Programming for the segment "F*ck 2016" in episode thirty. After season three aired, Last Week Tonight received a Television Academy Honor for "[offering] an intellectually unique perspective mixed with the perfect balance of thoughtful jest". Additionally, Last Week Tonight received the Writers Guild of America Award for Television: Comedy-Variety Talk Series.

=== Influence ===
Coverage of an issue by Last Week Tonight has been credited with influencing US legislature and culture, a phenomenon dubbed the "John Oliver effect". Episode three of the season covered Donald Trump's career and 2016 presidential campaign. Immediately after airing, web searches for "Donald Drumpf" went viral. By March 1, the date on which the "Super Tuesday" primaries were held, Google Searches for "Donald Drumpf" had surpassed those for two of Trump's opponents. Other media also started reporting on Trump's "short fingers" shortly after the episode's broadcast, prompting Trump to write a Twitter post on March 1 which he stated that he was not aware of any mockery of his "short fingers". After Oliver promoted a Chrome extension that automatically replaced the word "Trump" with "Drumpf", multiple spinoff extensions were created; as a result of a spinoff extension, Wired magazine accidentally published multiple articles replacing Trump's name with the phrase "Someone with Tiny Hands". In addition, episode fourteen covered debt buying in the United States, a practice that Oliver criticized for allowing companies to manipulate people with extreme medical debt. At the end of the episode, the host personally bought almost $15 million in medical debt and forgave it for 9,000 Americans. The following year, a Reddit user claimed to have received a letter explaining that their debt had been paid off due to Oliver's philanthropy.

== Episodes ==
List of episodes in season three
No. overall	No. in season	Main segment	Original release date	U.S. viewers (millions)
60	1	Voter ID laws in the United States	February 14, 2016	1.02
Other segments: Death of Justice Antonin Scalia and the Thurmond Rule, food safety issues at Chipotle restaurants, New Zealand politician Steven Joyce getting hit in the face with a dildo Guests: Actor Andy Daly, director Peter Jackson
61	2	Abortion in the United States	February 21, 2016	0.92
Other segments: South Carolina Republican primary, 2016 United States Supreme Court vacancy, whitewashing in film
62	3	Donald Trump presidential campaign, 2016	February 28, 2016	0.70
Main article: Donald Trump (Last Week Tonight with John Oliver); Other segments: Egyptian economic crisis, US President Obama's attempts to close Guantanamo Bay
63	4	Special districts	March 6, 2016	0.82
Other segments: 2016 Republican Party presidential primaries, Gloria Steinem's interview with Lands' End
64	5	FBI–Apple encryption dispute	March 13, 2016	0.96
Other segments: 2016 United States presidential election, International Women's Day, Switzerland's Day of the Sick; Guests: Actors Rich Sommer, Jake Lacy, Eugene Mirman, and Michelle Trachtenberg
65	6	Trump wall	March 20, 2016	0.93
Main article: Border Wall (Last Week Tonight); Other segments: Merrick Garland Supreme Court nomination, Operation Car Wash
66	7	Campaign finance in the United States	April 3, 2016	0.95
Other segments: 2016 Nuclear Security Summit, Yankee Stadium seat pricing, CNBC anchor Joe Kernen's personal trainer Guest: US congressman Steve Israel
67	8	Credit score in the United States	April 10, 2016	0.91
Other segments: Panama Papers, Alabama Governor Robert J. Bentley's affair, Yankee Stadium seat pricing Guest: Cellist Yo-Yo Ma
68	9	Lead poisoning	April 17, 2016	0.85
Other segments: Direct Line with Vladimir Putin, UK Prime Minister David Cameron's involvement in the Panama Papers, Böhmermann affair Guests: Sesame Street characters
69	10	Puerto Rican government-debt crisis	April 24, 2016	1.34
Other segments: US President Obama's visits to Saudi Arabia and the United Kingdom; Guest: Actor and playwright Lin-Manuel Miranda
70	11	Scientific studies and science journalism	May 8, 2016	1.42
Other segments: Then-Filipino presidential candidate Rodrigo Duterte, 7th Congress of the Workers' Party of Korea, 2016 United States presidential election Guests: Actors Michael Torpey, H. Jon Benjamin, Peter Grosz, B. D. Wong, Sunita Mani
71	12	9-1-1	May 15, 2016	1.38
Other segments: Donald Trump 2016 presidential campaign, Elizabeth II filmed calling Chinese officials "very rude", Budweiser beer renaming to America Beer, Maine Governor Paul LePage; Guests: Actors Wendi McLendon-Covey, Rob Riggle
72	13	United States presidential primaries and caucuses	May 22, 2016	1.27
Other segments: Ramzan Kadyrov, Protests against Nicolás Maduro, Elbowgate, TV personality John McLaughlin
73	14	Debt buying industry	June 5, 2016	1.61
Other segments: Trump University, Wolf Blitzer
74	15	Retirement plans in the United States	June 12, 2016	1.21
Other segments: Social media in the 2016 United States presidential election Guests: Actors Billy Eichner, Kristin Chenoweth
75	16	Brexit referendum	June 19, 2016	1.44
Other segments: Gun politics in the United States, National Rifle Association of America
76	17	Doping in sports	June 26, 2016	1.53
Other segment: Aftermath of the Brexit referendum Guests: Actors Matt Walsh, Derek Klena, Campbell Scott
77	18	2016 Republican National Convention	July 24, 2016	1.09
Other segments: 2016 Democratic Party vice presidential candidate selection, Boris Johnson's appointment as UK Foreign Secretary, campaign songs Guests: Musicians Josh Groban, Usher, Cyndi Lauper, Dan Reynolds, Heart, Sheryl Crow, John Mellencamp, Michael Bolton
78	19	2016 Democratic National Convention	July 31, 2016	1.27
Other segments: Voter ID laws in the United States, 2016 Turkish purges, indoor tanning
79	20	News media in the United States	August 7, 2016	1.01
Other segment: 2016 Summer Olympics; Guests: Actors Bobby Cannavale, Rose Byrne, Dylan Baker, Brian Doyle-Murray, Suzanne Savoy, Mourn Zolfaghari, Mahershala Ali, Jason Sudeikis
80	21	Subprime lending	August 14, 2016	0.97
Other segments: 2016 United States presidential election, American Petroleum Institute lobbying Guests: Comedians Keegan-Michael Key, Bob Balaban
81	22	Charter schools in the United States	August 21, 2016	1.15
Other segments: Lochtegate, Donald Trump; Guest: Actor Will Arnett
82	23	Hillary Clinton's controversies and Donald Trump's controversies	September 25, 2016	0.88
Other segments: Shooting of Keith Lamont Scott, Wells Fargo cross-selling scandal
83	24	Police in the United States	October 2, 2016	1.10
Other segments: First United States presidential debate, Wells Fargo cross-selling scandal
84	25	Guantanamo Bay detention camp	October 9, 2016	1.08
Other segments: Donald Trump Access Hollywood tape, Ramzan Kadyrov
85	26	Jill Stein presidential campaign and Gary Johnson presidential campaign	October 16, 2016	1.34
Other segment: Donald Trump
86	27	Opioid epidemic in the United States	October 23, 2016	1.18
Other segments: Third presidential debate, Glenn Grothman
87	28	School segregation in the United States	October 30, 2016	1.03
Other segment: Hillary Clinton email controversy
88	29	Multi-level marketing	November 6, 2016	1.05
Other segment: 2016 United States elections Guest: TV personality Jaime Camil
89	30	2016 United States presidential election results	November 13, 2016	1.17
Main article: President-Elect Trump (Last Week Tonight); Other segments: 2016; Guests: Celebrities "Weird Al" Yankovic, Larry Wilmore, Amy Schumer, Larry David, Jeffrey Tambor, Billy Eichner, Nick Offerman, Megan Mullally, Kathy Griffin
