= Zebra crossing =

Type of pedestrian crossing

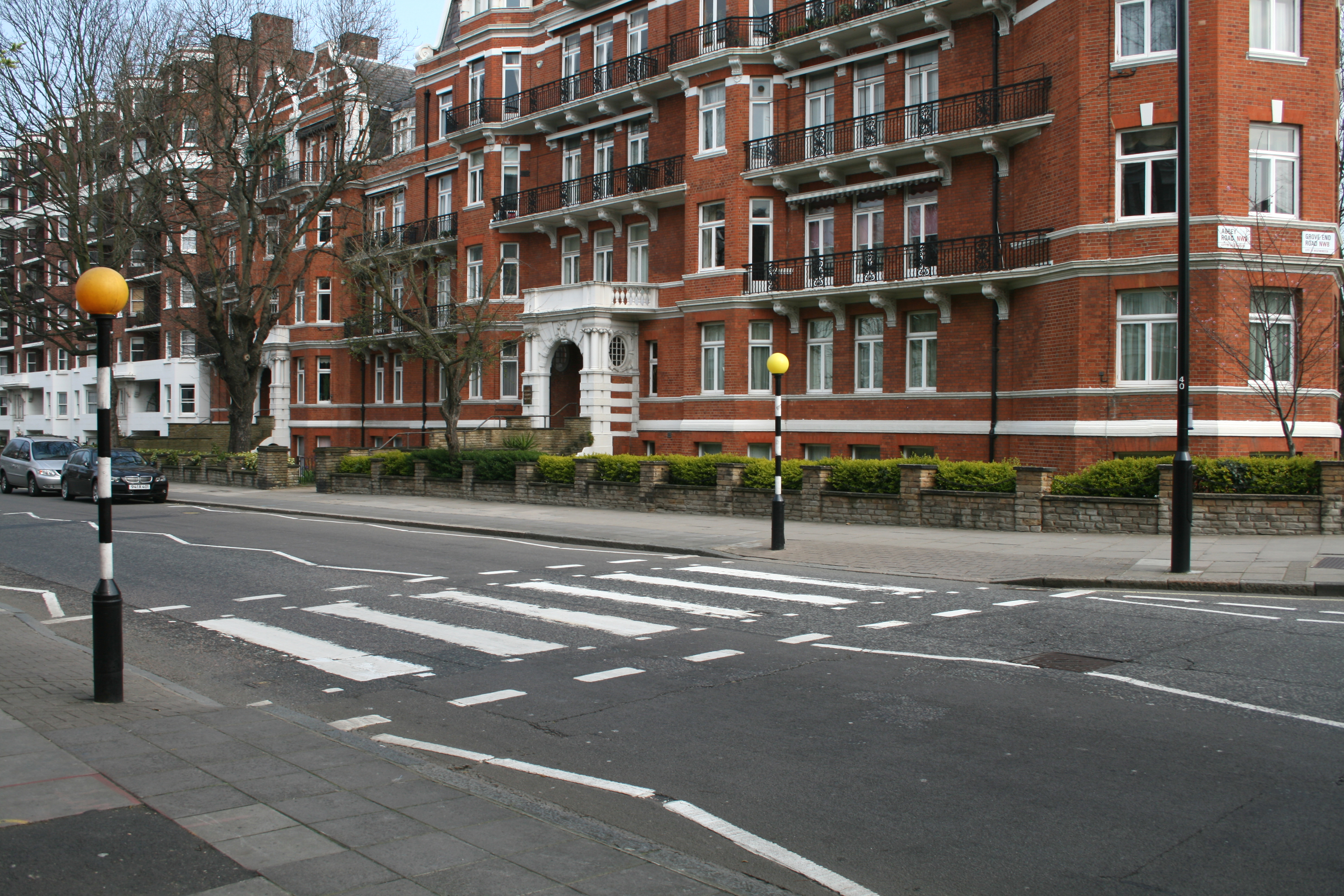
A zebra crossing with belisha beacons in Abbey Road, London. This crossing was featured on the cover of the album Abbey Road by The Beatles.

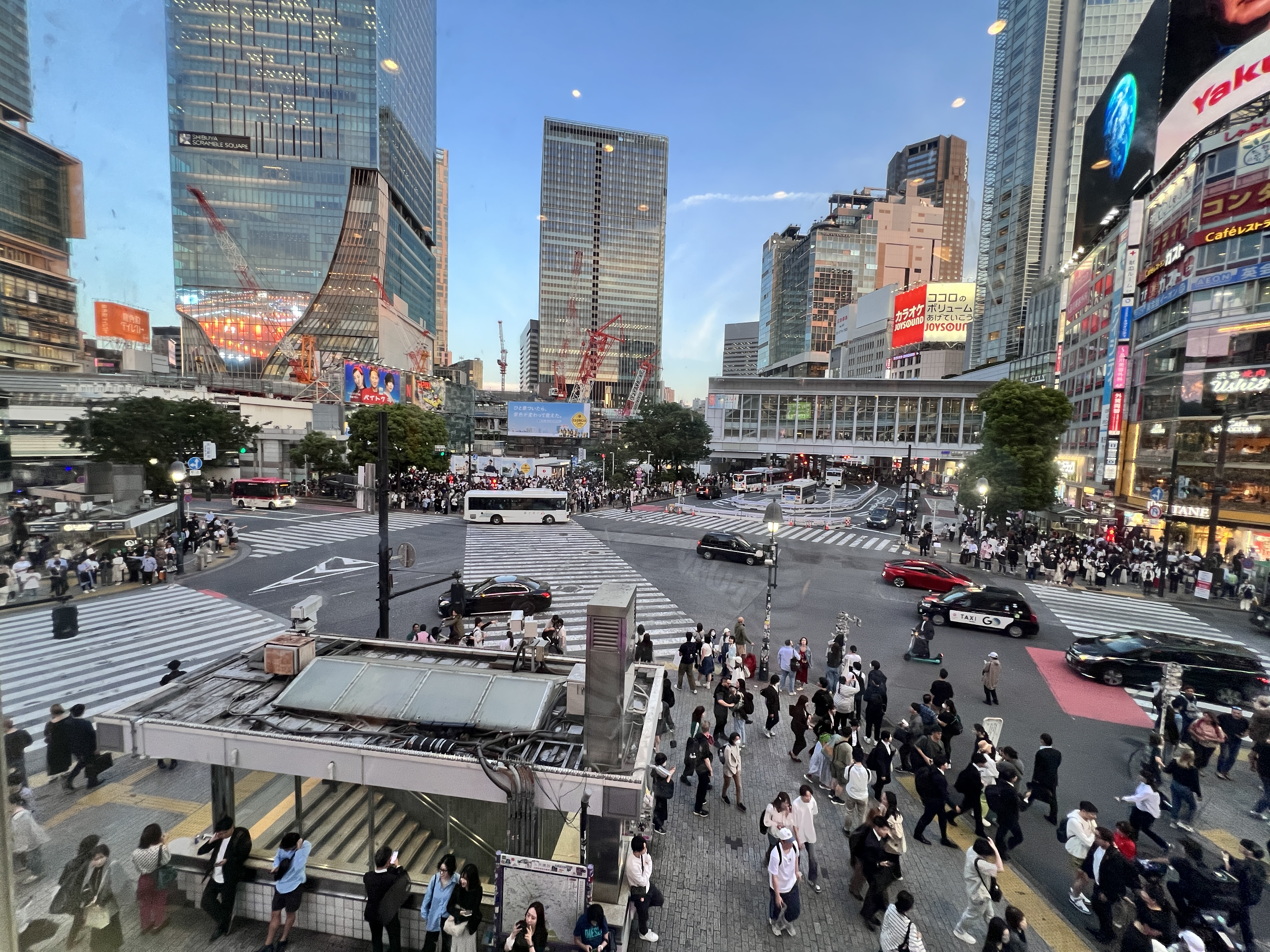
Streets of Shibuya Crossing in Tokyo with large zebra crossing area

A zebra crossing (British English) or a marked crosswalk (American English) is a pedestrian crossing marked with white stripes (zebra markings). Normally, pedestrians are afforded precedence over vehicular traffic, although the significance of the markings may vary by jurisdiction.

The first zebra crossing in the world was installed in Slough, United Kingdom, in 1951 to enhance pedestrian safety at new and already existing crossing points. Since then, zebra markings have come to be used internationally to denote pedestrian crossings, though many have been replaced by various types of signalised crossing due to safety concerns.

Terminology and usage of the markings varies by country. In the UK and other Commonwealth countries, they are usually called zebra crossings, as the stripes resemble the striped coat of a zebra. In the UK and some other European countries, zebra markings are only found at unsignalised, standalone crossings without traffic signals and must be accompanied with upright belisha beacons; in this context, the striped markings indicate absolute priority for pedestrians. In North America and in much of Continental Europe, they can be found at any type of crossing; in this context, zebra markings may or may not indicate pedestrian priority, and this priority may be dependent on traffic signals.

== History ==
=== Etymology ===
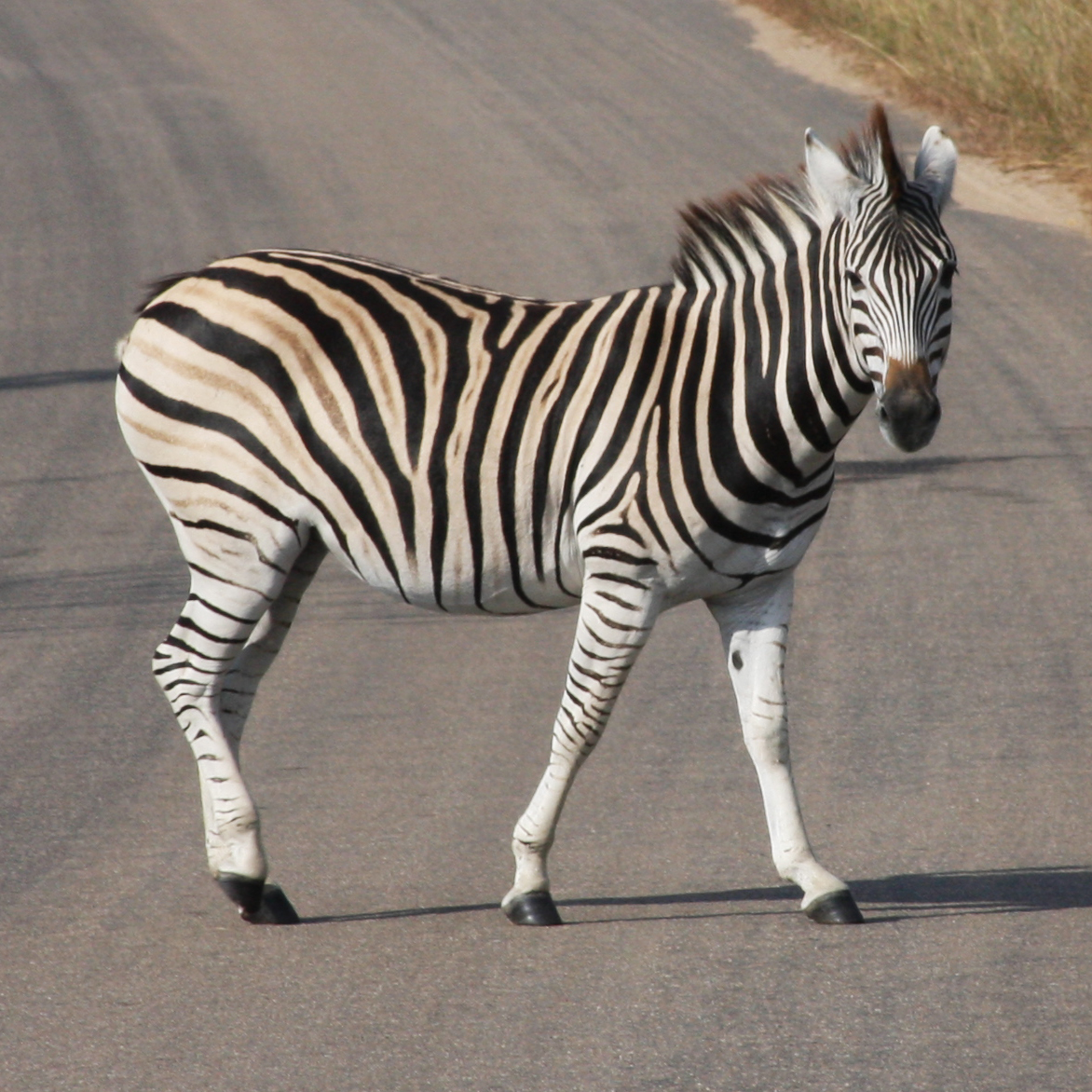
Zebra crossings are so named because their stripes resemble those of a zebra, though the origins of the link are disputed.

The origin of the zebra title is debated. It is generally attributed to British MP James Callaghan who, in 1948, visited the country's Transport and Road Research Laboratory which was working on a new idea for safe pedestrian crossings. On being shown a black and white design, Callaghan is said to have remarked that it resembled a zebra. Callaghan did not himself claim authorship of the term.

=== Introduction ===
The first zebra crossing was introduced on Slough High Street in the United Kingdom on 31 October 1951. Pedestrian crossings with Belisha beacons had been in use in the UK since the 1930s, originally introduced under section 18 of the Road Traffic Act 1934. The Belisha beacon is an upright crossing marking, still required at zebra and parallel crossings in the UK, named after the Minister of Transport in 1934, Leslie Hore-Belisha.

However, with an increase of car traffic, the effectiveness of the beacons was waning; both pedestrians and drivers were ignoring the crossing. From 1949 to 1951, the then-named Ministry of Transport experimented with designs to improve visibility and increase usage, until the familiar black and white stripes were introduced. The zebra crossing was then trialed at 1,000 experimental sites across the UK at this time. The zebra markings are credited to physicist and traffic engineer George Charlesworth, who was the first head of the traffic section at the Road Research Laboratory.

== Characteristics ==
The crossing is characterized by longitudinal stripes on the road, parallel to the flow of the traffic, alternately a light colour and a dark one. The similarity of these markings to those of a zebra gave rise to the crossing's name. The light colour is usually white and the dark colour may be painted – in which case black is typical – or left unpainted if the road surface itself is dark. The stripes are typically 40–60 cm (16–24 in) wide.

A small zebra crossing

Sometimes, zebra crossings are placed on a speed bump, meaning the zebra crossing is level with the pavement. This is done to make it safer for pedestrians to cross, since drivers need to slow down to go over the speed bump. However, this is more expensive than a traditional zebra crossing, and can impede the flow of traffic and response times for emergency vehicles, especially on roads with higher speed limits.

In the United Kingdom, the crossing is marked with Belisha beacons, which are flashing amber globes on black and white posts on each side of the road, named after Leslie Hore-Belisha, the Minister of Transport, who introduced them in 1934. Pedestrians have priority when they step onto the crossing: The Highway Code states that road traffic "MUST give way when a pedestrian has moved onto a crossing."

In other countries, such as the United States, zebra crossings are also used on pedestrian crossings controlled by traffic signals.

== Method of marking ==
The lines of a zebra crossing are commonly laid down by a road marking machine. Because the width of crossing lines is wider than other traffic lines, the marking shoe of a zebra cross marking machine is accordingly wider. The machine is hand pushed.

== Zebra crossings by country ==
=== United Kingdom ===
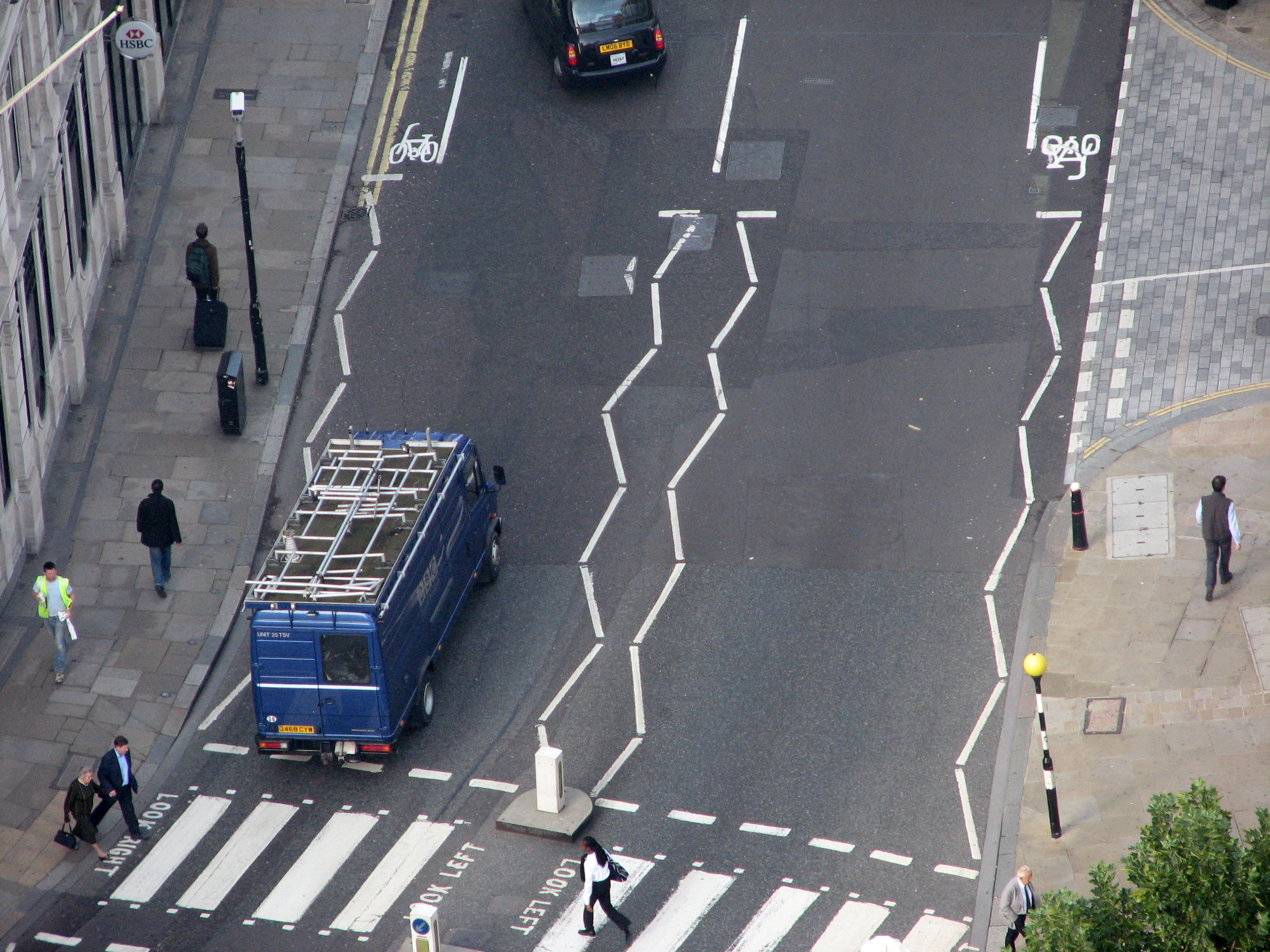
These zigzag lines indicate to United Kingdom motorists that they are approaching a pedestrian crossing.

In the United Kingdom, it is the law that all road users, including motorists, give way to pedestrians who have set foot on a zebra crossing. A fine of £100 and three licence penalty points is given to those failing to give way at the crossings. This penalty has attracted criticisms of leniency when compared to other countries which enforce fines of up to £2,000. For failing to give way at a zebra crossing patrolled by a school crossing patrol ("lollipop man/lady" as they are commonly called), however, the penalty rises to £1,000 and a minimum of three licence points, with the possibility even of disqualification. In the United Kingdom, motorists have to stop for a crossing patrol, even when it is not on a pedestrian crossing.

In the United Kingdom, lollipop men or women (school crossing patrols) frequently attend zebra crossings near schools, at the hours when schoolchildren arrive and leave. Their widely used nickname arose because of the warning sign they hold up as they stop traffic: the sign is a large round disc on a long pole and thus resembles a giant lollipop, although they were originally of a square design.

=== Continental Europe, Ireland, and the Middle East ===
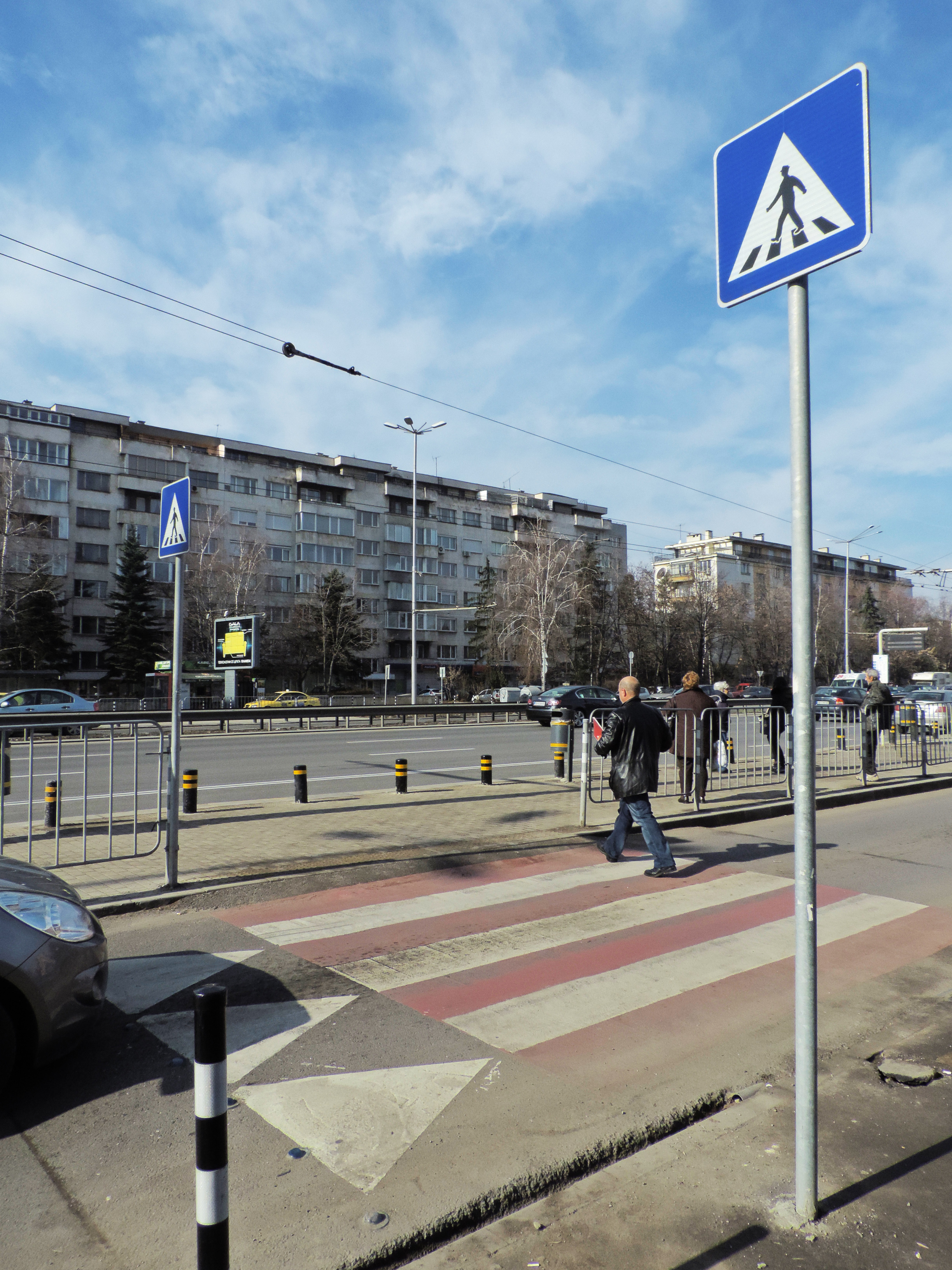
Red-and-white zebra crossing in Sofia, Bulgaria

In Germany, Scandinavia, and most other European countries, pedestrians have right of way if they are still on the kerb but about to enter the crossing.

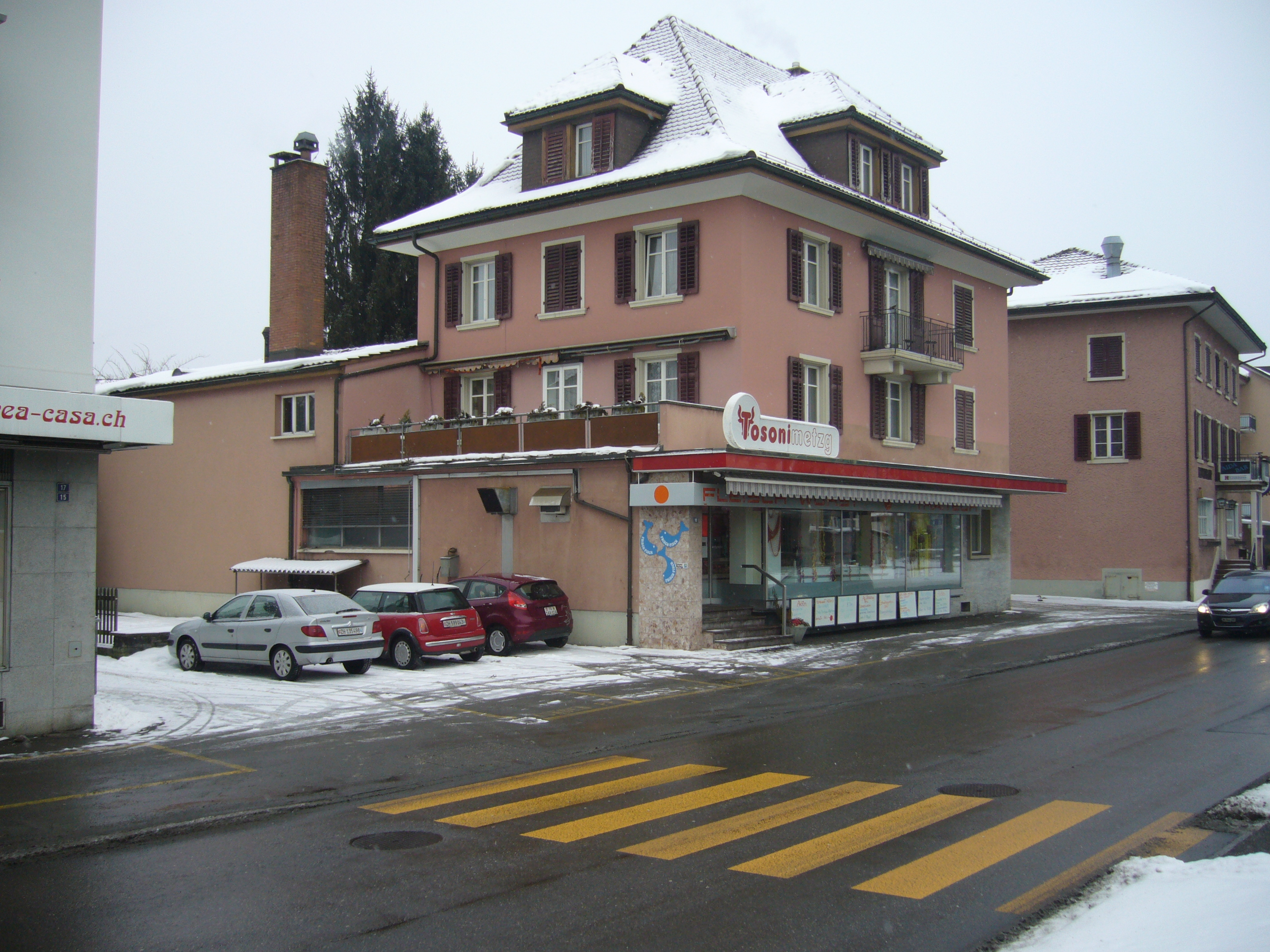
Yellow zebra crossing in Switzerland

In Switzerland yellow stripes are used for pedestrian crossings. Unlike a yellow tiger crossing in the UK, however, cyclists are required to dismount to cross.

In Portugal white stripes are used for regular, permanent crossings, while yellow stripes are used for temporary crossings, which are placed in construction sites where the original crossing has been obstructed. Newer roads are being equipped with red-and-white zebra crossings, to increase pedestrian safety and visibility.

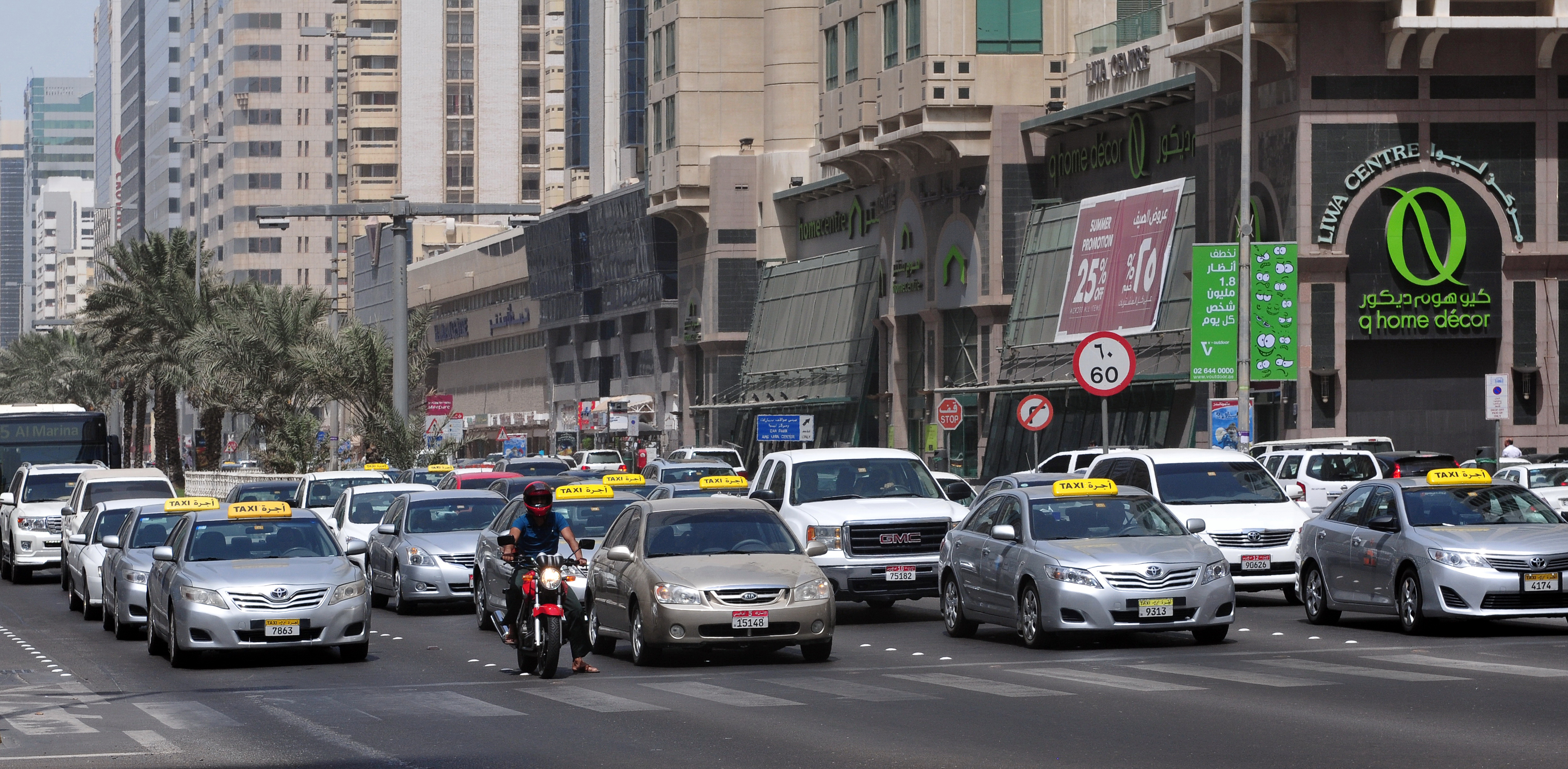
Zebra crossing in Abu Dhabi.

In Lebanon, striped crossings are the preferred pedestrian crossing type, though many other variations exist. Zebra crossings are painted mostly at signalised intersections and roundabouts. They are also widely used in school areas and stop sign regulated intersections. They provide priority and right of way to pedestrians under all circumstances.

=== North America ===
The different crosswalk styles used in the US

In North America, pedestrian crossings are almost exclusively called crosswalks, but depending on the marking style, they can have different names. Although zebra crossings exist in the US, the term is used to describe a type of diagonal crosswalk with two parallel lines painted over the stripes, similar but not identical to the ladder style. Instead, zebra crossings are called "continental crosswalks" and are the preferred style in many states because of its enhanced visibility compared to the other marking styles. In most areas of Canada, standard parallel lines markings are the preferred crosswalk style, except in Toronto where zebra markings are widely used.

=== Oceania ===
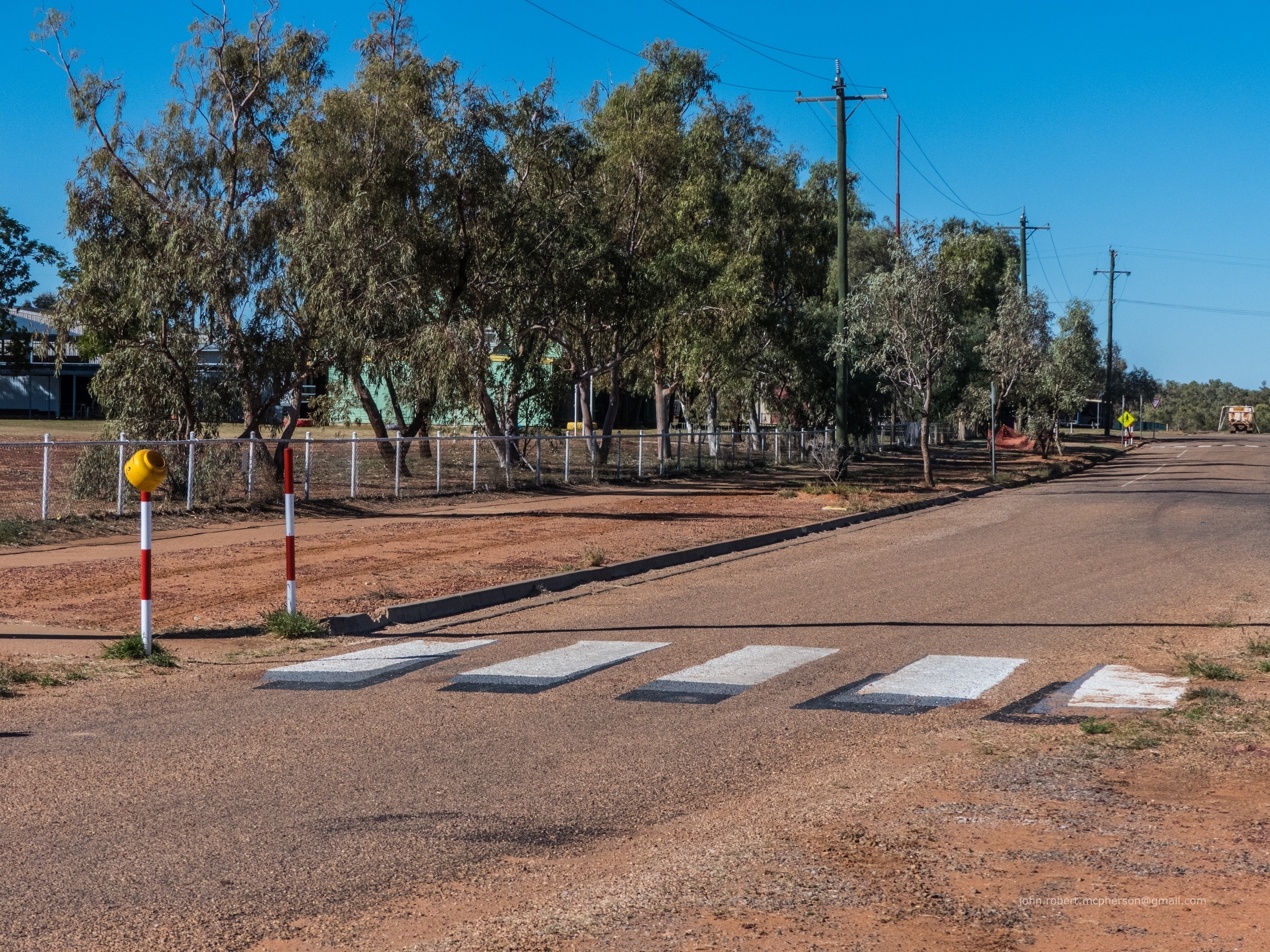
A three dimensional pedestrian crossing in Queensland, Australia

In New Zealand, motorists are required to give way to pedestrians. Pedestrians wishing to cross the road within 20 m (66 ft) of a crossing facility (which includes zebra crossings) must use a crossing facility.

In Australia, raised zebra crossings are sometimes called wombat crossings.

== Compliance ==
A 1998 Swedish study by A Várhelyi at Lund University investigated driver behavior at zebra crossings:

The frequency of giving way is 5%. Drivers do not observe the law concerning speed behaviour at the zebra crossing, as they do not "adapt the speed in such way that they do not endanger pedestrians who are already on, or are about to step onto the zebra crossing". In encounters, three out of four drivers maintain the same speed or accelerate and only one out of four slows down or brakes. These results indicate that maintained high speed (even exceeding the speed limit of 50 km hour-1) is the signal from the drivers that they do not intend to give way to the pedestrian at the zebra crossing. The conclusion is that encounters between cars and pedestrians at the zebra crossing are critical situations in which the driver has to be influenced before he reaches the decision zone at 50 to 40 m before the zebra crossing in order to prevent the 'signalling by speed' behaviour.

== Alternative designs ==
=== Cow crossing ===
The city of A Coruña in Galicia, Spain, has opted for spots rather than stripes at a pedestrian crossing, resembling a Friesian cow instead of a zebra. The reason for this option is to recognise the importance of the animal for the region's farming.

=== Tiger and parallel crossings ===
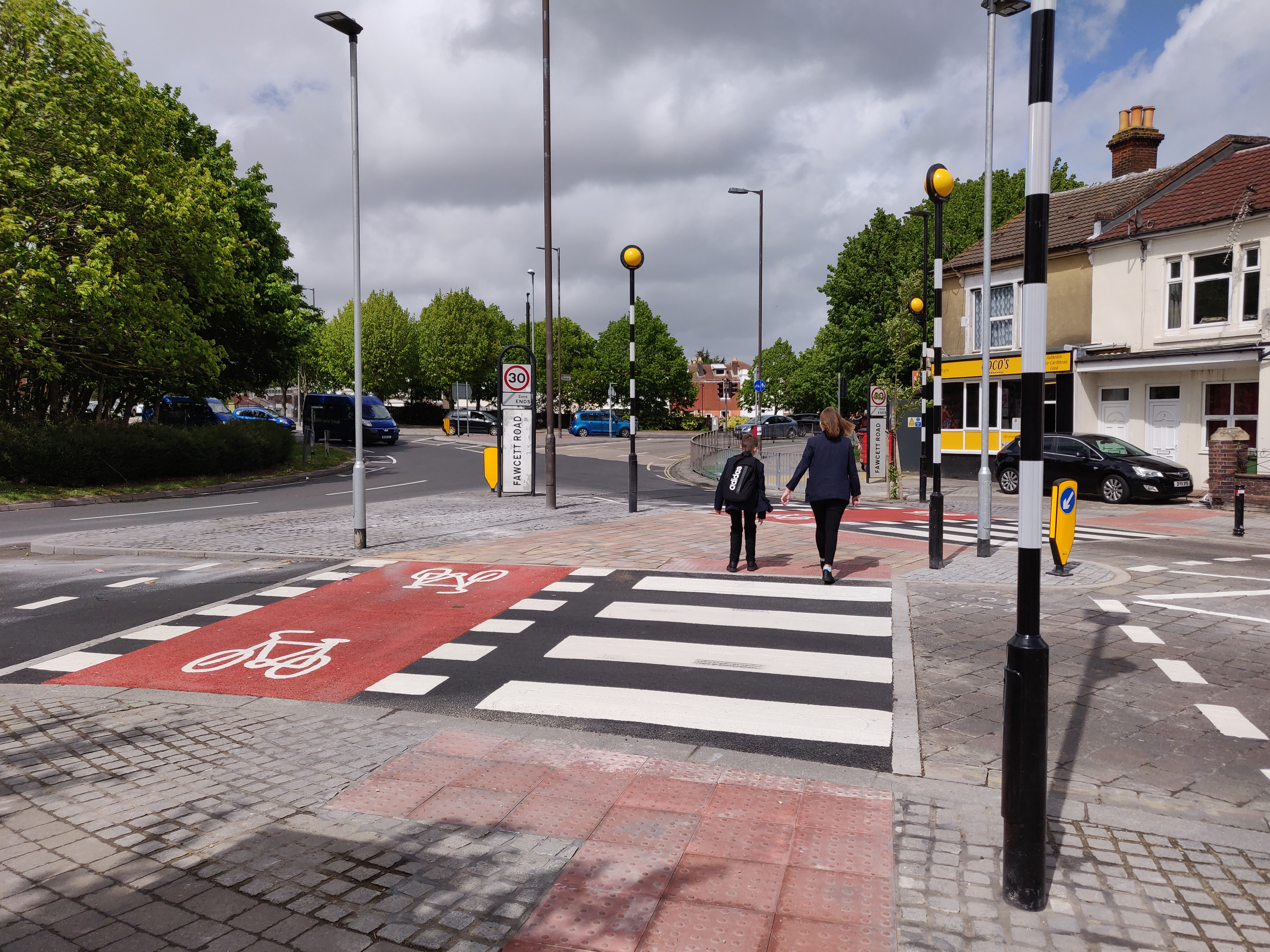
Tiger crossing allows cyclists and pedestrians to cross.

A tiger crossing is a variation used in Hong Kong and the United Kingdom. It is painted yellow and black. In the United Kingdom, it allows cyclists to cross in a central area of the road without dismounting, and obliges motorists to give way to both cyclists and pedestrians.

=== "Three-dimensional" crossings ===
A number of countries have experimented with "three-dimensional" zebra crossings based on an optical illusion. The white stripes of the crossing appear to hover above the ground as though they were a physical barrier. Although intended to improve pedestrian safety on the crossings, they have also been popular with tourists who like to be photographed crossing them, appearing to hover above the ground. Such crossings can be found in Australia, Iceland, Malaysia, India, New Zealand and the United States.

Crossings can be combined with speed tables (i.e. raised sections of road designed to physically slow traffic down) as an additional safety measure.

=== Rainbow crossings ===
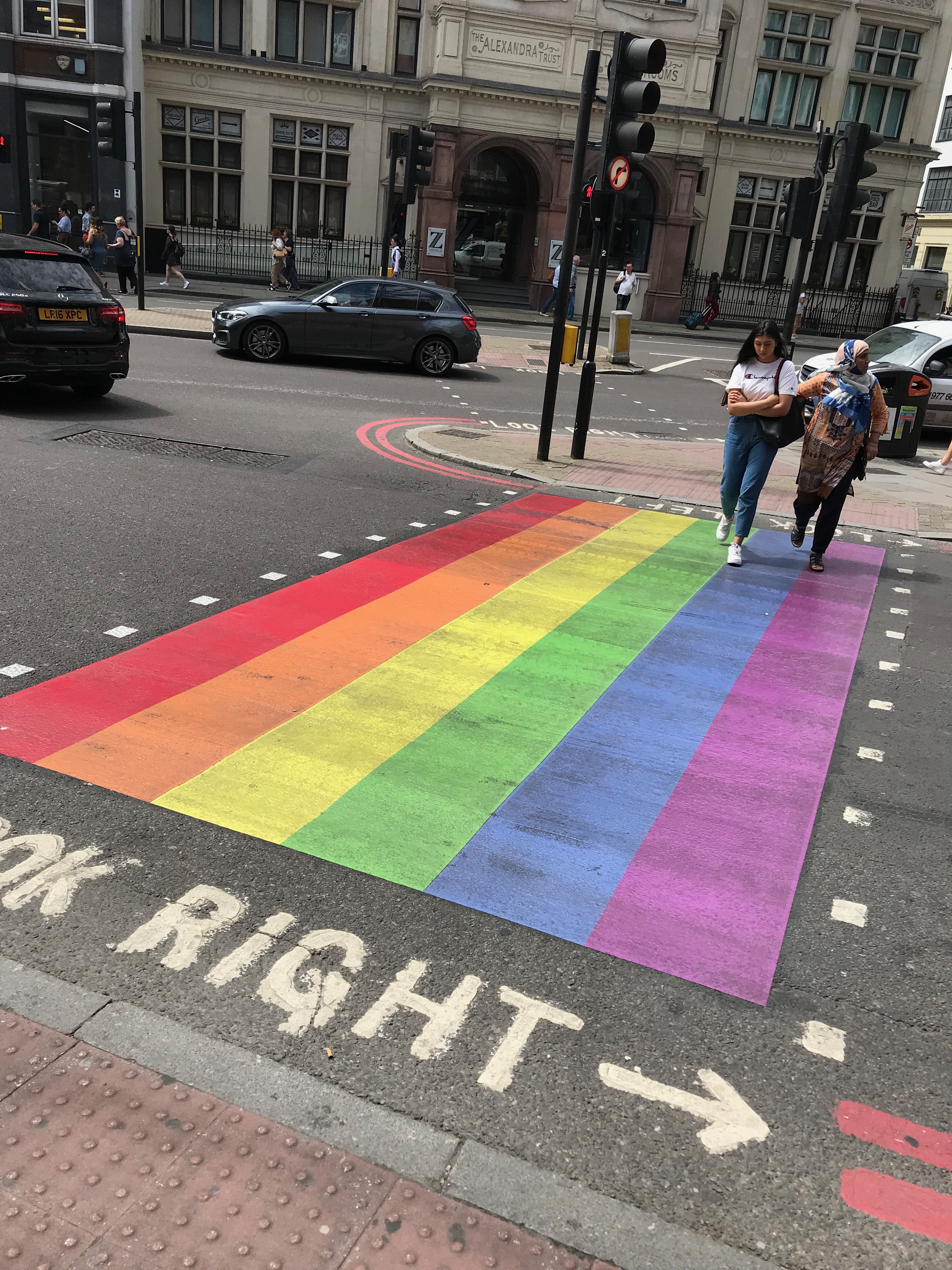
A rainbow crossing in London, England

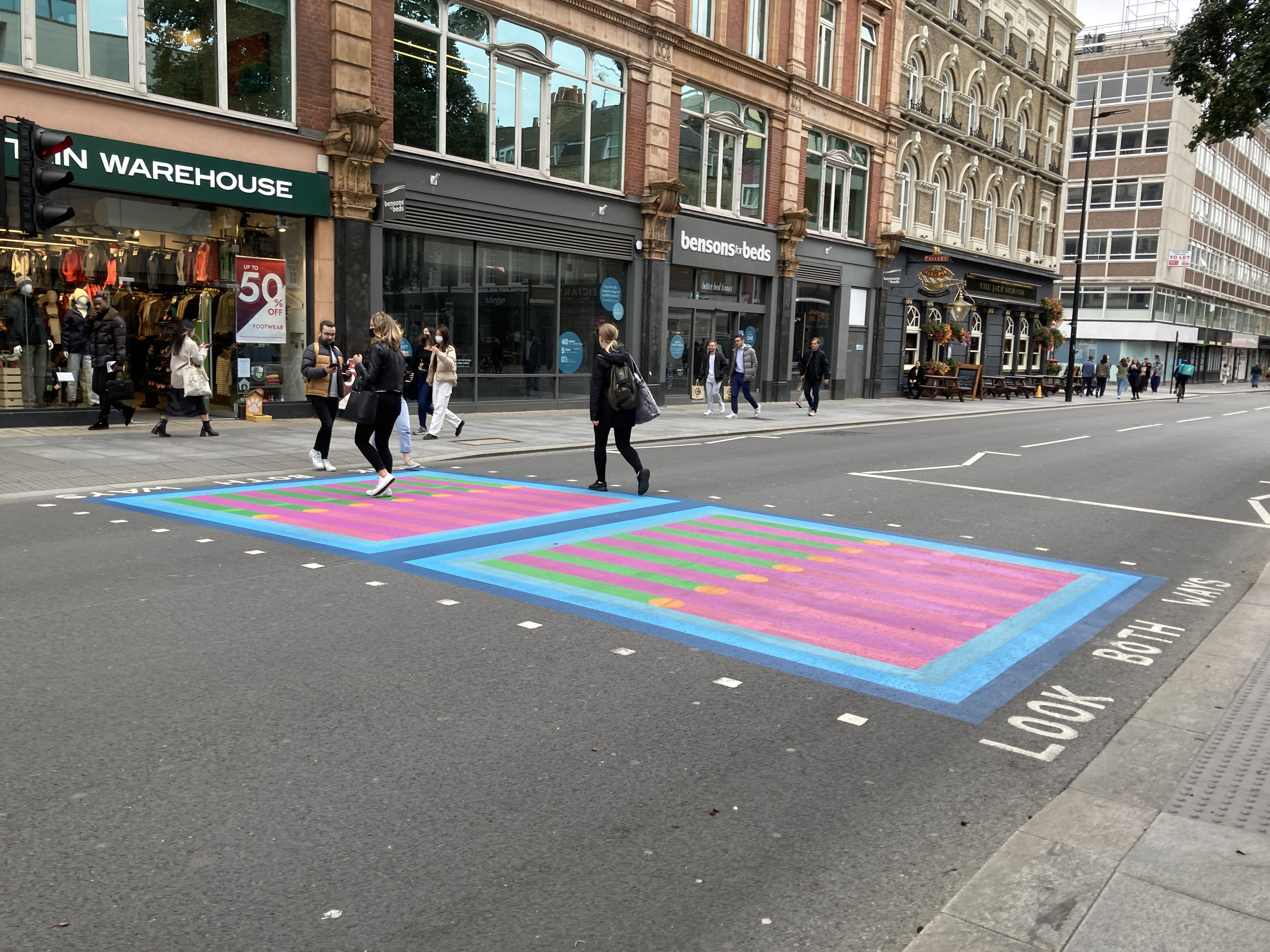
Yinka Ilori's zebra crossing, Tottenham Court Road, London

A zebra crossing immediately outside the Russian Embassy in Helsinki was painted in summer 2013 with the colours of the rainbow to protest the Russian government's policy towards lesbian and gay people, the rainbow being one symbol of the LGBT culture.

A similar protest has also been made on a zebra crossing near the Russian Embassy in Stockholm, Sweden.

In 2018 in Paris, the authorities decided to paint some crossings with rainbow borders for the Pride; those were supposed to be temporary, but after homophobic vandalism, the municipality declared that the rainbow stripes would remain permanently.

== In popular culture ==
A zebra crossing appears on the cover of The Beatles' Abbey Road album. The cover made the crossing a tourist attraction, and it has been incorporated into the Abbey Road Studios logo. Since the Abbey Road photo was taken, zigzag lines at the kerb and in the centre of the road have been added to all zebra crossings. English Heritage has given this crossing Grade II listed building status.

The La Paz traffic zebras are a team of young people who dress in zebra costumes and dance in the streets of La Paz, Bolivia, in order to make drivers and pedestrians aware of traffic rules.
