= Last Week Tonight segments about Donald Trump =

Talk show segments that featured Donald Trump

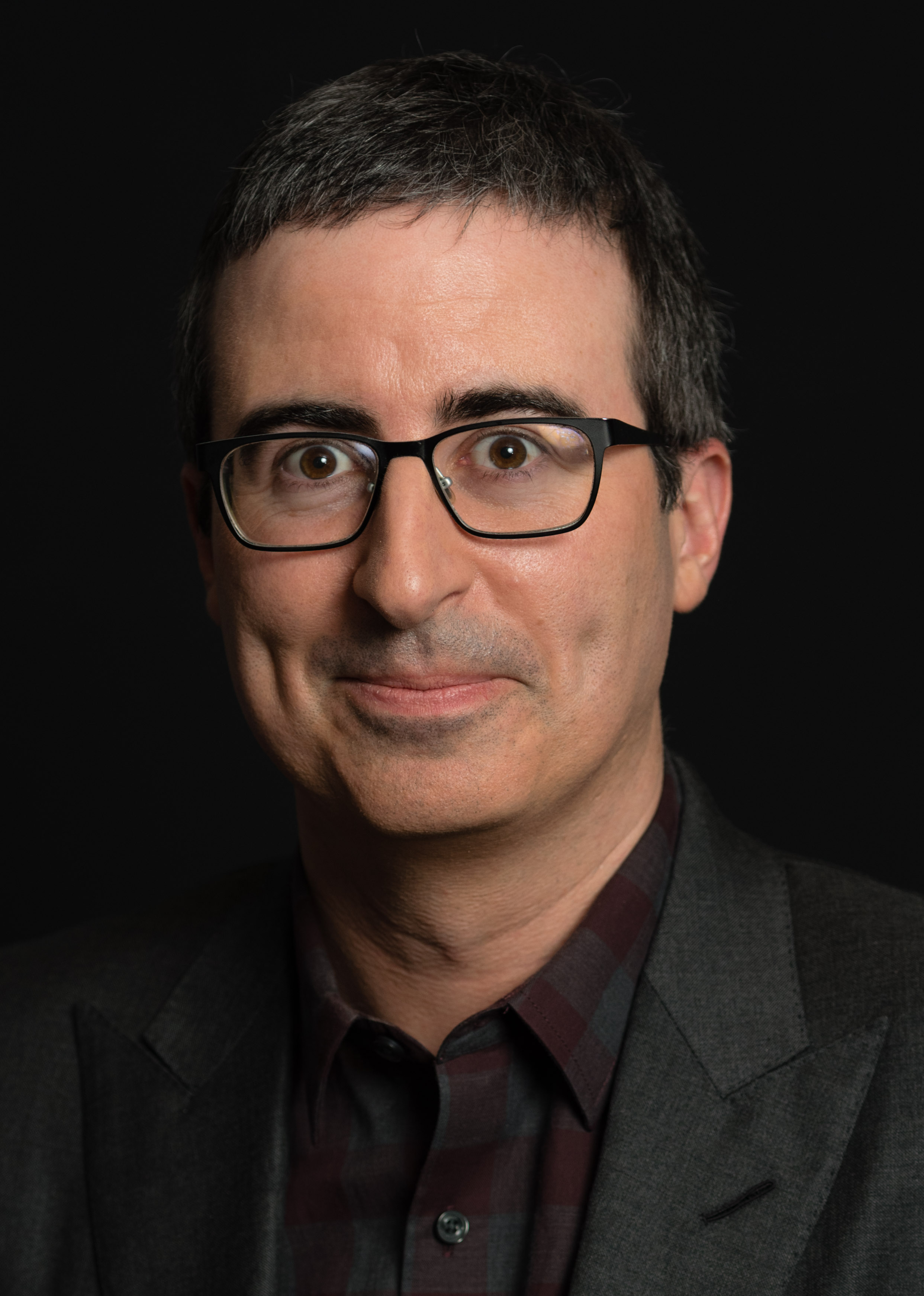
John Oliver (pictured) has focused several segments in his Last Week Tonight show on Donald Trump.

Donald Trump, the 45th and 47th president of the United States, has been the subject of segments on the HBO television series Last Week Tonight with John Oliver. They commenced during Trump's 2016 Republican primary and subsequent general election campaigns. Most are discussed in the show's opening news recap segment. The segments listed have received prominent coverage from other media, and feature Trump or his actions as part of the main segment.

== Season 3 (2016) ==
=== Episode 3: "Donald Trump" ===
"Donald Trump" was the core part of the third season's third episode, which aired for the first time on February 28, 2016. During this time, Trump was the frontrunner for the Republican Party's presidential nomination. Host John Oliver discusses Trump's 2016 presidential campaign and his career in business, outlining his campaign rhetoric, varying political positions and failed business ventures. He also says the Trump family name was changed at one point from the ancestral name "Drumpf". The segment popularized the term "Donald Drumpf", which Oliver said was coined with the intent to uncouple the grandeur of the last name to facilitate Trump's supporters' ability to acknowledge his political and entrepreneurial flaws. It also started a campaign urging viewers to "Make Donald Drumpf Again"—a play on Trump's own campaign slogan, "Make America Great Again".

=== Episode 6: "Border Wall" ===
In much of a subsequent segment that aired on March 20, 2016, three weeks after the original episode aired, Oliver talked about Trump's proposed border wall between the United States and Mexico, although the description of the segment uploaded to the show's official YouTube channel mentioned "Donald Drumpf's" plan to build the wall. In that episode's main segment, titled "Border Wall", Oliver explained some details of his criticism of Trump's border wall idea, examines the inconsistent estimates of the cost of the proposed wall's construction owing partly to Trump vowing to build a progressively higher wall, and criticizes Trump's proposal to have the Mexican government pay the cost of building the wall. Oliver estimated that the wall would cost $25 billion, not the $4 billion that Trump originally estimated it would cost, and that maintenance costs would exceed $25 billion within seven years of the wall's construction. He even offers a counterproposal of buying a waffle iron for every American, which would be cheaper, more pleasant, "do nearly as much to keep out immigrants and drugs" and "won't harm our relationship with our third largest trading partner."

He also examines the feasibility of the wall due to a 1970 international treaty between the two countries that prohibits structures that may obstruct water flow from being built along the Rio Grande and Colorado River basins. Oliver cites the example of an existing border fence that had to be built several miles inland on the Texas side of the border—resulting in the fence having to cross onto the grounds of a Brownsville golf course—because of the law, and legal implications stemming from the fence's construction. He also points to loopholes that may be used to enable migrants and drugs to enter the country illegally despite the wall's presence. Additionally, Oliver cites data that show that most Mexican-born migrants residing in the U.S. entered the latter country legally and that illegal immigrants committed violent crimes at lower rates than American citizens did, contradicting claims Trump made.

=== Episode 14: "Trump University" ===
In part of another subsequent segment on June 5, three months after "Donald Trump" first aired, Oliver talked about Trump's business tactics at Trump University. Oliver says that the 3,500 lawsuits that Trump has been involved in would exceed the combined number of episodes of most of the attorney-centered drama series that have been produced in the history of American television. He then comments on how Trump said that Gonzalo P. Curiel (the Indiana-born presiding judge for the lawsuit centering around Trump University) should recuse himself due to his Mexican heritage. Oliver then examines the Trump University lawsuit, and the issues that culminated in the lawsuit filing (including the tactics used in recruiting students for the real estate training program).

=== Episode 21: "Sarcastic Trump" ===
In part of another subsequent segment on August 14, Oliver examined remarks by Donald Trump, who during the previous week had made the suggestion that supporters of the Second Amendment could stop rival Democratic Party presidential nominee Hillary Clinton from enforcing gun control policy proposals (an open-ended remark widely considered as suggesting violence against Clinton, but downplayed by Trump and many of his Republican surrogates to suggest his supporters should take political action against her) and claimed that President Barack Obama and Clinton were "the founder[s] of ISIS," citing in the latter that Obama's decision to reduce the number of U.S. ground troops in Iraq in 2013 created a governance vacuum that led to the radical Jihadist terror group's rise (although the U.S. military reduction did play a factor in its development, ISIS traces its origins to 2004, one year after the Iraq War began under the partial guidance of Obama's predecessor George W. Bush, as an Iraq-based arm of al-Qaeda). Oliver said that in response to criticism of Trump, Trump had replied, "Obviously I'm being sarcastic ... but not that sarcastic, to be honest with you."

In calling out Trump's attempt to clarify the remark as sarcastic and Trump's repeated walking back of that justification days later, Oliver described Trump's statement as "bullshit" and a "douchebag's apology" and stated that trying to rationalize Trump's campaign is "like watching a circus seal fold laundry". Oliver also called Trump's sarcasm "absurd", and joked about Trump's false claim that Clinton was a co-founder, saying by using the show's recurring social media gag, "Hashtag #Feminism, hashtag #IsisWithHer". He also criticizes Trump's false suggestion that the election would have been rigged against him if Clinton won the Electoral College and popular vote in Pennsylvania in the November 8 general election (prior to the 2016 presidential election, in which Trump carried the state in the Electoral College, no Republican presidential candidate had won Pennsylvania since 1988) and enlist his supporters to become observers to prevent electoral manipulation, arguing that it could set a dangerous precedent if his supporters question the validity of the votes and could result in intimidation tactics towards Democratic-leaning voters.

=== Episode 22: "Message to Donald Trump" ===
In part of his August 21, 2016 episode, Oliver discussed Trump's ranking in the polls for the preceding week and the changes in his campaign staff, including the installation of Kellyanne Conway as his campaign manager following the resignation of Paul Manafort upon the disclosure of his ties to the government of Russia. Oliver argued that these events were either "[signals that Trump's campaign was] hitting bottom from which he will rebound to victory" or "the beginning of the end".

Oliver then examined Trump's options: losing to Hillary Clinton, whom a majority of Americans did not find trustworthy in several opinion polls at percentages almost equal to Trump, and risk ruining his own brand's image of success and wealth in part because of his rhetoric and repeated controversies during the campaign cycle; or resetting his campaign and getting elected president. Oliver argued that the latter option would be even worse for Trump than losing the election, as then he would be burdened with the responsibilities and realities of the position and be miserable about it in large part because Trump would have had to make significant changes to his extravagant and hedonistic lifestyle. Oliver then devoted the remainder of the segment by speaking directly to Trump, restating how both of these outcomes would make Trump miserable. Oliver proposed a third option for Trump, which would be to drop out and demonstrate how his whole campaign was "a satire designed to expose the flaws in the system". Oliver then pointed out how Trump had exposed four particular flaws: campaign financing in American politics, sensationalism in the media, how prominent Republicans have stood by his controversial stances at the risk of their own political careers, and how voters have embraced him for said stances regardless of their opinion of his divisive remarks and policy proposals pertaining to immigrants and Muslims.

Oliver then said that were Trump to drop out, he would be a legend and there would be a federal holiday in Trump's honor named "Guy Who Decided Not to Be President's Day". To demonstrate how this would work out, Oliver cited the 1996 Dan Gutman children's book The Kid Who Ran for President. With the assistance of Will Arnett, Oliver demonstrated that many aspects of Trump's personality and campaign resemble those of the book's title character, Judson Moon. In particular, Oliver suggested that Trump plagiarize the resignation speech given by Moon after he is haphazardly elected President of the United States in dismay that voters took his joke candidacy seriously, which Oliver would argue is a "perfect Trumpian address" and "kind of a thing for [Trump's] campaign". Oliver then invited Trump to read that speech on his show.

=== Episode 25: "Trump's Lewd Remarks" ===
The election recap segment of the October 9 episode touches upon an outtake from a September 2005 Access Hollywood segment released by The Washington Post two days earlier, in which Trump inferred to then-host Billy Bush that his celebrity status gave Trump license to make inappropriate sexual advances with women (including grabbing their genitalia without permission). Recalling a comment he made in a segment from the previous week's episode about Trump's broadcast interview and social media attacks on Alicia Machado—whose claims of public fat-shaming by Trump after a weight gain that followed her 1996 crowning as Miss Universe was cited by Hillary Clinton as a key example of his negative views on women in the September 26 presidential debate—that if one were to look "above the clouds, [they would see] rock bottom," Oliver states that Trump's remarks in the Access tape had sunk the presidential campaign to the point of "breaking through the Earth's crust, where drowning in boiling magma will come a sweet, sweet relief". He also briefly blasts Bush for going along with Trump's remarks, as well as former Trump campaign manager Corey Lewandowski's diversionary hypothesis in a CNN phone interview that Clinton may have expressed statements identical to those Trump made in the tape in her speeches to Wall Street banking institutions (excerpts of which were leaked in a broader stream of emails purported to have been hacked from the email accounts of Clinton's campaign staff that WikiLeaks began publishing on October 7, when the tape was released).

Oliver then excoriates members of the Republican Party who continued to support Trump as the party's presidential nominee despite his prior controversial statements and various remarks that offended racial and religious minorities during the course of the campaign to avoid jeopardizing their chances of re-election by alienating Trump's supporters, only for the remarks to force them to rescind endorsements or distance themselves from Trump because of the risk to their re-election by more moderate Republicans and other voters offended by the footage, saying that their outrage would only be justified if "[they] were cryogenically frozen until Friday afternoon, and that Access Hollywood tape was the first thing [they] saw upon being re-animated"; Oliver also questions the move of several male Republican Senate and House members to frame their outrage about the comments on behalf of their female relatives. After noting that it would be impossible for the Republican National Committee to drop Trump as the nominee so close to the November 8 general election, since early voting had already commenced in some states, he closes the segment equating the appropriateness of Trump (whom Oliver describes as "the human embodiment of every backwards, condescending Mad Men-esque boys' club attitude that has ever existed, rolled into one giant, salivating, dick size-referencing, pussy-grabbing warthog in a red power tie") being Clinton's political opponent—given his past remarks about women—to that of Trump serving as the final boss in a computer game that she must defeat to complete the goal of becoming the first female U.S. president.

=== Episode 30: "President-Elect Trump" ===
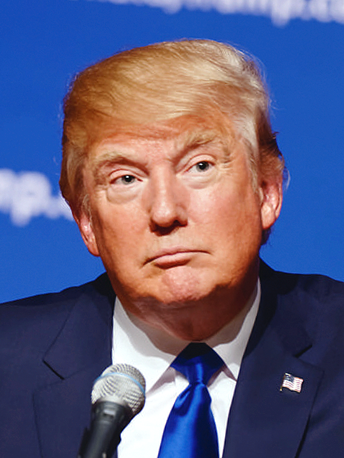
John Oliver ended Season 3 with a reaction to the election of Donald Trump (pictured) as U.S. president.

The November 13, 2016, finale for the third season served as a recap for the election results. During the episode, Oliver expressed disgust that the United States elected Donald Trump (who became President-elect by Electoral College vote, but lost to Hillary Clinton by just under 2.9 million votes in the popular vote tally, a situation Trump mentioned—in some cases erroneously claiming to have won the popular vote as well—several times prior to and after his presidential inauguration), and demonstrates how Trump will, on January 20, 2017, be entrusted with the various powers of the presidency.

Oliver demonstrated his disgust over the following issues: Trump's access to America's nuclear arsenal; Trump's failure to condemn the endorsement of David Duke, a former Grand Wizard of the Ku Klux Klan; Trump's ability to appoint Justices to the Supreme Court of the United States; Trump's responsibility over the United States Armed Forces; and potential violations of international law due to his support for tactics such as waterboarding and civilian casualties. Oliver also acknowledged that he will accept the results of the election, despite his personal disapproval over the results and his wariness over Trump's potential. Oliver argued that giving Trump a chance would be tantamount to normalizing him, which Oliver further stated would enable Trump to carry out some of his more controversial campaign promises. Furthermore, Oliver expressed his worries that Trump might or might not fulfill his campaign promises, both of which Oliver argued were highly unpleasant. To demonstrate this, Oliver played a clip of Trump's first post-election interview in which he had considered maintaining some aspects of the Patient Protection and Affordable Care Act, despite campaigning against it during the election.

Oliver then told the audience that the American people should take all of Trump's campaign promises seriously. Oliver also admitted that, despite his disagreements with Trump, some of his campaign promises, such as his promise to "drain the swamp" on political corruption were not "universally bad". Oliver then examined Trump's candidates for potential Cabinet members, such as Newt Gingrich, Rudolph Giuliani, and Reince Priebus, all of whom have had significant experience in American politics. Oliver argued that this was due to Trump's own lack of experience in government. Oliver then examined the possible reasons for Trump's victory, such as misleading forecasts, shortcomings in Hillary Clinton's campaign (namely her inability to appeal to white, rural, and working-class voters), and America's history of racism. Oliver then devoted a large portion of the episode on what he considered to be a major reason: Trump's media coverage during the election. Furthermore, Oliver argued that another reason for Trump's victory would be fake news on social media, and how more people obtained their news from Facebook. Oliver also demonstrated that even Trump himself was not immune to accepting fake news as legitimate news sources, something that Oliver argued earned him (Trump) the disdain of even fellow Republicans such as Ted Cruz. However, Oliver then demonstrated a clip of Cruz at a Republican campaign, rallying support for Trump.

Oliver then resumed his overview of the powers and privileges that Trump will be given as president, such as having his portrait in airports and comforting the families of casualties of war. Oliver then joked that Trump would look up the salary of the President and then resign out of disappointment, but that would leave then-Vice President-elect Mike Pence as president. Oliver argued that Pence would be even worse than Trump as president. Oliver then proposed some options to curtail Trump's potential damage as president. This included donating to organizations that support progressive causes such as Planned Parenthood, the Center for Reproductive Rights, the Natural Resources Defense Council, the International Refugee Assistance Project, the Mexican-American Legal Defense and Education Fund, the NAACP Legal Defense and Education Fund, and the Trevor Project. Oliver argued that his audience should also support the press, given Trump's inability to accept reality and responsibility as well as his promise to "open up those libel laws". Oliver also warned his audience not to normalize Trump. Oliver argued that the year 2016 was, in his opinion, a rather unpleasant one. In addition to the election, the Syrian refugee crisis, Zika outbreak, and the deaths of various celebrities during the year were factors that contributed to this dislike. Oliver compiled a montage of people on the street as well as celebrities such as Amy Schumer, Larry Wilmore, and "Weird Al" Yankovic lamenting these negative events. Oliver concludes the episode (and the season) by blowing up a sign of 2016 to the tune of Ludwig van Beethoven's "Ode to Joy".

== Season 4 (2017) ==
=== Episode 1: "Trump vs. Truth" ===
In the core portion of the fourth-season premiere on February 12, 2017, Oliver discussed Trump's propensity to base his statements on tenuous or questionable media sources. Oliver began by discussing Trump's exaggerations or outright fabrications concerning voter fraud, Christian refugees from Syria, and the weather on his inauguration day. (For these specific examples, Trump had claimed, without proof, that millions of people cast votes illegally and that Syrian Christians had a significantly harder time getting asylum into the United States than did Syrian Muslims; and stated, falsely, that it stopped raining during his inauguration.) Oliver then compared the PolitiFact Truth-O-Meter ratings for Trump and for former President Obama. While the proportion of Obama's statements that were at least mostly false stood at 26%, the same proportion of Trump's statements that were mostly or fully false was 69%, more than twice as high as Obama's, at the time of the video's airing. Oliver claimed that Trump had been exaggerating long before his presidential candidacy, saying that Trump couldn't even tell the truth about how tall his buildings were, since the highest floor of the 58-story Trump Tower was numbered "68".

Oliver stated, "Trump's relationship with the truth is going to be of profound importance going forward." He noted that key advisers such as Peter Thiel have defended Trump's statements on topics like a proposed travel ban by saying that "he didn't really mean it," but then said that the travel ban actually happened and that Trump himself had said that he was serious about the ban. Oliver also cited the impending construction of Trump's Mexican border wall, which he described as "might be 30 feet high and labeled 156 stories." A big part of Trump's high rate of exaggerations or falsehoods, Oliver said, was because Trump liked to watch cable news. Oliver further explained that Trump stumbled on responses to simple governmental common knowledge such as the nuclear triad, and that his posts on Twitter quoted, sometimes word-for-word, cable news sources that had aired fifteen minutes prior. He showed a clip of Trump aboard Air Force One, being interviewed by members of press while a commercial for carpets blares in the background. Oliver responds to that clip by summoning a video of a cowboy advertising the use of catheters. He goes on to state that Trump has repeatedly cited right-wing websites like Breitbart and InfoWars, sometimes verbatim, and then listed some headlines of questionable veracity that these two websites have published.

Oliver then listed some of the effects of Trump's statements. For instance, Trump said he lost the election's popular vote because millions of people supposedly voted illegally. Oliver surmised that this was based on a post by one Twitter user, who falsely claimed to have "verified more than three million votes cast by non-citizens" but refused to release any evidence to support that assertion. As a result, Oliver said, many Trump supporters believed that there was widespread voter fraud despite credible evidence to the contrary, citing a video interview with one such Trump supporter. Oliver also commented on a video of White House Press Secretary Sean Spicer defending Trump's right to state his opinions, and stated that opposition to the press within Trump's administration exists at the leadership level, with chief strategist Steve Bannon calling the media "the opposition party." Oliver mentioned the obvious nepotism displayed in the White House's decision to reserve a single media press-conference seat for Breitbart, which Bannon headed before he joined Trump's campaign. He also ridicules one U.S. representative's proposal for the public to get their information directly from Trump himself, comparing it to the news media of North Korea. He ended the video by suggesting that people fact-check their information before sharing it on social media and announcing that he was purchasing airtime on cable systems in Washington, D.C. and Trump's hometown of New York City to run locally inserted advertisements during cable news programs that Trump liked to watch, namely CNN's New Day, MSNBC's Morning Joe, and Fox News Channel's Fox & Friends. In these advertisements, another catheter-using cowboy (played by Thomas Kopache) describes topics like the nuclear triad, global warming, and Trump's youngest daughter's name.

=== Episode 13: "Stupid Watergate" ===
A recurring segment called "Stupid Watergate" is concerned with the appearance of Russian interference in the 2016 United States elections and resulting coverups. It is called "Stupid Watergate" because, according to Oliver, it is "a scandal with all the potential ramifications of Watergate, but where everyone involved is stupid and bad at everything".

The segment was most prominently featured in the May 21, 2017 episode, also titled "Stupid Watergate", which recapped a week of negative news regarding President Trump, including the controversies over Trump leaking classified information to Russia during an Oval Office visit as well as the much debated dismissal of FBI Director James Comey. The title's direct reference to the Watergate scandal piggybacks off comments made by politicians such as Arizona Senator John McCain, who had asserted that the scandals were "reaching the point where it's of Watergate size and scale". Other statements by the President received additional scrutiny from Oliver as well.

The episode particularly highlighted Trump's complaint during the Presidential commencement address for the Coast Guard Academy that "[n]o politician in history, and I say this with great surety, has been treated worse or more unfairly." Oliver remarked:

Garfield was shot, then to find the bullet, Alexander Graham Bell devised a kind of metal detector, which didn't work, so doctors tried to fish around in his guts for the bullet with unwashed fingers, which just made his infection worse, so he died in horrible pain. But yeah, Alec Baldwin sometimes does a mean impression of you on TV. So yeah, it's basically the same, isn't it?

=== Episode 30: "The Trump Presidency" ===
The show's fourth season concluded on November 12, 2017, just over a year after Trump won the election. Oliver says that Trump's presidency is tiring, saying that "every room in America should have a sign on the wall that counts the number of minutes that it's been since someone brought up his fucking name." Oliver compares Trump's presidency to several of Trump's handshakes in that "it pulls you in whether you like it or not". The comedian lists several awkward moments, such as the United States Department of State's advertisement of Trump's Mar-a-Lago resort; Trump's 25-second handshake with French president Emmanuel Macron; and an incident where Trump shoved Montenegro's prime minister, Duško Marković, out of the way at a NATO conference. Oliver shows a clip where Trump talks about a "clean coal" mine that was opening in Pennsylvania, then makes fun of the statement, saying that Trump might know what he was talking about, but he might also have been talking about the act of sanitizing coal.

Oliver then takes a look at the norms that Trump's presidency has broken, including the refusal to continue the practice that all presidents release their tax returns; the failure to put The Trump Organization into a blind trust to prevent conflict of interest; and the nepotism-based act of placing his daughter Ivanka Trump and her husband Jared Kushner into positions at the White House. Oliver also says that Trump's speaking style is incoherent. To prove this Oliver compares one of Trump's speeches on the Iran nuclear deal framework to a speech written by an iPhone's autocorrect function, concluding that the iPhone text was more understandable.

Oliver then describes three of Trump's "assaults" on civic leadership norms. The first "assault", according to the comedian, is the delegitimization of the news media by describing several news outlets as "fake news". The second "assault" is something Oliver called "whataboutism", a logical fallacy involving an appeal to hypocrisy, which the comedian says was used by the Soviet Union to discredit opponents by labeling them as hypocrites. The final "assault" is trolling, which Trump uses to enrage opponents even if an action does not benefit him directly. Oliver caricatures a disaffected blue-collar factory worker who voted for Trump and supported the president's action to enlarge the United States' nuclear arsenal: "Well, the plant closed down and I lost my health care, but somewhere a Washington Post reporter is scared of dying so things are looking up. MAGA!"

The comedian then gives an example where "Trump was explicitly given the opportunity to set the record straight for the fake news media but he flat-out refused." When CBS News interviewed Trump on the 100th day of his presidency, the president was asked to clarify a comment. Instead, in response to repeated queries, Trump repeatedly said, "You can take it any way you want", and then sat behind his desk, thereby concluding the interview. Oliver then notes the spread of Trump's techniques—delegitimization, appeal to hypocrisy, and trolling—to the greater Republican Party. The comedian talks about a case where Paul Gosar, the Republican U.S. representative for Arizona's 4th congressional district, used all three tactics. When CNN confronted Gosar about his controversial comments that the Charlottesville rally was a false flag operation by the left (a "trollish behavior" according to Oliver), he called CNN "fake news" and said, "Look at what's going on with the [Hillary] Clinton administration right now with the dossier", referencing the Steele dossier that hinted at Russia's involvement in Trump's presidential campaign. Oliver brings up another example of the appeal to hypocrisy, talking about the sexual abuse allegations surrounding Roy Moore (the Republican candidate for Alabama's 2017 U.S. Senate election), and noting that conservative Fox News commentator Sean Hannity responded to the controversy by asking about the allegations surrounding former Democratic U.S. President Bill Clinton.

Oliver concludes by noting Democrats' recent electoral and legislative victories, such as the election of Democratic candidate Ralph Northam in the 2017 Virginia gubernatorial election, and the delays in Republican efforts to end the Affordable Care Act. He then announces that he would be airing "Catheter Cowboy" ads on Fox News-affiliated channels in the Washington, D.C. area, featuring Thomas Kopache as a cowboy who seemingly talks about pain before correcting Trump's misconceptions.

== Season 5 (2018) ==
=== Episode 1: "Trump vs. The World" ===
As the first episode of season 5, premiering on 18 February 2018, "Trump vs. The World" deals with the foreign policy followed by the Trump Administration towards nations that are traditionally seen as allies of the United States, including Germany. The segment describes the effects that the strategies of "soft power" and "America First" have had on the international community and how America has since come to be viewed around the world.

== Season 6 (2019) ==
=== Episode 27: "Trump & Syria" ===
On the 27 October 2019 episode near the end of season 6, Oliver in "Trump & Syria" covered the aftermath of the Trump administration's 6 October decision to pull U.S. troops out of northeastern Syria and the resulting Turkish offensive into northeastern Syria. Oliver offered a short congratulation on the Barisha raid that resulted in the death of ISIL leader Abu Bakr al-Baghdadi (though he also characterized the President's press conference afterward as "weird"), but criticized the President for upending the U.S. alliance with the Kurds in Syria who provided much of the preceding intelligence. Oliver also mentioned the withdrawal allowed the escape of 100 ISIL prisoners, and signaled Trump's deferral to the whims of authoritarian leaders such as Turkish President Recep Tayyip Erdogan, Syrian President Bashar al-Assad, and Russian President Vladimir Putin in the region. Oliver argued Trump's view of foreign policy was very "short-term" and "transactional", noting Trump falsely claimed Saudi Arabia paid for a larger deployment of U.S. troops there at the same time.

== Season 11 (2024) ==
=== Episode 15: "Trump's Second Term" ===
Ahead of the 2024 U.S. Presidential Election, John Oliver posited what a second term of Donald Trump's presidency might look like. It started by highlighting Trump's ranting about his then-impending sentencing over the Stormy Daniels hush money case, his lies about trans people bringing about the invention of "the radical left just a few years ago," and claims of cutting funding to any schools that have vaccine or mask mandates.

Of note is Trump's generous use of Nazi-esque rhetoric, such as calling his enemies "vermin", and the introduction of Project 2025, a 900-page handbook compiled by the Heritage Foundation, often referred as "Trump's game plan" for his second presidential term. Oliver highlighted some of the damages that Project 2025's plans could do, including dismantling NOAA, eliminating the Head Start program, outlines for plans to defund the Department of Justice and the FBI, eliminate the Department of Education and Commerce and, in a rather bizarre twist, plans to outlaw pornography, and suggesting that those who produce and distribute them should be imprisoned.

Oliver drew the connection that so many of the people responsible for the Project 2025 document were once, or still are, part of Trump's administration and/or campaign. Individuals named on the episode include Russ Vought, Stephen Miller, Jared Kushner, John McEntee, and Larry Kudlow among others as the architects and advocates of Project 2025.
