= Donald Trump (Last Week Tonight with John Oliver) =

- Last Week Tonight with John Oliver segment
- John Oliver urges viewers to refer to Donald Trump as "Donald Drumpf"
- Episode no.: Season 3 Episode 3 (segment)
- Presented by: John Oliver
- Original air date: February 28, 2016
- Running time: 22 minutes

"Donald Trump" is a segment of the HBO news satire television series Last Week Tonight with John Oliver that is devoted to Donald Trump, later the president of the United States. It first aired on February 28, 2016, as part of the third episode of Last Week Tonight's third season, when Trump was the frontrunner for the Republican Party nomination for the presidency. During the 22-minute segment, comedian John Oliver discusses Trump's 2016 presidential campaign and his career in business. Oliver outlines Trump's campaign rhetoric, varying political positions, and failed business ventures. The comedian also criticizes Trump for making offensive and false statements, and says the Trump family name was changed at one point from the ancestral name Drumpf.

The satirical segment went viral on YouTube and Facebook. By Super Tuesday on March 1, two days after broadcast, Google searches for "Donald Drumpf" had surpassed those for both Ted Cruz and Marco Rubio, who were then competing with Trump for the Republican Party nomination. In eight days, the segment accumulated 19 million views on YouTube, making it Last Week Tonight's most popular segment there. By the end of March, it had received a combined 85 million views on YouTube and Facebook. The segment popularized the term "Donald Drumpf", a name for Trump that Oliver uses toward the end of the segment. Oliver intended the term to uncouple the grandeur of the Trump name so the latter's supporters could acknowledge his political and entrepreneurial flaws. The comedian promoted a campaign urging viewers to "Make Donald Drumpf Again", a play on Trump's "Make America Great Again" campaign slogan. Oliver coined a hashtag and registered a web domain to promote the term; the website offered a Google Chrome extension to change instances of "Trump" to "Drumpf" and sold baseball caps with the slogan "Make Donald Drumpf Again".

The segment started a public debate on when the Trump family renamed themselves from "Drumpf". Commentators debated whether the family changed their name in the 17th or 19th century but agreed that neither Donald Trump nor his father Fred ever carried the surname "Drumpf". Reviews of the segment itself were mixed: some praised the segment for being funny and informational, but others criticized Oliver for the possible xenophobic undertones attached to mocking the "Drumpf" surname. Oliver stopped using the name "Drumpf" in subsequent segments, saying the joke "went out of hand".

== Episode summary ==
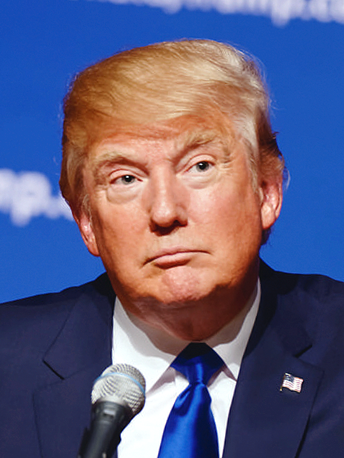
The segment about Donald Trump (pictured) was part of the third episode of Last Week Tonight's third season.

The 22-minute segment about Donald Trump was delivered by John Oliver on February 28, 2016, during the third episode of the third season of Last Week Tonight, and the 62nd episode overall. At the start of the episode's main segment, Oliver introduces the topic of Trump's presidential campaign. He refers to it, and his dark horse popularity among Republican voters and those who did not usually vote in presidential elections, as "America's back mole". Oliver says, "It may have seemed harmless a year ago, but now that it's become frighteningly bigger, it's no longer wise to ignore it."

After summarizing his "unpredictable and entertaining" style and acknowledging his appeal to voters disenchanted with the American political establishment, Oliver criticizes Trump as a "serial liar". The comedian outlines that Trump had made dubious and unsubstantiated claims regarding his net worth, then lists several of Trump's failed businesses and investments, including some of his real estate properties. Oliver mentions that Trump falsely claimed to have declined to appear on Last Week Tonight but had never been invited; that Trump was not self-funding his 2016 presidential campaign, despite saying otherwise; and that in an interview in the 2003 documentary Born Rich Trump's daughter Ivanka had said her father once portrayed himself as poorer than a homeless person.

Oliver states that Trump had frequently threatened to file lawsuits against various people, but had never actually filed these lawsuits, and has settled lawsuits filed against him about his never-completed condominium developments despite Trump's claim that he never settles any of his legal disputes. He says that Trump was also sensitive about the size of his fingers due to a 1988 Spy feature piece that criticized him as a "short-fingered vulgarian". The now-defunct magazine's editor, E. Graydon Carter—who discussed the story in a November 2015 Vanity Fair article—said that after the article was published, Trump would send envelopes enclosed with photos of himself at various times, with all the pictures highlighting his fingers with a circular gold Sharpie to dispute the claims.

External videos
- Last Week Tonight with John Oliver: Season 3 Episode 62 on HBO
- Last Week Tonight with John Oliver: Donald Trump (HBO) on YouTube

Oliver next calls Trump inconsistent in the political views that he expressed during and prior to his campaign, saying that "he's been pro choice and pro life; he's been for and against assault weapon bans; in favor of both bringing in Syrian refugees and deporting them out of the country." Oliver states that during a phone-in interview on Fox & Friends, Trump had advocated killing families of suspected terrorists as part of his strategy to defeat ISIS, which would constitute a war crime under the laws of the Geneva Convention.

Afterward, Oliver alleges that former Ku Klux Klan Grand Wizard David Duke was one of Trump's campaign backers, and that Trump had publicly denounced Duke in 2000 but then claimed to not know who Duke was in 2016. The comedian also mentions that Trump had failed to repudiate Duke in interviews with various Sunday morning talk shows on the day of the episode's broadcast, after Duke advocated his white supremacist supporters the previous week to endorse Trump due to the Republican candidate's campaign rhetoric. Up to that point, Trump had been accused by the mainstream media of promoting bigotry against several ethnicities during his campaign, including Hispanophobia and Islamophobia. The comedian criticizes Trump's claim not to know who Duke was, citing a 2000 NBC News interview in which Trump called Duke "a bigot [and] a racist"; Oliver notes that, having given such an answer despite the contradiction, Trump "is either racist or [is] pretending to be, and at some point, there's no difference there." In total, Trump was lying about three-fourths of the time, according to Oliver, who cited a PolitiFact study of the statements made by Trump since the launch of his presidential campaign.

=== "Make Donald Drumpf Again" ===
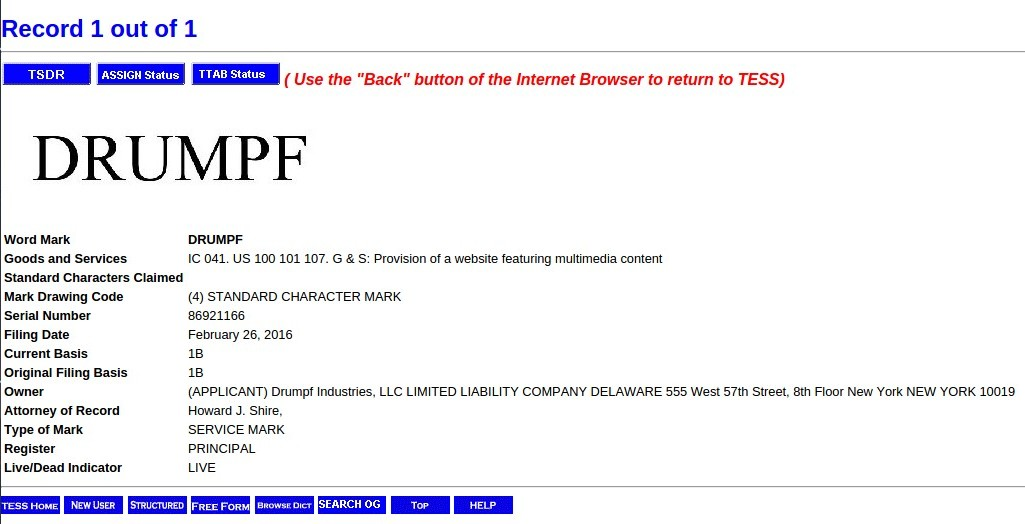
The trademark request for the name "Drumpf" (pictured) was rejected.

In the final portion of the segment, Oliver urges viewers to refer to Donald Trump by the Trump family's ancestral name of "Drumpf". Oliver pointed out earlier in the piece that Trump had repeatedly mocked Jewish-American comedian Jon Stewart by referring to him as "Jonathan Leibowitz", the comedian's birth name. Oliver, an alumnus of Stewart's Daily Show, justified the "Drumpf" epithet by insisting that "[Trump] should be proud of his heritage!", parodying Trump's mockery of Stewart in a May 2013 Twitter post that Trump later denied having written. Oliver opines that the name "Drumpf" reflects Trump's true nature much more accurately, and says that if viewers wanted to vote for "the charismatic guy promising to make America great again", they should "stop and take a moment to imagine how [they] would feel if [they] just met a guy named Donald Drumpf—a litigious serial liar with a string of broken business ventures and the support of a former Klan leader who he can't decide whether or not to condemn."

After noting the "powerful" and "almost onomatopoeic" connotation that the Trump surname has with some people, Oliver says of the ancestral name, "Drumpf is much less magical. It's the sound produced when a morbidly obese pigeon flies into the window of a foreclosed Old Navy. [...] It's the sound of a bottle of store-brand root beer falling off the shelf in a gas station minimart." The segment closes with Oliver walking toward a lighted "DRUMPF" sign, informing those watching the segment who are considering voting for Trump, "Don't vote for him because he tells it like it is. He's a bullshit artist. Don't vote for him because he's tough. He's a baby, with even smaller fingers. Don't vote for him because he's a builder. He's more of a shitty lifestyle brand." Oliver then challenges Trump to sue him over the segment.

A trademark application for the word "Drumpf" was filed with the United States Patent and Trademark Office by a company called Drumpf Industries, a limited liability company based in Delaware. The request was rejected in May 2016 on the grounds that the proposed trademark would be based on a living person, i.e. Donald Trump, but that Trump had not given his written consent to trademark his name. After the segment, Oliver released a Google Chrome extension dubbed the "Drumpfinator", which changes all instances of "Trump" to "Drumpf" on webpages. He coined and displayed the hashtag "#MakeDonaldDrumpfAgain" during the segment. Oliver also registered the web domain "donaldjdrumpf.com" to provide free downloads of the "Drumpfinator" Chrome extension and sell red baseball caps branded with the slogan "Make Donald Drumpf Again". The "Make Donald Drumpf Again" caps, manufactured by Unionwear, were modeled after Trump's red "Make America Great Again" caps.

== Reception and aftermath ==
Immediately after the segment aired, web searches for "Donald Drumpf" went viral. By March 1, the date on which the "Super Tuesday" primaries were held, Google Searches for "Donald Drumpf" had surpassed those for both Ted Cruz and Marco Rubio, two of Trump's rivals for the Republican presidential nomination. Other media also started reporting on Trump's "short fingers" shortly after the episode's broadcast, prompting Trump to write a Twitter post on March 1 in which he stated that he was not aware of any mockery of his "short fingers".

By March 4, six days after the segment's air date, the "Drumpfinator" Chrome extension had received over 333,800 downloads and 5,800 reviews. The Drumpfinator and similar extensions resulted in multiple outlets accidentally replacing Trump's name. The American Jewish Congress announced the results of a poll of their members that referred to the candidate as "Donald Drumpf", which they later acknowledged was an accident caused by someone's use of the extension. Wired magazine published multiple articles replacing Trump's name with the phrase "Someone with Tiny Hands" in reference to the "Short-Fingered Vulgarian" meme, a result of another Chrome extension.

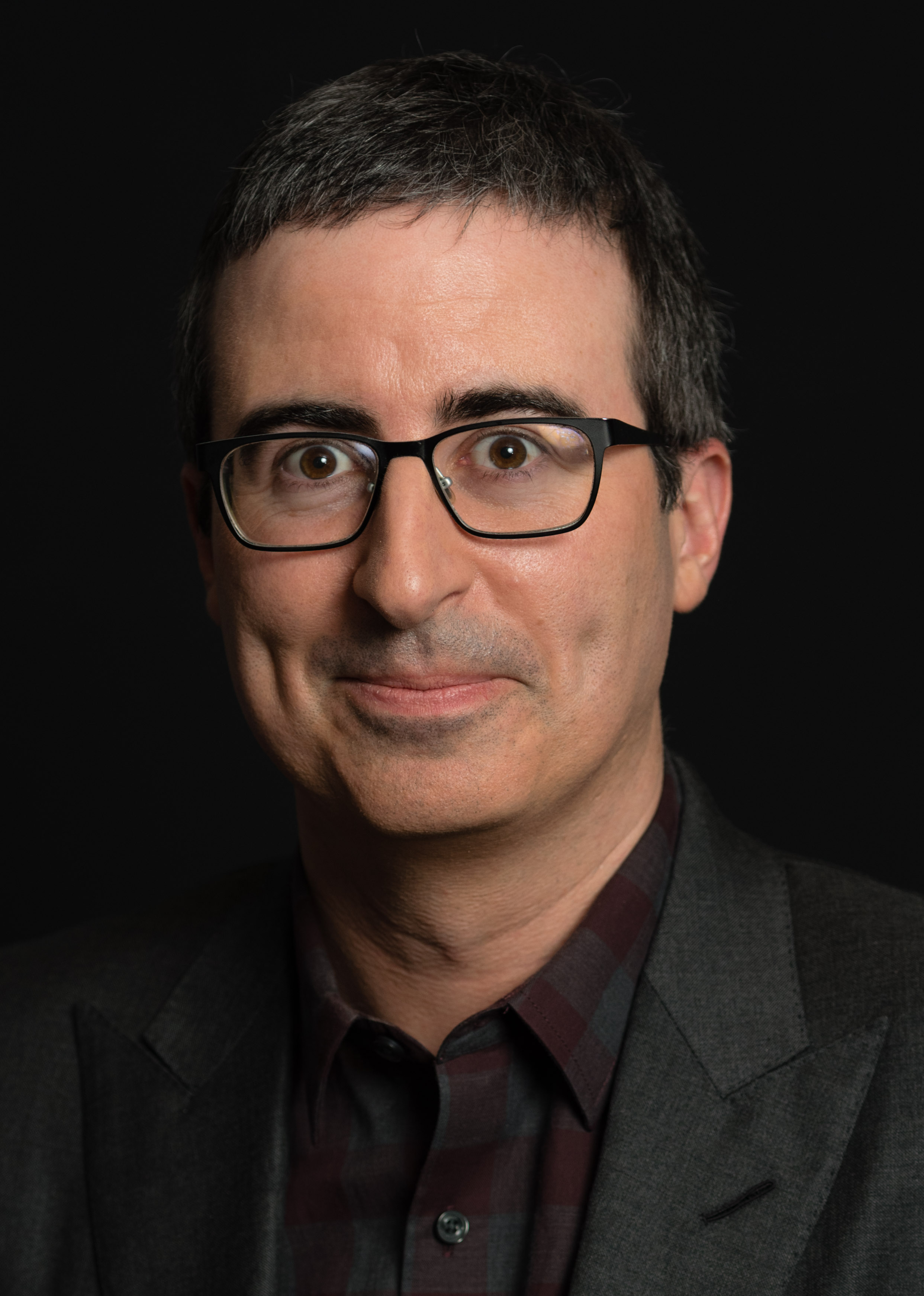
CNET said John Oliver (pictured in 2016) intended the episode to influence Americans to vote against Trump, who ultimately won the election.

Reviewing the segment, Daniel Victor of The New York Times said "Donald Drumpf" was "a funny label", but stated that the Trump family had changed its name in the 17th century, so the surname change could not be attributed to the presidential candidate. He also pointed out that many American entertainers and politicians, including Presidents Bill Clinton and Gerald Ford and rival presidential candidate Hillary Clinton, had changed their names. CNET's Chris Matyszczyk called the segment a "lengthy excoriation" of Trump and commented that Oliver's intents extended past "mere satire", influencing Americans to care enough to vote against Trump.

After the segment, a Twitterbot named "DeepDrumpf" was created at the Massachusetts Institute of Technology. Named after the Last Week Tonight segment, the bot uses neural network technology to post tweets in an imitation of Trump. The bot's creator stated that DeepDrumpf collects fragments of Trump's statements, noting their grammatical structure using artificial intelligence (AI), and outputs the resulting sentences based on what it learned about Trump's grammar style. The creator of the account also said that if there were more data available, or even all the data that Facebook's AI system can analyze, then the neural network would be better able to mimic Trump.

Within eight days of the original broadcast, the YouTube video of the segment surpassed 19 million views, making it Oliver's most watched segment. By comparison, the previous episode's main segment had a little over four million views on YouTube by that date. By the end of March, the segment had been viewed 23.3 million times on YouTube and 62 million times on Facebook, for a total of 85 million times on the two social media platforms, making its viewership "a record for any piece of HBO content".

By March 8, ten days after the episode's broadcast, the donaldjdrumpf.com website had sold over 35,000 "Make Donald Drumpf Again" hats, comprising all the inventory on hand. The Chrome extension had also been downloaded 433,000 times. (In November, shortly after Trump's election, Drumpf-cap manufacturer Unionwear filed for bankruptcy, though this had nothing to do directly with the manufacturing of these specific hats.)

Freelance journalist S. I. Rosenbaum, writing for the Washington Post, criticized Oliver's "Donald Drumpf" appellation as derisive of German Americans and other immigrant groups who anglicized their names upon immigration. Rosenbaum wrote that the phrase was reminiscent of Trump's own xenophobic statements in that it was part of a long-running trend of "bestowing foreign-sounding names to imply that the target isn't really an American." Oliver later said that the joke "got out of hand" and never used it on the show again. In an interview with Rolling Stone magazine, he said, "That joke became old for us very quickly. There's a reason we didn't use it again. It really is the song I skip past. It's 'Creep.' It's a good song, Thom Yorke! It was a good song when he wrote it." Alluding to the fact that the segment aired on the same night as the Oscars, the comedian also stated, "We were not doing [the episode] with the sense that it would become bigger than our show normally is", but the "Drumpf" appellation's later popularity "kind of slightly ruins the memory".

== Name change timing dispute ==
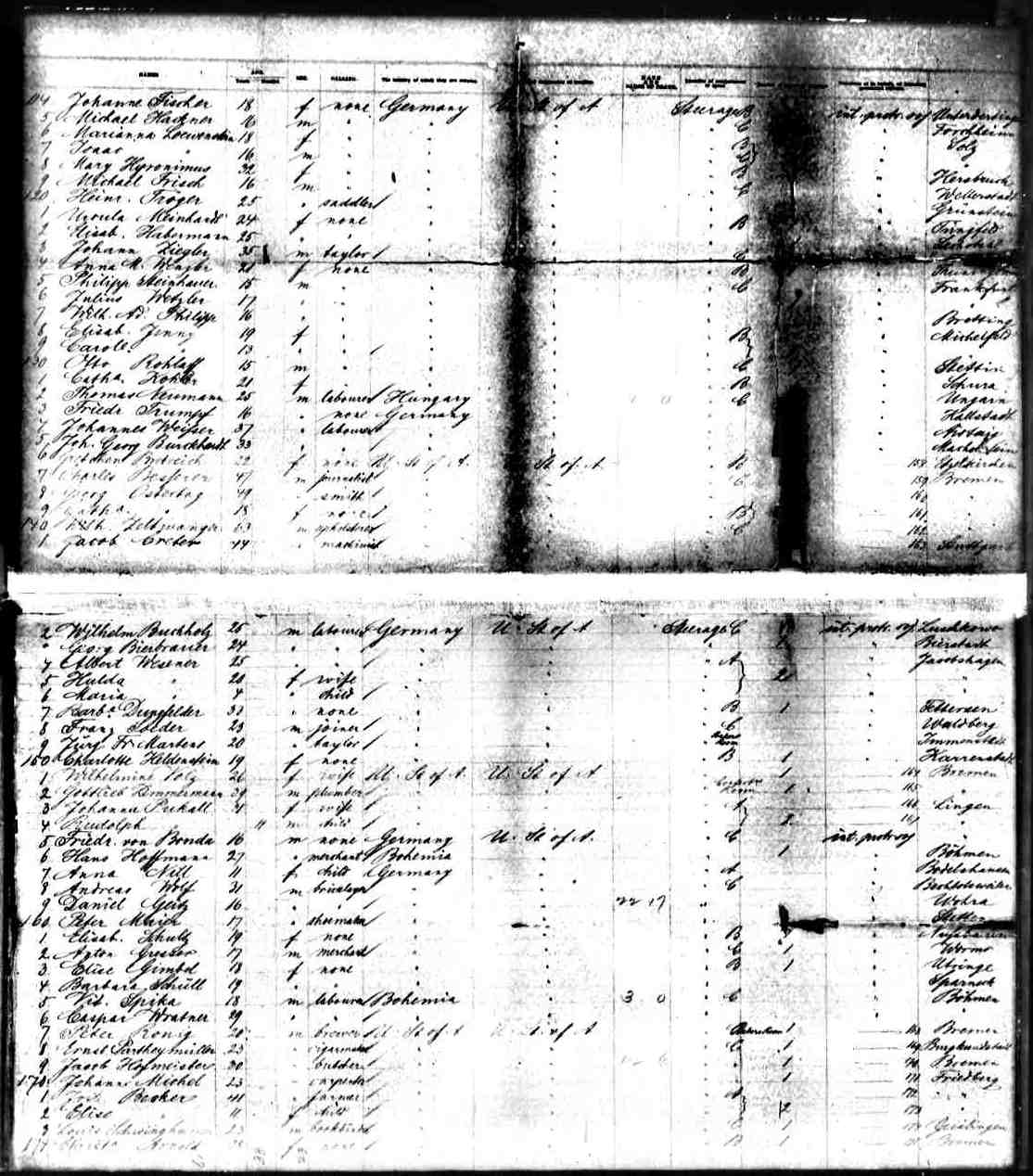
U.S. Immigration records from 1885 mention a "Friedr. Trumpf", age 16, born in Kallstadt, Germany. Frederick Trump, Donald Trump's grandfather, had immigrated to the United States that year.

While there was agreement among commentators that Drumpf was the Trumps' ancestral name, and that neither Donald Trump nor his father were named Drumpf, (Note: The claim is taken from Gwenda Blair's book The Trumps: Three Generations That Built an Empire (2001), page 26, where it is implied that the surname originates with one Hanns Drumpf, who was recorded in Kallstadt in 1608.) they disagreed on whether the family name was changed in the 17th century or well into the 19th century, when Trump's grandfather Frederick Trump immigrated to the United States. In their 2017 book Trump Revealed, Michael Kranish and Marc Fisher write that it is unknown when the "Trump" name was finalized. They further state that Trump family headstones in Kallstadt—the German village where Trump's grandfather was born—show various spellings of the family name "including Dromb, Drumb, Drumpf, Trum, Tromb, Tromp, Trumpf, and Trumpff". In U.S. immigration records from 1885, Friedrich's name is transcribed as "Friedr. Trumpf." the name under which he was processed when he entered the United States that year.

Kate Connolly of The Guardian, who visited Kallstadt, Germany (from where the Trump family emigrated) referred to Fred Trump, the father of Donald Trump, as "Friedrich Trump". She said that the town church's parish register contained multiple versions of the Trump name spanning 500 years, but did not mention the name "Drumpf". Genealogy organization FamilySearch provided information on Friedrich Trump, listing his father as Johann Ii Trump. Gwenda Blair, Trump's longtime biographer, appeared in an interview with Deutsche Welle in 2015, where she stated, "Donald's] grandfather Friedrich Drumpf came to the United States in 1885" when he was 16 years old and Germans were immigrating to America in large numbers. In September 2015, after the genealogical website Ancestry.com released the lineages of several famous families—including the Trump and Astor families—the New York Daily News claimed that Frederick Trump had been given the name "Friedrich Drumpf" upon his birth in Germany in 1869.

Other published sources said that the name change occurred in the 17th century. In the 2015 book The Trumps: Three Generations of Builders and a Presidential Candidate, an excerpt from which the John Oliver program used to cite the ancestral name disclosure for the segment, biographer Gwenda Blair wrote that the Trumps' family name was changed during the Thirty Years' War. She cited that one ancestor, named John Philip Trump, lived in the 17th century. Blair also wrote that Frederick Trump's original name was Friedrich Trump, and his father, born in the 19th century, was Johannes Trump. This position was endorsed by The Boston Globe, as well as by Daniel Victor, the New York Times reporter, who wrote, "Despite mistaken impressions, Mr. Trump and his recent relatives had nothing to do with the surname change. Mr. Oliver himself was careful to refer to a 'prescient ancestor'." A genealogist at Dotdash, which was then called About.com, listed Donald Trump's grandfather as Friederich Trump and great-grandfather as Christian Johannes Trump. In his 2013 book America's Obsessives: The Compulsive Energy That Built a Nation, Joshua Kendall wrote that Frederick's father and aunt, and by extension Donald Trump's great-grandfather and great-grandaunt, were called John Trump and Charlotte Luise Trump, respectively.

== See also ==
- 2016 in American television
