= La Paz traffic zebras =

Bolivian group of urban educators

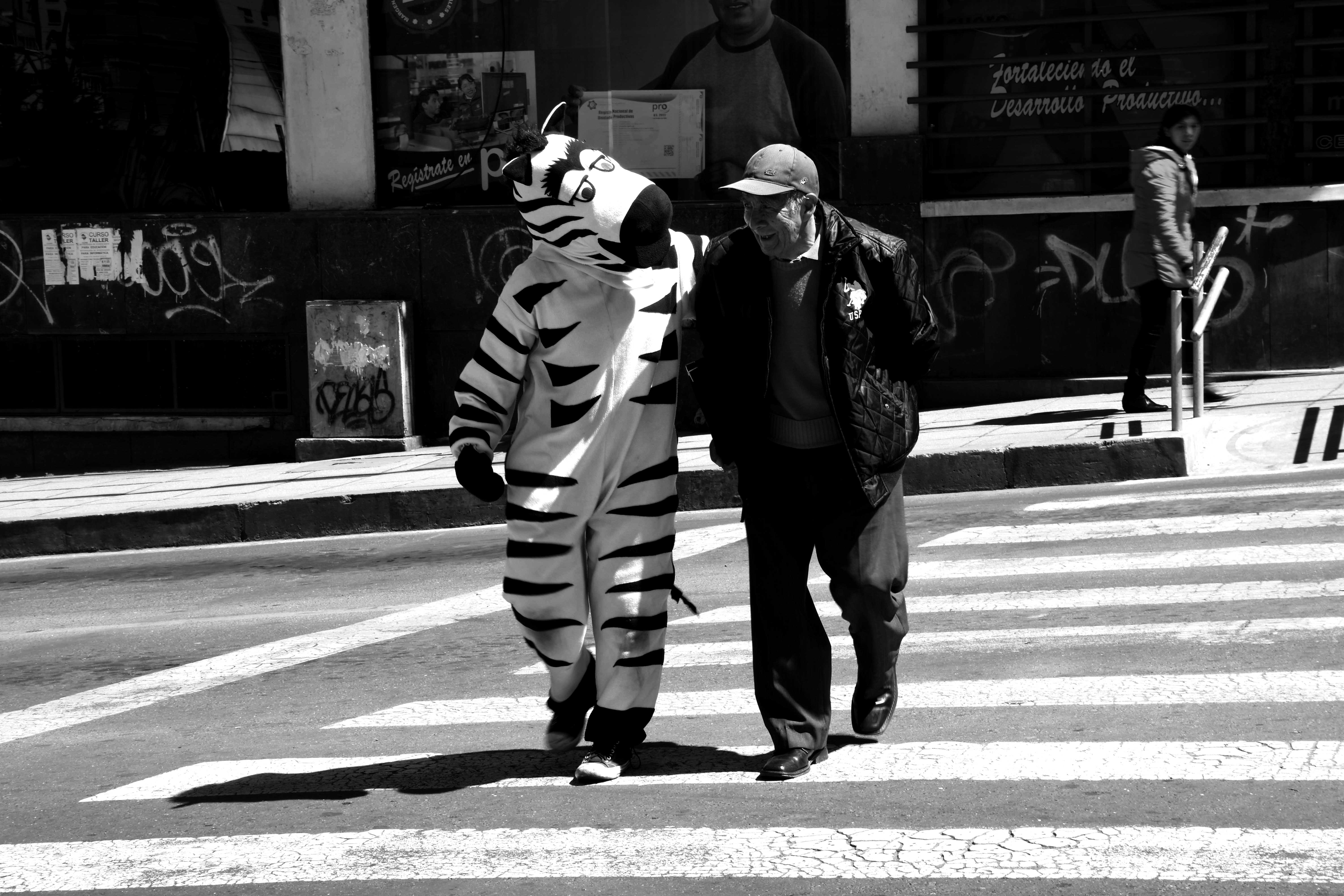
A costumed zebra character helping a man to cross the road

The La Paz traffic zebras, locally known as Educadores Urbanos Cebras ("Zebra Urban Educators"), are a group of "urban educators" dressed in one-piece zebra costumes. The "zebras", at-risk youth employed by the city government, work to calm traffic and educate citizens in road safety.

Founded in La Paz, Bolivia, the program has since expanded in scope and been implemented in several other Bolivian cities.

== Background ==
The La Paz traffic zebra program was founded in 2001, in response to growing traffic concerns caused by rural flight in Bolivia and the resulting increase in commuter traffic. Antanas Mockus, who founded a similar mime-based program in the 1990s as mayor of Bogotá, consulted with Pablo Groux on designing the traffic zebras. The zebras, or cebritas (a choice inspired by "zebra crossings", or "pasos de cebra"), were conceived of as a humorous way to educate citizens about road safety, on the theory that drivers might respond better to their mockery than to normal law enforcement.

The program initially employed just 24 "zebras", with two people in each zebra suit. These early zebras policed the streets, directing traffic with whistles and flags. As the program developed and grew, the suits were redesigned to single-person outfits which could navigate traffic more easily, and the zebras' techniques shifted more towards humor and encouragement.

== Program ==
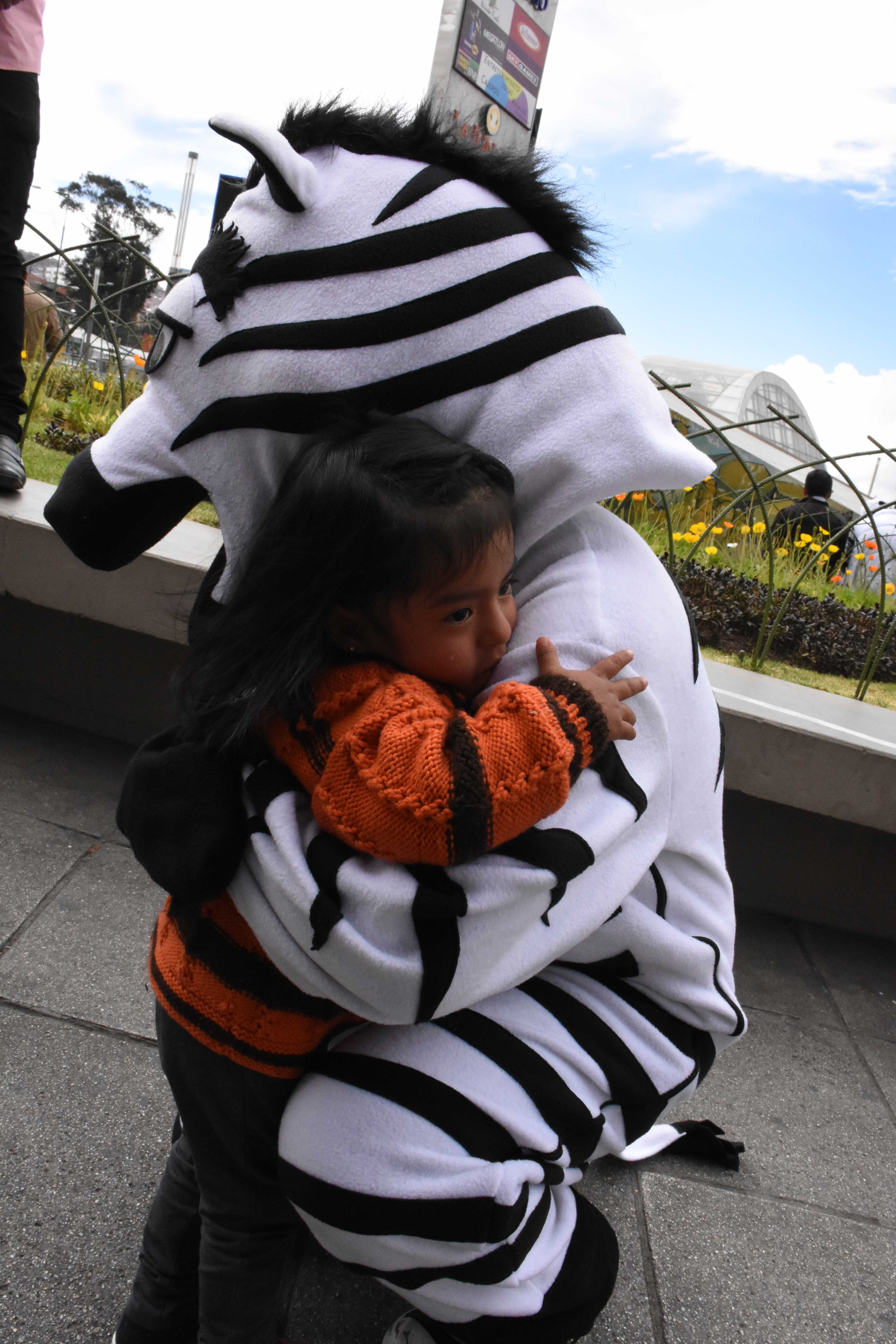
A costumed zebra character hugging a child

The traffic zebra program works with local youth organizations to employ at-risk teens and young adults. The young people, who are employed part-time by the La Paz city government, are given two months of training, paid the local minimum wage, and provided with health insurance. In addition, the program offers them access to classes, mentorship, and training in job skills for future employment. A "Zebra for a Day" ("Cebra Por Un Día") program also allows locals and tourists to try working as a traffic zebra.

Zebras encourage safe driving behavior at pedestrian crossings and traffic lights, often through antics like lying across the hood of a car stopped in a crosswalk, in addition to more standard methods like distributing leaflets and directing traffic. Their mission has expanded to include citizen education on topics besides road safety, such as recycling, water conservation, noise pollution, and bullying. Zebras make appearances at schools, hospitals, nursing homes, homeless shelters, television shows, and street festivals. In 2006, the program added "donkeys" as a negative counterpart to the friendly zebras; the donkeys were later discontinued.

As of 2017, the program had employed over 3000 local youth, at a rate of more than 250 each year. Sister programs in Tarija, Sucre, and El Alto bring the total number of zebras working at any given time to more than 400.

== Impact ==
The traffic zebras were declared a cultural asset by the city of La Paz in 2014, and by UNESCO in 2015. In 2016, they received the Guangzhou International Award for Urban Innovation in the "safe and accessible cities" category.

A children's book based on the La Paz traffic zebras, Mateo Y La Cebra Que Buscaba Un Paso de Peatones ("Mateo and the Zebra who was Looking for a Crosswalk"), was published in 2018. The zebras themselves have performed a similar play, "Mateo y su cebra" ("Mateo and his Zebra"), at local events. A national television show, "The Z", depicts the life of a young man who works as a traffic zebra.

In 2017, John Oliver featured the traffic zebras on his show Last Week Tonight, discussing their impact on the traffic in La Paz and inviting viewers to add videos of dancing zebras to unpleasant news stories. La Paz mayor Luis Revilla invited Oliver to visit the city and participate in the "Zebra for a Day" program, an invitation Oliver declined on-air in favor of dancing with a costumed zebra. In 2020, in collaboration with the United States Postal Service, Oliver released a sheet of stamps which included the zebras among other popular characters presented in the show.

== See also ==
- Crossing guard
- Zebra crossing
