= Results of the 2017 United Kingdom general election =

== Results by parliamentary constituency ==
The results of the 2017 United Kingdom general election, by parliamentary constituency were as follows:

Constituency	Cnty	Rgn	Last elctn	Winning party				Turnout (Note: Excludes spoilt ballots)	Votes													
Constituency	Cnty	Rgn	Last elctn	Party	Votes	Share	Mjrty.	Turnout	Con (Note: Excludes Speaker)	Lab (Note: Includes Labour Party and allied Co-operative Party)	LD	SNP	UKIP	Grn (Note: Includes Green Party of England and Wales, Scottish Green Party and Green Party in Northern Ireland)	DUP	SF	PC	SDLP	UUP	APNI	Other (Note: Includes all other parties, all independent candidates and the Speaker)	Total
Aberavon	WGM	WLS	Lab	Lab	22,662	68.1%	16,761	66.7%	5,901	22,662	599		1,345				2,761					33,268
Aberconwy	CON	WLS	Con	Con	14,337	44.6%	635	71.0%	14,337	13,702	941						3,170					32,150
Aberdeen North	SCT	SCT	SNP	SNP	15,170	41.3%	4,139	59.2%	8,341	11,031	1,693	15,170									522	36,757
Aberdeen South	SCT	SCT	SNP	Con	18,746	42.1%	4,752	68.5%	18,746	9,143	2,610	13,994										44,493
Airdrie and Shotts	SCT	SCT	SNP	SNP	14,291	37.6%	195	59.2%	8,813	14,096	802	14,291										38,002
Aldershot	HAM	SE	Con	Con	26,950	55.1%	11,473	64.2%	26,950	15,477	3,637		1,796	1,090								48,950
Aldridge-Brownhills	WMD	WM	Con	Con	26,317	65.4%	14,307	66.7%	26,317	12,010	1,343										565	40,235
Altrincham and Sale West	GTM	NW	Con	Con	26,933	51.0%	6,426	72.1%	26,933	20,507	4,051			1,000							299	52,790
Alyn and Deeside	CON	WLS	Lab	Lab	23,315	52.1%	5,235	71.0%	18,080	23,315	1,077		1,117				1,171					44,760
Amber Valley	DBY	EM	Con	Con	25,905	56.5%	8,300	67.3%	25,905	17,605	1,100			650							551	45,811
Angus	SCT	SCT	SNP	Con	18,148	45.2%	2,645	63.0%	18,148	5,233	1,308	15,503										40,192
Arfon	GWN	WLS	PC	PC	11,519	40.8%	92	68.2%	4,614	11,427	648						11,519					28,208
Argyll and Bute	SCT	SCT	SNP	SNP	17,304	36.0%	1,328	71.5%	15,976	6,044	8,745	17,304										48,069
Arundel and South Downs	WSX	SE	Con	Con	37,573	62.4%	23,883	75.8%	37,573	13,690	4,783		1,668	2,542								60,256
Ashfield	NTT	EM	Lab	Lab	21,285	42.6%	441	64.0%	20,844	21,285	969		1,885	398							4,612	49,993
Ashford	KEN	SE	Con	Con	35,318	59.0%	17,478	68.5%	35,318	17,840	3,101		2,218	1,402								59,879
Ashton-under-Lyne	GTM	NW	Lab	Lab	24,005	60.4%	11,295	60.5%	12,710	24,005	646		1,878	534								39,773
Aylesbury	BKM	SE	Con	Con	32,313	55.0%	14,656	71.2%	32,313	17,657	5,660		1,296	1,237							620	58,783
Ayr, Carrick and Cumnock	SCT	SCT	SNP	Con	18,550	40.1%	2,774	64.9%	18,550	11,024	872	15,776										46,222
Banbury	OXF	SE	Con	Con	33,388	54.2%	12,399	73.4%	33,388	20,989	3,452		1,581	1,225							927	61,562
Banff and Buchan	SCT	SCT	SNP	Con	19,976	48.0%	3,693	61.6%	19,976	3,936	1,448	16,283										41,643
Barking	LND	LND	Lab	Lab	32,319	67.8%	21,608	61.9%	10,711	32,319	599		3,031	724							295	47,679
Barnsley Central	SYK	YTH	Lab	Lab	24,982	63.9%	15,546	60.9%	9,436	24,982	549		3,339	570							211	39,087
Barnsley East	SYK	YTH	Lab	Lab	24,280	59.5%	13,283	58.9%	10,997	24,280	750		3,247								1,502	40,776
Barrow and Furness	CMA	NW	Lab	Lab	22,592	47.5%	209	68.5%	22,383	22,592	1,278		962	375								47,590
Basildon and Billericay	ESS	E	Con	Con	27,381	61.0%	13,400	65.0%	27,381	13,981	1,548		2,008									44,918
Basingstoke	HAM	SE	Con	Con	29,510	52.7%	9,466	68.3%	29,510	20,044	3,406		1,681	1,106							213	55,960
Bassetlaw	NTT	EM	Lab	Lab	27,467	52.6%	4,852	66.5%	22,615	27,467	1,154										1,014	52,250
Bath	AVN	SW	Con	LD	23,436	47.3%	5,694	74.3%	17,742	7,279	23,436			1,126								49,583
Batley and Spen	WYK	YTH	Lab	Lab	29,844	55.5%	8,961	67.1%	20,883	29,844	1,224			695							1,134	53,780
Battersea	LND	LND	Con	Lab	25,292	45.9%	2,416	71.0%	22,876	25,292	4,401		357	866							1,266	55,058
Beaconsfield	BKM	SE	Con	Con	36,559	65.3%	24,543	72.3%	36,559	12,016	4,448		1,609	1,396								56,028
Beckenham	LND	LND	Con	Con	30,632	59.3%	15,087	76.0%	30,632	15,545	4,073			1,380								51,630
Bedford	BDF	E	Con	Lab	22,712	46.8%	789	67.5%	21,923	22,712	2,837			1,008								48,480
Belfast East	NIR	NIR	DUP	DUP	23,917	55.8%	8,474	67.5%	446					561	23,917	894		167	1,408	15,443	54	42,890
Belfast North	NIR	NIR	DUP	DUP	21,240	46.2%	2,081	67.3%						644	21,240	19,159		2,058		2,475	360	45,936
Belfast South	NIR	NIR	SDLP	DUP	13,299	30.4%	1,996	66.1%	246					2,241	13,299	7,143		11,303	1,527	7,946		43,705
Belfast West	NIR	NIR	SF	SF	27,107	66.7%	21,652	65.1%							5,455	27,107		2,860		731	4,480	40,633
Bermondsey and Old Southwark	LND	LND	Lab	Lab	31,161	53.2%	12,972	67.0%	7,581	31,161	18,189		838	639							113	58,521
Berwickshire, Roxburgh and Selkirk	SCT	SCT	SNP	Con	28,213	53.9%	11,060	71.5%	28,213	4,519	2,482	17,153										52,367
Berwick-upon-Tweed	NBL	NE	Con	Con	22,145	52.5%	11,781	71.8%	22,145	10,364	8,916			787								42,212
Bethnal Green and Bow	LND	LND	Lab	Lab	42,969	71.8%	35,393	69.5%	7,576	42,969	2,982		894	1,516							3,888	59,825
Beverley and Holderness	HUM	YTH	Con	Con	32,499	58.4%	14,042	69.0%	32,499	18,457	2,808			716							1,158	55,638
Bexhill and Battle	SXE	SE	Con	Con	36,854	62.0%	22,165	73.1%	36,854	14,689	4,485		2,006	1,438								59,472
Bexleyheath and Crayford	LND	LND	Con	Con	25,113	55.6%	9,073	69.2%	25,113	16,040	1,201		1,944	601							290	45,189
Birkenhead	MSY	NW	Lab	Lab	33,558	76.9%	25,514	67.7%	8,044	33,558	1,118			943								43,663
Birmingham Edgbaston	WMD	WM	Lab	Lab	24,124	55.3%	6,917	64.0%	17,207	24,124	1,564			562							155	43,612
Birmingham Erdington	WMD	WM	Lab	Lab	21,571	58.0%	7,285	57.2%	14,286	21,571	750			610								37,217
Birmingham Hall Green	WMD	WM	Lab	Lab	42,143	77.6%	33,944	69.4%	8,199	42,143	3,137			831								54,310
Birmingham Hodge Hill	WMD	WM	Lab	Lab	37,606	81.1%	31,026	61.3%	6,580	37,606	805		1,016	387								46,394
Birmingham Ladywood	WMD	WM	Lab	Lab	34,166	82.7%	28,714	59.0%	5,452	34,166	1,156			533								41,307
Birmingham Northfield	WMD	WM	Lab	Lab	23,596	53.2%	4,667	61.3%	18,929	23,596	959			864								44,348
Birmingham Perry Barr	WMD	WM	Lab	Lab	30,109	68.1%	18,383	63.0%	11,726	30,109	1,080			591							691	44,197
Birmingham Selly Oak	WMD	WM	Lab	Lab	30,836	62.9%	15,207	65.9%	15,629	30,836	1,644			876								48,985
Birmingham Yardley	WMD	WM	Lab	Lab	25,398	57.1%	16,574	61.3%	8,824	25,398	7,984		1,916	280							100	44,502
Bishop Auckland	DUR	NE	Lab	Lab	20,808	48.1%	502	64.0%	20,306	20,808	1,176										991	43,281
Blackburn	LAN	NW	Lab	Lab	33,148	69.8%	20,368	67.2%	12,780	33,148	709										878	47,515
Blackley and Broughton	GTM	NW	Lab	Lab	28,258	70.4%	19,601	56.0%	8,657	28,258	737		1,825	462							174	40,113
Blackpool North and Cleveleys	LAN	NW	Con	Con	20,255	49.4%	2,023	64.1%	20,255	18,232	747		1,392	381								41,007
Blackpool South	LAN	NW	Lab	Lab	17,581	50.3%	2,523	59.8%	15,058	17,581	634		1,339	341								34,953
Blaenau Gwent	GNT	WLS	Lab	Lab	18,787	58.0%	11,907	63.2%	4,783	18,787	295		973				6,880				666	32,384
Blaydon	TWR	NE	Lab	Lab	26,979	56.1%	13,477	70.2%	13,502	26,979	4,366		2,459	583							195	48,084
Blyth Valley	NBL	NE	Lab	Lab	23,770	55.9%	7,915	67.0%	15,855	23,770	1,947			918								42,490
Bognor Regis and Littlehampton	WSX	SE	Con	Con	30,276	59.0%	17,494	67.7%	30,276	12,782	3,352		1,861	993							2,088	51,352
Bolsover	DBY	EM	Lab	Lab	24,153	51.9%	5,288	63.4%	18,865	24,153	1,372		2,129									46,519
Bolton North East	GTM	NW	Lab	Lab	22,870	50.6%	3,797	67.2%	19,073	22,870	1,316		1,567	357								45,183
Bolton South East	GTM	NW	Lab	Lab	25,676	60.7%	13,126	61.4%	12,550	25,676	781		2,779	537								42,323
Bolton West	GTM	NW	Con	Con	24,459	47.9%	936	70.1%	24,459	23,523	1,485		1,587									51,054
Bootle	MSY	NW	Lab	Lab	42,259	84.0%	36,200	69.0%	6,059	42,259	837			709							424	50,288
Boston and Skegness	LIN	EM	Con	Con	27,271	63.6%	16,572	62.7%	27,271	10,699	771		3,308	547							283	42,879
Bosworth	LEI	EM	Con	Con	31,864	56.7%	18,351	68.8%	31,864	13,513	9,744			1,047								56,168
Bournemouth East	DOR	SW	Con	Con	25,221	51.9%	7,937	65.2%	25,221	17,284	3,168		1,405	1,236							304	48,618
Bournemouth West	DOR	SW	Con	Con	23,812	53.5%	7,711	60.8%	23,812	16,101	2,929			1,247							418	44,507
Bracknell	BRK	SE	Con	Con	32,882	58.8%	16,016	70.6%	32,882	16,866	4,186		1,521								437	55,892
Bradford East	WYK	YTH	Lab	Lab	29,831	65.4%	20,540	64.8%	9,291	29,831	843		1,372	289							3,996	45,622
Bradford South	WYK	YTH	Lab	Lab	22,364	54.5%	6,700	60.6%	15,664	22,364	516		1,758	370							377	41,049
Bradford West	WYK	YTH	Lab	Lab	29,444	64.7%	21,902	67.4%	7,542	29,444	712		885	481							6,464	45,528
Braintree	ESS	E	Con	Con	32,873	62.8%	18,422	69.5%	32,873	14,451	2,251		1,835	916								52,326
Brecon and Radnorshire	POW	WLS	Con	Con	20,081	48.6%	8,038	73.8%	20,081	7,335	12,043		576				1,299					41,334
Brent Central	LND	LND	Lab	Lab	38,208	73.1%	27,997	65.0%	10,211	38,208	2,519		556	802								52,296
Brent North	LND	LND	Lab	Lab	35,496	62.9%	17,061	68.4%	18,435	35,496	1,614			660							239	56,444
Brentford and Isleworth	LND	LND	Lab	Lab	35,364	57.4%	12,182	72.4%	23,182	35,364	3,083											61,629
Brentwood and Ongar	ESS	E	Con	Con	34,811	65.8%	24,002	70.5%	34,811	10,809	4,426		1,845	915							104	52,910
Bridgend	MGM	WLS	Lab	Lab	21,913	50.7%	4,700	69.6%	17,213	21,913	919		781				1,783				646	43,255
Bridgwater and West Somerset	SOM	SW	Con	Con	32,111	55.1%	15,448	65.3%	32,111	16,663	6,332		2,102	1,059								58,267
Brigg and Goole	HUM	YTH	Con	Con	27,219	60.4%	12,363	68.2%	27,219	14,856	836		1,596	550								45,057
Brighton Kemptown	SXE	SE	Con	Lab	28,703	58.3%	9,868	72.5%	18,835	28,703	1,457										212	49,207
Brighton Pavilion	SXE	SE	Grn	Grn	30,149	52.3%	14,699	76.4%	11,082	15,450			630	30,149							376	57,687
Bristol East	AVN	SW	Lab	Lab	30,847	60.7%	13,394	70.1%	17,453	30,847	1,389			1,110								50,799
Bristol North West	AVN	SW	Con	Lab	27,400	50.7%	4,761	71.7%	22,639	27,400	2,814			1,243								54,096
Bristol South	AVN	SW	Lab	Lab	32,666	60.1%	15,987	65.5%	16,679	32,666	1,821		1,672	1,428							116	54,382
Bristol West	AVN	SW	Lab	Lab	47,213	65.9%	37,336	77.0%	9,877	47,213	5,201			9,216							101	71,608
Broadland	NFK	E	Con	Con	32,406	57.9%	15,816	72.4%	32,406	16,590	4,449		1,594	932								55,971
Bromley and Chislehurst	LND	LND	Con	Con	25,175	54.0%	9,590	71.7%	25,175	15,585	3,369		1,383	1,150								46,662
Bromsgrove	HWR	WM	Con	Con	33,493	62.0%	16,573	73.5%	33,493	16,920	2,488			1,139								54,040
Broxbourne	HRT	E	Con	Con	29,515	62.2%	15,792	64.6%	29,515	13,723	1,481		1,918	848								47,485
Broxtowe	NTT	EM	Con	Con	25,983	46.8%	863	75.0%	25,983	25,120	2,247		1,477	681								55,508
Buckingham	BKM	SE	Spkr	Spkr	34,299	65.1%	25,725	66.2%					4,168	8,574							39,937	52,679
Burnley	LAN	NW	Lab	Lab	18,832	46.7%	6,353	62.3%	12,479	18,832	6,046		2,472	461								40,290
Burton	STS	WM	Con	Con	28,936	58.0%	10,047	67.5%	28,936	18,889	1,262			824								49,911
Bury North	GTM	NW	Con	Lab	25,683	53.6%	4,375	70.9%	21,308	25,683	912											47,903
Bury South	GTM	NW	Lab	Lab	27,165	53.3%	5,965	69.2%	21,200	27,165	1,065		1,316								244	50,990
Bury St Edmunds	SFK	E	Con	Con	36,794	59.2%	18,441	72.2%	36,794	18,353	3,565			2,596							852	62,160
Caerphilly	GNT	WLS	Lab	Lab	22,491	54.5%	12,078	64.1%	10,413	22,491	725		1,259	447			5,962					41,297
Caithness, Sutherland and Easter Ross	SCT	SCT	SNP	LD	11,061	35.8%	2,044	65.9%	6,990	3,833	11,061	9,017										30,901
Calder Valley	WYK	YTH	Con	Con	26,790	46.1%	609	73.4%	26,790	26,181	1,952		1,466	631							1,034	58,054
Camberwell and Peckham	LND	LND	Lab	Lab	44,665	77.8%	37,316	67.1%	7,349	44,665	3,413			1,627							358	57,412
Camborne and Redruth	CUL	SW	Con	Con	23,001	47.5%	1,577	70.8%	23,001	21,424	2,979			1,052								48,456
Cambridge	CAM	E	Lab	Lab	29,032	51.9%	12,661	71.2%	9,133	29,032	16,371			1,265							133	55,934
Cannock Chase	STS	WM	Con	Con	26,318	55.0%	8,391	64.2%	26,318	17,927	794		2,018	815								47,872
Canterbury	KEN	SE	Con	Lab	25,572	45.0%	187	72.7%	25,385	25,572	4,561			1,282								56,800
Cardiff Central	SGM	WLS	Lab	Lab	25,193	62.4%	17,196	68.1%	7,997	25,193	5,415		343	420			999					40,367
Cardiff North	SGM	WLS	Con	Lab	26,081	50.1%	4,174	77.4%	21,907	26,081	1,714		582				1,738					52,022
Cardiff South and Penarth	SGM	WLS	Lab	Lab	30,182	59.5%	14,864	66.3%	15,318	30,182	1,430		942	532			2,162				170	50,736
Cardiff West	SGM	WLS	Lab	Lab	26,425	56.7%	12,551	69.8%	13,874	26,425	1,214		698				4,418					46,629
Carlisle	CMA	NW	Con	Con	21,472	49.9%	2,599	69.1%	21,472	18,873	1,256		1,455									43,056
Carmarthen East and Dinefwr	DFD	WLS	PC	PC	16,127	39.3%	3,908	73.3%	10,778	12,219	920		985				16,127					41,029
Carmarthen West and South Pembrokeshire	DFD	WLS	Con	Con	19,771	46.8%	3,110	72.1%	19,771	16,661	956		905				3,933					42,226
Carshalton and Wallington	LND	LND	LD	LD	20,819	41.0%	1,369	71.6%	19,450	9,360	20,819			501							623	50,753
Castle Point	ESS	E	Con	Con	30,076	67.3%	18,872	64.4%	30,076	11,204	1,049		2,381									44,710
Central Ayrshire	SCT	SCT	SNP	SNP	16,771	37.2%	1,267	65.3%	15,504	11,762	1,050	16,771										45,087
Central Devon	DEV	SW	Con	Con	31,278	54.1%	15,680	77.8%	31,278	15,598	6,770		1,326	1,531							1,341	57,844
Central Suffolk and North Ipswich	SFK	E	Con	Con	33,992	60.1%	17,185	72.4%	33,992	16,807	2,431		1,635	1,659								56,524
Ceredigion	DFD	WLS	LD	PC	11,623	29.2%	104	73.3%	7,307	8,017	11,519		602	542			11,623				157	39,767
Charnwood	LEI	EM	Con	Con	33,318	60.4%	16,341	70.7%	33,318	16,977	2,052		1,471	1,036							322	55,176
Chatham and Aylesford	KEN	SE	Con	Con	25,587	57.0%	10,458	63.7%	25,587	15,129	1,116		2,225	573							260	44,890
Cheadle	GTM	NW	Con	Con	24,331	44.6%	4,507	74.3%	24,331	10,417	19,824											54,572
Chelmsford	ESS	E	Con	Con	30,525	53.7%	13,572	70.2%	30,525	16,953	6,916		1,645	821								56,860
Chelsea and Fulham	LND	LND	Con	Con	22,179	52.6%	8,188	66.1%	22,179	13,991	4,627		524	807								42,128
Cheltenham	GLS	SW	Con	Con	26,615	46.7%	2,569	72.3%	26,615	5,408	24,046			943								57,012
Chesham and Amersham	BKM	SE	Con	Con	33,514	60.7%	22,140	77.1%	33,514	11,374	7,179		1,525	1,660								55,252
Chesterfield	DBY	EM	Lab	Lab	26,266	54.8%	9,605	66.5%	16,661	26,266	2,612		1,611	777								47,927
Chichester	WSX	SE	Con	Con	36,032	60.1%	22,621	70.5%	36,032	13,411	6,749		1,650	1,992							84	59,918
Chingford and Woodford Green	LND	LND	Con	Con	23,076	49.1%	2,438	71.2%	23,076	20,638	2,043			1,204								46,961
Chippenham	WIL	SW	Con	Con	31,267	54.7%	16,630	74.8%	31,267	11,236	14,637											57,140
Chipping Barnet	LND	LND	Con	Con	25,679	46.3%	353	71.8%	25,679	25,326	3,012			1,406								55,423
Chorley	LAN	NW	Lab	Lab	30,745	55.3%	7,512	72.8%	23,233	30,745	1,126			530								55,634
Christchurch	DOR	SW	Con	Con	35,230	69.6%	25,171	72.0%	35,230	10,059	4,020			1,325								50,634
Cities of London and Westminster	LND	LND	Con	Con	18,005	46.6%	3,148	62.8%	18,005	14,857	4,270		426	821							275	38,654
City of Chester	CHS	NW	Lab	Lab	32,023	56.8%	9,176	77.4%	22,847	32,023	1,551											56,421
City of Durham	DUR	NE	Lab	Lab	26,772	55.4%	12,364	67.9%	14,408	26,772	4,787		1,116	797							444	48,324
Clacton	ESS	E	UKIP	Con	27,031	61.2%	15,828	64.4%	27,031	11,203	887		3,357	719							948	44,145
Cleethorpes	HUM	YTH	Con	Con	27,321	57.1%	10,400	65.8%	27,321	16,921	1,110		2,022	470								47,844
Clwyd South	CON	WLS	Lab	Lab	19,002	50.7%	4,356	69.7%	14,646	19,002	731		802				2,293					37,474
Clwyd West	CON	WLS	Con	Con	19,541	48.1%	3,437	69.8%	19,541	16,104	1,091						3,918					40,654
Coatbridge, Chryston and Bellshill	SCT	SCT	SNP	Lab	19,193	42.6%	1,586	63.3%	7,318	19,193	922	17,607										45,040
Colchester	ESS	E	Con	Con	24,565	45.9%	5,677	66.9%	24,565	18,888	9,087			828							177	53,545
Colne Valley	WYK	YTH	Con	Lab	28,818	47.7%	915	71.6%	27,903	28,818	2,494			892							313	60,420
Congleton	CHS	NW	Con	Con	31,830	56.6%	12,619	73.3%	31,830	19,211	2,902		1,289	999								56,231
Copeland	CMA	NW	Lab	Con	21,062	49.1%	1,695	69.5%	21,062	19,367	1,404		1,094									42,927
Corby	NTH	EM	Con	Con	29,534	49.2%	2,690	72.3%	29,534	26,844	1,545		1,495	579								59,997
Coventry North East	WMD	WM	Lab	Lab	29,499	63.4%	15,580	61.4%	13,919	29,499	1,157		1,350	502							81	46,508
Coventry North West	WMD	WM	Lab	Lab	26,894	54.0%	8,580	66.3%	18,314	26,894	1,286		1,525	666							1,164	49,849
Coventry South	WMD	WM	Lab	Lab	25,874	55.0%	7,947	66.5%	17,927	25,874	1,343		1,037	604							224	47,009
Crawley	WSX	SE	Con	Con	25,426	50.6%	2,457	68.5%	25,426	22,969	1,878											50,273
Crewe and Nantwich	CHS	NW	Con	Lab	25,928	47.1%	48	69.7%	25,880	25,928	1,334		1,885									55,027
Croydon Central	LND	LND	Con	Lab	29,873	52.3%	5,652	71.3%	24,221	29,873	1,083		1,040	626							248	57,091
Croydon North	LND	LND	Lab	Lab	44,213	74.2%	32,365	68.2%	11,848	44,213	1,656		753	983							170	59,623
Croydon South	LND	LND	Con	Con	33,334	54.4%	11,406	73.3%	33,334	21,928	3,541		1,116	1,125							213	61,257
Cumbernauld, Kilsyth and Kirkintilloch East	SCT	SCT	SNP	SNP	19,122	43.6%	4,264	65.9%	8,010	14,858	1,238	19,122	605									43,833
Cynon Valley	MGM	WLS	Lab	Lab	19,404	61.0%	13,238	62.0%	6,166	19,404	585		1,271				4,376					31,802
Dagenham and Rainham	LND	LND	Lab	Lab	22,958	50.1%	4,652	64.9%	18,306	22,958	465		3,246	544							324	45,843
Darlington	DUR	NE	Lab	Lab	22,681	50.6%	3,280	67.6%	19,401	22,681	1,031		1,180	524								44,817
Dartford	KEN	SE	Con	Con	31,210	57.6%	13,186	69.1%	31,210	18,024	1,428		2,544	807							211	54,224
Daventry	NTH	EM	Con	Con	35,464	63.7%	21,734	74.0%	35,464	13,730	4,015		1,497	957								55,663
Delyn	CON	WLS	Lab	Lab	20,573	52.2%	4,240	72.9%	16,333	20,573	1,031						1,481					39,418
Denton and Reddish	GTM	NW	Lab	Lab	25,161	63.5%	14,077	58.5%	11,084	25,161	853		1,798	486							217	39,599
Derby North	DBY	EM	Con	Lab	23,622	48.5%	2,015	69.6%	21,607	23,622	2,262		1,181									48,672
Derby South	DBY	EM	Lab	Lab	26,430	58.3%	11,248	64.8%	15,182	26,430	1,229		2,011	454								45,306
Derbyshire Dales	DBY	EM	Con	Con	29,744	60.0%	14,327	76.9%	29,744	15,417	3,126			1,002							282	49,571
Devizes	WIL	SW	Con	Con	31,744	62.7%	21,136	70.1%	31,744	10,608	4,706		1,706	1,606							223	50,593
Dewsbury	WYK	YTH	Lab	Lab	28,814	51.0%	3,321	69.5%	25,493	28,814	1,214			1,024								56,545
Don Valley	SYK	YTH	Lab	Lab	24,351	53.0%	5,169	62.2%	19,182	24,351	856										1,599	45,988
Doncaster Central	SYK	YTH	Lab	Lab	24,915	57.9%	10,131	60.0%	14,784	24,915	973										2,352	43,024
Doncaster North	SYK	YTH	Lab	Lab	25,711	60.8%	14,024	58.5%	11,687	25,711	706		2,738								1,470	42,312
Dover	KEN	SE	Con	Con	27,211	52.4%	6,437	69.7%	27,211	20,774	1,336		1,722	923								51,966
Dudley North	WMD	WM	Lab	Lab	18,090	46.5%	22	62.7%	18,068	18,090	368		2,144	240								38,910
Dudley South	WMD	WM	Con	Con	21,588	56.4%	7,730	62.4%	21,588	13,858	625		1,791	382								38,244
Dulwich and West Norwood	LND	LND	Lab	Lab	39,096	69.6%	28,156	71.9%	10,940	39,096	4,475			1,408							224	56,143
Dumfries and Galloway	SCT	SCT	SNP	Con	22,344	43.3%	5,643	69.5%	22,344	10,775	1,241	16,701									538	51,599
Dumfriesshire, Clydesdale and Tweeddale	SCT	SCT	Con	Con	24,177	49.4%	9,441	72.4%	24,177	8,102	1,949	14,736										48,964
Dundee East	SCT	SCT	SNP	SNP	18,391	42.8%	6,645	65.2%	11,746	11,176	1,615	18,391										42,928
Dundee West	SCT	SCT	SNP	SNP	18,045	46.7%	5,262	61.7%	6,257	12,783	1,189	18,045									403	38,677
Dunfermline and West Fife	SCT	SCT	SNP	SNP	18,121	35.5%	844	67.4%	12,593	17,277	3,019	18,121										51,010
Dwyfor Meirionnydd	GWN	WLS	PC	PC	13,687	45.1%	4,850	67.9%	8,837	6,273	937		614				13,687					30,348
Ealing Central and Acton	LND	LND	Lab	Lab	33,037	59.7%	13,807	74.6%	19,230	33,037	3,075											55,342
Ealing North	LND	LND	Lab	Lab	34,635	66.0%	19,693	70.2%	14,942	34,635	1,275		921	743								52,516
Ealing Southall	LND	LND	Lab	Lab	31,720	70.3%	22,090	69.3%	9,630	31,720	1,892		504	1,037							362	45,145
Easington	DUR	NE	Lab	Lab	23,152	63.7%	14,892	58.3%	8,260	23,152	460		1,727	410							2,355	36,364
East Antrim	NIR	NIR	DUP	DUP	21,873	57.3%	15,923	60.6%	963						21,873	3,555		1,278	4,524	5,950		38,143
East Devon	DEV	SW	Con	Con	29,306	48.5%	8,036	73.3%	29,306	6,857	1,468		1,203								21,548	60,382
East Dunbartonshire	SCT	SCT	SNP	LD	21,023	40.6%	5,339	78.1%	7,563	7,531	21,023	15,684										51,801
East Ham	LND	LND	Lab	Lab	47,124	83.2%	39,883	67.5%	7,241	47,124	656		697	474							441	56,633
East Hampshire	HAM	SE	Con	Con	35,263	63.6%	25,852	74.7%	35,263	9,411	8,403			1,760							571	55,408
East Kilbride, Strathaven and Lesmahagow	SCT	SCT	SNP	SNP	21,023	38.9%	3,866	67.3%	13,704	17,157	1,590	21,023	628									54,102
East Londonderry	NIR	NIR	DUP	DUP	19,723	48.1%	8,842	61.2%	330						19,723	10,881		4,423	3,135	2,538		41,030
East Lothian	SCT	SCT	SNP	Lab	20,158	36.1%	3,083	70.6%	16,540	20,158	1,738	17,075									367	55,878
East Renfrewshire	SCT	SCT	SNP	Con	21,496	40.0%	4,712	76.7%	21,496	14,346	1,112	16,784										53,738
East Surrey	SRY	SE	Con	Con	35,310	59.6%	23,914	72.2%	35,310	11,396	6,197		2,227	1,100							2,973	59,203
East Worthing and Shoreham	WSX	SE	Con	Con	25,988	48.9%	5,106	70.3%	25,988	20,882	2,523		1,444	1,273							1,007	53,117
East Yorkshire	HUM	YTH	Con	Con	31,442	58.3%	15,006	66.6%	31,442	16,436	2,134		1,986	943							1,015	53,956
Eastbourne	SXE	SE	Con	LD	26,924	46.9%	1,609	72.9%	25,315	4,671	26,924			510								57,420
Eastleigh	HAM	SE	Con	Con	28,889	50.4%	14,179	70.5%	28,889	11,454	14,710		1,477	750								57,280
Eddisbury	CHS	NW	Con	Con	29,192	56.9%	11,942	73.0%	29,192	17,250	2,804		1,109	785							179	51,319
Edinburgh East	SCT	SCT	SNP	SNP	18,509	42.5%	3,425	66.0%	8,081	15,084	1,849	18,509										43,523
Edinburgh North and Leith	SCT	SCT	SNP	SNP	19,243	34.0%	1,625	71.2%	15,385	17,618	2,579	19,243		1,727								56,552
Edinburgh South	SCT	SCT	Lab	Lab	26,269	54.9%	15,514	74.1%	9,428	26,269	1,388	10,755										47,840
Edinburgh South West	SCT	SCT	SNP	SNP	17,575	35.6%	1,097	69.4%	16,478	13,213	2,124	17,575										49,390
Edinburgh West	SCT	SCT	SNP	LD	18,108	34.3%	2,988	73.8%	11,559	7,876	18,108	15,120									132	52,795
Edmonton	LND	LND	Lab	Lab	31,221	71.5%	21,115	66.4%	10,106	31,221	858		860	633								43,678
Ellesmere Port and Neston	CHS	NW	Lab	Lab	30,137	59.2%	11,390	74.2%	18,747	30,137	892		821	342								50,939
Elmet and Rothwell	WYK	YTH	Con	Con	32,352	54.3%	9,805	74.2%	32,352	22,547	2,606			995							1,042	59,542
Eltham	LND	LND	Lab	Lab	25,128	54.4%	6,296	71.6%	18,832	25,128	1,457										738	46,155
Enfield North	LND	LND	Lab	Lab	28,177	58.0%	10,247	71.3%	17,930	28,177	1,036		848	574								48,565
Enfield Southgate	LND	LND	Con	Lab	24,989	51.7%	4,355	74.1%	20,634	24,989	1,925			780								48,328
Epping Forest	ESS	E	Con	Con	31,462	62.0%	18,243	67.9%	31,462	13,219	2,884		1,871	1,233							110	50,779
Epsom and Ewell	SRY	SE	Con	Con	35,313	59.6%	20,475	74.1%	35,313	14,838	7,401			1,714								59,266
Erewash	DBY	EM	Con	Con	25,939	52.1%	4,534	68.2%	25,939	21,405	1,243			675							519	49,781
Erith and Thamesmead	LND	LND	Lab	Lab	25,585	57.5%	10,014	63.8%	15,571	25,585	750		1,728	507							323	44,464
Esher and Walton	SRY	SE	Con	Con	35,071	58.6%	23,298	73.9%	35,071	11,773	10,374		1,034	1,074							516	59,842
Exeter	DEV	SW	Lab	Lab	34,336	62.0%	16,117	71.7%	18,219	34,336	1,562			1,027							279	55,423
Falkirk	SCT	SCT	SNP	SNP	20,952	38.9%	4,923	65.4%	14,088	16,029	1,120	20,952	712	908								53,809
Fareham	HAM	SE	Con	Con	35,915	63.0%	21,555	72.3%	35,915	14,360	3,896		1,541	1,302								57,014
Faversham and Mid Kent	KEN	SE	Con	Con	30,390	61.1%	17,413	74.9%	30,390	12,977	3,249		1,702	1,431								49,749
Feltham and Heston	LND	LND	Lab	Lab	32,462	61.2%	15,603	64.9%	16,859	32,462	1,387		1,510	809								53,027
Fermanagh and South Tyrone	NIR	NIR	UUP	SF	25,230	47.2%	875	75.8%						423		25,230		2,587	24,355	886		53,481
Filton and Bradley Stoke	AVN	SW	Con	Con	25,339	50.0%	4,190	70.0%	25,339	21,149	3,052			1,162								50,702
Finchley and Golders Green	LND	LND	Con	Con	24,599	47.0%	1,657	71.4%	24,599	22,942	3,463		462	919								52,385
Folkestone and Hythe	KEN	SE	Con	Con	32,197	54.7%	15,411	68.2%	32,197	16,786	4,222		2,565	2,498							607	58,875
Forest of Dean	GLS	SW	Con	Con	28,096	54.3%	9,502	73.0%	28,096	18,594	2,029		1,237	1,241							570	51,767
Foyle	NIR	NIR	SDLP	SF	18,256	39.7%	169	65.4%							7,398	18,256		18,087		847	1,377	45,965
Fylde	LAN	NW	Con	Con	27,334	58.8%	11,805	70.5%	27,334	15,529	2,341			1,263								46,467
Gainsborough	LIN	EM	Con	Con	31,790	61.8%	17,023	67.8%	31,790	14,767	3,630			1,238								51,425
Garston and Halewood	MSY	NW	Lab	Lab	41,599	77.7%	32,149	71.1%	9,450	41,599	1,723			750								53,522
Gateshead	TWR	NE	Lab	Lab	27,426	65.1%	17,350	64.6%	10,076	27,426	1,709		2,281	611								42,103
Gedling	NTT	EM	Lab	Lab	26,833	51.9%	4,694	72.6%	22,139	26,833	1,052		1,143	515								51,682
Gillingham and Rainham	KEN	SE	Con	Con	27,091	55.4%	9,430	67.0%	27,091	17,661	1,372		2,097	520							127	48,868
Glasgow Central	SCT	SCT	SNP	SNP	16,096	44.7%	2,267	55.9%	5,014	13,829	1,045	16,096										35,984
Glasgow East	SCT	SCT	SNP	SNP	14,024	38.8%	75	54.6%	6,816	13,949	567	14,024	504								306	36,166
Glasgow North	SCT	SCT	SNP	SNP	12,597	37.6%	1,060	62.1%	4,935	11,537	1,153	12,597		3,251								33,473
Glasgow North East	SCT	SCT	SNP	Lab	13,637	42.9%	242	53.0%	4,106	13,637	637	13,395										31,775
Glasgow North West	SCT	SCT	SNP	SNP	16,508	42.5%	2,561	60.9%	7,002	13,947	1,387	16,508										38,844
Glasgow South	SCT	SCT	SNP	SNP	18,312	41.1%	2,027	64.4%	8,506	16,285	1,447	18,312										44,550
Glasgow South West	SCT	SCT	SNP	SNP	14,386	40.7%	60	56.2%	5,524	14,326	661	14,386	481									35,378
Glenrothes	SCT	SCT	SNP	SNP	17,291	42.8%	3,267	60.9%	7,876	14,024	1,208	17,291										40,399
Gloucester	GLS	SW	Con	Con	27,208	50.3%	5,520	65.2%	27,208	21,688	2,716		1,495	754							210	54,071
Gordon	SCT	SCT	SNP	Con	21,861	40.7%	2,607	68.4%	21,861	6,340	6,230	19,254										53,685
Gosport	HAM	SE	Con	Con	30,647	61.9%	17,211	66.7%	30,647	13,436	2,328		1,790	1,024							256	49,481
Gower	WGM	WLS	Con	Lab	22,727	49.9%	3,269	73.3%	19,458	22,727	931		642				1,669				149	45,576
Grantham and Stamford	LIN	EM	Con	Con	35,090	62.0%	20,094	69.2%	35,090	14,996	3,120		1,745	782							860	56,593
Gravesham	KEN	SE	Con	Con	27,237	55.6%	9,347	67.2%	27,237	17,890	1,210		1,742	723							195	48,997
Great Grimsby	HUM	YTH	Lab	Lab	17,545	49.4%	2,565	57.5%	14,980	17,545	954		1,648								394	35,521
Great Yarmouth	NFK	E	Con	Con	23,901	54.1%	7,973	61.8%	23,901	15,928	987		2,767	563								44,146
Greenwich and Woolwich	LND	LND	Lab	Lab	34,215	64.4%	20,714	68.8%	13,501	34,215	3,785			1,605								53,106
Guildford	SRY	SE	Con	Con	30,295	54.6%	17,040	73.7%	30,295	10,545	13,255			1,152							262	55,509
Hackney North and Stoke Newington	LND	LND	Lab	Lab	42,265	75.1%	35,139	66.2%	7,126	42,265	3,817			2,606							484	56,298
Hackney South and Shoreditch	LND	LND	Lab	Lab	43,974	79.4%	37,931	66.6%	6,043	43,974	3,168			1,522							647	55,354
Halesowen and Rowley Regis	WMD	WM	Con	Con	23,012	51.9%	5,253	64.5%	23,012	17,759	859		2,126	440							183	44,379
Halifax	WYK	YTH	Lab	Lab	25,507	52.8%	5,376	67.8%	20,131	25,507	1,070		1,568									48,276
Haltemprice and Howden	HUM	YTH	Con	Con	31,355	61.0%	15,405	71.9%	31,355	15,950	2,482			711							942	51,440
Halton	CHS	NW	Lab	Lab	36,115	72.9%	25,405	67.4%	10,710	36,115	896		1,488								309	49,518
Hammersmith	LND	LND	Lab	Lab	33,375	63.9%	18,651	71.8%	14,724	33,375	2,802		507	800							44	52,252
Hampstead and Kilburn	LND	LND	Lab	Lab	34,464	59.0%	15,560	70.4%	18,904	34,464	4,100			742							197	58,407
Harborough	LEI	EM	Con	Con	30,135	52.3%	12,429	73.1%	30,135	17,706	7,286		1,361	1,110								57,598
Harlow	ESS	E	Con	Con	24,230	54.0%	7,031	66.2%	24,230	17,199	970		1,787	660								44,846
Harrogate and Knaresborough	NYK	YTH	Con	Con	31,477	55.5%	18,168	73.4%	31,477	11,395	13,309										559	56,740
Harrow East	LND	LND	Con	Con	25,129	49.4%	1,757	70.9%	25,129	23,372	1,573			771								50,845
Harrow West	LND	LND	Lab	Lab	30,640	60.8%	13,314	72.1%	17,326	30,640	1,267		470	652								50,355
Hartlepool	CLV	NE	Lab	Lab	21,969	52.5%	7,650	59.2%	14,319	21,969	746		4,801									41,835
Harwich and North Essex	ESS	E	Con	Con	29,921	58.5%	14,356	71.7%	29,921	15,565	2,787		1,685	1,042							141	51,141
Hastings and Rye	SXE	SE	Con	Con	25,668	46.9%	346	69.9%	25,668	25,322	1,885		1,479								412	54,766
Havant	HAM	SE	Con	Con	27,676	59.8%	15,956	63.9%	27,676	11,720	2,801		2,011	1,122							984	46,314
Hayes and Harlington	LND	LND	Lab	Lab	31,796	66.5%	18,115	65.2%	13,681	31,796	601		1,153	571								47,802
Hazel Grove	GTM	NW	Con	Con	20,047	45.4%	5,514	69.9%	20,047	9,036	14,533			516								44,132
Hemel Hempstead	HRT	E	Con	Con	28,735	55.0%	9,445	70.3%	28,735	19,290	3,233			1,024								52,282
Hemsworth	WYK	YTH	Lab	Lab	25,740	56.0%	10,174	63.9%	15,566	25,740	912		2,591								1,135	45,944
Hendon	LND	LND	Con	Con	25,078	48.0%	1,072	68.2%	25,078	24,006	1,985		568	578								52,215
Henley	OXF	SE	Con	Con	33,749	59.1%	22,294	76.1%	33,749	11,455	8,485		1,154	1,864							392	57,099
Hereford and South Herefordshire	HWR	WM	Con	Con	27,004	53.5%	15,013	71.0%	27,004	11,991	3,556		1,153	1,220							5,560	50,484
Hertford and Stortford	HRT	E	Con	Con	36,184	60.3%	19,035	72.9%	36,184	17,149	4,845			1,814								59,992
Hertsmere	HRT	E	Con	Con	31,928	61.1%	16,951	71.0%	31,928	14,977	2,794		1,564	990								52,253
Hexham	NBL	NE	Con	Con	24,996	54.1%	9,236	75.7%	24,996	15,760	3,285		930	1,253								46,224
Heywood and Middleton	GTM	NW	Lab	Lab	26,578	53.3%	7,617	62.4%	18,961	26,578	1,087		3,239									49,865
High Peak	DBY	EM	Con	Lab	26,753	49.7%	2,322	73.5%	24,431	26,753	2,669											53,853
Hitchin and Harpenden	HRT	E	Con	Con	31,189	53.1%	12,031	77.4%	31,189	19,158	6,236			1,329							871	58,783
Holborn and St Pancras	LND	LND	Lab	Lab	41,343	70.1%	30,509	67.0%	10,834	41,343	4,020		727	1,980							93	58,997
Hornchurch and Upminster	LND	LND	Con	Con	33,750	60.2%	17,723	69.4%	33,750	16,027	1,371		3,502	1,077							318	56,045
Hornsey and Wood Green	LND	LND	Lab	Lab	40,738	65.4%	30,738	77.9%	9,246	40,738	10,000		429	1,181							699	62,293
Horsham	WSX	SE	Con	Con	36,906	59.5%	23,484	74.9%	36,906	13,422	7,644		1,533	1,844							638	61,987
Houghton and Sunderland South	TWR	NE	Lab	Lab	24,665	59.5%	12,341	60.9%	12,324	24,665	908		2,379	725							479	41,480
Hove	SXE	SE	Lab	Lab	36,942	64.1%	18,757	77.6%	18,185	36,942	1,311			971							187	57,596
Huddersfield	WYK	YTH	Lab	Lab	26,470	60.4%	12,005	65.4%	14,465	26,470	1,155			1,395							349	43,834
Huntingdon	CAM	E	Con	Con	32,915	55.1%	14,475	70.9%	32,915	18,440	5,090		2,180	1,095								59,720
Hyndburn	LAN	NW	Lab	Lab	24,120	53.4%	5,815	61.8%	18,305	24,120	824		1,953									45,202
Ilford North	LND	LND	Lab	Lab	30,589	57.8%	9,639	74.8%	20,950	30,589	1,034										368	52,941
Ilford South	LND	LND	Lab	Lab	43,724	75.8%	31,647	69.9%	12,077	43,724	772		477	542							65	57,657
Inverclyde	SCT	SCT	SNP	SNP	15,050	38.5%	384	66.4%	8,399	14,666	978	15,050										39,093
Inverness, Nairn, Badenoch and Strathspey	SCT	SCT	SNP	SNP	21,042	39.9%	4,924	68.7%	16,118	8,552	6,477	21,042									612	52,801
Ipswich	SFK	E	Con	Lab	24,224	47.4%	831	67.6%	23,393	24,224	1,187		1,372	840							121	51,137
Isle of Wight	IOW	SE	Con	Con	38,190	51.3%	21,069	67.3%	38,190	17,121	2,740		1,921	12,915							1,592	74,479
Islington North	LND	LND	Lab	Lab	40,086	73.0%	33,215	73.4%	6,871	40,086	4,946		413	2,229							383	54,928
Islington South and Finsbury	LND	LND	Lab	Lab	30,188	62.8%	20,263	69.1%	9,925	30,188	5,809		929	1,198								48,049
Islwyn	GNT	WLS	Lab	Lab	21,238	58.8%	11,412	64.2%	9,826	21,238	685		1,605				2,739					36,093
Jarrow	TWR	NE	Lab	Lab	28,020	65.1%	17,263	66.4%	10,757	28,020	1,163		2,338	745								43,023
Keighley	WYK	YTH	Con	Lab	24,056	46.5%	239	72.4%	23,817	24,056	1,226		1,291	790							534	51,714
Kenilworth and Southam	WAR	WM	Con	Con	31,207	60.8%	18,076	77.4%	31,207	13,131	4,921		929	1,133								51,321
Kensington	LND	LND	Con	Lab	16,333	42.2%	20	63.8%	16,313	16,333	4,724			767							540	38,677
Kettering	NTH	EM	Con	Con	28,616	57.9%	10,562	69.2%	28,616	18,054	1,618			1,116								49,404
Kilmarnock and Loudoun	SCT	SCT	SNP	SNP	19,690	42.3%	6,269	63.4%	12,404	13,421	994	19,690										46,509
Kingston and Surbiton	LND	LND	Con	LD	27,810	44.7%	4,124	76.2%	23,686	9,203	27,810		675	536							268	62,178
Kingston upon Hull East	HUM	YTH	Lab	Lab	21,355	58.3%	10,396	55.5%	10,959	21,355	1,258		2,573	493								36,638
Kingston upon Hull North	HUM	YTH	Lab	Lab	23,685	63.8%	14,322	57.4%	9,363	23,685	1,869		1,601	604								37,122
Kingston upon Hull West and Hessle	HUM	YTH	Lab	Lab	18,342	53.1%	8,025	57.4%	10,317	18,342	2,210		1,399	332							1,965	34,565
Kingswood	AVN	SW	Con	Con	26,754	54.9%	7,500	70.3%	26,754	19,254	1,749			984								48,741
Kirkcaldy and Cowdenbeath	SCT	SCT	SNP	Lab	17,016	36.8%	259	63.5%	10,762	17,016	1,118	16,757	540									46,193
Knowsley	MSY	NW	Lab	Lab	47,351	85.3%	42,214	67.9%	5,137	47,351	1,189		1,285	521								55,483
Lagan Valley	NIR	NIR	DUP	DUP	26,762	59.6%	19,229	62.1%	462						26,762	1,567		3,384	7,533	4,996	222	44,926
Lanark and Hamilton East	SCT	SCT	SNP	SNP	16,444	32.6%	266	65.3%	16,178	16,084	1,214	16,444	550									50,470
Lancaster and Fleetwood	LAN	NW	Lab	Lab	25,342	55.1%	6,661	68.5%	18,681	25,342	1,170			796								45,989
Leeds Central	WYK	YTH	Lab	Lab	33,453	70.2%	23,698	53.2%	9,755	33,453	1,063		2,056	1,189							157	47,673
Leeds East	WYK	YTH	Lab	Lab	25,428	61.4%	12,752	62.8%	12,676	25,428	739		1,742	434							422	41,441
Leeds North East	WYK	YTH	Lab	Lab	33,436	63.1%	16,991	75.6%	16,445	33,436	1,952			680							486	52,999
Leeds North West	WYK	YTH	LD	Lab	20,416	44.1%	4,224	67.9%	9,097	20,416	16,192			582								46,287
Leeds West	WYK	YTH	Lab	Lab	27,013	64.0%	15,965	62.1%	11,048	27,013	905		1,815	1,023							425	42,229
Leicester East	LEI	EM	Lab	Lab	35,116	67.0%	22,428	67.4%	12,688	35,116	1,343			1,070							2,207	52,424
Leicester South	LEI	EM	Lab	Lab	37,157	73.6%	26,261	66.9%	10,896	37,157	1,287			1,177								50,517
Leicester West	LEI	EM	Lab	Lab	22,823	60.8%	11,060	57.9%	11,763	22,823	792		1,406	607							121	37,512
Leigh	GTM	NW	Lab	Lab	26,347	56.2%	9,554	61.5%	16,793	26,347	951		2,783									46,874
Lewes	SXE	SE	Con	Con	26,820	49.5%	5,508	76.4%	26,820	6,060	21,312											54,192
Lewisham Deptford	LND	LND	Lab	Lab	42,461	77.0%	34,899	70.2%	7,562	42,461	2,911			1,640							538	55,112
Lewisham East	LND	LND	Lab	Lab	32,072	67.9%	21,213	69.3%	10,859	32,072	2,086		798	803							583	47,201
Lewisham West and Penge	LND	LND	Lab	Lab	35,411	66.6%	23,162	73.0%	12,249	35,411	3,317		700	1,144							375	53,196
Leyton and Wanstead	LND	LND	Lab	Lab	32,234	69.8%	22,607	70.9%	9,627	32,234	2,961			1,351								46,173
Lichfield	STS	WM	Con	Con	34,018	63.6%	18,581	71.9%	34,018	15,437	2,653			1,416								53,524
Lincoln	LIN	EM	Con	Lab	23,333	47.9%	1,538	66.6%	21,795	23,333	1,284		1,287	583							436	48,718
Linlithgow and East Falkirk	SCT	SCT	SNP	SNP	20,388	36.3%	2,919	65.1%	16,311	17,469	1,926	20,388										56,094
Liverpool Riverside	MSY	NW	Lab	Lab	40,599	84.5%	35,947	62.9%	4,652	40,599	1,187			1,582								48,020
Liverpool Walton	MSY	NW	Lab	Lab	36,175	85.7%	32,551	67.3%	3,624	36,175	638			523							1,237	42,197
Liverpool Wavertree	MSY	NW	Lab	Lab	34,717	79.6%	29,466	69.9%	5,251	34,717	2,858			598							216	43,640
Liverpool West Derby	MSY	NW	Lab	Lab	37,371	82.7%	32,908	69.3%	4,463	37,371	545			329							2,455	45,163
Livingston	SCT	SCT	SNP	SNP	21,036	40.1%	3,878	64.7%	12,799	17,158	1,512	21,036										52,505
Llanelli	DFD	WLS	Lab	Lab	21,568	53.5%	12,024	67.9%	9,544	21,568	548		1,331				7,351					40,342
Loughborough	LEI	EM	Con	Con	27,022	49.9%	4,269	68.0%	27,022	22,753	1,937		1,465	971								54,148
Louth and Horncastle	LIN	EM	Con	Con	33,733	63.9%	19,641	66.8%	33,733	14,092	1,990		2,460								496	52,771
Ludlow	SAL	WM	Con	Con	31,433	62.9%	19,286	73.4%	31,433	12,147	5,336			1,054								49,970
Luton North	BDF	E	Lab	Lab	29,765	63.8%	14,364	69.8%	15,401	29,765	808			648								46,622
Luton South	BDF	E	Lab	Lab	28,804	62.4%	13,925	68.7%	14,879	28,804	1,056		795	439							160	46,133
Macclesfield	CHS	NW	Con	Con	28,595	52.7%	8,608	72.2%	28,595	19,987	3,350			1,213							1,162	54,307
Maidenhead	BRK	SE	Con	Con	37,718	64.8%	26,457	76.6%	37,718	11,261	6,540		871	907							942	58,239
Maidstone and The Weald	KEN	SE	Con	Con	29,156	56.4%	17,723	68.7%	29,156	11,433	8,455		1,613	888							172	51,717
Makerfield	GTM	NW	Lab	Lab	28,245	60.2%	13,542	63.2%	14,703	28,245	1,322										2,663	46,933
Maldon	ESS	E	Con	Con	34,111	67.9%	23,430	70.2%	34,111	10,681	2,181		1,899	1,073							257	50,202
Manchester Central	GTM	NW	Lab	Lab	38,490	77.4%	31,445	55.1%	7,045	38,490	1,678		1,469	846							192	49,720
Manchester Gorton	GTM	NW	Lab	Lab	35,085	76.3%	31,730	61.0%	3,355	35,085	2,597		952	1,038							2,926	45,953
Manchester Withington	GTM	NW	Lab	Lab	38,424	71.7%	29,875	71.8%	5,530	38,424	8,549			865							234	53,602
Mansfield	NTT	EM	Lab	Con	23,392	46.6%	1,057	64.5%	23,392	22,335	697		2,654								1,079	50,157
Meon Valley	HAM	SE	Con	Con	35,624	65.7%	25,692	73.0%	35,624	9,932	5,900		1,435	1,301								54,192
Meriden	WMD	WM	Con	Con	33,873	62.0%	19,198	67.1%	33,873	14,675	2,663		2,016	1,416								54,643
Merthyr Tydfil and Rhymney	GNT	WLS	Lab	Lab	22,407	66.8%	16,334	60.5%	6,073	22,407	841		1,484				2,740					33,545
Mid Bedfordshire	BDF	E	Con	Con	38,936	61.7%	20,983	75.0%	38,936	17,953	3,788			1,794							667	63,138
Mid Derbyshire	DBY	EM	Con	Con	29,513	58.6%	11,616	74.7%	29,513	17,897	1,793			1,168								50,371
Mid Dorset and North Poole	DOR	SW	Con	Con	28,585	59.2%	15,339	74.2%	28,585	6,423	13,246											48,254
Mid Norfolk	NFK	E	Con	Con	32,828	59.0%	16,086	69.6%	32,828	16,742	2,848		2,092	1,158								55,668
Mid Sussex	WSX	SE	Con	Con	35,082	56.9%	19,673	73.2%	35,082	15,409	7,855		1,251	1,571							464	61,632
Mid Ulster	NIR	NIR	SF	SF	25,455	54.5%	12,890	68.2%							12,565	25,455		4,563	3,017	1,094		46,694
Mid Worcestershire	HWR	WM	Con	Con	35,967	65.3%	23,326	72.4%	35,967	12,641	3,450		1,660	1,371								55,089
Middlesbrough	CLV	NE	Lab	Lab	23,404	65.7%	13,873	58.4%	9,531	23,404	368		1,452	250							632	35,637
Middlesbrough South and East Cleveland	CLV	NE	Lab	Con	23,643	49.6%	1,020	65.8%	23,643	22,623	1,354											47,620
Midlothian	SCT	SCT	SNP	Lab	16,458	36.4%	885	66.3%	11,521	16,458	1,721	15,573										45,273
Milton Keynes North	BKM	SE	Con	Con	30,367	47.5%	1,975	71.7%	30,367	28,392	2,499		1,390	1,107							169	63,924
Milton Keynes South	BKM	SE	Con	Con	30,652	47.5%	1,665	69.8%	30,652	28,987	1,895		1,833	1,179								64,546
Mitcham and Morden	LND	LND	Lab	Lab	33,039	68.7%	21,375	70.0%	11,664	33,039	1,494		1,054	644							223	48,118
Mole Valley	SRY	SE	Con	Con	35,092	61.9%	24,137	76.1%	35,092	7,864	10,955		1,352	1,463								56,726
Monmouth	GNT	WLS	Con	Con	26,411	53.1%	8,206	76.6%	26,411	18,205	2,064		762	954			1,338					49,734
Montgomeryshire	POW	WLS	Con	Con	18,075	51.8%	9,285	68.7%	18,075	5,542	8,790			524			1,960					34,891
Moray	SCT	SCT	SNP	Con	22,637	47.6%	4,159	67.4%	22,637	5,208	1,078	18,478									204	47,605
Morecambe and Lunesdale	LAN	NW	Con	Con	21,773	47.7%	1,399	68.3%	21,773	20,374	1,699		1,333	478								45,657
Morley and Outwood	WYK	YTH	Con	Con	26,550	50.7%	2,104	68.4%	26,550	24,446	1,361											52,357
Motherwell and Wishaw	SCT	SCT	SNP	SNP	16,150	38.5%	318	61.5%	8,490	15,832	920	16,150	534									41,926
Na h-Eileanan an Iar	SCT	SCT	SNP	SNP	6,013	40.6%	1,007	69.6%	2,441	5,006	250	6,013									1,108	14,818
Neath	WGM	WLS	Lab	Lab	21,713	56.7%	12,631	68.5%	9,082	21,713	732		1,419				5,339					38,285
New Forest East	HAM	SE	Con	Con	32,162	62.6%	21,995	70.8%	32,162	10,167	7,786			1,251								51,366
New Forest West	HAM	SE	Con	Con	33,170	66.8%	23,431	72.1%	33,170	9,739	4,781			1,454							483	49,627
Newark	NTT	EM	Con	Con	34,493	62.7%	18,149	72.9%	34,493	16,344	2,786		1,419									55,042
Newbury	BRK	SE	Con	Con	37,399	61.5%	24,380	73.4%	37,399	8,596	13,019			1,531							304	60,849
Newcastle upon Tyne Central	TWR	NE	Lab	Lab	24,071	64.9%	14,937	67.0%	9,134	24,071	1,812		1,482	595								37,094
Newcastle upon Tyne East	TWR	NE	Lab	Lab	28,127	67.6%	19,261	67.2%	8,866	28,127	2,574		1,315	755								41,637
Newcastle upon Tyne North	TWR	NE	Lab	Lab	26,729	55.4%	10,349	73.1%	16,380	26,729	2,533		1,780	513							353	48,288
Newcastle-under-Lyme	STS	WM	Lab	Lab	21,124	48.2%	30	66.8%	21,094	21,124	1,624											43,842
Newport East	GNT	WLS	Lab	Lab	20,804	56.5%	8,003	64.3%	12,801	20,804	966		1,180				881				188	36,820
Newport West	GNT	WLS	Lab	Lab	22,723	52.3%	5,658	67.5%	17,065	22,723	976		1,100	497			1,077					43,438
Newry and Armagh	NIR	NIR	SF	SF	25,666	47.9%	12,489	68.5%							13,177	25,666		9,055	4,425	1,256		53,579
Newton Abbot	DEV	SW	Con	Con	28,635	55.5%	17,160	72.0%	28,635	11,475	10,601			926								51,637
Normanton, Pontefract and Castleford	WYK	YTH	Lab	Lab	29,268	59.5%	14,499	60.3%	14,769	29,268	693		3,030								1,431	49,191
North Antrim	NIR	NIR	DUP	DUP	28,521	58.9%	20,643	64.1%							28,521	7,878		2,574	3,482	2,723	3,282	48,460
North Ayrshire and Arran	SCT	SCT	SNP	SNP	18,451	38.9%	3,633	64.8%	14,818	13,040	1,124	18,451										47,433
North Cornwall	CUL	SW	Con	Con	25,835	50.7%	7,200	74.0%	25,835	6,151	18,635										323	50,944
North Devon	DEV	SW	Con	Con	25,517	45.8%	4,332	73.5%	25,517	7,063	21,185		1,187	753								55,705
North Dorset	DOR	SW	Con	Con	36,169	64.9%	25,777	73.0%	36,169	10,392	7,556			1,607								55,724
North Down	NIR	NIR	Ind	Ind	16,148	41.2%	1,208	60.9%	941					2,549	14,940	531		400		3,639	16,185	39,185
North Durham	DUR	NE	Lab	Lab	25,917	59.9%	12,939	64.6%	12,978	25,917	1,981		2,408									43,284
North East Bedfordshire	BDF	E	Con	Con	39,139	60.9%	20,862	73.4%	39,139	18,277	3,693		1,896	1,215								64,220
North East Cambridgeshire	CAM	E	Con	Con	34,340	64.4%	21,270	63.1%	34,340	13,070	2,383		2,174	1,024							293	53,284
North East Derbyshire	DBY	EM	Lab	Con	24,783	49.2%	2,860	69.9%	24,783	21,923	1,390		1,565	719								50,380
North East Fife	SCT	SCT	SNP	SNP	13,743	32.9%	2	71.3%	10,088	4,026	13,741	13,743									224	41,822
North East Hampshire	HAM	SE	Con	Con	37,754	65.5%	27,772	77.3%	37,754	9,982	6,987		1,061	1,476							367	57,627
North East Hertfordshire	HRT	E	Con	Con	32,587	58.6%	16,835	73.2%	32,587	15,752	4,276			2,965								55,580
North East Somerset	AVN	SW	Con	Con	28,992	53.6%	10,235	75.7%	28,992	18,757	4,461			1,245							588	54,043
North Herefordshire	HWR	WM	Con	Con	31,097	62.0%	21,602	74.1%	31,097	9,495	5,874			2,771							940	50,177
North Norfolk	NFK	E	LD	LD	25,260	48.4%	3,512	75.3%	21,748	5,180	25,260											52,188
North Shropshire	SAL	WM	Con	Con	33,642	60.5%	16,355	69.0%	33,642	17,287	2,948			1,722								55,599
North Somerset	AVN	SW	Con	Con	33,605	54.2%	17,103	77.0%	33,605	16,502	5,982			1,976							3,929	61,994
North Swindon	WIL	SW	Con	Con	29,431	53.6%	8,335	68.5%	29,431	21,096	1,962		1,564	858								54,911
North Thanet	KEN	SE	Con	Con	27,163	56.2%	10,738	66.5%	27,163	16,425	1,586		2,198	825							128	48,325
North Tyneside	TWR	NE	Lab	Lab	33,456	64.5%	19,284	65.8%	14,172	33,456	1,494		2,101	669								51,892
North Warwickshire	WAR	WM	Con	Con	26,860	56.9%	8,510	65.3%	26,860	18,350	1,028			940								47,178
North West Cambridgeshire	CAM	E	Con	Con	37,529	58.6%	18,008	68.6%	37,529	19,521	3,168		2,518	1,255								63,991
North West Durham	DUR	NE	Lab	Lab	25,308	52.8%	8,792	66.6%	16,516	25,308	3,398		2,150	530								47,902
North West Hampshire	HAM	SE	Con	Con	36,471	62.1%	22,679	72.2%	36,471	13,792	5,708		1,467	1,334								58,772
North West Leicestershire	LEI	EM	Con	Con	31,153	58.2%	13,286	71.0%	31,153	17,867	3,420			1,101								53,541
North West Norfolk	NFK	E	Con	Con	29,408	60.2%	13,788	67.7%	29,408	15,620	1,393		1,539	851								48,811
North Wiltshire	WIL	SW	Con	Con	32,398	60.3%	22,877	75.2%	32,398	9,399	9,521		871	1,141							376	53,706
Northampton North	NTH	EM	Con	Con	19,065	47.2%	807	68.6%	19,065	18,258	1,015		1,404	636								40,378
Northampton South	NTH	EM	Con	Con	19,231	46.9%	1,159	66.4%	19,231	18,072	1,405		1,630	696								41,034
Norwich North	NFK	E	Con	Con	21,900	47.7%	507	68.6%	21,900	21,393	1,480			782							340	45,895
Norwich South	NFK	E	Lab	Lab	31,311	61.0%	15,596	69.2%	15,715	31,311	2,841			1,492								51,359
Nottingham East	NTT	EM	Lab	Lab	28,102	71.5%	19,590	63.7%	8,512	28,102	1,003		817	698							195	39,327
Nottingham North	NTT	EM	Lab	Lab	23,067	60.2%	11,160	57.3%	11,907	23,067	674		2,133	538								38,319
Nottingham South	NTT	EM	Lab	Lab	30,013	62.4%	15,162	67.6%	14,851	30,013	1,564		1,103	598								48,129
Nuneaton	WAR	WM	Con	Con	23,755	51.6%	4,739	66.6%	23,755	19,016	914		1,619	763								46,067
Ochil and South Perthshire	SCT	SCT	SNP	Con	22,469	41.5%	3,359	70.6%	22,469	10,847	1,742	19,110										54,168
Ogmore	MGM	WLS	Lab	Lab	23,225	62.4%	13,871	65.1%	9,354	23,225	594		1,235				2,796					37,204
Old Bexley and Sidcup	LND	LND	Con	Con	29,545	61.5%	15,466	72.8%	29,545	14,079	1,572		1,619	820							407	48,042
Oldham East and Saddleworth	GTM	NW	Lab	Lab	25,629	54.5%	8,182	65.2%	17,447	25,629	1,683		2,278									47,037
Oldham West and Royton	GTM	NW	Lab	Lab	29,846	65.2%	17,198	63.2%	12,648	29,846	956		1,899	439								45,788
Orkney and Shetland	SCT	SCT	LD	LD	11,312	48.6%	4,563	68.1%	2,024	2,664	11,312	6,749	283								245	23,277
Orpington	LND	LND	Con	Con	31,762	62.9%	19,461	74.3%	31,762	12,301	3,315		2,023	1,060								50,461
Oxford East	OXF	SE	Lab	Lab	35,118	65.2%	23,284	68.8%	11,834	35,118	4,904			1,785							255	53,896
Oxford West and Abingdon	OXF	SE	Con	LD	26,256	43.7%	816	79.4%	25,440	7,573	26,256		751									60,020
Paisley and Renfrewshire North	SCT	SCT	SNP	SNP	17,455	37.4%	2,613	69.1%	12,842	14,842	1,476	17,455										46,615
Paisley and Renfrewshire South	SCT	SCT	SNP	SNP	16,964	40.7%	2,541	68.0%	8,122	14,423	1,327	16,964									876	41,712
Pendle	LAN	NW	Con	Con	21,986	49.0%	1,279	69.0%	21,986	20,707	941			502							718	44,854
Penistone and Stocksbridge	SYK	YTH	Lab	Lab	22,807	45.8%	1,322	69.8%	21,485	22,807	2,042		3,453									49,787
Penrith and The Border	CMA	NW	Con	Con	28,078	60.4%	15,910	71.3%	28,078	12,168	3,641		1,142	1,029							412	46,470
Perth and North Perthshire	SCT	SCT	SNP	SNP	21,804	42.3%	21	71.8%	21,783	5,349	2,589	21,804										51,525
Peterborough	CAM	E	Con	Lab	22,950	48.1%	607	66.7%	22,343	22,950	1,597			848								47,738
Plymouth Moor View	DEV	SW	Con	Con	23,567	51.9%	5,019	65.5%	23,567	18,548	917		1,849	536								45,417
Plymouth Sutton and Devonport	DEV	SW	Con	Lab	27,283	53.3%	6,807	66.9%	20,476	27,283	1,244		1,364	604							237	51,208
Pontypridd	MGM	WLS	Lab	Lab	22,103	55.4%	11,448	65.9%	10,655	22,103	1,963		1,071				4,102					39,894
Poole	DOR	SW	Con	Con	28,888	57.9%	14,209	67.6%	28,888	14,679	4,433			1,299							551	49,850
Poplar and Limehouse	LND	LND	Lab	Lab	39,558	67.3%	27,712	67.3%	11,846	39,558	3,959		849	989							1,613	58,814
Portsmouth North	HAM	SE	Con	Con	25,860	54.8%	9,965	66.1%	25,860	15,895	2,608		1,926	791							130	47,210
Portsmouth South	HAM	SE	Con	Lab	18,290	41.0%	1,554	63.9%	16,736	18,290	7,699		1,129	712								44,566
Preseli Pembrokeshire	DFD	WLS	Con	Con	18,302	43.4%	314	72.1%	18,302	17,988	1,106		850				2,711				1,240	42,197
Preston	LAN	NW	Lab	Lab	24,210	68.0%	15,723	61.6%	8,487	24,210	1,204		1,348	348								35,597
Pudsey	WYK	YTH	Con	Con	25,550	47.4%	331	74.3%	25,550	25,219	1,761										1,429	53,959
Putney	LND	LND	Con	Con	20,679	44.1%	1,554	72.1%	20,679	19,125	5,448		477	1,107							58	46,894
Rayleigh and Wickford	ESS	E	Con	Con	36,914	66.7%	23,450	70.4%	36,914	13,464	1,557		2,326	1,062								55,323
Reading East	BRK	SE	Con	Lab	27,093	49.0%	3,749	73.1%	23,344	27,093	3,378			1,093							330	55,238
Reading West	BRK	SE	Con	Con	25,311	48.9%	2,876	69.5%	25,311	22,435	3,041			979								51,766
Redcar	CLV	NE	Lab	Lab	23,623	55.5%	9,485	63.7%	14,138	23,623	2,849		1,950									42,560
Redditch	HWR	WM	Con	Con	23,652	52.3%	7,363	70.2%	23,652	16,289	1,173		1,371	380							2,338	45,203
Reigate	SRY	SE	Con	Con	30,896	57.4%	17,614	72.1%	30,896	13,282	5,889		1,542	2,214								53,823
Rhondda	MGM	WLS	Lab	Lab	21,096	64.1%	13,746	65.2%	3,333	21,096	277		880				7,350					32,936
Ribble Valley	LAN	NW	Con	Con	31,919	57.8%	13,199	70.8%	31,919	18,720	3,247			1,314								55,200
Richmond (Yorks)	NYK	YTH	Con	Con	36,458	63.9%	23,108	70.5%	36,458	13,350	3,360			1,739							2,106	57,013
Richmond Park	LND	LND	Con	Con	28,588	45.1%	45	79.1%	28,588	5,773	28,543		426									63,330
Rochdale	GTM	NW	Lab	Lab	29,035	58.0%	14,819	64.1%	14,216	29,035	4,027		1,641								1,125	50,044
Rochester and Strood	KEN	SE	Con	Con	29,232	54.4%	9,850	65.0%	29,232	19,382	1,189		2,893	781							292	53,769
Rochford and Southend East	ESS	E	Con	Con	23,013	48.7%	5,548	64.3%	23,013	17,465	1,265		1,777	804							2,924	47,248
Romford	LND	LND	Con	Con	29,671	59.4%	13,778	68.0%	29,671	15,893	1,215		2,350	815								49,944
Romsey and Southampton North	HAM	SE	Con	Con	28,668	57.2%	18,046	74.6%	28,668	9,614	10,622			953							271	50,128
Ross, Skye and Lochaber	SCT	SCT	SNP	SNP	15,480	40.3%	5,919	71.7%	9,561	4,695	8,042	15,480									676	38,454
Rossendale and Darwen	LAN	NW	Con	Con	25,499	50.8%	3,216	69.2%	25,499	22,283	1,550			824								50,156
Rother Valley	SYK	YTH	Lab	Lab	23,821	48.1%	3,882	65.8%	19,939	23,821	1,155		3,704	869								49,488
Rotherham	SYK	YTH	Lab	Lab	21,404	56.4%	11,387	60.0%	10,017	21,404	1,754		3,316								1,432	37,923
Rugby	WAR	WM	Con	Con	27,872	54.3%	8,212	71.1%	27,872	19,660	2,851			953								51,336
Ruislip, Northwood and Pinner	LND	LND	Con	Con	30,555	57.2%	13,980	72.7%	30,555	16,575	3,813		1,171	1,268								53,382
Runnymede and Weybridge	SRY	SE	Con	Con	31,436	60.9%	18,050	68.9%	31,436	13,386	3,765		1,675	1,347								51,609
Rushcliffe	NTT	EM	Con	Con	30,223	51.8%	8,010	78.0%	30,223	22,213	2,759		1,490	1,626								58,311
Rutherglen and Hamilton West	SCT	SCT	SNP	Lab	19,101	37.5%	265	63.5%	9,941	19,101	2,158	18,836	465								371	50,872
Rutland and Melton	LEI	EM	Con	Con	36,169	62.8%	23,104	73.4%	36,169	13,065	4,711		1,869	1,755								57,569
Saffron Walden	ESS	E	Con	Con	37,629	61.8%	24,966	73.3%	37,629	12,663	8,528		2,091									60,911
Salford and Eccles	GTM	NW	Lab	Lab	31,168	65.5%	19,132	61.0%	12,036	31,168	1,286		2,320	809								47,619
Salisbury	WIL	SW	Con	Con	30,952	58.1%	17,333	73.1%	30,952	13,619	5,982		1,191	1,152							415	53,311
Scarborough and Whitby	NYK	YTH	Con	Con	24,401	48.4%	3,435	68.5%	24,401	20,966	1,354		1,682	915							1,131	50,449
Scunthorpe	HUM	YTH	Lab	Lab	20,916	52.0%	3,431	65.3%	17,485	20,916	554		1,247									40,202
Sedgefield	DUR	NE	Lab	Lab	22,202	53.4%	6,059	65.1%	16,143	22,202	797		1,763	686								41,591
Sefton Central	MSY	NW	Lab	Lab	32,830	63.0%	15,618	75.5%	17,212	32,830	1,381			656								52,079
Selby and Ainsty	NYK	YTH	Con	Con	32,921	58.7%	13,772	73.9%	32,921	19,149	2,293		1,713									56,076
Sevenoaks	KEN	SE	Con	Con	32,644	63.7%	21,917	71.6%	32,644	10,727	4,280		1,894	1,673								51,218
Sheffield Brightside and Hillsborough	SYK	YTH	Lab	Lab	28,193	67.3%	19,143	59.5%	9,050	28,193	1,061		2,645	737							184	41,870
Sheffield Central	SYK	YTH	Lab	Lab	33,963	70.9%	27,748	61.7%	6,215	33,963	2,465		1,060	3,848							326	47,877
Sheffield Hallam	SYK	YTH	LD	Lab	21,881	38.4%	2,125	77.6%	13,561	21,881	19,756		929	823							70	57,020
Sheffield Heeley	SYK	YTH	Lab	Lab	26,524	60.0%	13,828	65.0%	12,696	26,524	2,022		1,977	943							64	44,226
Sheffield South East	SYK	YTH	Lab	Lab	25,520	58.5%	11,798	63.2%	13,722	25,520	1,432		2,820								102	43,596
Sherwood	NTT	EM	Con	Con	27,492	51.5%	5,198	70.0%	27,492	22,294	1,113		1,801	664								53,364
Shipley	WYK	YTH	Con	Con	27,417	51.3%	4,681	73.0%	27,417	22,736	2,202										1,040	53,395
Shrewsbury and Atcham	SAL	WM	Con	Con	29,073	50.0%	6,627	73.6%	29,073	22,446	4,254		1,363	1,067								58,203
Sittingbourne and Sheppey	KEN	SE	Con	Con	30,911	60.2%	15,211	62.9%	30,911	15,700	1,392			558							2,828	51,389
Skipton and Ripon	NYK	YTH	Con	Con	36,425	62.7%	19,985	74.4%	36,425	16,440				3,734							1,539	58,138
Sleaford and North Hykeham	LIN	EM	Con	Con	42,245	64.2%	25,237	72.4%	42,245	17,008	2,722		1,954	968							900	65,797
Slough	BRK	SE	Lab	Lab	34,170	62.9%	16,998	65.2%	17,172	34,170	1,308		1,228								417	54,295
Solihull	WMD	WM	Con	Con	32,985	58.1%	20,571	73.0%	32,985	12,414	8,901		1,291	1,157								56,748
Somerton and Frome	SOM	SW	Con	Con	36,231	56.7%	22,906	75.7%	36,231	10,998	13,325			2,347							991	63,892
South Antrim	NIR	NIR	UUP	DUP	16,508	38.2%	3,208	63.3%							16,508	7,797		2,362	13,300	3,203		43,170
South Basildon and East Thurrock	ESS	E	Con	Con	26,811	56.9%	11,490	64.1%	26,811	15,321	732		3,193	680							383	47,120
South Cambridgeshire	CAM	E	Con	Con	33,631	51.8%	15,952	76.2%	33,631	17,679	12,102			1,512								64,924
South Derbyshire	DBY	EM	Con	Con	30,907	58.7%	11,970	68.9%	30,907	18,937	1,870			917								52,631
South Dorset	DOR	SW	Con	Con	29,135	56.1%	11,695	71.8%	29,135	17,440	3,053			2,278								51,906
South Down	NIR	NIR	SDLP	SF	20,328	39.9%	2,446	67.2%							8,867	20,328		17,882	2,002	1,814		50,893
South East Cambridgeshire	CAM	E	Con	Con	33,601	53.3%	16,158	73.2%	33,601	17,443	11,958											63,002
South East Cornwall	CUL	SW	Con	Con	29,493	55.4%	17,443	74.0%	29,493	12,050	10,346			1,335								53,224
South Holland and The Deepings	LIN	EM	Con	Con	35,179	69.9%	24,897	65.9%	35,179	10,282	1,433		2,185	894							342	50,315
South Leicestershire	LEI	EM	Con	Con	34,795	61.4%	18,631	71.8%	34,795	16,164	2,403		2,235	1,092								56,689
South Norfolk	NFK	E	Con	Con	35,580	58.2%	16,678	73.6%	35,580	18,902	5,074			1,555								61,111
South Northamptonshire	NTH	EM	Con	Con	40,599	62.5%	22,840	75.8%	40,599	17,759	3,623		1,363	1,357							297	64,998
South Ribble	LAN	NW	Con	Con	28,980	52.9%	7,421	72.4%	28,980	21,559	2,073		1,387	494							341	54,834
South Shields	TWR	NE	Lab	Lab	25,078	61.5%	14,508	64.3%	10,570	25,078	681		3,006	1,437								40,772
South Staffordshire	STS	WM	Con	Con	35,656	69.8%	22,733	69.6%	35,656	12,923	1,348			1,182								51,109
South Suffolk	SFK	E	Con	Con	32,829	60.5%	17,749	71.8%	32,829	15,080	3,154		1,449	1,723								54,235
South Swindon	WIL	SW	Con	Con	24,809	48.4%	2,464	70.8%	24,809	22,345	2,079		1,291	747								51,271
South Thanet	KEN	SE	Con	Con	25,262	50.8%	6,387	68.8%	25,262	18,875	1,514		2,997	809							296	49,753
South West Bedfordshire	BDF	E	Con	Con	32,961	59.2%	14,168	69.8%	32,961	18,793	2,630			950							301	55,635
South West Devon	DEV	SW	Con	Con	31,634	59.8%	15,816	74.2%	31,634	15,818	2,732		1,540	1,133								52,857
South West Hertfordshire	HRT	E	Con	Con	35,128	57.9%	19,550	74.8%	35,128	15,578	7,078		1,293	1,576								60,653
South West Norfolk	NFK	E	Con	Con	32,894	62.8%	18,312	67.3%	32,894	14,582	2,365		2,575									52,416
South West Surrey	SRY	SE	Con	Con	33,683	55.7%	21,590	77.4%	33,683	7,606	5,967		1,083								12,093	60,432
South West Wiltshire	WIL	SW	Con	Con	32,841	60.0%	18,326	71.2%	32,841	14,515	5,360			1,445							590	54,751
Southampton Itchen	HAM	SE	Con	Con	21,773	46.5%	31	65.2%	21,773	21,742	1,421		1,122	725								46,783
Southampton Test	HAM	SE	Lab	Lab	27,509	58.7%	11,503	66.8%	16,006	27,509	1,892										1,496	46,903
Southend West	ESS	E	Con	Con	26,046	55.2%	10,000	69.7%	26,046	16,046	2,110		1,666	831							492	47,191
Southport	MSY	NW	LD	Con	18,541	38.7%	2,914	69.1%	18,541	15,627	12,661		1,127									47,956
Spelthorne	SRY	SE	Con	Con	28,692	57.3%	13,425	69.0%	28,692	15,267	2,755		2,296	1,105								50,115
St Albans	HRT	E	Con	Con	24,571	43.1%	6,109	78.3%	24,571	13,137	18,462			828								56,998
St Austell and Newquay	CUL	SW	Con	Con	26,856	49.5%	11,142	69.0%	26,856	15,714	11,642											54,212
St Helens North	MSY	NW	Lab	Lab	32,012	63.7%	18,406	66.0%	13,606	32,012	1,287		2,097	1,220								50,222
St Helens South and Whiston	MSY	NW	Lab	Lab	35,879	67.8%	24,343	66.9%	11,536	35,879	2,101		1,953	1,417								52,886
St Ives	CUL	SW	Con	Con	22,120	43.2%	312	76.3%	22,120	7,298	21,808											51,226
Stafford	STS	WM	Con	Con	28,424	54.7%	7,729	75.9%	28,424	20,695	1,540			1,265								51,924
Staffordshire Moorlands	STS	WM	Con	Con	25,963	58.1%	10,830	70.6%	25,963	15,133	1,494			541							1,524	44,655
Stalybridge and Hyde	GTM	NW	Lab	Lab	24,277	57.2%	8,084	59.5%	16,193	24,277	996			991								42,457
Stevenage	HRT	E	Con	Con	24,798	50.3%	3,386	69.7%	24,798	21,412	2,032			1,085								49,327
Stirling	SCT	SCT	SNP	Con	18,291	37.1%	148	74.3%	18,291	10,902	1,683	18,143									337	49,356
Stockport	GTM	NW	Lab	Lab	26,282	63.3%	14,477	64.7%	11,805	26,282	1,778		1,088	591								41,544
Stockton North	CLV	NE	Lab	Lab	24,304	56.9%	8,715	64.5%	15,589	24,304	646		1,834	358								42,731
Stockton South	CLV	NE	Con	Lab	26,102	48.5%	888	71.2%	25,214	26,102	951		1,186	371								53,824
Stoke-on-Trent Central	STS	WM	Lab	Lab	17,083	51.5%	3,897	58.2%	13,186	17,083	680		1,608	378							210	33,145
Stoke-on-Trent North	STS	WM	Lab	Lab	21,272	50.9%	2,359	58.4%	18,913	21,272	916			685								41,786
Stoke-on-Trent South	STS	WM	Lab	Con	20,451	49.1%	663	63.1%	20,451	19,788	808			643								41,690
Stone	STS	WM	Con	Con	31,614	63.2%	17,495	73.8%	31,614	14,119	2,222		1,370	707								50,032
Stourbridge	WMD	WM	Con	Con	25,706	54.5%	7,654	67.1%	25,706	18,052	1,083		1,801	493								47,135
Strangford	NIR	NIR	DUP	DUP	24,036	62.0%	18,343	60.2%	507					607	24,036	1,083		2,404	4,419	5,693		38,749
Stratford-on-Avon	WAR	WM	Con	Con	33,657	62.9%	21,958	73.8%	33,657	11,699	6,357			1,345							474	53,532
Streatham	LND	LND	Lab	Lab	38,212	68.5%	26,285	70.9%	11,927	38,212	3,611		349	1,696								55,795
Stretford and Urmston	GTM	NW	Lab	Lab	33,519	66.8%	19,705	69.9%	13,814	33,519	1,001		1,094	641							122	50,191
Stroud	GLS	SW	Con	Lab	29,994	47.0%	687	77.0%	29,307	29,994	2,053		1,039	1,423								63,816
Suffolk Coastal	SFK	E	Con	Con	33,713	58.1%	16,012	73.2%	33,713	17,701	4,048			1,802							810	58,074
Sunderland Central	TWR	NE	Lab	Lab	25,056	55.5%	9,997	62.0%	15,059	25,056	1,777		2,209	705							305	45,111
Surrey Heath	SRY	SE	Con	Con	37,118	64.2%	24,943	71.6%	37,118	12,175	6,271			2,258								57,822
Sutton and Cheam	LND	LND	Con	Con	26,567	51.1%	12,698	73.8%	26,567	10,663	13,869			871								51,970
Sutton Coldfield	WMD	WM	Con	Con	32,224	61.0%	15,339	69.9%	32,224	16,885	2,302			965							482	52,858
Swansea East	WGM	WLS	Lab	Lab	22,307	63.4%	13,168	60.1%	9,139	22,307	625		1,040	359			1,689					35,159
Swansea West	WGM	WLS	Lab	Lab	22,278	59.8%	10,598	65.5%	11,680	22,278	1,269			434			1,529				92	37,282
Tamworth	STS	WM	Con	Con	28,748	61.0%	12,347	66.1%	28,748	16,401	1,961											47,110
Tatton	CHS	NW	Con	Con	28,764	58.6%	14,787	72.4%	28,764	13,977	4,431			1,024							920	49,116
Taunton Deane	SOM	SW	Con	Con	33,333	52.9%	15,887	73.8%	33,333	9,689	17,446		1,434	1,151								63,053
Telford	SAL	WM	Con	Con	21,777	48.7%	720	65.6%	21,777	21,057	954			898								44,686
Tewkesbury	GLS	SW	Con	Con	35,448	60.0%	22,574	72.5%	35,448	12,874	7,981		1,205	1,576								59,084
The Cotswolds	GLS	SW	Con	Con	36,201	60.6%	25,499	74.2%	36,201	10,702	9,748		1,197	1,747							107	59,702
The Wrekin	SAL	WM	Con	Con	27,451	55.4%	9,564	72.2%	27,451	17,887	1,345		1,656	804							380	49,523
Thirsk and Malton	NYK	YTH	Con	Con	33,572	60.0%	19,001	71.1%	33,572	14,571	3,859		1,532	1,100							1,295	55,929
Thornbury and Yate	AVN	SW	Con	Con	28,008	55.3%	12,071	74.7%	28,008	6,112	15,937			633								50,690
Thurrock	ESS	E	Con	Con	19,880	39.5%	345	64.4%	19,880	19,535	798		10,112									50,325
Tiverton and Honiton	DEV	SW	Con	Con	35,471	61.4%	19,801	71.6%	35,471	15,670	4,639			2,035								57,815
Tonbridge and Malling	KEN	SE	Con	Con	36,218	63.6%	23,508	73.5%	36,218	12,710	3,787		1,857	2,335								56,907
Tooting	LND	LND	Lab	Lab	34,694	59.6%	15,458	74.6%	19,236	34,694	3,057		339	845								58,171
Torbay	DEV	SW	Con	Con	27,141	53.0%	14,283	67.4%	27,141	9,310	12,858		1,213	652								51,174
Torfaen	GNT	WLS	Lab	Lab	22,134	57.6%	10,240	62.1%	11,894	22,134	852		1,490				2,059					38,429
Torridge and West Devon	DEV	SW	Con	Con	33,612	56.5%	20,686	73.9%	33,612	12,926	10,526			1,622							794	59,480
Totnes	DEV	SW	Con	Con	26,972	53.7%	13,477	72.9%	26,972	13,495	6,466		1,240	2,097								50,270
Tottenham	LND	LND	Lab	Lab	40,249	81.6%	34,584	67.7%	5,665	40,249	1,687		462	1,276								49,339
Truro and Falmouth	CUL	SW	Con	Con	25,123	44.4%	3,792	75.8%	25,123	21,331	8,465		897	831								56,647
Tunbridge Wells	KEN	SE	Con	Con	30,856	56.9%	16,465	72.5%	30,856	14,391	5,355		1,464	1,441							702	54,209
Twickenham	LND	LND	Con	LD	34,969	52.8%	9,762	79.5%	25,207	6,114	34,969											66,290
Tynemouth	TWR	NE	Lab	Lab	32,395	57.0%	11,666	73.4%	20,729	32,395	1,724		1,257	629							124	56,858
Upper Bann	NIR	NIR	DUP	DUP	22,317	43.5%	7,992	63.9%							22,317	14,325		4,397	7,900	2,319		51,258
Uxbridge and South Ruislip	LND	LND	Con	Con	23,716	50.8%	5,034	66.8%	23,716	18,682	1,835		1,577	884								46,694
Vale of Clwyd	CON	WLS	Con	Lab	19,423	50.2%	2,379	68.0%	17,044	19,423	666						1,551					38,684
Vale of Glamorgan	SGM	WLS	Con	Con	25,501	47.5%	2,190	72.6%	25,501	23,311	1,020		868	419			2,295				304	53,718
Vauxhall	LND	LND	Lab	Lab	31,576	57.4%	20,250	67.1%	10,277	31,576	11,326			1,152							711	55,042
Wakefield	WYK	YTH	Lab	Lab	22,987	49.7%	2,176	65.8%	20,811	22,987	943										1,543	46,284
Wallasey	MSY	NW	Lab	Lab	34,552	71.5%	23,320	71.7%	11,232	34,552	772		1,160	637								48,353
Walsall North	WMD	WM	Lab	Con	18,919	49.6%	2,601	56.6%	18,919	16,318	586		2,295									38,118
Walsall South	WMD	WM	Lab	Lab	25,286	57.4%	8,892	65.4%	16,394	25,286	587		1,805									44,072
Walthamstow	LND	LND	Lab	Lab	38,793	80.6%	32,017	70.8%	6,776	38,793	1,384			1,190								48,143
Wansbeck	NBL	NE	Lab	Lab	24,338	57.3%	10,435	68.3%	13,903	24,338	2,015		1,483	715								42,454
Wantage	OXF	SE	Con	Con	34,459	54.2%	17,380	74.1%	34,459	17,079	9,234		1,284	1,546								63,602
Warley	WMD	WM	Lab	Lab	27,004	67.2%	16,483	63.1%	10,521	27,004	777		1,349	555								40,206
Warrington North	CHS	NW	Lab	Lab	27,356	56.4%	9,582	67.5%	17,774	27,356	1,207		1,561	619								48,517
Warrington South	CHS	NW	Con	Lab	29,994	48.4%	2,549	72.4%	27,445	29,994	3,339										1,217	61,995
Warwick and Leamington	WAR	WM	Con	Lab	25,227	46.7%	1,206	72.8%	24,021	25,227	2,810		799	1,198								54,055
Washington and Sunderland West	TWR	NE	Lab	Lab	24,639	60.7%	12,940	60.3%	11,699	24,639	961		2,761	514								40,574
Watford	HRT	E	Con	Con	26,731	45.6%	2,092	67.8%	26,731	24,639	5,335		1,184	721								58,610
Waveney	SFK	E	Con	Con	28,643	54.4%	9,215	65.2%	28,643	19,428	1,012		1,933	1,332							326	52,674
Wealden	SXE	SE	Con	Con	37,027	61.2%	23,628	74.3%	37,027	13,399	6,281		1,798	1,959								60,464
Weaver Vale	CHS	NW	Con	Lab	26,066	51.5%	3,928	73.3%	22,138	26,066	1,623			786								50,613
Wellingborough	NTH	EM	Con	Con	30,579	57.4%	12,460	67.2%	30,579	18,119	1,782		1,804	956								53,240
Wells	SOM	SW	Con	Con	30,488	50.1%	7,582	73.8%	30,488	7,129	22,906										320	60,843
Welwyn Hatfield	HRT	E	Con	Con	26,374	51.0%	7,369	70.9%	26,374	19,005	3,836		1,441	835							178	51,669
Wentworth and Dearne	SYK	YTH	Lab	Lab	28,547	65.0%	14,803	58.7%	13,744	28,547	1,656											43,947
West Aberdeenshire and Kincardine	SCT	SCT	SNP	Con	24,704	47.9%	7,950	71.2%	24,704	5,706	4,461	16,754										51,625
West Bromwich East	WMD	WM	Lab	Lab	22,664	58.0%	7,713	61.2%	14,951	22,664	625			533							325	39,098
West Bromwich West	WMD	WM	Lab	Lab	18,789	52.1%	4,460	54.7%	14,329	18,789	333		2,320	323								36,094
West Dorset	DOR	SW	Con	Con	33,081	55.5%	19,091	72.4%	33,081	10,896	13,990			1,631								59,598
West Dunbartonshire	SCT	SCT	SNP	SNP	18,890	42.9%	2,288	65.2%	7,582	16,602	1,009	18,890										44,083
West Ham	LND	LND	Lab	Lab	46,591	76.7%	36,754	65.7%	9,837	46,591	1,836		1,134	957							353	60,708
West Lancashire	LAN	NW	Lab	Lab	32,030	58.9%	11,689	74.2%	20,341	32,030	1,069			680							269	54,389
West Suffolk	SFK	E	Con	Con	31,649	61.2%	17,063	66.9%	31,649	14,586	2,180		2,396	935								51,746
West Tyrone	NIR	NIR	SF	SF	22,060	50.7%	10,342	67.9%						427	11,718	22,060		5,635	2,253	1,000	393	43,486
West Worcestershire	HWR	WM	Con	Con	34,703	61.5%	21,328	75.9%	34,703	13,375	5,307		1,481	1,605								56,471
Westminster North	LND	LND	Lab	Lab	25,934	59.9%	11,512	67.8%	14,422	25,934	2,253			595							91	43,295
Westmorland and Lonsdale	CMA	NW	LD	LD	23,686	45.8%	777	77.9%	22,909	4,783	23,686										309	51,687
Weston-super-Mare	AVN	SW	Con	Con	29,982	53.1%	11,544	68.7%	29,982	18,438	5,175		1,932	888								56,415
Wigan	GTM	NW	Lab	Lab	29,575	62.2%	16,027	63.1%	13,548	29,575	916		2,750	753								47,542
Wimbledon	LND	LND	Con	Con	23,946	46.5%	5,622	77.2%	23,946	18,324	7,472		553	1,231								51,526
Winchester	HAM	SE	Con	Con	29,729	52.0%	9,999	78.8%	29,729	6,007	19,730		695	846							149	57,156
Windsor	BRK	SE	Con	Con	34,718	64.4%	22,384	73.3%	34,718	12,334	5,434			1,435								53,921
Wirral South	MSY	NW	Lab	Lab	25,871	57.2%	8,323	78.4%	17,548	25,871	1,322			454								45,195
Wirral West	MSY	NW	Lab	Lab	23,866	54.3%	5,365	78.5%	18,501	23,866	1,155			429								43,951
Witham	ESS	E	Con	Con	31,670	64.3%	18,646	71.2%	31,670	13,024	2,715			1,832								49,241
Witney	OXF	SE	Con	Con	33,839	55.5%	21,241	73.6%	33,839	12,598	12,457		980	1,053								60,927
Woking	SRY	SE	Con	Con	29,903	54.1%	16,724	72.5%	29,903	13,179	9,711		1,161	1,092							200	55,246
Wokingham	BRK	SE	Con	Con	33,806	56.6%	18,798	75.5%	33,806	15,008	9,512			1,364								59,690
Wolverhampton North East	WMD	WM	Lab	Lab	19,282	52.8%	4,587	60.1%	14,695	19,282	570		1,479	482								36,508
Wolverhampton South East	WMD	WM	Lab	Lab	21,137	58.2%	8,514	60.2%	12,623	21,137	448		1,675	421								36,304
Wolverhampton South West	WMD	WM	Lab	Lab	20,899	49.4%	2,185	70.6%	18,714	20,899	784		1,012	579							358	42,346
Worcester	HWR	WM	Con	Con	24,731	48.1%	2,508	69.6%	24,731	22,223	1,757		1,354	1,211							147	51,423
Workington	CMA	NW	Lab	Lab	21,317	51.1%	3,925	69.2%	17,392	21,317	1,133		1,556								278	41,676
Worsley and Eccles South	GTM	NW	Lab	Lab	26,046	57.1%	8,379	61.9%	17,667	26,046	1,087			842								45,642
Worthing West	WSX	SE	Con	Con	30,181	55.4%	12,090	70.1%	30,181	18,091	2,982		1,635	1,614								54,503
Wrexham	CON	WLS	Lab	Lab	17,153	48.9%	1,832	70.4%	15,321	17,153	865						1,753					35,092
Wycombe	BKM	SE	Con	Con	26,766	50.0%	6,578	69.4%	26,766	20,188	4,147		1,210	1,182								53,493
Wyre and Preston North	LAN	NW	Con	Con	30,684	58.3%	12,246	72.8%	30,684	18,438	2,551			973								52,646
Wyre Forest	HWR	WM	Con	Con	29,859	58.4%	13,334	65.8%	29,859	16,525	1,943		1,777	1,025								51,129
Wythenshawe and Sale East	GTM	NW	Lab	Lab	28,525	62.2%	14,944	60.0%	13,581	28,525	1,504		1,475	576							185	45,846
Yeovil	SOM	SW	Con	Con	32,369	54.5%	14,723	71.6%	32,369	7,418	17,646			1,052							919	59,404
Ynys Môn	GWN	WLS	Lab	Lab	15,643	41.9%	5,259	70.6%	10,384	15,643	479		624				10,237					37,367
York Central	NYK	YTH	Lab	Lab	34,594	65.2%	18,575	68.7%	16,019	34,594	2,475											53,088
York Outer	NYK	YTH	Con	Con	29,356	51.1%	8,289	75.7%	29,356	21,067	5,910			1,094								57,427
Total for all constituencies								68.8%	13,636,684	12,877,918	2,371,861	977,568	594,068	525,665	292,316	238,915	164,466	95,419	83,280	64,553	281,471	32,204,184
Total for all constituencies								68.8%	42.34%	39.99%	7.37%	3.04%	1.84%	1.63%	0.91%	0.74%	0.51%	0.30%	0.26%	0.20%	0.87%	100.0%
Total for all constituencies								68.8%	Seats													
Total for all constituencies								68.8%	317	262	12	35	0	1	10	7	4	0	0	0	2	650
Total for all constituencies								68.8%	48.8%	40.3%	1.8%	5.4%	0.0%	0.2%	1.5%	1.1%	0.6%	0.0%	0.0%	0.0%	0.3%	100.0%

== See also ==
- Results of the 2015 United Kingdom general election
- Results of the 2019 United Kingdom general election
- List of political parties in the United Kingdom
- List of United Kingdom by-elections (2010–present)
- Opinion polling for the 2017 United Kingdom general election
