= Demographics of Tees Valley =

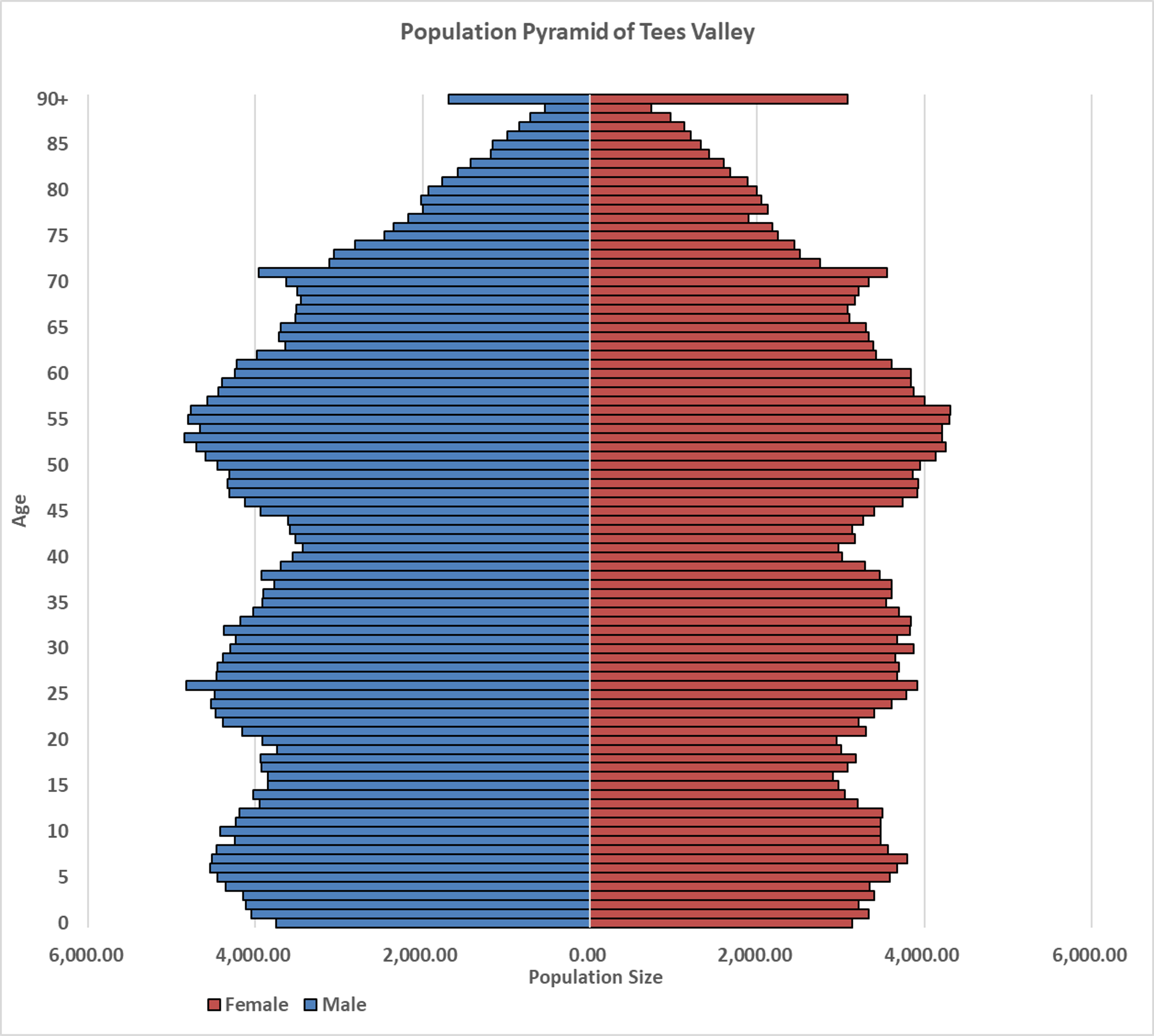
- Population pyramid in 2021
- Population: ▲678,400 (2021)
- Density: 886 people/km² (2021)
- Growth rate: ▲15,400 (2021 from 2011)

Age structure
- 0–14 years: 114,646
- 15–64 years: 388,268
- 65 and over: 117,059

Nationality
- Nationality: British citizen
- Major ethnic: White (92.1%)
- Minor ethnic: ▲ Asian (4.4%); ▲ Black (1.1%); ▲ Multiracial (2.1%); ▲ Other (1.1%)

Language
- Official: English

The Tees Valley is an economic region and strategic authority area in the North East of England. It had a population of approximately 678,000 as of official 2024 estimates.

Demographic data for the region is fragmented due to the history of its statistical geography. The Teesside urban area centred on Middlesbrough and Stockton-on-Tees has undergone several changes to local government boundaries. These changes have subsequently altered the definition of the economic region for statistical purposes. The Teesside area was in a single non-metropolitan county between 1974 and 1998, but this excluded Darlington, which is now in the Tees Valley.

1
2
Darlington
- 112,489
- 197 mi^{2}
Hartlepool
- 98,180
- 94 mi^{2}

3
4
Stockton-on-Tees
- 206,800
- 205 mi^{2}
Middlesbrough
- 156,161
- 54 mi^{2}

5
Redcar and Cleveland
- 139,228
- 245 mi^{2}

== Data fragmentation ==
Demographic data for the Tees Valley or Teesside metropolitan area of England is recorded with differing definitions. The area's fragmented data into different area definitions every other census after 1971 has meant a lack of clear lineal correlation analysis and anachronistic data.

The first recording of the multiple towns in the area with combined statistics was the 1971 census, during the 1968–1974 borough of Teesside's existence. By the 1981 and 1991 censuses the borough had been split into three (Middlesbrough, Stockton-On-Tees and what is now known as Redcar and Cleveland) with the additional Borough of Hartlepool to form the County of Cleveland for the combined statistical data of the area. For the 2001 and 2011 Censuses, the county had been abolished with an area recorded (between the size of the Teesside borough and the three replacement boroughs) as an urban area and built-up area respectively. The former county's four boroughs and the Borough of Darlington are now recorded as the Tees Valley Combined Authority mayoral area which was created in 2016 with its first census in 2021.

== Population ==
Population of Tees Valley by district (2024)
District	Land area		Population		Density (/km^{2})
District	(km^{2})	(%)	People	(%)	Density (/km^{2})
Darlington	197	25%	112,489	16%	570
Hartlepool	94	12%	98,180	14%	1,048
Middlesbrough	54	7%	156,161	22%	2,898
Redcar and Cleveland	245	31%	139,228	20%	568
Stockton-on-Tees	205	26%	206,800	29%	1,009
Tees Valley	795	100%	712,858	100%	897

=== Modern ===
This is using reliable and government given statistics, both as combined data and broken down to Unitary Area divisions.

Population Change of Tees Valley
Census year	Total Population	Population Increase		Middlesbrough		Stockton-On-Tees		Redcar and Cleveland		Darlington		Hartlepool	
Census year	Total Population	%	Actual	Total	% Change	Total	% Change	Total	% Change	Total	% Change	Total	% Change
1981	(No Combined Data)	-	-	150,600	-	173,900	-	150,900	-	98,600	-	94,900	-
1991	(No Combined Data)	-	-	144,700	-3.92	175,200	0.75	145,900	-3.31	99,300	0.71	91,100	-4
2001	652,200	-	-	141,200	-2.42	183,800	4.91	139,200	-4.59	97,900	-1.41	90,200	-0.99
2011	663,000	1.66	10,800	138,400	-1.98	191,800	4.35	135,200	-2.87	105,600	7.87	92,100	2.11
2021	678,400	2.32	15,400	143,000	3.32	197,000	2.71	136,600	1.04	108,200	2.46	92,600	0.54

=== Historical ===
The following information cannot be easily compared to the modern data, due to the fact that the administrative areas of the modern districts do not fully map to that of historical land divisions, meaning the population estimates for before 1981 must be taken with this context.

The University of Portsmouth mapped out historic data from 1801 to 1911, using modern Unitary Area land divisions to try and create estimates for what the population for each borough was like. The created estimates cannot be described as accurate, but use the non profit organisation UK Data Service's collection of sources, specifically the GBHDB.

University of Portsmouth Population Estimates
Year	Total Population	Population Increase		Middlesbrough		Stockton-On-Tees		Redcar and Cleveland		Darlington		Hartlepool	
Year	Total Population	%	Actual	Total	% Change	Total	% Change	Total	% Change	Total	% Change	Total	% Change
1801	27,506	-	-	1,699	-	7,121	-	6,516	-	8,836	-	3,334	-
1811	28,631	4.09	1,125	1,735	2.12	7,372	3.52	6,714	3.04	9,356	5.89	3,454	3.6
1821	31,858	11.27	3,227	1,963	13.14	8,333	13.04	7,190	7.09	10,470	11.91	3,902	12.97
1831	37,405	17.41	5,547	2,132	8.61	9,975	19.7	7,228	0.53	13,379	27.78	4,691	20.22
1841	48,998	30.99	11,593	2,786	30.68	15,929	59.69	6,907	-4.44	15,801	18.1	7,575	61.48
1851	58,910	20.23	9,912	3,334	19.67	21,026	32	7,995	15.75	16,508	4.47	10,047	32.63
1861	96,181	63.27	37,271	4,233	26.96	27,953	32.94	14,474	81.04	20,333	23.17	29,188	190.51
1871	-	-	-	-	-	-	-	-	-	-	-	-	-
1881	277,991	-	-	61,556	-	65,017	-	58,107	-	44,713	-	48,598	-
1891	337,313	21.34	59,322	81,711	32.74	80,665	24.07	61,303	5.5	47,047	5.22	66,587	37.02
1901	-	-	-	-	-	-	-	-	-	-	-	-	-
1911	444,803	-	-	114,417	-	91,582	-	84,838	-	66,038	-	87,928	-
1921	493,225	10.89	48,422	129,376	13.07	102,508	11.93	93,120	9.76	74,899	13.42	93,322	6.13
1931	519,245	5.28	26,020	137,810	6.52	115,979	13.14	92,389	-0.79	80,342	7.27	92,725	-0.64
1941	-	-	-	-	-	-	-	-	-	-	-	-	-
1951	568,536	-	-	147,034	-	130,191	-	103,907	-	94,759	-	92,645	-
1961	621,695	9.35	53,159	161,778	10.03	146,975	12.89	120,500	15.97	94,947	0.2	97,495	5.24
1971	665,255	7.01	43,560	99,606	-38.43	180,909	23.09	189,741	57.46	97,702	2.9	97,297	-0.2
1981	657,988	-1.09	-7,267	147,418	48	171,165	-5.39	149,857	-21.02	95,622	-2.13	93,926	-3.46
1991	649,183	-1.34	-8,805	140,857	-4.45	173,900	1.6	145,119	-3.16	98,912	3.44	90,395	-3.76
2001	638,847	-1.59	-10,336	134,832	-4.28	178,447	2.61	139,125	-4.13	97,817	-1.11	88,626	-1.96
2011	662,791	3.75	23,944	138,412	2.66	191,610	7.38	135,177	-2.84	105,564	7.92	92,028	3.84

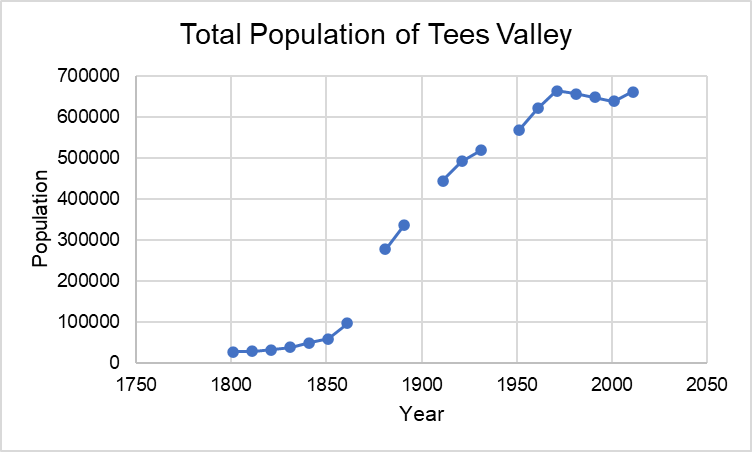
(Estimated) Total population of Tees Valley

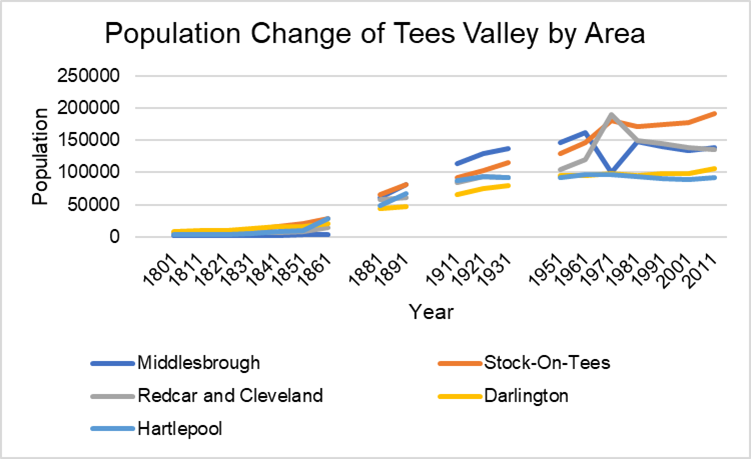
(Estimated) Historical Population by Region

The 1911 Preliminary Census Report, was a short summary of the changes in populations of the UK. In the section for towns, the settlements of Middlesbrough, Stockton, and Darlington are mentioned with details about their overall population change.

1911 Preliminary Census Report
Year	Total Population	Population Increase		Middlesbrough		Stockton-On-Tees		Redcar and Cleveland		Darlington		Hartlepool	
Year	Total Population	%	Actual	Total	% Change	Total	% Change	Total	% Change	Total	% Change	Total	% Change
1891	-	-	-	75,532	-	49,708	-	-	-	38,060	-	-	-
1901	-	-	-	91,302	+20.9	51,478	+3.6	-	-	44,511	+16.9	-	-
1911	-	-	-	104,787	+14.8	52,158	+1.3	-	-	55,633	+25.0	-	-

== Economy ==
Year	Employment Rate (%)		Unemployment Rate (%)		GDP/Head at Current Market Prices		Inward FDI (£ Millions)	
Year	Tees Valley	Avg. CA (Note: Values from the average (median) of all combined authorities.)	Tees Valley	Avg. CA	Tees Valley	Avg. CA	Tees Valley	Avg. CA
2000	-	-	-	-	£14,178	£15,121	-	-
2001	-	-	-	-	£14,432	£15,949	-	-
2002	-	-	-	-	£15,148	£16,776	-	-
2003	-	-	-	-	£16,194	£17,512	-	-
2004	68.3	69.4	32.2	27.5	£17,203	£18,653	-	-
2005	68.6	70.0	30.7	27.4	£17,703	£19,447	-	-
2006	68.9	69.1	6.1	6.5	£18.493	£20,080	-	-
2007	68.1	69.9	7.0	5.9	£19,028	£20,616	-	-
2008	66.4	68.8	8.3	7.3	£19.569	£20,829	-	-
2009	65.0	66.7	10.0	9.7	£19,404	£20,139	-	-
2010	65.1	66.9	10.7	9.2	£19.661	£20,828	-	-
2011	63.2	65.8	12.2	9.8	£20.091	£21,424	-	-
2012	64.2	66.7	12.8	9.7	£20,339	£21,927	-	-
2013	66.5	67.3	10.7	9.5	£20,715	£22,333	-	-
2014	67.0	69.1	10.0	8.0	£21,540	£23,098	-	-
2015	68.8	70.6	8.4	6.8	£22,588	£23,912	£4,423	£12,589
2016	68.9	70.5	6.4	6.2	£22,745	£24,897	£4,587	£14,327
2017	68.6	71.5	6.8	5.3	£22,674	£25,773	£9,740	£14,058
2018	68.4	72.5	7.1	4.5	£23,191	£26,251	£9.882	£13,543
2019	68.7	72.5	6.4	4.9	£23,676	£26,809	£8,725	£14,926
2020	70.1	72.5	6.0	5.5	£22,607	£24,822	£6,006	£19,158
2021	69.5	72.0	5.1	6.6	£24,222	£27,221	£5,549	£19,607
2022	71.0	72.9	4.2	4.4	£25,910	£29,646	-	-
2023	72.3	72.5	4.8	4.0	-	-	-	-

== Religion, Language and Identity ==
=== Religion ===
The religious statistics for 2021 for the Tees Valley Combined Authority, were released in the December 2022 statistics. For the area, the largest recorded group were Christian (50.7%), followed by None Religious (39.0%), the third largest was No Answer (5.2%), those identifying as Muslim came fourth (3.8%). The rest of the categories were all less than 1%, and so approximations of their total size may be inaccurate due to accuracy loss. Those identifying as Hindu were the fifth largest (0.5%), followed by equal percentages for Buddhist, Sikh and 'Other Religion'. Those identifying as Jewish recorded less than 0.1%, so the recorded number is unknown.

2021 Religious Data
Religion	Tees Valley CA (Approximate)		England %
Religion	Capita	%	England %
No religion	264,108	39.0	36.7
Christian	343,340	50.7	46.3
Buddhist	2,032	0.3	0.5
Hindu	3,386	0.5	1.8
Jewish	-	0.0 (Note: The percentage may not equal 0% in the census, but rather the value is too small to represent in the provided accuracy. It may also not be publicly released for data protection reasons if the sample is too small.)	0.5
Muslim	25,734	3.8	6.7
Sikh	2,032	0.3	0.9
Other religion	2,032	0.3	0.6
Not answered	35,214	5.2	6.0

=== Language ===
2021 Proficiency in English (Of those above 3 years old)
Category	Tees Valley CA	England
Main language is English	96.4%	90.8%
Can speak English very well	1.4%	4%
Can speak English well	1.3%	3.3%
Cannot speak English well	0.8%	1.6%
Cannot speak English	0.1%	0.3%

=== Ethnicity and Identity ===
2021 Ethnicity of Tees Valley
Category	Tees Valley CA	England
Asian, Asian British or Asian Welsh	4.4%	9.6%
Black, Black British, Black Welsh, Caribbean or African	1.1%	4.2%
Mixed or Multiple ethnic groups	1.3%	3%
White	92.1%	81%
Other ethnic group	1.1%	2.2%

Ethnicity Break Down
Area	Category	2011		2021	
Area	Category	Number	%	Number	%
Tees Valley CA	Total	663,000	100	678,400	100
Tees Valley CA	Asian, Asian British or Asian Welsh	-	-	29,849	4.4
Tees Valley CA	Black, Black British, Black Welsh, Caribbean or African	-	-	7,462	1.1
Tees Valley CA	Mixed or Multiple ethnic groups	-	-	8,819	1.3
Tees Valley CA	White	-	-	624,806	92.1
Tees Valley CA	Other ethnic group	-	-	7,462	1.1
Middlesbrough	Total	138,400	100	143,000	100
Middlesbrough	Asian, Asian British or Asian Welsh	10,795	7.8	15,015	10.5
Middlesbrough	Black, Black British, Black Welsh, Caribbean or African	1,799	1.3	3861	2.7
Middlesbrough	Mixed or Multiple ethnic groups	2353	1.7	3003	2.1
Middlesbrough	White	122,069	88.2	117832	82.4
Middlesbrough	Other ethnic group	1522	1.1	3432	2.4
Stockton-On-Tees	Total	191,800	100	197,000	100
Stockton-On-Tees	Asian, Asian British or Asian Welsh	6713	3.5	9062	4.6
Stockton-On-Tees	Black, Black British, Black Welsh, Caribbean or African	1151	0.6	2167	1.1
Stockton-On-Tees	Mixed or Multiple ethnic groups	1918	1.0	2758	1.4
Stockton-On-Tees	White	181,443	94.6	181,240	92.0
Stockton-On-Tees	Other ethnic group	575	0.3	1576	0.8
Redcar and Cleveland	Total	135,200	100	136,600	100
Redcar and Cleveland	Asian, Asian British or Asian Welsh	811	0.6	1093	0.8
Redcar and Cleveland	Black, Black British, Black Welsh, Caribbean or African	135	0.1	273	0.2
Redcar and Cleveland	Mixed or Multiple ethnic groups	811	0.6	1229	0.9
Redcar and Cleveland	White	133172	98.5	133,458	97.7
Redcar and Cleveland	Other ethnic group	135	0.1	546	0.4
Darlington	Total	105,600	100	108,200	100
Darlington	Asian, Asian British or Asian Welsh	2218	2.1	3030	2.8
Darlington	Black, Black British, Black Welsh, Caribbean or African	317	0.3	757	0.7
Darlington	Mixed or Multiple ethnic groups	1162	1.1	1515	1.4
Darlington	White	101,587	96.2	102,141	94.4
Darlington	Other ethnic group	211	0.2	974	0.9
Hartlepool	Total	92,100	100	92,600	100
Hartlepool	Asian, Asian British or Asian Welsh	1289	1.4	1574	1.7
Hartlepool	Black, Black British, Black Welsh, Caribbean or African	184	0.2	463	0.5
Hartlepool	Mixed or Multiple ethnic groups	553	0.6	648	0.7
Hartlepool	White	89,982	97.7	89,359	96.5
Hartlepool	Other ethnic group	92	0.1	556	0.6

National Identity
Category	Tees Valley CA	England
One or more UK identity only	95.5%	88%
UK identity and non-UK identity	0.7%	2%
Non-UK identity only	3.9%	10%

National Identity Breakdown
Year	Category	2011		2021	
Year	Category	Number	%	Number	%
Tees Valley CA	Total	663,000	100	678,400	100
Tees Valley CA	One or more UK identity only	-	-	647872	95.5
Tees Valley CA	UK identity and non-UK identity	-	-	4748.8	0.7
Tees Valley CA	Non-UK identity only	-	-	26457.6	3.9
Middlesbrough	Total	138,400	100	143,000	100
Middlesbrough	British only identity	20344.8	14.7	82082	57.4
Middlesbrough	Welsh only identity	138	0.1	143	0.1
Middlesbrough	Welsh and British only identity	-	0.0	-	0.0
Middlesbrough	English only identity	96050	69.4	20449	14.3
Middlesbrough	English and British only identity	13148	9.5	26741	18.7
Middlesbrough	Any other combination of only UK identities	1384	1	1001	0.7
Middlesbrough	Non-UK identity only	6643	4.8	11297	7.9
Middlesbrough	UK identity and non-UK identity	554	0.4	1287	0.9
Stockton-On-Tees	Total	191,800	100	197,000	100
Stockton-On-Tees	British only identity	27044	14.1	117412	59.6
Stockton-On-Tees	Welsh only identity	384	0.2	197	0.1
Stockton-On-Tees	Welsh and British only identity	-	0.0	197	0.1
Stockton-On-Tees	English only identity	136945	71.4	31914	16.2
Stockton-On-Tees	English and British only identity	19947	10.4	38021	19.3
Stockton-On-Tees	Any other combination of only UK identities	2493	1.3	1773	0.9
Stockton-On-Tees	Non-UK identity only	4220	2.2	6107	3.1
Stockton-On-Tees	UK identity and non-UK identity	575	0.3	1379	0.7
Redcar and Cleveland	Total	135,200	100	136,600	100
Redcar and Cleveland	British only identity	17035	12.6	79638	58.3
Redcar and Cleveland	Welsh only identity	270	0.2	137	0.1
Redcar and Cleveland	Welsh and British only identity	-	0.0	137	0.1
Redcar and Cleveland	English only identity	100454	74.3	25408	18.6
Redcar and Cleveland	English and British only identity	14196	10.5	27593	20.2
Redcar and Cleveland	Any other combination of only UK identities	1758	1.3	1229	0.9
Redcar and Cleveland	Non-UK identity only	1217	0.9	2049	1.5
Redcar and Cleveland	UK identity and non-UK identity	270	0.2	546	0.4
Darlington	Total	105,600	100	108,200	100
Darlington	British only identity	15523	14.7	63081	58.3
Darlington	Welsh only identity	317	0.3	108	0.1
Darlington	Welsh and British only identity	106	0.1	108	0.1
Darlington	English only identity	73392	69.5	17961	16.6
Darlington	English and British only identity	10771	10.2	19476	18
Darlington	Any other combination of only UK identities	2112	2.0	1623	1.5
Darlington	Non-UK identity only	3062	2.9	4869	4.5
Darlington	UK identity and non-UK identity	317	0.3	974	0.9
Hartlepool	Total	92,100	100	92,600	100
Hartlepool	British only identity	10315	11.2	53152	57.4
Hartlepool	Welsh only identity	92	0.1	93	0.1
Hartlepool	Welsh and British only identity	-	0.0	93	0.1
Hartlepool	English only identity	69812	75.8	16390	17.7
Hartlepool	English and British only identity	9486	10.3	20002	21.6
Hartlepool	Any other combination of only UK identities	921	1.0	556	0.6
Hartlepool	Non-UK identity only	1289	1.4	2037	2.2
Hartlepool	UK identity and non-UK identity	184	0.2	370	0.4

Country of Birth
Category	Tees Valley CA	England
Born in the UK	93.2%	82.6%
Born outside the UK	6.8%	17.4%
