= Cleveland (county) =

Former county of North East England

Coordinates: 54.566°N 1.163°W

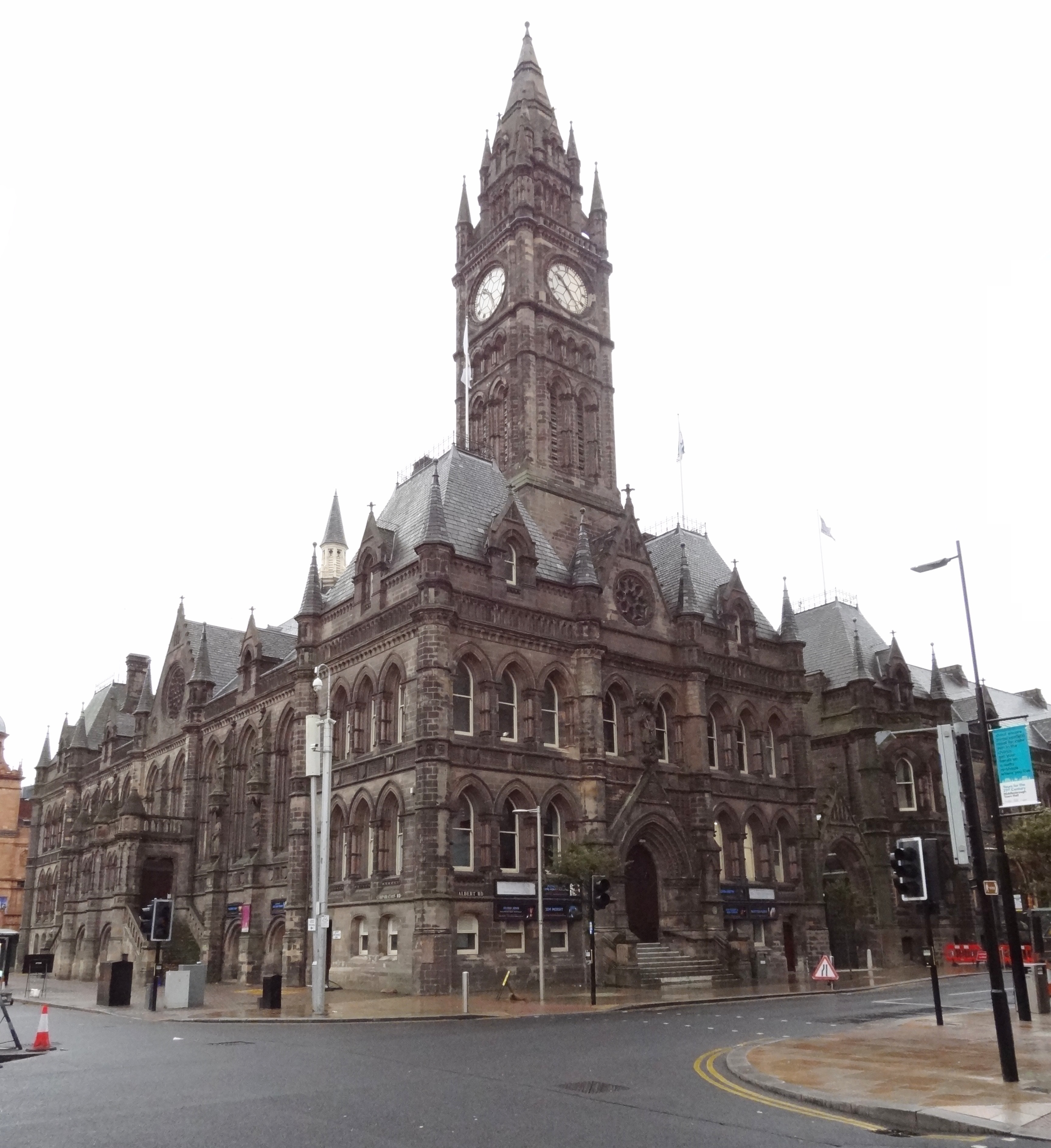
- Middlesbrough Town Hall: seat of Cleveland County Council

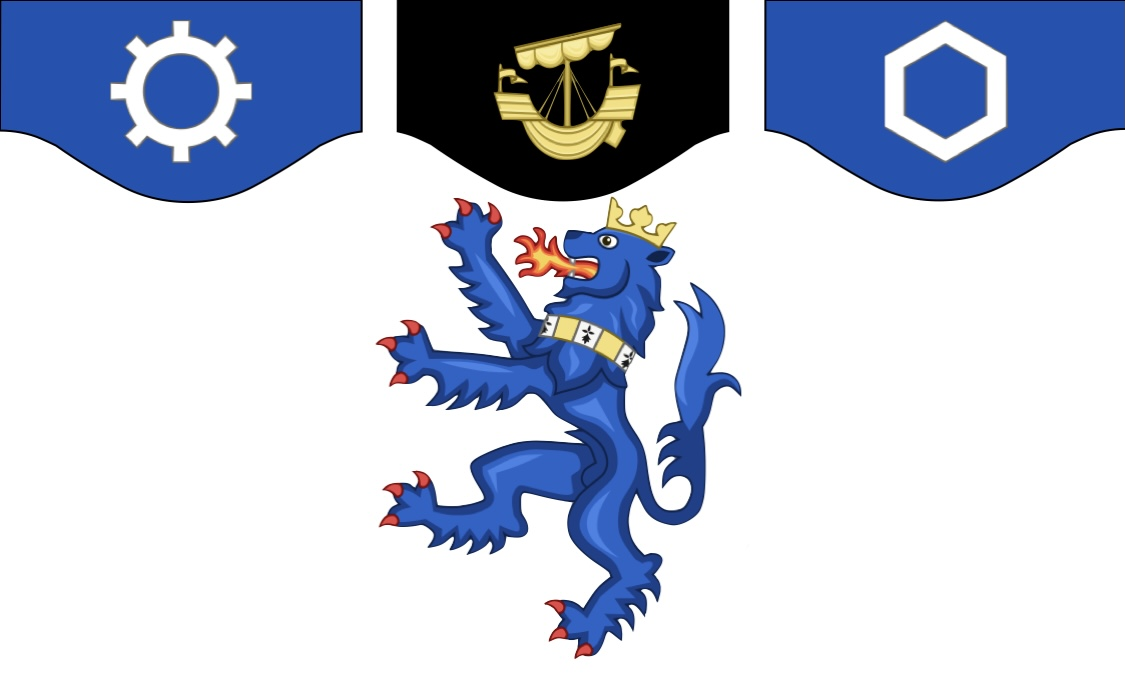
- Flag Coat of arms

- The former administrative county of Cleveland shown within England
- Area
  - 1974: 144,085 acres (583.09 km^{2})
- History
  - Origin: County Borough of Teesside
  - Created: 1974
  - Abolished: 1996
- ONS code: 14
- Government: Cleveland County Council
  - Type: Two-tier - upper-tier county council with four lower-tier non-metropolitan borough councils
  - HQ: Middlesbrough
- Subdivisions
  - Type: Non-metropolitan districts
  - Units: 1. Hartlepool; 2. Stockton-on-Tees; 3. Middlesbrough; 4. Langbaurgh-on-Tees
- Today part of: North Yorkshire and County Durham

Cleveland was a non-metropolitan county in North East England between 1974 and 1996. It was a two-tier county and had four boroughs: Hartlepool, Stockton-on-Tees, Middlesbrough and Langbaurgh-on-Tees. The county town was Middlesbrough, where Cleveland County Council met. The county was named after the historic area of Cleveland, Yorkshire. Its area is now split between the ceremonial counties of North Yorkshire and County Durham, but remains wholly within the North East England region.

The county was abolished in 1996, with its constituent boroughs becoming unitary authorities. Hartlepool and the part of Stockton-on-Tees north of the River Tees became part of County Durham, and the remainder became part of North Yorkshire. Some public bodies continue to cover the area of the former county, such as Cleveland Police and Cleveland Fire Brigade. Cleveland bordered County Durham to the north and North Yorkshire to the south, with a coastline on the North Sea to the east. It had a total area of 225 square miles (583 km^{2}).

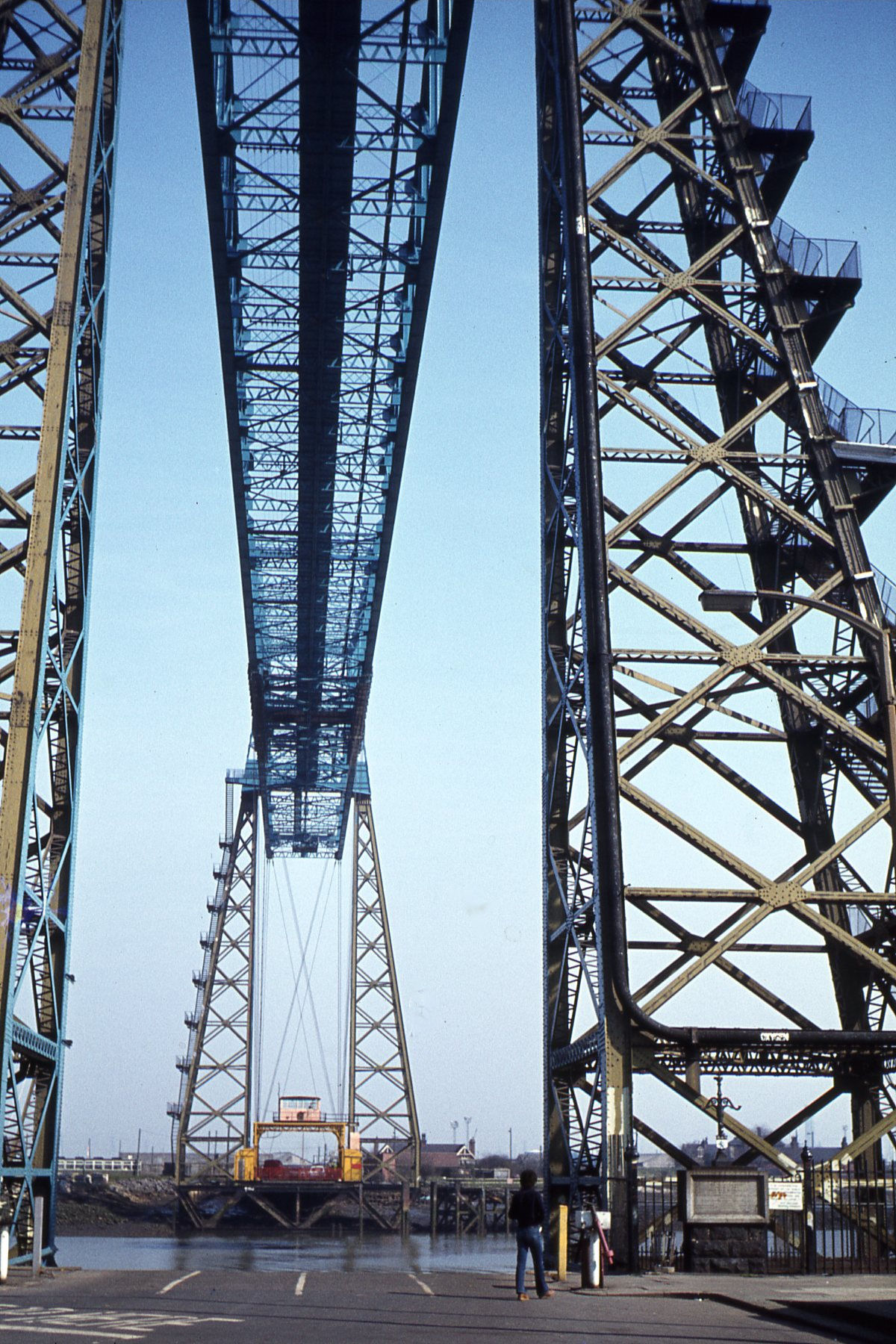
The Tees Transporter Bridge, in 1980

== Formation ==
A Bill as originally presented in November 1971 that intended the administrative county to have been an extended form of the then present County Borough of Teesside, an independent district in the North Riding from 1968 to 1974. On 1 April 1974, by the Local Government Act 1972, most of the then Cleveland constituency and Hartlepool were incorporated as the Cleveland non-metropolitan county.

== Proposed abolition ==
Local government reorganisation, recommended by the Banham Review and accepted by the government, meant that each district borough be re-organised into separate unitary authorities with the Tees be re-established as a ceremonial border between North Yorkshire and County Durham. The county district boroughs of Cleveland were re-organised into Hartlepool, Stockton-on-Tees, Middlesbrough and Redcar and Cleveland. The reorganisation meant that Stockton-on-Tees became the only local authority in England to be split between two counties.

This split was contested by Cleveland County Council, which applied for judicial review over the decision. According to the Minister, David Curry, in the Commons debate on the order on 11 January 1995, this caused a delay from 1 April 1995 as the reorganisation date to 1 April 1996.

== Abolition ==
The Cleveland (Structural Change) Order 1995 abolished the County Council (to take place on 1 April 1996) and transferred its powers to the district councils, though it did not abolish Cleveland itself. It also renamed Langbaurgh-on-Tees as Redcar and Cleveland.

The Cleveland (Further Provision) Order 1995 abolished the county of Cleveland altogether, also from 1 April 1996, creating in its place four counties corresponding to the four boroughs. However, the requirement for counties to have a council was removed for these four counties in particular. Further regulations placed each district within the ceremonial county of Durham or North Yorkshire, also splitting Stockton-on-Tees along the Tees.

== Town twinning ==
Cleveland, as a conurbation of settlements, was twinned with:

- Cleveland, Ohio, United States

== Statistical ==
NUTS statistical regions of the United Kingdom were also introduced in 1974. This caused South Humberside to be put with the reformed counties using the name Yorkshire, to form Yorkshire and Humber. South Tees came under North East of England region.

== See also ==
- Teesside
- Tees Valley
- Trolleybuses in Teesside
- Teesside Fettlers
- Demographics of Tees Valley
