= List of Last Week Tonight with John Oliver episodes =

Episode list for an American late-night talk show

Last Week Tonight with John Oliver is an American late-night talk show created and hosted by John Oliver for HBO. The show takes a satirical look at the week in news, politics and current events.

As of June 28, 2026, 380 episodes of Last Week Tonight with John Oliver have aired. The show's twelfth season premiered on February 16, 2025, with the finale airing on November 16 of the same year.

== Series overview ==
Season	Episodes	Originally released	
Season	Episodes	First released	Last released
1	24	April 27, 2014	November 9, 2014
2	35	February 8, 2015	November 22, 2015
3	30	February 14, 2016	November 13, 2016
4	30	February 12, 2017	November 12, 2017
5	30	February 18, 2018	November 18, 2018
6	30	February 17, 2019	November 17, 2019
7	30	February 16, 2020	November 15, 2020
8	30	February 14, 2021	November 14, 2021
9	30	February 20, 2022	November 20, 2022
10	21	February 19, 2023	December 17, 2023
11	30	February 18, 2024	November 17, 2024
12	30	February 16, 2025	November 16, 2025
13	30	February 15, 2026	November 15, 2026

== Episodes ==
=== Season 1 (2014) ===
List of episodes in season one
No. overall	No. in season	Main segment	Original release date	U.S. viewers (millions)
1	1	POM Wonderful LLC v. Coca-Cola Co.	April 27, 2014	1.11
2	2	Capital punishment	May 4, 2014	1.19
3	3	Climate change denial	May 11, 2014	1.01
4	4	Right to be forgotten (Google Spain v AEPD and Mario Costeja González)	May 18, 2014	1.03
5	5	Net neutrality	June 1, 2014	0.99
6	6	FIFA	June 8, 2014	0.95
7	7	Immigration reform in the United States	June 15, 2014	0.91
8	8	Dr. Oz's June 2014 Senate hearing	June 22, 2014	0.89
9	9	Burwell v. Hobby Lobby	June 29, 2014	0.85
10	10	Income inequality and wealth inequality	July 13, 2014	0.84
11	11	Incarceration in the United States	July 20, 2014	0.92
12	12	Nuclear weapons and the United States	July 27, 2014	1.00
13	13	Native advertising	August 3, 2014	0.96
14	14	Payday loans	August 10, 2014	0.94
15	15	Shooting of Michael Brown and police militarization	August 17, 2014	1.03
16	16	Student debt	September 7, 2014	0.66
17	17	Scottish independence referendum	September 14, 2014	0.70
18	18	Miss America 2015	September 21, 2014	0.83
19	19	Drones	September 28, 2014	0.71
20	20	Civil forfeiture in the United States	October 5, 2014	0.66
21	21	Special Immigrant Visa	October 19, 2014	0.62
22	22	Sugar	October 26, 2014	0.76
23	23	2014 United States state legislative elections and ALEC	November 2, 2014	0.60
24	24	Lotteries	November 9, 2014	0.80

=== Season 2 (2015) ===
List of episodes in season two
No. overall	No. in season	Main segment	Original release date	U.S. viewers (millions)
25	1	Pharmaceutical marketing	February 8, 2015	0.72
26	2	Tobacco	February 15, 2015	0.51
27	3	Judicial elections	February 22, 2015	0.47
28	4	Infrastructure	March 1, 2015	0.71
29	5	Voting rights in the US territories	March 8, 2015	0.69
30	6	National Collegiate Athletic Association	March 15, 2015	0.84
31	7	Municipal violations	March 22, 2015	0.78
32	8	Government surveillance	April 5, 2015	0.65
33	9	Internal Revenue Service	April 12, 2015	1.32
34	10	Patent trolls	April 19, 2015	1.45
35	11	Fashion	April 26, 2015	1.39
36	12	Standardized testing	May 3, 2015	1.40
37	13	Maternity leave	May 10, 2015	1.20
38	14	Poultry farming	May 17, 2015	1.04
39	15	2015 FIFA corruption case	May 31, 2015	1.39
40	16	Bail in the United States	June 7, 2015	1.26
41	17	Torture	June 14, 2015	1.26
42	18	Online harassment and revenge porn	June 21, 2015	1.37
43	19	Transgender Rights	June 28, 2015	1.24
44	20	Sports stadiums	July 12, 2015	1.01
45	21	Food waste	July 19, 2015	1.04
46	22	Mandatory sentencing	July 26, 2015	0.94
47	23	Washington D.C. voting rights and statehood movement	August 2, 2015	0.98
48	24	Sex education in the United States	August 9, 2015	0.93
49	25	Televangelism	August 16, 2015	1.01
50	26	LGBT rights in the United States	August 23, 2015	1.03
51	27	Public defenders in the United States	September 13, 2015	0.69
52	28	European migrant crisis	September 27, 2015	0.66
53	29	Mental health in the United States	October 4, 2015	0.68
54	30	North Dakota oil boom	October 11, 2015	0.70
55	31	2015 Canadian federal election	October 18, 2015	0.72
56	32	2015 United States elections and the medicaid coverage gap	November 1, 2015	0.69
57	33	Prisoner reentry	November 8, 2015	0.91
58	34	Daily fantasy sports	November 15, 2015	0.71
59	35	US pennies	November 22, 2015	0.78

=== Season 3 (2016) ===
List of episodes in season three
No. overall	No. in season	Main segment	Original release date	U.S. viewers (millions)
60	1	Voter ID laws in the United States	February 14, 2016	1.02
61	2	Abortion in the United States	February 21, 2016	0.92
62	3	Donald Trump presidential campaign, 2016	February 28, 2016	0.70
63	4	Special districts	March 6, 2016	0.82
64	5	FBI–Apple encryption dispute	March 13, 2016	0.96
65	6	Trump wall	March 20, 2016	0.93
66	7	Campaign finance in the United States	April 3, 2016	0.95
67	8	Credit score in the United States	April 10, 2016	0.91
68	9	Lead poisoning	April 17, 2016	0.85
69	10	Puerto Rican government-debt crisis	April 24, 2016	1.34
70	11	Scientific studies and science journalism	May 8, 2016	1.42
71	12	9-1-1	May 15, 2016	1.38
72	13	United States presidential primaries and caucuses	May 22, 2016	1.27
73	14	Debt buying industry	June 5, 2016	1.61
74	15	Retirement plans in the United States	June 12, 2016	1.21
75	16	Brexit referendum	June 19, 2016	1.44
76	17	Doping in sports	June 26, 2016	1.53
77	18	2016 Republican National Convention	July 24, 2016	1.09
78	19	2016 Democratic National Convention	July 31, 2016	1.27
79	20	News media in the United States	August 7, 2016	1.01
80	21	Subprime lending	August 14, 2016	0.97
81	22	Charter schools in the United States	August 21, 2016	1.15
82	23	Hillary Clinton's controversies and Donald Trump's controversies	September 25, 2016	0.88
83	24	Police in the United States	October 2, 2016	1.10
84	25	Guantanamo Bay detention camp	October 9, 2016	1.08
85	26	Jill Stein presidential campaign and Gary Johnson presidential campaign	October 16, 2016	1.34
86	27	Opioid epidemic in the United States	October 23, 2016	1.18
87	28	School segregation in the United States	October 30, 2016	1.03
88	29	Multi-level marketing	November 6, 2016	1.05
89	30	2016 United States presidential election results	November 13, 2016	1.17

=== Season 4 (2017) ===
No. overall	No. in season	Main segment	Original release date	U.S. viewers (millions)
90	1	False or misleading statements by Donald Trump	February 12, 2017	1.19
Main article: Trump vs. Truth; Guest: Actor Thomas Kopache
91	2	Vladimir Putin and Russia–United States relations	February 19, 2017	1.25
Guests: Singers and dancers Olivia Cipolla, Michaela Sprague, Nicole Medoro, Mishay Petronelli and Wesley Faucher
92	3	Affordable Care Act (Obamacare)	February 26, 2017	0.72
Other segment: Immigration policy of Donald Trump
93	4	Tibetan sovereignty debate and Human rights in Tibet	March 5, 2017	1.28
Other segment: Presidency of Donald Trump; Guests: 14th Dalai Lama
94	5	American Health Care Act	March 12, 2017	1.12
Other segments: International Women's Day, Wikileaks' March 2017 CIA disclosures Guests: Actors Thomas Kopache, Rob Corddry
95	6	United States federal budget	March 19, 2017	1.03
Other segments: Trump Tower wiretapping allegations, La Paz traffic zebras
96	7	Cannabis in the United States	April 2, 2017	1.18
Other segments: Trump Tower wiretapping allegations, United Kingdom invocation of Article 50 of the Treaty on European Union, La Paz traffic zebras Guest: Actor and puppeteer Noel MacNeal
97	8	Gerrymandering in the United States	April 9, 2017	1.15
Other segments: 2017 Shayrat missile strike, Bill O'Reilly sexual harassment lawsuits Guest: Actor Thomas Kopache
98	9	2017 French presidential election	April 16, 2017	1.18
Other segments: Sean Spicer Hitler–Assad controversy, political positions of Donald Trump, 2017 Nangarhar airstrike
99	10	Ivanka Trump and Jared Kushner	April 23, 2017	1.19
Other segments: 2017 North Korean missile tests, 2017 Turkish constitutional referendum Guest: Actor Gilbert Gottfried
100	11	Net neutrality in the United States	May 7, 2017	1.18
Main article: Net Neutrality II; Other segments: Eight Mile Style v New Zealand National Party, American Health Care Act of 2017
101	12	Kidney dialysis and DaVita Inc.	May 14, 2017	1.36
Other segments: Dismissal of James Comey, Bill English
102	13	Russian interference in the 2016 United States elections	May 21, 2017	1.42
Main article: Stupid Watergate; Other segments: Donald Trump's disclosure of classified information to Russia, Comey memos, Transportation Security Administration; Guests: Sesame Street penguins (performed by actors and puppeteers Pam Arciero, Tyler Bunch, Stephanie D'Abruzzo, and John Kennedy)
103	14	United States withdrawal from the Paris Agreement	June 4, 2017	1.22
Other segments: 2017 London Bridge attack, Russian interference in the 2016 United States elections
104	15	2017 United Kingdom general election and Brexit negotiations	June 11, 2017	1.24
Other segment: James Comey's testimony before Congress; Guest: Lord Buckethead
105	16	Coal mining in the United States and Bob Murray	June 18, 2017	1.28
Other segment: American Health Care Act of 2017; Guest: Actor and puppeteer Noel MacNeal Note: Within four days of airing of this episode, Bob Murray sued John Oliver for defamation over content presented in this episode. Murray eventually dropped his lawsuit two years later, which was the subject of the main segment of the November 10, 2019 episode.
106	17	Vaccine safety	June 25, 2017	1.31
Other segments: Lawsuit over coal segment from episode 105, possible existence of Trump–Comey recordings, Better Care Reconciliation Act of 2017
107	18	Local news and Sinclair Broadcast Group	July 2, 2017	1.14
Other segments: Donald Trump's Twitter comments about Mika Brzezinski, Trump administration's travel ban, the Hall of Presidents wax museum in Gettysburg; Guests: Actors Steve Schirripa, Campbell Scott, Anna Kendrick, Michael McKean, James Cromwell, and Laura Linney
108	19	Alex Jones and InfoWars	July 30, 2017	1.76
Other segments: Donald Trump administration's proposed transgender military ban, Anthony Scaramucci, Health Care Freedom Act of 2017; Guests: Actors Jack McBrayer, Gilbert Gottfried
109	20	United States Border Patrol	August 6, 2017	1.75
Other segments: Presidency of Donald Trump, Stephen Miller; Guests: Actor Will Arnett
110	21	2017 North Korea crisis	August 13, 2017	1.93
Other segment: Charlottesville car attack Guests: Musician "Weird Al" Yankovic
111	22	Nuclear waste	August 20, 2017	1.76
Other segments: Departure of Steve Bannon, Donald Trump's response to Charlottesville
112	23	Pardon of Joe Arpaio	September 10, 2017	0.97
Other segments: 2018 United States federal budget, rescinding of Deferred Action for Childhood Arrivals
113	24	Mergers and acquisitions	September 24, 2017	1.25
Other segments: 2017 NFL U.S. national anthem protest, Tom Price and Steven Mnuchin private jet scandals
114	25	Forensic identification	October 1, 2017	1.27
Other segments: Trump administration's tax reform proposal, aftermath of Hurricane Maria in Puerto Rico; Guests: Actors Josh Charles, Shannon Woodward, Josh Lucas, Samira Wiley, Robert John Burke
115	26	Confederate monuments and memorials	October 8, 2017	1.30
Other segments: Trump's response to Hurricane Maria's impact on Puerto Rico, Trump's feud with Rex Tillerson, Harvey Weinstein sexual abuse allegations Guest: TV host Stephen Colbert
116	27	2017 Equifax data breach	October 15, 2017	1.25
Other segments: Harvey Weinstein sexual abuse allegations, United States withdrawal from the Joint Comprehensive Plan of Action
117	28	National Flood Insurance Program	October 29, 2017	0.96
Other segments: Opioid epidemic, Roy Moore, Australian Marriage Law Postal Survey
118	29	Economic development incentives	November 5, 2017	1.01
Other segments: Mueller special counsel investigation, The Inspectors
119	30	Presidency of Donald Trump	November 12, 2017	1.20
Guests: Actors Thomas Kopache, Jack McBrayer, Tom Hanks, actor and puppeteer Noel MacNeal, Sesame Street penguins (performed by actors and puppeteers Ryan Dillon, Frankie Cordero, Peter Linz and Carmen Osbahr)

=== Season 5 (2018) ===
No. overall	No. in season	Main segment	Original release date	U.S. viewers (millions)
120	1	Trump vs. The World (soft power)	February 18, 2018	1.20
Other segments: Parkland, Florida school shooting, corruption investigations against Benjamin Netanyahu, resignation of Jacob Zuma, Barnaby Joyce
121	2	2018 Italian general election	February 25, 2018	1.11
Other segments: Judge dismissing lawsuit by Murray Energy against Last Week Tonight, Trump's proposal to arm teachers, Justin Trudeau, and Donald Trump Jr. in India
122	3	NRA TV	March 4, 2018	0.94
Other segments: Trump White House staffing challenges, Trump's steel and aluminum tariffs
123	4	Bitcoin and cryptocurrencies	March 11, 2018	1.08
Other segments: 2018 North Korea–United States summit, International Women's Day; Guests: Keegan-Michael Key
124	5	Mike Pence and the announcement of the book A Day in the Life of Marlon Bundo	March 18, 2018	1.23
Other segments: Dismissal of Rex Tillerson, poisoning of Sergei and Yulia Skripal, 2018 Russian presidential election Guests: Jim Parsons, Jesse Tyler Ferguson, John Lithgow (voice-over)
125	6	Executive Office for Immigration Review	April 1, 2018	1.26
Other segments: 2018 Egyptian presidential election, Sinclair Broadcast Group; Guests: H. Jon Benjamin
126	7	Crisis pregnancy centers	April 8, 2018	1.13
Other segments: Scott Pruitt's ethics scandals, 2018 Hungarian parliamentary election Guests: Rachel Dratch
127	8	Corporate tax avoidance in the United States, Tax Cuts and Jobs Act of 2017	April 15, 2018	1.23
Other segments: 2018 bombing of Damascus and Homs, Blockbuster Video in Alaska
128	9	Iran-United States relations, Iranian nuclear deal	April 22, 2018	1.19
Other segment: Ryan Zinke; Guests: Thomas Kopache, James Van Der Beek (voice-over)
129	10	Rudy Giuliani	May 6, 2018	1.24
Other segments: Don Blankenship and 2018 West Virginia Senate election, John Oliver Koala Chlamydia Ward
130	11	Crisis in Venezuela	May 13, 2018	1.03
Other segment: Michael Cohen consulting payments Guests: Wilmer Valderrama
131	12	Drug rehabilitation clinics	May 20, 2018	1.28
Other segments: Wedding of Prince Harry and Meghan Markle, proposed 2018 North Korea-United States summit
132	13	Legal guardianship in elder care	June 3, 2018	1.14
Other segments: Staged death of Arkady Babchenko, Thomas Mace-Archer-Mills; Guests: Neil deGrasse Tyson, Cloris Leachman, Rita Moreno, William Shatner, Lily Tomlin, Fred Willard
133	14	Stupid Watergate II, Special Counsel investigation	June 10, 2018	1.14
Other segments: United Kingdom Parliamentary censorship laws, Rodrigo Duterte; Guests: Gilbert Gottfried Note: When broadcast in the United Kingdom, the section covering its Parliamentary censorship laws was replaced with footage of Gilbert Gottfried reading aloud three-star Yelp reviews of Boise, Idaho restaurants.
134	15	China and Xi Jinping	June 17, 2018	1.19
Other segments: 2018 North Korea–United States summit, Trump administration family separation policy Guests: Ryan Barger (voiceover) and Ryan Buggle
135	16	2018 Mexican elections	June 24, 2018	0.94
Other segment: 7-Eleven commercial promoting safe sex in Norway; Guests: Bobby Moynihan
136	17	CRISPR and genome editing	July 1, 2018	1.12
Other segment: Retirement of Anthony Kennedy
137	18	Sexual harassment in the workplace in the United States	July 29, 2018	0.92
Other segments: Special Counsel investigation, Facebook stock price drop Guests: Anita Hill
138	19	District attorneys in the United States	August 5, 2018	0.99
Other segment: Trials of Paul Manafort
139	20	Astroturfing	August 12, 2018	1.03
Other segments: Unite the Right 2, Laura Ingraham, Canada-Saudi Arabia diplomatic dispute, Vilnius tourism advertisement
140	21	First Trump tariffs	August 19, 2018	1.17
Other segments: Rudy Giuliani, Fraser Anning’s maiden speech, Bob Katter
141	22	Felony voting disenfranchisement	September 9, 2018	0.90
Other segments: Brett Kavanaugh and Supreme Court lifetime appointments, International Space Station leak
142	23	Facebook and the 2017 Rohingya persecution in Myanmar	September 23, 2018	1.01
Other segment: Brett Kavanaugh sexual assault allegations Guests: Sarah Silverman, Thomas Middleditch (voice-over),
143	24	Brett Kavanaugh sexual assault allegations	September 30, 2018	1.16
Other segments: Donald Trump's speech at the UN General Assembly, new Philadelphia Flyers mascot Gritty
144	25	Jair Bolsonaro and the 2018 Brazilian general election	October 7, 2018	1.00
Other segment: Brett Kavanaugh Supreme Court nomination
145	26	Disappearance of Jamal Khashoggi and Saudi Arabia–United States relations	October 14, 2018	0.92
Other segments: 2018 Florida gubernatorial election, United States Senate election in Texas, 2018, News anchors on Instagram
146	27	State attorneys general	October 28, 2018	0.92
Other segments: 2018 United States mail bombing attempts, killing of Jamal Khashoggi, Crown Jewel
147	28	Trump administration family separation policy	November 4, 2018	0.65
Other segment: 2018 midterm elections
148	29	Drain the Swamp	November 11, 2018	0.78
Other segments: Stupid Watergate, 2018 midterm elections, social media influencers and unauthorized brand promotions
149	30	Authoritarianism	November 18, 2018	0.76
Other segments: Brexit, Russell Crowe's jockstrap Guests: Armie Hammer, Russell Crowe, Neil deGrasse Tyson, Gilbert Gottfried Note: When broadcast in the United Kingdom, the section covering Brexit was replaced with footage of Gilbert Gottfried reading aloud parts from the 585-page draft Brexit agreement, because part of it included clips from Parliament, which would breach Parliamentary censorship laws.

=== Season 6 (2019) ===
No. overall	No. in season	Main segment	Original release date	U.S. viewers (millions)
150	1	Aftermath of Brexit	February 17, 2019	1.03
Other segments: National Emergency Concerning the Southern Border of the United States, New Zealand's exclusion from world maps Guest: Stephen Fry (voice-over) Note: When broadcast in the United Kingdom, a clip from Parliament is replaced with a clip from Muscle Motion, a 1983 exercise video featuring the Chippendales.
151	2	Psychics	February 24, 2019	0.84
Other segments: William Happer, 2018 North Carolina’s 9th congressional district election fraud allegations Guest: Rachel Dratch
152	3	Automation and technological unemployment	March 3, 2019	0.97
Other segments: 2019 North Korea–United States Hanoi Summit, Michael Cohen testimony, Jared Kushner, Ivanka Trump; Guest: Gilbert Gottfried (voice-over)
153	4	Robocalls	March 10, 2019	1.08
Other segments: Presidency of Jair Bolsonaro, Donald Trump
154	5	Public and online shaming	March 17, 2019	0.95
Other segments: Christchurch mosque shootings, Fraser Anning's response to the Christchurch mosque shootings, Brexit; Guest: Monica Lewinsky Note: When broadcast in the United Kingdom, a clip from Parliament was replaced with a clip from a dating video released in 1987.
155	6	WWE and Vince McMahon	March 31, 2019	0.87
Other segment: Mueller special counsel investigation
156	7	Mobile homes and Frank Rolfe	April 7, 2019	0.92
Other segments: Stephen Moore, Herman Cain, Catherine Pugh / Healthy Holly scandal Guests: Lauren Adams, D'Arcy Carden
157	8	Update on opioid abuse and Richard Sackler ("Opioids II")	April 14, 2019	1.34
Other segments: Delay of Brexit, Julian Assange; Guests: Michael Keaton, Bryan Cranston, Michael K. Williams, Richard Kind
158	9	Mueller report	April 21, 2019	1.31
Other segment: Chiitan; Guests: Hugh Bonneville, Ryan Barger (voice-over)
159	10	Lethal injection and midazolam	May 5, 2019	1.20
Other segments: William Barr, 2019 Australian federal election (Steve Dickson, Clive Palmer & the Titanic II)
160	11	Green New Deal and carbon pricing	May 12, 2019	1.16
Other segment: Abortion laws in Georgia, Alabama, and Ohio; Guest: Bill Nye
161	12	Autopsies, coroners, and medical examiners	May 19, 2019	1.63
Other segments: Eurovision Song Contest 2019, Hatari, United States tariffs on Chinese products Guests: Glenn Close, Tracy Morgan
162	13	Medical device design	June 2, 2019	0.90
Other segments: Jared Kushner, Golan Heights, Glen Casada/Cade Cothren text message scandal Guest: Jane Krakowski
163	14	Equal Rights Amendment and Phyllis Schlafly	June 9, 2019	0.77
Other segments: Donald Trump's trip to the United Kingdom, Theresa May's resignation as Conservative Party leader, 2019 Conservative Party leadership election (Boris Johnson, Michael Gove, and Rory Stewart)
164	15	Impeachment in the United States and efforts to impeach Donald Trump	June 16, 2019	0.92
Other segments: Steve Bullock, Duncan D. Hunter campaign finance scandal
165	16	Mount Everest and Sherpa people	June 23, 2019	0.92
Other segment: Iranian shoot-down of U.S. drone
166	17	E-commerce, warehouse working conditions, Amazon and business logistics	June 30, 2019	0.84
Other segments: Donald Trump's trips to Japan, South Korea, and North Korea, Jared Kushner; Guests: Gilbert Gottfried (voice-over), Thomas Middleditch (voice-over)
167	18	Boris Johnson	July 28, 2019	0.71
Other segment: Telegramgate
168	19	Penal labor in the United States and Securus Technologies	August 4, 2019	0.81
Other segments: Boris Johnson, John Ratcliffe, Sam Clovis Note: This episode was preceded by a short monologue about the 2019 El Paso and Dayton shootings, both of which occurred earlier that weekend.
169	20	Gurbanguly Berdimuhamedow and Guinness World Records	August 11, 2019	0.85
Other segment: Update on the National Rifle Association
170	21	Sexism and racism in medicine	August 18, 2019	0.92
Other segments: Second proposed purchase of Greenland by the United States, 2019–20 Hong Kong protests Guests: Wanda Sykes, Larry David
171	22	Filibuster in the United States Senate	September 8, 2019	0.74
Other segments: Donald Trump tweet about Hurricane Dorian impact on Alabama, Boris Johnson's loss of working majority Note: When broadcast in the United Kingdom, clips from Parliament are replaced with clips from Sex Education For Girls, a 1989 educational video by Angela McNamara.
172	23	Legal Immigration to the United States	September 15, 2019	0.65
Other segments: Joe Biden 2020 presidential campaign, Timati
173	24	Compounding pharmacies	September 29, 2019	0.82
Other segment: Trump–Ukraine scandal Guests: David Schwimmer, Method Man, Jimmy Kimmel, RuPaul, Michael Bolton, Kristen Bell, Kiefer Sutherland
174	25	History of the People's Republic of China and its one-child policy	October 6, 2019	0.81
Other segment: Trump–Ukraine scandal
175	26	Weather forecasting, Barry Lee Myers and the National Weather Service	October 13, 2019	0.78
Other segments: Trump–Ukraine scandal, aftermath of Daryl Morey's tweet about Hong Kong
176	27	American abandonment of Kurds in Syria	October 27, 2019	0.89
Other segments: Killing of ISIS leader Abu Bakr al-Baghdadi, Brexit
177	28	Election security in the United States	November 3, 2019	0.72
Other segments: Trump-Ukraine scandal, Alexander Vindman; Guest: Ken Burns (voice-over)
178	29	Bob Murray and SLAPP Suits	November 10, 2019	0.73
Other segment: Roger Stone; Guest: Brian d'Arcy James Note: The main segment of this episode was inspired by Bob Murray's defamation lawsuit over the content of the June 18, 2017.
179	30	2020 United States census	November 17, 2019	0.88
Other segments: Impeachment inquiry against Donald Trump, Chiitan; Guests: Hugh Bonneville, Seth Meyers

=== Season 7 (2020) ===
Note: Due to social distancing measures put in place as a result of the COVID-19 pandemic, episode 184 was filmed at an unspecified location. Episodes 185–231 were filmed at John Oliver's home.

No. overall	No. in season	Main segment	Original release date	U.S. viewers (millions)
180	1	Medicare for All	February 16, 2020	0.82
Other segments: Aftermath of the impeachment trial, interference in sentencing of Roger Stone by President Trump
181	2	Narendra Modi and Citizenship Amendment Act protests	February 23, 2020	0.75
Other segment: Michael Bloomberg 2020 presidential campaign
182	3	Coronavirus; COVID-19 pandemic and US government response	March 1, 2020	0.93
Other segment: Phillie Phanatic; Guests: Bob Costas (voice-over)
183	4	Sheriffs in the United States	March 8, 2020	0.95
Other segments: Update on the COVID-19 pandemic in the United States, Arnab Goswami, Hotstar censorship Guests: Rob Corddry
184	5	Coronavirus II; COVID-19 pandemic, US government response, and prevention of COVID–19	March 15, 2020	0.89
Note: This shortened episode was filmed at an unspecified location with no live audience as the studio and the show's offices were shut down after employees tested positive for COVID–19. Oliver stated that the show would go on hiatus for an unspecified amount of time.
185	6	Coronavirus III; COVID-19 pandemic related shortages and social distancing	March 29, 2020	0.97
Other segments: "Art 1992" and Stay Up Late by Brian Swords of York
186	7	One America News Network	April 5, 2020	0.97
Other segment: U.S. state and local government response to the 2020 coronavirus pandemic
187	8	Coronavirus IV; Essential workers and unemployment in the COVID-19 recession	April 12, 2020	0.91
Other segments: "Art 1992" and Stay Up Late by Brian Swords of York, Queen Elizabeth II's coronavirus broadcast
188	9	Coronavirus V COVID-19 misinformation	April 19, 2020	1.04
Other segment: Wendy Williams
189	10	Coronavirus VI; COVID-19 testing in the United States	May 3, 2020	0.95
Other segment: Cats
190	11	United States Postal Service and Postal Accountability and Enhancement Act of 2006	May 10, 2020	0.83
Other segment: Michael Flynn
191	12	Coronavirus VII; Impact of the COVID-19 pandemic on sports, Jelle's Marble Runs and League	May 17, 2020	0.90
Other segment: 2020 Congressional insider trading scandal
192	13	Postal voting in the United States	May 31, 2020	0.83
Other segments: George Floyd protests, Dana White
193	14	Police brutality in the United States and George Floyd protests	June 7, 2020	0.80
194	15	Facial recognition system, Clearview AI, and Hoan Ton-That	June 14, 2020	0.67
195	16	Coronavirus VIII; COVID-19 pandemic in prisons and jails	June 21, 2020	0.86
Other segment: K-Pop fancams
196	17	Coronavirus IX; Effects of the COVID-19 pandemic on evictions	June 28, 2020	0.88
Other segment: John Schnatter on TikTok
197	18	Coronavirus X Conspiracy theories related to the COVID-19 pandemic	July 19, 2020	0.86
Other segment: Impact of the COVID-19 pandemic on education Guests: Alex Trebek, John Cena, Paul Rudd, Catherine O'Hara and Billy Porter
198	19	Uighur re-education camps in China	July 26, 2020	0.73
Other segment: George Floyd protests in Portland, Oregon
199	20	United States history	August 2, 2020	0.88
Guests: Steve Guttenberg
200	21	Jury duty and jury selection in the United States	August 16, 2020	0.66
Other segments: 2020 Democratic Party vice presidential candidate selection, Marjorie Taylor Greene and QAnon
201	22	Border Wall II; Border wall and the arrest of Steve Bannon	August 23, 2020	0.82
Other segments: 2020 Democratic National Convention, Russian interference in the 2016 United States elections
202	23	2020 Republican National Convention, Kenosha protests	August 30, 2020	0.83
Other segment: Danbury, Connecticut
203	24	The Supreme Court; Amy Coney Barrett Supreme Court nomination	September 27, 2020	0.75
Other segments: Mitch McConnell and the American electoral college, 2020 United States census
204	25	2020 United States elections	October 4, 2020	0.73
Other segments: White House COVID-19 outbreak, museums
205	26	World Health Organization	October 18, 2020	0.81
Other segment: Danbury, Connecticut; Guests: Mark Boughton
206	27	Asylum	October 25, 2020	0.88
207	28	Trump and the coronavirus, William Barr, and unitary executive theory	November 1, 2020	0.67
208	29	2020 United States election results	November 8, 2020	1.06
209	30	2020 U.S. elections and Trump's refusal to concede	November 15, 2020	0.93
Other segment: Season finale Guest: Adam Driver

=== Season 8 (2021) ===
No. overall	No. in season	Main segment	Original release date	U.S. viewers (millions)
210	1	The next pandemic	February 14, 2021	0.69
Other segments: Second impeachment trial of Donald Trump, state Republican parties Guest: Jack McBrayer (voice-over)
211	2	Meat packing during the COVID-19 pandemic	February 21, 2021	0.75
Other segments: February 13–17, 2021 North American winter storm, 2021 Texas power crisis
212	3	Police raids and no-knock warrants in the United States	February 28, 2021	0.66
Other segments: Andrew Cuomo and the New York COVID-19 nursing home scandal
213	4	Unemployment in the United States	March 7, 2021	0.59
214	5	Tucker Carlson	March 14, 2021	0.57
Other segments: American Rescue Plan Act of 2021, Oprah with Meghan and Harry
215	6	Plastic	March 21, 2021	0.69
Other segments: 2021 Atlanta spa shootings Guest: Richard Kind (voice-over), Noel MacNeal (Totes McGoats)
216	7	National debt of the United States	April 4, 2021	0.73
Other segments: Conservative response to Montero (Call Me by Your Name), Matt Gaetz sexual misconduct allegations, Amazon worker organization
217	8	Nursing home care in the United States	April 11, 2021	0.72
Other segments: Matt Gaetz sexual misconduct allegations, immigration policy of the Joe Biden administration
218	9	Bankruptcy in the United States	April 18, 2021	0.69
Other segments: Killing of Daunte Wright, disappearance of Darius, the world's longest rabbit, Usher paying strippers with fake money, Olympic outfits, Canadian member of Parliament Will Amos appearing naked on a Zoom call
219	10	COVID-19 vaccine and vaccine hesitancy	May 2, 2021	0.85
Other segments: US government agencies on Twitter
220	11	Afro-textured hair and discrimination based on hair texture in the United States	May 9, 2021	0.74
Other segments: Republican efforts to restrict voting following the 2020 presidential election, election recount in Arizona; Guests: Uzo Aduba, Leslie Jones, Craig Robinson
221	12	Stand-your-ground laws in the United States	May 16, 2021	0.80
Other segment: 2021 Israel–Palestine crisis
222	13	Sponsored content	May 23, 2021	0.77
Other segment: Dobbs v. Jackson Women's Health Organization; Guest: George Clooney
223	14	Asian Americans and racial discrimination	June 6, 2021	0.64
Other segments: COVID-19 pandemic in the United Kingdom and Brazil
224	15	Effect of climate in prisons	June 13, 2021	0.63
Other segments: 2021 New York City Democratic mayoral primary, local car commercials
225	16	PACE financing	June 20, 2021	0.63
Other segment: 2021 Summer Olympics; Guest: George Clooney
226	17	Health care sharing ministries	June 27, 2021	0.56
Other segment: For the People Act, Italygate conspiracy theory Guest: Rachel Dratch
227	18	Housing discrimination in the United States	July 25, 2021	0.43
Other segments: Reparations Agreement between Israel and the Federal Republic of Germany, 2021 Summer Olympics, COVID-19 Delta variant Guest: H. Jon Benjamin (voice-over)
228	19	Emergency medical services	August 1, 2021	0.51
Other segment: Afghan interpreters Guest: George Clooney, Kermit the Frog, H. Jon Benjamin (voice-over)
229	20	Sackler family ("Opioids III")	August 8, 2021	0.56
Other segments: Andrew Cuomo sexual harassment allegations, Russian Olympic Committee; Guest: Richard Kind, H. Jon Benjamin (voice-over)
230	21	Ransomware	August 15, 2021	0.55
Other segment: Impact of the COVID-19 pandemic on education Guest: H. Jon Benjamin (voice-over), J. K. Simmons (voice-over)
231	22	Afghanistan troops withdrawal and 2021 Taliban offensive	August 22, 2021	0.60
Other segment: Jim "The Texas Hammer" Adler vs. Mike "The Alabama Hammer" Slocumb; Guest: H. Jon Benjamin (voice-over) Note: This was the last episode filmed at John Oliver's home.
232	23	Alexander Lukashenko	September 12, 2021	0.60
Other segment: Texas Heartbeat Act
233	24	Voting rights in the United States	September 26, 2021	0.59
Other segments: Haitian deportation in the United States, Federal Duck Stamps
234	25	Per- and polyfluoroalkyl substances	October 3, 2021	0.42
Guest: Danny DeVito
235	26	Misinformation among diasporas	October 10, 2021	0.42
Other segments: Janice McGeachin, One America News Network–AT&T controversial deal
236	27	Political status of Taiwan and Taiwan–United States relations	October 24, 2021	0.55
Other segment: Police resignations due to COVID-19 related precautions
237	28	Homelessness in the United States	October 31, 2021	0.43
Other segment: Build Back Better Act; Guest: George Clooney
238	29	The modern American power grid and the Unified Smart Grid	November 7, 2021	0.47
Discussion of the Rural Electrification Administration; Other segments: Edward Durr, COP26.
239	30	Union busting	November 14, 2021	0.56
Other segments: 2021 United States Capitol attack, John summoning celebrities Guests: H. Jon Benjamin (voice-over), George Clooney, Jennifer Coolidge, Will Ferrell, RuPaul, Cardi B, Brian Baumgartner, Leslie Jones

=== Season 9 (2022) ===
No. overall	No. in season	Main segment	Original release date	U.S. viewers (millions)
240	1	Critical race theory	February 20, 2022	0.59
Other segment: Canada convoy protest
241	2	Decriminalization of sex work	February 27, 2022	0.48
Discussion of Fight Online Sex Trafficking Act (FOSTA) and Backpage; Other segment: 2022 Russian invasion of Ukraine
242	3	Wrongful convictions	March 6, 2022	0.58
Discussion of the Antiterrorism and Effective Death Penalty Act of 1996; Other segment: 2022 Russian invasion of Ukraine
243	4	Ticket resale and scalping	March 13, 2022	0.66
Other segment: Florida Parental Rights in Education Act
244	5	Fentanyl and harm reduction of recreational drug use	March 27, 2022	0.46
Other segments: Kate & William's Royal Tour 2022, Nenana Ice Classic; Guest: Chris Parnell (voice-over)
245	6	Trucking industry in the United States	April 3, 2022	0.47
Discussion of the Motor Carrier Act of 1980; Other segment: Madison Cawthorn; Guests: Rob Corddry, Christopher McDonald, Rob Riggle (voice-over)
246	7	Data brokers	April 10, 2022	0.49
Other segments: 2022 Russian invasion of Ukraine, DirecTV drops OAN
247	8	Police interrogations and false confessions	April 17, 2022	0.66
Other segment: Dr. Oz's U.S. Senate campaign Guests: Tim Meadows, Michael Torpey, Connor Ratliff, Alexandra Dickson, Matt Pavich
248	9	Environmental racism	May 1, 2022	0.57
Other segments: Ron DeSantis, Greg Abbott, Alex Villanueva
249	10	Leaked draft opinion of Dobbs v. Jackson Women's Health Organization and 2022 Philippine presidential election	May 8, 2022	0.56
250	11	Electric utilities	May 15, 2022	0.52
Other segments: Alabama Vulnerable Child Compassion and Protection Act, Eurovision Song Contest 2022; Guest: Jennifer Barnhart as Reddy Kilowatt
251	12	Subway advertising practices and franchise operations	May 22, 2022	0.45
Other segment: 2022 Pennsylvania gubernatorial election (primary)
252	13	School resource officers and school shootings	June 5, 2022	0.46
Other segments: Platinum Jubilee of Elizabeth II; vandalism of Fallen Fruit statue in the City of Yarra
253	14	Big Tech monopolies	June 12, 2022	0.42
Other segment: 2022 United States Senate election in Arizona (primary)
254	15	Rental housing in the United States	June 19, 2022	0.51
Other segments: United States House Select Committee on the January 6 Attack public hearings, 2022 United States secretary of state elections
255	16	Colorado River Compact and aridification of the Western U.S.	June 26, 2022	0.46
Other segment: Dobbs v. Jackson Women's Health Organization; Guest: Brian Cox as God
256	17	2021–2022 inflation surge	July 24, 2022	0.47
Other segment: Updates on "Beach Dolls" web exclusive released on July 3 and Fallen Fruit statue in the City of Yarra, Australia
257	18	Mental health care in the United States	July 31, 2022	0.45
Other segment: Candidates for Britain's new prime minister
258	19	2022 monkeypox outbreak	August 7, 2022	0.57
Other segment: Trial of Alex Jones
259	20	2022 in Afghanistan, treatment of women by the Taliban, and U.S. sanctions' role in the humanitarian crisis	August 14, 2022	0.55
Other segments: FBI search of Mar-a-Lago, AI-generated art on Midjourney; Guest: Steve Buscemi as wedding officiant
260	21	Carbon offsets	August 21, 2022	0.62
Other segment: 2022 Alaska's at-large congressional district special election
261	22	Impact of the Law & Order franchise on the criminal justice system	September 11, 2022	0.56
Other segments: Death of Queen Elizabeth II, ministry of Liz Truss
262	23	Presidency of Jair Bolsonaro and the 2022 Brazilian general election	September 25, 2022	0.52
Other segments: Martha's Vineyard migrant airlift, Hurricane Fiona in Puerto Rico
263	24	Cultural repatriation of looted artifacts and the antiquities trade	October 2, 2022	0.48
Other segment: September 2022 United Kingdom mini-budget Guest: Kumail Nanjiani as museum curator
264	25	Crime reporting in the American news media	October 9, 2022	0.49
Othersegment: Mahsa Amini protests in Iran
265	26	Rights in the US concerning transgender youth ("Transgender Rights II")	October 16, 2022	0.50
Other segment: Latest developments in the Russian invasion of Ukraine and aftermath of the 2022 Crimean Bridge explosion
266	27	Bail reform in the United States ("Bail II")	October 30, 2022	0.45
Other segment: October 2022 United Kingdom government crisis and premiership of Rishi Sunak
267	28	Election conspiracy theories and attempts to overturn the 2020 and 2022 United States elections	November 6, 2022	0.38
Other segment: Acquisition of Twitter by Elon Musk; Guest: Nick Offerman (as a parody of Mike Collins)
268	29	Monarchy of the United Kingdom, its finances, and the royal family's role in British colonialism	November 13, 2022	0.45
Other segment: Results of the 2022 United States elections
269	30	2022 FIFA World Cup controversies ("FIFA III")	November 20, 2022	0.39
Other segments: Acquisition of Twitter by Elon Musk, update on AI-generated art on Midjourney

=== Season 10 (2023) ===
The show went on hiatus during the 2023 Writers Guild of America strike between May and September. As a result, only 21 episodes were produced in this season, rather than the 30 shows produced in the previous seven seasons, with production extending into the month of December, a month in which the show had previously gone dark.

No. overall	No. in season	Main segment	Original release date	U.S. viewers (millions)
270	1	Psychedelic therapy	February 19, 2023	0.48
Other segments: Dominion Voting Systems v. Fox News Network, 2023 Ohio train derailment
271	2	Artificial intelligence	February 26, 2023	0.52
Other segment: Dismissal of James O'Keefe from Project Veritas
272	3	Governorship of Ron DeSantis	March 5, 2023	0.51
Other segment: Movie parody advertisements of Radiant Plumbing in Austin, Texas
273	4	Temporary Assistance for Needy Families, welfare fraud, and Mississippi's scandals	March 12, 2023	0.34
Other segments: Tennessee Adult Entertainment Act and Tennessee lieutenant governor Randy McNally Instagram controversy, Dominion Voting Systems v. Fox News Network
274	5	Timeshares	March 19, 2023	0.38
Other segment: 2023 banking crisis Guest: Rachel Dratch as Wanda Jo Oliver
275	6	Solitary confinement in the United States	April 2, 2023	0.47
Other segments: 2023 French pension reform unrest, Winnie-the-Pooh: Blood and Honey and upcoming expiration of Disney's Steamboat Willie copyright
276	7	Homeowner associations (HOAs)	April 9, 2023	0.48
Other segment: 2023 Tennessee House of Representatives expulsions Guest: Chris Parnell as HOA ambassador
277	8	Farmworkers in the United States	April 16, 2023	0.50
Other segment: Medical abortion in the United States; Guest: Nick Offerman as Farming Simulator 2023 parody trailer announcer
278	9	2021–2023 cryptocurrency crash (effects on Terra-Luna, FTX, and Celsius Network)	April 23, 2023	0.46
Other segments: Resignation of Scotty Campbell, Bud Light boycott
279	10	Immigration policy of the Joe Biden administration and the Mexico–United States border crisis	April 30, 2023	0.46
Other segments: Coronation of Charles III and Camilla, world premiere of Radiant Plumbing's "Magtoiletolia" commercial
280	11	Prison healthcare in the United States	October 1, 2023	0.32
Other segment: A recap of events from the previous five months
281	12	Homeschooling in the United States	October 8, 2023	0.33
Other segments: 2023 Franklin, Tennessee, mayoral election; removal of Kevin McCarthy as Speaker of the U.S. House of Representatives
282	13	Food safety in the United States	October 15, 2023	0.40
Other segments: Gaza war, October 2023 Speaker of the U.S. House of Representatives election
283	14	McKinsey & Company	October 22, 2023	0.36
Other segments: October 2023 Speaker of the U.S. House of Representatives election, Bob Menendez corruption case Guests: Matt Barats, Ronny Chieng, Desi Domo, Vin Knight, Freddie Kuguru, Marla Mindelle, and Michael Torpey as McKinsey employees
284	15	Child labour in cocoa production, especially Ghanaian and Ivorian production	October 29, 2023	0.42
Other segments: 2023 Argentine presidential election, election of Mike Johnson as Speaker of the U.S. House of Representatives; Guest: Conan O'Brien
285	16	Abortion rights in the 2023 United States elections	November 5, 2023	0.39
Other segment: 2023 New Zealand Bird of the Year election
286	17	Gaza war	November 12, 2023	0.50
Other segment: Update to 2023 New Zealand Bird of the Year election
287	18	Dollar stores	November 19, 2023	0.46
Other segments: Results of the 2023 New Zealand Bird of the Year election, controversies in the 118th United States Congress
288	19	Organ donation and full body donation in the United States	December 3, 2023	0.42
Other segments: Expulsion of George Santos from the U.S. House of Representatives, death of Henry Kissinger
289	20	Freight railroads in the United States	December 10, 2023	0.36
Other segment: Mike Johnson; Guest: Matt Berry as The Sad Tale of Henry the Engine narrator
290	21	Elon Musk and his leadership of Tesla, SpaceX and Twitter	December 17, 2023	0.41
Other segments: Recap of season 10 and un-aired stories this season, Freeman and Moss vs Giuliani judgment

=== Season 11 (2024) ===
No. overall	No. in season	Main segment	Original release date	U.S. viewers (millions)
291	1	U.S. Supreme Court corruption (especially involving Clarence Thomas)	February 18, 2024	0.50
Other segment: Recap of major news stories from the last two months
292	2	Pig butchering scams	February 25, 2024	0.40
Other segments: LePage v. Center for Reproductive Medicine, discussion of the Comstock laws and modern day book burning
293	3	Boeing controversies (mainly 787 quality control issues and 737 MAX groundings)	March 3, 2024	0.45
Other segments: Trump presidential immunity case goes to the U.S. Supreme Court, Mitch McConnell steps down as head of the Senate Republican Conference; Guests: Rose Byrne as a Boeing executive; David Costabile, Adam Pally and Roy Wood Jr. as Boeing employees
294	4	State medical boards and their role in regulating medical malpractice	March 10, 2024	0.42
Other segments: Donald Trump endorses Mark Robinson in the 2024 North Carolina gubernatorial election, Vice President Kamala Harris calls for a temporary ceasefire in the Gaza war
295	5	Student loans in the United States	March 17, 2024	0.45
Other segments: U.S. House of Representatives passes the Protecting Americans from Foreign Adversary Controlled Applications Act ("TikTok ban"), divisions in the U.S. House Republican Conference; Guest: Snooki
296	6	Food delivery apps	March 31, 2024	0.41
Other segments: Trump Media & Technology Group goes public after losing US$58 million in 2023, Lego head mugshots released by the Murrieta, California police department
297	7	Capital punishment in the United States via lethal injections and nitrogen hypoxia	April 7, 2024	0.45
Other segment: Stock photography Guest: Ilgar Pashayev, an Azerbaijani individual who has appeared in over 25,000 stock photos
298	8	Medicaid	April 14, 2024	0.32
Other segments: Planned Parenthood Arizona v. Mayes, Seoul Broadcasting System's coverage of the 2024 South Korean legislative election. Guests: Amber Ruffin and Jabari Striblin, along with voice appearances by Mark McKinney, Fred Armisen, Nick Kroll, Cecily Strong, Eugene Mirman and Ryan Barger. All appear in a parody of a public service announcement that had aired in Georgia. Note: Almost a year after the broadcast of this episode, former medical director of AmeriHealth Caritas, Dr. Brian Morley, sued John Oliver and his production company, Partially Important Productions, claiming defamation for "knowingly manipulat[ing] the context" under which Dr. Morley's testimony was presented in the episode. The case was dismissed by federal judge Ronnie Abrams in June 2026.
299	9	Investigation of UFO reports by the United States government	April 21, 2024	0.37
Other segments: Gaza war protests in the United States, Islamophobia in the confirmation hearings of Adeel Mangi
300	10	Book banning at public libraries in the United States	May 5, 2024	0.30
Other segment: 2024 pro-Palestinian protests on university campuses (specifically at Columbia and UCLA)
301	11	Settlements for the U.S. opioid epidemic ("Opioids IV")	May 12, 2024	0.37
Other segments: Eurovision Song Contest 2024, Safety of Rwanda (Asylum and Immigration) Act 2024
302	12	Corn production in the United States	May 19, 2024	0.33
Other segment: Rise of the Alternative for Germany party
303	13	2024 Indian general election and premiership of Narendra Modi	June 2, 2024	0.39
Other segments: Trump found guilty in hush money trial, Bankruptcy of Red Lobster/John buys a former Red Lobster building
304	14	Deep sea mining in the Clarion–Clipperton zone	June 9, 2024	0.40
Other segments: Concerns and controversies at the 2024 Summer Olympics, update on Red Lobster story (a local bakery wants equipment in John's Red Lobster building)
305	15	Project 2025, Schedule F appointments under a second Trump administration	June 16, 2024	TBD
Other segments: A candidate for Michigan's 8th Congressional District election using AI to replicate Martin Luther King Jr.'s voice; John donates equipment to a local bakery in exchange for it selling cupcakes with his face on them.
306	16	2024 UK general election and history of the UK Conservative Party since 2010	June 23, 2024	TBD
Other segments: Louisiana mandates displaying the Ten Commandments in public schools, efforts by other states to ban pride flags and Samuel Alito flag display controversy.
307	17	2024 Republican National Convention and myths about U.S. immigration and crime	July 21, 2024	0.46
Other segments: 2024 Bolivian coup attempt, 2025 World Games
308	18	Israeli occupation, settlement and laws in the West Bank	July 28, 2024	0.37
Other segment: Kamala Harris and JD Vance enter the presidential race.
309	19	Robert F. Kennedy Jr. and his 2024 presidential campaign	August 4, 2024	0.41
Other segments: Trump questions Harris's racial identity at the 2024 National Association of Black Journalists Convention and Career Fair, controversies at the 2024 Summer Olympics.
310	20	History of Hawaii, how it became a US territory, and the plight of Native Hawaiians	August 11, 2024	0.33
Other segments: Arisa Trew's gold medal in women's park skateboarding, 2024 United States presidential election
311	21	Malpractice and fraud by providers of hospice care in the United States	August 18, 2024	0.40
Other segments: 2024 United States presidential election, Senate campaigns of Royce White, Hung Cao, and Eric Hovde
312	22	The U.S. National School Lunch Program	September 8, 2024	0.34
Other segments: 2024 Venezuelan political crisis, a contest in Michigan in which children designed "I Voted" stickers, 2024 United States presidential election
313	23	Supplemental Security Income and Social Security Disability Insurance	September 22, 2024	N/A
Other segment: Springfield pet-eating hoax
314	24	Influence of conservative groups on the U.S. federal judiciary	September 29, 2024	N/A
Other segment: Indictment of Eric Adams
315	25	Traffic stops in the United States	October 6, 2024	N/A
Other segments: October 2024 Iranian strikes against Israel, Lance Wallnau's Courage Tour, 2024 United States vice presidential debate, new case filing in Jack Smith's 2020 U.S. presidential election interference investigation
316	26	Subversion in the 2024 United States presidential election	October 13, 2024	N/A
Other segment: Hurricane Milton, Waffle House's secret order codes and the Waffle House Index; Guest: Hannah Crane as a Waffle House waitress
317	27	Mass deportation within Trump's immigration policy and "God Bless the U.S.A."	October 27, 2024	N/A
Other segment: 2024 McDonald's E. coli outbreak Guest: Will Ferrell as a patriotic singer
318	28	Business career of Donald Trump	November 3, 2024	N/A
Other segment: 2024 United States presidential election
319	29	2024 U.S. presidential election results and forecasting Trump's second presidency	November 10, 2024	N/A
320	30	TikTok, potential ban in the U.S. and the legislation enabling it	November 17, 2024	N/A
Other segment: Donald Trump nominates Matt Gaetz as Attorney General, recap of season 11

=== Season 12 (2025) ===
No. overall	No. in season	Main segment	Original release date	U.S. viewers (millions)
321	1	DOGE and Elon Musk's influence on Trump's presidency	February 16, 2025	0.255
Other segment: Recap of major news stories from the previous two months
322	2	Online content moderation, particularly for Facebook	February 23, 2025	N/A
Other segments: 2025 United States federal mass layoffs and DOGE budget savings underperformance Guests: Cecily Strong, Ronny Chieng, Peter Grosz, Tarik Davis
323	3	Tipping	March 2, 2025	0.317
Other segments: The Silicon Valley Auto Show, 2025 Trump–Zelenskyy meeting, Kash Patel and Dan Bongino's leadership at the FBI
324	4	U.S. Immigration and Customs Enforcement detention centers	March 9, 2025	N/A
Other segments: 2025 Donald Trump speech to a joint session of Congress, town hall meetings with members of the 119th United States Congress, and the Trump tariffs
325	5	Sports betting in the United States	March 16, 2025	N/A
Other segment: Detention of Mahmoud Khalil; Guests: Ben Schwartz, Adam Pally, Bobby Moynihan, Casey Wilson, Jacquis Neal
326	6	Axon Enterprise, use of tasers by police in America, and excited delirium	March 30, 2025	N/A
Other segments: Signalgate, theft of a Paddington Bear statue, and 2025 Turkish protests
327	7	Discrimination against trans women in sports in the United States	April 6, 2025	N/A
Other segment: The Trump tariffs
328	8	Tariffs in the second Trump administration	April 13, 2025	0.314
Other segments: Fish doorbell, Linda McMahon mis-abbreviating artificial intelligence as "A1" instead of AI; Guest: Mario (performing a song written for the Fish doorbell segment)
329	9	Robert F. Kennedy Jr. and cuts made to the Department of Health and Human Services	April 27, 2025	N/A
Other segment: Death and funeral of Pope Francis and a possible papacy of Pierbattista Pizzaballa
330	10	Immigrants and deportations under Trump	May 4, 2025	0.322
Other segments: 2025 Canadian federal election, Minor League Baseball team names
331	11	Alliance Defending Freedom	May 11, 2025	0.318
Other segments: 2025 papal conclave, tariffs in the second Trump administration, John Kruk's color commentary
332	12	Freedom of the press under the second Trump administration	May 18, 2025	N/A
Other segments: Eurovision Song Contest 2025, HBO Max rebranding, followup to the Minor League Baseball rebranding contest from Episode 330
333	13	Air traffic control in the United States	June 1, 2025	0.277
Other segment: Use of pardons by President Trump; Guests: Lauren Adams, H. Jon Benjamin, Lil Rel Howery, and Keyla Monterroso Mejia as air traffic controllers
334	14	Med spas	June 8, 2025	0.279
Other segments: TV coverage of the 2025 South Korean presidential election, Trump–Musk feud, Dominion Voting Systems' civil lawsuit against Mike Lindell, and Stephen Baldwin's one-man film Heaven, How I Got Here: The Story of the Thief on the Cross; Guest: Rachel Dratch as Wanda Jo Oliver
335	15	Juvenile courts and youth incarceration in the United States	June 15, 2025	0.241
Other segments: Ed (an escaped zebra who was returned to his owners via helicopter after his capture) and the June 2025 Los Angeles protests
336	16	AI slop	June 22, 2025	N/A
Other segment: Twelve-Day War; Guest: Michael Jones, British woodcarver and content creator
337	17	The One Big Beautiful Bill Act	June 29, 2025	N/A
Other segments: 2025 New York City Democratic mayoral primary; second followup to the Minor League Baseball rebranding contest from Episode 330 Guest: Bob Costas (voice-over)
338	18	Gang databases	July 27, 2025	N/A
Other segments: The relationship between Donald Trump and Jeffrey Epstein and the Jeffrey Epstein client list, and the debut game of the Erie Moon Mammoths (the third followup to the Minor League Baseball rebranding contest from Episode 330) Guests: L.V., Bob Costas (voice-over), and people associated with Erie, Pennsylvania, or its Minor League Baseball team, including Laina Banic (director of fan engagement for the team), Gregg Coleman (team president), George Moon (amateur scuba diver), John Oliver (president of the Erie tourist association); Note: In addition to appearing as a guest, L.V. was also profiled in the main segment.
339	19	Deferred prosecution agreements	August 3, 2025	0.315
Other segments: Product recall of the High Noon seltzer, Gaza Strip famine
340	20	Changes to ICE and related agencies' conduct during Trump's second term	August 10, 2025	0.339
Other segments: Donald Trump's tour of the roof of the White House, Chuck Schumer's use of a persona couple (which he named "the Baileys") to make points about public policy Guests: Bobby Moynihan and Edi Patterson (as Mr. and Mrs. Bailey)
341	21	Make America Healthy Again, wellness influencer marketing, and Casey Means	August 17, 2025	0.322
Other segments: 2025 Russia–United States Summit, Trump's federal takeover of DC police
342	22	Tertiary education policy of the second Trump administration	September 7, 2025	0.247
Other segments: 2025 China Victory Day Parade, the State of Florida dropping mandatory vaccinations for public school students
343	23	Suspension of Jimmy Kimmel Live!	September 21, 2025	0.338
Other segments: 2025 state visit by Donald Trump to the United Kingdom, Bernd das Brot Guest: H. Jon Benjamin (voice-over)
344	24	Benjamin Netanyahu	September 28, 2025	N/A
Other segments: 2025 Donald Trump speech at the United Nations, indictment of James Comey
345	25	The U.S. Presidential library system	October 5, 2025	N/A
Other segments: Russell Vought's role in the 2025 United States federal government shutdown, Pete Hegseth summons 800 generals to Quantico, and ICE raid incidents in Chicago
346	26	Bari Weiss, David Ellison, and CBS News	October 12, 2025	N/A
Other segment: October 2025 Gaza war ceasefire
347	27	Medicare Advantage	October 26, 2025	N/A
Other segments: Trump's commutation of George Santos's prison sentence, Trump's demolition of the White House East Wing, and extrajudicial executions in the Caribbean; Guests: Nick Offerman and Megan Mullally (a real-life couple, playing a couple in a mock ad – the mock ad contained an actual phone number featuring an outgoing voicemail message by Offerman)
348	28	Police chases in the United States	November 2, 2025	N/A
Other segments: Effects of the 2025 United States federal government shutdown, the wine industry with a focus on a Canadian brand named after the early 20th century premier of British Columbia John Oliver (Note: As part of the segment, the show announced a new brand of wine, "Cabernet SauvignJohn" (a spoof on Cabernet Sauvignon), which it sold on a limited basis on website CabernetSauvignJohn.com. The brand was priced at a loss and sold out within less than a day. $50,000 from proceeds of the sales were donated to sixteen food banks across California.)
349	29	Felony murder in the United States	November 9, 2025	N/A
Other segments: 2025 New York City mayoral election, mayoralty of Eric Adams
350	30	Public broadcasting in the United States	November 16, 2025	N/A
Other segments: Failure during the unveiling of the Russian humanoid robot named AIdol, and the release of additional Epstein files Guest: Joel McHale as host of a telethon for auctioning off memorabilia from previous episodes of the show (Note: Presented as part of the main segment. The slightly over $1.5 million raised in the auction, held online at johnoliversjunk.com, went towards public media.)

=== Season 13 (2026) ===
No. overall	No. in season	Main segment	Original release date	U.S. viewers (millions)
351	1	History of DHS, Operation Metro Surge and Minnesota protests	February 15, 2026	N/A
Other segment: Biathlon at the 2026 Winter Olympics
352	2	Twitter under Elon Musk	February 22, 2026	N/A
Other segment: Arrest of Andrew Mountbatten-Windsor
353	3	Police body cameras in the United States	March 1, 2026	N/A
Other segment: Kash Patel
354	4	Global impacts of defunding USAID	March 8, 2026	N/A
Other segments: 2026 Iran war, soap operas Guest: Jack McBrayer as Colonel Sanders
355	5	JD Vance	March 15, 2026	N/A
Other segment: 2026 Iran war
356	6	Police stings in the United States	March 22, 2026	N/A
Other segments: 2026 Iran war
357	7	Viktor Orbán and the 2026 Hungarian parliamentary election	March 29, 2026	N/A
Other segments: 2026 Iran war, National Park Service's 2026 America the Beautiful Pass
358	8	Prediction markets	April 19, 2026	N/A
Other segment: Pope Leo XIV's comments on the Iran War
359	9	AI chatbots	April 26, 2026	N/A
Other segments: 2026 Iran war, Kash Patel, the week's Senate hearings of Robert F. Kennedy Jr. and Kevin Warsh
360	10	Regulation of gas station over-the-counter drugs in the United States	May 3, 2026	N/A
Other segments: 2026 White House Correspondents' Dinner shooting, Supreme Court decision in Louisiana v. Callais and potential impact on U.S. voting rights
361	11	Shadow docket of the Supreme Court	May 10, 2026	N/A
Other segments: 2026 Iran war, use of dolphins by the military and The Day of the Dolphin
362	12	Structured settlements, factoring companies, and J.G. Wentworth	May 17, 2026	N/A
Other segment: The White House State Ballroom Guests: James Monroe Iglehart, Megan Hilty, and 16 other theater singers as Vikings, Alex Moffat as an office worker, and Victor Garber as a pit conductor, in a parody of a J.G. Wentworth commercial; Larry David
363	13	Presidential pardons under Donald Trump	May 31, 2026	N/A
Other segments: Freedom 250; Ghanaian film posters
364	14	New College of Florida and 2023 conservative takeover under Ron DeSantis	June 7, 2026	N/A
Other segment: 2026 Colorado gubernatorial election primaries
365	15	Premiership of Keir Starmer, Labour Party leadership contest and 2026 Makerfield by-election	June 14, 2026	N/A
Other segments: 2026 Iran war, 2026 FIFA World Cup, removal of Donald Trump's name from the Kennedy Center
366	16	Feral pigs in the United States	June 21, 2026	N/A
Other segments: Iran peace deal, 2026 FIFA World Cup, Lincoln Memorial Reflecting Pool, Barack Obama Presidential Center, 2026 Makerfield by-election Guests: Mike Carlsen, Russell Daniels, Abra Tabak, and many extras as hog hunters
367	17	2025–2026 United States redistricting	June 28, 2026	N/A
Other segments: Lincoln Memorial Reflecting Pool, announcement of John's upcoming appearances on Days of Our Lives and General Hospital
368	18	Cryptocurrency in the second Trump presidency	July 26, 2026	N/A
Other segment: Buc-ee's and lawsuits regarding intellectual property of cartoon mascot Buc-ee
369	19	Police surveillance technology in the United States	August 2, 2026	N/A
Other segment: 2026 cyclosporiasis outbreak
370	20	U.S. Department of Justice and its politicization under Trump	August 9, 2026	N/A
Other segment: Updates on the intellectual property of cartoon mascot Buc-ee
371	21	Fetal personhood laws and their effects	August 16, 2026	N/A
Other segments: Trump's use of Air Force One after the 2026 Ankara NATO summit, John's appearances on soap operas
372	22	Subscription business models	August 23, 2026	N/A
Other segments: Sean Duffy, the Department of Transportation and The Great American Road Trip
373	23	UnitedHealth Group	September 20, 2026	N/A
Other segment: Kash Patel and FBI hiring practices
374	24	2026 Brazilian general election	September 27, 2026	N/A
Other segment: Ken Paxton and 2026 United States Senate election in Texas
375	25	United States Secret Service	October 4, 2026	N/A
Other segments: Mike Tomlin's creations in Minecraft, 2026 United States elections Guests: Jon Hamm (voice-over); Eugene Cordero, Rob Riggle, Courtney Taylor, Anders Holm and Adam Devine as Secret Service agents; Mark Proksch as would-be assassin; Vic Michaelis as liquor store clerk and Mike Mitchell as rally attendee
376	26	Generic drug shortages and quality control	October 11, 2026	N/A
Other segments: Kimberly Guilfoyle's credit issues, Liberty Mutual and Kiwibank's new advertising mascots
377	27	Right-wing extremism in the United States	October 25, 2026	TBD
Other segment: President Trump's recent stump speech in South Carolina
378	28	2026 United States midterm elections	November 1, 2026	TBD
Other segments: History of the US $100 bill and large-note currency, the Buffalo Bills' social media outreach
379	29	Pete Hegseth as Secretary of Defense	November 8, 2026	TBD
Other segment: 2026 United States elections results
380	30	"Alligator Alcatraz"	November 15, 2026	TBD
Other segments: 2026 FAA nationwide ground stop, Stephen Miller's appointment to White House Chief of Staff, Jensen Huang scandal, recap of the season

=== Web exclusives ===
No.	Main segment	Original release date
1	President Obama Meets a Robot	April 27, 2014
2	Simon Ostrovsky Interview	May 4, 2014
3	Letter of the Week: POM Wonderful	May 4, 2014
4	Fareed Zakaria Interview Part 2	May 18, 2014
5	Last Week's News... We Think	May 25, 2014
6	Pepe Julian Onziema Part 2	June 29, 2014
7	Fireworks	July 6, 2014
8	#WeGotThoseGeckos	August 3, 2014
9	John Oliver Literally Destroys Piñatas	August 24, 2014
10	Fan Mail Vol. 1	August 31, 2014
11	Cookie Monster's Ideas	September 2, 2014
12	Roger Goodell	September 22, 2014
13	Pumpkin Spice	October 12, 2014
14	Real Animals, Fake Paws	October 19, 2014
15	1,000,000 YouTube Subscribers	November 2, 2014
16	Turkey pardoning	November 23, 2014
17	New Year's Eve	December 29, 2014
18	Fifty Shades #NotMyChristian Apology	January 25, 2015
19	April Fool's Day	March 29, 2015
20	Edward Snowden on Passwords	April 9, 2015
21	Lost Graphics	May 25, 2015
22	Shallow Dives	July 5, 2015
23	History Lies	August 30, 2015
24	Back to School	September 6, 2015
25	Regifting	December 12, 2015
26	Revised Resolutions	January 4, 2016
27	Lost Graphics Vol. 2	January 24, 2016
28	Conspiracies	March 27, 2016
29	Cicadas	May 1, 2016
30	How Is This Not a Thing?	May 29, 2016
31	Independence Day	July 3, 2016
32	Fan Mail Vol. 2	July 10, 2016
33	Endorsements	July 17, 2016
34	Johnny Strong	August 28, 2016
35	Labor Day	September 4, 2016
36	Birds	September 12, 2016
37	Dancing Zebra Footage	March 19, 2017
38	Net Neutrality Update	May 14, 2017
39	Lost Graphics Vol. 3	July 15, 2018
40	Retractions	August 26, 2018
41	SantaCon	December 8, 2019
42	Push Notifications	January 19, 2020
43	Pringles Update	December 6, 2020
44	Lost Graphics Vol. 4	April 25, 2021
45	Cereal	May 30, 2021
46	Octopuses	July 11, 2021
47	John Dillermand	July 21, 2021
48	Local Car Commercials	October 17, 2021
49	Snack Video Games	December 5, 2021
50	The Da Vinci Code	January 9, 2022
51	Air Bud	April 24, 2022
52	Rocks (Kandiss Taylor and the Georgia Guidestones)	May 29, 2022
53	Beach Dolls	July 3, 2022
54	Trash (featuring Nina Persson)	December 19, 2022
55	A History of Chuck E. Cheese	April 9, 2023
56	Mike Lindell & MyStore	August 24, 2025
57	Air Bud Part 2	October 19, 2025
58	Air Bud Part 3	November 23, 2025
