= Fish doorbell =

Crowdsourced fish ladder in the Netherlands

A fish doorbell (Dutch: visdeurbel) is a system that allows fish to pass through a closed sluice gate through crowdsourced input when fish are present. The Utrecht Visdeurbel uses a livestreamed underwater camera that allows users to press a doorbell button to notify the lock operator that there are fish swimming in the gracht, and that the lock should be opened.

In practice, the doorbell button saves a screenshot in a municipal database. This is checked by ecological experts who then make a plan of when the lock will be opened. Since this planning is made a week in advance, website visitors cannot directly control the opening of the lock.

It is designed to aid in seasonal fish migration, as an alternative to a physical fish ladder. The purpose of the project is to increase the survival of local fish that are otherwise vulnerable to predation during migration. The doorbell does not solely benefit fish. Crabs, lobsters, frogs, and geese have been caught on the livestream.

== Usage ==
It was deployed for the first time in Utrecht in March 2021, at the Weerdsluis on the Oudegracht. In the first two weeks, it was used 23,000 times. It was disabled in June, but was reinstated at https://visdeurbel.nl. It ceased operation on July 1st, 2024 due to concluded migratory patterns and returned on March 3rd, 2025. It repeated this pattern the next year, with its next scheduled opening on March 2nd, 2026.

== Popular culture ==
The system was featured in Episode 8 of Season 12 the American news satire late-night talk show Last Week Tonight with John Oliver. On the show, R&B singer Mario makes a guest appearance and sings a song about the system.
