= Chiitan =

Japanese mascot

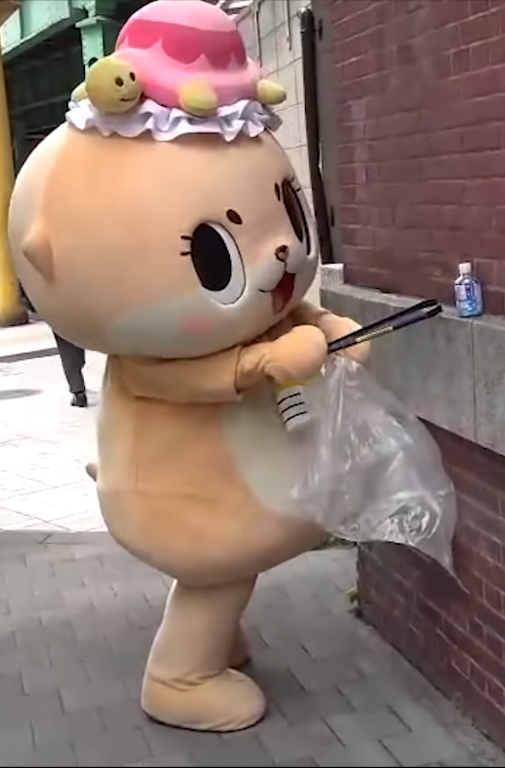
- Chiitan in 2018
- First appearance: December 15, 2017
- Created by: Koh Hashibiro
- Designed by: Koh Hashibiro

In-universe information
- Species: Fairy-baby otter

Chiitan (ちぃたん☆ [tɕiːꜜtaɴ]) is a Japanese mascot which was formerly a self-declared unofficial representative of the city of Susaki. It is a self-described "0-year-old fairy baby" otter that wears a turtle as a hat. The mascot was created in 2017 and participated in videos and events with government officials and Susaki's official city mascot, Shinjo-kun. Chiitan gained popularity through its unusual YouTube videos and social media posts in which it performed various clumsy or violent stunts. It became one of the most popular mascots in Japan in 2018, and currently has over 2 million followers on Twitter.

In January 2019, complaints about the controversial nature of Chiitan's videos and social media posts led Susaki officials to reject its association with the mascot. In addition to excluding the mascot from official events, the government of Susaki claimed that it held the copyright for Chiitan's likeness and threatened to sue the company responsible for managing Chiitan if it continued to produce media content with the character. In April 2019 the mascot was featured on an episode of HBO's Last Week Tonight with John Oliver. The episode praised Chiitan's antics but led its host, John Oliver, to create "Chiijohn", a replacement mascot-friend for Shinjo-kun. Following the episode, Chiitan challenged Oliver to a fight on Twitter for stealing its friend, shortly after which its Twitter accounts were suspended without warning. Several other media companies cancelled projects they had to collaborate with Chiitan in 2019, but it remains popular on other social media platforms.

== History ==
=== Creation ===
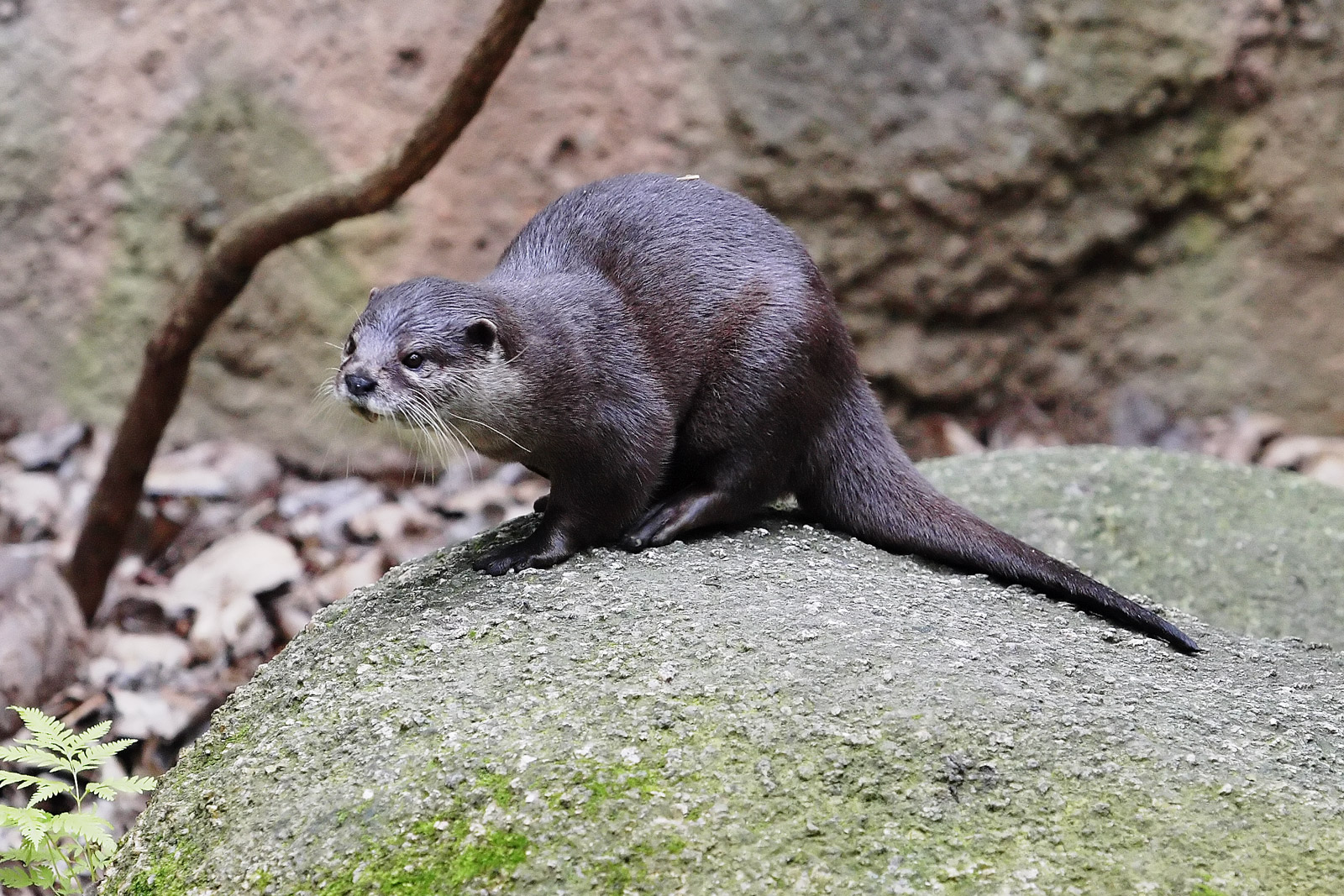
An Asian small-clawed otter

In 2013, the city of Susaki, Kochi Prefecture unveiled an official mascot called Shinjo-kun (しんじょう君), an extinct Japanese river otter wearing a nabeyaki (hot pot) ramen dish for a hat. The Shinjo River in Susaki is noted as the place of the last official sighting of the species in 1979. After its creation, Shinjo-kun competed and won Japan's annual competition for local mascots, the Yuru-chara Grand Prix, beating out 1,400 other mascot entrants.

In 2016, Susaki named a local Asian small-clawed otter "Chiitan" as its honorary tourism ambassador. The otter had gained popularity and had its own public access TV show. It was known for its curiosity and its "adorable squeaks that could melt even the coldest hearts".

In December 2017 a group of people from Chiitan, the otter's Tokyo-based production company, created a mascot for the otter, also named "Chiitan", in order to improve the otter's popularity. Chiitan's design was created by illustrator Koh Hashibiro (端広こう), the same designer of Shinjo-kun. The character has no gender, and wears the turtle "Kame-chan" as a hat. On its Twitter page Chiitan described itself as a "0-year-old fairy baby". Because of its association with both Chiitan the otter and Shinjo-kun, which were both formally associated with Susaki, Chiitan declared that it itself was also an unofficial "tourist ambassador" for the city.

=== Popularity ===
A video of Chiitan being silly

By July 2018 Chiitan's Japanese language Twitter account had 750,000 followers, and its English-language account had 535,000 followers. Chiitan's popularity continued to grow throughout the year, and by January 2019 it had 906,000 Twitter followers.

Much of the media produced by Chiitan was often chaotic and involved the mascot acting clumsy or violent. Occasionally its videos were criticized for being "creepy", "reckless", and "dangerous". Some of Chiitan's videos included it hitting a punching bag with a baseball bat, jumping into metal boxes, flipping a car, twirling a motorized weed cutter around its head, falling off a pogo stick, failing at bowling, and falling off a bike while trying to fire a bow and arrow. In one video, captioned "Chiitan is going to visit your house", the mascot takes a baseball bat from a locker, stuffs it into its costume, and walks offscreen. Chiitan was hired by Square Enix to promote its video game Just Cause 4 by performing and sharing several stunts based on action sequences from the game. These stunts involved the mascot flying into metal boxes, experiencing a wind tunnel, jumping across a gap with the aid of a grappling hook, and jumping from a height while using a number of umbrellas glued together to break its fall.

The Japan Times described Chiitan's antics as slapstick, similar in style and content to Jackass. Many of its videos ended up with it lying on the ground after attempting a dangerous physical stunt. Many of Chiitan's videos involved the use of athletic equipment that was sent to it by fans. One video, showing Chiitan kicking an exercise ball, was viewed over eight million times. Chiitan's videos were well-received by many people on the internet, resulting in it becoming "the fastest rising star" among Japanese mascots in 2018.

Some of the social media posts in which Chiitan and Shinjo-kun appeared together led some people to believe that Chiitan was a "bad influence" on Shinjo-kun. One post, in which Chiitan carries a miniature baseball bat and Shinjo-kun is dressed as a gangster, is captioned: "We're the bosses, don't mess with us or we'll commit otterocities."

In July 2021, Chiitan's Instagram page was more popular than the page of the 2020 Summer Olympics mascots Miraitowa and Someity, with Chiitan having 900,000 followers while the mascots for the Olympics had 15,000 followers.

Chiitan would later appear as a contestant in the 2023 Amazon Prime Video reboot of Takeshi's Castle.

=== Media reception ===
Chiitan's social media posts were controversial, and by January 2019 the government of Susaki had received over 100 complaints from citizens who objected to the city's association with the mascot. Many of the people who complained seem to have mistaken Chiitan with Susaki's official mascot, Shinjo-kun, who looks similar. These complaints led the city to suspend its ties with Chiitan that month. In addition to preventing its officials and official mascot from appearing with Chiitan, the city's mayor, Kosaku Kusunose, requested that Chiitan "suspend activities" in February, claiming that the mascot was guilty of violating a copyright on the character's image owned by the city and accusing the company managing the character of profiting off of it. In addition to distancing itself from the mascot Chiitan, the city government elected not to renew the real otter Chiitan's status as its honorary tourism ambassador. In spite of the city's request, Chiitan's management company continued to produce media for the character on its social media accounts, leading to the city filing a court case against it in February 2019.

After Susaki broke ties with Chiitan, other collaborators also ended their relationship with the character. TV Tokyo suspended the production of an anime it had been making based on the character's adventures, "Fairy Chiitan". SEGA Games cancelled plans that it had to produce an online game with the character.

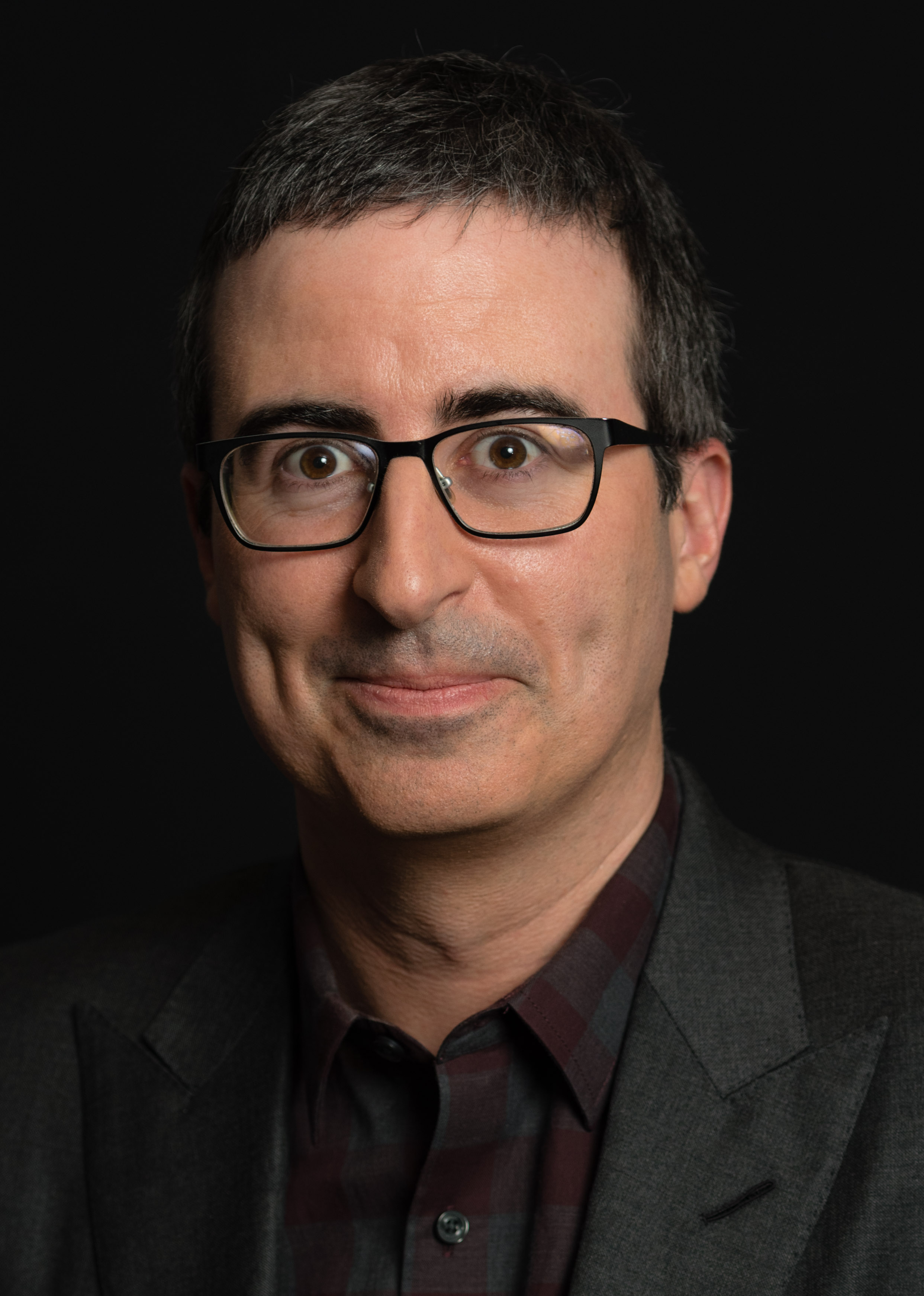
John Oliver

After losing its association with Susaki, Chiitan was the topic of an episode of John Oliver's HBO program, Last Week Tonight. In the episode John Oliver explained how the mascot came to be, and praised its strange and humorous videos as "amazing", "a work of art", and "virtuosic". Oliver then created and sent his own mascot, "Chiijohn", "a 41-year-old nearsighted English fairy baby", to Susaki in order to befriend Shinjo-kun. After a short video detailing the friendship between Shinjo-kun and Chiijohn, Oliver confirmed that Chiijohn had been officially accepted by the Susaki government.

Following the segment, Chiitan, via its official Twitter account, stated that it was angry that Oliver had stolen its friend and challenged Oliver to a fight. It tweeted WWE-inspired challenges directed at John Oliver, inviting him to fight it in a "NO HOLDS BARRED MATCH". In another tweet, Chiitan stated that it "wants to give John Oliver a chance to explode through a table", and later attempted to enlist Dwayne "The Rock" Johnson to help pressure Oliver. Oliver, in response to Chiitan's posts, tweeted "I'm in a public beef with an unsanctioned Japanese otter. I needed this."

On May 14, 2019, Twitter suspended Chiitan's Japanese, Korean, Portuguese, Arabic, and Turkish accounts. Chiitan's official English account made numerous posts begging for its other accounts to be re-opened. According to the staff responsible for managing Chiitan, they did not receive any warning or notice that Chiitan's accounts would be closed. Speculation about why the accounts may have been closed include the mascot's challenge to fight Oliver (which was intended to be humorous and was understood by Oliver to be so), or the attention brought to its previous posts after it was featured on Oliver's show.

By May 20, 2019, Chiitan's two English-language Twitter accounts were also frozen. Chiitan's team created two additional Twitter accounts, @HelpChiitan in English and @Chiitan7407 in Japanese, to lobby for Chiitan's other Twitter accounts to be unfrozen. Celebrities solicited for support included John Oliver and Tony Hawk. There was speculation that Oliver may have been responsible for Chiitan's suspension, but a spokesman for HBO said that Oliver's show had no comment on Chiitan's suspension.

In addition to the mascot Chiitan's Twitter accounts, the other Twitter accounts managed by Chiitan's management company were also frozen, including that of the real otter Chiitan. Chiitan's social media accounts on other platforms remained unaffected, including Instagram, where it has over 2 million followers.

Despite the claims of the company managing Chiitan that it produced only "healthy" content that was neither prejudicial nor malicious, others suggested that the "anarchic" nature of the mascot's videos was what led to its Twitter accounts' suspension. There was speculation that the suspension was related to the ongoing copyright dispute with the city of Susaki over the mascot's image, but a spokesman for the Susaki city government denied contacting Twitter. One "inside source" was reported to have said that Chiitan's accounts were banned because it had violated Twitter's rules on spam. Twitter refused to make a statement on the suspensions, saying it was company policy not to comment on private accounts due to security and privacy concerns. On June 5, 2020, Chiitan appeared in a video supporting the Black Lives Matter movement by donating ¥10,498 to the movement after the murder of George Floyd, which gained positive response. On December 2, 2024, Chiitan declared itself an ally of transgender people, causing backlash from various Twitter users. Alongside backlash, Chiitan also received positive response for its patience and understanding.
