= Stay Up Late =

1992 painting by Brian Swords

Brian Swords, Stay Up Late. 1992. Private collection of John Oliver

Stay Up Late is a 1992 erotic furry watercolor painting by Brian Swords. The work depicts two anthropomorphic white rats embracing on a bed. Between 1988 and 1993, Swords donated paintings to an annual art auction for WITF-TV, a public television station in central Pennsylvania. As the years went on, the artwork became more explicit, culminating in the station banning erotica in 1993.

It was originally sold in 1992 for $80 (equivalent to $180 in 2025) and gained prominence in 2020 when television host John Oliver purchased the painting on Last Week Tonight. Oliver used the work to comment on the American response to the COVID-19 pandemic. The stunt was praised by commentators. The next year, Stay Up Late was included in a five-city-tour put on by the show to support struggling museums.

== Background ==
Brian Swords, also known as Biohazard, is an American furry fandom artist from York, Pennsylvania. He cites "Omaha" the Cat Dancer and The Secret of NIMH as influences on his art. Swords is best known for painting a series of watercolors, including Stay Up Late, that depict a pair of anthropomorphic rats named Alice and Bob in sexually suggestive poses. Between 1988 and 1993, Swords donated his paintings to "Gallery 33", WITF-TV's yearly auction. His pieces sold well, but the donated paintings steadily became more explicit. In 1993, WITF-TV banned erotica from their yearly auction "Gallery 33" due to fear of alienating their audience and losing their FCC license.

== Description ==
Stay Up Late is a watercolor painting on paper measuring 24 by 18 inches (61 cm × 46 cm). It depicts two anthropomorphic white rats embracing on a bed. Behind them, on the headboard, sits a large bottle of K-Y Jelly and a used ashtray. British-American comedian John Oliver describes the work as "as if Monet has a furry period".

== Provenance ==
Stay Up Late was painted in 1992 by Brian Swords and sold to an unknown buyer for $80 (equivalent to $180 in 2025).

The painting appeared in the March 29, 2020 episode of Last Week Tonight when Oliver offered to buy it for $1,000 and make a $20,000 donation to a food bank. The painting was part of a stunt attempting to show how much easier it is to buy a particular painting from an unknown artist than it is to get tested for COVID-19 in the United States. Two weeks later, on April 12, 2020, Oliver was shown with the painting as part of his closing monologue of the episode. Emily Chambers, writing for politics blog Pajiba, referred to the extended joke as "the greatest story of the past century." Virginia Streva, in the Philly Voice, called the quest for the painting a "comedic victory."

Stay Up Late and two other works (a paint on plywood portrait of Wendy Williams eating a lamb chop by Michael Lee Scott and an oil on canvas painting of Larry Kudlow's neckties by Kudlow's wife Judith Pond Kudlow) took part in a tour of the United States from October 2021 to January 2022. The traveling exhibition was put on by Oliver to support museums impacted by the COVID-19 pandemic. The Judy Garland Museum, Museum of Broadcast Communications, American Visionary Art Museum, William V. Banks Broadcast Museum & Media Center and the Cartoon Art Museum showed the works for three weeks, received a $10,000 donation from Last Week Tonight, and a donation to a local food bank.
