= Russell Crowe's jockstrap =

Garment in the 2005 film Cinderella Man

- Cinderella Man element
- John Oliver revealing the jockstrap on Last Week Tonight
- First appearance: Cinderella Man; 2005

In-universe information
- Type: Jockstrap

Russell Crowe's jockstrap is a leather jockstrap that was part of a costume worn by actor Russell Crowe in the 2005 film Cinderella Man. In 2018, the jockstrap was auctioned off and was bought by comedian John Oliver, who in turn donated it to Alaska's last operating Blockbuster Video store. However, after the closure of the Blockbuster, the jockstrap eventually returned to John Oliver's possession.

== Original use and subsequent ownership ==
In Cinderella Man, New Zealand actor Russell Crowe played American boxer James J. Braddock, who was the world heavyweight champion from 1935 to 1937. In the film, Crowe wears the jockstrap in the scene in which Braddock wins the championship.

After the film was produced, Crowe took possession of various props from the film, including the jockstrap, and incorporated them into his collection of memorabilia.

== Sale and Blockbuster Video donation ==
In April 2018, Crowe auctioned off over 200 props he owned that were used by him in his various films in a "divorce auction" to celebrate his split from Danielle Spencer. He included the jockstrap as part of the auction as "a piece of whimsy and a bit of a gag". After the announcement of the auction, Bloomberg listed the jockstrap as one of the most bizarre items for sale. The jockstrap sold for $7,000 ($8,450 with Buyer's Premium), more than ten times the estimated price of $500 to $600, which also led to a flurry of coverage on this high sales price. Crowe later admitted that he was surprised that it turned out to be one of the most popular items of the sale.

The jockstrap and other items were bought by the HBO television show Last Week Tonight with John Oliver, which Oliver revealed on his April 15, 2018 show. As a thank-you, Crowe donated the money Last Week Tonight paid to the Australia Zoo which used it to fund the "John Oliver Koala Chlamydia Ward". Oliver jokingly revealed that getting a Koala Chlamydia ward named after him was his one-and-only goal for the show, and was therefore ending the series then and there.

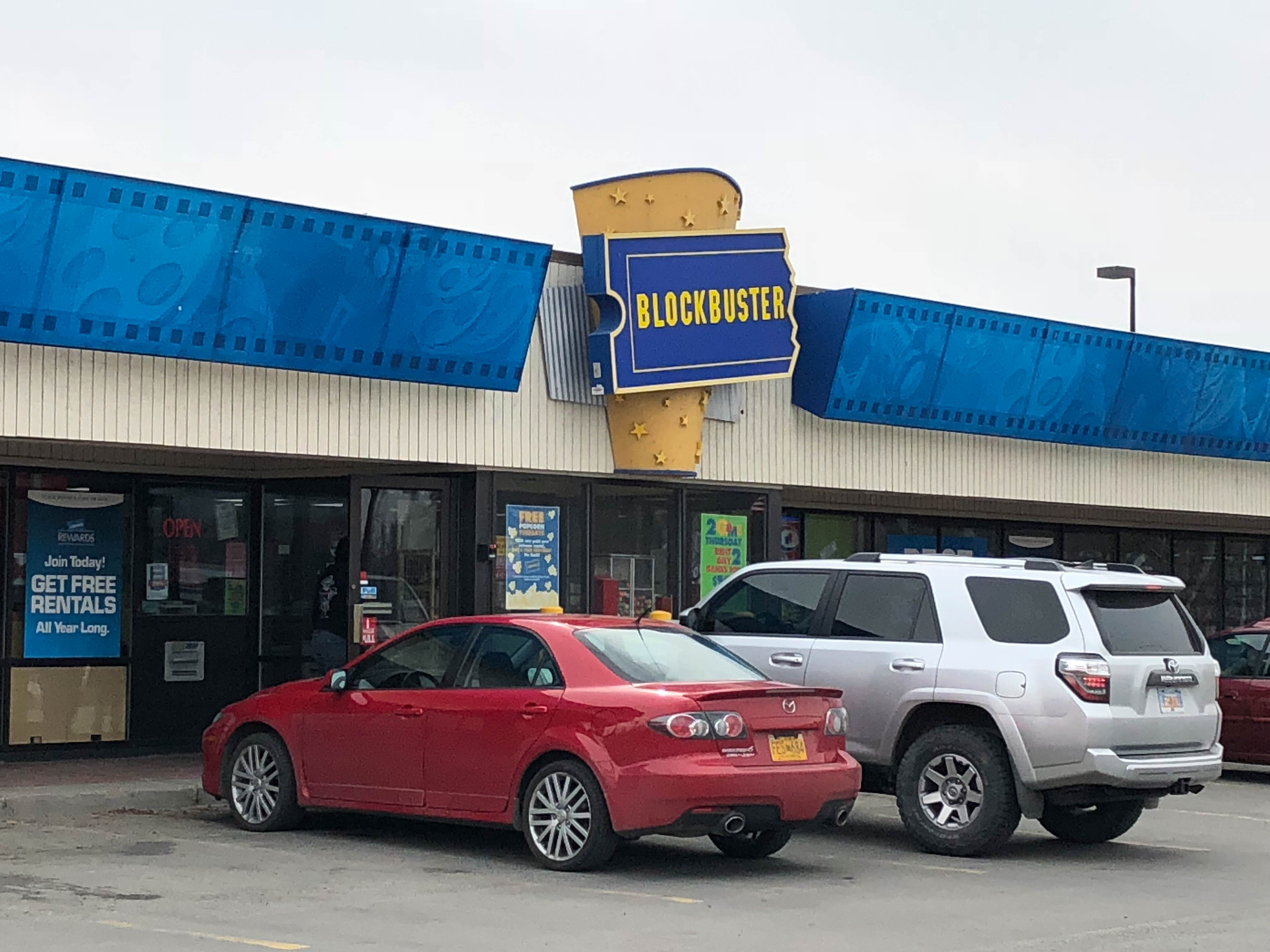
The recipient of the memorabilia, the Alaskan Blockbuster store that was located at 5600 DeBarr Road

Subsequently, the memorabilia, including the jockstrap, were donated to the last operating Alaskan Blockbuster Video store in Anchorage. The jockstrap remained there in a glass case along with other items from the Crowe auction and became a local attraction. However, the items failed to prevent the store from closing in July 2018. Afterwards, the owners of the Alaska store sent all their memorabilia to the last remaining Blockbuster Video store in the United States, located in Bend, Oregon. However, Crowe's jockstrap was missing from the items sent to this store, with Oliver claiming in September 2018 that he did not know its location.

== Reappearance and auctioning ==
In November during the final episode of the 2018 season of Last Week Tonight, Oliver revealed that the show had reacquired the jockstrap and used it in a comedy skit. The skit is a parody of The Fast and the Furious starring Armie Hammer and five wax US presidents that Oliver's show had previously acquired from a wax museum sale. In the end of the skit, Crowe appears as a mob boss holding the jockstrap he had ordered stolen.

In the November 16, 2025 show, John Oliver announced that the jockstrap, along with many of the show's memorabilia, was put for auction in order to raise funds for public TV and radio stations who have been impacted by the government's decision to end public broadcast funding.

Oliver announced in October 2026 that the show had reacquired the jockstrap for $10,000 in a subsequent auction.
