= Last Week Tonight with John Oliver season 2 =

2015 television series season

Last Week Tonight with John Oliver
- Season 2
- Promotional poster for the season
- No. of episodes: 35

Release
- Original network: HBO
- Original release: February 8 – November 22, 2015

Season chronology
- ← Previous; Season 1 Next → Season 3

The second season of late-night talk and news satire television program Last Week Tonight with John Oliver originally aired between February 8, 2015, and November 22, 2015, on HBO in the United States. The season was produced by Avalon Television and Sixteen String Jack Productions; the executive producers were host John Oliver, Tim Carvell, and Liz Stanton, with Paul Pennolino as director.

Last Week Tonight aired on Sundays at 11 pm, totaling 35 episodes in season two. The season was generally well-received, winning three Emmy Awards, one Critics' Choice Television Award, one PGA Award, one Dorian Award, and one Webby Award. The show continued to release the main stories of each broadcast on its YouTube channel after each episode aired. Episodes fifteen and sixteen of season two, covering the 2015 FIFA corruption case and the Miss America beauty pageant, respectively, were credited with influencing US law and culture, a phenomenon dubbed the "John Oliver effect".

== Production ==
Season two aired from February 8, 2015, to November 22, 2015. The season was produced by Avalon Television and Sixteen String Jack Productions; it aired on HBO in the United States at 11 pm on Sundays. Tim Carvell, John Oliver, and Liz Stanton were the executive producers on the season, with Diane Fitzgerald as producer. Writers included Oliver, Carvell, Kevin Avery, Josh Gondelman, Dan Gurewitch, Geoff Haggerty, Jeff Maurer, Scott Sherman, Will Tracy, Jill Twiss, and Juli Weiner. Paul Pennolino directed the season.

The season's promotional material emphasized that the format would remain essentially the same as the previous season; the episode starts with short segments recapping the week's news, leading into a longer, more well-researched main story. The material also highlighted the Last Week Tonight YouTube channel, where the main stories of each episode were released after airing. In an interview with The Verge, Oliver noted that the research team at Last Week Tonight was expanded from one researcher to four; the new hires all had backgrounds in investigative journalism. Regarding what stories would be discussed, Oliver said he hoped to visit major topics in the news, but that many of the segments would focus on topics from the past; on the team's selection process, he said, "We don’t really get wrapped up in the week-of stories as much ... In general, we tend to wait until something is over, then look back at it and do an analysis."

== Reception ==
=== Critical reception ===
On the review aggregator site Rotten Tomatoes, the season has an approval rating of 100% based on six reviews. The second season was generally well-received; Lucas Kavner writing in Vulture called it "easily the most enjoyable way to relive some of this year’s most infuriating news." Critics continued to compare the show to Comedy Central's The Daily Show, where Oliver worked as the British correspondent from 2006 to 2013. David Waywell writing in The Spectator opined that the early seasons of Last Week Tonight had better writing than the Trevor Noah-hosted The Daily Show. "Government Surveillance" was rated the best episode of the season by Matthew Strauss writing in Inverse; Strauss was particularly impressed by the interview with Edward Snowden, and wrote that Last Week Tonight "shouldn’t just win an Emmy for this episode. They should win a Pulitzer."

=== Ratings ===
The premiere broadcast of season two received 720,000 viewers, similar to the last episode of season one. In the first three months of 2015, Last Week Tonight averaged 1.396 million total viewers per episode, making it the seventh most-viewed late-night show of the quarter. The show continued to release the main stories of episodes to the Last Week Tonight YouTube channel, which held over 2 million subscribers in September 2015. In April 2024, HBO announced that the full episodes of seasons one through eight would be released on the Last Week Tonight YouTube channel.

=== Awards ===
Last Week Tonight received six Emmy nominations for season two, winning Outstanding Variety Talk Series, Outstanding Writing for a Variety Series, and Outstanding Picture Editing For Variety Programming for the segment "Public Defenders". Additionally, the show received the Critics' Choice Television Award for Best Talk Show, the Producers Guild of America Award for Best Live Entertainment & Talk Television, the Dorian Award for TV Current Affairs Show of the Year, and the Webby Award for Best Writing in Social.

=== Influence ===
Coverage of an issue by Last Week Tonight has been credited with influencing US legislature and culture, a phenomenon dubbed the "John Oliver effect". Episode fifteen of season two was about the 2015 FIFA corruption case, being the second time Last Week Tonight covered FIFA. Oliver encouraged the US government to force the President of FIFA Sepp Blatter to resign, and promised to advertise for FIFA-sponsoring companies if Blatter resigned. Two days after the episode aired and a week after the case was released, Blatter resigned. In addition, episode sixteen of season two covered bail in the United States, a system that Oliver accused of disproportionately affecting poor people more than wealthy people. A month after the episode aired, the mayor of New York City Bill de Blasio announced that the city would lower bail requirements for people accused of misdemeanors and nonviolent crimes. However, Oliver later denied influencing the decision, stating that the requirements were already in the process of being changed when the episode aired.

== Episodes ==
List of episodes in season two
No. overall	No. in season	Main segment	Original release date	U.S. viewers (millions)
25	1	Pharmaceutical marketing	February 8, 2015	0.72
Other segments: RadioShack, President of Ecuador Rafael Correa; Guest: Actor Brian Huskey
26	2	Tobacco	February 15, 2015	0.51
Main article: Tobacco (Last Week Tonight); Other segments: Yemen, Fifty Shades of Grey, Sports Illustrated Swimsuit Issue
27	3	Judicial elections	February 22, 2015	0.47
Other segments: National Economy and Finance Minister of Greece, President of Russia Vladimir Putin's visit to Cairo, UK Labour Party's Woman to Woman campaign, CNN weatherman Chad Myers, Chinese New Year
28	4	Infrastructure	March 1, 2015	0.71
Other segment: Assassination of Boris Nemtsov; Guests: Actors Edward Norton, Steve Buscemi, Vincent D'Onofrio, Josh Lucas, Campbell Scott, Hope Davis, Dan Hedaya
29	5	Voting rights in the US territories	March 8, 2015	0.69
Other segments: Ferguson unrest, 2015 Israeli legislative election, Fanta controversy, daylight savings time
30	6	National Collegiate Athletic Association	March 15, 2015	0.84
Other segments: March 2015 ISIS alliance, rapper Nelly's Iraq performance, Ireland's accidental legalization of drugs, Operation Car Wash
31	7	Municipal violations	March 22, 2015	0.78
Other segments: Prime Minister of Israel Benjamin Netanyahu after the 2015 Israeli legislative election, Starbucks "Race Together" campaign, New Hampshire legislature's response to a bill presented by fourth graders
32	8	Government surveillance	April 5, 2015	0.65
Other segments: Iran nuclear deal, President of Nigeria Muhammadu Buhari, US President Barack Obama and South Dakota; Guest: NSA whistleblower Edward Snowden; Note: This episode was 45 minutes long instead of the regular 30 minutes due to the interview with Snowden.
33	9	Internal Revenue Service	April 12, 2015	1.32
Other segments: Hillary Clinton's 2016 presidential campaign, 2015 United Kingdom general election, Cuba; Guest: Singer-songwriter Michael Bolton
34	10	Patent trolls	April 19, 2015	1.45
Other segments: President of Russia Vladimir Putin's question and answer session, killing of Eric Harris, Earth Day, Turner Doomsday Video; Guest: Actor Martin Sheen
35	11	Fashion	April 26, 2015	1.39
Other segment: Armenian genocide, Prime Minister of New Zealand John Key, Mehmet Oz's false medical claims
36	12	Standardized testing	May 3, 2015	1.40
Other segments: 2015 Baltimore protests, Venezuelan president hit with a message written on mango, 2015 Bud Light controversy Guests: Actors Wyatt Cenac, Rachel Feinstein, Alex Karpovsky
37	13	Maternity leave	May 10, 2015	1.20
Other segments: Results of the 2015 United Kingdom general election, Prime Minister of Cambodia Hun Sen's reaction to Floyd Mayweather Jr. vs. Manny Pacquiao, 2015 Moscow Victory Day Parade; Guests: Actors Bob Balaban, America Ferrera, Erinn Hayes, David Wain
38	14	Poultry farming	May 17, 2015	1.04
Other segments: US's National Security Administration, President of FIFA Sepp Blatter, Johnny Depp's violation of Australian biosecurity laws
39	15	2015 FIFA corruption case	May 31, 2015	1.39
Other segment: Cuba, Nebraska's repeal of the death penalty, Ireland's legalization of same-sex marriage, Nazi imagery in Thailand; Guest: Actor Rip Taylor
40	16	Bail in the United States	June 7, 2015	1.26
Other segment: Sepp Blatter's resignation as president of FIFA, Office of Personnel Management data breach, golden toilets in Turkey, United States Triple Crown; Guests: Actors Becky Ann Baker, Michael Torpey, William Stephenson, Dean Winters
41	17	Torture	June 14, 2015	1.26
Other segments: President of Russia Vladimir Putin, 2015 European Games, Canadian Senate expenses scandal, Vice President of FIFA Jack Warner; Guest: Actor Helen Mirren
42	18	Online harassment and revenge porn	June 21, 2015	1.37
Other segments: Charleston church shooting, redesign of the $10 bill to feature a woman, Patriot Park; Guests: Actors Colin Hanks, Rob Huebel
43	19	Transgender Rights	June 28, 2015	1.24
Other segment: CNN's ISIS flag mistake, National Federation of Independent Business v. Sebelius, President of Ukraine Viktor Yanukovych's pet ostriches, leap second Guest: Actor Bobby Cannavale
44	20	Sports stadiums	July 12, 2015	1.01
Other segments: Iran nuclear deal, Greek withdrawal from the Eurozone, Confederate battle flag
45	21	Food waste	July 19, 2015	1.04
Other segments: Iran nuclear deal, Joaquín "El Chapo" Guzmán's escape from prison, Laibach at National Liberation Day of Korea
46	22	Mandatory sentencing	July 26, 2015	0.94
Other segments: Iran nuclear deal, FIFA, Ashley Madison data breach
47	23	Washington D.C. voting rights and statehood movement	August 2, 2015	0.98
Other segments: Afghanistan, Chechen teens influencing ISIS, Baron Sewel sex scandal
48	24	Sex education in the United States	August 9, 2015	0.93
Other segment: First Republican debate of the 2016 election, 2015 pornography ban in India, Whole Foods; Guests: Actors Laverne Cox, Kumail Nanjiani, Megan Mullally, Nick Offerman, Jack McBrayer, Aisha Tyler, Jonathan Banks, Kristen Schaal
49	25	Televangelism	August 16, 2015	1.01
Main article: Our Lady of Perpetual Exemption; Other segments: Reopening of the US embassy in Cuba, Warren G. Harding's illegitimate child, New Zealand flag debate Guest: Actor Rachel Dratch
50	26	LGBT rights in the United States	August 23, 2015	1.03
Other segments: North Korea–South Korea relations, Russia's import embargo, resignation of Greek Prime Minister Alexis Tsipras
51	27	Public defenders in the United States	September 13, 2015	0.69
Other segments: Todd Courser and Cindy Gamrat scandal, 2015 Guatemalan general election, Queen of the UK Elizabeth II; Guests: Actors Danny Pino, Regina King, Jeremy Sisto, Robert John Burke, Josh Lucas, Kevin Chapman, Dennis Quaid, Sonja Sohn, Rachel Dratch
52	28	European migrant crisis	September 27, 2015	0.66
Other segments: Pope Francis' visit to the United States, Piggate, Volkswagen emissions violations Guests: Actors James Scott, Alison Sweeney
53	29	Mental health in the United States	October 4, 2015	0.68
Other segments: Russian military intervention in the Syrian civil war, 2015 UN general assembly debate, Jason Chaffetz, Peeple mobile app Guest: Actor Mario Van Peebles
54	30	North Dakota oil boom	October 11, 2015	0.70
Other segments: US and Russia in the Syrian Civil War, 2015 FIFA corruption case, ISIS's use of Toyota vehicles
55	31	2015 Canadian federal election	October 18, 2015	0.72
Other segments: Prime Minister of New Zealand John Key, President of Mexico Enrique Peña Nieto's public image, Danish zoos, quotations Guest: Actor Mike Myers
56	32	2015 United States elections and the medicaid coverage gap	November 1, 2015	0.69
Other segments: China and Kenny G, Vienna peace talks for Syria, 2015 Ukrainian local elections, tax credits in the United Kingdom; Guest: Saxophonist Kenny G
57	33	Prisoner reentry	November 8, 2015	0.91
Other segments: Mass surveillance in the United Kingdom, paid patriotism in sports, Washington Redskins name controversy Guest: Exoneree Bilal Chatman
58	34	Daily fantasy sports	November 15, 2015	0.71
Other segments: November 2015 Paris attacks, Singles' Day in China, India's claim of ownership over the Koh-i-Noor diamond Guests: Actors Seth Rogen, Kathryn Hahn, Martin Starr, Jerrod Carmichael, Adam Pally, Mike Birbiglia
59	35	US pennies	November 22, 2015	0.78
Other segments: November 2015 Paris attacks, refugees of the Syrian Civil War; Guests: Actor Rachel Dratch
