= Last Week Tonight with John Oliver season 1 =

2014 television series season

Last Week Tonight with John Oliver
- Season 1
- Promotional poster for the season
- No. of episodes: 24

Release
- Original network: HBO
- Original release: April 27 – November 9, 2014

Season chronology
- Next → Season 2

The first season of late-night talk and news satire television program Last Week Tonight with John Oliver originally aired between April 27, 2014, and November 9, 2014, on HBO in the United States. The season was produced by Avalon Television, and the executive producers were host John Oliver, Tim Carvell, James Taylor, and Jon Thoday, with Joe Perota as director.

The season contained 24 episodes, each featuring a main segment on that week's news story and several other smaller segments. Last Week Tonight aired on Sundays at 11 pm, each episode having been taped hours before. The season was generally well-received, and won an Emmy Award, Peabody Award, TCA Award, Webby Award, and WGA Award. It received an average audience of 4.1 million weekly viewers. The main segments were also posted to the show's YouTube channel after airing. The show's fifth episode, which dealt with net neutrality in the United States, was credited with influencing the Federal Communications Commission's decision to strongly regulate net neutrality, beginning a phenomenon dubbed the "John Oliver effect".

== Background and production ==
The host of Last Week Tonight, John Oliver, was the British correspondent on Jon Stewart's The Daily Show. In 2013, Oliver guest-hosted the show for eight weeks while Stewart directed his film Rosewater. Oliver's time as host received positive reviews, with some critics suggesting Oliver receive his own show or take over The Daily Show once Stewart left. Three months after Oliver's time as host ended, HBO announced it was giving Oliver his own late-night show.

In an interview for U.S. News & World Report, executive producer Tim Carvell said the structure of the show was designed to provide short breaks in content so that the audience did not have "to hear anybody talk ... for a half an hour straight", given HBO's ad-free model. These breaks were implemented using comedic act to split up the different segments of the show. Carvell continued that the uncensored nature of HBO allowed for the producers to implement explicit content and for Oliver to swear unbleeped.

Season one aired from April 27, 2014, to November 9, 2014. Each episode was taped at CBS Broadcast Center a few hours before broadcasting at 11 pm. The first season was produced by Avalon Television and aired by HBO in the United States. The executive producers were Oliver, Carvell, James Taylor, and Jon Thoday, with Liz Stanton as producer. Writers include Oliver, Carvell, Kevin Avery, Dan Gurewitch, Geoff Haggerty, Jeff Maurer, Scott Sherman, William Tracy, Jill Twiss, and Juli Weiner, with Joe Perota as director.

== Reception ==
=== Critical reception ===
On the review aggregator site Rotten Tomatoes, the season has an approval rating of 94%, with an average score of 8.5 out of 10 based on 31 reviews. The website's critical consensus reads, "John Oliver successfully transitions from correspondent to host in Last Week Tonight, a biting, often brilliant addition to the satirical news circuit." Metacritic gave the season a score—a weighted average based on the impression of 14 critical reviews—of 76, signifying "generally favorable reviews".

The first episode was generally well received. Many critics compared it to The Daily Show; some thought it did not set itself apart from The Daily Show. Contrarily, Darren Franich writing in Entertainment Weekly felt Last Week Tonight maintained similarity to The Daily Show, but set itself apart in the thoroughness and level of detail in the news stories presented; Franich gave the show an A− rating. Another reviewer opined that Oliver should have filled the Comedy Central slot left by The Colbert Report when it moved to CBS instead of "leaping at HBO's offer". Tim Goodman writing in The Hollywood Reporter felt the 30-minute time slot was too short, and that the first episode felt "rushed and jam-packed with information". Multiple reviewers praised Oliver's passion on the topics of the first episode.

=== Ratings ===
The first episode, aired at 11 pm, received 1.1 million viewers, rising to 1.4 million after a second play. In comparison, The Daily Show averaged 1.5 million viewers simultaneously, and The Colbert Report averaged 1.2 million viewers at 11:30 pm. Across TV airings, DVR, on-demand, and HBO Go, the first season received an average audience of 4.1 million weekly viewers, just over that of HBO's other popular late-night show, the older Real Time with Bill Maher. In addition, the main segments of each episode were posted to Last Week Tonight's YouTube channel for free viewing; the show's segment on the 2014 Scottish independence referendum received 3 million views within its first week. In April 2024, HBO announced that the full episodes of seasons one through eight would be released on the Last Week Tonight YouTube channel.

=== Awards ===
Last Week Tonight was recognized with a Peabody Award "for bringing satire and journalism even closer together", particularly regarding the show's coverage of net neutrality in its fifth episode. Season one received the Emmy Award for Outstanding Interactive Program, the TCA Award for Outstanding Achievement in News and Information, the Webby Award for Best Writing in Social, and the WGA Award for Television: Comedy-Variety Talk Series.

=== Influence ===
Coverage of an issue by Last Week Tonight has been credited with influencing US legislature and culture, a phenomenon dubbed the "John Oliver effect". The first season's fifth episode, covering net neutrality in the United States, was the first episode to have this effect. After discussing the problems regarding a subject previously regarded as obscure and technical, Oliver argued the Federal Communications Commission (FCC) had the power to fix net neutrality problems, and encouraged viewers to submit comments on the FCC's website. Soon after the episode aired, the FCC's website crashed. The FCC chairman Tom Wheeler publicly addressed the video, and the following year, the FCC implemented strong net neutrality rules that classified broadband internet service as a public utility; Oliver was credited with helping to push this change. Furthermore, the 18th episode covered the Miss America beauty pageant, in which Oliver exposed the false claim made by Miss America that they gave $45 million in scholarships yearly to competitors. The Last Week Tonight writing team, which included four researchers with backgrounds in journalism, analyzed the organization's tax forms and found that only a small percentage of the claimed $45 million was actually granted to competitors. At the end of the episode, Oliver told viewers to donate to other women's scholarship organizations instead, specifically naming the Society of Women Engineers. Two days after airing, the Society of Women Engineers had received $25,000 in donations, which amounted to about 15% of the society's average annual donations.

== Episodes ==
List of episodes in season one
No. overall	No. in season	Main segment	Original release date	U.S. viewers (millions)
1	1	POM Wonderful LLC v. Coca-Cola Co.	April 27, 2014	1.11
Other segments: 2014 Indian general election, US National Security Agency; Guests: NSA director Keith B. Alexander, singer-songwriter Lisa Loeb
2	2	Capital punishment	May 4, 2014	1.19
Other segments: President of France François Hollande, Sultan of Brunei Hassanal Bolkiah; Guest: Documentary filmmaker Simon Ostrovsky
3	3	Climate change denial	May 11, 2014	1.01
Other segments: 2014 United States Senate election in Kentucky, Russia–Ukraine relations, Eurovision Song Contest 2014; Guest: Scientist and TV presenter Bill Nye
4	4	Right to be forgotten (Google Spain v AEPD and Mario Costeja González)	May 18, 2014	1.03
Other segments: General Motors ignition switch recalls, 2014 Indian general election Guest: Journalist Fareed Zakaria
5	5	Net neutrality	June 1, 2014	0.99
Main article: Net Neutrality (Last Week Tonight with John Oliver); Other segments: 2014 European Parliament election, 2014 Ukrainian presidential election, Prime Minister of Australia Tony Abbott, 87th Scripps National Spelling Bee
6	6	FIFA	June 8, 2014	0.95
Other segments: 1989 Tiananmen Square protests and massacre, President of Syria Bashar al-Assad; Guest: Pop band Right Said Fred
7	7	Immigration reform in the United States	June 15, 2014	0.91
Other segments: Washington Redskins name controversy, war in Iraq; Guest: Theoretical physicist Stephen Hawking
8	8	Dr. Oz's June 2014 Senate hearing	June 22, 2014	0.89
Other segments: Dietary Supplement Health and Education Act of 1994, monarchies, tourism in Antarctica; Guests: Author George R. R. Martin, actor Steve Buscemi
9	9	Burwell v. Hobby Lobby	June 29, 2014	0.85
Other segment: LGBT rights in Uganda; Guest: LGBT rights activist Pepe Julian Onziema
10	10	Income inequality and wealth inequality	July 13, 2014	0.84
Other segments: Foreign policy of Japan, US president Warren G. Harding's love letters, public image of CIA
11	11	Incarceration in the United States	July 20, 2014	0.92
Other segments: Israeli–Palestinian conflict, Malaysia Airlines Flight 17, Commonwealth Games
12	12	Nuclear weapons and the United States	July 27, 2014	1.00
Other segments: Islamic State, Russia's miscommunication with mating geckos lost in space
13	13	Native advertising	August 3, 2014	0.96
Other segment: Argentine debt restructuring
14	14	Payday loans	August 10, 2014	0.94
Other segment: Russia's import embargo on U.S. chicken and soybeans Guest: Actress Sarah Silverman
15	15	Shooting of Michael Brown and police militarization	August 17, 2014	1.03
Other segment: Equal pay for equal work
16	16	Student debt	September 7, 2014	0.66
Other segment: Eulogy for mating space geckos Guest: Music duo A Great Big World
17	17	Scottish independence referendum	September 14, 2014	0.70
Other segment: Twitter
18	18	Miss America 2015	September 21, 2014	0.83
Other segments: United States embargo against Cuba; Guest: Actress Kathy Griffin
19	19	Drones	September 28, 2014	0.71
Other segment: Kansas state budget shortfall
20	20	Civil forfeiture in the United States	October 5, 2014	0.66
Other segment: 2014 Hong Kong protests, 2014 Brazilian general election, 2022 Winter Olympics; Guests: Actors Jeff Goldblum, Kathryn Erbe, Robert John Burke, John Fiore
21	21	Special Immigrant Visa	October 19, 2014	0.62
Other segment: Supreme Court of the United States; Guest: Afghan translator Mohammad Usafi
22	22	Sugar	October 26, 2014	0.76
Other segment: Toronto mayoral candidate Doug Ford, Jr. Guest: Primatologist Jane Goodall
23	23	2014 United States state legislative elections and ALEC	November 2, 2014	0.60
Other segment: Robot employees at Lowe's, 2014 Hungarian Internet tax protests Guests: Actors Nick Offerman, H. Jon Benjamin, Sarah Baker
24	24	Lotteries	November 9, 2014	0.80
Other segments: Turkey's Presidential Complex, salmon cannon
