= Results of the 2015 United Kingdom general election =

== Results by parliamentary constituency ==
The results of the 2015 United Kingdom general election, by parliamentary constituency were as follows:

Constituency	Cnty	Rgn	Last elctn	Winning party				Turnout (Note: Excludes spoilt ballots)	Votes													
Constituency	Cnty	Rgn	Last elctn	Party	Votes	Share	Majrty	Turnout	Con (Note: Excludes Speaker)	Lab (Note: Includes Labour Party and allied Co-operative Party)	UKIP	LD	SNP	Grn (Note: Includes Green Party of England and Wales, Scottish Green Party and Green Party in Northern Ireland)	DUP	PC	SF	UUP	SDLP	APNI	Other (Note: Includes all other parties, all independent candidates and the Speaker)	Total
Aberavon	WGM	WLS	Lab	Lab	15,416	48.9%	10,445	63.3%	3,742	15,416	4,971	1,397		711		3,663					1,623	31,523
Aberconwy	CON	WLS	Con	Con	12,513	41.5%	3,999	66.2%	12,513	8,514	3,467	1,391		727		3,536						30,148
Aberdeen North	SCT	SCT	Lab	SNP	24,793	56.4%	13,396	64.9%	5,304	11,397		2,050	24,793								392	43,936
Aberdeen South	SCT	SCT	Lab	SNP	20,221	41.6%	7,230	71.3%	11,087	12,991	897	2,252	20,221	964							139	48,551
Airdrie and Shotts	SCT	SCT	Lab	SNP	23,887	53.9%	8,779	66.3%	3,389	15,108	1,088	678	23,887								136	44,286
Aldershot	HAM	SE	Con	Con	23,369	50.6%	14,901	63.8%	23,369	8,468	8,253	4,076		2,025								46,191
Aldridge-Brownhills	WMD	WM	Con	Con	20,558	52.0%	11,723	65.6%	20,558	8,835	7,751	1,330		826							197	39,497
Altrincham and Sale West	GTM	NW	Con	Con	26,771	53.0%	13,290	70.6%	26,771	13,481	4,047	4,235		1,983								50,517
Alyn and Deeside	CON	WLS	Lab	Lab	16,540	40.0%	3,343	66.6%	13,197	16,540	7,260	1,733		976		1,608						41,314
Amber Valley	DBY	EM	Con	Con	20,106	44.0%	4,205	65.8%	20,106	15,901	7,263	1,360		1,087								45,717
Angus	SCT	SCT	SNP	SNP	24,130	54.2%	11,230	67.6%	12,900	3,919	1,355	1,216	24,130	965								44,485
Arfon	GWN	WLS	PC	PC	11,790	43.9%	3,668	66.3%	3,521	8,122	2,277	718				11,790					409	26,837
Argyll and Bute	SCT	SCT	LD	SNP	22,959	44.3%	8,473	75.3%	7,733	5,394	1,311	14,486	22,959									51,883
Arundel and South Downs	WSX	SE	Con	Con	34,331	60.8%	26,177	73.1%	34,331	6,324	8,154	4,062		3,606								56,477
Ashfield	NTT	EM	Lab	Lab	19,448	41.0%	8,820	61.5%	10,628	19,448	10,150	7,030									153	47,409
Ashford	KEN	SE	Con	Con	30,094	52.5%	19,296	67.4%	30,094	10,580	10,798	3,433		2,467								57,372
Ashton-under-Lyne	GTM	NW	Lab	Lab	19,366	49.8%	10,756	56.9%	8,610	19,366	8,468	943		1,531								38,918
Aylesbury	BKM	SE	Con	Con	28,083	50.7%	17,158	69.0%	28,083	8,391	10,925	5,885		2,135								55,419
Ayr, Carrick and Cumnock	SCT	SCT	Lab	SNP	25,492	48.8%	11,265	71.5%	10,355	14,227	1,280	855	25,492									52,209
Banbury	OXF	SE	Con	Con	30,749	53.0%	18,395	67.1%	30,749	12,354	8,050	3,440		2,686							729	58,008
Banff and Buchan	SCT	SCT	SNP	SNP	27,487	60.2%	14,339	66.5%	13,148	2,647		2,347	27,487									45,629
Barking	LND	LND	Lab	Lab	24,826	57.7%	15,272	58.2%	7,019	24,826	9,554	562		897							183	43,041
Barnsley Central	SYK	YTH	Lab	Lab	20,376	55.7%	12,435	56.7%	5,485	20,376	7,941	770		938							1,050	36,560
Barnsley East	SYK	YTH	Lab	Lab	21,079	54.7%	12,034	55.7%	5,622	21,079	9,045	1,217									1,554	38,517
Barrow and Furness	CMA	NW	Lab	Lab	18,320	42.3%	795	63.3%	17,525	18,320	5,070	1,169		1,061							130	43,275
Basildon and Billericay	ESS	E	Con	Con	22,668	52.7%	12,482	64.9%	22,668	10,186	8,538	1,636										43,028
Basingstoke	HAM	SE	Con	Con	25,769	48.6%	11,063	66.6%	25,769	14,706	8,290	3,919									392	53,076
Bassetlaw	NTT	EM	Lab	Lab	23,965	48.6%	8,843	64.2%	15,122	23,965	7,865	1,331		1,006								49,289
Bath	AVN	SW	LD	Con	17,833	37.8%	3,833	74.8%	17,833	6,216	2,922	14,000		5,634							562	47,167
Batley and Spen	WYK	YTH	Lab	Lab	21,826	43.2%	6,057	64.4%	15,769	21,826	9,080	2,396		1,232							176	50,479
Battersea	LND	LND	Con	Con	26,730	52.4%	7,938	67.0%	26,730	18,792	1,586	2,241		1,682								51,031
Beaconsfield	BKM	SE	Con	Con	33,621	63.2%	26,311	71.1%	33,621	6,074	7,310	3,927		2,231								53,163
Beckenham	LND	LND	Con	Con	27,955	57.3%	18,471	72.4%	27,955	9,484	6,108	3,378		1,878								48,803
Bedford	BDF	E	Con	Con	19,625	42.6%	1,097	66.5%	19,625	18,528	4,434	1,958		1,412							129	46,086
Belfast East	NIR	NIR	APNI	DUP	19,575	49.3%	2,597	62.8%	1,121					1,058	19,575		823		127	16,978		39,682
Belfast North	NIR	NIR	DUP	DUP	19,096	47.0%	5,326	59.2%							19,096		13,770		3,338	2,941	1,448	40,593
Belfast South	NIR	NIR	SDLP	SDLP	9,560	24.5%	906	60.0%	582		1,900			2,238	8,654		5,402	3,549	9,560	6,711	361	38,957
Belfast West	NIR	NIR	SF	SF	19,163	54.2%	12,365	56.3%	34		765				2,773		19,163	1,088	3,475	636	7,395	35,329
Bermondsey and Old Southwark	LND	LND	LD	Lab	22,146	43.1%	4,489	61.7%	6,051	22,146	3,254	17,657		2,023							293	51,424
Berwickshire, Roxburgh and Selkirk	SCT	SCT	LD	SNP	20,145	36.6%	328	74.2%	19,817	2,700	1,316	10,294	20,145	631							135	55,038
Berwick-upon-Tweed	NBL	NE	LD	Con	16,603	41.1%	4,914	71.0%	16,603	6,042	4,513	11,689		1,488							88	40,423
Bethnal Green and Bow	LND	LND	Lab	Lab	32,387	61.2%	24,317	64.0%	8,070	32,387	3,219	2,395		4,906							1,947	52,924
Beverley and Holderness	HUM	YTH	Con	Con	25,363	48.1%	12,203	65.2%	25,363	13,160	8,794	2,900		1,802							658	52,677
Bexhill and Battle	SXE	SE	Con	Con	30,245	54.8%	20,075	70.1%	30,245	7,797	10,170	4,199		2,807								55,218
Bexleyheath and Crayford	LND	LND	Con	Con	20,643	47.3%	9,192	67.4%	20,643	11,451	9,182	1,308		950							151	43,685
Birkenhead	MSY	NW	Lab	Lab	26,468	67.6%	20,652	62.7%	5,816	26,468	3,838	1,396		1,626								39,144
Birmingham Edgbaston	WMD	WM	Lab	Lab	18,518	44.8%	2,706	63.0%	15,812	18,518	4,154	1,184		1,371							254	41,293
Birmingham Erdington	WMD	WM	Lab	Lab	15,824	45.6%	5,129	53.3%	10,695	15,824	6,040	965		948							212	34,684
Birmingham Hall Green	WMD	WM	Lab	Lab	28,147	59.8%	19,818	61.6%	8,329	28,147	2,131	5,459		2,200							780	47,046
Birmingham Hodge Hill	WMD	WM	Lab	Lab	28,069	68.4%	23,362	54.5%	4,707	28,069	4,651	2,624		835							153	41,039
Birmingham Ladywood	WMD	WM	Lab	Lab	26,444	73.6%	21,868	52.7%	4,576	26,444	1,805	1,374		1,501							216	35,916
Birmingham Northfield	WMD	WM	Lab	Lab	17,673	41.6%	2,509	59.4%	15,164	17,673	7,106	1,349		1,169								42,461
Birmingham Perry Barr	WMD	WM	Lab	Lab	23,697	57.4%	14,828	59.0%	8,869	23,697	5,032	2,001		1,330							331	41,260
Birmingham Selly Oak	WMD	WM	Lab	Lab	21,584	47.7%	8,447	60.3%	13,137	21,584	5,755	2,517		2,301								45,294
Birmingham Yardley	WMD	WM	LD	Lab	17,129	41.6%	6,595	57.0%	5,760	17,129	6,637	10,534		698							393	41,151
Bishop Auckland	DUR	NE	Lab	Lab	16,307	41.4%	3,508	59.6%	12,799	16,307	7,015	1,723		1,545								39,389
Blackburn	LAN	NW	Lab	Lab	24,762	56.3%	12,760	60.1%	12,002	24,762	6,280	955										43,999
Blackley and Broughton	GTM	NW	Lab	Lab	22,982	61.9%	16,874	51.6%	5,581	22,982	6,108	874		1,567								37,112
Blackpool North and Cleveleys	LAN	NW	Con	Con	17,508	44.4%	3,340	63.1%	17,508	14,168	5,823	948		889							57	39,393
Blackpool South	LAN	NW	Lab	Lab	13,548	41.8%	2,585	56.5%	10,963	13,548	5,613	743		841							728	32,436
Blaenau Gwent	GNT	WLS	Lab	Lab	18,380	58.0%	12,703	61.7%	3,419	18,380	5,677	620		738		2,849						31,683
Blaydon	TWR	NE	Lab	Lab	22,090	49.2%	14,227	66.2%	7,838	22,090	7,863	5,497		1,648								44,936
Blyth Valley	NBL	NE	Lab	Lab	17,813	46.3%	9,229	62.8%	8,346	17,813	8,584	2,265		1,453								38,461
Bognor Regis and Littlehampton	WSX	SE	Con	Con	24,185	51.3%	13,944	64.5%	24,185	6,508	10,241	4,240		1,942								47,116
Bolsover	DBY	EM	Lab	Lab	22,542	51.2%	11,778	61.1%	10,764	22,542	9,228	1,464										43,998
Bolton North East	GTM	NW	Lab	Lab	18,541	43.0%	4,377	63.6%	14,164	18,541	8,117	1,236		1,103								43,161
Bolton South East	GTM	NW	Lab	Lab	20,555	50.5%	10,928	58.5%	8,289	20,555	9,627	1,072		1,200								40,743
Bolton West	GTM	NW	Lab	Con	19,744	40.6%	801	66.8%	19,744	18,943	7,428	1,947									530	48,592
Bootle	MSY	NW	Lab	Lab	33,619	74.5%	28,704	64.4%	3,639	33,619	4,915	978		1,501							500	45,152
Boston and Skegness	LIN	EM	Con	Con	18,981	43.8%	4,336	64.6%	18,981	7,142	14,645	1,015		800							756	43,339
Bosworth	LEI	EM	Con	Con	22,939	42.8%	10,988	67.2%	22,939	9,354	9,338	11,951										53,582
Bournemouth East	DOR	SW	Con	Con	22,060	49.2%	14,612	62.0%	22,060	7,448	7,401	3,752		3,263							903	44,827
Bournemouth West	DOR	SW	Con	Con	20,155	48.2%	12,410	58.0%	20,155	7,386	7,745	3,281		3,107							99	41,773
Bracknell	BRK	SE	Con	Con	29,606	55.8%	20,650	65.3%	29,606	8,956	8,339	3,983		2,202								53,086
Bradford East	WYK	YTH	LD	Lab	19,312	46.6%	7,084	62.6%	4,682	19,312	4,103	12,228		871							210	41,406
Bradford South	WYK	YTH	Lab	Lab	16,328	43.4%	6,450	59.1%	9,878	16,328	9,057	1,094		1,243								37,600
Bradford West	WYK	YTH	Lab	Lab	19,977	49.6%	11,420	63.6%	6,160	19,977	3,140	1,173		1,085							8,755	40,290
Braintree	ESS	E	Con	Con	27,071	53.8%	17,610	68.4%	27,071	9,296	9,461	2,488		1,564							403	50,283
Brecon and Radnorshire	POW	WLS	LD	Con	16,453	41.1%	5,102	73.6%	16,453	5,904	3,338	11,351		1,261		1,767						40,074
Brent Central	LND	LND	LD	Lab	29,216	62.1%	19,649	61.1%	9,567	29,216	1,850	3,937		1,912							550	47,032
Brent North	LND	LND	Lab	Lab	28,351	54.3%	10,834	63.5%	17,517	28,351	2,024	2,607		1,539							197	52,235
Brentford and Isleworth	LND	LND	Con	Lab	25,096	43.8%	465	67.8%	24,631	25,096	3,203	2,305		2,120								57,355
Brentwood and Ongar	ESS	E	Con	Con	30,534	58.8%	21,810	72.2%	30,534	6,492	8,724	4,577		1,397							173	51,897
Bridgend	MGM	WLS	Lab	Lab	14,624	37.1%	1,927	65.8%	12,697	14,624	5,911	1,648		736		2,784					1,053	39,453
Bridgwater and West Somerset	SOM	SW	Con	Con	25,020	46.0%	14,583	67.6%	25,020	9,589	10,437	6,765		2,636								54,447
Brigg and Goole	HUM	YTH	Con	Con	22,946	53.0%	11,176	63.2%	22,946	11,770	6,694	764		915							181	43,270
Brighton Kemptown	SXE	SE	Con	Con	18,428	40.7%	690	66.8%	18,428	17,738	4,446	1,365		3,187							142	45,306
Brighton Pavilion	SXE	SE	Grn	Grn	22,871	41.8%	7,967	71.4%	12,448	14,904	2,724	1,525		22,871							204	54,676
Bristol East	AVN	SW	Lab	Lab	18,148	39.3%	3,980	64.9%	14,168	18,148	7,152	2,689		3,827							229	46,213
Bristol North West	AVN	SW	Con	Con	22,767	43.9%	4,944	69.3%	22,767	17,823	4,889	3,214		2,952							160	51,805
Bristol South	AVN	SW	Lab	Lab	19,505	38.4%	7,128	62.4%	12,377	19,505	8,381	4,416		5,861							302	50,842
Bristol West	AVN	SW	LD	Lab	22,900	35.7%	5,673	70.4%	9,752	22,900	1,940	12,103		17,227							296	64,218
Broadland	NFK	E	Con	Con	26,808	50.5%	16,838	72.2%	26,808	9,970	8,881	5,178		2,252								53,089
Bromley and Chislehurst	LND	LND	Con	Con	23,343	53.0%	13,564	67.3%	23,343	9,779	6,285	2,836		1,823								44,066
Bromsgrove	HWR	WM	Con	Con	28,133	53.8%	16,529	71.2%	28,133	11,604	8,163	2,616		1,729								52,245
Broxbourne	HRT	E	Con	Con	25,797	56.1%	16,723	63.1%	25,797	8,470	9,074	1,467		1,216								46,024
Broxtowe	NTT	EM	Con	Con	24,163	45.2%	4,287	74.5%	24,163	19,876	5,674	2,120		1,544							63	53,440
Buckingham	BKM	SE	Spkr	Spkr	34,617	64.5%	22,942	69.3%			11,675			7,400							34,617	53,692
Burnley	LAN	NW	LD	Lab	14,951	37.6%	3,244	61.6%	5,374	14,951	6,864	11,707		850								39,746
Burton	STS	WM	Con	Con	24,376	49.8%	10,892	65.1%	24,376	13,484	8,658	1,232		1,224								48,974
Bury North	GTM	NW	Con	Con	18,970	41.9%	378	66.9%	18,970	18,592	5,595	932		1,141								45,230
Bury South	GTM	NW	Lab	Lab	21,272	45.1%	4,922	63.9%	16,350	21,272	6,299	1,690		1,434							170	47,215
Bury St Edmunds	SFK	E	Con	Con	31,815	53.6%	21,301	69.0%	31,815	10,514	8,739	3,581		4,692								59,341
Caerphilly	GNT	WLS	Lab	Lab	17,864	44.3%	10,073	63.3%	6,683	17,864	7,791	935		937		5,895					178	40,283
Caithness, Sutherland and Easter Ross	SCT	SCT	LD	SNP	15,831	46.3%	3,844	71.9%	2,326	3,061	981	11,987	15,831									34,186
Calder Valley	WYK	YTH	Con	Con	23,354	43.6%	4,427	68.9%	23,354	18,927	5,950	2,666		2,090							554	53,541
Camberwell and Peckham	LND	LND	Lab	Lab	32,614	63.3%	25,824	62.3%	6,790	32,614	2,413	2,580		5,187							1,977	51,561
Camborne and Redruth	CUL	SW	Con	Con	18,452	40.2%	7,004	68.5%	18,452	11,448	6,776	5,687		2,608							897	45,868
Cambridge	CAM	E	LD	Lab	18,646	36.0%	599	62.1%	8,117	18,646	2,668	18,047		4,109							187	51,774
Cannock Chase	STS	WM	Con	Con	20,811	44.2%	4,923	63.2%	20,811	15,888	8,224	1,270		906								47,099
Canterbury	KEN	SE	Con	Con	22,918	42.9%	9,798	65.7%	22,918	13,120	7,289	6,227		3,746							165	53,465
Cardiff Central	SGM	WLS	LD	Lab	15,462	40.0%	4,981	67.3%	5,674	15,462	2,499	10,481		2,461		1,925					144	38,646
Cardiff North	SGM	WLS	Con	Con	21,709	42.4%	2,137	76.1%	21,709	19,572	3,953	1,953		1,254		2,301					409	51,151
Cardiff South and Penarth	SGM	WLS	Lab	Lab	19,966	42.8%	7,453	61.4%	12,513	19,966	6,423	2,318		1,746		3,443					258	46,667
Cardiff West	SGM	WLS	Lab	Lab	17,803	40.7%	6,789	65.6%	11,014	17,803	4,923	2,069		1,704		6,096					183	43,792
Carlisle	CMA	NW	Con	Con	18,873	44.3%	2,774	64.7%	18,873	16,099	5,277	1,087		1,125							126	42,587
Carmarthen East and Dinefwr	DFD	WLS	PC	PC	15,140	38.4%	5,599	70.7%	8,336	9,541	4,363	928		1,091		15,140						39,399
Carmarthen West and South Pembrokeshire	DFD	WLS	Con	Con	17,626	43.7%	6,054	69.9%	17,626	11,572	4,698	963		1,290		4,201						40,350
Carshalton and Wallington	LND	LND	LD	LD	16,603	34.9%	1,510	68.0%	15,093	7,150	7,049	16,603		1,492							226	47,613
Castle Point	ESS	E	Con	Con	23,112	50.9%	8,934	66.7%	23,112	6,283	14,178	801		1,076								45,450
Central Ayrshire	SCT	SCT	Lab	SNP	26,999	53.2%	13,589	72.5%	8,803	13,410		917	26,999	645								50,774
Central Devon	DEV	SW	Con	Con	28,436	52.2%	21,265	74.9%	28,436	6,985	7,171	6,643		4,866							347	54,448
Central Suffolk and North Ipswich	SFK	E	Con	Con	30,317	56.1%	20,144	70.6%	30,317	10,173	7,459	3,314		2,664							162	54,089
Ceredigion	DFD	WLS	LD	LD	13,414	35.9%	3,067	69.0%	4,123	3,615	3,829	13,414		2,088		10,347						37,416
Charnwood	LEI	EM	Con	Con	28,384	54.3%	16,931	67.6%	28,384	11,453	8,330	3,605									489	52,261
Chatham and Aylesford	KEN	SE	Con	Con	21,614	50.2%	11,455	64.9%	21,614	10,159	8,581	1,360		1,101							258	43,073
Cheadle	GTM	NW	LD	Con	22,889	43.1%	6,453	72.5%	22,889	8,673	4,423	16,436									674	53,095
Chelmsford	ESS	E	Con	Con	27,732	51.5%	18,250	68.5%	27,732	9,482	7,652	6,394		1,892							665	53,817
Chelsea and Fulham	LND	LND	Con	Con	25,322	62.9%	16,022	63.4%	25,322	9,300	2,039	2,091		1,474								40,226
Cheltenham	GLS	SW	LD	Con	24,790	46.1%	6,516	69.5%	24,790	3,902	3,808	18,274		2,689							272	53,735
Chesham and Amersham	BKM	SE	Con	Con	31,138	59.1%	23,920	72.7%	31,138	6,712	7,218	4,761		2,901								52,730
Chesterfield	DBY	EM	Lab	Lab	21,829	47.9%	13,598	63.6%	8,231	21,829	7,523	6,301		1,352							331	45,567
Chichester	WSX	SE	Con	Con	32,953	57.7%	24,413	68.5%	32,953	6,933	8,540	4,865		3,742							106	57,139
Chingford and Woodford Green	LND	LND	Con	Con	20,999	47.9%	8,386	65.7%	20,999	12,613	5,644	2,400		1,854							294	43,804
Chippenham	WIL	SW	LD	Con	26,354	47.6%	10,076	74.7%	26,354	4,561	5,884	16,278		2,330								55,407
Chipping Barnet	LND	LND	Con	Con	25,759	48.6%	7,656	68.1%	25,759	18,103	4,151	2,381		2,501							118	53,013
Chorley	LAN	NW	Lab	Lab	23,322	45.1%	4,530	69.2%	18,792	23,322	6,995	1,354		1,111							138	51,712
Christchurch	DOR	SW	Con	Con	28,887	58.1%	18,224	71.7%	28,887	4,745	10,663	3,263		2,149								49,707
Cities of London and Westminster	LND	LND	Con	Con	19,570	54.1%	9,671	59.3%	19,570	9,899	1,894	2,521		1,953							348	36,185
City of Chester	CHS	NW	Con	Lab	22,118	43.2%	93	68.7%	22,025	22,118	4,148	2,870										51,161
City of Durham	DUR	NE	Lab	Lab	21,596	47.3%	11,439	66.5%	10,157	21,596	5,232	5,153		2,687							844	45,669
Clacton	ESS	E	Con	UKIP	19,642	44.4%	3,437	64.1%	16,205	6,364	19,642	812		1,184								44,207
Cleethorpes	HUM	YTH	Con	Con	21,026	46.6%	7,893	63.5%	21,026	13,133	8,356	1,346		1,013							215	45,089
Clwyd South	CON	WLS	Lab	Lab	13,051	37.2%	2,402	63.8%	10,649	13,051	5,480	1,349		915		3,620						35,064
Clwyd West	CON	WLS	Con	Con	16,463	43.3%	6,730	64.8%	16,463	9,733	4,988	1,387				4,651					806	38,028
Coatbridge, Chryston and Bellshill	SCT	SCT	Lab	SNP	28,696	56.6%	11,501	68.6%	3,209	17,195	1,049	549	28,696									50,698
Colchester	ESS	E	LD	Con	18,919	38.9%	5,575	65.5%	18,919	7,852	5,870	13,344		2,499							109	48,593
Colne Valley	WYK	YTH	Con	Con	25,246	44.4%	5,378	68.8%	25,246	19,868	5,734	3,407		1,919							626	56,800
Congleton	CHS	NW	Con	Con	27,164	53.3%	16,773	70.3%	27,164	10,391	6,922	4,623		1,876								50,976
Copeland	CMA	NW	Lab	Lab	16,750	42.3%	2,564	63.8%	14,186	16,750	6,148	1,368		1,179								39,631
Corby	NTH	EM	Con	Con	24,023	42.8%	2,412	70.4%	24,023	21,611	7,708	1,458		1,374								56,174
Coventry North East	WMD	WM	Lab	Lab	22,025	52.2%	12,274	56.0%	9,751	22,025	6,278	2,007		1,245							925	42,231
Coventry North West	WMD	WM	Lab	Lab	18,557	41.0%	4,509	61.5%	14,048	18,557	7,101	1,810		1,961							1,769	45,246
Coventry South	WMD	WM	Lab	Lab	18,472	42.3%	3,188	62.1%	15,284	18,472	5,709	1,779		1,719							736	43,699
Crawley	WSX	SE	Con	Con	22,829	47.0%	6,526	65.7%	22,829	16,303	6,979	1,339		1,100								48,550
Crewe and Nantwich	CHS	NW	Con	Con	22,445	45.0%	3,620	67.3%	22,445	18,825	7,252	1,374										49,896
Croydon Central	LND	LND	Con	Con	22,753	43.0%	165	67.7%	22,753	22,588	4,810	1,152		1,454							184	52,941
Croydon North	LND	LND	Lab	Lab	33,513	62.6%	21,364	62.3%	12,149	33,513	2,899	1,919		2,515							527	53,522
Croydon South	LND	LND	Con	Con	31,448	54.5%	17,140	70.4%	31,448	14,308	6,068	3,448		2,154							286	57,712
Cumbernauld, Kilsyth and Kirkintilloch East	SCT	SCT	Lab	SNP	29,572	59.9%	14,752	73.6%	3,891	14,820		1,099	29,572									49,382
Cynon Valley	MGM	WLS	Lab	Lab	14,532	47.7%	9,406	59.3%	3,676	14,532	4,976	830		799		5,126					533	30,472
Dagenham and Rainham	LND	LND	Lab	Lab	17,830	41.4%	4,980	62.3%	10,492	17,830	12,850	717		806							355	43,050
Darlington	DUR	NE	Lab	Lab	17,637	42.9%	3,158	62.5%	14,479	17,637	5,392	1,966		1,444							223	41,141
Dartford	KEN	SE	Con	Con	25,670	49.0%	12,345	69.7%	25,670	13,325	10,434	1,454		1,324							211	52,418
Daventry	NTH	EM	Con	Con	30,550	58.2%	21,059	72.1%	30,550	9,491	8,296	2,352		1,829								52,518
Delyn	CON	WLS	Lab	Lab	15,187	40.5%	2,930	69.8%	12,257	15,187	6,150	1,380		680		1,803						37,457
Denton and Reddish	GTM	NW	Lab	Lab	19,661	50.8%	10,511	58.5%	9,150	19,661	7,225	957		1,466							222	38,681
Derby North	DBY	EM	Lab	Con	16,402	36.7%	41	64.1%	16,402	16,361	6,532	3,832		1,618								44,745
Derby South	DBY	EM	Lab	Lab	20,007	49.0%	8,828	58.1%	11,179	20,007	6,341	1,717		1,208							368	40,820
Derbyshire Dales	DBY	EM	Con	Con	24,805	52.4%	14,044	74.6%	24,805	10,761	5,508	3,965		2,173							149	47,361
Devizes	WIL	SW	Con	Con	28,295	57.7%	20,751	70.8%	28,295	6,360	7,544	3,954		2,853								49,006
Dewsbury	WYK	YTH	Con	Lab	22,406	41.8%	1,451	67.2%	20,955	22,406	6,649	1,924		1,366							330	53,630
Don Valley	SYK	YTH	Lab	Lab	19,621	46.2%	8,885	59.6%	10,736	19,621	9,963	1,487									679	42,486
Doncaster Central	SYK	YTH	Lab	Lab	19,840	49.1%	10,093	56.8%	8,386	19,840	9,747	1,717									730	40,420
Doncaster North	SYK	YTH	Lab	Lab	20,708	52.4%	11,780	55.6%	7,235	20,708	8,928	1,005		757							868	39,501
Dover	KEN	SE	Con	Con	21,737	43.3%	6,294	68.9%	21,737	15,443	10,177	1,572		1,295								50,224
Dudley North	WMD	WM	Lab	Lab	15,885	41.8%	4,181	62.6%	11,704	15,885	9,113	478		517							295	37,992
Dudley South	WMD	WM	Con	Con	16,723	43.8%	4,270	63.3%	16,723	12,453	7,236	828		970								38,210
Dulwich and West Norwood	LND	LND	Lab	Lab	27,772	54.1%	16,122	67.1%	11,650	27,772	1,606	5,055		4,844							435	51,362
Dumfries and Galloway	SCT	SCT	Lab	SNP	23,440	41.4%	6,514	75.2%	16,926	13,982	1,301	953	23,440									56,602
Dumfriesshire, Clydesdale and Tweeddale	SCT	SCT	Con	Con	20,759	39.8%	798	76.1%	20,759	7,711	1,472	1,392	19,961	839								52,134
Dundee East	SCT	SCT	SNP	SNP	28,765	59.7%	19,162	71.0%	7,206	9,603		1,387	28,765	895							329	48,185
Dundee West	SCT	SCT	Lab	SNP	27,684	61.9%	17,092	67.8%	3,852	10,592		1,057	27,684	1,225							304	44,714
Dunfermline and West Fife	SCT	SCT	Lab	SNP	28,096	50.3%	10,352	71.6%	6,623	17,744		2,232	28,096	1,195								55,890
Dwyfor Meirionnydd	GWN	WLS	PC	PC	11,811	40.9%	5,261	65.1%	6,550	3,904	3,126	1,153		981		11,811					1,388	28,913
Ealing Central and Acton	LND	LND	Con	Lab	22,002	43.2%	274	71.3%	21,728	22,002	1,926	3,106		1,841							291	50,894
Ealing North	LND	LND	Lab	Lab	26,745	55.1%	12,326	65.7%	14,419	26,745	3,922	1,575		1,635							214	48,510
Ealing Southall	LND	LND	Lab	Lab	28,147	65.0%	18,760	66.0%	9,387	28,147	1,769	1,550		2,007							461	43,321
Easington	DUR	NE	Lab	Lab	21,132	61.0%	14,641	56.2%	4,478	21,132	6,491	834		733							956	34,624
East Antrim	NIR	NIR	DUP	DUP	12,103	36.1%	5,795	53.3%	549		3,660				12,103		2,314	6,308	1,639	5,021	1,903	33,497
East Devon	DEV	SW	Con	Con	25,401	46.4%	12,261	71.5%	25,401	5,591	6,870	3,715									13,140	54,717
East Dunbartonshire	SCT	SCT	LD	SNP	22,093	40.3%	2,167	81.9%	4,727	6,754	567	19,926	22,093	804								54,871
East Ham	LND	LND	Lab	Lab	40,563	77.6%	34,252	59.8%	6,311	40,563	2,622	856		1,299							639	52,290
East Hampshire	HAM	SE	Con	Con	31,334	60.7%	25,147	72.7%	31,334	5,220	6,187	5,732		3,176								51,649
East Kilbride, Strathaven and Lesmahagow	SCT	SCT	Lab	SNP	33,678	55.6%	16,527	72.8%	7,129	17,151	1,221	1,042	33,678								318	60,539
East Londonderry	NIR	NIR	DUP	DUP	14,663	42.2%	7,804	51.9%	422						14,663		6,859	5,333	4,268	2,642	527	34,714
East Lothian	SCT	SCT	Lab	SNP	25,104	42.5%	6,803	74.2%	11,511	18,301	1,178	1,517	25,104	1,245							158	59,014
East Renfrewshire	SCT	SCT	Lab	SNP	23,013	40.6%	3,718	81.1%	12,465	19,295	888	1,069	23,013									56,730
East Surrey	SRY	SE	Con	Con	32,211	57.4%	22,658	70.4%	32,211	6,627	9,553	5,189		2,159							364	56,103
East Worthing and Shoreham	WSX	SE	Con	Con	24,686	49.5%	14,949	66.7%	24,686	9,737	8,267	3,360		2,605							1,243	49,898
East Yorkshire	HUM	YTH	Con	Con	25,276	50.6%	14,933	61.7%	25,276	10,343	8,955	2,966		1,731							720	49,991
Eastbourne	SXE	SE	LD	Con	20,934	39.6%	733	67.6%	20,934	4,143	6,139	20,201		1,351							139	52,907
Eastleigh	HAM	SE	LD	Con	23,464	42.3%	9,147	69.7%	23,464	7,181	8,783	14,317		1,513							247	55,505
Eddisbury	CHS	NW	Con	Con	24,167	51.0%	12,974	69.1%	24,167	11,193	5,778	4,289		1,624							301	47,352
Edinburgh East	SCT	SCT	Lab	SNP	23,188	49.2%	9,106	70.1%	4,670	14,082	898	1,325	23,188	2,809							117	47,089
Edinburgh North and Leith	SCT	SCT	Lab	SNP	23,742	40.9%	5,597	71.7%	9,378	18,145	847	2,634	23,742	3,140							122	58,008
Edinburgh South	SCT	SCT	Lab	Lab	19,293	39.1%	2,637	74.9%	8,626	19,293	601	1,823	16,656	2,090							197	49,286
Edinburgh South West	SCT	SCT	Lab	SNP	22,168	43.0%	8,135	71.5%	10,444	14,033	1,072	1,920	22,168	1,965								51,602
Edinburgh West	SCT	SCT	LD	SNP	21,378	39.0%	3,210	76.5%	6,732	6,425	1,015	18,168	21,378	1,140								54,858
Edmonton	LND	LND	Lab	Lab	25,388	61.4%	15,419	62.6%	9,969	25,388	3,366	897		1,358							360	41,338
Ellesmere Port and Neston	CHS	NW	Lab	Lab	22,316	47.8%	6,275	67.5%	16,041	22,316	5,594	1,563		990							223	46,727
Elmet and Rothwell	WYK	YTH	Con	Con	27,978	48.4%	8,490	73.0%	27,978	19,488	6,430	2,640		1,261								57,797
Eltham	LND	LND	Lab	Lab	18,393	42.6%	2,693	67.4%	15,700	18,393	6,481	1,308		1,275								43,157
Enfield North	LND	LND	Con	Lab	20,172	43.7%	1,086	67.7%	19,086	20,172	4,133	1,059		1,303							384	46,137
Enfield Southgate	LND	LND	Con	Con	22,624	49.4%	4,753	70.5%	22,624	17,871	2,109	1,518		1,690								45,812
Epping Forest	ESS	E	Con	Con	27,027	54.8%	17,978	67.2%	27,027	7,962	9,049	3,448		1,782							80	49,348
Epsom and Ewell	SRY	SE	Con	Con	33,309	58.3%	24,443	72.7%	33,309	8,866	7,117	5,002		2,116							733	57,143
Erewash	DBY	EM	Con	Con	20,636	42.7%	3,584	67.2%	20,636	17,052	7,792	1,658		1,184								48,322
Erith and Thamesmead	LND	LND	Lab	Lab	21,209	49.8%	9,525	60.5%	11,684	21,209	7,368	972		941							443	42,617
Esher and Walton	SRY	SE	Con	Con	35,845	62.9%	28,616	71.3%	35,845	7,229	5,551	5,372		2,355							624	56,976
Exeter	DEV	SW	Lab	Lab	25,062	46.4%	7,183	70.2%	17,879	25,062	5,075	2,321		3,491							190	54,018
Falkirk	SCT	SCT	Lab	SNP	34,831	57.7%	19,701	72.4%	7,325	15,130	1,829	1,225	34,831									60,340
Fareham	HAM	SE	Con	Con	30,689	56.1%	22,262	70.9%	30,689	7,800	8,427	4,814		2,129							841	54,700
Faversham and Mid Kent	KEN	SE	Con	Con	24,895	54.4%	16,652	65.9%	24,895	7,403	8,243	3,039		1,768							455	45,803
Feltham and Heston	LND	LND	Lab	Lab	25,845	52.3%	11,463	60.0%	14,382	25,845	6,209	1,579		1,390								49,405
Fermanagh and South Tyrone	NIR	NIR	SF	UUP	23,608	46.4%	530	72.6%						788			23,078	23,608	2,732	658		50,864
Filton and Bradley Stoke	AVN	SW	Con	Con	22,920	46.7%	9,838	68.9%	22,920	13,082	7,261	3,581		2,257								49,101
Finchley and Golders Green	LND	LND	Con	Con	25,835	50.9%	5,662	70.0%	25,835	20,173	1,732	1,662		1,357								50,759
Folkestone and Hythe	KEN	SE	Con	Con	26,323	47.9%	13,797	65.8%	26,323	7,939	12,526	4,882		2,956							384	55,010
Forest of Dean	GLS	SW	Con	Con	23,191	46.8%	10,987	70.9%	23,191	12,204	8,792	2,630		2,703								49,520
Foyle	NIR	NIR	SDLP	SDLP	17,725	47.9%	6,046	52.8%	132		832				4,573		11,679	1,226	17,725	835		37,002
Fylde	LAN	NW	Con	Con	21,406	49.1%	13,224	66.3%	21,406	8,182	5,569	1,623		1,381							5,396	43,557
Gainsborough	LIN	EM	Con	Con	25,949	52.7%	15,449	66.0%	25,949	10,500	7,727	3,290		1,290							505	49,261
Garston and Halewood	MSY	NW	Lab	Lab	33,839	69.1%	27,146	66.4%	6,693	33,839	4,482	2,279		1,690								48,983
Gateshead	TWR	NE	Lab	Lab	21,549	56.8%	14,784	58.8%	5,502	21,549	6,765	2,585		1,548								37,949
Gedling	NTT	EM	Lab	Lab	20,307	42.3%	2,986	68.6%	17,321	20,307	6,930	1,906		1,534								47,998
Gillingham and Rainham	KEN	SE	Con	Con	22,590	48.0%	10,530	66.3%	22,590	12,060	9,199	1,707		1,133							389	47,078
Glasgow Central	SCT	SCT	Lab	SNP	20,658	52.5%	7,662	55.4%	2,359	12,996	786	612	20,658	1,559							348	39,318
Glasgow East	SCT	SCT	Lab	SNP	24,116	56.9%	10,387	60.3%	2,544	13,729	1,105	318	24,116	381							224	42,417
Glasgow North	SCT	SCT	Lab	SNP	19,610	53.1%	9,295	61.4%	2,901	10,315	486	1,012	19,610	2,284							314	36,922
Glasgow North East	SCT	SCT	Lab	SNP	21,976	58.1%	9,222	56.8%	1,769	12,754		300	21,976	615							443	37,857
Glasgow North West	SCT	SCT	Lab	SNP	23,908	54.5%	10,364	64.1%	3,692	13,544		1,194	23,908	1,167							349	43,854
Glasgow South	SCT	SCT	Lab	SNP	26,773	54.9%	12,269	65.9%	4,752	14,504		1,019	26,773	1,431							299	48,778
Glasgow South West	SCT	SCT	Lab	SNP	23,388	57.2%	9,950	61.8%	2,036	13,438	970	406	23,388	507							176	40,921
Glenrothes	SCT	SCT	Lab	SNP	28,459	59.8%	13,897	68.2%	3,685	14,562		892	28,459									47,598
Gloucester	GLS	SW	Con	Con	23,837	45.3%	7,251	63.4%	23,837	16,586	7,497	2,828		1,485							342	52,575
Gordon	SCT	SCT	LD	SNP	27,717	47.7%	8,687	73.3%	6,807	3,441	1,166	19,030	27,717									58,161
Gosport	HAM	SE	Con	Con	26,364	55.3%	17,098	65.1%	26,364	6,926	9,266	3,298		1,707							104	47,665
Gower	WGM	WLS	Lab	Con	15,862	37.1%	27	69.2%	15,862	15,835	4,773	1,552		1,161		3,051					524	42,758
Grantham and Stamford	LIN	EM	Con	Con	28,399	52.8%	18,989	66.2%	28,399	9,070	9,410	3,263		1,872							1,741	53,755
Gravesham	KEN	SE	Con	Con	23,484	46.8%	8,370	69.6%	23,484	15,114	9,306	1,111		1,124								50,139
Great Grimsby	HUM	YTH	Lab	Lab	13,414	39.8%	4,540	57.0%	8,874	13,414	8,417	1,680		783							563	33,731
Great Yarmouth	NFK	E	Con	Con	19,089	42.9%	6,154	63.7%	19,089	12,935	10,270	1,030		978							167	44,469
Greenwich and Woolwich	LND	LND	Lab	Lab	24,384	52.2%	11,946	63.7%	12,438	24,384	3,888	2,645		2,991							370	46,716
Guildford	SRY	SE	Con	Con	30,802	57.1%	22,448	71.3%	30,802	6,534	4,774	8,354		2,558							964	53,986
Hackney North and Stoke Newington	LND	LND	Lab	Lab	31,357	62.9%	24,008	56.6%	7,349	31,357	1,085	2,492		7,281							323	49,887
Hackney South and Shoreditch	LND	LND	Lab	Lab	30,633	64.4%	24,213	56.0%	6,420	30,633	1,818	2,186		5,519							1,004	47,580
Halesowen and Rowley Regis	WMD	WM	Con	Con	18,933	43.2%	3,082	66.3%	18,933	15,851	7,280	905		849								43,818
Halifax	WYK	YTH	Lab	Lab	17,506	40.0%	428	62.1%	17,078	17,506	5,621	1,629		1,142							777	43,753
Haltemprice and Howden	HUM	YTH	Con	Con	26,414	54.2%	16,195	68.5%	26,414	10,219	6,781	3,055		1,809							479	48,757
Halton	CHS	NW	Lab	Lab	28,292	62.8%	20,285	61.8%	8,007	28,292	6,333	1,097		1,017							277	45,023
Hammersmith	LND	LND	Lab	Lab	23,981	50.0%	6,518	66.4%	17,463	23,981	2,105	2,224		2,105							82	47,960
Hampstead and Kilburn	LND	LND	Lab	Lab	23,977	44.4%	1,138	67.3%	22,839	23,977	1,532	3,039		2,387							190	53,964
Harborough	LEI	EM	Con	Con	27,675	52.7%	19,632	67.5%	27,675	8,043	7,539	7,037		2,177								52,471
Harlow	ESS	E	Con	Con	21,623	48.9%	8,350	65.1%	21,623	13,273	7,208	904		954							289	44,251
Harrogate and Knaresborough	NYK	YTH	Con	Con	28,153	52.7%	16,371	69.9%	28,153	5,409	5,681	11,782		2,351								53,376
Harrow East	LND	LND	Con	Con	24,668	50.3%	4,757	69.0%	24,668	19,911	2,333	1,037		846							205	49,000
Harrow West	LND	LND	Lab	Lab	21,885	47.0%	2,208	66.9%	19,677	21,885	2,047	1,567		1,310							117	46,603
Hartlepool	CLV	NE	Lab	Lab	14,076	35.6%	3,024	56.5%	8,256	14,076	11,052	761		1,341							4,004	39,490
Harwich and North Essex	ESS	E	Con	Con	24,722	51.0%	15,174	69.9%	24,722	9,548	8,464	3,576		2,122								48,432
Hastings and Rye	SXE	SE	Con	Con	22,686	44.5%	4,796	67.8%	22,686	17,890	6,786	1,614		1,951								50,927
Havant	HAM	SE	Con	Con	23,159	51.7%	13,920	63.5%	23,159	7,149	9,239	2,929		2,352								44,828
Hayes and Harlington	LND	LND	Lab	Lab	26,843	59.6%	15,700	60.2%	11,143	26,843	5,388	888		794								45,056
Hazel Grove	GTM	NW	LD	Con	17,882	41.4%	6,552	68.5%	17,882	7,584	5,283	11,330		1,140								43,219
Hemel Hempstead	HRT	E	Con	Con	26,245	52.9%	14,420	66.5%	26,245	11,825	7,249	2,402		1,660							252	49,633
Hemsworth	WYK	YTH	Lab	Lab	21,772	51.3%	12,078	58.3%	9,694	21,772	8,565	1,357									1,018	42,406
Hendon	LND	LND	Con	Con	24,328	49.0%	3,724	65.9%	24,328	20,604	2,595	1,088		1,015								49,630
Henley	OXF	SE	Con	Con	32,292	58.5%	25,375	70.9%	32,292	6,917	6,007	6,205		3,815								55,236
Hereford and South Herefordshire	HWR	WM	Con	Con	24,844	52.6%	16,890	66.1%	24,844	6,042	7,954	5,002		3,415								47,257
Hertford and Stortford	HRT	E	Con	Con	31,593	56.1%	21,509	69.8%	31,593	10,084	7,534	4,385		2,681								56,277
Hertsmere	HRT	E	Con	Con	29,696	59.3%	18,461	67.9%	29,696	11,235	6,383	2,777										50,091
Hexham	NBL	NE	Con	Con	22,834	52.7%	12,031	72.6%	22,834	10,803	4,302	2,961		2,445								43,345
Heywood and Middleton	GTM	NW	Lab	Lab	20,926	43.1%	5,299	60.7%	9,268	20,926	15,627	1,607		1,110								48,538
High Peak	DBY	EM	Con	Con	22,836	45.0%	4,894	69.3%	22,836	17,942	5,811	2,389		1,811								50,789
Hitchin and Harpenden	HRT	E	Con	Con	31,488	56.9%	20,055	68.9%	31,488	11,433	4,917	4,484		3,053								55,375
Holborn and St Pancras	LND	LND	Lab	Lab	29,062	52.9%	17,048	63.3%	12,014	29,062	2,740	3,555		7,013							533	54,917
Hornchurch and Upminster	LND	LND	Con	Con	27,051	49.0%	13,074	69.6%	27,051	11,103	13,977	1,501		1,411							193	55,236
Hornsey and Wood Green	LND	LND	LD	Lab	29,417	50.9%	11,058	72.9%	5,347	29,417	1,271	18,359		3,146							245	57,785
Horsham	WSX	SE	Con	Con	32,627	57.3%	24,658	72.0%	32,627	6,499	7,969	6,647		2,198							985	56,925
Houghton and Sunderland South	TWR	NE	Lab	Lab	21,218	55.1%	12,938	56.3%	7,105	21,218	8,280	791		1,095								38,489
Hove	SXE	SE	Con	Lab	22,082	42.3%	1,236	71.0%	20,846	22,082	3,265	1,861		3,569							591	52,214
Huddersfield	WYK	YTH	Lab	Lab	18,186	44.9%	7,345	62.0%	10,841	18,186	5,948	2,365		2,798							340	40,478
Huntingdon	CAM	E	Con	Con	29,652	53.0%	19,403	67.7%	29,652	10,249	9,473	4,375		2,178								55,927
Hyndburn	LAN	NW	Lab	Lab	18,076	42.1%	4,400	62.8%	13,676	18,076	9,154	859		1,122								42,887
Ilford North	LND	LND	Con	Lab	21,463	43.9%	589	65.0%	20,874	21,463	4,355	1,130		1,023							87	48,932
Ilford South	LND	LND	Lab	Lab	33,232	64.0%	19,777	56.4%	13,455	33,232	2,705	1,014		1,506								51,912
Inverclyde	SCT	SCT	Lab	SNP	24,585	55.1%	11,063	75.2%	4,446	13,522	715	1,106	24,585								233	44,607
Inverness, Nairn, Badenoch and Strathspey	SCT	SCT	LD	SNP	28,838	50.1%	10,809	74.2%	3,410	4,311	1,236	18,029	28,838	1,367							422	57,613
Ipswich	SFK	E	Con	Con	21,794	44.8%	3,733	65.4%	21,794	18,061	5,703	1,400		1,736								48,694
Isle of Wight	IOW	SE	Con	Con	28,591	40.7%	13,703	64.6%	28,591	8,984	14,888	5,235		9,404							3,198	70,300
Islington North	LND	LND	Lab	Lab	29,659	60.2%	21,194	67.1%	8,465	29,659	1,971	3,984		5,043							112	49,234
Islington South and Finsbury	LND	LND	Lab	Lab	22,547	50.9%	12,708	65.0%	9,839	22,547	3,375	4,829		3,371							309	44,270
Islwyn	GNT	WLS	Lab	Lab	17,336	49.0%	10,404	63.6%	5,366	17,336	6,932	950		659		3,794					364	35,401
Jarrow	TWR	NE	Lab	Lab	21,464	55.7%	13,881	60.3%	6,584	21,464	7,583	1,238		1,310							385	38,564
Keighley	WYK	YTH	Con	Con	21,766	44.3%	3,053	71.3%	21,766	18,713	5,662	1,321		1,661								49,123
Kenilworth and Southam	WAR	WM	Con	Con	28,474	58.4%	21,002	76.3%	28,474	7,472	5,467	4,913		1,956							509	48,791
Kensington	LND	LND	Con	Con	18,199	52.3%	7,361	57.0%	18,199	10,838	1,557	1,962		1,765							507	34,828
Kettering	NTH	EM	Con	Con	24,467	51.8%	12,590	67.3%	24,467	11,877	7,600	1,490		1,633							151	47,218
Kilmarnock and Loudoun	SCT	SCT	Lab	SNP	30,000	55.7%	13,638	71.6%	6,752	16,362		789	30,000									53,903
Kingston and Surbiton	LND	LND	LD	Con	23,249	39.2%	2,834	72.9%	23,249	8,574	4,321	20,415		2,322							372	59,253
Kingston upon Hull East	HUM	YTH	Lab	Lab	18,180	51.7%	10,319	53.5%	5,593	18,180	7,861	2,294		806							410	35,144
Kingston upon Hull North	HUM	YTH	Lab	Lab	18,661	52.8%	12,899	55.1%	5,306	18,661	5,762	3,175		2,066							366	35,336
Kingston upon Hull West and Hessle	HUM	YTH	Lab	Lab	15,646	49.2%	9,333	53.8%	5,561	15,646	6,313	3,169		943							171	31,803
Kingswood	AVN	SW	Con	Con	23,252	48.3%	9,006	70.6%	23,252	14,246	7,133	1,827		1,370							297	48,125
Kirkcaldy and Cowdenbeath	SCT	SCT	Lab	SNP	27,628	52.2%	9,974	69.6%	5,223	17,654	1,237	1,150	27,628									52,892
Knowsley	MSY	NW	Lab	Lab	39,628	78.1%	34,655	64.1%	3,367	39,628	4,973	1,490		1,270								50,728
Lagan Valley	NIR	NIR	DUP	DUP	19,055	47.9%	13,000	55.9%	654		2,200				19,055		1,144	6,055	2,500	5,544	2,643	39,795
Lanark and Hamilton East	SCT	SCT	Lab	SNP	26,976	48.8%	10,100	69.1%	8,772	16,876	1,431	1,203	26,976									55,258
Lancaster and Fleetwood	LAN	NW	Con	Lab	17,643	42.3%	1,265	67.4%	16,378	17,643	4,060	1,390		2,093							174	41,738
Leeds Central	WYK	YTH	Lab	Lab	24,758	55.0%	16,967	55.1%	7,791	24,758	7,082	1,529		3,558							330	45,048
Leeds East	WYK	YTH	Lab	Lab	20,530	53.7%	12,533	59.0%	7,997	20,530	7,256	1,296		1,117								38,196
Leeds North East	WYK	YTH	Lab	Lab	23,137	47.9%	7,250	69.9%	15,887	23,137	3,706	2,569		2,541							451	48,291
Leeds North West	WYK	YTH	LD	LD	15,948	36.8%	2,907	70.0%	8,083	13,041	2,997	15,948		3,042							246	43,357
Leeds West	WYK	YTH	Lab	Lab	18,456	48.0%	10,727	59.2%	7,729	18,456	7,104	1,495		3,217							422	38,423
Leicester East	LEI	EM	Lab	Lab	29,386	61.1%	18,352	63.7%	11,034	29,386	4,290	1,233		1,468							657	48,068
Leicester South	LEI	EM	Lab	Lab	27,473	59.8%	17,845	62.5%	9,628	27,473	3,832	2,127		2,533							349	45,942
Leicester West	LEI	EM	Lab	Lab	16,051	46.5%	7,203	54.6%	8,848	16,051	5,950	1,507		1,878							288	34,522
Leigh	GTM	NW	Lab	Lab	24,312	53.9%	14,096	59.4%	10,216	24,312	8,903	1,150									542	45,123
Lewes	SXE	SE	LD	Con	19,206	38.0%	1,083	72.7%	19,206	5,000	5,427	18,123		2,784								50,540
Lewisham Deptford	LND	LND	Lab	Lab	28,572	60.2%	21,516	64.6%	7,056	28,572	2,013	2,497		5,932							1,356	47,426
Lewisham East	LND	LND	Lab	Lab	23,907	55.7%	14,333	64.1%	9,574	23,907	3,886	2,455		2,429							672	42,923
Lewisham West and Penge	LND	LND	Lab	Lab	24,347	50.6%	12,714	66.6%	11,633	24,347	3,764	3,709		4,077							595	48,125
Leyton and Wanstead	LND	LND	Lab	Lab	23,856	58.6%	14,917	63.0%	8,939	23,856	2,341	2,304		2,974							289	40,703
Lichfield	STS	WM	Con	Con	28,389	55.2%	18,189	69.3%	28,389	10,200	8,082	2,700		1,976							120	51,467
Lincoln	LIN	EM	Con	Con	19,976	42.6%	1,443	63.2%	19,976	18,533	5,721	1,992									630	46,852
Linlithgow and East Falkirk	SCT	SCT	Lab	SNP	32,055	52.0%	12,934	70.8%	7,384	19,121	1,682	1,252	32,055								103	61,597
Liverpool Riverside	MSY	NW	Lab	Lab	29,835	67.4%	24,463	62.5%	4,245	29,835	2,510	1,719		5,372							582	44,263
Liverpool Walton	MSY	NW	Lab	Lab	31,222	81.3%	27,777	62.0%	1,802	31,222	3,445	899		956							79	38,403
Liverpool Wavertree	MSY	NW	Lab	Lab	28,401	69.3%	24,303	66.6%	4,098	28,401	3,375	2,454		2,140							506	40,974
Liverpool West Derby	MSY	NW	Lab	Lab	30,842	75.2%	27,367	64.5%	2,710	30,842	3,475	959		996							2,049	41,031
Livingston	SCT	SCT	Lab	SNP	32,736	56.9%	16,843	69.9%	5,929	15,893	1,757	1,232	32,736									57,547
Llanelli	DFD	WLS	Lab	Lab	15,948	41.3%	7,095	65.0%	5,534	15,948	6,269	751		689		8,853					530	38,574
Loughborough	LEI	EM	Con	Con	25,762	49.5%	9,183	69.2%	25,762	16,579	5,704	2,130		1,845								52,020
Louth and Horncastle	LIN	EM	Con	Con	25,755	51.2%	14,977	67.2%	25,755	9,077	10,778	2,255		1,549							922	50,336
Ludlow	SAL	WM	Con	Con	26,093	54.3%	18,929	72.4%	26,093	5,902	7,164	6,469		2,435								48,063
Luton North	BDF	E	Lab	Lab	22,243	52.2%	9,504	63.2%	12,739	22,243	5,318	1,299		972								42,571
Luton South	BDF	E	Lab	Lab	18,660	44.2%	5,711	62.3%	12,949	18,660	5,129	3,183		1,237							1,058	42,216
Macclesfield	CHS	NW	Con	Con	26,063	52.5%	14,811	69.2%	26,063	11,252	6,037	3,842		2,404								49,598
Maidenhead	BRK	SE	Con	Con	35,453	65.8%	29,059	72.6%	35,453	6,394	4,539	5,337		1,915							217	53,855
Maidstone and The Weald	KEN	SE	Con	Con	22,745	45.5%	10,709	68.3%	22,745	5,268	7,930	12,036		1,396							635	50,010
Makerfield	GTM	NW	Lab	Lab	23,208	51.8%	13,155	60.3%	8,752	23,208	10,053	1,639		1,136								44,788
Maldon	ESS	E	Con	Con	29,112	60.6%	22,070	69.6%	29,112	5,690	7,042	2,157		1,504							2,540	48,045
Manchester Central	GTM	NW	Lab	Lab	27,772	61.3%	21,639	52.7%	6,133	27,772	5,033	1,867		3,838							688	45,331
Manchester Gorton	GTM	NW	Lab	Lab	28,187	67.1%	24,079	57.6%	4,063	28,187	3,434	1,782		4,108							445	42,019
Manchester Withington	GTM	NW	LD	Lab	26,843	53.7%	14,873	67.4%	4,872	26,843	2,172	11,970		4,048							61	49,966
Mansfield	NTT	EM	Lab	Lab	18,603	39.4%	5,315	60.9%	13,288	18,603	11,850	1,642		1,486							324	47,193
Meon Valley	HAM	SE	Con	Con	31,578	61.1%	23,913	71.1%	31,578	5,656	7,665	4,987		1,831								51,717
Meriden	WMD	WM	Con	Con	28,791	54.7%	18,795	64.2%	28,791	9,996	8,908	2,638		2,170							100	52,603
Merthyr Tydfil and Rhymney	GNT	WLS	Lab	Lab	17,619	53.9%	11,513	53.0%	3,292	17,619	6,106	1,351		603		3,099					645	32,715
Mid Bedfordshire	BDF	E	Con	Con	32,544	56.1%	23,327	74.0%	32,544	9,217	8,966	4,193		2,462							678	58,060
Mid Derbyshire	DBY	EM	Con	Con	24,908	52.2%	12,774	70.7%	24,908	12,134	6,497	2,292		1,898								47,729
Mid Dorset and North Poole	DOR	SW	LD	Con	23,639	50.8%	10,530	72.3%	23,639	2,767	5,663	13,109		1,321								46,499
Mid Norfolk	NFK	E	Con	Con	27,206	52.1%	17,276	67.7%	27,206	9,585	9,930	3,300		2,191								52,212
Mid Sussex	WSX	SE	Con	Con	32,268	56.1%	24,286	70.9%	32,268	7,982	6,898	6,604		2,453							1,287	57,492
Mid Ulster	NIR	NIR	SF	SF	19,935	48.7%	13,617	60.3%	120		863				5,465		19,935	6,318	5,055	778	2,388	40,922
Mid Worcestershire	HWR	WM	Con	Con	29,763	57.0%	20,532	71.5%	29,763	7,548	9,231	3,750		1,933								52,225
Middlesbrough	CLV	NE	Lab	Lab	18,584	56.8%	12,477	52.9%	5,388	18,584	6,107	1,220		1,407								32,706
Middlesbrough South and East Cleveland	CLV	NE	Lab	Lab	19,193	42.0%	2,268	64.2%	16,925	19,193	6,935	1,564		1,060								45,677
Midlothian	SCT	SCT	Lab	SNP	24,453	50.6%	9,859	71.2%	5,760	14,594	1,173	1,132	24,453	1,219								48,331
Milton Keynes North	BKM	SE	Con	Con	27,244	47.2%	9,753	66.4%	27,244	17,491	6,852	3,575		2,255							275	57,692
Milton Keynes South	BKM	SE	Con	Con	27,601	46.8%	8,672	65.8%	27,601	18,929	7,803	2,309		1,936							371	58,949
Mitcham and Morden	LND	LND	Lab	Lab	27,380	60.7%	16,922	65.9%	10,458	27,380	4,287	1,378		1,422							217	45,142
Mole Valley	SRY	SE	Con	Con	33,434	60.6%	25,453	74.5%	33,434	4,565	6,181	7,981		2,979								55,140
Monmouth	GNT	WLS	Con	Con	23,701	49.9%	10,982	76.2%	23,701	12,719	4,942	2,496		1,629		1,875					100	47,462
Montgomeryshire	POW	WLS	Con	Con	15,204	45.0%	5,325	69.3%	15,204	1,900	3,769	9,879		1,260		1,745						33,757
Moray	SCT	SCT	SNP	SNP	24,384	49.5%	9,065	68.7%	15,319	4,898	1,939	1,395	24,384	1,345								49,280
Morecambe and Lunesdale	LAN	NW	Con	Con	19,691	45.5%	4,590	64.6%	19,691	15,101	5,358	1,612		1,395							85	43,242
Morley and Outwood	WYK	YTH	Lab	Con	18,776	38.9%	422	63.6%	18,776	18,354	7,951	1,426		1,264							479	48,250
Motherwell and Wishaw	SCT	SCT	Lab	SNP	27,275	56.5%	11,898	68.6%	3,695	15,377	1,289	601	27,275									48,237
Na h-Eileanan an Iar	SCT	SCT	SNP	SNP	8,662	54.3%	4,102	73.2%	1,215	4,560		456	8,662								1,045	15,938
Neath	WGM	WLS	Lab	Lab	16,270	43.8%	9,548	66.2%	5,691	16,270	6,094	1,173		1,185		6,722						37,135
New Forest East	HAM	SE	Con	Con	27,819	56.3%	19,162	68.0%	27,819	6,018	8,657	4,626		2,327								49,447
New Forest West	HAM	SE	Con	Con	28,420	59.9%	20,604	69.3%	28,420	5,133	7,816	3,293		2,748								47,410
Newark	NTT	EM	Con	Con	29,834	57.0%	18,474	70.9%	29,834	11,360	6,294	2,385		1,792							637	52,302
Newbury	BRK	SE	Con	Con	34,973	61.0%	26,368	72.1%	34,973	4,837	6,195	8,605		2,324							366	57,300
Newcastle upon Tyne Central	TWR	NE	Lab	Lab	19,301	55.0%	12,673	60.3%	6,628	19,301	5,214	2,218		1,724								35,085
Newcastle upon Tyne East	TWR	NE	Lab	Lab	19,378	49.4%	12,494	61.1%	6,884	19,378	4,910	4,332		3,426							292	39,222
Newcastle upon Tyne North	TWR	NE	Lab	Lab	20,689	46.1%	10,153	66.1%	10,536	20,689	7,447	4,366		1,515							338	44,891
Newcastle-under-Lyme	STS	WM	Lab	Lab	16,520	38.4%	650	63.6%	15,870	16,520	7,252	1,826		1,246							283	42,997
Newport East	GNT	WLS	Lab	Lab	14,290	40.7%	4,705	62.7%	9,585	14,290	6,466	2,251		887		1,231					398	35,108
Newport West	GNT	WLS	Lab	Lab	16,633	41.2%	3,510	64.9%	13,123	16,633	6,134	1,581		1,272		1,604						40,347
Newry and Armagh	NIR	NIR	SF	SF	20,488	41.1%	4,176	64.2%	210								20,488	16,312	12,026	841		49,877
Newton Abbot	DEV	SW	Con	Con	22,794	47.2%	11,234	69.0%	22,794	4,736	6,726	11,560		2,216							221	48,253
Normanton, Pontefract and Castleford	WYK	YTH	Lab	Lab	25,213	54.9%	15,428	55.6%	9,569	25,213	9,785	1,330										45,897
North Antrim	NIR	NIR	DUP	DUP	18,107	43.2%	11,546	55.2%	368		1,341				18,107		5,143	5,054	2,925	2,351	6,618	41,907
North Ayrshire and Arran	SCT	SCT	Lab	SNP	28,641	53.2%	13,573	71.1%	7,968	15,068	1,296	896	28,641									53,869
North Cornwall	CUL	SW	LD	Con	21,689	45.0%	6,621	71.8%	21,689	2,621	6,121	15,068		2,063							683	48,245
North Devon	DEV	SW	LD	Con	22,341	42.7%	6,936	70.0%	22,341	3,699	7,719	15,405		3,018							138	52,320
North Dorset	DOR	SW	Con	Con	30,227	56.6%	21,118	72.4%	30,227	4,785	9,109	6,226		3,038								53,385
North Down	NIR	NIR	Ind	Ind	17,689	49.2%	9,202	56.0%	1,593		1,482			1,958	8,487		273		355	3,086	18,713	35,947
North Durham	DUR	NE	Lab	Lab	22,047	54.9%	13,644	61.4%	8,403	22,047	6,404	2,046		1,246								40,146
North East Bedfordshire	BDF	E	Con	Con	34,891	59.5%	25,644	70.2%	34,891	9,247	8,579	3,418		2,537								58,672
North East Cambridgeshire	CAM	E	Con	Con	28,524	55.1%	16,874	62.4%	28,524	7,476	11,650	2,314		1,816								51,780
North East Derbyshire	DBY	EM	Lab	Lab	19,488	40.6%	1,883	67.1%	17,605	19,488	7,631	2,004		1,059							161	47,948
North East Fife	SCT	SCT	LD	SNP	18,523	40.9%	4,344	73.0%	7,373	3,476		14,179	18,523	1,387							325	45,263
North East Hampshire	HAM	SE	Con	Con	35,573	65.9%	29,916	70.2%	35,573	5,290	4,732	5,657		2,364							384	54,000
North East Hertfordshire	HRT	E	Con	Con	28,949	55.4%	19,080	70.7%	28,949	9,869	6,728	3,952		2,789								52,287
North East Somerset	AVN	SW	Con	Con	25,439	49.8%	12,749	73.7%	25,439	12,690	6,150	4,029		2,802								51,110
North Herefordshire	HWR	WM	Con	Con	26,716	55.6%	19,996	70.7%	26,716	5,478	6,720	5,768		3,341								48,023
North Norfolk	NFK	E	LD	LD	19,299	39.1%	4,043	71.8%	15,256	5,043	8,328	19,299		1,488								49,414
North Shropshire	SAL	WM	Con	Con	27,041	51.4%	16,494	66.7%	27,041	10,547	9,262	3,148		2,575								52,573
North Somerset	AVN	SW	Con	Con	31,540	53.5%	23,099	73.5%	31,540	8,441	7,669	7,486		3,806								58,942
North Swindon	WIL	SW	Con	Con	26,295	50.3%	11,786	64.5%	26,295	14,509	8,011	1,704		1,723								52,242
North Thanet	KEN	SE	Con	Con	23,045	49.0%	10,948	65.8%	23,045	8,411	12,097	1,645		1,719							136	47,053
North Tyneside	TWR	NE	Lab	Lab	26,191	55.9%	17,194	59.0%	8,997	26,191	7,618	2,075		1,442							495	46,818
North Warwickshire	WAR	WM	Con	Con	20,042	42.3%	2,973	67.5%	20,042	17,069	8,256	978		894							138	47,377
North West Cambridgeshire	CAM	E	Con	Con	32,070	52.5%	19,795	67.6%	32,070	10,927	12,275	3,479		2,159							190	61,100
North West Durham	DUR	NE	Lab	Lab	20,074	46.9%	10,056	61.3%	10,018	20,074	7,265	3,894		1,567								42,818
North West Hampshire	HAM	SE	Con	Con	32,052	58.1%	23,943	69.7%	32,052	7,342	8,109	5,151		2,541								55,195
North West Leicestershire	LEI	EM	Con	Con	25,505	49.5%	11,373	71.4%	25,505	14,132	8,704	2,033		1,174								51,548
North West Norfolk	NFK	E	Con	Con	24,727	52.2%	13,948	63.7%	24,727	10,779	8,412	1,673		1,780								47,371
North Wiltshire	WIL	SW	Con	Con	28,938	57.2%	21,046	74.5%	28,938	4,930	5,813	7,892		2,350							633	50,556
Northampton North	NTH	EM	Con	Con	16,699	42.4%	3,245	66.6%	16,699	13,454	6,354	1,401		1,503								39,411
Northampton South	NTH	EM	Con	Con	16,163	41.6%	3,793	63.4%	16,163	12,370	7,114	1,673		1,403							161	38,884
Norwich North	NFK	E	Con	Con	19,052	43.7%	4,463	67.6%	19,052	14,589	5,986	1,894		1,939							132	43,592
Norwich South	NFK	E	LD	Lab	19,033	39.3%	7,654	64.7%	11,379	19,033	4,539	6,607		6,749							156	48,463
Nottingham East	NTT	EM	Lab	Lab	19,208	54.6%	11,894	58.2%	7,314	19,208	3,501	1,475		3,473							238	35,209
Nottingham North	NTT	EM	Lab	Lab	19,283	54.6%	11,860	53.6%	7,423	19,283	6,542	847		1,088							160	35,343
Nottingham South	NTT	EM	Lab	Lab	20,697	47.6%	6,936	63.0%	13,761	20,697	4,900	1,532		2,345							230	43,465
Nuneaton	WAR	WM	Con	Con	20,827	45.5%	4,882	67.2%	20,827	15,945	6,582	816		1,281							298	45,749
Ochil and South Perthshire	SCT	SCT	Lab	SNP	26,620	46.0%	10,168	74.8%	11,987	16,452	1,331	1,481	26,620									57,871
Ogmore	MGM	WLS	Lab	Lab	18,663	52.9%	13,043	63.4%	5,620	18,663	5,420	1,072		754		3,556					165	35,250
Old Bexley and Sidcup	LND	LND	Con	Con	24,682	52.8%	15,803	70.8%	24,682	8,879	8,528	1,644		1,336							1,679	46,748
Oldham East and Saddleworth	GTM	NW	Lab	Lab	17,529	39.4%	6,002	62.2%	11,527	17,529	8,557	5,718		1,152								44,483
Oldham West and Royton	GTM	NW	Lab	Lab	23,630	54.8%	14,738	60.2%	8,187	23,630	8,892	1,589		839								43,137
Orkney and Shetland	SCT	SCT	LD	LD	9,407	41.4%	817	65.8%	2,025	1,624	1,082	9,407	8,590									22,728
Orpington	LND	LND	Con	Con	28,152	57.4%	19,979	72.0%	28,152	7,645	8,173	3,330		1,732								49,032
Oxford East	OXF	SE	Lab	Lab	25,356	50.0%	15,280	64.2%	10,076	25,356	3,451	5,453		5,890							463	50,689
Oxford West and Abingdon	OXF	SE	Con	Con	26,153	45.7%	9,582	75.2%	26,153	7,274	3,963	16,571		2,497							789	57,247
Paisley and Renfrewshire North	SCT	SCT	Lab	SNP	25,601	50.7%	9,076	76.2%	6,183	16,525		1,055	25,601	703							395	50,462
Paisley and Renfrewshire South	SCT	SCT	Lab	SNP	23,548	50.9%	5,684	75.4%	3,526	17,864		1,010	23,548								278	46,226
Pendle	LAN	NW	Con	Con	20,978	47.2%	5,453	68.8%	20,978	15,525	5,415	1,487		1,043								44,448
Penistone and Stocksbridge	SYK	YTH	Lab	Lab	19,691	42.0%	6,723	66.2%	12,968	19,691	10,738	2,957									500	46,854
Penrith and The Border	CMA	NW	Con	Con	26,202	59.7%	19,894	67.4%	26,202	6,308	5,353	3,745		2,313								43,921
Perth and North Perthshire	SCT	SCT	SNP	SNP	27,379	50.5%	9,641	74.8%	17,738	4,413	1,110	2,059	27,379	1,146							355	54,200
Peterborough	CAM	E	Con	Con	18,684	39.7%	1,925	64.9%	18,684	16,759	7,485	1,774		1,218							1,155	47,075
Plymouth Moor View	DEV	SW	Lab	Con	16,020	37.6%	1,026	62.4%	16,020	14,994	9,152	1,265		1,023							152	42,606
Plymouth Sutton and Devonport	DEV	SW	Con	Con	18,120	37.8%	523	65.5%	18,120	17,597	6,731	2,008		3,401							106	47,963
Pontypridd	MGM	WLS	Lab	Lab	15,554	41.1%	8,985	64.3%	6,569	15,554	5,085	4,904		992		4,348					430	37,882
Poole	DOR	SW	Con	Con	23,745	50.1%	15,789	65.3%	23,745	6,102	7,956	5,572		2,198							1,820	47,393
Poplar and Limehouse	LND	LND	Lab	Lab	29,886	58.5%	16,924	62.2%	12,962	29,886	3,128	2,149		2,463							456	51,044
Portsmouth North	HAM	SE	Con	Con	21,343	47.0%	10,537	62.1%	21,343	10,806	8,660	2,828		1,450							303	45,390
Portsmouth South	HAM	SE	LD	Con	14,585	34.8%	5,241	58.5%	14,585	8,184	5,595	9,344		3,145							1,050	41,903
Preseli Pembrokeshire	DFD	WLS	Con	Con	16,383	40.4%	4,969	70.8%	16,383	11,414	4,257	780		1,452		2,518					3,752	40,556
Preston	LAN	NW	Lab	Lab	18,755	56.0%	12,067	55.8%	6,688	18,755	5,139	1,244		1,643								33,469
Pudsey	WYK	YTH	Con	Con	23,637	46.4%	4,501	72.2%	23,637	19,136	4,689	1,926		1,539								50,927
Putney	LND	LND	Con	Con	23,018	53.8%	10,180	67.0%	23,018	12,838	1,989	2,717		2,067							184	42,813
Rayleigh and Wickford	ESS	E	Con	Con	29,088	54.7%	17,230	69.0%	29,088	6,705	11,858	1,622		1,529							2,418	53,220
Reading East	BRK	SE	Con	Con	23,217	46.0%	6,520	69.0%	23,217	16,697	3,647	3,719		3,214								50,494
Reading West	BRK	SE	Con	Con	23,082	47.7%	6,650	66.7%	23,082	16,432	4,826	2,355		1,406							303	48,404
Redcar	CLV	NE	LD	Lab	17,946	43.9%	10,388	63.1%	6,630	17,946	7,516	7,558		880							389	40,919
Redditch	HWR	WM	Con	Con	20,771	47.1%	7,054	67.3%	20,771	13,717	7,133	1,349		960							168	44,098
Reigate	SRY	SE	Con	Con	29,151	56.8%	22,334	69.9%	29,151	6,578	6,817	5,369		3,434								51,349
Rhondda	MGM	WLS	Lab	Lab	15,976	50.7%	7,455	60.9%	2,116	15,976	3,998	474		453		8,521						31,538
Ribble Valley	LAN	NW	Con	Con	25,404	48.6%	13,606	67.5%	25,404	11,798	8,250	2,756		2,193							1,842	52,243
Richmond (Yorks)	NYK	YTH	Con	Con	27,744	51.4%	19,550	68.3%	27,744	7,124	8,194	3,465		2,313							5,159	53,999
Richmond Park	LND	LND	Con	Con	34,404	58.2%	23,015	76.5%	34,404	7,296	2,464	11,389		3,548								59,101
Rochdale	GTM	NW	Lab	Lab	20,961	46.1%	12,442	58.8%	7,742	20,961	8,519	4,667		1,382							2,159	45,430
Rochester and Strood	KEN	SE	Con	Con	23,142	44.1%	7,133	68.1%	23,142	10,396	16,009	1,251		1,516							202	52,516
Rochford and Southend East	ESS	E	Con	Con	20,241	46.4%	9,476	60.6%	20,241	10,765	8,948	1,459		2,195								43,608
Romford	LND	LND	Con	Con	25,067	51.0%	13,859	67.7%	25,067	10,268	11,208	1,413		1,222								49,178
Romsey and Southampton North	HAM	SE	Con	Con	26,285	54.3%	17,712	72.8%	26,285	5,749	5,511	8,573		2,280								48,398
Ross, Skye and Lochaber	SCT	SCT	LD	SNP	20,119	48.1%	5,124	77.2%	2,598	2,043	814	14,995	20,119	1,051							191	41,811
Rossendale and Darwen	LAN	NW	Con	Con	22,847	46.6%	5,654	66.4%	22,847	17,193	6,862	806		1,046							270	49,024
Rother Valley	SYK	YTH	Lab	Lab	20,501	43.6%	7,297	63.3%	10,945	20,501	13,204	1,992									377	47,019
Rotherham	SYK	YTH	Lab	Lab	19,860	52.5%	8,446	59.4%	4,656	19,860	11,414	1,093									800	37,823
Rugby	WAR	WM	Con	Con	24,040	49.1%	10,345	68.4%	24,040	13,695	6,855	2,776		1,415							225	49,006
Ruislip, Northwood and Pinner	LND	LND	Con	Con	30,521	59.6%	20,224	70.0%	30,521	10,297	5,598	2,537		1,801							468	51,222
Runnymede and Weybridge	SRY	SE	Con	Con	29,901	59.7%	22,134	67.8%	29,901	7,767	6,951	3,362		2,071								50,052
Rushcliffe	NTT	EM	Con	Con	28,354	51.4%	13,829	75.3%	28,354	14,525	5,943	2,783		3,559								55,164
Rutherglen and Hamilton West	SCT	SCT	Lab	SNP	30,279	52.6%	9,975	69.6%	4,350	20,304	1,301	1,045	30,279								336	57,615
Rutland and Melton	LEI	EM	Con	Con	30,383	55.6%	21,705	68.5%	30,383	8,383	8,678	4,407		2,325							427	54,603
Saffron Walden	ESS	E	Con	Con	32,926	57.2%	24,991	71.4%	32,926	6,791	7,935	6,079		2,174							1,658	57,563
Salford and Eccles	GTM	NW	Lab	Lab	21,364	49.4%	12,541	58.2%	8,823	21,364	7,806	1,614		2,251							1,403	43,261
Salisbury	WIL	SW	Con	Con	28,192	55.6%	20,421	72.9%	28,192	7,771	6,152	5,099		2,762							729	50,705
Scarborough and Whitby	NYK	YTH	Con	Con	20,613	43.2%	6,200	64.9%	20,613	14,413	8,162	2,159		2,185							207	47,739
Scunthorpe	HUM	YTH	Lab	Lab	15,393	41.7%	3,134	57.7%	12,259	15,393	6,329	770		887							1,303	36,941
Sedgefield	DUR	NE	Lab	Lab	18,275	47.2%	6,843	61.6%	11,432	18,275	6,426	1,370		1,213								38,716
Sefton Central	MSY	NW	Lab	Lab	26,359	53.8%	11,846	72.4%	14,513	26,359	4,879	2,086		1,184								49,021
Selby and Ainsty	NYK	YTH	Con	Con	27,725	52.5%	13,557	69.4%	27,725	14,168	7,389	1,920		1,465							137	52,804
Sevenoaks	KEN	SE	Con	Con	28,531	56.9%	19,561	69.7%	28,531	6,448	8,970	3,937		2,238								50,124
Sheffield Brightside and Hillsborough	SYK	YTH	Lab	Lab	22,663	56.6%	13,807	56.5%	4,407	22,663	8,856	1,802		1,712							613	40,053
Sheffield Central	SYK	YTH	Lab	Lab	24,308	55.0%	17,309	61.1%	4,917	24,308	3,296	4,278		6,999							375	44,173
Sheffield Hallam	SYK	YTH	LD	LD	22,215	40.0%	2,353	76.7%	7,544	19,862	3,575	22,215		1,772							513	55,481
Sheffield Heeley	SYK	YTH	Lab	Lab	20,269	48.2%	12,954	61.9%	6,792	20,269	7,315	4,746		2,566							360	42,048
Sheffield South East	SYK	YTH	Lab	Lab	21,439	51.4%	12,311	59.2%	7,242	21,439	9,128	2,226		1,117							533	41,685
Sherwood	NTT	EM	Con	Con	22,833	45.0%	4,647	69.1%	22,833	18,186	7,399	1,094		1,108							78	50,698
Shipley	WYK	YTH	Con	Con	25,269	50.0%	9,624	71.7%	25,269	15,645	4,479	1,949		2,657							543	50,542
Shrewsbury and Atcham	SAL	WM	Con	Con	24,628	45.5%	9,565	70.8%	24,628	15,063	7,813	4,268		2,247							83	54,102
Sittingbourne and Sheppey	KEN	SE	Con	Con	24,425	49.5%	12,168	65.0%	24,425	9,673	12,257	1,563		1,185							275	49,378
Skipton and Ripon	NYK	YTH	Con	Con	30,248	55.4%	20,761	71.2%	30,248	9,487	7,651	4,057		3,116								54,559
Sleaford and North Hykeham	LIN	EM	Con	Con	34,805	56.2%	24,115	70.4%	34,805	10,690	9,716	3,500									3,233	61,944
Slough	BRK	SE	Lab	Lab	23,421	48.5%	7,336	55.9%	16,085	23,421	6,274	1,275		1,220								48,275
Solihull	WMD	WM	LD	Con	26,956	49.2%	12,902	70.3%	26,956	5,693	6,361	14,054		1,632							83	54,779
Somerton and Frome	SOM	SW	LD	Con	31,960	53.0%	20,268	72.4%	31,960	4,419	6,439	11,692		5,434							365	60,309
South Antrim	NIR	NIR	DUP	UUP	11,942	32.7%	949	54.2%	415						10,993		4,699	11,942	2,990	3,576	1,908	36,523
South Basildon and East Thurrock	ESS	E	Con	Con	19,788	43.4%	7,691	64.1%	19,788	11,493	12,097	1,356									859	45,593
South Cambridgeshire	CAM	E	Con	Con	31,454	51.1%	20,594	73.1%	31,454	10,860	6,010	9,368		3,848								61,540
South Derbyshire	DBY	EM	Con	Con	25,066	49.4%	11,471	68.7%	25,066	13,595	8,998	1,887		1,216								50,762
South Dorset	DOR	SW	Con	Con	23,756	48.9%	11,994	67.9%	23,756	11,762	7,304	2,901		2,275							599	48,597
South Down	NIR	NIR	SDLP	SDLP	18,077	42.3%	5,891	56.8%	318		3,044				3,486		12,186	3,964	18,077	1,622		42,697
South East Cambridgeshire	CAM	E	Con	Con	28,845	48.5%	16,837	70.4%	28,845	9,013	6,593	12,008		3,047								59,506
South East Cornwall	CUL	SW	Con	Con	25,516	50.5%	16,995	71.1%	25,516	4,692	7,698	8,521		2,718							1,353	50,498
South Holland and The Deepings	LIN	EM	Con	Con	29,303	59.6%	18,567	64.4%	29,303	6,122	10,736	1,466		1,580								49,207
South Leicestershire	LEI	EM	Con	Con	28,700	53.2%	16,824	70.2%	28,700	11,876	9,363	3,987										53,926
South Norfolk	NFK	E	Con	Con	30,995	54.3%	20,493	70.8%	30,995	10,502	7,847	4,689		3,090								57,123
South Northamptonshire	NTH	EM	Con	Con	36,607	60.1%	26,416	71.0%	36,607	10,191	8,204	3,613		2,247								60,862
South Ribble	LAN	NW	Con	Con	24,313	46.4%	5,945	68.5%	24,313	18,368	7,377	2,312										52,370
South Shields	TWR	NE	Lab	Lab	18,589	51.3%	10,614	57.8%	6,021	18,589	7,975	639		1,614							1,427	36,265
South Staffordshire	STS	WM	Con	Con	29,478	59.4%	20,371	68.2%	29,478	9,107	8,267	1,448		1,298								49,598
South Suffolk	SFK	E	Con	Con	27,546	53.1%	17,545	70.3%	27,546	10,001	7,897	4,044		2,253							166	51,907
South Swindon	WIL	SW	Con	Con	22,777	46.2%	5,785	66.6%	22,777	16,992	5,920	1,817		1,757								49,263
South Thanet	KEN	SE	Con	Con	18,838	38.1%	2,812	69.6%	18,838	11,740	16,026	932		1,076							789	49,401
South West Bedfordshire	BDF	E	Con	Con	28,212	55.0%	17,813	64.7%	28,212	10,399	7,941	2,646		2,106								51,304
South West Devon	DEV	SW	Con	Con	28,500	56.6%	20,109	70.9%	28,500	8,391	7,306	3,767		2,408								50,372
South West Hertfordshire	HRT	E	Con	Con	32,608	56.9%	23,263	71.9%	32,608	9,345	6,603	5,872		2,583							256	57,267
South West Norfolk	NFK	E	Con	Con	25,515	50.9%	13,861	65.1%	25,515	8,649	11,654	2,217		2,075								50,110
South West Surrey	SRY	SE	Con	Con	34,199	59.9%	28,556	73.7%	34,199	5,415	5,643	3,586		3,105							5,171	57,119
South West Wiltshire	WIL	SW	Con	Con	27,198	52.7%	18,168	70.7%	27,198	6,948	9,030	5,482		2,985								51,643
Southampton Itchen	HAM	SE	Lab	Con	18,656	41.7%	2,316	61.9%	18,656	16,340	6,010	1,595		1,876							233	44,710
Southampton Test	HAM	SE	Lab	Lab	18,017	41.3%	3,810	62.1%	14,207	18,017	5,566	2,121		2,568							1,173	43,652
Southend West	ESS	E	Con	Con	22,175	49.8%	14,021	66.6%	22,175	8,154	7,803	4,129		2,083							165	44,509
Southport	MSY	NW	LD	LD	13,652	31.0%	1,322	65.5%	12,330	8,468	7,429	13,652		1,230							992	44,101
Spelthorne	SRY	SE	Con	Con	24,386	49.7%	14,152	68.6%	24,386	9,114	10,234	3,163		1,724							458	49,079
St Albans	HRT	E	Con	Con	25,392	46.6%	12,732	71.8%	25,392	12,660	4,271	10,076		2,034								54,433
St Austell and Newquay	CUL	SW	LD	Con	20,250	40.2%	8,173	65.7%	20,250	5,150	8,503	12,077		2,318							2,063	50,361
St Helens North	MSY	NW	Lab	Lab	26,378	57.0%	17,291	61.5%	9,087	26,378	6,983	2,046		1,762								46,256
St Helens South and Whiston	MSY	NW	Lab	Lab	28,950	59.8%	21,243	62.3%	7,707	28,950	6,766	2,737		2,237								48,397
St Ives	CUL	SW	LD	Con	18,491	38.3%	2,469	73.7%	18,491	4,510	5,720	16,022		3,051							518	48,312
Stafford	STS	WM	Con	Con	23,606	48.4%	9,177	71.0%	23,606	14,429	6,293	1,348		1,390							1,701	48,767
Staffordshire Moorlands	STS	WM	Con	Con	21,770	51.1%	10,174	67.5%	21,770	11,596	6,236	1,759		1,226								42,587
Stalybridge and Hyde	GTM	NW	Lab	Lab	18,447	45.0%	6,686	57.5%	11,761	18,447	7,720	1,256		1,850								41,034
Stevenage	HRT	E	Con	Con	21,291	44.5%	4,955	67.7%	21,291	16,336	6,864	1,582		1,369							357	47,799
Stirling	SCT	SCT	Lab	SNP	23,783	45.6%	10,480	77.5%	12,051	13,303		1,392	23,783	1,606								52,135
Stockport	GTM	NW	Lab	Lab	19,771	49.9%	10,061	62.0%	9,710	19,771	5,206	3,034		1,753							175	39,649
Stockton North	CLV	NE	Lab	Lab	19,436	49.1%	8,367	59.8%	11,069	19,436	7,581	884									601	39,571
Stockton South	CLV	NE	Con	Con	24,221	46.8%	5,046	69.0%	24,221	19,175	5,480	1,366		952							603	51,797
Stoke-on-Trent Central	STS	WM	Lab	Lab	12,220	39.3%	5,179	51.3%	7,008	12,220	7,041	1,296		1,123							2,396	31,084
Stoke-on-Trent North	STS	WM	Lab	Lab	15,429	39.9%	4,836	54.1%	10,593	15,429	9,542	1,137		1,091							862	38,654
Stoke-on-Trent South	STS	WM	Lab	Lab	15,319	39.2%	2,539	57.4%	12,780	15,319	8,298	1,309		1,029							372	39,107
Stone	STS	WM	Con	Con	25,733	54.7%	16,250	69.8%	25,733	9,483	7,620	2,473		1,191							531	47,031
Stourbridge	WMD	WM	Con	Con	21,195	46.0%	6,694	66.6%	21,195	14,501	7,774	1,538		1,021								46,029
Strangford	NIR	NIR	DUP	DUP	15,053	44.4%	10,185	52.8%	2,167		2,237				15,053		876	4,868	2,335	4,687	1,701	33,924
Stratford-on-Avon	WAR	WM	Con	Con	29,674	57.7%	22,876	72.2%	29,674	6,677	6,798	6,182		2,128								51,459
Streatham	LND	LND	Lab	Lab	26,474	53.0%	13,934	63.1%	12,540	26,474	1,602	4,491		4,421							405	49,933
Stretford and Urmston	GTM	NW	Lab	Lab	24,601	53.0%	11,685	67.2%	12,916	24,601	5,068	1,362		2,187							252	46,386
Stroud	GLS	SW	Con	Con	27,813	45.7%	4,866	75.5%	27,813	22,947	4,848	2,086		2,779							346	60,819
Suffolk Coastal	SFK	E	Con	Con	28,855	51.9%	18,842	71.4%	28,855	10,013	8,655	4,777		3,294								55,594
Sunderland Central	TWR	NE	Lab	Lab	20,959	50.2%	11,179	57.2%	9,780	20,959	7,997	1,105		1,706							215	41,762
Surrey Heath	SRY	SE	Con	Con	32,582	59.9%	24,804	68.5%	32,582	6,100	7,778	4,937		2,400							634	54,431
Sutton and Cheam	LND	LND	LD	Con	20,732	41.5%	3,921	72.1%	20,732	5,546	5,341	16,811		1,051							424	49,905
Sutton Coldfield	WMD	WM	Con	Con	27,782	54.6%	16,417	67.8%	27,782	11,365	7,489	2,627		1,426							165	50,854
Swansea East	WGM	WLS	Lab	Lab	17,807	53.0%	12,028	58.0%	5,142	17,807	5,779	1,392				3,498						33,618
Swansea West	WGM	WLS	Lab	Lab	14,967	42.6%	7,036	59.8%	7,931	14,967	4,744	3,178		1,784		2,266					286	35,156
Tamworth	STS	WM	Con	Con	23,606	50.0%	11,302	65.6%	23,606	12,304	8,727	1,427		1,110								47,174
Tatton	CHS	NW	Con	Con	26,552	58.6%	18,241	69.7%	26,552	8,311	4,871	3,850		1,714								45,298
Taunton Deane	SOM	SW	LD	Con	27,849	48.1%	15,491	69.6%	27,849	5,347	6,921	12,358		2,630							2,782	57,887
Telford	SAL	WM	Lab	Con	16,094	39.6%	730	61.4%	16,094	15,364	7,330	927		930								40,645
Tewkesbury	GLS	SW	Con	Con	30,176	54.5%	21,972	70.1%	30,176	8,204	7,128	7,629		2,207								55,344
The Cotswolds	GLS	SW	Con	Con	32,045	56.5%	21,477	72.4%	32,045	5,240	6,188	10,568		2,626								56,667
The Wrekin	SAL	WM	Con	Con	22,579	49.7%	10,743	68.9%	22,579	11,836	7,620	1,959		1,443								45,437
Thirsk and Malton	NYK	YTH	Con	Con	27,545	52.6%	19,456	67.6%	27,545	8,089	7,805	4,703		2,404							1,819	52,365
Thornbury and Yate	AVN	SW	LD	Con	19,924	41.0%	1,495	73.5%	19,924	3,775	5,126	18,429		1,316								48,570
Thurrock	ESS	E	Con	Con	16,692	33.7%	536	63.9%	16,692	16,156	15,718	644									354	49,564
Tiverton and Honiton	DEV	SW	Con	Con	29,030	54.0%	20,173	70.5%	29,030	6,835	8,857	5,626		3,415								53,763
Tonbridge and Malling	KEN	SE	Con	Con	31,887	59.4%	23,734	71.7%	31,887	7,604	8,153	3,660		2,366								53,670
Tooting	LND	LND	Lab	Lab	25,263	47.2%	2,842	69.7%	22,421	25,263	1,537	2,107		2,201								53,529
Torbay	DEV	SW	LD	Con	19,551	40.7%	3,286	63.0%	19,551	4,166	6,540	16,265		1,557								48,079
Torfaen	GNT	WLS	Lab	Lab	16,938	44.6%	8,169	61.3%	8,769	16,938	7,203	1,271		746		2,169					841	37,937
Torridge and West Devon	DEV	SW	Con	Con	28,774	50.9%	18,403	72.0%	28,774	6,015	10,371	7,483		3,941								56,584
Totnes	DEV	SW	Con	Con	24,941	53.0%	18,285	68.6%	24,941	5,988	6,656	4,667		4,845								47,097
Tottenham	LND	LND	Lab	Lab	28,654	67.3%	23,564	60.1%	5,090	28,654	1,512	1,756		3,931							1,615	42,558
Truro and Falmouth	CUL	SW	Con	Con	22,681	44.0%	14,000	70.0%	22,681	7,814	5,967	8,681		4,483							1,918	51,544
Tunbridge Wells	KEN	SE	Con	Con	30,181	58.7%	22,874	70.0%	30,181	7,307	6,481	4,342		2,659							458	51,428
Twickenham	LND	LND	LD	Con	25,580	41.3%	2,017	77.3%	25,580	7,129	3,069	23,563		2,463							200	62,004
Tynemouth	TWR	NE	Lab	Lab	25,791	48.2%	8,240	69.0%	17,551	25,791	6,541	1,595		2,017								53,495
Upper Bann	NIR	NIR	DUP	DUP	15,430	32.7%	2,264	59.0%	201						15,430		11,593	13,166	4,238	1,780	811	47,219
Uxbridge and South Ruislip	LND	LND	Con	Con	22,511	50.2%	10,695	63.4%	22,511	11,816	6,346	2,215		1,414							509	44,811
Vale of Clwyd	CON	WLS	Lab	Con	13,760	39.0%	237	62.4%	13,760	13,523	4,577	915				2,486						35,261
Vale of Glamorgan	SGM	WLS	Con	Con	23,607	46.0%	6,880	70.5%	23,607	16,727	5,489	1,309		1,054		2,869					238	51,293
Vauxhall	LND	LND	Lab	Lab	25,778	53.8%	12,708	58.3%	13,070	25,778	1,385	3,312		3,658							738	47,941
Wakefield	WYK	YTH	Lab	Lab	17,301	40.3%	2,613	60.9%	14,688	17,301	7,862	1,483		1,069							570	42,973
Wallasey	MSY	NW	Lab	Lab	26,176	60.4%	16,348	66.2%	9,828	26,176	5,063	1,011		1,288								43,366
Walsall North	WMD	WM	Lab	Lab	14,392	39.0%	1,937	55.0%	12,455	14,392	8,122	840		529							545	36,883
Walsall South	WMD	WM	Lab	Lab	19,740	47.2%	6,007	61.8%	13,733	19,740	6,540	676		1,149								41,838
Walthamstow	LND	LND	Lab	Lab	28,779	68.9%	23,195	62.4%	5,584	28,779	2,507	1,661		2,661							604	41,796
Wansbeck	NBL	NE	Lab	Lab	19,267	50.0%	10,881	63.5%	8,386	19,267	7,014	2,407		1,454								38,528
Wantage	OXF	SE	Con	Con	31,092	53.3%	21,749	70.3%	31,092	9,343	7,288	7,611		2,986								58,320
Warley	WMD	WM	Lab	Lab	22,012	58.2%	14,702	59.4%	7,310	22,012	6,237	805		1,465								37,829
Warrington North	CHS	NW	Lab	Lab	21,720	47.8%	8,923	63.0%	12,797	21,720	7,757	1,881		1,264								45,419
Warrington South	CHS	NW	Con	Con	25,928	43.7%	2,750	70.0%	25,928	23,178	4,909	3,335		1,765							238	59,353
Warwick and Leamington	WAR	WM	Con	Con	24,249	47.9%	6,606	70.7%	24,249	17,643	4,183	2,512		1,994								50,581
Washington and Sunderland West	TWR	NE	Lab	Lab	20,478	55.0%	13,157	54.6%	7,033	20,478	7,321	993		1,091							341	37,257
Watford	HRT	E	Con	Con	24,400	43.5%	9,794	67.2%	24,400	14,606	5,481	10,152		1,332							178	56,149
Waveney	SFK	E	Con	Con	22,104	42.3%	2,408	65.1%	22,104	19,696	7,580	1,055		1,761								52,196
Wealden	SXE	SE	Con	Con	32,508	57.0%	22,967	71.1%	32,508	6,165	9,541	5,180		3,623								57,017
Weaver Vale	CHS	NW	Con	Con	20,227	43.2%	806	68.5%	20,227	19,421	4,547	1,395		1,183							94	46,867
Wellingborough	NTH	EM	Con	Con	26,265	52.1%	16,397	67.9%	26,265	9,839	9,868	2,240		2,218								50,430
Wells	SOM	SW	LD	Con	26,247	46.1%	7,585	71.7%	26,247	3,780	5,644	18,662		2,331							240	56,904
Welwyn Hatfield	HRT	E	Con	Con	25,281	50.4%	12,153	68.5%	25,281	13,128	6,556	3,140		1,742							358	50,205
Wentworth and Dearne	SYK	YTH	Lab	Lab	24,571	56.9%	13,838	58.1%	6,441	24,571	10,733	1,135									309	43,189
West Aberdeenshire and Kincardine	SCT	SCT	LD	SNP	22,949	41.6%	7,033	75.2%	15,916	2,487	1,006	11,812	22,949	885							141	55,196
West Bromwich East	WMD	WM	Lab	Lab	18,817	50.2%	9,470	58.9%	9,347	18,817	7,949	751		628								37,492
West Bromwich West	WMD	WM	Lab	Lab	16,578	47.3%	7,742	53.5%	8,365	16,578	8,836	550		697								35,026
West Dorset	DOR	SW	Con	Con	28,329	50.2%	16,130	72.4%	28,329	5,633	7,055	12,199		3,242								56,458
West Dunbartonshire	SCT	SCT	Lab	SNP	30,198	59.0%	14,171	73.9%	3,597	16,027		816	30,198								503	51,141
West Ham	LND	LND	Lab	Lab	36,132	68.4%	27,986	58.2%	8,146	36,132	3,950	1,430		2,651							484	52,793
West Lancashire	LAN	NW	Lab	Lab	24,474	49.3%	8,360	70.1%	16,114	24,474	6,058	1,298		1,582							150	49,676
West Suffolk	SFK	E	Con	Con	25,684	52.2%	14,984	64.6%	25,684	8,604	10,700	2,465		1,779								49,232
West Tyrone	NIR	NIR	SF	SF	16,807	43.5%	10,060	60.5%	169					780	6,747		16,807	6,144	6,444	869	694	38,654
West Worcestershire	HWR	WM	Con	Con	30,342	56.1%	22,578	73.7%	30,342	7,244	7,764	5,245		3,505								54,100
Westminster North	LND	LND	Lab	Lab	18,504	46.8%	1,977	63.4%	16,527	18,504	1,489	1,457		1,322							215	39,514
Westmorland and Lonsdale	CMA	NW	LD	LD	25,194	51.5%	8,949	74.3%	16,245	2,661	3,031	25,194		1,798								48,929
Weston-Super-Mare	AVN	SW	Con	Con	25,203	48.0%	15,609	65.4%	25,203	9,594	9,366	5,486		2,592							311	52,552
Wigan	GTM	NW	Lab	Lab	23,625	52.2%	14,236	59.6%	9,389	23,625	8,818	1,255		1,273							933	45,293
Wimbledon	LND	LND	Con	Con	25,225	52.1%	12,619	73.5%	25,225	12,606	2,476	6,129		1,986								48,422
Winchester	HAM	SE	Con	Con	30,425	55.0%	16,914	74.6%	30,425	4,613	4,122	13,511		2,645								55,316
Windsor	BRK	SE	Con	Con	31,797	63.4%	25,083	70.1%	31,797	6,714	4,992	4,323		1,834							500	50,160
Wirral South	MSY	NW	Lab	Lab	20,165	48.2%	4,599	73.5%	15,566	20,165	3,737	1,474		895								41,837
Wirral West	MSY	NW	Con	Lab	18,898	45.1%	417	75.6%	18,481	18,898	2,772	1,433									274	41,858
Witham	ESS	E	Con	Con	27,123	57.5%	19,554	70.3%	27,123	7,467	7,569	2,891		2,038							80	47,168
Witney	OXF	SE	Con	Con	35,201	60.2%	25,155	73.3%	35,201	10,046	5,352	3,953		2,970							960	58,482
Woking	SRY	SE	Con	Con	29,199	56.2%	20,810	70.0%	29,199	8,389	5,873	6,047		2,109							347	51,964
Wokingham	BRK	SE	Con	Con	32,329	57.7%	24,197	71.9%	32,329	8,132	5,516	7,572		2,092							358	55,999
Wolverhampton North East	WMD	WM	Lab	Lab	15,669	46.1%	5,495	55.7%	10,174	15,669	6,524	935		701								34,003
Wolverhampton South East	WMD	WM	Lab	Lab	18,539	53.3%	10,778	55.6%	7,761	18,539	7,061	798		605								34,764
Wolverhampton South West	WMD	WM	Con	Lab	17,374	43.2%	801	66.6%	16,573	17,374	4,310	845		1,058							49	40,209
Worcester	HWR	WM	Con	Con	22,534	45.3%	5,646	68.6%	22,534	16,888	6,378	1,677		2,024							222	49,723
Workington	CMA	NW	Lab	Lab	16,282	42.3%	4,686	65.6%	11,596	16,282	7,538	1,708		1,149							190	38,463
Worsley and Eccles South	GTM	NW	Lab	Lab	18,600	44.2%	5,946	58.3%	12,654	18,600	7,688	1,100		1,242							764	42,048
Worthing West	WSX	SE	Con	Con	26,124	51.5%	16,855	67.1%	26,124	7,955	9,269	4,477		2,938								50,763
Wrexham	CON	WLS	Lab	Lab	12,181	37.2%	1,831	64.2%	10,350	12,181	5,072	1,735		669		2,501					211	32,719
Wycombe	BKM	SE	Con	Con	26,444	51.4%	14,856	67.4%	26,444	11,588	5,198	4,546		3,086							577	51,439
Wyre and Preston North	LAN	NW	Con	Con	26,528	53.2%	14,151	70.6%	26,528	12,377	6,577	2,712		1,699								49,893
Wyre Forest	HWR	WM	Con	Con	22,394	45.3%	12,871	63.9%	22,394	9,523	7,967	1,228		1,117							7,211	49,440
Wythenshawe and Sale East	GTM	NW	Lab	Lab	21,693	50.1%	10,569	56.9%	11,124	21,693	6,354	1,927		1,658							507	43,263
Yeovil	SOM	SW	LD	Con	24,178	42.5%	5,313	69.1%	24,178	4,053	7,646	18,865		2,191								56,933
Ynys Mon	GWN	WLS	Lab	Lab	10,871	31.1%	229	69.9%	7,393	10,871	5,121	751				10,642					148	34,926
York Central	NYK	YTH	Lab	Lab	20,212	42.4%	6,716	63.3%	13,496	20,212	4,795	3,804		4,791							579	47,677
York Outer	NYK	YTH	Con	Con	26,477	49.1%	13,129	68.6%	26,477	13,348	5,251	6,269		2,558								53,903
Total for all constituencies								66.2%	11,299,609	9,347,273	3,881,099	2,415,916	1,454,436	1,157,630	184,260	181,704	176,232	114,935	99,809	61,556	323,066	30,697,525
Total for all constituencies								66.2%	36.8%	30.4%	12.6%	7.9%	4.7%	3.8%	0.6%	0.6%	0.6%	0.4%	0.3%	0.2%	1.1%	100.0%
Total for all constituencies								66.2%	Seats													
Total for all constituencies								66.2%	330	232	1	8	56	1	8	3	4	2	3	0	2	650
Total for all constituencies								66.2%	50.8%	35.7%	0.2%	1.2%	8.6%	0.2%	1.2%	0.5%	0.6%	0.3%	0.5%	0.0%	0.3%	100.0%

== See also ==
- 2015 United Kingdom general election in England
- 2015 United Kingdom general election in Northern Ireland
- 2015 United Kingdom general election in Scotland
- 2015 United Kingdom general election in Wales
- Results of the 2010 United Kingdom general election
- Results of the 2017 United Kingdom general election
- List of political parties in the United Kingdom
- List of United Kingdom by-elections (2010–present)
- Opinion polling in United Kingdom constituencies (2010–15)
