= Jeff Maurer =

- Born: July 9, 1947 (age 79)
- Education: Alfred University (1965-1969); NYU Stern School of Business (1969-1975); St. John's University School of Law (1973-1976)
- Occupations: Chairman, Evercore Wealth Management and Evercore Trust Company, N.A.
- Spouse: Wendy S. Maurer

Jeff Maurer (born July 9, 1947) is an American fund manager and author who was the founder and chairman of Evercore Wealth Management and Evercore Trust Company. He was also the former CEO of U.S. Trust Corporation and the author of the book Rich in America: Secrets to Creating and Preserving Wealth.

== Early life and career ==
Maurer holds a BA from Alfred University, an MBA from New York University and a JD from St. John's University School of Law.

He joined U.S. Trust in 1970 and held a variety of roles over his 23-year career at the firm, culminating in the positions of Chief Executive Officer and Chairman of the Board. In 2003, he joined Neuberger Berman as Chairman and Chief Executive Officer of Neuberger Berman Trust Company and remained there until 2007. The company was rebranded as "Lehman Brothers Trust Company" until the Lehman Brothers bankruptcy, following which they assumed the Neuberger Berman name again.

Maurer established Evercore Wealth Management in 2008 and Evercore Trust Company, N.A. in 2009; the firms are in the wealth management division of Evercore Partners.

He is a former Chairman of the American Bankers Association's Trust and Investment Management Division and the Trust Management Association.

== Publications ==
Maurer authored the book Rich in America: Secrets to Creating and Preserving Wealth.

== Philanthropy and board positions ==
- Chairman of the Board, Riverspring Health (formerly Hebrew Home of Riverdale) in New York City.
- Member of the board, Weinberg Center for Elder Abuse Prevention.
- Member of the Board of Overseers and vice chairman investment committee, Northwell Health.
- Board member, Alfred University.

== Notes ==
- An Investment Firm, Evercore, Offers Clients Honest Returns
- Roger Altman tells Tampa clients there's little to fear on the economic horizon
- How Jeff Maurer is now ploughing into Florida, using his old Evercore tricks but with new GenSpring wrinkles
