= The Apprentice (American TV series) season 13 =

The Apprentice
- Season 13
- No. of contestants: 14
- Winner: Trace Adkins
- Runner-up: Penn Jillette
- No. of episodes: 12

Release
- Original network: NBC
- Original release: March 3 – May 19, 2013

Season chronology
- ← Previous; Season 12 Next → Season 14

The Celebrity Apprentice 6 (also known as All-Star Celebrity Apprentice or The Apprentice 13) is the sixth installment of the reality game show, The Celebrity Apprentice, which premiered on Sunday, March 3, 2013. This season's cast is an "All-Star" celebrity cast, bringing back many fan favorites to compete head-to-head. There are eight men and six women in the cast. Brande Roderick, Claudia Jordan, Dennis Rodman, La Toya Jackson, Lil Jon, Omarosa Manigault and the only previous winner, Bret Michaels formed team Power and team Plan B was formed by Dee Snider, Gary Busey, Lisa Rinna, Marilu Henner, Penn Jillette, Stephen Baldwin and Trace Adkins. This marked Omarosa's third appearance on The Apprentice, more than any other contestant. Also appearing as guest judges are past winners Joan Rivers, Piers Morgan, Arsenio Hall and John Rich, along with past judge George Ross, as well as Ivanka Trump, Eric Trump, and Donald Trump Jr. This season also introduced the Social Boardroom MVP reward. Viewers went on Twitter to select the celebrity they think did best in the task. The celebrity who received the most votes won additional money for their charity. This season premiered on March 3, 2013.

== Candidates ==
Celebrity	Background	Original team	Age	Hometown	Charity	Result	Raised
Trace Adkins; The Celebrity Apprentice	Country singer	Plan B	51	Sarepta, Louisiana	American Red Cross	The Celebrity Apprentice (5–19–2013)	$1,524,072
Penn Jillette; The Celebrity Apprentice 5	Magician	Plan B	58	Greenfield, Massachusetts	Opportunity Village	Fired in the Season Finale (5–19–2013)	$663,655
Lil Jon; The Celebrity Apprentice 4	DJ, rapper & entrepreneur	Power	42	Atlanta, Georgia	American Diabetes Association	Fired in week 11 (5–12–2013)	$160,000
Lisa Rinna; The Celebrity Apprentice 4	Actress & television host	Plan B	49	Medford, Oregon	St. Jude Children's Research Hospital	Fired in week 11 (5–12–2013)	$504,500
Marilu Henner; The Celebrity Apprentice	Actress & author	Plan B	60	Chicago, Illinois	Alzheimer's Association	Fired in week 10 (5–05–2013)	$50,000
Gary Busey; The Celebrity Apprentice 4	Actor	Plan B	68	Goose Creek, Texas	Busey Foundation for Kids Kawasaki Disease	Fired in week 9 (4–28–2013)	$20,000
Brande Roderick; The Celebrity Apprentice 2	Model & actress	Power	38	Novato, California	Promises 2 Kids	Fired in week 8 (4–21–2013)	$20,000
Stephen Baldwin; The Celebrity Apprentice	Actor & author	Plan B	46	Massapequa, New York	The Carol M. Baldwin Breast Cancer Association	Fired in week 7 (4–14–2013)	$50,000
Dennis Rodman; The Celebrity Apprentice 2	Former NBA power forward	Power	51	Trenton, New Jersey	Make-A-Wish Foundation	Fired in week 6 (4–7–2013)	$20,000
Omarosa; The Celebrity Apprentice (Note: Omarosa was also a contestant on the first season of the original civilian version of the show.)	The Apprentice contestant	Power	38	Youngstown, Ohio	Sue Duncan Children's Center	Fired in week 5 (3–31–2013)	$40,000
Claudia Jordan; The Celebrity Apprentice 2	Model & television host	Power	39	Providence, Rhode Island	The Tom Joyner Foundation	Fired in week 4 (3–24–2013)	
La Toya Jackson; The Celebrity Apprentice 4	Singer, author & businesswoman	Power	56	Gary, Indiana	National Network to End Domestic Violence	Fired in week 3 (3–17–2013)	$20,000
Dee Snider; The Celebrity Apprentice 5	Twisted Sister singer	Plan B	58	Astoria, New York	Broadway Cares/Equity Fights AIDS	Fired in week 2 (3–10–2013)	
Bret Michaels; The Celebrity Apprentice 3	Poison singer	Power	50	Butler, Pennsylvania	Life Rocks Foundation	Fired in week 1 (3–3–2013)	

=== Draft ===
Unlike prior seasons of Celebrity Apprentice which were laid out as men vs. women, Mr. Trump made Trace Adkins and Bret Michaels team captains due to their previous success on the show and allowed them to pick their teams.

Pick	Plan B	Power
Cpt.	Trace Adkins	Bret Michaels
1	Penn Jillete	Omarosa
2	Dee Snider	Lil Jon
3	Marilu Henner	Brande Roderick
4	Stephen Baldwin	La Toya Jackson
5	Lisa Rinna	Claudia Jordan
6	Gary Busey	Dennis Rodman

== Weekly results ==
Candidate	Original team	Week 5 team	Week 7 team	Final Task team	Application result	Record as project manager
Trace Adkins	Plan B	Power	Power	Power	The Celebrity Apprentice	2–0 (win in weeks 1 & 7)
Penn Jillette	Plan B	Plan B	Plan B	Plan B	Fired in the season finale	2–0 (win in weeks 6 & 8)
Lil Jon	Power	Power	Power	Power	Fired in week 11	1–1 (win in week 9, loss in week 5)
Lisa Rinna	Plan B	Plan B	Plan B	Plan B	Fired in week 11	2–0 (win in weeks 5 & 10)
Marilu Henner	Plan B	Plan B	Power	Power	Fired in week 10	1–1 (win in week 4, loss in week 10)
Gary Busey	Plan B	Plan B	Plan B	Power	Fired in week 9	0–2 (loss in weeks 7 & 9)
Brande Roderick	Power	Power	Power		Fired in week 8	0–2 (loss in weeks 1 & 8)
Stephen Baldwin	Plan B	Plan B	Plan B		Fired in week 7	1–0 (win in week 3)
Dennis Rodman	Power	Power		Plan B	Fired in week 6	0–1 (loss in week 6)
Omarosa	Power	Power			Fired in week 5	1–0 (win in week 2)
Claudia Jordan	Power				Fired in week 4	0–1 (loss in week 4)
La Toya Jackson	Power			Plan B	Fired in week 3	0–1 (loss in week 3)
Dee Snider	Plan B				Fired in week 2	0–1 (loss in week 2)
Bret Michaels	Power				Fired in week 1	

== Elimination Table ==
No.	Elimination chart												
No.	Candidate	1	2	3	4	5	6	7	8	9	10	11	12
1	Trace	WIN	IN	IN	IN	IN	BR	WIN	BR	IN	IN	IN	CA
2	Penn	IN	IN	IN	IN	IN	WIN	BR	WIN	IN	IN	IN	FIRED
3	Lil Jon	IN	IN	IN	BR	LOSE	IN	IN	IN	WIN	IN	FIRED	
4	Lisa	IN	IN	IN	IN	WIN	IN	IN	IN	IN	WIN	FIRED	
5	Marilu	IN	IN	IN	WIN	IN	IN	IN	BR	IN	FIRED		
6	Gary	IN	BR	IN	IN	IN	IN	LOSE	IN	FIRED			
7	Brande	LOSE	IN	BR	IN	IN	IN	IN	FIRED				
8	Stephen	IN	BR	WIN	IN	IN	IN	FIRED					
9	Dennis	IN	IN	BR	BR	BR	FIRED						
10	Omarosa	IN	WIN	IN	IN	FIRED							
11	Claudia	IN	IN	IN	FIRED								
12	La Toya	BR	IN	FIRED									
13	Dee	IN	FIRED										
14	Bret	FIRED											

The contestant on the losing team.
The contestant won as project manager on his/her team.
The contestant lost as project manager on his/her team.
The contestant was on the losing team and brought to the final boardroom.
The contestant was fired.
The contestant lost as project manager and was fired.
The contestant did not participate in the task.
The contestant won the competition and was named the Celebrity Apprentice.

== Episodes ==
=== Episode 1: The Wolf in Charge of the Hen House ===
Task 1

- Air Date: March 3, 2013
- Prologue: Trace Adkins and Bret Michaels are called out to pick their teams because they were the most successful on their previous appearance of the show. Trace Adkins forms what will become Plan B, and Bret Michaels forms what will become Power.
- Task Scope: Teams must run their own meatball shop and sell them.
- Power project manager: Brande Roderick
- Plan B project manager: Trace Adkins
- Judges: Donald Trump, Piers Morgan, Ivanka Trump
- Winning team: Plan B
- Reasons for win: Despite a slow start by having the shop closed to the public, the big-check donors donated tremendous amounts of money, with the team earning a grand total of $419,539.
- Losing team: Power
- Reasons for loss: Even though they earned the $20,000 bonus (from sponsor VeriFone) from their appearance on Live! with Kelly and Michael, their donations came up well short. Despite Brande Roderick believing that the team had raised around $350,000, when the actual totals were verified by the Trumps they added up to just $250,533.
- Sent to boardroom: Brande Roderick, Bret Michaels, La Toya Jackson
- Fired: Bret Michaels – for competing on the show instead of advising Donald Trump in the boardroom like the rest of the past winners. Trump also disliked the fact that he allowed Brande Roderick to be the project manager and fell way short of the amount he claimed he could bring in, although Brande could not clarify exactly how much money each teammate raised, due to Omarosa's poor book-keeping.
- Notes:
  - At the beginning of the show, Trump called out Bret Michaels and Trace Adkins, as the two most previously successful candidates from the line-up, and had them choose the teams, with Bret forming what would eventually become Power, and Trace picking the candidates who would form Plan B. On Plan B, Stephen Baldwin initially volunteered to be project manager, but quickly ceded the position to Trace after he revealed some of his particularly rich contacts, while on Power, Bret and Brande Roderick both argued for some time over which of the two should be project manager, eventually leading to Brande literally getting down on her knees and begging to be the project manager, which led to her officially being the project manager.
  - This was the first project manager victory for Trace Adkins in his two Celebrity Apprentice appearances.
  - Other past Celebrity Apprentice candidates such as Niki Taylor and Paul Teutul, Sr. showed up to give donations to the two teams. John Rich, while not appearing himself, also gave a substantial donation to Power by way of La Toya Jackson. Future Celebrity Apprentice candidate Gilbert Gottfried donated to Plan B's store.
  - There was a strong argument between Piers Morgan and Omarosa in the initial boardroom, continuing the feud that had started in the first Celebrity Apprentice season. Virtually every member of Power stepped up to defend Omarosa however, with Dennis Rodman and Claudia Jordan in particular speaking strongly in her favor.
  - Prior to the task result being announced, Stephen Baldwin openly admitted that he had held out on his contacts and brought in no money whatsoever. Trump, Ivanka and Piers were stunned by this admission, and Trump indicated that if Plan B had lost, Stephen would have been fired.
  - Despite being an all-stars edition Bret Michaels was the only previous winner on the show. Trump pointed out several times during the episode, including at the final boardroom verdict, that he actually wanted Bret to be a judge on the series along with the other past winners instead of competing again. Bret Michaels responded by saying that he couldn't raise money for charity if he was a judge.
  - After Bret Michaels was fired, Trump strongly criticized Brande Roderick's lack of control over the team, lack of knowledge of what was brought in (which she delegated to Omarosa), and the fact that she brought back La Toya Jackson instead of Omarosa, adding that the only reason she avoided dismissal was his policy of never firing whoever makes the most money in a given task.
  - Trump called out the Power members over their false claims over how much money each member was responsible for bringing in, after they gave him numbers that were so wildly over-inflated that Power's total would have been almost $310,000, were they telling the truth. Omarosa alone was then asked for who brought in what, but while closer to the actual total her estimate was also off, as her total added up to around $265,000.
  - Since Bret Michaels was fired, there are no more Celebrity Apprentice 3 contestants (Bret was the only competitor from Celebrity Apprentice 3).
  - Mr. Trump repeatedly throughout the episode stated that Bret Michaels should not be a contestant on this season, leading to Bret being fired after the first task, causing everyone to think that Mr. Trump planned this firing throughout the episode.
  - Bret Michaels would be the only candidate to not serve as Project Manager this season.

=== Episode 2: Just as Simple as Making Soup ===
Task 2

- Air Date: March 10, 2013
- Task Scope: Team members must create a 3D interactive photo experience for Universal's marketing campaign.
- Power project manager: Omarosa
- Plan B project manager: Dee Snider
- Judges: Donald Trump, Donald Trump Jr, Eric Trump
- Winning team: Power
- Reasons for win: Even though the brand messaging was poorly given by having the "Orlando" part of "Universal Studios Orlando" put in a position where it was illegible, their creativity of making it all about the films and characters made it very precise and not about the celebrities. The overall construction quality of their experience was also judged to be far better than Plan B's effort.
- Losing team: Plan B
- Reasons for loss: Even though they loved the slogan, they didn't like the simplicity of the project and that they disliked that they had cardboard cutouts of the celebrities, who were stood nearby in exactly the same clothing they had on the cutouts, meaning that passers-by were more interested in the actual celebrities. On top of that, the Universal executives felt that the display was generally poorly executed and cheap-looking, and that the specific celebrities would have very little appeal to the theme park's main target audience of children.
- Sent to boardroom: Dee Snider, Gary Busey, Stephen Baldwin
- Fired: Dee Snider – for admitting he was wholly at fault for the failure of the task, and for passing over a better idea that Penn Jillette suggested. While he criticised Stephen Baldwin's questionable behavior in the task and accused Gary Busey of having a limited skillset, Dee said that neither of them really deserved to be fired.
- Notes:
  - Trace Adkins did not participate in this task due to a previous engagement.
  - Dennis Rodman was singled out for praise by Trump, for asking several pertinent questions to the Universal executives during the task, which helped the team secure their victory. Despite this, Omarosa actually accused Dennis of being her weakest player, and praised Lil Jon for his creativity and work ethic.
  - Omarosa won $40,000 for her charity. This was also the first time Omarosa has ever been the winning project manager in all three stints on the show, when in The Apprentice she went 0–1, and in The Celebrity Apprentice when she went 0–3.
  - Omarosa became very emotional about her win as project manager. She was playing for Sue Duncan's Charity for her late fiancé, Michael Clarke Duncan, who died not long before shooting of this season began.
  - Donald Trump "fired" Penn Jillette for not pushing harder for his idea to be used. Trump followed up by stating that he was just kidding.
  - In the final boardroom, Dee said that he didn't actually want to bring anyone back, and that the only reason he did so was the incident the previous season where Adam Carolla refused to bring anyone back after losing a task as project manager, only for Trump to fire him anyway and then fire Michael Andretti as punishment for Carolla's failure to bring two people back.

=== Episode 3: I'm Being Punked by a Jackson ===
Task 3

- Air Date: March 17, 2013
- Task Scope: To make a Soap Opera themed stage play for Crystal Light Liquid. Teams will be judged on the following criteria of creativity, audience reaction, brand messaging, product integration, and overall presentation.
- Power project manager: La Toya Jackson
- Plan B project manager: Stephen Baldwin
- Judges: Donald Trump, Arsenio Hall, Ivanka Trump
- Task Tension: On Power, there was a major blow-up between Omarosa and La Toya Jackson early in the task, as Omarosa openly questioned La Toya's leadership and refused to take direction from her. Just before the halfway point of the task, Omarosa learned that one of the tabloid news networks was going to release the 911 tape of Michael Clarke Duncan's heart attack, and left the team to deal with the issue. She returned just before the play started, but this was much too late for her to take any real part.
- Winning team: Plan B
- Reasons for win: While the executives didn't like the fact that they only used one flavor of Crystal Light, their play was well received by the audience, and the product was central to the storyline. Trace Adkins also received particular praise for his various roles in the play. Plan B won two-thirds of the audience vote.
- Losing team: Power
- Reasons for loss: Their play had rushed, inconsistent pacing due to the audience interaction segments, and the product integration wasn't highlighted consistently. The executives also felt that while Claudia Jordan was okay as the villainess of their play, the role would have worked much better with Omarosa, who was originally in the role but had to drop out of much of the task due to a personal problem. Power got just a third of the audience vote.
- Trump's thoughts: Trump called La Toya Jackson's decision not to bring back Omarosa the most shocking boardroom mistake he had ever seen in all thirteen seasons of doing the show, and surmised that La Toya was simply too afraid of Omarosa to want to confront her in the boardroom, though La Toya herself stated her belief that Trump had "bought into" Omarosa's pleas for sympathy and that there was no way he would have fired her.
- Sent to boardroom: La Toya Jackson, Brande Roderick, Dennis Rodman
- Fired: La Toya Jackson – for having inconsistencies of the brand messaging during the play and not bringing Omarosa back into the boardroom. Trump felt that Omarosa should have been fired due to her disrespectful behavior to La Toya and the fact that she missed over half of the task, but due to La Toya's decision to bring back Brande Roderick and Dennis Rodman (who were both agreed to not be at all to blame for the loss) instead, she was fired by default as the losing project manager.
- Notes:
  - Stephen Baldwin won $50,000 for his charity.
  - Gary Busey was unanimously deemed the weakest link of Plan B by his teammates during the initial boardroom, leading to him becoming visibly upset.
  - La Toya was strongly criticized for not bringing back Omarosa. Additionally, she was again criticized for earlier stating that Brande was the strongest player in the task, but selected her to come back to the final boardroom over Omarosa.
  - In the boardroom, Arsenio Hall openly questioned whether Omarosa was fit to continue in the process, considering she was still visibly affected by Michael Clarke Duncan's death (which Claudia Jordan and Brande Roderick privately indicated they agreed with, though they did not speak up). Despite becoming tearful, Omarosa made clear her determination to continue in the contest.
  - Trump strongly hinted that Omarosa would have been fired had she been brought back to the boardroom.
  - La Toya Jackson requested Trump to have the liberty & opportunity to fire Omarosa, but Trump refused it because of La Toya's record of getting fired twice.
  - La Toya Jackson became the first ever Apprentice candidate to be fired on three separate occasions (a title which Trump noted would likely have gone to Omarosa had she been brought back).
  - In her exit interview, La Toya Jackson accused Omarosa of "pulling the plug on Michael Clarke Duncan". Omarosa later announced (not on the show) that she would be filing a lawsuit against La Toya.

=== Episode 4: Men in Black Are Gonna Come Get Him ===
Task 4

- Air Date: March 24, 2013
- Task Scope: The players are tasked to use a glass truck in order to promote a marketing campaign for Farouk Systems Products.
- Power project manager: Claudia Jordan
- Plan B project manager: Marilu Henner
- Judges: Donald Trump, Arsenio Hall, Donald Trump Jr.
- Winning team: Plan B
- Reasons for win: Plan B secured appearances by Miss Universe and other beauty queens (snatching them out from under the nose of Power), and made strong use of all their team members. While Stephen hated the slogan ("Experience Silk") that Trace Adkins came up with, the team ultimately had much more of a buzz around their event, and more people lining up to have their hair styled.
- Losing team: Power
- Reasons for loss: Although Farouk liked team Power's Patriotic theme and having all Power members dress as Uncle Sam, Lil Jon felt Plan B used the product and the glass truck better, and didn't understand why Power had set up their salon outside of the truck.
- Sent to boardroom: Claudia Jordan, Dennis Rodman, Lil Jon
- Fired: Claudia Jordan – largely by default as the losing project manager, and also for not defending herself as well as Dennis Rodman. In addition, Trump didn't like that she brought back Lil Jon (who Farouk and even Claudia herself named as the strongest member of the team) instead of Omarosa (who Claudia named the joint-weakest on the task along with Dennis), though this time Trump specified that he did not consider Omarosa at all responsible for the loss, and would not have fired her.
- Notes:
  - Marilu Henner won $50,000 for her charity, with Farouk also announcing that he would donate an extra $1 (up to an additional $50,000) for every Facebook like that her team received.
  - This was the second time where Omarosa did not get brought back in the final boardroom, a comparison to when La Toya failed to do so in Task 3 and ended up getting fired.
  - This was the second task in a row in which Brande was labelled the strongest player.
  - After failing to secure their hoped-for beauty queens from Plan B, Team Power tried to hire a Donald Trump impersonator, only to discover that he had died the day before the task. They ultimately settled for a Joan Rivers impersonator.
  - Prior to the final boardroom, Claudia Jordan got Lil Jon to agree to gang up on Dennis Rodman and get him fired. When they returned to the boardroom however, Lil Jon only made relatively light criticisms of Dennis, and said that he thought Claudia was too afraid of Omarosa to have brought her back in.
  - As with her previous appearance on the show, Claudia Jordan was fired after losing as project manager in the fourth week.
  - This was the first victory as project manager that Marilu Henner had in her two stints on Celebrity Apprentice.
  - Up to this point, all of the winning project managers have been from the first season of the Celebrity Apprentice.

=== Episode 5: Lightning Strikes Mr. Hang Brain ===
Task 5

- Air Date: March 31, 2013
- Task Scope: The celebrities are tasked with creating original, three-dimensional artwork and sell them to raise money for charity.
- Corporate Reshuffle: Because Team Power is four members against six on Plan B, Mr. Trump puts Trace Adkins on Power to even out the teams.
- Power project manager: Lil Jon
- Plan B project manager: Lisa Rinna
- Judges: Donald Trump, Piers Morgan, Eric Trump
- Winning team: Plan B
- Reasons for win: Lisa Rinna, Penn Jillette and Marilu Henner were able to pull in big donations, despite Stephen Baldwin bringing in just $5,000 and Gary Busey bringing in nothing whatsoever. They raised $225,000.
- Losing team: Power
- Reasons for loss: Despite the team generally getting decent-sized donations (even their lowest contributor, Dennis Rodman brought in $10,000), they lacked the big donors that Plan B had access to. As a result, they only raised $179,500.
- Initial tension: Omarosa targeted Lil Jon, accusing him of being dishonest for waiting for a fundraising task to be project manager, which then caused Lil Jon to claim that Omarosa would never have won as project manager on the second task without his help. Dennis Rodman in turn aggressively bombarded Omarosa when he agreed with Morgan's comments about getting rid of Omarosa and saw fake tears in the previous boardroom appearances. Trump was also strongly encouraged by Rodman's perseverance and determination to succeed, which Trump described as his story of redemption.
- Sent to boardroom: Lil Jon, Omarosa, Dennis Rodman
- Fired: Omarosa – for not raising a lot of money, the fact that no one liked her as a team member, targeting Lil Jon (who brought in the most money) rather than Dennis Rodman (who had raised the least amount of money in this task) in the final boardroom, and for not offering a convincing rebuttal to the many criticisms of her made by Dennis and Piers.
- Notes:
  - Special guests included Chaz Dean and the Blue Man Group.
  - Stephen Baldwin was once again accused of holding out on his contacts in the boardroom, though this time he tried to blame Lisa Rinna for selling one of his art pieces without his permission.
  - This was the first project manager victory for Lisa Rinna in her two Celebrity Apprentice appearances.
  - Total donations and raised money was $404,500 for Lisa Rinna's charity.
  - This is the third time Omarosa was fired in an art-selling task.
  - By this point in the season, one person from each previous season has been fired.
  - Plan B hands Power their third loss in a row, and their fourth loss overall. So far, Omarosa is the only successful project manager on the original team Power.
  - Omarosa is the first celebrity fired this season who received money for her charity.
  - This is the first episode of the season with only a one-hour time slot. There was much confusion when the show started at 10:00 Eastern and 9:00 Central as usual, but it was delayed one hour past its normal 8:00 start in Mountain time.
  - In the boardroom, Gary Busey told Mr. Trump that he raised $25,000. Marilu Henner told Mr. Trump that the money was hers, but Gary made the art that was sold. Gary said that it was still his, only for the team to back Marilu up. Mr. Trump then realized Gary brought in $0 and said that could be grounds for firing.
  - As of this point, Omarosa and La Toya are tied for the most times for one contestant to ever be fired.
  - This is Lil Jon's first loss as project manager in his two stints on the show.
  - Omarosa gave $2,000 of her own money to one of her contacts late in the task, to ensure that she would not end up being the person who raised the least amount of money for the team. While Trump and his advisers seemed unaware of this fact, ultimately it did not matter, as Trump did not feel that a difference of $2,000 was enough to justify keeping Omarosa over Dennis Rodman.

=== Episode 6: How Do You Spell Melania ===
Task 6

- Air Date: April 7, 2013
- Task Scope: The celebrities must design and create an advertorial to highlight the new "Melania" skin care line created by Donald's wife, Melania Trump.
- Power project manager: Dennis Rodman
- Plan B project manager: Penn Jillette
- Judges: Donald Trump, Eric Trump, Ivanka Trump
- Winning team: Plan B
- Reasons for win: Despite having a somewhat unprofessional presentation, in which Penn Jillette mistakenly referred to Melania as a spokesperson rather than the brand's creator, and Gary Busey also made inappropriate remarks, Melania loved the slogan and the advert that showcased the elegance and beauty the brand aimed to convey.
- Losing team: Power
- Reasons for loss: Melania loved the display and credited Brande Roderick for her presentation skills, but Team Power was criticized for the color and format choices. However, the team also made a fatal mistake by misspelling Melania's name as "Milania" on one of the adverts. This was cited by Donald Trump as the main reason for their loss.
- Trump's thoughts: Donald and Melania were embarrassed that nobody on Team Power noticed the spelling slip-up that was on the advert. Trump asked Trace how he would react if he hired a company to produce promotional material for a concert and they misspelled his name as "Trace Atkins," to which Trace admitted that this actually had happened to him on more than one occasion, and that he never hired the companies responsible again.
- Sent to boardroom: Dennis Rodman & Trace Adkins
- Fired: Dennis Rodman – for being in the final boardroom four times in a row, being a weak leader and making very few of the creative decisions, and for signing off on the adverts which included the misspelling. Donald was a bit disappointed in Trace's performance as he was in charge of the advertorial, but Dennis was fired instead for his lack of work ethic, as Trace was the harder worker of the two.
- Notes:
  - Penn Jillette won $40,000 for his charity.
  - Eric Trump was somewhat brusquely dismissed by Penn Jillette when he showed up at Plan B's photoshoot. Penn told Eric "You are such a disruptive force just split nice chatting." This was the first time an advisor was told something like this. Penn later referred to Eric as "the guy who brings in 10 pounds of hamburger when you've got a bunch of sled dogs working really hard."
  - Trump allowed Dennis Rodman to bring Trace Adkins alone back to the final boardroom, after Dennis said that he couldn't hold Lil Jon or Brande Roderick accountable for the loss.
  - This is Power's fourth loss in a row.

=== Episode 7: The First Leaf That Hits The Ground ===
Task 7

- Air Date: April 14, 2013
- Task Scope: The All-Stars must work to promote a popular Australian Gold products by writing, producing, and directing a silent Western video.
- Corporate Reshuffle: Marilu Henner is put on Team Power to even out the teams. Trump refused to move Penn over to Team Power when Trace requested him, causing Trace to suspect that he and Penn were the frontrunners.
- Power project manager: Trace Adkins
- Plan B project manager: Gary Busey
- Judges: Donald Trump, Donald Trump Jr., Ivanka Trump
- Winning team: Power
- Reasons for win: The executives thought that Trace's performance was charismatic and that the presentation did a strong job highlighting the diversity of the brand, showcasing all the Australian Gold products in the final shot, despite feeling that the product should have been highlighted earlier on in the video.
- Losing team: Plan B
- Reasons for loss: Despite enjoying Gary Busey's presentation and Lisa Rinna's performance, the executives felt that the ad didn't showcase the product enough, in particular failing to showcase the diversity of the offerings.
- Sent to boardroom: Gary Busey, Stephen Baldwin, Penn Jillette
- Fired: Stephen Baldwin – for directing the commercial and failing to include more of the product, and also Trump disliked the fact that Stephen called Gary Busey an "amazing" project manager only to backpedal once it became clear the firing decision was between the two of them.
- Notes:
  - Trace Adkins initially seemed disinterested in the task, and came up with the idea for their video before even speaking to the Australian Gold executives. Despite this, he ultimately deferred to Lil Jon (who had already worked with the company during Celebrity Apprentice 4) and allowed him to take the creative lead on their video, while still using Trace's cowboy concept.
  - Trump singled out Marilu Henner and Lisa Rinna for praise during the episode, for vastly improving their track records over their original appearances on the show (Marilu lost seven out of eight tasks in Celebrity Apprentice along with losing twice as project manager, while Lisa was fired in just the second episode of Celebrity Apprentice 4). As a result of Power's victory, Marilu at this point had the most task victories out of anyone in this season.
  - Trace won $40,000 for his charity, bringing his total up to over $700,000 for the season.
  - Trump dismissed Penn from the final boardroom after Gary stated that he should not be fired.
  - Power's victory ended the team's four-week losing streak.

=== Episode 8: Are You My Zulu Dancing Man? ===
Task 8

- Air Date: April 21, 2013
- Task Scope: The players are tasked to promote an interactive travel expo for South Africa Tourism.
- Power project manager: Brande Roderick
- Plan B project manager: Penn Jillette
- Judges: Donald Trump, Bret Michaels, George Ross
- Dramatic tension: At the task briefing, the teams were each offered one of two themes – "Adventure" or "Romance". Both wanted Adventure, with Lil Jon in particular pushing for Power to take that theme, and Power ended up winning it via a coin flip. The team intended to highlight safari, but to their shock the tourism executives forbade them from using it in their campaign because "everyone knows about it already," leaving them scrambling to find workable alternative ideas. Plan B also had trouble figuring out how to make their theme work, and were further hindered by Gary Busey's lack of focus on the task, leading to Penn Jillette realising that he and Lisa Rinna couldn't possibly organize the expo by themselves, and so Penn was forced to bring in some contacts to help set it up.
- Winning team: Plan B
- Reasons for win: The executives were incredibly impressed with the authenticity of the expo, commenting that it was like actually being in the country, and by Penn Jillette's ability to bring in world-famous South African musicians, five star South African food, and real Zulu dancers. While they felt that the expo was a little generic and didn't highlight any specific destinations or activities, 75% of the attendees felt Plan B's expo to be the better of the two.
- Losing team: Power
- Reasons for loss: Though the executives appreciated the team's energy and the brochures created by Marilu Henner, they felt that some of the aspects of the expo, like the chair ride of zip-lining and the performer in the shark suit, were as "juvenile in an amusement park" and not up to the high standards set by Plan B. The team ended up getting just 25% of the votes from the attendees.
- Sent to boardroom: Brande Roderick, Marilu Henner, Trace Adkins
- Trump's thoughts: After Trump asked Brande a second time if she wanted to bring Lil Jon back instead of Trace and Marilu, who both weren't responsible for the loss, she still declined to bring him back, arguing she was loyal to Lil Jon because they were original Team Power members. Trump felt this was almost as big of a mistake as La Toya Jackson's refusal to bring back Omarosa earlier in the season, and while Trace admitted that Lil Jon couldn't have predicted that the executives would disallow the usage of safari, he and Marilu still said that they would have brought him back. As a result, Brande's fate was sealed.
- Fired: Brande Roderick – for failing to bring Lil Jon back in to the boardroom when he was responsible for picking the losing theme. In addition, Trump thought she had a hard time defending herself against Marilu and Trace, and had lost her drive for the task after their original idea was quashed by the executives.
- Notes:
  - This is the first time a fired candidate (Bret Michaels) is brought back by Trump to be one of the judges.
  - Penn Jillette won $20,000 for his charity.
  - Trump gave $20,000 to Brande Roderick's charity after she was fired, as both Trace Adkins and Marilu Henner both said that she deserved to win money for her charity.
  - Lisa Rinna was particularly effusive in her praise for Penn Jillette, calling him brilliant and suggesting that she would rather be up against anyone but him in future events.
  - After Brande's firing, Lil Jon was now the only remaining candidate of the original Power members in the final six, causing Bret Michaels to joke that he messed up his team selection in the first episode.
  - Since Brande Roderick was fired, there are now no more Celebrity Apprentice 2 contestants remaining on the show.

=== Episode 9: Ahab's in Charge, and He's Gone Mad ===
Task 9

Air Date: April 28, 2013

- Task Scope: The celebrities are tasked to write, produce, and direct a demonstrational 90 second video for LG's Smart Home and Home Entertainment Systems.
- Power project manager: Lil Jon
- Plan B project manager: Gary Busey
- Judges: Donald Trump, Ivanka Trump, Joan Rivers
- Dramatic tension: On Plan B, Penn and Lisa struggled to get Gary's attention while brainstorming ideas, and Gary ultimately decided on an idea whereby his character would suddenly think he was a robotic dog. Penn and Lisa couldn't understand this idea at all, and asked Gary to change it, but he was adamant on using it. This led to much friction between Gary and his teammates for the remainder of the task. Things generally ran much smoother on Power, though Lil Jon and Trace Adkins felt that Marilu Henner was distracting and excessively nitpicky during their edit.
- Winning team: Power
- Reasons for win: The executive thought that Lil Jon's commercial effectively presented the product and its many uses and particularly praised Marilu Henner for her presentation, understanding of the product, and performance in the commercial.
- Losing team: Plan B
- Reasons for loss: While the judges thought that Penn Jillette demonstrated strong understanding of the product and appreciated Gary Busey's enthusiasm, the advert itself didn't highlight many of the product features, and the judges disliked Gary's "mechanical dog" concept, feeling that it was confusing and very inappropriate.
- Sent to boardroom: No final boardroom
- Fired: Gary Busey – for not listening to his teammates, poor performance as a project leader, failing to highlight the features of the LG products, and taking responsibility for the confused concept that the executive disliked. Gary felt that Lisa showed him a lack of respect and that neither of his teammates supported him throughout the whole task, but Lisa and Penn defended each other and Trump felt the responsibility for the loss ultimately fell on Gary's shoulders.
- Notes:
  - Lil Jon won $40,000 for his charity, with the executive from LG announcing that they would donate $1 (up to an additional $35,000) for every share on Facebook their video received.
  - LG also donated a full set of its products to the charity of each celebrity, a donation totaling over $100,000.
  - Trace Adkins was accused of not contributing to the task or the presentation by the judges and of flying under the radar by Trump, though Lil Jon defended him by pointing out that Trace had been responsible for overseeing the editing of the advert and helping his team avoid facing a severe time crunch.
  - After this episode, Lil Jon and Omarosa are the only original Team Power members to have won as project manager this season. All other successful project managers were all members of Plan B. Conversely, Dee Snider and Gary Busey are the only Plan B members to have lost as project manager.

=== Episode 10: The Mayor of Stress Town ===
Task 10

Air Date: May 5, 2013

- Task Scope: The All-Stars are asked to design a Foxwoods Resort themed suite and host a party at the brand-new Barclays Center.
- Power project manager: Marilu Henner
- Plan B project manager: Lisa Rinna
- Judges: Donald Trump, John Rich, Donald Trump Jr.
- Tension: During planning, Marilu's controlling behavior got on Trace's nerves and he had a fit of frustration as she wouldn't consider his or Lil Jon's ideas. This led to some friction on Power which caused Trace to shut down for the majority of the task. Plan B had much better teamwork; but it all threatened to derail when a major snowstorm had Lisa and Penn coming up with another plan in case their entertainment guest (including Penn's partner Teller) couldn't make it
- Winning team: Plan B
- Reasons for win: The executives thought that the attention to detail in the suite was incredible, and appreciated the celebrities that Penn Jillette drew into the suite, including Teller, David Burke (who created praiseworthy joker-themed food), and Lisa Lampanelli. John Rich further thought the team was right to pick the "Joker" theme with Penn on the team.
- Losing team: Power
- Reasons for loss: The executives thought the "King" theme was executed somewhat theatrically, that the suite didn't capture the fun and excitement of Foxwoods Resort, and that the chess game was out of place. John Rich further thought the team missed out by not emphasizing Lil Jon, who is the "King of Crunk."
- Sent to boardroom: No final boardroom
- Fired: Marilu Henner – for being project manager and making a number of decisions the Foxwoods executives didn't like, including picking the theatrical decor and including the chess game in the suite. Marilu tried to accuse Trace of checking out and Lil Jon of not procuring a DJ, but despite questioning Trace's motivation, Trump didn't feel that either of the men was to blame and that the onus for the loss fell on Marilu, who had creative control throughout the task.
- Notes:
  - Special appearances are made by David Burke, LuAnn de Lesseps, Hunter Hayes, Lisa Lampanelli, and Teller.
  - Lisa Rinna won $100,000 for her charity.
  - For the second time in two weeks, Trace Adkins was called out for being surly and not trying hard enough in the tasks, though this time Trace admitted to acting silly to get on Marilu's nerves.
  - At the end of the episode, the Final Four is established, with Lil Jon and Trace Adkins landing their second appearance as semi-finalists and Penn Jillette and particularly Lisa Rinna improving drastically upon their past performances.
  - Lisa Rinna is now the last female candidate left in the season; in her original season, she was the first woman fired.

=== Episode 11: May the Spoon Be With You ===
Final Four

Air Date: May 12, 2013

- Task Scope: The semi-finalists will be called into the boardroom to fight for their lives, with Trump firing two of them (one from each team) at the beginning of the episode.
- Fired:
  - Lisa Rinna – for being unanimously deemed the weakest member of the final four by the other three contestants, and because Trump felt that she had heavily relied on Penn Jillette for both of her victories as project manager (despite Penn himself defending her on this point). However, Trump and all the other competitors gave her huge credit for her performance this season after her inferior appearance on Celebrity Apprentice 4.
  - Lil Jon – for having an inferior overall track record (3–7) and having raised less money than Trace Adkins, and for being the only member of the final four to have done worse in this season than in their original appearance on the show (with a 1–1 record as project manager, in comparison to the 2–0 record he had as project manager in Celebrity Apprentice 4).
- Finalists: Penn Jillette & Trace Adkins

Task 11

- Task Scope: The finalists are challenged to create a new flavor of Walgreens Delish brand premium ice cream, produce a promotional video, and raise money for a launch event featuring the new flavors.
- Power project manager: Trace Adkins
  - Charity: American Red Cross
  - Team: Lil Jon, Gary Busey, Marilu Henner
- Plan B project manager: Penn Jillette
  - Charity: Opportunity Village
  - Team: Lisa Rinna, La Toya Jackson, Dennis Rodman
- Judges: Donald Trump, Ivanka Trump, Joan Rivers
- Notes:
  - Mr. Trump will fire two contestants before the final tasks begins, marking the second time since Celebrity Apprentice 3 that a contestant will be fired before a task begins.
  - Six previously fired contestants will come to assist the two finalists, with three per team.
  - This will be the first part of the final task, with the second part airing on May 19, 2013.
  - Trump gave Lil Jon $20,000 for his charity before firing him because of his performance throughout the show and for strongly believing in his cause.
  - As with his previous appearance on the show, Lil Jon was fired as a semi finalist prior to the finals.
  - With this episode, Trace has become the only candidate in the history of the show to make it to the finals more than once.
  - For the second time in Celebrity Apprentice history, Trump picked the teams for the finalists rather than letting them choose.
  - After Lil Jon's firing, there are no more original Team Power members remaining. Both finalists are from the same team (Plan B).
  - Since Lil Jon was fired, there are no more contestants from Celebrity Apprentice 4.
  - This is the first task whereas none of the finalists has lost a task as project manager. Trace Adkins(in season 1), Holly Robinson Peete, Joan Rivers, John Rich, Piers Morgan, Clay Aiken and Marlee Matlin have lost at least once and ended up in the Final Two.

=== Episode 12: One of Us Will Win, But Not by Much ===
Air Date: May 19, 2013

- The Celebrity Apprentice: Trace Adkins
- Reasons for win: Ivanka Trump praised Trace Adkins on his leadership abilities and for having been the top earner throughout the entire season.
- Runner-up: Penn Jillette
- Reasons for loss: Even though Penn sold more ice cream and arguably had the edge in certain creative aspects of the final task, Trace ultimately brought in more money overall, and Penn's campaign wasn't so much better that it could override this fact. Also, prior to announcing Trace as the winner, Penn was criticized for negative comments made in his book about the Celebrity Apprentice and Donald Trump.
- Notes:
  - Penn raised $503,655 and Trace raised $564,000 (although he actually raised $664,000 but the money donated by Tim Tebow didn't count as it was late according to Joan Rivers). As promised, Walgreens gave the finalist whose ice cream sold more an extra $100,000 for his charity, which was Penn's ice cream.
  - This was the second part of the final task, with the first part airing on May 12, 2013.
  - Special appearances were made by Gilbert Gottfried, Blue Man Group, Taylor Hicks, Wayne Newton, George Wallace, Teller, The Oak Ridge Boys, Thompson Square, Tim Tebow, Billy Ray Cyrus, Wynonna Judd, Tony Stewart, and Vincent Pastore.
  - Trump gave La Toya, Dennis, and Gary $20,000 each for their work in the final task and because they had won no money. This left Claudia Jordan as the only celebrity from this season not to have earned any money from either of her two appearances on Celebrity Apprentice.
  - Before announcing the winner, Trump gave Lil Jon $100,000 for believing greatly in his cause against diabetes, which led to Lil Jon's mother's death after the filming of the season.
  - Bret Michaels was not present at the live reunion, as he was attending his daughter Raine's 13th birthday party.
  - During the live finale there was a major blowout between Omarosa and La Toya Jackson about Michael Clarke Duncan's death and the lawsuit that Omarosa will file to La Toya, which forced Gary Busey to step in to prevent the two from coming to blows. Claudia Jordan also made strongly negative comments about Omarosa, despite the two seemingly having gotten along well at the start of the season.
  - Trace Adkins is now the show's all-time top earner, beating out John Rich's performance from Celebrity Apprentice 4. However, he narrowly fell short of beating that season's runner-up Marlee Matlin for the most money raised in a single week, earning $814,000 including the prize (and $914,000 including the disallowed money from Tim Tebow) as compared to the $1,000,000 that Matlin earned in the fifth week of Celebrity Apprentice 4.
  - Walgreens have since stated that they will continue to sell the two ice cream flavors created by the finalists' teams.

== Legacy ==
Omarosa served as Director of African-American Outreach for Trump's presidential campaign in 2016, and once he was elected, she was part of his transition team, and later was hired as Director of Communications for the Office of Public Liaison within the White House. However, she resigned from the position in January 2018, after which she wrote a book called Unhinged: An Insider's Account of the Trump White House, documenting her experiences with Trump. Among claims in the book is that Trump repeatedly used the "n-word" during filming of this season of The Celebrity Apprentice alongside other racially-insensitive language. Trump reported to this charges that series producer Mark Burnett had reviewed the tapes from production and had not found any such use of that language. Jillette, one of the show's celebrity contestants, countered this claim, stating that he had been in the same room at the time as Trump had said "racially insensitive things that made [Jillette] uncomfortable".

In November 2018, Trump denied knowing Lil Jon, despite Lil Jon appearing on two separate seasons of The Celebrity Apprentice (seasons 11 and 13).
