= The Apprentice (American TV series) season 14 =

The Apprentice
- Season 14
- No. of contestants: 16
- Winner: Leeza Gibbons
- Runner-up: Geraldo Rivera
- No. of episodes: 9

Release
- Original network: NBC
- Original release: January 4 – February 16, 2015

Season chronology
- ← Previous; Season 13 Next → Season 15

The Celebrity Apprentice 7 (also known as The Apprentice 14) is the seventh installment of the reality game show, The Celebrity Apprentice. Despite this season having long concluded filming in early 2014, it premiered on Sunday, January 4, 2015. As a result of the significant time between the season's filming and its airing, numerous spoilers were released. The season aired more than a year and a half after the conclusion of the previous season. This was Donald Trump's final season as host as he was replaced by Arnold Schwarzenegger amidst Trump's campaign for the U.S. presidency in advance of the 2016 election.

Shortly following the death of The Celebrity Apprentice 2 winner, Joan Rivers, Trump revealed that Rivers was one of his advisors for two episodes of this (then-upcoming) season (specifically as a judge in episodes 4 and 6).

The season had 16 cast members. Leeza Gibbons was the winner, while Geraldo Rivera was the runner-up.

== Candidates ==
Celebrity	Background	Original team	Age	Hometown	Charity	Result	Raised
Leeza Gibbons	Talk show host	Infinity	57	Irmo, South Carolina	Leeza's Care Connection	The Celebrity Apprentice (02–16–15)	$714,000
Geraldo Rivera	Journalist & talk show host	Vortex	71	West Babylon, New York	Life's WORC	Fired in the Season Finale (02–16–15)	$726,000
Vivica A. Fox	Film & television actress	Infinity	50	Indianapolis, Indiana	Best Buddies International	Fired in task 12 (02–09–15)	$50,000
Brandi Glanville	The Real Housewives of Beverly Hills star	Infinity	41	Sacramento, California	Make-A-Wish Foundation	Fired in task 11 (02–02–15)	$50,000
Johnny Damon	MLB outfielder	Vortex	41	Orlando, Florida	The Johnny Damon Foundation	Fired in task 11 (02–02–15)	$40,000
Ian Ziering	Beverly Hills, 90210 actor	Vortex	50	West Orange, New Jersey	EB Medical Research Foundation	Fired in task 11 (02–02–15)	$320,000
Kenya Moore	Miss USA 1993 & The Real Housewives of Atlanta star	Infinity	43	Detroit, Michigan	Detroit Public Schools Foundation	Fired in task 10 (02–02–15)	$20,000
Kate Gosselin	Reality television star & author	Infinity	39	Philadelphia, Pennsylvania	Camp Barnabas	Fired in task 9 (01–26–15)	$40,000
Sig Hansen	Sea captain & Deadliest Catch star	Vortex	48	Shoreline, Washington	Coast Guard Foundation	Fired in task 8 (01–26–15)	$25,000
Lorenzo Lamas	Television actor	Vortex	56	Pacific Palisades, California	Boot Campaign	Fired in task 7 (01–19–15)	
Shawn Johnson	Former Olympic artistic gymnast	Infinity	23	West Des Moines, Iowa	Character Counts in Iowa	Fired in task 6 (01–19–15)	
Terrell Owens	NFL wide receiver	Vortex	41	Alexander City, Alabama	Boys & Girls Clubs of America	Fired in task 5 (01–12–15)	
Jamie Anderson	Olympic snowboarder	Infinity	24	South Lake Tahoe, California	Protect Our Winters	Fired in task 4 (01–12–15)	
Gilbert Gottfried	Stand-up comedian & actor	Vortex	59	Brooklyn, New York	Autism Speaks	Fired in task 3 (01–05–15)	
Kevin Jonas	Jonas Brothers guitarist	Vortex	27	Wyckoff, New Jersey	Convoy of Hope	Fired in task 2 (01–05–15)	
Keshia Knight Pulliam	Television actress	Infinity	35	Middleburg, Virginia	Kamp Kizzy	Fired in task 1 (01–04–15)	$25,000

== Weekly results ==
Candidate	Original team	Task 5 team	Task 9 team	Task 11 team	Final Task team	Application result	Record as project manager
Leeza Gibbons	Infinity	Infinity	Infinity	Vortex	Infinity	The Celebrity Apprentice	2–0 (win in tasks 7 & 11)
Geraldo Rivera	Vortex	Vortex	Vortex	Vortex	Vortex	Fired in the season finale	2–0 (win in tasks 1 & 5)
Vivica A. Fox	Infinity	Vortex	Vortex	Vortex	Vortex	Fired in task 12	1–1 (win in task 3, loss in task 6)
Brandi Glanville	Infinity	Infinity	Infinity	Infinity	Infinity	Fired in task 11	1–1 (win in task 8, loss in task 11)
Johnny Damon	Vortex	Infinity	Infinity	Infinity	Infinity	Fired in task 11	2–0 (win in tasks 4 & 10)
Ian Ziering	Vortex	Infinity	Infinity	Infinity	Vortex	Fired in task 11	1–1 (win in task 9, loss in task 5)
Kenya Moore	Infinity	Infinity	Vortex			Fired in task 10	1–1 (win in task 6, loss in task 10)
Kate Gosselin	Infinity	Vortex	Vortex			Fired in task 9	1–1 (win in task 2, loss in task 9)
Sig Hansen	Vortex	Vortex				Fired in task 8	0–1 (loss in task 8)
Lorenzo Lamas	Vortex	Vortex			Vortex	Fired in task 7	0–1 (loss in task 7)
Shawn Johnson	Infinity	Vortex				Fired in task 6	
Terrell Owens	Vortex	Infinity				Fired in task 5	0–1 (loss in task 3)
Jamie Anderson	Infinity					Fired in task 4	0–1 (loss in task 4)
Gilbert Gottfried	Vortex					Fired in task 3	
Kevin Jonas	Vortex				Infinity	Fired in task 2	0–1 (loss in task 2)
Keshia Knight Pulliam	Infinity					Fired in task 1	0–1 (loss in task 1)

Elimination chart
No.	Candidate	1	2	3	4	5	6	7	8	9	10	11	12	13
1	Leeza	IN	IN	IN	IN	IN	IN	WIN	IN	IN	IN	WIN	IN	CA
2	Geraldo	WIN	BR	BR	IN	WIN	IN	IN	IN	IN	IN	IN	IN	FIRED
3	Vivica	IN	IN	WIN	IN	IN	LOSE	IN	IN	IN	IN	IN	FIRED	
4	Brandi	IN	IN	IN	IN	IN	IN	IN	WIN	IN	IN	FIRED		
5	Johnny	IN	IN	IN	WIN	BR	IN	IN	IN	IN	WIN	FIRED		
6	Ian	IN	BR	IN	IN	LOSE	IN	IN	IN	WIN	IN	FIRED		
7	Kenya	IN	IN	IN	BR	IN	WIN	IN	IN	IN	FIRED			
8	Kate	BR	WIN	IN	BR	IN	BR	IN	IN	FIRED				
9	Sig	IN	IN	IN	IN	IN	IN	IN	FIRED					
10	Lorenzo	IN	IN	IN	IN	IN	IN	FIRED						
11	Shawn	IN	IN	IN	IN	IN	FIRED							
12	Terrell	IN	IN	LOSE	IN	FIRED								
13	Jamie	BR	IN	IN	FIRED									
14	Gilbert	IN	IN	FIRED										
15	Kevin	IN	FIRED											
16	Keshia	FIRED												

The candidate was on the winning team.
The candidate was on the losing team.
The candidate won the competition and was named the Celebrity Apprentice.
The candidate won as project manager on his/her team.
The candidate lost as project manager on his/her team.
The candidate was on the losing team and brought to the final boardroom.
The candidate was fired.
The candidate lost as project manager and was fired.
The candidate did not participate in the task.

== Episodes ==
=== Episode 1: "May the Gods of Good Pies Be With Us!" ===
Task 1

- Air Date: January 4, 2015
- Task Scope: Teams must create and sell pies.
- Infinity Project Manager: Keshia Knight Pulliam
- Vortex Project Manager: Geraldo Rivera
- Judges: Donald Trump, Ivanka Trump, and Piers Morgan
- Winning team: Vortex
- Reasons for win: Vortex raised $185,322.
- Losing team: Infinity
- Reasons for loss: Despite winning a $25,000 bonus for having the best pie as judged by Buddy Valastro, the women failed to bring in notable donors and only raised $93,862 as a result. Keisha was also considered a mediocre project manager due to her failure to give clear direction.
- Sent to boardroom: Keshia Knight Pulliam, Jamie Anderson, Kate Gosselin
- Fired: Keshia Knight Pulliam – for her lackluster leadership, not calling Bill Cosby for money, and for bringing in Jamie Anderson despite her being responsible for the pie recipe, which earned them a $25,000 bonus.
- Notes:
  - This episode was filmed before it got more widely known that Bill Cosby was accused of sexual assault by a number of women.
  - On the men's team, after coming up with the name Vortex, Geraldo Rivera was chosen as Project Manager, even though Kevin Jonas felt he had pushed himself and his ideas onto the rest of the team. On the women's team, Keshia Knight Pulliam suggested the name Trojan Horse, which was rejected because of its association with condoms. Brandi Glanville suggested Gold as there were two Olympic medalists on the team, but Kenya Moore's suggestion of Infinity was chosen. Keshia then volunteered to be Project Manager.
  - Both teams concentrated on social media to spread the word that they were selling pies. Keshia assigned Shawn Johnson and Brandi Glanville to oversee it for the women's team. In the boardroom, Piers Morgan felt that both teams, but the women's in particular, should have concentrated more on calling big donors for money, especially since it was revealed Kevin Jonas had more Twitter followers individually than the women's team combined.
  - Each team had to make a sweet pie and a savory pie. The men's team chose to go with a chocolate-vanilla layer pie suggested by Kevin and a low-calorie chicken pot pie suggested by Lorenzo Lamas. The women's team chose a pear-blueberry pie suggested by Jamie Anderson and an enchilada pie suggested by Keshia.
  - During the making of the pies, Kevin felt Geraldo ignored the men who were in the kitchen to concentrate on raising money. Additionally, Sig Hansen burned a batch of 600 pies. On the women's team, Jamie Anderson and Kate Gosselin took charge of making the pies since Keshia offered no clear direction.
  - Gilbert Gottfried was able to secure comedic entertainment for the crowd.
  - Celebrities such as Sean Hannity, Maria Menounos, and Joe Piscopo showed up to donate money. Additionally, former contestant Claudia Jordan came to the women's store with the intention of smashing a pie in Kenya Moore's face, but Kenya smashed a pie in Brandi Glanville's face, who then retaliated.
  - Piers Morgan, upon visiting the teams, felt the women's store was chaotic with no clear direction, and expressed concern that Geraldo did not have a handle on what was actually coming in.
  - Buddy Valastro, the star of Cake Boss, judged each team's pies. He felt that the men's savory pie needed salt, and ended up tasting one of the sweet pies that had been burned by Sig Hansen. On the women's team, he felt the savory pie had too many flavors for a pie, but thought that their sweet pie was excellent. It was revealed in the boardroom that Buddy had chosen the women to receive the $25,000 bonus from Toshiba.
  - In the boardroom, it was revealed that, on the men's team, Geraldo raised the most, while Lorenzo Lamas raised the least, with only $100. Additionally, Terrell Owens only raised $750. On the women's team, Leeza Gibbons raised the most, while Kate Gosselin was unable to raise any money.
  - Shawn Johnson stated in the boardroom that she did not believe the women raised enough money to win. Kate stated that Keshia was a poor Project Manager because she did not give any clear direction; Piers agreed.
  - Geraldo did not know the amounts raised by each person on the team, which Donald Trump found surprising given his journalistic background.
  - When the women's team was left behind, Kate and Kenya Moore expressed concerns over Keshia's role as Project Manager. Kate said Keshia had good intentions, but could have done better, while Kenya told Donald that Keshia had failed to call Bill Cosby, which Donald said could have made the difference between the women's winning and losing.
  - In the final boardroom, Keshia was called out by Ivanka Trump for bringing back Jamie Anderson, who was responsible for the pear-blueberry pie which won them $25,000, and then claiming Jamie had raised less than $5,000.
  - Before firing Keshia, Donald gave her charity $25,000.
  - It marked the first time on any celebrity version of The Apprentice, and the third and final time across all 14 seasons, in which the losing project manager was fired for the first task, and only the fourth time overall that the losing project manager had been fired after a fundraising task (the first being Omarosa in Celebrity Apprentice 1, the second Tom Green in Celebrity Apprentice 2, and the third La Toya Jackson in Celebrity Apprentice 4). Usually Trump's policy of never firing the top fundraiser in any task is enough to save the project manager, but Keshia was only the fourth-highest fundraiser on the team. Piers pointed out that it had been somewhat foolish to volunteer herself as project manager when she was limited in terms of fundraising ability.
  - Total money raised was $279,184, which was rounded to $280,000 for Geraldo's charity.

=== Episode 2: "Nobody Out Thinks Donald Trump" ===
Task 2

- Air Date: January 5, 2015
- Task Scope: Teams must produce and direct a commercial for the Neat Connect scanner and the Neat Cloud service.
- Infinity Project Manager: Kate Gosselin
- Vortex Project Manager: Kevin Jonas
- Judges: Donald Trump, Donald Trump Jr., and George Ross
- Task tension: On the men's team, Geraldo Rivera was deliberately excluded by Kevin from the commercial's planning in favor of Ian Ziering and Lorenzo Lamas. Geraldo was later given the task of writing the script, but became angry again upon finding out that Sig Hansen had asked Mike Rowe to narrate the commercial, rather than Geraldo. On the women's team, Leeza Gibbons and Brandi Glanville initially took charge of the commercial, but Kate saw Brandi as a distraction and excluded her from the further production stages. In the boardroom, Kate stated Brandi was the weakest player on the women's team due to her being a distraction. Geraldo said Kevin Jonas was a good PM, but slighted him even though he had experience in production.
- Winning team: Infinity
- Reasons for win: Even though they lacked in targeting their marketing-audience, the executives liked the women's brand messaging and the overall concept better, along with the fact that their commercial starred Vivica A. Fox as the "Neatologist", the product's mascot.
- Losing team: Vortex
- Reasons for loss: Despite Gilbert being a brilliant character in their commercial and the men adding more celebrities to their video than the women did, the executives disliked that the brand messaging of the logo wasn't included in the commercial and felt the product integration didn't go far enough.
- Sent to boardroom: Kevin Jonas, Geraldo Rivera, Ian Ziering
- Fired: Kevin Jonas – for trying to "outthink Mr. Trump" by bringing Ian Ziering back as an advocate, rather than Lorenzo Lamas, who was chiefly responsible for Vortex's theme and advert, in an attempt to get Geraldo Rivera fired.
- Notes:
  - Kenya Moore did not participate in the first half of this task due to a previous engagement.
  - Kevin Jonas was chosen as Project Manager because he was the most tech savvy, while Kate Gosselin volunteered for the role, despite having little understanding of the product, mostly because she wanted to prove herself after being accused of a lack of contribution in the previous task. Despite Infinity's victory, Kate's work as project manager received a poor reception from her teammates, who near unanimously agreed that she deserved little (if any) credit for the win.
  - Kate Gosselin won $40,000 for her charity.
  - During the initial boardroom, Geraldo Rivera attempted to take responsibility for having Gilbert in the commercial, even though it was Kevin Jonas's idea; the other men called him out on it. Kevin blamed Geraldo for the team's loss, since his script did not cover the Neat Cloud service, but both Donald, Jr. and George criticized him for not changing the script accordingly as PM.
  - Trump and his advisers were particularly puzzled by Kevin's decision to bring back Ian Ziering, and saw Kevin as trying to manipulate him into firing Geraldo. The women, who were watching in their suite, were also surprised by this choice. Trump tried to convince Ian that Kevin should be fired for bringing him back, but Ian stood behind Kevin. Ultimately, Trump fired Kevin anyway.

Task 3

- Air Date: January 5, 2015
- Task Scope: Teams must create a presentation for the frozen food product line Luvo.
- Infinity Project Manager: Vivica A. Fox
- Vortex Project Manager: Terrell Owens
- Judges: Donald Trump, Ivanka Trump, and Eric Trump
- Task tension: Vivica A. Fox assigned Kate Gosselin and Shawn Johnson to retrieve props for their presentation, and was upset when they took six hours to secure the needed props, since this left no time to rehearse. Shawn also did not feel good due to her menstrual cycle. The women's service was not as smooth, with large gaps between the service of each dish. At one point, Kenya Moore, who was trying to get the food out on time, angered Jamie Anderson by asking her for a plate which was not ready. Terrell Owens asked all the men to come up with a script for their parts of the presentation, but Gilbert Gottfried refused and insisted he would improvise during the presentation itself, much to Terrell's annoyance.
- Winning team: Infinity
- Reasons for win: Despite the inefficiency of the service (which resulted in some of the food being cold), the women had better brand messaging, produced a consistent lifestyle in the presentation, and the executives complimented Leeza for her solid presentation. The team's "Love Yourself One Bite at a Time" slogan was also considered to be very good.
- Losing team: Vortex
- Reasons for loss: While the men had proficient service and represented their celebrity personas, the executives felt the slogan ("Eat Lean, Live Long, Eat Luvo for a Delicious Life") was both dull and too long, and that the team could have emphasized more lifestyle in their presentation. However, the primary reason for the loss was stated to be the sex jokes that Gilbert Gottfried told during his segment, which the executives considered very inappropriate and off-color, and deemed to have instantly destroyed the men's presentation.
- Sent to boardroom: Terrell Owens, Gilbert Gottfried, Geraldo Rivera
- Fired: Gilbert Gottfried – for including inappropriate jokes in his presentation to the executives and the audience, and showing a lack of desire to remain in the process.
- Notes:
  - In the boardroom, Terrell Owens believed his team's presentation, except for Gilbert's portion, was well liked by the executives. Vivica A. Fox also expressed confidence, but cited Shawn Johnson as the weakest link because of her menstrual issue; it upset Shawn because she felt it was a personal matter that should have not been discussed with Donald Trump. Jamie also said Kenya was rude due to the incident in the kitchen, but Kenya stated that her family owned a restaurant, so Jamie just didn't know what to expect as much as she did.
  - Vivica A. Fox won $50,000 for her charity.
  - Similar to season 12, during the Buick task, Gilbert's sex jokes actually received laughs and laughter can be heard for a split second before the shot changed to show the executives looking with shock and disgust.
  - In the final boardroom, Trump only briefly questioned Terrell Owens and Geraldo Rivera on why they should stay, and mostly about their desire to remain in the process, indicating that Gilbert Gottfried was considered so obviously at fault for the loss that he would only survive if Terrell or Geraldo were to quit. On top of it all, Gilbert effectively admitted that his heart was no longer fully in the show.

=== Episode 3: "A Family Affair" ===
Task 4

- Air Date: January 12, 2015
- U.S. viewers (in millions): 5.85
- Task Scope: The teams must create a fitness magazine advertisement for Cosmopolitan.
- Infinity Project Manager: Jamie Anderson
- Vortex Project Manager: Johnny Damon
- Judges: Donald Trump, Donald Trump Jr., and Ivanka Trump
- Winning team: Vortex
- Reasons for win: The team made strong use of their celebrity, and the Cosmopolitan team especially liked the "selfie" theme that Geraldo Rivera came up with. The overall layout of their advert was also good, despite a few minor criticisms.
- Losing team: Infinity
- Reasons for loss: The advert the team created was felt to be somewhat disjointed, and the theme not nearly as cohesive as Vortex's. The photographs were also felt to be a little too conservative, and not to have used the celebrities as well as they could have.
- Sent to boardroom: Jamie Anderson, Kenya Moore, Kate Gosselin
- Fired: Jamie Anderson – for not bringing back Brandi Glanville, who was the one responsible for the concept, and for not taking control as Project manager.
- Notes:
  - While Geraldo Rivera was complimented for suggesting what turned out to be the task-winning concept, there was still disharmony between him and the other men, especially when he insisted on incorporating a shirtless picture of himself into the advert. He also objected to the length of a story that Ian Ziering added, though this was not brought up as an issue in the team's feedback.
  - In the final boardroom, Jamie Anderson pleaded with Trump to disregard her boardroom choice and fire Brandi Glanville anyway, claiming that he had done such a thing before. In fact however, as Trump himself pointed out to Jamie, he has never done that on The Apprentice, although Martha Stewart did do so during her Apprentice season.
  - The men who were watching it were confused and not very satisfied with Jamie's decision whom to bring back.
  - Johnny Damon won $20,000 for his charity.

Task 5

- Air Date: January 12, 2015
- U.S. viewers (in millions): 5.85
- Task Scope: The teams must sell wedding dresses for charity.
- Infinity Project Manager: Ian Ziering
- Vortex Project Manager: Geraldo Rivera
- Judges: Donald Trump, Donald Trump Jr., and Eric Trump
- Winning team: Vortex
- Reasons for win: Everyone on the team was able to bring in large amounts of money, and Geraldo Rivera in particular brought in a $100,000 donation. The team raised $294,780.
- Losing team: Infinity
- Reasons for loss: While Ian Ziering brought in the largest donation earned by either team ($165,000) and the three women on the team also brought in large donations, the team was ultimately let down by the performances of Terrell Owens and Johnny Damon, who brought in less than $20,000 between them. The team raised $292,547.
- Sent to boardroom: Ian Ziering, Terrell Owens, Johnny Damon
- Fired: Terrell Owens – for raising the least money on the team, and for admitting that Trump should fire him.
- Notes:
  - Donald switched the teams up with three women and three men on both teams. The new Infinity consisted of Ian Ziering, Johnny Damon, Kenya Moore, Brandi Glanville, Terrell Owens and Leeza Gibbons, while the new Vortex consisted of Geraldo Rivera, Shawn Johnson, Vivica A. Fox, Lorenzo Lamas, Kate Gosselin and Sig Hansen.
  - Brandi Glanville sat out a large part of the task after apparently suffering a panic attack and becoming physically ill. In the boardroom, Kenya Moore accused Brandi of making the whole thing up in order to avoid doing any work setting up the team's bridal boutique, but Brandi defended herself by pointing out that she had spent the time bringing in donors, and the results showed this to be true; Brandi was Infinity's second-highest earner after Ian Ziering.
  - Before announcing the results, Donald asked Geraldo and Ian if they would allow the opposing project manager to keep the money they earned, regardless of the outcome; both project managers agreed, despite the mutual animosity between the two. Trump also agreed to level off both their earnings to $300,000 apiece.

=== Episode 4: "I Wish I Had a Project Manager" ===
Task 6

- Air Date: January 19, 2015
- U.S. viewers (in millions):
- Task Scope: To produce an outdoor experience for Ivanka Trump's shoe brand, utilizing a mobile display.
- Infinity Project Manager: Kenya Moore
- Vortex Project Manager: Vivica A. Fox
- Judges: Donald Trump, Joan Rivers and Ivanka Trump
- Winning team: Infinity
- Reasons for win: The team's theme was felt to be integrated better, and Joan and Ivanka especially liked how informative their mobile display was.
- Losing team: Vortex
- Reasons for loss: While their experience got more footfall thanks to the free coffees on offer, and the display was felt to be well-presented overall, Ivanka felt that the outdoor part and the display weren't connected well enough, and that the branding and product information was a little lacking.
- Sent to boardroom: Vivica A. Fox, Kate Gosselin, Shawn Johnson
- Fired: Shawn Johnson – for not stepping up as the team's project manager despite being the most qualified to lead the task, and for holding back with an idea that Trump felt would have won the task.
- Notes:
  - Kenya Moore won $20,000 for her charity.
  - The date of the airing was Shawn Johnson's birthday; coincidentally she was fired.
  - Shawn was fired despite Vivica A. Fox calling her the stronger competitor between her and Kate Gosselin, as Trump felt that Kate still made more of an effort to step up and contribute to the tasks, whereas Shawn had tried to stay in the background throughout the season.

Task 7

- Air Date: January 19, 2015
- U.S. viewers (in millions):
- Task Scope: To produce viral videos for Chock full o'Nuts, using GoPro video cameras.
- Infinity Project Manager: Leeza Gibbons
- Vortex Project Manager: Lorenzo Lamas
- Judges: Donald Trump, Ivanka Trump and Eric Trump
- Winning team: Infinity
- Reasons for win: Despite concerns over the video's risqué content and weak brand messaging, the executives felt that Infinity's video was far more memorable and likely to go viral.
- Losing team: Vortex
- Reasons for loss: The executives didn't like Vortex's video at all, deeming it to be bland, boring and safe, as well as feeling more like a television commercial than a viral video. The only major positive noted was strong usage of the brand.
- Sent to boardroom: No final boardroom; Lorenzo Lamas said that he could not hold anyone else accountable for the loss, and refused to bring back two people.
- Fired: Lorenzo Lamas – for taking full responsibility for the loss as project manager. No-one on the team said they wanted him to be fired, but Trump could not pin the blame on anyone else.
- Notes:
  - Leeza Gibbons won $40,000 for her charity.
  - While Vivica A. Fox strongly indicated that Kate Gosselin was the weakest member of Vortex and deserved to be fired, Lorenzo Lamas refused to blame her or anyone else for the loss. Trump questioned Vivica on whether she had some vendetta against Kate; Vivica denied this, but re-iterated that she considered Kate to be by far the team's least valuable contributor.
  - At the end of the episode, a special tribute was paid to Joan Rivers.

=== Episode 5: "It's Like a Booze Cruise With Knowledge" ===
Task 8

- Air Date: January 26, 2015
- U.S. viewers (in millions):
- Task Scope: To run a tour of the New York coastline aboard a boat.
- Infinity Project Manager: Brandi Glanville
- Vortex Project Manager: Sig Hansen
- Judges: Donald Trump, Donald Trump Jr. and Eric Trump
- Winning team: Infinity
- Reasons for win: Their tour was near-unanimously regarded as very entertaining, and Leeza Gibbons' talk was felt to be funny and informative. The only major problems were the lack of a cohesive theme, and Kenya Moore performing an inappropriately sexy dance.
- Losing team: Vortex
- Reasons for loss: Sig Hansen brought in Hooters girls to run their events, resulting in overwhelmingly negative feedback from the female guests, who felt they were overlooked. Geraldo Rivera's talk was also felt to be too dry and jingoistic.
- Sent to boardroom: No final boardroom; Trump felt that Sig Hansen was the overwhelmingly obvious choice to be fired, given that all the criticisms of the tour (barring only Geraldo's talk) were ultimately his responsibility.
- Fired: Sig Hansen – for choosing an unpopular theme for the tour, and for losing badly on a task that he was the most qualified to lead.
- Notes:
  - Brandi Glanville won $50,000 for her charity.
  - Before firing him, Trump gave Sig's charity $25,000.
  - Geraldo Rivera pledged $40,000 to Sig's charity.

Task 9

- Air Date: January 26, 2015
- U.S. viewers (in millions):
- Task Scope: Producing a promotional event for the Trump National Doral golf club in Miami.
- Infinity Project Manager: Ian Ziering
- Vortex Project Manager: Kate Gosselin
- Judges: Donald Trump, Donald Trump Jr. and Eric Trump
- Winning team: Infinity
- Reasons for win: The team successfully identified and emphasized the luxury aspects of the Trump brand and had an overall very effective presentation, despite Ian Ziering showing a lack of knowledge of the club's facilities, and the team not doing enough to cater to families.
- Losing team: Vortex
- Reasons for loss: Despite a decent presentation, and the team creating a child-friendly mascot that Donald Jr. and Eric liked, their overall event wasn't up to the standard of Infinity's, and failed to properly demonstrate the luxury aspects of the brand.
- Sent to boardroom: No final boardroom; a huge argument flared up between Kenya Moore and Vivica A. Fox, with Kenya accusing Vivica of being ineffective on the task and wasting time shopping, and Vivica in turn calling Kenya's character and honesty into question. However, Trump felt that both women were capable of being led, and that Kate Gosselin's passiveness in the boardroom was proof that she lacked the strength of character to control them.
- Fired: Kate Gosselin – for being unable to control the arguments between Vivica A. Fox and Kenya Moore, and for being ultimately responsible for the loss through her failure to identify the luxury aspects of Trump's brand.
- Notes:
  - Ian Ziering won $20,000 for his charity.
  - Trump moved Kenya Moore to Vortex to even out the teams.
  - This is Vortex's fourth loss in a row.
  - With Ian's win, every remaining candidate has won at least once as project manager.
  - Despite the two having feuded from the very start of the season, Vivica A. Fox admitted that she was upset to see Kate Gosselin fired, and that she would have much preferred Kenya Moore to have gone instead.

=== Episode 6: "Who Stole My Phone?" ===
Task 10

- Air Date: February 2, 2015
- U.S. viewers (in millions):
- Task Scope: To create an advertising campaign for King's Hawaiian bread.
- Infinity Project Manager: Johnny Damon
- Vortex Project Manager: Kenya Moore
- Judges: Donald Trump, Donald Trump Jr., and Eric Trump
- Task tension: On Vortex, Vivica A. Fox felt sidelined from the creativity with the amount of work inputs held by Kenya Moore & Geraldo Rivera.
- Winning team: Infinity
- Reasons for win: Ian Ziering managed to secure a helicopter from which the team got aerial photographs of New York City, and inserted the King's Hawaiian products into famous landmarks of the city; the executives loved the resulting imagery, and despite feeling that it needed to be tweaked a little, also liked the accompanying Twitter campaign.
- Losing team: Vortex
- Reasons for loss: Despite having solid brand messaging, the theme that Kenya Moore decided on, building the campaign around women's backsides, was felt to be risky and attention-grabbing, but inappropriate for the company's family-friendly image. The executives also vehemently disliked an image featuring a young child reaching for a woman's backside, accompanied by the phrase "Babies luv Buns" (Geraldo Rivera and Vivica A. Fox had also objected to the image, but Kenya refused to listen to them).
- Sent to boardroom: No final boardroom, as only three team members remained.
  - Firing verdict: In the boardroom, Kenya Moore continued to make the vicious personal attacks she had made on Vivica A. Fox the previous week, and also brought up a Twitter message where Vivica seemingly admitted being old and unattractive, because she was going through menopause. Vivica denied making the tweet, saying that she couldn't have posted anything like that even if she wanted to since her phone had gone missing, but Donald, Jr. checked her feed and revealed that the tweet had in fact been posted. This resulted in a huge argument flaring up, with Vivica accusing Kenya of stealing her phone and posting the message, and Kenya in turn accusing Vivica of posting it herself to falsely incriminate her. Ultimately, while Trump, his sons and Geraldo Rivera agreed that it seemed likely that Kenya had posted the message, Trump decided that he could not fire her for it, as there was no actual proof that she was responsible. However, Trump felt that he had enough evidence to fire Kenya anyway, as the loss was her responsibility regardless.
- Fired: Kenya Moore – for coming up with a risky and inappropriate theme for the team's campaign, insisting on using the "Babies luv Buns" poster (which got an overwhelmingly negative reaction) over the objections of her team-mates, and for failing to help Vortex end their losing streak—which Trump had switched her over to Vortex to do.
- Notes:
  - Johnny Damon won $20,000 for his charity.
  - After Kenya Moore was fired, Vivica A. Fox angrily refused to say goodbye and stormed off. In her closing taxi ride, Kenya still denied having stolen Vivica's phone.

Task 11

- Air Date: February 2, 2015
- U.S. viewers (in millions):
- Task Scope: Producing and performing jingles for Budweiser and their ready-made margarita drinks.
- Infinity Project Manager: Brandi Glanville
- Vortex Project Manager: Leeza Gibbons
- Judges: Donald Trump, Joan Rivers and Eric Trump
- Winning team: Vortex
- Reasons for win: The feedback for the team's jingle was overwhelmingly positive, with the executives finding it catchy, memorable and well-suited to the product. In what Trump noted was a first for the show, the executives did not have even a single criticism for Vortex's performance.
- Losing team: Infinity
- Reasons for loss: While their jingle had solid product integration, the executives felt it was too wordy, far less memorable, and only had a very weak connection to the brand. The team also stumbled a little in their live performance.
- Sent to boardroom: No final boardroom, as only three team members remained.
- Fired: All of Infinity, for the following reasons:
  - Ian Ziering – for repeatedly complaining that Brandi didn't use his jingle (which actually turned out to be plagiarized from La Cucaracha, which while being in the public domain and legal, was not original), being extremely uncooperative throughout the task, and for making disloyal remarks by saying even before the task result was announced that he thought the team had lost.
  - Johnny Damon – for being the primary creative force behind the team's unsuccessful jingle, and for not putting up a strong fight against Brandi.
  - Brandi Glanville – for her lack of control over the team, especially Ian Ziering, making very few of the creative decisions, and for refusing to blame the loss on Johnny Damon.
- Notes:
  - Trump moved Leeza Gibbons to Vortex to even out the teams.
  - Celebrity Apprentice 2 winner Joan Rivers appeared as a judge in this task; this would be her final appearance on the show before her death.
  - Leeza Gibbons won $100,000 for her charity.
  - Vortex's victory ended the team's 5-week losing streak.
  - Infinity lost all of its members by the end of this task. This marked only the third time in the show's history (or the fourth, if The Apprentice: Martha Stewart is counted), and the first in a Celebrity Apprentice season, where one team was rendered completely "out of business" after the final regular task of a season.
  - Trump implied that had Brandi Glanville firmly placed the blame for the jingle on Johnny Damon, then she would not have been fired. However, her refusal to do so, and even saying that Johnny deserved to stay in the process at her expense, resulted in her being dismissed as well.
  - Ian's taxi scene was not shown.

=== Episode 7: "Top Feuds, Firings and Fails" ===
- Air Date: February 9, 2015
- U.S. viewers (in millions):
- Summary: In this clip show, Trump recounts some of the most memorable moments from the seven Celebrity Apprentice seasons.
- Top Feuds:
  - 5. Geraldo Rivera vs. Kevin Jonas (Celebrity Apprentice 7)
  - 4. NeNe Leakes vs. Star Jones (Celebrity Apprentice 4)
  - 3. La Toya Jackson vs. Omarosa (All-Star Celebrity Apprentice)
  - 2. Meat Loaf vs. Gary Busey (Celebrity Apprentice 4)
  - 1. Piers Morgan vs. Omarosa (Celebrity Apprentice 1 and All-Star Celebrity Apprentice)
- Top Fails:
  - 4. Kenya Moore's "Babies luv Buns" poster (Celebrity Apprentice 7)
  - 3. Dennis Rodman and Trace Adkins misspelling Melania Trump's name as "Milania" (All-Star Celebrity Apprentice)
  - 2. Clint Black's sleazy detergent commercial (Celebrity Apprentice 2)
  - 1. Gary Busey's robot dog commercial (All-Star Celebrity Apprentice)
- Top Fundraisers:
  - 4. Ian Ziering and Geraldo Rivera (Celebrity Apprentice 7 Task 5; $300,000 raised apiece)
  - 3. Paul Teutul, Sr. (Celebrity Apprentice 5 Task 1; $494,082 raised)
  - 2. Trace Adkins (All-Star Celebrity Apprentice Task 1; $670,072 raised)
  - 1. Marlee Matlin and John Rich (Celebrity Apprentice 4 Task 5; $1,000,000 and $626,000 raised respectively)
- Boardroom Backstabs & Betrayals:
  - 5. Joan Rivers's attack on Annie Duke and poker players in general (Celebrity Apprentice 2)
  - 4. Vincent Pastore's anger at Piers Morgan using him to spy on the women's team (Celebrity Apprentice 1)
  - 3. The showdown between Richard Hatch, and David Cassidy and Jose Canseco (Celebrity Apprentice 4)
  - 2. Kenya Moore's apparent theft of Vivica A. Fox's cellphone (Celebrity Apprentice 7)
  - 1. Omarosa insulting the children of Piers Morgan (Celebrity Apprentice 1)
- Most Memorable Firings:
  - 5. Kevin Jonas, for trying to manipulate Trump into firing Geraldo Rivera (Celebrity Apprentice 7)
  - 4. Gene Simmons, deliberately getting himself fired because he disagreed with his team's loss (Celebrity Apprentice 1)
  - 3. Dennis Rodman, being fired and told to get help for his alcoholism (Celebrity Apprentice 2)
  - 2. Ian Ziering, after being caught lying about his jingle (Celebrity Apprentice 7)
  - 1. Melissa Rivers's firing and subsequent foul-mouthed meltdown at Annie Duke, Brande Roderick and the show's production staff (Celebrity Apprentice 2)
- The episode concluded with a brief look at the show's six winners to date. While they were not specifically ranked, Trump stated his opinion that Joan Rivers was the strongest winner and strongest candidate in any Celebrity Apprentice season.

=== Episode 8: "Universal Wizards" ===
- Air Date: February 9, 2015
- U.S. viewers (in millions):
- Prologue: Following the total dismissal of Infinity in the previous task's boardroom, Trump summoned the three Vortex members and told them that only two would progress to the final, while the weakest of the three would be fired.
  - Fired: Vivica A. Fox, for openly admitting that she was the weakest of the final three candidates, and that both Geraldo Rivera and Leeza Gibbons more deserved to be in the final than she did. Trump was a little disappointed that she didn't fight to stay in the competition, but respected her honesty.
  - Finalists: Leeza Gibbons and Geraldo Rivera
- Final Task Scope: To produce a commercial for the Universal Studios Orlando resort, and sell ten holiday packages for charity.
  - Geraldo's Team: Vivica A. Fox, Lorenzo Lamas, Ian Ziering
  - Leeza's Team: Johnny Damon, Brandi Glanville, Kevin Jonas
- Task Tension: On Leeza's team, Johnny Damon and Brandi Glanville seemed more concerned with having fun in the park than actually helping out in the task, resulting in them coming back from a trip to buy props and costumes nearly empty-handed, much to the annoyance of Leeza and Kevin Jonas, the latter of whom also felt that much of the project was falling on his shoulders. Despite this, the team had secured $170,000 in pledges even at a relatively early stage of the task. Geraldo meanwhile was determined to star in his own advert and refused to listen to the ideas of his team (though did adjust the idea after meeting with the Universal executives), and had nothing pledged to his team aside from a $25,000 donation from one of Lorenzo Lamas's donors. Geraldo also assigned Lorenzo to direct the team's advert, but insisted on setting up the important shots himself before Lorenzo even arrived at the location, and then angrily threatened to fire Lorenzo once it turned out that the child actors had mistakenly been sent to the other side of the park.
- Notes:
  - As with the previous season, no interview round took place, with Trump deciding on the finalists in the final boardroom.
  - Before firing Vivica A. Fox, Trump asked her opinion on who was the stronger of Leeza Gibbons or Geraldo Rivera. Vivica said that she considered them to be evenly matched, with Leeza being a better leader and more creative, but Geraldo being tougher and having more fundraising abilities.
  - Geraldo Rivera and Ian Ziering agreed to put their feud behind them, with Ian saying that his previous behavior toward Geraldo was mostly due to seeing him as the biggest threat in the competition.

=== Episode 9: "Live Finale" ===
- Air Date: February 16, 2015
- U.S. viewers (in millions):
- Judges: Donald Trump; Ivanka Trump; Donald Trump Jr.
- Celebrity Apprentice: Leeza Gibbons
  - Reasons for win: Leeza's commercial was felt to be extremely solid, with only minor criticisms being made by the Universal executives, and in terms of fundraising on this task she made almost three times what Geraldo earned. The comments from her fellow competitors were unanimously positive, with not a single criticism being made of her personality.
- Runner-Up: Geraldo Rivera
  - Reasons for loss: The Universal executives disliked that Geraldo only showed the children having fun and not the adults. On top of that, his fundraising performance proved very disappointing for a final task, falling far short of both his previous efforts this season, and the other candidates weren't nearly as complimentary of Geraldo as they were Leeza.
- Notes:
  - Shawn Johnson and Sig Hansen were not present at the live reunion show. Hansen was in the Bering Sea fishing and filming Deadliest Catch, because the finale aired during the winter snow crab season. Johnson was stuck in Nashville, Tennessee due to bad flying conditions.
  - Trump again asked Kenya Moore if she had stolen Vivica A. Fox's phone, which she still denied having done.
  - During his presentation Geraldo Rivera earned the ire of his team by twice mispronouncing Ian Ziering's name, and also getting the name of Lorenzo Lamas's former TV show Renegade wrong.
  - Former contestant Melissa Rivers made an appearance as part of a special tribute to her late mother, Joan Rivers. When Trump was polling the celebrities, Vivica A. Fox suggested that since Joan was the only female Celebrity Apprentice winner so far, her memory should be honored by crowning Leeza Gibbons as the second female winner, something that the studio audience appeared to overwhelmingly agree with. Ironically, Leeza became the second winner after Joan to earn less money than the runner-up, albeit just $12,000 less than Geraldo Rivera, compared to Joan earning almost $200,000 less than Annie Duke did.

== Reception ==
=== U.S. Nielsen ratings ===
Order	Episode Title	Airdate	Time slot (EST)	Rating/Share (18–49)	Viewers (millions)	Rank (Timeslot)	Rank (Night)
1	"May The Gods of Good Pies Be with Us!"	January 4, 2015	Sunday; 9:00 pm	2.4/7	6.31	2	5
2	"Nobody Out Thinks Donald Trump"	January 5, 2015	Monday; 8:00 pm	2.0/6	6.49	4	7
3	"A Family Affair"	January 12, 2015	Monday; 8:00 pm	1.7/5	5.85	3	4
4	"I Wish I Had A Project Manager"	January 19, 2015	Monday; 8:00 pm	1.9/5	6.51	4	6
5	"It's Like A Booze Cruise Of Knowledge"	January 26, 2015	Monday; 8:00 pm	1.8/5	6.32	4	4
6	"Who Stole My Phone?"	February 2, 2015	Monday; 8:00 pm	2.1/6	6.98	3	4
7	"Top Feuds, Firings and Fails"	February 9, 2015	Monday; 8:00 pm	1.2/4	4.61	4	9
8	"Universal Wizards"	February 9, 2015	Monday; 9:00 pm	1.4/4	4.98	2	8
9	"Live Finale"	February 16, 2015	Monday; 8:00 pm	1.7/5	6.10	4	5
