= The Apprentice (American TV series) season 7 =

The Apprentice
- Season 7
- No. of contestants: 14
- Winner: Piers Morgan
- Runner-up: Trace Adkins
- No. of episodes: 13

Release
- Original network: NBC
- Original release: January 3 – March 27, 2008

Additional information
- Filming dates: October 2007 – November 2007

Season chronology
- ← Previous; Season 6 Next → Season 8

The Celebrity Apprentice (also known as The Apprentice 7) is the seventh installment of the reality game show The Apprentice, and the first of The Celebrity Apprentice. This season features celebrity candidates vying for the title of Donald Trump's, "Best Business Brain," as a way to revitalize the series, with the winner donating their proceeds to charity. This installment marked the series' return to New York after spending the previous season in Los Angeles and features abstract paintings by Seattle-based artist Maeve Harris. The series premiered on NBC on January 3, 2008, at 9:00 pm.

This is the first season where the candidates did not reside in a communal penthouse of Trump Tower which was more as a meeting vicinity and also the boardroom. The celebrities lived in Trump International Hotel and Tower. There are also no traditionally given rewards to the winning team apart from the winning project manager receiving an amount of $20,000 along with available proceeds from the tasks to be donated to the winning manager's favorite charity. Nevertheless, the firing rule remained. America's Got Talent judge Piers Morgan was the winner, beating country music singer Trace Adkins in the finals. Morgan was the only celebrity fired during the original British celebrity edition of the show.

== Candidates ==
The following is the list of candidates for this season, with their original team placements. The show went back to its original concept of men versus women. The all-women team named their team Empresario (a Spanish term meaning "entrepreneur",) while the all-men team named theirs Hydra (after a monster from ancient Greek mythology.)

Candidate data
Celebrity	Background	Original Team	Age	Hometown	Charity	Result	Raised
Piers Morgan	America's Got Talent judge	Hydra	42	Guildford, Surrey, UK	Intrepid Fallen Heroes Fund	The Celebrity Apprentice (2008–03–27)	$754,300
Trace Adkins	Country singer	Hydra	45	Springhill, Louisiana, U.S.	Food Allergy & Anaphylaxis Network	Fired in the Season Finale (2008–03–27)	$102,000
Carol Alt	Supermodel	Empresario	47	East Williston, New York, U.S.	Tony Alt Memorial Foundation	Fired in week 12 (2008–03–20)	$40,000
Lennox Lewis	Professional boxer	Hydra	42	Kitchener, Ontario, Canada	The Muhammad Ali Center	Fired in week 12 (2008–03–20)	$40,000
Stephen Baldwin	Actor & author	Hydra	41	Massapequa, New York, U.S.	Carol M. Baldwin Breast Cancer Research Fund	Fired in week 11 (2008–03–13)	$89,324
Omarosa	The Apprentice contestant	Empresario	33	Youngstown, Ohio, U.S.	Positive Vibrations Youth Mentoring Program	Fired in week 10 (2008–03–06)	
Tito Ortiz	UFC fighter	Hydra	32	Santa Ana, California, U.S.	St. Jude Children's Research Hospital	Fired in week 9 (2008–02–28)	$70,000
Marilu Henner	Actress & author	Empresario	55	Chicago, Illinois, U.S.	Physicians Committee for Responsible Medicine	Fired in week 8 (2008–02–21)	$20,000^{1}
Nely Galán	Former President of Entertainment for Telemundo	Empresario	44	Teaneck, New Jersey, U.S.	Count Me In	Fired in week 6 (2008–02–07)	
Vincent Pastore	The Sopranos actor	Hydra	61	New Rochelle, New York, U.S.	Lustgarten Foundation for Pancreatic Cancer Research	Quit in week 5 (2008–01–31)	$50,000
Jennie Finch	Olympic softball pitcher	Empresario	27	La Mirada, California, U.S.	International Breast Cancer Research Foundation	Fired in week 4 (2008–01–24)	
Gene Simmons	Kiss singer & entrepreneur	Hydra	58	Los Angeles, California, U.S.	Elizabeth Glaser Pediatric AIDS Foundation	Fired in week 3 (2008–01–17)	$20,000
Nadia Comăneci	Olympic gymnast	Empresario	46	Oneşti, Romania	Special Olympics	Fired in week 2 (2008–01–10)	
Tiffany Fallon	Playboy model	Empresario	33	Fort Lauderdale, Florida, U.S.	Walter Reed Society	Fired in week 1 (2008–01–03)	

^1 In an unaired scene available on the web, Trump gave Marilu Henner's charity a $20,000 donation because he felt she deserved to win money for her charity.

Donald Trump, in an apparent gesture to reconcile his feud with Rosie O'Donnell, offered her a contestant spot on the show but was turned down in a statement by O'Donnell's spokeswoman.

== Weekly results ==
Candidate	Original team	Week 3 team	Week 6 team	Week 7 team	Week 8 team	Final Task Team	Application result	Record as project manager
Piers Morgan	Hydra	Hydra	Hydra	Hydra	Hydra	Hydra	The Celebrity Apprentice	2–1 (win in weeks 7 & 10, loss in week 5)
Trace Adkins	Hydra	Hydra	Hydra	Empresario	Empresario	Empresario	Fired in the Season Finale	0–2 (loss in weeks 7 & 11)
Carol Alt	Empresario	Empresario	Empresario	Hydra	Hydra	Hydra	Fired in week 12	2–0 (win in weeks 5 & 9)
Lennox Lewis	Hydra	Hydra	Hydra	Hydra	Hydra	Empresario	Fired in week 12	2–0 (win in weeks 6 & 11)
Stephen Baldwin	Hydra	Hydra	Empresario	Empresario	Empresario	Hydra	Fired in week 11	2–0 (win in weeks 1 & 8)
Omarosa	Empresario	Empresario	Empresario	Hydra	Empresario		Fired in week 10	0–3 (loss in weeks 1, 6, & 10)
Tito Ortiz	Hydra	Hydra	Hydra	Empresario	Empresario		Fired in week 9	1–1 (win in week 3, loss in week 9)
Marilu Henner	Empresario	Empresario	Empresario	Empresario	Hydra	Empresario	Fired in week 8	0–2 (loss in weeks 4 & 8)
Nely Galán	Empresario	Empresario	Empresario				Fired in week 6	0–1 (loss in week 2)
Vincent Pastore	Hydra	Hydra					Quit in week 5	1–0 (win in week 4)
Jennie Finch	Empresario	Empresario					Fired in week 4	
Gene Simmons	Hydra	Empresario					Fired in week 3	1–1 (win in week 2, loss in week 3)
Nadia Comăneci	Empresario						Fired in week 2	
Tiffany Fallon	Empresario						Fired in week 1	

No.	Elimination chart													
No.	Candidate	1	2	3	4	5	6	7	8	9	10	11	12	13
1	Piers	IN	IN	IN	IN	LOSE	IN	WIN	BR	IN	WIN	IN	IN	CA
2	Trace	IN	IN	IN	IN	IN	IN	LOSE	IN	IN	IN	LOSE	IN	FIRED
3	Carol	BR	BR	IN	BR	WIN	IN	IN	IN	WIN	IN	IN	FIRED	
4	Lennox	IN	IN	IN	IN	IN	WIN	IN	BR	IN	IN	WIN	FIRED	
5	Stephen	WIN	IN	IN	IN	IN	IN	IN	WIN	IN	IN	FIRED		
6	Omarosa	LOSE	IN	BR	IN	IN	LOSE	IN	IN	IN	FIRED			
7	Tito	IN	IN	WIN	IN	IN	IN	IN	IN	FIRED				
8	Marilu	IN	IN	IN	LOSE	IN	BR	IN	FIRED					
9	Nely	IN	LOSE	IN	IN	IN	FIRED							
10	Vincent	IN	IN	IN	WIN	QUIT								
11	Jennie	IN	IN	BR	FIRED									
12	Gene	IN	WIN	FIRED										
13	Nadia	IN	FIRED											
14	Tiffany	FIRED												

The candidate was on the losing team.
The candidate won the competition and was named The Celebrity Apprentice.
The candidate won as project manager on his/her team.
The candidate lost as project manager on his/her team.
The candidate was on the losing team and brought to the final boardroom.
The candidate was fired.
The candidate lost as project manager and was fired.
The candidate quit the competition.
The candidate was absent during the week due to previous engagements.

== Episodes ==
=== Episode 1: Selling Hot Dogs ===
- Airdate: January 3, 2008
- Task scope: Each team had to sell hot dogs on the streets of New York City for as much money as possible.
- Hydra project manager: Stephen Baldwin
- Empresario project manager: Omarosa
- Judges: Donald Trump; Ivanka Trump; Donald Trump Jr.
- Winning team: Hydra, with total sales of $52,286.
  - Reasons for win: Hydra used Radio City as their location and used their celebrity status to drastically up-sell the hot dogs and Gene Simmons used his contacts to put up impressive numbers. Piers Morgan also came up with an idea whereby anyone who paid $100 or more for a hot dog would get to have their picture taken with one of the celebrities, encouraging passers-by to make more substantial donations.
- Losing team: Empresario, with total sales of $17,038.79.
  - Reasons for loss: Empresario did not use their celebrity status to the extent they could have and chose sound business principles instead. Many hot dogs were sold for much lower prices than Hydra had, and their location (which was near Penn Station) was deemed awful by the Trumps, mainly due to the numerous food courts at the station.
  - Sent to boardroom: Omarosa, Tiffany Fallon, and Carol Alt
- Fired: Tiffany Fallon – for being the least effective saleswoman on her team, playing the game low-key, and for holding out on her contacts. While Omarosa led the team to failure after she forbid her teammates to use their celebrity status and Carol Alt was responsible for picking their bad location, Trump was nonetheless impressed with their hard work, and he did not like that Tiffany (a Playboy Playmate) did not call Hugh Hefner to help with the task. Tiffany stated that she was waiting for a more opportune event to use his services, but Trump ultimately fired her for it.
- Notes:
  - This is the first time the winning team as a whole watched the losing team in the boardroom. Prior to this season, only the project manager was allowed to do this.
  - This is the first season where the firing process started immediately after the results are revealed. Usually the winning team would be given a reward for their victory prior to the start of the boardroom, but the rewards were dropped from the show at the start of this season.
  - Tito Ortiz brought his girlfriend Jenna Jameson to help with their task.
  - Gene Simmons called in many of his contacts to donate money, including fellow Kiss member Paul Stanley.
  - Despite Omarosa's original approach of not using the celebrity status on the task, Marilu Henner called in some of her contacts, who brought in a total of $11,000 for her team's total profit.
  - Jennie Finch brought in New York Mets 3rd baseman David Wright near the end of the task, and he purchased their remaining stock for an unspecified, but significant amount.
  - In the boardroom it was noted that if not for Marilu and Jennie's efforts, Empresario would have only raised a few thousand dollars.
  - This episode marked the beginning of the feud between Omarosa and Piers Morgan, when Omarosa took offense to Piers mispronouncing her name and his claim to have no idea who she was. Omarosa responded by claiming she wasn't familiar with his show, America's Got Talent, but Piers fired back by saying that it was the country's most-watched show at the time.
  - $69,324 is the amount that both teams together raised, which is the amount that Stephen Baldwin received for his charity.

=== Episode 2: Pedigree Community Awareness Ad ===
- Airdate: January 10, 2008
- Task sponsor: Pedigree
- Task scope: Each team must create a heart-warming commercial advertising for both Pedigree dog food and the Pedigree Adoption Drive.
- Hydra project manager: Gene Simmons
- Empresario project manager: Nely Galán
- Judges: Donald Trump; Ivanka Trump; Terry Lundgren
- Winning team: Hydra
  - Reasons for win: Once again, Hydra utilized their celebrity status to improve the quality of the commercial, using Trace Adkins' deep voice for the voice-over and having Lennox Lewis star in the commercial, which made it a success.
- Losing team: Empresario
  - Reasons for loss: The client felt Nely got carried away during their presentation for their advertisement, and Empresario did not utilize as much celebrity power to sell their commercial. Although they used Marilu Henner as a voice-over, it was not distinctive enough to empower their commercial and the other voice-overs that had been used were deemed undesirable for broadcasting.
  - Sent to boardroom: Nely Galán, Carol Alt, and Nadia Comăneci
- Fired: Nadia Comăneci – for lacking a competitive drive and over concerns that she would be an effective leader. While Nely Galán admitted that she was too ambitious regarding the project and took full responsibility for the loss, Trump still believed that she was an exceptional teammate. Trump also felt that Nadia did not defend herself well enough against Carol and Nely, which added to his belief that Nadia could not lead the team.
- Notes:
  - Carol Baldwin and her sister came to Trump Tower to receive the money Stephen Baldwin earned last episode
  - Members of Hydra became restless while Gene Simmons and Stephen Baldwin did all the editing for the commercial by themselves.
  - Nely Galán chose to meet with the clients who were to judge this commercial in order to get a more effective message while Gene Simmons did not, believing that time was of the essence. Trump has commented in previous seasons that you should always talk to the clients so you really understand what you are looking for, but in an ironic twist, Hydra was the team that won the task.
  - Hydra's commercial was shown at the Westminster Kennel Club Dog Show.
  - Gene Simmons insulted Ivanka by brushing off her requests for a status report and asked her if she would tell Empresario what the men were doing, accusing her of female solidarity in the process. Gene subsequently apologized to Ivanka in the boardroom.
  - Gene Simmons won $20,000 for his charity in this task

=== Episode 3: Mr. Outside the Box ===
- Airdate: January 17, 2008
- Task sponsor: Kodak
- Task scope: Each team must highlight Kodak as an ink producer with significant cost reduction to consumers. Each team was provided with an empty Airstream trailer to use as part of their sidewalk promotion.
- Corporate Reshuffle: Since the women are down to 5 members against 7 on Hydra, Mr. Trump placed Gene Simmons on Empresario to even out the teams, and perhaps help the team win a task. He subsequently introduced himself as the "benevolent dictator" to Omarosa's confusion and the Hydra's amusement.
- Hydra project manager: Tito Ortiz
- Empresario project manager: Gene Simmons
- Judges: Donald Trump, Ivanka Trump, Jim Cramer
- Winning team: Hydra
  - Reasons for win: While their presentation was not as refined as Empresario, Hydra was on target with the message Kodak wanted to promote: the reduction of ink costs with their printers. In addition, Hydra raised more revenue than Empresario.
- Losing team: Empresario
  - Reasons for loss: Even though the judges felt that they had a better presentation, Empresario did not use the appropriate message, focusing more on the functions of the printer and not so much the ink. Trump considered this to be mainly the fault of Nely Galán, who failed to relay the necessary information to the rest of the team after she talked over the Kodak executives and paid little attention to what they were saying.
  - Sent to boardroom: Gene Simmons, Jennie Finch, and Omarosa
- Fired: Gene Simmons – by default, as the other two candidates he selected for the boardroom were not responsible for their team's failure. While Trump felt that Nely Galán was at fault for the loss, Gene believed his approach to the task was correct and the executives from Kodak failed to see it. Even when strongly advised by Trump to bring back Nely, Gene refused to do so, and his independence and steadfastness to his beliefs ultimately got him fired.
- Notes:
  - Nely Galán surprisingly thought that Trump should fire Jennie Finch.
  - Gene Simmons moved to Empresario and became project manager at the invitation of Trump at the start of the task. This marks the first time that in two consecutive tasks a contestant was a project manager in separate teams (Hydra in Week 2, Empresario in Week 3).
  - A combination of Stephen Baldwin, Lennox Lewis, and Tito Ortiz tipped a conference table at the end of a photo shoot. This resulted in a coffee spill which damaged the designer's laptop.
  - Alec Baldwin was brought in by his brother Stephen to help Hydra and bought several printers. Coincidentally, Alec Baldwin would play Donald Trump on Saturday Night Live.
  - Jim Cramer hated the sloppiness of Hydra's presentation, saying that it felt like a place to throw garbage away and not a place to learn about Kodak ink.
  - Gene Simmons originally wanted to bring in Omarosa only. Trump felt that bringing her only was sabotaging his chances to stay in the show, as he implied that Nely Galán should be brought in. He allowed Gene to invite one more person to bring back and he decided to bring back Jennie Finch.
  - Trump advised Gene that the Kodak executives did not like Nely's approach at their meeting, and felt that Empresario's message was not the right one; however, Gene insisted that Nely should not be fired, and that the executives were wrong in their message.
  - Despite saying that Gene should be fired for being in overall charge of Empresario's campaign and failing to bring back Nely, Omarosa strongly criticized Jennie Finch's overall performance in the show, saying that she was probably the weakest member of the team and had contributed little throughout the previous weeks. Trump agreed with her, and told Jennie to step up on the next task.
  - Tito Ortiz won $20,000 for his charity.

=== Episode 4: A Knight on Broadway ===
- Airdate: January 24, 2008
- Task sponsor: Nederlander Producing Company of America
- Task scope: Each team must sell tickets to Broadway shows. The team that raises the most money wins.
- Hydra project manager: Vincent Pastore
- Empresario project manager: Marilu Henner
- Judges: Donald Trump, Ivanka Trump, Vince McMahon
- Winning team: Hydra
  - Reasons for win: The men secured a last-minute donation for $10,000 from Richard Branson thanks to Piers Morgan, putting them just above the women in the final total.
- Losing team: Empresario
  - Reasons for loss: Both teams worked exceptionally well throughout the task, but the women lost narrowly by $2,000. It was also discussed that Nely Galán had arranged a donation that came too late to be counted toward their total.
  - Sent to boardroom: Marilu Henner, Carol Alt, and Jennie Finch
- Fired: Jennie Finch – for her minimal contributions throughout the process and her discomfort while working in a cut-throat business environment like The Apprentice.
- Notes:
  - Marilu Henner had help from David Hyde Pierce from the Broadway show Curtains. Bob Saget also came into Hydra's area to buy tickets.
  - Vincent Pastore praised Piers Morgan for bringing in the big bucks and willing to get his hands dirty. He also called him the MVP of Hydra.
  - Marilu Henner chose Jennie Finch and Carol Alt as she felt they were the weakest players on the team.
  - Members of Empresario started to become concerned with the effect Omarosa was having on the team, with Carol Alt verbally denouncing her while Empresario was in the boardroom.
  - Ivanka Trump stated that Marilu Henner was their only shot at victory because she came up with the big ideas.
  - Vincent Pastore won $50,000 for his charity on this task.
  - This is Empresario's fourth loss in a row, as well as Hydra's fourth win in a row. The last time on The Apprentice that a team lost four in a row at the beginning was in season 1, with Versacorp losing four in a row to Protege.

=== Episode 5: The Croc and the Rat ===
- Air date: January 31, 2008
- Task sponsor: Crocs
- Task scope: Each team had to come up with a marketing campaign dealing with donating shoes to children in third world countries.
- Hydra project manager: Piers Morgan
- Empresario project manager: Carol Alt
- Judges: Donald Trump; Ivanka Trump; Donald Trump Jr.
- Winning team: Empresario
  - Reasons for win: Despite the judges' concern about the cost of their campaign, they created a more effective and creative marketing approach.
- Losing team: Hydra
  - Reasons for loss: While the men were acclaimed for using Trace Adkins' slogan ("Wear Them, Share Them"), they only prepared a donation bin without any additional supporting materials and were criticized for not having the "complete campaign package". Their marketing plan was also viewed as not being as creative as the other team's design and Trump felt that the men were overusing Lennox Lewis in their tasks and that his novelty was wearing off.
  - Sent to boardroom: No final boardroom – while all the men but Lennox Lewis wanted Piers Morgan fired, Vincent Pastore told Trump that he did not wish to continue in the process and tendered his resignation.
- Resigned: Vincent Pastore – due to his resentment of working in such a cut-throat work environment. He did say that he would have stayed if Piers Morgan was fired.
- Notes:
  - Tito Ortiz was absent from this entire task because he was attending a fight. He was not penalized and returned for the following task. This is the first time that an active candidate was not present for the revealed results, though not the first time that a candidate was given a bye from the task.
  - Vincent Pastore and his ex-wife, Nancy Berke, ate at a café and he surprised her with the check he won in the last episode.
  - After a false accusation that the girls were spying on the men, Piers Morgan assigned Vincent Pastore to spy on Empresario, causing strife among both teams. This episode also intensified the conflict between Omarosa and Piers that had begun in the first boardroom of the season. Even Nely Galán was disgusted by Piers' actions and hoped that he would be fired.
  - Stephen Baldwin denounced the sabotage to Hydra, yet he still went with Morgan to joke around about Empresario. As a result, Morgan called him a hypocrite.
  - In the final boardroom, a lengthy discussion took place on who should leave. Stephen Baldwin said that Piers Morgan should leave because of his dishonesty; Trace Adkins said that Piers should leave because he had delivered the team's first failure as a project manager, while Lennox Lewis said that Vincent Pastore should leave as he had been a less effective contributor than Piers overall. In the end, Vincent insisted on his termination, adding that the show's atmosphere would likely aggravate his existing health problems.
  - References were made to The Godfather with Donald Trump being compared to Vito Corleone and Vincent Pastore being compared to Luca Brasi. The final scenes of the episode were a parody of the series finale of The Sopranos. The final scenes are replaced with an alternate ending on the Amazon Prime airing of the show.
  - Carol Alt was the first and only woman this season to win as project manager.
  - It was the first two-hour episode of the season.
  - Carol Alt received $20,000 for her charity. In addition, since she was project manager for this task, 10,000 pairs of shoes went to Third World Countries in her name.

=== Episode 6: Window of Opportunity ===
- Airdate: February 7, 2008
- Task sponsor: Vera Wang by Serta
- Task scope: Each team is to create a living window, using actors and actresses in a shop window to promote Vera Wang's new mattress line by Serta.
- Hydra project manager: Lennox Lewis
- Empresario project manager: Omarosa
- Judges: Donald Trump; George Ross; Donald Trump Jr.
- Winning team: Hydra
  - Reasons for win: Hydra learned that the Serta executives wanted to move away from an existing "bridal" image and used this information to help think outside the box, thus fashioning a more creative and original window than Empresario.
- Losing team: Empresario
  - Reasons for loss: Despite asking similar questions as Hydra did, Empresario did not pick up on what the executives really wanted. They created a decent display but it was nowhere near as creative as Hydra's was.
  - Sent to boardroom: Omarosa, Marilu Henner, and Nely Galán
- Fired: Nely Galán – for not helping Omarosa coming up with a better concept, along with her less than stellar performances in past projects.
- Notes:
  - Stephen Baldwin refused to work with Piers Morgan after being called a hypocrite by Piers in the previous episode's boardroom. He also threatened to quit the show, but Trump recommended that Stephen be transferred over to Empresario instead. Stephen then became a member of the women's team, losing the respect of his competitors in the process.
  - Omarosa spoke for the women and respectfully declined Stephen's invitation to the team, but Trump let him transfer regardless. She also planned on bringing Stephen back to the final boardroom after he missed the first day of the task due to a commitment with his church, but Trump told her that it was not a good idea.
  - When Trump brought up Nely Galán's past performances that led Empresario to failure, she flippantly asked him why he hadn't moved past it. This would later be a supplemental point in her termination.
  - Lennox Lewis won $20,000 for his charity.

=== Episode 7: The Mane Event ===
- Airdate: February 14, 2008
- Task scope: Each team is to make the most money using horse carriages located in Central Park.
- Hydra project manager: Piers Morgan
- Empresario project manager: Trace Adkins
- Judges: Donald Trump, Ivanka Trump, George Ross
- Winning team: Hydra
  - Reasons for win: Despite the contentious bickering between Piers Morgan and Omarosa throughout the entire task, along with Omarosa not bringing in any donations yet again, many of the team's contacts came last minute and helped propel Hydra to their win.
- Losing team: Empresario
  - Reasons for loss: There seemed to be no specific reason that Empresario lost other than just not raising enough money. Contrary to their opponents, the team worked in terrific harmony and kept the carriages moving all day, making their loss a baffling one.
  - Sent to boardroom: No final boardroom needed. Trump did not feel anyone on the team did anything that warranted a termination, so he chose to fire no one for the first time in the show's history.
  - Fired: No firing – due to the team's unity and hard work.
- Notes:
  - This was the first time in the history of The Apprentice that no one exited the show.
  - At the beginning of this episode, the new Hydra consisted of Carol Alt, Lennox Lewis, Omarosa, and Piers Morgan. The new Empresario consisted of Marilu Henner, Stephen Baldwin, Tito Ortiz, and Trace Adkins.
  - This is the first time where Trump himself picked the newly reshuffled teams (candidates were able to choose their own teams in previous seasons).
  - Once again, Tito Ortiz enlisted in the help of his girlfriend, Jenna Jameson. Stephen Baldwin also enlisted the help of another Baldwin brother, Billy Baldwin, to help with the carriages.
  - Trace Adkins received a surprise when John Rich of Big & Rich assisted with Empresario. Adkins would later return the favor when Rich appeared as one of the candidates in the fourth Celebrity edition.
  - After leaving the boardroom, Piers told Omarosa he did not want any fighting or hostility during the task which they shook hands on. On the day of the task however, they got in an argument on the way to the van over Omarosa not spelling Piers' name right, with Piers saying Trump would be extremely unhappy if one of his employees spelled his name wrong. Piers Morgan then fired Omarosa within the first five minutes. She refused to leave, however, and their feud continued. The tension increased dramatically when Omarosa made repeated allegations and references about Piers' former marriage and his children. This hostility resulted in Piers telling Trump that he will never work with Omarosa again and Trump will have to separate the two or fire him. Trump chose to separate them and declared that Omarosa returns to Empresario, while Marilu Henner moves to Hydra.
  - In Empresario's boardroom session, Trump lamented that he had to fire someone from an essentially perfect team and strongly hinted that Omarosa would have been fired had Hydra lost the task.
  - Piers Morgan won $65,000 for his charity.

=== Episode 8: Quality, Value, and Chaos ===
- Airdate: February 21, 2008
- Task sponsor: QVC
- Task scope: Each team is to promote their selected products on QVC live on television.
- Hydra project manager: Marilu Henner
- Empresario project manager: Stephen Baldwin
- Judges: Donald Trump; Ivanka Trump; Donald Trump Jr.
- Winning team: Empresario
  - Reasons for win: Trace Adkins (who was selected as the speaker for Empresario's product) spoke clearly and calmly while promoting their vacuum, which positively contrasted from his opponent (Marilu Henner) who had a hyperactive presentation of her product. Trump also liked the fact that Trace used nuts and bolts to promote its strength and utility. Additionally, they offered an alternative payment plan called "Easy Pay", which Hydra did not. Empresario raised $43,000 to Hydra's $35,145.
- Losing team: Hydra
  - Reasons for loss: Hydra had a lower price point and sold fewer units than Empresario. While Carol Alt and Marilu Henner had both done multiple stints on QVC in the past, both of them were completely unaware that QVC offered an alternative payment plan, which could have promoted sales. Also, Trump believed Marilu Henner was too garrulous during the advertising of her product.
  - Sent to boardroom: Marilu Henner, Lennox Lewis, and Piers Morgan
  - Fired: Marilu Henner – for being too overzealous while selling Hydra's products and for not bringing back Carol Alt into the boardroom, who had been deemed more accountable for the loss over Lennox Lewis and Piers Morgan.
- Notes:
  - As the victorious project manager, Stephen Baldwin won an additional $20,000 for his charity. So far, he raised a total of $89,324 for his charity.*
  - Piers Morgan called Lennox Lewis a "sleepy boy" in the boardroom, and Trump took it as an insult to Lennox.
  - Despite their extensive history of working with QVC, both Carol Alt and Marilu Henner claimed to have never known about the "Easy Pay" installment plan for viewers that couldn't afford to pay for a product at full price. Subsequently, Marilu's decision to not bring Carol back for this oversight was surprising to her teammates and Trump's advisors.
  - Originally, both teams wanted to use the ladder kart for their segment. A coin toss determined that Hydra would take the ladder kart, so Empresario took the sweeper.
  - This marks the only time that Hydra had someone fired from their team all season.
  - This was the last time Empresario won a task and the last time Hydra lost a task.

=== Episode 9: The Money Shot ===
- Airdate: February 28, 2008
- Task sponsor: Dial Corporation and Redbook
- Task scope: Each team is to design a 4-page photo essay to promote Dial Corporation's Dial Yogurt on Redbook.
- Hydra project manager: Carol Alt
- Empresario project manager: Tito Ortiz
- Judges: Donald Trump, Ivanka Trump, George Ross
- Winning team: Hydra
  - Reasons for win: Their message of incorporating both the Redbook target audience and the Dial brand worked very well, and their use of Carol Alt as the model also appealed for the target demographics of Redbook readers. Although the executives thought the picture on the last page was too risque, ultimately Hydra was superior.
- Losing team: Empresario
  - Reasons for loss: The theme and text for Empresario's campaign was not consistent enough for the executives and they didn't take the necessary risks by adding more provocative images of Trace Adkins. Tito Ortiz also gave a very shaky presentation, which did not help with impressing the executives of Dial and Redbook.
  - Sent to boardroom: No final boardroom – Trump had announced that the losing project manager would be fired by default this week, and Tito Ortiz was unable to say anything to change Trump's mind. In fact, Tito actually made Trump even more inclined to fire him by indicating that he would have brought back Trace Adkins instead of Omarosa, despite Trace having been praised by the executives and Omarosa backing out of the project manager's role in the task briefing.
  - Fired: Tito Ortiz – for not being a successful project manager, giving a bad presentation, deferring too much to Stephen Baldwin during his decision-making process and for saying he would've saved Omarosa if he had to choose one person to not come back into the final boardroom.
- Notes:
  - Carol Alt admitted that it was a good choice for her to be project manager, as she has been on the cover of Redbook five times.
  - When the celebrities met with Trump before the task began, Omarosa initially wanted to become the project manager and signaled this to her teammates. Almost immediately after, Trump then declared he would most likely going to fire a project manager of the losing team. Omarosa, who then hesitated and changed her mind, pressured Tito Ortiz into being project manager instead.
  - With seven candidates remaining, Carol Alt and Omarosa were the only two women. This is the fewest women in the final seven in a single season.
  - Omarosa wanted the pictures of Trace Adkins and the two models with their shirts off. However, Stephen Baldwin thought it was too risky for Redbook and convinced Tito Ortiz to take a conservative approach.
  - Even though Trump never gave Tito Ortiz the opportunity to do so, Trump asked him if one person had to be saved, who would it be. Tito said that he would have sent Omarosa back to the suite. Trump questioned this decision, pointing out that she had contributed the least to the task and had backed out of being project manager, but Tito said that her idea of a more provocative advert was the correct one, and that he should have listened to her.
  - Even though he was fired, Tito Ortiz went away with an additional $50,000 for his charity from Trump, along with the money he received being project manager in episode three. For his charity, Tito raised a total of $70,000.
  - Carol Alt received another $20,000 for being the successful project manager.

=== Episode 10: Painting by Numbers ===
- Airdate: March 6, 2008
- Task sponsor: Artaissance
- Task scope: Choose an artist, set up an exhibit, sell their works of art, and earn the most profit.
- Hydra project manager: Piers Morgan
- Empresario project manager: Omarosa
- Judges: Donald Trump; Ivanka Trump; Donald Trump Jr.
- Winning team: Hydra
  - Reasons for win: Hydra picked an artist that had a much bigger inventory with a higher price point and had sold 14 out of 20 paintings, earning $164,000 and blowing Empresario out of the water. In addition, Piers Morgan got several wealthy donors to come and support him.
- Losing team: Empresario
  - Reasons for loss: Empresario had far less volume and sold only 3 out of 16 paintings, which resulted in a sales total of just $7,000. Additionally, their prices from their artist were far too low and would've only earned $40,000 had they sold out. Stephen Baldwin also did not make a single sale, despite bringing in some of his close contacts.
  - Sent to boardroom: No final boardroom – Given the magnitude of the loss and this being her third failure as a project manager, there was no argument Omarosa could make that she should continue in the process. While Trump was upset that Stephen did not bring any money whatsoever, he ultimately chose to eliminate Omarosa only.
  - Fired: Omarosa Manigault – for being Project Manager/Team Leader in the worst defeat in the history of the show and having a horrendous record of three failures as Project Manager/Team Leader.
- Notes:
  - Trump referred to this as the biggest slaughter in the history of the show, due to a catastrophic loss of $157,000 on Empresario's behalf. Empresario's loss broke the record for the worst loss in the history of the show. This record was formerly held by season four's team of Excel.
  - For the announcement of the task, Trump invited the remaining candidates to go to Trump Tower to meet his wife Melania and son Barron.
  - Omarosa acknowledged that she had been fired in a task on her original season that also involved an art exhibit, but stepped up to be the project manager regardless.
  - Piers Morgan suggested that Trump fire two members from Empresario (specifically Omarosa and Stephen Baldwin) due to the sheer scale of the defeat.
  - When called a closeted homosexual by Omarosa, Piers was invited back into the boardroom by Trump to defend himself. He went back and gave Trace Adkins a kiss on the cheek. Trump thought this was a clever and amusing way to discredit Omarosa's point.
  - Carol Alt was able to steal one of Stephen Baldwin's contacts, after he was unaware of the dynamic in which the galleries worked. She had him buy a painting from her gallery, which went into Piers' team and not Stephen's. Carol also claimed to have almost stole one of Omarosa's contacts.
  - Piers Morgan won $51,300 in this task. His charity money raised-to-date to $116,300 after this victory.
  - Omarosa became the first candidate ever to be fired twice on The Apprentice. She also became the second person to lose as task as project manager three times, the first being Troy McClain from the first season.

=== Episode 11: Bread and Badda-bing ===
- Airdate: March 13, 2008
- Task sponsor: Quiznos Sub
- Task scope: Each team is to create a new sandwich for Quiznos and sell it over a two-hour period – without the benefit of their Rolodexes.
- Hydra project manager: Lennox Lewis
- Empresario project manager: Trace Adkins
- Judges: Donald Trump, Ivanka Trump, Daryl Roth
- Winning team: Hydra
  - Reasons for win: While their sandwich appeared less innovative (it was just an adaption of Quiznos' most popular sandwich), their use of Lennox Lewis as their main marketing tool helped sell their sandwich very well.
- Losing team: Empresario
  - Reasons for loss: Even though Empresario sold out and was more original, their marketing tool to sell Trace Adkins did not work because he was not well known in the New York area.
  - Sent to boardroom: Trace Adkins and Stephen Baldwin.
  - Fired: Stephen Baldwin – for being considered a weaker candidate over Trace Adkins. While both members did equally well and Stephen had two successes as a project manager, Trump and Ivanka discussed that Stephen's contributions over the last few tasks had not produced much for charity and felt that Trace Adkins would do better overall.
- Notes:
  - Hydra sold 313 "Champ Sandwiches" while Emprasario sold 253 "Cowboy Clubs".
  - At the end of the episode Trump stated that by the end of the night two more celebrities would be fired, leaving only two of the final four (Trace Adkins, Carol Alt, Lennox Lewis, and Piers Morgan).
  - After 11 episodes, Empresario only won two tasks, which gives this corporation the weakest corporate record among all seasons. Likewise, Hydra only lost two tasks, which gives this corporation the strongest corporate record among all seasons.
  - Trump stated during the boardroom meeting that he hated the name "Empresario."Stephen compared Empresario to a "sinking ship," while Trace said that the team was like a disease. Likewise earlier in the season, several of the women showed disdain for the name Hydra.
  - This is the first time that two people in a final four were raised from somewhere other than the United States. Both Lennox Lewis and Piers Morgan live in the United Kingdom.
  - Lennox Lewis won another $20,000 for his charity, totalling $40,000 for charity for his two project manager wins.
  - Trace and Stephen had predicted that Hydra would use a "knockout sandwich" idea. The very next scene showed Piers saying "the sandwich is a knockout".

=== Episode 12: Going Once, Twice, You're Fired ===
- Airdate: March 20, 2008
- Prologue: Trump first introduced the four remaining candidates to two people he has known a long time, Jim Cramer and Erin Burnett. Trump then revealed the next challenge to the contestants: they would each have an interview with Jim and with Erin, and through answering Jim and Erin's questions, they were to demonstrate why, out of the final four, they alone deserved to be crowned as 'The Celebrity Apprentice'. Trump said that he respects the opinion of Jim and Erin, and that based upon their feedback (Jim and Erin served as the judges for this task), he would immediately fire two people.
- Fired:
  - Lennox Lewis – for his laid-back demeanor and lack of focus during his interviews. He also admitted that he needed Piers Morgan throughout the job process.
  - Carol Alt – despite impressing the interviewers with her professionalism. Trump saw a feud brewing between Trace Adkins and Piers Morgan, and finding it an interesting "good vs. evil" situation, he decided to see the men battle it out in the final task, therefore defying the interviewers' recommendation (as they didn't like Piers Morgan at all) and fired Carol Alt in the process.

Donald Trump contradicted the rules that Trump himself set out for this challenge. Trump set out the rules for the challenge being that based on what Jim and Erin said, he would fire two people immediately. Both Jim and Erin acknowledged Piers Morgan's fundraising proficiency, but unequivocally said to Donald Trump that Piers Morgan must not advance to the next round based on personality, both judges ranking Piers Morgan last out of the four remaining candidates. However, Trump advanced Piers Morgan to the final round.

- Task sponsor: Backstreet Boys, Auction Society
- Task scope: Organize a charity auction and concert in the Broad Street Ballroom featuring the Backstreet Boys. The two competitors would need to work together on the task; one would be responsible for decorations and handling the band, the other would be responsible for the appetizers and the charity auction event. Both competitors would vie for a list of items to be donated for the auction, but they would be able to add any other items they could to the auction. The winner would be judged on three aspects: how well they handled their task, how much money their items raised at the auction, and how effectively they handled their teams. Trace selected the decoration and handling of the band task, while Piers took over the food and auction events.
- Judges: Donald Trump, Ivanka Trump, and Donald Trump Jr.
- Notes:
  - As opposed to seasons four through six in the traditional format, interviews were conducted before the final task, and like seasons one and two of the civilian edition, there were four people conducting the interviews.
  - Despite having two failures and no victories as a project manager, Trace Adkins made into the final over Carol Alt and Lennox Lewis, who both had two successful stints as project manager.
  - Trump brought back four fired celebrity candidates, and let the final candidates Piers Morgan and Trace Adkins choose them as teammates. A coin flip was used to decide who goes first. Trace Adkins went first and chose Marilu Henner and Lennox Lewis to be on his team. Piers Morgan chose Stephen Baldwin and Carol Alt for his team.

=== Episode 13: Season Finale: Under the Hammer ===
- Airdate: March 27, 2008
- Task Sponsor: None
- Task Scope: The task scope, introduced during the previous episode, was to organize a charity auction and concert featuring the Backstreet Boys.
- Judges: Donald Trump, Donald Trump Jr., Ivanka Trump
- Named the Celebrity Apprentice/Winner: Piers Morgan – for raising the most money in the process by a wide margin, beating Trace Adkins by a nearly 5:1 ratio even before the final prize money was taken into account.
- Runner Up: Trace Adkins – for raising less money than Piers Morgan in the final task, and for his less impressive overall track record in the competition.
- Notes:
  - Piers Morgan became the first ever Apprentice to have lost a task as project manager (loss in week 5).
  - This episode featured two first-time occurrences for The Apprentice: a live satellite feed from overseas (Tokyo, Japan) for Gene Simmons' appearance and the first live musical performance from one of the candidates with Trace Adkins singing.
  - The episode aired live from Studio 8H at Rockefeller Center, the same studio that served as the home for The Apprentice Season 1 finale. The studio is also home to Saturday Night Live.
  - Piers raised $376,000 with his auction items and $12,000 through the ticket sales. Trace raised $64,000 with his auction items and $38,000 through the ticket sales. As opposed to previous episodes, the proceeds went directly to both individual charities, instead of going entirely to the winners charity. As of the 3rd celebrity series, Piers had the record for the most money earned on the show. However, this record was later broken by Marlee Matlin in the 4th celebrity series, where she raised $1,000,000.
  - Given his crowning as this season's "Best Business Brain", Piers earned $250,000 for his win coming to a total of roughly $750,000 for his charity during the series' run. Piers was the show's only winner to have been the top fundraiser for the season even before the $250,000 prize was taken into account, until this record was later matched in The Celebrity Apprentice 6 ironically by Trace Adkins.
  - As part of his strategy in the finale, Piers gave 20 tickets, of his allotted 50, to the injured soldiers he invited to the charity event, sacrificing a loss on ticket sales to Trace, and not providing food during the auction to allow celebrities to get "drunk".
  - Some of the celebrities that Trace called for help with donations include: Ronnie Milsap, Eddie Montgomery of Montgomery Gentry, and Dean Sams of Lonestar.
  - Some of the celebrities that Piers called for help with donations include: Simon Cowell, Andrew Lloyd Webber, and Sharon Osbourne.
  - Trace Adkins was never fired.
  - Tiffany Fallon was heavily pregnant at the finale.
  - Gene Simmons was unable to attend.
  - In an unaired scene available on the web, Trump gave Marilu Henner's charity a $20,000 donation because he felt she deserved to win money for her charity.
  - In team records, Trace Adkins was 6–5 with a project manager record of 0–2. Piers Morgan was 9–2 and 2–1 as a project manager.
  - At one point Trace said he found new appreciation in himself after working with the Backstreet Boys. He thought they were making excuses not to perform, because they felt they couldn't go on because they didn't have any wheatgrass juice while Trace said he still performed with kidney stones and broken legs.
  - Leading up to the finale, Piers sought advice from his friend and presenter of Apprentice UK, Lord Alan Sugar, on how to win. Lord Sugar outlined the tactics Piers should employ, blow by blow, on how to box Donald Trump into a corner such that he would have no alternative but to pronounce Piers the winner. Piers duly followed Lord Sugar's advice and won Celebrity Apprentice US.
