= Maeve Harris =

American painter

- Born: Maeve Harris; September 1, 1976 (age 50); New Jersey, United States
- Known for: Painting
- Notable work: Wonder Woman
- Movement: abstract art

Maeve Harris (born September 1, 1976 in New Jersey) is an American abstract painter based in Seattle, noted for merging "nature and the abstract".

== Career ==
Her paintings were featured prominently on episodes of the TV show The Celebrity Apprentice. Her paintings have appeared in posters. She was represented by New Era in 2002 and exclusively by Grand Image Limited in 2003 and 2005. Her paintings are abstract renditions of outdoor natural scenes including dragonflies, ponies, and flowers. She commented: "An important element in my work is beauty. I believe that concept or idea can interest the viewer as long as the artist is sensitive to aesthetic." She uses a variety of inks and pigments to mix color and light into different natural and organic forms. She uses rollers and spray cans as well as brushes.

In 2008, her paintings appeared in seven locations on the set of the NBC TV show The Celebrity Apprentice, including a "huge abstract in The Donald's boardroom that was right behind everyone as they got fired." She paints in Pioneer Square Studio and belongs to the national online art gallery Artaissance.
