= Unhinged (book) =

2018 memoir by Omarosa Manigault

Unhinged: An Insider's Account of the Trump White House
- Author: Omarosa Manigault Newman
- Subject: Ethics, leadership
- Genre: Memoir
- Published: August 14, 2018
- Publisher: Gallery Books
- Publication place: United States
- Media type: Print, e-book, audiobook
- Pages: 366
- ISBN: 978-1982109707 (hardcover)

Unhinged: An Insider's Account of the Trump White House is a memoir by Omarosa Manigault Newman, who served as the Director of Communication for the Office of Public Liaison in the Trump administration from 2017 through 2018, that recalls her time working for Donald Trump. The book was released on August 14, 2018. The book topped The New York Times Best Seller list on August 23, 2018.

== Background ==
Omarosa Manigault Newman met Donald Trump while she was a contestant on the first season of The Apprentice. She continued to appear with Trump on The Celebrity Apprentice and The Ultimate Merger. In July 2016, she joined Trump's 2016 presidential campaign as the Director of African-American Outreach. Following Trump's victory, she joined the Trump administration as Director of Communications for the Office of Public Liaison. She was fired by John F. Kelly, White House Chief of Staff, in December 2017.

In the book, Manigault Newman labels Trump a "racist", and states that witnesses have confirmed the existence of tapes of Trump repeatedly saying "nigger" during filming of The Apprentice. She stated that Trump's cognitive functioning is declining, and that she turned down an offer made by Lara Trump of a $15,000 per month "senior position" in Trump's 2020 re-election campaign, which came with a non-disclosure agreement that was as "harsh and restrictive" as she had seen in her television career.

=== Taped White House conversations ===
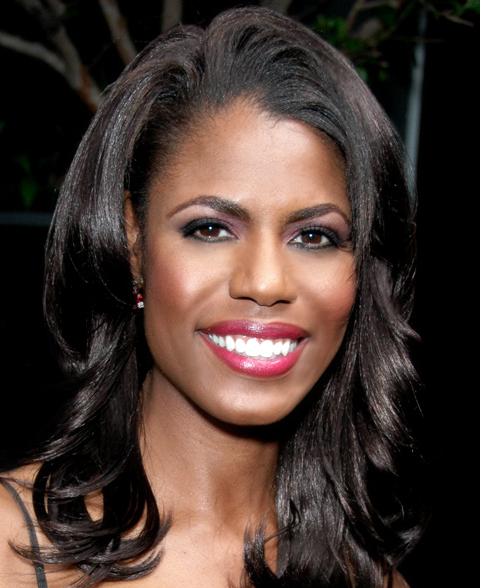
Omarosa Manigault

Manigault Newman had made secret audio recordings while working at the White House as part of the Trump administration and released some before and some after the book came out.

She played a recording of Kelly firing her during an August 12 appearance on the NBC morning program Meet the Press. Manigault Newman also released a tape in which several Trump advisers discuss the potential existence of a tape in which Trump uses the "n-word" and how to deal with the fallout if it was ever made public. Manigault Newman made the accusation that this discussion took place and released the tape after Katrina Pierson, the spokesperson for Eric Trump, denied on Fox News that such a conversation took place.

Another released tape appears to confirm Manigault Newman's claim that Lara Trump, President Trump's daughter-in-law, promised her a $15,000 per month "senior position" on the 2020 Trump campaign, if she kept quiet. The offer was made after Manigault Newman had already left the White House. According to Manigault Newman, the offer was an "attempt to buy my silence".

=== Responses by the Trump administration ===
White House Press Secretary Sarah Huckabee Sanders said that the book is "riddled with lies and false accusations", and accused Manigault Newman of "trying to profit off these false attacks". Trump reacted by referring to Manigault Newman as a "lowlife" and "that dog".

=== Legal action by the Trump campaign ===
The Trump campaign filed for arbitration against Manigault Newman for allegedly violating a confidentiality agreement she signed in 2016. The campaign hired Charles Harder, who previously represented the Trump campaign in legal action taken against Michael Wolff following the publication of his book, Fire and Fury. Simon & Schuster proceeded with the publication of the book despite receiving a warning letter from Harder.

The case, which was decided in favor of Manigault Newman on September 27, 2021, means she can "collect legal fees from the Trump campaign".
