= Omarosa Manigault Newman =

American TV personality and political aide (born 1974)

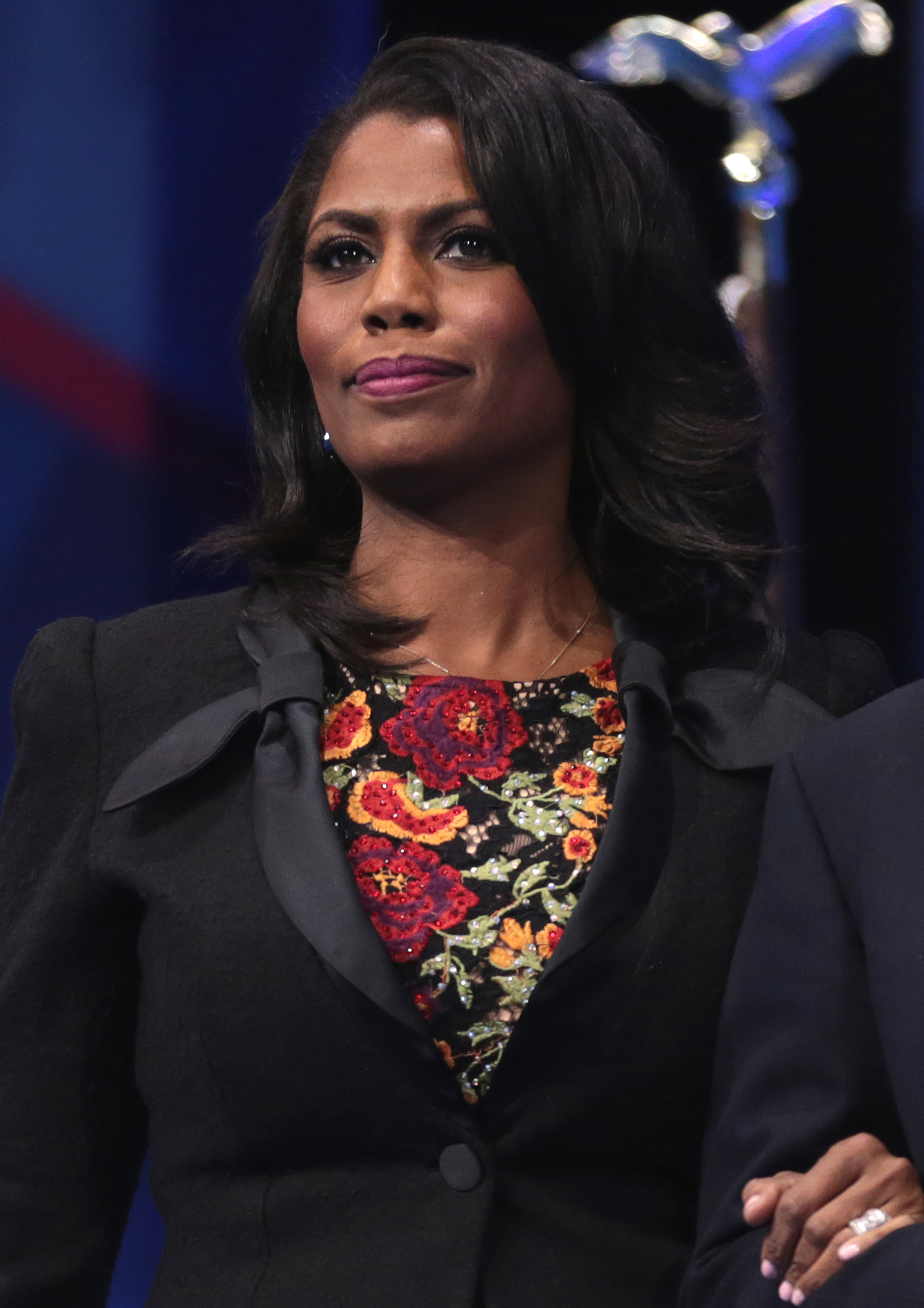
- Omarosa in 2018
- Born: Omarosa Onee Manigault; February 5, 1974 (age 52); Youngstown, Ohio, U.S.
- Education: Central State University (BA); Howard University (MA); United Theological Seminary (attended); Payne Theological Seminary (attended); Southern University (JD, MBA)
- Political party: Democratic (before 2015); Republican (2015–2019); Independent (2019–present)
- Spouses: Aaron Stallworth (m. 2000; div. 2005); John Newman (m. 2017)
- Partner: Michael Clarke Duncan (2010–2012; his death)

Omarosa Onee Newman (/ˌoʊməˈroʊsə ˈmænɪɡɔːlt/; née Manigault; born February 5, 1974), known as Omarosa, is an American reality television star, author, former political consultant and White House aide. She held White House staff roles during the presidential terms of Bill Clinton and Donald Trump. She rose to prominence as a contestant on the first season of NBC's The Apprentice and has remained in the public eye largely through recurring roles on reality television, with additional visibility from television interviews and appearances on political programs.

Newman became assistant to the President and director of communications for the Office of Public Liaison during the Trump administration in January 2017. However, on December 13, 2017, White House Chief of Staff John Kelly fired Newman, citing "money and integrity issues", as well as "inappropriate use of company vehicles". Afterwards, she competed twice on the Big Brother reality series – in 2018 on the first season of Celebrity Big Brother, placing 5th, and in 2021 on Big Brother Australia VIP, placing 12th.

In August 2018, Newman published Unhinged, detailing her tenure at the White House and criticizing Trump and his administration. Two days before the book was released, she released the first of as many as 200 secret tapes she recorded during her White House tenure. As of May 23, 2022, she had released four tapes. The first tape released, which was secretly recorded inside the Situation Room, was described as "one of the worst White House security breaches ever," though the tape is thought not to violate the Espionage Act.

On March 15, 2020, Newman was forced to pay $61,585 to the US Treasury for her violation of the Ethics in Government Act, in what the judge described as "willful violation" after receiving "countless reminders" to submit her final financial disclosure after being fired from her position in the White House.

== Early life and career ==
Newman was born in Youngstown, Ohio, the daughter of Theresa Marie Walker and Jack Thomas Manigault. Newman's father died when she was seven years old. After graduating from The Rayen School in Youngstown, she earned a bachelor's degree in communications with a concentration in radio in 1996 at Central State University in Wilberforce, Ohio. She later moved to Washington, D.C., to attend Howard University, where she earned a master's degree and worked toward a doctorate in communications, but did not finish. She temporarily served as a facilitator and presenter at Howard University. Newman has also received biblical studies training at Payne Theological Seminary in Wilberforce, Ohio.

In the 1990s, Newman worked in the office of Vice President Al Gore during the Clinton administration. She later said the job had been "a very difficult environment, because they don't believe in training. They just kind of throw you in the fire." Gore's former office administrator, Mary Margaret Overbey, said in 2017 that Newman "was the worst hire we ever made." In her resume, Newman later described her job duties as a "senior scheduling and advance coordinator" in charge of Gore's schedule, though former Gore staffers told The New York Times that she was only in charge of responding to invitations. She was later transferred to Clinton's Commerce Department via the White House personnel office. Cheryl Shavers, who then served as the Commerce Department's Undersecretary for Technology Administration, said that Newman was "unqualified and disruptive," adding, "I had her removed."

== Reality television career ==
=== First and seventh seasons of The Apprentice and The Ultimate Merger ===
Newman first came to public attention in 2004 after becoming a participant on the first season of NBC's reality television series The Apprentice. Stemming from her confrontational persona on The Apprentice (particularly in its boardroom segments), Newman soon became the "woman America loved to hate" and was named by E! as "reality TV's number one bad girl". Newman has disagreed with the "villain" label, rather believing herself to be "a shrewd businesswoman", asserting that when a man behaves assertively, he is seen as strong, but when a woman does so, she is portrayed negatively. Newman has also claimed the show's producers manipulated footage of her to make her look like the villain. She was "fired" in week 9.

In January 2008, Newman participated in the first season of The Apprentice's sequel show, The Celebrity Apprentice; she became the only former Apprentice participant to be invited back to the series. On The Celebrity Apprentice, she quickly became embroiled in a personal feud with fellow contestant Piers Morgan. She was eventually fired in the 10th episode, after serving as the project manager of the team that, according to Trump, suffered "the biggest slaughter in the history of The Apprentice" in a challenge to sell artwork against a team led by Morgan. She raised $49,000 in total for her charity.

In June 2010, Newman and Trump collaborated to create a dating show called The Ultimate Merger, with 12 men competing for her affections. The show aired on TV One.

=== Thirteenth season of The Apprentice ===
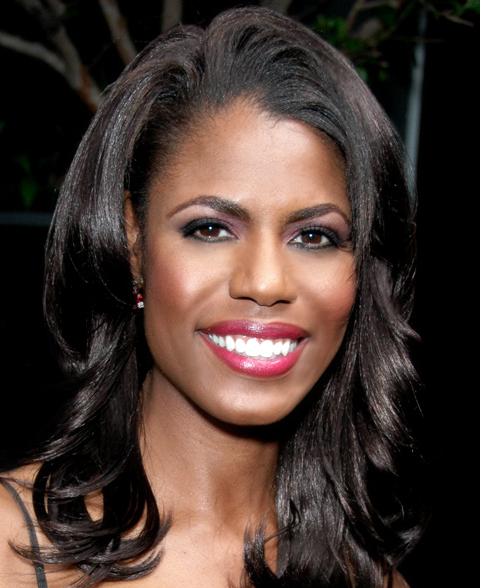
Omarosa in 2008

In February 2013, Newman returned to television and The Apprentice, appearing on Trump's All-Star Celebrity Apprentice. She quickly marshalled her team to an early victory on the show, winning a task involving the creation of a photo booth at Universal Orlando. In a later episode, Lil Jon's team was brought back to the boardroom after they lost. Piers Morgan remarked, "my argument against you has always been that you're not a celebrity... and you don't have star power," which led to a heated argument that resulted in Trump firing Newman. On Late Night with Jimmy Fallon, when asked by Jimmy Fallon whether or not she felt the show set her up by having Piers Morgan act as one of the judges, Newman answered, "I felt like I was competing against Piers, as well as the other contestants." Newman also noted that when she sees Morgan's show canceled in a year, it will be "the best revenge". Omarosa filed a lawsuit against Latoya Jackson following the finale of The Apprentice 2013.

=== Controversy ===
On The Oprah Winfrey Show in 2004, Newman accused fellow Apprentice participant Ereka Vetrini of calling her the "n-word", a claim Vetrini has denied. Shortly after that appearance, Newman didn't attend a scheduled appearance on the Jimmy Kimmel Live! show after she reportedly objected upon seeing a polygraph machine.

Following her stint on Celebrity Apprentice: All Stars, Newman lashed out at La Toya Jackson over Jackson's remarks that insinuated that Newman had murdered her fiancé, Michael Clarke Duncan. Jackson made the remarks in Celebrity Apprentice confessionals and in following media interviews.

When asked about the probability of suing La Toya Jackson, Newman said:

I've been in reality TV for a very long time, and I think that those were probably some of the most disgusting, despicable statements I've ever heard. And it will go down as some of the ugliest comments ever spoken on reality TV, but I have an incredible legal team who I've handed that all over to, and I'm sure they will handle her accordingly.

=== Celebrity Big Brother ===
Newman appeared on the first season of Celebrity Big Brother, a spin-off of the Big Brother series. The show aired on the CBS network, February 7 to 25, 2018. Newman remained in the game throughout that time, surviving elimination and winning multiple competitions right up until the finale, where she was one of the last five contestants standing. At one point, host Julie Chen Moonves speculated that Newman could win the entire season. Throughout the season, she expressed her objections to working with Donald Trump and his administration as well as claims about her White House experience. Many of these political revelations garnered significant media attention and headline news. Newman placed fifth being evicted in a 2–0 house vote.

=== Big Brother VIP ===
In 2021, Newman competed on Big Brother VIP, the celebrity edition of Australian Big Brother. Newman was nominated for the first eviction by Caitlyn Jenner, and subsequently evicted in a 5–3–2 house vote.

== Trump presidential campaign and administration ==
In a 2015 Washington Post article, Omarosa identified as a "die-hard" Hillary supporter. She has been a registered Democrat for over a decade. However her personal relationship with the Republican presidential candidate Donald Trump prevailed and during the Republican National Convention in July 2016, it was announced she had been named director of African-American outreach for Donald Trump's presidential campaign. In September 2016, she said in an interview with Frontline: "Every critic, every detractor, will have to bow down to President Trump. It's everyone who's ever doubted Donald, whoever disagreed, whoever challenged him. It is the ultimate revenge to become the most powerful man in the universe." Shortly after Trump won the election, Newman stated that Trump has an "enemies" list of Republicans who voted against him.

In December 2016, Newman was announced as one of nine additional members to Trump's presidential transition team. Unlike the rest of President Trump's inner circle appointments, Omarosa didn't have any roots in the Republican party or otherwise conservative or right wing activism. In December 2016, she accompanied former NFL stars Ray Lewis and Jim Brown to meet with Trump at Trump Tower.

On January 3, 2017, it was reported that Newman would join Trump's White House staff, focusing on public engagement. Her specific title was made public the next day as assistant to the President and director of communications for the Office of Public Liaison. In her first interview after being named to the Trump White House, Newman told Megyn Kelly that she was a "Trumplican" and had switched her political affiliation to the Republican Party. Newman said she hoped more African Americans would follow her lead and do the same, and accused Democrats of taking African-American voters for granted and making empty promises to them.

In June 2017, Newman invited the Congressional Black Caucus (CBC) to visit the White House, signing the invitation as "the Honorable Omarosa Manigault". Some members of the CBC took exception to her use of the title, which is neither customary for political aides nor typically self-applied. The CBC ultimately declined the invitation. In August 2017, Newman was on a panel about losing loved ones to violence at the National Association of Black Journalists convention in New Orleans, Louisiana. She became involved in a shouting match with moderator and fellow panelist Ed Gordon because his questions to her focused on Trump's policies and not her personal history with losing family members to violence.

=== Departure ===
On December 13, 2017, the White House announced Newman's resignation, effective January 20, 2018. The United States Secret Service stated the agency was not involved in the termination process or escorting/removing Newman from the complex. The Secret Service's only involvement in the matter was to deactivate her access pass. CNN White House correspondent April Ryan reported that White House Chief of Staff John F. Kelly fired Newman, but she disputed the account, stating that she resigned. But Newman had secretly taped her firing, and gave the tape to Chuck Todd to play on his NBC program Meet The Press on August 12, 2018. This tape caused some controversy, as Newman had brought a recording device into the highly secret White House Situation Room, which was used for several important events in American history like the raid on Osama bin Laden's compound.

In February 2018, Newman publicly criticized the Trump administration on the reality television program Celebrity Big Brother, and stated that she would not vote for Trump again.

=== After the Trump administration ===
Newman wrote a book deeply critical of Trump titled Unhinged, which went on sale on August 14, 2018, in which she labels Trump a racist, and states that witnesses have confirmed the existence of tapes of Trump repeatedly using the word "nigger" during the filming of The Apprentice. During an interview, fellow contestant Penn Jillette appeared to confirm this, saying, "Yeah, I was in the room" when asked, though without elaborating on what Trump said, and later stood by his comment, saying "I was careful" and "I’ve been told it’s clear". White House press secretary Sarah Huckabee Sanders said that the book is "riddled with lies and false accusations" and accused Newman of "trying to profit off these false attacks." When questioned about whether she could say with certainty Trump had never said the "n-word", Sanders said she "can't guarantee anything". Some journalists deemed Newman an unreliable narrator. Newman said that she had turned down an offer of a $15,000 per month "senior position" in the Trump 2020 re-election campaign from Lara Trump, President Trump's daughter-in-law, which came with a non-disclosure agreement (NDA) that was as "harsh and restrictive" as any she had seen in her television career. The president sought to enforce the NDA in an August 2018 filing with the American Arbitration Association, which was rejected in September 2021, directing the Trump campaign to pay Newman's legal fees. After the parties disputed the amount of the settlement, the arbitrator set it to $1.3 million in April 2022.

In May 2019, Manigault Newman joined a collective legal action against the Trump campaign organization for allegedly violating the Equal Pay Act. The legal action was instigated earlier that year, when the former Trump campaign staffer Alva Johnson filed a lawsuit against the president in federal court and accused him of sexual assault during the 2016 presidential campaign. Johnson had additionally claimed that "women of color were paid less than white men" with similar or less professional responsibilities on the campaign trail.

== Personal life ==
Newman had an older brother, Jack Thomas Manigault Jr., who was murdered in 2011.

In 2000, Newman married Aaron Stallworth and changed her last name to Manigault-Stallworth. They separated, and later divorced, in 2005. She reverted to her maiden name, and eventually started using her first name mononymously.

In August 2009, Newman enrolled at the United Theological Seminary in Ohio to pursue a Doctor of Ministry degree. She received a preacher's license in February 2011 from her church (Weller Street Missionary Baptist Church in Los Angeles, California) and was formally ordained on February 27, 2012. In February 2012, Newman was working on finishing her degree at Payne Theological Seminary. She said on Oprah: Where Are They Now? that she is an ordained Baptist minister. In the segment, Newman said that she was brought to the decision after traveling to West Africa, where she found herself alone in an orphanage with a little girl dying of AIDS.

Newman said, of her interaction with the little girl:

It was at that moment, looking into the face, in the eyes of this dying child that I received my call to the ministry. Upon returning to the United States, I put reality television on hold. I put everything on hold and returned to seminary full-time ... There were people who felt like because I had done the show so many years ago that maybe that disqualified me from the ministry. I'm not really certain. But boy did I hear from the critics, and to them I have to say that they underestimate the power of God's ability to transform a person's life.

On August 13, 2010, Newman confirmed that she was dating actor Michael Clarke Duncan, whom she had met in the produce section of a Whole Foods supermarket. In July 2012, she found Duncan in cardiac arrest and performed CPR. Though Newman was able to resuscitate him, he never fully recovered from the heart attack and died on September 3, 2012, after two months in the hospital. Seven months after his death and according to Duncan's family and friends, Newman was under suspicion of changing his will and testament. Duncan's family and friends also claimed that she lied about her engagement, and sold Duncan's belongings without the family's knowledge.

She married John Allen Newman on April 8, 2017, at Trump's Washington, D.C., hotel in the Presidential Ballroom of the Old Post Office Pavilion. After the wedding, Newman took her bridal party to do a photo shoot in the White House, but she was unable to post her photos because of concerns over ethics and security. John Newman is the senior pastor of The Sanctuary at Mt. Calvary, a church in Jacksonville, Florida.

In 2022 and 2023, she competed in the Case Classic Mock Trial Competition against Hannah Sylvester and Spencer Conley. In 2023, she also competed at Bloomberg Law Presents: The Crimson Cup. In 2025, she won "Outstanding Witness" at the Phi Alpha Delta Mock Trial Competition awards with the Tureaud Chapter, Team 1. On May 17, 2025, Omarosa completed studies at the Southern University Law Center with a JD/MBA (dual degree).

== Television ==
Year	Show	Notes
2004	The Apprentice	8th place
2004	Girls Behaving Badly	Season 4, episode 15
2005	Fear Factor	4th place
2005	The Surreal Life	Season 5
2007	I Love New York	Season 1, episode 3
2008	The Celebrity Apprentice	6th place
2008	The Wendy Williams Show	Guest
2009	The Great Debate	Commentary
2010	The Ultimate Merger	Host
2010	The Arrangement	Season 1, episode 5
2012	The Eric Andre Show	Guest
2013	All-Star Celebrity Apprentice	10th place
2013	Oprah: Where Are They Now?	Guest
2013	The Wendy Williams Show	Guest
2013	Bethenny	Guest
2017	Say Yes to the Dress	Season 15, episode 5
2018	Celebrity Big Brother 1	5th place
2018	The Talk	Guest
2018	The Late Show with Stephen Colbert	Guest
2018	The Daily Show with Trevor Noah	Guest
2019	Celebrity Big Brother 2	Guest host
2021	Big Brother Australia VIP	1st evicted
2022	Married to Medicine	Season 9, episode 3; Season 9, episode 12
2023	House of Villains	6th place
2025	Got to Get Out	Contestant
2026	Celebrity Weakest Link	Season 2, episode 1

== Books ==
- The Bitch Switch: Knowing How to Turn It On and Off, 2008
- Art My Way: Momarosa's Guide to Living a Vibrant Energetic Life, 2010
- Unhinged: An Insider's Account of the Trump White House, 2018

== See also ==
- List of former Trump administration officials who endorsed Kamala Harris
- List of Republicans who oppose the Donald Trump 2024 presidential campaign
