= Dan Scavino =

American political advisor (born 1976)

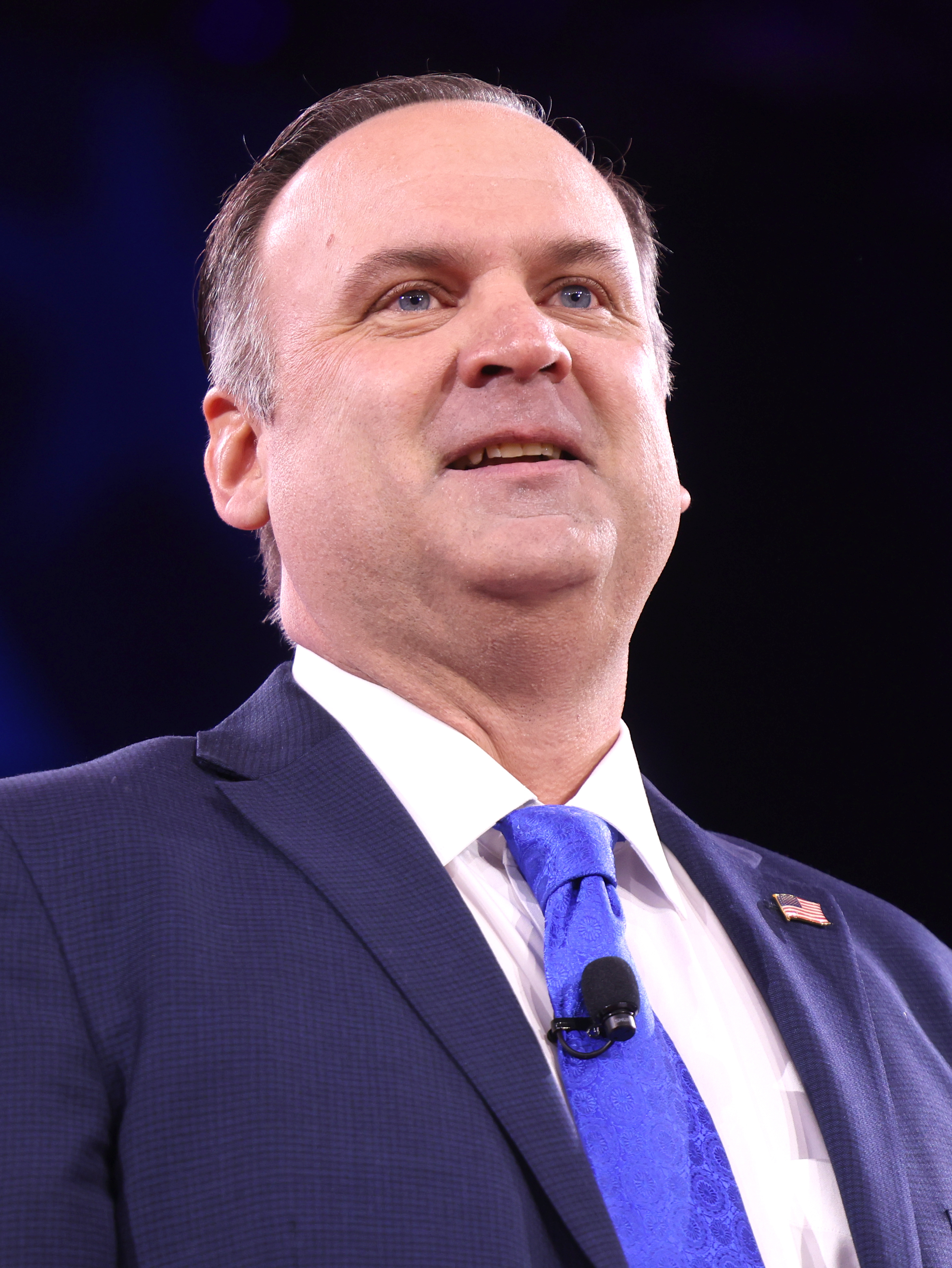
- Scavino in 2025

Director of the White House Presidential Personnel Office
- Incumbent
- Assumed office October 13, 2025
- President: Donald Trump
- Deputy: Morgan DeWitt-Snow
- Preceded by: Sergio Gor

White House Deputy Chief of Staff
- Incumbent
- Assumed office January 20, 2025
- President: Donald Trump
- Preceded by: Emma Doyle

White House Deputy Chief of Staff for Communications
- In office April 21, 2020 – January 20, 2021
- President: Donald Trump
- Preceded by: Bill Shine
- Succeeded by: Taylor Budowich (Note: As Deputy Chief of Staff for Communications and Personnel.)

Senior Advisor to the President for Digital Strategy
- In office April 12, 2019 – January 20, 2021
- President: Donald Trump
- Preceded by: Position established
- Succeeded by: Patrick Stevenson

White House Director of Social Media
- In office January 20, 2017 – April 12, 2019
- President: Donald Trump
- Preceded by: Position established
- Succeeded by: Position abolished

Personal details
- Born: Daniel Joseph Scavino Jr. January 14, 1976 (age 50) New York, U.S.
- Spouses: Jennifer Nathan (m. 2000; div. 2018); Erin Elmore (m. 2026)
- Children: 2
- Education: State University of New York, Plattsburgh (BA)

Daniel Joseph Scavino Jr. (born January 14, 1976) is an American political advisor and former golf club manager who has served as the director of the White House Presidential Personnel Office since October 2025 and the White House deputy chief of staff since January 2025. Scavino served as the White House deputy chief of staff for communications from 2020 to 2021, as the senior advisor for digital strategy from 2019 to 2021, and as the White House director of social media from 2017 to 2019.

Scavino studied speech communication at the State University of New York, Plattsburgh, graduating in 1998. After graduating, he worked for The Coca-Cola Company and the pharmaceutical company Galderma. In January 2004, Scavino became the assistant manager of Trump National Golf Club Westchester. He was promoted to the club's general manager two years later and appointed as its executive vice president in 2008. Scavino joined Donald Trump's 2016 presidential campaign as an aide in June 2015, later becoming the campaign's director of social media. He retained his position in Trump's first presidency. In April 2019, he became the senior advisor for digital strategy. The following year, he was appointed as the deputy chief of staff for communications by chief of staff Mark Meadows.

After Trump's loss in the 2020 presidential election, Scavino remained with him at Mar-a-Lago and assisted him politically. The House Select Committee to Investigate the January 6th Attack on the United States Capitol subpoenaed Scavino in September 2021; for evading the committee, the House of Representatives voted to hold Scavino in contempt of Congress in April 2022, though the Department of Justice declined to prosecute him after he negotiated the terms of the subpoena. By January 2023, Scavino had joined Trump's 2024 presidential campaign. In November 2024, Trump named Scavino as his deputy chief of staff. After Sergio Gor was confirmed as the U.S. ambassador to India in October 2025, Trump appointed Scavino as the head of the White House Presidential Personnel Office.

== Early life and education (1976–1998) ==
Daniel Joseph Scavino was born on January 14, 1976, in Yorktown, New York, United States. Scavino was the son of Daniel and Katherine Scavino. Daniel was a teacher at Mahopac High School, while Katherine was a stay-at-home mother. A young Catholic, Scavino was present for the World Youth Day in 1993; Scavino later recalled to Gannett News that he kissed Pope John Paul II's ring twelve years later, months before his death. He graduated from Yorktown High School, where he played tight end and defensive end on the school's football team, in 1994.

Scavino attended the State University of New York, Plattsburgh, majoring in speech communication. As a freshman, he was a caddie and bag room assistant at Briar Hall Country Club, where he met Donald Trump. Trump acquired the club and renamed it to Trump National Golf Club Westchester in 1996, and Scavino continued to work there through college. In his junior year, Scavino was a public relations intern for Walt Disney World in Florida. Scavino was named to the university's dean's list twice in 1997 and once in 1998, when he graduated.

== Early career ==
=== Business management (1998–2015) ===
After graduating, Scavino worked for The Coca-Cola Company. By August 2000, he had become a business development manager and was pursuing a master's degree in business management from Iona University. Four years later, Scavino was working at the pharmaceutical company Galderma.

In January 2004, Scavino returned to Trump National Golf Club Westchester as the club's assistant manager, becoming the general manager by April 2006. After the general manager Carolyn Kepcher resigned in August, he was named as acting general manager before being appointed full-time in November. In September 2008, Scavino was appointed as Trump National Golf Club Westchester's executive vice president. Scavino led Trump's acquisition of the Branton Woods Golf Club, later Trump National Golf Club Hudson Valley, in 2009. The Greater Southern Dutchess Chamber of Commerce named Scavino to its "Forty Under 40" list in February 2008 and Golf Inc., a magazine for golf course executives, named him to its "Most Admired Operators" list in May 2009. From 2013 to 2015, he served as the director of the Joe Torre Safe At Home Foundation, an organization to counter domestic violence.

=== Trump campaign (2015–2016) ===
After an unsuccessful attempt to start a consulting firm, Scavino told Donald Trump's son, Eric, that he was interested in joining the elder Trump's potential presidential campaign in 2014. In June 2015, Scavino joined Trump's 2016 campaign. Scavino's assignments involved finding large donors and forming relationships with the Republican National Committee. His role solidified as a general aide, going on food runs to KFC and McDonald's. By December, he specialized in posting videos to Vine. That month, Scavino posted a video of Curtis Sliwa claiming that dozens of American Muslims cheered during the September 11 attacks; Trump used the video and exaggerated the number of alleged participants to "thousands and thousands" of Muslims. Scavino additionally shared a 2012 video of Muslims protesting against a rally held by a far-right group in Germany, falsely stating it showed Muslims rallying for ISIS.

In February 2016, Scavino became Trump's director of social media. He held meetings with Republican National Committee members, including Randy Evans, in an effort to earn the favor of possible delegates. In June, Scavino garnered controversy over an image of Hillary Clinton beside a red six-pointed star decrying her as the "most corrupt candidate ever". The star was taken by some critics as an antisemitic reference to the Star of David. In a statement, Scavino claimed that he had found the image from a Twitter user critical of Clinton and inserted the star, believing it to be a sheriff's badge, using Microsoft Paint; according to Mic, the image was originally found on an imageboard website. Scavino later deleted the image and replaced the star with a circle. According to Politico, Trump's son-in-law Jared Kushner, the campaign manager Paul Manafort, and the communications advisor Jason Miller told Scavino to remove the post.

== First Trump presidency (2017–2021) ==
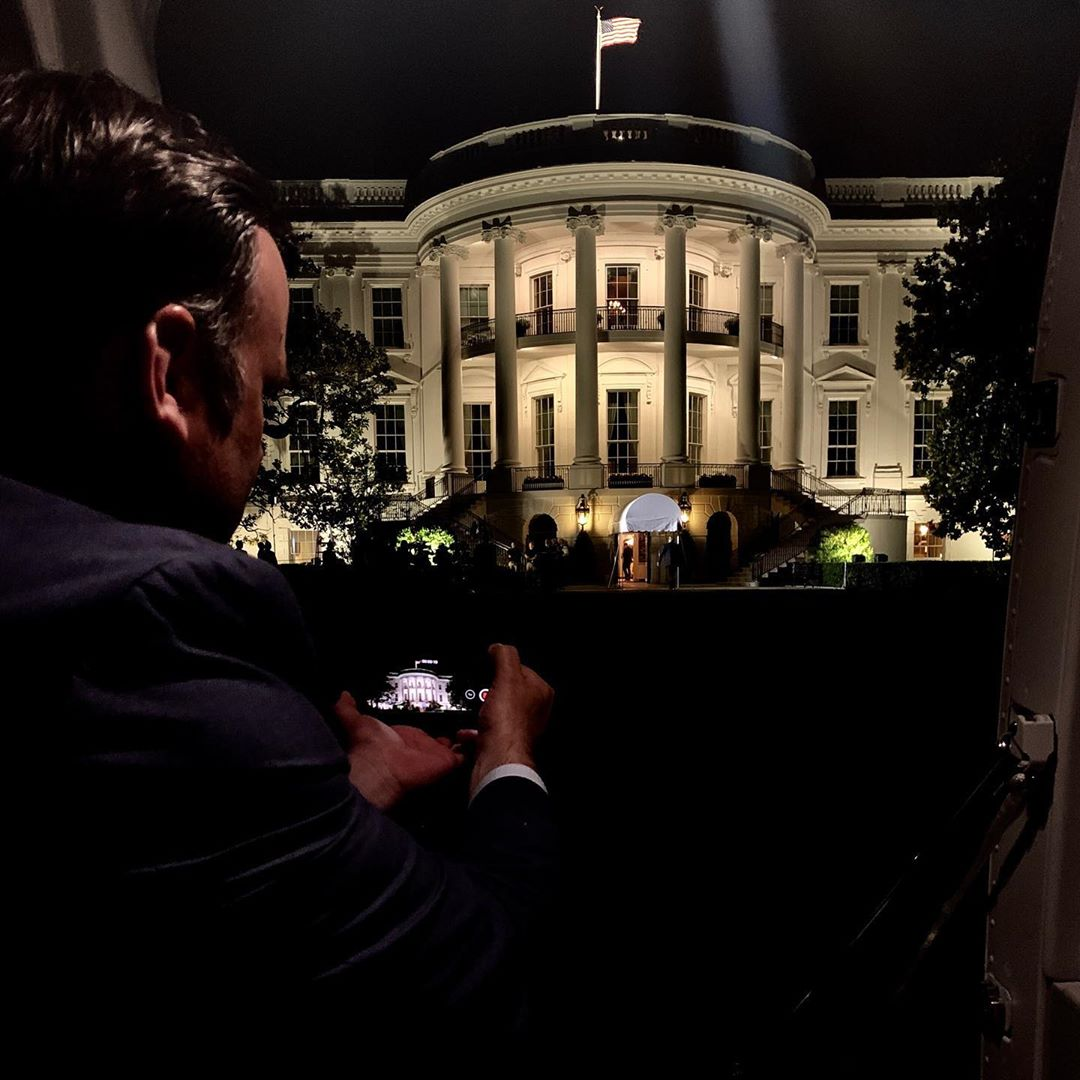
Scavino photographing the White House in 2019, photo by Sean Conley

After Donald Trump defeated Hillary Clinton in the 2016 presidential election, Scavino was named as the director of social media for Trump's first presidential transition the following day. On December 22, Trump named Scavino as the White House director of social media. Prior to Trump's first inauguration, Scavino worked out a strategy with Twitter over the @POTUS account, in which it would be renamed to @POTUS44 and its followers would follow a new account established at @POTUS for Trump. Scavino had access to @POTUS, as well as @realDonaldTrump and @WhiteHouse and their associated Facebook accounts; the @POTUS account's biography noted that its posts were written by Scavino in addition to Trump, whose writings would be denoted with the signature "DJT". Scavino was the only official handling Trump's social media accounts until February 2017, when the Trump administration expanded its social media team.

In February 2017, the Project on Government Oversight requested that attorney general Jeff Sessions investigate Scavino for reposting on @POTUS a post from Trump that defended a fashion line established by Trump's daughter, Ivanka. In April, Scavino urged Republicans to challenge representative Justin Amash in the 2018 United States House of Representatives election for Michigan's third congressional district. The Office of Special Counsel found in June that Scavino's tweet about Amash violated the Hatch Act, though it took no action against him. That month, lawyers for Twitter users blocked by @realDonaldTrump argued that the blocks violate the First Amendment, sending a letter to Scavino, among other aides. He was named in Knight First Amendment Institute v. Trump (2017), a federal lawsuit over the blocks, the following month. Politico described Scavino as "one of the president's most loyal lieutenants" in June, noting that he was involved in imitating Trump's posts and providing Trump with an outlet.

Amid internal strife over Sean Spicer's July 2017 resignation as the press secretary, Scavino remained in the Office of Communications. Scavino was the only remaining Trump campaign staff member in the White House following the resignation of Hope Hicks as communications director in March 2018. According to The New York Times, by June, Scavino was considering leaving. Scavino's role was largely ambiguous; according to the White House, Trump primarily dictated posts for Scavino to send, though his critics argued that Scavino also wrote posts himself. Scavino and Trump's son, Donald Trump Jr., often shared incendiary and alt-right content, according to Politico. As director of social media, Scavino developed a persistent theme paying homage to Game of Thrones (2011–2019). He often praised Trump and, according to Politico, frequently monitored Reddit, including the site's /r/The_Donald community. An investigation by The New York Times in November found that Scavino would assume control of @realDonaldTrump after 10 a.m. Eastern Time, when Trump would arrive in the West Wing, and give Trump suggested posts in degrees of provocativity. His access to Trump's social media accounts posed an opportunity for associates of Trump to amplify their messaging to Trump's audience. In April 2019, Scavino became the senior advisor for digital strategy. Leading up to the shift in Scavino's position, Trump had relied on him less for posting on Twitter. Senator Dianne Feinstein sought Scavino's testimony in connection with Russian interference in the 2016 elections, but she was rebuffed by Republicans.

In April 2020, Mark Meadows, the recently appointed chief of staff, reorganized the communications staff, naming Scavino as the deputy chief of staff for communications. In the COVID-19 pandemic, Scavino and Jared Kushner were said to have been unconcerned over the possibility of contracting COVID-19. In July, he posted a cartoon from Ben Garrison, a cartoonist barred from the White House after his work was found to have engaged in antisemitic tropes, depicting National Institute of Allergy and Infectious Diseases director Anthony Fauci as a faucet drowning the economy in apparent efforts to cancel the 2020 NFL season, impose permanent lockdowns, and close schools. According to Maggie Haberman in Confidence Man (2022), Trump played a video prepared by Scavino downplaying COVID-19 at a White House Coronavirus Task Force briefing.

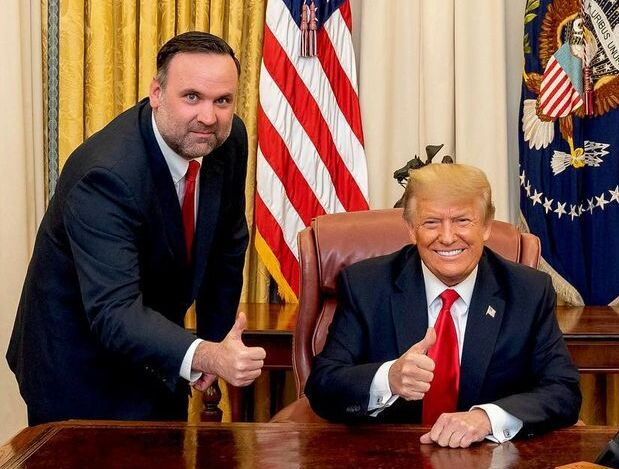
Scavino (left) and Trump (right) on Trump's final full day in office

Scavino spoke at the 2020 Republican National Convention and offered a personal testimonial. Scavino, among other Trump allies, encouraged Trump to participate in efforts to overturn the 2020 presidential election after Trump's loss to Joe Biden. The lawyer Jenna Ellis told Fulton County, Georgia, prosecutors that Scavino told her weeks after the election that Trump refused to leave; after Ellis pushed back, Scavino purportedly said that he and Trump didn't care. According to testimony provided by Scavino in the Smith special counsel investigation, Scavino, joined by Trump aides, sought to calm Trump over his loss as a mob of his supporters stormed the Capitol. Scavino met with Trump to discuss strategy on how to get members of Congress to defy the election certification process, promoted the march that preceded the attack, and posted messages from White House accounts on the day of the attack. He was the longest-serving Trump aide in the administration.

== Between presidencies (2021–2024) ==
Scavino remained with Trump after the 2020 election, leaving the White House for Mar-a-Lago after the inauguration of Joe Biden. In February 2021, he was present in a meeting with Trump advisors to form a political action committee that would become Make America Great Again Action. The following month, Scavino and Brad Parscale, Trump's former campaign manager, developed a plan for Trump to redevelop his online presence. In September, the House Select Committee to Investigate the January 6th Attack on the United States Capitol subpoenaed Scavino, though he was not given the subpoena for several weeks. By March 2022, he had continued to evade the committee. In response, the panel began seeking a criminal prosecution for Scavino. Days later, Biden rejected his effort to assert executive privilege. The following month, the House of Representatives voted to hold Scavino in contempt of Congress. The Department of Justice declined to prosecute him after he negotiated the terms of the subpoena.

By January 2023, Scavino had joined with Trump's 2024 presidential campaign. His posts on social media included promoting the work of several meme creators known collectively as Trump's Online War Machine. Additionally, Scavino served on the board of Truth Social, though he had left it by April 2024. Concurrently, he was involved in the election obstruction investigation and the classified documents investigation into Trump; in the former, Scavino was subpoenaed in September 2022 as part of an intensified effort by the Department of Justice, while in the latter, he appeared before a grand jury in December. Scavino sought to avoid testimony in the election obstruction investigation; his effort was rejected by Judge Beryl Howell, who compelled him to testify in March 2023, and reaffirmed by the Court of Appeals for the District of Columbia Circuit weeks later. Scavino spoke with the special counsel Jack Smith's team after the rulings.

== Second Trump presidency (2025–present) ==
On November 13, 2024, Trump named Scavino as his deputy chief of staff. As Trump's deputy chief of staff, he continued to manage Trump's social media profiles. In February 2025, Trump fired the board of the John F. Kennedy Center for the Performing Arts and named Scavino, among others, to the board. In August, Axios reported that Scavino would succeed Sergio Gor as the director of the White House Presidential Personnel Office. On October 12, Trump announced that Scavino would serve as the director after Gor was confirmed as the U.S. ambassador to India.

== Personal life ==
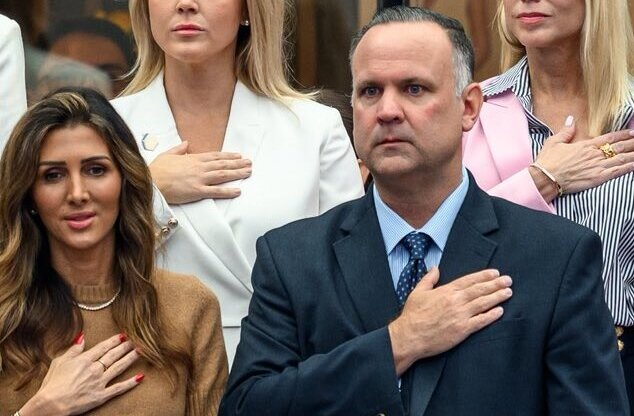
Erin Elmore (left) with Scavino at the US Open – Men's singles in September 2025

In September 2000, Scavino married Jennifer Nathan, a pharmaceutical sales representative at Eli Lilly and Company, at St. Columba Church. The couple settled in Hopewell Junction, New York, and had two children. She filed for divorce from Scavino in January 2018.

Scavino later dated Erin Elmore, the director of Art in Embassies at the Department of State, and announced their engagement in September 2025. The couple married at Mar-a-Lago in February 2026.

== Works cited ==
=== Books ===
- Haberman, Maggie (2022). Confidence Man: The Making of Donald Trump and the Breaking of America. New York: Penguin Press. ISBN 9789029549813.

=== Articles ===
- Acosta, Jim (February 13, 2017). "Amid Trump Twitter controversies, White House preparing to expand social media team". CNN.
- "Area students make the grade". The Citizen Register. July 29, 1998.
- Baker, Peter; Haberman, Maggie (June 19, 2018). "Bush Veteran Joseph Hagin to Leave Trump White House Post". The New York Times.
- Barry, John (February 11, 2016). "Trump campaign hires Hopewell's Scavino for social media". Poughkeepsie Journal.
- Bensinger, Ken (December 13, 2023). "Inside the Troll Army Waging Trump's Online Campaign". The New York Times.
- Bradshaw, Sarah (February 24, 2008). "Forty Under 40*". Poughkeepsie Journal.
- Broadwater, Luke (September 23, 2021). "The Jan. 6 committee subpoenaed top Trump advisers, ramping up its investigation". The New York Times.
- Broadwater, Luke (December 1, 2021). "Possible Contempt Charge Hangs Over Trump Justice Dept. Official". The New York Times.
- Cerbin, Carolyn; Wu, Amy (March 19, 2018). "Wife of Trump aide Dan Scavino files for divorce". Poughkeepsie Journal.
- Cheney, Kyle; Schreckinger, Ben (April 1, 2016). "Delegates ready to flee Trump at contested convention". Politico.
- Cheney, Kyle; Woodruff Swan, Betsy; Wu, Nicholas (November 23, 2021). "Bannon indictment does little to jumpstart Jan. 6 committee's subpoena talks with top targets". Politico.
- Cheney, Kyle; Woodruff Swan, Betsy; Wu, Nicholas (March 24, 2022). "Jan. 6 panel seeks contempt charges for Navarro and Scavino". Politico.
- Cheney, Kyle; Wu, Nicholas (March 27, 2022). "Contempt report: Biden turned down privilege claim by Dan Scavino". Politico.
- Cheney, Kyle (April 4, 2023). "Appeals court rejects Trump's bid to block aides from testifying in Jan. 6 probe". Politico.
- Cohen, Max (July 14, 2020). "Trump aide shares anti-Fauci cartoon drawn by artist barred from the White House over anti-Semitic tropes". Politico.
- Conway, Madeline; Nelson, Louis (July 21, 2017). "White House seeks to downplay discord at first briefing after shake-up". Politico.
- Corcoran, Terry (April 2, 2005). "Pontiff made historic connection with youth". The Ithaca Journal.
- "Dan Scavino: 5 things to know about local Trump staffer who has served through term". Poughkeepsie Journal. January 7, 2021.
- Dawsey, Josh (November 12, 2024). "Donald Trump is expected to announce that James Blair, Taylor Budowich, Dan Scavino and Stephen Miller are all going to be deputy chiefs of staff, per people familiar with the plan who spoke on the condition on anonymity to share personnel decisions that haven't been announced publicly". The Washington Post.
- "Dean's list". The Citizen Register. July 23, 1997.
- Draper, Robert (April 16, 2018). "The Man Behind the President's Tweets". The New York Times Magazine.
- Faulders, Katherine; Levine, Mike; Mallin, Alexander; Steakin, Will; Buchanan, Larry; Collins, Keith (January 7, 2024). "Special counsel probe uncovers new details about Trump's inaction on Jan. 6: Sources". ABC News.
- Fausset, Richard; Hakim, Danny (November 13, 2023). "Lawyer Says Trump Aide Told Her After 2020 Election: 'The Boss Is Not Going to Leave'". The New York Times.
- "FCC incentive auction falls short of expectations". Politico. January 19, 2017.
- Feuer, Alan; Savage, Charlie (December 1, 2022). "Appeals Court Scraps Special Master Review in Trump Documents Case". The New York Times.
- "Five named to dean's list". The Citizen Register. February 1, 1997.
- Gass, Nick (July 5, 2016). "Lewandowski: No 'malice' in Trump star tweet". Politico.
- Gerstein, Josh; Cheney, Kyle; Wu, Nicholas (June 3, 2022). "DOJ declines to charge Meadows, Scavino with contempt of Congress for defying Jan. 6 committee". Politico.
- Gleeson, Jerry (September 1, 2006). "Trump dumps 'Apprentice' sidekick". The Journal News.
- Goldmacher, Shane (December 12, 2016). "Trump close to building out senior White House team". Politico.
- "Golf club names executive vice president". Poughkeepsie Journal. September 9, 2008.
- Haberman, Maggie (April 21, 2020). "Dan Scavino Promoted as Meadows Shuffles White House Communications Team". The New York Times.
- Haberman, Maggie; Broadwater, Luke (October 8, 2021). "Jan. 6 Panel Threatens to Pursue Charges Against Bannon". The New York Times.
- Haberman, Maggie; Feuer, Alan (March 24, 2023). "Former Trump Officials Must Testify in 2020 Election Inquiry, Judge Says". The New York Times.
- Harwell, Drew (April 7, 2024). "Truth Social lost $58 million last year. Here's who made money anyway". The Washington Post.
- Harwell, Drew; Morse, Clare; Davies, Emily (June 3, 2025). "Tallying Trump's online posting frenzy: 2,262 'truths' in 132 days". The Washington Post.
- Hawkinson, Katie (February 2, 2026). "MAGA-world descends on Mar-a-Lago for the wedding of one of Trump's top aides". The Independent.
- Hernández, Javier; Pogrebin, Robin (February 12, 2025). "Trump Made Chair of Kennedy Center as Its President Is Fired". The New York Times.
- "Hopewell Junction man runs Trump club". Poughkeepsie Journal. November 11, 2006.
- "House Oversight Committee asks for review of Conway's endorsement of Ivanka Trump brand". ABC News. February 9, 2017.
- Isenstadt, Alex; Vogel, Kenneth (December 8, 2016). "Trump 'originals' say they're getting frozen out". Politico.
- Isenstadt, Alex (February 25, 2021). "Trump shares plans for new super PAC in Mar-a-Lago meeting". Politico.
- Isenstadt, Alex (August 26, 2025). "Dan Scavino takes over hiring in Trump's White House". Axios.
- Johnson, Eliana (June 10, 2017). "Dan Scavino is the other @realdonaldtrump". Politico.
- Karni, Annie (November 29, 2017). "John Kelly's losing battle with Trump's Twitter feed". Politico.
- Karni, Annie (August 27, 2020). "Dan Scavino, who shapes Trump's tweets, claims the president shows 'endless kindness.'". The New York Times.
- Karni, Annie; Haberman, Maggie (October 3, 2020). "A White House Long in Denial Confronts Reality". The New York Times.
- Kaczynski, Andrew; McDermott, Nathan (December 21, 2015). "Trump Adviser Smears Syrian Refugees With Debunked Video". BuzzFeed News.
- Kumar, Anita; McGraw, Meridith; Grunwald, Michael (January 20, 2021). "Donald Trump leaves as he arrived, minus his microphone". Politico.
- Lipton, Eric (June 9, 2017). "White House Official's Political Tweet Was Illegal, Agency Says". The New York Times.
- Mackey, Robert (December 2, 2015). "Claim That Video Backs Donald Trump's Assertion of Mass 9/11 Celebrations Is Debunked". The New York Times.
- McCaskill, Nolan (November 10, 2016). "Trump: I can't get started soon enough". Politico.
- McGraw, Meridith; Kumar, Anita (November 19, 2020). "Trump gins up TV theatrics in election fight as lawsuits fizzle". Politico.
- Meyer, Theodoric (April 2, 2017). "Freedom Caucus' Jordan responds to Trump primary threat". Politico.
- Montague, Zach (September 4, 2023). "Peter Navarro to Face Contempt Trial Over Defiance of Jan. 6 Committee". The New York Times.
- "Most Admired Operators 2009". Golf Inc. May 31, 2009.
- Orr, Gabby; McGraw, Meridith (March 24, 2021). "Don't expect a @realDonaldTrump comeback". Politico.
- "Nathan-Scavino". Poughkeepsie Journal. August 3, 2000.
- "Playing the Trump Card". Hudson Valley. April 9, 2009.
- Piper, Jessica; McGraw, Meridith (January 31, 2023). "Trump committee burns through cash in early months, new filings show". Politico.
- Restuccia, Andrew; Lippman, Daniel; Johnson, Eliana (May 16, 2019). "'Get Scavino in here': Trump's Twitter guru is the ultimate insider". Politico.
- Rogers, Katie; Haberman, Maggie (March 29, 2018). "Hope Hicks Is Gone, and It's Not Clear Who Can Replace Her". The New York Times.
- Samuelsohn, Darren; Frostenson, Sarah; Lin, Jeremy (January 21, 2018). "The 332 people connected to the Russia probes". Politico.
- Savage, Charlie (June 6, 2017). "Twitter Users Blocked by Trump Seek Reprieve, Citing First Amendment". The New York Times.
- Savage, Charlie (July 11, 2017). "Twitter Users Blocked by Trump File Lawsuit". The New York Times.
- "Scavino interning in Florida". The Citizen Register. January 24, 1997.
- "Scavino-Nathan". Poughkeepsie Journal. January 18, 2001.
- Sentner, Irie (November 13, 2024). "Trump names 4 top campaign advisers to senior White House roles". Politico.
- Shear, Michael; Haberman, Maggie (December 22, 2016). "Trump Rewards Kellyanne Conway With a Top White House Staff Slot". The New York Times.
- Shear, Michael; Haberman, Maggie; Confessore, Nicholas; Yourish, Karen; Buchanan, Larry; Collins, Keith (November 2, 2019). "How Trump Reshaped the Presidency in Over 11,000 Tweets". The New York Times.
- Shear, Michael (January 22, 2017). "One President With Two Very Different Twitter Voices". The New York Times.
- Sherman, Jake; Palmer, Anna; Lippman, Daniel (January 18, 2019). "Christie on Kushner, and how Pelosi can torture Trump". Politico.
- Stokols, Eli (July 20, 2016). "Who is running Trump's campaign?". Politico.
- Thrush, Glenn; Nelson, Louis (November 11, 2016). "Pence to take over Trump's transition effort from Christie". Politico.
- Thrush, Glenn; Haberman, Maggie; Goldman, Adam; Feuer, Alan (September 12, 2022). "Justice Dept. Issues 40 Subpoenas in a Week, Expanding Its Jan. 6 Inquiry". The New York Times.
- "Trump National". The Journal News. April 23, 2006.
- Wu, Nicholas; Cheney, Kyle (April 6, 2022). "House votes to hold Dan Scavino and Peter Navarro in contempt". Politico.
- "Yorktown High". The Citizen Register. May 27, 1994.
- Zhuang, Yan (October 12, 2025). "Trump Announces Longtime Aide Dan Scavino as Head of Personnel". The New York Times.

Political offices
Preceded by Bill Shine	White House Deputy Chief of Staff for Communications; 2020–2021	Vacant Title next held by Taylor Budowich; 2025 as White House Deputy Chief of Staff for Communications and Personnel
