= Young Artists After Siamesas 1960 =

Painting by American artist Kehinde Wiley

Young Artists After Siamesas 1960 is a painting by American artist Kehinde Wiley commissioned by the federal government in 2013. It depicts four artists from the Dominican Republic against Wiley's signature highly-decorative background. In August 2026, the painting became the subject of controversy when it was removed from the walls of the U.S. Embassy in the Dominican Republic by Erin Scavino, the head of the Art in Embassies program at the U.S. Department of State.
