= May 2025 visit by Donald Trump to the Middle East =

- Part of second presidency of Donald Trump, International presidential trips made by Donald Trump
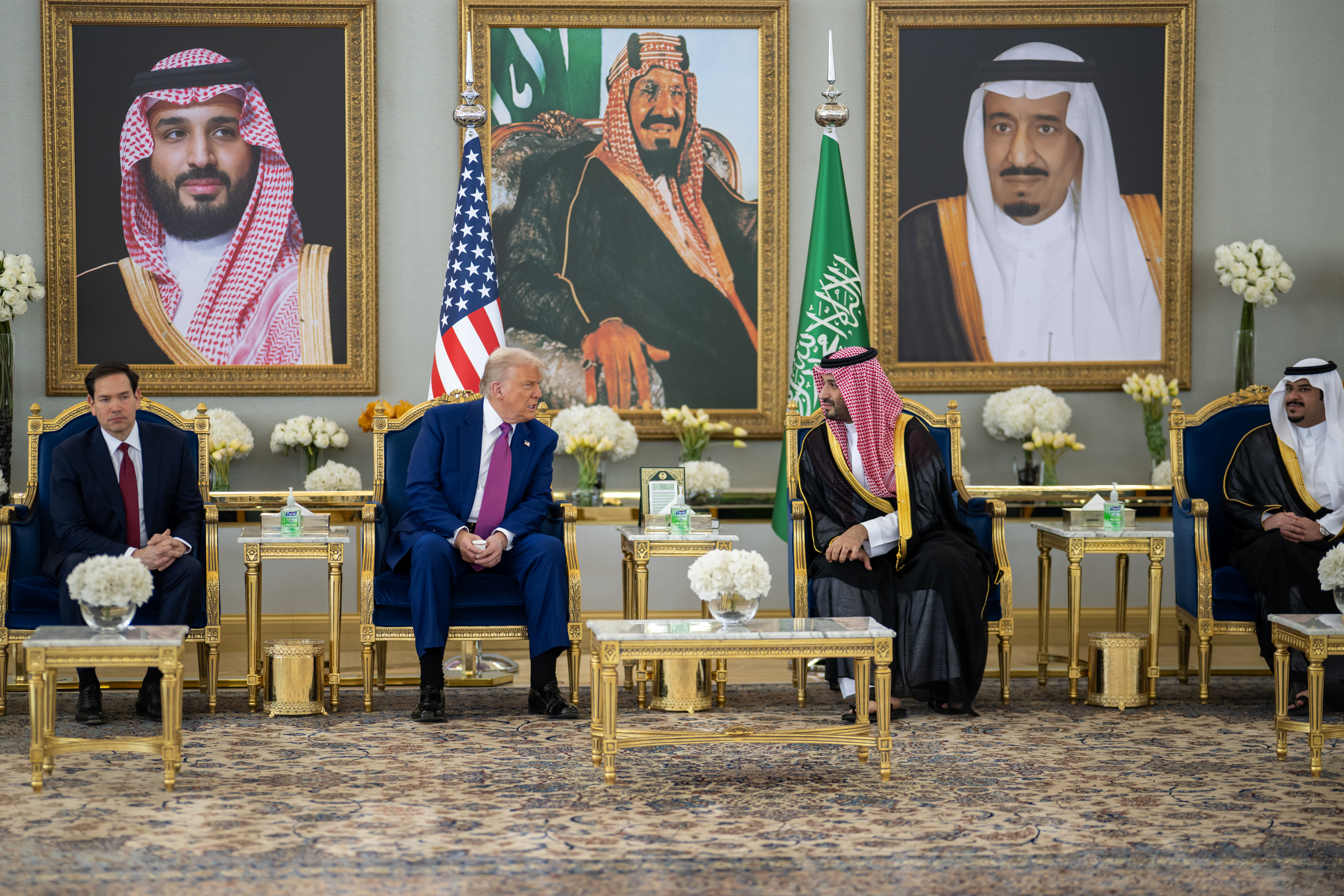
- Trump with Mohammed bin Salman in the Al Yamamah Palace
- Date: May 13–16, 2025
- Location: Saudi Arabia; Qatar; United Arab Emirates (Note: Trump briefly landed in the United Kingdom for a refueling stop.)

From 13 to 16 May 2025, the president of the United States, Donald Trump, undertook his first major international trip of his second term, visiting Saudi Arabia, Qatar, and the United Arab Emirates. Trump was joined by a Republican delegation and several business executives, including senior advisor Elon Musk. The four-day tour primarily focused on securing business deals and investments in the United States, which Trump claimed could reach as high as $4 trillion, as well as lifting sanctions on the transitional government of Syria.

== Background ==
=== Planning ===
In April 2025, Karoline Leavitt, the White House press secretary, announced that President Donald Trump would visit Saudi Arabia, Qatar, and the United Arab Emirates in May, his second foreign trip of his second term after the funeral of Pope Francis. The visit notably excluded Israel, though Steve Witkoff, Trump's Middle East envoy, met with Edan Alexander, a hostage who was released on May 12 in a deal between the United States and Hamas. Trump later denied that Israel was deliberately excluded from the visit. The following month, Axios reported that a Gulf Cooperation Council summit would be held during the visit.

Newswires were excluded from traveling on Air Force One; the White House Correspondents' Association formally objected to the move.

=== Negotiations ===
Leading up to the visit, the Trump administration set out to resolve the aftermath of the fall of the Assad regime, the Gaza war hostage crisis, the Russo-Ukrainian war, and Iran's nuclear program. The administration intended to sign agreements on minerals and semiconductors. Trump additionally proposed moving to have the Geographic Names Information System refer to the Persian Gulf as the "Arabian Gulf", increasing tensions with Iran by reviving the Persian Gulf naming dispute, though plans to rename the gulf were later abandoned over Iranian opposition, according to CNN.

== Visit ==
=== Saudi Arabia (May 13–14) ===
Trump in the arrival ceremony in Riyadh, Saudi Arabia, 2025

On May 12, Trump temporarily stopped at RAF Mildenhall in Suffolk to refuel before going to Riyadh. As he traveled to Saudi Arabia, he was interviewed by Sean Hannity of Fox News. Trump met with Crown Prince Mohammed bin Salman the following day, where he repeated his calls to increase Saudi Arabia's investment in the United States from US$600 billion to US$1 trillion; the figure is approximately equal to Saudi Arabia's gross domestic product for a year and exceeds the Public Investment Fund's assets. Trump and Mohammed signed a "strategic economic partnership" agreement that includes a US$142 billion letter of intent to improve defense capabilities, a memorandum of understanding with the United States Department of Justice and on energy resources, cooperations on diseases, and agreements between the Saudi Space Agency and NASA and between the government of Saudi Arabia and the National Zoological Park to establish a dedicated exhibit for the Arabian leopard. The visit elevated Mohammed's standing within the Saudi government as King Salman, who did not appear during the Saudi visit, has largely receded from public view. In contrast to the 2017 Riyadh summit—when King Salman greeted Trump at King Khalid International Airport—Mohammed now handles such welcomes.

Trump's visit coincided with the Saudi-U.S. Investment Forum, an event that included the chief executives of Blackstone, Citigroup, and Palantir Technologies. During the forum, Nvidia and AMD announced that they would provide semiconductors to Humain, a Saudi artificial intelligence company, in a US$10 billion project. Elon Musk, an advisor to Trump, stated that the Saudi government had approved plans to use Starlink for aviation and maritime shipping and that he had shown Optimus robots to Trump and Mohammed. Speaking at the forum, Trump encouraged Saudi Arabia to join the Abraham Accords—drawing silence from the audience—announced that he would lift sanctions on Syria, and implored Iran to negotiate over its nuclear program. Trump notably emphasized that "there could be no sharper contrast" between the constructive path being followed on the Arabian Peninsula and the "disaster unfolding" across the Gulf in Iran, noting how he intended to rename the Persian Gulf to the "Arabian Gulf". DataVolt, a Saudi company, committed to invest US$20 billion into U.S. energy infrastructure and data centers; in turn, American firms invested US$2 billion into Saudi projects, including King Salman International Airport, King Salman Park, and Qiddiya City. The announced deals amounted to approximately US$283 billion in investments. Trump attended a state dinner in Diriyah after speaking at the Saudi-U.S. Investment Forum.

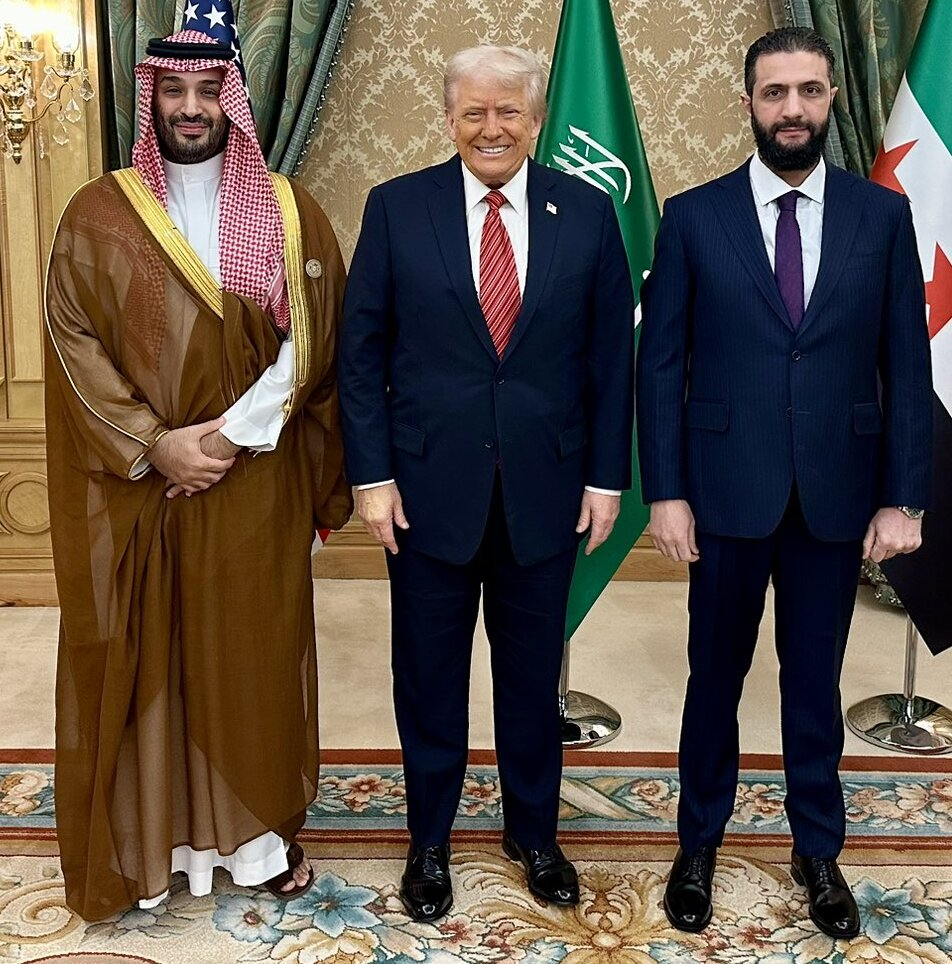
Trump with Crown Prince of Saudi Arabia Mohammed bin Salman and President of Syria Ahmed al-Sharaa in Riyadh, 2025

Prior to going to Doha, Trump met with Syrian president Ahmed al-Sharaa, the first time that the leaders had met since a meeting was convened between Bill Clinton and Hafez al-Assad in Geneva in 2000, and urged him to join the Abraham Accords. Mohammed bin Salman and Turkish president Recep Tayyip Erdoğan took part in the meeting. Trump attended a Gulf Cooperation Council summit with Tamim bin Hamad Al Thani of Qatar, Mishal Al-Ahmad Al-Jaber Al-Sabah of Kuwait, Hamad bin Isa Al Khalifa of Bahrain. Oman and the United Arab Emirates sent representatives, Asa'ad bin Tariq Al Said and Khaled bin Mohamed Al Nahyan respectively. In his opening remarks, Mohammed advocated for a conclusion to the Gaza war that would lead to the goals set forth in the Arab Peace Initiative.

=== Qatar (May 14–15) ===
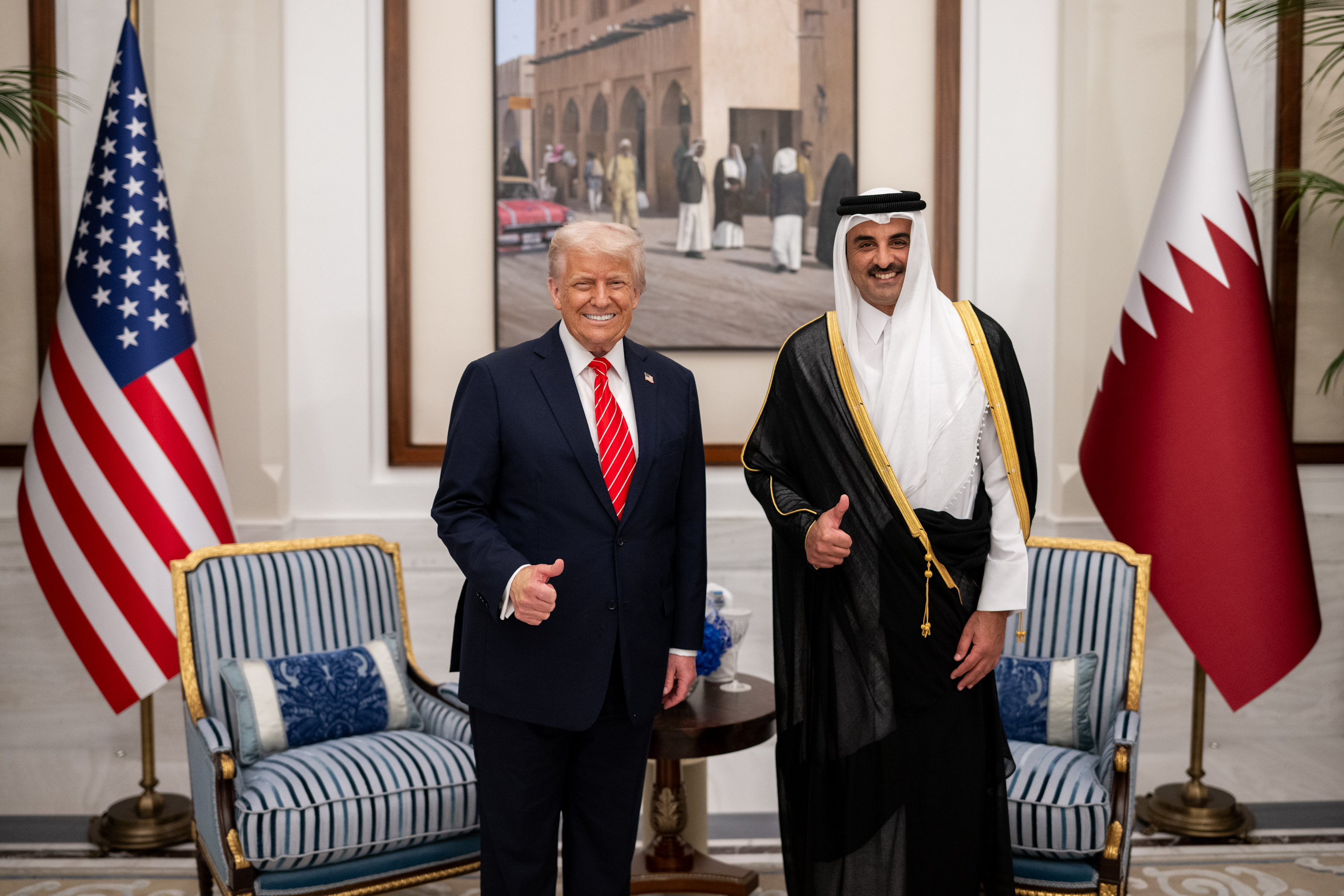
Trump and Qatar's Emir Tamim bin Hamad Al Thani in Lusail, Qatar, 2025

Trump arrived in Doha on May 14, where he met with Tamim bin Hamad Al Thani. Hours later, Qatar Airways signed an agreement to purchase as many as 210 planes from Boeing, in what Trump described as "the largest order of jets in the history of Boeing". The United States announced over US$243 billion in deals with Qatar, including a US$1 billion defense agreement with Raytheon for Qatari counter-drone capabilities, a US$2 billion contract with General Atomics for MQ-9B unmanned aerial vehicles, and US$38 billion for Al Udeid Air Base. Trump later attended a state dinner at Lusail Palace where he appealed to Qatar to improve Iran–United States relations. After the dinner, Trump and Tamim gathered for a ceremony passing the hosting duties of the FIFA World Cup to the United States. The following day, he participated in a business roundtable at St. Regis Doha and visited Al Udeid Air Base.

=== United Arab Emirates (May 15–16) ===
Trump arrived in Abu Dhabi on May 15, becoming the second serving U.S. president to visit the country. He toured the Sheikh Zayed Grand Mosque with Khaled bin Mohamed Al Nahyan. The United Arab Emirates awarded Trump the Order of Zayed, the country's highest civil decoration. During the visit, the United States Department of Commerce announced a deal with the Emirates and Emirati artificial intelligence firm G42 to establish the largest data center for artificial intelligence outside of the United States in Abu Dhabi. Trump attended a business event and visited the Abrahamic Family House the following day before returning to the United States.

On May 16, Trump acknowledged the famine in the Gaza Strip and promised to address the situation.

== Impact ==
Trump's visit to Saudi Arabia marked a "significant shift in U.S. foreign policy in the Middle East" in which the U.S. has no enemies, according to The Washington Post. The New York Times noted that Trump's pledge to no longer give "lectures on how to live" to the Middle East denounced decades of U.S. foreign policy in the region. His visit to Qatar was also viewed amid changes to the country's global reputation, including hosting the 2022 FIFA World Cup.

Trump's decision to lift sanctions from Syria was seen as critical to rebuilding the country.

== Responses ==
=== Ethics concerns ===
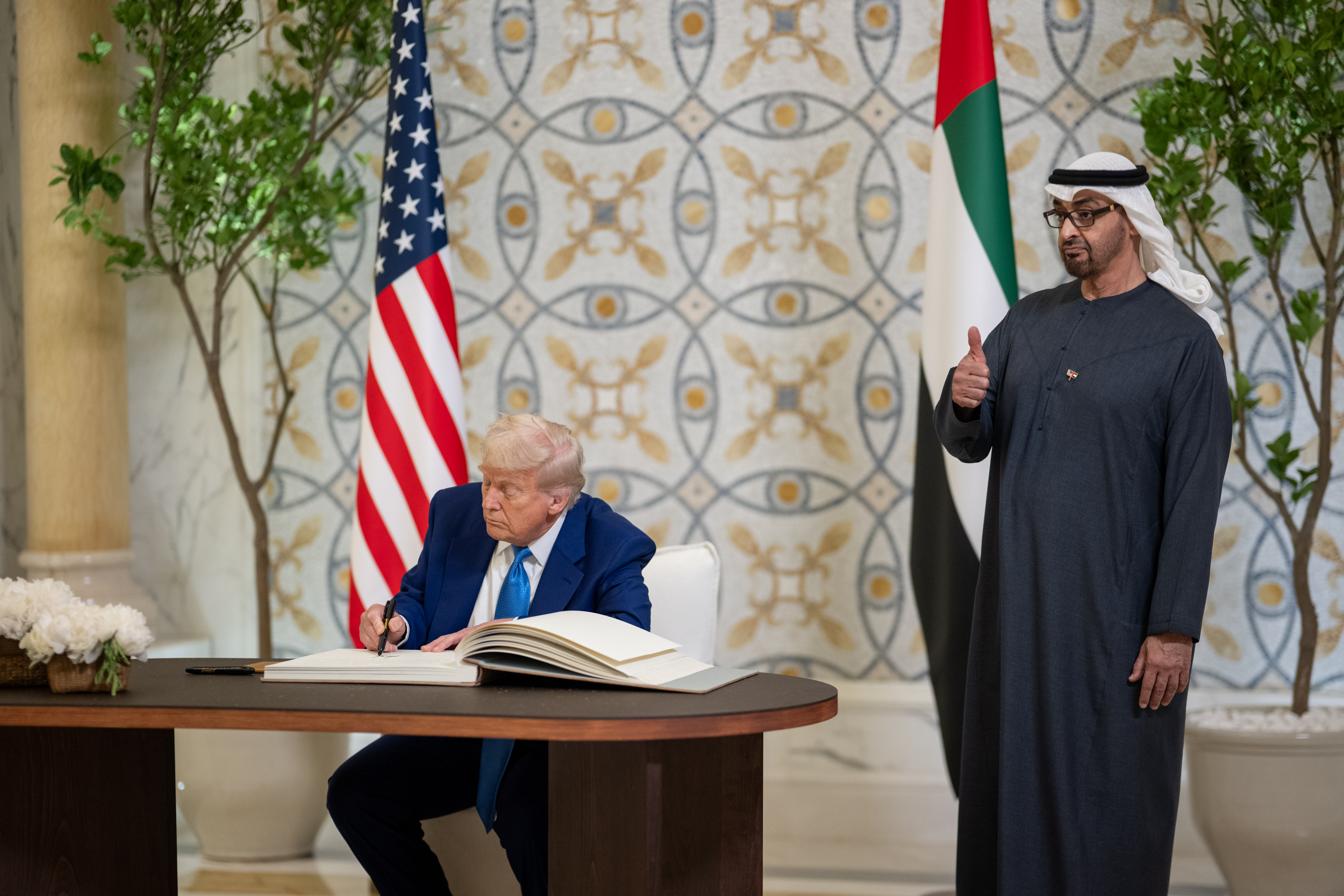
Trump and UAE President Mohamed bin Zayed Al Nahyan in Abu Dhabi, 2025

The visit came amid business deals with the Trump family, including Trump-branded residential towers in Dubai and in Jeddah, a Trump-branded golf resort in Qatar, a deal between MGX Fund Management Limited and World Liberty Financial, and investments by the Public Investment Fund in Jared Kushner's ventures. On May 11, ABC News reported that Trump intended to accept a Boeing 747-8KB from the House of Thani, a move that posed ethical issues. Republicans expressed national security concerns over the plane.

=== Geopolitical response ===
The 2025 negotiations between the United States and Iran and Trump's lighter tone on Iran were praised by Bahrain's Hamad bin Isa Al Khalifa; following an attack on Saudi diplomatic missions in Iran in 2016, Bahrain severed diplomatic relations with Iran, though it has attempted to restore them. Iranian Supreme Leader Ali Khamenei condemned Trump's critical remarks about Iran during the visit, referring to him as a liar. The New York Times's Farnaz Fassihi noted that the visit accentuated the belief that Iran has been economically held back.

Celebrations in Syria were held following Trump's announcement that he would lift sanctions on the country.

=== Business deals ===
The United States House Select Committee on Strategic Competition between the United States and the Chinese Communist Party criticized a planned agreement to sell semiconductors to countries in the Middle East, viewing it as a potential vulnerability for China to leverage.

== Works cited ==
- Al-Rashdan, Leen; Johnsson, Julie (May 14, 2025). "Boeing Enjoys Comeback Moment From Crisis With Record Qatar Deal". Bloomberg News.
- Broadwater, Luke (May 13, 2025). "Trump again encouraged Saudi Arabia to increase its investment in the United States beyond the $600 billion over four years already pledged by Crown Prince Mohammed bin Salman". The New York Times.
- Broadwater, Luke (May 13, 2025). "To applause in the royal court, Trump and Crown Prince Mohammed bin Salman signed an agreement of "strategic economic partnership."". The New York Times.
- Broadwater, Luke; Nereim, Vivian; Swan, Jonathan (May 13, 2025). "Money Talks (and Listens) at Saudi Investment Forum Attended by Trump". The New York Times.
- Broadwater, Luke (May 14, 2025). "Qatar Airways signed a deal today to buy what President Trump said were 160 Boeing jets, the latest deal signed during his four-day visit to the Arabian Peninsula". The New York Times.
- Broadwater, Luke; Swan, Jonathan (May 14, 2025). "Qatar Airways to Buy 210 Boeing Jets". The New York Times.
- Broadwater, Luke (May 15, 2025). "It's 93 degrees and sunny here in Doha as President Trump gets ready to participate in a business roundtable at the St. Regis, a five-star hotel with a private beach area, an outdoor swimming pool and tennis courts". The New York Times.
- Broadwater, Luke (May 15, 2025). "The U.A.E. awarded President Trump the Order of Zayed, the country's highest civil decoration". The New York Times.
- Brown, Eliot; Kalin, Stephen (May 12, 2025). "Trump's Family Is Rapidly Striking Business Deals in the Mideast". The New York Times.
- Cheeseman, Abbie (May 14, 2025). "Trump urges Syria to join Abraham Accords after lifting sanctions". The Washington Post.
- Dagher, Sam (May 11, 2025). "After Driving Down Oil, Saudi Arabia's MBS Looks for Trump Dividend". Bloomberg News.
- "Donald Trump lands at UK air base to refuel". BBC News. May 12, 2025.
- Dwoskin, Elizabeth (May 13, 2025). "U.S. hopes to strike deals on minerals, chips during Trump's Mideast trip". The Washington Post.
- El Chmouri, Omar; King, Omar (May 13, 2025). "Nvidia, AMD Sell Chips to Saudi Arabia for AI Data Centers". Bloomberg News.
- El Chmouri, Omar; Al-Rashdan, Leen (May 13, 2025). "Musk Strikes Starlink Deal With Saudi Arabia During Trump Visit". Bloomberg News.
- Fassihi, Farnaz (May 11, 2025). "Can Trump Rename the Persian Gulf?". The New York Times.
- Fassihi, Farnaz (May 17, 2025). "'A Slap in the Face': Iranians Watched Trump's Mideast Tour With Envy". The New York Times.
- Friedman, Amanda (April 22, 2025). "Trump to visit Saudi Arabia, Qatar and UAE in May". Politico.
- George, Susannah (May 13, 2025). "Trump implores Iran to make deal over nuclear program". The Washington Post.
- George, Susannah (May 14, 2025). "Trump meeting was first in 25 years between U.S. and Syrian presidents". The Washington Post.
- Grynbaum, Michael (May 12, 2025). "The White House Correspondents' Association on Monday formally objected to the Trump administration's decision to exclude any newswire reporters from traveling on Air Force One during President Trump's visit to the Middle East". The New York Times.
- Haberman, Maggie; Schmitt, Eric; Thrush, Glenn (May 11, 2025). "Trump Is Poised to Accept a Luxury 747 From Qatar for Use as Air Force One". The New York Times.
- Hubbard, Ben (May 14, 2025). "Syrians Are Elated and Optimistic as Trump Vows to Lift Sanctions". The New York Times.
- Keller-Lynn, Carrie (May 13, 2025). "Trump Surprised and Sidelined Israel Ahead of Landmark Middle East Trip". The Wall Street Journal.
- Loveluck, Louisa; Zakaria, Zakaria (May 14, 2025). "Syrians rejoice after Trump pledge to lift crippling sanctions". The Washington Post.
- Naar, Ismaeel (May 13, 2025). "Saudi Arabia's King Salman has been absent so far from Trump state visit". The New York Times.
- Naar, Ismaeel (May 14, 2025). "King Hamad bin Isa Al Khalifa of Bahrain praised the continuing talks between the United States and Iran, saying the negotiations would "bolster stability and improve prosperity across the region."". The New York Times.
- Naar, Ismaeel; Liston, Enjoli (May 14, 2025). "Trump Meets Militant Who Now Leads Syria". The New York Times.
- Naar, Ismaeel (May 14, 2025). "Trump met with the emir of Qatar, who told him that he had known him for many years and knew he was a "man of peace."". The New York Times.
- Naar, Ismaeel (May 15, 2025). "After another fighter-jet escort, President Trump has touched down in Abu Dhabi, becoming only the second serving American president to visit the United Arab Emirates". The New York Times.
- Naar, Ismaeel (May 15, 2025). "President Trump is touring the Sheikh Zayed Grand Mosque, one of the largest mosques in the world, which attracts millions of visitors each year". The New York Times.
- Nauman, Qasim (May 16, 2025). "Trump Wraps Up a Middle East Tour Full of Lavish Receptions and Business Deals". The New York Times.
- Nereim, Vivian; Lipton, Eric (April 30, 2025). "New Mideast Project Is Latest Trump Company Deal Tied to a Foreign Government". The New York Times.
- Nereim, Vivian (May 12, 2025). "Trump Wants Saudi Arabia to Invest Its Money in the U.S. All of It". The New York Times.
- Nereim, Vivian (May 13, 2025). "A Trump visit is the right moment for a U.S.-Saudi business frenzy". The New York Times.
- Nereim, Vivian (May 13, 2025). "There was silence from the crowd as Trump said that it was his "fervent wish" that Saudi Arabia "will soon be joining the Abraham Accords," a 2020 agreement in which two of the kingdom's neighbors, the U.A.E. and Bahrain, established diplomatic relations with Israel". The New York Times.
- Nereim, Vivian (May 14, 2025). "Only three Gulf leaders have traveled to Riyadh to attend the summit with Trump: Sheikh Tamim bin Hamad al-Thani of Qatar, Sheikh Mishal Al Ahmed Al Sabah of Kuwait and King Hamad bin Isa Al Khalifa of Bahrain". The New York Times.
- Nereim, Vivian (May 14, 2025). "Crown Prince Mohammed bin Salman of Saudi Arabia said in opening remarks at the summit that the kingdom hoped for de-escalation across the region, including an end to the war in Gaza, with a "sustainable solution to the Palestinian cause" in line with the Arab Peace Initiative, which predicated diplomatic relations with Israel on the creation of a Palestinian state". The New York Times.
- Nereim, Vivian (May 14, 2025). "Trump's Pledge to the Middle East: No More 'Lectures on How to Live'". The New York Times.
- Ravid, Barak (May 3, 2025). "Scoop: Trump to hold summit with Gulf leaders during Saudi Arabia trip". Axios.
- Ravid, Barak; Basu, Zachary (May 14, 2025). "Trump tries to tackle four global crises all at once". Axios.
- Shahla, Arsalan (May 17, 2025). "Iran's Khamenei Brands Trump a Liar in Escalation of Rhetoric". Bloomberg News.
- Shear, Michael; Rasgon, Adam; Panja, Tariq (May 14, 2025). "With Trump Visit, Qatar's Image Makeover Scores Another Success". The New York Times.
- Svitek, Patrick (May 14, 2025). "Trump appeals to Qatar for help with Iran tensions". The Washington Post.
- Swan, Jonathan; Hubbard, Ben (May 13, 2025). "Trump will lift sanctions on Syria, meet with new president". The New York Times.
- Swanson, Ana (May 13, 2025). "As Trump begins his Gulf trip in Saudi Arabia, his plan to sign agreements that would sell large numbers of American-designed A.I. chips to countries in the Middle East is getting some blowback in Congress". The New York Times.
- Swanson, Ana (May 15, 2025). "The Trump administration just announced that it is working with the United Arab Emirates to establish the largest A.I. data center outside of the United States". The New York Times.
- Tucker, Brianna (May 13, 2025). "Sean Hannity interviewed President Donald Trump en route to Saudi Arabia, and that conversation will air on the Fox News host's show Tuesday at 9 p.m. Eastern time". The Washington Post.
- Tucker, Brianna (May 14, 2025). "Qatari leader holds ceremony to pass World Cup to Trump, U.S." The Washington Post.
- Vazquez, Maegan (May 13, 2025). "President Donald Trump arrived at a Saudi state dinner on Tuesday evening, according to the White House press pool". The Washington Post.
- Viser, Matt; Birnbaum, Michael (May 13, 2025). "Trump pulls sanctions on Syria, extends olive branch to Iran". The Washington Post.
- Wang, Amy; Viser, Matt (May 14, 2025). "President Donald Trump denied that his trip to the Middle East this week — which includes stops in Saudi Arabia, Qatar and the United Arab Emirates — snubs Israel". The Washington Post.
- Wang, Amy; Viser, Matt (May 14, 2025). "President Donald Trump has arrived at Lusail Palace for a state dinner hosted by Qatar". The Washington Post.
- Wise, Lindsay; Linskey, Annie (May 13, 2025). "Republicans Raise Concerns Over Trump's Plane Gift as He Heads to Qatar". The Wall Street Journal.
- Waldenberg, Samantha (May 13, 2025). "Trump says "disaster" is unfolding in Persian Gulf before recalling "they wanted" to name it "Gulf of Iran"". CNN.
- Yaffe-Bellany, David (May 1, 2025). "At a Dubai Conference, Trump's Conflicts Take Center Stage". The New York Times.
- Zhuang, Yan (May 15, 2025). "On Gulf Tour, Trump Visits U.S. Base in Mideast". The New York Times.
