= Rob Thomson (executive) =

American businessman (born 1962)

- Born: Rob Thomson; 1962 (age 63–64); Buffalo, New York, United States
- Occupations: Business executive, realtor, philanthropist
- Notable work: Waterfront Properties, Waterfront Yacht Brokerage
- Website: robthomson.com

Rob Thomson is an American business executive, realtor, and philanthropist based in Jupiter, Florida. He is the founder and managing partner of both Waterfront Properties, and Club Communities and Waterfront Yacht Brokerage. He is also the vice president of the Big Dog Ranch Rescue.

== Early life ==
Born in Buffalo, New York Thomson moved to Jupiter, Florida, in 1962, where he built a real estate business. His mother was a realtor, and he learned the art of selling homes from her.

== Career ==
In 1988, Thomson founded the Waterfront Properties and Club Communities. The company has five offices, including locations in Delray, Stuart, and Palm Beach, Florida.

In 2015, Thomson co-founded a yacht brokerage called Waterfront Yacht Brokerage with Joe Kelly, which also provides insurance and financing.

By the end of 2018, Thomson achieved nearly $200 million in sales in the Jupiter/Tequesta/North County region, bringing his career total to over $2 billion.

Over the years, as a realtor, Thomson has represented buyers and sellers in transactions that involved Rick Rieder of BlackRock, Donald Trump Jr., Johnny Gray, and Dustin Johnson. He is also the youngest member of Luxury Real Estate's Billionaires Club.

== Philanthropy ==
Thomson has contributed to various charitable organizations, including the Juvenile Diabetes Research Foundation, the American Cancer Society, and the Loggerhead Marinelife Center. He also served on the board of directors for the Hanley Foundation.

Thomson established Charities for Children, which has distributed toys in Palm Beach and Martin counties. He also founded the Waterfront Way Foundation to assist underprivileged families.

Following the disappearance of two local boys at sea, Thomson created the "Find Austin & Perry" Facebook group to support search efforts. He also manages a Facebook group called "Jupiter These Days," which focuses on local events and attractions in Jupiter.

In 2020, Thomson organized a fundraising effort for a new bus for Jupiter High School, and collected $107,000 from private donations.

Every Christmas Eve, Thomson donates bicycles to children from low-income backgrounds in Riviera Beach, Florida. The family selection is facilitated by Bishop at The New Macedonia Missionary Baptist Church.

== Recognition ==
In 2011, Thomson was awarded the Best Industry Networking Award by Who's Who in Luxury Real Estate. The recognition is based on industry engagement and social networking. That year, Thomson secured over $120 million in real estate sales, with an additional $20 million pending.

In 2023, Thomson was named as the Humanitarian of the Year by the Florida Association of Realtors.
