= Annie Karni =

American journalist (born 1983)

- Born: October 18, 1983 (age 42); Baltimore, Maryland, U.S.
- Education: Haverford College (BA English) (Park School of Baltimore)
- Occupation: Journalist
- Years active: 2005–present
- Employer: The New York Times
- Spouse: Ted Mann (m. 2015–2025)
- Relatives: Edi Karni (father); Barbara S. Karni (mother)

Annie Karni (born October 18, 1983) is an American journalist and author who is a White House correspondent for The New York Times. She is the co-author of the book “Mad House: How Donald Trump, MAGA Mean Girls, a Former Used Car Salesman, a Florida Nepo Baby, and a Man with Rats in His Walls Broke Congress,” which she co-wrote with journalist Luke Broadwater. Karni is also a contributor on MSNOW.

== Education ==
Karni attended the Park School of Baltimore before receiving a B.A. in English from Haverford College in 2004.

== Career ==
Karni began her career as a reporter at The New York Sun in 2005 where she stayed until she moved to The New York Post in 2008. Karni spent a year writing for Crain's before she was appointed political reporter for the New York Daily News. In total, at the New York tabloids, she spent a decade covering the City Hall and local news.

She first entered the national sphere when she joined Politico as a politics reporter in 2015. Karni joined The New York Times as a White House correspondent in 2018 after the departure of Julie Hirschfeld Davis, who had changed beat to report on Congress. Karni often embeds a feminist perspective in her reporting. She has appeared on PBS' Washington Week as a political analyst.

== Personal life ==
Karni was born in Baltimore, Maryland, to Barbara S. Karni and Edi Karni. Her father is an Israeli-born economist and decision theorist.

From 2015 to 2025, Karni was married to Ted Mann, a reporter for The Wall Street Journal.
