= The Apprentice (American TV series) season 3 =

The Apprentice
- Season 3
- No. of contestants: 18
- Winner: Kendra Todd
- Runner-up: Tana Goertz
- No. of episodes: 17

Release
- Original network: NBC
- Original release: January 20 – May 19, 2005

Additional information
- Filming dates: October 2004 – November 2004

Season chronology
- ← Previous; Season 2 Next → Season 4

The Apprentice 3 is the third season of The Apprentice. It premiered January 20, 2005 on NBC. This was the last season to land in the Top 20 Nielsen ratings, ranking at #15, with an average of 13.96 million viewers.

== Season changes ==
In this season, two groups of nine were divided into book smarts (who took the name Magna Corp) and street smarts (called Net Worth) referring to those with and without a completed college education. This replaced the Battle of the Sexes concept used on The Apprentice 1 and The Apprentice 2.

Trump continued the twist introduced in the previous season that allowed the winning project manager to be exempt from firing should their team lose the next task. However, he discontinued the Season 2 option that allowed the losing project manager to bring three people into the boardroom as opposed to two, after it was only used twice during the season. Trump did make one exception to this rule and allowed Audrey to bring three people into the Boardroom when she lost a challenge, but she ended up being fired anyway.

== Candidates ==
The Net Worth team contained four men and five women, and the Magna Corp team contained five men and four women. Trump stated that "You just have to be business-smart", no matter what kind of smarts you have. See the candidates page for specific details on the candidates. Trump also pointed out one other major difference between the two groups – those with only a high school diploma earn three times as much as the college grads. Stephanie suggested Magna for the team name. It was short for magna cum laude, which means "with great distinction" and is often used as a title for high achieving graduates. Tara suggested Net Worth.

Book Smarts	Street Smarts
Magna	Net Worth

Candidate	Background	Original team	Age	Hometown	Result
Kendra Todd	Real estate broker	Magna	25	Boynton Beach, Florida	Hired by Trump (5–19–2005)
Tana Goertz	Sales executive	Net Worth	37	Des Moines, Iowa	Fired in the season finale (5–19–2005)
Craig Williams	Shoeshine business owner	Net Worth	37	Conley, Georgia	Fired in week 15 (5–5–2005)
Alex Thomason	Attorney	Magna	29	Brewster, Washington	Fired in week 14 (4–28–2005)
Bren Olswanger	Prosecutor	Magna	32	Memphis, Tennessee	Fired in week 13 (4–21–2005)
Chris Shelton	Real estate investor	Net Worth	21	Las Vegas, Nevada	Fired in week 12 (4–14–2005)
Angie McKnight	Gym franchise owner	Net Worth	41	Lake Balboa, California	Fired in week 11 (4–7–2005)
Stephanie Myers	Supply chain consultant	Magna	29	San Diego, California	Fired in week 10 (3–31–2005)
Erin Elmore	Attorney	Magna	26	Philadelphia, Pennsylvania	Fired in week 9 (3–24–2005)
John Gafford	Technology firm owner	Net Worth	32	Tampa, Florida	Fired in week 8 (3–10–2005)
Audrey Evans	Real estate agent	Net Worth	22	Salt Lake City, Utah	Fired in week 7 (3–3–2005)
Tara Dowdell	Senior governor manager	Net Worth	28	New York City, New York	Fired in week 6 (2–24–2005)
Michael Tarshi	Real estate developer	Magna	25	Boston, Massachusetts	Fired in week 5 (2–17–2005)
Kristen Kirchner	Real estate financier	Net Worth	31	Los Angeles, California	Fired in week 4 (2–10–2005)
Danny Kastner	Marketing technology firm owner	Magna	39	Boston, Massachusetts	Fired in week 3 (2–3–2005)
Verna Felton	Business manager	Magna	31	Seattle, Washington	Quit in week 3 (2–3–2005)
Brian McDowell	Real estate broker	Net Worth	29	Wildwood, New Jersey	Fired in week 2 (1–27–2005)
Todd Everett	Sales manager	Magna	34	Carlsbad, California	Fired in week 1 (1–20–2005)

== Weekly results ==
Candidate	Original team	Week 8 team	Week 10 team	Week 12 team	Week 14 team	Final Task Team	Application result	Record as project manager
Kendra Todd	Magna	Magna	Magna	Magna	Magna	Magna	Hired by Trump	3–0 (win in weeks 8, 12, & 14)
Tana Goertz	Net Worth	Magna	Magna	Magna	Net Worth	Net Worth	Fired in the Season Finale	2–1 (win in weeks 5 & 11, loss in week 14)
Craig Williams	Net Worth	Magna	Magna	Magna	Magna		Fired in week 15	2–0 (win in weeks 9 & 13)
Alex Thomason	Magna	Magna	Net Worth	Net Worth	Net Worth		Fired in week 14	1–2 (win in week 6, loss in weeks 11 & 13)
Bren Olswanger	Magna	Magna	Magna	Net Worth			Fired in week 13	1–1 (win in week 10, loss in week 5)
Chris Shelton	Net Worth	Net Worth	Net Worth	Net Worth		Net Worth	Fired in week 12	0–2 (loss in weeks 8 & 12)
Angie McKnight	Net Worth	Net Worth	Net Worth				Fired in week 11	1–1 (win in week 3, loss in week 9)
Stephanie Myers	Magna	Net Worth	Net Worth				Fired in week 10	1–1 (win in week 7, loss in week 10)
Erin Elmore	Magna	Net Worth				Magna	Fired in week 9	0–1 (loss in week 4)
John Gafford	Net Worth	Net Worth					Fired in week 8	1–0 (win in week 1)
Audrey Evans	Net Worth						Fired in week 7	0–1 (loss in week 7)
Tara Dowdell	Net Worth						Fired in week 6	0–1 (loss in week 6)
Michael Tarshi	Magna					Magna	Fired in week 5	1–0 (win in week 2)
Kristen Kirchner	Net Worth					Net Worth	Fired in week 4	0–1 (loss in week 4)
Danny Kastner	Magna					Magna	Fired in week 3	0–1 (loss in week 3)
Verna Felton	Magna						Quit in week 3	
Brian McDowell	Net Worth					Net Worth	Fired in week 2	0–1 (loss in week 2)
Todd Everett	Magna						Fired in week 1	0–1 (loss in week 1)

Elimination chart
No.	Candidate	1	2	3	4	5	6	7	8	9	10	11	12	13	14	15	16
1	Kendra	IN	IN	IN	IN	IN	IN	IN	WIN	IN	IN	IN	WIN	IN	WIN	ADV	HIRED
2	Tana	IN	IN	IN	BR	WIN	IN	IN	IN	IN	IN	WIN	IN	IN	LOSE	ADV	FIRED
3	Craig	IN	IN	IN	IN	IN	BR	BR	IN	WIN	IN	IN	IN	WIN	IN	FIRED	
4	Alex	BR	IN	IN	IN	IN	WIN	IN	IN	IN	BR	LOSE	BR	LOSE	FIRED		
5	Bren	IN	IN	IN	BR	LOSE	IN	IN	IN	IN	WIN	IN	BR	FIRED			
6	Chris	IN	IN	IN	IN	IN	IN	IN	LOSE	BR	BR	BR	FIRED				
7	Angie	IN	IN	WIN	IN	IN	IN	BR	IN	LOSE	IN	FIRED					
8	Stephanie	IN	IN	BR	IN	BR	IN	WIN	IN	IN	FIRED						
9	Erin	IN	IN	IN	LOSE	IN	IN	IN	BR	FIRED							
10	John	WIN	IN	IN	IN	IN	IN	BR	FIRED								
11	Audrey	IN	IN	IN	BR	IN	BR	FIRED									
12	Tara	IN	IN	IN	IN	IN	FIRED										
13	Michael	IN	WIN	BR	BR	FIRED											
14	Kristen	IN	IN	IN	FIRED												
15	Danny	BR	IN	FIRED													
16	Verna	IN	IN	QUIT													
17	Brian	IN	FIRED														
18	Todd	FIRED															

The candidate was on the losing team.
The candidate was hired and won the competition.
The candidate won as project manager on his/her team.
The candidate lost as project manager on his/her team.
The candidate was brought to the final boardroom.
The candidate was fired.
The candidate lost as project manager and was fired.
The candidate quit the competition.

== Episodes ==
=== Week 1: Whopper 101 ===
- Airdate: January 20, 2005
- Hosting Company: Burger King
- Magna project manager: Todd
- Net Worth project manager: John
- Project: Both teams have to promote new hamburger product from Burger King and then sell it.
- Judges: Donald Trump; Carolyn Kepcher; George H. Ross
- Trump Monologue: Perseverance – The best people are the ones that don't stop until the sale is made, they never give up, they have "no quit".
- Results: Magna chosen Triple Cheese Angus Steak Burger while Net Worth chosen Western Angus Burger.
- Winning team: Net Worth
  - Reasons for Victory:The team of "street smarts" specifically picked a burger that they would be able to make an effective marketing campaign out of. They were able to incorporate a Western theme in their restaurant, along with a contest for two round-trip tickets to Las Vegas, that encouraged customers to buy their burger. Net Worth also had three cashiers and eight members trained for the restaurant, and were able to successfully upsell their burger. They sold 182 units of their specialty item for a total of $596.96.
  - Reward: Dinner with Trump at the famed Club 21 restaurant.
- Losing team: Magna
  - Reasons for loss: Magna had trained six people and only had two cashiers in their restaurant, which led to a bad point of sale and long lines. They also had an awful promotion scheme. They sold 139 units for a total of $553.22. Not only did they sell fewer units of their specialty burger, they ended up losing by $43.74.
- Sent to boardroom: Todd, Alex, Danny
  - Firing Verdict: Danny was singled out by nearly the entire team for handling their marketing strategies. Kendra was the only one to blame Todd for his inability to control Danny, which impressed Carolyn. Alex pointed out that he was responsible for only training two cashiers at the restaurant, which bothered Trump and his advisors.
- Fired: Todd Everett – for no leadership ability, being unable to control his team, performing poorly throughout the task including sitting away from the team the day before the selling event, and for making poor delegations. While Alex doomed the team by training only two cashiers and Danny was considered a loose cannon, Trump felt they were capable of being led and that Todd's lack of leadership was the primary reason they failed.
- Notes:
  - Trump was unimpressed that the college graduates were beaten by the high school graduates. He asked Magna if he wasted his time getting a college degree – Todd quickly assured him this was not the case.
  - This is the first time in Apprentice history where the losing project manager is the first to be fired.
  - Season 3 is the only season premiere where both project managers are the same sex. All other season premieres feature a man against a woman as project manager.
- Episode Recap on NBC.com

=== Week 2: Motel 666 ===
- Airdate: January 27, 2005
- Hosting Company: Yahoo!
- Magna project manager: Michael
- Net Worth project manager: Brian
- Project: Each team has a budget of $20,000 to renovate a motel on the Jersey Shore, then the teams must welcome the paying guests, who will rate the motel and the customer service they receive through Yahoo! Local site. The winner will be determined by highest rating.
- Judges: Donald Trump; Carolyn Kepcher; George H. Ross
- Trump Monologue: Respect Comes From Winning – Trump gives the example of Vince Lombardi and explains that the only reason he got away with the things he did was because he won (over the monologue Trump is shown playing golf with Annika Sörenstam).
- Winning team: Magna
  - Magna's score rating: 3.96
  - Reasons for victory: Magna's scores for the motel's rooms and facilities were only slightly better than Net Worth's, but Danny decided to throw a pool party, which created a good atmosphere among the guests and a fantastic customer service rating. Their plans for breakfast were nearly scuppered when Verna (who was supposed to be in charge of looking after the guests) abruptly left the motel, claiming that she was too stressed to continue in the process, but Carolyn chased after her and persuaded her to return, while Bren helped to salvage the breakfast situation.
  - Reward: An evening of dinner, drinks, and cigars with businessman Steve Forbes aboard his yacht.
- Losing team: Net Worth
  - Net Worth's score rating: 2.92
  - Reasons for loss: Brian's decision to spend almost the entire budget on renovating the bathrooms and building full-length wardrobes did not improve the ratings by as much as he had hoped, and the dirty rooms with bad carpeting decimated their overall rating. Even more damaging was the argument between Brian and Kristen right in front of the motel and their guests; while Angie and Audrey attempted to diffuse it, Kristen refused to calm down and started yapping at the women as well.
  - Sent to Boardroom: No final boardroom – Brian immediately admitted that the defeat was wholly his fault, and said that he should be fired.
  - Firing verdict:
    - Trump questioned other team members of Net Worth in order to determine whether Brian alone was at fault for the loss, and while several of them said that Kristen's attitude had exacerbated the problems, all agreed that Brian's decisions had doomed them from the start.
    - Brian nonetheless argued the points against Kristen, and also Chris's lack of contribution to the task despite his background in home renovation, until Trump reminded Brian that he had said he should be fired, implicitly asking whether he wanted to retract that statement and hold a final boardroom with Chris and Kristen.
    - Brian said that he was a fighter, but refused to withdraw his statement that he should be fired; after a confused Carolyn pointed out the contradiction in his words, Trump declared any further discussion a waste of time, before picking up the thread and telling Brian to "get lost".
  - Fired: Brian McDowell – for wasting money on many replacement toilets, the fact that no one liked him as a team leader, not having a set budget, being an incompetent and abrasive leader, and for saying that Trump should fire him. After Brian requested his termination, Trump said at that point that Brian was finished.
- Notes:
  - At the start of the boardroom, Trump told John that he was exempt from being fired, and then jokingly asked him if he'd like to waive his exemption, referencing former candidate Bradford Cohen's actions in the second episode of the previous season. John held onto the exemption however, noting that even if he didn't get himself instantly fired by doing that, he had argued with Brian several times during the task (though unlike Kristen, John stopped doing so after the guests arrived) and would have been one of his main targets were he not exempt.
  - While questioning other members of Net Worth, Angie told Chris that she was disappointed in how much he contributed to the task due to him previously boasting to the team about his experience in renovation, this caused Chris to lose his temper and yell at Angie that he did not have hands-on experience in renovation, which Angie did not find satisfactory and when questioned further by Trump, Angie said that Chris should be fired over Brian because she believed Brian had more leadership potential. This marks the first of several times that Chris loses his temper in the boardroom.
  - At one point during the boardroom session, Carolyn suggested to Brian to stop using expletives after Brian's repeated uses of the "F" word; Brian apologized, but added that he had simply been quoting what Kristen said to him during the task.
- Episode Recap on NBC.com

=== Week 3: Trouble is Brewing ===
- Airdate: February 3, 2005
- Quit: Verna Felton – From the second episode, it was noticeable that Verna had lost her motivation to continue on the show. Danny wanted the team to let her take the next task off so she could feel better, but no one on Magna supported this idea. After a meeting with her team, Verna simply opted to resign for unspecified personal reasons. This was the first time someone left The Apprentice on their own terms without being fired (Brian had effectively quit in the previous week by saying that he deserved to be fired, but Trump still fired him in the usual manner).
- Hosting Company: Nestlé
- Magna Project Manager: Danny
- Net Worth project manager: Angie
- Trump Monologue: Lead With Authority – A leader rarely leads with consensus; a leader has to be capable of thinking independently and often go against consensus.
- Project: Both teams were asked to promote Nestlé Nescafe brand. The winner will chosen and judged by Nescafe executives.
- Judges: Donald Trump; Carolyn Kepcher; George H. Ross
- Winning team: Net Worth
  - Reasons for victory: The team decided to build their campaign around a political debate theme (tying into the presidential election that was ongoing at the time of filming) based on the merits of hot and cold coffee, creating a lot of buzz and getting across an impression of the Nestlé that its executives wanted.
  - Reward: A ride on a helicopter with a view of New York City from above.
- Losing team: Magna
  - Reasons for loss: While Magna's campaign was generally well-run, their promotional event failed to give any message about the product. Moreover, Magna spent vastly more than Net Worth, practically using up their entire budget and yet achieved inferior results to their competitors. Danny's insistence on having the entire team vote on every single major decision had severely slowed the team down in the planning stages, while Michael contributed virtually nothing to the task and was very disrespectful to Danny, causing the other Magna members to accuse him of hiding behind his immunity.
  - Initial Boardroom: Erin strongly made the case for Michael to lose his exemption, arguing that he had deliberately misused it to avoid doing any work on the task, and calling his character into question. Bren, meanwhile, stated that while Michael had been the team's weakest performer, Danny was the one most to blame for the loss.
  - Sent to boardroom: Danny, Michael, and Stephanie. Danny asked whether he could bring back Michael despite his exemption, to which Trump replied that while he personally didn't recommend it, he would allow it.
  - Firing verdict: Trump quickly deemed Stephanie to be safe, as the event planner she recommended had done a good job despite the arguably excessive amount the team had spent. Despite Trump heavily criticizing Michael's performance, he acknowledged that he was not directly at fault for the loss, and had not committed any rule breach serious enough to deserve having his exemption revoked. This therefore left Danny to be fired by default as the losing project manager.
- Fired: Danny Kastner – for lackluster leadership, being too polite and conciliatory while in charge, having the entire team agree on a decision and inability to make decisions as a leader, bringing Michael to the Final Boardroom, who was exempt from termination, back to the boardroom in an unsuccessful attempt to get him fired anyway, and allowing himself to be manipulated into doing so by Erin. While Trump did say that he would have revoked Michael's immunity if he had committed a serious breach of the rules, he decided that laziness and incompetence was not enough of a reason for Michael to lose his immunity. Trump and his advisors felt that while Erin had clearly manipulated him into bringing Michael back, ultimately it would not have mattered who he chose to come back into the final boardroom, and that he was solely responsible for the team's loss.
- Notes
  - This episode features the first time in Apprentice history that a contestant quit for personal reasons, namely Verna. Verna is the only candidate this season not to have been project manager.
  - Trump nonetheless said he was sorry to see Danny go, and still liked him on a personal level and also warned Michael (who was exempt from firing this week) to step up and to not let it happen again.
  - In his exit interview Danny played his guitar and sang about his experience. He then signed out by saying " Rock and Roll"
- Episode Recap on NBC.com

=== Week 4: Soap Dopes ===
- Airdate: February 10, 2005
- Task sponsor: Dove and Deutsch Inc.
- Task scope: Teams are asked to create a 30-second advertising commercial for a new product from Dove: Cool Moisture Body Wash. The winner will be decided by Donny Deutsch and advertising executives from Dove.
- Judges: Donald Trump; Carolyn Kepcher; George H. Ross
- Magna project manager: Erin
- Net Worth project manager: Kristen
- Trump Monologue Never Settle – People settle for mediocrity because they are lazy.
- Winning team: No winning team – upon viewing the finished commercials, Donny deemed them both to be so atrocious that he told Trump he couldn't even consider naming either team as the winner. As a result, Trump declared that both Magna and Net Worth had lost the task, and that both teams would return to the boardroom.
- Losing team: Magna and Net Worth
  - Reasons for loss of Magna: Bren came up with a ridiculous idea involving a woman trying to seduce a man by washing a cucumber with him (in a very sexually implicit way), only for the man to walk off with another man. The commercial came off as "weird vegetable porn" and included no other information about the soap, which was only featured on-screen for five seconds at the end.
  - Sent to boardroom (Magna): Erin, Michael, and Bren
  - Reasons for loss of Net Worth: While the soap of the product was featured much more in Net Worth's commercial, Donny Deutsch disliked the fact that they had a runner applying the soap directly to his face and rubbing the soap off with a towel. While he was supposed to use water from a hydration point along with the soap, Kristen decided to just film him using the soap in order to save time. The Dove executives also felt that the product was used inappropriately, as it was intended as a full-body wash and not a facial soap.
  - Sent to boardroom (Net Worth): Kristen, Tana, and Audrey.
  - Firing Verdict:
    - After returning to the final boardroom, Trump took the unusual step of telling Erin on Magna that she was in absolutely no danger of being fired, since she had led the team well, and that she would instead be fighting to save Bren (who came up with their awful idea) and Michael (who had contributed the least to the task).
    - Erin's defense with Magna's team effort impressed Trump, which led to no one on Magna being eliminated.
    - When it came to Net Worth, Kristen was told in no uncertainty that she was facing dismissal, especially when Audrey and Tana admitted that they would rather see Kristen fired than Bren or Michael, despite the two men being on the opposing team.
    - Trump was confused why Audrey and Tana were picked for the boardroom, and he ultimately deemed Kristen as the most liable for the loss as she didn't control her team and failed to follow through on the original concept.
    - Kristen tried to defend herself by saying that her team was hard to manage, but this backfired when Trump stated his belief that the other team (Magna) was harder to manage.
- Fired: Kristen Kirchner – for bad leadership, not holding her team together, being difficult to work with, bringing back Tana and Audrey for no good reason, and most crucially making the fatal mistake of removing the washing if the soap during the commercial filming. Trump felt that while Magna had held together well and tried their hardest to execute a very poorly conceived idea, Kristen had a good idea in her hands but completely ruined its execution, which he deemed unforgivable.
- Notes
  - Prior to the task briefing, Bren calmly but sternly laid into Michael for his actions in the previous task, claiming that he didn't give a damn about the team and needed to step up, claiming "the dad in me woke up when he chastised him.
  - This episode features the first time in Apprentice history that there are no winning team or a reward due to both teams completely failing at the task. This happened again in The Apprentice (American season 8).
  - In the boardroom, Chris made several homophobic remarks when discussing Magna's advert. Trump asked Chris whether he was in fact gay himself, but Chris strongly denied that this was the case, which got an openly skeptical reaction from the other candidates. Erin meanwhile defended the homosexual overtones by pointing out the hit show Will & Grace, a show notable for featuring gay characters prominently.
  - Prior to the initial boardroom, Kristen got Tana to agree to back her up against Audrey in the final boardroom. In the initial boardroom however, Kristen accused Tana of being rude to the actors hired for the commercial, which quickly caused Tana to turn on Kristen and say that she was at fault for the loss and should be fired.
  - The episode ended with a professionally produced ad for the week's product.
  - While Net Worth's marathon runner commercial was a failure on The Apprentice, the same concept was used on a commercial in France for Mennen Sport.
  - Trump was very irritated by the results of this week. He later admitted he was so unhappy that he was tempted to fire them all and bring in all new candidates.
- Episode Recap on NBC.com

=== Week 5: Airstream of Consciousness ===
- Airdate: February 17, 2005
- Sponsor: Visa USA and Airstream
- Magna project manager: Bren
- Net Worth project manager: Tana
- Project: Teams had to create their own mobile service business from Airstream. The team with the most profit wins.
- Judges: Donald Trump; George H. Ross; Jill Cremer
- Trump Monologue Instinct – Emphasizes the importance of trusting Instincts.
- Winning team: Net Worth
  - Reasons for Victory: Net Worth earned a profit of $991. Net Worth did a mobile casting business which proved be a hit despite the risks, leading to result of having a stronger marketing plan.
  - Reward for Winning: $20,000 shopping spree for pearls at Mikimoto.
- Losing team: Magna
  - Reasons for loss: Although they had a good concept of mobile spa-massaging service and had a good location, Magna had weak marketing strategies. They had only earned $918.50, losing by almost $73. Michael, who was charge of Marketing didn't contribute much of anything to the task, while Stephanie's negative attitude and questioning of Bren's decisions deflated Magna.
  - Initial Boardroom: Trump grilled Magna over their awful track record of winning only 1 out of the 5 tasks and seeing that Net Worth has been consistently beating them. When asked who should be fired most of team Magna agreed Bren had done well, and were divided on Stephanie, who had very questionable behavior and showed little respect for Bren, and Michael who was ineffective with the Marketing and didn't make any large contribution.
  - Sent to boardroom: Bren, Stephanie, and Michael
  - Firing verdict: When Trump asked Bren who should be fired, he selected Stephanie, which led to a lengthy argument between the two. Michael interrupted the argument in an effort to back up Stephanie, but this only served to anger Trump, who asked Michael why he was bringing attention to himself during an argument between two people who were more directly at fault for the loss. Michael attempted to explain that he was just supporting what Stephanie was saying about Bren, but Trump decided he'd had enough of Michael and fired him.
  - Fired: Michael Tarshi – for his poor contributions in the last three tasks, not doing the marketing correctly on this task, maintaining a negative attitude, and for making too many excuses, in addition to saying the wrong thing at the wrong time. While Trump felt Stephanie was mainly responsible for her team loss due to her lousy attitude, he decided that Michael's poor performances and interjections in the boardroom gave him enough evidence to fire Michael and give Stephanie a second chance.
- Notes:
  - In this task, Jill Cremer fills in for Carolyn. This is the first time Carolyn is absent.
  - An additional factor in Michael's firing was that he twice claimed to be the same type of person as Trump; once during a camera interview, and then again in the boardroom. Trump took offense to this claim, telling Michael immediately before his firing: "You claim to be like me? The difference is, I work hard! You've been lazy and nothing but trouble."
  - Bren stated that he thought Michael actually had more to offer the team than Stephanie, noting that Michael had at least been a good Project Manager on the second task, whereas Stephanie hadn't done much throughout the process.
  - Michael left his business card on the boardroom table for Trump after he was fired, telling Trump to contact him the next time he's in Boston, and that he owns a "very large parking lot" in town.
  - This is the last time that Net Worth (and by extension, both Angie and Chris) won a task. Conversely, it was also the final time that Kendra was on the losing team.
  - This is the first time this season where the project manager is not fired.

=== Week 6: The Writing on the Wall ===
- Airdate: February 24, 2005
- Sponsor: Sony Electronics and PlayStation
- Magna project manager: Alex
- Net Worth project manager: Tara
- Project: Create a graffiti tag in Harlem to promote the Sony PlayStation 2 game Gran Turismo 4. The winner will determined as judged by Sony PlayStation's executives, who will base their decision on feedback from local residents.
- Judges: Donald Trump; George H. Ross; Jill Cremer
- Trump Monologue Shut Up And Listen Trump emphasizes the importance of listening, one doesn't have to follow what others are saying but it is important to listen in order to learn.
- Winning team: Magna
  - Reasons for victory: Magna's advert was eye-catching and showcased the variety of scenery and vehicles featured in the game. It also made good use of the Sony and Gran Turismo branding, clearly communicating their message to the locals. Magna also talked to locals about what they would like to see in a Gran Turismo ad, and directly used their feedback.
  - Reward for Winning: Photo shoot for individual portraits with world-famous photographer Patrick Demarchelier.
- Losing team: Net Worth
  - Reasons for loss: Tara decided to focus more on creating a piece of art rather than an ad, feeling that focusing too much on the advertising aspect would be disrespectful to the Harlem community. Unfortunately, this ended up making the graffiti unrelated to the brands, and didn't tell the residents anything about the game itself, which gave them no reason to buy it. In addition, at least one member of the focus group felt that the graffiti represented a stereotypical view of Harlem.
  - Sent to boardroom: Tara, Audrey, Craig
  - Firing verdict:
    - George identified Tara's main error as being that she came up with their concept and decided to make it community-focused before even finding out what exactly they were supposed to be advertising, and only minimally altered it after being fully briefed. Tara was also noted to have tried to claim all the credit for the advert during her presentation to the Sony executives, which did not help her cause.
    - Audrey pointed out that it was ridiculous to expect her or John to know anything about the fourth game when it hadn't even been released yet, and re-iterated that Tara had decided on the specific concept without consulting anyone else on the team. Despite this, Tara initially intended to bring the two back into the final boardroom, but after Craig strongly criticized her leadership, she decided to bring him back rather than John. While Trump said that he would have still fired Tara had she brought back John instead of Craig, he and George were both unimpressed by her decision, feeling it to be excessively petty.
    - Trump and his advisors questioned why Tara brought in Craig, and she justified this by saying he got into an argument with Audrey about being recently married, which left Trump unimpressed.
    - Craig further hurt Tara's chances by saying he would fire Tara over Audrey (who was also not responsible for the loss), saying he didn't like her concept. Trump agreed and despite Tara's strong defense, Trump couldn't overlook her mistakes and had virtually no choice but to fire her.
  - Fired: Tara Dowdell – for ignoring the executives' wishes and producing an inoffensive but useless final ad, misinterpreting the point that it was a marketing task, and for allowing her emotions to tie into her decision to bring Craig into the final boardroom. While Trump felt Tara had great potential and was stronger than Audrey, her major mistakes, failing to understand the task, and Craig's testimony completely sealed her fate.
- Special notes:
  - Jill Cremer once again fills in for Carolyn in this episode.
  - John and Audrey, who were both fans of Gran Turismo 3 attempted to help Tara make their concept more relevant to the game, but she ignored them and later claimed in the boardroom that their feedback was irrelevant since it applied to the third game and not the fourth.
  - Even though Tara was fired Trump acknowledged she had great potential and was clearly a strong contender, but he and his advisors agreed she blew the task too badly to give her a second chance, even if Trump felt Audrey was a weaker candidate.
  - Episode Recap on NBC.com

=== Week 7: Project Putt-putt ===
- Airdate: March 3, 2005
- Sponsor: Golfing segment of The Trump Organization
- Hosting Company: Chelsea Piers
- Magna project manager: Stephanie
- Net Worth project manager: Audrey
- Project: To build a miniature golf course and attract the most business of sales revenue.
- Judges: Donald Trump; Carolyn Kepcher; Ashley Cooper
- Trump Monologue Play Golf Trump simply discusses his love for the sports and how it can help people come together.
- Winning team: Magna
- Reasons for win: They earned a total profit of $508. Kendra cut Net Worth off at the knees by doing exclusive promotion deals to place her flyers at many other kid-friendly establishments. Thanks to this Magna was able to get more kids playing mini golf than Net Worth.
  - Reward for Winning: Play golf with Trump and Cristie Kerr.
- Losing team: Net Worth
  - Reasons for loss: They lost by $204 with a total profit of $304. John was disrespectful to Audrey, who was ineffective and not assertive, and maintained a negative attitude throughout the task, which didn't go unnoticed by guest observer Ashley Cooper. Chris also alienated kids with his tobacco chewing and was lambasted for that in the team’s clown costumes.
  - Sent to boardroom: Audrey, Craig, John, and Angie. - Audrey is the only person in this season to bring three people back into the boardroom. In the previous season, Trump had given the project manager a choice of bringing back two or three people, but frequently got two as a response. In this episode, after Audrey's selections, Trump said he "usually wouldn't do it", but allowed her to.
  - Fired: Audrey Evans – for her lack of leadership, inability to control the team, losing the respect of the entire team, blaming everyone except Tana for the loss, for being unable to take responsibility in the decision-making, and for bringing Angie to the final boardroom without any valid explanation. While it was strongly implied that Audrey brought back Angie so that she could advocate against John, Audrey never actually explained this prior to or during the boardroom as Trump angrily asked Audrey why she brought Angie back which led Angie to angrily change her mind state that Audrey deserved to be fired rather than John.
- Special notes:
  - Ashley Cooper fills in for George Ross in this week's episode.
  - John was given a final warning by Trump, who while not considering him to be directly to blame for the loss, was bothered by his behavior towards Audrey, as well as the fact that this was the third time a losing project manager had singled him out for criticism, after Brian in Week 2 and Tara the previous week.
- Episode Recap on NBC.com

=== Week 8: Bling it On ===
- Airdate: March 10, 2005
- Hosting Company: FUSE TV, a cable-TV channel
- Magna project manager: Kendra
- Net Worth project manager: Chris
- Corporate Reshuffle: Before the project began, the project managers (Chris and Kendra) were assigned to send two people from their current team to the other side. Kendra sent Erin and Stephanie to Net Worth, while Chris shipped Tana and Craig over to Magna.
- Project: To run a charity auction where the bidders will get special attention/prizes from famous music stars.
- Judges: Donald Trump; Carolyn Kepcher; George H. Ross
- Trump Monologue Go Big or Go Home Trump talks about aiming for the stars, swinging for the fences.
- Winning team: Magna.
  - Reasons for Victory: While three of their five items sold for low prices, Craig and Tana were able to negotiate a pair of weeks on tour with Moby and Lil' Kim, and those two items single-handedly outgrossed Net Worth's entire line-up. Magna raised $21,654.
  - Reward for Winning: None, since this was a charity episode.
- Losing team: Net Worth
  - Reasons for Loss: John took charge of the negotiations, but didn't listen to what the musicians were telling him and negotiated a broadly similar set of prizes from all five of them (ex. playing a gig at someone's house), meaning that none of their items stood out. Net Worth raised $11,325.
  - Sent to Boardroom: Chris, John, and Erin
  - Fired: John Gafford – for bad, repetitive negotiations by pitching the same thing to the celebrities and not listening to what the Musicians wanted, his insubordination in the past boardroom sessions by being singled out by past Project Managers (including Brian, Tara, and Audrey) for criticism, and for having totally fallen apart after being one of the frontrunners early in the season. Although that Carolyn felt that Chris could've managed his team better by delegating and also managing as well (Trump said he didn't managed the team), Trump felt that John's responsibility for the negotiations is what caused the team to lose.
- Notes:
  - Gene Simmons and Lil Jon, who appeared in this episode, would return as contestants in Celebrity Apprentice and Celebrity Apprentice 4 respectively, with Lil Jon subsequently returning for All-Star Celebrity Apprentice.
  - This episode saw the first appearance of Donald Trump Jr. on the show, when he was seen watching the auction on television with his father. Donald Jr. would later become a boardroom judge in his own right.
  - In the boardroom, Trump questioned whether Chris regretted his decision to remove Craig and Tana from the team, considering they were most responsible for Magna's success. Chris stood by his decision however, and accused them of disrupting the team's harmony in the prior tasks.
  - Chris lost his temper at George and Carolyn and George asked him to lower his voice, which he did.
  - John later claimed that Donald Trump expressed a wish to fire Stephanie (who had immunity from her week 7 win as project manager), but this has never been confirmed.
- Episode Recap on NBC.com

=== Mid-Season Highlights: What You Didn't See... ===
- Airdate: March 17, 2005
- This episode featured unaired footage from the first eight weeks. Among other new details:
  - The Net Worth team struggled while learning how to use Burger King's computerized order system.
  - Kendra found a great bargain on furniture, but Michael's decision to have Bren and Danny pick it up instead of paying for delivery led them to bad-mouth him as they got lost on the winding roads of New Jersey.
  - Brian gave a post-firing interview where he declared that he did a great job on his task and Donald Trump should hire him anyway.
  - Michael and Stephanie both annoy their teammates with their poor attitudes during the Airstream task.
  - After Stephanie and Erin are cast off of Magna by Kendra, Chris asks Donald Trump if he can send them back; as everyone but Stephanie and Erin laughs heartily, Trump says no, but also that he'll remember the request.
  - Tana asks Erin, who was cut from Magna to Net Worth along with Stephanie, if Erin and Stephanie will trade bedrooms so that each set of traded competitors (Tana and Craig are the other one) can be near their new teams. Erin was angered by the request and said no.

=== Week 9: Pandora's Box ===
- Airdate: March 24, 2005
- Hosting Company: Home Depot
- Magna project manager: Craig
- Net Worth project manager: Angie
- Project: To create a short presentation/event for Home Depot.
- Judges: Donald Trump; Carolyn Kepcher; George H. Ross
- Trump Monologue Sell Your Ideas Trump Discusses the importance of presenting proposals and proper communication, if a great idea is not proposed adequately it will fail.
- Winning team: Magna
  - Reasons for victory: Craig decided the team should simply design a box. After Craig's teammates felt his concept was mediocre with no imagination, the presentation ends up being a big draw for the children because they can finger paint, draw on boxes, and build it with their parents.
  - Reward for Winning: Taking a ride in a Zero-G jet, simulating weightlessness in space.
- Losing team: Net Worth
  - Reasons for loss: Net Worth decides to build a mobile kitchen island. They had a good concept, but their presentation fell apart and it flops as Chris puts the top on upside down, and their originality short-timing presentation goes off being more than 20 minutes long. The crucial factor, in the eyes of the expert assessors, was that it is vital for a clinic to have customer involvement while Net Worth did the assembly themselves.
  - Sent to Boardroom: Chris, Angie, and Erin
  - Initial task: During the task of Net Worth, Erin said that she doesn't know about Home Depot. And Angie decided not having her as a presenter of the team's presentation, since she felt Erin's bad attitude.
  - Firing Verdict: Trump says Erin should have been the presenter and considers firing Angie, even though George and Carolyn advised against it. When Trump acknowledged that he usually listens to his advisors, Erin coyly asked "Do you have to?", and even winked at Trump. An offended Carolyn called it "a dumb statement", and Trump calls her a "wise guy" and then he said, "You know what Erin? You're fired!".
  - Fired: Erin Elmore – for not contributing anything and maintaining a bad attitude throughout this task, attempting to flirt with Trump in the boardroom and being openly disrespectful to Carolyn and George.
- Episode Recap on NBC.com

=== Week 10: The Pie's the Limit ===
- Airdate: March 31, 2005
- Hosting Company: Domino's Pizza
- Magna project manager: Bren
- Net Worth project manager: Stephanie
- Corporate Shuffle: Alex is shifted from Magna to Net Worth in this episode since they are down two members.
- Project: To create a new pizza for Domino's Pizza, and sell it from a mobile street trailer.
- Judges: Donald Trump; Carolyn Kepcher; George H. Ross
- Trump Monologue: Know When to Fold - Trump abstractly explains to give up on ideas that might be great on the drawing board, but don't work better in practice. They should be shuttered so that you can start focuses on the next prospect. Note: The monologue was irrelevant to the task or the groups performance.
- Winning team: Magna with a total profit of $653.12
  - Reasons for Victory: Tana brings out her Italian cooking knowledge and builds a nice design. While Kendra & Tana used their negotiation strategies to target the team's marketing. Magna did well because they decided to sell to the city banks who would give them big orders. They also managed to please the customers despite struggling to make pizzas quickly.
  - Reward for Winning: Having breakfast with Trump in his gold-plated palace apartment.
- Losing team: Net Worth with a total profit of $523.90
  - Reasons for Loss: Chris and Alex sell a bunch of advanced-order pizzas to a construction site near where the task starts. Unfortunately the actual selling site the next day winds up being across town. There are so many pizzas that it takes two people to carry them on the subway. Stephanie decides to go do this personally and apologizes to the workers because she feels it is a failure of honor to have the pizzas get there late. While Stephanie is gone from the pizza making site, Chris gets in a fight with Alex, Alex asserts himself, Chris makes aggressive statements. Later on during discussion Stephanie uses the word "threat", which Alex then agrees is what happened. Stephanie tries to use all this in the boardroom to get Chris fired, but doesn't process that Alex explicitly says he won't only be targeting Chris in the Boardroom. The marketing street workers that Net Worth hires mill around and do not hit the hot spots, focusing their energies on the NYU campus which has people around at lunch but is not as busy as the business areas that Magna succeeds with.
  - Sent to boardroom: Alex, Stephanie, and Chris
    - Firing Verdict:
      - Carolyn made it clear that she wanted Chris to go because she was concerned about his volatility.
      - However, while Trump was upset at Chris' performance, he was more concerned about Stephanie's poor leadership skills and her inability to handle difficult people.
      - This caused Trump to fire Stephanie instead of Chris as the ability to overlook subordinates is an important task for a project manager.
      - Additionally, Alex said he would prefer to work with Chris instead of Stephanie, saying she was bad at every task and her performances were only good by comparison.
  - Fired: Stephanie Myers – for weak leadership, the bad decision with the construction site delivery (which Trump disliked), her inability to control her team, inability to deal with difficult people in a professional environment, and lingering disdain stemming from her efforts earlier in the season. Trump felt that Stephanie isn't strong to handle people that are insubordinate.
- Notes:
  - Both teams use 'meatballs' as Pizza toppings since Trump said he likes meatballs. Trump later told the teams that research showed customers don't like meatball pizza, preferring cheeseburger pizza instead.
  - Stephanie, a vegetarian, forces herself to eat the meatball pizzas and says that she likes it to her team.
  - Carolyn was visibly unhappy with the decision to keep Chris, but agreed that Stephanie was a poor leader. Trump warned Chris to "get on the ball" warning he will not last too long and he has been a poor performer each week.
- Episode Recap on NBC.com

=== Week 11: Seams Stress ===
- Airdate: April 7, 2005
- Sponsor: American Eagle
- Magna project manager: Tana
- Net Worth project manager: Alex
- Project: To design some kind of 'high tech' modifications to clothing for American Eagle Outfitters company. Each team will have Visa Cards of $5,000 budget.
- Judges: Donald Trump; Carolyn Kepcher; Michelle Scarborough
- Trump Monologue Let Nothing Get In Your Way Trump just says you should never give up.
- Winning team: Magna
  - Reasons for victory: Magna does more research than Net Worth, figuring out that the gadget the market most wants is the cell phone even though when Bren and Craig brought back clothing that has been manhandled by the silkscreen shop, with paint blobs and a backwards logo on one of the items.
  - Reward for Winning: Shopping at Bergdorf Goodman
- Losing team: Net Worth
  - Reasons for loss: Net Worth didn't bring a lot of details on their high tech gadgets in front of the executives. During some of the task, Angie felt Alex assigned her too many tasks and felt she was taking too much responsibility, pointing on the checklist which gave her about 19 things to do. They also had to make a last minute change in the order when one of the models forgot his item back at the designing store, and a flustered Angie stumbled in the presentation because of this.
  - Sent to Boardroom: Chris, Alex, and Angie - Trump requested all of Net Worth to wait in the reception area.
  - Firing Verdict:
    - Carolyn criticizes Chris for making tremendous excuses, while Michelle criticizes Angie for a mediocre presentation.
    - Trump says that Chris and Angie have both been in the boardroom six-consecutive appearances.
    - Trump goes on to attack Angie, while saying that Alex had done well but was brought down by the two "losers".
    - Trump asks Angie if she "choked", to which after much hassling from Trump, she felt that she could have done better but admits that she did, and then she's fired. Carolyn was visibly displeased by this, but Trump says that he doesn't like "chokers" and that he doesn't want them in his organization.
  - Fired: Angie McKnight – for stumbling during the presentation, for not being able to handle the pressure, for trying to blame her mistakes in the task on Alex and avoid taking responsibility for them which displeased Trump, and for her six-week losing streak.
- Special notes:
  - Michelle Scarbrough, a Trump Organization staff attorney, filled in for George on this task.
  - In her exit interview, Angie says she wants everyone to know that she didn't "choke".
- Episode Recap on NBC.com

=== Week 12: A Lonely Drive ===
- Airdate: April 14, 2005
- Sponsor: Pontiac and General Motors
- Magna project manager: Kendra
- Net Worth project manager: Chris
- Corporate Shuffle: Net Worth chooses Bren to come over from Magna due to a two-person deficit.
- Project: To create and promote a sales advertorial for the Pontiac Solstice car.
- Judges: Donald Trump; Carolyn Kepcher; George H. Ross
  - Dramatic Tension: On Magna, Tana and Craig go to sleep before it is done (a decision that ended up haunting Tana later on, as she openly stated she was not going to pull an all-nighter because she couldn't be fired anyway), appearing to leave Kendra to finish it all (the Finale qualified this, as it revealed that Craig did return to the task to help Kendra finish it, while Tana slumbered uninterrupted). In the presentation to Pontiac, Tana tries to unjustifiably take over speaking duties from Kendra but Kendra fends her off and the team ends up netting a good result. On Net Worth, Alex took a nap early in the morning between 5:15am and 6:30am and during their presentation to Pontiac, Chris gets nervous and stumbles over his lines, making up new words like 'interiorally and exteriorally'.
- Winning team: Magna
  - Reasons for Victory: They delivered the emotion of the Pontiac Solstice in a creative way. Magna comes up with a round advertorial that looks very interesting and unique and has spaces for a CD and business cards. Its theme is the emotions that the car engenders. Pontiac is so impressed that they decide to use the editorials in their stores.
  - Reward for winning: A basketball shoot-around at Madison Square Garden with Isiah Thomas and the New York Knicks' Penny Hardaway and Jamal Crawford.
- Losing team: Net Worth
  - Reasons for loss: Their goal in delivering an emotional, persuasive message did not come through. Net Worth's editorial has boring writing and looks generic. The lead photograph of the car is blurred with the intention of conveying speed.
  - Initial Boardroom: George rages on their 'fuzzy picture'. Alex says Bren's writing is boring. Bren defends his writing by saying Alex should have told him the problem sooner. Alex told Trump he took a nap early in the morning and Trump questioned why he would take a nap when he was fighting for his life.
  - Sent to boardroom: No final boardroom - Trump starts grilling Chris about why he has been in the boardroom losing so much. Chris does not flip out but admits that they lost. Donald asks George and Carolyn whom they would fire and they both say Chris. This, and a seven-week losing streak, seals Chris's fate. He starts to cry in the boardroom after he is fired (an Apprentice first). Trump calls him back to shake his hand and tell him he is a good kid and to stop chewing tobacco and watch his temper.
  - Fired: Chris Shelton – for producing a terrible, generic-looking brochure, his horrendous track record including his seven-week losing streak, being on 3 wins and 9 losses, and two failures as Project Manager/Team Leader, as well as his lack of ability to control his emotions and partially because of his addiction to tobacco (despite working hard to stop throughout the season). Although Bren's writing was boring and Alex didn't too much on the task, Trump felt it was obvious for Chris to go since he has been consistently losing each week. This was the seventh consecutive week that Chris was on the losing team, breaking the previous record of six weeks, that was held jointly by Kwame Jackson and Troy McClain of season one, and Angie in this season.
- Special notes:
  - Craig and Tana left Kendra alone to work on the Solstice advertisement, with Tana citing her Immunity. George Ross would jump on this point during the final episode when Kendra and Tana were the Final 2.
  - This is the first time (outside of finales) that Trump is shown shaking the hand of a contestant in the boardroom after firing him.
  - With Chris's firing, Net Worth no longer had any of its pre-reshuffle members on the team.
  - After announcing Magna's reward for winning the task, Trump told Net Worth that the only slam dunk they were going to see was going to be in the boardroom when Trump fired one of them.
- Episode Recap on NBC.com

=== Week 13: I Can't Believe It's Not Clutter ===
- Airdate: April 21, 2005
- Hosting Company: Staples
- Magna project manager: Craig
- Net Worth project manager: Alex
- Project: To design an office organizer for Staples and successfully present it to a focus group of Staples executives and managers.
- Judges: Donald Trump; Carolyn Kepcher; George H. Ross
- Winning team: Magna
  - Reasons for Win: Magna (Craig, Kendra, and Tana) creates a space-saving, efficient desk organizer (See 'Special notes' below) in spite of continued conflict between Craig and Kendra. They held face-to-face meetings with the Staples executives and a group of managers as a focus group. The product clearly connected with the customers, who thought it was innovative, practical, and they would buy it.
  - Reward for Winning: Breakfast at the Rainbow Room with George and Carolyn
- Losing team: Net Worth
  - Reason for Loss: Net Worth created an invention that wasted space and was awkwardly arranged. They did not hit the mark, and once the top cover was flipped over, there was no place to go and no slide-in features, and the product was too big. This paled in comparison to Magna's space-friendly and efficient invention, while Net Worth essentially had a second mobile desk. Alex had also decided to dispense with face-to-face meetings in order to save time, which led to Bren being unable to set up a focus group conference call.
  - Initial Boardroom: George is embarrassed at both Alex and Bren for poor invention skills, although Alex and Bren thought they had a better-looking product. The focus of this boardroom was that Alex and Bren's invention took up too much space, plus all the papers and supplies had to be placed in an awkwardly inconvenient matter. Carolyn pointed out the design/invention flaws during the boardroom. Donald, George, and Carolyn apparently were not happy with the difficulty of use arising from this "Packrat" invention idea Alex and Bren had.
  - Sent to boardroom: No final boardroom - Alex showed his killer instinct in the boardroom while Bren let slip that he does not like to take risks at all. Among the risky ventures Alex cited to Trump were training as a competitive skier, going to a graduate school program in Israel, and working as a government lobbyist. This caught the attention of Trump; Bren was therefore fired for his inability to take risks and for his poor entrepreneurship.
  - Fired: Bren Olswanger – for his unwillingness to take risks and Trump's recognition that he was simply not as business-tested as the other candidates. Trump told Bren that he felt like he was teaching Bren coming out of kindergarten.
- Special notes:
  - Trump stated that regardless of the outcome of this task, because the interview is entering its final stages, no further exemptions would be issued.
  - Alex did not specify whether his education in Israel was a risk because of how it might impact his professional prospects or if it was based on the tumult in the country during the time he was there.
  - You can now purchase Magna's invention (officially dubbed and released as The Desk Apprentice) at Staples stores everywhere or through Staples Online for about US$29.99.
  - Bren is the first person fired this season to have a winning record in the tasks (7–6).
- Episode Recap on NBC.com

=== Week 14: Bedazzled by a Beefy T ===
- Airdate: April 28, 2005
- Hosting Company: Hanes
- Magna project manager: Kendra
- Net Worth project manager: Tana
- Project: To work with pop artists to design a T-shirt for Hanes celebrating their 50th anniversary, and make the most money selling the shirt.
- Judges: Donald Trump; Carolyn Kepcher; George H. Ross
- Dramatic Tension: On Magna, Craig and Kendra continued to clash with each other throughout the task, Kendra wanted Craig to get her OK to make decisions, but Craig continuously argued against Kendra's ideas feeling that selling the shirts as art rather than just a simple textile milled item, and changed the price points on some of their shirts to an incentivized volumed level. Craig also said Kendra was indecisive but then got annoyed with her for telling him to keep them at the cost they'd agreed on. On Net Worth, Tana wasted several hours traveling to and from Staten Island to buy beads and accessories to attach to their T-shirts since she wanted to use the bedazzler on their clothes. This bothered Alex since he told her it's a long drive from Manhattan.
- Winning team: Magna
  - Reasons for Win: The team ultimately won out by exploiting their artist's existing fanbase and contacts list, selling over half of their stock.
  - Reward: Engaging in a Dogfight in two fighter planes. Kendra's plane won out over Craig's. Kendra revealed that her father had been a "Top Gun" pilot.
- Losing team: Net Worth
  - Reasons for Loss: Though Tana did succeed in upselling the customised T-shirts, Alex failed to effectively market them and they sold them in quantities far too small to give them any real chance of victory, shifting barely a fifth of their stock.
  - Sent to Boardroom: Alex and Tana—Net Worth was under internal review as Trump requested both of them to wait at the reception area.
  - Firing Verdict:
    - Trump considered firing Tana but she defended herself of her career capabilities that she can work for Trump. And also, she defended herself with her better 2–1 PM record & 9–5 team record than Alex's.
    - Tana was criticized for making some blatant decisions to go to Staten Island.
    - Trump grilled Alex of how many times he won & lost as Project Manager and Alex stated that he won once and lost once. Trump viewed Alex's statement dishonest because he lost twice from being the PM three times. Trump mentioned that he lost from Task 11 (Wearable Technology) & Task 13 (Staples). The last time he won as PM was the PlayStation task from the graffiti billboard, which was eight weeks ago. Trump fired Alex instead for wanting Tana to make loads of mistakes from this task and keeping track of her mistakes instead of contributing.
  - Fired: Alex Thomason – for not contributing much to the task, his five-week losing streak, and also for saying he had only lost once as Project Manager—Donald Trump viewed Alex's statement as dishonest because he has been a losing PM twice, although Alex claimed that he had forgotten about being project manager last week with Bren, as they had shared responsibilities on the task (but the fact that they were disorganized and lost that task badly didn't help Alex's case either). Although both Tana & Alex failed to mention at marketing in their sales segment and are both responsible for the loss, Tana brought up with numerous ideas and did most of the sales while Alex just took a back seat and hope that Tana failed.
- Notes:
- An interesting note is that Magna always won when Michael was either PM or not on the team, and always lost when he was on the team as a 'regular' member (not PM). Ironically, Michael stated in his exit interview that Magna would crumble without him on the team
- Magna won 9 tasks in a row which is the longest consecutive winning streak of any team. However the longest consecutive winning streak by an individual player belongs to Amy Henry in the first season with 10 consecutive wins.
- Episode Recap from NBC.com

=== Week 15: The Interviews ===
- Task scope: Have an interview with four high-profile business executives:
  - Dave Brandon, Chairman & CEO of Domino's Pizza
  - Darlene Daggett, President of U.S. Commerce, QVC
  - Howard Lorber, President of Prudential Douglas Elliman Real Estate
  - Greg Brenneman, Chairman & CEO of Burger King
- Results: All four executives agreed that they would not hire Craig, given that his answers were not specific and did not have any substance. Two of the executives stated they would hire Tana, because she had exceptional entrepreneurial skills and felt that Tana was the perfect balance of a mother, housewife, and businesswoman. They also felt that Kendra was a questionable candidate, with one of the executives calling Kendra's answers "scripted". On the contrary, the other two executives felt that Kendra was the best candidate, believing that she had amazing potential (while also being very young and unproven) and questioned Tana's ability to work in a metropolitan environment.
- Fired: Craig Williams – for being unanimously deemed the worst by executives and for not having what it takes to be The Apprentice.

=== Week 16: The Games People Play & Week 17: Into the Stretch ===
- Airdates: May 5, 12 and 19, 2005
- Judges: Donald Trump; Carolyn Kepcher; George H. Ross
- Sponsors:
  - Book Smarts: PlayStation, Best Buy, and Electronic Arts Sports Division
  - Street Smarts: NYC 2012 Olympics Board/Committee with the City of New York
- Book Smarts Finalist: Kendra
- Street Smarts Finalist: Tana
- Project:
  - Book Smarts: Best Buy Fight Night Promotion.
  - Street Smarts: NYC 2012 Athlete Challenge Test.
- Hired: Kendra Todd – for attaining a 3–0 record as project manager, having an impressive team record of 10–4, not once being called into the final boardroom by another project manager, and doing such a superb job on her final project.
- Fired: Tana Goertz – for insulting her team members and not leading her team well enough, failing to coordinate the NYC 2012 event smoothly, and potentially for exploiting her immunity during the Week 12 Solstice task.
- Special notes:
  - The one-on-one interviews aired on the first part of the May 5, 2005 episode.
  - The first part of the final task was aired on May 5, 2005, after Craig's firing in the middle of Episode 15.
    - During the interviews, Kendra threatened that she would "compete" with Trump if he did not hire her.
    - All interviewers unanimously recommended that Craig was not suitable for the Trump Organization.
  - Second part of this episode was the allocation of the final tasks.
    - Since Kendra and Tana started out on opposing teams, it would become the final battle of Book Smarts vs Street Smarts
  - Trump picked three previously fired candidates to serve as the employees of each finalist.
    - Employees hired:
    - Magna (a.k.a. Book Smarts Team): Michael, Danny, and Erin
    - Net Worth (a.k.a. Street Smarts Team): Brian, Chris, and Kristen
  - George Ross made a key statement to the assembled teams before they left to begin the task, telling them "Bosses are free to use their employees any way they want to." This was a major point of contention in the Season 1 finale, with Kwame Jackson wanting to "fire" Omarosa from his team after her repeated mistake and blatant lying, but not being sure if he was allowed to do this; it was also an issue to some extent in Season 2 when Kelly was frustrated with Raj and John's laziness and stupidity (though in that case, he did not ask to fire them, but was tempted to before he actually convinced them to work hard for the rest of the task). Kendra and Tana were the 1st finalists to know that they could in fact get rid of useless team members (ironically, despite major issues with at least one of those underlings, neither of them actually did so). Tana actually asked if there was any way they could "discuss" trading some of the employees amongst the teams, and Carolyn immediately told her "No."
  - Although it appeared that Tana and Kendra's employees were going to discuss their employers on the finale (based on the ending to the penultimate episode), the finale went directly to the live hiring instead. It was speculated that because Tana's performance had been completely thrashed, that the producers decided not to show it. This was in light of the criticism the show received for the endless footage on the previous season where most of the favorable comments were towards Kelly Perdew, and most of the negative feedback was directed towards Jennifer Massey.
  - The live finale took place in New York University
  - George Ross brought up Tana's comments during Week 12 about not having to work due to her immunity. This potentially influenced Trump's decision.
  - Before the final hiring decision was made, the two potential winning tasks were announced: the renovation of a massive mansion in Palm Beach, Florida, and a managing role with the Trump-owned Miss Universe Pageant. Kendra said she would like the renovation project because it fit with her real estate background and was not far from her home base in Florida, while Tana stated her preference was for the Miss Universe job.
  - In addition to becoming the first female Apprentice, Kendra became the first winner to never appear in the final boardroom (though the previous season's winner, Kelly Perdew only appeared in the final boardroom once, and was exempt on that occasion), along with being the first winner to stay on the original team throughout the entire interview process. Lastly, Kendra was the youngest person to become the Apprentice in all 15 seasons.
- Episode Fifteen Recap on NBC.com
- Episode Sixteen Recap on NBC.com
- Final Episode Recap on NBC.com

== Additional information ==
- The BBC showed this series in the UK on BBC2. The first episode aired on August 30, 2006, and the series finished on October 21, 2006.
- Following the season finale, Tana appeared in commercials for the Bedazzler, the very product she insisted on obtaining in the Hanes T-shirt episode. In the commercials, The Apprentice is not referred to by name and is only referred to as "national television."
- Kristen also appeared as a contestant in the 2001 Fox reality series Murder in Small Town X as a bleached-blond, wherein she was notable for having established contentious relationships with all of her fellow contestants. She was eliminated at the end of the 6th episode.
- Kendra's winning assignment involved overseeing $25 million of renovations to the aforementioned $41 million Trump property in Palm Beach, Florida. The property was recently sold to a Russian billionaire for $100 million, a drop from the initial listing of $125 million but still marking a very large profit for Trump. The billionaire said he and his family have no plans to move to Florida anytime soon.
