= Kendra Todd =

Winner of the 3rd season of The Apprentice

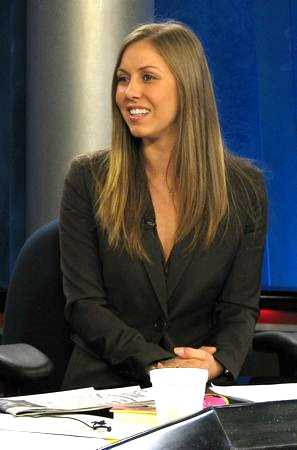
- Kendra Todd, 2006
- Born: April 6, 1978 (age 48); Virginia Beach, Virginia, U.S.
- Education: Bachelor's degree in Linguistics (University of Florida)
- Occupations: Real estate agent, author
- Website: Kendra Todd's Website

Kendra Todd (born April 6, 1978) is a real estate broker based in Seattle, Washington. In 2005, she was the winner of season 3 of NBC's The Apprentice. She was the first female candidate, and the youngest, to be hired on the U.S. Apprentice.

== Early life and career ==
Todd is a native of Virginia Beach, Virginia, now living in Seattle, Washington. Prior to becoming a candidate for the third season of The Apprentice, she was a successful real estate broker from Boynton Beach, Florida. At the time the show was recorded and produced, she was 26 years old.

She received a bachelor's degree in linguistics from the University of Florida. Prior to her career as a real estate broker, Todd launched a magazine called Capture Life Magazine featuring southern Florida lifestyle, which won the Florida Magazine Association Award for design.

In December, 2012, she married conservative radio host Jason Mattera.

== Performance on The Apprentice ==
Although Todd was one of the last candidates to become a project manager, she gave a very solid performance in this field, ending the show with a record of 3–0. Todd was never sent to the boardroom, and was never traded to the competing team. She remained on Team Magna for the entire duration of the show. And Todd had the longest winning streak in her season, with nine wins on Team Magna, starting in Week 6 until the interviews portion of the show took place.

== Life after The Apprentice ==
Todd chose to oversee the renovation of the oceanfront mansion Maison de L'Amitie at Palm Beach, Florida, rather than oversee the production of the next Miss Universe Pageant. Donald Trump charged Todd with a $25 million fix-up of the 60,000 square-foot property, which was purchased in 2008 for $95 million by Russian billionaire Dmitry Rybolovlev. The sale of the mansion is claimed to be the most expensive real estate transaction on record in the U.S. at the time.

In September, 2005, Todd was involved with the 'Find Your Dream Job' college events sponsored by Dove and Cosmopolitan Magazine. Todd was also nominated in the category of Choice TV Reality/Variety Star - Female for the 2005 Teen Choice Awards. Todd was a recap writer on NBC.com for the earlier episodes of The Apprentice: Martha Stewart. She also appeared in an infomercial for Billy Blanks' new Tae-Bo exercise program, "Billy's Bootcamp: Elite".

On June 25, 2009, Kendra Todd was named spokesperson for identity theft prevention services company Guard Dog, Inc. On July 22, 2009, Kendra Todd was named spokesperson for DYMO's newly launched LabelWriter 450. In 2009, Todd was sued for fraud and breach of fiduciary duty in Florida. The case was mediated and settled in early 2010 and never went to court.

Todd speaks openly about her Christian beliefs. She occasionally speaks at churches and appeared on The 700 Club with Pat Robertson and discussed the real estate market. According to that show's biography of her, Todd says "I'm a strong Christian, and I'm getting ready to launch a Christian biblical-based approach to making and saving money, tithing and giving," she says. "I am getting ready to do what I am passionate about. I want to empower people to create a real positive relationship with and perspective on money, and realize it's all God." Since then, she has launched a blog site for Kingdom Entrepreneurs, entitled Grow Rich God's Way

In September 2010, Fox News analyzed the performance of Kendra Todd and other Apprentice winners, and wrote that "When you look at the roster of former 'Apprentice' winners, it appears The Donald is better at choosing future reality show hosts and camera chasers than he is at finding people who can actually run companies", and that "Most turned out to be chumps". Despite their analysis, Fox News continues to feature Kendra Todd as a real estate contributor on both the Fox News Channel and Fox Business Network, and has done so since 2005.

== Television career ==
From 2006 to 2008, Todd was a guest co-host and money expert on several episodes of The Montel Williams Show.

From 2006 to 2009, Todd was the host of My House Is Worth What? on HGTV. Todd filmed more than 200 episodes of the popular show, and TIME magazine profiled Todd and her show in their June 25, 2007 issue and wrote on page 60 that "The most mercenary, and irresistible, "Property Buzz" show is My House Is Worth What?. The show was in production from 2006 to 2009 and no new episodes are planned, according to the producers, Pie Town Productions.

Todd is an occasional Fox News real estate contributor, and from time to time appears on shows on both the Fox News Channel and Fox Business Network. These appearances date back to 2005.

== Real Estate career ==
Kendra Todd began her real estate in 2003, and currently holds real estate broker licenses in the states of Florida and Washington. She was a 2005 honoree of the "Top 30 Under 30" Award presented each year by REALTOR Magazine to 30 rising stars in the real estate industry.

On March 25, 2009, Todd joined Keller Williams Realty, according to a Keller Williams press release. In 2009, Todd co-founded The Kendra Todd Group with fellow real estate broker Stacey Brower. The company has a presence in both Seattle, WA and southern Florida.

== Writing accomplishments ==
Todd has coauthored a book (with Charles Andrews), Risk and Grow Rich. In a May 28, 2006 book review of Risk & Grow Rich, The Los Angeles Times called Todd 'An Apprentice wise beyond her years" and wrote that the book itself has "bits of pearly wisdom."

From 2005 to 2006, Todd was a Yahoo Real Estate columnist. In September 2006, Todd wrote in a Yahoo Real Estate article, "You can't go anywhere without hearing people talk about 'the real estate bubble.' Such talk drives me to distraction, and I'll tell you why. It's because there is no real estate bubble. Bubbles are for bathtubs." In the Fall 2007 issue of USAA Magazine, an article titled "Real (Estate) page turners" quotes Todd: "Ms. Todd disagrees with those who say there has been a bust for real estate. 'What's dropped in some areas is market expectations more than market values,' she argues."

Preceded by Kelly Perdew	The Apprentice Winners; Season 3	Succeeded by Randal Pinkett
