= Erin Scavino =

American model, attorney (born 1978/1979)

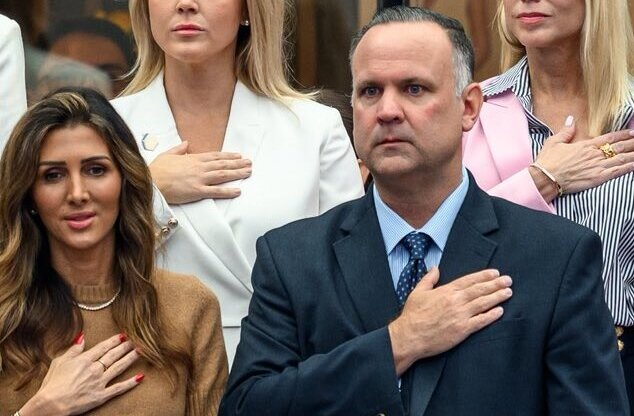
- Erin (Elmore) Scavino and Dan Scavino, U.S. Open on Sept. 7, 2025.
- Born: Erin Maryn Elmore; 1978 or 1979 (age 47–48), Hershey, Pennsylvania, US
- Education: University of Miami (BA); Villanova University (JD)
- Occupations: Public official, attorney, political activist, television personality
- Spouses: Craig M. Spitzer (m. 2012; div. 2024); Dan Scavino (m. 2026)
- Children: 1
- Modeling information
- Height: 5 ft 7 in (170 cm)
- Hair color: Dark brown
- Eye color: Dark brown

Director of Art in Embassies
- Incumbent
- Assumed office 2025
- President: Donald Trump
- Preceded by: Megan Beyer
- Website: erinelmore.com

Erin Maryn Scavino (née Elmore; born 1978 or 1979) is an American attorney, former model, reality show contestant and political activist. Since 2025, she has been the director of Art in Embassies at the United States Department of State.

Scavino earned degrees in political science, broadcasting and law. Her early career alternated between working as a lawyer, a model and appearing on television. She appeared on the 2005 season of The Apprentice, a business reality television series hosted by Donald Trump, losing but enhancing her career. When Trump ran for president in 2016, she joined his campaign as a spokesperson, called a surrogate. From 2020 through 2025, she was a writer and speaker for conservative group Turning Point USA, then returned to being a surrogate for Trump's 2024 presidential campaign. After Trump was elected in 2025, he appointed her the Director of Art in Embassies.

== Early life ==
Erin Maryn Elmore was born in Hershey, Pennsylvania, in 1978 or 1979, the daughter of Peggy and James Elmore. She grew up in Peters Township, where her father worked as an oral surgeon. Her younger sister Ashley became a teacher and a contestant on the 2010 season of The Bachelor and Bachelor Pad reality television programs.

Elmore attended Peters Township High School, where she was a varsity cheerleader and wrote for newspapers. She also worked as a lifeguard and a professional model. She was a semi-finalist in the Miss Pennsylvania USA beauty pageant. After graduating from high school, she earned a degree in political science and broadcasting at the University of Miami, then came to Philadelphia in 2000, where she got a Juris Doctor degree from Villanova University School of Law in 2003.

== Early career ==
Elmore worked for six months as a corporate lawyer in Center City, Philadelphia, before deciding to resume modeling with the goal of possibly going into television journalism. She put up a web site selling autographed photos, joined a talent agency with her mother acting as her agent.

Elmore appeared on the 2005 season of The Apprentice business reality television series, hosted by Donald Trump. She was described as a "model-lawyer". She started in January and was eliminated ("fired") by Trump on the March 24 episode. Despite losing, the appearance enhanced her career: by April of that year, she had done 20 local and national television interviews, including Entertainment Tonight, The Dennis Miller Show, Fox, MSNBC and NBC, and modeled representing Metro Newspapers and Denim Lounge. Then she worked as a television reporter for WTLV's First Coast News in Jacksonville, Florida.

From 2009 through 2012, Elmore worked at the Philadelphia office of U.S. Legal Support, a provider of litigation services. Concurrently, and through at least 2017, Elmore appeared as an on-air host for the QVC home shopping television network.

== Political career ==
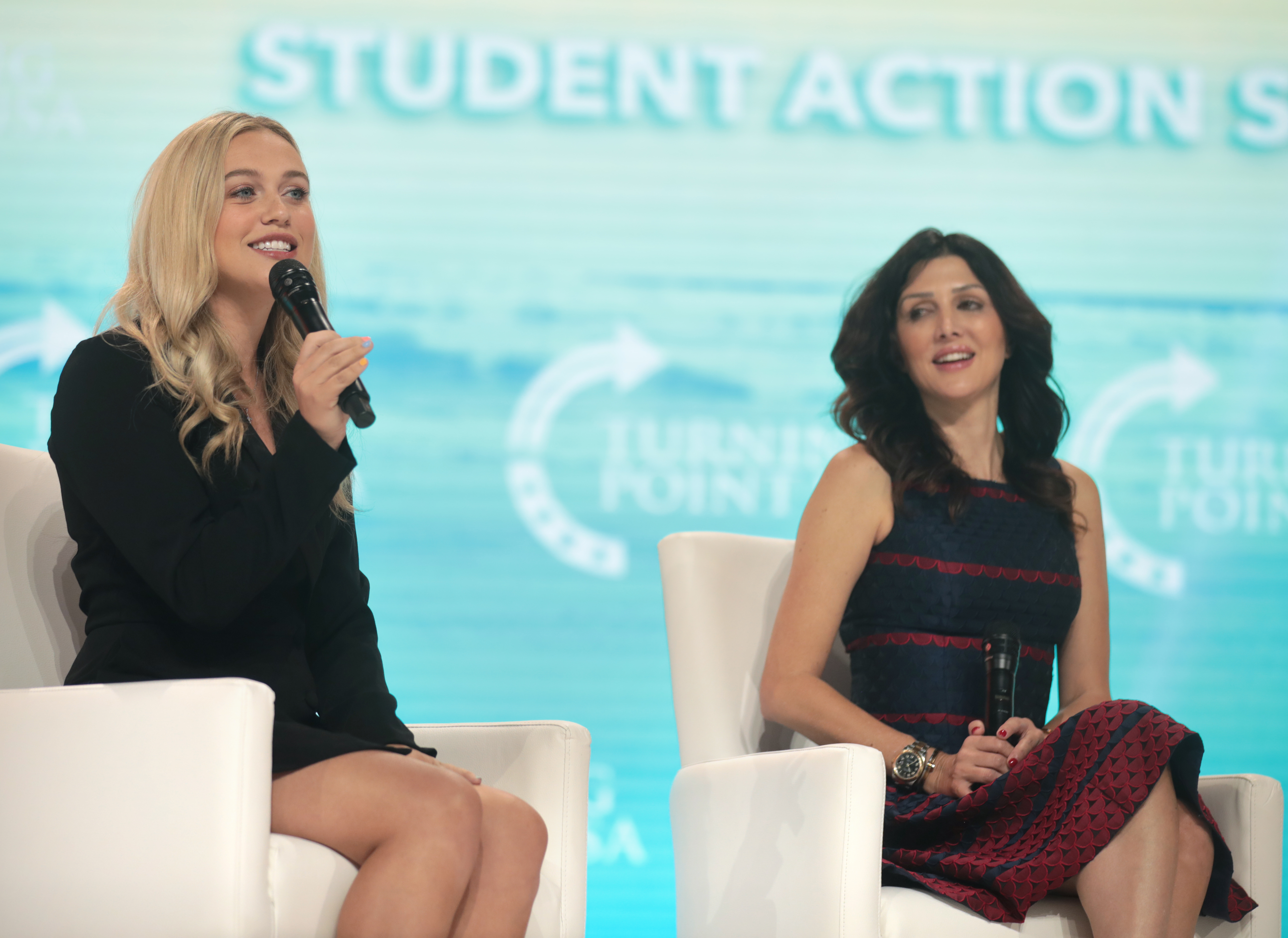
Elmore (right) with Isabel Brown at the 2021 Student Action Summit

In 2016, Elmore worked as a spokesperson, called a surrogate, for the Donald Trump 2016 presidential campaign. For a few days, she was named as deputy press secretary for the 2016 Republican National Convention, but returned to being a Trump surrogate before the convention. However, she and her husband supported Democrat Katie McGinty in the 2016 United States Senate election in Pennsylvania. In 2017, Elmore considered a run for Lieutenant Governor of Pennsylvania.

From 2020 through 2025, Elmore was a contributor for conservative political organization Turning Point USA, writing over 1000 articles for their site and speaking at their Student Action Summit or Young Women's Leadership Summit for each year. In 2021, she worked for the Logan Circle Group of Washington D.C. political consultants and on their behalf wrote emails threatening litigation against reporters writing about scandals connected to Florida congressman Matt Gaetz.

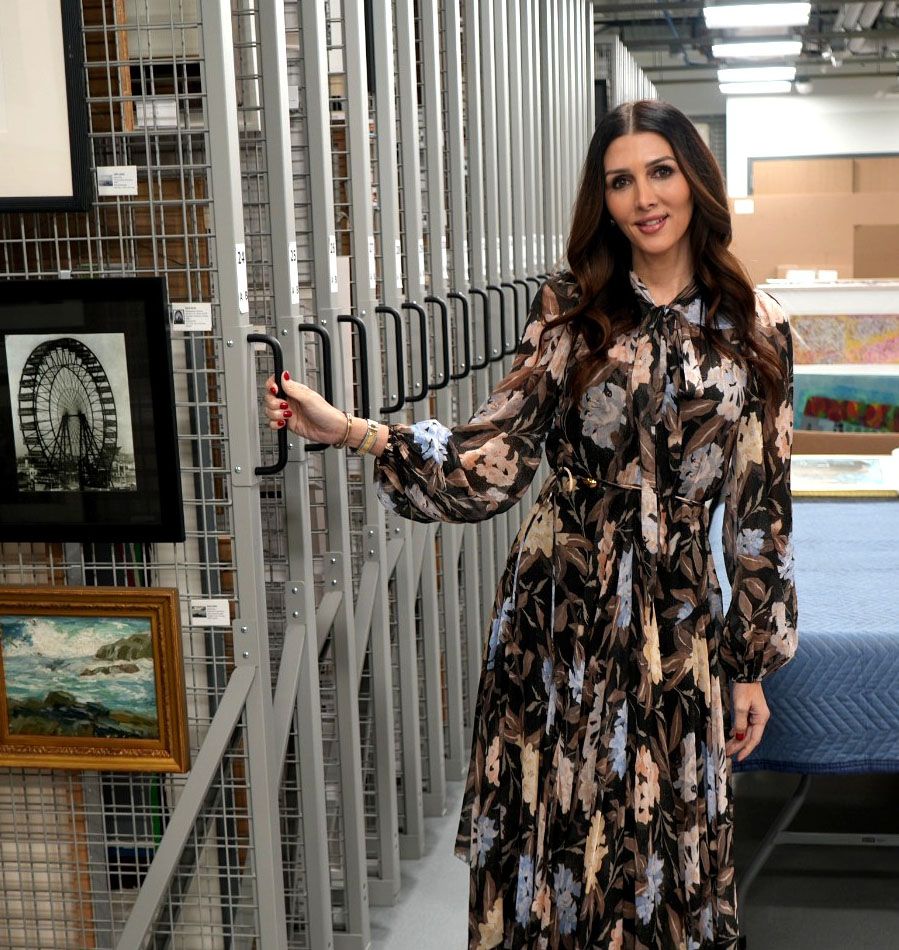
As Director of Art in Embassies in 2025

Elmore returned to being a surrogate for the Donald Trump 2024 presidential campaign. She joined Lara Trump and Danica Patrick traveling the country for the Team Trump's Women's Tour.

In 2025, after Trump was elected, Elmore was appointed the Director of Art in Embassies in the United States Department of State. This was a controversial position, called the use of American art as a tool for diplomacy by Elmore and supporters, opposed as a waste of government funds by conservatives including Representatives Tim Burchett, Brian Mast (from her adopted home district in Florida) and website RealClearInvestigations. In early 2026, she said that she used her position to contribute to the firing of two ambassadors based on their art choices, including Kathleen A. Kavalec, former United States ambassador to Romania, who displayed a collage of babies and a horned skull. In August 2026, she removed a Kehinde Wiley painting of four Dominican models from the embassy in the Dominican Republic, explaining that it was "woke", and by the artist of the President Barack Obama portrait. From July to October 2026, as part of the United States Semiquincentennial, she organized a "Passport to Patriotism: 250 Years of Diplomacy" exhibit of embassy art at the Art Museum of the Americas.

== Personal life ==
In October 2012, Elmore married businessman Craig M. Spitzer, but continued to use her maiden name. She converted to Judaism for her husband, so their son could be born Jewish; he was born in 2013. They were married through 2024.

By 2021, Elmore left Philadelphia for Jupiter, Florida, not far from Trump's Mar-a-Lago resort. There, she co-hosted multiple fundraisers for Big Dog Ranch Rescue with Lara Trump.

After her divorce, and soon after Trump's victory in the 2024 United States presidential election, Elmore met newly appointed deputy chief of staff Dan Scavino, first over direct messages, then in person as she showed him around the area near Mar-a-Lago for the presidential transition. In September 2025, Scavino proposed to Elmore on the White House grounds, in a video the couple posted on their Instagram accounts. They married in February 2026 at Mar-a-Lago, in a wedding attended by Elon Musk, the President, many members of his family, cabinet and staff. After the marriage, she used her husband's last name.
