= Edi Karni =

Israeli-American economist

- עדי קרני
- Born: March 20, 1944 (age 82); Tel Aviv, Israel
- Citizenship: Israel
- Education: The University of Chicago
- Scientific career
- Fields: Economics
- Doctoral advisor: Milton Friedman; Gary Becker; Stanley Fischer

Edi Karni (Hebrew: עדי קרני; born March 20, 1944, in Tel Aviv) is an Israeli born American economist and decision theorist. Karni is the Scott and Barbara Black Professor of Economics at Johns Hopkins University. He is a Fellow of the Econometric Society and an Economic Theory Fellow of the Society for the Advancement of Economic Theory.

He earned his B.A. in Economics and Political Science from The Hebrew University of Jerusalem, in 1965 and his Ph.D. from The University of Chicago, in 1971, under the supervision of Milton Friedman, Gary Becker and Stanley Fischer. Karni began his academic career at Tel Aviv University in 1972, where he attained the rank of full professor. In 1976-77 he was a fellow at the Institute of Advanced Studies at the Hebrew University of Jerusalem. In 1982 he left Tel Aviv University for Johns Hopkins University. In the years 2013-2019 Karni was Distinguished professor at the Warwick Business School.

Karni's main contributions are in the fields of individual decision making under uncertainty, social choice theory and the economics of information.

In the field of decision-making under uncertainty, he has worked on the measurement of risk aversion, the modeling state-dependent preferences and the definition of subjective probability, the modeling of awareness and awareness of unawareness and the introduction of the notion of ‘reverse Bayesianism’. In the field of economics of information, Karni's contribution include the introduction of the notion of credence-quality goods and the explanation of the existence of fraud in competitive market to asymmetric information due to expert knowledge. In the field of social choice theory Karni's contributions include the axiomatization and representation of individual behavior that is motivated, in part, by a sense of fairness and interpersonal comparisons of variations in well-being.
