= Luke Broadwater =

American journalist

Luke Broadwater is an American journalist. He is a White House correspondent for The New York Times.

Broadwater was member of the reporting team for The Baltimore Sun that won the 2020 Pulitzer Prize for Local Reporting for a series on the Healthy Holly scandal.

In 2025, Broadwater and Annie Karni published the book Mad House: How Donald Trump, Maga Mean Girls, a Former Used Car Salesman, a Florida Nepo Baby, and a Man with Rats in His Walls Broke Congress.
