= Big Dog Ranch Rescue =

American dog rescue shelter

- Formation: 2008
- Founder: Lauree Simmons
- Headquarters: Loxahatchee, Florida
- Services: Dog rescue and adoption, service dog training
- Chairwoman: Lara Trump
- Website: bdrr.org

Big Dog Ranch Rescue is the largest, cage-free no kill dog rescue in the United States. It is located in Loxahatchee, Florida.

== History ==
Big Dog Ranch Rescue (BDRR) was founded in 2008 in Loxahatchee, Florida, by founder and CEO Lauree Simmons. The shelter rescues dogs from all over the country and helps to rehabilitate and rehome them. BDDR also provides education to the general public on responsible pet ownership, safe breeding, and advocates for spaying and neutering.

In 2022, BDRR purchased a 100 acre former greyhound facility in Alabama and opened a second rescue facility. The facility provides medical care and arranges adoptions for dogs from the states of Alabama, Georgia, Kentucky, Louisiana, Mississippi, South Carolina, Tennessee, and Texas.

== Veteran Service Dog Training Program ==
The organization works with veteran's organizations to match veterans with rescue dogs from their service dog training program. They also offer free boarding for deployed service members. Evan Fried is the director of the veteran dog training program and, since its inception, 190 veterans have been matched to service dogs.

In 2026, BDRR opened a new $4 million, 18,000 square foot building in order to expand the veteran program.

== Fundraising and events ==
BDRR operate entirely on donations. Since 2018, Lara Trump has served as the chairwoman and has organized many charity events at the Mar-a-Largo resort in Palm Beach, Florida. An event in 2025 raised $4.3 million for the organization and had guest appearance by President Donald Trump and Elon Musk.

In 2025, Florida Governor Ron DeSantis signed two bills at BDRR that increase penalties for animal cruelty crimes.
