= The Apprentice (American TV series) season 2 =

The Apprentice
- Season 2
- No. of contestants: 18
- Winner: Kelly Perdew
- Runner-up: Jennifer Massey
- No. of episodes: 15

Release
- Original network: NBC
- Original release: September 9 – December 16, 2004

Additional information
- Filming dates: May 2004 – June 2004

Season chronology
- ← Previous; Season 1 Next → Season 3

The Apprentice 2 is the second season of The Apprentice, which began on September 9, 2004, on NBC. Although this season did not match the ratings of the first and dropped out of the Top 10 Nielsen, it still performed strongly overall, ranking No. 11 with an average of 16.14 million viewers.

== Season changes ==
This season featured 18 candidates, whereas the first season only had 16.

Three new twists were introduced to The Apprentice this season. First, each team was unexpectedly forced at the season's outset to make a 1-for-1 player swap, resulting in a male on the female team (Bradford), and a female on the male team (Pamela). The traded members then became the project managers for the first task. Second, it was revealed that a project manager for the winning team would be immune from being fired the following week, even though in the season's second episode Bradford Cohen decided to waive his exemption that he got on the episode prior and was subsequently fired for making that ill-advised decision.

Finally, the losing project manager could choose either two or three people to bring to the boardroom to be considered for firing. The option to take three people to the boardroom was only used twice, with the first person (Ivana Ma) who did so making the decision after pressure to do so from Donald Trump.

== The candidates ==
=== Teams ===
Team 1	Team 2
Apex	Mosaic

Candidate	Background	Original team	Age	Hometown	Result
Kelly Perdew	Software executive	Mosaic	37	Carlsbad, California	Hired by Trump (12-16-2004)
Jennifer Massey	Attorney	Apex	30	San Francisco, California	Fired in the season finale (12-16-2004)
Sandy Ferreira	Bridal salon owner	Apex	28	Rockville, Maryland	Fired in week 14^{2} (12-9-2004)
Kevin Allen	Law student	Mosaic	29	Chicago, Illinois	Fired in week 14 (12-9-2004)
Ivana Ma	Venture capitalist	Apex	28	Boston, Massachusetts	Fired in week 13 (12-2-2004)
Andy Litinsky	Recent Harvard graduate	Mosaic	22	Boca Raton, Florida	Fired in week 12 (11-25-2004)
Wes Moss	Private wealth manager	Mosaic	28	Atlanta, Georgia	Fired in week 11^{1} (11-18-2004)
Maria Boren	Marketing executive	Apex	31	Virginia Beach, Virginia	Fired in week 11 (11-18-2004)
Chris Russo	Stockbroker	Mosaic	30	Long Island, New York	Fired in week 10 (11-11-2004)
Raj Bhakta	Real estate developer	Mosaic	28	Philadelphia, Pennsylvania	Fired in week 9 (11-4-2004)
Elizabeth Jarosz	Consulting firm owner	Apex	31	Marina del Ray, California	Fired in week 8 (10-28-2004)
Stacy Rotner	Attorney	Apex	26	New York, New York	Fired in week 7 (10-21-2004)
John Willenborg	Marketing director	Mosaic	24	San Francisco, California	Fired in week 6 (10-14-2004)
Pamela Day	Investment firm partner	Mosaic	32	San Francisco, California	Fired in week 5 (10-7-2004)
Jennifer Crisafulli	Real estate agent	Apex	31	New York, New York	Fired in week 4 (9-29-2004)
Stacie Jones Upchurch	Restaurateur	Apex	35	New York, New York	Fired in week 3 (9-23-2004)
Bradford Cohen	Attorney	Apex	33	Fort Lauderdale, Florida	Fired in week 2 (9-16-2004)
Rob Flanagan	Corporate branding salesman	Mosaic	32	Frisco, Texas	Fired in week 1 (9-9-2004)

^{1} – In an unannounced move, Trump fired two candidates week 11. Boren was fired first.
^{2} – As planned, Trump fired two candidates week 14. Allen was fired first.

== Weekly results ==
Candidate	Week 1 team	Week 5 team	Week 7 team	Week 11 team	Week 12 team	Final week team	Application result	Record as project manager
Kelly Perdew	Mosaic	Mosaic	Mosaic	Apex	Apex	Apex	Hired by Trump	3–0 (win in weeks 2, 10, & 12)
Jennifer Massey	Apex	Apex	Apex	Apex	Mosaic	Mosaic	Fired in the Season Finale	1–0 (win in week 7)
Sandy Ferreira	Apex	Apex	Mosaic	Mosaic	Mosaic		Fired in week 14	2–0 (win in weeks 9 & 13)
Kevin Allen	Mosaic	Mosaic	Apex	Apex	Apex		Fired in week 14	2–0 (win in weeks 3 & 11)
Ivana Ma	Apex	Apex	Apex	Apex	Apex		Fired in week 13	0–2 (loss in weeks 2 & 13)
Andy Litinsky	Mosaic	Mosaic	Mosaic	Mosaic	Mosaic		Fired in week 12	1–1 (win in week 8, loss in week 12)
Wesley Moss	Mosaic	Mosaic	Mosaic	Mosaic			Fired in week 11	0–2 (loss in weeks 7 & 11)
Maria Boren	Apex	Apex	Mosaic	Mosaic			Fired in week 11	1–0 (win in week 6)
Chris Russo	Mosaic	Mosaic	Apex			Mosaic	Fired in week 10	1–1 (win in week 5, loss in week 10)
Raj Bhakta	Mosaic	Mosaic	Apex			Apex	Fired in week 9	1–1 (win in week 4, loss in week 9)
Elizabeth Jarosz	Apex	Apex	Apex			Apex	Fired in week 8	0–2 (loss in weeks 3 & 8)
Stacy Rotner	Apex	Apex	Mosaic			Mosaic	Fired in week 7	
John Willenborg	Mosaic	Mosaic				Apex	Fired in week 6	0–1 (loss in week 6)
Pamela Day	Mosaic	Apex				Mosaic	Fired in week 5	0–2 (loss in weeks 1 & 5)
Jennifer Crisafulli	Apex						Fired in week 4	0–1 (loss in week 4)
Stacie Jones Upchurch	Apex						Fired in week 3	
Bradford Cohen	Apex						Fired in week 2	1–0 (win in week 1)
Rob Flanagan	Mosaic						Fired in week 1	

== Elimination Table ==
Elimination chart
No.	Candidate	1	2	3	4	5	6	7	8	9	10	11	12	13	14	15
1	Kelly	IN	WIN	IN	IN	IN	IN	IN	IN	IN	WIN	IN	WIN	BR	ADV	HIRED
2	Jennifer M.	IN	IN	IN	IN	IN	IN	WIN	IN	IN	IN	IN	BR	IN	ADV	FIRED
3	Sandy	IN	IN	IN	IN	IN	IN	IN	IN	WIN	IN	BR	BR	WIN	FIRED	
4	Kevin	IN	IN	WIN	IN	IN	BR	IN	IN	BR	BR	WIN	IN	BR	FIRED	
5	Ivana	IN	LOSE	IN	IN	IN	IN	IN	IN	BR	BR	IN	IN	FIRED		
6	Andy	BR	IN	IN	IN	IN	BR	BR	WIN	IN	IN	BR	FIRED			
7	Wes	IN	IN	IN	IN	IN	IN	LOSE	IN	IN	IN	FIRED				
8	Maria	IN	IN	BR	IN	BR	WIN	IN	IN	IN	IN	FIRED				
9	Chris	IN	IN	IN	IN	WIN	IN	IN	IN	IN	FIRED					
10	Raj	IN	IN	IN	WIN	IN	IN	IN	IN	FIRED						
11	Elizabeth	IN	IN	LOSE	BR	IN	IN	IN	FIRED							
12	Stacy R.	IN	IN	IN	BR	BR	IN	FIRED								
13	John	IN	IN	IN	IN	IN	FIRED									
14	Pamela	LOSE	IN	IN	IN	FIRED										
15	Jennifer C.	IN	BR	IN	FIRED											
16	Stacie J.	IN	BR	FIRED												
17	Bradford	WIN	FIRED													
18	Rob	FIRED														

The candidate was on the losing team.
The candidate was hired and won the competition.
The candidate won as project manager on his/her team.
The candidate lost as project manager on his/her team.
The candidate was brought to the final boardroom.
The candidate was fired.
The candidate lost as project manager and was fired.

== Weekly summary ==
=== Week 1: Toying with Disaster ===
- Air date: September 9, 2004
- Apex project manager: Bradford
- Mosaic project manager: Pamela
- Task: Develop a new toy for Mattel. The product deemed most viable would be the winner.
- Judges: Donald Trump; Carolyn Kepcher; George H. Ross
- Trump monologue: Be Quick But Be Careful – To be quick and not careful is a bad decision. Trump prefers when his employees carefully take their time and make the right decision; but a good decision made quickly is the best combination.
- Result: The team with mostly men (Mosaic) developed a line of mutated animal Transformers called "Crustacean Nation". The team with mostly women (Apex) developed a radio controlled car called the "Meta-morpher" with parts that interchange.
- Winning Team: Apex
  - Reasons for win: The Mattel executives felt that Apex's product was more innovative, and would generate more money over time due to potential sales of add-on packs containing new parts.
  - Reward: Dinner with Trump and Melania Knauss.
- Dramatic tension: When deciding on corporation names, Raj clearly disliked his team's name (Mosaic), as he wanted to name the team "Empire," and thought Mosaic was a "fruity toot" name; the name was also criticized by Trump. Trump was also puzzled that Raj decided to carry a cane during the first task. On Apex, Bradford struggled to fit in with his otherwise all-female team, and Stacie J. completely alienated the members of her team during the wait before a winning team was decided. On Mosaic, Pamela makes fun of the weight and haircuts of the children in the focus group, which offended Carolyn.
- Losing Team: Mosaic
  - Reasons for loss: Trump felt that their toy was generic and lacked a unique selling point, and that their presentation was inferior to Apex's.
- Sent to boardroom: Pamela, Rob, Andy
  - Firing Verdict:
    - Several team members claimed that Rob did not contribute as much as he could have, but Rob claimed he was underutilized. He also curtly cut off Carolyn in the boardroom when she interrupted him to ask a question.
    - Although he came up with the "Crustacean Nation" concept, Andy insisted that he was brought into the final boardroom simply because of his youth.
    - Ultimately Trump was not impressed with Rob feeling he could've contributed even though he wasn't asked and decided he would be the first to be fired
- Fired: Rob Flanagan – for not being assertive in the task, not coming forward with his ideas, and being very disrespectful towards Carolyn. While Pamela led the team to defeat with the poor presentation, and he questioned Andy's youth, he felt both had potential and decided Rob's failure to step up and contribute along with his poor enthusiasm were enough to justify his dismissal.
- Notes:
  - On September 14, 2004, Mattel announced that they would produce the winning toy under the name Morph Machines. It debuted in early 2005 at a retail price of $30.
  - Episode One Recap at NBC.com
  - Read the Episode 1 Recap at Yahoo!'s Apprentice 2 Website

=== Week 2: Scoop Dreams ===
- Air date: September 16, 2004 (a special 2-hour cut later aired on September 18)
- Apex project manager: Ivana
- Mosaic project manager: Kelly
- Task: Create, develop and market a new flavor of ice cream with the Ciao Bella Gelato Company for the Trump Ice Cream Parlour.
- Judges: Donald Trump; Carolyn Kepcher; George H. Ross
- Trump Monologue: Get Organized – A lack of organization is a lack of leadership and without leadership, success is impossible.
- Result: Mosaic developed a flavor made of various types of doughnuts. Apex's flavor was based on Red velvet cake.
- Dramatic tension: Although both teams initially struggled to find a place to market their ice cream, Mosaic made a critical error when they left their business plan in the open for Apex to read. Pamela irritated her teammates asking too many questions about the ice cream production, and then with a lackluster sales performance. The men also struggled dealing with John, after he demanded that the team forgo any sort of lunch or snack breaks so that they could sell ice cream all day and not spend any profit. When Raj stated that he had hypoglycemia, which would be grievously aggravated by not eating anything during the day, John started yelling at Raj, accusing him of being lazy and making up excuses. Kelly then told the team that every man would get $5 to buy some food during the day, and when John tried to argue against this, Kelly simply told him "Got it. It's noted," and then gave everyone (including John) the petty cash.
- Winning Team: Mosaic
  - Reasons for win: They made almost $250 more than the other team. Although they had to buy their own ingredients (namely doughnuts), they opted to give a portion to the Leukemia-Lymphoma Society as a marketing gimmick, which successfully boosted their sales. Kelly also selected a good location, which was near the Times Square branch of Toys "R" Us (the briefing location in the previous task), because he remembered Trump describing it as the country's busiest toy store. Raj also suggested that the men wear bowties in the style of old-fashioned ice cream men. After they won, project manager Kelly asked Trump if their entire winnings could be donated to the charity, to which Trump agreed.
- Reward: Dinner at the Petrossian
- Losing Team: Apex
  - Reasons for loss: Apex started somewhat later than Mosaic, and were forced to move from their original sales location near the TKTS center when existing street vendors demanded to see their permit (it was not clear that they actually needed one for the task). In the process, Apex became separated, and their carts lost contact with each other for several hours. Apex tried to bring the carts back together, but Stacie J. misidentified their location as the junction with 7th Avenue, when they were actually standing at the junction with Broadway. Though they eventually got the carts back together, and Jennifer C. made a bulk sale to a restaurant near the end of the day, the time lost when the carts were separated ultimately proved too much to overcome.
- Initial Boardroom: Ivana was castigated for her disorganization and loose leadership. Bradford mispronounced Carolyn's name, which visibly irked her. Ivana stated that Stacie J. was responsible for losing the cart for as long as they did and that she needed supervision. George was puzzled that the team couldn't see each other, as 7th Avenue and Broadway are only half a block apart. Trump asked Bradford to be frank about Ivana's performance, noting that he was the only person in a position to do so, thanks to his immunity. This led to Bradford offering to waive his exemption, and he stated that because he felt like he performed to the best of his abilities, he did not need his immunity. Even though Apex collectively agreed that Ivana was a poor leader, they unanimously decided that Stacie J. presented a bigger liability.
- Sent to boardroom: Ivana, Stacie J., Jennifer C., and Bradford. Ivana selected Jennifer C. and Bradford to go into the boardroom so they could advocate against Stacie J., and believed that because they had been the strongest performers on the task, this would give Trump no choice but to fire Stacie.
  - Firing Verdict:
    - While Bradford was happy to advocate for Ivana, Jennifer C. became angry at being brought back, and focused most of her criticism on Ivana rather than Stacie.
    - Trump didn't like Ivana's indecision, particularly about which contestants she would bring to the boardroom.
    - Trump also felt that Jennifer C. should not have been brought to the boardroom, given her help in securing sales, but became annoyed, and considered firing her, when she repeatedly interjected.
    - Overall, Trump was especially concerned with Bradford (whom he explicitly identified as the strongest contestant in the final boardroom), and that his impulsive decision outweighed Ivana's bad leadership, Jennifer's interruptions, and Stacie not working well with the team, because Trump believed that Bradford would be able to instantly destroy a business with a careless decision such as his.
- Fired: Bradford Cohen – for his rash decision to waive his exemption and volunteering to come back to the Final Boardroom, despite being deemed the strongest in the boardroom. Trump felt that Bradford's mistake was worse than any other mistake made (i.e. the flavor of ice cream).
- Notes:
  - Bradford became the first candidate to ever leave Trump Tower without his luggage, not having packed his bags due to his exemption. He presumably received his luggage from crew members sometime after his firing.
  - As a result of his firing, Bradford has the dubious honor of lasting the shortest amount of time of any successful first-episode project manager (in any incarnation of the show).
  - Despite her error over the cart's location, Trump did not hold Stacie J. accountable for the loss, and heavily implied that Ivana would have been fired had Bradford not surrendered his immunity, as Carolyn repeatedly criticized Ivana's leadership.
  - Episode Two recap at NBC.com
  - Read the Episode 2 Recap at Yahoo!'s Apprentice 2 Website

=== Week 3: Send in the Crowns ===
- Air date: September 23, 2004
- Prologue: There was a massive argument among the women before the task even began, with Maria, Ivana, Sandy and Stacy R. openly telling Stacie J. that they considered her mentally unstable and did not wish to continue working with her. Elizabeth and both the Jennifers did not question Stacie J.'s state of mind, but still considered her the weakest on the team.
- Apex project manager: Elizabeth
- Mosaic project manager: Kevin
- Task: Develop a launch promotion for Crest's newest flavor of toothpaste. Each team has a budget of $50,000, and the winner will be chosen by executives from Procter & Gamble, Crest's parent company.
- Judges: Donald Trump; Carolyn Kepcher; George H. Ross
- Trump Monologue A Penny Saved is a Penny Saved – Trump is basically quite critical of the budget that is set. This could possibly be a typo, because the saying is typically A Penny Saved is a Penny Earned.
- Dramatic tension: Stacie J. did little to help win over her teammates when she suggested giving away over a thousand tubes of toothpaste, only for it to turn out that this amount was far more than they could feasibly carry, forcing them to spend much of the morning of their event transporting it to their location. On Mosaic, Andy came up with an idea to purchase an insurance policy for a million dollar giveaway, intending to set the giveaway up so that in all likelihood nobody would win, but that the policy would protect them in case anyone did. However, Procter & Gamble forbade Mosaic to have the giveaway, saying that there were too many legal problems. The team were forced to come up with a new idea at the last minute, and a dejected Andy realized he would almost certainly be fired if the team lost.
- Result: Apex selects Mike Piazza to endorse the toothpaste at a cost of $20,000. Mosaic, after an abortive attempt to have a million dollar contest, gives away several smaller $5,000 prizes, with circus performers entertaining the crowds.
- Winning Team: Mosaic
  - Reasons for win: The Procter & Gamble executives felt that Mosaic's event was actually inferior to Apex's, and that it lacked any big idea or central theme. Despite this, the event still went well and raised enough buzz that, combined with Apex's fatal blunder, the team were still awarded the win.
  - Reward: Dinner on RMS Queen Mary 2
- Losing Team: Apex
  - Reasons for loss: Despite feeling that Apex clearly had the better event (mostly due to Piazza's involvement), the team made a fatal error by exceededing their budget by over $5,000, which the executives felt was too much for them to be awarded the win. Elizabeth blamed Maria because of her sloppy contract negotiations, which allowed the company in charge of producing their publicity material to invoke an overtime clause and inflated their original $1,850 estimate to a final price of $6,950.
- Sent to boardroom: All of Apex. – Initially Elizabeth chose Maria and Stacie J. for the Final Boardroom, but Trump became concerned with Apex's feelings concerning Stacie. He called everyone from Apex back to the boardroom to discuss their feelings about Stacie J.'s behavior during the first task.
- Firing Verdict:
  - At first, Trump didn't understand why Ivana was not brought back into the boardroom, because she was responsible for monitoring the budget and only allotted $500 (1 percent of the total budget) for overspend, which wasn't nearly enough to handle a major budgetary crisis. Elizabeth disagreed and said that Maria and Stacie J. were both more responsible for the loss than Ivana (although Elizabeth had the opportunity to bring Ivana back).
  - Trump felt that Elizabeth was a poor leader for not even knowing Apex had exceeded their budget until the task result was announced, and that Maria should have taken accountability for the bad deal she made.
  - Trump asked why Stacie J. was brought back, and Maria then brought up the incident with Stacie J. in the first task and how everyone on the team was very frightened by it resulting in Trump requesting all of Apex to come to the Final Boardroom.
  - When All of Apex brought back, all the women agreed that Stacie J. acted very odd, Ivana went as far as calling Stacie J.'s actions "borderline schizophrenic," and Sandy and Stacy R. in particular viciously attacked Stacie J., saying they didn't feel comfortable being in the same room as her and would not even trust her with menial work.
  - Although Stacie J. insisted that she wasn't crazy, and Jennifer M. pointed out that Stacie hadn't displayed any more strange behavior in the previous two tasks, Trump told her that something must have happened because her entire team was concerned with her behavior.
- Fired: Stacie Jones Upchurch – for being a distraction within her team and due to fears that she is mentally unstable based on her behavior from the first task and Apex's reaction to it. Although Elizabeth was a poor leader and Maria made a horrible deal with Mike Piazza, Trump didn't want to have someone who is out of control working for The Trump Organization.
- Notes:
  - For the first time in the American version of The Apprentice, the entire team is called back into the boardroom by Trump.
  - Episode Three recap at NBC.com
  - Read the Episode 3 Recap at Yahoo!'s Apprentice 2 Website

=== Week 4: The Last Supper ===
- Air date: September 29
- Prologue: Kevin and Raj, along with Jennifer M., lambasted the women for their treatment of Stacie J., and Elizabeth is attacked for choosing her to go to the boardroom in the previous episode, much to Elizabeth's annoyance, as she had actually brought Stacie back for wasting the team's time with the bulk delivery, rather than her past behavior despite being told consistently that was not why they lost.
- Apex project manager: Jennifer C.
- Mosaic project manager: Raj
- Task: Open a new restaurant in 24 hours. Each team would be given an empty space in Manhattan. They would be responsible for chef selection, decor and stocking the restaurant. The winner would be the team that scored the highest on the Zagat Survey of customers.
- Judges: Donald Trump; Carolyn Kepcher; Bill Rancic
- Result: Apex chose an Asian fusion theme while Mosaic went with standard American.
- Trump Monologue: Be Respected – There are several varied traits of a leader, however respect is the common trait in all of them, without respect one can not be a leader.
- Dramatic tension: Stacy R. and Jennifer M. met with Zagat's people beforehand and tried to convince Jennifer C. that going with the complicated Asian fusion concept was a bad idea, but Jennifer C. stuck with it anyway. Apex continued to struggle throughout the task, and Elizabeth even had a breakdown when she felt that she was being set up for failure. Stacy R. took offense at Jennifer C.'s judgment of two Jewish women who were over-critical of their restaurant, and they clashed over this before the boardroom.
- Winning Team: Mosaic
  - Reasons for win: Their restaurant received a very positive review from the survey and a score of 61 points, outscoring Apex in all aspects except, ironically, the actual food. They mostly won out due to the strong scores in the customer service and décor areas.
  - Reward: A meeting with Rudy Giuliani.
- Losing Team: Apex
  - Reasons for loss: They got a score of 57 points, losing by just 4 points, but did particularly worse in the decor and service category than the men did. The women were also reprimanded for the overall appearance, for although they had chic style clothing and a nice modern look to their restaurant, it did not fit with their middle-class locale. Guest judge Bill Rancic also noted that Apex did not have a lot of energy throughout their service and seemed very tense, which the women blamed on Jennifer C's abrasive leadership.
- Sent to boardroom: Jennifer C., Elizabeth, Stacy R.
  - Firing Verdict: Trump felt Apex should have hired a cleaning crew the night before like Mosaic to avoid fatigue the next day. He was also surprised that Sandy was not called back to the boardroom, because she was responsible for the poor design in the restaurant. Jennifer C. was suspected of bringing Elizabeth and Stacy R. mainly for personal reasons, because Trump and his advisors knew that Sandy was primarily responsible for the loss, because she produced the restaurant decor that scored poorly.
- Fired: Jennifer Crisafulli – for her bad leadership and terrible decision making, which included not bringing in Sandy for the boardroom, bringing in Elizabeth and Stacy R. for personal reasons, and for her comments on the Jewish women. Trump saw no reason to fire Elizabeth or Stacy R. and called Jennifer C.'s firing "easy".
- Notes:
  - This episode is moved to this day due to the US presidential debate.
  - Bill Rancic, last season's winner, fills in for George Ross on this task.
  - During the initial boardroom, the women got into a huge argument about many aspects of the tasks, prompting Carolyn to step in a berate them for their unprofessional behavior, especially Jennifer C., who constantly interrupted despite being asked many times. Carolyn would state she was embarrassed as a woman seeing the ladies behave like they did.
  - Jennifer Crisafulli was fired from her job at a real estate agency in Manhattan the day after this episode aired. The firm cited her comments regarding the Jewish women as the reason for her dismissal.
  - When the men were briefing about customer service, it seemed Chris was the only one who had expertise in customer service. He used numerous curse words when talking about how to be a server and told the men he "hates the public" to their laughter. Raj later said he hoped Chris could put his grudge behind him.
  - Episode Four recap at NBC.com
  - Read the Episode 4 Recap at Yahoo!'s Apprentice 2 Website

=== Week 5: Lights! Camera! Transaction! ===
- Airdate: October 7
- Corporate shuffle: Trump sent Pamela over to Apex and he appointed her as the project manager for this task, setting up the "battle of the sexes" once again.
- Apex project manager: Pamela
- Mosaic project manager: Chris
- Task: Select a product from the QVC inventory and sell it on-air. The winner would be the team that has the most gross sales.
- Judges: Donald Trump; Carolyn Kepcher; George H. Ross
- Trump Monologue: Price is Right – The right price is extremely important, if the price is marginally high it can kill the marketed products or restaurant, if it is marginally lower it can do wonders, pricing is very important.
- Result: Apex chose a cleaning product called "It Works!". Mosaic went with a more costly electric sandwich maker.
- Dramatic tension: Pamela begins her leadership of Apex with a speech where she admonishes the team for their behavior, and during her speech, Pamela criticizes them for interrupting and not paying attention to people when they are speaking. Raj and Kelly disagreed over the price of the sandwich maker; Raj argued that setting it at a slightly lower price might lead more people to buy it, but Kelly insisted that it should be sold over the $70 price point. Chris, the project manager, accepted Kelly's idea, and although it annoyed Raj, it was key in getting the victory for Mosaic.
- Winning Team: Mosaic
  - Reasons for win: Mosaic barely squeaked by, winning by only $10, even though they sold far fewer units.
  - Reward: Tennis practice at the Arthur Ashe Stadium with John McEnroe and Anna Kournikova. During the reward, Raj tempts the fates and makes a pass at Anna, who agrees to date him if he can return any of her serves. He fails, and is forced to run around the Arthur Ashe Stadium in his boxers while John, Anna and the rest of the men hit tennis balls at him.
- Losing Team: Apex
  - Reasons for loss: Despite an overall strong effort, the team just fell short. Trump felt that if they had dropped their price a little lower, it would have boosted their sales by enough to carry them to victory.
- Sent to boardroom: Pamela, Stacy R., Maria
  - Firing Verdict: Trump expressed admiration for Pamela for being able to switch over to Apex and become the project manager, but he was also concerned that she couldn't admit she lost. Pamela kept saying it was a tie, but both Trump and his advisors strongly disagreed, and they felt that it was the price of the item which caused Apex to lose. Pamela, however, believed that Apex would have won if their item was priced even higher. Stacey R. also criticized Pamela's laid-back approach to the legal work involved in the task leading to tell Trump, "If you want another Enron on your hands Mr. Trump, here's Pamela."
- Fired: Pamela Day – for her overconfident leadership skills, lack of assessment skills, and for setting the price of the item too high, which ultimately caused her team to fail. Trump also felt that she couldn't admit she was wrong, that she was a poor judge of her team's skills, and assigned them to the wrong jobs.
- Episode Five recap at NBC.com
- Read the Episode 5 Recap at Yahoo!'s Apprentice 2 Website
- This is the fourth week in a row that Apex has lost a task, and the fourth week in a row that Mosaic won a task.

=== Week 6: Crimes of Fashion ===
- Airdate: October 14
- Apex project manager: Maria
- Mosaic project manager: John
- Task: Select a designer, develop a clothing line to present at a fashion show for buyers from several upscale department stores. The team with the highest revenue from orders wins.
- Judges: Donald Trump; Carolyn Kepcher; George H. Ross
- Trump Monologue: Know Your Market – Trump reflects on all his endeavors, and discusses the importance of the demographic the product is catered towards.
- Result: The women's team worked very smoothly, completing the task without any major problems and had a designer who accommodated them by walking them through most of the steps. The men's team floundered throughout the task, partly because their designer was not helpful.
- Dramatic tension: Several women on Apex believed that Elizabeth was a distraction, and Maria had to divert her away from the group in order to get the task done more efficiently. On the men's team, Kelly rose to occasion by organizing the team, even though Raj was slowing the team down and John was the project manager. Mosaic's designer also failed to complete production of the clothes. Part of this was attributed to Raj constantly getting information, wasting time, and leading to an argument with Kelly during completion.
- Winning Team: Apex with $22,060.
  - Reasons for victory: Apex made roughly triple the sales revenue of Mosaic. While their overall execution of the task was virtually flawless, Maria was widely credited as having been the perfect choice to lead the team due to her knowledge of the industry.
  - Reward: A celebrity party with Cirque du Soleil
- Losing Team: Mosaic with only $7,735.
  - Reasons for loss: In stark contrast to the other team, Mosaic's execution of the task was an absolute disaster. The team's products were priced too high and unanimously condemned as unappealing by the buyers due to their fabric choices. John proved an extremely ineffective leader, with Kelly taking more of a leadership role in John's stead.
- Sent to boardroom: John, Kevin, Andy
  - Firing Verdict: Trump felt that Mosaic set their prices too high, which resulted in lower sales. Pricing fell under Kevin and Wes' responsibility, but John chose to let Wes go back to the suite and bring Andy with Kevin instead. This decision baffled Trump and his advisors, especially since John had the option to bring back both Kevin and Wes along with Andy.
- Fired: John Willenborg – for making a variety of fatal mistakes throughout the task as Project Manager/Team Leader, which included choosing a bad designer, not being involved in the pricing decisions, allowing Kelly to lead the men over him, being coaxed by Raj to bring Andy into the boardroom and not backing up his choice, and for not bringing Wes back to the boardroom after him and Kevin both were responsible for the bad pricing.
- Notes:
- Episode Six recap at NBC.com
- Read the Episode 6 Recap at Yahoo!'s Apprentice 2 Website

=== Week 7: Barking Up the Wrong Tree ===
- Airdate: October 21
- Apex project manager: Jennifer M.
- Mosaic project manager: Wes
- Corporate restructuring: After the project managers were chosen, Trump told both of them to select three players that they did not want on their team. The chosen players would go to the opposing team, leaving them with three men and three women each. Jennifer M. chose Sandy, Maria, and Stacy R. to go to Mosaic. Wes chose Raj, Chris, and Kevin to go to Apex.
- Task: Create a dog service business in the Central Park area and organize a sales event, with the winning team being the one that makes the most profit.
- Judges: Donald Trump; Carolyn Kepcher; Allen Weisselberg
- Trump Monologue: Sell Your Ideas – Similar to last season's monologue Believe in Your Product, Trump talks about the necessity to have faith in one's products or ideas in order to sell them successfully.
- Winning Team: Apex, with nearly triple the sales revenue of Mosaic.
  - Reasons for victory: Apex was able to expand their services beyond washing by offering dog massages and nail clippings. As a result, they earned $307.41 in sales revenue.
  - Reward: A meeting with Michael Bloomberg.
- Losing Team: Mosaic
  - Reasons for loss: Mosaic got off to a late start and was unable to come up with a solid business plan. Andy also left the team's cellphone in a taxicab, leaving the team unable to coordinate between different locations. Wes struggled dealing with Stacy R., who spent most of task arguing with Wes when he shot down her ideas. Their total was $122.12 in sales revenue.
- Sent to boardroom: Wes, Andy, and Stacy R.
  - Firing Verdict:
    - Trump was astounded that Andy could make such a basic mistake as losing the team's cellphone, but Andy was able to make an eloquent defense of himself.
    - Wes was accused of having been a follower rather than a leader on many of the tasks, with Andy stating that Kelly had led this task more than Wes did.
    - Stacy R. came under criticism by Carolyn for having no stand-out skills after seven tasks and for failing to make any significant positive contributions to any task. Stacy blaming Wes for not listening to her, and also claimed that the biggest problem was that no one listens to her. Trump rebutted that Stacy had a responsibility to communicate more effectively, putting the onus on her.
- Fired: Stacy Rotner – for being unable to sell her ideas, making too many excuses for her shortcomings, and for being a weak contributor throughout the interview process. Despite Andy and Wes's critical mistakes on the task, Trump saw more potential in them over Stacy R., who was widely deemed as ineffective and distracting throughout the process.
- Notes:
  - Episode Seven recap at NBC.com
  - Read the Episode 7 Recap at Yahoo!'s Apprentice 2 Website

=== Week 8: A Tale of Two Leaders ===
- Airdate: October 28
- Apex project manager: Elizabeth
- Mosaic project manager: Andy
- Task: Create a recruiting ad campaign for the New York Police Department with Donny Deutsch's advertising firm.
- Judges: Donald Trump; Carolyn Kepcher; George H. Ross
- Trump Monologue: You Have to Love It – In order to work for Trump, he needs to see a genuine drive and dedication that is visible by how much potential employees love what they do.
- Winning Team: Mosaic
  - Reasons for win: Despite constantly battling with Maria (who wanted more sexuality in the ad) and Kelly (who felt they should go with a more militaristic theme), Andy stuck to his original concept of aiming for the heart and made an advert asking viewers when the last time that they saved a life or made their family proud. Donny Deutsch felt it wasn't even close, and awarded the win to Mosaic
  - Reward: Watching their ad played on a large screen in Times Square.
- Losing Team: Apex
  - Reasons for loss: The team went with a theme promoting the idea of the NYPD as a military force battling terrorism, which was heavily pushed by Chris and Raj. Not only did this not fit the original brief, but the execution also made it look like New York City was a police state, which Donny said would more likely deter potential recruits than encourage them to join. Elizabeth constantly rejected ideas and wavered on the ones she did have, only opting for the military theme at the last possible moment and proved to be such a weak leader that both Chris and Kevin threatened to take control via plotting a coup from her at various points in the task.
- Sent to boardroom: No final boardroom – During the initial boardroom, the entire team blamed Elizabeth for the loss. The entire team attacked Elizabeth for her poor performance including Raj & Chris in which they told Trump the military theme for the commercial was the only direction they went in as a result of her terrible leadership in which Jennifer M. commended them. In an Apprentice first, After Elizabeth chose to bring back Chris & Raj (who was responsible for promoting the military idea in the video), Trump decided there was no need and fired Elizabeth on the spot, due to her actions being the crux of the team's failure. George felt the same result would happen should a final boardroom take place and Trump said that was a "no brainer" and didn't want to waste the team's time.
- Fired: Elizabeth Jarosz – for producing a horrid commercial, her terrible, weak, ineffective, and incompetent leadership on this task, as well as the previous one in Week 3, two failures as Project Manager/Team Leader, inability to control the team, being too indecisive, horrible decision making, and losing the respect of her team as a result. Elizabeth mentioned early in the episode she was a crappy leader on the previous task she has led.
- Notes:
  - This is the first time in the history of The Apprentice that a candidate was fired without the need of a final boardroom.
  - After Elizabeth's elimination, Trump rarely said "sorry" to the people who was still sitting without a final boardroom.
  - Episode Eight recap at NBC.com
  - Read the Episode 8 Recap at Yahoo!'s Apprentice 2 Website

=== Week 9: Bringing Down the House ===
- Airdate: November 4
- Apex project manager: Raj
- Mosaic project manager: Sandy
- Task: With a $20,000 budget (and the help of 2 previously fired candidates), each team would renovate a home in the suburbs of Long Island. The team who has increased the value of their home by the highest percentage and raised by increase profit would win. Rob and Jennifer C. joined Mosaic and Stacie J. and Bradford were assigned to Apex.
- Judges: Donald Trump; Carolyn Kepcher; Matthew Calamari
- Trump Monologue: Control Your Contractor – Trump talks about contractors and he states that although they may not have gone to Harvard, they aren't inferior. They are tough, smart and can steal inconspicuously.
- Dramatic tension: Stacie J. went on the offensive, attacking Ivana and the other women for labeling her crazy weeks ago. Ivana was unapologetic however, and said that she stood by every word she had said about Stacie J., even going so far as to say she should not have been invited back for a task of this sort.
- Winning Team: Mosaic
  - Reasons for win: The team focused on improving and modernizing the existing infrastructure of the house. Despite initial problems caused by their contractor working slowly in the beginning, Andy found a second contractor who brought in many members of his family to get the job finished in time. Mosaic's original house was praised $390,000 to an increase of $430,000 by 10.26%. Trump was very impressed with Rob's work and enthusiasm even though he was previously fired.
  - Reward: A trip to a country house with a private beach.
- Losing Team: Apex
  - Reasons for loss: While Apex's plan was more ambitious, there were two fatal flaws. Firstly, Raj decided to knock out a wall and combine two of the bedrooms, turning it from a four bedroom into a three bedroom house, which cancelled out much of the value increase made by the other improvements. Secondly, their contractor proved lazy and ineffective, and left the downstairs rooms in a mess, and the new upstairs bathroom nowhere being finished. As a result, their house was originally praised $385,000 into $412,500 with only a value increase of just 7.14 percent.
  - Initial Boardroom: He didn't like Ivana's cattiness toward Stacie J., although it seemed Ivana's anger was aimed mostly at Jennifer M. for politicking on Stacie J.'s behalf. When Trump released Chris and Jennifer M. from the initial boardroom, Chris turned to Trump and said that he didn't think Apex had any chance of winning another task due to the poor atmosphere within the team. Trump was outraged by this act of disloyalty and offered Raj the chance to bring Chris back into the final boardroom, but Raj refused to do this, saying that Chris wasn't to blame for the loss, and on prompting from Matthew, Chris volunteered to lead the team the following week.
- Sent to boardroom: Raj, Ivana, Kevin
- Firing Verdict:
  - Trump questioned the wisdom of making a four bedroom house into three bedrooms, pointing out that this may have cost them the win.
  - Jennifer M. and Raj decide to target Ivana in the boardroom, but their efforts misfire when Trump says that Ivana didn't belong in the final boardroom.
  - Trump told Raj that he would absolutely have fired Chris had he been brought back for his stupid interjections by making disloyal negative remarks about this team.
- Fired: Raj Bhakta – for making numerous mistakes throughout the task as Project Manager/Team Leader, including unable to finish the task, ruining the house's value by knocking down one of the bedrooms(making a 4-bedroom house a 3-bedroom house instead), and for not bringing Chris back to the final boardroom after he made disloyal comments about his team prior to being released from the initial boardroom session. While Ivana's behavior towards Stacie J was questionable and Kevin was responsible for hiring the lousy contractor, Trump felt that Raj's mistakes were the most critical for Apex's failure and cited that Raj making so many mistakes is a detriment to The Trump Organization.
- Notes:
  - Matthew Calamari is the sub judge for George Ross.
  - Jennifer M. told Raj she would support him in the Boardroom and that they should focus on getting Ivana fired. Unfortunately, Jen attacked Ivana in the suite stating "you're not good for anything but filling out spreadsheets" and mocking the idea that the "barely producing" Ivana would bring down someone as great as herself; this alerted Ivana to defend herself, which she did strongly and led to the quick focus for potential firing on either Raj or Chris.
  - Trump wore a tuxedo to the boardroom meeting as he was giving out an award at a hotel later that night, and remarked that it would be a "formal firing."
  - After Raj is eliminated, he asked Robin Himmler for her phone number; while she didn't give him the number at the time, she later revealed she and Raj did go out for coffee after the show was over.
- Episode Nine recap at NBC.com
- Read the Episode 9 Recap at Yahoo!'s Apprentice 2 Website

=== Week 10: Runaway Pride ===
- Airdate: November 11
- Prologue: Following Apex's previous boardroom session, Chris becomes the Project Manager for Apex's next task at Matt's & Trump's discretion after making disloyal comments about his team.
- Apex project manager: Chris
- Mosaic project manager: Kelly
- The task: Open a bridal shop and sell dresses. The winning team would conclude as to who earns the most profit in their final sales.
- Judges: Donald Trump; Carolyn Kepcher; George H. Ross
- Trump Monologue: Believe In Yourself – Echoing the age old theme of a positive attitude and self-confidence.
- Dramatic tension: Maria and Wes failed to include the telephone number on Mosaic's appointment flyer, frustrating the rest of the team. Sandy was worried about Kelly's leadership relying too much on her expertise and the team's ability to attract the customers into the store. Kelly also became concerned with Wes' poor driving which resulted in hitting a car, fearing that spending money on car repairs might cause a loss. On Apex, Chris struggled throughout the task as he couldn't figure out a way to market wedding dresses to public, and felt it was pointless considering their opponents had someone who was an expert on their side. Ivana and Kevin jointly ignored Jennifer M. throughout the task and left her with menial work following her attacks on them in the previous boardroom.
- Winning team: Mosaic
  - Reasons for win: Mosaic had a huge advantage in having Sandy, who owned a bridal shop prior to joining the process. They began their marketing plan earlier than Apex and composed successful email blasts, despite that the fact that their appointment document did not include a telephone number. Their sales stood at $12,788.94 and sold 27 dresses.
  - Reward: $50,000 jewelry shopping spree at Graff with Melania Trump. Trump bought Melania's engagement ring from there.
- Losing team: Apex
  - Reasons for Loss: Apex's sales were only $1,060.47 and they only sold two dresses. Feeling outmatched due to Mosaic's edge with Sandy, Chris was unable to create any kind of effective marketing strategy, with their only marketing strategy was handing out flyers at Penn Station and Grand Central and window artwork promoting the bridal sale.
- Sent to boardroom: Chris, Kevin, Ivana
  - Firing Verdict: Trump and his advisors felt that Penn Station or Grand Central were not good locations to promote marriage or wedding dresses. He also disliked that Chris didn't back Jennifer M., saying she was just as responsible for the loss, even though Jennifer being responsible for stocking the vendors. Trump also felt that Chris mentally checked out of the task early on and lost the drive he had in previous tasks.
- Fired: Chris Russo – for mentally checking out at the beginning of the task, leading his team to a crushing defeat, losing his drive to continue in the process, having no real sales strategy throughout the task, unable to make delegations, not bringing Jennifer M. back to the Final Boardroom, maintaining a terrible attitude, and his disloyal, negative, offensive comments to his team last week.

Notes:

- This was the first episode where Trump and his advisors didn't give post firing comments.
- Episode Ten recap at NBC.com
- Read the Episode 10 Recap at Yahoo!'s Apprentice 2 Website

=== Week 11: The Butt Stops Here ===
- Airdate: November 18, 2004
- Apex project manager: Kevin
- Mosaic project manager: Wes
- Task: The teams are asked to create an in-store advertising catalog for Levi's Jeans, judged by Levi's president.
- Judges: Donald Trump, Carolyn Kepcher and Bill Rancic
- Corporate Shuffle: Kelly is transferred to Apex to even the teams.
- Trump Monologue: Never Lose Your Cool – Trump discusses the importance of maintaining composure, noting that it can be used to inspire employees.
- Dramatic tension: Once again, Ivana and Kevin isolated Jennifer M. with busywork while they create the bulk of the catalog with Kelly. Sensing she was being sabotaged, Jennifer would later insert herself into the campaign presentation, making herself appear responsible for the wheel which was Ivana's concept. The Levi's president tells Trump that Jennifer did the best job, angering Ivana. On Mosaic, Maria shuts Wes out of the photo shoot and refuses to let the rest of the team see their catalog. At one point during the task, Maria snapped at Wes to "back off" while pointing her finger in his face.
- Winning team: Apex
  - Reasons for Win: Apex had a campaign revolving around "The Perfect Fit" and a circular wheel helping customers pick the style of pants that's right for them.
  - Reward: Billy Joel concert
- Losing team: Mosaic
  - Reasons for Loss: Mosaic did not clearly communicate the fit range nor the sponsor's brand message that Levi's have a fit for everyone.
- Sent to boardroom: Wes, Andy, Maria, Sandy – Project Manager Wes wanted All of Mosaic to return for Final Boardroom.
  - Firing Verdict: Trump was peeved at both Maria and Wes for their errors throughout the task. He called out Andy for being quiet in the boardroom, but accepted his smooth response. Carolyn felt that Sandy wasn't getting her point across and that Wes was a poor leader. Due to bad leadership and poor performance from Maria, Trump fire both Maria and Wes.
- Fired: In an Apprentice first, Trump fired more than one person outside of the interview process. Maria Boren and Wes Moss were fired for the following reasons:
  - Maria Boren – for her blatant disrespect towards her team, lashing out at Wes, the project manager, being completely unmanageable, giving a terrible presentation, and being the most responsible for the unsuccessful campaign after taking too much control of the project.
  - Wes Moss – for lousy leadership on this task and the previous one in week 7, being too feeble, two failures as Project Manager/Team Leader, being a follower rather than a leader, losing control of Maria, and making no attempt to alleviate the tension that she caused throughout the task.
- Notes:
  - Carolyn angrily chastised Maria by saying if any one of her employees had told her to "back off", they would not be working for her and would be fired immediately.
  - Similar to the second task, Mosaic found Apex's business plan, but ultimately Apex won. In task two, Apex found Mosaic's plan out in the open and Mosaic won.
  - This was the first multi-firing (outside the interview stage) in the series. Because the dual departure was not planned, Maria and Wes shared a single taxi, with Wes stating in the exit interview: "I would have at least liked to have my own cab".

=== Week 12: The Pepsi Challenge ===
- Airdate: November 25, 2004
- Apex project manager: Kelly
- Mosaic project manager: Andy
- Task: The teams are asked to create a new bottle for Pepsi Edge, and present it to Pepsi's entire advertising team.
- Judges: Donald Trump; Carolyn Kepcher; George H. Ross
- Corporate shuffle: Jennifer M. is transferred onto Mosaic to even out the teams, which Ivana refers to as a tumor being lifted from the team.
- Trump Monologue: Form Your Own Opinion – As a leader Trump listens to his team, but in the end forms his own opinion. The leader that wants to be popular or to be loved, that leader ultimately is not going to make it.
- Dramatic tension: Andy refused to let Pepsi employees eat their pizza when it was delivered, because they hadn't finished part of the task. He also gave cash incentives to the Pepsi employees, because he thought it would motivate them. Despite Sandy's clear objections, Andy gave the cash anyway.
- Winning team: Apex
  - Reasons for Win: Apex develops a bottle that has the letters D and G carved out of plastic, providing the grounds for a theme of hiding things in the inside of the D (referred to by the team as "What's in the box?"). Their bottle represents "What Pepsi Edge is all about."
  - Reward: Racing Lamborghini Gallardos around a track.
- Losing team: Mosaic
  - Reasons for Loss: Mosaic develops a theme of "The Best of Both Worlds", designed to appeal to the "dual users" of both diet and regular colas. The bottle is shaped like a regular Pepsi bottle with two halves of a globe on the bottom and top. A contest revolving around collecting areas of a continent to win a "Trip to the Edge" is also proposed. Although the Pepsi Advertising Team liked the label of the team's bottle, their bottle was unappealing for having a design of the bottle with blobs in it and felt like lifting a dumbbell (one of the advertising executives stated he didn't remember "when the last time geography was cool").
- Sent to boardroom: Andy, Jennifer M., Sandy
  - Firing Verdict:
    - Trump agreed with the ad executive's decision that the bottle was too boring, lifting it as a dumbbell at one point.
    - George was impressed with Sandy's defense and felt Andy wasn't strong enough to have a winning concept.
    - Carolyn questioned why Jennifer M. gets defended by a project manager every time she's in the boardroom.
    - Before the boardroom, Andy approaches Jennifer M. and proposes that they gang up on Sandy. Over the course of the initial boardroom, Sandy figures this out and begins to deride both of them for their actions. Showered with a debate raging on both sides of him, Andy appeared helpless as Jennifer and Sandy scream at each other constantly until Trump bangs on the table to get their attention.
    - Trump got upset at Andy for his performance in the task, as well as getting outdebated by both women in the boardroom.
- Fired: Andy Litinsky – for coming up with a terrible idea for the bottle and for his unprofessional behavior to the Pepsi employees. He also let himself get bombarded by Sandy and Jennifer during the boardroom, which did not show any of his abilities as a debate champion. Trump said afterwards he had planned initially to fire Sandy but her impressive defense in the Boardroom changed his mind.

Notes:

- When Sandy and Jennifer left the boardroom and got on the elevator Sandy continued to argue with Jennifer over the conversation she and Andy had before the boardroom
- Episode Twelve recap at NBC.com
- Read the Episode 12 Recap at Yahoo!'s Apprentice 2 Website

=== Week 13: Sweet & Lowdown ===
- Airdate: December 2
- Apex project manager: Ivana
- Mosaic project manager: Sandy
- Task: The two teams are assigned to produce and sell the M-AZING candy bar, a new product from M&M Mars. The team that makes the most profit from selling the candy bars is the winner.
- Judges: Donald Trump; Carolyn Kepcher; George H. Ross
- Trump Monologue: Know Your Enemy – Trump says, the worst thing one can do is to underestimate one's opponent. Though an opponent may seem weak, they could be the toughest, smartest person in the world.
- Result: Apex produces about 323 candy bars, while Mosaic produces only about 290 candy bars.
- Winning team: Mosaic
  - Reasons for win: Despite making fewer candy bars, Jennifer M. and Sandy priced their candy bars $5 higher than Apex did, which gave them a greater overall revenue. The women also wore flashy outfits as part of their marketing material, which attracted them to more buyers. They made their total profit of $1,023.11.
  - Reward: Flying to Chicago to meet Bill Rancic at the Trump International Hotel and Tower Chicago.
- Losing team: Apex
  - Reasons for loss: Apex's price point was too low, with Kevin selling his candy bars even lower after being initially unsuccessful with the set price. In a desperate attempt to sell a candy bar to a man for $20 on Wall Street, Ivana dropped her skirt in public. They only made a total profit of $560.75.
- Sent to boardroom: Ivana, Kevin, Kelly
  - Firing Verdict: Apex was grilled for the loss, given that they had more candy bars in stock and their opponents were a duo who could barely stand each other. Ivana had virtually no defense in the boardroom, as both Kelly and Kevin had superior track records in both the tasks and as project managers. At one point, Ivana angrily exclaimed that Jennifer M. had the same number of task losses, but Jennifer wasn't even in the boardroom. George felt Kelly and Kevin were more liable for the loss after setting the price too low, but Carolyn found Ivana's stripping gimmick reprehensible and couldn't even think of one good contribution that Ivana had made throughout the entire process.
- Fired: Ivana Ma – for stripping in public to upsell the candy bars in an act of desperation, her terrible track record including her bad team record of 5-8 and two failures as Project Manager/Team Leader, and poorly defending herself in the boardroom. While Kevin's decision to set the price low was arguably the biggest factor in Apex's loss, Trump felt Ivana had been a far poorer performer compared to Kevin who had a far better track record.
- Episode Thirteen recap at NBC.com
- Read the Episode 13 Recap at Yahoo!'s Apprentice 2 Website
- Notes:
  - Ironically, Ivana had said in task 2 that she'd rather lose with dignity than resort to using her sexuality to sell something. This would completely contradict her performance in this task, when she was willing to drop her skirt to anyone who would give her $20 for her candy bar.
  - Kelly's exemption from the previous week meant that he was not in danger of being fired, but Trump nevertheless had him come back to the final boardroom to help decide whether Ivana or Kevin should be fired.
  - Right before he fired Ivana, Trump stated that it was because he did not want to hire a stripper. In her exit interview, Ivana defended her actions, claiming that she was wearing more than Mosaic (which was arguably untrue) and that she had worn even less at the gym, and saying that albeit it wasn't her proudest moment, she was able to successfully sell her item.

=== Week 14: Intellectual Horsepower ===
- Airdate: December 9
- Prologue: Teams, rewards, and project managers no longer apply per the final four candidates, and Trump showed the final four a preview on how he views the life of The Apprentice.
- Trump Monologue: Winning Is Everything – There's no better feeling than being a winner. In order to be a winner, one has to be positive and think like a winner with no intention of giving up.
- Task scope: The candidates will go for one-on-one interviews with four prolific executives. These executive will personally interview the final four candidates and then advise Trump on which two candidates should be fired. The interviewers are as follows:
  - Alan Jope, Chief Operating Officer of Unilever
  - Dawn Hudson, President of Pepsi-Cola North America
  - Alan "Ace" Greenberg, Chairman of Bear Stearns
  - Robert Kraft, Owner of the NFL's New England Patriots.
- Boardroom details: The executives unanimously liked Kelly, even though one felt he was a bit stiff, as they felt he was good as both a leader and a follower and liked that he had a military history. The interviewers liked Kevin, but found him to be aimless, and stressed to Trump that they would not hire anyone with excessive uncertainty. Although the interviewers liked Jennifer M., they felt that she was just giving them what they wanted to hear, rather than what she really had to say. The executives did like Sandy, but they deemed her unworthy of working for Trump, mainly because they were unsure of her ability to transition into a corporate environment and worried about her lack of a college degree.
- Fired:
  - Kevin Allen – for excessive procrastination and failure to pursue a strong professional career path due to his lengthy educational efforts.
  - Sandy Ferreira – for unmet skills in the corporate world.
- Episode Fourteen recap at NBC.com
- Read the Episode 14 Recap at Yahoo!'s Apprentice 2 Website

=== Final Task: The Task of All Tasks ===
- Airdate: Part one was televised on December 9, and part two was televised on December 16
- Tasks:
  - Jennifer M.: an NBA Charity Task, involving professional basketball players, including Chris Webber
  - Kelly: a polo match which would be followed by a concert starring Tony Bennett
- Teams:
  - Mosaic: Jennifer M. with Chris, Pamela, and Stacy R.
  - Apex: Kelly with Elizabeth, John, and Raj
- Judges: Donald Trump; Carolyn Kepcher; George H. Ross
- Kelly said that the last two candidates he had to pick from to round out his team (Raj and Stacy R.) had identical abilities, and that he chose Raj because Raj's preppy outfit was a "good fit" for their polo match task.
- Jen didn't want Stacy R. on her team and made a quiet comment to that effect to Pamela after the teams gathered, but Stacy R. overheard the remark and shocked Jen by informing her that she didn't belong in the Final 2 at all (she said that Sandy should have gotten the other spot) and that if Jen didn't want to be completely embarrassed by Kelly she needed to stop being an asshole and start leading for once. Jen apologized and took Stacy R.'s work seriously for the rest of the task.
- Kelly was so pissed off about Raj and John's lazy, unproductive actions that he considered firing or sidelining them, but ultimately kept them in place (and they ended up working hard and doing a good job for him on the tasks). Like the Kwame-Omarosa fiasco in Season 1, fans were left wondering without clarification if Kelly actually COULD have fired them, or if he had no choice but to manage them no matter how badly they performed. In Season 3, George Ross finally made it explicit by telling the Final 2 that "bosses are free to use employees any way they want to."
- In spite of what the episode showed, it was revealed that Chris Webber never even heard of the event, and his name was included to give Jen's team the responsibility of figuring out how to "replace" him at the charity task. Webber later said he would have appeared if he had been given notice or asked directly by Donald Trump.

=== Decision Time ===
- Airdate: December 16, the conclusion to the Season Finale was televised live from Alice Tully Hall at Lincoln Center, New York City with Regis Philbin as event emcee.
- Decision: Sandy, Kevin, Ivana, Wes, and Chris felt that Kelly should win. Andy and Pamela felt that Jennifer M. should win.
- Hired: Kelly Perdew – for his proven record and expertise was preferred over Jennifer M.'s, even though Trump cited that Kelly couldn't bring a military background to business and had doubts over Kelly's leadership style (despite his 3–0 record as project manager).
- Fired: Jennifer Massey – for excessive losses in the tasks (5–8) and for her unpopularity with most of the other candidates. It was also the first time a runner-up was told in the finale: "You're fired".
- What is next for Kelly: Kelly decided to oversee a project in New York City over the other choice on the Las Vegas Strip.
- See the Episode 15 Recap at NBC.com.
