= The Ultimate Merger =

Television series

- Also known as: Omarosa's Ultimate Merger
- Created by: Donald Trump; Andy Litinsky
- Starring: Omarosa (season 1); Toccara Jones (season 2)
- Theme music composer: Mark C. Rooney; Mark Morales
- Opening theme: "Real Love"; Performed by Mary J. Blige
- Country of origin: United States
- Original language: English
- No. of seasons: 2
- No. of episodes: 16

Production
- Executive producers: Donald Trump; Robert C. Horowitz; Lewis Fenton; D Renard Young; Andy Litinsky
- Production locations: Las Vegas, Nevada
- Running time: 60 minutes
- Production companies: Juma Entertainment; Trump Productions; TV One Original Productions

Original release
- Network: TV One
- Release: June 17, 2010 – September 22, 2011

Related
- The Apprentice (American TV series)

Donald J. Trump Presents The Ultimate Merger is an American reality television dating game show. A spin-off of The Apprentice, the series premiered on TV One on June 17, 2010. The series' first season starred Omarosa, who in 2004 appeared on the first season of The Apprentice, another American reality series. This show was not remotely as successful or as popular as The Apprentice, with a 1.9/10 rating on IMDb.

Season 2 premiered on August 4, 2011, starring former America's Next Top Model and Celebrity Fit Club contestant Toccara Jones. The show was canceled in 2012 after airing two seasons on TV1.

== Show format ==
The format of The Ultimate Merger is reminiscent of two previous reality series, The Bachelorette and The Apprentice. Twelve men selected by billionaire real estate mogul, Donald Trump (host and co-executive producer of The Apprentice, later 45th and 47th president of the United States) compete for the affections of Omarosa, the former political consultant who has become the most infamous Apprentice contestant. Omarosa receives assistance in the selection process from her spiritual advisor Dr. Jamal Harrison Bryant, pastor of the Empowerment Temple A.M.E. Church in Baltimore, Maryland. Other personalities appearing on the series include comedians George Wallace and Loni Love, TV chef G. Garvin, author Karrine Steffans, and Apprentice alumni Katrina Campins, Troy McClaine and Nick Warnock.

While on the show, the contestants live together in a huge suite at the Trump International Hotel in Las Vegas, Nevada. In each episode, they are directed to participate in a mental or physical challenge designed to gauge each man's potential compatibility with Omarosa. The winner(s) of each challenge attend a date with her later that evening. Subsequently, the contestants must gather in the "Mediation Room", where Omarosa (assisted by Dr. Bryant or another celebrity guest) questions several of the contestants regarding their actions and attitudes while on the show. One or more contestants is then selected for elimination by Omarosa, and that man must immediately leave Trump International and the show.

This process resulted in one man, R&B singer Ray Lavender, remaining as the potential beau for Omarosa. However, because Lavender was legally separated at the time (and thus technically still married), he was eliminated as well – and Omarosa was left with no one.

Soon after the first-season finale, Omarosa publicly revealed that she was in a new relationship with Academy Award-nominated actor Michael Clarke Duncan who later died on September 3, 2012, due to a heart attack.

== Participants ==
Omarosa

Omarosa Manigault-Stallworth is a reality show personality who worked at one time as a scheduling correspondent for then-Vice President Al Gore during the Clinton Administration. She was a contestant on the first season of The Apprentice, where she was "fired" in Week 9 of the 15-week process. She returned for the series' seventh season (the first incarnation of The Celebrity Apprentice), but was "fired" once again in Week 10. In 2000, she married Aaron Stallworth, but the two separated in 2005 and later divorced.

=== Contestants ===
Ray Lavender

Ray is a 33-year-old R&B singer originally from Monroe, Louisiana, now residing in Atlanta, Georgia. Eliminated in episode 8.

Al B. Sure!

Al B. Sure! is a 41-year-old R&B recording artist from Mount Vernon, New York, best known for his 1988 single "Nite and Day". He and Omarosa have dated previously. Eliminated in episode 8.

Charles Parker

Charles is a 43-year-old foreign currency trader from Washington, D.C. He and Omarosa have dated previously. Voluntarily leaves the show for personal reasons in episode 4. Returns – and is eliminated – in episode 8.

Isaac Keys

Isaac Keys is a 32-year-old former NFL football player from St. Louis, Missouri, now residing in Los Angeles, California. Eliminated in episode 7.

Lyle Silva

Lyle is a 36-year-old attorney originally from New Bedford, Massachusetts, now residing in Bowie, Maryland. Eliminated in episode 7.

Javis Dortch

Javis is a 34-year-old entrepreneur originally from Jersey City, New Jersey, now residing in Douglasville, Georgia. Eliminated in episode 6.

C.J. Miller

C.J. is a 27-year-old author/model from Los Angeles, California. In 2009, he appeared as a contestant on the first season of the reality series True Beauty. Eliminated in episode 5.

Michael Madd

Michael is a 29-year-old concert promoter from New York, New York. Eliminated in episode 4.

Eddy Puyol

Eddy is a 30-year-old Christian rapper from Miami, Florida, now residing in Palm Beach Gardens, Florida. Eliminated in episode 3.

Sterling Williams

Sterling is a 42-year-old fashion designer from Los Angeles, California. Eliminated in episode 3.

Jason Mitchell

Jason is a 30-year-old massage therapist from New York, New York. Eliminated in episode 2.

Darrell Kiedo

Darrell is a 40-year-old movie producer from Memphis, Tennessee. He is the author of the book The Black Actor's Guide to Not Working in Hollywood, which was published in 2003. Eliminated in episode 1.
