= The Apprentice (American TV series) season 10 =

10th season of American TV series The Apprentice

The Apprentice
- Season 10
- No. of contestants: 16
- Winner: Brandy Kuentzel
- Runner-up: Clint Robertson
- No. of episodes: 13

Release
- Original network: NBC
- Original release: September 16 – December 9, 2010

Additional information
- Filming dates: June 1 – June 29, 2010

Season chronology
- ← Previous; Season 9 Next → Season 11

The Apprentice 10 is the tenth and final original format installment of the United States version of international franchise and reality game series The Apprentice. For this particular season, the show departed from The Celebrity Apprentice and returned to its precursor, featuring unknowns as apprentices instead of celebrities. Not since season six, during the 2006–07 television season, did the show use this format. The theme of the season is "second chance" and the contestants are those affected by the Great Recession. Brandy Kuentzel was the winner of this season.

The format of the show is much the same as was employed between the first and fifth seasons, with the changes introduced in The Apprentice: Los Angeles being discarded. The biggest change is to the rewards—unlike the often-lavish rewards that had been granted in prior seasons to the winning teams, in this season, the winning Project Managers are rewarded with one-on-one meetings with some of America's best-known business leaders and CEOs. Taping began June 1, 2010, and ended on June 29, 2010. The season premiered on Thursday, September 16, 2010, at 9–11 pm ET.

Despite hopes by fans that this season would lead to a permanent return of the original format, the season received the lowest audience figures of any Apprentice season, managing barely half the ratings of the panned season six, which had been the previous lowest-rated season. In addition, critics roundly condemned the decision to bring back the non-charity format, saying it was inappropriate to do so during an economic crisis (although this season was dedicated to helping victims of the recession). Because of the poor ratings and lackluster reception of this season, Donald Trump confirmed on the day of the final episode that the original format would be permanently discontinued after this season, and that all future seasons of the show would be in the Celebrity Apprentice format. The season was the first in the history of The Apprentice to end without a live finale.

== Candidates ==
Candidate	Background	Original team	Age	Hometown	Result
Brandy Kuentzel	Former corporate attorney	Fortitude	30	San Francisco, California	Hired by Trump (12–09–2010)
Clint Robertson	Struggling property developer	Octane	40	Fort Worth, Texas	Fired in the season finale (12–09–2010)
Liza Mucheru-Wisner	Struggling business owner	Fortitude	30	Corpus Christi, Texas	Fired in week 12 (12–02–2010)
Steuart Martens	Fledgling entrepreneur	Octane	27	Washington, D.C.	Fired in week 11 (11–25–2010)
Stephanie Castagnier	Unemployed banker	Fortitude	34	Chicago, Illinois	Fired in week 10 (11–18–2010)
Poppy Carlig	Unemployed grad student	Fortitude	24	Richmond, California	Fired in week 9 (11–11–2010)
Anand Vasudev	Struggling business owner	Octane	31	Tampa, Florida	Disqualified in week 9 (11–11–2010)
David Johnson	Unemployed account manager	Octane	34	Portage, Michigan	Fired in week 8 (11–04–2010)
Mahsa Saeidi-Azcuy	Assistant district attorney	Fortitude	29	Brooklyn, New York	Fired in week 7 (10–28–2010)
Kelly Smith Beaty	Unemployed publicist	Fortitude	30	Fayetteville, Georgia	Fired in week 6 (10–21–2010)
Wade Hanson	Struggling realtor	Octane	33	Woodbury, Minnesota	Fired in week 5 (10–14–2010)
Gene Folkes	Unemployed financial adviser	Octane	46	Wylie, Texas	Fired in week 5 (10–14–2010)
Tyana Alvarado	Unemployed sales rep.	Fortitude	41	Miami, Florida	Fired in week 4 (10–07–2010)
James Weir	Unemployed attorney	Octane	31	New York, New York	Fired in week 3 (09–30–2010)
Alex Delgado	Former construction engineer	Octane	43	Santa Ynez, California	Fired in week 2 (09–23–2010)
Nicole Chiu	Unemployed attorney	Fortitude	27	Palos Verdes, California	Fired in week 1 (09–16–2010)

== Weekly results ==
Candidate	Original team	Week 8 team	Week 9 team	Week 11 team	Final Task team	Application result	Record as project manager
Brandy Kuentzel	Fortitude	Octane	Octane	Fortitude	Fortitude	Hired by Trump	1–0 (win in week 8)
Clint Robertson	Octane	Octane	Octane	Octane	Octane	Fired in the season finale	2–1 (win in weeks 4 & 9, loss in week 11)
Liza Mucheru-Wisner	Fortitude	Octane	Fortitude	Fortitude	Fortitude	Fired in week 12	1–1 (win in week 11, loss in week 7)
Steuart Martens	Octane	Octane	Octane	Octane	Octane	Fired in week 11	2–0 (win in weeks 7 & 10)
Stephanie Castagnier	Fortitude	Fortitude	Fortitude		Fortitude	Fired in week 10	1–1 (win in week 5, loss in week 10)
Poppy Carlig	Fortitude	Fortitude	Fortitude		Octane	Fired in week 9	1–1 (win in week 2, loss in week 9)
Anand Vasudev	Octane	Fortitude			Fortitude	Disqualified in week 9	1–0 (win in week 6)
David Johnson	Octane	Fortitude				Fired in week 8	0–2 (loss in weeks 2 & 8)
Mahsa Saeidi-Azcuy	Fortitude				Octane	Fired in week 7	0–1 (loss in week 4)
Kelly Smith Beaty	Fortitude					Fired in week 6	0–1 (loss in week 6)
Wade Hanson	Octane					Fired in week 5	0–1 (loss in week 5)
Gene Folkes	Octane					Fired in week 5	1–0 (win in week 1)
Tyana Alvarado	Fortitude					Fired in week 4	1–0 (win in week 3)
James Weir	Octane					Fired in week 3	0–1 (loss in week 3)
Alex Delgado	Octane					Fired in week 2	
Nicole Chiu	Fortitude					Fired in week 1	0–1 (loss in week 1)

Elimination chart
No.	Candidate	1	2	3	4	5	6	7	8	9	10	11	12	13
1	Brandy	IN	IN	IN	IN	IN	IN	IN	WIN	IN	IN	IN	IN	HIRED
2	Clint	IN	IN	IN	WIN	IN	IN	IN	IN	WIN	IN	LOSE	IN	FIRED
3	Liza	IN	IN	IN	BR	IN	BR	LOSE	IN	BR	BR	WIN	FIRED	
4	Steuart	IN	IN	IN	IN	IN	IN	WIN	IN	IN	WIN	FIRED		
5	Stephanie	IN	IN	IN	IN	WIN	BR	IN	BR	BR	FIRED			
6	Poppy	IN	WIN	IN	IN	IN	IN	IN	BR	FIRED				
7	Anand	IN	IN	IN	IN	IN	WIN	IN	IN	DQ				
8	David	IN	LOSE	BR	IN	IN	IN	IN	FIRED					
9	Mahsa	BR	IN	IN	LOSE	IN	IN	FIRED						
10	Kelly	IN	IN	IN	IN	IN	FIRED							
11	Wade	IN	IN	BR	IN	FIRED								
12	Gene	WIN	IN	IN	IN	FIRED								
13	Tyana	BR	IN	WIN	FIRED									
14	James	IN	BR	FIRED										
15	Alex	IN	FIRED											
16	Nicole	FIRED												

The candidate was hired and won the competition.
The candidate won as project manager on his/her team.
The candidate lost as project manager on his/her team.
The candidate was on the losing team.
The candidate was on the losing team and brought to the final boardroom.
The candidate was fired.
The candidate lost as project manager and was fired.
The candidate was disqualified from the competition for breaking the rules.
The candidate didn't participate in the challenge.

== Episodes ==
=== Episode 1: Back to Work ===
- Airdate: September 16, 2010
- Task scope: The teams were tasked with creating an office workspace.
- Fortitude project manager: Nicole
- Octane project manager: Gene
- Judges: Donald Trump; Ivanka Trump; Donald Trump Jr.
- Winning team: Octane
- Reasons for win: Trump expressed that he didn't like either team's designs, but he preferred Octane's modern SOHO design.
- Reward: Gene is rewarded by having the opportunity to sit down with Donald Trump
- Losing team: Fortitude
- Reasons for loss: Their office space felt too enclosed and uninviting. Moreover, Tyana insisted on placing a portrait of an unidentified elderly businessman in the middle of the office, giving it an overly formal and stuffy atmosphere.
- Sent to boardroom: Nicole, Tyana, Mahsa
- Fired: Nicole Chiu – for being deemed unanimously as a bad leader by her teammates and for losing their respect, a lack of overall leadership, relying on the team too much for decision making, and for not effectively defending herself in the boardroom against Tyana and Mahsa.

=== Episode 2: Frozen Assets ===
- Airdate: September 23, 2010
- Task scope: The teams had to sell ice cream on the streets of New York.
- Fortitude project manager: Poppy
- Octane project manager: David
- Judges: Donald Trump; George H. Ross; Donald Trump Jr.
- Tension: Constant bickering between Stephanie, Poppy, Brandy, and Liza flared.
- Winning team: Fortitude
- Reasons for win: They earned $1800 in profit.
- Reward: Poppy is rewarded by having the opportunity to sit down with Jack Welch, former CEO Of General Electric and two-year scholarship to the Jack Welch Management Institute
- Losing team: Octane
- Reasons for loss: Lost by $300 with total profit of $1500.
- Sent to boardroom: David, Alex, James
- Fired: Alex Delgado – for lack of skill in sales, not defending himself in the boardroom, and for not being a good overall contributor to the team, as well as not having enough passion.
- Notes:
  - Fortitude acknowledged that tension was building between them, and the women said that if they lost that Liza should be fired. Trump jokingly fired Liza and then announced that the women won.
  - Alex is the only person this season not to have a record as project manager.

=== Episode 3: Working Like a Dog ===
- Airdate: September 30, 2010
- Task scope: To organize and manage a doggy day care.
- Fortitude project manager: Tyana
- Octane project manager: James
- Judges: Donald Trump; Ivanka Trump; Donald Trump Jr.
- Tension: At Octane, James prevented David from asking questions in the meeting with the owner, which infuriated David. At Fortitude, Tyana did not want Mahsa working at reception, which angered Mahsa. In the boardroom, the girls once again went after Liza after Brandy informed Trump that Liza had sworn at Poppy, and Liza became emotional when they all attacked her in the boardroom. However, the girls eventually won and Donald jokingly said that Liza still had to work with "these bitches."
- Winning team: Fortitude
- Reasons for win: The women's team was run smooth and nicely done. Both the owner of the day care and Mr. Milan loved what the women did.
- Reward: A sit down with Russell Simmons, co-founder of Def Jam Recordings and founder of Phat Farm, and a $10,000 Calvin Klein gift card
- Losing team: Octane
- Reasons for loss: The owner hated the job that the men's team did and felt that James showed him a lack of respect by repeatedly ignoring his requests to be told what the men were doing. It also did not help that James had removed David from the project completely, which left them a man down.
- Sent to boardroom: James, Wade, David
- Fired: James Weir – for not being respected by his teammates, not listening to the owner of the shop, benching David for no good reason, then bringing him back and questionable motives in bringing Wade to the boardroom also.

=== Episode 4: Snack Attack ===
- Airdate: October 7, 2010
- Task scope: The teams are asked to develop a viral video for Popcorn Indiana.
- Fortitude project manager: Mahsa
- Octane project manager: Clint
- Judges: Donald Trump; Ivanka Trump; Donald Trump Jr.
- Winning team: Octane
- Reasons for win: Even though the judges didn't like the violence in the viral video, they felt the men's team video was more entertaining.
- Reward: Clint got to meet with Steve Forbes of Forbes magazine
- Losing team: Fortitude
- Reasons for loss: Although the executives thought they had a better idea of popcorn in the gym, they felt it seemed more like a commercial and didn't focus on the right demographic.
- Boardroom tension: Although Liza wanted to blame the project manager, she instead went after Tyana, fearing the wrath of Mahsa in the boardroom. Tyana in turn attempted to accuse Mahsa of coming up with a bad concept, but shot herself in the foot by doing so, since Trump and the Popcorn Indiana executives thought the idea itself was a very good one which had been lost in the execution, and that if anything Tyana was the one to blame for that.
- Sent to boardroom: Mahsa, Tyana, Liza
- Fired: Tyana Alvarado – for complaining about the team's concept of the viral video and effectively being disloyal, having no ideas for the video herself, and for her very little contributions in the task.
- Notes:
  - David had to withdraw from the task at the start of the day, after one of his teeth broke apart while eating breakfast. Steuart tried to persuade Clint to bring David back into the boardroom anyway if the men lost, but Clint thought this was a bad idea, and that Trump wouldn't fire David for something that wasn't his fault.
  - While Wade had said in the previous boardroom that he would be Octane's project manager on this task, he allowed Clint to take the role instead, annoying Trump when he found this out in the task briefing. Wade said that he would lead Octane in the next task, to which Trump replied "Let's hope you last that long", strongly implying that Wade would have been fired had the men lost.

=== Episode 5: Rock the Catwalk ===
- Airdate: October 14, 2010
- Task scope: The teams were asked to manage and present a fashion show presenting men's & women's shoe lines for Rockport.
- Fortitude project manager: Stephanie
- Octane project manager: Wade
- Judges: Donald Trump; Juan Betancourt; Catherine Roman
- Winning team: Fortitude
- Reasons for win: Despite the fact that one of their models was considered unattractive and some of their clothing choices were questionable, they were much smoother and more effective in their presentation.
- Reward: Stephanie received a personal interview with Rockport CEO Michael Rupp and participation in one of Adidas Group's advanced management training program
- Losing team: Octane
- Reasons for loss: While their models were well-dressed and attractive, Octane's presentation was extremely mismanaged by poor leadership. The judges specifically noted that Gene was without the tools to properly serve as emcee for the presentation, because he did not have his glasses, Gene could not see the presentation slides, which was poorly constructed, causing Gene to fumble, stumble, stutter, and mispronounce his words, forcing Gene to navigate with a poorly written presentation. The presentation was boring, and Gene had presented from behind a computer, which only added onto the lack of professionalism. He also forgot to explain how beautiful the shoes actually looked.
- Sent to boardroom: No final boardroom – Trump decided that Wade did not deserve to select anyone for the final boardroom because he delivered exceptionally poor results for his team. Anand and Steuart were safe, as well as Clint since he was not responsible for the loss. Although David made offensive remarks about his teammates and abandoning the presentation due to Gene's terrible presentation, Trump had enough evidence to fire both Wade and Gene due to their terrible performances on this task as well as Gene admitting that he deserved to be fired. Trump therefore fired him, and then immediately proceeded to fire Wade also.
  - Firing verdict:
    - Trump went ballistic at the men's team, using numerous curse words to describe their performance and mockingly impersonating Gene's bad presentation.
    - Trump continuously questioned Wade as to why Anand and Steuart were not chosen as emcees.
    - David accused Steuart and Anand of volunteering to oversee the models' outfits because they wanted to sexually harass them, causing outrage among his teammates.
    - While David's efforts weren't nearly as bad as Gene's, he was strongly criticized for walking off the stage and not helping Gene when he started struggling. Wade was also heavily criticized when it was revealed that there had been no rehearsal due to Gene's lack of preparation, and Trump told Wade that he should have replaced Gene with Anand or Steuart at that point.
    - Anand and Steuart's outfitting choices for the models were agreed to have been the sole positive aspect of Octane's show.
- Fired: Gene Folkes and Wade Hanson for the following reasons:
  - Gene Folkes – for not doing a rehearsal, his dreadful performance as emcee, lousy presentation skills, and for telling Trump that he should be fired for that.
  - Wade Hanson – for lousy leadership, making a terrible and fatal choice of having Gene as the emcee, not making Gene do a rehearsal, and for having a poor track record throughout the interview process.
- Notes:
  - David co-hosted part of Octane's event.
  - In an unusual move, Trump sent the women out of the boardroom before discussing the men's results.
  - Gene and Wade each had their own taxi for their exit interviews, unlike previous multiple-firings where all the fired candidates had to share the same taxi.
  - There was no shot of Gene or Wade getting in their taxi. After Gene and Wade got on the elevator down, it cut right to the men returning to the suite.
  - This is the last time Fortitude won a task until task 11. After this episode, Fortitude will have five losses in a row.

=== Episode 6: Pedicab Confessions ===
- Airdate: October 21, 2010
- Task scope: To run a pedicab ride in New York City.
- Fortitude project manager: Kelly
- Octane project manager: Anand
- Judges: Donald Trump; Ivanka Trump; Eric Trump
- Winning team: Octane
- Reasons for win: Although David continued to be a burden to his team, Octane had a creative Roman theme and selected Trump Tower as their prime location, which had provided many tourists. They earned $950.
- Reward: Anand gets to sit down with the CEO of Fandango and DailyCandy.
- Losing team: Fortitude
- Reasons for loss: Although the team tried to make money from wealthy business workers, their terrible location (Wall Street) and their lack of sales led to their loss. Things were made worse by the fact that Kelly and Mahsa badly failed the pedicab test, removing Fortitude's numerical advantage over Octane (they could otherwise have operated five pedicabs to the men's three). They had a total profit of $320, losing by $630.
- Sent to boardroom: Kelly, Liza, and Stephanie
- Fired: Kelly Smith Beaty – for her poor leadership skills, taking no responsibility for the location, for bringing Liza back instead of Mahsa and for not even being able to participate in the task after failing the pedicab test.
- Notes:
  - It was revealed in episode nine that Anand had contacted some of his friends during this task and asked them to hire Octane's pedicab service for a considerably higher fee than normal. No-one took Anand up on the offer, and would not have made any difference anyway since Octane made almost triple the income of their competitors, but this did not save Anand from being fired when Trump found out.
  - David and Clint had a fierce argument in the boardroom prior to the task results being announced, and Clint asked Trump to fire David even if Octane won. Steuart and Anand called David "The Virus" because of his disruptions. Trump acknowledged that David was clearly proving a hindrance to the team, but said that his hands were tied if they won the task (which they did).
  - Trump hinted that Kelly should have targeted Mahsa and not Stephanie in the boardroom, since Mahsa is a native New Yorker and should have known that Wall Street would be a bad location, while Stephanie is based in Chicago (and originally from Canada).
  - A problem with Kelly's microphone rendered her barely audible for nearly the entire boardroom meeting. A post-credits caption apologized for this.
  - On Fortitude's sales event, Masha & Stephanie became very infuriated when Kelly gave credit to Poppy & Brandy for having strong sales abilities, by bringing the remarks to Eric Trump as he stopped by to check-in. Poppy and Brandy felt Mahsa and Stephanie were being selfish for not allowing others to have credit.

=== Episode 7: Broadway Boardroom ===
- Airdate: October 28, 2010
- Task scope: To prepare a backer's audition for a Broadway play or musical. The winner will be decided on by a panel containing John Yonover, Daryl Roth, and Broadway, film and TV star Kristin Chenoweth
- Fortitude project manager: Liza
- Octane project manager: Steuart
- Judges: Donald Trump; Ivanka Trump; Donald Trump Jr.
- Winning team: Octane
- Reasons for win: Despite the fact that Steuart stumbled the ending of his presentation, the team's marketing material was clever and their musical was executed almost perfectly. Against all odds, most of the credit went to David, who steered the team away from the more formal presentation they initially intended to make and took charge of the creative side of the task.
- Reward: Steuart gets to sit down with Larry Young, the CEO of Snapple.
- Losing team: Fortitude
- Reasons for loss: Despite the fact that the musical was great (albeit slightly disjointed), and Kristin personally praised Liza, they made a fatal mistake: the contact information was not on their team's marketing material.
- Sent to boardroom: No final boardroom - Prior to the results announcement, Trump asked Liza that if her team lost (which they did) about who she would be bringing back with her to the boardroom, she answered Mahsa and Stephanie, mainly because of their responsibility of failing to include the contacts information on their marketing materials, which was the main reason they lost the task. However, before any further discussions were made about the task, issues about Mahsa's previous actions in the pedicab task were brought up to light. Early in the boardroom it emerged that prior to the boardroom in the previous task, Mahsa had told the men how much money the women had made from their pedicab service. Mahsa did not deny this, but argued that Clint first told her how much the men had made. This led to the men coming back into the boardroom and a lengthy argument took place; Mahsa claimed that he had told her Octane's number first, while Clint said that Mahsa gave him Fortitude's sales figure without being asked, and that Clint did not give Mahsa any specific number (which Steuart backed him up on). This changing the course of the discussion dramatically and eventually resulting in Trump firing Mahsa on the spot (with team Octane also present) without the need of a final boardroom.
- Fired: Mahsa Saeidi-Azcuy – for disclosing the amount that Fortitude had made in last task to the other team. While Trump felt that Liza and Stephanie were mainly at fault for the failure of this task, he considered Mahsa's actions to be a sign of either very poor judgement or active disloyalty to her team, and grounds for termination of her candidacy.
- Notes:
  - Liza was strongly criticized for stepping up as project manager on a task that would have been better suited to Stephanie. Stephanie also got into trouble herself when she couldn't clearly explain why she didn't put herself forward as project manager, and while Trump eventually accepted her reasoning (that Liza and Brandy still had yet to be project managers), the inarticulate nature of her response left him distinctly unimpressed.

=== Episode 8: Dressed to Kill ===
- Airdate: November 4, 2010
- Task scope: Create a four-page advertorial for the Donald J. Trump fashion line at Macy's.
- New Fortitude Team: Anand, David, Poppy, and Stephanie
- New Octane Team: Brandy, Clint, Liza, and Steuart
- Fortitude project manager: David
- Octane project manager: Brandy
- Judges: Donald Trump; Donald Trump Jr.; Eric Trump
- Winning team: Octane
- Reasons for win: The Macy's executives liked Octane's risky approach. The colors and model pictures were impressive. They liked the use of Steuart and Brandy in the actual advertorial, and felt that the presentation itself was fantastic.
- Reward: A sitdown with Terry J. Lundgren, the chairman of Macy's. Their ad will also be used as part of a marketing campaign for the Donald J. Trump Signature Collection at Macy's.
- Losing team: Fortitude
- Reasons for loss: Although the executives liked the brand messaging and the style of the advertorial, Fortitude's advertorial was complicated and unprofessional. Their photos were sloppy and one male model's shirt was too big, but David said "with a face like that who would notice?" and later said that "if I didn't have all those kids at home I'd go gay". The "T" design was solid, but the photos that were also on the back page (designed by Poppy) were too small to show the product placement.
- Sent to boardroom: David, Poppy, and Stephanie
- Fired: David Johnson – for his poor judgements, being a dictator instead of a leader, unable to manage his teammates, along with his lousy PM record of 0–2.

=== Episode 9: Fragrant Disregard ===
- Airdate: November 11, 2010
- Prologue: At the beginning of the episode, Both teams are called into the boardroom for an emergency boardroom meeting with disturbing news from Donald Trump about some blatant actions coming from Anand during the sixth task. Anand initially denies this wrongdoing but in the end admit to it after Trump accused him of lying about it.
- Disqualified: Anand Vasudev - for sending text messages during the Pedicab task, saying "Come to Trump Tower with at least $50 cash. Pretend like you don't know me. Need you to buy a pedicab ride from me or one of my teammates. I'm project manager; I'm getting close to the top." Anand said that no one took him up on his request because it was a working day, but Trump felt it to be proof that Anand's contacts didn't respect him. His violation of the rules, along with the fact that he deliberately lied to Trump and claimed that he didn't do it, resulted in him being fired instantly. Moreover, Anand wasn't even given a taxi ride, and was told to make his own way home. This is the first time in Apprentice history that somebody has cheated like this, and thus was fired (disqualified) prior to the week's task.
- Task Scope: Create an in-store display to promote Kim Kardashian's new perfume.
- Corporate shuffle: Trump moved Liza to Fortitude to keep the team symmetrical.
- Fortitude project manager: Poppy
- Octane project manager: Clint
- Judges: Donald Trump; Ivanka Trump; Donald Trump Jr.
- Winning team: Octane
- Reasons for win: Kim Kardashian liked the clean and professional look of the display, and specifically liked how the soft pink background complemented the perfume bottles.
- Reward: A meeting with Barry Sternlicht, the founder of Starwood Capital Group. At this meeting, Clint received a $5,000 gift card to Pier 1 Imports from Mr. Trump.
- Losing team: Fortitude
- Reasons for loss: The executives, along with Trump and Kim, all felt that Fortitude's display was cheap, cheesy, tacky and juvenile. They also felt that it did not portray a glamorous approach to her perfume with having sequins, boas, glitter, and sparkles. The executives did like Kardashian's portrait on the perfume bottle.
- Sent to boardroom: No final boardroom
- Fired: Poppy Carlig – for leading the task with the tacky display, not taking ownership of the Kardashian portrait (although it was actually Stephanie's idea), and for not defending herself.

=== Episode 10: Must-see Mobile TV ===
- Airdate: November 18, 2010
- Task scope: Create and produce a 30-second commercial for AT&T mobile TV and FLOTV.
- Fortitude project manager: Stephanie
- Octane project manager: Steuart
- Judges: Donald Trump; Ivanka Trump; Donald Trump Jr.
- Winning team: Octane
- Reasons for win: Despite Brandy's mediocre presentation and inconsistency of branding, Clint's "epiphany" carried the day as the commercial was spot on with multiple accurate demographics and also that it branded the names quickly. Brownie points for showing an actual AT&T location.
- Reward: A meeting with Cathie Black, Chairman of Hearst Magazines and New York's recently appointed School's Chancellor.
- Losing team: Fortitude
- Reasons for loss: Despite the fact that Stephanie had a great presentation, the executives disliked the fact that the commercial featured people in a business meeting watching television on their phones. Trump also added that it took too long for the viewer to know the brand they were promoting.
- Sent to boardroom: No final boardroom
- Fired: Stephanie Castagnier – for having no ability to control Liza and for producing an unairable commercial.

=== Episode 11: Driving Miz-rahi ===
- Airdate: November 25, 2010
- Task scope: Write, direct, produce and star in a live sales segment on QVC.
- New changes: Trump moves Brandy to Fortitude.
- Fortitude project manager: Liza
- Octane project manager: Clint
- Judges: Donald Trump; Juan Betancourt; Catherine Roman
- Results: Fortitude selects the watch which it prices at $69.55, and Octane selects the handbag which it prices at $194.97.
- Issues: When Liza looked at the QVC viewers, she was told that 85% of the viewers were Caucasian. Liza found out that she wouldn't do well in the sales segment; despite the fact that Brandy would do well since she's Caucasian. Trump confirmed that race is a little bit of an issue dealing with a Caucasian versus African on the census.
- Winning team: Fortitude
- Reasons for win: The profit from sales was over $800 more than Octane's. They earned $2,998.38 and sold 77 watches.
- Losing team: Octane
- Reasons for loss: While their on-air segment was great and Clint's negotiation strategies got them both of their desired points, both Mizrahi and Trump agreed that the price was too high. They earned $2,174.25 and sold only 25 handbags.
- Sent to Boardroom: No Final Boardroom
- Fired: Steuart Martens – due to credentials and experience. Both of Clint's and Steuart's credentials appealed to Trump, as did Steuart's metropolitan style. However, Trump determined Clint's credentials along with his life experience made him a better candidate to be The Apprentice than Steuart.

=== Episode 12: Tee'd Off ===
- Airdate: December 2, 2010
- Prologue: With the final three remaining, the contestants face Donald Trump and plead their cases. One of them will be fired.
- Fired: Liza Mucheru-Wisner - According to Trump, Liza was the weakest of the three left. She also has to improve her ability to get along with others. Trump commented that the person Liza appeared to get along best with was Trump himself.
- Brandy's task: Organize a VIP Golf Tournament featuring Kathy Griffin.
- Brandy's team: Anand, Stephanie and Liza
- Clint's task: Organize a Liza Minnelli concert and Tournament Dinner.
- Clint's team: Steuart, Mahsa and Poppy
- Judges: Donald Trump, Donald Trump Jr, Ivanka Trump
- Issues of Brandy's team: Brandy's team bought golf sets and prizes, and they even put Trump's own team at a disadvantage by misallocating team members. After that, the photographer was going to show up but he was at a different golf course. It was at Trump National Bedminster Golf.
- Issues of Clint's team: A number of caterers was going to show up but Clint and Steuart got emails and it said that the caterers won't do it. However, one caterer in a phone call will show up. When they got their banners, things came quite a shock: Liza's last name is spelled wrong. Mahsa called the team's graphic designer and the designer says that it needs a $200 charge requirement. They spent $4,000 and have one thousand dollars credit left. Not only that, Liza's last name is misspelled on the banner and on each of the individual placement flyers that would go on the dinner tables.

=== Episode 13: Welcome to the Club - Season Finale ===
- Airdate: December 9, 2010
- Note: This is a continuation of the episode Tee'd Off from the week prior. This is also the final episode, and also the first time in which the finale is not live.
- Trump's Thoughts: Trump asked the fired candidates as to who should be hired between Brandy and Clint. Steuart & Mahsa chose Clint. But Liza, Stephanie, Anand, and Poppy (despite being on Clint's team) chose Brandy.
- Fired: Clint Robertson – despite an overall strong performance throughout the season, Trump felt that he was simply not as good of a fit for his organization as Brandy was.
- Hired: Brandy Kuentzel – for her presentation skills, and her generally very solid and consistent track record throughout the season.
- Notes: This is the first season where the finale was not part of a live show (NBC chose not to order a live show, presumably due to low ratings). Two separate boardrooms were shot with Clint winning in one, and Brandy winning in the other. The contestants did not know who had indeed won until the episode was aired. There also was no preview for the upcoming season of Celebrity Apprentice. One final interesting note is that Brandy was never told "You're Hired."
