= Andy Dean =

American radio host (born 1981)

Andy Litinsky
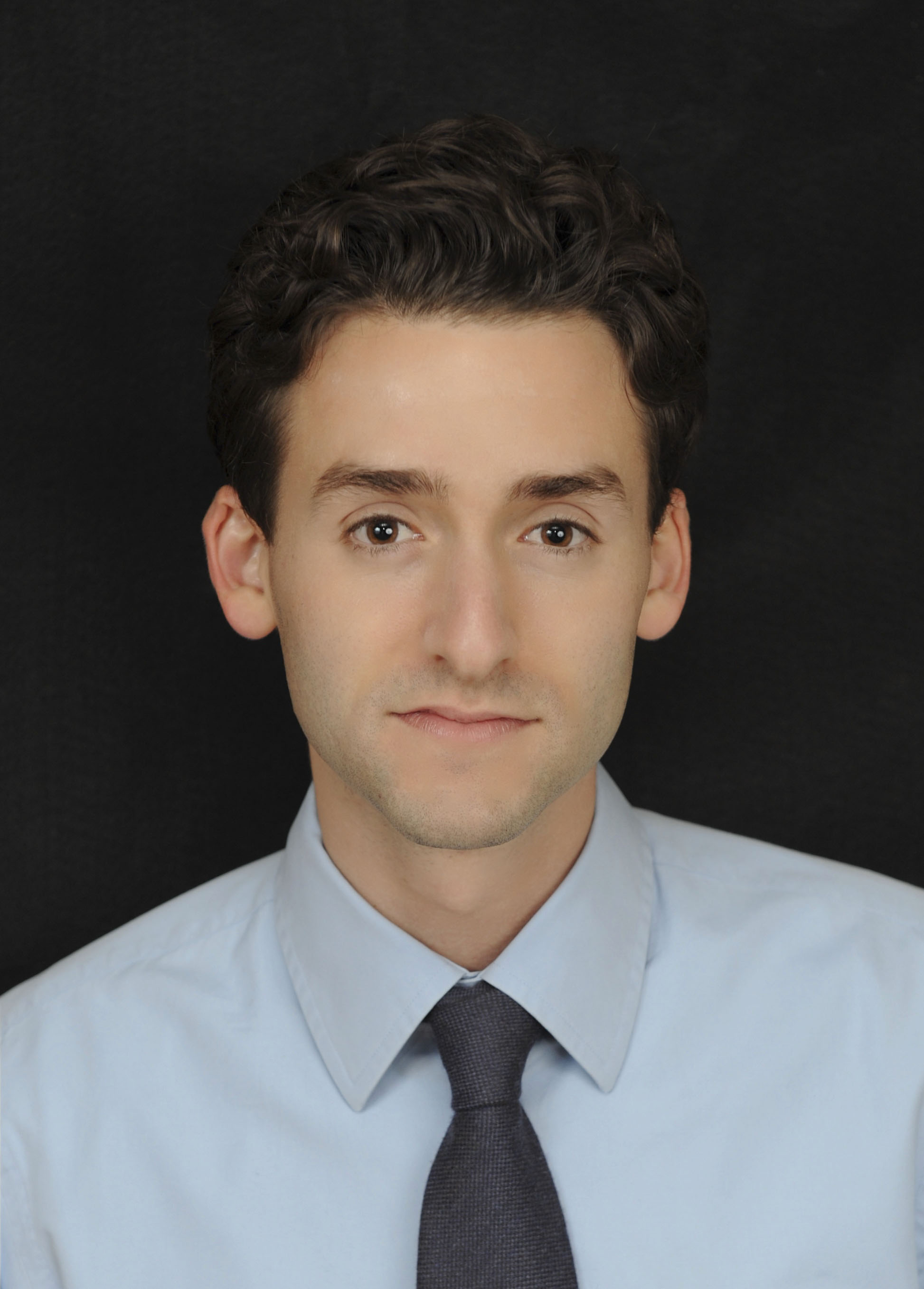
- Dean in 2011
- Born: Andrew Dean Litinsky; June 11, 1981 (age 45); Boynton Beach, Florida, U.S.
- Education: Harvard University (BA)
- Presenting career
- Show: Andy Dean Show
- Style: Political talk and news
- Country: United States

Andrew Dean Litinsky (born June 11, 1981) is an American nationally syndicated radio talk show host, political commentator, and media executive. He is a former The Apprentice contestant, and the brother of MP Materials CEO James H. Litinsky.

Litinsky is a co-founder of Trump Media & Technology Group, with Wes Moss and co-founder of ZideLitinsky Media with film producer Warren Zide, producer of film franchises including American Pie and Final Destination.

== Early life and education ==
Litinsky is Jewish. He graduated from Pine Crest School in Fort Lauderdale, Florida, in 2000; while in high school he placed first in the U.S. National Debate Championships in Extemporaneous Commentary Speaking. In 2004, he graduated with honors from Harvard University with a degree in government. While attending Harvard, Litinsky worked for Rick Davis, former political advisor to Senator John McCain.

== The Apprentice and Donald Trump ==
Litinsky appeared on the second season of The Apprentice in 2004. He was fired in week 12. In 2006, he was hired by Donald Trump to run his production company, Trump Productions.

As the president of Trump Productions, Litinsky produced television shows with Trump, such shows include, Pageant Place on MTV, the Comedy Central Roast of Donald Trump, and Ultimate Merger on TV One.

In February 2021, Litinsky and Wes Moss, who also appeared on season two of The Apprentice, founded Trump Media & Technology Group (TMTG), with the suggestion of creating a social network, which later was launched as Truth Social in February 2022. Litinsky left the company in 2022.

In February 2024, United Atlantic Ventures (UAV), a partnership between Litinsky and Moss, sued TMTG for attempting to dilute their ownership stake by increasing the authorized stock from 120 million to 1 billion shares, thus lowering the value of UAV's shares from 8.6 percent to less than 1 percent. The lawsuit mentions that Trump attempted to pressure Litinsky into giving his shares to Melania Trump and then, when he refused, tried to oust Litinsky. In March 2024, Trump sued Litinsky and Moss for forfeiture of their stock, saying they mishandled and attempted to block attempts to take TMTG public for nearly two years.

Litinsky and Moss won the ability to sell their stake in Trump Media & Technology Group in Delaware Federal Court on September 6, 2024 after they were granted summary judgment by Federal Court Judge Gregory B. Williams. UAV, Litinsky, and Moss prevailed over a stock transfer company, Odyssey Transfer and Trust Company.

In September 2024, UAV sold most of its common stock in TMTG, approximately 11 million shares, which according to CNBC, was worth between $128 million and $170 million.

== America Now ==
America Now with Andy Dean debuted on August 8, 2011. The nationally syndicated radio show discussed politics, business, entertainment, and technology. It aired weekdays from 6pm to 9pm EDT. The program aired nationally in Premiere Radio Networks syndicated 'Big 4' lineup with Glenn Beck, Rush Limbaugh, and Sean Hannity. Prior to the show, The Andy Dean Program was broadcast on WSB in Atlanta, Georgia. While at WSB, Dean was one of the most frequently used guest hosts of the Herman Cain radio program, and served as a fill in host for national radio show host, Neal Boortz. Dean stepped down as host in August 2014 to run his show on ConnectPal, a social media site, formed in 2014 but dissolved in 2018. Joe Pagliarulo replaced Dean as interim host.

While host of America Now, Litinsky appeared on NBC's The Today Show, CNBC's Power Lunch, Fox News' America's News HQ and HBO's Real Time with Bill Maher. After leaving America Now, he joined CNN as a Political Analyst and Commentator.
