= Scott Glabe =

Scott Lawrence Glabe is an American attorney and bureaucrat. Since 2025 he has served as a member of the President's Intelligence Advisory Board, advising President Donald J. Trump on classified matters. He is also an officer of Trump Media.

== Early life and education ==
Glabe received his undergraduate degree from Dartmouth College. He also holds a J.D. from Yale Law School and an M.S. in Defense and Strategic Studies from Missouri State University.

== Career ==
From 2015 to 2019, Glabe worked in multiple roles in the U.S. House of Representatives, including serving as staff director of the Permanent Select Committee on Intelligence under then-chairman Devin Nunes.

From 2020 to 2021, Glabe held positions in the first Trump administration in the Office of the White House General Counsel and at the Department of Homeland Security.

In May 2022, Glabe was named general counsel of the Trump Media and Technology Group, which owns Truth Social.

In February 2025, President Donald J. Trump appointed Glabe to the President's Intelligence Advisory Board. He sold significant shares of Trump Media while still serving as one of its officers in late 2025.

Glabe is in the U.S. Navy Reserve.
