= Joe Pags =

American talk show host

- Born: Joseph John Pagliarulo; August 1, 1966 (age 60); Amityville, New York, U.S.
- Occupations: Television and radio talk show host
- Years active: 1989–present

The Joe Pags Show
- Genre: Talk radio
- Running time: Weekdays: 3 hours (ET) (6:00 pm – 9:00 pm)
- Country of origin: United States
- Language: English
- Home station: KTSA, San Antonio
- Syndicates: Compass Media Networks
- Hosted by: Joe Pags
- Original release: present
- Website: www.joepags.com

Joseph John Pagliarulo (born August 1, 1966), also known on the air as Joe Pags, is an American nationally syndicated conservative radio and television talk show host.

== Biography ==
Born in Amityville, New York, Pagliarulo later lived in nearby Copiague. He moved to Lake Worth, Florida, at age seven, and graduated from Santaluces Community High School. By 1988, Pagliarulo became a store president with Domino's Pizza.

Pagliarulo began his radio career in 1989 in Palm Beach County, Florida, then worked primarily in television news, serving in many roles and eventually as the main anchor at WEYI-TV in Saginaw/Flint, Michigan (1994–1996), morning and noon anchor at WWMT in Kalamazoo/Grand Rapids, Michigan (1996–1997), main anchor, managing editor and eventually news director at WLAJ in Lansing/Jackson, Michigan (1997–2002) and main anchor at WRGB in Schenectady, New York (2002–2005). During and after his time at WRGB he also served as talk show host at WHAM in Rochester, New York and WXDX (now WDTW) in Detroit, Michigan.

In 2005, Pagliarulo transitioned to talk radio. He began his weekday talk show that was first heard on iHeartMedia's talk radio station WOAI 1200 in San Antonio, Texas. It was also carried by KPRC Houston, KEX Portland, KHOW Denver, and KTLK Minneapolis. After Andy Dean's departure from America Now in 2014, Pagliarulo's weekday program (now titled The Joe Pags Show) was broadcast to the approximately 130 America Now affiliates for almost a year until a full-time replacement host was selected. After the America Now fill-in period ended, The Joe Pags Show began its own syndication through Compass Media Networks, and is heard on over 160 stations as of August 2022. His show is broadcast live weekdays from 6-9 PM Eastern Time and on tape delay in some of his syndicated markets. He also hosted a weekend nationally syndicated radio talk show through Premiere Networks titled The Weekend with Joe Pags which he stepped down from in 2022. As of July 1, 2025, The Joe Pags Show is based at KTSA radio in San Antonio.

Pagliarulo has appeared on the Fox News Channel, CNN and MSNBC and previously served as a fill-in for Glenn Beck on Beck's television and radio programs. He has won broadcasting awards from the Associated Press, his show is listed in the top 25 of Talkers Magazine's "Heavy Hundred", and his show was named by Newsmax as one of the most influential talk shows in the country.

== Personal life ==
Pagliarulo and his wife Jenny live in Texas with their five daughters, one of whom was adopted from China.

In May 2011, Pagliarulo underwent surgery for testicular cancer and has since reported a complete recovery.

On September 2, 2016, Pagliarulo reported that his daughter had been missing since August 31. His request for help was spread across news and social media sites including Facebook and Twitter, and she was found the next day in Mexico accompanied by a 29-year-old male who was arrested on multiple charges. Pagliarulo promised on-air to assist with other missing and exploited persons, and has since given missing person reports and alerts with the assistance of various missing person agencies as part of his talk show.
