= The Jesse Kelly Show =

American radio talk show

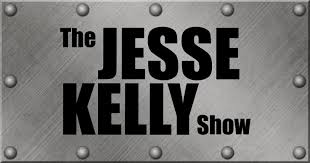
- Genre: Talk radio
- Running time: Weekdays: 3 hours (ET) (6:00 pm – 9:00 pm)
- Country of origin: United States
- Language: English
- Home station: KPRC, Houston
- Syndicates: Premiere Networks
- Hosted by: Andy Dean (2011–2014); Joe Pags (2014–2015); Meghan McCain (2015–2017); Buck Sexton (2017–2021); Jesse Kelly (2021–present)
- Original release: August 8, 2011 – present
- Website: www.jessekellyshow.com

The Jesse Kelly Show (formerly known as America Now and The Buck Sexton Show) is a three-hour early evening conservative talk radio show hosted by Jesse Kelly, and carried by Premiere Networks, a subsidiary of iHeartMedia, Inc. It is broadcast live 9p.m. to 12a.m. Eastern Time on weekdays. The show mainly covers politics, and under former hosts, was intended as a broad-audience rundown of the day's news events, including entertainment topics. It airs on its affiliates either live or on tape delay, along with distribution through the iHeartRadio app and podcast providers.

== History ==
Originally hosted by Andy Dean, America Now debuted on August 8, 2011. Joe Pagliarulo (known as "Joe Pags" and based at WOAI in San Antonio) replaced Dean as interim host beginning August 11, 2014. Pagliarulo ceded hosting duties to Meghan McCain (daughter of Senator John McCain) on July 15, 2015. McCain left the program on January 31, 2017, deciding to focus on television work instead.

Premiere Networks announced on February 1, 2017, that Buck Sexton would become the new host. He began hosting the show on February 6. The show completely abandoned its general audience focus to become a more traditional conservative talk show during his run. In early 2018, the America Now title was removed, and the program was rebranded as The Buck Sexton Show, a title previously used on his radio program with a video simulcast for TheBlaze from 2014 until 2017. Sexton's video simulcast moved to The First TV in October 2019.

On May 27, 2021, Premiere Networks announced that Clay Travis would be teamed with Sexton, and that the two would take over the noon–3 p.m. ET timeslot on June 21, 2021, as The Clay Travis and Buck Sexton Show. The new program serves as the official replacement for The Rush Limbaugh Show, following a transitional period after Rush Limbaugh died on February 17.

On June 28, 2021, Jesse Kelly took over the timeslot under the title The Jesse Kelly Show. Since 2020, Kelly has been based at KPRC in Houston, a station owned by Premiere Networks parent company iHeartMedia, Inc. He had been in limited syndication through Key Networks.

In a December 2021 interview with Tucker Carlson, he criticized President Biden's Vice Chairman of the Joint Chiefs of Staff Christopher W. Grady further stating, "We don't need a military that's woman-friendly, that's gay-friendly; we need men who want to sit on a throne of Chinese skulls."

Senator James Lankford (R-OK), who negotiated a bipartisan border bill on behalf of the Republican caucus over four months from November 2023 to February 2024, said on the floor of the Senate in February that a right-wing media personality had told him, before any contents of the bill had been released to the public, "If you try to move a bill that solves the border crisis during this presidential year, I will do whatever I can to destroy you, because I do not want you to solve this during the presidential election." Lankford added, “[They] have been faithful to their promise and have done everything they can to destroy me in the past several weeks.” Jesse Kelly then asserted on X that he was the person who had threatened Lankford, and called Lankford a eunuch.

In April 2024, Premiere renewed The Jesse Kelly Show into 2027.
