= Trump Media & Technology Group =

American media and technology company

Trump Media & Technology Group Corp.
- Formerly: Trump Media Group Corp.
- Type: Public
- Traded as: Nasdaq: DJT; Russell 2000 component; Nasdaq: DJTWW (warrants)
- ISIN: US25400Q1058
- Industry: Social media; Finance; Blockchain; Technology
- Incorporated: Florida (from April 30, 2025, previously Delaware)
- Founded: February 8, 2021; 5 years ago
- Founders: Andy Litinsky; Wes Moss
- Headquarters: Sarasota, Florida, US
- Key people: Kevin J. McGurn (interim CEO); Boris Epshteyn (chairman); Phillip Juhan (CFO)
- Products: Truth Social
- Revenue: ▼US$3.6 million (2024)
- Operating income: ▼US$−186.0 million (2024)
- Net income: ▼US$−400.9 million (2024)
- Total assets: ▲US$938.3 million (2024)
- Total equity: ▲US$913.6 million (2024)
- Owners: Donald J. Trump Revocable Trust (52%) (Note: Donald Trump is the settlor and sole beneficiary of the trust. Donald Trump Jr. is the trustee with sole voting and investment power.)
- Number of employees: 31 (2025)
- Subsidiaries: T Media Tech LLC; TMTG Sub Inc.
- Website: tmtgcorp.com

DJT stock price reached over $79 per share after its public offering, but declined thereafter.

Since its public offering, Trump Media & Technology Group Corp. has had net operating losses.

Trump Media & Technology Group Corp. (TMTG) is an American media and technology company headquartered in Sarasota, Florida. It runs the Truth Social social-media platform and is majority-owned by the Donald J. Trump Revocable Trust.

Founded by Andy Litinsky and Wes Moss in 2021, it went public on March 26, 2024, after merging with Digital World Acquisition Corp. (DWAC), a special-purpose acquisition company (SPAC).

In December 2025, Trump Media & Technology Group had a market cap of US$3.65 billion. By May 2026, after two quarters reporting large losses (Q4 2025, $605.5m, Q1 2026 $405.9m), the market cap was around $2.47bn. The company said it had ended the year with "$2.1 billion in cash, cash equivalents and short term investments."

== History ==
President Donald Trump was banned from Twitter on January 8, 2021, in response to the January 6 United States Capitol attack. In May, the then-former president unveiled a website, "From the Desk of Donald J. Trump", which he said he would use to spread his thoughts; it was shut down within a month.

Meanwhile, the Trump Media & Technology Group was incorporated in February 2021, and on September 3, 2021, Digital World Acquisition Corp. (DWAC), a special-purpose acquisition company, began trading on the Nasdaq after its IPO of 25 million shares. DWAC was created with the help of ARC Capital, a Shanghai-based firm known for listing Chinese companies on American stock markets and which had been under U.S. Securities and Exchange Commission investigation for misrepresenting shell corporations. The DWAC-Trump venture was linked to China Yunhong Holdings until December 2021, when the lead banker promised to sever ties with China and dissolve Yunhong. In February 2022, Reuters reported that the connection between Shanghai-based ARC Capital and Digital World was more extensive than thought, with ARC having offered money to start the SPAC.

In October 2021, Trump announced that he had created TMTG through a SPAC merger with DWAC that they had entered into a merger agreement to make TMTG a publicly traded company and that they would create a social media company to rival Twitter. DWAC proceeded to raise hundreds of millions of dollars; reporters questioned the ethics and legality surrounding their financial backers and their history with the Securities and Exchange Commission (SEC). There was concern that they may have violated securities law by fundraising off the proposed merger before being officially listed on the stock market. In December 2021, TMTG raised $1 billion in private investment in public equity (PIPE) funding and entered into a technology and cloud services agreement with Rumble, which would operate part of Truth Social and TMTG+, a planned subscription-based streaming service. At the same time, they revealed that the SEC and Financial Industry Regulatory Authority (FINRA) had begun investigating the SPAC's communication with TMTG. The company's board includes Trump's son Donald Trump Jr., Devin Nunes, and former Trump administration officials Robert Lighthizer, Kash Patel, Linda McMahon, and Scott Glabe. Nunes resigned from the U.S. House of Representatives in December 2021 and became the TMTG's chief executive officer in January 2022.

On February 21, 2022, TMTG launched the social network Truth Social. By April 2023, Trump reported earning less than $201 from TMTG. On June 8, 2022, Trump and five others, including Trump Jr., Patel and Glabe left TMTG's board before the SEC and the Manhattan grand jury investigating Trump's business practices issued subpoenas. The grand jury issued subpoenas to the DWAC on June 27 and, along with the SEC, to TMTG on July 1. The board departures were kept secret until they were revealed by the Sarasota Herald-Tribute in July, which TMTG initially denied. In November 2022, the DWAC postponed a vote to complete its merger with TMTG for the 6th time after failing to get the necessary shareholder support. They would extend it again in September 2023, days before it expired.

Throughout 2023, TMTG faced financial and legal difficulties. In March it was reported that New York investigators were looking into whether TMTG had violated anti-money laundering laws by accepting $8 million connected to a Russian oligarch. In July they settled fraud charges brought by the SEC for misleading investors and the SEC and they agreed to pay an $18 million fine upon closing the merger. A November 2023 DWAC financial disclosure expressed substantial doubt about TMTG's ability to meet its financial obligations, showing a $31.5 million loss since inception. On November 21, 2023, TMTG filed a lawsuit seeking $1.5 billion in damages from 20 media outlets for falsely reporting a $73 million loss. Corrected reports showed a net loss of almost $23 million in the first half of 2023 and a total loss of $31.6 million since launch.

On March 22, 2024, DWAC shareholders approved the merger with TMTG, which was completed on March 25, 2024. The combined company began trading under the symbol DJT and finished the day with an $8 billion valuation. In regulatory filings, Lighthizer and McMahon are listed as independent directors. An April 1, 2024, SEC filing revealed that TMTG lost over $58 million in 2023 with only $4 million in advertising revenue from Truth Social. Following criticisms about its auditor, BF Borgers, TMTG fired the firm on May 6, 2024, due to regulatory requirements. In May 2024, the company reported a net loss of $327.6 million for the first quarter of 2024 with $770,500 in revenue. In July 2024, TMTG joined the Russell 1000 and Russell 3000 indexes and raised $105 million through the cash exercise of its warrants. On July 12, 2024, one day before the assassination attempt on Donald Trump, Austin Private Wealth filed a report indicating that it had shorted 12 million shares of TMTG. Four days later, it amended the filing to 1,200 shares and apologized for its "filing error," which spurred conspiracy theories.

As of the close of business on September 23, 2024, the stock's share price had fallen to $12.15, some 84 percent below its March high of $79.38. However, over the following month, it recovered much of this loss. On November 5 (Election Day), trading was halted twice for volatility.

On December 19, 2024, president-elect Donald Trump transferred all of his shares (nearly 115 million) into a trust controlled by his son, Donald Trump Jr. The intent was to reduce conflict of interest. At the time, these shares were worth about $4 billion.

On January 28, 2025, its six directors – Kash Patel, Linda McMahon, Robert Lighthizer, Eric Swider, Kyle Green and Donald Trump Jr. – were awarded nearly 26,000 shares each.

On December 31, 2025, the company set its focuses on social media, financial, blockchain and nuclear fusion.

Lighthizer and Swider resigned from the board in March and April 2026, respectively, and Boris Epshteyn was appointed chairman effective April 30. Also in April 2026, Nunes was replaced with interim CEO Kevin McGurn.

== Truth Social ==
On February 21, 2022, TMTG released Truth Social, a competitor to social-media platforms such as Twitter, on iOS. Truth Social had trouble hiring due to its political associations. In early April 2022, Reuters reported that the company's head of technology and head of product development had resigned after the network's "troubled" launch. On April 22, 2022, Rumble announced that Truth Social had migrated its website and mobile applications to Rumble's cloud infrastructure. In late April 2022, holding company DWAC lost 44% of its stock value after Elon Musk disclosed his large stake in and intent to buy out Twitter. Matthew Kennedy, a market strategist at Renaissance Capital, said a Musk-owned Twitter would undercut the rationale behind Truth Social's existence.

== Truth.Fi and Truth Social ETFs ==
On 30 December 2025, Yorkville America Equities, investment advisor for the Truth Social exchange traded funds (ETFs), announced that the first five Truth Social ETFs were launching on the NYSE. The five funds are:

- Truth Social American Security & Defense ETF (TSSD)
- Truth Social American Next Frontiers ETF (TSNF)
- Truth Social American Icons ETF (TSIC)
- Truth Social American Energy Security ETF (TSES)
- Truth Social American Red State REITs ETF (TSRS)

== Blockchain ==
=== Bitcoin treasury ===
On May 27, 2025, TMTG announced it would create a "bitcoin Treasury" by selling company stock and convertible bonds and buying $2.5 billion of bitcoin. If TMTG's purchase were to go through, TMTG would become the third-largest corporate holder of bitcoin. Two months earlier, Trump had signed an executive order for the United States to create a strategic bitcoin reserve.

=== New cryptocurrency token to shareholders ===
On December 31, 2025, it was announced that Trump Media & Technology Group shareholders will benefit from the issuance of a new cryptocurrency token on Crypto.com’s Cronos blockchain.

== TAE Technologies merger ==
On December 18, 2025, it was reported that TMTG would merge with TAE Technologies, a fusion power company, and that Devin Nunes would be co-CEO of the new company.

== Legal issues ==
=== Trump departure as chairman ===
The Sarasota Herald-Tribune reported in July 2022 that according to Florida state records, Trump left as chairman of TMTG less than a month before the company received subpoenas from the SEC and the New York grand jury, concurrent with the DWAC subpoenas. His son Donald Trump Jr. and Trump administration official Kash Patel were among others who simultaneously left the TMTG board of directors. Truth Social denied the report. Axios later published records filed by TMTG's agent with the Florida Division of Corporations; an April 28 filing showed Trump and others listed as "director," while a June 8 filing to change "person, title or capacity" directed the Division to "remove" Trump and others.

=== Investigation of alleged Russian financial connections and alleged money laundering ===
The Guardian reported in March 2023 that in 2022 the SDNY expanded its criminal investigation to include whether TMTG engaged in money laundering. Beginning in December 2021, when the company was in danger of collapsing because its merger with DWAC had been delayed, it received a loan in two payments totaling $8 million. This included $2 million from Paxum Bank, which is part-owned by Anton Postolnikov, a relation of Aleksandr Smirnov, a former Russian government official who now runs the Russian maritime company Rosmorport. Another $6 million was paid by an ostensibly separate entity, ES Family Trust, which shared a director with Paxum Bank. The $8 million loan was structured to automatically convert into TMTG common equity upon merging with the SPAC – meaning ES Family Trust would gain a stake in TMTG if the merger proceeded – though this was not disclosed to the SPAC investors nor the SEC.

TMTG sued the Guardian, Variety and Will Wilkerson, for reporting on the Paxum affair, the suit was dismissed. TMTG refiled an amended complain, but dropped their suit, without prejudice, in April 2026.

The federal probe into investors of DWAC, according to The Washington Post, discovered that a wealthy investor in the company was allegedly connected to attempts to move assets from Russia, Ukraine, and China into the Caribbean, and other intermediaries such as Hong Kong, the United Kingdom and Belize. According to a government transcript, an informant referenced the process as "the full Singapore with a double dip, as we call it, with having the U.K. thrown in there, just to give it that added cleanliness and polishing off".

=== Lawsuits since 2024 ===
In February 2024, United Atlantic Ventures (UAV), the partnership of TMTG co-founders Andy Litinsky and Wes Moss, sued TMTG for attempting to dilute their ownership stake by increasing the authorized stock from 120 million to 1 billion shares, thus lowering the value of UAV's shares from 8.6 percent to less than 1 percent. The lawsuit mentions that Trump attempted to pressure Litinsky into giving his shares to Melania Trump and then, when he refused, tried to oust Litinsky. The next day, Arc Capital sued the DWAC for trying to strip them of their shares. The judge granted summary judgment to Atlantic Ventures LLC.

In March 2024, DWAC and Trump sued DWAC's former chief executive Patrick Orlando and his firm Arc Global Investments II for extortion and causing DWAC and Trump reputational harm. Orlando and Arc counter-sued DWAC and Trump for miscalculating Arc's stake in TMTG by 2 million shares. On March 24, Trump sued Litinsky and Moss for forfeiture of their stock, saying they mishandled and attempted to block attempts to take TMTG public for nearly two years. The judge ruled in Arc's case that an agreement had been breached and ARC Global had to receive more than half a million additional shares, but ruled against ARC on breach of fiduciary duty claims, and said that Orlando was owed fewer shares than he sought. In January 2025 Arc was granted a pause in litigation in the alleged stock theft lawsuit.

In February 2025, Trump Media and the video platform Rumble filed a lawsuit against a Brazilian supreme court justice, Alexandre de Moraes, who was hearing a case against Bolsonaro, alleging that he violated the right to free speech of a far-right Brazilian influencer living in the US. In July the Trump administration imposed sanctions against Moraes, but dropped them later in the year.

== See also ==
- World Liberty Financial, blockchain technology company co-owned by the Trump family
- Trump Mobile, telecommunications company founded by The Trump Organization in 2025
- American Bitcoin
