= George H. Ross =

American businessman and attorney

George Ross
- Born: January 6, 1928 (age 98); Brooklyn, New York, U.S.
- Education: Stuyvesant High School
- Alma mater: Clemson University; Brooklyn College (BA); Brooklyn Law School (JD)
- Occupations: Executive vice president, senior counsel, business and legal advisor
- Children: 2

George H. Ross (born January 6, 1928) is a former executive vice president and senior counsel of the Trump Organization. He is perhaps best known as one of Donald Trump's two advisors on the NBC reality television program The Apprentice, along with Carolyn Kepcher. On the program, Ross monitored the progress of the contestants and assisted Trump in determining who should be "fired".

== Early life and education ==
Ross was born to a Jewish family in Brooklyn, New York City, and raised in the Bronx. His father died when he was 16. Ross went to Stuyvesant High School and afterward, joined the U.S. Army as a cryptanalyst for one year. He attended Clemson University before transferring and later earned a Bachelor of Arts degree from Brooklyn College before earning a Juris Doctor from Brooklyn Law School.

== Career ==
He was admitted to the New York State Bar Association in 1953. After he passed the bar, he worked in the litigation department for Dreyer & Traub. In 1954, he became the in-house counsel for Goldman-DiLorenzo (founded by Sol Goldman and Alex DiLorenzo). Between 2000 and 2005, Ross was in the supervisory council (Aufsichtsrat) of TD Trump Deutschland, planning to purchase or build a Trump Tower in Germany.

He teaches courses in negotiation and real estate transactions at New York University. He is the author of two books, Trump Strategies For Real Estate and Trump Style Negotiation.

== Personal life ==
As of 2004, Ross lives in Hewlett Harbor, New York, and is married to Billie Ross; they have two children: Nanci and Stephanie. They are also said to have 3 grandchildren from both daughters, who are themselves married.
