= Trump Productions =

American television production company

Trump Productions LLC
- Company type: LLC
- Industry: Television production
- Founded: 2004
- Founder: Donald Trump
- Defunct: 2015
- Headquarters: Los Angeles, California, U.S.
- Products: The Apprentice (American TV series); Pageant Place; Donald J. Trump Presents The Ultimate Merger; The Celebrity Apprentice
- Owner: Donald Trump
- Parent: The Trump Organization
- Website: Official website

Trump Productions LLC was an American television production company founded by Donald Trump as the entertainment division of The Trump Organization. Established in 2004 and based in Los Angeles, California, the company operated until 2015. It produced both network and cable television programming, most notably The Apprentice and The Celebrity Apprentice, in partnership with Mark Burnett Productions.

In addition to its reality television projects, Trump Productions also produced the Miss USA and Miss Universe pageants during Trump's ownership of those franchises. According to financial disclosure reports released during the 2016 presidential campaign, the company was valued at approximately $15 million and generated more than $4 million in revenue in 2015.

Donald Trump served as chairman and chief executive officer of the company throughout its existence.

== Productions ==
- The Apprentice (American TV series) (2004–2015)
- Pageant Place (2007)
- The Celebrity Apprentice (2008–2017)
- Donald J. Trump Presents The Ultimate Merger (2010–2011)

== See also ==
- List of things named after Donald Trump
