= The Apprentice (American TV series) =

American reality competition television series (2004–2017)

- Genre: Reality competition
- Created by: Mark Burnett
- Starring: Donald Trump; Arnold Schwarzenegger; George H. Ross; Carolyn Kepcher; Bill Rancic; Ivanka Trump; Donald Trump Jr.; Eric Trump; Sean Yazbeck
- Theme music composer: Kenneth Gamble; Leon Huff; Anthony Jackson
- Opening theme: "For the Love of Money" by The O'Jays
- Country of origin: United States
- Original language: English
- No. of seasons: 15
- No. of episodes: 194

Production
- Producers: Mark Burnett; Donald Trump; Arnold Schwarzenegger (2017)
- Production locations: Trump Tower, New York City (2004–2015)
- Running time: 60 minutes (seasons 1–7, 10); 120 minutes (seasons 8–9, 11–15)
- Production company: Trump Productions; (2004–2015); (seasons 1–14); Mark Burnett Productions; (2004–2011); (seasons 1–11); One Three Media; (2012–2013); (seasons 12–13); United Artists Media Group; (2015); (season 14); MGM Television; (2017); (season 15)

Original release
- Network: NBC
- Release: January 8, 2004 – February 13, 2017

Related
- The Celebrity Apprentice; The Apprentice: Martha Stewart; The Ultimate Merger; The Apprentice (British TV series)

The Apprentice is an American reality television series that judged the business skills of a group of contestants. It ran in various formats across 15 seasons on NBC from 2004 to 2017. The Apprentice was created by British television producer Mark Burnett, and was co-produced by Donald Trump, who was the show's host for the first 14 seasons.

Billed as "The Ultimate Job Interview", seven of the show's seasons featured aspiring, but otherwise unknown, businesspeople who would vie for the show's prize, a one-year $250,000 starting contract to promote one of Donald Trump's properties. The show features 14 to 18 such business people who compete over the course of the season, with typically one contestant eliminated per episode. Contestants are split into two "corporations" (teams), with one member from each volunteering as a project manager on each new task. The corporations complete business-related tasks such as selling products, raising money for charity, or creating an advertising campaign, with one corporation selected as the winner based on objective measures and subjective opinions of the host and the host's advisors who monitor the teams' performance on tasks. The losing corporation attends a boardroom meeting with the show's host and their advisors to break down why they lost and determine who contributed the least to the team. Episodes ended with the host eliminating one contestant from the competition, with the words, "You're fired!"

There have also been eight seasons of The Celebrity Apprentice since 2008. In this format, several celebrities would participate to win money for their chosen charities, with the final prize being a large donation to the celebrity's charity and the title of "Apprentice". A reboot of this format, The New Celebrity Apprentice, aired in January 2017. The American series originated an international TV show franchise, counting over 20 local The Apprentice TV series aired.

NBC cut ties with Trump after disagreement with remarks he made about Mexican immigrants during his announcement that he was running for president of the United States on June 16, 2015. It was announced in September 2015 that actor and former California governor Arnold Schwarzenegger would become the new host of The Celebrity Apprentice, starting January 2017. Lifestyle mogul Martha Stewart hosted a one-season spin-off titled The Apprentice: Martha Stewart in 2005.

== Format ==
The Apprentice is a reality competition show featuring season-long competitions. Each season begins with a new group of contestants vying to earn a place in one of the organizations run by the host. The contestants (who are referred to as "candidates") have come from business backgrounds in various enterprises, the backgrounds including real estate, accounting, restaurant management, management consulting, sales and marketing.

During the show, the contestants live in a communal dwelling, a "penthouse suite", in New York City (save for Season 6 which took place in Los Angeles). The candidates are divided into two teams, treated as "corporations" within the show. These corporations select a name they are subsequently referred to through the rest of the show. Each week, the teams are assigned a task and required to select one of their members to lead the team as "project manager", who is to take responsibility for organizing the team and making executive decisions. Tasks are generally business oriented and tend to highlight one of several business skills. Tasks most commonly revolve around sales (selling the most items or earning the most money) and marketing (producing a specific marketing material or campaign that is judged by a company's executives). During the tasks, the teams are usually visited by one of the host's "advisors" for that week. Tasks typically last for one or two days. After the completion of the task, the teams meet with the host and the two advisers in "the boardroom".

Boardroom meetings on The Apprentice typically unfold in three stages. In the first stage, all remaining candidates from both teams gather in the boardroom, where the host and advisors brief them on the task. The team members discuss how the task went, identifying strong or weak performers, and may be asked to comment on the opposing team's materials or products. At the conclusion of this stage, the host or advisors reveal the task results and announce the winning team, who are rewarded with a luxurious experience and excused from the boardroom. In later seasons, the winning team is allowed to observe the next boardroom stage via a television in their suite.

The second stage focuses on the losing team, who return to the boardroom to face scrutiny over their performance. The team is questioned about the reasons for their loss and which members were responsible. The project manager is then asked to select a certain number of teammates (usually two, but occasionally one or three) to accompany them to the final stage, while the remaining teammates are sent back to the suite. The project manager and selected teammates step out briefly as the host consults with the advisors.

In the final stage, the host and advisors continue interrogating the remaining candidates, often probing the project manager's decision about whom to bring back. Ultimately, at least one person—either the project manager or a teammate—is "fired" or "terminated" at the host's discretion, leaving the show. The host may also exercise the option to fire multiple candidates or dismiss someone on the spot before the final stage. The eliminated contestant is shown leaving the boardroom with their luggage and entering a taxi, reflecting on their elimination during the episode's closing credits.

When only three or four candidates (depending on the season) are left, they are interviewed rather than being assigned a task. Executives from various companies interview the finalists and report their assessments to the host. Based on the interviews, a "boardroom meeting" and firing take place, leaving two candidates.

The final two candidates are then each assigned a different final task. Each is given a support team of previously fired candidates. Final tasks generally require the finalists to organize (to various degrees) an event such as a party or a fundraiser which has multiple planning elements. In a final boardroom meeting following the final task, the host "hires" one of the two candidates to become the host's "apprentice", winning the show's prize of a one-year $250,000 starting contract to manage a business project offered by the host.

== History and production ==
After experiencing a series of financial setbacks in the early 1990s, New York real-estate developer Donald Trump changed his business strategy from borrowing to build and purchase assets, to licensing his name to others. Producer Mark Burnett approached Trump about a new television show. Although Trump was skeptical, stating that reality television "was for the bottom-feeders of society", Burnett proposed that Trump appear as himself, a successful businessman with a luxurious lifestyle.

The show was co-produced by Burnett and Trump, its first season airing in early 2004. The premise of the show, which bills itself as the "ultimate job interview" in the "ultimate jungle", is to conduct a job talent search for a person to head one of Trump's companies. The position starts with an introductory one-year contract with a starting yearly salary of $250,000.

The popularity of the show led to Trump becoming known for his fateful catchphrase, "You're fired!" and for the emergence of "Trumponomics", a "portmanteau of Donald Trump and economics initially spelled 'Trump-Onomics' (2004), [which] started out as a bland managerial concept on cable TV, meant to convey the notion that 'impressing the boss' was the only way to 'climb the corporate ladder'."

The opening theme music used on the show is "For the Love of Money", a 1973 R&B song by The O'Jays.

For most seasons, the candidates ostensibly live in a communal suite at Trump Tower in Manhattan. This was originally billed as a penthouse suite, and after boardrooms, candidates were told to "go up" to the suite. However, in reality, the suite and the boardroom (and its elevator lobby) are all purpose-built sets within Trump Tower, all on the same floor. Later seasons of The Celebrity Apprentice no longer conceal this.

The Apprentice was so successful that, according to Trump, he earned $214 million from 14 seasons of the show, plus more from related product licensing as his name as a brand became more valuable. As the popularity of the series grew, more and more of the tasks began to be tied to specific companies. For example, sales tasks would require a team to take over a brand-name storefront or restaurant and operate it; and marketing tasks would require teams to prepare marketing material (e.g. a jingle or flyer) or campaign for an established company. In later series, the launches of specific products would be tied to the airing of episodes of the series. Several companies have appeared multiple times on the show.

Trump's original advisors were Carolyn Kepcher, former chief operating officer and general manager for Trump National Golf Club, and George H. Ross, Executive Vice President and Senior Counsel, the Trump Organization. In August 2006, Trump released Kepcher from her duties at the Trump organization, saying only that he "wishes her the best." Kepcher also left The Apprentice at that time. Upon her departure, Trump's daughter, Ivanka Trump became a regular advisor, though she was not officially billed as a replacement for Kepcher. As the series progressed, the advisors were occasionally substituted on a weekly basis with other advisors including two of Trump's other children, Donald Trump Jr. and Eric Trump, as well as past winners of the show and other business executives (typically from the company whose product or service was featured in the episode).

During Trump's tenure, the series frequently featured and promoted his properties, products and brand. Trump's wife Melania Trump was also featured on the series several times including in several tasks that have featured her fashion and cosmetic products. Ivanka Trump's fashion products have also been featured in tasks.

Trump's on-screen (and real-life) assistants have each grown in personal fame. Two assistants appeared jointly for the first five seasons: Rhona Graff and Robin Himmler. In season six, Trump elected to have his newest executive assistant, Andi Rowntree, star in the LA-based show. For the Celebrity Apprentice, Annette Dziamba appeared for the seventh season, and Amanda Miller since the eighth season.

Season six, unlike the rest of the series, took place in Los Angeles. The teams resided in a mansion, with the winning team of each challenge occupying the house, and the losing team camping out in tents in the backyard.

On May 14, 2007, the series was left off NBC's schedule, but NBC Entertainment president Kevin Reilly said he was still in discussions with Mark Burnett and Trump. On May 19, 2007, Trump announced that he was "moving on from The Apprentice to a major new TV venture". On May 22, NBC announced The Apprentice might return next season even though Trump had said he had quit. However, NBC and Trump resolved their differences, and the first season of The Celebrity Apprentice began production shortly thereafter.

On January 17, 2017, Summer Zervos filed a defamation lawsuit against Trump, arising from his statement that she had lied about her allegations of Trump's sexual misconduct toward her. Zervos had been a contestant on the fifth season of The Apprentice, which filmed in 2005 and aired in 2006. Zervos contacted Trump in 2007, about a job after the show's completion, and he invited her to meet him at the Beverly Hills Hotel. Zervos said that Trump exhibited aggressive and non-consensual sexual advances during their meeting, kissing her open-mouthed, groping her breasts, and thrusting his genitals on her. In November 2021, Zervos dropped her lawsuit against Trump.

After his non-disclosure agreement expired in 2024, Bill Pruitt, one of the four producers of the first two seasons of The Apprentice, revealed that Trump's appearances were heavily edited in post-production. On location, Pruitt noted, "he could barely put a sentence together about how a task would work" and often struggled to remember contestants' names. Post-production editing enhanced his dialogue, feeding him lines to make him appear "articulate and concise." Additionally, Trump's actual offices were too cramped and the furniture too shabby for a show meant to "demonstrate impeccable business instincts and unparalleled wealth." As a result, the production team rented vacant Trump Tower retail space from Trump and constructed the illusion of a luxurious reception area and boardroom.

In March 2023, it was reported that Rupert Murdoch had considered acquiring the rights to the show from NBC following the former president's 2020 defeat to Joe Biden but the deal did not proceed for fear that Trump would "kill" the reality series by turning it into a full-time campaign vehicle for himself.

Reruns of The Apprentice began in 2025 on Prime Video after Amazon bought out Metro-Goldwyn-Mayer.

=== Series overview ===
Key:

Host
Board member
Guest board member
Contestant

Cast	1	2	3	4	5	6	7	8	9	10	11	12	13	14	15
Donald Trump															
Arnold Schwarzenegger															
George H. Ross															
Carolyn Kepcher															
Bill Rancic															
Ivanka Trump															
Donald "Don" Trump Jr.															
Sean Yazbeck															
Eric Trump															
Joan Rivers															
Tyra Banks															
Patrick M. Knapp Schwarzenegger															

== Spin-offs ==
The Apprentice also spawned a reality television dating game show. On June 17, 2010, Donald J. Trump Presents The Ultimate Merger premiered on TV One. The series stars Omarosa Manigault-Stallworth, a former political consultant who in 2004 appeared on the first season of The Apprentice and in 2008 on the first celebrity edition of the show and also in season 13. Each of the twelve contestants vying for the affections of Manigault-Stallworth were selected by Trump himself.

Following Trump's election as president in 2016, Burnett kept in touch with Trump about additional television shows, and at one point, Burnett proposed the idea of The Apprentice: White House, which would have been filmed following Trump's departure from office and would have been focused on political activities. However, no firm plans were established for this.

=== Martha Stewart ===
On February 2, 2005, NBC announced that they would broadcast the first spin-off from The Apprentice, called The Apprentice: Martha Stewart. The show, which ran from September 21 to December 21, 2005, was hosted by Martha Stewart, who was the first woman in the world to become a self-made billionaire. It kept the format of the original series but changed a few elements to fit Stewart's personality. Trump was one of the executive producers of the show and castings were held in 27 cities across the United States.

At the time, the original Apprentice was airing new seasons in each of the fall and winter, each with declining overall ratings. The Apprentice: Martha Stewart aired on Wednesdays during the same fall season as the fourth season of the original Apprentice (which aired Thursdays). The Apprentice: Martha Stewart struggled while the original series' fourth season again earned poorer ratings than the previous season. Trump claimed that there was "confusion" between the two shows. There has also been talk that Trump did not want Stewart to host the spin-off show. NBC announced that it would not bring back the show for a second season, although the network stressed that the show was initially planned to air only for one season. The show averaged between six and seven million viewers. Before Stewart's show ended, Trump and Stewart had a fight over Stewart accusing Trump that he did not want her to have a successful show, that he might have wanted it jinxed. Trump denied this charge, and both TV stars have not worked together again, and there are no plans for the future.

== Statistics by season ==
Seasonal rankings (based on average total viewers per episode) of The Apprentice on NBC.

Note: Each U.S. network television season started in late September and ends in late May, which coincides with the completion of May sweeps.

Season	Winner	Winner's project	Timeslot	Season premiere	Season finale	TV season	Ranking	Viewers (in millions)	Finale viewers (in millions)
1	Bill Rancic	Trump Tower Chicago	Thursday 9:00 pm	January 8, 2004	April 15, 2004	2003–04	7	20.7	28.1
2	Kelly Perdew	Trump Place	Thursday 9:00 pm	September 9, 2004	December 16, 2004	2004–05	11	16.1	16.9
3	Kendra Todd	Palm Beach Mansion	Thursday 9:00 pm	January 20, 2005	May 19, 2005	2004–05	15	14.0	14.0
4	Randal Pinkett	Trump Entertainment	Thursday 9:00 pm	September 22, 2005	December 15, 2005	2005–06	38	11.0	12.8
5	Sean Yazbeck	Trump SoHo	Monday 9:00 pm	February 27, 2006	June 5, 2006	2005–06	51	9.7	11.3
6	Stefanie Schaeffer	Cap Cana	Sunday 10:00 pm	January 7, 2007	April 22, 2007	2006–07	75	7.5	10.6
10	Brandy Kuentzel	San Francisco Golf Tournament	Thursday 10:00 pm	September 16, 2010	December 9, 2010	2010–11	113	4.7	4.5

(Note: Given the show has a sequel TV series known as Celebrity Apprentice, the above chart is continued on the article of the show's follow-up TV series, found under "statistics by season" for Celebrity Apprentice. Note as well that season 10 is included in the above chart given the show reverted to The Apprentice for that season.)

The Apprentice was the breakout rookie hit of the 2003–04 American television season and helped NBC at a time when the network's two long-running successful comedies, Friends and Frasier, were ending their series' runs. The Apprentice filled the void on Thursday nights as NBC held on to the tagline Must See TV, even though CBS was quickly becoming the most-watched network on Thursday night.

Although the series was one of the most-watched programs on NBC in the advertiser-friendly 18–49 age demographic, the franchise's total audience gradually dissolved, starting in late 2004, when it aired its second season culminating in what some Apprentice fans deemed an "overextended" 3-hour season finale on December 16, 2004.

The audience numbers (11.25 million viewers) for the June 5, 2006 fifth-season finale were not factored in the fifth season average because it aired after the official television season ended.

The audience numbers for the show steadily declined following the first season. Originally, NBC aired the sixth season of The Apprentice, competing against both immensely popular series, Desperate Housewives and Cold Case, just a few weeks before competing against Brothers & Sisters and Cold Case.

== Teams by season ==
Season	Team name	Overall record as a team
1	Versacorp	5–7
1	Protégé	7–5
2	Mosaic	8–5
2	Apex	5–8
3	Magna	10–4
3	Net Worth	3–11
4	Capital Edge	4–7
4	Excel	7–4
5	Gold Rush	5–8
5	Synergy	8–5
6	Arrow	5–5
6	Kinetic	5–5
10	Fortitude	4–7
10	Octane	7–4

== Controversies ==
Whereas winners have been named "executive vice presidents", and given the title of "owner's representative", in actuality, they were employed as publicity spokespeople for the Trump Organization. Second season winner Kelly Perdew, on his first day working for Trump, was introduced by his boss to Florida developers working on a Trump-branded condo, the Trump Tower, in Tampa, Florida, where he was told that he would help promote sales of the building by appearing at promotional events.

After Trump began to publicly question whether President Barack Obama was born in the United States, The Apprentice was criticized for its involvement with Trump. Some people publicly called for NBC to fire Trump from his role on The Apprentice. Industry media speculated about the extent to which Trump's media comments may have contributed to the show's ratings decline, given how other Trump-associated businesses have suffered since Trump's political campaign began. One (anonymous) Celebrity Apprentice contestant even announced an intention to boycott the May 15 taping of the season seven finale, unless forced by contract to appear.

Following repeated criticisms from Trump, Arnold Schwarzenegger declined to do another season of The Celebrity Apprentice after only one season—although Trump stated that he was fired.

In 2006, a lawsuit brought by Mark Bethea against the show's producers alleging theft of the original concept was settled on undisclosed terms. Among the lawyers representing Bethea was Michael Avenatti.

On April 9, 2020, U.S. District Judge Lorna Schofield ordered the Trump Organization and Metro-Goldwyn-Mayer to release behind-the-scenes videos of The Apprentice.

== Video games ==
At the Electronic Entertainment Expo on May 17, 2005, Legacy Interactive announced that it had purchased the rights to develop a video game based on The Apprentice. The game was to be released in fall 2005 on the Xbox, PlayStation Portable, and PC. The Apprentice was released for PC on February 28, 2006. The player chooses a character and is then paired up with one of four former Apprentice contestants, including Omarosa. The player must perform well in a series of business tasks, played across 18 minigames, to avoid a boardroom confrontation with Donald Trump and his advisors, George Ross and Carolyn Kepcher.

Alex Navarro of GameSpot rated the game 3 out of 10 and called it a "collection of games that you can play better versions of for free or significantly cheaper elsewhere on the Internet. Not only are these games overly simplistic, they're just not that much fun." Navarro wrote, "Most offensive of all, however, is how cheaply The Apprentice handles its license. This game presents itself horribly. It looks like it was programmed hastily with Macromedia, with all the characters appearing as weirdly drawn cartoon versions of themselves." Navarro also criticized the game's audio clips of Donald Trump, and its short length, noting that the entire game could be completed in 20 minutes.

On February 6, 2007, Legacy announced a new game, The Apprentice: Los Angeles, to be released online and in retail stores during the show's sixth season. The Apprentice: Los Angeles was released on May 1, 2007. The player must serve customers throughout the game's 40 levels, set in four locations. Depending on the player's success throughout the game, the player receives praise and criticism from Donald Trump, Donald Trump Jr., and Ivanka Trump.

Jim Squries of Gamezebo gave the game three and a half stars out of five, and praised the "bright" and "colorful" graphics, as well as the "smooth" controls and diverse gameplay. Squries wrote, "Ultimately, the only disappointment to be found in The Apprentice is the slightly shoddy handling of parts of the license. Trump's audio clips are brief and sound like they were recorded in a tin shack, while the team-based aspects of the show could've been played up more to create additional appeal for fans of the show."

== See also ==
- Television in the United States
- The Celebrity Apprentice
- The Apprentice (British TV series)
- The Apprentice (Irish TV series)
- The Apprentice : Qui décrochera le job ? (French TV series)
- The Apprentice — a 2024 independent biographical drama examining Trump's making a career as a real estate businessman and highlighting his relationship with attorney Roy Cohn.
- Media career of Donald Trump
