= Carolyn Kepcher =

American businesswoman (born 1969)

- Born: January 30, 1969 (age 57); New Rochelle, New York, U.S.
- Education: Mercy College (BA)
- Occupations: Formerly the vice president and general manager of the Redding Country Club

Carolyn Kepcher (/ˈkɛpʃər/; born January 30, 1969) is an American businesswoman who was one of the judges on the NBC television program The Apprentice. She was formerly the Executive Vice President, chief operating officer, for the Trump Golf Properties. Before her career with Trump ended in August 2006, she monitored the progress of the contestants on the program and assisted Donald Trump in determining who should be fired.

== Early life ==
Born and raised in New Rochelle, NY. During High School, Kepcher sold Avon Products door-to-door. While studying marketing on a volleyball scholarship at Mercy College, she took a job as a manager at a Manhattan restaurant.

== Career ==
On graduation, in 1992, Kepcher secured a position as sales and marketing director of a golf club outside New York City. Her primary responsibility was to prepare the property for bank auction, where it was eventually sold to Donald Trump. Kepcher's ideas on how best to use the property impressed him, and he hired her as director of sales and marketing in 1994.

=== Trump: 1992–2006 ===
After four years in this capacity, she was named general manager. Her effective management skills convinced Trump of her ability to lead and he later named her the chief operating officer of Trump National Golf Club Westchester in Briarcliff Manor, New York, and subsequently the Trump National Golf Club in Bedminster, New Jersey, overseeing over 250 employees at each location.

In 2004, she wrote a business book, Carolyn 101: Business Lessons From the Apprentice's Straight Shooter (ISBN 0-7432-7022-3) based on her business experience. The book went to No. 2 on The New York Times Best Seller List.

On August 31, 2006, Kepcher's employment at the Trump Organization ended. According to sources who spoke to the New York Post, Trump felt that Kepcher's newfound celebrity status had kept her too busy with speaking engagements and endorsements to focus on her responsibilities for the Trump Organization. Kepcher was replaced on The Apprentice by Ivanka Trump, beginning with Season 6.

=== Post-Trump ===
Kepcher became co-founder and CEO of Carolyn & Co., a company created for the purpose of "providing a broad array of services and assistance to career women."

On November 28, 2006, Kepcher was hired by Microsoft to star in a new reality show, Ultimate Challenge, to find the next best small-business venture. She was to be one of three judges. The contest winner would get $100,000 in seed money, a storefront or other business space in Manhattan rent-free for a year, and software to help get their business started. The pilot show was never completed.

In January 2007, Kepcher provided management skills to the nonprofit world through an affiliation with Graham-Pelton Consulting, Inc., a national leader in fundraising and nonprofit management. Since 2007, she has been a career advice columnist with the New York Daily News.

In 2010, Kepcher was the recipient of the prestigious Toastmasters International Golden Gavel award for Excellence in Communications and Leadership. Kepcher was also the winner of the Stevie Award for Women in Business in the category of "Women Helping Women".

Kepcher is also one of the few non-cast members of Saturday Night Live on NBC to recite the show's opening line "Live from New York, it's Saturday Night!"

Kepcher served on the board of the Back9Network, and on the Advisory board to the 2009 U.S. Women's Open at Saucon Valley Country Club. She served as vice president and general manager of the Aspetuck Valley Country Club.
