= List of The Apprentice (American TV series) candidates =

The Apprentice, later called The Celebrity Apprentice, is an American reality television show created by Mark Burnett in which candidates compete to become Donald Trump's apprentice, as determined by Trump and his boardroom associates. The series first broadcast in 2004, and twelve complete seasons have aired on NBC as of May 2012. Each season, competitors are progressively eliminated based on their performance during an assigned task. After each task, the winning team receives a reward, while the losing team faces a boardroom showdown in order to determine which team member should be fired, and therefore eliminated from the show. Trump hires one of the finalists to be his apprentice. Starting with season 7, celebrities participated as a way to revitalize the series, with the winners donating their proceeds to charity. Trump departed the series after the fourteenth season to focus on his 2016 presidential campaign, with actor and politician Arnold Schwarzenegger then serving as host of the series. The fifteenth season, featuring Schwarzenegger was branded as The New Celebrity Apprentice.

As of season 14, 229 candidates have competed, one of whom has competed three times—Omarosa Manigault-Stallworth competed in both season 1, season 7, and season 13. The youngest competitors include Jessie Connors and Chris Shelton, who appeared on the show at age 21. At age 75, Joan Rivers of season 8 was the oldest candidate to both appear on the show and win the competition. There have been six instances in which a candidate left The Apprentice for reasons other than being eliminated by Trump. Overcome by stress, Verna Felton of season 3 "just packed up and walked out". Michelle Sorro of season 6 quit after determining that the competition was "too much" and "not worth it". Actor Vincent Pastore of season 7 resigned due to a conflict with Piers Morgan. Olympic sprinter Michael Johnson of season 9 quit due to a personal family situation. During season 11, baseball player Jose Canseco quit due to his father's illness and NeNe Leakes left due to a conflict with Star Jones. The fifteen winners of the show, in chronological order, are Bill Rancic, Kelly Perdew, Kendra Todd, Randal Pinkett, Sean Yazbeck, Stefanie Schaeffer, Piers Morgan, Joan Rivers, Bret Michaels, Brandy Kuentzel, John Rich, Arsenio Hall, Trace Adkins (the first All-Star Celebrity Apprentice), Leeza Gibbons, and Matt Iseman.

== Candidates ==
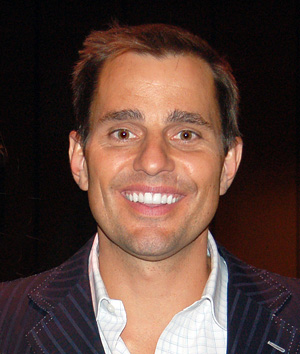
Bill Rancic, winner of season 1

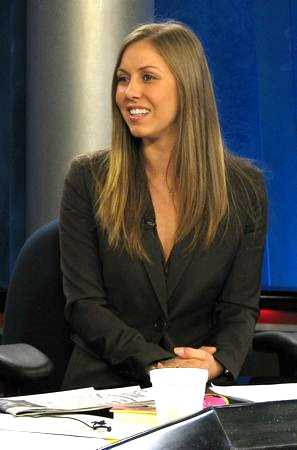
Kendra Todd, winner of season 3

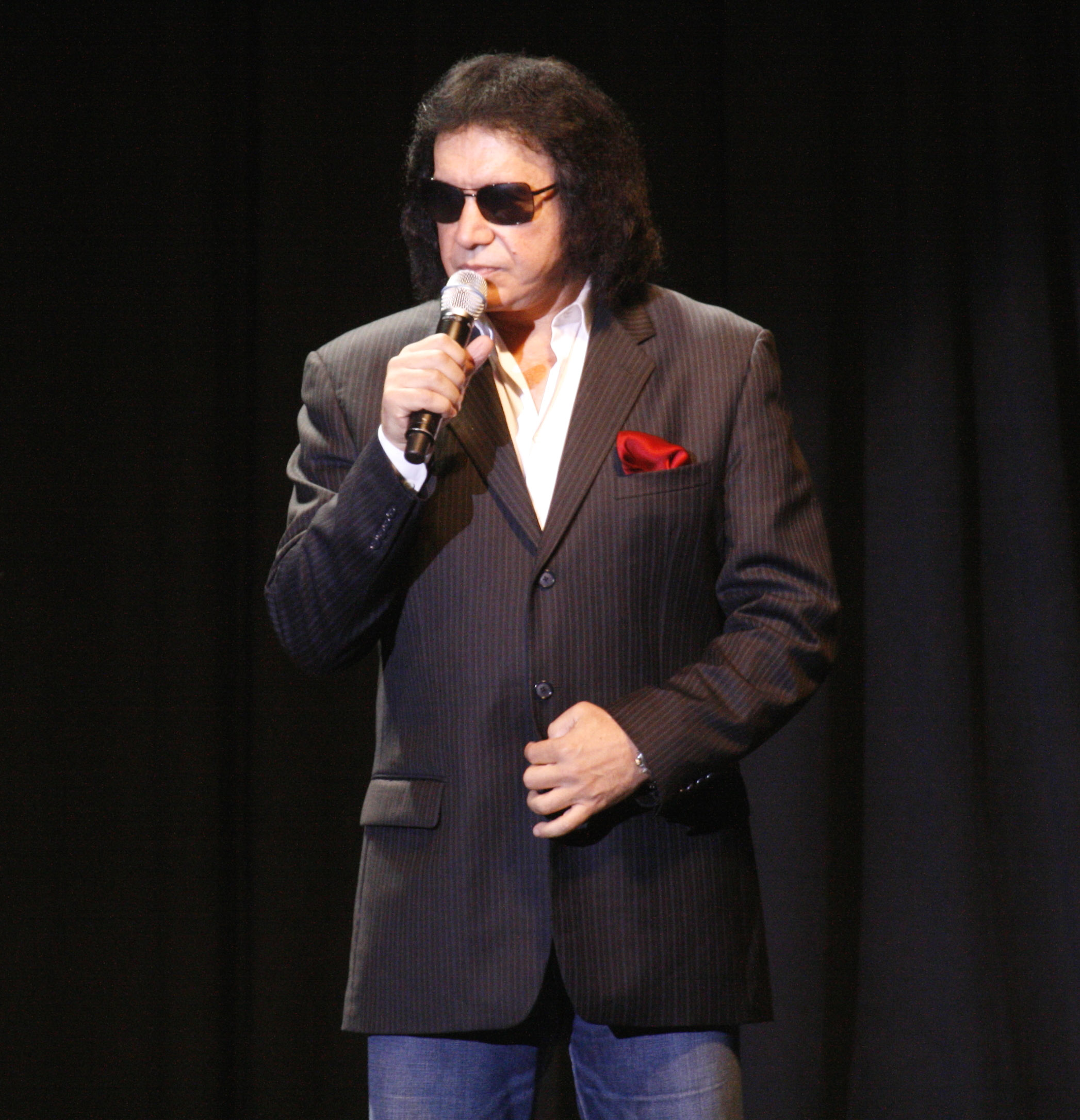
Gene Simmons of season 7

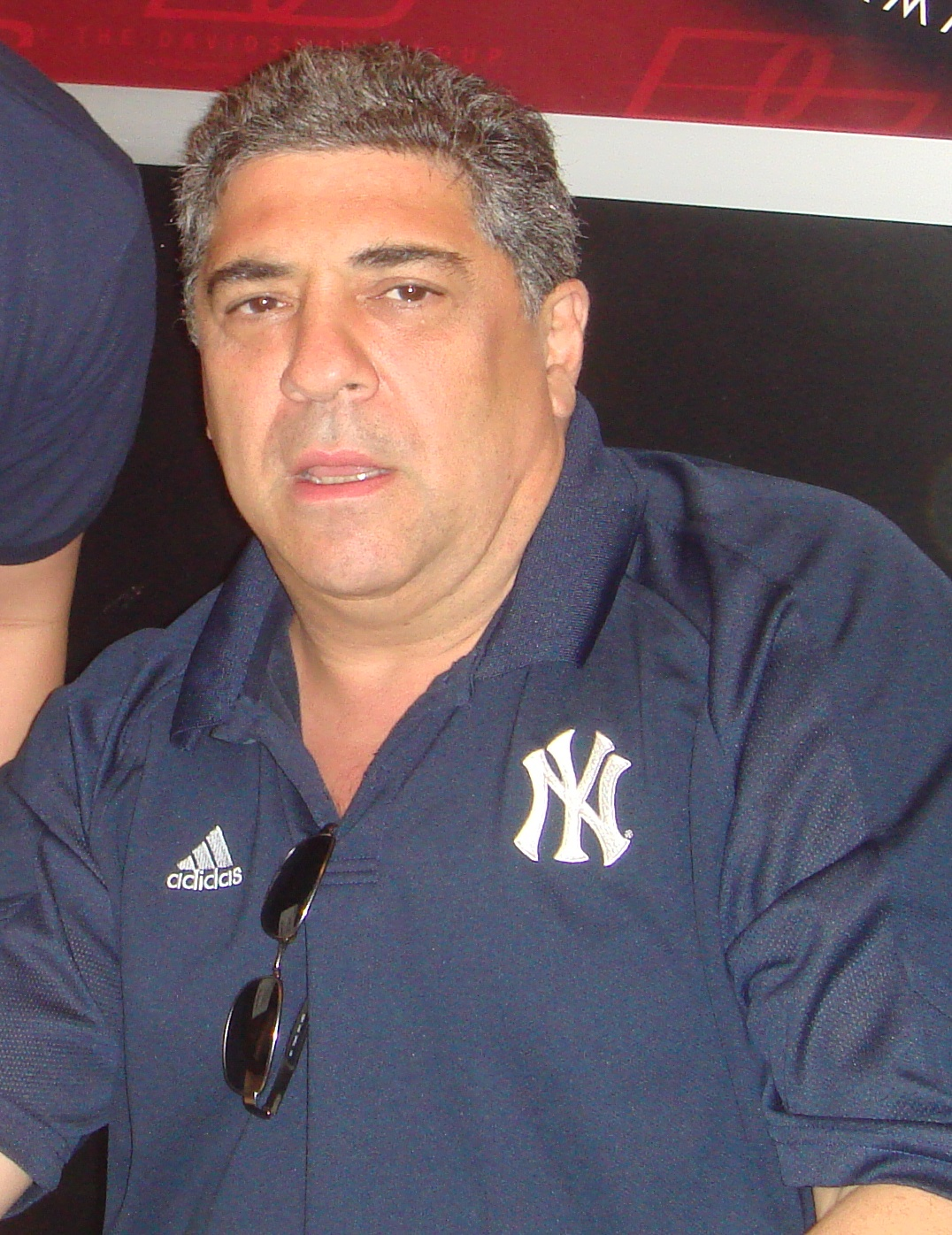
Vincent Pastore of season 7

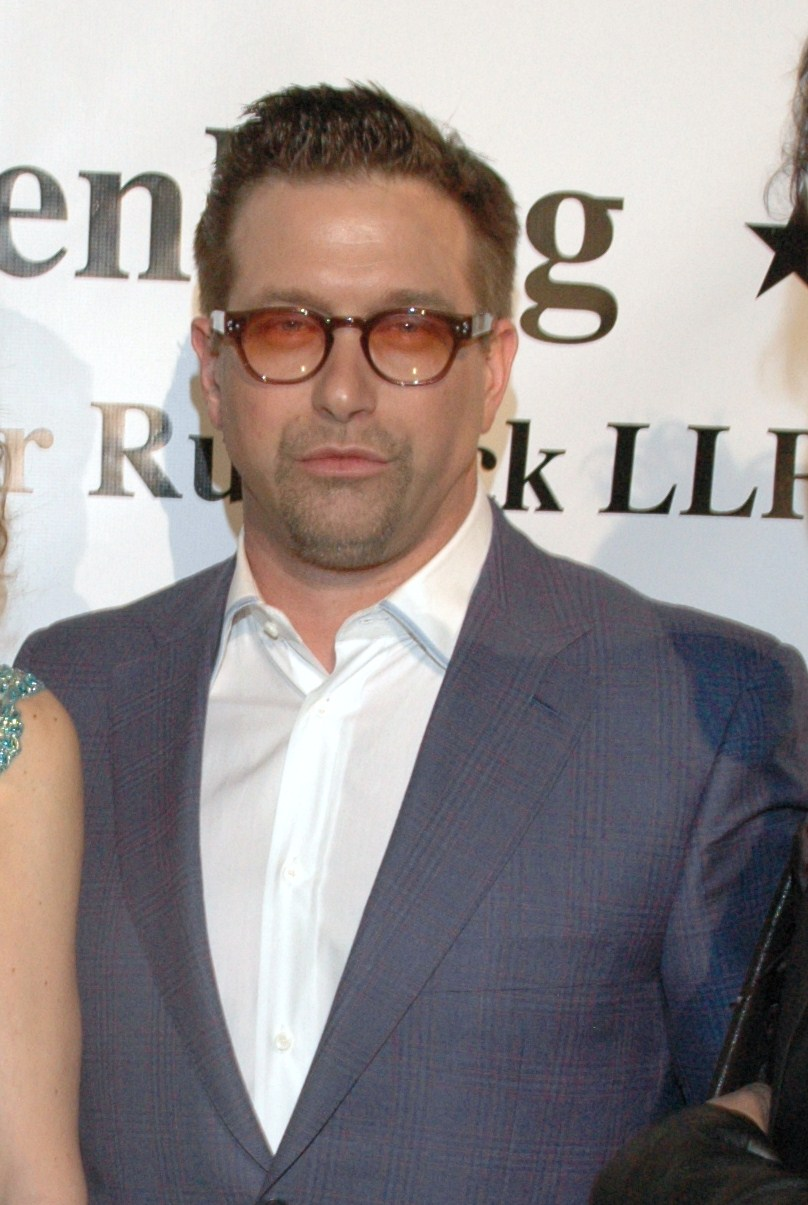
Stephen Baldwin of season 7

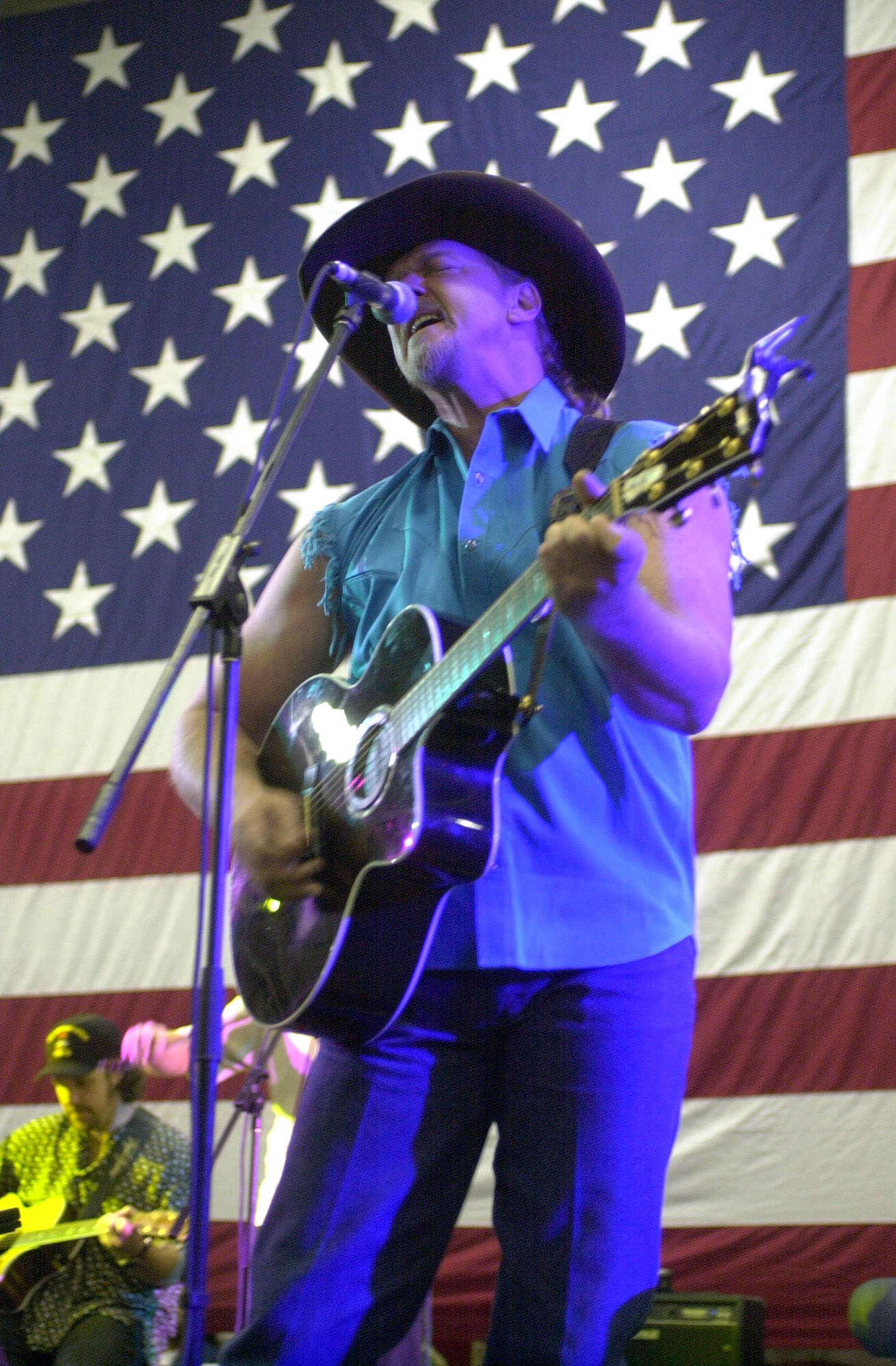
Trace Adkins, runner-up of season 7

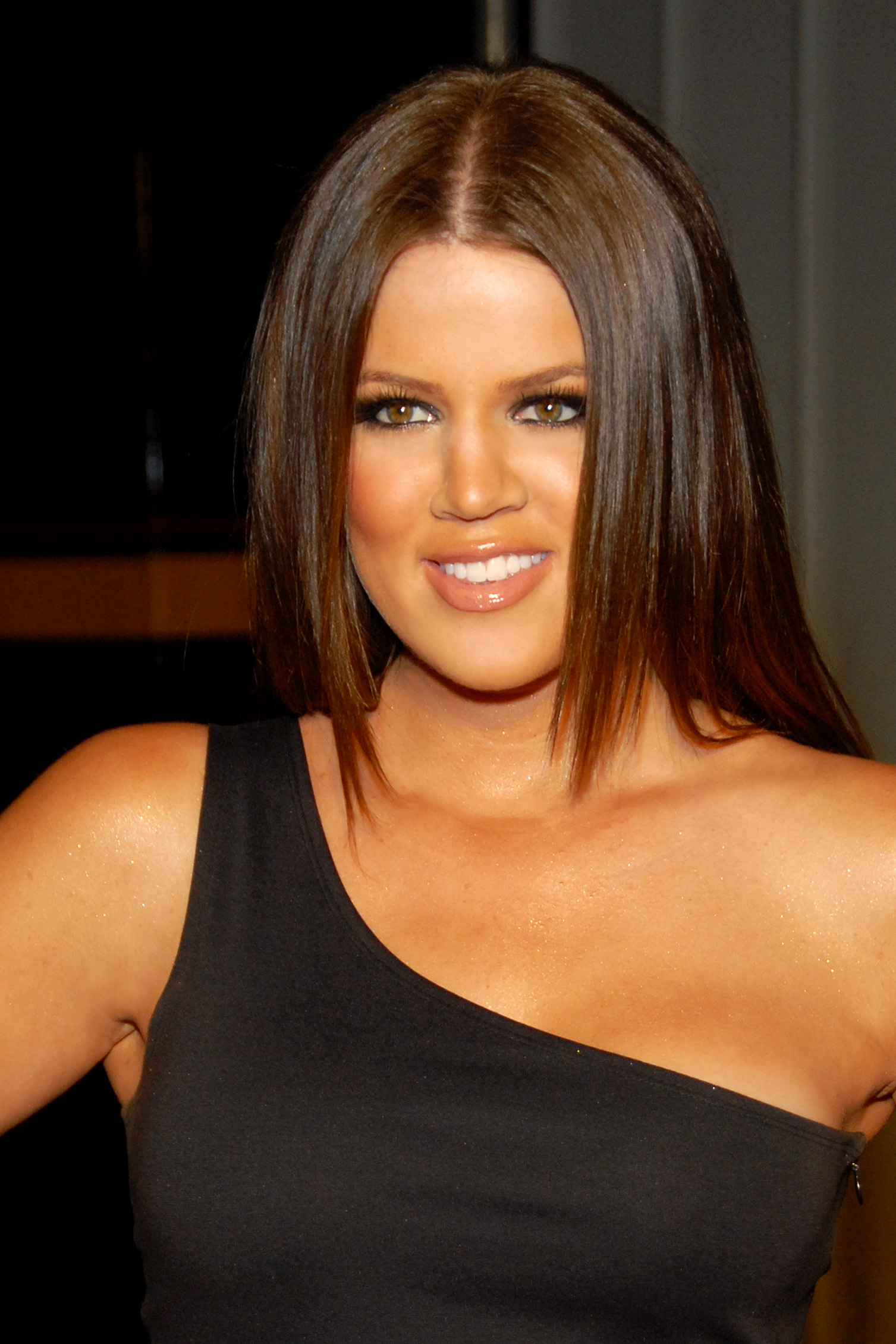
Khloé Kardashian of season 8

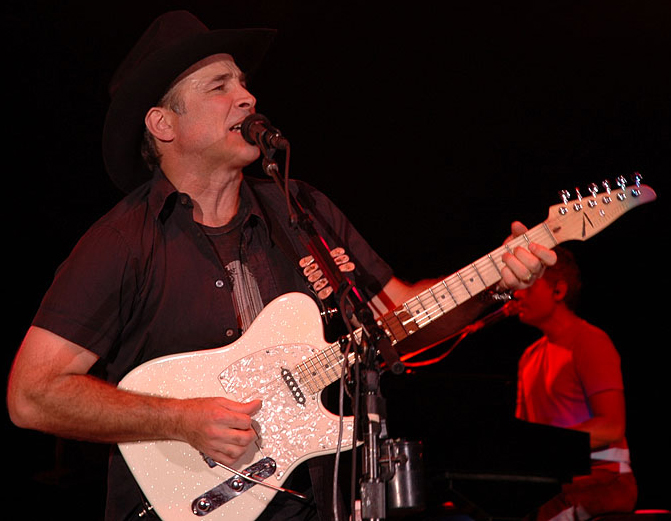
Clint Black of season 8

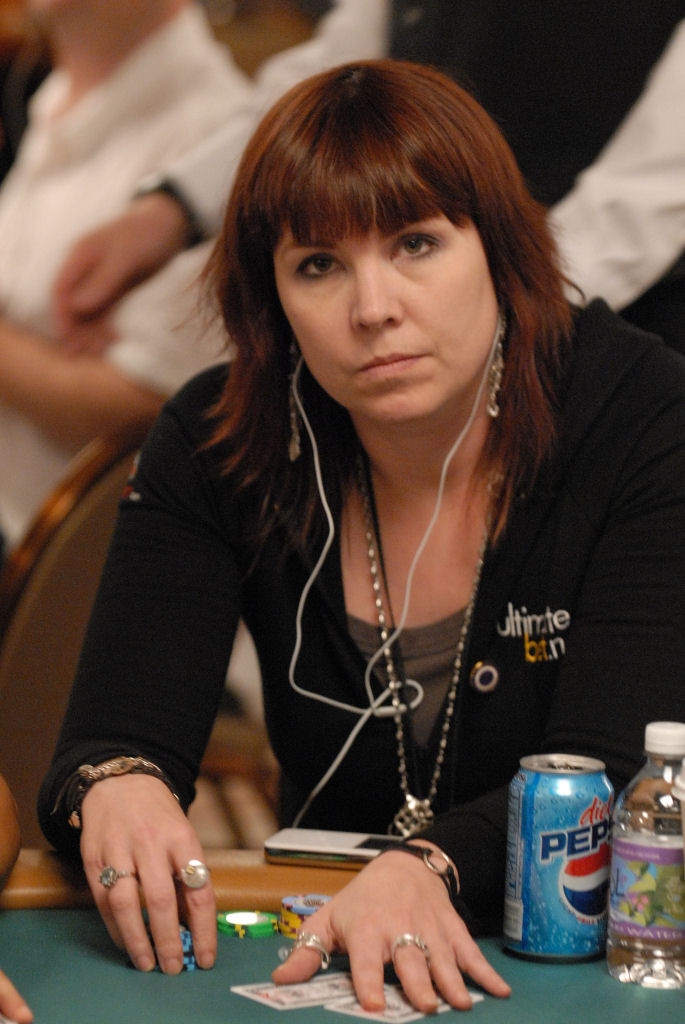
Annie Duke, runner-up of season 8

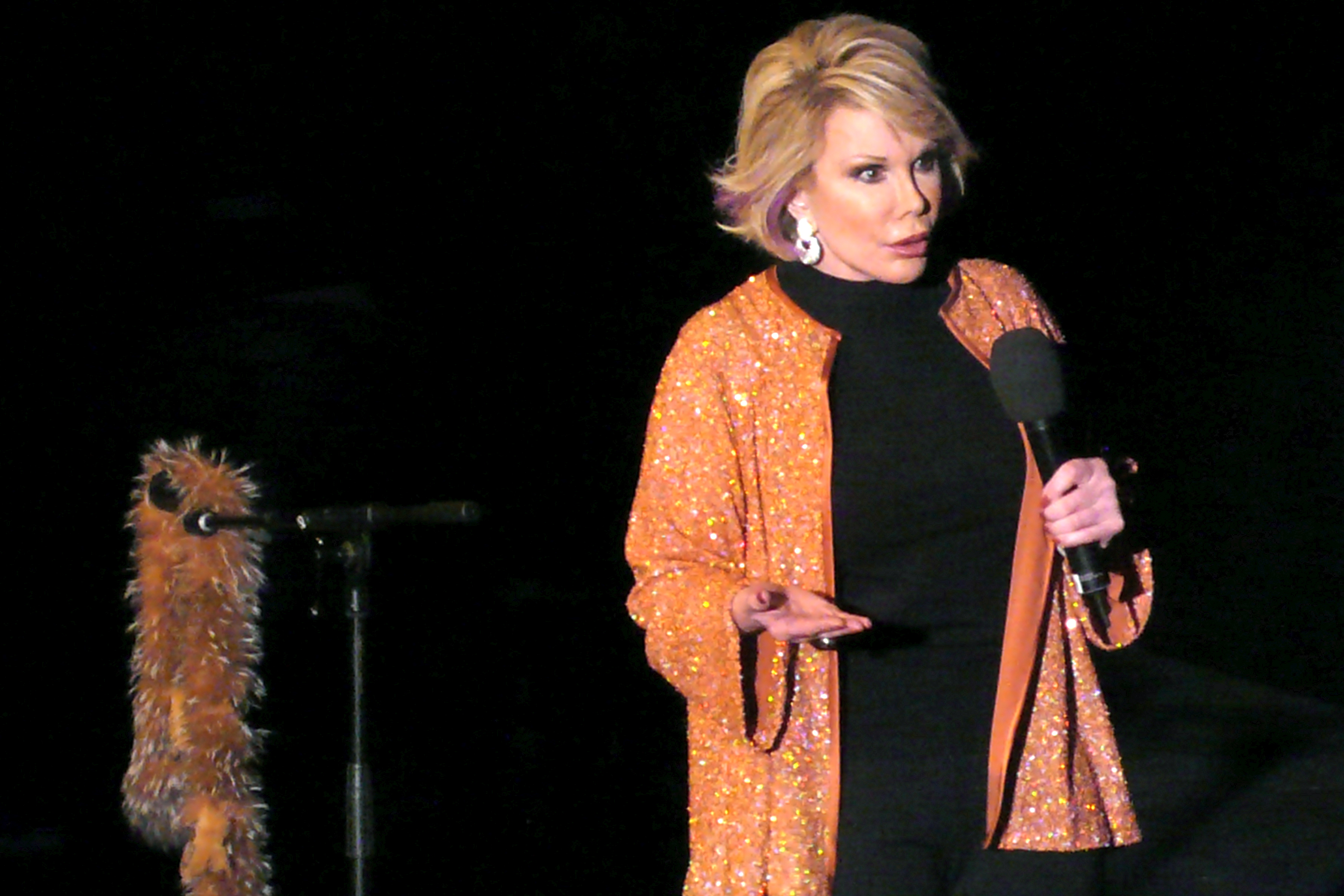
Joan Rivers, winner of season 8

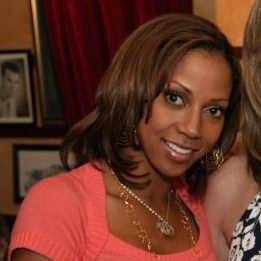
Holly Robinson Peete, runner-up of season 9

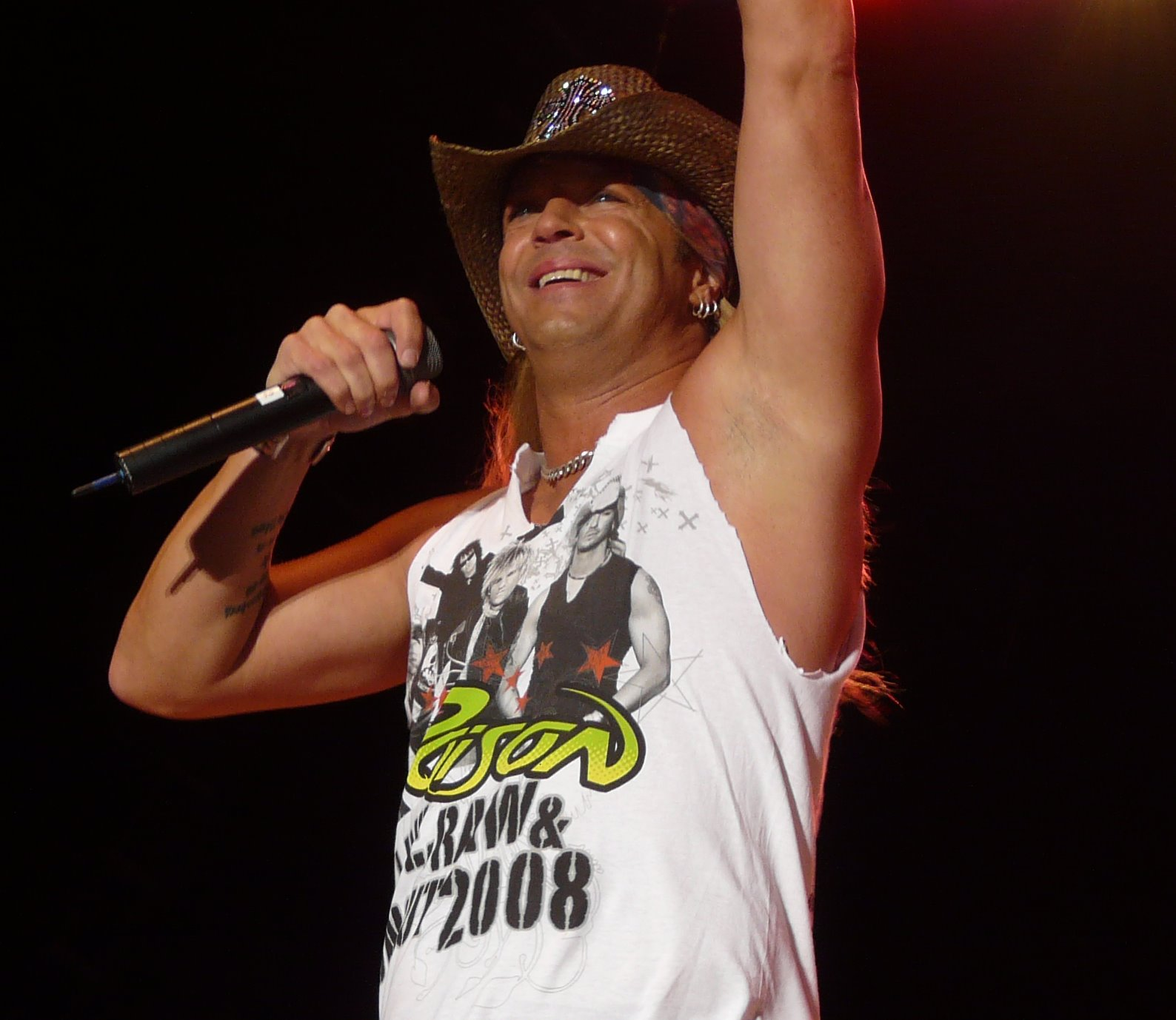
Bret Michaels, winner of season 9

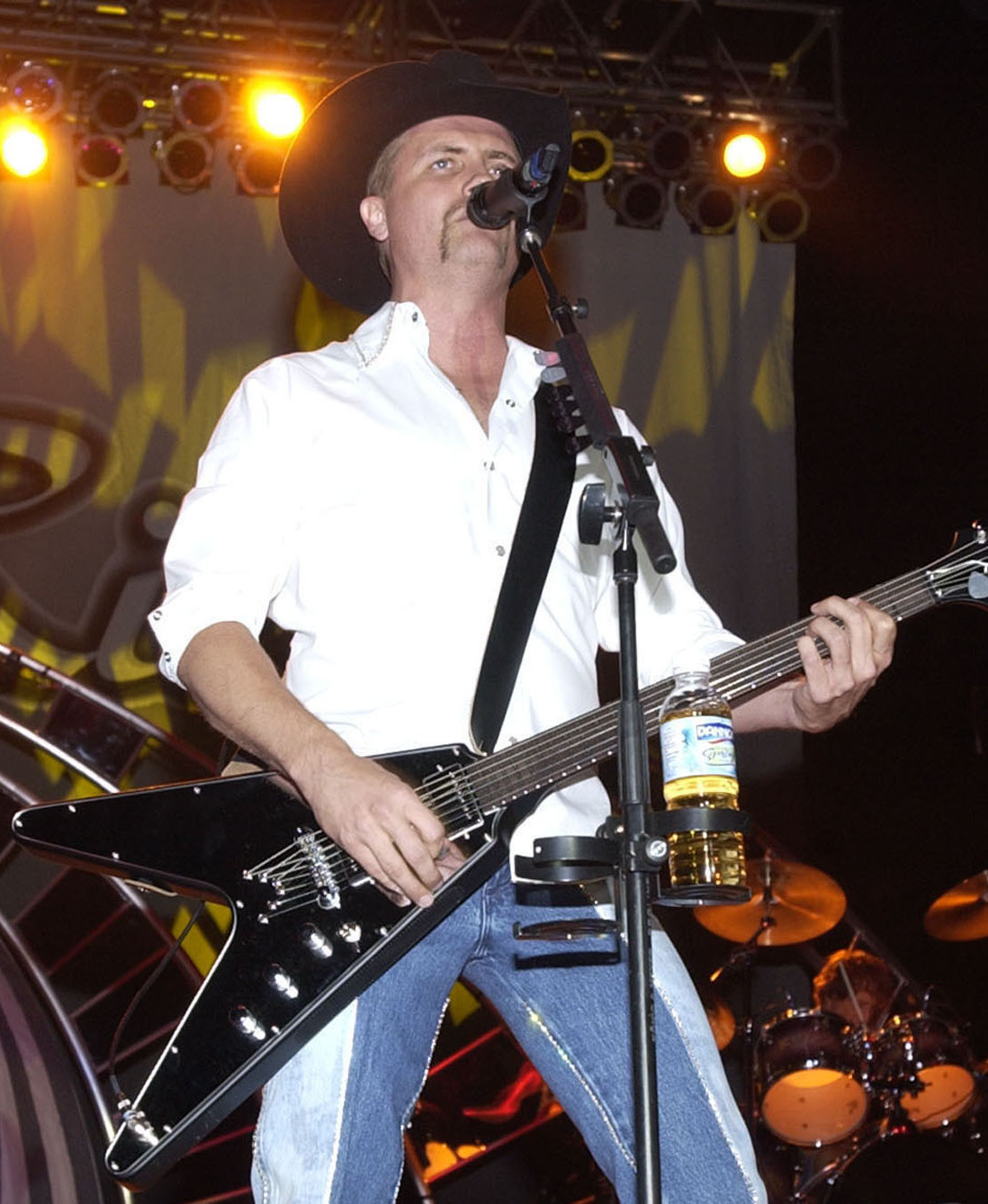
John Rich, winner of season 11

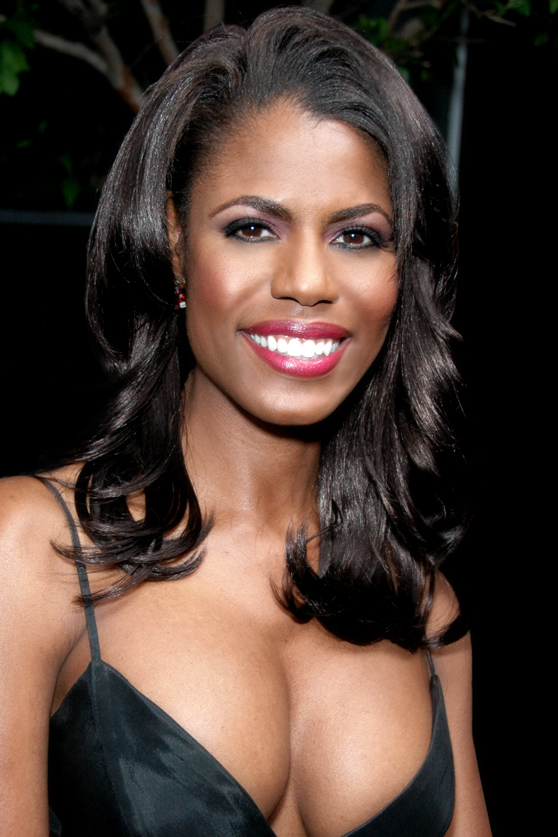
Omarosa has competed on all three different versions of the show.

Contestant participated for a second time.
Contestant participated for a third time.

Season	Name	Team^{[I]}	Age^{[II]}	Hometown	Finish
1	David Gould	Versacorp	31	New York City, New York	16th
1	Jason Curis	Versacorp	23	Detroit, Michigan	15th
1	Sam Solovey	Versacorp	27	Chevy Chase, Maryland	14th
1	Bowie Hogg	Versacorp	25	Dallas, Texas	13th
1	Kristi Frank	Protégé	30	Santa Monica, California	12th
1	Jessie Connors	Protégé	21	New Richmond, Wisconsin	11th
1	Tammy Lee	Protégé	36	Seattle, Washington	10th
1	Ereka Vetrini	Protégé	27	New York City, New York	9th
1	Omarosa Manigault-Stallworth	Protégé	29	Washington, D.C.	8th
1	Heidi Bressler	Protégé	30	Philadelphia, Pennsylvania	7th
1	Katrina Campins	Protégé	24	Coral Gables, Florida	6th
1	Troy McClain	Versacorp	32	Boise, Idaho	5th
1	Nick Warnock	Versacorp	27	Los Angeles, California	4th
1	Amelia "Amy" Henry	Protégé	30	Austin, Texas	3rd
1	Kwame Jackson	Versacorp	29	New York City, New York	2nd
1	Bill Rancic	Versacorp	32	Chicago, Illinois	1st
2	Rob Flanagan	Mosaic	32	Frisco, Texas	18th
2	Bradford Cohen	Apex	33	Fort Lauderdale, Florida	17th
2	Stacie Jones Upchurch	Apex	35	New York City, New York	16th
2	Jennifer Crisafulli	Apex	31	New York City, New York	15th
2	Pamela Day	Mosaic	32	San Francisco, California	14th
2	John Willenborg	Mosaic	24	San Francisco, California	13th
2	Stacy Rotner	Apex	26	New York City, New York	12th
2	Elizabeth Jarosz	Apex	31	Marina del Rey, California	11th
2	Raj Bhakta	Mosaic	28	Philadelphia, Pennsylvania	10th
2	Chris Russo	Mosaic	30	Long Island, New York	9th
2	Maria Boren	Apex	31	Virginia Beach, Virginia	8th
2	Wes Moss	Mosaic	28	Atlanta, Georgia	7th
2	Andy Litinsky	Mosaic	23	Boca Raton, Florida	6th
2	Ivana Ma	Apex	28	Boston, Massachusetts	5th
2	Kevin Allen	Mosaic	29	Chicago, Illinois	4th
2	Sandy Ferreira	Apex	28	Rockville, Maryland	3rd
2	Jennifer Massey	Apex	30	San Francisco, California	2nd
2	Kelly Perdew	Mosaic	37	Carlsbad, California	1st
3	Todd Everett	Magna	34	Carlsbad, California	18th
3	Brian McDowell	Net Worth	29	Wildwood, New Jersey	17th
3	Verna Felton	Magna	31	Seattle, Washington	16th
3	Danny Kastner	Magna	39	Boston, Massachusetts	15th
3	Kristen Kirchner	Net Worth	31	Los Angeles, California	14th
3	Michael Tarshi	Magna	25	Andover, Massachusetts	13th
3	Tara Dowdell	Net Worth	28	New York City, New York	12th
3	Audrey Evans	Net Worth	22	Salt Lake City, Utah	11th
3	John Gafford	Net Worth	32	Tampa, Florida	10th
3	Erin Elmore	Magna	26	Philadelphia, Pennsylvania	9th
3	Stephanie Myers	Magna	29	San Diego, California	8th
3	Angie McKnight	Net Worth	41	Lake Balboa, California	7th
3	Chris Shelton	Net Worth	21	Las Vegas, Nevada	6th
3	Bren Olswanger	Magna	32	Memphis, Tennessee	5th
3	Alex Thomason	Magna	29	Seattle, Washington	4th
3	Craig Williams	Net Worth	37	Conley, Georgia	3rd
3	Tana Goertz	Net Worth	37	West Des Moines, Iowa	2nd
3	Kendra Todd	Magna	26	Boynton Beach, Florida	1st
4	Melissa Holovach	Capital Edge	30	Tampa, Florida	18th
4	Chris Valletta	Excel	27	Dallas, Texas	17th
4	Jennifer Wallen	Capital Edge	31	Anthem, Arizona	16th
4	Toral Mehta	Capital Edge	29	Philadelphia, Pennsylvania	15th
4	Kristi Caudell	Capital Edge	24	Gainesville, Georgia	14th
4	James Dillon	Excel	27	Alexandria, Virginia	10th^{[III]}
4	Mark Lamkin	Excel	35	Louisville, Kentucky	10th^{[III]}
4	Jennifer Murphy	Capital Edge	26	Los Angeles, California	10th^{[III]}
4	Josh Shaw	Excel	30	New York City, New York	10th^{[III]}
4	Markus Garrison	Excel	41	Sarasota, Florida	9th
4	Brian Mandelbaum	Excel	23	New York City, New York	8th
4	Marshawn Evans	Capital Edge	26	Atlanta, Georgia	7th
4	Clay Lee	Excel	28	College Station, Texas	6th
4	Adam Israelov	Excel	22	Atlanta, Georgia	5th
4	Felisha Mason	Capital Edge	29	Kansas City, Missouri	4th
4	Alla Wartenberg	Capital Edge	31	Las Vegas, Nevada	3rd
4	Rebecca Jarvis	Capital Edge	23	Chicago, Illinois	2nd
4	Randal Pinkett	Excel	34	Somerset, New Jersey	1st
5	Summer Zervos	Gold Rush	30	Huntington Beach, California	18th
5	Stacy Schneider	Synergy	38	New York City, New York	17th
5	Jose "Pepi" Diaz	Synergy	25	Miami, Florida	16th
5	Theresa Boutross	Gold Rush	36	Barrington, Illinois	15th
5	Brent Buckman	Synergy	30	Fort Lauderdale, Florida	14th
5	Dan Brody	Gold Rush	31	New Milford, New Jersey	13th
5	Bryce Gahagan	Gold Rush	28	Kansas City, Missouri	12th
5	Lenny Veltman	Gold Rush	37	East Brunswick, New Jersey	11th
5	Leslie Bourgeois	Gold Rush	28	Houma, Louisiana	10th
5	Andrea Lake	Synergy	31	San Diego, California	9th
5	Charmaine Hunt	Gold Rush	27	Nashville, Tennessee	8th
5	Tarek Saab	Gold Rush	27	New Bedford, Massachusetts	7th
5	Michael Laungani	Synergy	29	Chicago, Illinois	6th
5	Tammy Trenta	Synergy	33	Edison, New Jersey	5th
5	Roxanne Wilson	Synergy	26	Austin, Texas	3rd^{[IV]}
5	Allie Jablon	Synergy	30	Columbia, South Carolina	3rd^{[IV]}
5	Lee Bienstock	Gold Rush	22	Brooklyn, New York	2nd
5	Sean Yazbeck	Synergy	33	Miami, Florida	1st
6	Martin Clarke	Arrow	37	Atlanta, Georgia	18th
6	Carey Sherrell	Arrow	25	Atlanta, Georgia	17th
6	Michelle Sorro	Arrow	34	Los Angeles, California	16th
6	Marisa DeMato	Kinetic	28	Wellington, Florida	15th
6	Aaron Altscher	Arrow	25	Fredericksburg, Virginia	14th
6	Aimee Trottier	Kinetic	32	Chicago, Illinois	13th
6	Derek Arteta	Kinetic	34	Los Angeles, California	12th
6	Jenn Hoffman	Kinetic	26	Phoenix, Arizona	11th
6	Surya Yalamanchili	Kinetic	24	Cincinnati, Ohio	10th
6	Muna Heaven	Kinetic	28	Matawan, New Jersey	9th
6	Angela Ruggiero	Kinetic	26	Panorama City, California	8th
6	Tim Urban	Arrow	25	Boston, Massachusetts	7th
6	Heidi Androl	Kinetic	26	Santa Monica, California	6th
6	Kristine Lefebvre	Kinetic	37	Studio City, California	5th
6	Frank Lombardi	Arrow	27	The Bronx, New York	4th
6	Nicole D'Ambrosio	Arrow	25	Chicago, Illinois	3rd
6	James Sun	Arrow	29	Seattle, Washington	2nd
6	Stefanie Schaeffer	Arrow	32	Los Angeles, California	1st
7	Tiffany Fallon	Empresario	33	Fort Lauderdale, Florida	14th
7	Nadia Comăneci	Empresario	46	Oneşti, Romania	13th
7	Gene Simmons	Hydra	58	New York City, New York	12th
7	Jennie Finch	Empresario	27	La Mirada, California	11th
7	Vincent Pastore	Hydra	61	The Bronx, New York	10th
7	Nely Galán	Empresario	44	Santa Clara, Cuba	9th
7	Marilu Henner	Empresario	55	Chicago, Illinois	8th
7	Tito Ortiz	Hydra	32	Huntington Beach, California	7th
7	Omarosa Manigault-Stallworth	Empresario	33	Washington, D.C.	6th
7	Stephen Baldwin	Hydra	41	Massapequa, New York	5th
7	Lennox Lewis	Hydra	42	London, England	4th
7	Carol Alt	Empresario	47	East Williston, New York	3rd
7	Trace Adkins	Hydra	45	Sarepta, Louisiana	2nd
7	Piers Morgan	Hydra	42	Newick, England	1st
8	Andrew "Dice" Clay	KOTU	51	Brooklyn, New York	16th
8	Scott Hamilton	KOTU	50	Nashville, Tennessee	15th
8	Tom Green	KOTU	37	Pembroke, Ontario, Canada	14th
8	Claudia Jordan	Athena	35	Providence, Rhode Island	13th
8	Dennis Rodman	KOTU	48	Trenton, New Jersey	12th
8	Tionne Watkins	Athena	38	Atlanta, Georgia	11th
8	Khloé Kardashian	Athena	24	Los Angeles, California	10th
8	Brian McKnight	KOTU	39	Buffalo, New York	9th
8	Natalie Gulbis	Athena	26	Sacramento, California	8th
8	Herschel Walker	KOTU	47	Wrightsville, Georgia	7th
8	Melissa Rivers	Athena	41	Brooklyn, New York	6th
8	Clint Black	KOTU	47	Long Branch, New Jersey	5th
8	Brande Roderick	Athena	34	Novato, California	4th
8	Jesse James	KOTU	39	Lynwood, California	3rd
8	Annie Duke	Athena	43	Los Angeles, California	2nd
8	Joan Rivers	Athena	75	Brooklyn, New York	1st
9	Carol Leifer	Tenacity	53	Long Island, New York	14th
9	Sinbad	Rocksolid	53	Benton Harbor, Michigan	13th
9	Darryl Strawberry	Rocksolid	47	Los Angeles, California	12th
9	Rod Blagojevich	Rocksolid	53	Chicago, Illinois	11th
9	Michael Johnson	Rocksolid	42	Dallas, Texas	10th
9	Selita Ebanks	Tenacity	26	George Town, Cayman Islands	9th
9	Bill Goldberg	Rocksolid	42	Bonsall, California	8th
9	Summer Sanders	Tenacity	37	Roseville, California	7th
9	Cyndi Lauper	Tenacity	56	Queens, New York	6th
9	Maria Kanellis	Tenacity	27	Chicago, Illinois	5th
9	Curtis Stone	Rocksolid	37	Melbourne, Australia	4th
9	Sharon Osbourne	Tenacity	57	London, England	3rd
9	Holly Robinson Peete	Tenacity	45	Philadelphia, Pennsylvania	2nd
9	Bret Michaels	Rocksolid	47	Butler, Pennsylvania	1st
10	Nicole Chiu	Fortitude	27	Palos Verdes, California	16th
10	Alex Delgado	Octane	43	Santa Ynez, California	15th
10	James Weir	Octane	31	New York City, New York	14th
10	Tyana Alvarado	Fortitude	41	Miami, Florida	13th
10	Gene Folkes	Octane	46	Wylie, Texas	12th
10	Wade Hanson	Octane	33	Woodbury, Minnesota	11th
10	Kelly Smith Beaty	Fortitude	30	Fayetteville, Georgia	10th
10	Mahsa Saeidi-Azcuy	Fortitude	29	Brooklyn, New York	9th
10	David Johnson	Octane	34	Portage, Michigan	8th
10	Anand Vasudev	Octane	31	Tampa, Florida	7th
10	Poppy Carlig	Fortitude	24	Richmond, California	6th
10	Stephanie Castagnier	Fortitude	34	Chicago, Illinois	5th
10	Steuart Martens	Octane	27	Washington, D.C.	4th
10	Liza Mucheru-Wisner	Fortitude	30	Corpus Christi, Texas	3rd
10	Clint Robertson	Octane	40	Fort Worth, Texas	2nd
10	Brandy Kuentzel	Fortitude	30	San Francisco, California	1st
11	David Cassidy	Backbone	60	New York City, New York	16th
11	Lisa Rinna	A.S.A.P.	47	Medford, Oregon	15th
11	Niki Taylor	A.S.A.P.	36	Fort Lauderdale, Florida	14th
11	Dionne Warwick	A.S.A.P.	70	East Orange, New Jersey	13th
11	Jose Canseco	Backbone	46	Havana, Cuba	12th
11	Richard Hatch	Backbone	49	Newport, Rhode Island	11th
11	Mark McGrath	Backbone	42	Hartford, Connecticut	10th
11	Gary Busey	Backbone	66	Goose Creek, Texas	9th
11	Hope Dworaczyk	A.S.A.P.	26	Port Lavaca, Texas	8th
11	NeNe Leakes	A.S.A.P.	43	Athens, Georgia	7th
11	La Toya Jackson	A.S.A.P.	54	Gary, Indiana	6th
11	Star Jones	A.S.A.P.	48	Badin, North Carolina	5th
11	Lil Jon	Backbone	40	Atlanta, Georgia	4th
11	Meat Loaf	Backbone	63	Dallas, Texas	3rd
11	Marlee Matlin	A.S.A.P.	45	Morton Grove, Illinois	2nd
11	John Rich	Backbone	37	Amarillo, Texas	1st
12	Cheryl Tiegs	Forte	64	Breckenridge, Minnesota	18th
12	Victoria Gotti	Forte	48	Brooklyn, New York	17th
12	George Takei	Unanimous	74	Los Angeles, California	16th
12	Adam Carolla	Unanimous	47	Los Angeles, California	15th
12	Michael Andretti	Unanimous	49	Bethlehem, Pennsylvania	14th
12	Tia Carrere	Forte	44	Honolulu, Hawaii	13th
12	Patricia Velásquez	Forte	40	Zulia, Venezuela	12th
12	Debbie Gibson	Forte	41	Brooklyn, New York	11th
12	Dee Snider	Unanimous	56	Astoria, New York	10th
12	Lou Ferrigno	Unanimous	59	Brooklyn, New York	9th
12	Paul Teutul Sr.	Unanimous	62	Yonkers, New York	8th
12	Penn Jillette	Unanimous	56	Las Vegas, Nevada	7th
12	Dayana Mendoza	Forte	25	Caracas, Venezuela	6th
12	Teresa Giudice	Forte	39	Paterson, New Jersey	5th
12	Lisa Lampanelli	Forte	50	Trumbull, Connecticut	4th
12	Aubrey O'Day	Forte	27	San Francisco, California	3rd
12	Clay Aiken	Unanimous	32	Raleigh, North Carolina	2nd
12	Arsenio Hall	Unanimous	55	Cleveland, Ohio	1st
13	Bret Michaels	Power	49	Butler, Pennsylvania	14th
13	Dee Snider	Plan B	57	Astoria, New York	13th
13	La Toya Jackson	Power	56	Gary, Indiana	12th
13	Claudia Jordan	Power	39	Providence, Rhode Island	11th
13	Omarosa Manigault-Stallworth	Power	39	Youngstown, Ohio	10th
13	Dennis Rodman	Power	51	Trenton, New Jersey	9th
13	Stephen Baldwin	Plan B	46	Massapequa, New York	8th
13	Brande Roderick	Power	38	Novato, California	7th
13	Gary Busey	Plan B	68	Goose Creek, Texas	6th
13	Marilu Henner	Plan B	60	Chicago, Illinois	5th
13	Lisa Rinna	Plan B	49	Medford, Oregon	4th
13	Lil Jon	Power	42	Atlanta, Georgia	3rd
13	Penn Jillette	Plan B	58	Greenfield, Massachusetts	2nd
13	Trace Adkins	Plan B	52	Sarepta, Louisiana	1st
14	Keshia Knight Pulliam	Infinity	35	Newark, New Jersey	16th
14	Kevin Jonas	Vortex	27	Wyckoff, New Jersey	15th
14	Gilbert Gottfried	Vortex	59	Brooklyn, New York	14th
14	Jamie Anderson	Infinity	24	South Lake Tahoe, California	13th
14	Terrell Owens	Vortex	41	Alexander City, Alabama	12th
14	Shawn Johnson	Infinity	23	West Des Moines, Iowa	11th
14	Lorenzo Lamas	Vortex	56	Santa Monica, California	10th
14	Sig Hansen	Vortex	56	Seattle, Washington	9th
14	Kate Gosselin	Infinity	39	Philadelphia, Pennsylvania	8th
14	Kenya Moore	Infinity	43	Detroit, Michigan	7th
14	Ian Ziering	Vortex	50	Newark, New Jersey	6th
14	Johnny Damon	Vortex	41	Fort Riley, Kansas	5th
14	Brandi Glanville	Infinity	41	Salinas, California	4th
14	Vivica A. Fox	Infinity	50	South Bend, Indiana	3rd
14	Geraldo Rivera	Vortex	71	Brooklyn, New York	2nd
14	Leeza Gibbons	Infinity	57	Hartsville, South Carolina	1st
15	Carrie Keagan	Prima	36	Amherst, New York	16th
15	Carnie Wilson	Prima	48	Bel Air, California	15th
15	Eric Dickerson	Arete	56	Hartford, Connecticut	14th
15	Nicole "Snooki" Polizzi	Prima	28	Jersey City, New Jersey	13th
15	Kyle Richards	Prima	47	Beverly Hills, California	12th
15	Jon Lovitz	Arete	59	Tarzana, California	11th
15	Vince Neil	Arete	55	Hollywood, California	10th
15	Chael Sonnen	Arete	39	West Linn, Oregon	9th
15	Porsha Williams	Prima	35	Decatur, Georgia	8th
15	Ricky Williams	Arete	39	San Diego, California	7th
15	Lisa Leslie	Prima	44	Glendora, California	6th
15	Carson Kressley	Arete	46	Orefield, Pennsylvania	5th
15	Laila Ali	Prima	38	Miami Beach, Florida	4th
15	Brooke Burke-Charvet	Prima	45	Tucson, Arizona	3rd
15	Boy George	Arete	55	London, England	2nd
15	Matt Iseman	Arete	45	Denver, Colorado	1st

^{^[I]} Candidate's team at the start of the season.
^{^[II]} Candidate's age at the start of the season.
^{^[III]} Four season-4 candidates were fired simultaneously and therefore display the same result.
^{^[IV]} Two season-5 candidates were fired simultaneously and therefore display the same result.
