= James Sun =

American businessman

- Born: Seoul, South Korea
- Education: University of Washington, Seattle
- Occupations: Founder, CEO of Pirq.com

Korean name
- Hangul: 선우신
- RR: Seon Usin
- MR: Sŏn Usin

James Sun (Korean: 선우신;) is an entrepreneur, television host, and public speaker. He is the owner of Dramabeans.com and Beautytap.com, as well as the owner and co-founder of Devblock.net, a software agency focused on artificial intelligence and digital transformation.

He was the founder and former CEO of Pirq.com, an integrated payment and loyalty application for small and medium-sized businesses. The platform was acquired by iPayment, one of the largest payment processing companies in the United States, and was deployed to over 10,000 merchants through a successful integration with iPayment. Sun later served as Senior Vice President of Strategy and Products at iPayment for two and a half years, where he oversaw the launch of new payment integrations, technologies, and products distributed to approximately 120,000 small business merchant accounts. Earlier in his career, he worked at Intel Corporation as a database programmer and at Deloitte Consulting as a management consultant for several Fortune 500 clients, including Honeywell, Microsoft, DaimlerChrysler, and Boeing.

Sun's family immigrated to the United States when he was three years old. His interest in business and entrepreneurship began at an early age; at 11, he started a window-cleaning marketing service, and by 13, he was reading The Wall Street Journal and studying finance. After graduating from high school, he founded an investment company, Sun & Associates, with US$5,000 at age 18 and became a multimillionaire by age 22. He graduated cum laude from the University of Washington with a bachelor's degree in Business Administration and Computer Information Systems.

Sun was also part of the publishing industry as one of the owners of KoreAm, an award-winning monthly magazine covering news, commentary, politics, lifestyle, and culture in the Asian American community. It was the oldest and most widely circulated English-language monthly magazine for Asian Americans. He was also the owner of Audrey Magazine, a national publication focusing on the Asian American women's experience, covering popular culture, fashion, beauty, lifestyle, travel, and social issues.

Sun has extensive media and marketing experience. He hosted the BBC television program Sun Tzu: War on Business. He also appeared on Season 6 of Donald Trump's reality television series The Apprentice.

Sun is a frequent speaker on consumer segmentation and diversity, particularly in the areas of globalization, immigration, and generational differences among Generation Y, Generation X, and Baby Boomers. He contributed to the book Millennial Leaders Y as an expert in this field and has written guest blogs for CEO Magazine and Fortune Magazine on leadership and entrepreneurship.

Sun was named among the top 100 alumni of the University of Washington in its "Wondrous 100 Alumni Award" initiative, alongside individuals such as Bill Gates Sr., Governor Christine Gregoire, and musician Kenny G. In 2011, he served as Master of Ceremonies for the Seattle Symphony's "Celebrate Asia" event held on January 14, 2011.

== The Apprentice ==
Sun was one of four finalists in the finale of season 6 of The Apprentice, Donald Trump's business reality show. He and Stefanie Schaeffer survived the first elimination, but Trump ultimately selected Schaeffer as his next apprentice.

Following his elimination, Sun wrote on his blog that he was "dumbfounded" and uncertain about what Trump meant by the "things" referenced during the boardroom discussion. He speculated that the comment might have referred to his decision to promote his Internet company during the competition.
