= The Apprentice (American TV series) season 6 =

The Apprentice
- Season 6
- No. of contestants: 18
- Winner: Stefanie Schaeffer
- Runner-up: James Sun
- No. of episodes: 14

Release
- Original network: NBC
- Original release: January 7 – April 22, 2007

Additional information
- Filming dates: June 2006 – July 2006

Season chronology
- ← Previous; Season 5 Next → Season 7

The Apprentice: Los Angeles is the sixth installment of the American version of The Apprentice reality television show. It was confirmed on November 30, 2005. Like the other Apprentice seasons, Donald Trump is the executive producer and host in his quest to hire a sixth apprentice. In a departure from the previous five Apprentice seasons, this one was shot in Los Angeles, California. As with seasons two through five, this season featured 18 contestants (whom Trump calls "candidates"). Ivanka Trump made her debut as a full-time boardroom judge this season (replacing Carolyn Kepcher, who was recently fired). Donald Trump Jr. also made his debut as a full-time judge this season (replacing George H. Ross, who did not appear due to the show's LA filming schedule, but did make a cameo appearance in the finale).

== Season 6 changes ==
In addition to the change of locale, the following changes (including some "Apprentice firsts") have been made in the show's structure for the sixth season as described herein:

- Candidates must earn the right to live in the provided Beverly Hills mansion by simply winning the weekly task. Otherwise, the candidates will live in "Tent City", a location across the hedge from the mansion's swimming pool.
  - Tent City will not have any access to electricity for common living tasks and will sleep in tents, outdoors.
  - Tent City does have access to two tents, private (cold) showers, fresh water, alcoholic drinks, and food (and a grill on which to cook it).
  - Tent City also appears to have access to an indoor "business center" adjunct to the mansion, with computers and Internet service, though the use of this room has only been shown during one task (Week 3).
  - Candidates appear to be able to communicate to each other over the hedge separating Tent City from the mansion's pool, based on footage from week five.
  - This season at the request of Trump is a battle between the "haves" (in the mansion) and the "have nots" (in Tent City).
- The candidates will be living next door to Trump's Los Angeles office mansion for this season.
  - The scenery and the elevation allows Trump to watch the teams in the top floor of his office mansion (both Tent City and the pool area) and observe the teams.
  - Trump, at his discretion, may also visit the teams while they are at the mansion to see some of the dynamics on the teams directly.
- The project manager from the winning team will continue to be the project manager for that team until the team loses.
- The project manager from the winning team will be allowed to attend and participate in the boardroom firings for the losing team.
- The final task was not between the final two candidates like in the previous five seasons. The final task involved the final four candidates instead. Stefani and James competed against Nicole and Frank, and neither team was fired during the episode. All four were invited back for the live season finale, where Frank and Nicole were ultimately fired first because they lost the final task. This was also different as four candidates had a chance to win on the final day, opposed to just two the first five seasons and all subsequent seasons.
- This season is the only season to feature eight men and ten women competing instead of the usual nine men and nine women.

== Candidates ==
The following is the list of candidates for this season, with their original team placements after teams were selected in week one. Some contestants did not have to audition but were recruited by the casting members.

Team 1	Team 2
Kinetic	Arrow

Candidate	Background	Original team	Age	Hometown	Result
Stefani Schaeffer	Defense attorney	Arrow	32	Los Angeles, California	Hired by Trump (4-22-2007)
James Sun	Internet company owner	Arrow	29	Seattle, Washington	Fired at end of the season finale (4-22-2007)
Nicole D'Ambrosio	Real estate broker	Arrow	25	Chicago, Illinois	Fired in middle of the season finale (4-22-2007)
Frank Lombardi	Real estate developer	Arrow	27	Bronx, New York	Fired in middle of the season finale (4-22-2007)
Kristine Lefebvre	Licensing attorney	Kinetic	37	Los Angeles, California	Fired in week 12 (4-8-2007)
Heidi Androl	Sales manager	Kinetic	26	Santa Monica, California	Fired in week 12 (4-8-2007)
Tim Urban	Tutoring company owner	Arrow	24	Los Angeles, California	Fired in week 11 (4-1-2007)
Angela Ruggiero	Olympic athlete	Kinetic	26	Oyster Bay, New York	Fired in week 10 (3-25-2007)
Muna Heaven	Family law litigator	Kinetic	28	Matawan, New Jersey	Fired in week 9 (3-18-2007)
Surya Yalamanchili	Brand manager	Kinetic	24	Cincinnati, Ohio	Fired in week 8 (3-11-2007)
Jennifer Hoffman	Publicist, Writer, Performance Artist	Kinetic	26	Phoenix, Arizona and Huntington, NY	Fired in week 7 (3-4-2007)
Derek Arteta	Entertainment lawyer	Kinetic	34	Los Angeles, California	Fired in week 7 (3-4-2007)
Aimee Trottier	Surgical sales rep.	Kinetic	32	Miami, Florida	Fired in week 6 (2-18-2007)
Aaron Altscher	Real estate sales manager	Arrow	25	Chicago, Illinois	Fired in week 5 (2-11-2007)
Marisa DeMato	Class action attorney	Kinetic	28	Wellington, Florida	Fired in week 4 (1-28-2007)
Michelle Sorro	Real estate consultant	Arrow	34	Los Angeles, California	Quit in week 3 (1-21-2007)
Carey Sherrell	Marketing firm owner	Arrow	25	Atlanta, Georgia	Fired in week 2 (1-14-2007)
Martin Clarke	Attorney/Professor	Arrow	37	Atlanta, Georgia	Fired in week 1 (1-7-2007)

=== Olympic candidates ===
During the 2006 Winter Olympics in Turin, Donald Trump announced that 12 Olympians (eight men and four women) from Team United States 2006 would be vying for a spot on this edition. Voting continued throughout the entire Olympics, concluding on the closing ceremonies. Although not all of them made it to the "interview process", the 12 Olympians are as follows:

Athlete	Sport	Notes
Allison Baver	Speed skating	
Travis Cabral	Freestyle skating	
Casey FitzRandolph	Speed skating	
Todd Hays	Bobsled	
Chad Hedrick	Speed skating	
Danny Kass	Snowboarding	
Joe Pack	Freestyle skiing	
Jeret Peterson	Freestyle skiing	
Angela Ruggiero	Ice hockey	Chosen as a candidate on May 30, 2006
Katie Uhlaender	Skeleton	
Seth Wescott	Snowboarding	
Chris Witty	Speed Skating	

== Team picks ==
- Using feedback from the candidates, Donald Trump picked the first project managers for the first task.
- Heidi and Frank were selected and picked their respective teams using alternate selections, one at a time.

	Kinetic	Arrow
PM	Heidi	Frank
1	Derek	Carey
2	Aimee	Tim
3	Marisa	Aaron
4	Angela	Nicole
5	Surya	James
6	Kristine	Stefani
7	Muna	Michelle
8	Jenn	Martin

== Weekly results ==
Candidate	Original team	Week 3 team^{1}	Week 4 team	Week 10 team	Week 12 partner	Final task team^{2}	Application result	Record as project manager
Stefani Schaeffer	Arrow	Team Aaron	Arrow	Arrow	James Sun	Arrow	Hired by Trump	
James Sun	Arrow	Team Aaron	Arrow	Arrow	Stefani Schaeffer	Arrow	Fired in the season finale ^{3}	2–1 (win in weeks 9 & 10, loss in week 11)
Nicole D'Ambrosio	Arrow	Team Michelle	Arrow	Kinetic	Kristine Lefebvre	Kinetic	Fired in the season finale ^{3}	0–1 (loss in week 2)
Frank Lombardi	Arrow	Team Michelle	Arrow	Arrow	Heidi Androl	Kinetic	Fired in the season finale ^{3}	0–1 (loss in week 1)
Kristine Lefebvre	Kinetic		Kinetic	Kinetic	Nicole D'Ambrosio		Fired in week 12	1–1 (win in week 8, loss in week 9)
Heidi Androl	Kinetic		Kinetic	Kinetic	Frank Lombardi		Fired in week 12	3–1 (win in weeks 1, 2 & 11, loss in week 4)
Tim Urban	Arrow	Team Michelle	Arrow	Arrow			Fired in week 11	
Angela Ruggiero	Kinetic		Kinetic	Kinetic			Fired in week 10	0–1 (loss in week 10)
Muna Heaven	Kinetic		Kinetic				Fired in week 9	
Surya Yalamanchili	Kinetic		Arrow				Fired in week 8	2–1 (win in weeks 6 & 7, loss in week 8)
Jenn Hoffman	Kinetic		Kinetic				Fired in week 7	0–1 (loss in week 7)
Derek Arteta	Kinetic		Kinetic				Fired in week 7	
Aimee Trottier	Kinetic		Kinetic				Fired in week 6	1-1 (win in week 5, loss in week 6)
Aaron Altscher	Arrow	Team Aaron	Arrow				Fired in week 5	2–1 (win in weeks 3 & 4, loss in week 5)
Marisa DeMato	Kinetic		Kinetic				Fired in week 4	
Michelle Sorro	Arrow	Team Michelle					Quit in week 3	0–1 (loss in week 3)
Carey Sherrell	Arrow						Fired in week 2	
Martin Clarke	Arrow						Fired in week 1	

^Note 1: Kinetic was exempt from week 3 as a result of their win in week 2. Arrow was split in two factions (Team Aaron and Team Michelle) during week 3.
^Note 2: As there were no more project managers or team names for the final task, each team was identified simply as "James & Stefani" or "Frank & Nicole." However, an Arrow sign could be seen in the background of James' and Stefani's editing room, while a Kinetic sign could be seen in the background of Frank's and Nicole's editing room. For the final task, the final four candidates were directed to split into two teams, and each team was asked to choose two previously fired candidates to assist them. James and Stefani chose Angela and Aaron, while Frank and Nicole chose Tim and Surya.
^Note 3: Trump fired three people during the course of the live finale. Frank and Nicole were fired in the middle of the finale, while James was fired at the end of the finale.

Elimination chart
No.	Candidate	1	2	3	4	5	6	7	8	9	10	11	12	13
1	Stefani	IN	IN	IN	IN	IN	IN	IN	IN	IN	IN	IN	IN	HIRED
2	James	IN	IN	IN	IN	IN	IN	IN	BR	WIN	WIN	LOSE	IN	FIRED
3	Nicole	IN	LOSE	IN	IN	BR	IN	IN	IN	IN	IN	IN	IN	FIRED
4	Frank	LOSE	IN	IN	IN	IN	IN	IN	IN	IN	IN	IN	IN	FIRED
5	Kristine	IN	IN	IN	IN	IN	IN	IN	WIN	LOSE	IN	IN	FIRED	
6	Heidi	WIN	WIN	IN	LOSE	IN	IN	IN	IN	IN	IN	WIN	FIRED	
7	Tim	BR	IN	IN	IN	IN	IN	IN	BR	IN	IN	FIRED		
8	Angela	IN	IN	IN	IN	IN	IN	IN	IN	IN	FIRED			
9	Muna	IN	IN	IN	IN	IN	IN	IN	IN	FIRED				
10	Surya	IN	IN	IN	IN	BR	WIN	WIN	FIRED					
11	Jenn	IN	IN	IN	IN	IN	BR	FIRED						
12	Derek	IN	IN	IN	IN	IN	BR	FIRED						
13	Aimee	IN	IN	IN	BR	WIN	FIRED							
14	Aaron	IN	IN	WIN	WIN	FIRED								
15	Marisa	IN	IN	IN	FIRED									
16	Michelle	IN	BR	QUIT										
17	Carey	IN	FIRED											
18	Martin	FIRED												

The candidate was on the losing team.
The candidate was hired and won the competition.
The candidate won as project manager on his/her team.
The candidate lost as project manager on his/her team.
The candidate was called to the final boardroom.
The candidate was fired.
The candidate lost as project manager and was fired.
The candidate lost as project manager and quit the competition.
The candidate didn't participate in the week 3 challenge.

== Episodes ==
=== Episode 1 – To Have and Have Not ===
- Airdate: January 7, 2007
- Prologue: The applicants were required to construct a tent as so they could determine how they worked along; this also served to determine which two candidates were to be the first project managers (Heidi and Frank). During this period, Frank was so loud that Trump heard him from his own mansion and told him to keep it down, while Martin irked the others by standing on a rock and not doing any of the work. Heidi and Frank subsequently picked their respective team members using alternate selections, one at a time.
- Task scope: Each team was assigned a car wash to run for a day. The teams could use any method to try earning the most sales.
- Judges: Donald Trump; Ivanka Trump
- Kinetic project manager: Heidi
- Arrow project manager: Frank
- Winning team: Kinetic
  - Reasons for win: The team immediately got to work, using signs on cardboard boxes and arranging for a free lunch (hot dog and soda) with every car wash. They also took advantage of the demographics of West Hollywood, hiring shirtless guys to hold the signs and to attract customers.
  - Reward: Dinner at Spago with Wolfgang Puck, Donald, Melania, and Ivanka.
- Losing team: Arrow
  - Reasons for loss: Frank ran off early with Tim to attempt to make signs, and then Aaron to carry out promotions, leaving the rest of the team short on manpower. The price point of $10 for a basic wash, set by Frank after a brief discussion at the start of the task, may have been too low, as the team only lost by less than $120. Martin was shown to not contribute as much as other members of the team.
  - Sent to boardroom: Frank, Martin, and Tim
  - Firing verdict:
    - Tim was told to go back to the losers' tent after Frank quickly conceded that he was not responsible for the loss.
    - Most of the team felt that Frank did not make some smart decisions but agreed he had the drive and the passion for the show.
    - Martin was found to be the weakest contributor by most of his team. When Heidi and Ivanka (as well as PM Frank) were asked as to who should be fired, both of them agreed to eliminate Martin.
      - Ivanka was a heavy contributor to his decision to fire Martin, pointing out his inability to work well with others and her not seeing him ever being able to fit into a business like structure that the job would require in addition to a couple of unprofessional flaws Ivanka spotted during the first 5–15 minutes of the show (stating that he had to use the bathroom during his introduction). Trump agreed and proceeded to Fire Martin due to this.
- Fired: Martin Clarke – for not having a stronger fight or passion, having an unprofessional attitude towards Trump and his teammates, not working well with others, and for less contributions on this task. Trump determined that both Frank and Martin performed poorly and contributed to the loss with their fatal mistakes, but Trump stated that Martin would fit better within the fields of a professor or lawyer as opposed to a business executive for the Trump organization.
- Notes
  - The season premiere aired for 90 minutes.
  - Although the teams at the time the episode aired were identified by names of their inaugural project manager, the team names were identified throughout the opening credits.
    - Kinetic, at the time the episode aired, was called "Team Heidi."
    - Arrow, at the time the episode aired, was called "Team Frank."
  - "Team Frank" had to set up a second tent after their loss was announced.
  - After firing Martin, Trump remarked that this was one of his toughest decisions in the history of the show - while Frank was primarily responsible for the loss due to setting the car wash price arguably low, Trump noted that he had a certain "tremendous fire" that Martin lacked.
  - Nicole strained her voice while shouting out her team's promotional slogans, which was exacerbated by a throat infection she picked up during the night after the task, leaving her barely even able to speak in the boardroom, and resulting in her voice being rather hoarse for the rest of the season.

=== Episode 2 – Pink Is the New Black ===
- Airdate: January 14, 2007
- Task sponsor: Trina Turk
- Task scope: Each team was tasked to create a line of swimsuits (women's, men's) for Trina Turk. The team with the most sales following a runway show (with the contestants as their own models) of the swimsuit line would win. Trump also promised the winning team would be exempt from the next task.
- Judges: Donald Trump; Ivanka Trump
- Kinetic project manager: Heidi
- Arrow project manager: Nicole
- Winning team: Kinetic
  - Reasons for win: The team stayed with a conservative line of swimsuits as noted by the buyers, in contrast to Arrow's line, and primarily won due to Arrow's missteps. Kinetic earned $20,011.
  - Reward: An opportunity to meet up with Playboy founder Hugh Hefner and enjoy a pool party with his girlfriends and several of the Playmates at his Mansion.
- Losing team: Arrow
  - Reasons for loss: Arrow actually sold more women's swimsuits than Kinetic, but fell down badly when it came to the men's products. Carey, in charge of the design of the team's swimsuits, insisted on making their men's line too short and tight, and in colors and prints that would only appeal to gay men, as noted by many of his teammates; one particularly was pink, very short, and revealed "too much information" when worn by Carey himself. As a result, the buyers at the fashion show bought less than $400 of the male swimsuit line (out of a total $19,616 in sales).
  - Sent to boardroom: Nicole, Carey, and Michelle
  - Firing verdict:
    - Nicole brought up Carey's insistence on his designs and the lack of their appeal to the majority of the population. Other team members noted that Nicole, as PM, approved of Carey's designs despite her own questionable opinion of them.
    - Carey defended his design selection, alluded to in the episode title, "Pink is the new black", and also pointed to Nicole's poor management and Michelle's disagreeable personality. Trump didn't think any man would want to wear a set of pink swim shorts, causing Ivanka to interject and point out that she'd seen men wearing pink swim shorts herself, and that the problem was more the combination of the color and styling. Heidi also didn't see the pink color as inherently a problem until Trump produced the actual shorts in the boardroom, causing her to comment that they looked more like a pair of women's bikini shorts.
    - Trump did not see Michelle as deserving to be in the boardroom, and despite his being unhappy at both Carey and Nicole for attempting to evade any responsibility for the defeat, he felt that Carey's continued defense of his designs validated his team-mates' accusations that he had not been willing to take on-board criticism, ultimately leading to his dismissal.
- Fired: Carey Sherrell – for designing products that lacked widespread appeal, and for not taking any responsibility for the team's defeat. Trump acknowledged that he had worked hard on the task, but could not direct the blame towards anyone else on Arrow, and was also bothered by Carey's attempts to blame Michelle despite her not being at fault for the loss.
- Notes:
  - Both Derek and Carey revealed that they are gay during this episode. Despite Carey targeting the gay market with his swimsuit designs, Derek admitted that he didn't find them appealing.
  - For the first time, the team names seen prior in the opening credits were officially used in this episode. Unaired footage available from the Apprentice web site shows the teams selecting their respective names after the return of Frank from the boardroom last week (Week 1) and prior to the start of the task this week.
  - As Trump promised, the entire Kinetic team will be exempt from the third task.
  - Trump permitted Carey to keep the pink swimsuit he wore for the show as a parting gift before the firing.
  - While James and Ivanka raised concerns that she had failed to properly supervise Carey, Nicole was not considered to be primarily responsible for the loss since she motivated her team, met task deadlines, and held the team together. Michelle was also not held responsible for the loss as per the final boardroom.

=== Episode 3 – Hollywood Walk of Shame ===
- Airdate: January 21, 2007
- Prologue: Arrow was split into two teams, with Aaron voluntarily and Michelle on Trump's discretion stepping up as project managers and to select their teams. Aaron's team included James and Stefani, while Michelle's team included Nicole, Frank, and Tim.
- Task sponsor: Starline Tours of Hollywood and Loews Santa Monica Beach Hotel
- Task scope: Each team was to design a unique Hollywood bus tour. The winner would be the team that had the best approval ratings from the tour bus customers.
- Judges: Donald Trump; Ivanka Trump; Donald Trump Jr.
- Team Aaron project manager: Aaron
- Team Michelle project manager: Michelle
- Winning team: Team Aaron
  - Reasons for win: The team came up with a plan to use the Los Angeles Laker Girls to entice people onto the bus, and based on a pre-tour evaluation of the tour, offered water and snacks and provided a well-rounded tour experience with a high approval rating of 82% from the customers. Much of the credit for the win went to Stefani, who took over as the tour guide after James put in a very poor performance in the role at the start of the tour (coming across as hyperactive and incomprehensible), earning her much praise from the tourists and Ivanka.
- Losing team: Team Michelle
  - Reasons for loss: Michelle and her team did not sleep the night before the tour, which made the tour route not well-planned and highly repetitive (based on customer comments). Problems with the microphone arose, which annoyed the customers. The team received an average approval rating of 58% from customers.
  - Sent to boardroom: No Boardroom Sessions. - Michelle tendered her resignation immediately after the task results were revealed. Trump initially decided to carry out a boardroom session anyway, and told Nicole, Frank and Tim that they would return to the boardroom and one of them would be fired, meaning that two people would have left this week. After some discussion with his advisers though, Trump unanimously agreed that no one on Team Michelle deserved to be fired and decided to cancel the end-of-task boardroom sessions, figuring that Michelle's resignation meant that she was primarily responsible for the defeat, thus sparing the rest of her team from judgement.
- Quit: Michelle Sorro – at her own discretion. Michelle determined that she did not care anymore about the job interview, and thus decided to tender her resignation after the results were tabulated. She stated that she did not expect herself to sleep in tents when her team loses and she cannot stand it anymore. Trump lectured Michelle about how quitting was an extremely bad decision but accepted her resignation.
- Notes:
  - Kinetic didn't have to participate in this task since they earned the show's first-ever team exemption from week 2.
  - Since Kinetic didn't have to participate, they spent the whole day at Loews Santa Monica Beach Hotel
  - No special team names were given to the sub-teams of Arrow, and thus are identified by their project managers.
  - This is the second time that someone quit, and the first time as part of the normal Boardroom sequence. The first resignation occurred during season 3.
  - This is the first appearance of Donald Trump Jr. as a Boardroom member this season.
  - The episode ended with Frank, Nicole, and Tim jumping and celebrating after hearing that Mr. Trump canceled the boardroom.

=== Episode 4 – Drive-Thru Duel ===
- Airdate: January 28, 2007
- Prologue: Trump called both teams and recognized that Arrow has been prematurely decimated since he hated that Michelle quit since Week 3. So Trump instructed Kinetic to select one member to step up and volunteer to help Arrow in order to even up the teams. Aimee, Surya, and Marissa volunteered to help Arrow but Arrow selected Surya as their new team member.
- Task sponsor: El Pollo Loco
- Task: Each team was to create a new menu item for the El Pollo Loco chain, and then run an El Pollo Loco store for a day to promote that item. The winning team was the one with the most sales (by dollar amount) of their new item.
- Judges: Donald Trump; Sean Yazbeck
- Kinetic project manager: Heidi
- Arrow project manager: Aaron
- Winning team: Arrow
  - Reasons for win: Arrow promoted their store with balloons and banners and also attempted to make bulk sales outside of the store. As a result, the store was constantly busy during the day, with one boss ordering 23 of their products for his employees. Their total sales were $488.
  - Reward: A private performance from Andrea Bocelli on the beach followed by a fireworks show. Tim received praise from his teammates for his own piano playing.
- Losing team: Kinetic
  - Reasons for loss: Unlike Arrow, Kinetic had nearly no marketing advertising their dish and never saw a crowd similar to that gathered by Arrow. Potentially, their dish, combining chicken and fruit, may have also been considered unappealing, as stated by Trump. Their total sales were only $314.
  - Sent to boardroom: Heidi, Marisa, and Aimee
  - Firing verdict: Marisa was blamed by her team for seemingly sticking to a single idea of having all members in both teams in chicken outfits to advertise their item, and for being unable to come up with any other marketing plan. Sean, as viceroy, also noted that the task was lost by marketing, which Marisa was in charge of for Kinetic. While Trump sympathized somewhat with Marisa, feeling that the team as a whole had neglected the marketing, he became increasingly bothered by her over-zealous defense of herself, to the point where she repeatedly interrupted and shouted down her team-mates and even Trump and Sean, ultimately leading to Trump deciding the evidence against Marisa was too overwhelming.
- Fired: Marisa DeMato – at the recommendation of Kinetic due to her being the weakest link in the team, refusing to come up with any other ideas after the team rejected her initial idea to use chicken outfits, and for being too aggressive and disruptive.
- Notes:
  - Sean Yazbeck, the fifth season's Apprentice, filled in for Ivanka for this task.
  - When finding out there was both dried fruit and chicken in Kinetic's creation, Trump said that he wouldn't eat it.
  - This episode shows a connection between Tim and Nicole.
  - Trump stated that while Marisa's firing was a hard decision, he admits that he sometimes has to listen to the recommendation of others, mirroring what he did during the one-on-one interviews in the first 3 seasons.
  - Aaron was called out by Trump for saying practically nothing in the boardroom, something that would contribute to his firing the following week.

=== Episode 5 – To Bee or Not To Bee ===
- Airdate: February 11, 2007
- Prologue: Donald Trump was away on business for the bulk of the task, including hearing the results and announcing the reward while in front of a crowd in Minnesota, but was back for boardroom sessions.
- Task sponsors: Sioux Honey Association and Ralphs Supermarket
- Task: To harvest and package honey for Sue Bee Honey brands and to sell the harvested honey through assigned Ralphs supermarkets locations. The winner was the team that sold the most honey.
- Judges: Donald Trump; Sean Yazbeck
- Kinetic project manager: Aimee
- Arrow project manager: Aaron
  - Dramatic tension: During the harvesting event, the teams had to put up with angry bees to grab the honey needed for the actual sales of the honey. Kinetic was faced with having a couple of bumps on the road with some honey not on shelves while Arrow was bogged down by lacking honey sales. Derek also got stung by a bee when he went harvesting honey with his team members. Both leaders proved ineffective and indecisive during the task, resulting in Stefani taking over the key decisions on Arrow and even ordering Aaron around, while Derek and Angela decided to step up and take control of Kinetic's marketing after Aimee refused to make key decisions.
- Winning team: Kinetic
  - Reasons for win: Kinetic had a good marketing strategy, with all members creating a buzz in bee suits. They also used Angela and her slogan "Olympic Gold honey" as marketing tools (she was an Olympic winner) and Aimee's signage outside the supermarket labelled "Today is HONEY DAY" also worked in their favor. The price of each honey bottle is $4.99 and 2 for $5. The team sold a total of 345 bottles and earned $836.48 in sales.
  - Reward: A basketball game against and training with basketball legends Kareem Abdul-Jabbar, James Worthy, Los Angeles Lakers coach Phil Jackson, and player Brian Cook.
- Losing team: Arrow
  - Reasons for loss: Aaron performed poorly as a project manager and had no marketing strategy (which Aaron claimed was Surya's responsibility). He also relied too much on repeating the success of the team's success in bulk sales during the previous task, which ended in total failure and Tim and Nicole making no sales whatsoever. The team sold a total of 217 bottles and earned a total of $775.48 in sales.
- Sent to boardroom: Aaron, Surya, and Nicole
  - Boardroom tension: Aaron reveals that Surya was a brand manager for Procter & Gamble and he blames Surya for the loss due to the lack of marketing strategy.
  - Firing verdict: Although Nicole was brought back, she was not held liable for the loss since she did her best as far as bulk sales were concerned, and Trump even said he didn't understand why she was brought back. While Surya did poorly due to his marketing strategies, Trump decided to give Surya a second chance.
- Fired: Aaron Altscher – for intentionally leaving the tasks to his subordinates, poor leadership and strategy skills, not helping the team during the supermarket portion of the task, not explaining his decision to bring Nicole back into the boardroom, and contributing nothing of value to the previous week's boardroom sessions.
- Notes:
  - In actuality, the Lakers are second to the Boston Celtics in NBA championships. (The Celtics have won 16, while the Lakers have won 14.) Trump, apparently unaware of the Celtics' record, inaccurately claimed that the Lakers had won more NBA championships than any other team.
  - The developing relationship between Tim and Nicole was announced by Frank to everyone at the first Boardroom, including Trump.
  - Unless Trump forbids, the opposing teams are apparently allowed to communicate with each other over the hedge that separates Tent City from the pool area that is part of the mansion, as shown by two scenes during the show.

=== Episode 6 – Travel Sweepstakes Smackdown ===
- Airdate: February 18, 2007
- Task sponsor: Priceline.com
- Task: Teams were required to set up a kiosk at their assigned Westfield Shoppingtown malls and then to get people to sign up for Priceline.com. The team with the most sign-ups over a 2-hour period (during lunch hours) would win the task.
- Judges: Donald Trump; Donald Trump Jr.
- Kinetic project manager: Aimee
- Arrow project manager: Surya
- Winning team: Arrow
  - Reasons for win: Tim came up with the idea to stagger their prize money into many separate prizes, which proved effective. During the task, several members, particularly Frank, were very aggressive on driving customers to their kiosk. They were able to sign up 359 people.
  - Reward: A private surfing lesson with professional and world-renowned surfers (Pat O'Connell and Lisa Andersen) on Santa Monica beach and brunch at Gladstone's of Malibu.
- Losing team: Kinetic
  - Reasons for loss: Though Derek and Jenn were told that the mall had about a 50% Hispanic consumer base from a mall executive, they did not relay this number to Aimee figuring that the demographics of the mall were more than obvious to anyone that was walking through it. As a result, they were not prepared to handle both the verbal and written language barrier at their kiosk, despite Derek and Muna being fluent in the language. They were only able to get 326 people to sign up.
- Sent to boardroom: Aimee, Derek, and Jenn
  - Firing verdict: Trump took time to bring up a couple of issues, including Aimee not understanding the mall's demographic, as well as Derek and Jenn not informing Aimee of this information. When Trump asked the executives' opinion on the task and both executives complimented Derek and Muna's use of Spanish since many people at the mall do not understand English. Trump also brought attention to the fact that Aimee refuses to hear from her subordinates during critical moments, along with Aimee's weak overall leadership.
- Fired: Aimee Trottier – for not understanding the demographics of the mall's visitors and for not listening to her team for suggestions. While Derek and Jenn did not relay the important demographic information to their project manager, Aimee was eliminated instead for her lack of leadership qualities, refusing to take any fault for the loss and acting bossy towards her team and the other team the previous week.
- Notes:
  - For the first part of the task, two Priceline.com executives observed the teams. After the two Priceline.com executives gave Trump feedback, Donald Trump Jr. took over the executives' place as the "close-of-task" judge.
  - While Nicole was thought to have suffered an ankle injury due to increasing waves, a hospital visit concluded that Nicole was stung by a jellyfish. Tim escorted Nicole to the hospital, prompting the two to skip their visit to Gladstones. This eventually led to a romance between Tim and Nicole after the reward as Tim and Nicole of Arrow were showing each other affection near the pool.
  - Derek revealed that he is half-Latino and that his father is from Colombia.
  - This is the first time a sponsor served as an in-task judge before Donald Trump Jr. took over as verdict judge.
  - Aimee flipped off Derek and Jenn and gave what Derek called the "eyes of death" before getting into the cab, and proceeded to badmouth the entirety of Kinetic during her exit interview, going so far as to claim that she'd have been better off telling the rest of the team to stay at the mansion and doing the whole task herself.

=== Episode 7 – Life in the Luxury Lane ===
- Airdate: March 4, 2007
- Task sponsors: Lexus
- Task: Teams were to create an event for Lexus VIP customers to present the features of the new Lexus LS 460. The team with the best rating from the event customers wins the task.
- Judges: Donald Trump; Randall Pinkett
- Kinetic project manager: Jenn
- Arrow project manager: Surya
- Winning team: Arrow
  - Reasons for win: The team promoted the concept of luxury properly and allowed their guests to either take a look at the Lexus LS 460's features or to just simply take a test drive of the LS 460. Arrow received an overall rating score of 94 points (out of 100) from the attendees.
  - Reward: A chance to participate in creating a freestyle rap with Snoop Dogg. Surya had claimed to be a Snoop Dogg superfan. However at the reward his teammates, in particular Stefani noted how he just stood on the wall the whole time and never spoke to anyone. She even wondered why he bothered to come.
- Losing team: Kinetic
  - Reasons for loss: The team had a horrible theme using go-karts to promote the Lexus VIP. The team's signage banners also looked out of sync and lousy, which was blamed on poor time-management by the promotional team of Derek and Angela. Their presentation was also shaky and flawed, and the team ultimately received an overall rating score of 84 points (out of 100) from the attendees.
- Fired (first time): Derek Arteta – for his unprofessional behavior before the final intermission, jokingly referring to himself as white trash.
- Sent to boardroom: No final boardroom – While Jenn had earned her team's respect (albeit the loss), Trump had enough information to hold her liable for the loss, regardless of whom she would have selected to accompany her (and Angela, who she said she would definitely bring back if given the chance along with Derek had he not been fired) in the final boardroom.
- Fired (second time): Jenn Hoffman – for poor decision-making throughout the task and allowing the go-karts to be approved.
- Notes:
  - Randal Pinkett, the season 4 Apprentice, served as a substitute boardroom judge.
  - After Jenn's firing, Trump commented on his displeasure with Angela's poor performance in this task.
  - Effective this episode, The Apprentice 6 moved to 10 pm ET/PT, 9 pm CT/MT on NBC.
  - This is the first time that a candidate was fired in the middle of an ongoing boardroom session. The remaining Kinetic members appeared to believe that the boardroom session was over after Derek's firing, but Trump shocked them by revealing that the boardroom would continue and the person who was most responsible for the loss would also be fired. Jenn tried to persuade Trump that Derek was to blame for the loss because he was responsible for the signage and the go-karts, and that no one else needed to be fired, but Trump rejected the suggestion, pointing out that before he was fired the rest of the team had defended Derek as being the only person who came up with any ideas.
  - The commercials for this episode indicated that two words would cause a double firing. This was a reference to Derek's comment in the boardroom.

=== Episode 8 – Bend It Like Donald ===
- Airdate: March 11, 2007
- Task sponsor: GNC
- Task scope: Each team was to create a short halftime show promoting the GNC brand at a Los Angeles Galaxy soccer game. The team with the best show, as determined by GNC's vice president of marketing, would win the task
- Judges: Donald Trump; Bill Rancic
- Kinetic project manager: Kristine
- Arrow project manager: Surya
- Winning team: Kinetic
  - Reason for win: The VP of marketing for GNC said that Kinetic promoted the GNC brand closely, and the crowd apparently liked Kinetic's show.
  - Reward: To golf with Trump and the head of TaylorMade Golf, Mark King, at Trump's own golf course in Los Angeles (Trump National Golf Club Los Angeles). The winners also received a full set of golf clubs from Taylor Made based on the Donald J. Trump Signature Collection.
- Losing team: Arrow
  - Reason for loss: The vice president felt that Arrow did not promote the GNC brand well and that they presented a difficult boxing story to follow.
- Sent to boardroom: Surya, James, and Tim
  - Firing verdict:
    - Although Surya defended himself by repeatedly mentioning his 5–2 team record, the general consensus of the team was that he was not functioning well as a leader or a team player. Surya said that he's a good follower, but Trump said that The Apprentice would have to be a leader rather than a follower.
    - Surya held Tim responsible for coming up with the idea for the losing project and held James liable for being disloyal and very hard to work with during the task.
    - While Tim confirmed what Surya had said and that James tended to make things difficult, he stated that he would still fire Surya over James.
    - Trump believed that it was a very tough decision to make, because every single person on Arrow thought that Surya should be fired.
- Fired: Surya Yalamanchili – for losing the respect of his entire team, acting disrespectful to Trump in the boardroom, attacking his team-members and showing them no loyalty, whining to Trump that he liked being on Kinetic better than Arrow and outright admitting that he wished he never moved over to Arrow which was deemed to be pathetic and unprofessional by Trump and Bill, driving his team crazy with his constant brainstorming sessions on this task and the two previous ones when they were trying to get work done and meet deadlines, and because the rest of the team unanimously agreed that Surya was not responsible in any real way for their victory the previous week (or arguably even the one prior to that).
- Notes:
  - There was no corporate shuffle despite Kinetic having a two-person deficit.
  - Realizing that Kinetic has been decimated, Kristine opted to step up as project manager to bring the team back to its winning track, hoping that herself, Muna, Heidi, and Angela will be the final four.
  - This halftime show took place during the Los Angeles Galaxy's confrontation with the Houston Dynamo on June 24, 2006. This game happened to be during the World Cup and both teams were without star players.
  - Based on reports of people that attended this game, the crowd was asked after both presentations to indicate which show they preferred using colored placards underneath their seats. These reports also indicate that the performance from both teams was not well received by the fans.
  - Bill Rancic, the original Apprentice, filled in for Ivanka as a substitute judge.
  - This is one of those rare occurrences where Donald Trump said "sorry" right after a firing.
  - In his exit interview, Surya commented that 95% of the time he felt like an outsider and this show shows that the best person does not always win.

=== Episode 9 – Soap Gets In Your Eyes ===
- Airdate: March 18, 2007
- Task sponsor: Dial Soap
- Task: Each team was to create and direct a webisode soap opera featuring a new Soft Scrub bathroom cleaner. The best webisode as determined by Dial Soap executives would win the task.
- Judges: Donald Trump; Ivanka Trump
- Kinetic project manager: Kristine
- Arrow project manager: James
- Winning team: Arrow
  - Reason for win: While Arrow had a weak cliffhanger in their webisode, they nonetheless explained the product well, and Nicole's knowledge of soap operas served them well in structuring and editing the webisode.
  - Reward: A private flight via Blue Star Jets to Sacramento to meet California Governor Arnold Schwarzenegger for tea and to hear his story of his success at the California State Capitol.
- Losing team: Kinetic
  - Reason for loss: The executives said that Kinetic had a great cliffhanger, storyline, and webisode. However, they couldn't get a lot of information about the product due to the dialogue (presented by Muna) in their webisode. Kinetic had to cut out some of the scenes entirely because it was too difficult to understand what Muna was saying about the product. Kristine initially asked Muna to direct the webisode, but she refused to do so and demanded to be given the central acting role.
  - Sent to boardroom: No final boardroom – Muna asked Angela and Heidi to back her up and say that Kristine should be dismissed, but this backfired when both women said that Muna herself was both the weakest overall member of the team and the person most responsible for the loss. Trump therefore felt he had no choice but to fire Muna.
  - Firing Verdict:
    - Heidi said to Muna that "if I would have one person, it would be you to be on my team".
    - While Trump faulted Muna for being uncooperative and demanding a role she was clearly unqualified to fill, he also criticized Kristine for giving Muna the role for no reason other than to keep her quiet, and for not having Heidi give the critical information instead.
    - While Kristine was absent throughout the early part of making their product and could have made a much better judgement call by not using Muna's voice (which was plagued by her heavy Jamaican accent) for the webisode, it was deduced in the boardroom that Kristine was a stronger candidate overall.
- Fired: Muna Heaven – for implicating herself in the boardroom, for having inarticulate and incomprehensible dialogue in the team's final product, insisting on having the central role instead of Heidi, and for being uncooperative with the team during this task.
- Notes:
  - James becomes Arrow's project manager due to his belief that it's either "now or never."
  - After Muna's firing, Heidi said that choosing between Kristine and Muna was the hardest thing she had ever done in her life.
  - This is the second time in this season that Donald Trump apologized for firing a candidate, with the first being Surya.
  - Before the boardroom, Muna was seen reading the Bible whereas Kristine was reading Trump's book, Trump: The Art of the Deal. Kristine commented on how Muna should not be reading the Bible since God is not the one making the decision in the boardroom.
  - Arnold Schwarzenegger, who the winning team met as their reward, would later replace Donald Trump as the host of The Apprentice after becoming president.

=== Episode 10 – Girls on Rollerskates ===
- Airdate: March 25, 2007
- Prologue: Trump directed James to send a member of Arrow to Kinetic since Kinetic was "decimated." With no volunteers, and with James stating that Frank and Stefani were invaluable to him, he selected Nicole. Nicole felt this choice was personal to send her to team Kinetic and said she will do anything to win this task to show James that he is wrong. With Tim and Nicole now on opposite teams, the two had several discussions throughout the episode over the hedge separating the pool from Tent City. The teams meet up at the Grauman's Chinese Theatre with Trump and Ivanka.
- Judges: Donald Trump; Ivanka Trump
- Task sponsor: Universal Studios Hollywood
- Task: Teams had to sell special on-the-spot front-of-the-line passes and discount season passes at Universal Studios Hollywood theme park using Adwalker, an advertising and media platform worn by its operators. The winning team would be the one with the most sales.
  - As noted by James, this was the first task in this season where both teams had to compete in the same area for sales.
- Kinetic project manager: Angela
- Arrow project manager: James
- Winning team: Arrow
  - Reason for win: Arrow used a fixed booth with signage and offers of free water bottles with the sale to draw customers at the entrance to the park. They also aggressively went after customers that were waiting in line to talk to Kinetic players and were able to take the business away from Kinetic. They earned over $32,000 in sales.
  - Reward: A private helicopter ride above Los Angeles
- Losing team: Kinetic
  - Reason for loss: The members of Kinetic, while using some sex appeal and being more mobile by being on roller skates, lacked credibility and a selling presence due to virtually no signage and were not as aggressive as Arrow in soliciting customers. The team sold approximately $7,000 less than Arrow.
    - Nicole predicted correctly that Arrow would be using large signs and sales pitches during Kinetic's brainstorming session for this task, and argued they needed to do something to counter it. This eventually resulted in the idea for using roller skates to increase mobility.
- Pre-boardroom: After James told his team that he will be going after the person who came up with the roller-skates idea (Nicole), Tim told Nicole that through the hedges so she could be prepared. This discloses some possible disloyalty on Tim's part.
  - Boardroom tension: After both teams heard the results, Kinetic was upset with Arrow's aggressive tactics of "stealing" customers away, but Trump dismissed this as being strictly business. Angela continued to argue this in her defense during the boardroom, though admitted that it would have not countered the entire $7,000 difference in sales. James said that Nicole was the weakest link in his team out of members from Arrow.
  - Sent to boardroom: No final boardroom – despite defending herself strongly, Angela only weakly blamed Nicole (for the roller blades idea) and admitted that neither Kristine nor Heidi were at fault for the loss, which made Angela the obvious choice to be fired.
- Fired: Angela Ruggiero – for poor quality leadership and for not defending herself properly per Ivanka. Trump ultimately held Angela liable for the loss since he could not fire anyone else.
  - Postmortem: Nicole told Trump to request Tim to transfer over to Kinetic, but Trump said Tim was disloyal and that Nicole should dump him.
- Notes:
  - This was another rare occasion where Donald Trump said sorry after firing a candidate. This could be due to his immense respect for Angela as an Olympian, and that she was arguably just as strong as anyone else in her team. This was also the third time this season (and consecutively) where Trump said sorry.

=== Episode 11 – Shut Your Smartmouth ===
- Airdate: April 1, 2007
- Prologue: Tim's loyalty has been questioned in the eve after the elimination of Angela.
- Task sponsor: SmartMouth
- Task: Teams were to create a supplement for the Los Angeles Times newspaper for SmartMouth with photo access, studio, and graphic designers from B Squared Design & Print. The team with the best supplement as being judged by the executives will win.
- Judges: Donald Trump; Ivanka Trump
- Kinetic project manager: Heidi
- Arrow project manager: James
- Winning team: Kinetic
  - Reason for win: According to the executives, the team used an eye-catching shape to their insert, focused on the use of the product throughout the day, and kept the message clear and simple.
    - Solid performance recognition: The SmartMouth executives used Kinetic's insert as their ad in the next run of the Los Angeles Times.
  - Reward: An in-mansion visit with their significant others (Kristine's husband, and Heidi's and Nicole's mothers), including a meal prepared by Kristine's husband, Ludo Lefebvre, who is a well-known chef in the Los Angeles area Trump initially said that the winning team would be visited by the finest chefs anywhere in the world.
    - This was the first time Heidi's mother visited California.
- Losing team: Arrow
  - Reason for loss: Both teams had solid presentations. But according to the executives, Arrow had a complicated, disjointed, and ineffective brochure. The front page made the people look like they were yawning (as opposed to needing mouthwash), and the scientific chart was difficult for people to understand. Trump said that the decision wasn't even close, and described Arrow's supplement as "total crap."
- Pre-boardroom: Tim met Nicole and her mother through the hedges, with Nicole commenting that her mother is the most loyal person Nicole has ever met. Nicole asked her mother for advice about her relationship with Tim, and her mother told Nicole to focus on the work tasks. The executives thought that James was a good leader and that Stefani was confident and presented herself well.
  - Initial Boardroom: Trump told Arrow to compare their ad with Kinetic's ad. In addition, Trump and Ivanka jointly grilled Arrow due to a number of errors.
  - Sent to boardroom: No final boardroom – Trump felt that Stefani had been easily the team's best performer in this task, and that James had done enough in the previous tasks to justify being kept on. Despite feeling that Frank hadn't contributed much this task, and had been difficult to lead, he ultimately considered Tim to be responsible for coming up with the original idea behind the supplement.
- Fired: Tim Urban – for coming up with a very poor concept for their supplement, being disloyal towards the team and for allowing his relationship with Nicole to distract him during the tasks.
  - Right after Tim's elimination, Trump called out the entirety of Team Arrow (barring only Stefani) for doing a lousy job on this task, with which Heidi and Ivanka both agreed.

=== Episode 12 – Las Vegas, Baby! ===
- Airdate: April 8, 2007
- Prologue: Trump conducted another twist: Frank, James, and Stefani were told to move back into the mansion. Trump also directed that the six remaining candidates divide themselves into three teams with two members each. Henceforth, there would be no more project managers and, fortunately, no more "Tent City".
  - Teams: Frank and Heidi, Kristine and Nicole, and James and Stefani
  - Kristine thought that she was in Heidi's shadow, since the two always worked together. To prove to Trump that she had her own strengths, Kristine chose to pair up with Nicole.
  - Both Heidi and Frank were the original project managers from week 1.
- Sponsor: No sponsor – internal promotion involving the second building of the Trump Organization's Las Vegas Hotel and Tower
- Task: Each team was to prepare promotional materials for selling condominiums for the second tower to be constructed as part of the Trump International Hotel and Tower in Las Vegas. Teams had access to the demonstration suite and were given graphic artists to assist them. Trump would decide which team(s) would win and continue to the next task, and which would lose on this task. Trump initially stated that he would fire both members of the worst team on this task.
- Judges: Donald Trump; Donald Trump Jr.
- Who succeeded at the task: James and Stefani
  - Reasons for success: As their presentation was first, Trump noted that both the presentation and additional material would be tough to beat by the other teams. Their theme was "The Height of Luxury." After the presentation, Heidi complimented it by saying she was "100% impressed."
- Reward: There were no rewards, except that James and Stefani were guaranteed slots in the final two weeks of the job interview, and were able to assist Trump in deciding which two of the other four to fire.
- Who failed at the task: Frank and Heidi, Kristine and Nicole
  - Reasons for Frank's and Heidi's failure: Frank's and Heidi's presentation did not have any sales point, unlike the other teams. Heidi stumbled and rushed through the two-minute oral introduction before the video, and she failed to mention their sales point. Their brochure did not contain any photographs, but only long text passages which Trump compared to a book that no one would read. Trump also noted that their video was poor in quality. Heidi seemed to lose her confidence in this task. When they were asked what the theme of their presentation was, Heidi said "World Class Luxury" but later contradicted herself by saying it was "World Class Amenities." However, Heidi forgot to articulate this theme during the presentation. Lack of a theme was a major criticism of the presentation.
    - Heidi and Frank engaged in heated argument, and Frank accused Heidi of changing the subject and being dishonest to Trump and Don Jr. Heidi revealed that the brochure was done 15 minutes prior to the boardroom session.
    - Frank and Don Jr. stated that Heidi was contradicting herself and also stated that Heidi lied in front of Mr. Trump about 4 times in the boardroom. Frank also told Heidi she keeps double talking herself.
  - Reasons for Kristine's and Nicole's failure: Nicole had difficulty activating the powerpoint presentation, prompting Trump to ask James to help her. Their theme was "Las Vegas is Turning Gold." Trump noticed that the contact telephone number on the brochure of Kristine and Nicole was different from that on the brochure of James and Stefani. Trump requested that James and Nicole step out of the boardroom to verify which telephone number was correct. After calling both numbers, James and Nicole verified that the brochure of James and Stefani contained the correct number of 6711, while the brochure for Kristine and Nicole had the wrong telephone number of 9933 which upon calling the number they discovered it was not even a number for a Trump related organization.
    - Trump noted that getting the wrong telephone number was a fatal mistake. Kristine admitted to this mistake.
    - While Nicole was outside, Kristine argued to Trump that Nicole slept while Kristine designed the brochure. Kristine displayed lack of teamwork by talking poorly of her partner behind her back. Kristine thought of herself, and not of her team, by picking Nicole over Heidi to work with in this task. Kristine thought that she would be the star player of the team composed of herself and Nicole.
  - Change of heart: Though Trump had originally said that he would fire both members of the worst team, he instead decided to fire one person from each team, noting that one candidate on the Kristine/Nicole team had made such a severe error that they would be fired for it.
- Fired: Heidi Androl and Kristine Lefebvre for the following reasons:
  - Heidi Androl – for giving a terrible presentation and excessive dishonesty in the boardroom, despite having an excellent PM record of 3–1. Heidi stated that the task failure was the worst in her career and that she would agree with Trump 100% if Trump chose to fire her solely based on this task. Trump fired Heidi immediately after she made this comment, and said that he was especially disappointed in her performance, given that she had been his favorite to win since the earliest weeks of the season, and he had repeatedly called her a "superstar."
  - Kristine Lefebvre – for putting the wrong telephone number on the brochure. Kristine protested that she was not given a chance to defend herself, but Trump considered her mistake to be so severe that it rendered her unworthy of being the Apprentice - additionally, it was the only reason the Kristine/Nicole team lost. Trump had to say "You're fired" twice, at which point she stopped protesting. Trump then yelled at everyone to get out of the boardroom.
- Post-episode Apprentice firsts:
  - The final two members from the original Kinetic team were fired. As a result, this is the first time that the final four candidates consist of members from one original team, Arrow.
  - Stefani becomes the first person to reach the final four without once serving as project manager on a task.
- Notes:
  - Trump made it clear that had Kristine and Nicole's brochure had the correct telephone number, he definitely would've fired Frank and Heidi.
  - The construction of Trump Tower Las Vegas was offered as a job in Season 2 to winner Kelly Perdew.
  - After being fired, Kristine and Heidi were offered an opportunity to appear in a pictorial for Playboy magazine. Kristine accepted the offer (while Heidi refused), and she appeared in the June 2007 issue.

=== Episode 13 – The Final Four ===
- Airdate: April 15, 2007
- Teams:
  - Kinetic: Frank and Nicole
  - Arrow: James and Stefani
- Prologue: Trump and Don instructed Frank, James, Nicole, and Stefani to head to The Regent Beverly Wilshire Hotel for a cocktail party and meeting with four of the five past Apprentices: Kelly Perdew, Kendra Todd, Randal Pinkett, and Sean Yazbeck.
  - Bill Rancic, the winner of season 1, was unavailable due to business obligations.
  - Perdew asked the final four to split into two teams and then for each team to choose two previously fired candidates to assist them in the final task.
    - Frank and Nicole chose Surya and Tim, James and Stefani chose Aaron and Angela.
- Task Sponsor: Renuzit (Dial Soap)
- Task Scope: The two teams were asked to produce a 60-second commercial for Renuzit that would be shown in a movie theater before the feature film.
- Executives' feedback: The Renuzit executives noted that James's and Stefani's team worked very well complementing each other's strength and weaknesses, while Frank took over while Nicole stayed behind the scenes. They did note that Frank was a very hard worker.
- Twists:
  - Trump made it clear at the beginning of the task that there would be no winners or losers for this task.
  - All four candidates were sent home by Trump after the Renuzit task, and were asked to return for the final live episode, during which Trump will hire one person out of the final four.
- Notes:
  - Dial, with its Renuzit brand, is the second sponsor to sponsor two Apprentice tasks in one given season.
  - As there are no more project managers or team names, each team was identified simply as "Frank & Nicole" or "James & Stefani". However, a Kinetic Corporation sign could be seen in the background of Frank's and Nicole's editing room, while an Arrow Corporation sign could be seen in the background of James's and Stefani's editing room.

=== Episode 14 – Decision Time ===
- Airdate: April 22, 2007
  - The final episode was aired live before a televised audience at the Hollywood Bowl (except in the west).
  - It was the first time Trump chose his apprentice from four candidates, given the twist he pulled in Episode 13.
- Apprentice Jobs: Trump gave the four finalists the choice of overseeing the construction of Trump at Cap Cana (in the Dominican Republic) or Trump Towers Atlanta.
  - Stefani and Nicole chose the Trump at Cap Cana
  - James and Frank chose Trump Towers Atlanta
- Fired in the middle of the episode: Frank Lombardi, for hiring Surya, who disliked him; and Nicole D'Ambrosio for her nepotism during the final task. In addition, Donald Trump preferred James's & Stefani's work from both weeks 12 and 13.
- The two finalists: James and Stefani
  - Brief appearance: George H. Ross commented on the two finalists.
    - George said that James sometimes seemed to lose focus.
    - Stefani didn't really step up to show leadership as a project manager.
- Fired at the conclusion of the episode: James Sun, since Trump was bothered by certain "things" that James had said, although what these were was never revealed.
- Hired: Stefani Schaeffer. While she never stepped up as project manager, Stefani won the respect of many people. She was well liked because she doesn't take credit for things and she never made any significant mistakes throughout the interview process.
  - No one pointed out that Trump's "dynasty" rule of recurring project managers essentially made it more difficult for people to step up, even when the PM was not the primary reason for a victory, a reason why Schaeffer was the first to be hired without being a project manager for a task.
  - Task: Schaeffer will oversee the Trump at Cap Cana project on a one-year contractual basis with a salary exceeding $250,000.
- Notes:
  - Stefani Schaeffer becomes the first practicing attorney and the second woman to be hired by Trump.
  - Stefani also becomes the first person to win the U.S. edition of The Apprentice without ever being the project manager for a task.
  - This finale, as with the third season, was aired only for one hour.
  - About midway through the live outdoor broadcast, it began to rain.

== Ratings ==
The sixth season of The Apprentice was by far the worst-received season of The Apprentice, and also the least watched on its initial run (the tenth season would later receive considerably lower viewing figures). Critics and many fans alike were very unfavorable to the various radical changes the show had made (such as being a project manager until failing, or having a winning project manager serve in the boardroom and advise Trump on whom to fire) and thought the show lost its original appeal. They believed that producers were trying to incorporate more of a sensational edge to the show, rather than focus on the aspects of the business world, and some speculated that the show was trying to specifically mirror Survivor, with having the weekly losing candidates live in tents with no power or running water. Moreover, footage of the actual projects that candidates would work on was substantially cut, after the tasks in this season often took up as little as a fifth of the episode, whereas the tasks in previous seasons took up between a third and a half of the episode's running time. Trump later blamed creator and executive producer Mark Burnett for these ideas, who ironically is also the creator of Survivor. The 90-minute premiere of the sixth season averaged 9.1 million overall viewers and a 4.1/10 rating/share in the Adults 18–49 demographic. The figure for total viewers for the show's sixth season debut was much lower than that of the show's fifth season debut. The second episode of season 6 averaged 7.3 million viewers.
