= Sun Tzu: War on Business =

Singaporean reality television series

- Genre: Reality television
- Directed by: Marilyn McFayden
- Country of origin: Singapore
- Original language: English
- No. of episodes: 13

Production
- Running time: 30 minutes

Original release
- Network: Channel NewsAsia
- Release: March 1, 2010 – 27 August 2011

Sun Tzu: War on Business (literally: "Master Sun — War on Business") was a Singaporean reality television series broadcast by Channel NewsAsia and distributed by BBC Worldwide. In the show presenter James Sun traveled around the world helping entrepreneurs and their businesses to achieve their goals using the principles of The Art of War. The series premiered in March 2010 and last aired in 2011.

== International distribution ==
The show aired in the US on the National Geographic Channel in March 2010.
