= Wait But Why =

American blog website

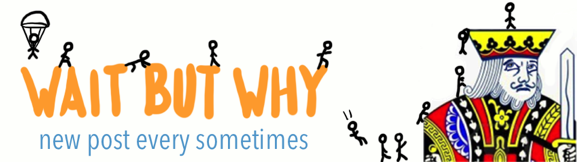
- Available in: English, Chinese
- Editor: Tim Urban
- Website: waitbutwhy.com
- Launched: 2013; 13 years ago
- Current status: Online

Wait But Why (WBW) is a website founded by Tim Urban and Andrew Finn and written and illustrated by Urban. The site covers a range of subjects as a long-form blog. Typical posts involve discussions of various topics, including artificial intelligence, outer space, and procrastination, using a combination of prose and rough illustrations.

On May 21, 2014, Urban posted "The Fermi Paradox", a post that became extremely popular. A 2016 Ted Talk by Urban on procrastination, based on concepts from the blog, had garnered over 74 million views by March 2025, making it the second most viewed TED Talk in history. A post on the blog about Elon Musk and Neuralink was produced with involvement from Musk himself.

In 2019, Marie Boran of The Irish Times summarized the website as a collection of "lengthy, thoughtful and well-written blog posts", praising them for being an "accessible and entertaining primer on human nature".
