= Dramabeans =

Review website for Korean dramas

- Website type: Recap and discussion site for Korean dramas and films
- Available in: English
- Website: dramabeans.com
- Commercial: Yes
- Launched: 2007
- Current status: Active

Dramabeans is an English-language website that features in-depth reviews and analyses of Korean dramas, and also serves as a fan forum for those programs featured. It was founded in 2007 by the blogger Javabeans.

== History ==
Dramabeans began as a blog by Korean American "Sarah", better known by her online pen name of "javabeans" in 2007 as a site to recap and debate Korean dramas. As the popularity of the blog increased, she registered the domain name. In 2010, Dramabeans reader "Jen", better known as "girlfriday", became a second regular reviewer-contributor to the site, and the two were able to make the site their full-time job. Jen and Sarah have both left their roles at Dramabeans as the costs of running the site outgrew the online advertising revenue. The site is now funded and run by a Korean-American James Sun who has solely supported the financial maintenance and growth of the site since 2015.

== Methodology and impact ==
The core of the site is an archive of recaps of each episode of selected dramas, with comments serving as a forum on the episode reviewed. Most new miniseries from the big three (KBS, MBC and SBS) will receive a recap of the first episode, with those which the recappers find most interested in having every episode in its 16 to 24-episode run being reviewed, longer dramas are not covered. Both javabeans and girlfriday are professional writers and deconstruct each episode as both writers and as ethnic Koreans with an understanding of the Korean entertainment industry, Korean story telling tropes, and mores and customs. The popularity of Dramabeans has paralleled the growing popularity of Korean dramas as part of the Korean Wave in the West, serving as a primer to Korean mores, culture and attitudes to Western audiences.

The site also features articles regarding casting and preproduction of upcoming dramas, and behind-the-scenes news of airing dramas.

== Awards and nominations ==
Year	Award	Category	Awarding body	Result	Ref.
2014	DARI Awards	Special Award	Korea Creative Content Agency, Korea Cultural Center-Los Angeles	Won	

== Publications ==
Year	Title	Authors	Publisher	ISBN
2013	Why Do Dramas Do That?	javabeans, girlfriday	Dimension Four LLC	ISBN 978-0-9860598-0-3
