= Tim Urban (author) =

American writer and blogger

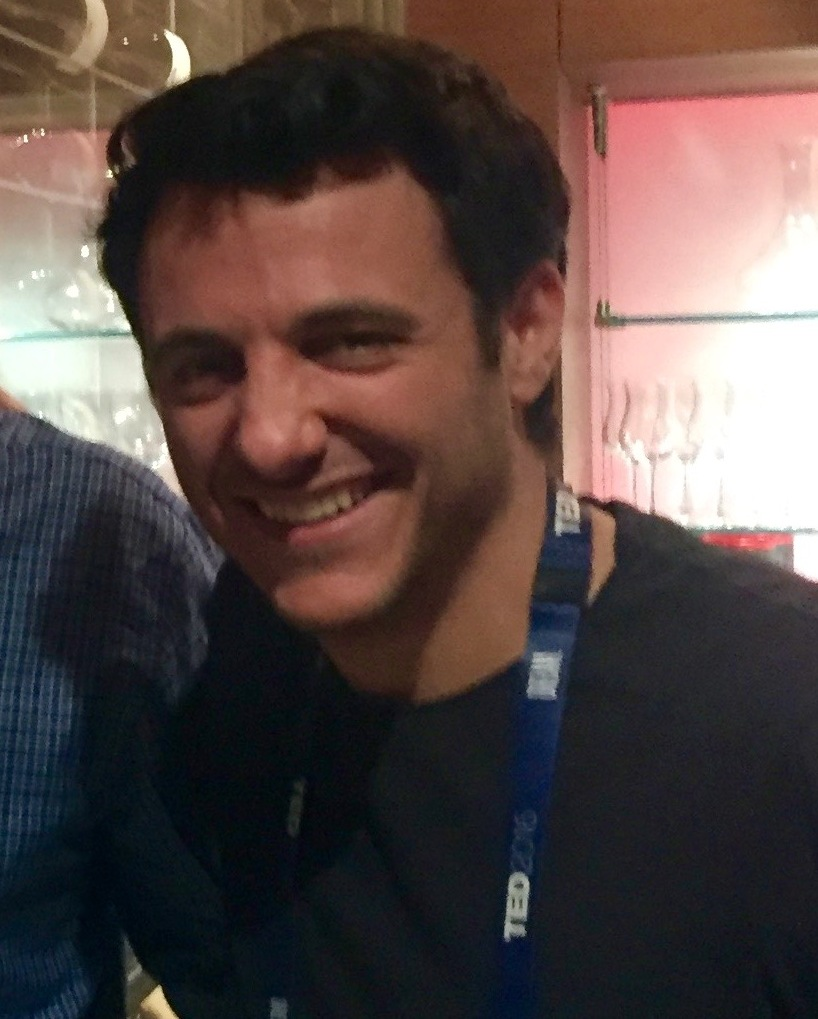
- Urban posing for a photo at TED2016
- Born: Newton, Massachusetts, U.S.
- Education: Harvard University
- Known for: Wait But Why

Tim Urban is an American author and blogger. He is the co-founder of Wait But Why, a long-form blog, of which Urban is the writer and illustrator.

== Early life and education ==
Urban was born in Newton, Massachusetts. In his childhood, Urban befriended Andrew Finn, who would later become his business partner for multiple ventures.

Urban graduated from Harvard University in 2004. During his time at Harvard, Urban participated in a study where he was locked in a windowless room for 12 days. He was compensated $3,500 for his participation.

== Career ==
In 2005, Urban founded his first blog, Underneath the Turban.

In 2007, Urban was a contestant on Season 6 of the NBC reality television show The Apprentice. At 24 years old, he was the youngest candidate of that season. Urban finished in 7th place out of 18 contestants, getting fired in week 11.

In 2011, Urban and Finn co-founded ArborBridge, an educational technology company catered to international students planning to attend college in the United States. The company was originally a sister company to the Launch Education Group, also co-founded by Urban and Finn in 2007, but was later merged into ArborBridge in 2014.

In 2013, Urban and Finn co-founded Wait But Why, a long-form blog. Urban is the writer and illustrator for the blog. In 2015, in direct collaboration with Elon Musk, he created a series of posts about Tesla and SpaceX, and later broke down the concepts behind Neuralink.

In 2016, Urban gave a TED Talk about his experiences with procrastination. As of 2025, the TED Talk has amassed 75 million views, making it the second most viewed TED Talk in history. In the talk, he described the brain of a procrastinator being distracted by an "instant gratification monkey" and saved at the last minute by a "panic monster". To him, procrastinators follow a reverse of the Eisenhower matrix, a method in which tasks are relegated into four quadrants with the first containing the most pressing and important tasks which contribute to the person's long-term goals with each following quadrant of lesser goals with the fourth being of no importance. He finds that the "instant gratification monkey" keeps them mostly in quadrants 3 and 4 doing unimportant, non-urgent tasks and only working on quadrant 1 when the "panic monster" emerges to compel them due to a looming deadline.

In 2023, Urban published the book What's Our Problem?: A Self-Help Book for Societies. The book was endorsed by Elon Musk on X.

== Bibliography ==
- The Story Of Us: A Deep Dive Into Human Evolution (2022) ISBN 9781787633957
- What's Our Problem?: A Self-Help Book for Societies (2023) ISBN 9798987722602
