= Trump Towers Atlanta =

- Rendering of the proposed building

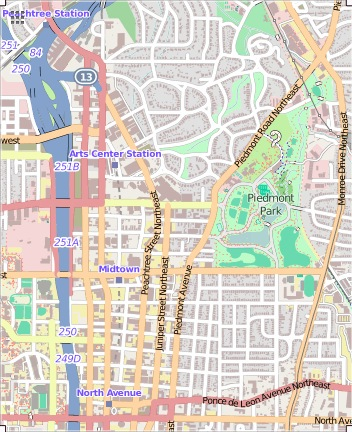
- Location within Atlanta Midtown Trump Towers Atlanta (Atlanta) Trump Towers Atlanta (Georgia) Trump Towers Atlanta (the United States)

General information
- Status: Never built
- Location: Midtown Atlanta, Georgia, United States
- Coordinates: 33.7885°N 84.3882°W

References
- "Emporis building ID 273465". Emporis. Archived from the original on July 24, 2015.

Trump Towers Atlanta was a proposed high-rise project that was to be built in Atlanta, Georgia, United States. Located at the intersection of 15th Street and West Peachtree Street in Midtown Atlanta, the project was unveiled in 2006 and promoted by Donald Trump in a 2007 season finale of The Apprentice. The project ultimately faltered, and the property was foreclosed upon in 2010.

== History ==
The project began in March 2006, when Atlanta-based firm Wood Partners purchased the property at the intersection of West Peachtree Street and 15th Street (adjacent to the High Museum of Art) for $21 million. The firm partnered with Dezer Properties and planned it as a project under the Trump brand, with Donald Trump confirming his attachment to the project in August 2006. The Trump Organization claimed that Trump was neither the site owner nor the project's developer, and in their 2016 book Trump Revealed, authors Michael Kranish and Marc Fisher claim that Trump's involvement with the project was limited primarily to licensing his name for the project. The project would involve the creation of two curved glass towers, one 47 stories tall and one 38 stories tall, housing over 560 condominium units. A large sign bearing Trump's name was to be displayed over the lobby, and a design firm partially owned by Kenny Rogers was hired to design the interiors. In total, the project was expected to cost approximately $300 million. Phase I would have seen the construction of the taller of the two buildings at a cost of $260 million.

On the season finale of the sixth season of The Apprentice, which aired April 22, 2007, the Atlanta project was presented as one of two projects that season's winner could choose from, alongside a luxury resort in the Dominican Republic, with the winner ultimately choosing the Dominican project. In the months following the announcement, advertisements were purchased in several publications, such as Atlanta, which highlighted Trump's involvement in the project. A September 2007 issue of Atlanta claimed that the project would near completion by 2010. However, by 2010, the site was in foreclosure, and it was sold at auction in 2012. In 2015, permits were filed to build a new apartment building on the site, which was completed in 2017.

== See also ==
- List of things named after Donald Trump
