= Kristine Lefebvre =

American lawyer

- Born: January 31, 1969 (age 57); Frankfurt, Germany
- Education: Metropolitan State College; Nova Southeastern University
- Occupations: Former attorney, model, business woman
- Spouse: Ludovic Lefebvre

Kristine Leigh Lefebvre (born January 31, 1969) is a former lawyer, and was a contestant on NBC's reality show The Apprentice who made it into the final group of six contestants before being fired for getting a phone number wrong. The credentials which garnered Lefebvre a spot on the show include her education and career as an attorney. Her undergraduate degree is from the Metropolitan State College in Denver, and her Juris Doctor degree is from Nova Southeastern University in Florida. As a professional, she has represented celebrities Shaquille O'Neal and Dan Marino as well as the Staples Center sports complex and the Los Angeles Kings hockey team. However, as of March 17, 2025, her California attorney license status was "Inactive".

Following her appearance on The Apprentice, Lefebvre appeared nude in the June 2007 issue of Playboy as well as on that issue's cover. Incidentally, she was a member of the winning team on the second episode of The Apprentice, in which the task was to design and manufacture a line of swimwear for Trina Turk; Lefebvre modeled one of the team's swimsuits at a fashion exhibition at the task's conclusion. The reward for winning was a trip to the Playboy Mansion for an opportunity to meet Hugh Hefner and enjoy one of his infamous mansion parties.

According to the article accompanying her Playboy pictorial, Lefebvre has provided legal expertise and written contracts for several women to have posed for the magazine, including Pamela Anderson and Debbie Gibson.

Lefebvre serves on the board of directors for the non-profit foundation, C.H.A.S.E. for Life, an organization striving to make the education of infant/child CPR and choking maneuvers free and readily available to anyone that has their hand on a child.

Lefebvre is a cervical cancer survivor.
