= Ludo Lefebvre =

French chef and restaurateur

- Born: 1971 (age 53–54); Auxerre, Burgundy, France
- Culinary career
- Cooking style: Nouvelle Cuisine
- Current restaurant(s): Petit Trois, LudoBird, Chez Maggy, Delphine, Ludobab
- Previous restaurant(s): LudoBites, L’Esperance in Vézelay, L'Orangerie, Bastide, Trois Mec, Trois Familia
- Website: ludolefebvre.com

Ludovic Lefebvre (French pronunciation: [lydo ləfɛvʁ]; born 1971) is a French chef and restaurateur. He has owned and operated several restaurants in Los Angeles.

== Early life and training ==
Lefebvre was born in Auxerre, Burgundy and grew up in Charbuy. His interest in food began during childhood in his grandmother's kitchen. In his early teens, he worked doing menial tasks at local restaurant Maxime.

Lefebvre's culinary training began at age 14 at the restaurant L’Esperance in Vézelay under chef Marc Meneau, where he worked for three years. He then worked with Pierre Gagnaire at his eponymous restaurant in Saint-Étienne (now closed), then with Alain Passard at L'Arpège, then with Guy Martin at Le Grand Vefour.

== Career ==
=== Restaurants ===
In 1996, Lefebvre moved to Los Angeles and began working at L'Orangerie under Gilles Epie. In 2004, he moved to the restaurant Bastide on Melrose Place. He created a series of pop-ups called LudoBites. In 2010, Lefebvre opened a food truck, LudoTruc, selling fried chicken. In October 2013, he opened a brick and mortar location, LudoBird, inside the STAPLES Center. In March 2016, the second location of LudoBird opened at City Walk, Universal Studios Hollywood.

In 2013, Lefebvre opened Michelin-starred Trois Mec in partnership Jon Shook and Vinny Dotolo. It was named to Esquire's and GQ 's Best New Restaurants lists. The restaurant's Grilled Baby Corn with Black Garlic was named one of Food & Wine's Best Restaurant Dishes of 2013. In 2014, Lefebvre opened Petit Trois, a bistro concept, next door to Trois Mec. Petit Trois was a 2015 James Beard finalist for Best New Restaurant.

=== Television appearances ===
In 2006, Lefebvre appeared on Iron Chef America, challenging Mario Batali in a battle of Big Eye Tuna, where Batali prevailed. Beginning in 2009, Lefebvre appeared on the first and second seasons of Top Chef Masters. He was a guest judge on season 8 of Hell's Kitchen in 2010, and season 20 in 2020. In 2011 alongside his wife, Krissy, he starred in a seven-episode series entitled Ludo Bites America on the Sundance Channel in which the couple open pop-ups in various cities.

In 2013, Lefebvre appeared as a judge/mentor on the ABC cooking competition show The Taste. In 2016, he hosted Season 5 of Mind of a Chef. In 2020, he was a guest chef on the first episode of Selena Gomez's cooking series, Selena + Chef. In 2022, he co-hosted the TBS cooking competition Rat in the Kitchen with Natasha Leggero. Lefebvre appeared on the October 1, 2025 episode of Mel Owen's season of The Golden Bachelor showing Mel and his one-on-one date with Debbie how to make a French omelet and cooking for them.

=== Books ===
- Crave: The Feast of the Five Senses (2005)
- LudoBites: Recipes and Stories from the Pop-Up Restaurants of Ludo Lefebvre (2012)

== Personal life ==
Lefebvre married Kristine in 1999. The couple resides in Sherman Oaks, California with their children.

== Recognition ==
- Chevalier of the Order of Arts and Letters (2015)
- Relais & Châteaux named him one of the World's 50 Greatest Chefs
