= Stefanie Schaeffer =

American lawyer

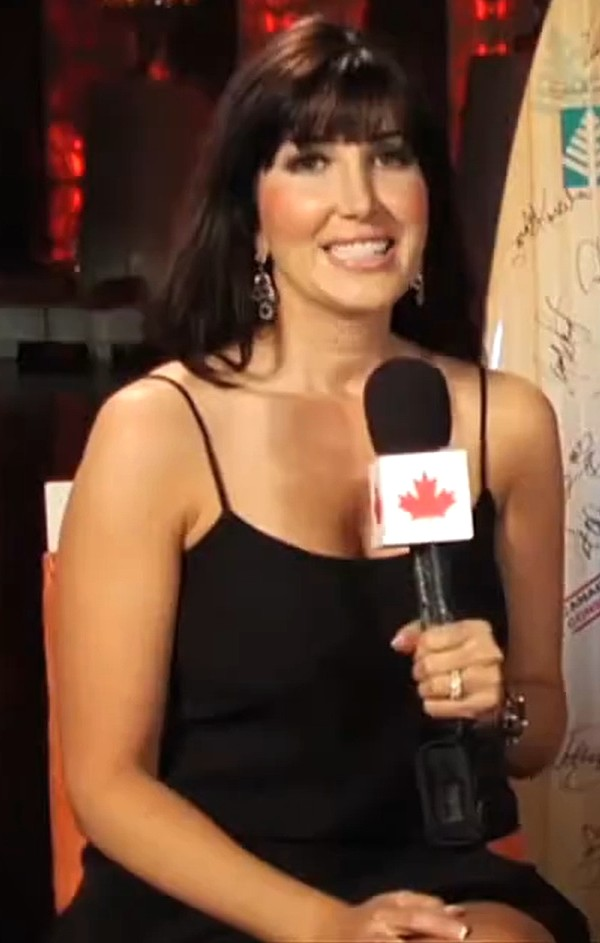
- Schaeffer in 2012
- Born: 1974 or 1975 (age 51–52); Burbank, California, U.S.
- Education: English and psychology (University of California, Riverside); J.D. (Southwestern University School of Law)
- Occupations: Real Estate Broker's License, On Air Personality, Motivational Speaker

Stefanie Schaeffer (born 1974/1975) is an American defense attorney and television presenter from California. She was the winner of The Apprentice: Los Angeles, the sixth season of the reality show The Apprentice. She is currently the host of Know Your Rights TV, a news and legal webisodic.

== Early life and education ==
Schaeffer was born in Burbank, California and was raised in Palm Springs.

She had a double major in college - English and psychology - and graduated from the University of California, Riverside. Schaeffer graduated from Southwestern University School of Law in their SCALE program.

== Career ==
Selected as a Los Angeles Lawyer "Young Rising Star" in 2006 for excellence in law, Schaeffer was a trial attorney for California defense firm Stockwell, Harris, Widom, Woolverton & Muehl.

She joined the firm on August 16, 2006, prior to The Apprentice. She defended California employers against workers' compensation, subrogation and discrimination claims, and defended large real estate developers in construction defect litigation. She worked for Goldman, Magdalin & Krikes, LLP.

She is a member of the alumni association board of directors at Southwestern Law School.

== The Apprentice ==
Schaeffer was hired in the sixth season of The Apprentice. Schaeffer is the first practicing attorney (season-two winner Kelly Perdew graduated from law school but chose not to practice) and the second woman to be hired by Trump. Schaeffer oversaw the Trump at Cap Cana project in Punta Cana, Dominican Republic on a 1-year contract (with a starting salary exceeding US$250,000) as an owners' representative for Trump at Capcana, and also became the Vice President of sales and marketing for Trump International Hotel and Tower in Las Vegas.

== Filmography ==
Year	Show	Role	Notes
2007	The Apprentice	Herself	14 Episodes
2007	Live with Regis	Herself	April 24
2007	Reality Chat	Herself	April
2007	KTLA	Herself	May 5
2007	Sexiest Stars of Reality TV	Herself	November
2007	Red Eye w/ Greg Gutfeld	Herself-Panelist	November 27
2008	TV Guide Network 411	Herself	April 11
2008	KTLA News	Herself	April 11
2008	The John Kerwin Show	Herself	May 7
2008	Miss USA Pageant	Herself	May
2008	The Golf Minute	Herself	May 19
2009	The Golf Fix	Herself	April 6
2009	BMW Charity Pro AM	Herself	May 14–16
2010	Wealth Without Risk	Herself	April 11

== Personal life ==
Schaeffer lives in Los Angeles, California.

Preceded by Sean Yazbeck	The Apprentice Winners; Season 6	Succeeded by Piers Morgan
