= Donald Trump and golf =

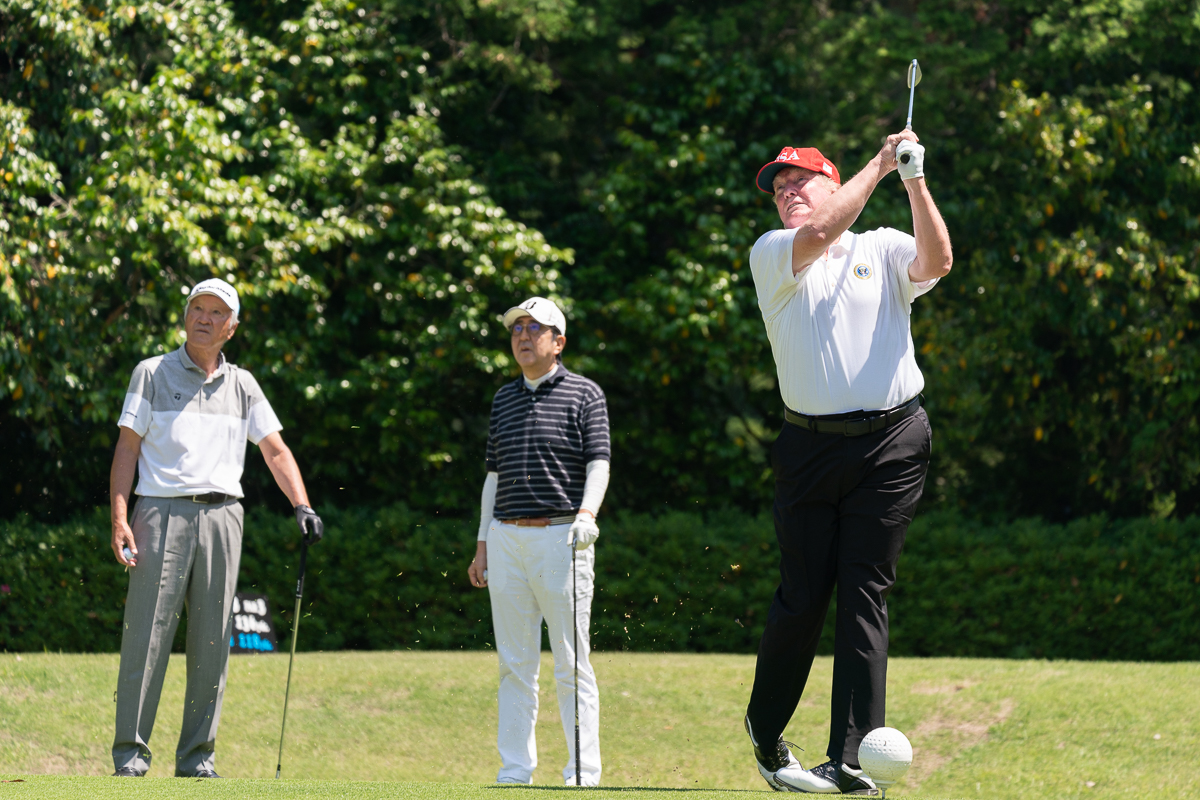
Trump playing golf with Japanese prime minister Shinzo Abe in 2019

Throughout his career as a businessman and politician, Donald Trump has had a relationship with the sport of golf. As a real estate developer, Trump began acquiring and constructing golf courses in 1999. By 2016, he owned 17 golf courses worldwide through his holding company, the Trump Organization.

Courses owned by Trump have been selected to host various PGA and LPGA events, including the 2022 PGA Championship, although the PGA terminated this in the aftermath of the January 6 United States Capitol attack in 2021. A spokesman for the Trump Organization said that "This is a breach of a binding contract and they have no right to terminate the agreement."

Following his first election in 2016, Trump broke precedent with recent presidents and chose not to divest from his business holdings, including his golf courses. Although this was not illegal, ethics lawyers and journalists identified potential conflicts of interest. At least three lawsuits (D.C. and Maryland v. Trump, Blumenthal v. Trump and CREW v. Trump) were filed claiming that foreign payments at Trump golf courses and hotels violate the Emoluments Clause of the U.S. Constitution. These lawsuits were dismissed.

== Trump as player ==
Trump, according to Jack Nicklaus, "loves the game of golf more than he loves money". According to Golf Digest, his handicap is as low as 2.8, a figure that sportswriter Rick Reilly dismisses at length in his book Commander in Cheat: How Golf Explains Trump.

Trump began playing golf while attending Fordham University. In the introduction to his 2005 book The Best Golf Advice I Ever Received, Trump wrote, "for me and millions of people—men, women, young and old around the world—golf is more than a game. It is a passion".

Trump's love of golf has also affected American diplomacy. Prime Minister of Japan Shinzo Abe played golf with him five times, helping the two leaders to become personally close. After Trump's victory in the 2024 United States presidential election, President of South Korea Yoon Suk Yeol reportedly began playing golf again to similarly benefit his country when Trump was again president.

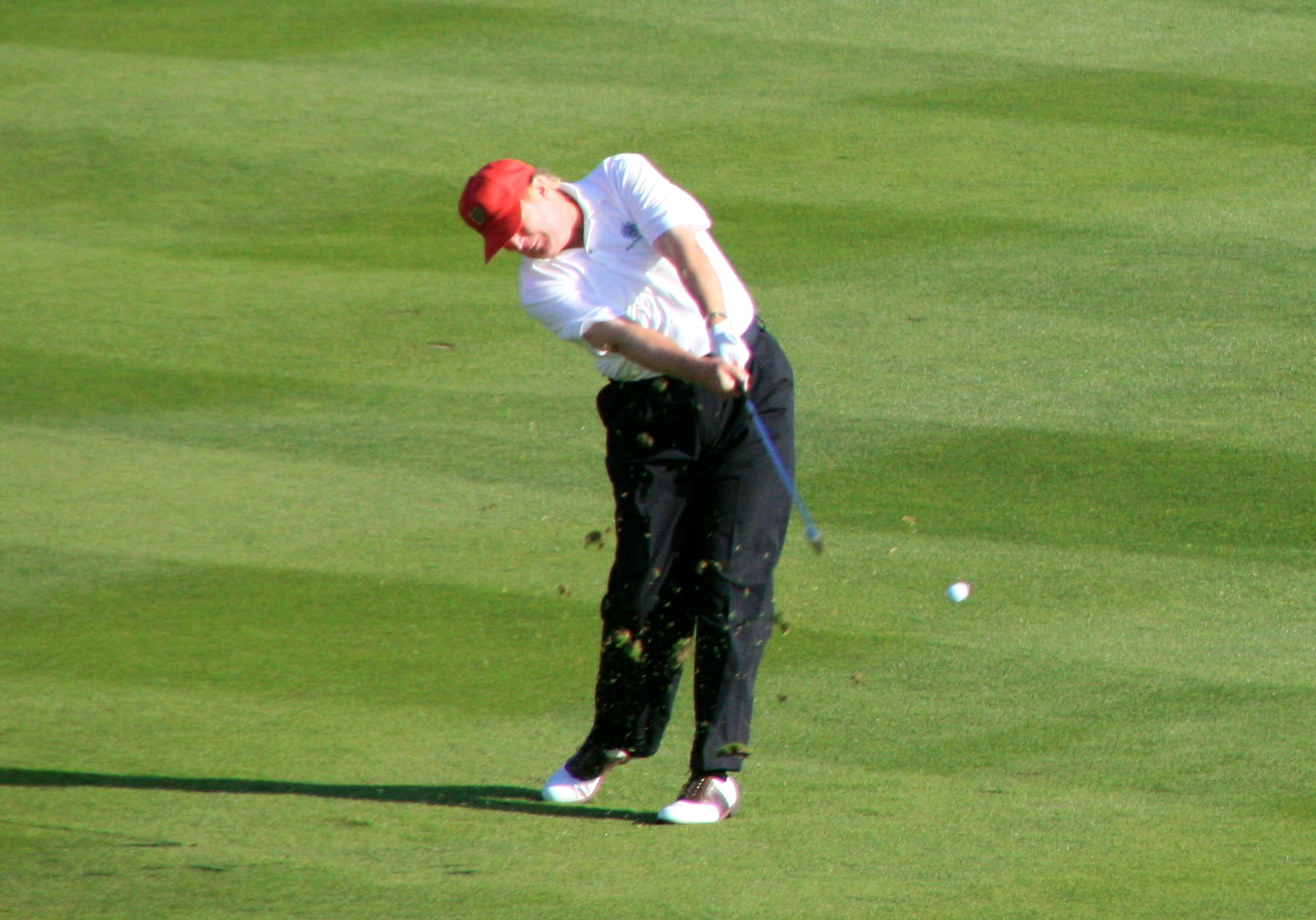
Donald Trump golfing in 2006

In 1999, Trump opened his first golf course: the Trump International Golf Club, West Palm Beach in Florida. Land for the US$45 million course was acquired through a lawsuit against Palm Beach County, Florida, after Trump's purchase of the Mar-a-Lago resort. By 2007, Trump owned four courses around the US. After the 2008 financial crisis, Trump began purchasing existing golf courses and re-designing them.

Golf courses owned by Trump hosted the LPGA Tour finale from 2001 to 2008, as well as the 2009 US Junior Amateur and US Junior Girls Championships. In 2014, the Professional Golfers' Association of America announced a multi-year partnership with the Trump Organization. The PGA of America selected Trump golf courses to host the 2017 Senior PGA Championship and the 2022 PGA Championship.

In June 2015, Trump announced his candidacy in the 2016 presidential election with a controversial speech which led to companies such as Macy's and NBC cutting ties with the businessman. While speaking on illegal immigration, Trump falsely claimed that Mexico is "sending people that have lots of problems... they're bringing drugs, they're bringing crime. They're rapists. And some, I assume, are good people," drawing criticism from immigration and Latino advocacy groups. The LPGA, PGA of America, PGA Tour, and United States Golf Association issued a joint statement, saying that while the organizations "do not usually comment on presidential politics, Mr. Trump's comments are inconsistent with our strong commitment to an inclusive and welcoming environment in the game of golf."

The PGA of America also decided to relocate the 2015 PGA Grand Slam of Golf—an exhibition match which had been scheduled to take place at Trump National Golf Club, Los Angeles. In 2018, PGA Tour Latinoamérica held its Shell Tour Championship at Trump National Doral Miami's Golden Palm course after plans were announced to demolish the Melreese Country Club in Miami, which had held the event, for a football stadium.

Trump has said he prefers the game of golf to be, in his words, "elitist", telling Golf Digest magazine "I would make golf aspirational, instead of trying to bring everybody into golf, people that are never gonna be able to be there anyway. You know, they're working so hard to make golf, as they say, a game of the people. And I think golf should be a game that the people want to aspire to through success."

In July 2024, an hour-long YouTube video was released of Trump playing 18 holes with Bryson DeChambeau.

=== Cheating allegations ===
Interviewed under oath in 2022 before a grand jury, Senator Lindsey Graham was asked if Trump cheats at golf, to which Graham replied: "Some people say you may outdrive him, but you’re not going to outdrive his caddy. It is what it is."

Trump's cheating at golf has been the subject of much commentary. Sportswriter Rick Reilly's book Commander in Cheat: How Golf Explains Trump details Trump's cheating at golf.

Rick Reilly examined a lie Trump frequently tells: "Trump's boast about winning 18 club championships is a lie that's so over-the-top Crazytown it loses all credibility among golfers the second it's out of his mouth." Reilly cites Gary Player: "When Trump told Gary Player he'd won 18 championships, Player scoffed. 'I told him that if anyone beats him, he kicks them out. So, he had to win.'" He describes how Trump's name is only on the wall of golf clubs he owns, and in one case the club wasn't even open at the time he falsely claimed to have won the championship there: "Trump International in West Palm Beach, Florida, has a plaque on the wall that lists all the men who've won the men's club championship. Trump appears three times: 1999, 2001, and 2009. But hold on. The course wasn't even open in 1999."

Tom D'Angelo has examined Trump's long history of cheating at golf. One time, Mike Tirico "hit a 3-wood about 230 yards onto the green on one hole. When he arrived the ball was in a bunker about 50 feet from the pin. 'Tough break,' Trump said. Tirico later was told by Trump's caddie that his shot was about 10 feet from the hole and Trump threw it into the bunker. 'I watched him do it,' the caddie said." D'Angelo also quoted Reilly:

'Trump doesn't just cheat at golf,' Riley wrote. 'He throws it, boots it, and moves it. He lies about his lies. He fudges and foozles and fluffs. At Winged Foot, where Trump is a member, the caddies got so used to seeing him kick his ball back onto the fairway they came up with a nickname for him: 'Pele.' ... 'This guy cheats like a Mafia accountant.'... Reilly said in the Vox interview Trump told him whenever he opens a new golf course he plays the first club championship by himself and declares that the champion and puts his name on the wall.
'But it's usually just him and Melania in the cart and nobody else,' Reilly said. 'He just makes it up.'

Peter Wade described how Trump claimed he scored a 67 at his Bedminster course, eight strokes fewer than Phil Mickelson shot there two weeks earlier. Wade also wrote:

While in office, Donald Trump played more golf than any modern president, and the stories about him cheating at the sport are rampant. There's an entire book devoted to his alleged flaunting of the game's rules. Despite his reputation, Trump insists on claiming he regularly wins tournaments, but suspiciously only at his own courses.

== Golf courses owned or managed by the Trump Organization ==
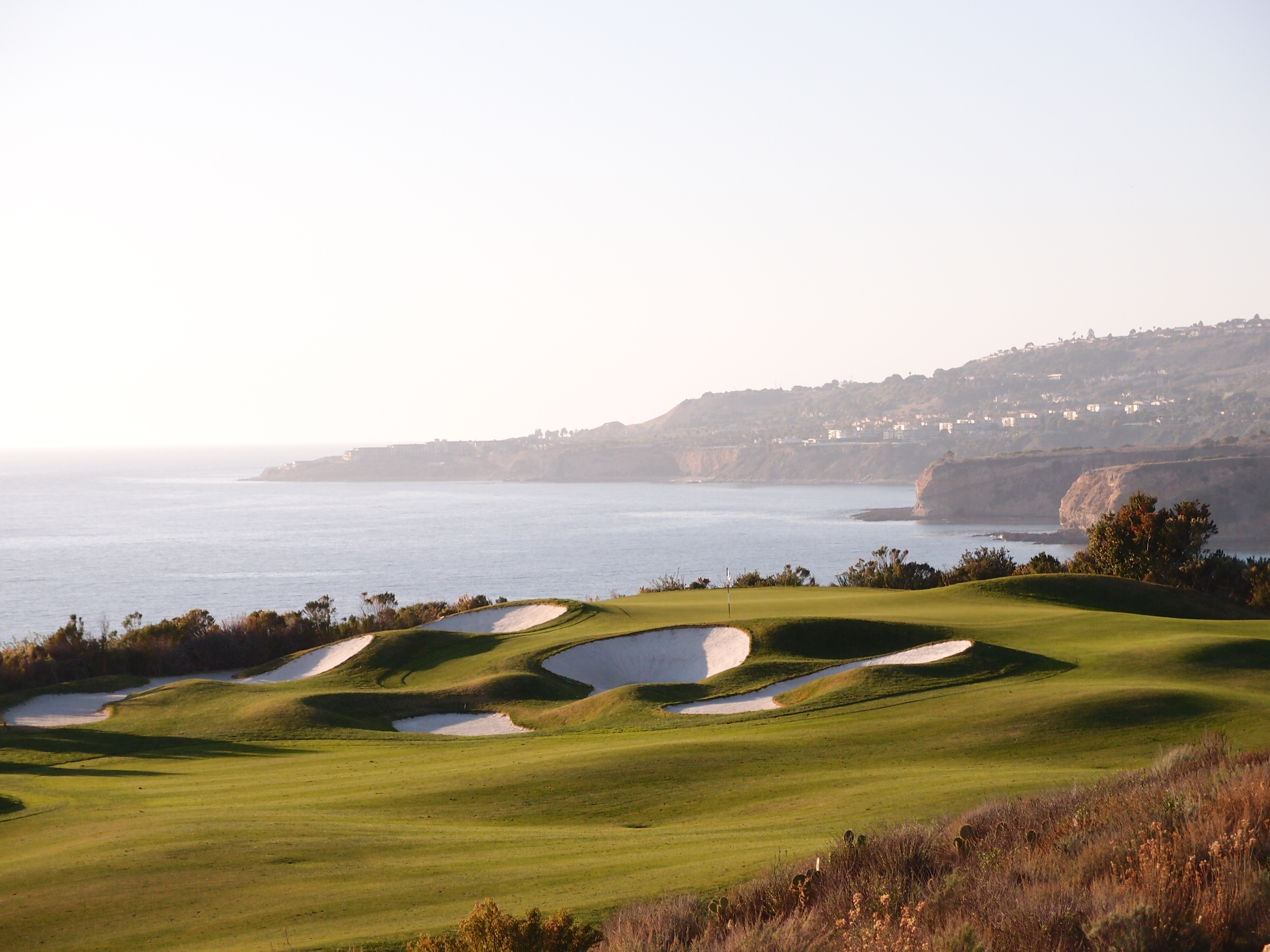
Trump National Golf Club, Los Angeles in Rancho Palos Verdes, California

As of December 2016, Trump owned golf courses in the United States and abroad. Over nearly two decades (as he reported in his 2000–2018 tax filings), these golf courses had combined losses of $315.6 million.

The Trump Organization also operates golf courses not owned by them.

The following is a current list of courses owned and/or managed by The Trump Organization:

- OM denotes courses for which The Trump Organization owns and manages
- M denotes courses for which The Trump Organization manages only
- DM denotes courses for which The Trump Organization developed and previously managed
- F denotes future courses for which The Trump Organization will own and manage

Name	Contribution	Year built	Year purchased	City / town / regency	State / province / council area / barrio / emirate	Country / territory	Comments
Trump National Golf Club Los Angeles	OM	1999	2002	Rancho Palos Verdes	California	United States	formerly known as Ocean Trails Golf Club, designed by Pete Dye and Donald Trump
Trump International Golf Club West Palm Beach	OM	1999	1999	West Palm Beach	Florida	United States	private, 27 holes, designed by Jim Fazio
Trump National Doral Golf Club	OM	1962	2012	Doral	Florida	United States	formerly known as Doral Country Club, 90 holes
Trump National Golf Club Jupiter	OM	2002	2012	Jupiter	Florida	United States	designed by Jack Nicklaus
Trump National Golf Club Bedminster	OM	2004	2002	Bedminster	New Jersey	United States	36 holes, designed by Tom Fazio
Trump National Golf Club Colts Neck	OM	2004	2008	Colts Neck Township	New Jersey	United States	Originally designed by Jerry Pate, reconstructed by Tom Fazio in 2009
Trump National Golf Club Philadelphia	OM	1998	2009	Pine Hill	New Jersey	United States	formerly known as Pine Hill Golf Club, designed by Tom Fazio
Trump Links at Ferry Point	DM	2017	2015	Throggs Neck, Bronx	New York	United States	located in Ferry Point Park, renamed Bally's Golf Links to Ferry Point in January 2024, designed by Jack Nicklaus
Trump National Golf Club Hudson Valley	OM	2001		Hopewell Junction	New York	United States	private, formerly known as Branton Woods, designed by Eric Bergstol
Trump National Golf Club Westchester	OM	1922	1996	Briarcliff Manor	New York	United States	private, formerly known as Briarcliff CC, Briar Hills CC and Briar Hall G&CC, designed by Jim Fazio
Trump National Golf Club Charlotte	OM	1999	2012	Charlotte	North Carolina	United States	designed by Greg Norman
Trump National Golf Club Washington, D.C.	OM	1999	2009	Sterling	Virginia	United States	36 holes (The Championship Course, The Riverview Course), formerly known as Lowes Island Club, designed by Tom Fazio and Arthur Hills
Trump International Resort & Golf Club Bali	F			Tabanan Regency	Bali	Indonesia	designed by Phil Mickelson
Trump International Resort & Golf Club Lido	F			Bogor	West Java	Indonesia	designed by Ernie Els
Trump International Golf Links & Hotel Doonbeg Ireland	OM	2002	2014	Doonbeg	Munster	(Republic of Ireland) Ireland	formerly known as Doonbeg Golf Club, designed by Greg Norman
Trump International Golf Club in Rio Grande	M	2005	2007	Río Grande	Río Grande barrio-pueblo	Puerto Rico	36 holes, formerly known as Coco Beach Golf Club & CC, designed by Tom Kite, Trump management ended in July 2015, renamed Coco Beach Golf Club
Trump International Golf Links Scotland	OM	2012	2010	Balmedie	Aberdeenshire	Scotland	private, designed by Martin Hawtree
Trump Turnberry Scotland	OM	1906	2014	Turnberry	South Ayrshire	Scotland	private, 45 holes, designed by Willie Fernie and Martin Ebert
Trump International Golf Club, Dubai	M	2017	2017	Dubai	Dubai	United Arab Emirates	designed by Gil Hanse and Jim Wagner
Trump World Golf Club Dubai	F			Dubai	Dubai	United Arab Emirates	designed by Tiger Woods

=== Puerto Rico ===
In 2007, the Trump Organization took over the management and licensed Trump's name to the 4-year old, 36-hole oceanfront golf course at Coco Beach, Puerto Rico. It hosted the 2008 PGA Puerto Rico Open, but the club kept losing money and in 2015 filed for bankruptcy protection.

=== Dubai ===
According to the Trump Organization, it is neither the owner nor the developer of the Trump International Golf Club. The financial disclosures Trump filed with the Federal Election Commission in 2016 show that the Trump Organization manages the two golf courses in Dubai. The second Trump-branded golf course, the Trump World Golf Club, was designed by Tiger Woods and developed and built by DAMAC Properties, a company founded by Hussain Sajwani. It was scheduled to be opened in 2017, the year in which a report revealed that migrants working on the project were not being paid on time. In February 2021, it was announced that the inauguration was delayed at least until 2022, as the work on the project was paused. Some officials working on the construction project were told that the delay was because of the COVID-19 pandemic, but developers in the Emirates were reportedly struggling to finish such developments even before the global health crisis.

== Ferry Point, New York ==
From 2015 to 2023, the Trump Organization operated the Trump Links at Ferry Point, New York, a public golf course built and owned by New York City, under a 20-year contract awarded in 2013 by the administration of then-Mayor Bloomberg. Under the agreement, the city paid the course's utility and water bills while collecting no income for the first four years. In the first year of operation, ending in March 2016, the company had $8 million in gross receipts, and the city paid $1 million in water and sewage bills. In the second year of operation, gross receipts dropped 9.5%. For the operating year that ended March 2019, the Trump Organization reported a loss of $122,000; it now faces contractual fees of at least $300,000 per operating year from the city.

On January 13, 2021, New York City mayor Bill de Blasio announced that the city government would be terminating all contracts with the Trump Organization effective November 14, 2021, for "directly incit[ing] a deadly insurrection at the U.S. Capitol." The city of New York also stated that the Trump Organization had defaulted in its contractual obligations because it had failed to attract a major tournament. In June 2021, the Trump Organization sued the city for wrongful termination of the contract. The court allowed the Trump Organization to continue operating the golf course while the case was pending. In April 2022, the judge ruled that "the city had not given a valid legal reason for ending the contract."

In September 2023, the Trump Organization sold the operating rights to gaming and entertainment company Bally's Corporation for $60 million. The course was renamed "Bally Links" in January 2024.

== Coats of arms ==
The coat of arms granted to Davies in 1939

The coat of arms granted to "The Trump International Golf Club Scotland Ltd" in 2012

Trump has used a number of logos in the style of coats of arms for his businesses.

Joseph E. Davies, third husband of Marjorie Merriweather Post and a former U.S. ambassador of Welsh origins, was granted a coat of arms, bearing the motto Integritas, by British heraldic authorities in 1939. After Donald Trump purchased Mar-a-Lago, the Florida estate built by Merriweather Post, in 1985, the Trump Organization started using Davies's coat of arms at Trump golf courses and estates across the country. It was also registered with the U.S. patent and trademark office.

In 2008, Trump attempted to establish the American logo at his new Trump International Golf Links in Balmedie, Scotland, but was warned by the Lord Lyon King of Arms, the highest authority for Scottish heraldry, that an act of the Scottish Parliament from 1672 disallows people using unregistered arms. In January 2012, shortly after the inauguration of the golf course, Trump unveiled the new coat of arms that had been granted to The Trump International Golf Course Scotland Ltd by the Court of the Lord Lyon, Scotland's heraldic authority, in 2012.

From 2014, Trump used the same logo for the Trump International Golf Links, Ireland, the golf resort built from his acquisition of Doonbeg Golf Club.

== First presidency ==
Most of Donald Trump's 2017 revenue was derived from his golf and real estate ventures. Revenue from such ventures increased somewhat in his second term that started in 2025, but was substantially smaller than his new cryptocurrency ventures.

Following his election in 2016, Trump announced that he would not divest his business holdings, as other recent presidents had. Instead, Trump kept his ownership stake in the Trump Organization and appointed his sons Donald Trump Jr. and Eric Trump to manage the business. In an unusual rebuke from the Office of Government Ethics, director Walter Shaub called Trump's actions "wholly inadequate" and "meaningless from a conflict of interest perspective." In an interview with The New York Times, Trump explained: "As far as the, you know, potential conflict of interests, though, I mean I know that from the standpoint, the law is totally on my side, meaning, the president can't have a conflict of interest."

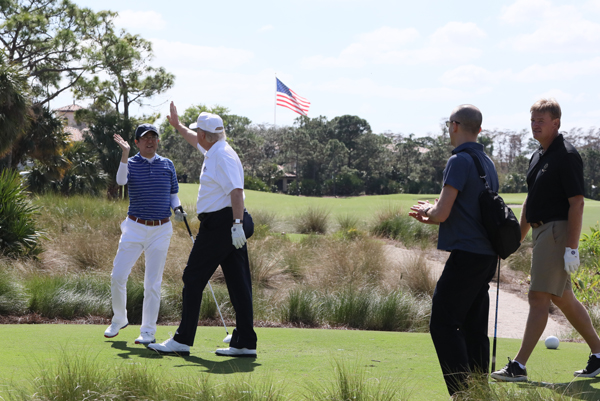
Trump and Shinzō Abe

Just days after his inauguration, a lawsuit was filed in federal court seeking to block the president from receiving payments from foreign government entities at his businesses. The lawsuit alleged that these payments constitute a violation of the Foreign Emoluments Clause of the United States Constitution. In February 2017, Trump invited Prime Minister of Japan Shinzō Abe to play at the Trump International Golf Club in Florida and stay at his Mar-a-Lago resort. Legal and ethical concerns were raised by organizations such as the Sunlight Foundation over foreign payments Trump may receive from the visit. Trump has vowed to donate any such payments to the Treasury Department, although the specifics of this arrangement remain unclear. In June 2017, the attorneys general of Maryland and the District of Columbia filed a separate lawsuit, claiming Trump was "flagrantly violating" the Emoluments Clause.

A 2016 investigation by USA Today found that lobbyists and corporate executives had been purchasing memberships at Trump golf courses to gain favor or contact with the president. Membership fees at Trump courses can exceed US$100,000, leading to ethical concerns over a sitting president accepting money from people lobbying the government.

While campaigning to be president, Trump falsely declared in August 2016: "I'm going to be working for you. I'm not going to have time to play golf". As president, the amount of time he spent golfing generated controversy. Despite having frequently criticized his predecessor Barack Obama for having played golf too much as president, Trump golfed 11 times during his first eight weeks in office, when Obama did not golf at all in his first eight weeks. Golf Digest concluded that Obama played 333 rounds of golf over his two terms, which Golf Digest describes as "...a fairly remarkable amount of golf while in office". Trump visited a Trump Organization property on 428 (nearly one in three) of the 1,461 days of his first presidency and is estimated to have played 261 rounds of golf, one every 5.6 days.

According to CNN, Trump visited Trump-owned golf courses 92 times between becoming president in January 2017 and January 3, 2018, although the White House did not disclose whether he played golf during a visit to a golf course. The White House on some occasions denied that Trump played golf during his visits even after photos published on social media showed him doing so. In November 2018, The Washington Post found that the average number of days between golf rounds was around 5 days for Trump, and around 12–13 days for Obama.

Journalists and ethics experts have alleged that these frequent visits are a means of boosting publicity at the courses to sell more memberships. White House press secretary Sarah Huckabee Sanders defended Trump's golfing, saying that his time on the course was spent "developing deeper and better relationships with members of Congress in which those relationships have helped push forward the president's agenda." CNN reported in January 2018 that Trump was known to have played golf with members of Congress only seven times.

Vice President Mike Pence stayed at the Trump International Golf Links and Hotel Ireland in 2019 while meeting with Irish officials in Dublin. Pence was originally going to end his trip in Doonbeg, where he has familial ties, but Trump suggested that he stay at the Trump property instead, which required daily flights of more than one hour each way.

== 2024 presidential campaign ==
At the presidential debate between Trump and Joe Biden on June 27, 2024, the candidates had a brief open-mic exchange about their golfing abilities.

On September 15, 2024, during a tour of his course in West Palm Beach, Trump's security detail spotted an armed man, Ryan Wesley Routh, behind a fence. The incident is considered to have been the second attempt to assassinate Trump in 2024. Security opened fire on Routh, and he fled in a vehicle; he was later captured.

== Second presidency ==
Trump began his second term on January 20, 2025. He visited his golf clubs 88 times in 2025, amounting to roughly 25 percent of the days during the first year of his second term.

By July, his expenses for taxpayer-funded golf in his second term had reached $52 million. By the end of October, a month into the government shutdown, the total had exceeded $60 million, and by Thanksgiving, it exceeded $70 million. By the end of March 2026, it exceeded $100 million. Those numbers are from HuffPost analyses.

The Trump Golf Tracker estimated higher numbers, with taxpayer costs over $110 million by the end of 2025.

On December 31, 2025, five years into a 50-year lease, the National Links Trust said the Department of the Interior had terminated its lease agreement for three public golf courses in Washington, DC.

On January 2, 2026, it was reported that Trump planned to renovate the Courses at Andrews, known as the "president’s golf course", at Joint Base Andrews in Maryland, about 15 miles from the White House. There was no prior government record of him having played the course, though he had visited the base.

Trump's public schedule said he planned to golf in Bedminster, New Jersey on May 23, 2026, the day his son, Donald Trump, Jr., intended to marry Bettina Anderson in the Bahamas. President Trump canceled the golf trip but did not attend the wedding, saying he would instead stay in Washington.

=== Safe Harbor v. Booz Allen Hamilton ===
In June 2025, Safe Harbor International LLC sued Booz Allen Hamilton, the Internal Revenue Service and the U.S. Department of the Treasury. The five plaintiffs were Safe Harbor investor Donald Wilson; Texas-based Alarm Concepts; Connecticut-based Belpointe Sleepovation Investment; Cedrick Williams; and Shelby Lowman, a professional golf player at Trump National Golf Club Hudson Valley who also paints scenes of Trump's golf courses which Trump has autographed. The plaintiffs accused the IRS of failing to protect their tax information. The Department of Justice paid them $500,000 each. The payment, which was allowed by law, did not end the lawsuit.

== See also ==
- Presidential golf
- List of presidential trips made by Donald Trump (2017)
- List of presidential trips made by Donald Trump (2018)
- List of presidential trips made by Donald Trump (2019)
- List of presidential trips made by Donald Trump (2020)
- List of presidential trips made by Donald Trump (2025)
- List of things named after Donald Trump
- Presidential Conflicts of Interest Act
- You've Been Trumped
