= List of presidential trips made by Donald Trump (2019) =

This is a list of presidential trips made by Donald Trump during 2019, the third year of his first presidency as the 45th president of the United States.

This list excludes trips made within Washington, D.C., the U.S. federal capital in which the White House, the official residence and principal workplace of the president, is located. Also excluded are trips to Camp David, the country residence of the president, as well as Joint Base Andrews. International trips are included. Here are the number of visits per state he traveled to:

- One: Colorado, Illinois, Indiana, Iowa, Mississippi, Nevada, New Hampshire, New Mexico, South Carolina, and West Virginia
- Two: Alabama, California, Delaware, Kentucky, Michigan, Minnesota, North Carolina, and Wisconsin
- Three: Alaska and Georgia
- Five: Louisiana, Maryland, New York, Ohio, and Pennsylvania
- Six: New Jersey
- Seven: Texas
- Thirteen: Florida
- Thirty-five: Virginia
Locations in the contiguous United States that President Donald Trump has visited in 2019.

January (blue) – February (yellow) – March (brown) – April (pink) – May (grey) – June (orange) – July (purple) – August (light blue) – September (magenta) – October (green) – November (red) –

December (light green)
Locations in Alaska President Donald Trump has visited.

Map of trips made by Donald Trump within the United States in 2019: Washington, D.C. 7 or more visits 6 visits 5 visits 4 visits 3 visits 2 visits 1 visit No visits

== January ==
Country/ U.S. state	Areas visited	Dates	Details	Image
Texas	McAllen	January 10	Arriving via McAllen Miller International Airport, President Trump visited the US–Mexico Border at the Rio Grande Valley. He also participated in an Immigration Roundtable in the McAllen border patrol station.	President Trump visits the border in McAllen, Texas; Jan 10, 2019.
Louisiana	New Orleans	January 14	Arriving via Louis Armstrong New Orleans International Airport, President Trump addressed the American Farm Bureau Federation at the New Orleans Ernest N. Morial Convention Center in New Orleans.	President Trump Delivers Remarks in New Orleans; Jan 14, 2019
Virginia	Arlington	January 17	President Trump visited the Pentagon to address missile defense strategy as well as the planned withdrawal of U.S. troops from Syria.	President Trump Delivers Remarks at the Pentagon (46055918614)
Delaware	Dover	January 19	President Trump attended a ceremony at Dover Air Force Base to honor the four Americans who were killed by a suicide bombing in Syria.	President Trump Attends Dignified Transfer of Remains Ceremony

== February ==
Country/ U.S. state	Areas visited	Dates	Details	Image
Florida	Mar-a-Lago, Jupiter, West Palm Beach	February 1–3	President Trump traveled to Palm Beach where he stayed at his private club Mar-a-Lago. Accompanying him were First Lady Melania Trump, their son Barron Trump, and Melania's parents Amalija and Viktor Knav. Jared and Ivanka Kushner were spotted, along with their children, aboard Air Force One by members of the press pool. While in Florida, President Trump played golf with Jack Nicklaus and Tiger Woods at the Trump National Golf Club. The following day, President Trump played golf with acting White House Chief of Staff Mick Mulvaney at the Trump International Golf Club.	
Maryland	Bethesda	February 8	President Trump traveled to the METU Suite of Walter Reed National Military Medical Center in Bethesda, Maryland, for his annual physical examination.	
Texas	El Paso	February 11–12	Arriving via El Paso International Airport, President Trump held a Make America Great Again Rally at the El Paso County Coliseum in El Paso.	
Florida	Mar-a-Lago, Miami	February 15–18	President Trump and First Lady Melania Trump traveled to Mar-a-Lago. President Trump then traveled to Miami, where he spoke at Florida International University to a largely Venezuelan-American audience to address the ongoing leadership crisis in the country and to express his support for opposition leader Juan Guaido.	President Trump Delivers Remarks to the Venezuelan American Community
Vietnam	Hanoi	February 26–28	On February 26, President Trump arriving via Nội Bài International Airport. President Trump stayed at JW Marriott Hotel Hanoi. On February 27, President Trump held bilateral meetings with Vietnamese president Nguyễn Phú Trọng at the Presidential Palace and Vietnamese prime minister Nguyễn Xuân Phúc at the Office of Government Hall. On February 27–28, President Trump attended the second summit meeting with North Korean leader Kim Jong-un at the Metropole in Hanoi.	President Trump's Trip to Vietnam
Alaska	Anchorage	February 28	President Trump briefly visited U.S. service members at Joint Base Elmendorf–Richardson on a refueling stop while on the return trip from Asia.	POTUS visits JBER

== March ==
Country/ U.S. state	Areas visited	Dates	Details	Image
Maryland	Oxon Hill	March 2	President Trump traveled to Oxon Hill where he spoke at the annual CPAC conference.	President Donald J. Trump Delivers Remarks at CPAC
Georgia	Fort Benning	March 8	President Trump and First Lady Melania Trump traveled to Fort Benning en route to survey damage caused by recent tornadoes.	
Alabama	Lee County	March 8	President Trump and First Lady Melania Trump traveled to Lee County to survey damage caused by recent tornadoes as well as meet with first responders, survivors, and local officials.	President Trump and First Lady Melania Trump Visit Alabama
Florida	Mar-a-Lago, West Palm Beach	March 8–11	After surveying the tornado damage in Alabama, President Trump traveled to Palm Beach to spend the weekend at his private club Mar-a-Lago. Upon his arrival Friday night, President Trump spoke to donors the RNC's annual spring retreat in Palm Beach. The following day, President Trump played golf with Lexi Thompson at the Trump International Golf Club. President Trump attended another fundraiser before he departed on the following day.	
Ohio	Lima, Canton	March 20	President Trump traveled to Lima to tour the Lima Army Tank Plant, as well as deliver remarks. Afterwards, President Trump flew to Canton, where he participated in a roundtable with supporters and attended a fundraising reception at the Brookside Country Club.	President Trump delivers remarks at the Army Tank Plant in Lima, Ohio. March 20, 2019.
Florida	Mar-a-Lago	March 22–24	President Trump traveled to Mar-a-Lago where he held a working visit with the leaders of five Caribbean countries: President of the Dominican Republic Danilo Medina, President of Haiti Jovenel Moïse, Prime Minister of Jamaica Andrew Holness, Prime Minister of Saint Lucia Allen Chastanet, and Prime Minister of the Bahamas Hubert Minnis. During this stay, President Trump did play multiple rounds of golf at the Trump International Golf Club with Lindsey Graham, Trey Gowdy, Mick Mulvaney, and Kid Rock.	
Michigan	Grand Rapids	March 28	Arriving via Gerald R. Ford International Airport, President Trump held a Make America Great Again Rally at the Van Andel Arena in Grand Rapids. Following the rally, President Trump flew to his private Mar-a-Lago Resort.	
Florida	Mar-a-Lago, Canal Point	March 28–31	President traveled to Mar-a-Lago following a rally held in Grand Rapids, Michigan. While in Florida, he traveled to Lake Okeechobee, where he toured Herbert Hoover Dike and discuss infrastructure repairs. While at Lake Okeechobee, President Trump was accompanied by Florida governor Ron DeSantis, U.S. senators Marco Rubio and Rick Scott, various members of Congress and commanders of the United States Army Corps of Engineers.	President Trump visits the Herbert Hoover Dike in Lake Okeechobee, Florida

== April ==
Country/ U.S. state	Areas visited	Dates	Details	Image
California	Calexico, Beverly Hills, Rancho Palos Verdes	April 5	President Trump traveled to Calexico to hold a roundtable discussion on border security that included Secretary of Homeland Security Kirstjen Nielsen as well as multiple members of congress, law enforcement and immigration officials and local leaders. In addition to the roundtable discussion, President Trump visited sections of the newly renovated border wall. Following his time at the border, President Trump attended a fundraiser at the private residence of Windsor Healthcare CEO Lee Samson in Beverly Hills, and had a private dinner at Trump National Golf Club in Rancho Palos Verdes.	President Trump meets with the staffs of U.S. Border Patrol
Nevada	Las Vegas	April 5–6	Following his time in California, President Trump flew to Las Vegas where he spent the night at Trump International Hotel Las Vegas. President Trump attended the Republican Jewish Coalition's annual leadership meeting, held at the Venetian, where he participated in a roundtable discussion and delivered remarks.	
Virginia	Sterling	April 7	President Trump traveled to Trump National Golf Club.	
Texas	San Antonio, Crosby, Houston	April 10	President Trump traveled to Texas for a pair of fundraising events. The first was held at The Argyle in San Antonio where he participated in a closed-door roundtable and fundraising lunch. The President then traveled to the International Union of Operating Engineers International Training and Education Center in Crosby, where he participated in an executive order-signing event related to expediting the approval for pipelines and other energy projects. Finally, President Trump held a second fundraising event at the Lone Star Flight Museum in Houston.	President Trump Delivers Remarks and Signs an Executive Order on Energy & Infrastructure
Virginia	Sterling	April 13	President Trump traveled to Trump National Golf Club.	
Minnesota	Burnsville	April 15	Arriving via Minneapolis–Saint Paul International Airport, President Trump attended a business round table discussion at Nuss Truck & Equipment in Burnsville. The occasion of the visit coincided with Tax Day, and Trump specifically touted the 2017 tax law at the event.	President Trump Holds a Roundtable on Tax Reform
Florida	Mar-a-Lago, West Palm Beach	April 18–21	President Trump traveled to his Mar-a-Lago resort to spend the Easter holiday. While there, President Trump played golf with professional golfer Lexi Thompson and radio talk show host Rush Limbaugh at the Trump International Golf Club.	President Trump at the Trump International Golf Club
Georgia	Atlanta	April 24	Arriving via Hartsfield–Jackson Atlanta International Airport, President Trump and First Lady Melania Trump attended the Rx Drug Abuse and Heroin Summit in Atlanta, where they spoke about the ongoing opioid crisis in America.	The Rx Drug Abuse and Heroin Summit
Indiana	Indianapolis	April 26	Arriving via Indianapolis International Airport, President Trump addressed a National Rifle Association convention at the Lucas Oil Stadium in Indianapolis.	President Trump Delivers Remarks at the NRA Annual Meeting
Virginia	Sterling	April 27	President Trump traveled to Trump National Golf Club to play golf with Japanese Prime Minister Shinzō Abe.	
Wisconsin	Green Bay	April 27	Arriving via Green Bay Austin Straubel International Airport, President Trump held a Make America Great Again Rally at the Resch Center in Green Bay.	

== May ==
Country/ U.S. state	Areas visited	Dates	Details	Image
Florida	Panama City Beach	May 8	Arriving via Tyndall Air Force Base, President Trump held a Make America Great Again Rally at the Aaron Bessant Park Amphitheater in Panama City Beach.	
Virginia	Sterling	May 11	President Trump traveled to Trump National Golf Club.	
Louisiana	Hackberry, Metairie	May 14	President Trump traveled to Hackberry to tour an export terminal which liquifies natural gas for storage and shipping, touting his "America First" energy policy. Afterwards, President Trump flew to Metairie, where he attended a fundraiser at a private residence and addressed supporters present.	President Trump Visits the Cameron LNG Export Facility
New York	New York City	May 16–17	President Trump traveled to Upper East Side, Manhattan for a fundraising campaign.	President Trump Arrives at the Wall Street Heliport
Virginia	Sterling	May 18	President Trump traveled to Trump National Golf Club.	
Virginia	Sterling	May 19	President Trump traveled to Trump National Golf Club.	
Pennsylvania	Montoursville	May 20	President Trump held a Make America Great Again Rally at the Williamsport Regional Airport in Montoursville.	Trump with supporters in Montoursville, 2019
Virginia	Arlington	May 24	President Trump traveled to Arlington National Cemetery for Memorial Day, where he participated in a wreath-laying ceremony at the Tomb of the Unknown Soldier.	President Donald J. Trump and First Lady Melania Trump Visit Arlington National Cemetery
Alaska	Anchorage	May 25	President Trump briefly visited U.S. service members at Joint Base Elmendorf–Richardson while on the state visit to Japan.	President Trump in Alaska
Japan	Tokyo, Yokosuka	May 25–28	President Trump and First Lady Melania Trump traveled to Tokyo, Japan, arriving via Haneda Airport on May 25. This was the first state visit by a sitting U.S. president to Japan since 1996. On May 26, President Trump first met with Prime Minister Shinzō Abe at Mobara Country Club in Chiba, where they played golf. President Trump and Prime Minister Abe also attended the sumo tournament at Ryōgoku Kokugikan Stadium. President Trump and Prime Minister Abe also dined together at the Inakaya restaurant in the Roppongi. President Trump and First Lady Melania Trump also met with Emperor Naruhito and Empress Masako at the Tokyo Imperial Palace where they attended a state dinner. On May 27, President Trump held a bilateral meeting and joint press conference with Prime Minister Abe at Akasaka Palace. On May 28, President Trump and Prime Minister Abe aboard the USS Wasp at Yokosuka Naval Base where President Trump addressed members of the USS Wasp.	President Trump and First Lady Melania Trump at the Imperial Palace
Colorado	Colorado Springs	May 30	Arriving via Peterson Air Force Base, President Trump delivered the Commencement Address at the United States Air Force Academy Graduation Ceremony.	The United States Air Force Academy Graduation Ceremony

== June ==
Country/ U.S. state	Areas visited	Dates	Details	Image
Virginia	Sterling, Vienna	June 2	President Trump traveled to Trump National Golf Club. President Trump traveled to Vienna to visit McLean Bible Church.	
United Kingdom	London, Portsmouth	June 3–5	President Trump and First Lady Melania Trump traveled the United Kingdom, arriving via Stansted Airport on June 3. This is the first state visit by a sitting U.S. president to the United Kingdom since 2011. President Trump and First Lady Melania Trump meet with Queen Elizabeth II, Prince Charles, and Duchess Camilla at Buckingham Palace where they received a ceremonial welcome, including a 41-gun salute. President Trump toured the palace and meet with senior royals. President Trump also laid a wreath on the Tomb of the Unknown Warrior in Westminster Abbey, accompanied by Prince Andrew. Prince Charles and Duchess Camilla hosted President Trump and First Lady Melania Trump for tea at the Clarence House. President Trump and First Lady Melania Trump attended a state banquet at Buckingham Palace hosted by Queen Elizabeth II before spending the night at Winfield House. On June 4, President Trump and Prime Minister Theresa May co-hosted a business breakfast meeting at St James's Palace, attended by Prince Andrew. President Trump held a bilateral meeting and joint press conference with Prime Minister May at 10 Downing Street. President Trump and First Lady Melania Trump also toured the Churchill War Rooms, accompanied by Prime Minister May. President Trump and First Lady Melania Trump hosted a black-tie dinner at Winfield House for Prime Minister May, Prince Charles and Duchess Camilla. On June 5, President Trump and First Lady Melania Trump attended the 75th anniversary of D-Day commemorative ceremonies in Portsmouth with Prime Minister May, Queen Elizabeth II, Prince Charles and Duchess Camilla. President Trump also held a bilateral meeting with German Chancellor Angela Merkel.	
Ireland	Shannon, County Clare	June 5–6	President Trump and First Lady Melania Trump traveled to Ireland, arriving via Shannon Airport on June 5. President Trump held a bilateral meeting with Taoiseach Leo Varadkar. President Trump and First Lady Melania Trump spent one night at his International golf resort in Doonbeg.	
France	Colleville, Caen	June 6	President Trump and First Lady Melania Trump traveled to France, arriving via Caen – Carpiquet Airport. President Trump attended the 75th anniversary of D-Day memorial ceremonies. President Trump visited the Normandy American Cemetery and Memorial. President Trump held a bilateral meeting with President Emmanuel Macron at the Prefecture of Calvados.	
Ireland	Shannon, County Clare	June 6–7	President Trump and First Lady Melania Trump returned to Ireland, arriving via Shannon Airport on June 6. President Trump and First Lady Melania Trump spent another night at his International golf resort in Doonbeg before returning to Washington on June 7.	
Virginia	Sterling	June 8	President Trump traveled to Trump National Golf Club.	
Virginia	Sterling	June 9	President Trump traveled to Trump National Golf Club.	
Iowa	Council Bluffs, West Des Moines	June 11	President Trump traveled to Council Bluffs to tour the Southwest Iowa Renewable Energy facility, where he announced his administration's decision to lift the ban on gasoline mixed with 15% ethanol. Afterwards, President Trump attended a fundraiser for the Republican Party of Iowa in West Des Moines, where he addressed a crowd of around 700 supporters.	
Virginia	Sterling	June 15	President Trump traveled to Trump National Golf Club.	
Virginia	Sterling	June 16	President Trump traveled to Trump National Golf Club.	
Florida	Orlando, Doral	June 18–19	Arriving via Orlando International Airport on June 18, President Trump held a Keep America Great Rally at the Amway Center in Orlando where he formally announced his 2020 re-election campaign. The President was joined by First Lady Melania Trump and Vice President Mike Pence. The president and first lady then traveled to Doral, Florida, where they spent the night at Trump National Doral Miami. On June 19, the president held a morning meeting with supporters followed by a luncheon fundraiser before returning to Washington.	
Alaska	Anchorage	June 26	President Trump briefly visited U.S. service members at Joint Base Elmendorf–Richardson.	
Japan	Osaka	June 27–29	Arriving via Osaka International Airport on June 27, President Trump held a bilateral meeting and dinner with Australian prime minister Scott Morrison. On June 28, President Trump attended the G20 summit. President Trump also held bilateral meetings with Brazilian president Jair Bolsonaro, German chancellor Angela Merkel, Indian prime minister Narendra Modi, Japanese prime minister Shinzō Abe, and Russian president Vladimir Putin. On June 29, President Trump held bilateral meetings with Chinese president Xi Jinping and Turkish president Recep Tayyip Erdoğan.	
South Korea	Seoul, Korean Demilitarized Zone, Osan	June 29–30	Arriving via Osan Air Base on June 29, President Trump attended a dinner hosted by President Moon Jae-in and First Lady Kim Jung-sook. On June 30, President Trump held a bilateral meeting and joint press conference with President Moon at the Blue House. President Trump then visited the Korean Demilitarized Zone, accompanied by President Moon. President Trump also met with North Korean leader Kim Jong Un at the Military Demarcation Line and briefly walked into the northern side of the Joint Security Area of the Korean Demilitarized Zone, becoming the first sitting U.S. president to enter North Korea. After entering North Korea, President Trump walked back to the southern side of the Joint Security Area of the Korean Demilitarized Zone. President Trump attended the DMZ summit meeting and held a bilateral meeting with North Korean leader Kim Jong-un at the Inter-Korean Freedom House on the southern side of the Joint Security Area of the Korean Demilitarized Zone. President Trump then returned to Osan Air Base, where he addressed U.S. troops.	

== July ==
Country/ U.S. state	Areas visited	Dates	Details	Image
Virginia	Sterling	July 4	President Trump traveled to Trump National Golf Club.	
New Jersey	Bedminster	July 5–7	President Trump traveled to Trump National Golf Club in Bedminster, New Jersey.	
Wisconsin	Milwaukee	July 12	Arriving via General Mitchell International Airport, President Trump traveled to Milwaukee to tour Derco Aerospace and give remarks on the United States–Mexico–Canada Agreement. Trump also attended a fundraiser on behalf of the Republican National Committee.	
Ohio	Cleveland	July 12	Arriving via Cleveland Hopkins International Airport, President Trump traveled to Cleveland to attend a fundraiser in Hunting Valley, Ohio.	
Virginia	Sterling	July 13	President Trump traveled to Trump National Golf Club.	
Virginia	Sterling	July 14	President Trump traveled to Trump National Golf Club.	
North Carolina	Greenville	July 17	Arriving via Pitt–Greenville Airport, President Trump held a Keep America Great Rally at the Williams Arena in Greenville.	
New Jersey	Bedminster	July 19–21	President Trump hosted a fundraiser at the Trump National Golf Club in Bedminster, New Jersey.	
West Virginia	Wheeling	July 24	Arriving via Wheeling Ohio County Airport, President Trump attended a fundraiser at the WesBanco Arena in Wheeling.	
Virginia	Arlington	July 25	President Trump traveled to the Pentagon to attend a welcome ceremony for newly confirmed secretary of defense Mark Esper.	
Virginia	Sterling	July 27	President Trump traveled to Trump National Golf Club.	
Virginia	Sterling	July 28	President Trump traveled to Trump National Golf Club.	
Virginia	Jamestown	July 30	President Trump visited the historic Jamestown Settlement, where he addressed a joint session of the Virginia General Assembly as part of a commemorative event celebrating the 400th anniversary of representative democracy in America.	

== August ==
Country/ U.S. state	Areas visited	Dates	Details	Image
Ohio	Cincinnati	August 1	Arriving via Cincinnati/Northern Kentucky International Airport, President Trump held a Keep America Great Rally at the U.S. Bank Arena in Cincinnati.	
New Jersey	Bedminster	August 2–4	President Trump traveled to Trump National Golf Club in Bedminster, New Jersey.	
Ohio	Dayton	August 7	Arriving via Wright-Patterson Air Force Base, President Trump and First Lady Melania Trump traveled to Miami Valley Hospital in Dayton following the mass shooting which occurred on August 4 and claimed the lives of ten people, including the perpetrator.	
Texas	El Paso	August 7	Arriving via El Paso International Airport, President Trump and First Lady Melania Trump traveled to University Medical Center in El Paso following the mass shooting which occurred on August 3 and claimed the lives of twenty-three people.	
New York	Southampton, Bridgehampton	August 9	Arriving via Francis S. Gabreski Airport, President Trump traveled to Southampton to attend a campaign fundraiser at the private residence of real estate developer Stephen Ross, where he participated in a luncheon and a roundtable discussion. President Trump then traveled to Bridgehampton to attend a separate campaign fundraiser at the private residence of real estate developer Joe Farrell.	
New Jersey	Bedminster	August 9–13	President Trump traveled to Trump National Golf Club in Bedminster, New Jersey.	
Pennsylvania	Monaca	August 13	Arriving via Pittsburgh International Airport, President Trump traveled to Monaca to tour the Shell Pennsylvania Petrochemicals Complex, as well as deliver remarks.	
New Jersey	Bedminster	August 13–15	President Trump returned to Trump National Golf Club in Bedminster, New Jersey from Pennsylvania.	
New Hampshire	Manchester	August 15	Arriving via Manchester–Boston Regional Airport, President Trump held a Keep America Great Rally at the SNHU Arena in Manchester.	
New Jersey	Bedminster	August 15–18	President Trump returned to Trump National Golf Club in Bedminster, New Jersey from New Hampshire.	
Kentucky	Louisville	August 21	President Trump traveled to Louisville, where he addressed the AMVETS 75th Annual National Convention at the Galt House. President Trump also headlined a private fundraiser in support of Governor Matt Bevin.	
France	Biarritz	August 24–26	Arriving via Bordeaux–Mérignac Airport, President Trump and First Lady Melania Trump traveled from there on board a Boeing C-32 to Biarritz Pays Basque Airport in Biarritz, Nouvelle-Aquitaine, to attend the 45th G7 summit at the Hôtel du Palais. On August 25, President Trump held a bilateral meeting with French president Emmanuel Macron. President Trump also held bilateral meetings with Australian Prime Minister Scott Morrison, British Prime Minister Boris Johnson, Canadian Prime Minister Justin Trudeau and Japanese Prime Minister Shinzō Abe. On August 26, President Trump also held bilateral meetings with Egyptian President Abdel Fattah el-Sisi, German Chancellor Angela Merkel and Indian Prime Minister Narendra Modi. President Trump also held a joint press conference with French president Emmanuel Macron.	
Virginia	Sterling	August 31	President Trump traveled to Trump National Golf Club.	

== September ==
Country/ U.S. state	Areas visited	Dates	Details	Image
Virginia	Sterling	September 2	President Trump traveled to Trump National Golf Club.	
Virginia	Sterling	September 7	President Trump traveled to Trump National Golf Club.	
Virginia	Sterling	September 8	President Trump traveled to Trump National Golf Club.	
North Carolina	MCAS Cherry Point, Havelock, Fayetteville	September 9	President Trump visited MCAS Cherry Point in Havelock, where he held a meeting on Air Force One with North Carolina governor Roy Cooper as well as other emergency management officials to receive a briefing about the impact of Hurricane Dorian. Afterwards, he held a Keep America Great Rally at the Crown Expo Center in Fayetteville in support of congressional candidate Dan Bishop.	
Virginia	Arlington	September 11	President Trump and First Lady Melania Trump participated in a memorial ceremony at the Pentagon Memorial in Arlington County, Virginia, where he spoke on the eighteenth anniversary of the September 11 attacks.	
Maryland	Baltimore	September 12	President Trump traveled to Baltimore, where he addressed House Republicans at their annual retreat held at the Marriott Waterfront Hotel.	
Virginia	Sterling	September 14	President Trump traveled to Trump National Golf Club.	
Virginia	Sterling	September 15	President Trump traveled to Trump National Golf Club.	
New Mexico	Rio Rancho	September 16–17	Arriving via Albuquerque International Sunport, President Trump held a Keep America Great Rally at the Santa Ana Star Center in Rio Rancho.	
California	Palo Alto, Beverly Hills, San Diego	September 17–18	President Trump traveled to Palo Alto to attend a fundraising luncheon for the RNC. On September 18, President Trump attended separate fundraisers in Beverly Hills and San Diego. In addition to the fundraising events, President Trump visited a section renovated border wall near Otay Mesa.	
Virginia	Sterling	September 21	President Trump traveled to Trump National Golf Club.	
Texas	Houston	September 22	President Trump traveled to Houston to attend a rally being held by Indian prime minister Narendra Modi at NRG Stadium.	
Ohio	Wapakoneta	September 22	President Trump traveled to Wapakoneta, where he toured an Australian-owned paper recycling plant with Australian prime minister Scott Morrison.	
New York	New York City	September 22–26	President Trump traveled to New York City to attend the United Nations summit, arriving at Trump Tower on September 22. On September 23, President Trump attended the United Nations event on 'Religious Freedom' at the Headquarters of the United Nations. President Trump subsequently held bilateral meetings with Pakistani president Imran Khan, Polish president Andrzej Duda, New Zealand prime minister Jacinda Ardern, Singaporean prime minister Lee Hsien Loong, Egyptian president Abdel Fattah el-Sisi, and South Korean president Moon Jae-in at the Lotte New York Palace. On September 24, President Trump addressed the United Nations General Assembly at the Headquarters of the United Nations. President Trump subsequently held bilateral meetings with British prime minister Boris Johnson, Iraqi president Barham Salih and Indian prime minister Narendra Modi at the Lotte New York Palace. On September 25, President Trump held bilateral meetings with Japanese prime minister Shinzō Abe, Ukrainian president Volodymyr Zelenskyy, and Salvadorans president Nayib Bukele at the Lotte New York Palace. On September 26, President Trump visited the United States Mission to the United Nations.	
Virginia	Sterling	September 28	President Trump traveled to Trump National Golf Club, where he golfed with South Carolina senator Lindsey Graham and World Golf Hall of Famers Gary Player and Annika Sörenstam.	
Virginia	Sterling	September 29	President Trump traveled to Trump National Golf Club.	
Virginia	Joint Base Myer–Henderson Hall	September 30	President Trump traveled to Joint Base Myer–Henderson Hall to attend a welcome ceremony for newly confirmed Chairman of the Joint Chiefs of Staff Mark Milley.	

== October ==
Country/ U.S. state	Areas visited	Dates	Details	Image
Florida	The Villages	October 3	Arriving via Ocala International Airport, President Trump traveled to The Villages to attend an event at the Sharon L. Morse Performing Arts Center, where he signed an executive order which is related to Medicare.	
Maryland	Bethesda	October 4	President Trump traveled to Walter Reed National Military Medical Center in Bethesda, Maryland.	
Virginia	Sterling	October 5	President Trump traveled to Trump National Golf Club.	
Minnesota	Minneapolis	October 10	Arriving via Minneapolis–Saint Paul International Airport, President Trump held a Keep America Great Rally at the Target Center in Minneapolis.	
Louisiana	Lake Charles	October 11	Arriving via Chennault International Airport, President Trump held a Keep America Great Rally at the James E. Sudduth Coliseum in Lake Charles in support of Republican gubernatorial candidates Ralph Abraham and Eddie Rispone.	
Virginia	Sterling	October 12	President Trump traveled to Trump National Golf Club, where he had lunch with Rudy Giuliani.	
Virginia	Sterling	October 13	President Trump traveled to Trump National Golf Club, where he played golf with Tom Watson.	
Texas	Fort Worth, Keene, Dallas	October 17	Arriving via Naval Air Station Joint Reserve Base Fort Worth, President Trump attended a fundraising luncheon in Fort Worth. President Trump then traveled to the site of the Louis Vuitton Rochambeau Ranch in Keene, where he attended a ribbon cutting ceremony. Afterwards, President Trump held a Keep America Great Rally at the American Airlines Center in Dallas.	
Pennsylvania	Pittsburgh	October 23	Arriving via Pittsburgh International Airport, President Trump addressed the Shale Insight Conference at the David L. Lawrence Convention Center in Pittsburgh.	
South Carolina	Columbia	October 25	Arriving via Columbia Metropolitan Airport, President Trump participated in a forum on criminal justice reform sponsored by the 20/20 Bipartisan Justice Center at Benedict College's Little Theater in Columbia.	
Virginia	Sterling	October 26	Departing from Camp David, President Trump traveled to Trump National Golf Club.	
Illinois	Chicago	October 28	Arriving via O'Hare International Airport, President Trump attended a fundraiser at the Trump International Hotel and Tower in Chicago, which was hosted by Chicago Cubs co-owner Todd Ricketts and RNC chair Ronna Romney McDaniel.	

== November ==
Country/ U.S. state	Areas visited	Dates	Details	Image
Mississippi	Tupelo	November 1	Arriving via Tupelo Regional Airport, President Trump held a Keep America Great Rally at the BancorpSouth Arena in Tupelo in support of Republican gubernatorial candidate Tate Reeves.	
New York	New York City	November 2–3	President Trump traveled to New York City, where he attended UFC 244 held at Madison Square Garden.	President Trump Departs NYC (49013991162)
Kentucky	Lexington	November 4	Arriving via Blue Grass Airport, President Trump held a Keep America Great Rally at the Rupp Arena in Lexington in support of Republican governor Matt Bevin.	
Louisiana	Monroe	November 6	Arriving via Monroe Regional Airport, President Trump held a Keep America Great Rally at the Monroe Civic Center in Monroe in support of Republican gubernatorial candidate Eddie Rispone.	
Georgia	Atlanta	November 8	Arriving via Dobbins Air Reserve Base, President Trump traveled to Atlanta, where he headlined a fundraiser in support of U.S. Senator David Perdue. Afterwards, President Trump attended the launch of the Black Voice For Trump coalition in association with his re-election campaign.	President Trump Arrives in Georgia (49048626613)
Alabama	Tuscaloosa	November 9	President Trump traveled to Tuscaloosa, where he attended the University of Alabama football home game against Louisiana State University held at Bryant-Denny Stadium.	President Trump and First Lady Melania Trump in Alabama (49049200606)
New York	New York City	November 9–12	President Trump traveled to New York City, arriving at Trump Tower on November 9. On November 11, President Trump and First Lady Melania Trump participated in the Veterans Day parade at Madison Square Park.	
Louisiana	Bossier City	November 14	Arriving via Barksdale Air Force Base, President Trump held a Keep America Great Rally at the CenturyLink Center in Bossier City in support of Republican gubernatorial candidate Eddie Rispone.	
Maryland	Bethesda	November 16	President Trump visited Walter Reed National Military Medical Center in Bethesda, Maryland, where he underwent part of his annual physical examination for 2020. Afterwards, President Trump visited with the family of a special forces soldier who had been injured in Afghanistan.	
Texas	Austin	November 20	Arriving via Austin–Bergstrom International Airport, President Trump traveled to Austin, where he toured the Apple Manufacturing Plant at the Flextronics International, LTD. – Austin Product Introduction Center with Apple CEO Tim Cook.	
Delaware	Dover	November 21	President Trump attended a ceremony at Dover Air Force Base to honor the two Americans who were killed in a helicopter crash in Afghanistan.	
Florida	Sunrise, Mar-a-Lago, Palm Beach	November 26–28	Arriving via Palm Beach International Airport, President Trump held a Keep America Great Rally at the BB&T Center in Sunrise. Afterwards, President Trump traveled to West Palm Beach for the Thanksgiving Holiday. On November 27, President Trump visited Trump International Golf Club to play a round of golf.	
Afghanistan	Bagram Airfield	November 28	President Trump and First Lady Melania Trump made an unannounced Thanksgiving visit in order to meet with American troops at Bagram Airfield in Afghanistan. President Trump also held a bilateral meeting with Afghan president Ashraf Ghani and announced his administration's intention to negotiate for a ceasefire with the Taliban.	
Florida	Mar-a-Lago, Palm Beach	November 29–December 1	Arriving via Palm Beach International Airport, President Trump returned to West Palm Beach to continue the Thanksgiving Holiday following his unannounced visit in Afghanistan.	

== December ==
Country/ U.S. state	Areas visited	Dates	Details	Image
United Kingdom	London, Watford	December 2–4	President Trump and First Lady Melania Trump traveled the United Kingdom, arriving via Stansted Airport on December 2. On December 3, President Trump attended the 30th NATO summit. President Trump held bilateral meetings with NATO secretary general Jens Stoltenberg, French president Emmanuel Macron and Canadian prime minister Justin Trudeau. The Prince of Wales and the Duchess of Cornwall hosted President Trump and First Lady Melania Trump for tea at Clarence House. President Trump attended NATO dinner hosted by Queen Elizabeth II at Buckingham Palace. President Trump also attended NATO dinner hosted by Prime Minister Boris Johnson at 10 Downing Street. On December 4, President Trump held bilateral meetings with German chancellor Angela Merkel, Danish prime minister Mette Frederiksen and Italian prime minister Giuseppe Conte.	
Florida	Hollywood, Aventura	December 7	Arriving via Fort Lauderdale–Hollywood International Airport, President Trump traveled to Hollywood to address the Israeli American Council National Summit. Afterwards, he attended the Florida Republican Party's annual Statesman's Dinner in Aventura, where he addressed a crowd of approximately 1,000 attendees as part of a private fundraising event.	
Pennsylvania	Hershey	December 10	Arriving via Harrisburg International Airport, President Trump held a Keep America Great Rally at the Giant Center in Hershey.	
Pennsylvania	Philadelphia	December 14	Arriving via Philadelphia International Airport, President Trump attended the 120th Army–Navy Game to handle coin toss at the Lincoln Financial Field.	
Michigan	Battle Creek	December 18	Arriving via W. K. Kellogg Airport, President Trump held a Keep America Great Rally at the Kellogg Arena in Battle Creek.	
Florida	Mar-a-Lago, West Palm Beach	December 20–31	Arriving via Palm Beach International Airport, President Trump and First Lady Melania Trump traveled to West Palm Beach, where they spend their Christmas Holiday at his resort in Mar-a-Lago. On December 22, President Trump traveled to the Trump International Golf Club in West Palm Beach. On December 24, President Trump attended a Christmas service at Bethesda-by-the-Sea. From December 26–31, President Trump traveled again to the Trump International Golf Club.	

== See also ==
- List of international presidential trips made by Donald Trump
- List of Donald Trump rallies (December 2016–2022)
- Lists of presidential trips made by Donald Trump
