= Trump National Golf Club =

Trump National Golf Club may refer to:

- Trump National Golf Club (Bedminster, New Jersey)
- Trump National Golf Club (Colts Neck, New Jersey)
- Trump National Golf Club Hudson Valley (Hopewell Junction, New York)
- Trump National Golf Club (Jupiter, Florida)
- Trump National Golf Club (Los Angeles)
- Trump National Golf Club (Philadelphia)
- Trump National Golf Club Washington, D.C. in Virginia
- Trump National Golf Club (Westchester, New York)

== See also ==
- List of things named after Donald Trump
