= List of presidential trips made by Donald Trump (2025) =

This is a list of presidential trips made by President Donald J Trump during 2025, the first year of his second presidency as the 47th president of the United States.

This list excludes trips made within Washington, D.C., the U.S. federal capital in which the White House, the official residence and principal workplace of the president, is located. Also excluded are trips to Camp David, the country residence of the president, as well as Joint Base Andrews. International trips are included. Here are the number of visits per state or territory he traveled to:

- One: Alabama, Arizona, California, Delaware, Iowa, Louisiana, Michigan, Nevada and Texas
- Two: Alaska
- Three: North Carolina
- Four: Pennsylvania
- Five: Maryland and New York
- Ten: New Jersey
- Nineteen: Florida
- Thirty-four: Virginia

International

- 8 trips, 13 countries

Locations in the contiguous United States that President Donald Trump has visited in 2025.

January (blue) – February (yellow) – March (brown) – April (pink) – May (grey) – June (orange) – July (purple) – August (light blue) – September (magenta) – October (green) – November (red) – December (light green)

Locations in Alaska that President Donald Trump has visited.

Map of domestic trips made by Donald Trump in 2025 Washington, D.C. 7 or more visits 6 visits 5 visits 4 visits 3 visits 2 visits 1 visit No visits

== January ==
Country/ U.S. state	Areas visited	Dates	Details	Image
North Carolina	Swannanoa	January 24	Arriving via Asheville Regional Airport, President Trump and First Lady Melania Trump visited and surveyed the damage from Hurricane Helene.	
California	Pacific Palisades	January 24	Arriving via Los Angeles International Airport, President Trump and First Lady Melania Trump toured the neighborhood affected by the Southern California wildfires.	
Nevada	Las Vegas	January 24–25	Arriving via Harry Reid International Airport, President Trump spent the night at the Trump International Hotel Las Vegas. On January 25, President Trump delivered remarks on tips and taxes rally event at Circa Resort & Casino.	
Florida	Doral	January 25–27	Arriving via Miami International Airport, President Trump visited Trump National Doral Miami for the weekend, where he attended the annual House GOP retreat.	
Florida	Mar-a-Lago	January 31	Arriving via Palm Beach International Airport, President Trump visited Mar-a-Lago for the weekend.	

== February ==
Country/ U.S. state	Areas visited	Dates	Details	Image
Florida	Mar-a-Lago, West Palm Beach	February 1–2	President Trump continued his weekend at Mar-a-Lago. On Saturday and Sunday, he played golf at Trump International Golf Club before returning to the White House Sunday evening.	
Florida	Mar-a-Lago, West Palm Beach	February 7–9	Arriving via Palm Beach International Airport, President Trump visited Mar-a-Lago for the weekend. On Saturday, he played golf at Trump International Golf Club. He was then interviewed by Bret Baier of Fox News, which aired on Sunday as part of Fox Sports' pre-game coverage of Super Bowl LIX. On Sunday, he played golf again at Trump International Golf Club with Tiger Woods.	
Louisiana	New Orleans	February 9	Arriving via Naval Air Station Joint Reserve Base New Orleans, President Trump attended Super Bowl LIX at the Caesars Superdome.	
Florida	Mar-a-Lago, West Palm Beach, Daytona Beach, Doral, Miami Beach	February 14–19	Arriving via Palm Beach International Airport, President Trump visited Mar-a-Lago for Presidents' Day weekend. On Saturday, he visited Palm Beach International Airport and toured Boeing's Air Force One replacement. He then played golf at Trump International Golf Club. On Sunday, President Trump flew to Daytona Beach International Airport and attended the Daytona 500 at Daytona International Speedway. He then returned to Mar-a-Lago for the remainder of Presidents' Day weekend. On Monday and Tuesday, he golfed again at Trump International Golf Club. On Wednesday, he flew to Miami International Airport and visited briefly at Trump National Doral Miami. He then participated in FII Priority Summit at the Faena Forum.	
Maryland	National Harbor	February 22	President Trump delivered remarks at the Conservative Political Action Conference at the Gaylord National Resort & Convention Center.	
Florida	Mar-a-Lago	February 28	Arriving via Palm Beach International Airport, President Trump visited Mar-a-Lago for the weekend.	

== March ==
Country/ U.S. state	Areas visited	Dates	Details	Image
Florida	Mar-a-Lago, West Palm Beach	March 1–2	President Trump continued his weekend at Mar-a-Lago. On Saturday, he played golf at Trump International Golf Club. He then hosted the MAGA Inc. Candlelight Finance Dinner at Mar-a-Lago. On Sunday, he played golf at Trump International Golf Club.	
Florida	Mar-a-Lago, West Palm Beach	March 7–9	Arriving via Palm Beach International Airport, President Trump visited Mar-a-Lago for the weekend. On Saturday and Sunday, he played golf at Trump International Golf Club.	
Florida	Mar-a-Lago, West Palm Beach	March 14–16	Arriving via Palm Beach International Airport, President Trump visited Mar-a-Lago for the weekend. On Saturday and Sunday, he played golf at Trump International Golf Club.	
New Jersey	Bedminster	March 21–22	Arriving via Morristown Municipal Airport and flying to Bedminster on Marine One, President Trump visited Trump National Golf Club for the weekend.	
Pennsylvania	Philadelphia	March 22	Arriving via Philadelphia International Airport, President Trump attended the 2025 NCAA Division I Men's Wrestling Championships at Wells Fargo Center.	
Florida	Mar-a-Lago, West Palm Beach	March 28–30	Arriving via Palm Beach International Airport, President Trump visited Mar-a-Lago for the weekend. On Saturday, he played golf at Trump International Golf Club with Finnish President Alexander Stubb. On Sunday, he played golf again at Trump International Golf Club.	

== April ==
Country/ U.S. state	Areas visited	Dates	Details	Image
Florida	Doral, Mar-a-Lago, West Palm Beach, Jupiter	April 3–6	Arriving via Miami International Airport, President Trump attended the LIV Golf League at Trump National Doral Miami on Thursday. He then flew to Palm Beach International Airport and visited Mar-a-Lago for the weekend. On Friday, he played golf at Trump International Golf Club. On Saturday and Sunday, he again played golf at Trump National Golf Club Jupiter.	
Maryland	Bethesda	April 11	President Trump traveled to the METU Suite of Walter Reed National Military Medical Center in Bethesda, Maryland, for his annual physical examination.	
Florida	Mar-a-Lago, West Palm Beach, Miami	April 11–13	Arriving via Palm Beach International Airport, President Trump visited Mar-a-Lago for the weekend. On Saturday, he played golf at Trump International Golf Club. He then flew to Miami International Airport and attended UFC 314 at the Kaseya Center. On Sunday, he played golf again at Trump International Golf Club.	
Virginia	Sterling	April 19	President Trump played golf at Trump National Golf Club.	
Virginia	Sterling	April 20	President Trump played golf at Trump National Golf Club.	
Virginia	Sterling	April 24	Arriving via Leesburg Executive Airport on Marine One, President Trump participated in the MAGA Inc. dinner at Trump National Golf Club.	
Italy	Rome	April 25	Arriving via Rome Fiumicino Airport for the funeral of Pope Francis, President Trump and First Lady Melania Trump spent the night at Villa Taverna, the residence of the U.S. ambassador to Italy.	
Vatican City		April 26	President Trump and First Lady Melania Trump attended the funeral of Pope Francis at St. Peter's Square.	
New Jersey	Bedminster	April 26–27	Arriving via Newark Liberty International Airport and flying to Bedminster on Marine One, President Trump and First Lady Melania Trump visited Trump National Golf Club Bedminster for the remainder of the weekend.	
Michigan	Warren	April 29	Arriving via Selfridge Air National Guard Base, President Trump spoke to members of the Michigan Air National Guard alongside Secretary of Defense Pete Hegseth, Michigan Governor Gretchen Whitmer. President Trump then held a rally at Macomb Community College to mark the first 100 days of his second administration.	

== May ==
Country/ U.S. state	Areas visited	Dates	Details	Image
Alabama	Tuscaloosa	May 1	Arriving via Tuscaloosa National Airport, President Trump delivered the commencement address at the University of Alabama at Coleman Coliseum.	
Florida	Mar-a-Lago, West Palm Beach	May 1–4	Arriving via Palm Beach International Airport, President Trump visited Mar-a-Lago for the weekend. He attended a fundraiser event for Florida 2026 gubernatorial candidate Byron Donalds alongside Vice President JD Vance. On Friday, he played golf at Trump International Golf Club. He then hosted the RNC Spring Gala at Mar-a-Lago. On Saturday and Sunday, he played golf again at Trump International Golf Club.	
Virginia	Sterling	May 5	President Trump participated in the MAGA Inc. dinner at Trump National Golf Club.	
Virginia	Sterling	May 10	President Trump played golf at Trump National Golf Club.	
Saudi Arabia	Riyadh	May 13–14	Main article: May 2025 visit by Donald Trump to the Middle East Arriving via King Khalid International Airport, President Trump met with Crown Prince Mohammed bin Salman and King Salman. He visited the Royal Court Palace. He participated in a Saudi-U.S. Investment Forum at The King Abdulaziz Conference Center. He also visited At-Turaif World Heritage Site for Saudi State dinner. He spent the night at the Ritz-Carlton. On May 14, President Trump attended the GCC Summit. He also met with Syrian president Ahmed al-Sharaa, becoming the first sitting U.S. president to meet with a Syrian head of state since 2000. Trump made a refueling stop at RAF Mildenhall in the United Kingdom enroute to Saudi Arabia.	
Qatar	Doha	May 14–15	Arriving via Hamad International Airport, President Trump met with Emir Tamim bin Hamad Al Thani at the Amiri Diwan. He visited Lusail Palace for Qatari State dinner. He then spent the night at the St. Regis Doha. On May 15, President Trump participated in a Roundtable with Business Leaders. He delivered remarks with troops at Al Udeid Air Base.	
United Arab Emirates	Abu Dhabi	May 15–16	Arriving via Abu Dhabi International Airport, President Trump visited the Sheikh Zayed Grand Mosque. He met with President Mohamed bin Zayed Al Nahyan at Qasr Al Watan. He spent the night at the Ritz-Carlton Abu Dhabi. On May 16, President Trump attended a U.S.-UAE Business Breakfast Roundtable. He then visited the Abrahamic Family House. Trump made a refueling stop at RAF Mildenhall in the United Kingdom enroute back to the United States.	
Virginia	Sterling	May 18	President Trump played golf at Trump National Golf Club.	
Virginia	Sterling	May 22	President Trump participated in a dinner at Trump National Golf Club with the top holders of the $Trump meme coin.	
New Jersey	Bedminster	May 23–24	Arriving via Morristown Municipal Airport, President Trump visited Trump National Golf Club for Memorial Day weekend.	
New York	West Point	May 24	Arriving via West Point Landing Zone on Marine One, President Trump delivered the commencement address at Michie Stadium on the campus of the United States Military Academy.	
New Jersey	Bedminster	May 24–25	President Trump returned to Bedminster and visited Trump National Golf Club for the remainder of Memorial Day weekend.	
Virginia	Arlington, Sterling	May 26	President Trump traveled to Arlington National Cemetery for Memorial Day, where he participated in a wreath-laying ceremony at the Tomb of the Unknown Soldier and delivered the Memorial Day address at Memorial Amphitheater. He then played golf at Trump National Golf Club.	
Pennsylvania	West Mifflin	May 30	Arriving via Allegheny County Airport, President Trump held a rally at the Mon Valley Works–Irvin Plant.	
Virginia	Sterling	May 31	President Trump played golf at Trump National Golf Club.	

== June ==
Country/ U.S. state	Areas visited	Dates	Details	Image
Virginia	Sterling	June 1	President Trump played golf at Trump National Golf Club.	
New Jersey	Bedminster, Newark	June 6–8	Arriving via Morristown Municipal Airport, President Trump visited Trump National Golf Club for the weekend. On Saturday, President Trump attended UFC 316 at the Prudential Center. On Sunday, he traveled to Camp David for the remainder of the weekend, returning to the White House on Monday.	
North Carolina	Fort Bragg	June 10	President Trump delivered remarks in honor on the 250th anniversary of the United States Army at Pike Field.	
Canada	Calgary, Kananaskis	June 15–16	Arriving via Calgary International Airport, President Trump spent the night in Calgary. On June 16, President Trump attended the 51st G7 summit. He held bilateral meetings with Prime Minister Mark Carney, German Chancellor Friedrich Merz and British Prime Minister Keir Starmer, where he signed an executive order to implement the UK–U.S. Trade Deal reducing tariffs between the two countries. President Trump unexpectedly returned to Washington a day early due to the Twelve-Day War.	
New Jersey	Bedminster	June 20–21	Arriving via Morristown Municipal Airport, President Trump visited Trump National Golf Club for the weekend. He participated in the MAGA Inc. dinner. President Trump returned to the White House early to supervise the airstrikes on Iran's nuclear infrastructure from the Situation Room.	
Netherlands	The Hague	June 24–25	Arriving via Amsterdam Airport Schiphol, President Trump met with King Willem-Alexander and Queen Máxima at Huis ten Bosch. On June 25, President Trump attended the 35th NATO summit at the World Forum. He held bilateral meetings with Prime Minister Dick Schoof and NATO Secretary General Mark Rutte.	
Virginia	Sterling	June 28	President Trump played golf at Trump National Golf Club.	
Virginia	Sterling	June 29	President Trump played golf at Trump National Golf Club.	

== July ==
Country/ U.S. state	Areas visited	Dates	Details	Image
Florida	Collier County	July 1	Arriving via the Dade-Collier Training and Transition Airport, President Trump visited the newly opened Alligator Alcatraz migrant detention facility.	
Iowa	Des Moines	July 3	Arriving via Des Moines International Airport, President Trump delivered remarks at the Iowa State Fairgrounds.	
New Jersey	Bedminster	July 4–6	Arriving via Morristown Municipal Airport, President Trump and First Lady Melania Trump visited Trump National Golf Club for Independence Day weekend.	
Texas	Kerrville	July 11	Arriving via Kelly Field and flying to Kerrville Municipal Airport on Marine One, President Trump and First Lady Melania Trump visited Central Texas to survey the damage and recovery efforts from the Central Texas floods.	
New Jersey	Bedminster, East Rutherford	July 11–13	Arriving via Newark Airport, President Trump visited Trump National Golf Club for the weekend. On Sunday, arriving via Teterboro Airport on Marine One, President Trump and the First Lady attended the FIFA Club World Cup final at MetLife Stadium.	
Pennsylvania	Pittsburgh	July 15	Arriving via Pittsburgh International Airport, President Trump attended the inaugural Pennsylvania Energy and Innovation Summit at Carnegie Mellon University.	
Virginia	Sterling	July 19	President Trump played golf at Trump National Golf Club.	
Virginia	Sterling	July 20	President Trump played golf at Trump National Golf Club.	
United Kingdom	Aberdeenshire, Turnberry	July 25–29	Arriving via Glasgow Prestwick Airport, President Trump made a private trip in Scotland and visited his golf course in Aberdeenshire as well as his property in Turnberry. He met with European Commission president Ursula von der Leyen and successfully reached a trade deal with the European Union. He also met with Prime Minister Keir Starmer to finalize a trade agreement between the United States and the United Kingdom.	

== August ==
Country/ U.S. state	Areas visited	Dates	Details	Image
New Jersey	Bedminster	August 1–3	Arriving via Lehigh Valley International Airport and flying to Bedminster on Marine One, President Trump visited Trump National Golf Club for the weekend.	
Virginia	Sterling	August 9	President Trump played golf at Trump National Golf Club.	
Virginia	Sterling	August 10	President Trump played golf at Trump National Golf Club.	
Alaska	Anchorage	August 15–16	Arriving via Anchorage International Airport, President Trump held a summit with Russian President Vladimir Putin at Joint Base Elmendorf–Richardson.	
Virginia	Sterling	August 16	President Trump played golf at Trump National Golf Club.	
Virginia	Sterling	August 17	President Trump played golf at Trump National Golf Club.	
Virginia	Sterling	August 23	President Trump played golf at Trump National Golf Club.	
Virginia	Sterling	August 24	President Trump played golf at Trump National Golf Club.	
Virginia	Sterling	August 30	President Trump played golf at Trump National Golf Club.	
Virginia	Sterling	August 31	President Trump played golf at Trump National Golf Club.	

== September ==
Country/ U.S. state	Areas visited	Dates	Details	Image
Virginia	Sterling	September 1	President Trump played golf at Trump National Golf Club.	
Virginia	Sterling	September 6	President Trump played golf at Trump National Golf Club.	
New York	Queens	September 7	Arriving via LaGuardia Airport, President Trump attended the US Open men's final at Arthur Ashe Stadium.	
Virginia	Arlington	September 11	President Trump and First Lady Melania Trump attended the September 11th Observance Event at the Pentagon Memorial to mark the 24th anniversary of the September 11 attacks.	
New York	Bronx, New York City	September 11–12	Arriving via LaGuardia Airport, President Trump attended the New York Yankees vs Detroit Tigers game at Yankee Stadium. He spent the night at Trump Tower. On September 12, President Trump appeared in a live interview in the studio of Fox & Friends on Fox News. He then flew to Bedminster from the Downtown Manhattan Heliport on Marine One.	
New Jersey	Bedminster	September 12–14	Arriving in Bedminster on Marine One, President Trump visited Trump National Golf Club for the weekend.	
United Kingdom	Windsor, London, Chequers	September 16–18	Main article: 2025 state visit by Donald Trump to the United Kingdom Arriving via Stansted Airport, President Trump and First Lady Melania Trump spent the night at Winfield House. This is the first state visit by a sitting U.S. president to the United Kingdom since 2019. On September 17, President Trump and First Lady Melania Trump met with King Charles III, Queen Camilla, Prince William and Princess Catherine at Windsor Castle. They partictipated in a wrealth laying ceremony at the tomb of Queen Elizabeth II at the King George VI Memorial Chapel at St George's Chapel. They also participated in the Beating Retreat Ceremony and State Banquet. On September 18, President Trump held a bilateral meeting with Prime Minister Keir Starmer at Chequers.	
Virginia	Sterling	September 20	President Trump played golf at Trump National Golf Club.	
Virginia	Mount Vernon	September 20	President Trump attended the American Cornerstone Institute Founders' Dinner at Mount Vernon.	
Arizona	Glendale	September 21	Arriving via Luke Air Force Base, President Trump attended the memorial service of Charlie Kirk at State Farm Stadium.	
New York	New York City	September 22–23	Arriving via John F. Kennedy International Airport and flying to Downtown Manhattan Heliport on Marine One, President Trump spent the night at Trump Tower. On September 23, President Trump delivered remarks at the United Nations General Assembly at the headquarters of the United Nations. He held bilateral meeting with United Nations Secretary-General António Guterres, French President Emmanuel Macron, Argentian President Javier Milei, Uzbek President Shavkat Mirziyoyev, European Commission President Ursula von der Leyen and Ukrainian President Volodymyr Zelenskyy. He and First Lady Melania Trump attended the United Nations Leaders Reception at Lotte New York Palace Hotel.	
New York	Farmingdale	September 26	Arriving via Republic Airport, President Trump attended the 2025 Ryder Cup at Bethpage Black Course.	
Virginia	Sterling	September 27	President Trump played golf at Trump National Golf Club.	
Virginia	Sterling	September 28	President Trump played golf at Trump National Golf Club.	
Virginia	Quantico	September 30	President Trump attended a meeting of U.S. generals and admirals at Marine Corps Base Quantico.	

== October ==
Country/ U.S. state	Areas visited	Dates	Details	Image
Virginia	Sterling	October 4	President Trump played golf at Trump National Golf Club.	
Virginia	Norfolk	October 5	President Trump and First Lady Melania Trump observed a Naval Sea Power Demonstration at USS George H. W. Bush. He delivered remarks at the United States Navy 250th anniversary celebration at USS Harry S. Truman.	
Maryland	Bethesda	October 10	President Trump visited Walter Reed National Military Medical Center for a CT scan as well as preventive health screenings and immunizations, including annual influenza and updated COVID-19 booster vaccinations. He also met with the troops.	
Virginia	Sterling	October 11	President Trump played golf at Trump National Golf Club.	
Israel	Jerusalem	October 13	Arriving via Ben Gurion Airport, President Trump met with Prime Minister Benjamin Netanyahu, in order to finalize a Gaza hostages-for-ceasefire deal. He also met with Hostage Families and addressed the Knesset.	
Egypt	Sharm El Sheikh	October 13	Arriving via Sharm El Sheikh International Airport, President Trump chaired the 2025 Gaza peace summit at the Tonino Lamborghini International Convention Center in order to finalize a Gaza hostages-for-ceasefire deal.	
Florida	Mar-a-Lago, West Palm Beach	October 17–19	Arriving via Palm Beach International Airport, President Trump visited Mar-a-Lago for the weekend. He participated in the MAGA Inc. dinner. On Saturday and Sunday, he played golf at Trump International Golf Club.	
Qatar	Al Udeid Air Base	October 25	Arriving from Ramstein Air Base, during a second refueling stop en route to Malaysia, President Trump met with Emir Tamim bin Hamad Al Thani and Prime Minister Mohammed bin Abdulrahman bin Jassim Al Thani.	
Malaysia	Kuala Lumpur	October 26–27	Arriving via Kuala Lumpur International Airport, President Trump attended the 47th ASEAN summit. Also attended the signing ceremony of a Kuala Lumpur Peace Accord with Cambodian prime minister Hun Manet and Thai prime minister Anutin Charnvirakul at the Kuala Lumpur Convention Centre.	
Japan	Tokyo, Yokosuka	October 27–29	Arriving via Haneda Airport, President Trump met with Emperor Naruhito at the Tokyo Imperial Palace. On October 28, President Trump met with Prime Minister Sanae Takaichi at Akasaka Palace. He visited with troops and delivered remarks on the USS George Washington at Yokosuka Naval Base.	
South Korea	Gyeongju, Busan	October 29–30	Arriving via Gimhae International Airport, President Trump delivered remarks at the APEC CEO Luncheon at Gyeongju Arts Center and participated in a U.S.–APEC Leaders Working Dinner at Hilton Hotel Gyeongju. He held a bilateral meeting with President Lee Jae Myung at the Gyeongju National Museum and was awarded the Grand Order of Mugunghwa. On October 30, President Trump attended the summit meeting with Chinese leader Xi Jinping at Gimhae Air Base.	
Alaska	Anchorage	October 30	President Trump briefly stopped at Joint Base Elmendorf-Richardson to refuel.	
Florida	Mar-a-Lago	October 31	Arriving via Palm Beach International Airport, President Trump visited Mar-a-Lago for the weekend.	

== November ==
Country/ U.S. state	Areas visited	Dates	Details	Image
Florida	Mar-a-Lago, West Palm Beach	November 1–2	President Trump continued his weekend at Mar-a-Lago. On Saturday, he played golf at Trump International Golf Club. That evening, he attended a MAGA Inc. dinner at for the MAGA Inc. super PAC.	
Florida	Miami	November 5	Arriving via Miami International Airport, President Trump delivered remarks at the America Business Forum at the Kaseya Center.	
Florida	Mar-a-Lago, West Palm Beach	November 7–9	Arriving via Palm Beach International Airport, President Trump visited Mar-a-Lago for the weekend. On Saturday and Sunday, he played golf at Trump International Golf Club.	
Maryland	Landover	November 9	President Trump attended the Washington Commanders vs. Detroit Lions game at Northwest Stadium.	
Virginia	Arlington	November 11	President Trump participated in a wreath-laying ceremony at the Tomb of the Unknown Soldier in Arlington National Cemetery on Veterans Day and delivered the Veterans Day address at the Memorial Amphitheater.	
Florida	Mar-a-Lago, West Palm Beach	November 14–16	Arriving via Palm Beach International Airport, President Trump visited Mar-a-Lago for the weekend. On Saturday and Sunday, he played golf at Trump International Golf Club. On November 15, 2025, Trump and South Carolina U.S. Senator Lindsay Graham took part in the third annual Trump-Graham Golf Classic golf fundraiser in support of Graham's reelection campaign.	
Florida	Mar-a-Lago, West Palm Beach	November 25–30	Arriving via Palm Beach International Airport, President Trump and First Lady Melania Trump visited Mar-a-Lago for the Thanksgiving holiday. From Wednesday through Sunday, he played golf at Trump International Golf Club.	

== December ==
Country/ U.S. state	Areas visited	Dates	Details	Image
Pennsylvania	Mount Pocono	December 9	Arriving via Wilkes-Barre/Scranton International Airport, President Trump discussed the economy and inflation at Mount Airy Casino Resort.	
Maryland	Baltimore	December 13	Flying to Baltimore on Marine One, President Trump attended the 126th Army–Navy Game at M&T Bank Stadium.	
Delaware	Dover	December 17	President Trump attended the dignified transfer at Dover Air Force Base of the bodies of the 2 Iowa Air National Guard members killed in the Palmyra attack.	
North Carolina	Rocky Mount	December 19	Arriving via Rocky Mount–Wilson Regional Airport, President Trump discussed the economy and inflation at the Rocky Mount Event Center.	
Florida	Mar-a-Lago, West Palm Beach	December 20–31	Arriving via Palm Beach International Airport, President Trump visited Mar-a-Lago for Christmas and New Year's. On December 20–24, he played golf at Trump International Golf Club, returning to the course on December 26–28 and again on December 30. On December 28, he met with Ukrainian President Volodymyr Zelenskyy. On December 29, he met with Israeli Prime Minister Benjamin Netanyahu.	

== See also ==
- List of international presidential trips made by Donald Trump
- List of Donald Trump rallies (2025–present)
- Lists of presidential trips made by Donald Trump
