= Presidential golf =

Playing of golf by presidents of the United States

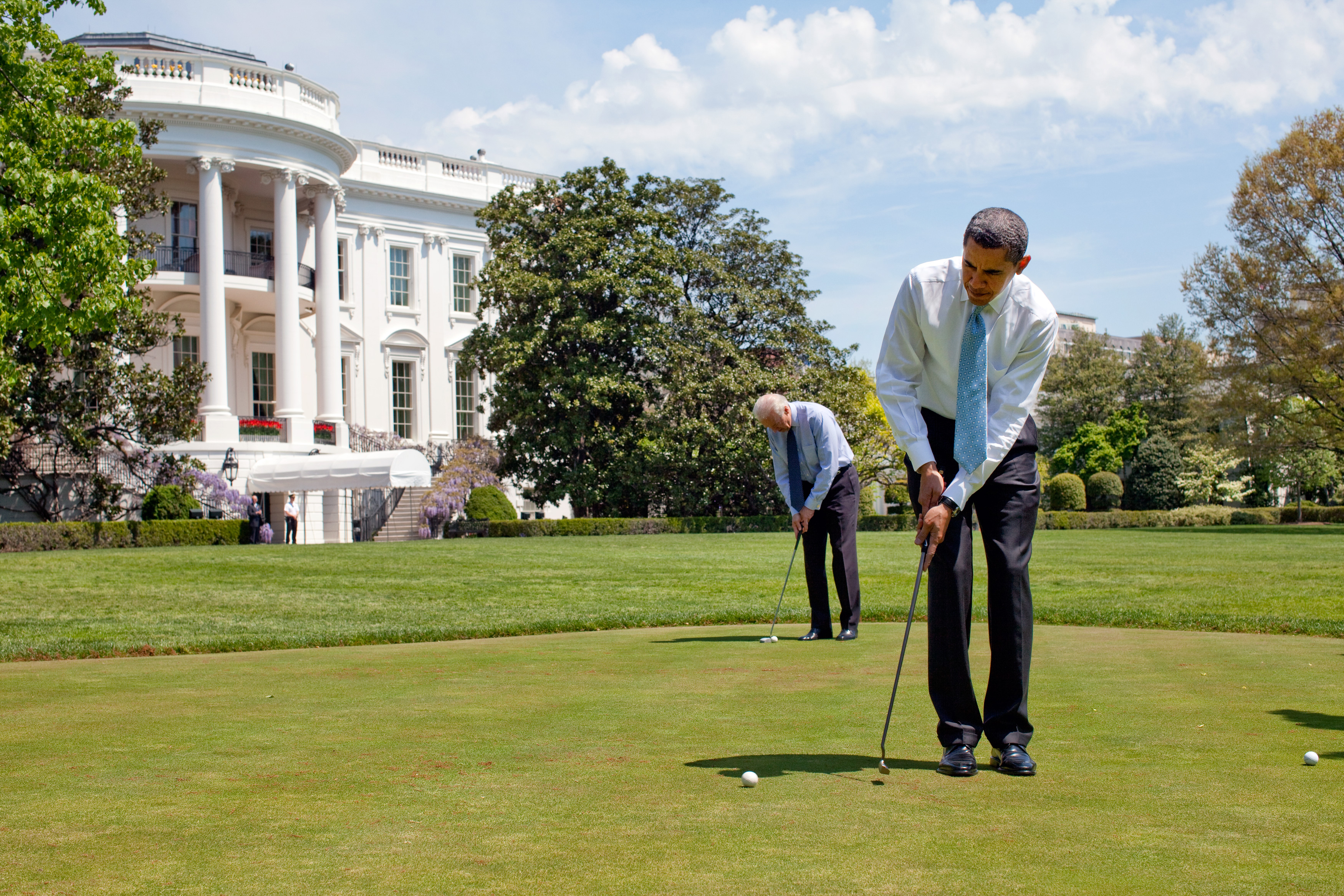
President Barack Obama and then Vice President Joe Biden on the White House putting green in April 2009.

Golf is a popular sport for presidents of the United States and has been described as a bipartisan tradition.

== Presidents ==
=== Dwight Eisenhower ===
From 1953 to 1961, President Dwight D. Eisenhower played more than 1,000 days of golf.

=== George W. Bush ===
George W. Bush hit his first hole-in-one at Trinity Forest Golf Club on March 20, 2019.

=== Barack Obama ===
Barack Obama played 333 rounds of golf during his two terms as president.

=== Donald Trump ===
In his first term, Donald Trump is estimated to have played about 261 rounds of golf, which is more than once a week. From his second inauguration in January 2025 until October that year, he was estimated to have played 72 rounds of golf.
