= Trump National Golf Club Colts Neck =

Golf club in Colts Neck, New Jersey

- Location within the United States Location within New Jersey
- 40.276143°N 74.176185°W

Club information
- Location: Colts Neck Township, New Jersey, U.S.
- Established: 2005
- Type: Private, country club
- Total holes: 18
- Website: trumpcoltsneck.com
- Aerial view of the clubhouse and heliport in 2025.

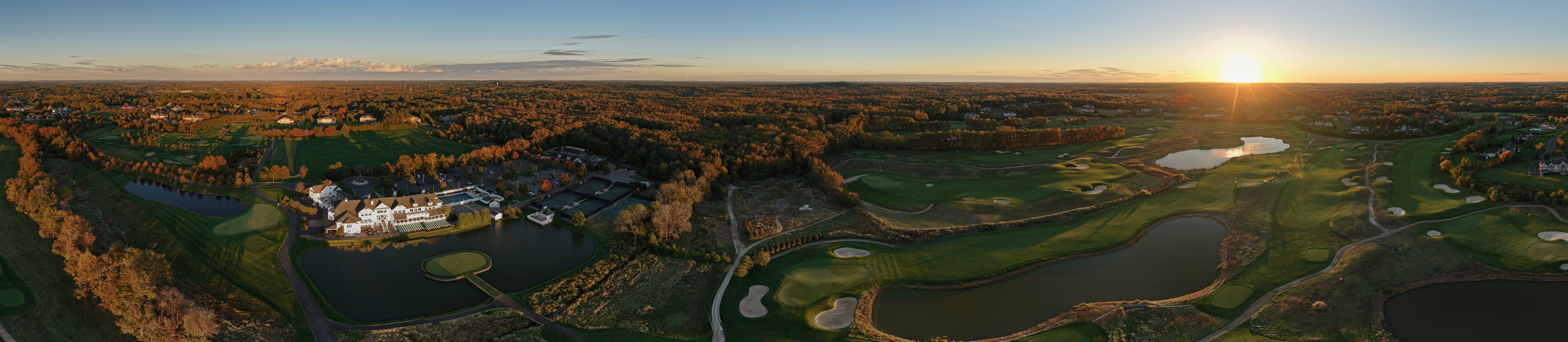
An aerial panorama of Trump National Golf Club Colts Neck during golden hour.

Trump National Golf Club Colts Neck is a private golf and country club in Colts Neck Township, Monmouth County, New Jersey. The course was designed by former U.S. Open champion Jerry Pate and opened as Shadow Isle Golf Club. Donald Trump bought the property out of foreclosure in 2008 and renamed it Trump National Colts Neck. The club has been involved in disputes over a private helistop, water use and alcohol service, and its farmland tax treatment has drawn press coverage.

== History ==
The course was developed as Shadow Isle Golf Club by the O'Neill family. The township planning board gave the course preliminary approval in October 2000; its first seven holes were to be integrated into Colts Neck Country Club, a 49-house development that the same developer was building off Hominy Hill Road. A 49-house development had been proposed in 1992 for the site of the former Colts Neck Airport, a grass airfield that closed in 1988 after the owners of its 416-acre tract reached an agreement with the township to build houses and a golf course there. Gannett New Jersey reported in 2008 that the club had opened in 2004, whereas a 2017 New Jersey PGA release said that it opened in April 2005. In July 2008, Gannett New Jersey reported that Amboy Bank, which had financed the development, had filed a $41.6 million foreclosure lawsuit against the club, that $1.2 million in construction liens had been filed against it, and that, according to sources familiar with the negotiations, Trump had offered more than $28 million to the O'Neill family. The club's 110 members voted unanimously to accept the deal, and members who had paid initiation fees of up to $150,000 were to be grandfathered in as members of Trump's club. The report gave the course's size as 310 acres, after the O'Neill brothers bought an adjoining property to enlarge it. A press release reproduced by Scottish Golf View in August 2008 gave the purchase price as $28 million and the property's size as 450 acres.

The clubhouse and island green after snowfall, January 2026

According to ProPublica, Trump bought the 300-acre course out of foreclosure in 2008, spent millions to upgrade it, and renamed it Trump National Colts Neck.

== Course ==
Top-down aerial view of the clubhouse complex, with the pond and island green below, August 2025

The course was laid out by Jerry Pate. A golf-course website describes it as inspired by links courses and credits Tom Fazio II with later refinements, the most noticeable of which is an island green in front of the clubhouse that is not part of the round of 18. The club's website describes a private club with a par-72 championship course and a five-hole short course.

== Tournaments and events ==
The New Jersey State Golf Association scheduled its 2009 Mid-Amateur Championship for May 4–6 at the club, which its season preview called the course's first-ever NJSGA event. In 2017 the New Jersey PGA said that the course had hosted the 2012 NJPGA Senior Professional Championship and the 2014 NJPGA/NJSGA Senior Open, and that the club would host its first Section major, the Lincoln Charity Clambake, that year.

In August 2019, Fox News host Pete Hegseth married Fox Nation producer Jennifer Rauchet at the club.

== Controversies and public issues ==
=== Heliport ===
The club's helipad, FAA identifier 60NJ, beside the 18th hole.

The club sought approval for a private helistop. The township's zoning board denied the request, saying that the township prohibits helicopter landing pads and that the noise would be harmful to the area's rural character. On December 12, 2012, the Associated Press reported that a state appeals court had upheld a New Jersey Department of Transportation ruling that the club was entitled to a helistop license; the department restricted its use to Trump, members of his family or a designee for up to 48 times a year and only during the day unless there is an emergency. ProPublica described the dispute as an extended court fight, including appeals, that Trump won, and reported that it prompted the township's mayor to decry his "bully mentality". The Federal Aviation Administration lists the facility as heliport 60NJ: private use, with permission required before landing, active since December 2015, and available for medical-evacuation and public-safety emergencies.

=== Alcohol service and fatal crash ===
On August 30, 2015, a patron who had played golf at the club was driving drunk when his car flipped on a Route 18 on-ramp about four miles from the course; his father, a passenger, died. The driver later pleaded guilty to a vehicular homicide charge. In October 2019 the state attorney general's office sought to revoke the club's liquor license, saying the club had sold alcohol to an already intoxicated person. State officials also alleged that the club served liquor other than beer from carts, in violation of its license. In July 2021 the club did not contest the charges and agreed to pay $400,000 in four annual installments of $100,000 through 2024, to stop serving alcohol through cart service until December 31, and to provide staff training. Patch, citing The Washington Post, reported that the penalty equaled 6.5 percent of the club's 2020 revenue and that a state spokeswoman said that, "to the best of [the state's] knowledge," it was the first case in the history of New Jersey's alcoholic beverage division "involving a golf club charged with serving alcohol to a visibly intoxicated patron who later caused a fatal motor vehicle crash".

=== Water use and environmental compliance ===
In 2011, after a drought, Trump sought a permit that would more than triple the club's yearly water allowance. ProPublica reported that the request was unpopular because almost all houses in Colts Neck relied on groundwater wells and some had gone dry the previous summer. The state granted the permit in August 2011 on condition that the club alter three irrigation ponds and build a fourth, so that its increased water use would come from sources unlikely to drain the supply for homeowners. For five consecutive years starting in 2011, the club exceeded its annual water limits, and it received annual notices warning of "substantial monetary penalties" of up to $50,000 per day per offense.

The dispute was settled in April 2016 through a consent order with the New Jersey Department of Environmental Protection (DEP). The order required the club to plant drought-resistant grasses, irrigate less of the course's acreage and install more sophisticated irrigation systems, and the club would meet most of its needs by buying rights to use 15 million gallons annually from New Jersey American Water. The DEP assessed a fine of $294,000, which was cut in half to $147,000 (plus $2,790 in interest) as part of the settlement. Trump's environmental consultant said that the course "had never complied with the water allocation rules of the State of New Jersey" before Trump bought it, and asserted: "We saved the club, and brought all environmental issues including water allocation into compliance." A DEP official, Raymond Bukowski, asserted that Trump received no special treatment.

In April 2017 the Trump Organization received another notice that the Colts Neck club had exceeded its monthly water limits five times in 2016. As of ProPublica's March 2018 report, the state and the Trump Organization had not resolved the violation.

=== Farmland assessment tax treatment ===
Business Insider summarized a 2016 Wall Street Journal report, based on public records and tax-break applications, saying that New Jersey law permits Trump's Bedminster and Colts Neck properties to receive a farmland tax break. The Colts Neck property was listed with 40 acres of hay production and trees; the Bedminster property, with 113 acres of hay farming and eight goats. The Journal estimated that Trump paid less than $1,000 a year in property taxes on land that would typically require roughly $80,000. The outlet described the farmland-assessment program as both popular and controversial in New Jersey.

== See also ==
- Donald Trump and golf
- List of things named after Donald Trump
