= White House putting green =

Golf putting green at the White House

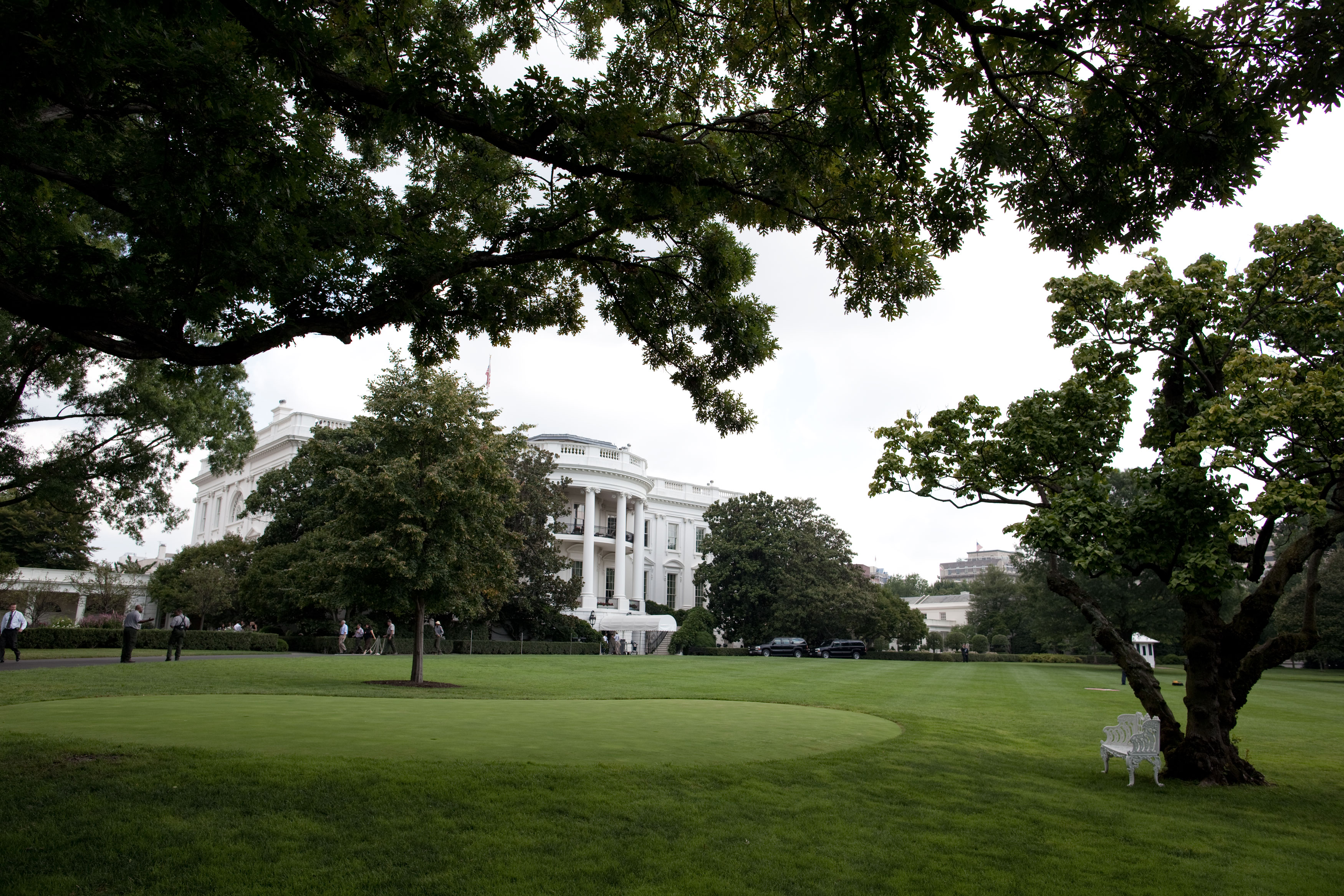
The putting green on the South Lawn in 2009

The putting green at the White House, the official residence of the president of the United States, is located on the South Lawn near the West Wing.

It was first installed in 1954 by President Dwight D. Eisenhower who was an avid golfer. Eisenhower also created two par 3 holes at Camp David. Eisenhower was plagued by squirrels on the green and ordered the United States Secret Service to trap them and remove them to Camp David.

It was removed by President Richard Nixon. The putting green was reinstalled by President George H. W. Bush in 1991. However President Bill Clinton moved it to its current location just south of the Rose Garden, a short walk from the Oval Office. Robert Trent Jones Jr. recreated the putting green for Clinton in 1995. The work was funded by donations of time and machinery and required no public funds. It is on the same site of Eisenhower's original green.

The green is roughly 2,000 square feet (190 m^{2}) in size. The green does not have a bunker; it was not included at the behest of the Secret Service who feared that an errant golf shot from the bunker could damage the White House. President George W. Bush's dog Barney was known to retrieve balls from the hole for the president.

== Gallery ==
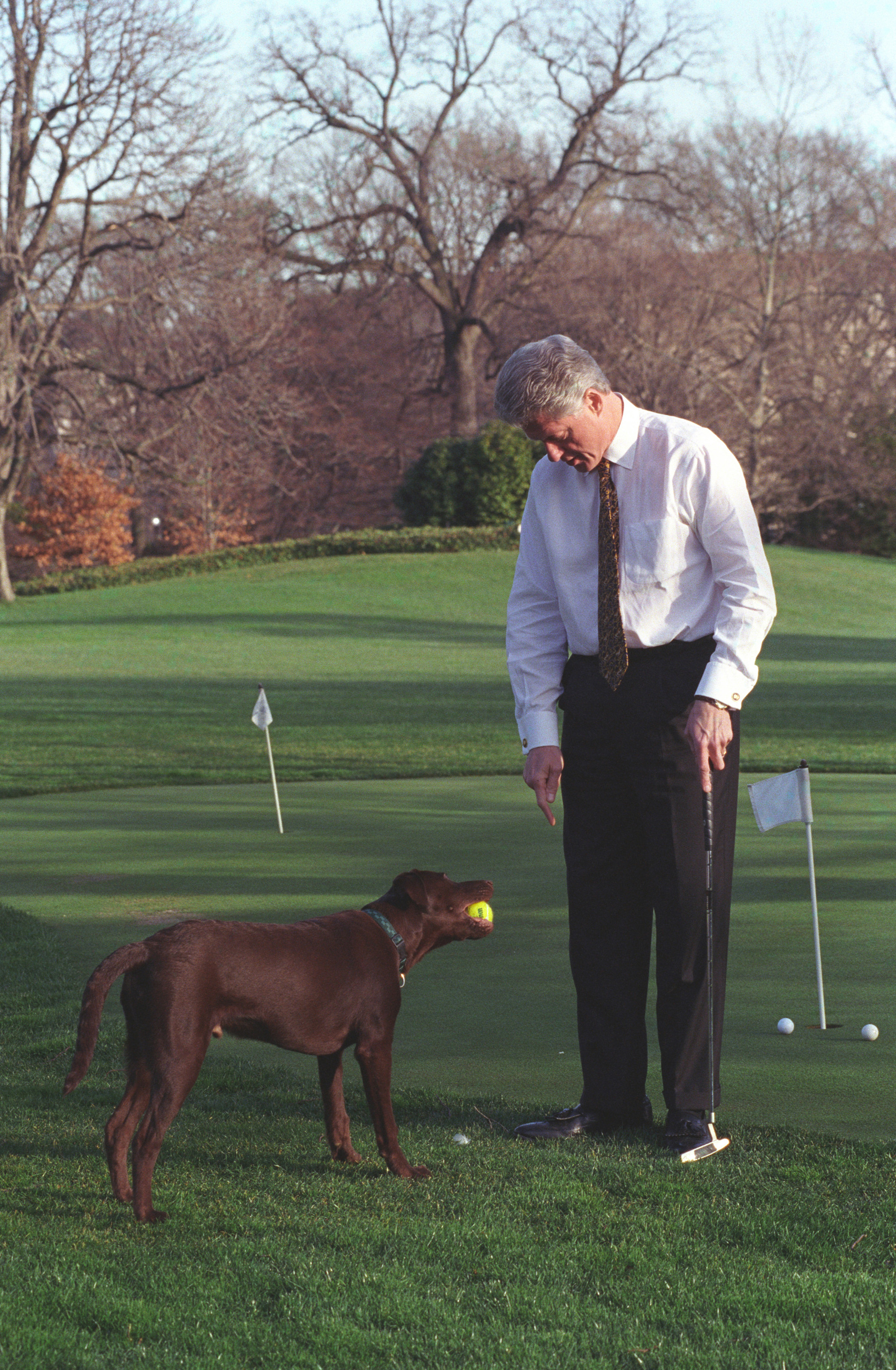
Bill Clinton and his dog Buddy in 1998

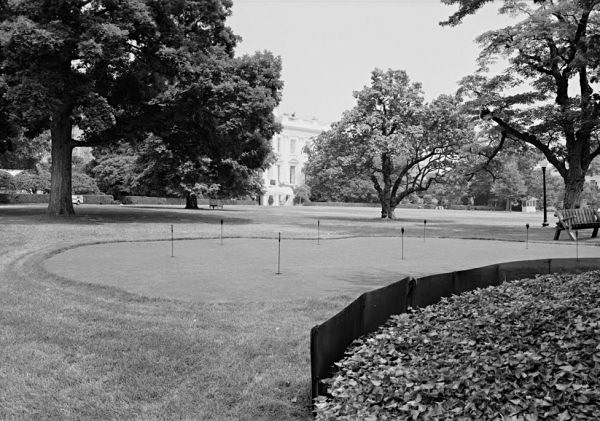
The putting green in 1992

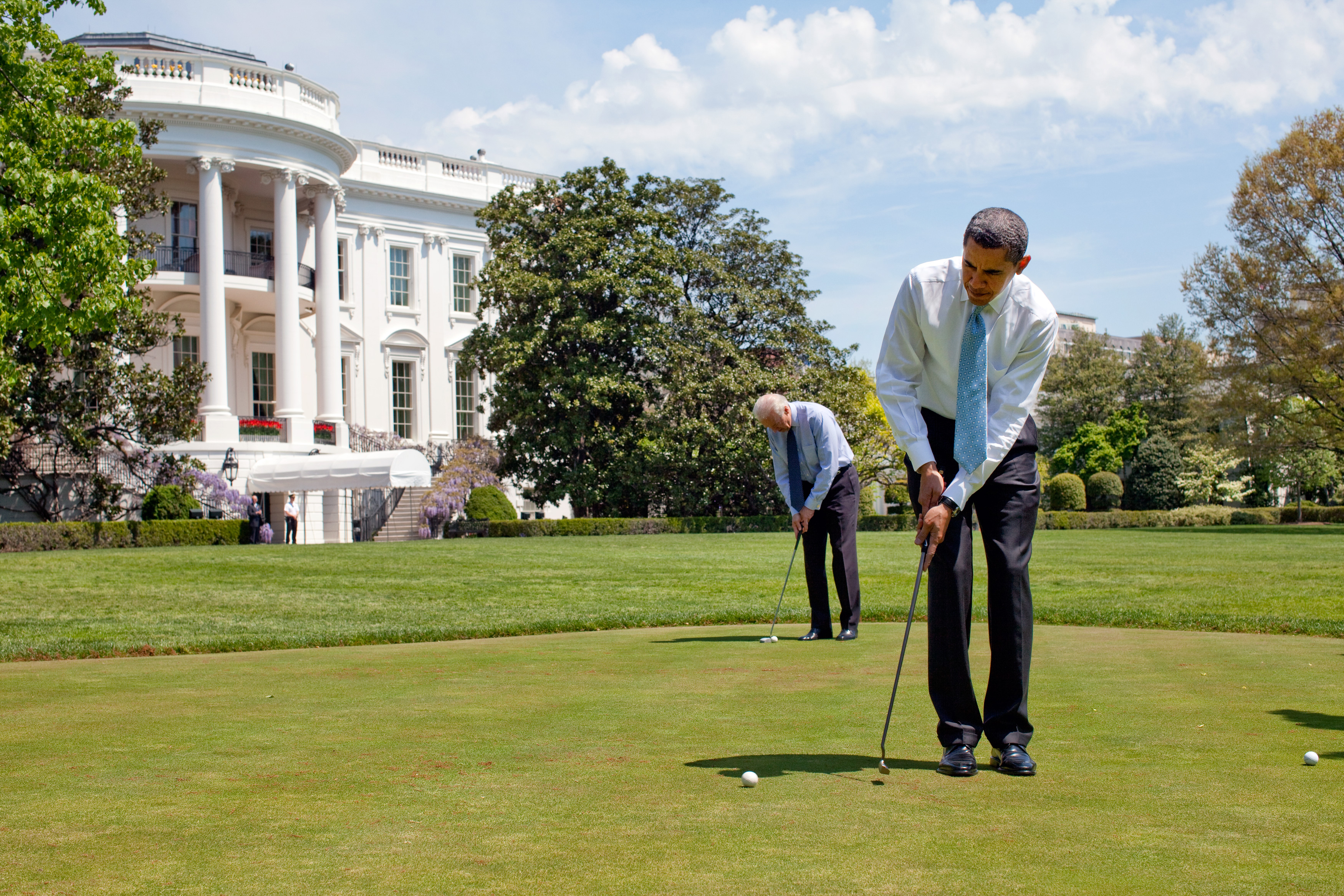
Barack Obama and Joe Biden on the putting green in 2009
