= Trump International Golf Links & Hotel Ireland =

Golf course and hotel in Ireland

Coordinates: 52°44′50″N 9°29′56″W

Trump International Golf Links
- Interactive map of Trump International Golf Links

Club information
- Location: Doonbeg, County Clare, Ireland
- Established: 2002; 24 years ago
- Owner: Donald J. Trump Revocable Trust
- Total holes: 18
- Tournaments: 2026 Irish Open
- Fairways: Fescues, bentgrass and ryegrass
- Website: trumpgolfireland.com
- Designed by: Greg Norman
- Par: 72
- Length: 7,400 yards (6,800 m)
- Course record: 62 (Shane Lowry, 2026)
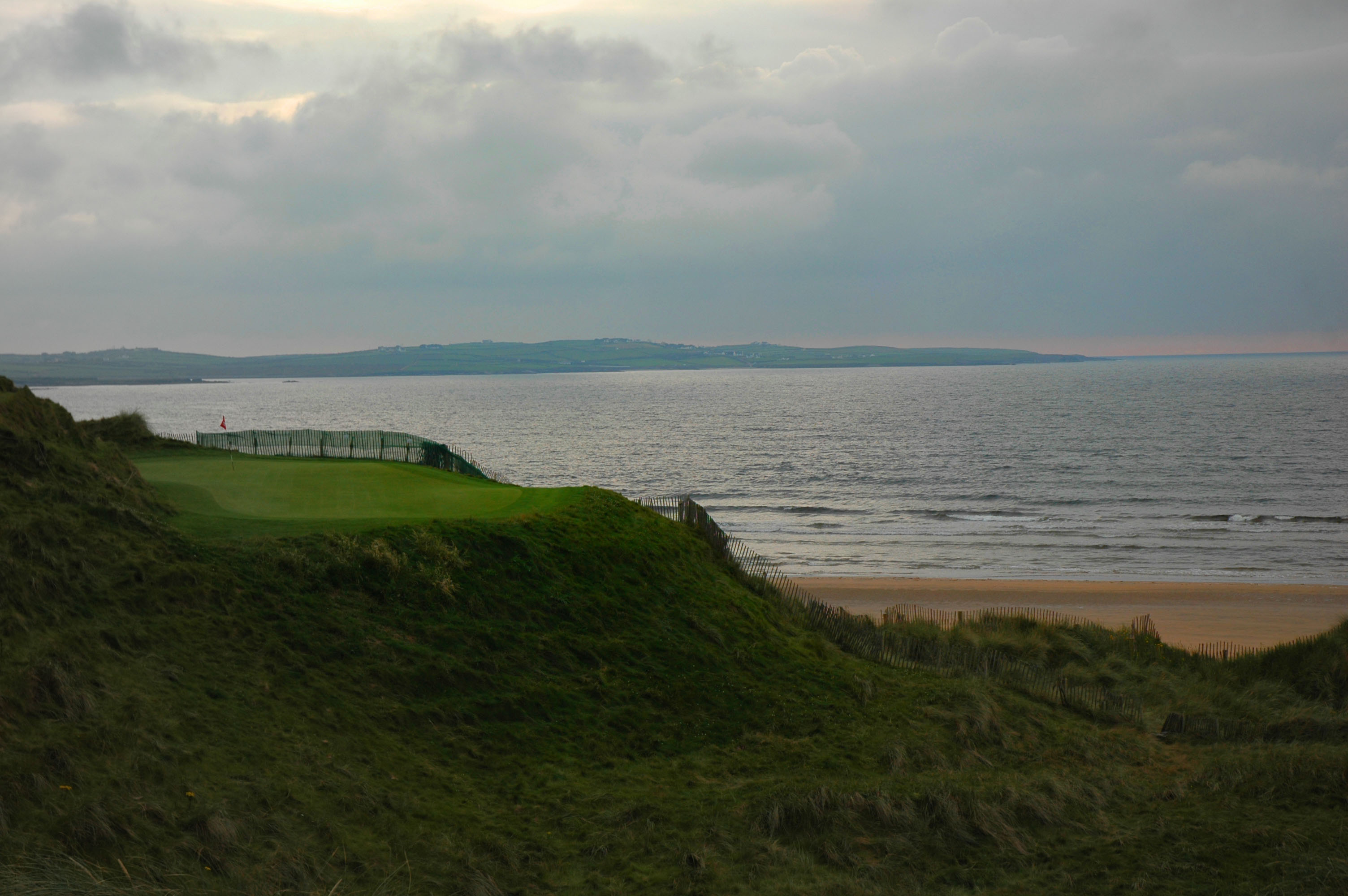
- The 14th hole at Doonbeg in 2007.

Trump International Golf Links & Hotel, formerly Doonbeg Golf Club, is a traditional links-type course situated to the north of Doonbeg in County Clare, Ireland. Designed by Greg Norman and opened in 2002, the geography was hardly changed as the course was fitted into the area provided. The complex hosts a five-star hotel, spa, cottages and reception rooms. In 2022, Golf Digest listed it as the ninth-best course in the Republic of Ireland.

== History ==
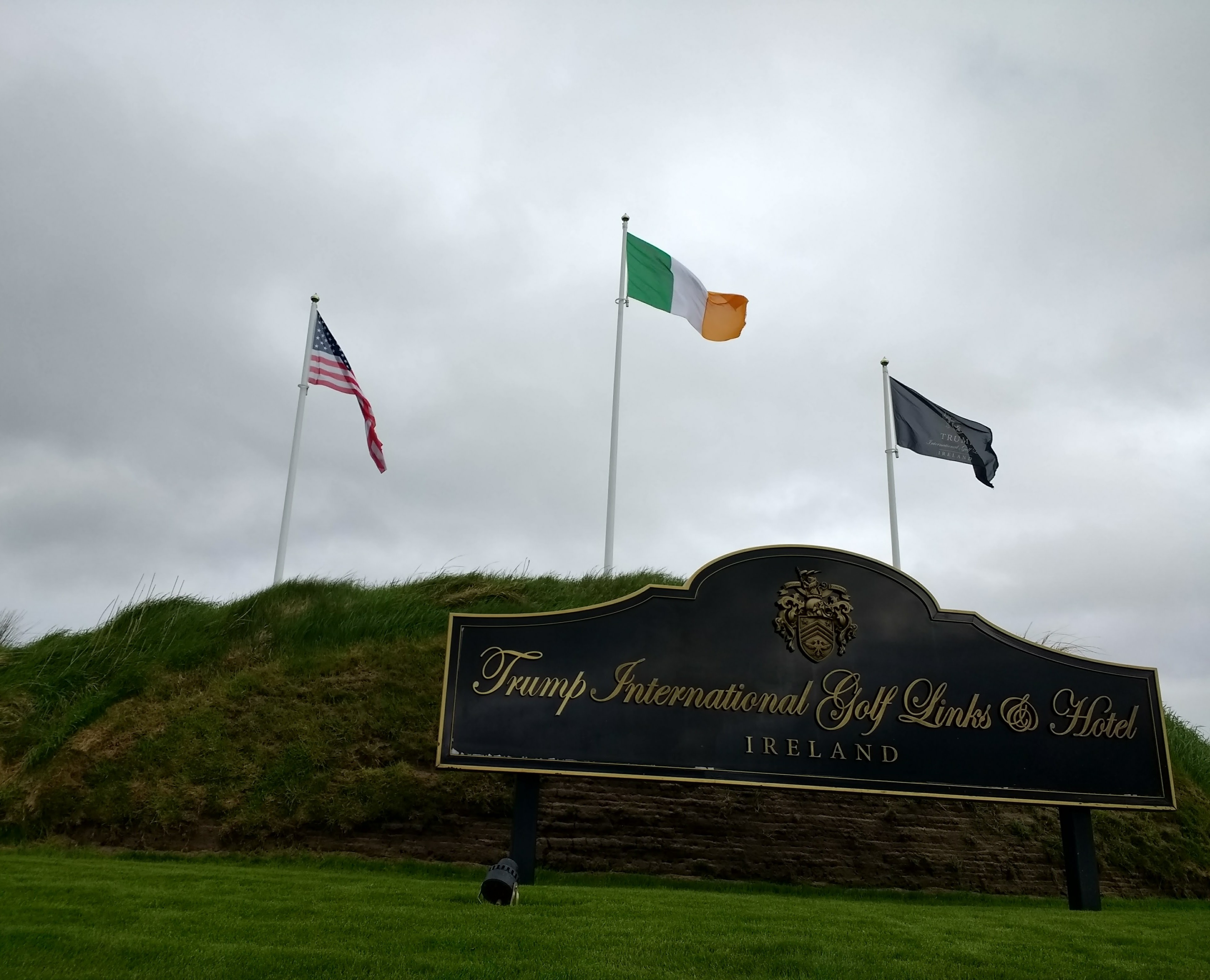
The entrance to the Trump International Golf Links and Hotel.

Doonbeg Golf Club was created by Kiawah Development Partners (KDP) of Kiawah Island, South Carolina. The course was designed by Greg Norman and the club opened in 2002. Pádraig Harrington played a match with Norman for the course's opening. Golf Digest ranked it as the "Best New International Course of 2002". Ron Whitten of Golf Digest compared it to nearby Lahinch Golf Club and Ballybunion Golf Club, and wrote that "Doonbeg looks and plays like it has been there for a hundred years." The Irish Examiner said in 2003 that Doonbeg was a private club with some public play, and had garnered 220 paid members within six months of opening.

In 2005, The Irish Times described the Doonbeg golf resort as a €150-million project. The club's on-site accommodation and lodge opened in 2006. Total employment related to the development was reported to be 220 jobs. The project had started as an initiative by the local community to encourage tourism to the area and was assisted by Shannon Development, who marketed the idea to KDP. Under KDP's ownership, Doonbeg regularly attracted visitors such as NFL player Dan Marino and singer Andrea Corr, who had her wedding reception at Doonbeg. Marino also served on the club's advisory board, as did Terry Wogan and American politician George J. Mitchell.

Amidst mounting debt, the Doonbeg Golf Club and Lodge at Doonbeg was listed for sale and entered receivership in January 2014. The next month, the property was bought by American businessman Donald Trump for an estimated €15 million and it was rebranded as Trump International Golf Links, Ireland. The Lodge at Doonbeg consists of 218 hotel suites, a spa and several restaurants managed by the Trump Hotel Collection. Trump received a red-carpet welcoming party when he visited Ireland after completing the purchase. Then Irish Minister for Finance, Michael Noonan, was criticised for participating in the ceremony. Noonan defended his participation and said Trump had stated that he planned to spend "double the purchase price for investment down there".

During a presidential campaign rally in February 2016 at Kiawah Island, Trump said he bought Doonbeg during an economic downturn in Ireland and had "spent a lot of money on making it just perfecto", but stated: "I don’t care about that stuff anymore. It is like small potatoes ... I don’t care about it. I care about making America great again. That’s what I care about." On assuming the office of United States president in January 2017, Trump (along with his daughter Ivanka) resigned as director of the golf complex; his sons Eric and Donald Jr. remained.

Clare footballer David Tubridy spent time at Doonbeg Golf Club when he was a boy (caddying for such visitors as Hugh Grant and Gary Player). When Tubridy became top scorer in National Football League history against Cork in May 2021, his total score in the competition after this game (22–412, i.e. 478 points) causing him to overtake Mickey Kearins, the then Trump-owned establishment celebrated by giving him lifetime membership of its golf club.

In September 2025, the DP World Tour stated that Trump International Doonbeg would host the Amgen Irish Open in 2026. This was the 22nd different venue announced as host of the Irish Open since the tournament was first held in 1927 at Portmarnock Golf Club. Prior to the announcement, Rory McIlroy stated that if the Irish Open "were to go there, I would have no problem. The Scottish Championship was played at a Trump property near Aberdeen there a few weeks ago, looked like it was great event." Taoiseach Micheál Martin stated he would meet Trump at Doonbeg if Trump attended the Irish Open in 2026.

=== Permits for construction ===
Planning permission was granted in 2005 for the construction of an 8-metre (26 ft) stone barrier on the Doughmore beach to protect the golf course from coastal erosion.

The business applied for permits to construct a 2.8-kilometre (1.7 mi) sea wall to protect the property, citing "global warming and its effects", although Trump himself denies the existence of global warming. The plan attracted strong opposition from environmentalists due to concerns that it would adversely affect the Special Area of Conservation status of the site, and was withdrawn in December 2016. In December 2017, permission was granted by Clare County Council for two smaller barriers, however this permission was rescinded in early 2020, following an appeal to An Bord Pleanála.

As of January 2019, a decision on permission for "53 short term let cottages, ballroom and leisure building" was pending subject to a request for "further information" by Clare County Council.

== Financials ==
In 2014, the Irish Independent stated the business at Doonbeg had never turned a profit during 11 years of operation by American property developers Kiawah Partners. It posted a loss of €6.4 million on €10.4 million revenue in 2011, and accumulated losses reached €54 million by the end of that year. Following their purchase of the business in February 2014, the Trump Organization invested over €40 million, including the purchase price, into the Doonbeg resort.

For 2019, the company, TIGL Ireland Enterprises Ltd, which manages the resort reported a pre-tax loss of €1.37 million. In November 2021, the resort reported revenue of €3.8 million in 2020 and an operating loss of €1.98 million, a pre-tax loss of €3.59 million. Its workforce was reduced from 230 to 112, and the company received €459,000 in government grants for COVID relief.

== See also ==
- Donald Trump and golf
