= Presidential Conflicts of Interest Act =

Bill introduced in the US Senate in 2017

The Presidential Conflicts of Interest Act of 2017 is a bill introduced by Democratic Senator Elizabeth Warren to the United States Senate on January 9, 2017, during the 1st session of the 115th United States Congress. The bill's long title is A Bill to Address Financial Conflicts of Interest of the President and Vice President. The associated bill before the United States House of Representatives is HR 371, introduced by Representative Katherine Clark.

In December 2016, Warren announced her intention to introduce the bill to address apparent conflicts of interest held by president-elect Donald Trump.

The bill would require, if passed, the President and Vice President, as well as their spouses, to divest of conflicting assets through a qualified blind trust; prohibit presidential appointees from participating in matters that directly involve the financialinterests of the president; and prohibit the President and Vice President from participating in federal contracts. In addition, this bill would require the President, Vice President, and any major party nominee to be President or Vice President to disclose their three most recent tax returns.

== See also ==
- Ethics in Government Act
- Foreign Emoluments Clause
