= Trump International Golf Club (West Palm Beach) =

Private golf culb in Florida, United States

- Location within Florida
- 26°39′58″N 80°5′54″W

Club information
- Location: West Palm Beach, Florida, United States
- Established: 1999
- Type: Private
- Owner: The Trump Organization
- Total holes: 27
- Tournaments: ADT Championship (2001–2008)
- Website: Official website

Championship
- Designed by: Jim Fazio
- Par: 72
- Length: 7,326 yd (6,699 m)
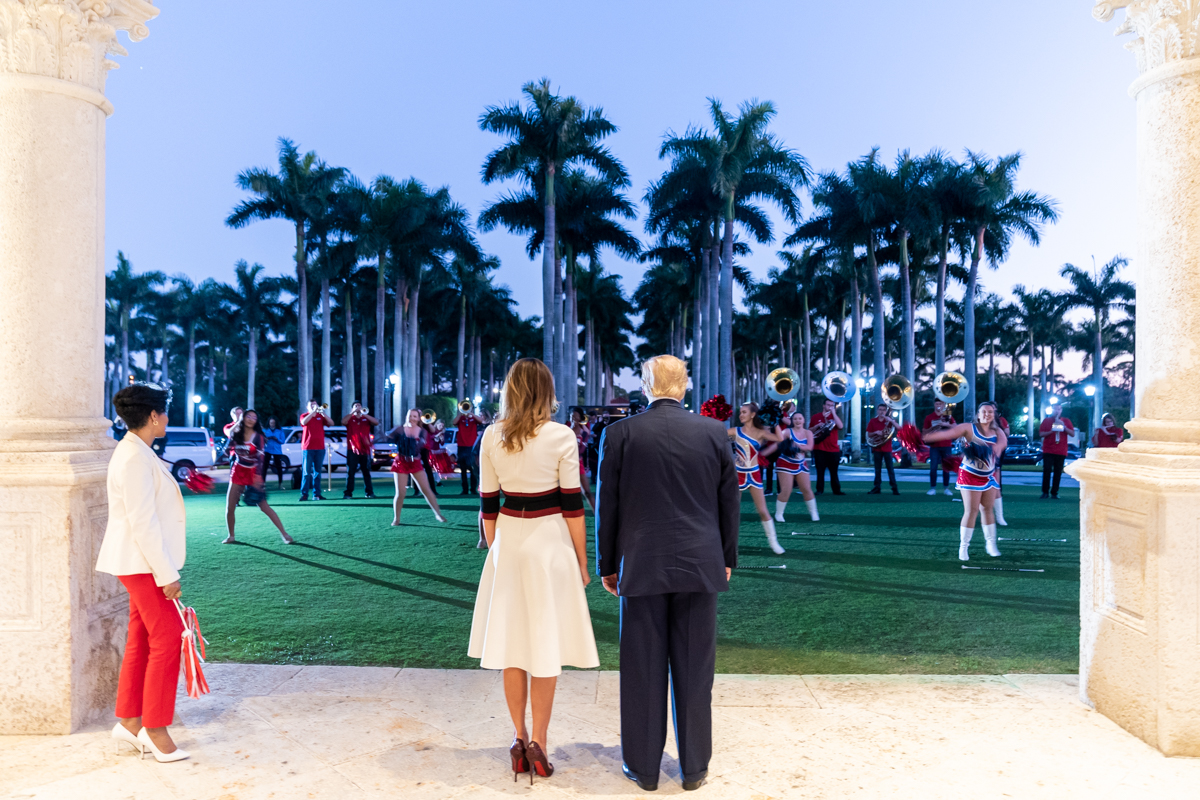
- President Donald Trump and Melania Trump at the Golf Club in 2020

Trump International Golf Club is a private 27-hole golf course in West Palm Beach, Florida. It was designed by Jim Fazio, who was given a budget of over $40 million, and was opened in 1999. This venue was Donald Trump's first golf course property.

The Championship course measures 7,326 yards, and has a par 72 layout that has hosted championships for the LPGA. In addition, the golf course has a nine-hole course. The clubhouse can host weddings and other social or business events. A three-tiered driving range is available.

The regular initiation fee for membership was reported to be $150,000 in 2011, and the annual fee $25,000. The senior director of instruction for Trump Golf Properties, Gary Wiren, is based out of this resort.

== Assassination attempt ==
On September 15, 2024, an assassination attempt occurred at the Trump International Golf Club in West Palm Beach. The incident occurred before 2 p.m. EDT, while Donald Trump was golfing at the club. The perpetrator, later identified as 58-year-old Ryan Wesley Routh, was spotted hiding in nearby shrubbery while aiming a rifle at a member of Trump's security detail. A Secret Service agent fired upon Routh, who fled the scene. The club's golf course was locked down shortly after, and no injuries were reported. Routh was detained while driving northbound on Interstate 95.

Routh was indicted on charges of attempting to assassinate a presidential candidate and, in September 2025, was convicted on all counts. In February 2026, he was sentenced to life in prison.

== See also ==
- Donald Trump and golf
