= Trump National Golf Club Washington, D.C. =

Private golf club in the eastern United States

Trump National Golf Club, Washington, D.C.

- Location within the United States Location within Virginia
- 39.053°N 77.347°W

Club information
- Location: Potomac Falls, Virginia, U.S.
- Type: Private
- Total holes: 36
- Greens: Bentgrass
- Fairways: Bentgrass
- Website: trumpnationaldc.com

Championship Course
- Designed by: Tom Fazio and Arthur Hills
- Par: 72
- Length: 7,693 yards (7,034 m)
- Course rating: 77.9
- Slope rating: 145

Riverview Course
- Designed by: Arthur Hills and Tom Fazio
- Par: 72
- Length: 7,234 yards (6,615 m)
- Course rating: 75.6
- Slope rating: 148
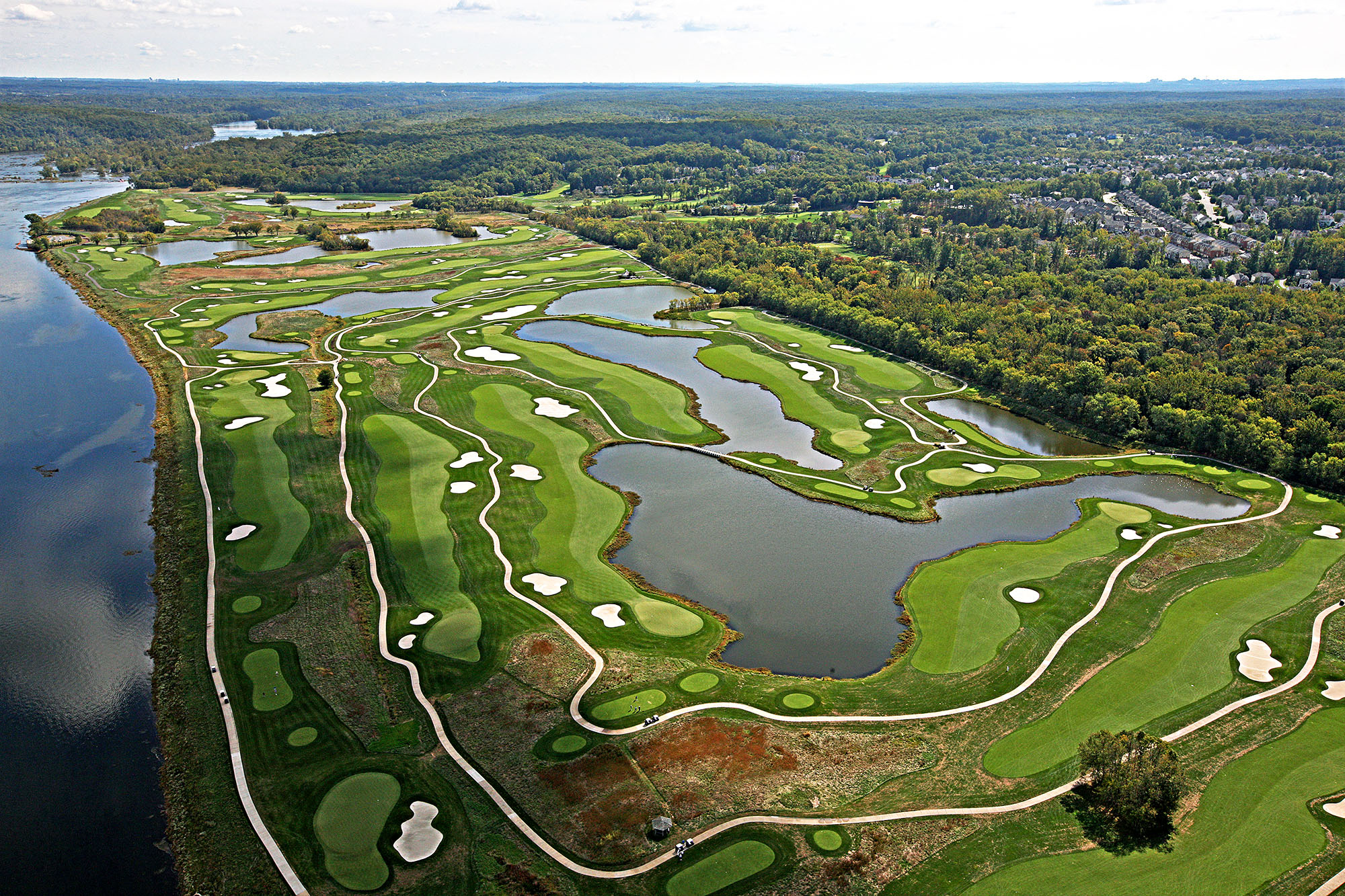
- Aerial view of Trump National Golf Club, Washington, D.C in 2022.

Trump National Golf Club, Washington, D.C. is an 800-acre (320 ha) private golf club in the eastern United States, at Lowes Island in Potomac Falls, Virginia, northwest of Washington, D.C.

It is part of the Trump chain of golf clubs that includes clubs in Los Angeles, Philadelphia, and Bedminster. The club contains two 18-hole golf courses, both par 72. The Championship Course was designed by Tom Fazio, and the Riverview course was added in 1999, when the club was still known as the Lowes Island Club. The Riverview Course abuts the Potomac River and was originally designed by Arthur Hills. The club also contains a 50,000-square-foot (4,600 m^{2}) clubhouse, an 82-foot (25 m) swimming pool, an indoor tennis center, and a fitness center.

== History ==
The Trump National Golf Club (Washington, D.C.) was formerly the Lowes Island Club. Donald Trump purchased the club in 2009 for $13 million from a bank after the previous owner defaulted on its loans. He financed the purchase with a loan from Chevy Chase Bank. Trump then invested at least $25 million into the property. Trump hired Tom Fazio to remake the golf courses. The clubhouse, pool, and other facilities were also renovated. Renovations were completed in June 2015.

An estimated 465 trees were removed to provide unobstructed views of the Potomac River, prompting objections from some. The Trump Organization officials said that many of the trees were weak, in danger of becoming diseased, and presented soil erosion problems; the Loudoun County urban forester and other county officials "did not oppose cutting down some unhealthy trees" but did not feel "that the extent of the removal was necessary". A company official said that trash and debris was also removed from the riverbank.

In 2016, Trump's financial disclosures indicated the property earned $17.5 million in revenue. Eric Trump now manages the club. President Trump visited the club six times between mid-March and the end of May 2017.

The course hosted the Senior PGA Championship in May 2017; Bernhard Langer won his record ninth senior major title. The course has also hosted LIV Golf tournaments in 2023, and in 2026.

=== "River of Blood" monument ===
A curious war memorial located at the club became the object of widespread attention during Trump's 2016 presidential campaign. The monument sits between the 14th hole and the 15th tee on the Championship Course. Shortly after purchasing the club, Trump directed a stone pedestal be built to display a flagpole, and installed a plaque on the pedestal bearing the inscription:

Many great American soldiers, both of the North and South, died at this spot, "The Rapids", on the Potomac River. The casualties were so great that the water would turn red and thus became known as "The River of Blood".

There is no historical record of any such event taking place at the site. One local historian, Craig Swain, cited two soldiers of the 34th New York Infantry Regiment killed by local citizens in 1861 as the only casualties suffered on the island by either side in the Civil War. Two years later, on June 27–28, 1863, General J.E.B. Stuart led 4,500 Confederate soldiers north across the Potomac at Rowser's Ford from the Lowes Island area, on the ride to Gettysburg, but no fatalities were recorded. Professor Scott Hippensteel has estimated that the blood of 50,000 men would have had to drain into the Potomac River to cause a significant stretch of it to visibly "run red" for more than a few seconds.

According to the executive director of the Mosby Heritage Area Association, the only Civil War battle in the area was the Battle of Ball's Bluff, 11 miles (18 km) upriver. Other historians consulted by The New York Times for a story in 2015 agreed. Trump said that "numerous historians" had told him, or had told "my people," the story of the River of Blood, and reasoned that "it makes sense" that "many people were shot," because "That was a prime site for river crossings. So, if people are crossing the river, and you happen to be in a civil war, I would say that people were shot – a lot of them." Told that local historians had called his plaque a fiction, he retorted, "how would they know that? Were they there?"

Some commentators regarded the plaque as representative of a wider pattern of fabrication by Trump or members of his staff.

== See also ==
- Donald Trump and golf
- List of things named after Donald Trump
