= Trump National Golf Club Philadelphia =

Golf club in Pine Hill, New Jersey

Coordinates: 39.7873°N 75.0049°W

Trump National Golf Club, Philadelphia

Club information
- Location: Pine Hill, New Jersey, U.S.
- Type: Private
- Total holes: 18
- Website: trumpnationalphiladelphia.com
- Designed by: Tom Fazio
- Par: 71
- Length: 7,409-yard (6,775 m)
- Course rating: 75.3/153

Trump National Golf Club, Philadelphia is a private golf club located in Pine Hill, New Jersey featuring a 7,409-yard (6,775 m) course designed by Tom Fazio. Formerly named Pine Hill Golf Club, it was purchased and renamed by the Trump Organization on Christmas Eve, 2009. The club sits about 1.5 mi (2.4 km) from Pine Valley Golf Club.

The clubhouse of Trump National Golf Club is set atop a prominent hill 209-foot (64 m) in the middle of Camden County. The 43,000-square-foot (4,000 m^{2}) clubhouse provides panoramic views of the surrounding landscape and Philadelphia city skyline. This hill is 30-foot (9.1 m) lower than Arneys Mount in Burlington County, and 10 feet lower than the highest point in Camden County, which is near Berlin. The golf course was built upon the site of the former Ski Mountain at Pine Hill in 1998.

Golf Digest has described Trump National Golf Club Philadelphia, located in Pine Hill, New Jersey, as a Tom Fazio–designed course featuring rolling terrain near Pine Valley Golf Club. In its biennial "Best in State" rankings, Golf Digest has consistently placed the course among the top courses in New Jersey, including Top 15 finishes in 2003 and 2011–2012, Top 20 placements in 2007–2009, 2015–2016, and 2019–2022, a ranking of 22nd in 2022–2023, and 21st in 2025–2026. In a 2014 interview with Golf Digest, Donald Trump stated that he considered the course comparable to Pine Valley, noting that some players who frequent Pine Valley have expressed similarly favorable views.

== See also ==
- Donald Trump and golf
- List of things named after Donald Trump
