= Trump National Golf Club Jupiter =

Private golf club in Jupiter, Florida

Coordinates: 26.8872°N 80.0896806°W

Trump National Golf Club, Jupiter
- Interactive map of Trump National Golf Club, Jupiter

Club information
- Location: Jupiter, Florida, United States
- Type: Private
- Owner: The Trump Organization
- Total holes: 18
- Website: trumpnationaljupiter.com
- Designed by: Jack Nicklaus
- Par: 72
- Length: 7,404-yard (6,770 m)
- Course rating: 76.5
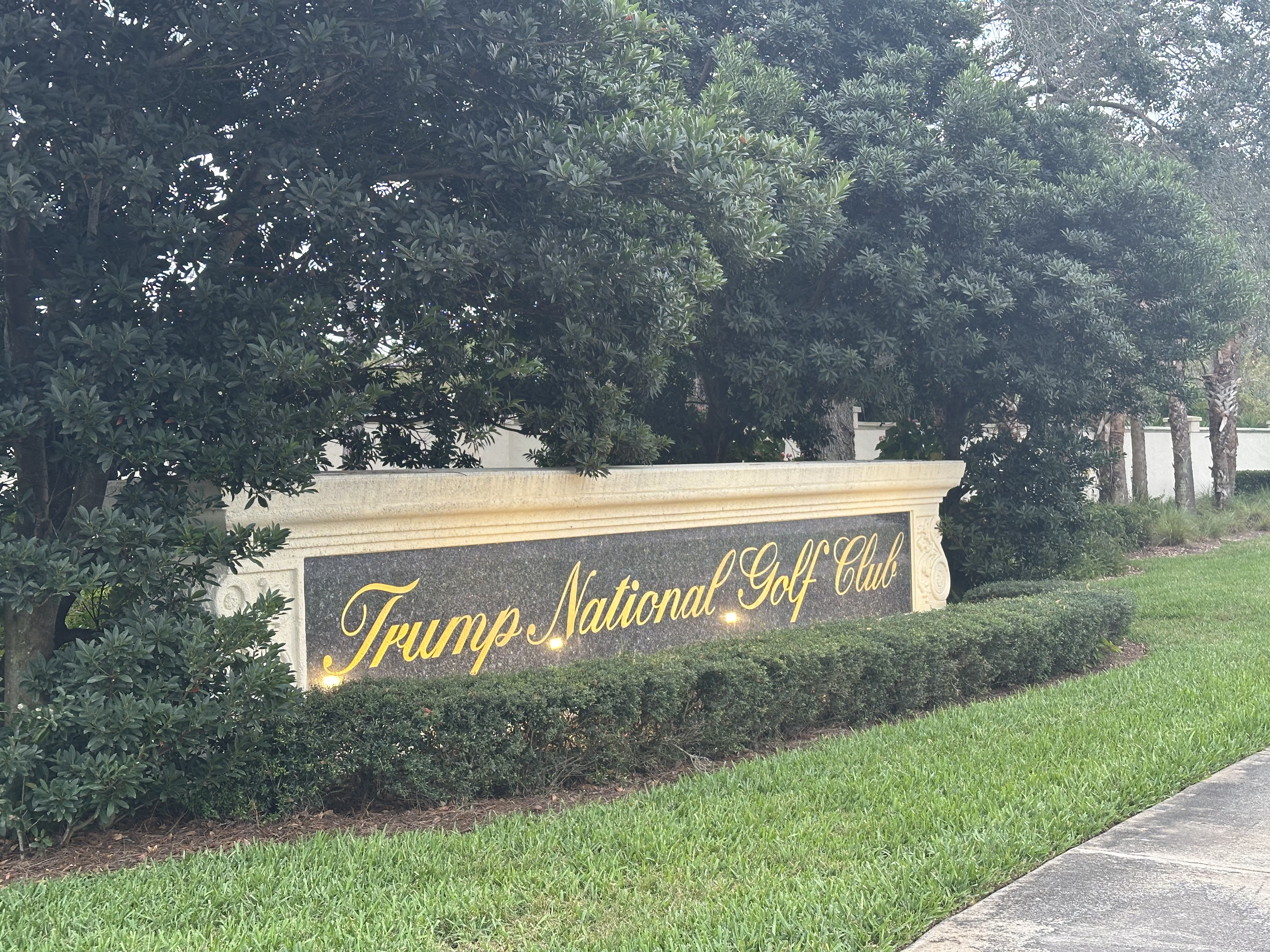
- Entrance sign for Trump National Golf Club Marquee Jupiter in 2024.

Trump National Golf Club, Jupiter is a private golf club in Jupiter, Florida, United States, with a 7,242-yard (6,622 m) course designed by Jack Nicklaus.

The Club is owned by President Donald Trump.

== History ==
The club opened in 2002 as the Ritz-Carlton Golf Club & Spa. In December 2012, Donald Trump purchased the property from Ritz-Carlton for $5 million including the assumption of $30 million in debt from refundable deposits to club members. Former members filed a lawsuit resulting in a February 2017 settlement for $5 million.

On February 11, 2017, President Trump hosted Japanese Prime Minister Shinzō Abe at the Club.

== Scorecard ==
Trump National Golf Club Jupiter
Tee	Rating/Slope	1	2	3	4	5	6	7	8	9	Out	10	11	12	13	14	15	16	17	18	In	Total
Black	76.5 / 150	421	578	422	213	456	622	250	448	402	3812	465	168	439	608	192	384	339	546	451	3592	7404
Gold	73.2 / 144	373	522	368	175	388	568	213	431	361	3401	433	150	396	542	173	348	308	502	406	3258	6659
Blue	71.8 / 140	349	515	365	157	378	536	190	380	351	3221	399	138	386	511	165	343	303	492	369	3133	6354
White	69.6 / 137	340	480	312	138	360	473	173	365	345	2956	360	122	375	455	150	306	296	448	369	2881	5837
SI	Men's	15	7	1	17	5	11	13	3	9		8	16	2	14	18	6	12	10	4
Par		4	5	4	3	4	5	3	4	4	36	4	3	4	5	3	3	3	5	4	36	72
SI	Women's	9	13	1	5	11	15	17	3	7		8	10	2	14	16	12	18	4	6
Red	70.0 / 130	269	442	263	105	298	430	136	284	275	2502	269	88	302	423	108	254	213	402	344	2423	4925

== See also ==
- Donald Trump and golf
