= Trump Tower (disambiguation) =

Trump Tower is a mixed-use skyscraper in Midtown Manhattan in New York City.

Trump Tower or Trump Towers may also refer to:

== Buildings ==
- Trump Tower Manila, Philippines
- Trump Tower Punta del Este, Uruguay
- Trump Towers (Sunny Isles Beach), Florida, US
- Trump Towers Istanbul, Turkey
- Trump Towers Pune, India
- Trump International Hotel and Tower (Chicago), Illinois, US
- Trump International Hotel and Tower (New York City), New York, US
- Trump Tower Kolkata, India

=== Buildings commonly known as "Trump Tower" ===
- 40 Wall Street, also known as The Trump Building, a 70-story skyscraper in New York City, US
- Trump International Hotel Las Vegas, Las Vegas, Nevada, US
- Trump Parc, New York City, US
- Park Tower Stamford, Stamford, Connecticut, US
- Trump Park Avenue, Manhattan, US
- Trump World Tower, New York City, US

=== Unfulfilled proposals ===
- Trump Tower (Tampa), Florida, US (incomplete, abandoned)
- TD Trump Deutschland, Berlin or Stuttgart or Frankfurt, Germany (proposed, never built)
- Trump Tower Moscow, Russia (planned, never built)
- Trump Towers Atlanta, Georgia, US (planned, never built)
- Trump Towers Rio, Brazil (proposed, never built)
- Trump International Hotel and Tower (Baku), Azerbaijan (construction stopped in 2015)
- Trump International Hotel and Tower (Dubai), United Arab Emirates (proposed, never built)
- Trump International Hotel and Tower (New Orleans), US (proposed, never built)
- Trump Ocean Resort Baja Mexico, Tijuana, Mexico (proposed, never built)
- Trump Tower Belgrade, Belgrade, Serbia (proposed in 2022)

=== Formerly called "Trump Tower" ===
- Trump International Hotel and Tower Toronto, now The St. Regis Toronto, Ontario, Canada
- Trump International Hotel and Tower Vancouver, now the Paradox Hotel Vancouver, British Columbia, Canada
- Trump International Hotel and Tower Honolulu, Hawaii, now the Ka Laʻi Waikiki Beach Hotel, Hawaii, US
- Trump Ocean Club International Hotel and Tower, now JW Marriott Panama, Panama City, Panama
- Trump SoHo, now The Dominick, New York City, US
- Trump Tower White Plains, now The Tower at City Place, New York, US

== Other uses ==
- Trump Tower (novel), a 2011 novel by Jeffrey Robinson, originally credited to Donald Trump

== See also ==
- List of properties named after Donald Trump
- Trump (disambiguation)
- Trump International Hotel (disambiguation)
- Trump Plaza (disambiguation)
