= List of things named after Donald Trump =

The following things are named after Donald Trump, the 45th and 47th president of the United States.

== Real estate ==
Note: Any current properties listed in bold are owned directly by Trump himself or the Trump Organization. The rest carry the Trump name through licensing deals.

=== Trump Towers ===
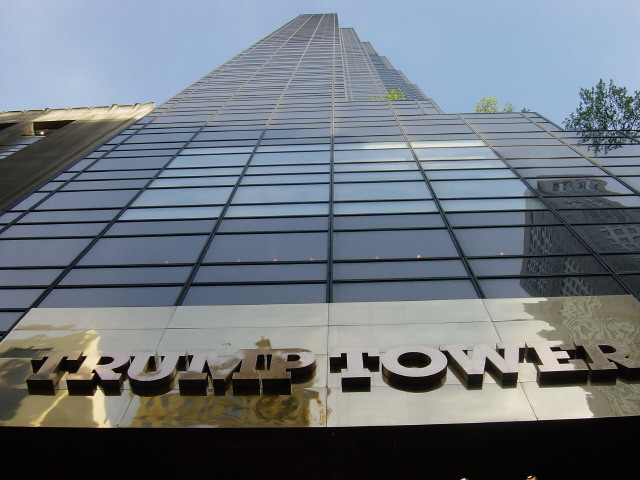
Trump Tower in New York City

==== Current ====
- **Trump Tower, New York City**
- Trump Towers, Sunny Isles Beach, Florida
- Trump Tower Kolkata, Kolkata, India
- Trump Tower Manila, Manila Philippines
- Trump Towers Istanbul, Istanbul Turkey
- Trump Towers Pune, Pune India
- Trump Towers Mumbai, Mumbai, India
- Trump Tower Punta del Este, Uruguay

==== In development ====
- Trump Towers Delhi NCR, Gurgaon, India
- Trump Tower Jeddah, Jeddah, Saudi Arabia
- Trump Tower Dubai, Dubai, United Arab Emirates

==== Former ====
- The Tower at City Place, White Plains, New York (de-branded in June 2022)

==== Cancelled or never completed ====
- Trump Tower Moscow, Moscow, Russia
- Trump Tower, Tampa, Florida
- Trump Towers Atlanta, Atlanta, Georgia, United States
- Trump Towers Rio, Rio de Janeiro, Brazil
- Trump Tower Batumi, Batumi, Georgia
- Trump Tower Bangalore, Bangalore, India
- Trump Tower Damascus, Damascus, Syria
- Trump Tower Denver, Colorado, United States
- Trump Tower Philadelphia, Pennsylvania, United States
- Trump Towers Charlotte, North Carolina, United States
- Trump Tower Dallas, Texas, United States
- Trump Tower West Palm Beach, Florida, United States
- Trump Tower Los Angeles, California, United States
- Trump Tower Seattle, Washington, United States
- Unnamed skyscraper development, Gold Coast, Queensland, Australia

=== Trump Plaza ===
Trump Plaza is a brand of apartment buildings licensed to various proprietors.

- New Rochelle, New York
- New York City

==== Former ====
- The Plaza (West Palm Beach) (previously **Trump Plaza** until January 2021)
- Jersey City

=== Other Trump buildings ===
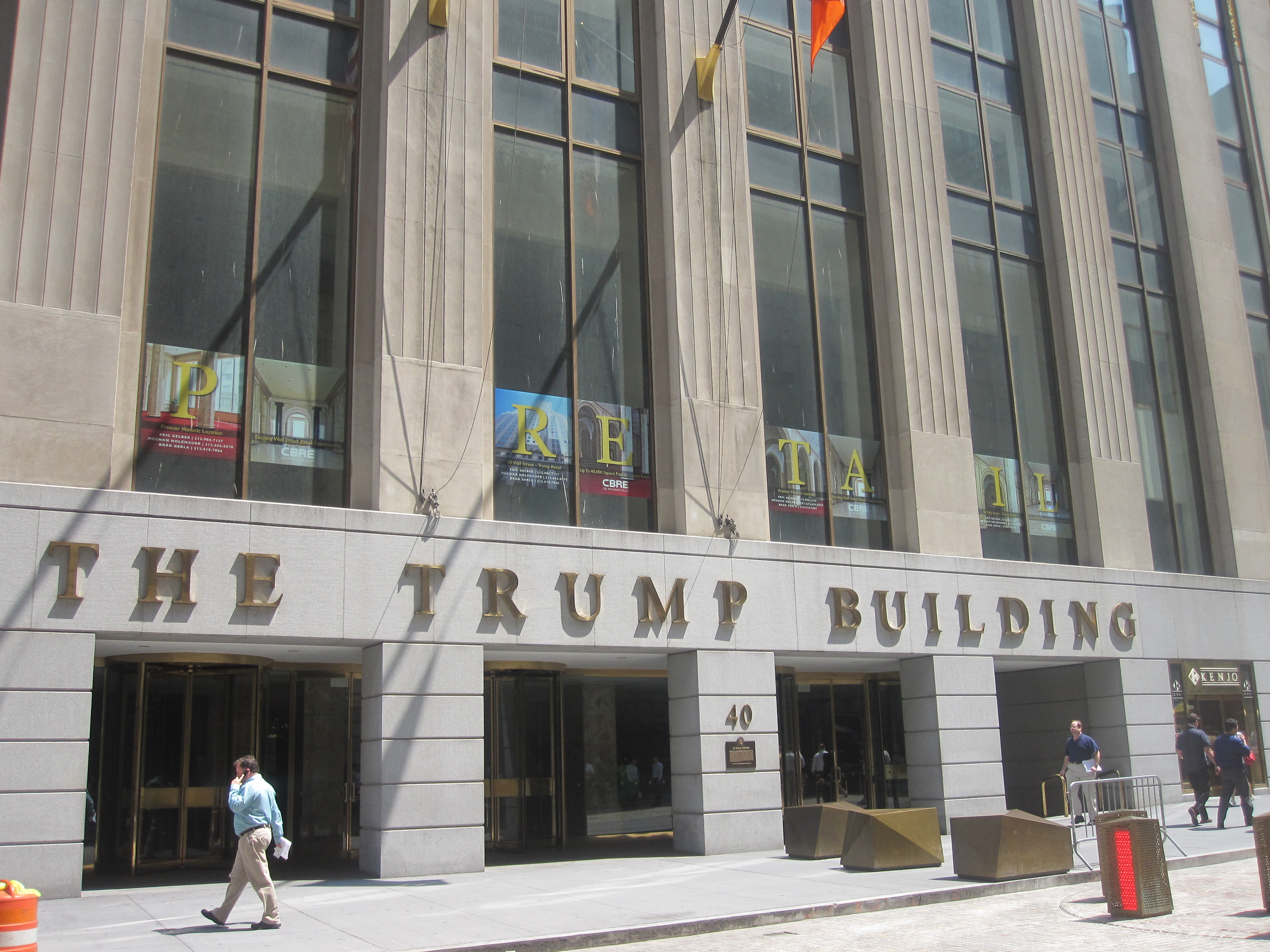
The Trump Building – New York City

==== Current ====
===== New York City =====
- **The Trump Building**
- **Trump Palace Condominiums**
- **Trump Parc and Trump Parc East**
- **Trump Park Avenue**
- **Trump World Tower**

===== Other =====
- Trump Bay Street, in Jersey City, New Jersey
- Trump Hollywood, a 41-story condominium tower in Hollywood, Florida
- Trump Park Residences, Yorktown, New York
- Daewoo Trump World, apartment brand in South Korea

==== Former ====
- The Dominick, a hotel condominium complex in New York City formerly called Trump SoHo (name licensing deal ended in 2017)
- Park Tower Stamford, a condominium building previously called Trump Parc Stamford.
- Riverside South, Manhattan (Trump Place), Manhattan (de-branded in November 2016)

==== Cancelled or never completed ====
- Elite Tower, formerly known as Trump Plaza Tower, Ramat Gan, Tel Aviv, Israel
- LSH Hotel, formerly known as Trump Hotel Rio de Janeiro
- Trump condominium/hotel/office/shopping project, Charlotte, North Carolina. Announced in 2007; cancelled a year later, before the start of construction.
- Trump Las Olas Beach Resort, Fort Lauderdale, Florida, United States
- Trump Ocean Resort Baja Mexico
- Trump on the Ocean, Jones Beach, New York
- Trump Tower Europe, a project by TD Trump Deutschland in Stuttgart, Germany
- Trump City, New York City
- Trump Offices Buenos Aires, an office project in Buenos Aires, Argentina.

== Hotels ==
Note: Hotels listed in bold are owned directly by Trump himself or his company, the Trump Organization. The rest are associated through licensing deals.

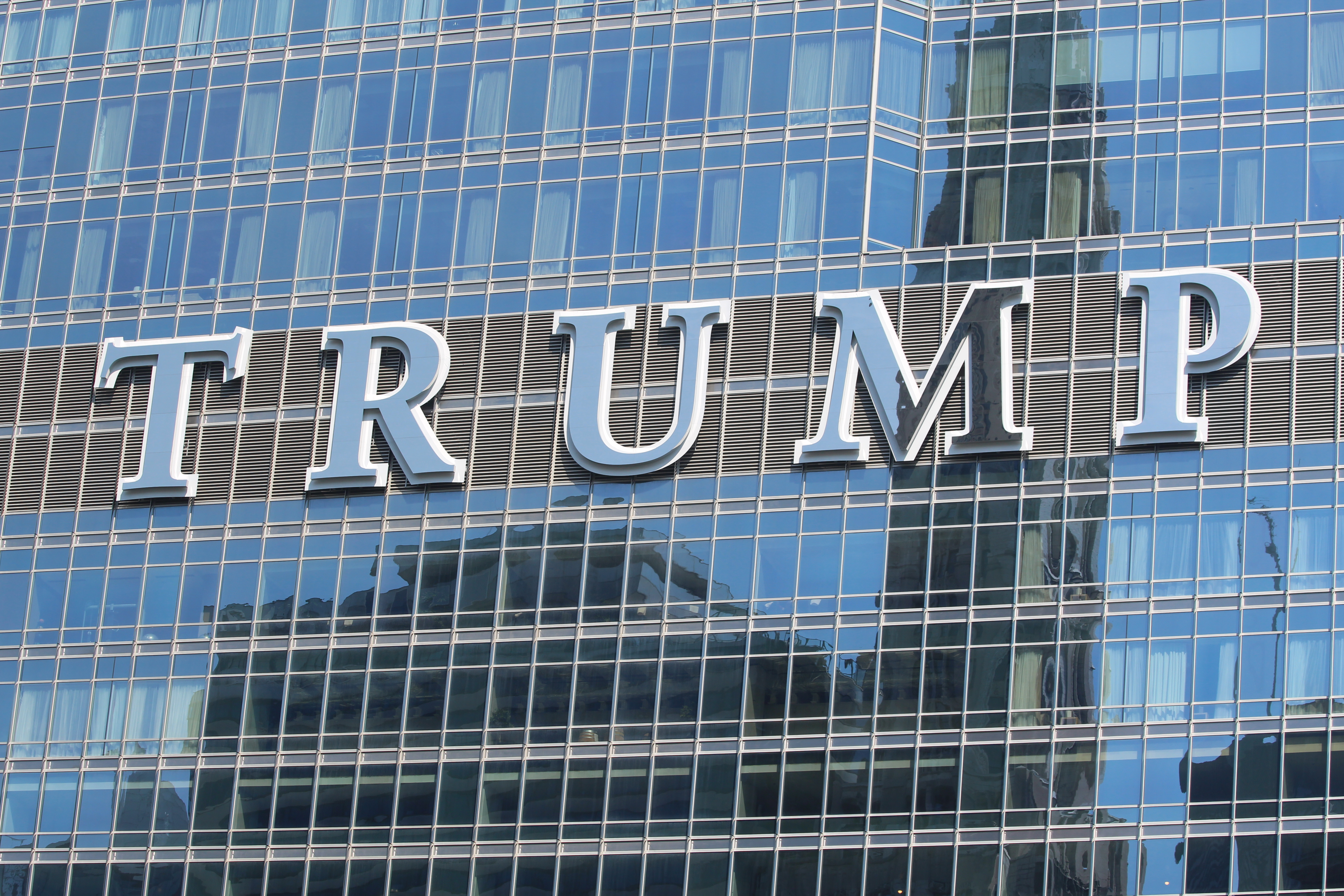
Trump sign on his Chicago Hotel and Tower

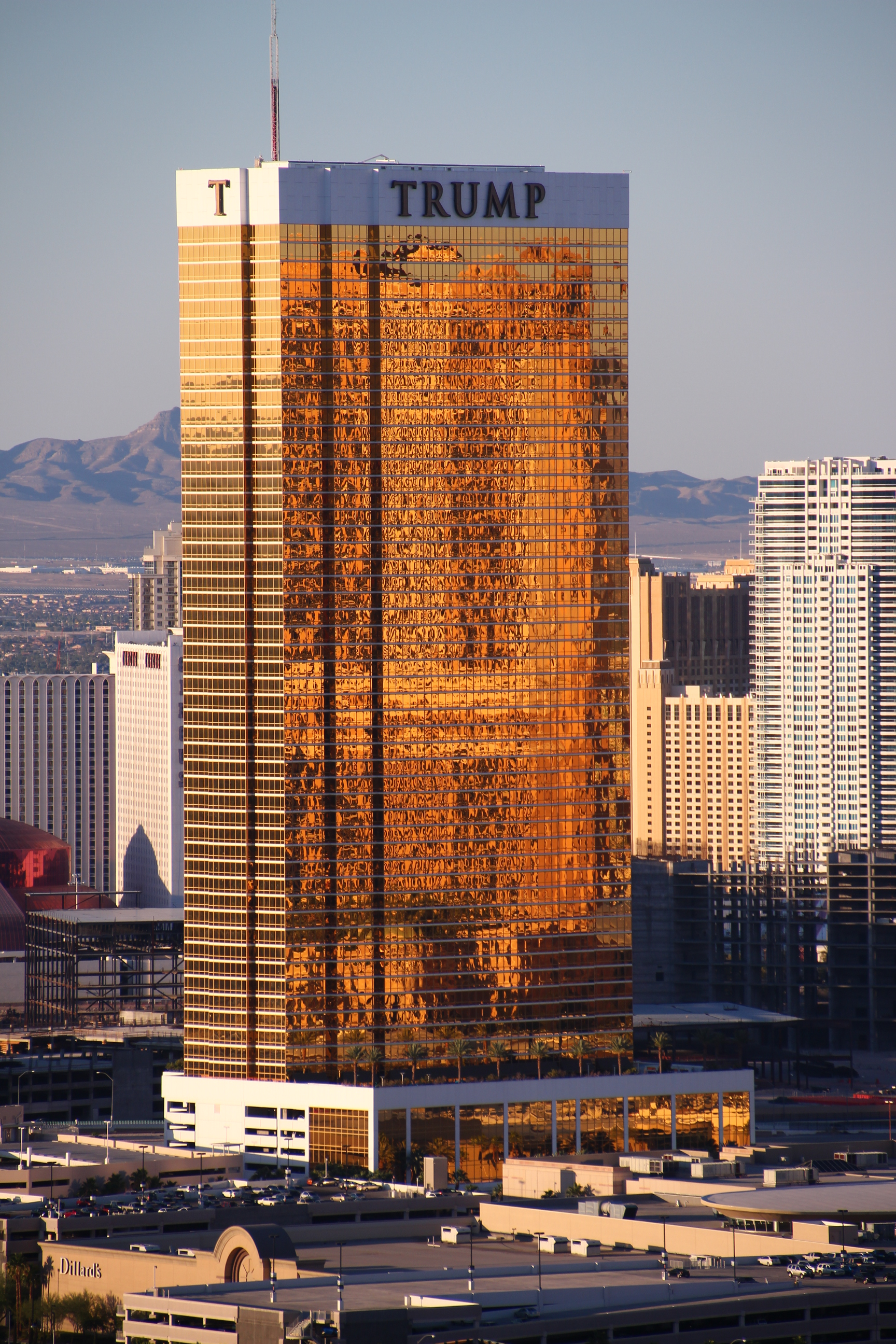
Trump International Hotel – Las Vegas

=== Current ===
- **Trump International Hotel and Tower (Chicago)**
- **Trump International Hotel and Tower (New York City)**
- **Trump International Hotel Las Vegas**, a second tower was going to be built but was cancelled before construction started.

=== Former ===
- The St. Regis Toronto (formerly Trump International Hotel and Tower (Toronto), divested in 2017)
- JW Marriott Panama (formerly Trump International Hotel & Tower (Panama City), licensing deal ended in 2018)
- Paradox Hotel Vancouver (formerly Trump International Hotel and Tower (Vancouver)
- Trump International Hotel Washington, D.C., also known as the Old Post Office Building, sold in May 2022; reopened in June as the Waldorf Astoria Washington DC.
- Ka Laʻi Waikiki Beach Hotel (formerly Trump International Hotel and Tower (Honolulu), divested in February 2024)

=== In development ===
- Trump International Hotel (Oman)
- Trump International Hotel (Hưng Yên)
- Trump International Hotel and Tower (Dubai, United Arab Emirates)

=== Cancelled or never completed ===
- Trump International Hotel & Residence (Phoenix)
- Trump International Hotel & Tower (Baku, Azerbaijan)
- Trump International Hotel and Tower (Belgrade, Serbia)
- Trump International Hotel and Tower (Fort Lauderdale)
- Trump International Hotel and Tower (New Orleans)
- Trump International Hotel & Tower (Bangkok, Thailand)
- Trump International Hotel & Tower (Beijing, China)
- Trump International Hotel & Tower (Guangzhou, China)
- Trump International Hotel & Tower (Shenzhen, China)
- The Palm Trump International Hotel & Tower (Dubai, United Arab Emirates)
- Trump International Hotel & Tower (Doha, Qatar)
- Trump International Hotel & Tower (Jeddah, Saudi Arabia)
- Trump St Andrews Hotel (St Andrews, Scotland)
- Trump International Hotel and Tower (Gold Coast, Australia)

== Golf courses ==
=== United States ===
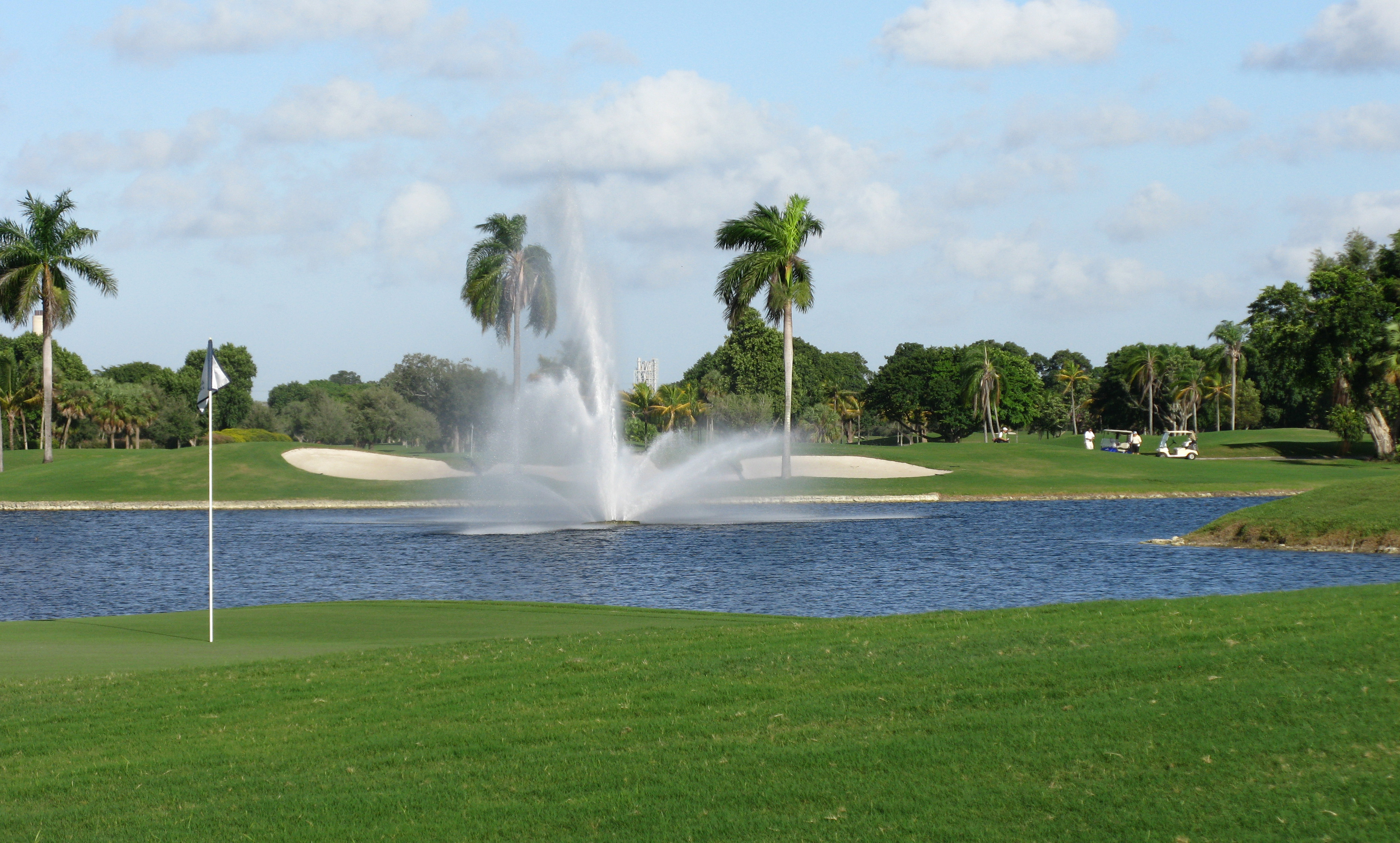
The 18th hole at Trump National Doral

(All owned directly by Trump and/or the Trump Organization)

- Trump National Golf Club
  - Bedminster, New Jersey – used as Trump's "Summer White House" during his presidencies
  - Charlotte, North Carolina
  - Colts Neck, New Jersey
  - Hudson Valley (Hopewell Junction, New York)
  - Jupiter, Florida
  - Los Angeles
  - Philadelphia
  - Washington D.C.
  - Westchester, New York
- Trump International Golf Club (West Palm Beach)
- Trump National Doral Miami (golf club + resort)

=== International ===
- Trump International Golf Club (Dubai)
- Trump World Golf Club (Dubai)
- Trump International Golf Links, Scotland
- Trump International Golf Links and Hotel Ireland
- Trump Turnberry (Scotland)

=== In development ===
- Trump International Resort & Golf Club Bali (Golf Club + Resort + Residences)
- Trump International Resort & Golf Club Lido (Golf Club + Residences), West Java
- Trump International Resort & Golf Club Muscat (Golf Club + Hotel + Residences)
- Trump International Resort & Golf Club Hưng Yên (Golf Club + Hotel + Residences)

=== Former ===
- Trump Golf Links, Ferry Point, New York
- Trump International Golf Club Puerto Rico, Coco Beach, Puerto Rico

=== Cancelled or never completed ===
- Trump at Cap Cana (Dominican Republic) a golf club, resort, residences and estates project
- Trump International Golf Club & Resort Cozumel
- Trump International Golf Club Canouan, The Grenadines
- Trump National Golf Club Emerald Dunes

== Casinos ==
Trump Entertainment Resorts was the casino arm of the Trump Organization. All of its casinos eventually went bankrupt or were divested.

=== Former ===
- Trump Taj Mahal, a casino and hotel on the Atlantic City boardwalk (closed in 2016 and reopened in 2018 as Hard Rock Hotel & Casino Atlantic City)
- Trump Plaza Hotel and Casino, in Atlantic City. Initially a 50/50 partnership with Harrah's, then wholly owned by Trump since 1986. Closed in 2014 and demolished in 2021.
- Trump World's Fair at Trump Plaza in Atlantic City. Operated with its own casino license in a wing of Trump Plaza. Closed in 1999 and demolished in 2000.
- Trump's Castle in Atlantic City (renamed Trump Marina in 1997), sold to Landry's, Inc. in 2011 who renamed it to Golden Nugget Atlantic City in 2011.
- Trump 29 Casino, in Coachella, California, now Spotlight 29 Casino. Former 50/50 partnership with the Twenty-Nine Palms Band of Mission Indians of California; Trump exited the business in 2006.
- Trump Casino in Gary, Indiana, later known as Majestic Star II. Closed in 2021.
- Trump Club Privee Casino, Canouan, Saint Vincent

=== Cancelled or never built ===
- Trump Riverside North Casino and Hotel, St. Louis, United States
- Trump Motor City Casino and Hotel, Detroit, United States
- Trump Flamingo Casino, Kansas City, United States
- Trump Diamondhead Hotel and Casino, Bay St Louis, United States

== Streets/roads/government buildings ==
=== US ===
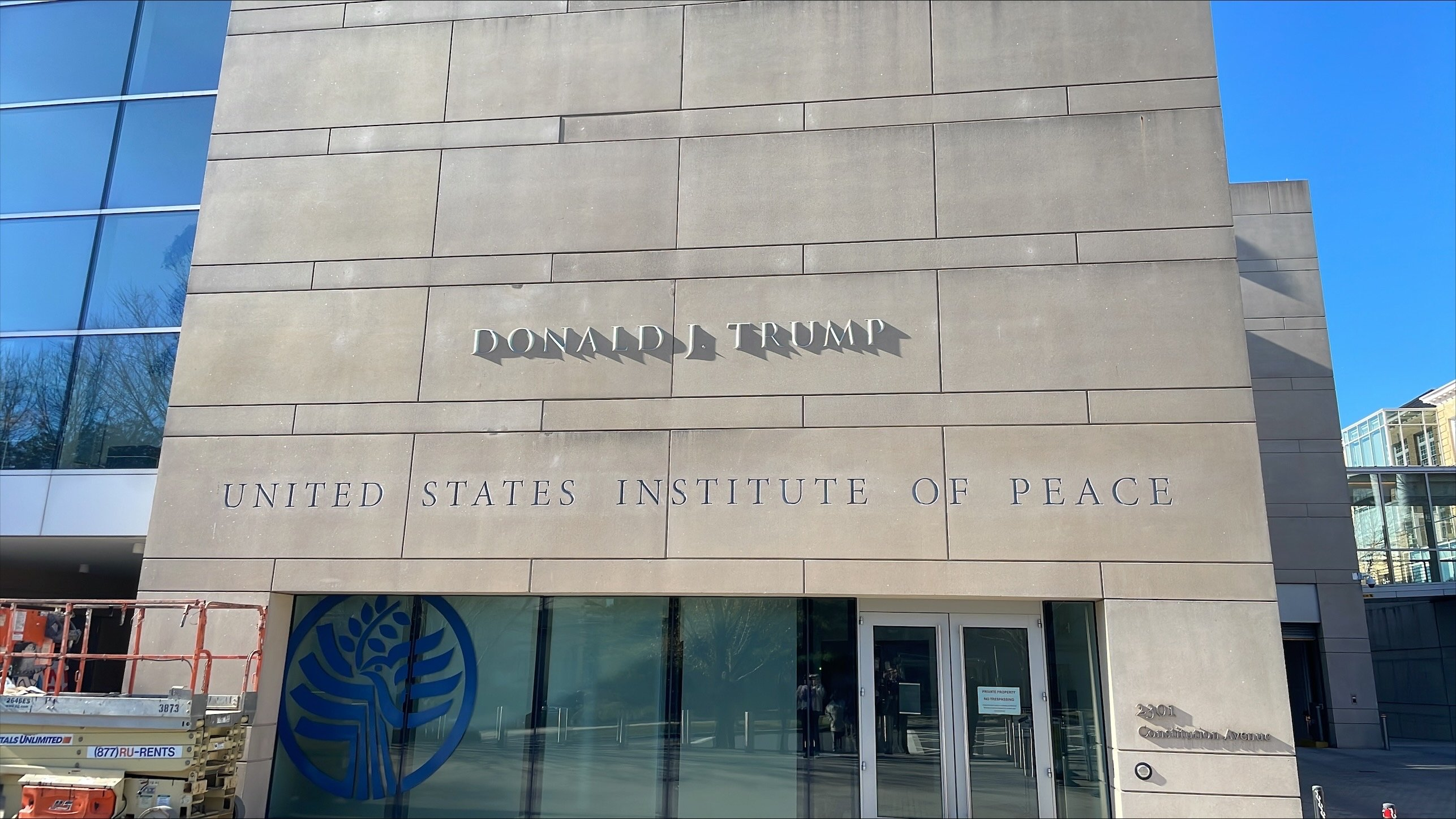
Donald J. Trump Institute of Peace

Sign for President Donald J. Trump International Airport in West Palm Beach

- Donald J. Trump Institute of Peace – national institute for peace in Washington, D.C.
- President Donald J. Trump International Airport, in Palm Beach Florida
- Donald J. Trump State Park, in New York state, on land donated by Trump in 2006
- Trump Drive – Kalispell, Montana
- President Donald J. Trump Highway – a section of U.S. Route 287 in Oklahoma
- The Donald J. Trump Justice Complex – Lyon County, Nevada
- President Donald J. Trump Avenue, in Hialeah, Florida, renamed from Palm Avenue
- President Donald J. Trump Boulevard, in Palm Beach County, Florida, a four-mile (6.4 km) section of Florida State Road 80 and U.S. Route 98
- President Donald J. Trump Highway, Florida
- President Donald J. Trump Bridge, near Douglas Lake, Jefferson County, Tennessee
- President Donald J. Trump Plaza, the grounds of the Kennedy Center buildings

==== Planned or under construction ====
- President Donald J. Trump Ballroom – planned expansion of the East Wing of the White House in Washington, D.C.
- Arc de Trump, planned triumphal arch in Washington, D.C.
- President Donald J. Trump Highway, South Carolina
- Donald J. Trump Bridge, new bridge on I-10 in Alabama over Mobile River

=== International ===
- Trump Avenue - Ottawa, Ontario. Named by the developer of Ottawa's "Central Park" neighborhood around 1997.
- Trump Park - Kiryat Yam, Israel
- Donald Trump Avenue – Hyderabad, Telangana, India. A road adjoining the Consulate General of the United States, Hyderabad was officially renamed and inaugurated as "Donald Trump Avenue" on 23 June 2026 by the Government of Telangana.

==== Planned ====
- Donald Trump Romanian-American Friendship Park – Planned park in Sector 4, Bucharest, Romania.
- Fort Trump – Planned military base in Poland.
- United States Square in honor of President Donald Trump (a.k.a. Donald Trump Square) – Jerusalem, Israel. A town square surrounding the U.S. embassy. Announced in 2018 in honor of Trump for his administration's recognizing of Jerusalem as Israel's capital. However, the name change did not officially take place.

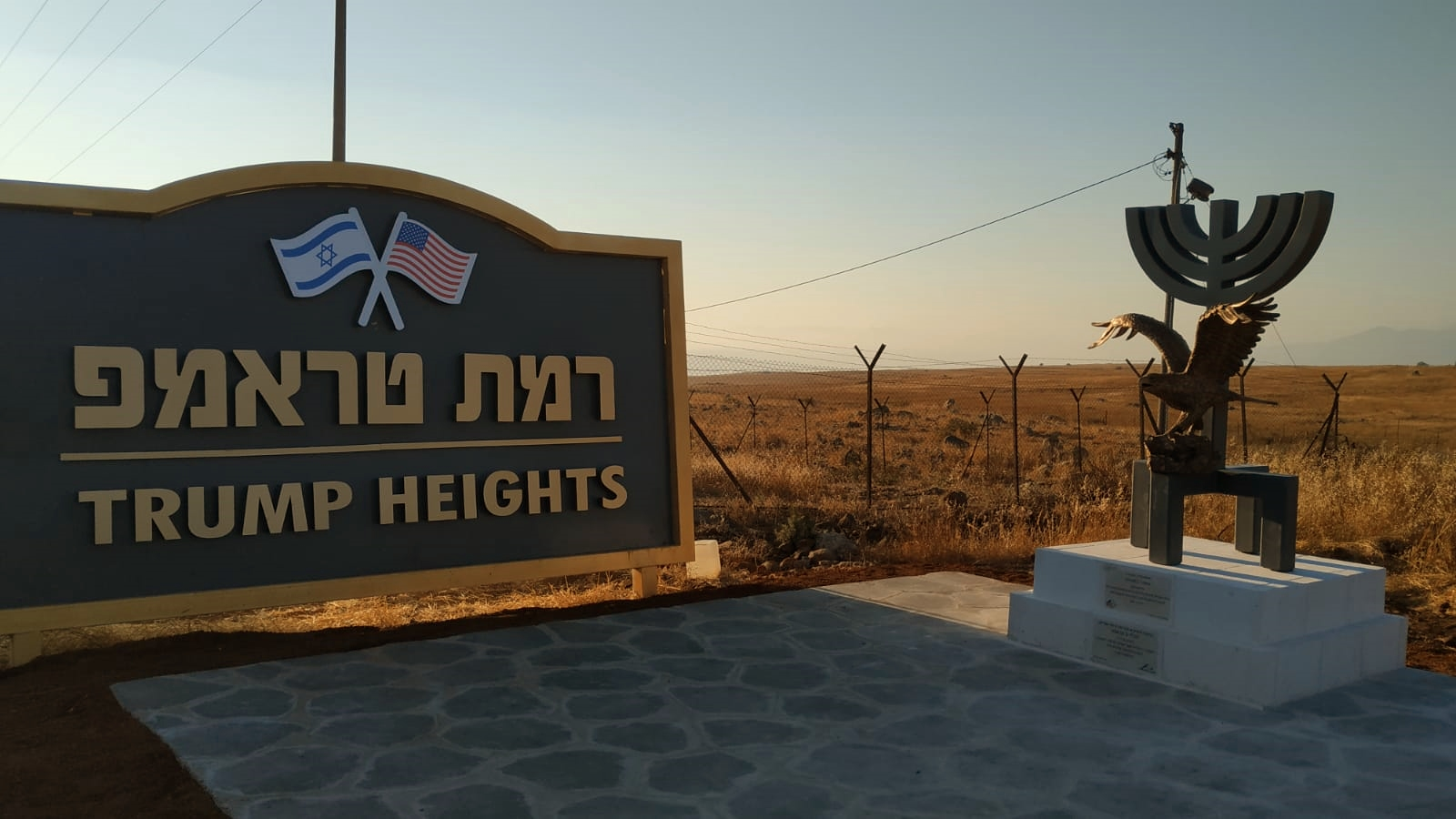
Trump Heights sign and Eagle

- Trump Station in Jerusalem – A proposed train station near the Western Wall in the Old City of Jerusalem.
- Trump Heights – Occupied Golan Heights, a planned Israeli settlement, named in honor of Trump's recognition of the Golan Heights as part of Israel.
- Trump Route for International Peace and Prosperity, means for ground travel between Armenia and Azerbaijan.
- President Donald J. Trump Highway – Planned highway, stretching from Tiznit to Dakhla, in Morocco and Moroccan-occupied Western Sahara.
- Trump Island, new name for Cayo Santa María and location of a planned luxury resort

=== Former ===
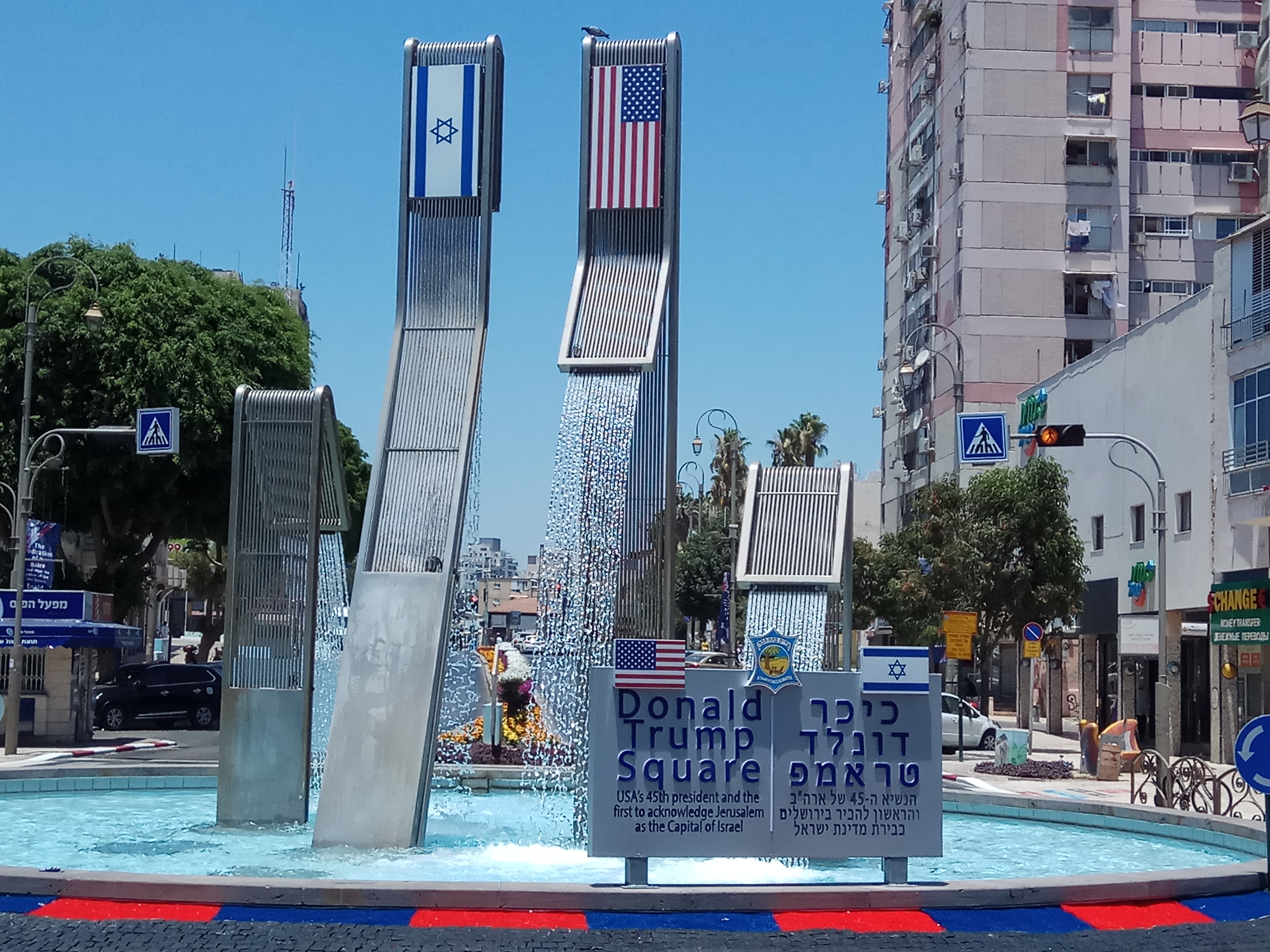
Donald Trump Square, Petah Tikva, Israel, whose name was changed to United States Square in 2023

- Donald Trump Square – Petah Tikva, Israel. The name was changed in 2023 to United States Square.
- Donald J Trump Boulevard – Kamëz, Albania
- Kennedy Center — Briefly renamed the Donald J. Trump and John F. Kennedy Memorial Center for the Performing Arts in 2025, until a court order dictated Trump's name be removed the following year.

Note: Trump Street in the City of London, England, is not named after Donald Trump or his family. It dates from the middle of the 18th century and is named after a former inn, the Trumpeter Tavern.

== Educational institutions ==
- Trump University, owned mostly by Trump (renamed The Trump Entrepreneur Initiative in 2010)

== Arts and media ==
=== Data centers ===
- Donald J. Trump Advanced Energy and Intelligence Campus - 5,800-acre data center near Amarillo, Texas, by Fermi America

=== Telecommunications ===
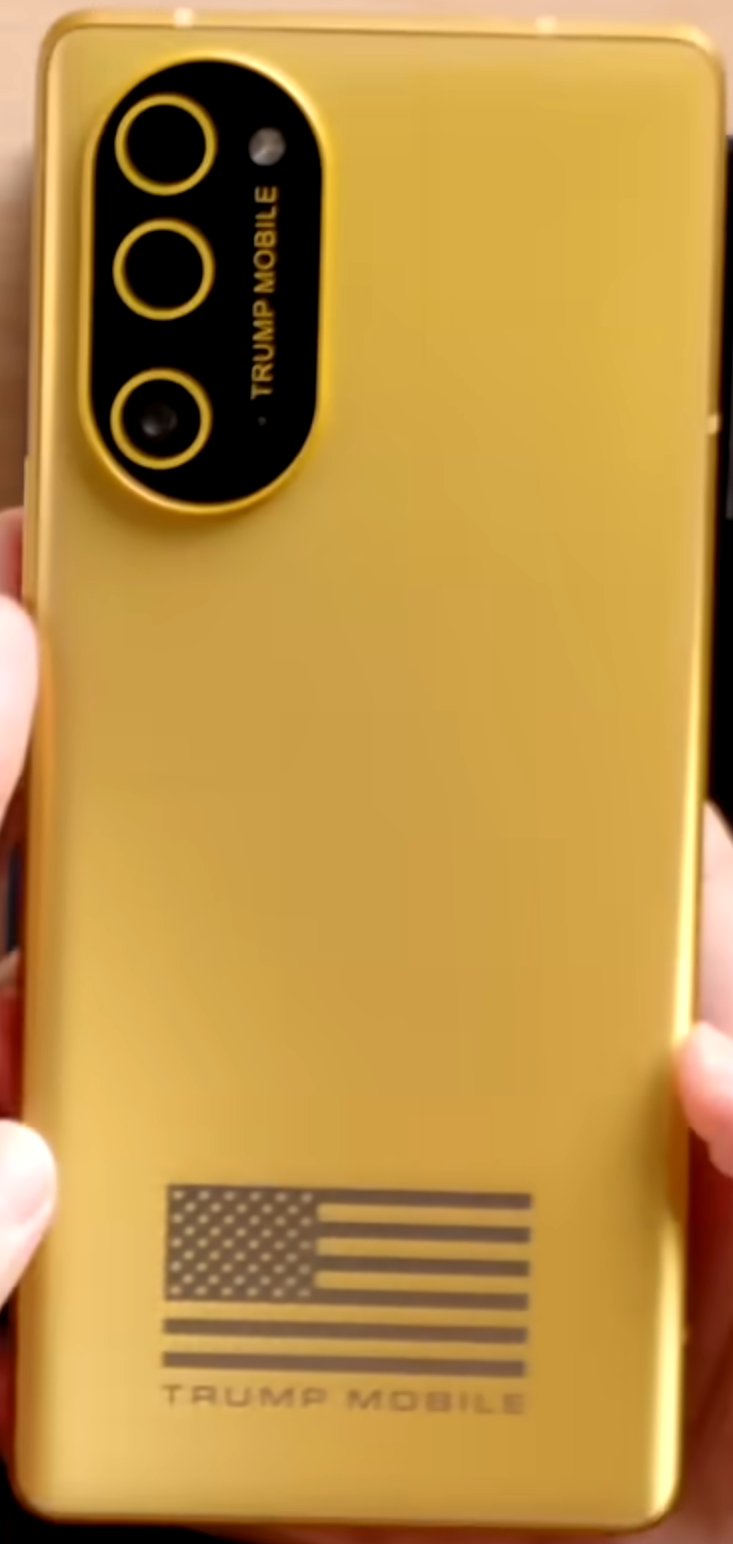
Trump Mobile back side

- **Trump Mobile** – telecommunications company owned by The Trump Organization, founded in 2025.

=== Games ===
- Trump: The Game – a board game initially launched in 1989, with a 2004 re-release
- Donald Trump's Real Estate Tycoon – a 2002 video game by RedCap
- Trump Castle (series) – a gambling video game series launched in 1989 by Capstone
  - Trump Castle II – a sequel to the first Trump Castle video game
- Trumped Up Cards – a parody card game
- Punch the trump – a parody punching game

=== Magazines ===
- Trump magazines include:
  - Trump Style – a free magazine offered at Trump hotel-casinos from 1997 to 2002
  - Trump World – published from 2002 to 2006
  - Trump Magazine – published from 2006 to 2009

=== Social media ===
- Trump Media & Technology Group (TMTG) – social media and technology company that runs the Truth Social social media platform, founded by Trump in 2021.
- TrumporBiden2024 – a Twitch channel dedicated to fictionalized versions of Trump and Joe Biden engaging in comedic political debate.

=== Television ===
Bold indicates direct involvement from Trump himself

- Trump TV – a news channel by White House featuring presidential activities
- **Trump Card** - 1990 game show which was filmed at the then Trump Castle casino, with Trump making a cameo on the first episode
- **Donald J. Trump Presents The Ultimate Merger** – a reality television dating game show that ran for two seasons
- Donald Trump – a segment on Last Week Tonight with John Oliver
- The Trump Show – a BBC documentary series
- You Got Trumped: The First 100 Days – a dark comedy short-format series
- Trump: The Rusical – an episode of RuPaul's Drag Race
- Trump Guy – an episode of Family Guy

=== Music ===
- "Donald Trump" – a 2011 song by Mac Miller
- “Donald Trump” – a 2016 song by Ryan Upchurch
- "The Donald" – a 2016 song by A Tribe Called Quest
- "Donald Trump" – a 2018 song by Lil Nas X
- "Donald Trump (Black Version)" – a song by The Time from the 1990 album Pandemonium
- "Up Like Trump" – a 2015 song by Rae Sremmurd
- "Fuck Donald Trump" - a 2016 song by YG ft. Nipsey Hussle
- "Tronald Trump" – a 2024 song by BabyTron

=== Film ===
- Donald Trump's The Art of the Deal: The Movie – a 2016 parody film
- Trump vs the Illuminati – a 2020 science fiction comedy film
- Trump Unauthorized – a 2005 biographical film
- Trump: The Kremlin Candidate? – a 2017 documentary film
- Trump: What's the Deal? – a 1991 documentary film
- Trumped – a 2017 documentary film
- You've Been Trumped – a 2012 documentary film

=== Books ===
Bold – books written or co-written by Trump himself

- The Day of the Donald – a novel by Andrew Shaffer
- Trump Tower – a novel by Jeffrey Robinson
- **Trump: How to Get Rich** – a non-fiction book by Donald Trump
- **Trump: The Art of the Deal** – a non-fiction book by Donald Trump and Tony Schwartz
- **Trump: The Art of the Comeback** – a non-fiction book by Donald Trump and Kate Bohner
- **Trump: Surviving at the Top** – a non-fiction book by Donald Trump and Charles Leerhsen
- Trump 101 – a non-fiction book by Meredith McIver

== Food and drink ==
=== Current ===
- Trump Winery, a vineyard in Virginia, acquired by Trump in 2011
- Trumptini, a Bacardi-based cocktail, and the signature cocktail of the Trump International Beach Resort in Miami, Florida

=== Former ===
- Trump Footlong
- Trump Golden Ale renamed Chinga Tu Pelo (literally “Fuck your hair”) beer
- Trump Ice, a water distribution company opened in 2004 and no longer served at Trump properties as of 2010.
- Trump Steaks
- Trump Vodka

== Sales/retail/side ventures ==
=== Current ===
- Trump Sales and Leasing (residential sales)
- Trump International Realty (residential and commercial real estate brokerage firm)
- Trump Restaurants (located in Trump Tower and consisting of Trump Buffet, Trump Catering, Trump Ice Cream Parlor, and Trump Bar)
- Donald Trump, The Fragrance, released in 2004.
- SUCCESS by Donald Trump (second fragrance launched by the Trump Organization and the Five Star Fragrance Company, released in March 2012)
- Trump Collectable Cards, NFT (released in Dec 2022)
- Trump sneakers, the "Never Surrender High-Top" sneaker was unveiled in 2024 at Sneaker Con

=== Former ===
- Donald J. Trump Foundation – charitable foundation shut down in 2018 due to legal issues
- Donald J. Trump Signature Collection, a line of menswear launched at Macy's in 2004, and involved in a lawsuit and subsequent trial. Discontinued in 2015, after comments Trump made about Mexican immigrants.
- GoTrump.com, a travel booking website
- Tour de Trump, a bicycle race held in 1989 and 1990.
- The Trump Network, a multi-level marketing company that sold vitamins
- Trump Office, a line of executive office chairs launched in 2007 for Staples Inc
- Select By Trump (line of coffee drinks)
- Trump Drinks (energy drink for the Israeli and Palestinian markets)
- Trump Chocolate
- Trump Home, an upscale furniture line
- Trump Productions (television production company)
- Trump Institute
- Trump Model Management
- Trump Shuttle, an airline
- Trump Mortgage
- Trump Steakhouse
- Trump Sports & Entertainments

== Transportation ==
Bold indicates owned by Trump or the Trump Organization

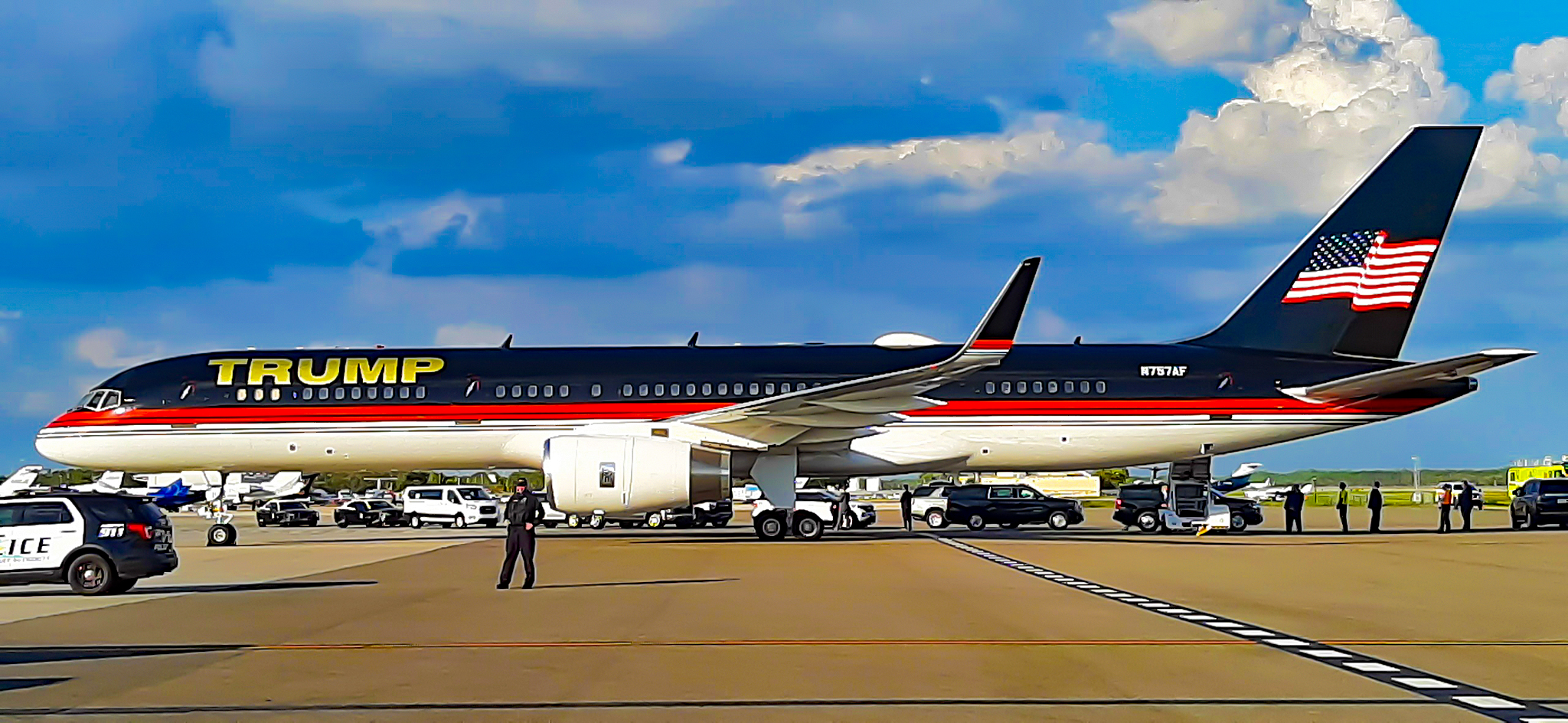
Trump's personal airplane – dubbed "Trump Force One" since his entry into politics

- **Trump Force One** – the nickname given by the media to Trump's personal aircraft, a Boeing 757-200ER. In December 2016 it received the callsign Tyson 1.
- Trump Princess – superyacht that has since been renamed

== Species ==
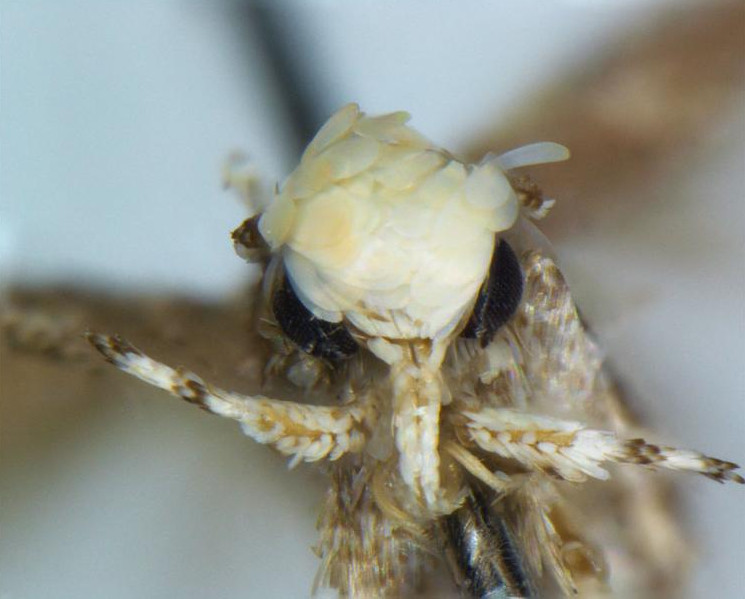
Neopalpa donaldtrumpi was named in 2016 because the yellowish-white scales on its head are reminiscent of Trump's hairstyle.

- Neopalpa donaldtrumpi, a species of moth with distinctive yellowish-white scales covering the head.
- Tetragramma donaldtrumpi, a species of fossil sea urchin.
- Pliotoxaster donaldtrumpi, a species of fossil sea urchin
- Dermophis donaldtrumpi, a proposed name for a putative new species of amphibian that is blind; not confirmed as a new species yet, nor published.

== Tributes and homages ==
Entities created and named after Trump specifically to honor or pay respect to him:

=== Public policy ===
- Donroe Doctrine – US foreign policy doctrine by Donald J. Trump
- TrumpRx – a prescription drug website
- Trump account – a type of investment account
- Trump Gold Card – immigration initiative
- Trumpcare – healthcare policy

=== Military ===
- Boeing F-47 – a sixth-generation fighter jet under development for the United States Air Force. The "47" designation is a tribute to the WWII-era Republic P-47 Thunderbolt, while also referencing Trump's position as the 47th president.
- Trump-class battleship – proposed battleship class of the US Navy.
- USS Donald J. Trump, planned aircraft carrier with designation CVN-81

=== Currency ===
Trump $1 commemorative by US Mint

- $1 Trump coin – Commemorative coin by US Mint.
- $250 bill featuring Trump – Proposed banknote.
- $Trump, cryptocurrency

=== Locations ===
- Donald J. Trump Presidential Library – a presidential library administered by the National Archives and Records Administration
- Trump House, support hub in Pennsylvania

=== Statues and depictions ===
- Don Colossus – 15 ft golden statue by Alan Cottrill installed at Doral
- Trump Buddha – a statue by Hong Jinshi

=== Novelty items ===
- Donald J. Trump Presidential Bronze Medal – Trump Medal by US Mint
- Trumpy Bear – a stuffed teddy bear featuring a tuft of hair in the style of Trump's hairdo, and wearing a red tie
- Trumpy Trout – a mounted animatronic talking fish head (which says fish pun versions of Trump's famous catchphrases) featuring a tuft of hair in the style of Trump's hairdo wearing a tie

=== Events ===
- Trump-a-palooza – 2026 GOP Convention in Dallas
- Namaste Trump – A ceremonial function to welcome him in his official trip to India in 2020.

== Satirical and critical ==
=== Statues/depictions ===
- Donald Trump baby balloon – a 6-metre-tall (20 ft) balloon depicting Trump as a baby in a diaper with a mobile phone
- Dump Trump – a satirical British statue
- God Emperor Trump – a satirical Italian sculpture
- Statue of Donald Trump – a satirical statue in Slovenia
- Trump Statue Initiative
- Trump Buddha
- Trump Chicken
- Trumpy the Rat
- The Donald J. Trump Enduring Flame

=== Novelty items ===
- Trump toilet paper – launched in Mexico in 2017 with the slogan "softness without borders"

== Political parties ==
- Trumpet of Patriots – Australian political party whose name intentionally references Trump
- TRUMP – Belgian political party whose name is a backronym for Trump

== Creatures ==
- Donald Trump – A buffalo from Bangladesh

== See also ==
- Branding of United States government programs and facilities after Donald Trump
- List of places named for George Washington
- List of places named for Thomas Jefferson
- List of places named for James Monroe
- List of places named for Andrew Jackson
- List of places named for James K. Polk
- List of things named after Ronald Reagan
- List of things named after George H. W. Bush
- List of things named after Bill Clinton
- List of things named after George W. Bush
- List of things named after Barack Obama
- List of things named after Joe Biden
- List of educational institutions named after presidents of the United States
- Donald Trump in popular culture
