= Trump International Hotel =

Trump International Hotel may refer to:

== Current ==
- Trump International Hotel and Tower (Chicago)
- Trump International Hotel and Tower (New York City)
- Trump International Hotel Las Vegas

== Former ==
- The St. Regis Toronto, Canada, originally the Trump International Hotel and Tower Toronto (2012–2017)
- JW Marriott Panama, originally the Trump International Hotel and Tower Panama (2011-2018)
- Paradox Hotel Vancouver, originally the Trump International Hotel and Tower Vancouver, Canada (2017–2020)
- Old Post Office (Washington, D.C.), formerly known as Trump International Hotel Washington, D.C. (2016–2022)
- Ka Laʻi Waikiki Beach Hotel, Hawaii, formerly known as Trump International Hotel and Tower Honolulu (2009–2024)

== Renamed before opening ==
- Conrad Fort Lauderdale, Florida, US, originally announced as the Trump International Hotel and Tower Fort Lauderdale
- The Ritz-Carlton Baku Hotel, Azerbaijan, originally announced as the Trump International Hotel & Tower Baku

== Canceled or unfinished ==
- Trump International Hotel & Residence, Phoenix, Arizona, US
- Trump International Hotel and Tower (Dubai)
- Trump International Hotel and Tower (New Orleans), Louisiana, US

== See also ==
- The Dominick, in SoHo, New York City (formerly the Trump SoHo)
- List of things named after Donald Trump § Real estate
- Trump Plaza (disambiguation)
- Trump Tower (disambiguation)
