= Trumptini =

Cocktail made with rum, Cointreau and cranberry juice

- Type: Cocktail
- Ingredients: 1 ¼ ounces Bacardi Limon, ¾ ounce Cointreau; 2 ounces sour mix; Splash of cranberry juice
- Base spirit: Bacardi Limon, Cointreau
- Standard drinkware: Cocktail glass
- Standard garnish: Lemon peel shaped like a "T"; salmon caviar
- Served: Straight up
- Preparation: Straight: Pour all ingredients into mixing glass with ice cubes. Shake well. Strain in chilled martini cocktail glass, with a salt rim. Garnish with a "T"-shaped slice of lemon peel and a scoop of salmon caviar

The Trumptini is a cold, cranberry-flavoured cocktail made with Bacardi Limon, Cointreau, sour mix and cranberry juice. It is traditionally served in a Rokz salt-rimmed martini glass, and garnished with scoop of premium red Atlantic salmon caviar, and a T-shaped slice of lemon peel.

While not a true martini, the word is a portmanteau of the name Trump (named after Donald Trump) and the word martini.

== Origins ==
The Trumptini is the signature cocktail of the Trump International Beach Resort in Miami, Florida. It is named after the hotel's owner Donald Trump in honour of the opening of the hotel in 1992, despite the fact that Donald Trump himself is teetotal.

In 2008, the Trumptini was awarded as "Best Signature Drink" by the Miami New Times.

The "Trumptini" is a trademarked brand. In June 2016, ownership of the Trumptini trademark was transferred from the Trump Organization to Drinks Americas.

== Variations ==
Unofficial variations of the Trumptini have been served at various locations across the world.

During the 2016 US presidential election campaign, The Rustic restaurant in Houston, Texas served a version of the Trumptini which used vodka instead of Bacardi, and used gold flakes instead of lemon peel.

In 2018, Maxwells Steakhouse in Covent Garden, London, England created a "Stormy Trumptini" cocktail to commemorate President Trump's state visit to the United Kingdom. The Stormy Trumptini was similar to a porn star martini, made with vanilla-flavoured vodka, Passoã, passion fruit juice, and passion fruit puree. The cocktail was garnished with candy floss to imitate Trump's distinctive hairstyle, and was served alongside a shot glass of prosecco and Grenadine, which was meant to resemble the "nuclear button".

=== As an internet meme ===
In April 2020, during a press conference on the COVID-19 pandemic, President Trump appeared to ask whether injecting disinfectants into the body could be an effective cure for coronavirus, perhaps sarcastically. Trump's comments were ridiculed online and formed the basis of several memes, with internet users creating fake recipes for a Trumptini cocktail, consisting of mixes of various bleaches and other disinfectants, and garnished with Tide Pods.

== See also ==
- Vodka martini
- List of cocktails
- List of things named after Donald Trump
