= Trump House (disambiguation) =

Trump House may refer to:

- Trump House, a house in Latrobe, Pennsylvania, used to promote Donald Trump's presidential campaigns
- 85-15 Wareham Place, Donald Trump's childhood home in New York City
- Edwin Trump House, a historic house in Fenton, Michigan
- Mar-a-Lago, a resort in West Palm Beach, Florida which has served as Donald Trump's primary residence since 2019

== See also ==
- List of things named after Donald Trump
