= Trump Plaza =

Trump Plaza may refer to:

== Buildings ==
=== United States ===
- Trump Plaza (New York City), New York, first building named Trump Plaza.
- Trump Plaza Hotel and Casino, a former building in Atlantic City, New Jersey
- Trump Plaza (New Rochelle), New York
- Trump Plaza (Jersey City), New Jersey
- Trump Plaza (West Palm Beach), former name of The Plaza, Florida
- Trump Plaza and Riverwalk, the park surrounding Trump International Hotel and Tower in Chicago

=== Elsewhere ===
- Trump Plaza Tower, a former planned tower, Israel

== See also ==
- Trump (disambiguation)
- Trump Tower (disambiguation)
- Trump International Hotel (disambiguation)
