= Trump (disambiguation) =

Donald Trump (born 1946) is the president of the United States.

Trump or TRUMP may also refer to:

== Arts and entertainment ==
=== Games ===
- Trump (card games), a playing card given an ad-hoc high rank
- Court piece or trumps, a trick-taking card game related to whist
- Trump: The Game, a 1989 board game

=== Film ===
- Trump: The Kremlin Candidate?, a 2017 British television film
- Trump: What's the Deal?, an American documentary first screened in 1991

=== Literature ===
- Trump (magazine), a 1957 American humor magazine
- Trump (series), a Japanese stage, manga and anime series since 2009
- Trump: The Art of the Deal, a 1987 book by Donald Trump and Tony Schwartz
- Trump: Surviving at the Top, a 1990 book by Donald Trump and Charles Leerhsen
- Trump: The Deals and the Downfall, a 1992 biography by Wayne Barrett
- Trump: The Art of the Comeback, a 1997 book by Donald Trump and Kate Bohner

== Businesses ==
- The Trump Organization, a conglomerate formed in the 1970s
- The Trump Group, a real estate developer founded in 1982 by Eddie and Jules Trump
- Trump Media & Technology Group, founded in 2021
- Trump Mobile, founded in 2025
- $Trump, a 2025 cryptocurrency meme coin

== Domesticated animals ==
- Trump (dog), a pug owned by English painter William Hogarth
- The Trump (horse), an Australian racehorse

== People ==
- Trump (surname), including a list of people and fictional characters with the name
  - Trump family, an American dynasty including Donald Trump
- Trump (gamer), or Jeffrey Shih (born 1987), streamer-competitor in Hearthstone

== Places ==
- Trump, Colorado, US
- Trump, Maryland, US
- Trump Islands, Antarctica
- Trump Islands (Newfoundland and Labrador), Canada
- Trump Street, City of London, UK

== Transport ==
- HMS Trump (P333), a 1944–1969 British submarine
- Trump-class battleship, a proposed US Navy ship class
- Trump Shuttle (callsign: TRUMP), a 1989–1992 airline
- USCGC William Trump, a US Coast Guard cutter, launched 2014
- Tribal Refit and Update Modernization Program (TRUMP), a modernization of Royal Canadian Navy's Iroquois-class destroyer

== Other uses ==
- TRUMP (political party), a Belgian Francophone party
- Trump (slang), a colloquialism for flatulence
- Jew's harp (or trump), a lamellophone instrument

== See also ==
- Tromp (disambiguation)
- Trumpf, a machine tool company
- Trumped (disambiguation)
- Trumpet (disambiguation)
- Trumpy (disambiguation)
- Trump card (disambiguation)
- Trump House (disambiguation)
- The Trump Organization, owned by Donald Trump
- Trump Plaza (disambiguation)
- Trump Tower (disambiguation)
- Trumpism, a political movement of Donald Trump
- Van Trump (disambiguation)
