= Trumping =

Trumping may refer to:

- Ruff (cards), playing a trump card
- Flatulence, breaking wind

== See also ==
- Conflict escalation
- Trump (card games)
- Trump (disambiguation)
