= Roman Sharf =

Russian-American businessman

- Born: May 9, 1975 (age 51); Soviet Union
- Education: Pennsylvania State University (BA)
- Occupations: Entrepreneur, business executive, Army veteran

Roman Sharf (born 9 May 1975) is a Russian-American jewelry retailer and auctioneer. Sharf is recognized for his role in the gray market, dealing with luxury watches, jewelry and accessories.

== Early life ==
Sharf was born in the Soviet Union in the 1970s, later moving to the United States in 1998. He attended Penn State University, where he studied Computer Information Systems, and after his studies enlisted in the U.S. Army.

== Career ==
After his military service, Sharf initially pursued a career in finance, becoming a vice president in Deutsche Bank, and later moved to the luxury goods market, focusing on watches, jewelry and other valuable collectibles and in the early 2000s, established the luxury jewelry company Luxury Bazaar. The platform found success in the gray luxury market, and in 2024, Sharf announced plans to sell the company, valued at $130 million. He also launched a private wholesale platform designed specifically for dealers to trade luxury timepieces. Luxury Bazaar have faced criticism, particularly surrounding doing business of luxury items outside the official retail channel, his approach has drawn criticisms for providing items at lower prices than traditional retail stores. In 2024, Luxury Bazaar made a contribution of a Rolex Air-King watch to the WatchPro Awards. Sharf purchased the auctioned pair of Never Surrender High-Top.
