= Dermophis donaldtrumpi =

Proposed species of amphibian

Dermophis donaldtrumpi is a name proposed for a putative new species of caecilian – a nearly blind serpentine amphibian – to be named after Donald Trump. It was originally discovered in Panama and though the name was proposed in 2018, it has yet to be confirmed as a new species; as of 2024, the binomial name and description of the species has not been formally published. It was given its name after the Rainforest Trust held an auction for the naming rights. The company EnviroBuild won the auction and proposed naming the species in protest against Trump's environmental policies and views.

== Description ==
Dermophis donaldtrumpi is about 10 centimetres (4 in) long, and like all caecilians it has a worm-like appearance with a smooth and shiny skin rich in mucous glands. This order of amphibians are either aquatic or fossorial, with D. donaldtrumpi belonging to the latter type, living almost entirely underground. It is nearly blind, with its reduced eyes only able to detect light and dark, so it uses a pair of tentacles, unique to caecilians, near its mouth in order to find prey. The offspring feed on an extra layer of skin produced by the mother (dermatotrophy), which provide them with both nutrients and microbes necessary for a healthy microbiome.

According to the Rainforest Trust, amphibians such as D. donaldtrumpi are vulnerable to extinction due to being exceptionally sensitive to the results of global warming.

== Naming ==
In December 2018, the Rainforest Trust completed an auction of naming rights for twelve newly discovered species of South American plants and animals, the money going towards the conservation of the species' habitats. The sustainable building materials company EnviroBuild paid $25,000 for the right to name the new amphibian.

Aidan Bell, owner of EnviroBuild, stated that he named the species after Trump to raise awareness of Trump's policies on climate change and the danger that he sees those policies pose to the survival of many species. Referring to the creature's "rudimentary eyes which can only detect light or dark", Bell said that "Capable of seeing the world only in black and white, Donald Trump has claimed that climate change is a hoax by the Chinese." Daily Mirror also linked the creature's limited sight as "a feature that inspired it[s] name." According to The Washington Post, "The naming choice highlights the president's dismal approval ratings worldwide and is clearly designed to belittle him."

Bell also related the caecilian's instincts when nurturing young to what he claims as Trump's nepotism: "The Dermophis genus grows an extra layer of skin which their young use their teeth to peel off and eat, a behaviour known as dermatrophy. [sic] As a method of ensuring [his] children survive in life Donald Trump prefers granting them high roles in the Oval Office." Dermatotrophy, a form of parental care in which the young feed on the skin of its mother, has been scientifically observed in other species of caecilians, such as Boulengerula taitana.

EnviroBuild further connected the amphibian's nature to burrow underground with more of the president's policies: "Burrowing its head underground helps Donald Trump when avoiding scientific consensus on anthropogenic climate change". The company also noted that he had "appointed several energy lobbyists to the Environment Agency, where their job is to regulate the energy industry."

The process of naming this species has garnered significant controversy among researchers and conservationists; some have pointed out the conservation benefits of the money donated to name the species, while others have criticized the idea of donating to name a new species, as many of the donors had no involvement with the studies undertaken to describe the species. In particular, North Carolina Museum of Natural Sciences researcher Christian Kammerer sees the facetious name of the amphibian as "just mean to the creature".

== See also ==
- List of things named after Donald Trump § Species
- List of organisms named after famous people (born 1925–1949)
- Syllipsimopodi bideni
