= Trumpy =

Trumpy may refer to:

== People with the surname ==
- Bjørn Trumpy (1900–1974), Norwegian physicist
- Bob Trumpy (1945–2025), American football player and broadcaster
- Rudolf Trümpy (1921–2009), Swiss geologist

== Others ==
- Trumpy, an extraterrestrial creature in the 1983 film The Pod People
- Trumpy, a character in the 2006 film Idlewild
- John Trumpy & Sons, later name of John H. Mathis & Company

== See also ==
- Trump (disambiguation)
