= Never Surrender High-Top =

Brand of sneaker by Donald Trump

- Type: Shoe
- Inception: February 17, 2024; 2 years ago
- Manufacturer: 45Footwear
- Website: gettrumpsneakers.com

The Never Surrender High-Top is a high-top sneaker brand sold by United States president Donald Trump.

== Release and promotion ==
Trump announced the Never Surrender High-Top on February 17, 2024, at Sneaker Con in Philadelphia; his appearance was met with a mixture of applause and disdain. Debuting at US$399 as a limited-edition offering of one thousand made-to-order pairs, the Never Surrender High-Top appeared on gettrumpsneakers.com, selling out within hours; the website features cologne, perfume, and two additional sneakers. The sneaker was manufactured by 45Footwear, who licensed Trump's image from CIC Ventures, and will ship in July.

Trump autographed at least ten pairs of the Never Surrender High-Top. One pair was sold for US$9,000 to Roman Sharf, a watch dealer. Sharf was invited to Trump International Golf Club after posting about the sneakers online.

== Design ==
The Never Surrender High-Top is a high-top sneaker bearing similarities to the sneakers in the Nike Air Force series. The sneaker's quarter, tip, vamp, tongue, shoelaces, and heel are gilded, with the flag of the United States adorning the collar and sock lining. The midsole is white while the outsole is red. It has been suggested by the website The Fashion Law that the design of the shoe may infringe on a trademark held by Christian Louboutin.

== Reception ==
=== Political response ===
Michael Tyler, Joe Biden's campaign communications director, stated that Trump's sneakers were the "closest he'll get to any Air Force 1s ever again for the rest of his life".

Gun control advocate David Hogg purchased the domain shoptrumpsneakers.com, redirecting the website to The Shotline, a service allowing users to send an automated call to members of Congress, urging gun reform using the voice of mass shooting victims through generative audio.

=== Fashion industry response ===
Fashion industry writer Derek Guy wrote that the promotion was "embarrassing", comparing French president Emmanuel Macron and British prime minister Rishi Sunak's formality to the event.

=== Media response ===
The Never Surrender High-Top was satirized in a Saturday Night Live sketch entitled "Trump Sneakers". In the sketch—a fictitious film trailer for White Men Can Trump, host Shane Gillis portrays an office worker who discovers the sneakers, granting him the ability to mislead those around him of his accomplishments. In a Weekend Update segment, Michael Che quipped that the Never Surrender High-Top is worn by "the guy getting dragged off your flight".

Fox News contributor Raymond Arroyo suggested on The Big Weekend Show that African American voters would vote for Trump in the 2024 United States presidential election because "they're into sneakers".

== See also ==
- Trump Steaks
- Trump Vodka
