= Trump card =

Trump card(s) may refer to:

== Cards ==
- Trump (card games), an ad-hoc highly ranked playing card
- Trump cards, or Major Arcana, a suit in tarot
- Trump Cards, 2022 non-fungible tokens featuring Donald Trump

== Film and television ==
- Trump Card (2009 film), a Bollywood thriller
- Trump Card (2020 film), an American documentary
- Trump Card (game show), a 1990 American show
- The Trump Card, a 2007 Irish game show
- The Trump Card (film), a 1942 French crime drama

== Government ==
- Trump Gold Card, a type of United States visa

== Literature ==
- The Trump Card (book), a 2009 self-help guide by Ivanka Trump
- Bomb Queen VIII: Trump Card, a 2021 Bomb Queen comic book

== See also ==
- Top Trumps, a series of children's card games
- Trump (disambiguation) § Games
