= Trump International, Vietnam =

Proposed golf and residential development

The Trump International Hung Yen is a planned golf and residential development in Vietnam in partnership between The Trump Organization, IDG (independent from IDG Capital), and Kinh Bac City Development Holding Corporation (KBC) which is chaired by Đặng Thành Tâm. The Trump-branded project is one of 23 to be developed outside the United States during the second Trump presidency. The project, if completed, "would be one of the biggest in the Trump Organization’s portfolio (...) covering an area as big as Newark Liberty International Airport".

== History ==
For the development, similarly to other Trump-branded projects, "the Trump Organization picked local partners with limited experience or checkered histories to develop the sites". While KBC has been a "FDI magnet, hosting global giants like Foxconn, Luxshare, Goertek (Apple partners), and LG across its industrial parks", its hotel projects have a history of not been developed and the project's head Charles Boyd-Bowman has "no apparent experience in managing hotel projects" and "was once accused of corporate tax fraud in the U.K." although the case was dropped.

In May 2021, the project broke ground which was attended by Phạm Minh Chính and Eric Trump.

A letter reportedly "explicitly stated that the project required special support from the top ranks of the Vietnamese government because it was “receiving special attention from the Trump administration and President Donald Trump personally", with the project described as "unprecedented, illegal and unfair".

In November 2025, there was reportedly "little sign of activity on the land".

The development has sparked corruption allegations, and "On his most recent financial-disclosure form, Trump reported five million dollars in initial income from licensing his name to the project".

== See also ==
- Corruption in Vietnam
- United States–Vietnam relations
- Tariffs in the second Trump administration § Vietnam
- Second Trump presidency § Ethics
