= Tetragramma =

Tetragramma Temporal range: Oxfordian–Turonian

Scientific classification
- Kingdom: Animalia
- Phylum: Echinodermata
- Class: Echinoidea
- Order: †Phymosomatoida
- Family: †Diplopodiidae
- Genus: †Tetragramma; L. Agassiz, 1838

Type species
- Tetragramma variolare (Brongniart, 1822)

Synonyms
- Acanthechinopsis Gregory, 1906

Extinct genus of sea urchins

Tetragramma is a genus of fossil sea urchins known from the Upper Jurassic (Oxfordian) to the Upper Cretaceous (Turonian).

== Species ==
Species include:

- Tetragramma antsingyensis Lambert, 1936
- Tetragramma basabensis Vaziri & Arab, 2013
- Tetragramma besairiei Lambert, 1933
- Tetragramma bosei Jones, 1938
- Tetragramma cornueli Corroy, 1925
- Tetragramma depressum Vaziri & Arab, 2013
- Tetragramma donaldtrumpi Thompson, 2016
- Tetragramma giganteum Lambert, 1935
- Tetragramma hourcqi Collignon, 1950
- Tetragramma pomeraniae Kongiel, 1957
- Tetragramma tafermense Lambert, 1931
- Tetragramma tetratuberculatus Vaziri & Arab, 2013
- Tetragramma variolare (Brongniart, 1822)
