= Trump Ocean Resort Baja Mexico =

Trump Ocean Baja Mexico The Spa Tower
- Interactive map of the Trump Ocean Baja Mexico The Spa Tower area

General information
- Status: Abandoned
- Type: residential, hotel
- Location: Playas de Tijuana, Tijuana
- Coordinates: 32.469467°N 117.118065°W
- Construction started: 2007

Height
- Roof: 98 metres (322 ft) (projected)

Technical details
- Floor count: 27

Design and construction
- Developer: The Trump Organization and Irongate

Trump Ocean Resort Baja Mexico was a failed luxury condominium-hotel resort to be located at Punta Bandera in the Playas de Tijuana borough of Tijuana, Baja California, Mexico, approximately 16 kilometres (9.9 mi) from the San Ysidro border crossing.

It was initially announced in 2006 as a joint venture between the Trump Organization and Los Angeles–based real estate development company Irongate. Investors were led to believe that Trump CEO Donald Trump was supervising the project, however he was just licensing his name for the development, and so the investors sued the company.

This was the second Trump-Irongate joint venture, and followed the more successful Trump International Hotel and Tower (Honolulu) venture.

The project was to be a 3-tower, 25-story, 526-unit condo-hotel.

In late 2008, with the project experiencing delays and cost overruns, Trump removed his name from the development.

In early 2009, The Associated Press reported that the project had collapsed financially; investors who had put down deposits on the project condos faced a total loss of their down payments (typically $200,000 – $300,000 per person). After its collapse, Trump (whose videos promoting the development had been shown to potential investors) claimed that he had been little more than a spokesperson for the entire venture, and disavowed any financial responsibility for the debacle.

In the litigation that ensued in a California court, Donald Trump, his son Donald Trump Jr., his daughter Ivanka Trump and the Trump Organization were named as defendants citing violation of Federal and State law. Trump's attorneys sought to question a San Diego Union-Tribune reporter about a 2006 story with the headline "Trump puts 'brand' on Baja with condo-hotel," which quoted Trump as being a "significant," equity investor in the development. Citing California's Shield Law, a California court rejected Trump's effort, siding with attorneys for the newspaper reporter.

After 4 1/2 years of litigation, Trump settled the lawsuit against him in November 2013, for an undisclosed amount. Trump's developer partners, Jason Grosfeld, Adam Fisher and Irongate Developers had earlier settled with the buyers for $7.25 million. The attorneys representing almost 200 buyers in the litigation venued in Los Angeles County were Bart I. Ring and Daniel J. King.

On October 29, 2016, Jaime Martínez Veloz filed a criminal complaint against Trump for fraud involved in this development as well as tax evasion on Trump's mercantile business in Mexico.

== See also ==
- List of things named after Donald Trump
