= Trumped =

Trumped may refer to:

- Trumped!, a talk radio program with Donald Trump, 2004–2008
- Trumped! (book), a 1991 book about Donald Trump
- Trumped (2009 film), a short thriller film by Michael Whitton
- Trumped (2017 film), a documentary film about Donald Trump
- Trumped (Jimmy Kimmel Live!), a 2016 satirical short film by Nathan Lane and Matthew Broderick

== See also ==
- You've Been Trumped, a 2011 documentary film
- Trump (disambiguation)
