= DeWitt Tishman Architects =

DeWitt Tishman Architects was a New York architecture firm headed by Peter DeWitt. The firm, which has worked extensively in Jersey City is known for the use of brick, color, and pattern in designing residential towers within tight budget constraints.

Peter DeWitt founded the firm in 1992; the name was changed to DeWitt Tishman when Erica Tishman joined him in 1993. On December 17, 2019, Erica Tishman, wife of Steven Tishman, was killed when she was struck in the head by falling debris from a Manhattan high rise building.

== Style ==
According to DeWitt, "Even a simple box building, built under tight budget restraints, can be animated by imaginative facade elements." Tishman says that, "We are not timid in our choice of brickwork and colors,.. We make bold use of pattern and color, which I think is what is very distinctive about our buildings."

According to New York Times architecture critic Antoinette Martin, "the team has helped pushed brick to its creative edge, designing structures that are instantly identifiable even in Hudson riverfront towns like Hoboken, where brick facades are as common as street signs." Martin cites the million-square-foot apartment tower at 333 River Street in Hoboken, describing it as "Simply not a building one could fail to notice. Clad in a coat of red, yellow and orange brick with alternating bands and solid-color strips, the structure seems to strut its stuff rather than just hunker down on the banks across from Midtown, as so many more staid older brick structures in Hoboken do." At 333 River Street, the firm used "red, yellow and terra cotta brick to break the tall building into smaller horizontal and vertical components" referencing the city's early 20th-century warehouses.

According to Tishman, at the Trump Plaza in Jersey City the firm "designed a brick building, articulated with setbacks and different colors of brick, and many large windows." Tishman described it as an example of "value engineering," reserving expensive materials for the building's public spaces. The New York Times described the lobby as, "distinctly lavish," with a huge limestone fireplace, oxidized bronze details, ebony woodwork and white onyx walls.

The New York Times credits DeWitt Tishman with helping create a "distinctive" skyline for the New Jersey riverfront.

Peter DeWitt died in 2022.

== Awards ==
- Palladio Award 2005 for 124 Hudson Street in the Tribeca historic district.

== Projects ==
- Trump Plaza (Jersey City)
- Trump Bay Street
