= Mavericks Cape Town =

Gentlemen's club in Cape Town, South Africa

Mavericks Revue Bar is a gentlemen's club, situated on Barrack Street, Cape Town, South Africa. Opened in November 2001 by South African entrepreneur, Shane Harrison, Mavericks was established in response to South Africa relaxing its outlook on adult entertainment and strip clubs. It was the first nightclub in Cape Town to legally employ dancers for striptease.

== Description ==
Mavericks has several lounges on three distinct levels. The Main Club offers a view of two of the five pole dancing stages, and table dancing (or lap dancing) while guests mingle with the performers. The VIP Mezzanine Level stretches along the balcony and offers an uninhabited view of its two stages. It is more exclusive than the main table dancing floor with private booths and personal hostesses. The Platinum Lounge focuses on a brass bird cage; in order to be admitted to this level, guests must either have membership status or can gain temporary access by paying a cover charge. The Xtravaganza (VIP) Bar is slightly quieter than the buzzing main floor, with shimmering interiors and its own private pole dancing stage. The Library is an intimate area which has its own private gentlemen's club entrance, a librarian and hostesses with a private stage and private lap dance booths. The Smoking and Cigar Lounge is a separate lounge accessible to all guests.

== See also ==
- Porn star martini
