= Dermatotrophy =

Rare reproductive behaviour

Dermatotrophy is a rare reproductive behaviour in which the young feed on the skin of its parents. It has been observed in several species of caecilian, including Boulengerula taitana, and is claimed to exist in the newly discovered unpublished species Dermophis donaldtrumpi.
