= Trump magazines =

Various American publications (1997–2009)

Trump Style / Trump World / Trump Magazine
- Cover of Trump Magazine (2006)
- Editor-in-chief: Alyson Boxman Levine (2002)
- Editor: Glen Albin (2007)
- Categories: Business
- Frequency: Quarterly (2002–2003; 2007); Bimonthly (2004)
- Circulation: Trump Style: 130,000 (1997); Trump World: 100,000 (2002); 200,000 (2004); Trump Magazine: 207,000 (2006); 100,000 (2007)
- Publisher: The New York Times Custom Publishing (1997); Lockwood Publications (2002–2003); Sobe Life (2004–2007); Ocean Drive Media Group (2007–2009)
- First issue: February 1997; 29 years ago (Trump Style)
- Final issue: May 2009 (Trump Magazine)
- Country: United States
- Language: English

Several magazines named after Donald Trump were published between 1997 and 2009. Trump Style, launched in February 1997, was available for free to VIP guests at Trump's hotel-casino properties, and was also available to residents of Trump's condominium buildings and members of his Mar-a-Lago club.

A new magazine known as Trump World, initially pitched to Trump by Michael Jacobson, was launched in November 2002, as a replacement for Trump Style. Because of a dispute between Jacobson and the magazine's publishing company, Trump World was discontinued after its second issue was printed in May 2003.

Trump World was relaunched in September 2004, and was renamed as Trump Magazine in March 2006. A special edition for the New York City area was launched later that year. A new version of Trump Magazine was launched in November 2007; the publication ended in May 2009, due to poor advertising sales as a result of the Great Recession.

== History ==
=== Trump Style (1997–2002) ===
In October 1996, Donald Trump announced plans for Trump Style, a magazine to be distributed at his condo and hotel properties beginning in early 1997. Trump Style was pitched to Trump by David Pecker, who would go on to head American Media, Inc. (AMI) and be the lead witness for the Manhattan District Attorney in prosecuting Trump over the AMI "Catch-and-Kill" Scandals, in exchange for immunity. The magazine was to be published by The New York Times Company's custom-publishing division, with 100,000 copies to be distributed on two separate occasions in 1997. Trump planned to switch the magazine to a quarterly publication in 1998. The premiere issue was to include fashion and food information, as well as horoscopes, a story about Italy's Amalfi Coast, and the latest information regarding Trump's casino games and shows.

Trump Style was launched by The New York Times Custom Publishing in February 1997. The magazine had a self-reported circulation of 130,000, and was available for free to VIP guests who stayed at Trump's hotel-casino properties in Atlantic City, New Jersey. Trump Style was also available to residents of Trump's five Trump-branded condominium buildings in New York, and to members of his Mar-a-Lago club in Florida.

The premiere issue contained 68 color pages made of heavyweight paper, and was arranged into several sections: Trump News, providing information on Trump's new Trump International Hotel and Tower in Manhattan; Trump Scene, featuring six pictures of famous visitors to Mar-a-Lago, including multiple pictures of Trump and his wife Marla Maples; Casino News, offering information about Trump's casinos; and horoscopes written by Athena Starwoman. Other sections included Wines and Spirits, and Trends. Martin DeAngelis of The Press of Atlantic City wrote a positive review of Trump Style, and noted that the magazine "is, tragically, not on sale – anywhere."

=== Trump World (2002–2003) ===
Michael Jacobson, who was involved with Lockwood Publications, stayed in a suite at the Trump Marina hotel-casino in Atlantic City at the end of 2001. Jacobson conceived the idea for a Trump-branded magazine after noticing that his suite offered no magazines to read. Jacobson met Trump shortly thereafter and the two agreed to start a magazine that would be named after Trump.

On November 14, 2002, at the World Bar inside Trump World Tower in New York, Trump unveiled plans to replace Trump Style with a new magazine to be known as Trump World. Jacobson expected to spend under $1 million to launch the new magazine, which would be published quarterly. A total of 50,000 copies would be offered to guests for free at Trump's country clubs, condominium properties, and hotel-casinos, while another 50,000 would be mailed to upper-class people. Trump, who would not be spending any money on the magazine, would still earn a portion of the profits. Trump said, "I have editorial control, but I also have a tremendous lack of time. I'm not going to be checking commas. I'm not going to be very involved." The magazine's editor-in-chief was Alyson Boxman Levine. Charlotte Ross appeared on the cover of the new magazine.

After the second issue was published in May 2003, Lockwood Publications ended its publication of Trump World because of a dispute between Jacobson and Lockwood. Jacobson had wanted to turn Trump World into a paid-circulation magazine and increase its distribution, an idea that Lockwood rejected. Lockwood had already done so for another magazine that it published – known as Smoke – and was reluctant to do the same for another one of its magazines. Lockwood sold Trump World to Jacobson for less than $100,000.

=== Trump World revival (2004–2006) ===
In June 2004, Trump announced plans for a redesigned version of Trump World that would be sold to the public as a bimonthly magazine, with an initial printing of 200,000 copies. Jacobson would serve as the editor and publisher of a new company known as Sobe Life LLC, which had more than $1 million in financial support from Lee Fry, a Chicago entrepreneur who would serve as the magazine's primary financial backer and as chief executive officer (CEO) of Sobe Life. Jacobson said the new magazine would be distributed to approximately 50,000 rooms located at Trump's properties, and would be offered for free to guests, while an additional 150,000 would be for sale nationally.

The magazine would be targeted at people between the ages of 21 and 55, and would focus on diverse topics including arts and entertainment, food and wine, travel, and real estate, as well as successful business stories, and information about the second season of Trump's reality television series, The Apprentice. Jacobson, who believed that the success of The Apprentice would help sales of the new Trump World, said that 30 percent of the magazine would focus on Trump's properties.

Trump World went on sale in September 2004. Model Caprice Bourret appeared on the cover of the first issue. As of December 2005, the magazine had lost more than $3 million and was largely considered to be a failure. However, as part of a licensing agreement, Trump earned $120,000 for each issue published that year. Beginning in 2006, Trump received a royalty fee of $135,000 for each issue, and was to continue receiving royalty fees through 2009. Trump also had the right to read and approve each issue at least 10 days prior to its publication.

=== Trump Magazine (2006–2009) ===
In March 2006, Jacobson renamed the magazine as Trump Magazine and began marketing it towards men. Jacobson changed the magazine to focus on Trump's lifestyle and personality, and also placed Trump on the cover of the spring 2006 issue. The changes were successful, with the spring issue earning approximately $250,000. Trump's daughter, model Ivanka Trump, appeared on the summer 2006 cover of the revamped magazine to help attract male readers.

In October 2006, a New York City edition of Trump Magazine was launched and sold out within 30 days. At that time, Trump World had a circulation of 207,000, a quarter of which was distributed to Trump's properties. That month, plans were announced to launch a south Florida edition in February 2007.

Premiere Publishing Group – the parent company of Sobe Life, with Jacobson as its CEO – published Trump Magazine until 2007. Ocean Drive Media Group announced plans for a new Trump Magazine in September 2007, with the first issue scheduled for launch in November 2007. The new magazine would be published quarterly, with wider distribution than the previous version of Trump Magazine. The initial printing would consist of 100,000 copies, which would be distributed for free at Trump properties and would also be sold in several cities where the properties were located. Glen Albin would serve as the editor.

Niche Media acquired Trump Magazine in 2007, as part of its acquisition of Ocean Drive Media. Niche ended the magazine in May 2009, because of low advertisement sales as a result of the Great Recession. In February 2016, the New York Daily News reported that issues of Trump World "are nowhere to be found online and hardcopies are likely a rare collector's item."

== See also ==
- List of things named after Donald Trump
