= Tetragramma donaldtrumpi =

Tetragramma donaldtrumpi Temporal range: Aptian

Scientific classification
- Kingdom: Animalia
- Phylum: Echinodermata
- Class: Echinoidea
- Order: †Phymosomatoida
- Family: †Diplopodiidae
- Genus: †Tetragramma
- Species: †T. donaldtrumpi

Binomial name
- †Tetragramma donaldtrumpi Thompson, 2016

Species of fossil sea urchins

Tetragramma donaldtrumpi is a species of fossil sea urchin first formally described by William R. Thompson Jr. in 2016. The species is best known for being named after Donald Trump.

== History of Study ==
Specimens referable to Tetragramma donaldtrumpi were originally erroneously published under the name Diplopodia texanum in 1966. The species was previously recombined into Tetragramma under the name Tetragramma texanum, in 1947. More Tetragramma donaldtrumpi specimens were again published in 1987 under Tetragramma texanum.

In 2009, Tetragramma donaldtrumpi specimens were first recognized as a distinct population by Andrew Smith and William Radar. It was not until 2016 that the species was first formally described by Bill Thompson, with four diagnostic specimens collected from Hancock, Texas. Thompson named the species to honor then Republican presidential nominee Donald Trump, which attracted media attention.

== Description ==
Tetragramma donaldtrumpi individuals are known to be around 1 inch (2.5 cm) in size and round in shape. The genus Tetragramma is known from the Upper Jurassic (Oxfordian) to the Upper Cretaceous (Turonian). The specimen locality is from the Lower Cretaceous, Trinity Group, of the Glen Rose Formation in the United States. It resembles the smaller Tetragramma malbosi of Colombia.

== Paleoecology ==
Tetragramma donaldtrumpi lived on the coasts of the paleocontinent Laurentia in the ancient Gulf of Mexico during the Aptian. It was related to the contemporary and cooccurring Tetragramma texanum, but it occurred in far fewer numbers. It is only known to have existed during the deposition of the Glen Rose Formation, which is better known for its dinosaur footprints in Dinosaur Valley State Park.

== See also ==
- List of things named after Donald Trump
- List of organisms named after famous people (born 1925–1949)
