= Drinks Americas =

Drinks Americas Holdings, Ltd.
- Traded as: Expert Market: DKAM
- Headquarters: Wilton, Connecticut, United States
- Key people: J. Patrick Kenny (president and CEO); Bruce K. Klein (chairperson)

Drinks Americas (Expert Market: DKAM) is a beverage distribution company headquartered in Wilton, Connecticut. Drinks Americas Holdings, Ltd., develops, owns, markets, and internationally distributes alcoholic and non-alcoholic beverages associated with celebrities.

== Products ==
The company's non-alcoholic brands include the distribution of Paul Newman's Own Lightly Sparkling Fruit Juice Drinks, Flavored Waters, and Teas. Besides the products below, Drinks Americas also owns and distributes Damiana Liqueur and Aguila Tequila from Mexico, Cohete Rum Guarana from Panama, Willie Nelson's Old Whiskey River Bourbon and Bourbon Cream, and Casa BoMargo Wines.

=== Rheingold Beer ===
The Rheingold brand was purchased by Drinks Americas Holdings Ltd. in 2005. In September 2010 the distribution of Rheingold Beer was expanded to Connecticut, New Jersey and Pennsylvania, as well as Maryland in November.

=== Trump Super Premium Vodka ===
Trump Super Premium Vodka was released in 2006, with the slogan: "Success Distilled." Commenting on the initial introduction of his signature vodka, Donald Trump remarked on Larry King Live: "A great friend of mine was a founder of Grey Goose. And what we're going to do is top it. I want to top them just because it's fun to top my friends." In 2007 Recolte of Russia committed to an annual purchase of 50,000 cases for the Russian market, totaling $7.5 million per year. In 2008, flavored Trump vodkas were released including raspberry, grape, orange, and citron. The Trump Vodka brand was discontinued in the U.S. in 2011 due to sales failing to meet the company threshold requirements, however it is still sold in Israel.

=== Universal Interscope Geffen A&M Records ===
In June 2007, Drinks Americas entered into a partnership agreement with Interscope Geffen A&M Records, a subsidiary of Universal Music Group.

In February 2008, Drinks Americas entered into an equity partnership with Dr. Dre to develop a line of alcoholic and non-alcoholic beverages including cognacs, sparkling vodka, champagne, and tequila bearing Dr. Dre's name.

== Trademarks ==
Drinks Americas currently holds trademarks on the following products: TKO, Success Distilled, Trumptini, Cohete, and those waiting to be applied to new product introductions: Aftermath, Topless, Pacifique, LeBasse, El Jefe, Client Number 9, Dragonfly, Rock It, Rock Cola, and D'Oro.

== Board of directors ==
- J. Patrick Kenny, president and chief executive officer since March, 2005. He is a former senior vice president and general manager of Joseph E. Seagram & Sons.
- Bruce K. Klein, chairman of the board
- Marvin Traub, former CEO and chairman of Bloomingdales.
- Frederick Schulman, president and director of East Coast Venture Capital, Inc.
- Hubert Millet, former president of Seagram's Global Brands Division based in Paris.

On November 22, 2010 it was announced that former Coca-Cola executive Shaun B. Higgins will serve in an advisory capacity to the firm.
