= Trumpet (disambiguation) =

A trumpet is a brass musical instrument.

Trumpet or The Trumpet may also refer to:

== Objects ==
- The characteristic call of any brass instrument
- Ear trumpet, a device for assisting hearing

== Geography ==
- Trumpet, Herefordshire, a village
- Trumpet interchange, a kind of road interchange
- Trumpet (satellite), a series of three reconnaissance satellites

== Media ==
=== Books and magazines ===
- Trumpet (novel), a novel by Jackie Kay
- The Philadelphia Trumpet, a monthly news magazine published by the Philadelphia Church of God; thetrumpet.com
- Gideon's Trumpet, a book by Anthony Lewis, published in 1965
- Trumpet of the Swan by E. B. White

=== Film ===
- The Trumpet, part of the film project Ten Minutes Older

=== Music ===
- Trumpet Concerto (disambiguation)
- Trumpet (organ stop)
- "Trumpets" (Jason Derulo song), 2013
- "Trumpets" (Sak Noel and Salvi song), 2016

== Other ==
- Trumpet (ice cream), a New Zealand brand of coned ice cream

== See also ==
- Trumpet tree (disambiguation)
- Gabriel's Horn, also known as Torricelli's trumpet; a three-dimensional geometric figure
- Elephant communication
- Trumpeter (disambiguation)
- La Trompette (disambiguation)
