= Trump House =

Roadside attraction in Latrobe, Pennsylvania

- Location within Pennsylvania Location within the United States

General information
- Status: Completed
- Type: Farmhouse
- Architectural style: Mid-Atlantic Colonial
- Location: 4432 State Route 982, Unity Township, Pennsylvania, United States
- Coordinates: 40°17′01″N 79°22′03″W
- Opened: 2016

Technical details
- Floor count: 2

Design and construction
- Known for: Support hub and advertisement for Donald Trump

The Trump House is a farmhouse in Unity Township, Pennsylvania. The structure is painted on all sides with the American flag and was a support hub for the Donald Trump 2020 presidential campaign.

== History ==
The house was painted and converted from an abandoned structure in early 2016, operating as a support hub for the Trump campaign in both 2016 and 2020. In early September 2016, Trump posted on Facebook about the house, including a picture of the structure.

Friends from Pennsylvania just sent this to me! A beautiful home in the tiny town of Youngstown, PA - birthplace of golf legend, Arnold Palmer. Safe to say, they are on the #TrumpTrain! Thank you for your support!

— Donald J. Trump on Facebook, September 5, 2016

In October 2016, a driver sued the owner of the house for distraction after being involved in a vehicle crash next to the structure.

=== Community reaction ===
Residents of Westmoreland County have had generally mixed reactions to the structure. In 2016, Trump won the county by a margin of more than 30 points, significantly more than any Republican presidential candidate had garnered in decades. On a campaign tour of the area, Jill Biden stated that the local Trump supporters were "disillusioned" and that the Biden campaign was "not taking any vote for granted." Both Biden and Trump lawn signs can be seen throughout the area.

The house has been described as "a Mecca of sorts for the president's supporters," with hundreds of Trump supporters visiting the house each day. The building's owners give out free Trump campaign merchandise.

== Design ==
The three-story house is painted on all sides with the American flag. A large sign facing the road reads "TRUMP 2020," with smaller lawn signs dotted around the property containing Trump campaign slogans. A 14-foot-tall (4.3 m) steel cutout of Trump stands outside the house.

== See also ==
- List of things named after Donald Trump
