= Passoã =

French liqueur

Passoã is a passion-fruit liqueur made in France, with passion fruit being the main ingredient. Invented in 1985, the brand was owned by Rémy Cointreau group. In December 2016 Passoã SAS was established as a result of a joint venture between Lucas Bols and Rémy Cointreau. The product was launched in 1986 in the European market and in 1994 worldwide, and has been a nationally best-selling liqueur in several national markets, including Puerto Rico, the Netherlands, and Belgium.

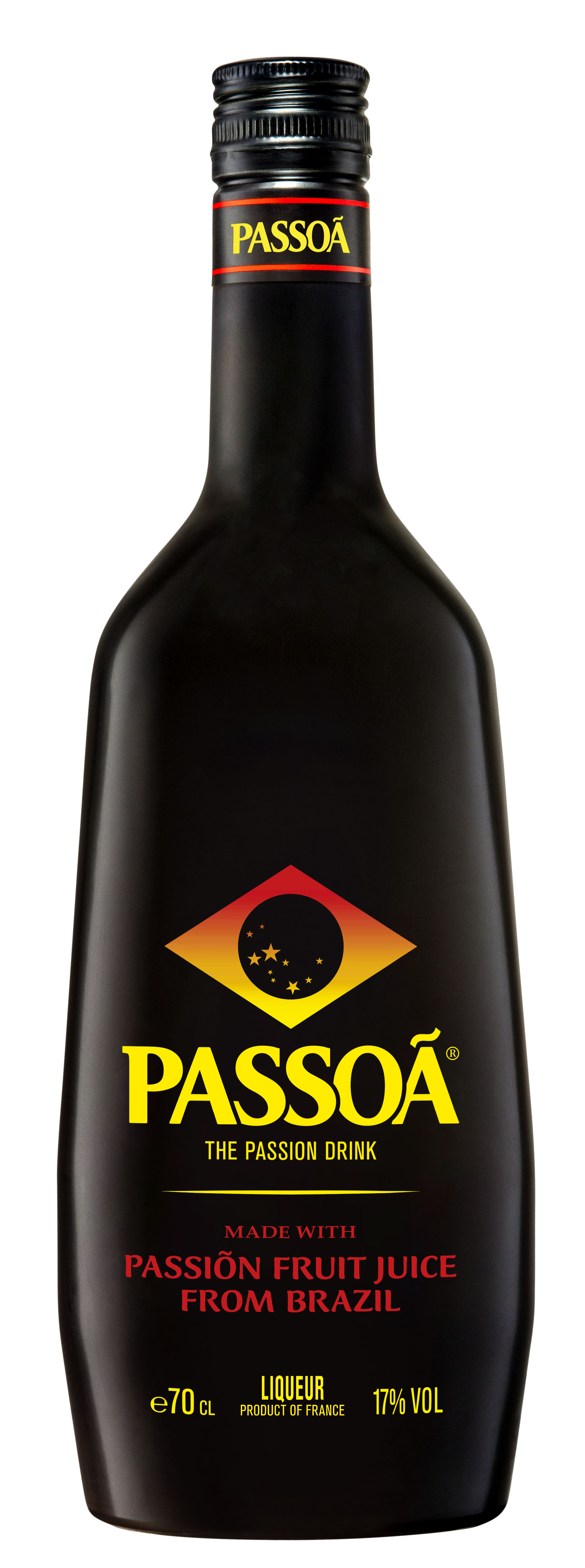
Passoã bottle

The liqueur, in the form of a red liquid, comes in a black bottle and has an alcohol volume of 14.9 to 20% - depending on the country. The original version of Passoã contains passion-fruit juice from Brazil. Passoã has also developed ready-to-serve cocktails: Cosmopolitan, Caipirinha and Zombie fire. The most popular cocktail made with Passoã is the Porn Star Martini, with vanilla vodka and prosecco on the side. One can also pair Passoã with water or with tonic.

The name "Passoã" is an instance of foreign branding; though it uses the Portuguese character ã, there is no such word in the language. The Portuguese word for passion fruit is maracujá, while the word for "passion" is paixão.

== See also ==
- List of liqueurs
