= Trump Tower (Tampa) =

Failed construction project in Tampa, Florida

Trump Tower Tampa
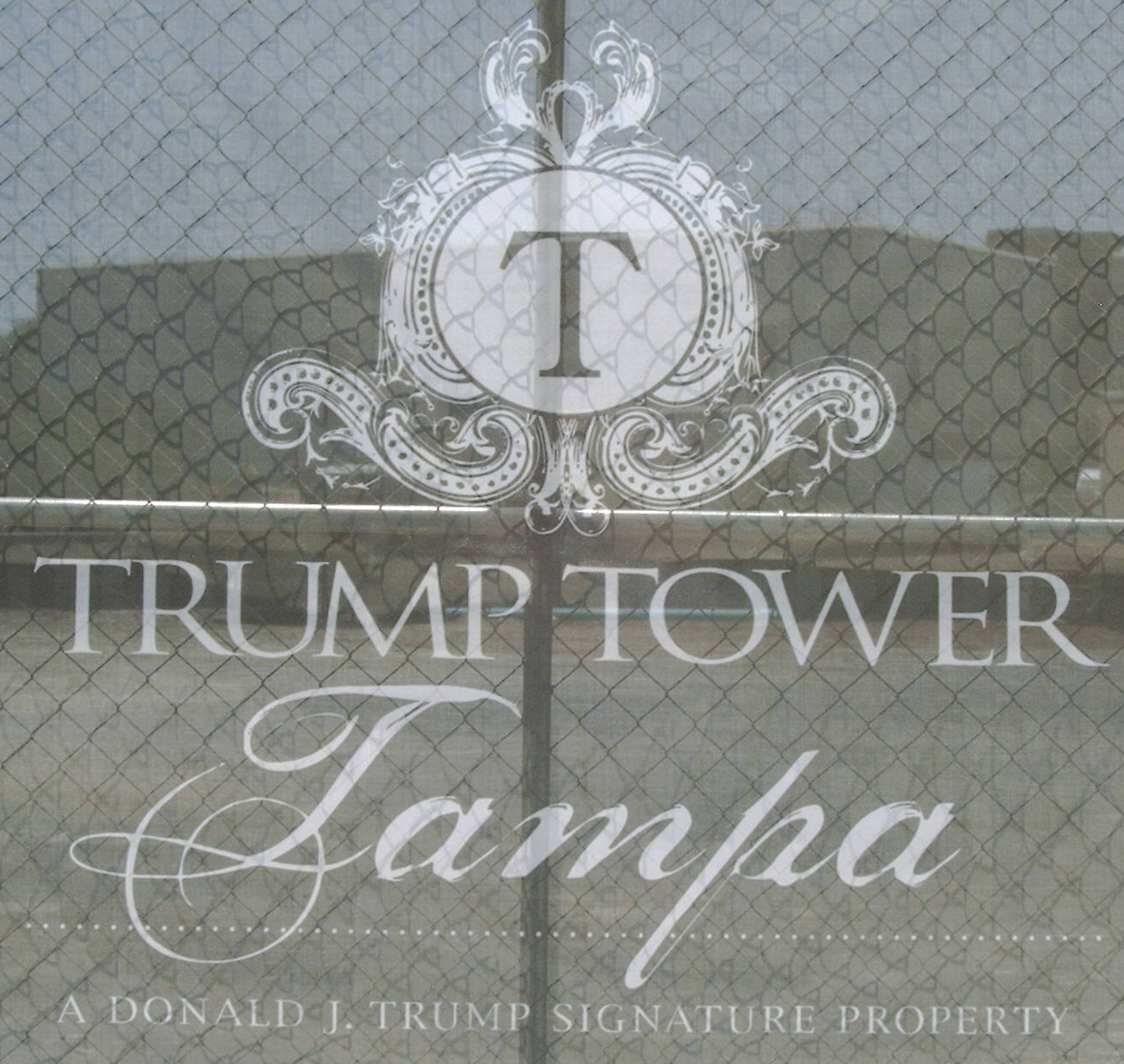
- Trump Tower Tampa logo construction screen
- Interactive map of the Trump Tower Tampa area

General information
- Status: Never built
- Type: Shopping, condo-hotels, luxury condominiums
- Location: 111 South Ashley Drive; Tampa, Florida
- Coordinates: 27.9441°N 82.4583°W
- Construction started: 2006
- Cost: Est. $225 million

Height
- Roof: 600 feet (183 m)

Technical details
- Floor count: 52
- Lifts/elevators: 8

Design and construction
- Structural engineer: SimDag LLC

Trump Tower Tampa was the name of an unfinished condominium project located in downtown Tampa, Florida, which was planned to be the tallest building in the city. Developed in a partnership between Donald Trump and SIMDAG, a Tampa-based development company, construction of the towers was never started due to the economic collapse of the real estate market. Located at the northwest corner of West Brorein St. and South Ashley Avenue, the building would have been visible from the end of Bayshore Boulevard and Tampa General Hospital on the Hillsborough River waterline.

== History ==
Ground was broken on March 2, 2006, and in July 2007 the foundation footings were drilled. In September groundwork was halted when instabilities in the bedrock were found. Pilot borings showed that the limestone in one area dipped far below that of the surrounding areas. Brownstone Partners Tampa, an investment group led by Robert Owens of OR&L Facility Services, acquired the property on June 20, 2011. St. Petersburg, Florida-based Feldman Equities filed plans with the city in late July 2015, for a very similar 52-floor tower on the same property.

As of March 9, 2007, the fence surrounding the construction site was taken down and some of the construction equipment was gone; although two cranes remained. On March 9, 2007, the developers acknowledged in a press release that, "Cost overruns won't be the only obstacles Related [Related Group, the development company] faces. Soil issues at the site, unpaid contractors and a general perception from the community that the 52-story luxury condominium tower will never be built also stand in the way of making the tower a success."

On May 30, 2007, Donald Trump demanded his name be removed from the project, and sued the developers for over $1 million in unpaid license fees for the use of the Trump name. On the same day, the phone at the developer's office was listed as disconnected. Buyers who put down 20 percent deposits of units priced from $700,000 to $6 million only got half their money refunded and lawsuits were filed against Trump.

In 2011, a partnership headed by real-estate developer Richard Owens paid $5 million for property that included the site of the planned Trump Tower Tampa, and announced plans for a mixed-use development on the site.

== See also ==
- List of things named after Donald Trump
