= Trump Vodka =

Brand of vodka

- Promotional image
- Type: Vodka
- Manufacturer: Drinks Americas
- Introduced: 2005
- Discontinued: 2011 (in the United States)
- Related products: List of vodkas

Trump Vodka was an American brand of vodka produced at first in the Netherlands, then later in Germany by Drinks Americas under license from the Trump Organization. The brand was launched in the United States in 2005, but ceased production under the Trump name in 2011 when it failed to meet the required threshold for distribution. However, it is still sold (in 2016) in Israel, especially around the Jewish holiday of Passover.

== History ==
In 2005, Drinks Americas signed with Donald Trump to promote a new brand of vodka which became known as Trump Vodka. The brand was launched with the slogan "Success Distilled", with Trump predicting it would outsell Grey Goose vodka. He also said that when mixed with tonic, which he referred to as a "Trump & Tonic" (T&T), it would become the most drunk cocktail in the United States. In 2007, Drinks Americas signed a deal to export 50,000 cases of Trump Vodka annually to Russia.

The Trump Vodka brand was discontinued in the United States in 2011 due to sales failing to meet the company threshold requirements. Several reasons were attributed for this. One was because Trump himself is a non-drinker and never drank Trump Vodka, as he blamed alcohol for the death of his brother Fred Trump, Jr. Drinks Americas also had problems producing it because the glass used in the bottles and the gold leaf labels were expensive and the company could not afford to produce them in large numbers. In 2015, during his campaign for president, Trump did not include Trump Vodka amongst assets submitted to the Federal Election Committee.

== Lawsuits ==
Drinks Americas was subject to several lawsuits surrounding Trump Vodka. Bruni Glass sued over unpaid bills and, consequently, melted 500,000 Trump Vodka mini-bottles ready for shipment. Donald Trump also sued Drinks Americas for unpaid royalties, but the case was dismissed for lack of subject matter jurisdiction.

== Israel ==
Trump Vodka started being sold unofficially in Israel by H. Pixel International based on a signed deal with Drinks Americas, but Trump brought a lawsuit against the company for copyright infringement, as they did not have his agreement to use his image in advertising or the brand. However, Trump later dropped the lawsuit and signed a deal with H. Pixel International to allow them to sell Trump Vodka in Israel.

Despite the failures in the United States, Trump Vodka found a level of popularity in Israel. This was because it was a popular choice around Passover for both secular and Orthodox Jews, as the vodka was made from potatoes and not grain, thus satisfying kosher for Passover dietary laws. However, some Trump Vodka produced in 2013 was found to contain leavened ingredients, making it unsuitable for consumption during Passover.

== See also ==
- Business projects of Donald Trump in Russia
- List of things named after Donald Trump
