= Trump Plaza (Jersey City) =

Skyscraper in Jersey City, New Jersey

88 Morgan Street
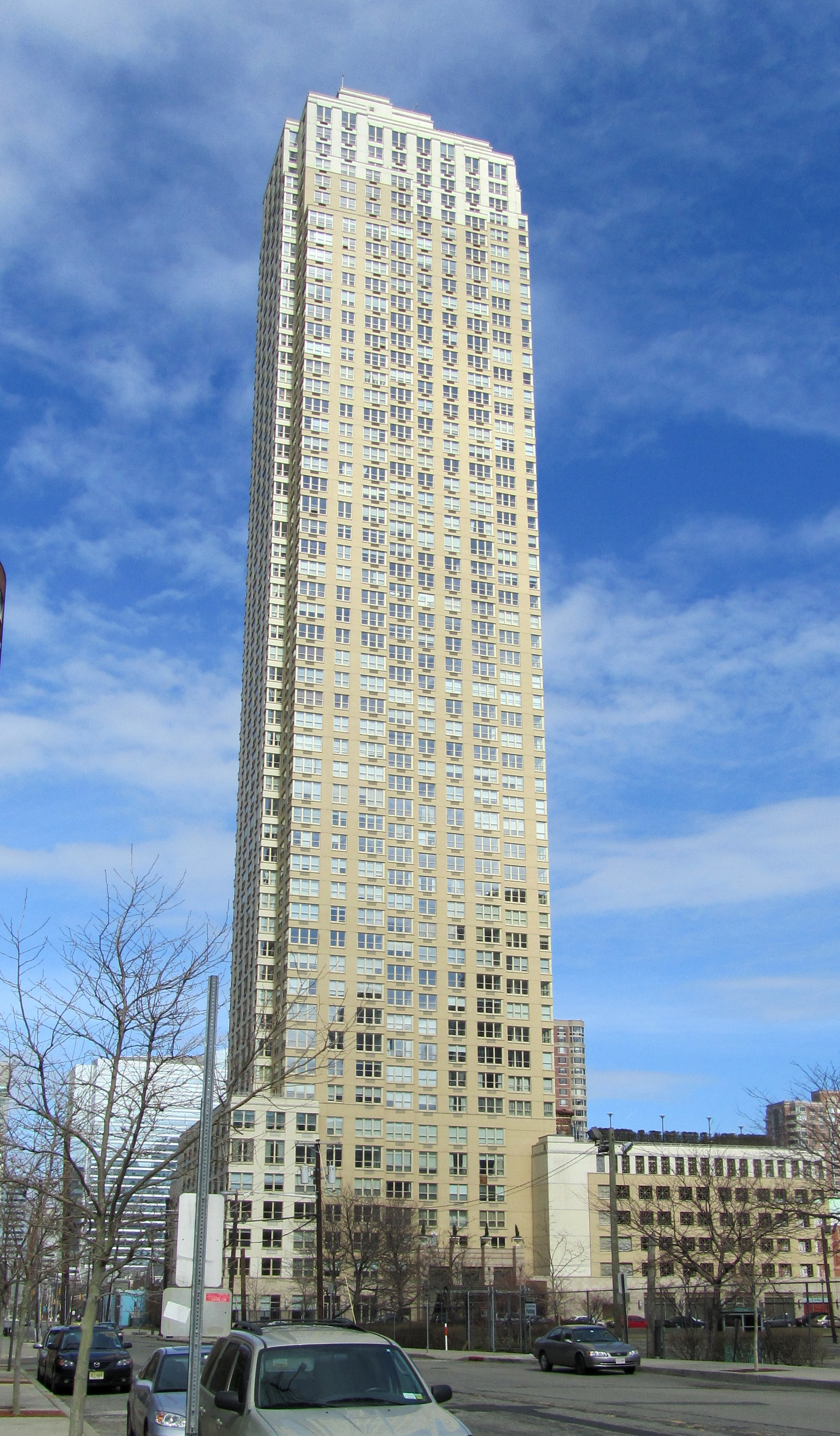
- The building pictured in 2011

General information
- Status: Completed
- Type: Residential
- Coordinates: 40.7195°N 74.0365°W
- Construction started: 2006
- Completed: 2008

Height
- Roof: 532 ft (162 m)

Technical details
- Floor count: 55
- Floor area: 1,743,760 ft^{2} (162,001 m^{2})

Design and construction
- Architect: DeWitt Tishman Architects LLP
- Main contractor: Bovis Lend Lease

88 Morgan Street, formerly known as Trump Plaza, is the first of two apartment complex buildings to be built in Jersey City, New Jersey. Trump Plaza Residences is 532 ft tall (162 m) and has 55 floors, and is the 7th tallest residential building in New Jersey. In 2020, the Trump name was removed from the properties and has been renamed the 88 Morgan Street Condominiums.

The property was initially approved in 1999 for a twin-tower project to be known as HarborSpire, which never materialized. In 2005, Donald Trump and Dean Geibel partnered to develop Trump Plaza on the property. The project was to consist of two towers, the first of which opened in 2008. The second tower, known as Trump Bay Street, was opened in 2016.

== History ==
=== Initial plans ===
Since the mid-1980s, the property – located at the intersection of Washington Street and Bay Street, near the Hudson River – had been intended for office development. In 1999, plans were approved for HarborSpire, a twin-tower apartment and retail project to be built on the property, which was being used as a parking lot. The project was to be developed by Vector Urban Renewal, a partnership of David B. Barry's The Applied Development Company (based in Hoboken, New Jersey) and Liberty Center Associates, a group of investors from New Jersey and Florida who owned the land.

The project was designed by Peter DeWitt of Manhattan, and would consist of a 55-story tower with 445 apartment units and a 50-story tower with 417 units. The towers would be made of brick, and would feature an Art Deco theme. The project would be the tallest residential building in New Jersey. In February 2001, the project received a 20-year tax abatement.

The project was to be managed by Applied. Construction of the taller tower, expected to cost $80 million, was to begin in November 2001. The complex was to cost a total of $140 million, and would be built over the following four years, with construction on the second tower beginning once the first one was mostly complete.

HarborSpire did not materialize, although plans for the project were revived in 2004, as a joint development between Applied and New Jersey developer Joseph Panepinto, who shortly thereafter sold their rights to the project to Metro Homes, co-founded by Dean Geibel.

=== Trump Plaza ===
Geibel met Donald Trump while golfing at Trump's golf course in Bedminster, New Jersey. In spring 2005, Geibel began discussions with Trump about him joining the twin-tower project. Trump became involved with the project in July 2005, a month after the two towers were approved for 20-year tax abatements. Because construction permits were still pending, Trump's involvement was not announced until September 29, 2005, when he traveled to Jersey City to make the announcement. Trump stated that he had a substantial investment in the new project, but did not specify how much.

The two towers would include the same number of floors and units as the previously planned HarborSpire towers, and were expected to cost a total of $415 million. The towers were expected to become the tallest buildings in New Jersey, surpassing the tallest office building, the 42-story Goldman Sachs Tower; and the tallest residential building, the 40-story Marbella Apartments. Construction, to be handled by Bovis Lend Lease, was expected to begin in November 2005, with occupancy expected to begin in November 2007.

Condominium units went on sale in September 2006. By February 2007, 215 units had been sold, while construction had progressed to the 25th floor and occupancy was expected for March 2008. At the time, Geibel denied that the extent of Trump's involvement was the licensing of his surname: "people don't realize how much involvement he has in the project." At Trump's suggestion, the project was to feature BMW zipcars upon its opening.

Trump Plaza was designed by DeWitt Tishman Architects LLP and was completed in 2008. The building has 1,743,760 ft^{2} (162,001 m^{2}) of space and 445 units. It was, at the time, the tallest residential building in New Jersey, and the third tallest building in Jersey City. (Note: The two taller buildings were the 781 ft (238 m) tall Goldman Sachs Tower at 30 Hudson Street (completed in 2004) and the 548 ft (167 m) tall Merrill Lynch Building at 101 Hudson Street (completed in 1994).) The property was scheduled for foreclosure on March 6, 2013.

=== Second tower ===
The second tower, Trump Plaza II, was planned to be 484 ft tall (148 m) and have 50 floors. It was also designed by DeWitt Tishman Architects LLP. In May 2010, developer Dean Geibel retained commercial real estate firm William Procida Inc. to assist in finding investors for Trump Plaza II.

The second tower was delayed, and the property for it was sold several times during the recession. Kushner Companies and KABR Group purchased the land out of foreclosure in 2011, and began construction of Trump Plaza's second phase – renamed as Trump Bay Street – in May 2014. The second tower opened in November 2016.

== See also ==
- List of things named after Donald Trump
- List of tallest buildings in Jersey City
