= Porn star martini =

Cocktail made with vodka and passion fruit

- Type: Cocktail
- Ingredients: 4 cl (4 parts) vanilla vodka; 1 cl (1 part) Passoã; 2 cl (2 parts) passion fruit puree; 2 bar spoons (or teaspoons) homemade vanilla sugar (vanilla pods blended with caster sugar)
- Base spirit: Vodka, Passoã
- Standard drinkware: Cocktail glass
- Standard garnish: Passion fruit half and an accompanying shot glass of champagne
- Served: Straight up
- Preparation: Straight: pour all ingredients into mixing glass with ice cubes. Shake well. Strain in chilled martini cocktail glass. Cut passion fruit in half, dust with vanilla sugar and use as garnish. Pour champagne into a chilled shot glass and serve alongside the martini.

The porn star martini is a passion fruit-flavoured cocktail made with vanilla-flavoured vodka, Passoã, passion fruit purée, and vanilla sugar. It is traditionally accompanied by a chilled shot glass of champagne. Some bars have adapted the original recipe to be more cost effective by using citrus and pineapple juice, though it creates a different flavour and texture. The cocktail was created in London in 2002 by Douglas Ankrah.

It is not a traditional martini, but is one of many variations that have the term martini in its name.

The porn star martini was reported to be the most ordered cocktail in the United Kingdom in November 2018.

== Origins ==
The porn star martini was invented by Douglas Ankrah, owner of LAB Bar in Soho, London, at his bar Townhouse in London in 2002. Ankrah says it was inspired by a visit to Mavericks Revue Bar Gentlemen's Club, a strip club in Cape Town, South Africa.

== Name ==
In an interview with a drinks website, Ankrah denied that the drink's name was "anything sexual", and that he named it because he thought it would be "something that a porn star would drink".

Ankrah also denied being a fan of pornography, or idolising any porn stars in particular.

In 2019, the British retailer Marks & Spencer renamed their porn star martinis to passion fruit martinis, following complaints that the name normalised pornography.

== See also ==
- Vodka martini
- List of cocktails
