= La Trompette =

La Trompette may refer to:

- La Trompette (musical society), a chamber music society that was based in Paris
- La Trompette (restaurant), a Michelin-starred restaurant
