= Trump Bay Street =

Skyscraper in Jersey City, New Jersey

65 Bay Street
- Interactive map of the 65 Bay Street area

General information
- Status: Completed
- Type: Apartments
- Location: 65 Bay Street, Jersey City, New Jersey, United States
- Coordinates: 40.719687°N 74.035624°W
- Named for: Donald Trump
- Groundbreaking: May 14, 2014
- Opened: Early November 2016
- Cost: $225 million
- Owner: Morgan Street Developers Urban Renewal Company LLC

Height
- Height: 484 ft (148 m)

Technical details
- Floor count: 50

Design and construction
- Architecture firm: DeWitt Tishman Architects; Humphreys and Partners Architects
- Developer: Morgan Street Developers Urban Renewal Company LLC

Other information
- Number of units: 447

Website
- trumpbaystreet.com

65 Bay Street is a 50-story apartment tower, originally named Trump Bay Street after Donald Trump and located at 65 Bay Street in Jersey City, New Jersey. It is located adjacent to the Trump Plaza apartment tower, which was completed in 2008. A second Trump Plaza tower had initially been planned but was delayed, and the property for the proposed building was sold several times during the Great Recession.

Kushner Companies – managed by Trump's son-in-law, Jared Kushner – and New Jersey–based KABR Group purchased the property in 2011. Groundbreaking for the second tower, Trump Bay Street, took place in May 2014. The project, built at a cost of $225 million, was opened in November 2016.

== History ==
A 55-story twin-tower apartment project known as HarborSpire was initially planned for the property, located at the intersection of Washington Street and Bay Street. The project was approved in 1999, but never materialized. In July 2005, Donald Trump became involved in a new, similar twin-tower project, to be built on the same property and to be known as Trump Plaza.

The first Trump Plaza tower was completed in 2008. The originally planned second tower was delayed, and the property for it was ultimately sold several times during the recession. Morgan Street Developers Urban Renewal Company LLC, a partnership of Kushner Companies and New Jersey-based KABR Group, purchased the property out of foreclosure in April 2011. Kushner Companies was managed by Trump's son-in-law, Jared Kushner.

In April 2014, the city council approved a five-year tax abatement for Trump Bay Street, the second phase of the Trump Plaza project. Trump Bay Street was designed by DeWitt Tishman Architects and Humphreys and Partners Architects. The structure, located one block east of Trump Plaza, was designed to resemble its twin tower.

=== Construction ===
Groundbreaking for the second tower was held on May 14, 2014. The 50-story tower was to have 447 apartment units, and was expected to take approximately 30 months to build, with construction expected to cost $193.5 million. The project was partially funded by $38.5 million from the partnership of Kushner Companies and KABR. The project was also financed for $50 million by Chinese investors through the EB-5 visa program, which Trump criticized during his 2016 presidential campaign. CIT Group also provided a $140 million loan for the project.

On September 30, 2015, during construction, a concrete block fell from the building's 31st floor and injured a police officer's torso. Most construction work was halted that day and the following day while the Occupational Safety and Health Administration, as well as state labor safety officials, investigated the incident. Before allowing construction to resume, city officials had construction workers remove debris from each floor and construct scaffolding on the building's side to protect pedestrians below. Police officers responsible for directing traffic between Trump Bay Street and another construction site also began wearing hard hats. The project was completed at a cost of approximately $225 million.

=== Opening and operation ===
Trump Bay Street began leasing apartments in early November 2016. The building includes 50 floors and stands 484 feet tall. After Trump was elected as U.S. president, Jared Kushner was appointed as a White House advisor. Kushner divested some of his stakes in Kushner Companies, but maintained economic interest in Trump Bay Street.

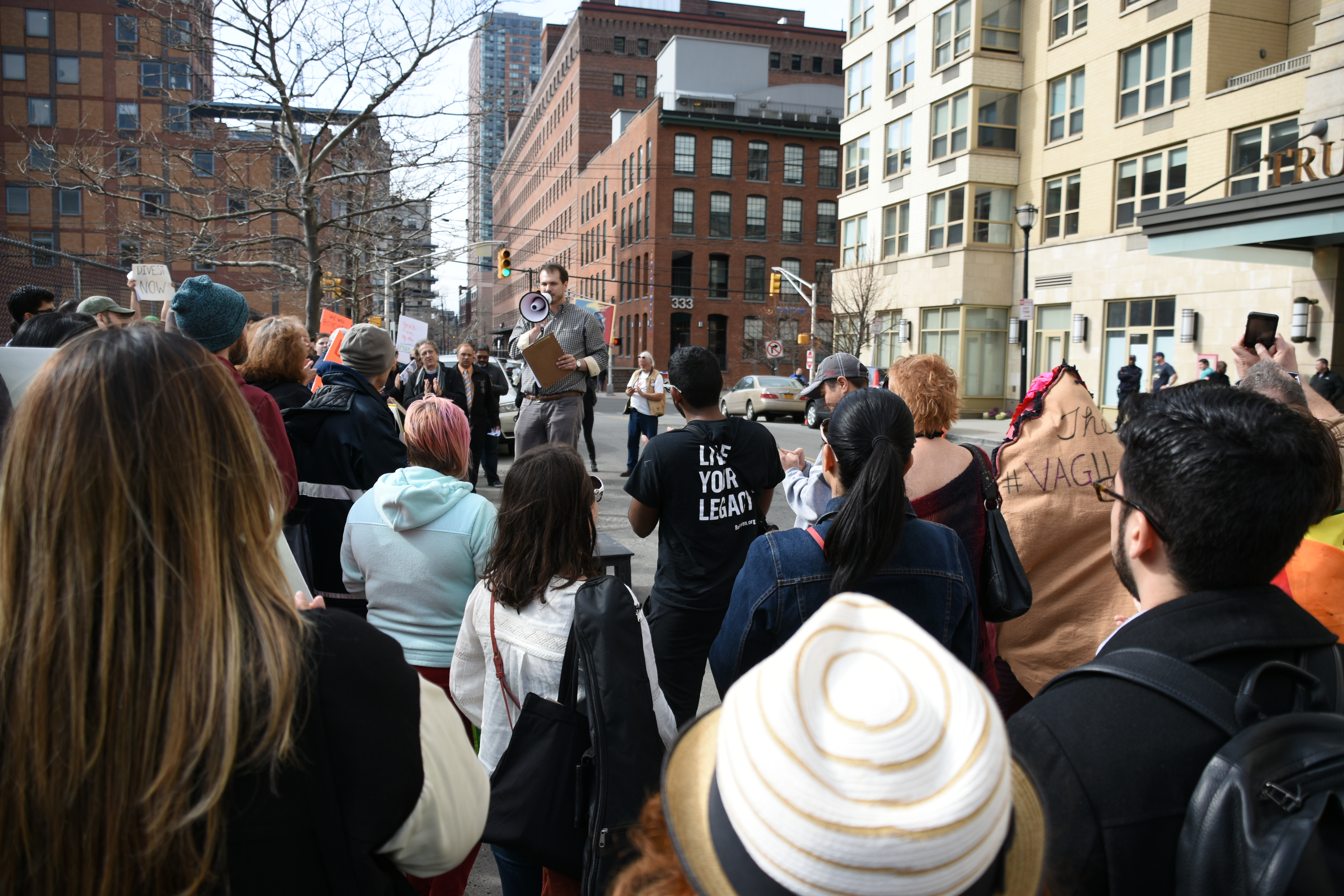
Protesters outside the building (February 25, 2017)

In February 2017, local residents protested outside the building, stating their intention to boycott any retailers that occupy space on the ground floor. Explaining their reason for protesting, the residents cited President Trump's actions that targeted illegal immigration and refugees from Muslim majority countries, as well as comments that he made in 2015, in which he claimed that thousands of Jersey City residents cheered after learning about the September 11 attacks.

In May 2017, it was reported that state officials allowed the project's developers to cite high unemployment rates in other parts of the city in order to qualify for EB-5 funding, as the area around Trump Bay Street had a low unemployment rate of less than three percent. EB-5 advisor Michael Gibson stated that such a practice, although contrary to the original purpose of the EB-5 program, was still legal. As of June 2017, more than half of the building was rented out, and the structure was valued between $340 million and $360 million.
