= Trump Castle II =

1991 video game

- Developer: Capstone Software
- Publisher: Capstone Software
- Platforms: Amiga, MS-DOS
- Release: 1991
- Genre: Gambling

Trump Castle II is a gambling video game published for Amiga and MS-DOS in 1991 by Capstone Software.

== Gameplay ==
The game includes baccarat, blackjack, craps, roulette, slots, and video poker, all following the rules of the New Jersey Casino Control Commission. The player is initially given $1,000 to play the various games. The player begins in the lobby of Trump Castle, and uses a point-and-click interface to navigate toward the gambling games or to other parts of the resort, including a hotel suite, the pool, and a restaurant; these areas, represented by digitized images of the real resort, include characters who make comments through popup speech balloons. The game also features a multiplayer option. Included with the game was the Trump Castle Gaming Guide, which is also used by the player to bypass the game's copy protection. Also included was a coupon for a one-night stay at Trump Castle's hotel.

== Release ==
Trump Castle II was released in 1991 for Amiga and MS-DOS. Capstone released two standalone add-on disks, Poker and Lots-O-$lot$, which are compatible with Trump Castle II and its predecessor.

== Reception ==
Trump Castle II and its predecessor were both successful, leading Capstone to publish a sequel.

Michael S. Lasky of Computer Gaming World called the game a "highly" improved version of its predecessor, and praised the save feature and multiplayer. However, Lasky stated that the quality of the graphical interface for each gambling game varied, with table games looking "uncannily" realistic, unlike the slot and video poker games; the latter games were also criticized for their poor payoffs. Lasky considered the copy protection to be "elaborate and annoying", and stated that the popup comments "are always inane and often sexist." He wrote that the table dealers look "real enough" but criticized the sound of card shuffling. Lasky believed the game would be appealing as an educational program for people considering a visit to a real casino, while experienced gamblers would likely be more interested in real gambling. Despite the "gimmicky and brazen advertisements", Lasky wrote that Trump Castle II offered a "modicum of casino fun" without the risk of losing real money.

Dennis Lynch of the Chicago Tribune praised the game and called it "as slick as the Donald's hairdo." Tom Malcom of .info rated the game three out of five stars and considered the animations to be "amateurish," while criticizing the gambling games, including their sluggish pace. Malcom concluded that people other than "fanatical" Trump fans would be frustrated by the game's "terminal slowness." Jeff James of Amazing Computing reviewed the Amiga version and noted that it could not be installed to a hard drive. In addition, he considered the animations of casino visitors and dealers to be "a little coarse and grainy," and criticized the sluggish pace of the gambling games. Because of these issues, he believed that the game may only appeal to avid gamblers.

Rick Ratliff of Detroit Free Press stated that people would "despise" Trump Castle II if they "hate spending lots of money for a computer game that turns out to be a flagrant and relentless advertisement", stating that every aspect of the game "is a shameless attempt to dazzle you with the wonders of this over-glitzed hotel." Ratliff considered the gambling games to be "perhaps the most insidious" aspect of Trump Castle II, and rated the game zero out of four stars. Jeane DeCoster and David Crook of the Los Angeles Times considered it an "absolutely awful excuse" for a computer game, calling it an "absurd tour" of Trump Castle and criticizing the "promo-style" images of the resort's areas. DeCoster and Crook stated that the gambling games were done well enough that they might satisfy people who enjoy gambling. However, they rated the overall game one star out of five and concluded that there "is no excuse for a program this dumb."

In 2016, Nick Thorpe of Retro Gamer reviewed the Amiga version and called it an "okay gambling game" with "some odd idiosyncracies." He considered the game "oddly-coloured and not particularly pleasant to look at," stating that it did not fully show off the Amiga's graphical capabilities. Thorpe also considered the gambling to be pointless as there is no ultimate goal other than accumulating wealth, although he considered some of the popup comments to be "kind of amusing."
