= Trump International Hotel and Tower (New Orleans) =

Canceled project in Louisiana, US

Coordinates: 29.9493°N 90.0684°W

Trump International Hotel & Tower
- An artist's conception of what the building would have looked like once completed
- Interactive map of the Trump International Hotel & Tower area

General information
- Status: Never built
- Type: shopping, condo-hotels, luxury condominiums
- Location: 501 Poydras Street; New Orleans, LA
- Cost: $400 million

Height
- Antenna spire: 842 feet (257 m)
- Roof: 716 feet (218 m)

Technical details
- Floor count: 70 (officially 69, no 13th floor)
- Floor area: 1,600,000 square feet (148,645 m^{2})

Design and construction
- Architect: Adache Group

The Trump International Hotel and Tower was a proposed residential tower located in the Central Business District of New Orleans, Louisiana. It was a project of real estate mogul Donald Trump's Trump Organization. Supposedly in the planning stages from summer 2005 on, the project was finally declared dead in July 2011 after the location land was foreclosed on and sold at auction.

If constructed, the Trump Tower would have become the tallest building in the city of New Orleans and the state of Louisiana, at seventy stories. At a height of 716 feet (218 m) along with a 126-foot (38 m) spire, it would also be the tallest building along the Gulf Coast outside of Houston, as well as the tallest point in the state of Louisiana. (Louisiana's highest peak is Driskill Mountain, at 535 feet.) It was planned to be a multi-use building with the ground floors allocated for retail shopping, the lower floors would have been luxury condo-hotels and the upper floors will be luxury condominiums.

== History ==
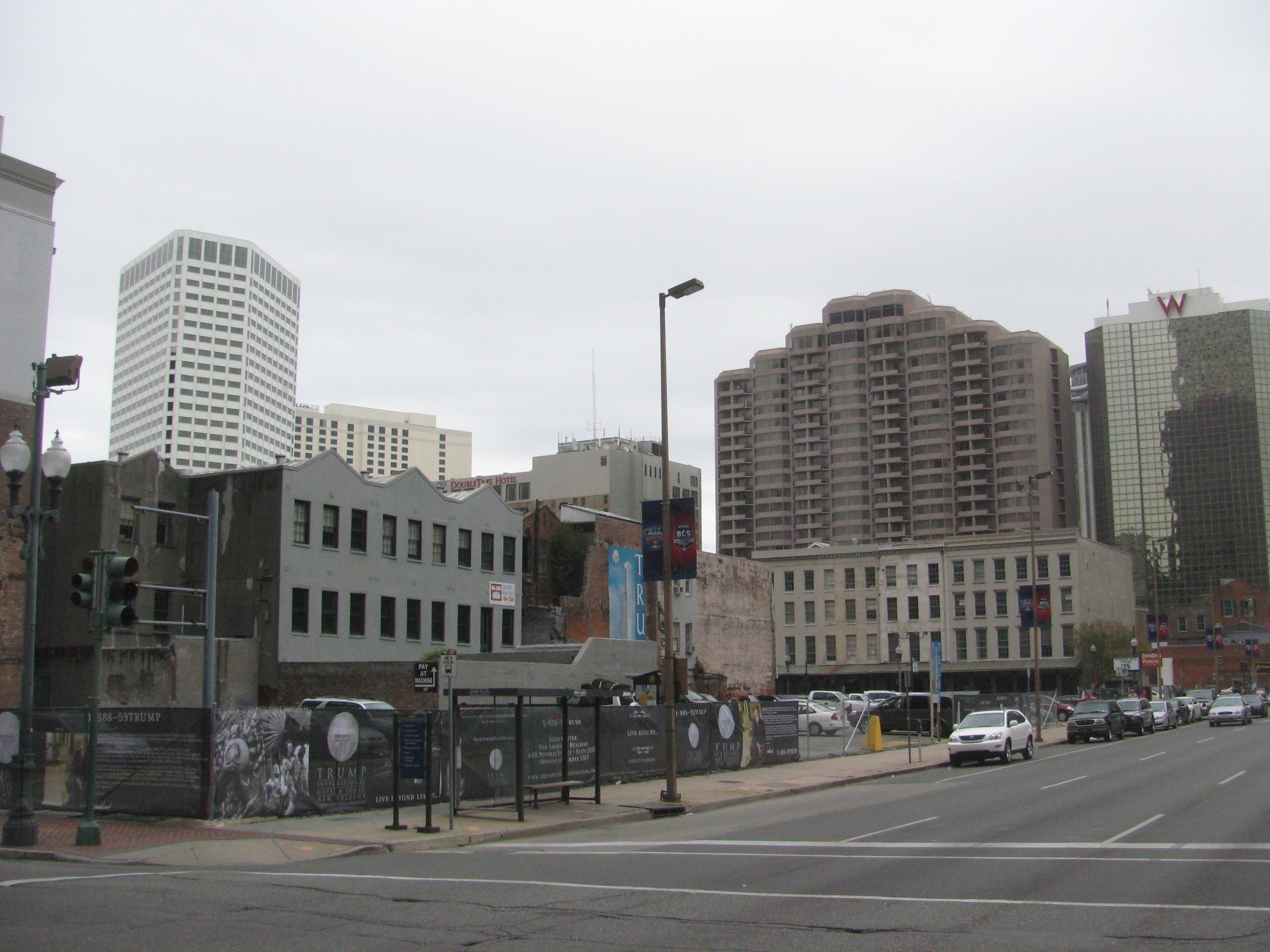
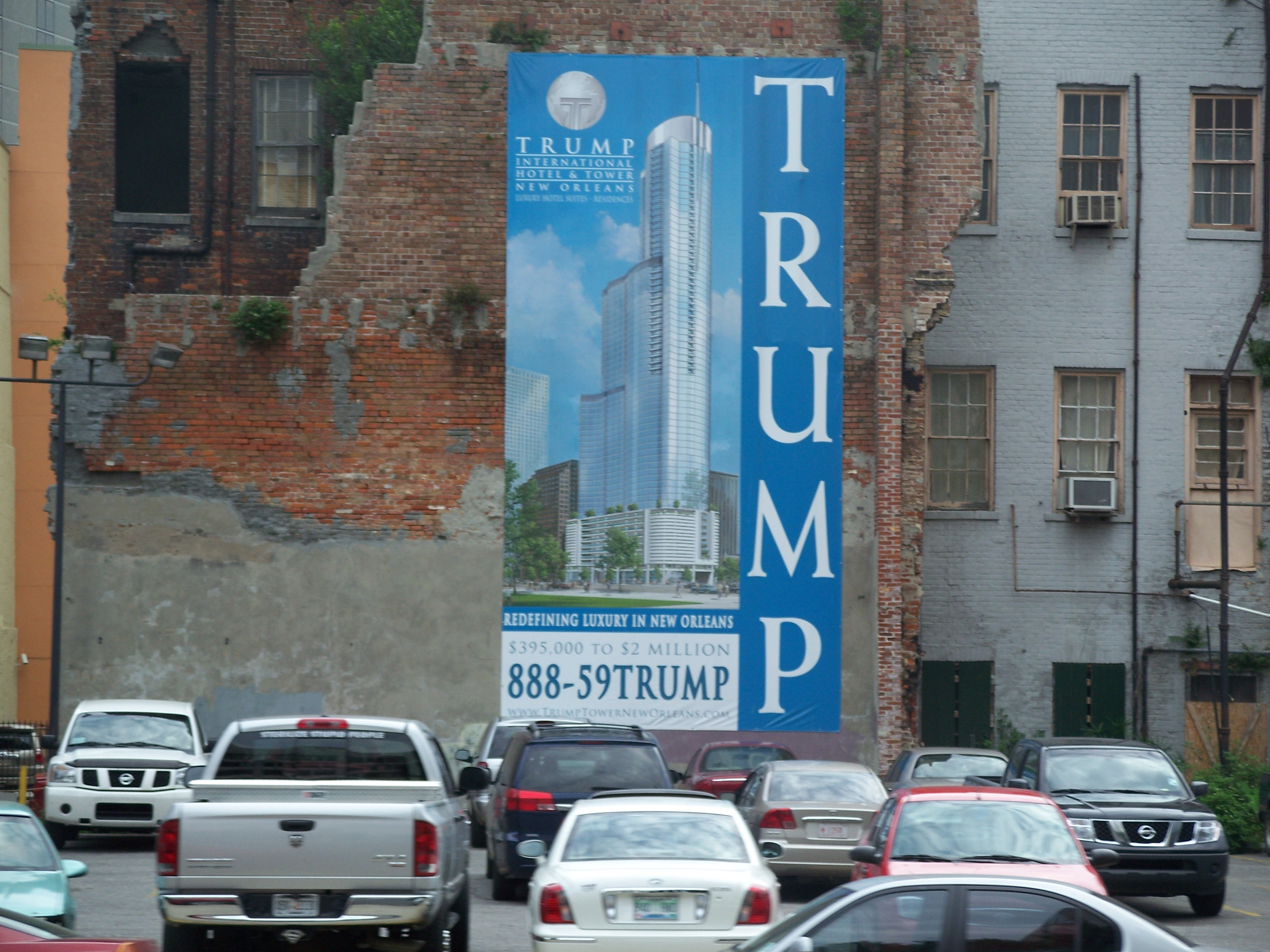
The proposed site of the new hotel as a parking lot in 2007

On August 26, 2005, the New Orleans Times-Picayune reported that a real estate deal appeared finalized for the first major construction project in the New Orleans CBD in 25 years, the Trump International Hotel and Tower New Orleans.

Initially, the project was slated to break ground early in 2006. The project, however, became quickly obscured by the events of Hurricane Katrina. Trump reaffirmed his support for the project shortly following the storm without setting a specific time line for construction. Local business leaders have hailed the move as a positive step in attracting business to the city.

On March 15, 2007, the New Orleans City Council officially approved the tower for construction.

The Times-Picayune reported on February 17, 2009 that the project is on hold pending the recovery of the national economy.

On 27 July 2011 the Times-Picayune reported the project to be officially dead, with the land sold at auction to a company intending to use it as a parking lot.

== Architecture ==
The design of the building is similar to other Trump tower projects, especially the completed Trump International Hotel and Tower in Chicago and Toronto.

== See also ==
- List of tallest buildings in New Orleans

== Sources ==
- Emporis.com
- NOLA.com
- trump.com
