= Ka Laʻi Waikīkī Beach Hotel =

Condo-hotel in Honolulu, Hawaii

Coordinates: 21°16′45″N 157°49′58″W

Ka Laʻi Waikīkī Beach
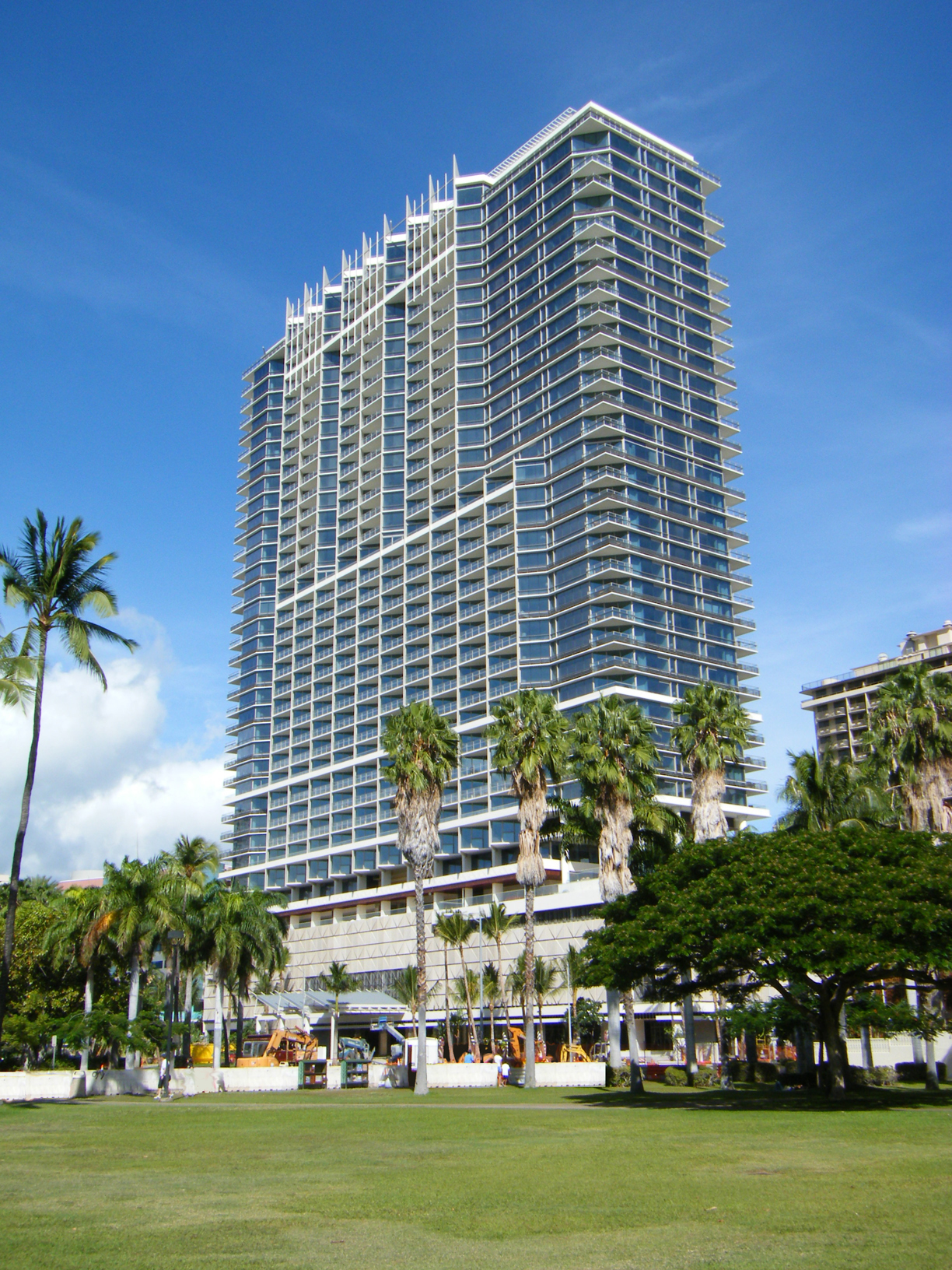

General information
- Status: Completed
- Type: Hotel, Condominium
- Architectural style: Post-modern
- Location: 223 Saratoga Rd. Waikiki, Honolulu, Hawaii, U.S.
- Construction started: July 2006
- Opening: November 16, 2009
- Cost: Not publicly known (Sold out at $700 million)

Height
- Roof: 380 feet (115.8 m)

Technical details
- Floor count: 38
- Floor area: 775,000 square feet (72,000 m^{2})

Design and construction
- Architects: Benjamin Woo Architects, LLC. Guerin Glass Architects
- Developer: Irongate AZREP LLC
- Structural engineer: Baldridge & Associates Structural Engineering, Inc.

Ka Laʻi Waikīkī Beach, formerly the Trump International Hotel Waikiki, is a condo-hotel in Honolulu, Hawaii. The hotel is part of the LXR Hotels & Resorts division of Hilton Hotels & Resorts. It is 350 ft (110 m) tall, 775,000 sq ft (72,000 m^{2}) tower with a total of about 462 units. The building includes a spa and dining space, as well as a fitness center, library, lobby bar, cafe, parking and 6th floor ocean view residential and hotel lobby.

== History ==
In 2005, Outrigger Hotels & Resorts was negotiating with several developers about a project for the site. Irongate, a Los Angeles-based real estate development and investment company, purchased the development rights for the property later that year. Donald Trump's company, The Trump Organization, later partnered with Irongate to develop a project on the site. On May 31, 2006, Trump announced plans for Trump International Hotel and Tower Waikiki Beach Walk, to be built on the property. Construction was to begin in early 2007, with completion planned for early 2009.

In July 2006, demolition of the Royal Islander and Reef Lanai hotels made room for Trump Waikiki. On November 10, 2006, almost three full years before completion, all 462 units were pre-sold in one day for a total of $700 million, or $1.5 million on average. The building opened on November 1, 2009, and by February 2010, 361 of the hotel-condominium's 462 units were still vacant due to "an internal matter with the financing of the building."

Although a part of the global Trump Hotels chain, the property was not owned by or developed by, and did not contain property sold by Donald Trump, The Trump Organization, or any of their affiliates. The hotel's owner, Irongate, licensed the Trump name from Trump Marks Waikiki LLC.

In November 2023, it was announced that the hotel, by then known as Trump International Hotel Waikiki, would rebrand in 2024 as part of Hilton Hotels & Resorts LXR Hotels & Resorts division, after the hotel's owners bought out a licensing agreement with the Trump Organization. The new name was announced as Wakea Waikiki Beach, for the god Wākea. Soon after, the name generated controversy in the Native Hawaiian community, with criticism of cultural appropriation. As a result, the hotel announced that a different name would be chosen.

The hotel was rebranded on February 7, 2024, as Ka Laʻi Waikiki Beach. It underwent a $100 million renovation in 2026.

== See also ==
- List of tallest buildings in Honolulu
