= Gary M. Green =

American journalist (born 20th cent.)

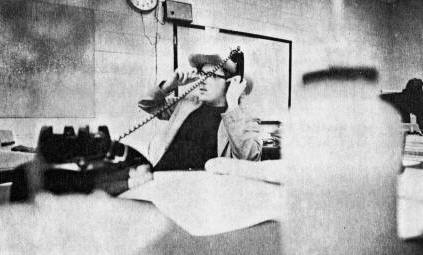
- Born: Hamlet, North Carolina, U.S.
- Occupations: Television host; gaming consultant; writer
- Known for: The Trump Organization, Casino Rescue TV show
- Notable work: "Osceola's Revenge", Marketing Donald Trump, Gambling Man

Gary M. Green (born 20th century) is a musician, author, television host, gaming consultant and entrepreneur.

He was vice president of marketing for The Trump Organization and appeared on the television reality game show The Apprentice. He was also on the 2004 television special New Year's Eve with Carson Daly. Green was executive vice president of Synergy Gaming, and the public face of the company. He was the spokesman for four years, until 2017 for Ortiz Gaming.

In 2016 it was announced that he would host a television series called "Casino Rescue".

== Career ==
=== Music ===
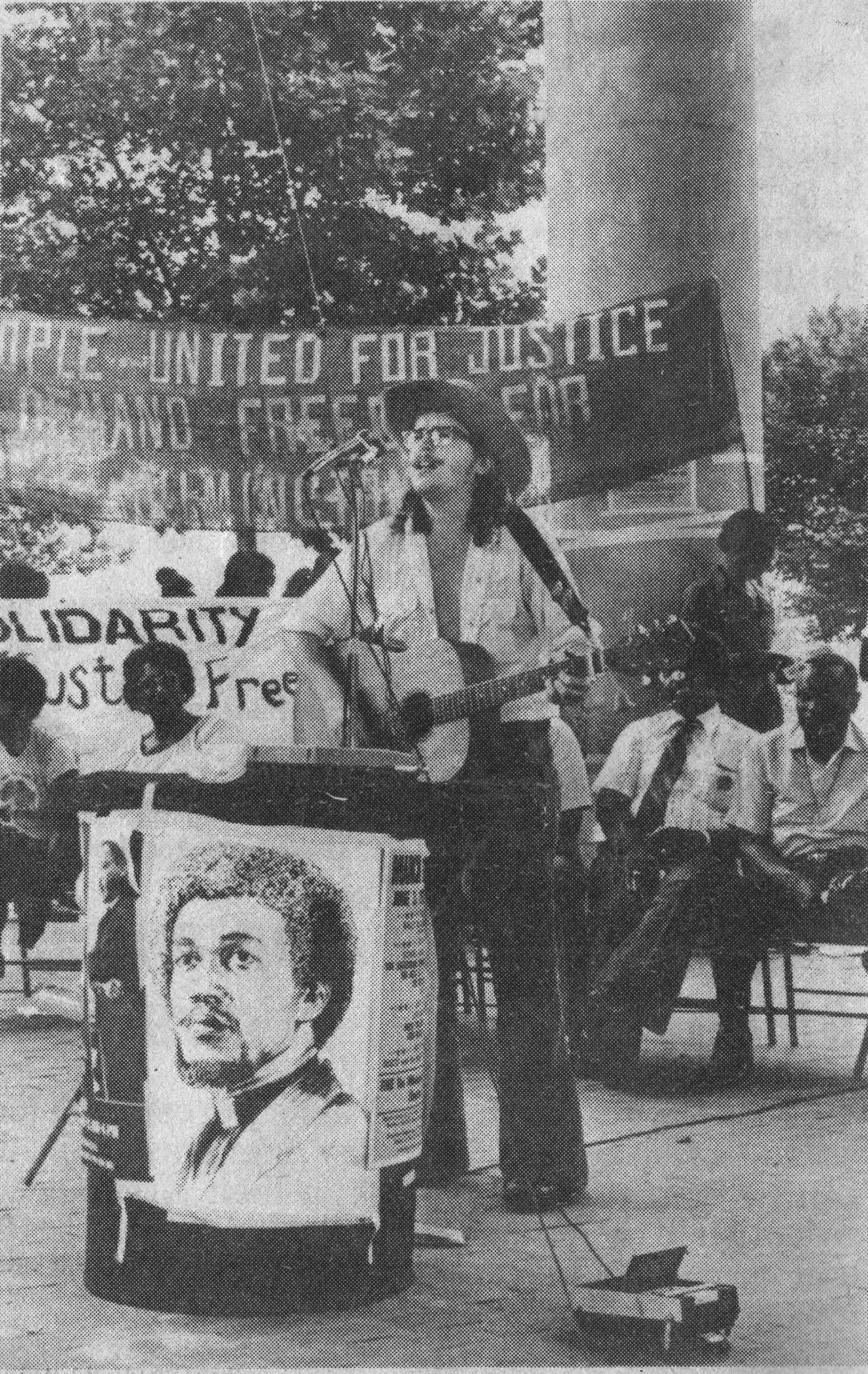
Gary Green Charlotte NC

Green recorded three folk-music albums from 1977 to 1982 with Folkways Records, which worked with other folk artists including Woody Guthrie and Pete Seeger. Folkways was later acquired by the Smithsonian Institution as part of the "Smithsonian Folkways" exhibition.

Green also composed music for the crime drama film Fort Apache, The Bronx (1981). The film, starring Paul Newman and Ed Asner, is about life in New York City's South Bronx from the point of view of a police officer.

=== Media ===
In the 1970s, Green was a journalist for The Gaston Gazette, a newspaper in Gastonia, North Carolina, which was later purchased by Halifax Media Group. He earned two Pulitzer Prize nominations for his writing.

In 2010, he wrote Marketing Donald Trump, a guide explaining how Green marketed Trump which can be applied to other marketing applications. In 2012, he wrote Gambling Man, which details Green's life as a modern-day casino boss through personal anecdotes.

=== Other activities ===
In the early 1990s, Green purchased part of a Russian circus. He established it as a Euro Circus attraction at Myrtle Beach, South Carolina. After he sold the circus, he joined Smith-Gardner, a Florida catalog software company. At Smith-Gardner, Green aided in development of software to take orders online when the company changed their focus from telephone and mail orders.

=== Casinos ===
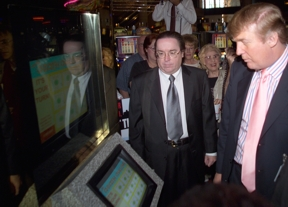
Gary Green and Donald Trump

By 1979, Green was working with casinos in Atlantic City, New Jersey. He patented a casino-management system based on customer relationships.

He was vice president of marketing for The Trump Organization and the Trump 29 Casino near Palm Springs, California.

Green was named president of Absentee Shawnee Gaming Enterprises in July 2004. He was general manager of the Thunderbird Wild Wild West Casino in Norman, Oklahoma and oversaw construction of another casino in Oklahoma City.

In 2005, Green co-founded Las Vegas-based casino management and development company Southern Dutch Gaming with Frank Haas, who he worked with at Trump 29.

Green was general manager of Glacier Peaks Casino in Browning, Montana, in 2006, and was hired by the Ottawa Tribe to oversee their new Four Winds Casino that same year and consulted for an Ottawa casino in Miami, Florida.

Synergy Gaming hired Green in 2009 as its executive vice president and official public face of the company. He purchased the former Gold Mine Casino in 2011. Green served for four years as spokesman and senior consultant to the president for Ortiz Gaming.

In 2025, Green purchased the Say When casino in McDermitt, Nevada and plans to turn it into a casino resort to serve the future Thacker Pass lithium mine.

== Discography ==
- Gary Green, Vol. 1: These Six Strings (1977)
- Gary Green, Vol. 2: Allegory (1977)
- Gary Green, Vol. 3: Still at Large (1982)

== Bibliography ==
- Marketing Donald Trump (2010, Penny Arcades)
- Gambling Man (2012, Penny Arcades)

== See also ==
- List of people from Florida
- List of people from Montana
- List of people from North Carolina
- List of people from New Jersey
- List of people from Montana
- List of people from Las Vegas
- List of people from Norman, Oklahoma
- List of people from Palm Springs, California
