= Trump Towers Rio =

- Interactive map of the Trump Towers Rio area

General information
- Status: Delayed
- Type: Office complex Mixed-use
- Location: Avenida Francisco Bicalho, Rio de Janeiro, Brazil
- Coordinates: 22.90287°S 43.20881°W
- Cost: $2.5 billion

Height
- Height: 492 ft (150 m)

Technical details
- Floor count: 38

Design and construction
- Architecture firm: Aflalo & Gasperini Arquitetos
- Developer: MRP International

Website
- www.trumptowersrio.com

Trump Towers Rio was a proposed five-tower office and mixed-use complex that was to be built in Rio de Janeiro, Brazil. The project was announced in 2012, and was to be developed by MRP International. The project was named after Donald Trump as part of a licensing deal through his company, The Trump Organization. Each tower was to stand 38 stories high; if built, Trump Towers Rio would have become the largest office complex in Brazil.

Construction on the first two towers was initially scheduled to begin in the second half of 2013, with completion in time for the city's hosting of the 2016 Summer Olympics. Construction never commenced, and was initially delayed while the project awaited government approval. As of 2017, The Trump Organization was no longer involved with the project and there were no plans to begin construction in the near future.

== History ==
In December 2012, The Trump Organization announced plans for Trump Towers Rio, an office complex project consisting of five 38-floor towers to be built in Rio de Janeiro, Brazil. Upon completion, the project would feature a total of 4,800,000 sq ft (450,000 m^{2}), and would stand 492 feet. If built, Trump Towers Rio would be the largest office complex in Brazil. The Trump Organization did not intend to invest any money in the project, which was expected to cost $2.5 billion. The project was to be developed by Bulgarian-based MRP International, with financing from Salamanca Group and developer Even Construtora e Incorporadora SA. Salamanca would also manage the project upon its opening. The project's name was licensed by Donald Trump through The Trump Organization.

The mixed-use project was designed by Aflalo & Gasperini Arquitetos, and was to include restaurants, shops, and gyms. The project would also include a rainwater capturing system and an on-site wastewater treatment plant. Each tower was to include terraces on each floor that would be covered with plants. The front of each tower would include a triangular zig-zag pattern, inspired by the Copacabana boardwalk and shoreline. The patterns would serve as integrated louvers to reflect sunlight.

The rectangular site for the proposed project, measuring 1,968 feet by 164 feet, was located on Avenida Francisco Bicalho, in the city's Santo Cristo's neighborhood, the northwestern outskirt of downtown Rio. The area was part of the city's dilapidated Port Zone, which underwent numerous refurbishments ahead of the city's 2016 Summer Olympics, as part of a revitalization effort known as Projeto Porto Maravilha (Project Marvelous Port). People in the local community stated that the government did not consult them about Projeto Porto Maravilha, except to inform them of their displacement. Projeto Porto Maravilha was expected to displace more than 1,000 people. Donald Trump Jr., who was overseeing the Trump Towers project, said about locals' concerns, "What this will do for Rio is going to be so positive that any rational individual will realize this will totally outweigh any of those negatives. It's an industrial area that no one wanted to touch for years and years and years".

=== Construction delays ===
At the time of the project's announcement, construction on its first two towers was to begin in the second half of 2013; they were expected to be completed in time for the 2016 Summer Olympics. Construction of the other three towers was dependent on market conditions. In March 2013, the developers were still awaiting approvals from the Brazilian government. Donald Trump Jr. expected that at least one of the five towers would be completed in time for the Olympic Games. In April 2013, MRP International announced that Engineering SA would monitor construction and provide procurement advisory services for the project.

By May 2013, construction was expected to begin in the first quarter of 2014, as some permits had not yet been issued for the project. Stefan Ivanov, MRP's chief executive for Brazil, was not concerned about a recent decline in the local office market. In January 2014, it was announced that construction of the first two towers would begin in the second half of the year, with completion expected in 2017. At that time, Odebrecht SA was being considered as the project's general contractor. Ivanov also stated that Even Construtora may ultimately construct some of the towers. Donald Trump Jr. confirmed that the project would be the largest urban office complex in the BRIC countries, and stated, "There is a tremendous need for a project of this size and caliber as Rio de Janeiro has one of the lowest office vacancy rates in the world."

Fifty families were displaced as their houses were demolished to make room for the new Trump complex. A previously abandoned warehouse that was later inhabited legally by several families was also demolished for the project, in February 2014. The families were promised public housing by the government, although they had yet to receive it as of September 2016.

=== Investigation and further postponement ===
In September 2016, a Brazilian federal investigation known as Project Greenfield was launched to look into claims that state agencies were involved in illegal favoritism when they were selecting which projects to financially support for Projeto Porto Maravilha. The following month, Brazilian officials announced that they were investigating the Trump Towers Rio project, and whether The Trump Organization and MRP benefited illegally by receiving support from public bank Caixa Econômica Federal. The Trump Organization stated that the company "is not the owner or developer of Trump Towers Rio and, accordingly, has no knowledge whatsoever regarding any governmental inquiry involving the project."

In November 2016, there was no construction activity on the site for the proposed project, which was occupied by a samba school known as Unidos da Tijuca, as well as a Municipal Guards depot. Officials from the school stated that they had not received notice about construction or having to relocate. As of February 2017, groundbreaking had yet to begin and the area surrounding the property remained derelict, unlike the rest of the Port Zone. By that time, The Trump Organization was no longer involved with the project, and the towers' sole leasing agency, Cushman & Wakefield, stated that there were no plans to begin building the project in the near future.
