= LSH Hotel =

On-going hotel project in Rio de Janeiro, Brazil

- Interactive map of the LSH Hotel area
- Former names: Trump Hotel Rio de Janeiro

General information
- Status: 60 percent complete (March 2017)
- Type: Hotel
- Architectural style: Modern
- Location: Rua Professor Coutinho Fróis, 10, Rio de Janeiro, Brazil
- Coordinates: 23.012707°S 43.316632°W
- Opened: August 4, 2016
- Cost: $120 million (2015 estimate)
- Owner: LSH Barra Empreendimentos Imobiliários SA

Technical details
- Floor count: 13

Design and construction
- Architecture firm: Wimberly Allison Tong & Goo (WATG)
- Developer: LSH Barra Empreendimentos Imobiliários SA

Other information
- Number of units: 171 (planned)

Website
- www.lshhotel.net

The LSH Hotel, formerly the Trump Hotel Rio de Janeiro, is a hotel in Rio de Janeiro, Brazil. The hotel was announced in 2014, as a joint project between Donald Trump's company, The Trump Organization, and LSH Barra, a Brazilian-based developer.

A portion of the hotel opened in August 2016, in time for the city's 2016 Summer Olympics. Later that year, a Brazilian prosecutor began investigating two small pension funds that contributed a total of $40 million to the project. The Trump Organization subsequently ended its management agreement with LHS Barra due to construction delays, and the hotel was renamed as the LHS Barra Hotel shortly thereafter.

== History ==
In 2014, Paulo Figueiredo Filho, the chief executive officer of Brazilian-based development company LSH Barra, signed a licensing and management deal with Donald Trump's company, The Trump Organization, for a beachfront hotel project in Rio de Janeiro, Brazil, to be named Trump Hotel Rio de Janeiro. Figueiredo, a grandson of former Brazilian president João Figueiredo, would own the hotel, while The Trump Organization would operate it. Figueiredo said that by boasting of his connection to Brazil's former president, he got Trump interested in having his company manage the hotel property. The Trump Organization did not financially invest in the project.

The hotel was announced in January 2014. The architect was Wimberly Allison Tong & Goo (WATG), while interior designs were created by Rockwell Group. The 13-story hotel was to include 171 rooms. The modern, triangular-shaped structure would include jagged, terraced suites that would face the Atlantic Ocean. The hotel would also include an infinity pool that would be made of glass and would be built above a nightclub capable of holding 600 people.

=== Construction and opening ===
By August 2015, construction was underway on the project, which was expected to cost $120 million and was scheduled to open in time for the city's 2016 Summer Olympics. In court, Trump unsuccessfully attempted to receive tax breaks from Brazil for the project, as the International Olympic Committee had insisted that the local government provide an additional 10,000 hotel rooms for the Olympic Games.

Filho resigned his executive position at LSH Barra in March 2016, but retained a financial stake in the Trump Hotel project. Construction was still underway in April 2016, with crews rushing to finish the hotel in time for the Olympic Games. Olympic officials informed seven international sports federations of their concerns that the hotel would not be finished on time for their arrival.

Parts of the Trump Hotel opened on August 4, 2016, the night before the Olympic Games began. At that time, the hotel was less than half finished, with only the bottom four floors open to guests, while the remaining floors were only partially complete. The property's 4,000 sq ft (370 m^{2}) nightclub was also unfinished. The remaining hotel rooms and a convention center were scheduled for completion in 2017. During the Olympic Games, the hotel was reserved for International Olympic Committee members.

The hotel is located in the Barra da Tijuca and Jardim Oceânico neighborhoods, near the Barra Olympic Park and Athletes' Village. The hotel was part of the Trump Hotel Collection and was the first in the collection to open in South America. The hotel, estimated to be worth at least $75 million, was managed by The Trump Organization. Trump was estimated to make $25 million per year from the property.

=== Investigation and name change ===
On October 21, 2016, Brazilian prosecutor Anselmo Lopes launched an investigation after two small pension funds made large investments totaling $40 million to LSH Barra. Lopes stated, "Investing amounts of such size, for these (relatively small) pension funds, breaks principles for diversification and liquidity. It is necessary to verify if the favoritism shown by the pension funds towards LSH Barra Empreendimentos Imobiliários SA and The Trump Organization was due to illicit payments and bribes." One pension fund also purchased debt that was linked to LSH Barra, which was considered "highly suspicious."

Alan Garten, executive vice president and general counsel for The Trump Organization, said the company had not been informed of the investigation and was not involved with the pension funds. Garten further stated, "In time, I think the investigator will realize that these types of things wouldn't involve us and don't involve us." LSH Barra denied wrongdoing and agreed to aid the investigation, while stating, "We regret being connected to acts and procedures that we know nothing about and never participated in."

On December 13, 2016, The Trump Organization announced that it would end its agreement to manage the hotel, a decision that would become effective two days later. A company spokeswoman said, "Unfortunately, the developers of the Rio de Janeiro hotel are significantly behind on the completion of the property, and their vision for the hotel no longer aligns with the Trump Hotels brand." Two days later, the Trump name was removed from the building. By that time, only 60 percent of the hotel's rooms were finished.

By February 2017, the property had been renamed as LSH Barra Hotel. That month, it was reported that the hotel "seems to be struggling" and that, "A flashy restaurant in the property is regularly all-but-deserted, even on weekend nights." As of March 2017, the project remained 40 percent incomplete.
