= Millennium Tower (Frankfurt) =

Future skyscraper, completion in 2030

- Interactive map of the Millennium Tower area

General information
- Status: Under construction
- Type: Mixed-use
- Location: Güterplatz; Frankfurt; Hessen, Germany
- Coordinates: 50°06′34″N 8°39′20″E
- Construction started: 2025
- Estimated completion: 2030

Height
- Roof: 288 m (945 ft)
- Observatory: 266 m (873 ft)

Technical details
- Floor count: 67
- Lifts/elevators: 21

Design and construction
- Architect: Ferdinand Heide
- Developer: CA Immo

The Millennium Tower is a planned skyscraper whose construction will start in 2025. When completed in 2030, it will be the European Union's second tallest building and Germany's tallest building. It will contain Germany's tallest observation deck with a panoramic view over Frankfurt. The tower will have a height of 288 m (945 ft) and 67 stories. The architect of the tower is Ferdinand Heide and the client is CA Immo.

== History ==
The first plans of the Millennium tower were introduced in 1998. The plans proposed a tower with a height of 369 m (1,211 ft)

The client was EIM (Eisenbahn Immobilien Management) and the concept was created by Albert Speer & Partner, as a component of the high-rise master plan of Frankfurt in 1998.

The design and engineering of the DMC Landmark Building was performed by Albert Speer Jr. The building was to house an observation deck on 70th floor at 260 m (853 ft), from which visitors will be able to see the entire metropolis of Frankfurt and it would have been the tallest building in Europe at that time. It would have been an observation deck less high than those of Willis Tower on the 103rd floor at 412 m (1,352 ft) and the 102nd floor of the Empire State Building at 381 m (1,250 ft). Five-star hotels would have been located on the 85th–102nd floors, surpassing the Shangri-La Hotel (34th–52nd floors) in the Shard, as the highest hotel rooms in the European country. All functions of a futuristic, 21st century city were to be incorporated into the building, including the most luxurious office and residential spaces, a department store, luxury shopping malls, a large convention center, and the subway underground that connects to the building.

By the end of 2000, Donald Trump stated that he would plan to make the Millennium Tower the tallest residential skyscraper worldwide and started the TD Trump Deutschland AG as a corporate venture with the German company Marseille-Kliniken. TD Trump Deutschland was dissolved in 2005 and several lawsuits followed.

On the real estate exhibition Cityscape, which took place in Dubai, the project was presented as cubic model in October 2007.

With the property owned by Vivico Real Estate GmbH, the Millennium Tower would be located in the Gallus district, just east of Messe Frankfurt near the business quarter development Europaviertel. An official construction permit was granted in May 2001.

It could be marketed as the European headquarters for global companies. Due to the economic crisis starting in 2008, marketing efforts for the tower were reduced. The general situation of the real estate market improved in the early 2010s and neighbouring projects are in the process of realisation, with completion of the Millennium Tower becoming more likely again.

== See also ==
- List of tallest buildings in Frankfurt
- List of tallest buildings in Europe
