= Jose Roberto Antonio =

Filipino real estate developer and businessman

Robbie Antonio
- Born: Jose Roberto Antonio; 1977 (age 48–49)
- Education: Stanford Graduate School of Business & Northwestern University
- Occupation: Real Estate Developer
- Website: https://robbie-antonio.com

Jose Roberto "Robbie" Antonio (born 1977) is a Filipino businessman and real estate developer. He is the son of José E. B. Antonio, one of the Philippines' 40 richest people.

== Education ==
Antonio attended Northwestern University where he got a first degree in economics and pursued his MBA at the Stanford Graduate School of Business.

== Career ==
Antonio, along with Pei Partnership, developed Centurion in New York City.

=== Revolution Precrafted ===
Antonio is also the producer of Revolution Precrafted, a Manila-based series of prefabricated structures by other designers such as Tom Dixon, Daniel Libeskind, Sou Fujimoto, and Lenny Kravitz. Revolution Precrafted was recognized as the first ‘Unicorn’ startup in the Philippines, in 2017.

In the Philippines, Antonio is the founder and CEO of Resident Holdings Group. Antonio is also the founder of Resident Branding, it was founded in 2019 and has partnered with local and international personalities who create their own brand of products and services. Renegade worked with Senator Emmanual “Manny” D. Pacquiao, Jinkee Pacquiao, and others.

In February 2020, Nikkei Group publication DealStreetAsia published a two-piece investigative report on Revolution Precrafted.

According to DealStreetAsia citing sources, Antonio sought to raise from several venture capitalists in order to bolster its "unicorn" valuation. In an email exchange seen by DealStreetAsia, Antonio tried to raise $1–3 million at a $1.85 billion valuation in 2017. Revolution Precrafted also showed little progress in the delivery of its multi-million dollar luxury prefab projects in Manila, which include Flavorscapes at Lakeshore in Pampanga province; Revolution Hills in Rizal province; and Batulao Artscapes in Batangas, which was being developed with Century Properties.

In February 2021, Antonio stepped down from the board of Century Properties amidst a National Bureau of Investigation probe on financial woes allegations against Revolution Precrafted. However, the complaint and investigation was later dismissed due to no probable cause.

== Personal life ==
Antonio is an art collector. In 2013, his 25,000 square foot Manila home was completed. The house, which Antonio named "Stealth", was designed by Dutch architect Rem Koolhaas and includes a dedicated private gallery of portraits he has commissioned of himself by famous artists.

A profile by Vanity Fair commented on the extreme disparity between Antonio's wealth and the average income of the Philippines. In a 2013 op-ed in the Manila Times, the article claimed that the Antonio family was on the Forbes list of top 40 wealthiest Filipinos and that they were not listed in the top 500 taxpayers of BIR's. The author characterized Antonio's personal spending on vanity projects and relatively modest philanthropic spending as indicative of inequality in the Philippines where the average family income in 2013 was $4,988.

BIR records show that the Antonios were among the top 500 taxpayers in the Philippines in 2012 and 2013.

He was a board director of Operation Smile Philippines when it was unveiled in 2012 by Donald Trump Jr. and Eric Trump, executive vice presidents of The Trump Organization.
