= Trump Mortgage =

Defunct financial services company

Trump Mortgage LLC
- Industry: Financial
- Founded: July 2003 (Trump Mortgage Services); April 2005 (Trump Mortgage LLC)
- Defunct: August 2007
- Fate: Defunct
- Headquarters: 40 Wall Street, New York City, New York, United States
- Areas served: 25 U.S. states (September 2006)
- Key people: E. J. Ridings (president and chief executive officer)
- Services: Mortgage broker
- Website: Official website (archived)

Trump Mortgage LLC was an American financial services company named after businessman and 45th & 47th President of the United States Donald Trump and headquartered in New York. Trump had initially announced the launch of Trump Mortgage Services in July 2003. Trump Mortgage LLC was later formed in April 2005, and had a limited opening in November 2005, before officially launching in April 2006.

E.J. Ridings served as the company's president and chief executive officer. Ridings, who devised the idea for the company, was an acquaintance of Trump's son, Donald Trump Jr., who introduced Ridings to his father. As of September 2006, Trump Mortgage was licensed in 25 states and stated that it was the fastest-growing commercial and residential mortgage company in the United States.

The company's closure was announced on August 5, 2007, as the result of a poor economy and Ridings' exaggeration of his credentials. Experts also believed that the company expanded too quickly. By the time of the closure announcement, Trump had agreed to license his name to First Meridian Mortgage, which was temporarily renamed as Trump Finance in some areas before reverting to its original name after a few years.

== History ==
I knew in my heart and soul that Trump Mortgage can make a difference in this gigantic industry. The financial opportunity is huge—but there is more. Not only will we make money, but it is a humanitarian venture as well. We have created a safe haven where people can get the best deal on a residential or commercial mortgage without worrying about all the hidden clauses.

— E. J. Ridings, Trump University Entrepreneurship 101

In July 2003, businessman Donald Trump announced the formation of Trump Mortgage Services, a mortgage broker for his own projects and other commercial development projects. Trump Mortgage LLC was later formed in April 2005. In November 2005, the company held a limited opening at Trump's 40 Wall Street building, where the company was headquartered on its own floor as part of The Trump Organization's headquarters. Approximately $25 million in loans was arranged in February 2006, primarily in New York. As of March 2006, the brokerage was licensed in several states, with nationwide licensing expected in the next few months.

E.J. Ridings, the president and chief executive officer of Trump Mortgage, said the company planned to acquire warehouse lines, allowing it to fund loans by itself by the end of 2006. Ridings expected to originate $3 billion in real estate financing for 2006, although he later expected less than $1 billion. Ridings, who devised the idea for the company, was an acquaintance of Donald Trump Jr., who introduced Ridings to his father.

Donald Trump announced the official launch of Trump Mortgage LLC on April 5, 2006, during an event at Trump Tower in New York. That month, Trump appeared on CNBC and said, "I think it's a great time to start a mortgage company [...] the real estate market is going to be very strong for a long time to come." In his autobiography Trump 101: The Way to Success Trump writes, "I expect [Trump Mortgage] to be an effective company, and it makes sense. A lot of things I am doing now are things I thought of but had to postpone until the time was right." Within the first six months of its operation, six top executives left the company. Lee Bienstock, a contestant on the fifth season of Trump's reality television series, The Apprentice, became associate vice president of corporate development in August 2006.

On September 11, 2006, it was announced that Trump Mortgage had become licensed in 25 states. The company stated that it was the fastest-growing commercial and residential mortgage company in the country. In December 2006, Ridings reiterated an earlier statement in which he believed that the company would be doing $100 billion in annual loans in five to 10 years; he considered this to be "extremely likely." Later that month, it was reported that Ridings had exaggerated and invented items on his resume. Although Ridings stated that he was "a top professional at one of Wall Street's most prestigious investment banks," he had worked at Morgan Stanley for only three months, and had worked at Dean Witter Reynolds for six days as a stockbroker. According to former Trump Mortgage manager Jan Scheck, who left the company after one year, Ridings lacked leadership.

On August 5, 2007, it was announced that the company would close because of a poor economic market and Ridings' exaggerated credentials. Some experts believed that the company also failed because it expanded too quickly. Donald Trump stated that he did not have ownership in the company and that his role was limited to a name licensing deal. Trump also said, "The mortgage business is not a business I particularly liked or wanted to be part of in a very big way." On the same day, it was announced that Trump would license his name to First Meridian Mortgage, a mortgage lender licensed in 12 states. Under the deal, First Meridian Mortgage was renamed as Trump Financial in most of the areas where it operated. After a few years, Trump Financial closed and the company reverted to its original name. David Brecher, the president of First Meridian, blamed bad timing for the demise of Trump Financial.

== Unpaid payments ==
Jennifer McGovern, a former employee of Trump Mortgage, brokered a $26,500,000 financing, which earned more than $500,000 in commissions for Trump Mortgage. Trump Mortgage collected their commission, but stiffed McGovern, who filed a lawsuit. In 2009, McGovern obtained a judgment of US$298,274 against Trump Mortgage. As of March 2016, the judgment remains unsatisfied. A U.S. Department of the Treasury tax lien was implemented on Trump Mortgage in 2009 for US$3,555 in unpaid taxes.

== See also ==
- List of things named after Donald Trump
