= Trump Tower Punta del Este =

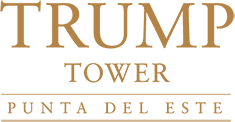

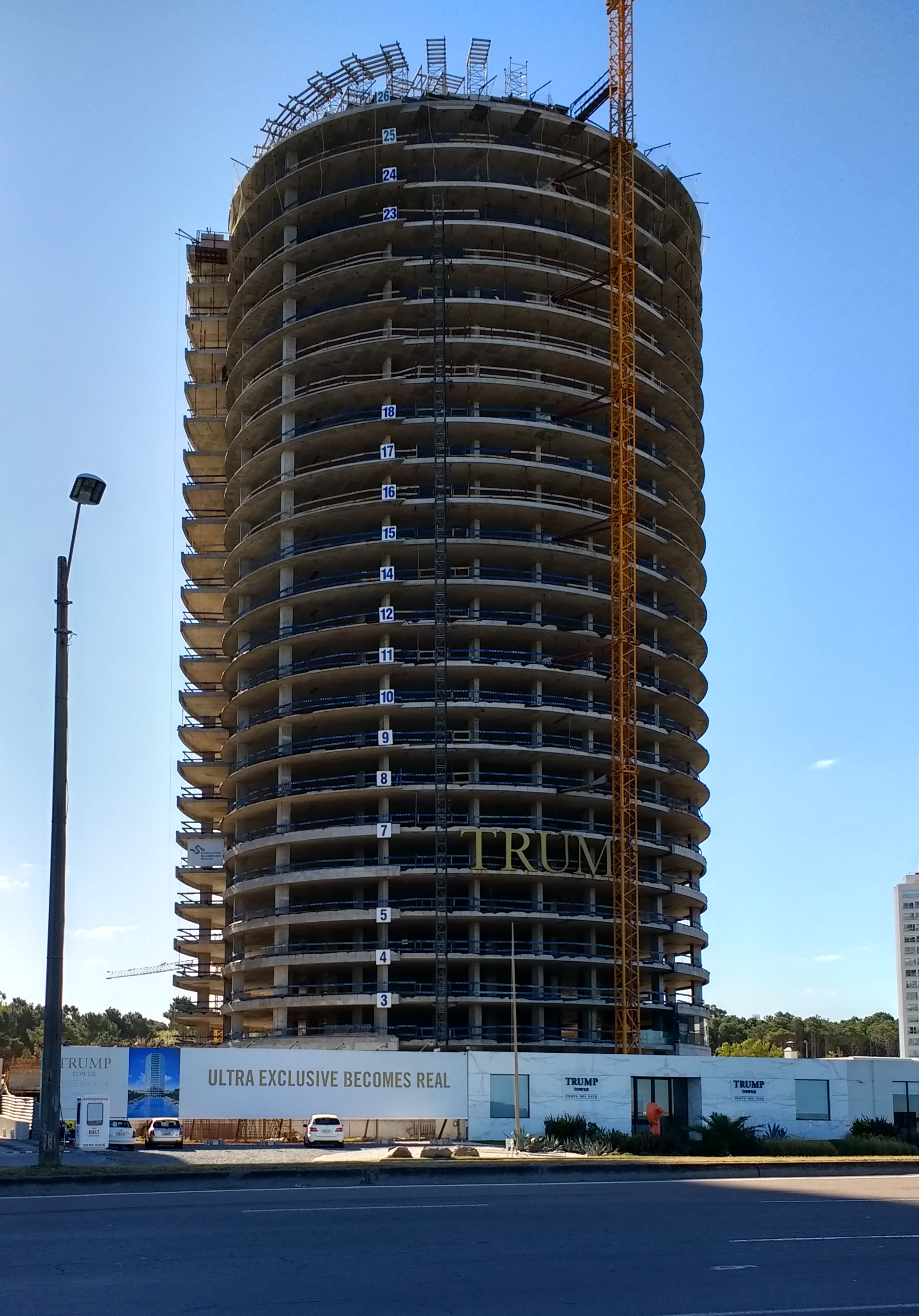
- Trump Tower during construction (April 2017)

General information
- Status: Completed
- Type: Apartments
- Location: Rambla Lorenzo Batlle Pacheco, Parada 9, Punta del Este, Uruguay
- Coordinates: 34°56′46″S 54°55′22″W
- Construction started: January 2014
- Completed: October, 2022
- Opened: 2024
- Cost: $120 million

Height
- Height: 279 ft (85 m)

Technical details
- Floor count: 26
- Lifts/elevators: 10

Design and construction
- Architecture firm: Dujovne-Hirsch & Associates
- Developer: YY Development Group
- Main contractor: YY Development Group

Other information
- Number of units: 156

Website
- trumppuntadeleste.com

Trump Tower Punta del Este is a 26-story luxury apartment tower in Punta del Este, Uruguay. The project was announced in November 2012, and YY Development Group began construction in January 2014. The tower is named after Donald Trump, and was overseen by his son, Eric Trump. It was originally scheduled for completion in 2016 but was postponed; construction was held up by legal and funding issues. Progress on the project stopped in October 2019, but its construction was recovered in November 2020, through a trust formed by its owners. The building opened in October 2022.

== History ==
Trump Tower Punta del Este was announced by Donald Trump at his Manhattan Trump Tower on November 28, 2012. It would be the first South American project for Trump's recently formed brokerage firm, Trump International Realty. Trump had previously discussed possible projects for South America, including Brazil, but such projects had never materialized up to that time.

Trump was involved in the project through a licensing agreement that would allow the building to use his surname. From the deal, Trump was to earn royalties of $100,000 to $1 million. The circular-shaped building, located along Playa Brava Beach and designed by Dujovne-Hirsch & Associates, was initially planned to include 23 floors and 125 apartment units, with prices ranging from $700,000 to $2.5 million. The project's target market was wealthy residents of Buenos Aires, Argentina; São Paulo, Brazil; and New York.

Argentina-based YY Development Group, consisting of business partners Felipe Yaryura and Moisés Yellati, would finance the project and handle development and construction, while groundbreaking was expected to occur within three months. Construction was scheduled to begin in May 2013, with completion scheduled for three years later. Yaryura, along with approximately 40 other investors, financed $20 million into the project around the time of the announcement. Trump Tower Punta del Este was expected to cost $100 million, and was the first project for YY Development to be located outside of Argentina.

=== Construction ===
Construction began in January 2014, and was scheduled for completion in 2016. Construction began a year behind schedule due to poor apartment sales in the building, prompting YY Development to reduce the project's units in size and price. YY Development had sought tax breaks through a Uruguayan government program that was meant to improve the country's construction industry, but the company was turned down because the project began prior to the introduction of the program. Construction initially consisted of excavation work, to remove 5,000 cubic meters of rocky ground. The project was overseen by Trump's son, Eric Trump, an executive vice president for Trump International. Eric Trump described the project as "The Hamptons of South America," and frequently visited the site during construction to check on its progress. A change in internal directors, as well as modifications of the floor plans, delayed completion of the project beyond its initial 2016 date. As of March 2016, 60 percent of the project's units had been sold, with occupancy expected for December 2017.

As of July 2016, construction had reached the 16th floor, while the project had 150 workers. Construction was expected to reach the 22nd floor during the local summer time, while a total of 500 workers were expected to be working on the project once additional work such as electrical was required. Occupancy was scheduled for late 2018. By October 2016, construction had reached the 20th floor. On December 9, 2016, the property was evacuated due to a bomb threat that turned out to be false.

After Donald Trump's victory in the 2016 U.S. presidential election, apartment prices in the tower increased 30 to 35 percent, ranging from $550,000 to $8 million. It is the last Trump-branded tower under construction following Trump's electoral victory. A ground-level billboard featuring a large photo of Donald Trump's face had been located in front of the project during construction. The billboard was a popular attraction among tourists who would have their photo taken with Trump's face.

By January 2017, the billboard of Trump's face had been removed. Eric Trump – who took over The Trump Organization with his brother, Donald Trump Jr. – explained that his father "is completely getting out of the business to become commander in chief of the United States." A photo of Donald Trump and his three adult children, located in the building's showroom, was also removed. Juan Jose Cugliandolo, the chief executive officer of YY Development Group, said that the photos were removed at the request of Donald Trump, and further stated, "The reality is obviously that becoming president of the United States does not fit with putting his photo on a real estate development."

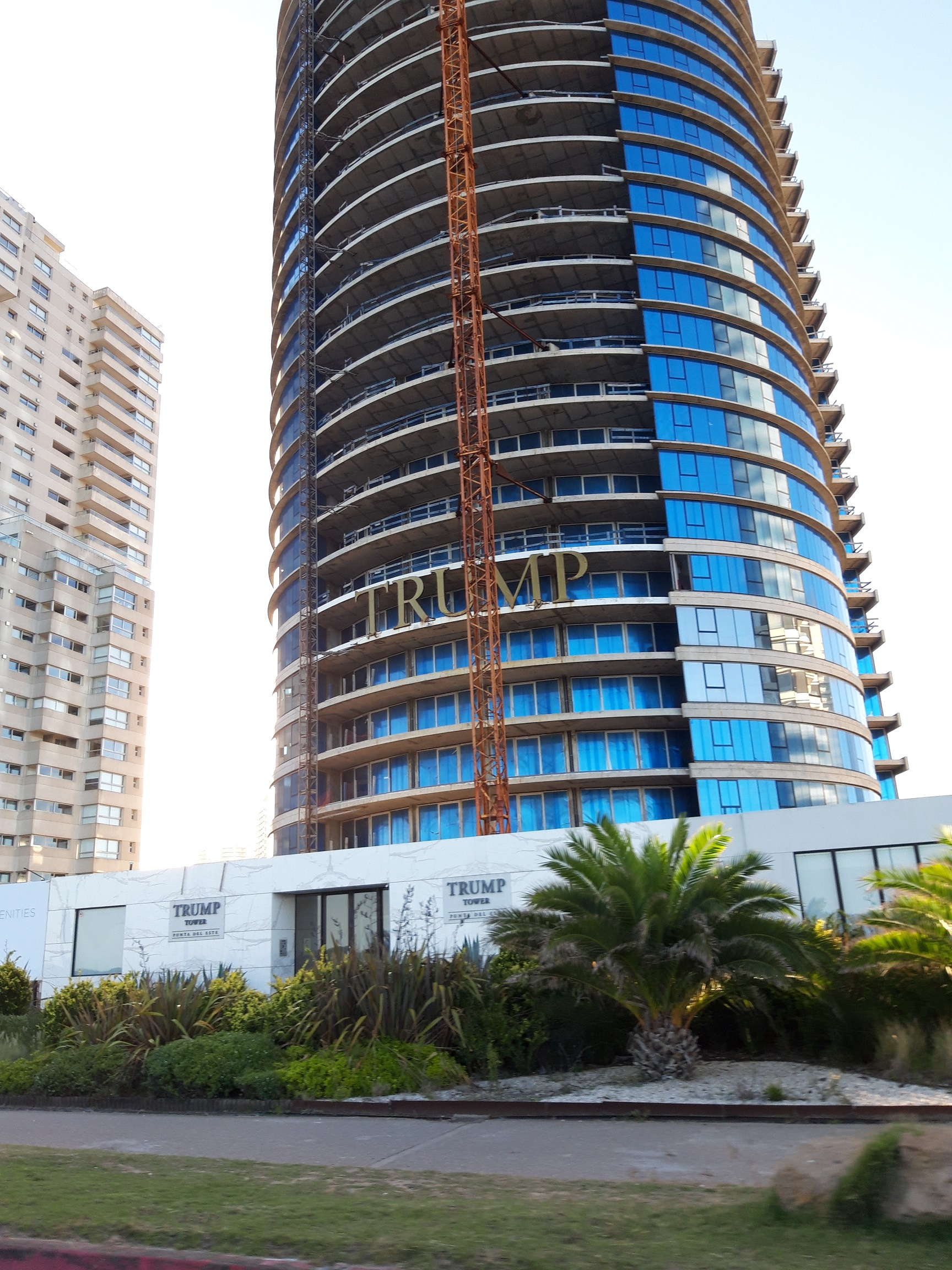
Unfinished building in March 2021

As of January 2017, construction had reached the 25th floor of the 26-story tower. Each floor remained a concrete skeleton of framework, while completion was scheduled for late 2018. The project will include 154 apartments and two penthouses, and is being built at a cost of $120 million. As of June 2018, the project was expected to be complete in early 2020. In June 2019, construction was barely proceeding as the project had less than a quarter of necessary workers on the job. Completion was then expected for late 2020, although there were doubts that the project would meet its latest date. The project eventually ran out of money, and construction was halted in October 2019. Upon completion, the tower was estimated to stand 279 feet.

== Amenities ==
Trump Tower Punta del Este will include 107,500 sq ft (9,990 m^{2}) of amenities, including a two-story marble lobby, two movie theaters, a gym, indoor and outdoor pools, a spa and sauna, a restaurant, a wine cellar, a cigar lounge, a market, climate-controlled tennis courts, conference rooms, and a heliport located atop the tower. The tower will also include eight high-speed elevators, as well as two service elevators. Each apartment tenant will receive an iPad computer that is used to make requests such as food delivery or to have their vehicle dropped off by valet at the entrance.
