= Video bingo =

Type of gambling machine

Video bingo, or electronic bingo machine, is a type of slot machine or amusement-with-prize machine (AWP) which instead of the typical reel-style game play, one or more bingo cards can be played on the machine.

== Classes and styles ==
Video bingo machines come in both Class II and Class III formats, and it is not a reference to the Class II bingo machine which refers to the software legality. Because, it is not exclusive to Class II gaming it is sometimes referred to as a theme game among slot manufacturers.

== Regulation ==
Video bingo machines in casinos in the United States are regulated by state or Indian gaming agencies. Since video bingo machines are available in Class II and Class III formats, they are subject to the Indian Gaming Regulatory Act. Also, the exploitation and licensing of the video bingo machines are regulated separately by local state law. According to the Louisiana Chapter RS 4:724, Video Bingo machines are available to the public, and these machines should meet the list of requirements to prize size, license type and locations allowed for placement. According to legislation of North Carolina Video Poker and Video Bingo machines became illegal as of July 1, 2007. It is prohibited also to store and manufacture such machines at the state territory.

== Manufacturers ==
Slot manufacturers operating in the United States which sell video bingo slot machines include Zitro.
