= Matthew Calamari =

American business executive and security officer

Matthew F. Calamari Sr. is an American business executive and security officer serving as the chief operating officer of The Trump Organization. He was previously its director of security and a personal bodyguard of Donald Trump.

== Career ==
Calamari graduated from New York Institute of Technology in 1979. He was a college linebacker. Through his coach, he took a temporary security position during the 1981 US Open. During the semifinals between Chris Evert and Martina Navratilova, Calamari removed hecklers from the venue, impressing Donald Trump.

Calamari joined The Trump Organization initially as a security officer. In the early 1990s, he was promoted to security director of Trump Tower. He later became the director of security and served as Trump's personal bodyguard. He appeared on three episodes of The Apprentice. Calamari was promoted to chief operating officer. He oversees building management, construction, and insurance. He briefly worked on the Donald Trump 2016 presidential campaign. In 2021, Calamari was investigated by the New York County District Attorney regarding if he had paid taxes on company benefits including a funded apartment and car. He was not charged.

== Personal life ==
Calamari's son, Matthew Calamari Jr. joined the Trump Organization in 2011 and was promoted to director of security in 2016. He has owned an apartment in Trump Parc since 2020. As of 2021, Calamari is a registered Republican and resides in Glen Head, New York.
