= GoTrump.com =

Former travel website

- Website type: Travel website
- Available in: English
- Owners: The Trump Organization (Donald Trump)
- Website: www.gotrump.com (Archived from February 2006)
- Commercial: Yes
- Registration: Required to book travel
- Launched: January 24, 2006; 20 years ago in Trump Tower, New York City, New York, United States
- Current status: Ceased operations in 2007; 19 years ago

GoTrump.com was a travel website that was launched by Donald Trump in 2006. The company later closed in 2007. The site's tagline was "The art of the travel deal", a reference to Trump's autobiography, The Art of the Deal.

== History ==
Donald Trump announced the creation of GoTrump.com at Trump Tower in New York City on January 24, 2006. Trump stated at the press conference, "I will find you the great travel deals, whether you are looking to book a luxury getaway or just want the best rate on airlines and hotels worldwide. We are already working with an esteemed group of partners including Travelocity, American Airlines, American Express, Blue Star Jets and Joonbug."

The site featured 60,000 hotels, including "Trump's picks", which were marketed as Donald Trump's favorite hotels and resorts. The website was powered by Travelocity, which licenses its searching and booking technology to other websites.

Trump believed that the website would be a "tremendous success." Henry Harteveldt, a travel industry analyst with Forrester Research and the former marketing director for Trump Shuttle, called GoTrump a "vanity site" for Trump and stated that it would not make much money, saying about Trump "I don't think he's expecting much. This won't generate more than a few million in revenue every year." Trump promoted the website on his daily radio program, Trumped!, and expected to have the site featured in the sixth season of The Apprentice. The website closed in 2007.

Starting in March 2016, "GoTrump.com" redirected to DonaldJTrump.com, which was the official website of Trump's presidential campaign.

== Fate ==
At an unknown time between 2016 and 2022, the URL was purchased by The Lincoln Project where the URL redirects to their website home page. As of 2026, the URL redirects to a GoDaddy landing page.
