= Ortiz Gaming =

- Company type: Private
- Industry: Gaming technology
- Founder: Alejandro Ortiz
- Headquarters: Boca Raton, Florida, United States
- Products: Slot machines, online gambling, mobile gambling, gaming software/hardware development
- Website: ortizgaming.com

Ortiz Gaming is a multinational company specializing in Class II and Class III video bingo slot machines.

The company started in the United States in late 2012, but has been in the European, Latin American, and Asian gambling industry for over 20 years. The company's main offices are in Boca Raton, Florida, with other offices around the U.S.

== Products, technology, business ==
Ortiz Gaming is a video bingo slot machine manufacturer. In the U.S., they build Class II and Class III slot machines in accordance with the Indian Gaming Regulatory Act. Video bingo is a reference to the type of games Ortiz Gaming makes, which are often called bingo-themed games.

Ortiz Gaming calls its slot floor revenue business model the Ortiz Standard, which refers to its games' math model structure. In July 2020, Ortiz and MeridianBet signed an exclusive partnership in which Ortiz would become the primary provider of Video Bingo on the MeridianBet website.

In 2022, Ortiz Gaming partnered with online casino NetBet, which added Ortiz Gaming titles to the online casino’s portfolio of games. In that same year, the company also established a partnership with SkillOnNet in an effort to "expand its LatAm presence."

== Executive management ==
- Alejandro Ortiz – Chairman and Founder
- Rafael Soto – CEO

== See also ==
- List of Florida companies
- List of video game developers
