= The Trump Organization =

Businesses owned by Donald Trump

The Trump Organization, Inc.

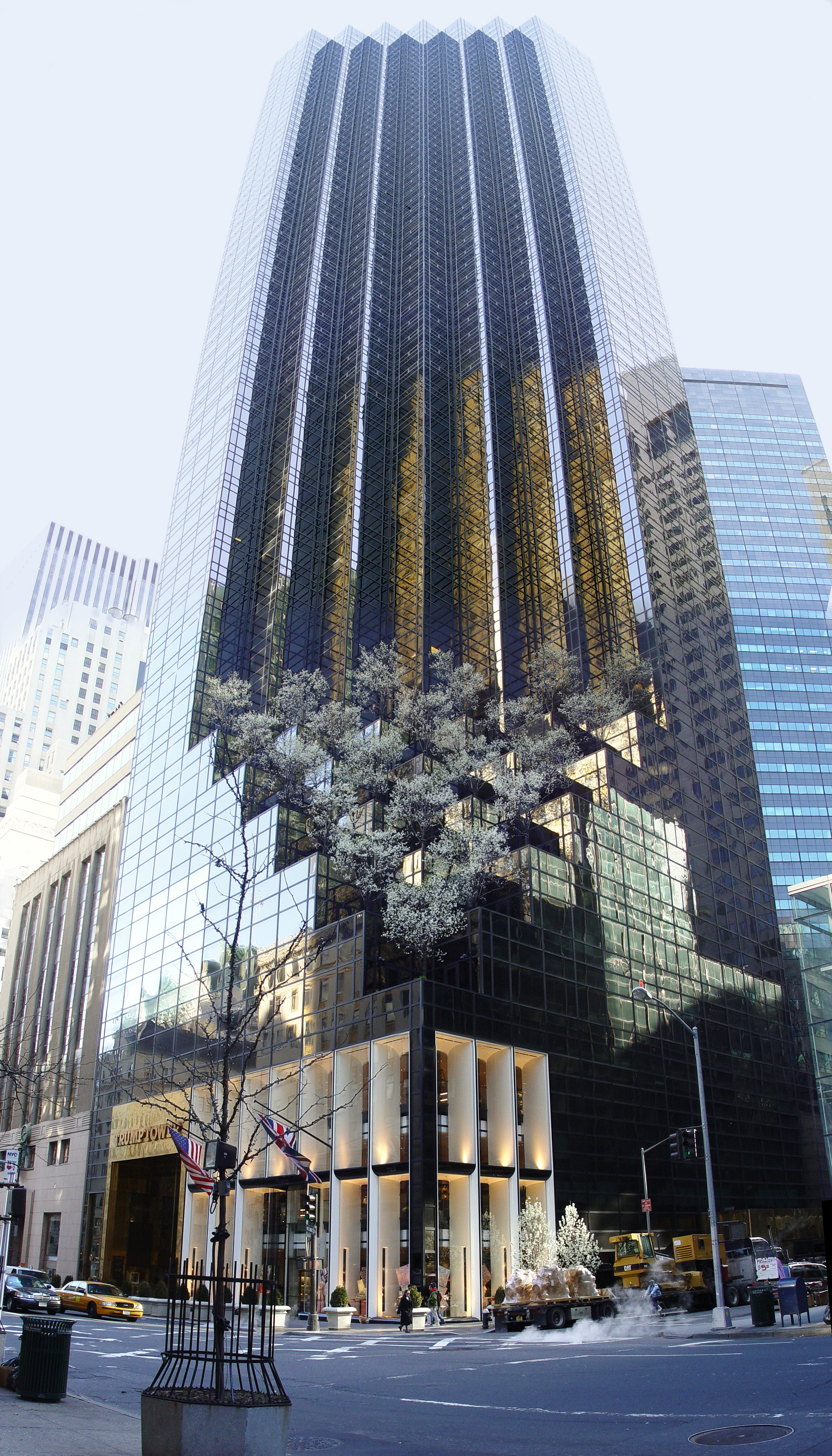
- Trump Tower, headquarters of the Trump Organization
- Type: Private
- Industry: Conglomerate
- Founded: 1927; 99 years ago (as E. Trump & Son)
- Founders: Elizabeth Christ Trump; Fred Trump
- Headquarters: Trump Tower, New York City
- Area served: Worldwide
- Key people: Eric Trump (EVP); Donald Trump Jr. (EVP); Matthew Calamari (COO)
- Services: Construction; Real estate development; Entertainment; Hospitality; Retail; Online shopping; Investments; Telecommunications
- Revenue: US$600 million (estimate, 2024)
- Owner: Donald Trump
- Number of employees: 22,450 (2015)
- Subsidiaries: Eric Trump Wine Manufacturing; Trump Golf Management; Trump International Hotels Management; Trump International Realty
- Website: trump.com

The Trump Organization, Inc. is an American conglomerate. Privately owned by Donald Trump, it consists of most of Trump's business ventures and investments, with around 250 of its affiliates and subsidiaries using the Trump name. Donald Trump joined the organization in 1968, began leading it in 1971, renamed it around 1974, and handed off its leadership to his children in 2017 after he won the 2016 United States presidential election.

The Trump Organization, through its various constituent companies and partnerships, has or has had interests in real estate development, investing, brokerage, sales and marketing, and property management. Trump Organization entities own, operate, invest in, and develop hotels, residential real estate, resorts, residential towers, and golf courses in various countries.

They also operate or have operated in construction, hospitality, casinos, entertainment, book and magazine publishing, broadcast media, model management, retail, financial services, food and beverages, business education, online travel, commercial and private aviation, and beauty pageants. Trump Organization entities also own the New York television production company that produced the reality television franchise The Apprentice. Retail operations include or have included fashion apparel, jewelry and accessories, books, home furnishings, lighting products, bath textiles and accessories, bedding, home fragrance products, small leather goods, vodka, wine, barware, steaks, chocolate bars, and bottled spring water.

Because the Trump Organization's financial statements and Donald Trump's personal tax returns are private, the company's overall valuation is not publicly known, and published estimates have varied widely. Trump has released limited documentation supporting his public valuation claims. On several occasions, Trump has been accused of deliberately inflating the valuation of Trump Organization properties through aggressive lobbying of the media (in particular the authors of the annual Forbes 400 list) to bolster his perceived net worth.

By 2019, the Trump Organization was being scrutinized by New York investigators for possible financial fraud. In July 2021, New York prosecutors charged the organization with 10 counts in an alleged 15-year tax avoidance scheme. In November, The Washington Post reported that between 2011 and 2015 the organization presented several properties as being worth far more to potential lenders than to tax officials. In August 2022, the organization's chief financial officer, Allen Weisselberg, pleaded guilty to committing more than a dozen felonies, including criminal tax fraud and grand larceny.

In September 2022, New York attorney general Letitia James announced a civil lawsuit against the organization. A separate criminal case by the Manhattan district attorney was brought to trial in October; on December 6, the organization was convicted on 17 criminal charges.

In September 2023, the judge presiding over the civil suit ruled that Trump, his adult sons and the organization repeatedly committed fraud and ordered their New York business certificates canceled and their business entities sent into receivership for dissolution in what has been described by observers as a "corporate death penalty". Trump and the organization were ordered to pay nearly $355 million before interest in February 2024, with further restrictions placed on the Trump Organization's business certificates, and on both Trump and his adult sons' ability to do business in New York.

On March 25, 2024, the required payment was lowered to $175 million with a 10-day deadline. Trump posted the bond on April 1, 2024, thus ensuring that his assets and properties could not be seized until at least the time his appeals finished.

== History ==
=== Background ===
Donald Trump's grandparents Frederick Trump and Elizabeth Christ Trump were a German immigrant couple who moved to the borough of Queens in 1907. Frederick began developing real estate there. He died during the "Spanish flu" pandemic in 1918, leaving an estate valued at $31,359 (or about $535,381 in 2020). Elizabeth carried on in the real estate business after her husband's death. She had contractors build houses on the empty lots Frederick had owned, sold the houses, and earned income off the mortgages she provided to buyers.

Her middle child, Donald Trump's father Fred Trump, entered the carpentry trade after graduating high school in 1923. Fred would later say he completed his first single-family home in 1924, but other sources date his start as a builder to 1927. In that year, Fred reached the age of majority, and "E. Trump & Son", a name Elizabeth had used in ads since 1921, was formally incorporated. (Note: Some modern sources, including Donald Trump's The Art of the Deal, refer to the company as "Elizabeth Trump & Son". Contemporaneous sources, however, refer to "E. Trump & Son". Elizabeth Trump used the plural "E. Trump & Sons" in classified ads at least as early as 1921, and mixed in the singular "E. Trump & Son" by 1924.)

In 1929, with Fred at the helm, the company began developing pricier houses in nearby Jamaica Estates. In the deepening depression, the company went out of business. In 1933 Fred opened a supermarket, called "Trump Market", then quickly sold it and returned to the real estate business. Around this same time, Fred Trump and a partner acquired the mortgage-servicing subsidiary of Brooklyn's J. Lehrenkrauss & Co., which had gone bankrupt and subsequently been broken up amid charges of fraud. This gave Trump access to the titles of many properties nearing foreclosure, which he bought at low cost and sold for a profit. He quickly became known as one of New York City's most successful young businessmen. In 1935, the company moved to Brooklyn, where, in addition to Queens, Trump was a prolific builder of single-family homes.

During World War II, Trump constructed apartments and temporary housing for military personnel in Virginia and Pennsylvania. In 1944, he shifted his focus back to Brooklyn and began planning to develop large apartment buildings. He opened the 1,344-unit Shore Haven complex in 1949, followed by Beach Haven in 1950 and Trump Village in 1964.

=== Leadership under Donald Trump ===
Donald Trump worked for his father's business while attending the University of Pennsylvania, and in 1968 officially joined the company. In the early 1970s, Fred gave himself the title chairman of the board and named Donald president of the company. Around 1973, Donald began referring to the business as the Trump Organization. (Note: Donald Trump says in The Art of the Deal that he began using the Trump Organization name during conversations with Victor Palmieri which began in 1973. However, the name was used in at least one advertisement as early as 1972.) The business had previously been referred to on occasion as the Fred C. Trump Organization, the Fred Trump Organization, or the Trump Organization, but had not had a single formal name.

==== Civil rights suit ====
In 1973, the U.S. Department of Justice's (DOJ) Civil Rights Division filed a civil rights suit against the Trump Organization charging them for violating the 1968 Fair Housing Act by refusing to rent to Black people. The National Urban League had sent Black and White testers to apply for apartments in Trump-owned complexes. The White testers got the apartments, whereas the Black testers did not. According to court records, four superintendents or rental agents reported that applications sent to the central office for acceptance or rejection were coded by race.

A 1979 Village Voice article quoted a rental agent who said Fred Trump had instructed him not to rent to Black people and to encourage existing Black tenants to leave. In 1975, a consent decree described by the head of DOJ's housing division as "one of the most far-reaching ever negotiated" required Trump to advertise vacancies in minority papers and list vacancies with the Urban League. The Justice Department subsequently stated that continuing "racially discriminatory conduct by Trump agents has occurred with such frequency that it has created a substantial impediment to the full enjoyment of equal opportunity."

==== Manhattan developments and more ====
Donald Trump focused his efforts on major development projects in Manhattan, including the renovation of the Commodore Hotel, in partnership with Hyatt, as the Grand Hyatt New York (opened in 1980); the construction of Trump Tower in partnership with The Equitable (1983); and the development of Trump Plaza (1984). He also opened three casino hotels in Atlantic City, New Jersey: Trump Plaza (1984), Trump Castle (1985), and Trump Taj Mahal (1990).

In 1989, New York State officials ordered the Grand Hyatt New York, a hotel owned at the time by the Trump Organization and the Hyatt Corporation, to pay New York City $2.9 million in rent that had been withheld by the hotel in 1986 due to "unusual" accounting changes approved by Donald Trump. An investigation by New York City auditors noted that the hotel was missing basic financial records and found the hotel was using procedures that violated generally accepted accounting principles.

Amid a real estate slump in 1990, the Trump Organization approached a financial crisis and was believed to be on the brink of collapse, with Donald Trump and his companies owing 72 banks a total of $4 billion, of which Trump personally guaranteed $800 million. Trump hired Stephen Bollenbach as the company's first chief financial officer, while Allen Weisselberg continued to serve under him as controller. Trump spent the following years renegotiating his debts, and gave up some properties, including the Trump Shuttle airline and a stake in the Plaza Hotel in Manhattan. Bollenbach left the company in 1992. In 1995, Trump took another major step towards financial stability, launching a publicly traded company for the Trump casinos, Trump Hotels & Casino Resorts. By 1996, Trump was widely considered to be making a comeback. The casino company did not fare as well, however, and Trump eventually lost his stake in the company to bankruptcy.

In 1997, Fred Trump transferred ownership of the bulk of his portfolio of apartment buildings to his four surviving children (Donald, Robert, Maryanne, and Elizabeth), submitting tax returns claiming the properties were worth $41.4 million. Fred died in 1999. In 2004, the four siblings sold the apartments for $737.9 million to a group led by Rubie Schron, marking the family's exit from ownership of their father's business.

==== Financing ====
During the property boom of the 1980s, Trump acquired numerous properties and by 1990 owed $4 billion to 72 banks. When the market entered a slump in 1990 that placed the organization at risk of collapse, Trump and his lenders acted to restructure his debts, although they disagree on who identified the problem and initiated negotiations. The resulting restructuring required his banks to forgive some of Trump's debt. Trump's casinos later entered bankruptcies in which his bondholders took deep losses. After these incidents, Trump had difficulty borrowing new money from most mainstream financial institutions.

Deutsche Bank, which did not have a significant presence on Wall Street during the 1980s, expanded rapidly in the U.S. during the 1990s. Trump obtained a loan of approximately $425 million from them in 1998. In the process of its rapid expansion, the bank engaged in numerous questionable practices, including manipulating currencies and interest rates, laundering billions of dollars for Russian oligarchs and misleading international bank regulators. The bank was fined $630 million in 2017 for facilitating a $10 billion Russian money laundering scheme. The bank provided Trump with a variety of services including financial instruments designed to shield him from risks and outside scrutiny, and helped connect Trump to wealthy clients (including some from Russia) who were interested in Western real estate. During the 2000s and 2010s, Trump borrowed $2 billion from the bank, owing it about $360 million in 2016.

From 2000 on, the Trump Organization held 50% of TD Trump Deutschland AG, a corporate venture with a German company, planning to build a skyscraper named "Trump Tower Europe" in Frankfurt, Berlin or Stuttgart, but allegedly never paid the full amount of their €2 million share. At least three lawsuits followed and the company was disestablished in 2005.

By mid-2016, it was alleged that the organization, specifically under the leadership of Donald Trump, had a history of not paying for services rendered. Several hundred contractors or workers for the organization have filed lawsuits or liens saying they were not paid for their work, and others say they had to settle for cents on the dollar.

Trump's eldest son, Donald Jr., was quoted as saying at a 2008 New York real estate conference, "In terms of high-end product influx into the US, Russians make up a pretty disproportionate cross-section of a lot of our assets ... We see a lot of money pouring in from Russia." James Dodson, a golf magazine writer, said that during a 2014 golf game, he asked Trump's son Eric how the organization was funding its golf resort acquisitions, to which Trump responded, "Well, we don't rely on American banks. We have all the funding we need out of Russia." Eric Trump later denied making the statement, although some of the company's financing apparently involves Russian money. The organization has many projects in foreign nations, leading some to point to a conflict of interest with foreign nations as a result of Donald Trump's position as the president of the United States.

==== Valuation disputes ====
The financial statements of the Trump Organization's holdings are private, as are Donald Trump's personal tax returns, and there exist a wide range of estimates of the Trump Organization's true value. Donald Trump has been accused on several occasions of deliberately inflating the valuation of Trump Organization properties through the aggressive lobbying of the media, in particular the authors of the annual Forbes 400 list, in order to bolster his perceived net worth among the public over several decades. He has released little definitive financial documentation to the public to confirm his valuation claims.

It is difficult to determine a net value for the Trump Organization's real estate holdings independently since each individual property may be encumbered by debt.

In October 2015, Forbes published an article detailing its decades-long struggle to estimate the true net worth of Trump and the Trump Organization. In 2018, a former Forbes journalist who had worked on the Forbes list claimed in an op-ed to The Washington Post that Trump had lied about his wealth to Forbes to get on the list repeatedly and suggested that Forbes's previous low-end estimates of Trump's net worth were still well above his true net worth.

In November 2021, The Washington Post reported that between 2011 and 2015, the Trump Organization presented several properties as being worth millions of dollars – in one case over $500 million – more to potential lenders than to tax officials. This was being scrutinized by New York prosecutors in their investigation of the organization's possible fraud and tax evasion. The next month, The New York Times reported that prosecutors were examining whether the organization provided its outside accountants, Mazars, with cherry-picked information with which to prepare favorable financial statements to present to prospective lenders. In February 2022, Mazars cited the New York investigation in announcing that it would no longer stand by its financial statements created for the Trump Organization from mid-2010 to mid-2020, and that it would no longer work with the organization.

=== Trump first presidency, 2017–2021 ===
On January 11, 2017, before starting his tenure as president of the United States, Trump announced that he and his daughter Ivanka would fully resign and his sons Donald Jr. and Eric would take executive charge of the various businesses, along with Chief Finance Officer Allen Weisselberg. Trump transferred his companies into a revocable trust, allowing him to tell the trustees how to run the company and fire them at any time.

Trump retained his financial stake in the business, despite having offered during the campaign to put all his assets in a blind trust should he win the presidency. His attorney at the time, Sheri Dillon, said Trump's assets would be overseen by an ethics officer, and that the Trump Organization would not pursue any new foreign business deals. Under the pre-inaugural management agreement, Forbes magazine reported in March 2017:

The Trump Organization has curtailed some of its international work, pulling out of deals in Azerbaijan, Georgia and Brazil, while pledging to do no new foreign deals (though it has apparently resurrected an old deal in the Dominican Republic). Trump's international hotel licensing and management business makes up only $220 million of his estimated $3.5 billion fortune, but it's the most dynamic part of the Trump portfolio – and it throws off chunks of cash with virtually no risk. As the Trumps have wound down some international deals, they continue to push forward with new domestic agreements.

Eric Trump, in the Forbes article, discussed the "clear separation of church and state that we maintain" between the business and his father and said that with his father's presidency and related changes "[y]ou could look at it either way" in terms of business prospects. He also said that "he will continue to update his father on the business while he is in the presidency ... 'probably quarterly ... profitability reports and stuff like that'." The article quoted Larry Noble, general counsel of the nonpartisan Campaign Legal Center and a former chief ethics officer at the Federal Election Commission, and President George W. Bush's former chief ethics lawyer, Richard Painter, as looking negatively at such multiple planned updates of Trump's businesses per year. Noble said in part "if he is now going to get reports from his son about the businesses, then he really isn't separate in any real way." Painter said in part "at the end of the day, he owns the business. He has the conflicts that come with it."

Also in March 2017, Forbes did a listing of all "36 mini-Trumps", as it termed the domestic and international partners – often described as "billionaires" – with whom the Trump Organization has worked over the years. Introducing the listing, the magazine reported that at least 14 of the partners attended Trump's inauguration and some of them paid for $18,000-a-night accommodations at the Trump International Hotel in Washington, D.C., for the event.

In April 2020, amid the COVID-19 pandemic in the United States, Eric Trump stated that the Trump Organization had requested rental relief from the landlord for its Trump International Hotel, which is the General Services Administration of the federal government.

In September 2020, it was revealed that Trump's properties had charged the government over $1.1 million since the beginning of his presidency. At the Bedminster club, for example, the Secret Service rented a three-bedroom cottage for $17,000 per month. The Washington Post arrived at this total amount after it filed a public-records lawsuit and pieced together receipts and invoices from Trump's businesses.

Political contributions were also spent at Trump properties. The total amount paid by the Trump campaign to Trump properties during his presidency is estimated at $10–17 million.

==== Conflicts of interest ====
The January 2024 report released by the Democratic members of the House Oversight Committee detailing over $7.8 million in payments made by foreign governments to Donald Trump during his presidency.

Conflict of interest concerns were raised soon after Trump became president when China preliminarily approved 38 trademarks in his name for a variety of branded businesses including hotels, restaurants, spas, escort services, and massage parlors. Trump had applied for the trademarks as a candidate in April 2016. In 2018 and 2019, China granted 23 trademarks to Trump-owned companies and to Ivanka Trump while the U.S. administration and China were engaged in trade negotiations.

In January 2024, Democratic members of the U.S. House Committee on Oversight and Accountability released a report detailing over $7.8 million in payments from foreign governments to Trump-owned businesses. After Republicans took control of the House in the 2022 midterm elections, the committee stopped requesting financial records from Trump's accounting firm, Mazars, leading the report to assume that additional payments had occurred.

=== Investigations for fraud and tax evasion ===
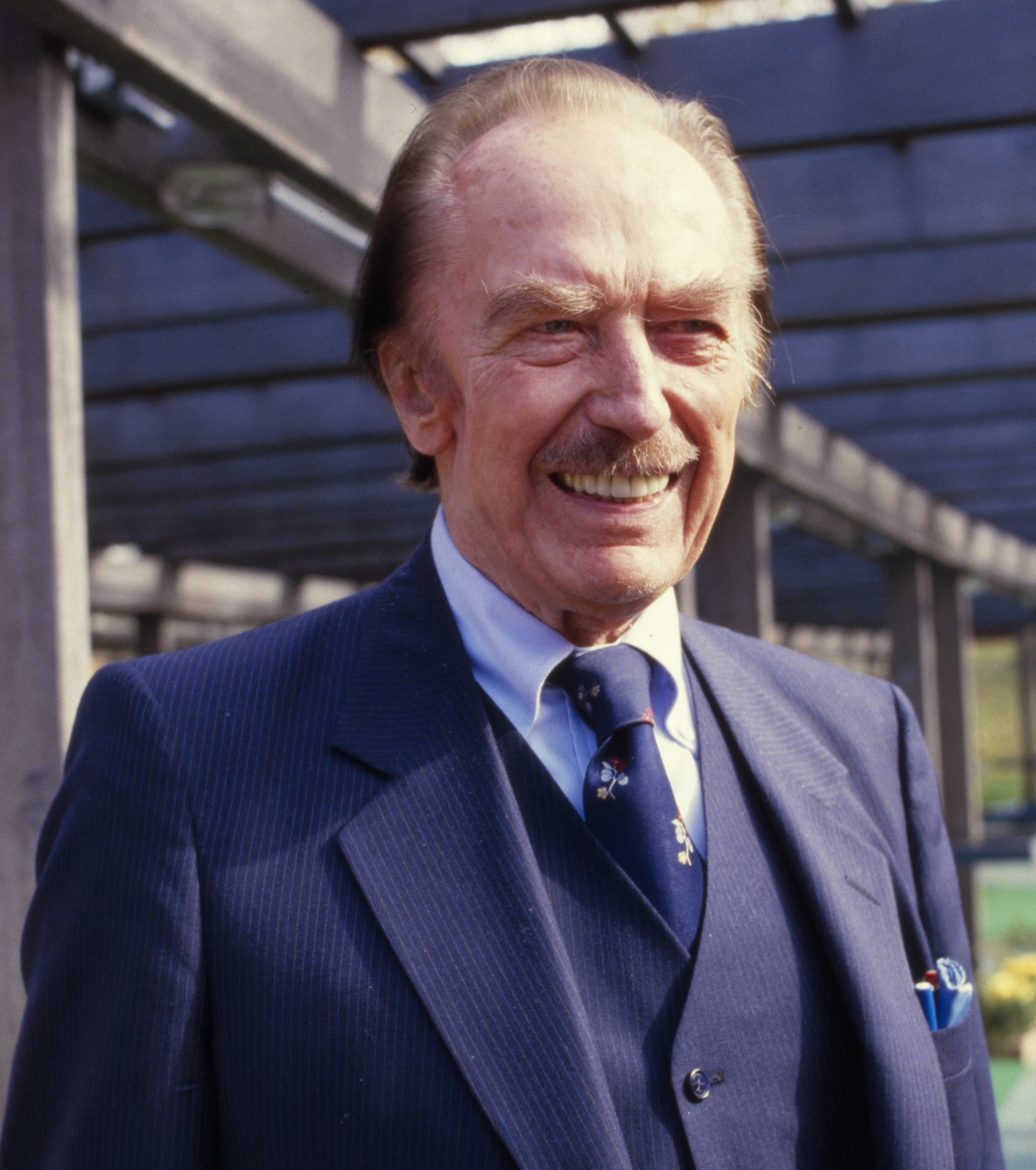
Fred Trump in the 1980s

In August 2018, the Manhattan district attorney (DA) was reported to be considering criminal charges against the organization and two of its senior executives for their accounting of then-Trump personal attorney Michael Cohen's hush money payment to Stormy Daniels.

In October 2018, The New York Times published a lengthy exposé concerning Donald Trump's inheritance from his parents, Fred and Mary Anne MacLeod Trump. It includes detailed analyses of Trump family financial records. (Note: This drew from interviews with former Trump advisers and employees and over 100,000 pages of tax returns and financial records from Trump businesses. Donald's niece Mary L. Trump revealed in her 2020 memoir that she provided the Times with 19 boxes of these financial records.) The article describes an alleged tax fraud scheme conducted by Trump and his siblings related to their joint inheritance of their parents's real estate holdings, effectively evading over $500 million in gift and estate taxes. The alleged schemes involved siphoning money from the companies to the children throughout their lives and understating the value of transferred properties. In mid-2021, Mary L. Trump (a primary source for the exposé) elaborated on how the organization used a shell corporation to siphon money, devaluing Fred Trump's "core business" to $30 million at the time of his death.

Michael Cohen testified to Congress in February 2019 that Trump "inflated [the organization's] total assets when it served his purposes, such as trying to be listed amongst the wealthiest people in Forbes, and deflated his assets to reduce his real estate taxes." Following Cohen's testimony, the New York State Department of Financial Services issued a subpoena to Aon, the organization's longtime insurance broker. By September 2019, the organization was under federal investigation by the Southern District of New York regarding inflated insurance claims allegations.

In January 2020, D.C. Attorney General, Karl Racine sued the organization and Trump's inaugural committee on the basis that it had funneled nonprofit funding intended for the inauguration to the Trumps via event accommodations and a private party costing several hundred thousand dollars at the Trump Hotel. Ivanka Trump testified in December 2020 that she had little to no involvement in the event, which Mother Jones reported in June 2021 was false. Donald Jr. similarly made key statements in his February 2021 testimony which Mother Jones reported in April 2021 were false. In November 2021, a D.C. Superior Court judge dismissed a portion of the lawsuit and dropped the organization as a defendant. Later that month, Racine filed a motion requesting for the organization to be reinstated as a defendant. In February 2022, this request was granted. In May, it was reported that the organization and inaugural committee, which both denied wrongdoing, would pay a $750,000 settlement which will benefit two D.C.-based nonprofits.

In August 2020, New York Attorney General (AG) Letitia James disclosed in a court filing that her office was conducting a civil investigation of the organization for the asset inflation allegation, asking a court to compel the organization to provide information it had been withholding. The Manhattan DA, which had been seeking Donald Trump's tax returns, suggested in an August 2020 federal court filing that the organization was under investigation for bank and insurance fraud. Eric Trump was deposed on October 5. He reportedly invoked his Fifth Amendment right against self-incrimination over 500 times.

People v. Trump Corporation
- Court: Supreme Court of the State of New York County of New York
- Full case name: The People of the State of New York v. The Trump Organization, d/b/a The Trump Organization, Trump Payroll Corp., d/b/a The Trump Organization, Allen Weisselberg
- Defendants: Trump Organization, Trump Payroll Organization, and Allen Weisselberg

On May 18, 2021, the New York AG's office announced that it was joining the Manhattan DA's office in probing the organization "in a criminal capacity." The Manhattan DA convened a special grand jury to consider indicting Trump, his company and/or executives. By June 2021, longtime chief financial officer Allen Weisselberg and chief operating officer Matthew Calamari were under scrutiny of the Manhattan DA investigation.

==== Criminal and civil charges ====
On July 1, 2021, the Manhattan district attorney criminally charged the Trump Organization with a "15 year 'scheme to defraud' the government", conspiracy, and falsifying business records. Prosecutors filed 10 charges against the organization and its Trump Payroll Corporation entity, and 15 felony counts against Weisselberg, including grand larceny and offering a false instrument for filing. Prosecutors allege that Weisselberg received about $1.76 million in undeclared indirect compensation in the form of free rent and utilities, car leases for himself and his wife, and school tuition for his grandchildren.

Both the organization and Weisselberg pleaded not guilty. On July 8, the Trump Organization removed Weisselberg as director of the company running Trump International Golf Links, Scotland; on July 9, the company removed him as director of 40 subsidiaries registered in Florida. It was later reported that Weisselberg had invoked his Fifth Amendment right against self-incrimination over 500 times.

The Manhattan DA convened a second grand jury the last week of October 2021; it began to hear evidence on November 4, reportedly to consider charges related to the company's valuation of assets. By November 22, prosecutors were scrutinizing several of the organization's properties for which, between 2011 and 2015, far higher values were presented to potential lenders than were reported to tax officials. In the most extreme case, in 2012, the 40 Wall Street building was cited as being worth $527 million to the former, but only $16.7 million to the latter. Michael Cohen subsequently stated that prosecutors could "indict Donald Trump tomorrow if they really wanted, and be successful". On December 1, the New York AG subpoenaed Trump in the civil case, with plans to depose him on January 7, 2022. Ivanka and Donald Trump Jr. were issued subpoenas in the matter on the same day.

By mid-December 2021, an accountant for Trump had testified before the grand jury. Prosecutors were reportedly examining whether the organization provided its outside accountants, Mazars USA, with cherry-picked information with which to prepare favorable financial statements to present to prospective lenders. Mazars provided disclaimers with its financial statements for the organization, indicating that the firm had not audited, reviewed, or given any assurances about them, and noting that "Donald J. Trump is responsible for the preparation and fair presentation of the financial statement in accordance with accounting principles generally accepted in the United States of America." The Republican National Committee (RNC) agreed to pay up to $1.6 million of Trump's legal expenses for his defense in both the civil and criminal cases, which an RNC spokesperson referred to as "politically motivated legal proceedings".

In December 2021, Trump's lawyer Alina Habba filed a lawsuit against New York AG Letitia James, alleging that the investigation of the former president was "guided solely by political animus and a desire to harass, intimidate, and retaliate against a private citizen who she views as a political opponent" and that his civil rights were being violated. A federal judge dismissed the suit in May 2022.

On January 3, 2022, James and a lawyer for the organization filed a court document noting that Donald Trump and his two eldest children had moved to block their subpoenas on the premise that the AG was attempting to sidestep due process to gather evidence against them in the related criminal case. James argued that the Trumps were using a continued pattern of "delay tactics" to keep her from interviewing them under oath. On January 10, Habba filed a motion seeking a stay of proceedings to allow an injunction against James.

On January 18, James filed a motion to compel Trump and his two oldest children to appear in court, stating that "Thus far in our investigation, we have uncovered significant evidence that suggests Donald J. Trump and the Trump Organization falsely and fraudulently valued multiple assets and misrepresented those values to financial institutions for economic benefit." On February 17, a judge rejected an argument by a Trump attorney that the former president belongs to a protected class and ordered the Trumps to testify; the First Judicial Department of the Supreme Court of New York State upheld this ruling on May 26. From late April to late June, Trump was held in civil contempt for failing to provide subpoenaed documents. Subsequently, real-estate firm Cushman & Wakefield, which conducted appraisals for several Trump Organization properties (before cutting ties by January 2021), was held in contempt for failing to meet a deadline for subpoenaed documents.

After weeks of internal debate within the district attorney's office about the strength of the evidence against Trump, two top prosecutors in the case resigned in February 2022 after new district attorney Alvin Bragg said he was not prepared to authorize an indictment of Trump personally. One of the prosecutors who resigned, Mark Pomerantz, stated in his resignation letter that Trump was "guilty of numerous felony violations" and that he was confident it could be proven in court. Bragg's spokeswoman later said the investigation was continuing. The criminal trial against the Trump Organization began on October 24.

On December 6, 2022, a New York jury convicted the Trump Organization on all 17 of its tax fraud charges. One entity, the Trump Corporation, was convicted of nine criminal charges, while its other entity, the Trump Payroll Corporation, was convicted of eight criminal charges as well.

==== New York civil lawsuit for fraud ====
On September 21, 2022, James announced a civil lawsuit against Trump, his three oldest children, and the organization for fraud and other forms of misrepresentation, citing over 200 alleged instances and asserting that Trump "wildly exaggerated his net worth by billions of dollars". The suit sought $250 million in penalties and future restrictions on Trump family business activities in New York State. In advance of filing the suit, Trump sat for a deposition during which he invoked his Fifth Amendment right against self-incrimination over 440 times. On November 3, the New York judge overseeing the lawsuit approved James's request for an independent monitor to prevent future fraud by the organization, specifically requiring the judge's approval before any assets were sold or transferred. James found that days before her suit was filed, Trump attorneys had created a new Delaware corporation, dubbed Trump Organization II, which she was concerned could be used to protect Trump's assets from a financial judgment.

The judge presiding over the civil suit ruled in September 2023 that Trump, his adult sons, and the Trump Organization had repeatedly committed fraud and ordered their New York business certificates canceled and their business entities sent into receivership for dissolution. In February 2024, the judge ordered Trump to pay a penalty of more than $350 million plus interest, for a total of more than $450 million, and barred him from heading any New York company for three years. Trump said he would appeal the verdict. His sons Donald Jr. and Eric were ordered to pay more $4 million each and barred from serving as officers or directors of any New York firm for two years. The judge also ordered the company to be overseen by the monitor appointed by the court in 2023 and an independent director of compliance, and said that any "restructuring and potential dissolution" would be the decision of the monitor. In March 2024, the New York Appeals would reduce the required payment to $175 million and set a 10-day deadline, with Trump agreeing to make the payment within the deadline. Trump posted the bond within the required deadline.

=== IRS audit ===
In 2024, the New York Times and ProPublica reported that the Internal Revenue Service investigated whether Trump had twice written off losses of his Trump International Hotel and Tower (Chicago) through construction cost overruns, lagging sales, and selling residential units below value. In his 2008 tax return, he declared the property to be worthless. The two publications calculated that – of the total deduction of $697 million Trump claimed that year – up to $651 million were based on the property's worthlessness. In 2010, he passed ownership of the property from one of his business entities to another one and claimed another $168 million for the next 10 years. The publications, "in consultation with tax experts, calculated that the revision sought by the IRS would create a new tax bill of more than $100 million, plus interest and potential penalties".

=== "Corporate death penalty" ===
In September 2023, Arthur Engoron, the judge presiding over the civil suit, ruled that Trump, his adult sons and the organization repeatedly committed fraud and ordered their New York business certificates canceled and their business entities sent into receivership for dissolution in what has been described by observers as a "corporate death penalty".

=== Lawsuit against Capital One bank ===
In 2021, Capital One closed more than 300 Trump Organization bank accounts, saying that "[t]he closures were the result of months of analysis and a careful review by ‌Capital One's AML team in accordance with bank policies and regulatory guidance". In March 2025, the Trump Organization sued the bank in Florida federal court, stating the bank closed the accounts for political reasons. The bank's filing in response said that the accounts' transactions were reviewed by anti-money-laundering experts who found the transaction patterns were "among the types of activity flagged by federal banking guidance".

== Real estate ==
Map highlights countries with properties that are either owned or licensed by the Trump Organization as of December 2016.

As of 2019, Trump's net worth (as estimated by Forbes) was $3.1 billion, with about half of that coming from his New York City real estate holdings, and about a third coming from his national and international properties (including hotels and golf courses). Licensing fees paid by outside owners for using Trump's name on their properties also contribute to his overall net worth.

=== Selected completed properties ===
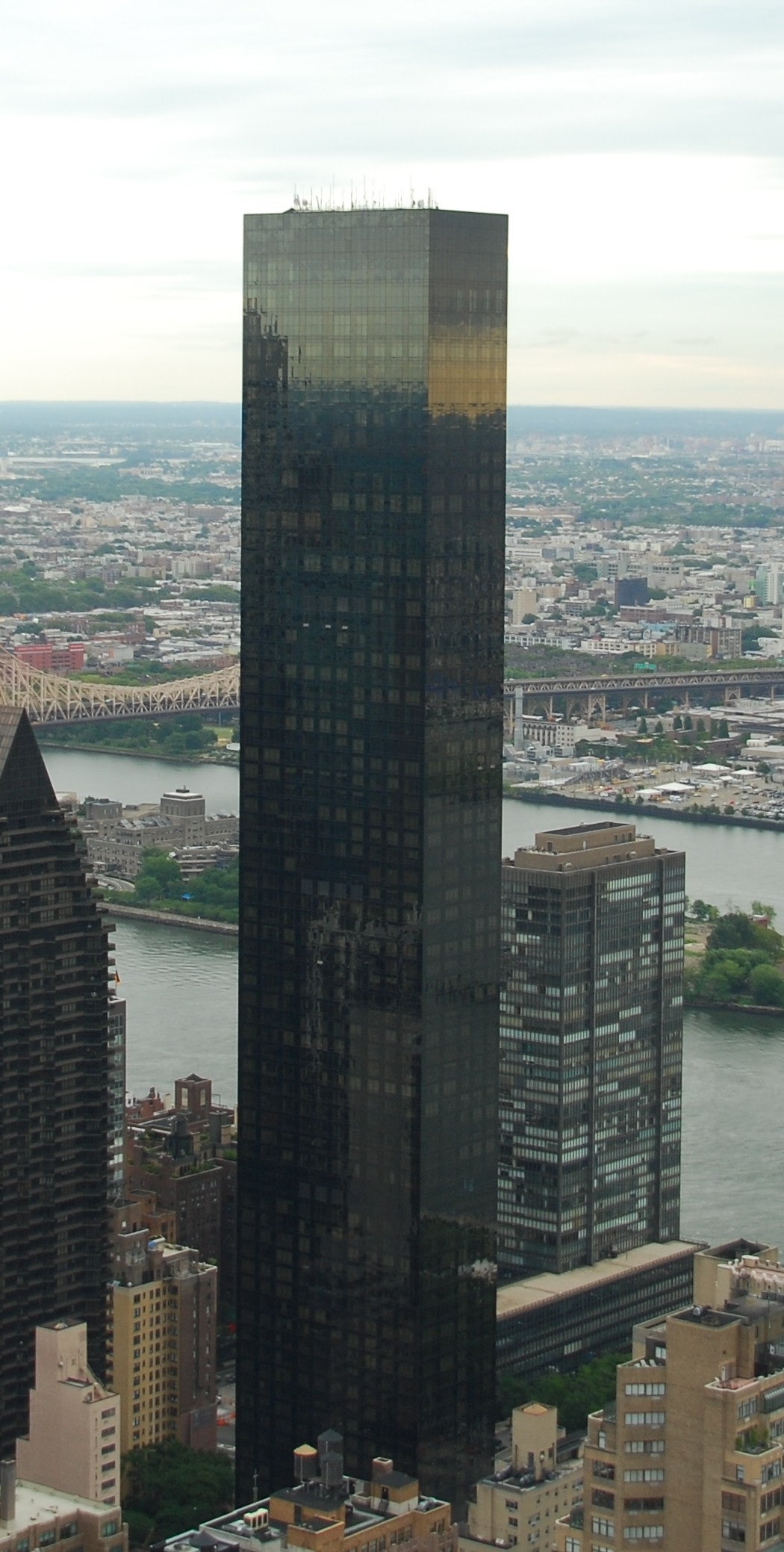
The Trump World Tower at United Nations Plaza

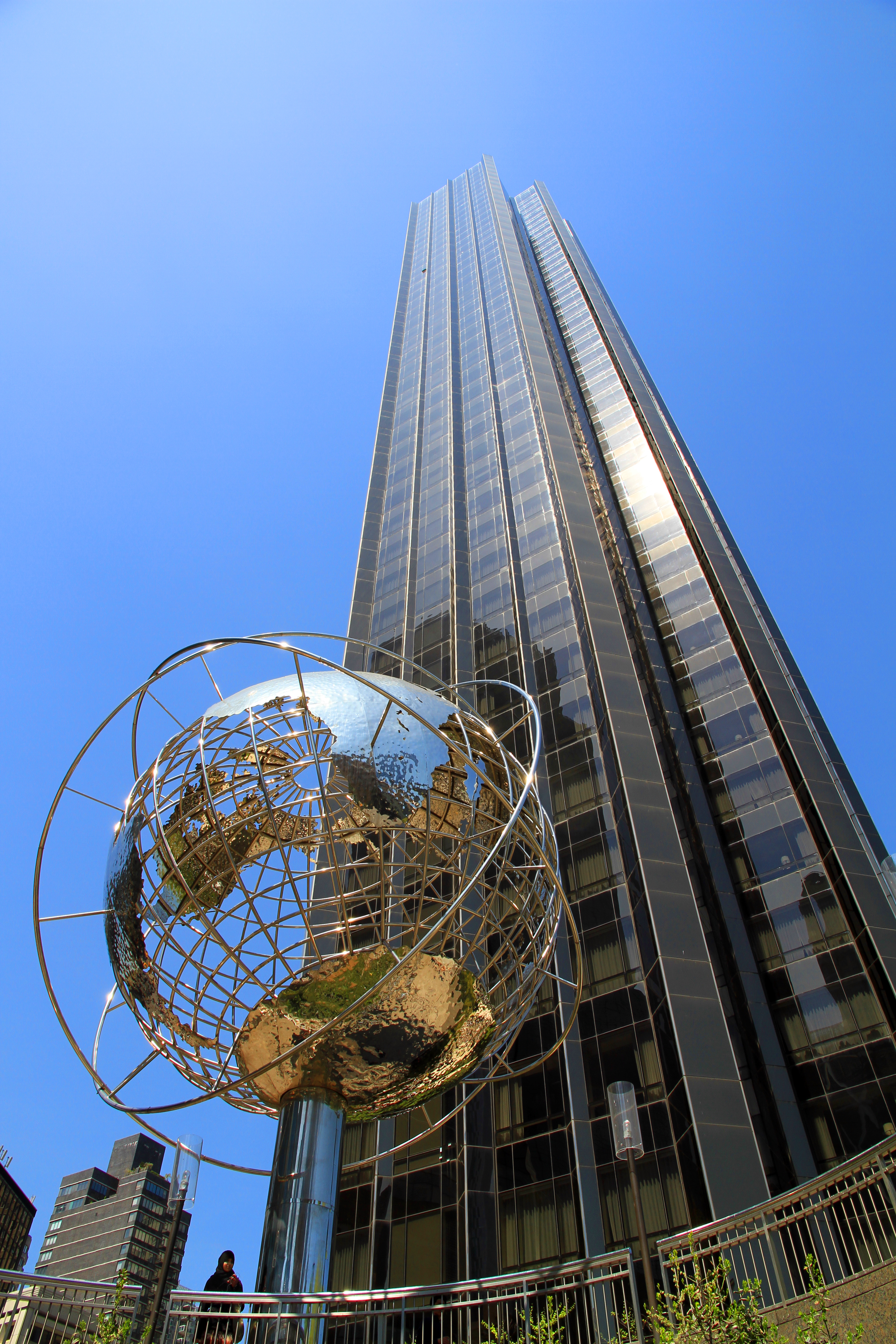
The Trump International Hotel and Tower (New York City) at Columbus Circle

- Trump Tower, 725 Fifth Avenue, Midtown Manhattan: A 58-story mixed-use tower, the headquarters of the Trump Organization, was developed in partnership with The Equitable, and opened in 1983. Trump bought out the Equitable's stake in 1986, and now owns the office and retail components of the tower. The building also contains the three-story penthouse apartment that was Donald Trump's primary residence until he moved to the White House. The value of the tower was estimated at $450 million in 2017. Trump took out a $100 million mortgage on the building in 2012.
- Trump World Tower, 845 United Nations Plaza, also in Midtown Manhattan: In 2006, Forbes magazine estimated "$290 million in profits and unrealized appreciation" going to Trump.
- AXA Financial Center in Manhattan and 555 California Street in San Francisco: Trump owns a 30 percent stake in these two office buildings, resulting from a property swap involving Riverside South. Trump's stake in the two buildings was estimated to be at least $850 million as of 2013.
- The Trump Building at 40 Wall Street: Trump bought this building's leasehold in 1995 and renovated the structure for $1 million. The pre-tax net operating income at the building as of 2011 was $20.89 million and is valued between $350 million and $400 million, according to the New York Department of Finance. Trump took out a $160 million mortgage attached to the property with an interest rate of 5.71% to use for other investments. Forbes valued the property at $260 million in 2006.
- Trump International Hotel and Tower Chicago: The entire project is valued at $1.2 billion ($112 million stake for Trump).
- Trump International Hotel Las Vegas: A joint development with fellow Forbes 400 members, Phil Ruffin ("key partner"), and Jack Wishna ("minority partner"). In 2006, Trump's stake was estimated at $162 million. In Forbes in March 2017, the Trump International Las Vegas was described as a 50-50 partnership between Donald Sr. and Ruffin, with Eric as the primary manager for the Trump Organization.
- Trump International Hotel and Tower New York: Trump provided his name and expertise to the building's owner (GE) during the building's re-development in 1994 for a fee totaling $40 million ($25 million for project management and $15 million in incentives deriving from the condo sales). Forbes values Trump's stake at $12 million. In March 2010, the penthouse apartment at Trump International Hotel & Tower in New York City sold for $33 million.
- Trump Park Avenue, Park Avenue and 59th Street: It is valued at $142 million. Trump owns 23 apartments at Trump Park Avenue, which he rents for rates as high as $100,000 per month, and 19 units at Trump Parc.
- 6 East 57th Street: Trump has a leasehold interest on this retail building, adjacent to Trump Tower, through the year 2079. The building was occupied by a Niketown store from 1996 to 2018. The value of Trump's interest was estimated at $470 million as of 2015.
- Mar-a-Lago: A historic estate in Palm Beach, Florida, most of which was converted by Trump into a members-only resort. The property was worth as much as $250 million as of 2013. Trump also owns two neighboring private houses, valued at $6.5 million and $3 million.
- Seven Springs: A 213-acre (86 ha) estate with a 13-bedroom mansion near Bedford, New York. Trump paid $7.5 million for the property in 1995. Local brokers put the property's value at around $40 million as of 2013. Trump had hoped to develop the land with a golf course or houses, but apparently abandoned those plans in 2015.
- Beverly Hills house: A 5-bedroom home purchased by Trump in 2007 for $7 million, and valued between $8.5 and $10 million as of 2013. Sold the property in June 2019, off-market, for $13.5 million.

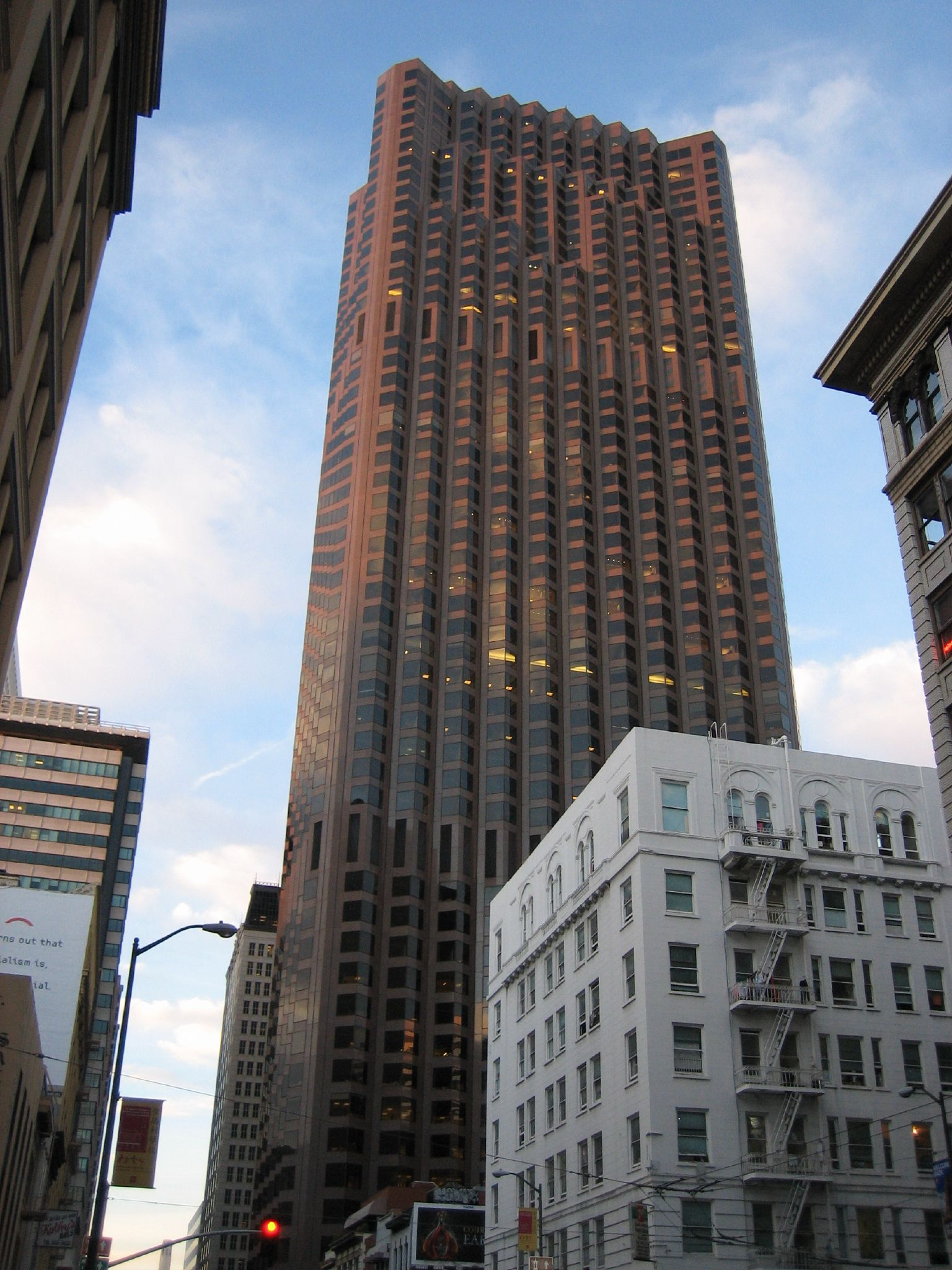
Bank of America Tower, 2nd tallest building in San Francisco

=== Skating rinks ===
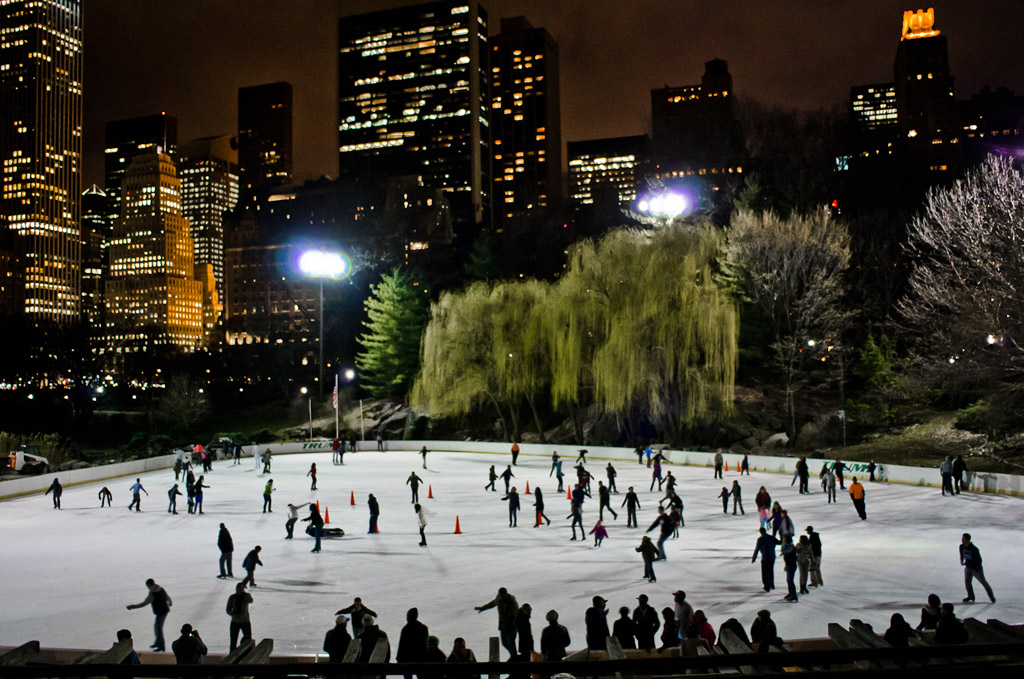
Wollman Rink, Central Park

In 1986, Trump rebuilt the deteriorating Wollman Rink two months ahead of schedule and $750,000 under the $2.5 million price ceiling imposed by the city. Trump asked his contractors, among them HRH Construction, to do the work without making a profit, promising them publicity but not mentioning their contributions to the press afterwards. Trump was given a concession to operate the rink for a year, with the profits to be given to charity. In 1987, as part of the agreement to keep operating Wollman Rink, the Trump Organization agreed to also take a concession for the Lasker Rink; they held the concessions until 1995.

In 2001, a Trump-owned subsidiary, Wollman Rink Operations LLC, won another concession to operate the rinks until April 30, 2021. Wollman Rink Operations LLC is owned by DJT Holdings LLC which was owned by the Donald J. Trump Revocable Trust for the duration of Trump's presidency. The Trump name was prominently displayed on the walls of the Wollman Rink and on the Zamboni maintaining the ice. In 2019, the Trump Organization replaced the name with Wollman Rink logos. In his financial disclosure filed in May 2018, Trump reported nearly $35 million in income from the two rinks since 2015.

The Trump Organization's contract to operate the rinks expired in April 2021.

=== Trump Winery ===
Trump Winery is a winery situated on Trump Vineyard Estates near Charlottesville, Virginia. It is valued between $5 million and $25 million.

The vineyard was purchased by Trump in April 2011 from Patricia Kluge, the widow of John Kluge. The property was distressed. and was officially opened in October 2011. Trump Winery is situated in the Monticello Wine Trail. Trump's son Eric was a partner in the purchase.

After purchasing the property, Trump turned over management of the winery to his son.

=== Golf courses ===
The Trump Organization owns or manages sixteen golf courses in the United States, Scotland, Ireland, and the United Arab Emirates. As of 2015, Trump listed income of at least $176 million in an 18-month span from his golf courses – about 41% of the low-end estimate of his income.

==== United States ====
Trump National Golf Club, Colts Neck

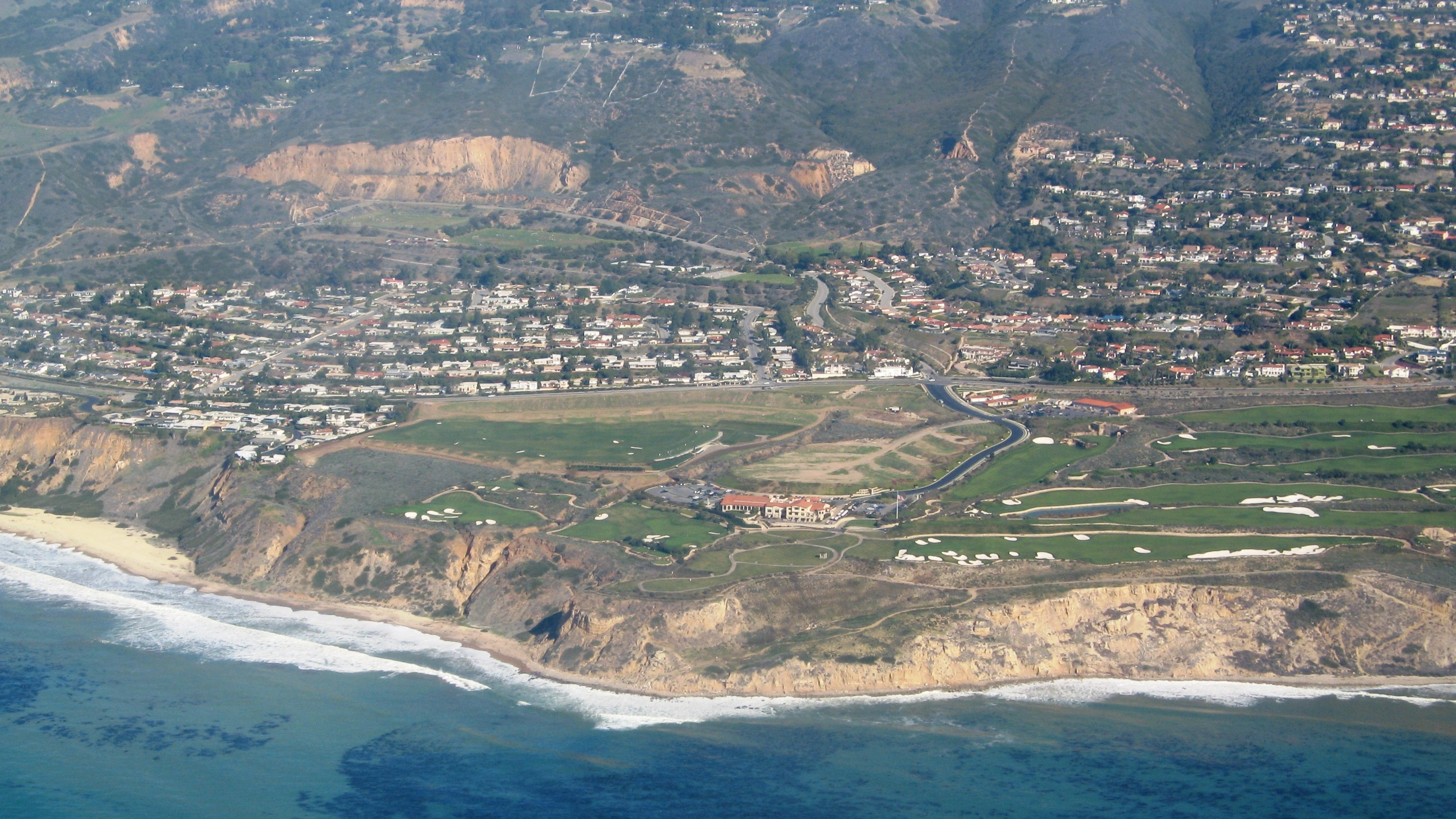
Trump National Golf Club, Los Angeles

- Trump International Golf Club, West Palm Beach, Florida
- Trump National Doral Miami: An 800-acre (320 ha) resort with five golf courses, 700 hotel rooms, a spa, meeting spaces, and retail outlets. Trump bought the property out of bankruptcy in 2012 for $150 million, and has spent over $250 million on renovations. Its value has been estimated at over $1 billion, and there was a $125 million mortgage on the property as of 2013.
- Trump National Golf Club, Bedminster, New Jersey
- Trump National Golf Club, Charlotte, North Carolina
- Trump National Golf Club, Colts Neck, New Jersey
- Trump National Golf Club, Hudson Valley, New York
- Trump National Golf Club, Jupiter, Florida
- Trump National Golf Club, Los Angeles
- Trump National Golf Club, Philadelphia
- Trump National Golf Club Washington, D.C., Potomac Falls, Virginia
- Trump National Golf Club, Westchester, New York

==== International ====
- Trump International Golf Club, Dubai: A golf course owned by Damac Properties and managed by the Trump Organization. Located in the Damac Hills residential development, it opened in 2017. Trump's involvement with Damac head Hussain Sajwani has been cited as a source of possible conflicts of interest for Trump's presidency.
- Trump International Golf Links and Hotel Ireland
- Trump International Golf Links, Scotland: A links course built in Balmedie, Aberdeenshire. The development of the course was controversial because of local concerns about the environmental impact, as well as a legal battle over the construction of a nearby offshore wind farm.
- Trump Turnberry: A historic golf resort with three courses and a hotel, located in South Ayrshire, Scotland. Trump purchased the property in 2014, despite having threatened to withdraw any further investment in Scotland amid the wind farm controversy.
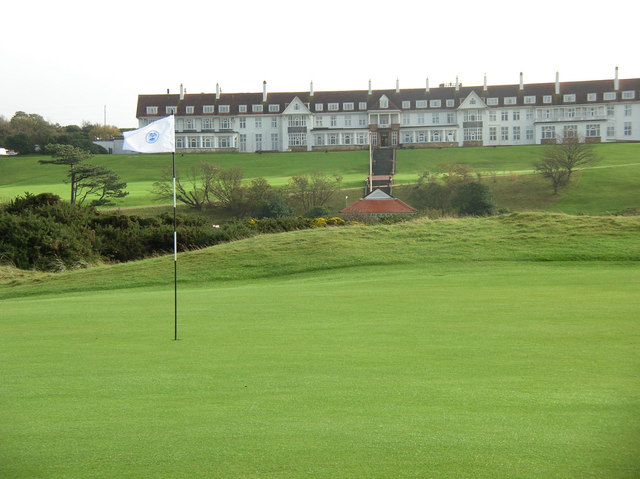
  Trump Turnberry golf course, Scotland
- Trump World Golf Club, Dubai: A second golf course under construction by Damac in its Akoya Oxygen housing development. In February 2021, it was announced that the opening of the golf course was delayed until at least 2022. It was being asserted that the delay was due to the COVID-19 pandemic, but the Emirati developers were struggling to finish the real estate projects even before the pandemic.

=== Real estate licensing ===
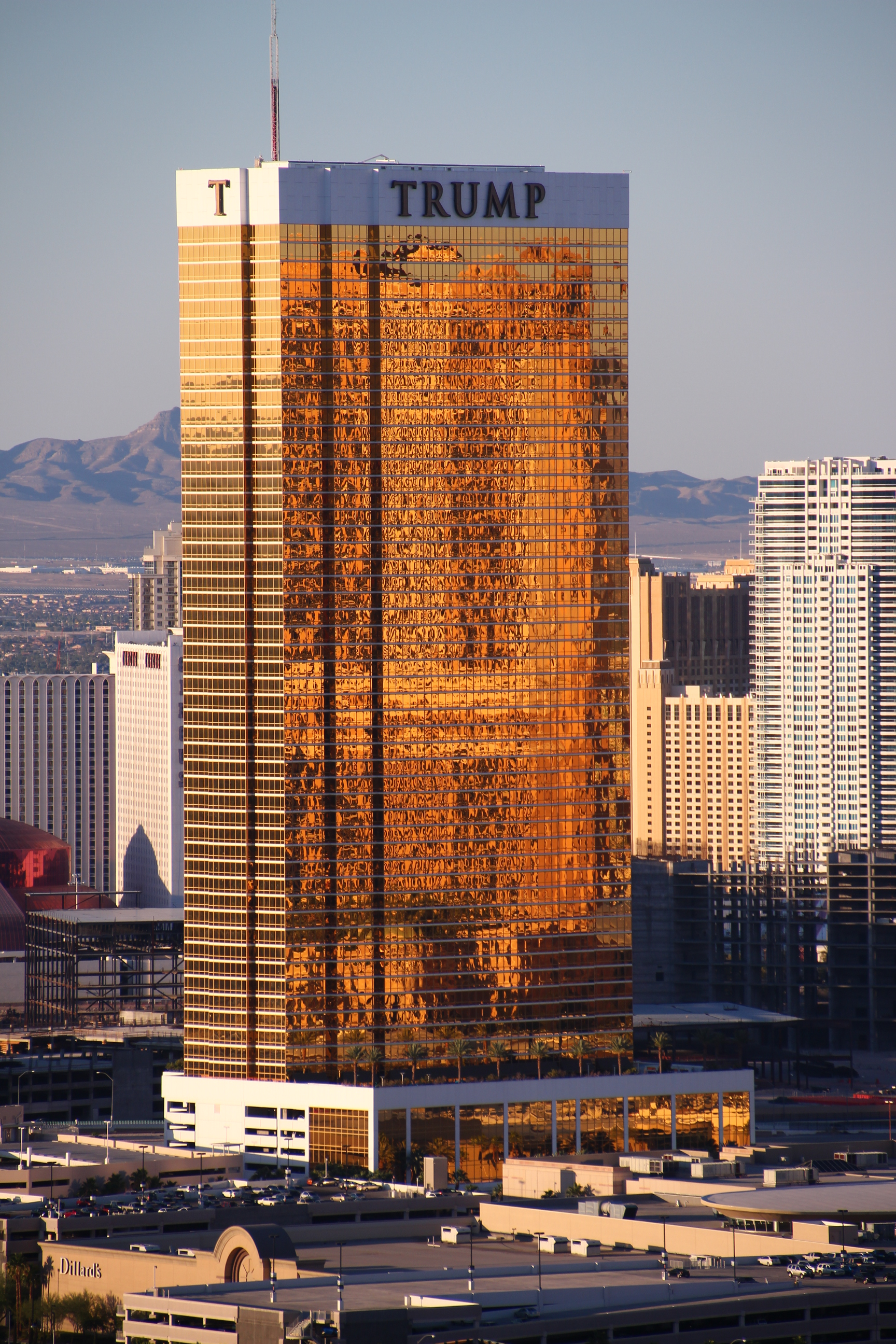
Trump International Hotel, Las Vegas

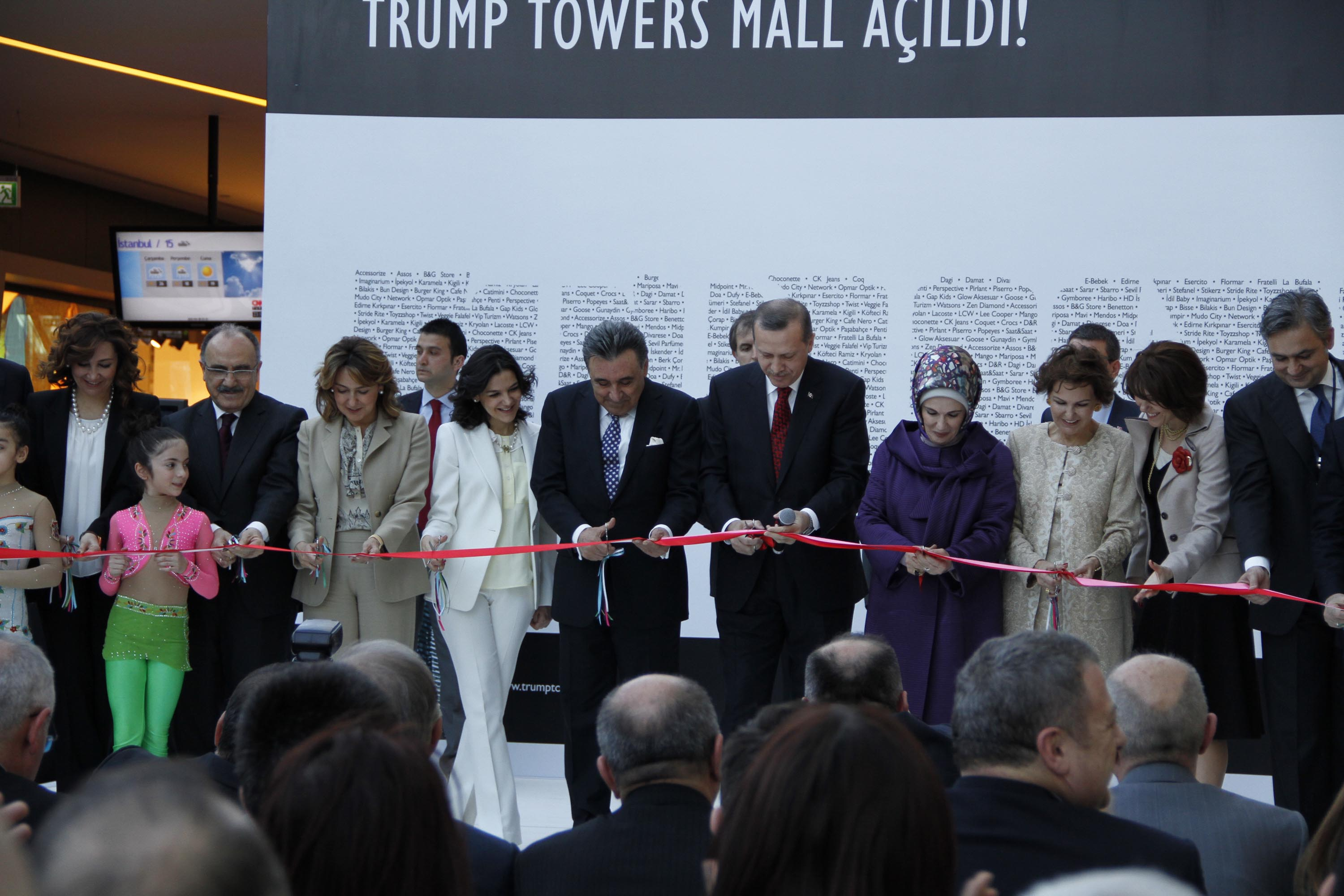
Turkish Prime Minister Erdoğan attended the opening of the Trump Towers Istanbul AVM in 2012.

Many developers pay Donald Trump to market their properties and be the public face for their projects. For that reason, Trump does not own many of the buildings that display his name. According to Forbes, this portion of Trump's empire, actually run by his children, has a valuation of $562 million. According to Forbes, there were 33 licensing projects under development including seven "condo hotels" (the seven Trump International Hotel and Tower developments). As of 2013, Trump had generated more than $74 million in real estate licensing deals and had $823.3 million worth of real estate in joint ventures.

- Manhattan:
  - Trump Palace: 200 East 69th Street, New York, NY.
  - Trump Parc and Trump Parc East: Two adjoining buildings on Central Park South on the southwest corner of The Avenue of the Americas. Trump Parc East is a 14-story apartment building and Trump Parc (the former Barbizon Plaza Hotel) is a 38-story condominium building.
  - Trump Plaza: 167 East 61st Street, New York, NY (36-story, Y-shaped plan condominium building on the Upper East Side)
  - 610 Park Avenue (Old Mayfair Hotel): Trump is helping with the construction and development of this property for Colony NorthStar.
  - Trump SoHo: Former name of The Dominick, originally a partnership with Bayrock Group. The SoHo hotel was rebranded following the Trump Organization's exit from the project. "Russian-born" Felix Sater was listed as an employee of Bayrock when the partnership was born. Sater had served time in prison for injuries he inflicted in a bar fight before the Soho partnership.
- New York City suburbs:
  - Trump Bay Street: A 447-unit rental apartment building in Jersey City with the real estate development company, Kushner Properties and The KABR Group.
  - Trump Plaza: An apartment tower located adjacent to Trump Bay Street.
  - Trump Plaza: A 39-story luxury residence and hotel with retail space in Westchester County, NY with developer Louis R. Cappelli.
  - Trump Tower at City Center: A 35-story condominium apartment building built in Westchester County, New York with developer Louis R. Cappelli.
  - Trump Parc Stamford: A development in Stamford, Connecticut, with F. D. Rich Company and Louis R. Cappelli.
  - Trump Park Residences: A development in Shrub Oak, NY with Louis Cappelli.
- Florida:
  - Trump International Hotel and Tower Fort Lauderdale: Anticipated completion was 2007. Trump "decided to pull his name from the marquee and end his agreement with the developers" in 2009 and the developers defaulted on a $139 million loan in 2010, leaving the building faced with foreclosure. In November 2010, Trump announced he was no longer affiliated with the project.
  - Trump Towers Sunny Isles Beach (Sunny Isles Beach, Florida): An oceanfront condominium development consisting of three 271-unit towers with developer Dezer Properties.
  - Trump Grande Ocean Resort and Residences: A three-building oceanfront enclave consisting of the Trump International Beach Resort and two residential condominium towers, the Trump Palace and Trump Royale, with developer Dezer Properties.
  - Trump Hollywood, a 200-unit, 41-story condominium tower in Hollywood, Florida, developed by Jorge M. Pérez and The Related Companies. Announced in 2006 and began construction a year later. Opened in 2009 and foreclosed the following year, before selling out in 2012.
  - Trump Tower: Cancelled project in Tampa, Florida.
- Other domestic:
  - Trump Towers Atlanta: project foreclosed and cancelled.
  - Trump Tower: empty lot in Philadelphia, filed for bankruptcy as of January 2013 to prevent imminent foreclosure.
  - Trump International Hotel and Tower Waikiki Beach Walk: Completed in November 2009 with 462 hotel-condominium units.
  - Trump International Hotel & Residence: was a proposed real estate development in Phoenix, Arizona, that was cancelled on December 21, 2005.
  - Trump International Hotel and Tower: New Orleans (Project slated to begin construction during the first quarter of 2007). "Declared dead in July 2011 after the location land was foreclosed on and sold at auction".
  - Trump International Hotel and Tower Chicago: Completed in early 2009 (Opened to public January 30, 2009). Cost of construction was about $847 million.
- International:
  - Elite Tower, Ramat Gan, Israel was a planned commercial real estate development slated to be the tallest building in Israel. Called the Trump Plaza Tower, Trump shelved the plans in 2007, when the site was sold on to Azorim for NIS 306.5 million. Trump purchased the site for $44 million.
  - Trump International Hotel & Tower Lido Lake, West Java, Indonesia. Trump Hotels will be involved with the 700-hectare Lido Lake development, one hour from Bandung, Indonesia including a six-star luxury resort, 18-hole signature Ernie Els championship golf course, elite Lifestyle Country Club & Spa as well as a high-end residential offering including luxury villas and condominiums. One of the Trump Organization's partners in Indonesia is Tanoesoedibjo, who is "building up a following as he mulls a presidential run", according to Forbes. MNC Lido City is partially funded by the Chinese government.
  - Trump International Hotel & Tower Vancouver, Vancouver. The 63-story, 188-metre-high (617-foot), mixed-use tower in Downtown Vancouver, British Columbia, Canada, was primarily a project of Donald Trump Jr. and the CEO of Malaysian company TA Global Berhad. It was completed in 2016. The Trump hotel occupies the first 15 floors of the building. The hotel had reported declining revenue in 2019 and closed in March 2020. Its owner, a subsidiary of TA Global Berhad, filed for bankruptcy in August 2020.
  - Trump Towers Istanbul, Istanbul, Turkey

- Trump World Seoul, Korea: Which Trump received a licensing fee of $5 million to lend his name.
- Daewoo Trump World Centum, Busan, Korea
- The Palm Trump International Hotel and Tower, Dubai
- Trump Ocean Resort Baja Mexico was a planned 3-tower, 25-story, 526 unit hotel condominium, San Diego. This project collapsed due to the project's failure to secure financing.
- Trump at Cap Cana will be located in Punta Cana, Dominican Republic.
- Trump Tower Manila, Makati City, Metro Manila, Philippines: The brand name and mark under license. Anticipated completion is to be announced. Philippines president Rodrigo Duterte "appointed Trump partner Jose Antonio to serve as a special envoy to the United States just before Trump's November victory".
- Trump Tower, Mumbai, India. "Billionaire Mangal Lodha is developing a 75-story, 300-apartment luxury residential project called Trump Towers building while serving as a regional vice president of a major political party."
- Trump Towers Pune, India, built in association with Panchshil Realty in Pune's Kalyani Nagar area.
- Trump Towers, Gurugram, India, is the largest super-luxury residential development in India with 1.25 million-square-foot project near Golf Course Extension Road, which will be built by IREO alongside a retail complex.
- Trump Towers, Gurugram, India is the second project in Gurgaon tied up with developer M3M India to build a residential building in Gurgaon.
- Trump Towers Kolkata, India, is the result of tie up with Unimark Group and Trump Organization to build a 38 floor 400,000 sq. ft. residential project near Eastern Metropolitan Bypass stretch, Kolkata.
- As of February 2017 in South America, the Trump Organization had one active project: the Trump Tower Punta del Este in Punta del Este, Uruguay. By that time, the company had ended its involvement with two projects in Rio de Janeiro, Brazil: the partially built Trump Hotel Rio de Janeiro and the unbuilt Trump Towers Rio office complex. The company also dropped plans for another office project, the 35-story Trump Office Buenos Aires, which was to be built in Buenos Aires, Argentina. Paulo Figueiredo Filho partnered with the organization in Brazil and "worked mostly with the [Trump] children".

==== Trump International Hotels Management LLC ====
The company, which did business as the Trump Hotel Collection (THC) until it was renamed Trump Hotels, manages Trump properties and Trump-branded hotels, residential buildings, and golf courses worldwide.

In 2008, THC formed a consortium with the Evergrande Real Estate Group and a Hong Kong-based fund to bid on the construction of the tallest skyscraper in Guangzhou. The bid fell apart when Evergrande withdrew during the global recession. In 2012, Trump Hotels opened an office in Shanghai and in 2014 entered into a branding and management partnership with the State Grid Corporation of China, China's largest state-owned company, for a major development in Beijing. The project was abandoned a few months into Trump's 2016 presidential campaign when Chinese authorities began a corruption investigation into State Grid.

==== Former licensees ====
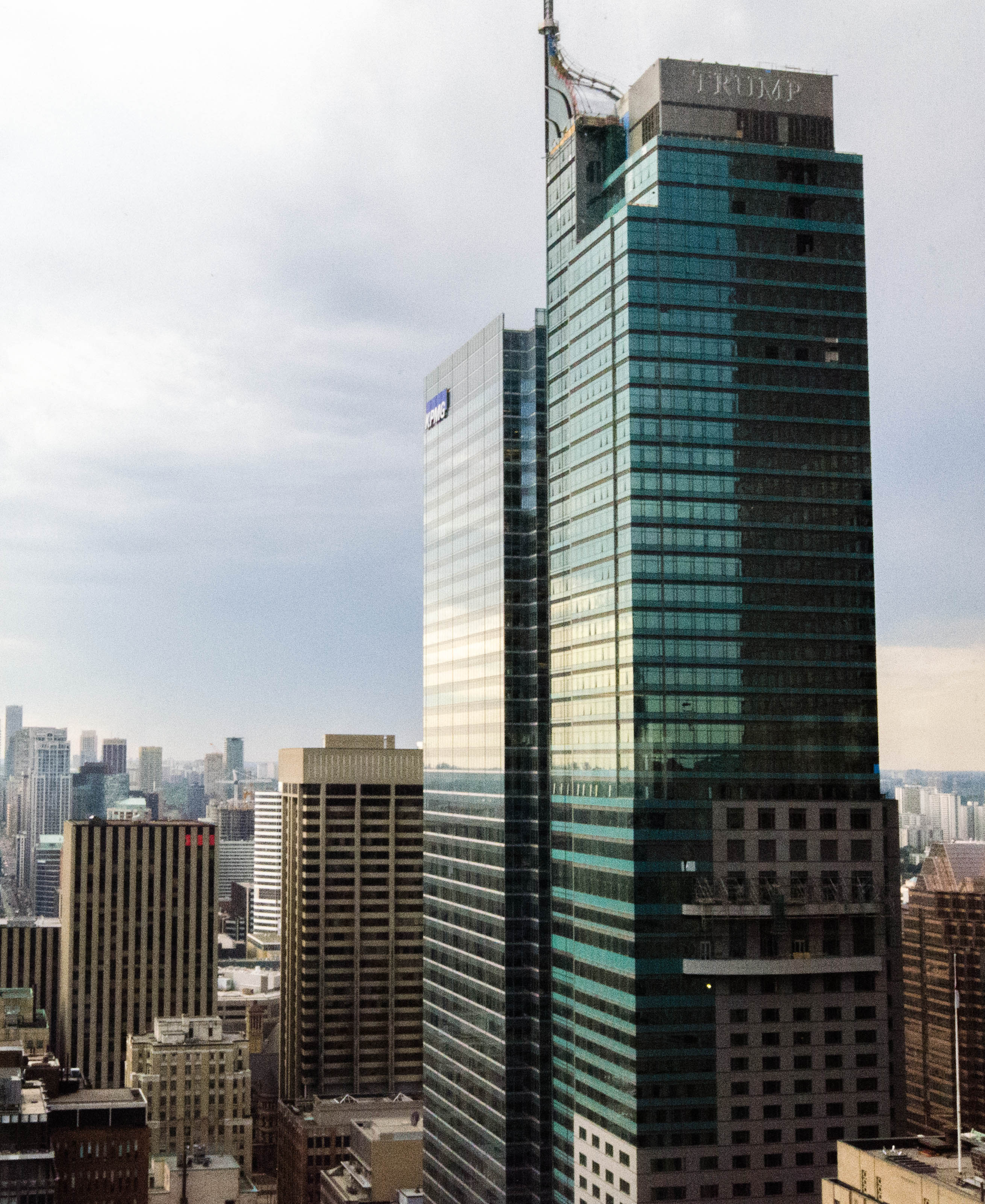
The former Trump International Hotel & Tower, Toronto

- St. Regis Toronto hotel and condo tower, formerly Trump International Hotel and Tower, was renamed Adelaide Hotel Toronto in 2017 and St. Regis Toronto in 2018, and management was taken over by Marriott International.
- JW Marriott Panama hotel and condo tower, formerly Trump Ocean Club International Hotel and Tower, Panama. Renamed JW Marriott Panama in 2019, management taken over by Marriott International.

==== Abandoned projects ====
- Trump Tower, Batumi. In 2011, Trump licensed his name to Silk Road Group, a company based in Georgia, for a Trump Tower to be built in Batumi, a city on the Black Sea in Georgia. The 47-story building was supposed to contain high-end condos, luxury shops, and a casino. In return for the license and a publicity campaign promoting the project, Trump received a fee of around $1 million up-front and 12% of all revenue for condos sold. Georgia president Mikheil Saakashvili hosted and accompanied Trump during his two-day visit to Georgia in April 2012, with both men praising each other, and awarded him the Presidential Order of Excellence. After Trump's election to the presidency, he cancelled the licensing agreement without refunding the fee.
- TD Trump Deutschland AG. Founded with a share capital of €4 million, the company initially intended to build a €4 billion 200-meter-tall skyscraper, 50 meters taller than local regulations allow, at Berlin's central Alexanderplatz. The company then made plans to build a 55-story, 220-meter-tall tower in the city of Stuttgart in southwest Germany, had an architect draw up plans, and was planning to start construction in 2002. Trump had not presented a finance plan, and the city, having started to doubt Trump's creditworthiness and not wanting to end up with an unfinished building for lack of financing, ended the construction approval procedure. Trump sued the city of Stuttgart for damages but the court ruled against him.

=== Former properties ===
- Central Park Carousel: In 2010, Trump took over the management of the merry-go-round located in Manhattan's Central Park, promising to revive it after its previous operator was removed by the city's parks department. The carousel generated $589,000 from annual admissions. The Trump Organization had a contract to operate the carousel through April 2021, and was awarded to another company in 2021.
- Empire State Building: Trump acquired 50 percent ownership of the iconic skyscraper in 1994. After failed efforts to gain control of the building by evicting the master leaseholder, he and his partner sold the building in 2002.
- General Motors Building at Trump International Plaza: Trump partnered with Conseco to buy the 50-story Manhattan office building in 1998, and then attached his name to it. The building was sold in 2003.
- Grand Hyatt New York: Trump partnered with Hyatt to purchase and renovate the historic Commodore Hotel. They reopened the hotel in 1980. Trump sold his stake to Hyatt in 1996.
- Plaza Hotel: A historic hotel in Manhattan. Trump purchased it in 1988. He gave up half of his ownership in a 1992 bankruptcy case, and sold the rest in 1995.
- Hotel St. Moritz: Trump bought this Manhattan hotel in 1985 for $72 million, and then sold it in 1988 for $180 million.
- Maison de L'Amitie: A 43,000-square-foot (4,000 m^{2}) oceanfront mansion in Palm Beach, Florida. Trump purchased this property for $41 million at a bankruptcy auction in 2004, renovated it for what he said was $3 million, then sold it to Russian oligarch Dmitry Rybolovlev for $95 million in 2008. The property had been appraised at $58.1 million in 2007. The property was at the time the most expensive house ever sold in the United States. Discussing the buyer of the property with a reporter for The Palm Beach Post as the sale was pending, Trump told her, "Don't say Russian"; the paper reported the buyer as "foreign". The sale was examined by the Mueller special counsel investigation in 2017.
- Trump Golf Links at Ferry Point: Trump assumed management of this New York City-owned golf course in 2015. The management contract was sold to Bally's Corporation in 2023.
- Trump Plaza: After closing in 2014, the 34-story hotel and casino building fell into disrepair and was dynamited in 2021.

=== Scion and American Idea hotels ===
Early in the Trump presidency, Eric Trump and Donald Trump Jr. announced the creation of two new signature hotel brands, Scion and American Idea, as "the next generation of the company". After initially announcing as many as thirty potential deals in their pipeline, the ventures were scrapped in early 2019, with only one uncompleted hotel in Mississippi.

== Other ventures and investments ==
Trump owns a wide variety of other enterprises outside real estate (which had an estimated 2013 value of $317.6 million). Other investments include a 17.2% stake in Parker Adnan, Inc. (formerly AdnanCo Group), a Bermuda-based financial services holdings company. He took in $1.1 million in men's wear licensing royalties. Trump earns $15,000 to $100,000 in book royalties and $2.2 million for his involvement with Trump Model Management every year. Until 2015, Trump owned the Miss Universe, Miss USA and Miss Teen USA pageants, collectively worth $15 million.

Trump has marketed his name on a large number of products and services achieving mixed success doing so. Though not all subsidiaries of the organization, some of Trump's external entrepreneurial and investment ventures include or have included:

- Trump Princess superyacht, construction of world's biggest yacht, and shipyard ownership. In 1987, Trump bought a superyacht, originally built for Adnan Khashoggi, from the Sultan of Brunei and renamed it the Trump Princess. He leased it to the Trump's Castle hotel and casino. It was berthed in Atlantic City and used for events by the Castle and other Trump enterprises. In 1989, he put the yacht up for sale and commissioned the world's biggest yacht to be built at Amsel Holland BV, a small shipyard in a Dutch fishing village. Construction began in November 1989. In April 1990, Trump bought the shipyard to ensure the work would continue. In June, the Dutch insurer for the lines of credit of several companies involved in the construction cancelled their default insurances, and work was halted. In July 1990, Trump sold the shipyard.
- Trump Financial (mortgage firm)
- Trump Sales and Leasing (residential sales)
- Trump International Realty (residential and commercial real estate brokerage firm)
- The Trump Entrepreneur Initiative (for profit business education company, formerly called Trump University)
- Trump Restaurants (located in Trump Tower and consisting of Trump Buffet, Trump Catering, Trump Ice Cream Parlor, and Trump Bar)
- GoTrump.com (former online travel search engine)
- Select By Trump (line of coffee drinks)
- Trump Drinks (energy drink for the Israeli and Palestinian markets)
- Donald J. Trump Signature Collection (a line of menswear, men's accessories, and watches)
- Fragrance product lines: Donald Trump The Fragrance (launched in 2004), Success (launched in 2012), Empire (launched in 2016)
- Trump Ice (line of bottled water)
- Trump Magazine
- Trump Golf
- Trump Chocolate
- Trump Home (home furnishings)
- Trump Productions (television production company)
- Trump Institute (2005–2009 traveling lecture series promoted by Trump as offering his "wealth-creating secrets and strategies")
- The Trump Network. From 2009 to 2011, Trump licensed his name to Ideal Health, a multilevel marketing company that sold vitamins and other supplements, which rebranded as Trump Network. Trump "pitched a 'recession-proof' opportunity during the economic downturn in 2009". The company collapsed within 2.5 years, the owners of the company filed for bankruptcy, and sold it in 2012.
- D.J. Trump. A thoroughbred racehorse Trump bought and named after himself in 1988 for $500,000. The horse never raced due to an infection, and died three years later in 1991.
- Trump: The Game (1989 board game with a 2004 re-release version tied to The Apprentice)
- Donald Trump's Real Estate Tycoon (business-simulation game)
- Trump books: a series of ghostwritten books credited to Trump
- Trump Model Management
- Trump Shuttle
- Trump Mortgage
- Trump Vodka
- DJT Restaurant and Bar, Trump International Hotel Las Vegas.
- Trump Steaks
- Trump Media & Technology Group (TMTG), technology company, it runs Trump's social media app 'TRUTH social'
- Trump Cards. In 2022, Trump licensed his "name, likeness and image" for the issuance of non-fungible tokens (NFTs), digital trading cards depicting Trump as a superhero, an Old West sheriff, and various other figures. The NFTs went on sale 30 days after Trump announced his candidacy in the 2024 presidential election but the initial announcement of the cards was made much earlier, at a time when he was expected to be announcing his presidential candidacy instead causing some to accuse Trump of bait and switch tactics. The 44,000 images were priced at $99 each and sold out the first day despite being widely ridiculed.
- Trump Sneakers. In February 2024, Trump introduced a line of three Trump-branded sneakers at a footwear convention. The products are manufactured and sold by 45Footware LLC, a company registered on January 31, 2024, under a license agreement with CIC Ventures LLC, a company owned by Trump. The company's website also sells perfume and cologne with a stopper shaped like Trump's head.

Two days after the assassination attempt on Trump on July 13, 2024, 45Footware LLC began offering a limited edition of 5,000 pairs of sneakers for $299 a pair. The high-tops featured an image of Trump with streaks of blood on his face and the words "fight, fight, fight" written in capital letters underneath the image.

- Official Trump Watch Collection. On September 26, 2024, a website operated by TheBestWatchesonEarth LLC began selling four models from the $499 basic model to the $100,000 "Trump Victory Tourbillon" gold and diamond-encrusted watch under a paid license agreement with Trump. The company's owners are unknown. Its business address is a virtual office registered two months earlier by its registered agent, a lawyer in Sheridan, Wyoming.
- $TRUMP and $MELANIA cryptocurrency tokens ("meme coins"), launched on January 18, 2025, and sold on a website operated by Fight Fight Fight LLC, a company owned by Trump Organization affiliate CIC Digital LLC and Celebration Cards LLC. The website says that the tokens are not intended to be an investment or security.
- Trump Mobile, a mobile virtual network operator, announced a gold-colored smartphone, which also includes a phone plan, with the cost in reference to Trump being the 45th and 47th president of the United States. The operator is owned by T1 Mobile, founded by Donald Trump Jr and Eric Trump.

In 2005, Trump reportedly received $1.5 million for a one-hour lecture at The Learning Annex Real Estate World Expo, with another seven events scheduled for a total fee of $12 million. In a court deposition two years later, Trump admitted that he was paid $400,000.

The Trump Organization also housed ventures started by Donald Trump's daughter Ivanka, including Ivanka Trump Fine Jewelry (a jewelry line) and the Ivanka Trump Lifestyle Collection (a high-end designer-fashion and cosmetics line that includes fragrances, footwear, handbags, outerwear and eyewear collections); the ventures were discontinued in 2017 and 2018, respectively.

In March 2024, Trump began promoting the $60 "God Bless the U.S.A. Bible", which features a King James translation of the Bible; the U.S. Constitution, Bill of Rights, Declaration of Independence, and Pledge of Allegiance; as well as the handwritten chorus of the Lee Greenwood song God Bless the U.S.A.. The website selling the Bible bills it as "the only Bible endorsed by" Trump and that his "name, likeness and image" are being used under a license agreement with one of Trump's organizations, CIC Ventures LLC. Copies hand-signed by Trump were available for $1,000. After the July 2024 attempt on Trump's life, Trump's name and the phrase "The Day God Intervened" were added to the cover of a version of the book. In October 2024, the Associated Press reported that in February and March 2024 close to 120,000 of the Bibles had been shipped from a Chinese company in Hangzhou. The paperwork filed with customs authorities showed an estimated value of under $3 per Bible. In financial disclosures filed with the Federal Election Commission in August 2024, Trump reported that sale of the Bibles had earned him $300,000.

=== ACN, Inc. ===
From 2005 to 2015, Trump was paid $8.8 million for promoting multi-level marketing telecommunications company ACN Inc. and its products on ACN's website, promotional DVDs and at their events, and on his The Apprentice reality-TV show.

In 2018, four investors filed a federal civil lawsuit in the Southern District of New York against Donald Trump and his children Donald Jr., Ivanka, and Eric for fraud and racketeering. In July 2019, a district judge permitted the lawsuit to proceed with state-level claims of fraud, false advertising, and unfair competition. The Trumps were accused of not having disclosed that they were being paid by ACN when they recommended the company as a sound investment. As part of the discovery process, the Trumps were ordered in March 2020 to provide information from Trump Organization business records back to 2005.

In April 2020, a federal judge ordered MGM, the majority owner of Celebrity Apprentice, to release unaired tapes of two episodes of the show to the attorneys of plaintiffs who accused the four Trumps of misleading them to invest in ACN; in the episodes, celebrity contestants competed to produce commercials for an ACN product. The Trumps appealed the ruling and unsuccessfully sought to deal with the dispute via arbitration. In November 2021, a federal judge ordered MGM to make the tapes available to the plaintiffs' attorneys at a secure location.

Trump and his children were deposed in 2022. In May 2023, the plaintiffs withdrew their claims against the children in order to "streamline the dispute ahead of a trial". The trial is scheduled for January 29, 2024.

== Coats of arms ==
The coat of arms granted to Davies in 1939

The differenced coat of arms used by Trump

The coat of arms granted by the Lord Lyon to the Trump International Golf Club Scotland Ltd in 2011

Donald Trump has used a number of logos in the style of coats of arms for his businesses.

Joseph E. Davies, third husband of Marjorie Merriweather Post and a former U.S. ambassador of Welsh origins, was granted a coat of arms, bearing the motto Integritas, by British heraldic authorities in 1939. After Donald Trump purchased Mar-a-Lago, the Florida estate built by Merriweather Post, in 1985, the Trump Organization started using Davies's coat of arms at Trump golf courses and estates across the country. A differenced version of the Davies arms were also registered with the U.S. patent and trademark office. The modified arms are what is currently used by Trump and his organizations, outside the British Isles.

Shield

Argent ermined Or, two Chevronels couped between three demi-Lions, all Or.

Crest

A Cubit Arm erected Argent, enfiling a Mascle and holding a Spear point upward, all Or.

In 2008, Trump attempted to establish the American logo at his new Trump International Golf Links in Balmedie, Scotland, but was warned by the Lord Lyon King of Arms, the highest authority for Scottish heraldry, that an act of the Scottish Parliament from 1672 disallows people using unregistered arms. In January 2012, shortly after the inauguration of the golf course, Trump unveiled the new coat of arms that had been granted to "The Trump International Golf Club Scotland Ltd" by the Lord Lyon in 2011.

Sarah Malone, executive vice-president of "The Trump International Golf Links, Scotland", said that "the coat of arms brings together visual elements that signify different aspects of the Trump family heritage [...], the Lion Rampant [in the crest] makes reference to Scotland and the stars to America. Three chevronels are used to denote the sky, sand dunes and sea – the essential components of the site, and the double-[headed] Eagle represents the dual nature and nationality of Trump's heritage (Scottish and German). The Eagle clutches golf balls making reference to the great name of golf, and the motto Numquam Concedere is Latin for Never Give Up – Trump's philosophy."

From 2014, Trump used the same logo for "The Trump International Golf Links, Ireland", the golf resort built from his acquisition of Doonbeg Golf Club.

Shield

Party per chevron: Azure two Mullets Argent; Vert a double headed Eagle of the second, wings displayed and inverted, armed and langued Gules, holding in its talons two Globes of the second; overall three chevronels Or.

Crest

A demi-Lion rampant Gules, armed and langued Azure, holding in the paws a Pennon Or flowing to the sinister.

Battle cry

"Numquam concedere" (Latin for "Never Give Up").

== See also ==
- Timeline of investigations into Donald Trump and Russia
- False or misleading statements by Donald Trump
- Trump Media & Technology Group (a separate company owned by Donald Trump not part of The Trump Organization)
