= Zitro International =

Luxembourg-based slot machine company

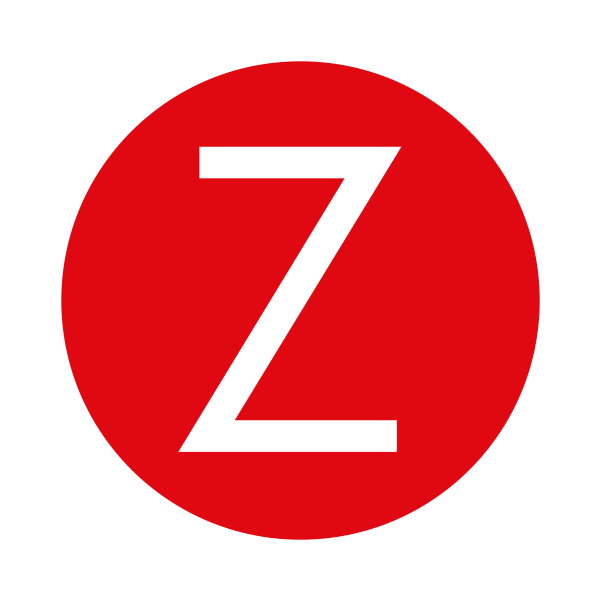
- Industry: Gambling
- Founded: 2007
- Founder: Johnny Ortiz
- Headquarters: Luxembourg
- Website: zitrogames.com

Zitro International S.A.R.L is a Luxembourg-based company that manufactures slot machines used in gambling venues.

== History ==
Zitro was established in 2007 by Johnny Ortiz, initially focusing on Video Bingo, which has remained a key part of its product portfolio since the company's inception.

In 2016, the company expanded its offerings by introducing its first Video Slot games, implementing a customized system for BET bingo halls, and launching its Zitro Digital division to enter the online gambling market.

Over the years, Zitro has received several industry recognitions. In 2022, its game Wheel of Legends was named "Slot Machine of the Year" at the BEGE Awards. That same year, Johnny Ortiz was recognized as "Business Man of the Year" by AZAR Magazine. Earlier, in 2021, the Association of Gaming Equipment Manufacturers (AGEM) honored Sebastián Salat with the Jens Halle Memorial Award for his contributions to the industry.

Further acknowledgments followed, including Sebastián Salat being named among the Intelligence Hot 50 in 2024 for his influence in the gambling sector. Zitro also received the "Top Performing Game - LATAM" award for Epic Kingdom at the 2023 EKG Slot Awards Show hosted by Eilers & Krejcik Gaming. In 2024, the company's Altius Glare was awarded “Best Slot Machine” at the European Casino Awards.

In 2025, Sebastián Salat was honored with the Outstanding Contribution Award at the European Casino Awards, recognizing his extensive career and lasting impact on the gambling industry.

At the EXPOJOC 2026 awards ceremony, Zitro was recognized with the “Innovation Award”, further underscoring the company's commitment to innovation in the sector, and Manuela Jimenez was awarded the “Special Award” for her.

Zitro continues to grow its technological capabilities, operating Technology Campuses in Barcelona and Bangalore.
