= TD Trump Deutschland =

Once proposed building venture in Germany

TD Trump Deutschland AG (German for "TD Trump Germany AG") was a venture by Donald Trump planning to trade and build skyscrapers in Germany. In cooperation with Marseille-Kliniken Hamburg, The Trump Organization agreed in August 2000 to found TD Trump Deutschland AG with a common capital stock of €4 million, split equally as 2 million for each partner company.

TD Trump Deutschland AG initially planned to build a residential tower in Berlin's central Alexanderplatz area. Trump's German business partner Hans Ulrich Gruber described Trump's aim as "to build a bridge between Berlin and New York." However, his plan for the tallest building in Germany in the capital city was stymied by Berlin's relatively low (150 m) limit for new building height.

The company settled on Pragsattel (Stuttgart) for the construction of what was to be a 55-story (220 m tall) building named Trump Tower, which would have been the highest building in south Germany. The project investment was estimated at 250 million Euro. Plans by architect Peter Paul Schweger for the project were presented in October 2001.

In January 2003, the city of Stuttgart finally refused the permission to build the tower, foreseeing that TD Trump Deutschland AG could not solve its difficulties in securing necessary financing.

The company was dissolved in April 2005.

== Staff ==
- Ulrich Marseille, Trump's co-shareholder and the owner and founder of the Marseille Plastic Surgery Clinics in Hamburg.
- CEO (Vorstand): Hans Ulrich Gruber (former CEO of ThyssenKrupp)
- Supervisory council (Aufsichtsrat): Ulrich Marseille (chair), Donald Trump (vice chair), George H. Ross, Dino S. Bradley, Estella-Maria Marseille, Hans-Hermann Tiedje

== Lawsuits ==
TD Trump Deutschland AG brought a suit against the city of Stuttgart for compensation following the city's decision to rescind permission to build the tower. The company lost that lawsuit in 2004.

On 22 December 2004, Marseille-Kliniken AG filed a lawsuit against the Trump Organization in the regional court of Landgericht Berlin. In the initial formation of the two companies' partnership, payment of the share capital of EUR 2 million by Trump Organization Inc. was pre-financed by Marseille-Kliniken AG. Subsequently, the suit claimed, the Trump Organization did not comply with its contractual obligations of the partnership formation. Marseille-Kliniken AG thus asked for repayment of the EUR 2 million it had pre-financed for Trump. The lawsuit was filed in New York.

In June 2005 the German state attorney prosecuted TD Trump Deutschland AG for alleged accounting fraud.

== See also ==
- List of things named after Donald Trump
