= Donald J. Trump Foundation =

US-based private foundation (1988–2018 shutdown by court)

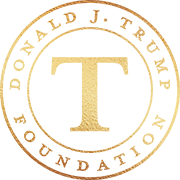
- Formation: 1988; 38 years ago
- Founder: Donald Trump
- Type: 501(c)3
- Tax ID no.: 13-3404773
- Legal status: Undergoing court-ordered dissolution
- Headquarters: New York City, New York
- Location: United States

The Donald J. Trump Foundation was a New York–based tax-exempt private foundation formed in 1988 by Donald Trump and dissolved by court order in 2018 after various legal violations came to light.

The foundation was created to receive royalties from Trump's 1987 book Trump: The Art of the Deal as well as donations from others, for the stated purpose of distributing the funds to charitable causes. Trump's children Ivanka, Eric, and Donald Jr. served on the board, which did not meet after 1999. Trump stopped contributing to the foundation in 2008, but continued to solicit donations.

The foundation's activities came under scrutiny during the 2016 presidential election campaign, initially by The Washington Post's David Fahrenthold. Law enforcement investigators subsequently discovered various ethical and legal violations, including failure to register in New York, self-dealing and illegal campaign contributions. In December 2016, Trump tried to dissolve the foundation, but the New York State Attorney General's office blocked dissolution pending completion of its investigations. Trump served as its president until January 2017, three days after his inauguration as U.S. president.

On June 14, 2018, New York attorney general Barbara Underwood filed a civil suit against the foundation, Trump himself, and Trump's adult children—Ivanka, Eric and Donald Jr.—alleging "a shocking pattern of illegality" with respect to the foundation's money. On December 18, 2018, Underwood announced that the foundation had agreed to shut down under court supervision and distribute its remaining assets to court-approved charities, although she did not end investigations of the foundation and its directors. In November 2019, Trump admitted to using the foundation for his business and political purposes and was ordered to pay $2 million as restitution. Additionally, Trump was required to reimburse $11,525 to the foundation, which was added to $1,797,598.30 already in the foundation's bank account. The money as well as the funds in the foundation's bank were paid to eight charities in December 2019.

The winding down of the foundation and the settlement did not end investigations of the foundation and its directors nor resolve any other potential prosecutions of Trump and others arising from the dealings by or through the foundation. On February 22, 2021, the Supreme Court in Trump v. Vance rejected any further delay in the production of Trump's tax records by Trump's accountants Mazars, under an August 2019 subpoena. Mazars handed over to Vance millions of pages of documents containing Trump's tax returns from January 2011 to August 2019, as well as financial statements, engagement agreements, documents relating to the preparation and review of tax returns, and work papers and communications related to the tax returns.

== Overview ==
=== Stated purpose and structure ===
Donald Trump formed the Donald J. Trump Foundation in 1988 as a private foundation. Its initial stated purpose was to distribute proceeds from Trump's book,Trump: The Art of the Deal, to charitable causes. Like many other private foundations, the Trump Foundation conducted no charitable programs of its own, instead granting money to other tax-exempt organizations.

The foundation was based at the Trump Organization in New York City and had no paid staff or dedicated office space. Donald Trump was its president until January 2017, three days after his inauguration as U.S. president. Trump's three adult children – Ivanka Trump, Eric Trump and Donald Trump Jr. – were all listed as on the board of directors, as was the Trump Organization's treasurer/CFO Allen Weisselberg. In 2017, Weisselberg claimed in a deposition to New York State investigators that he wasn't aware he was a board member "at least for the last 10 or 15 years". According to the New York attorney general, the board had not met after 1999. In 2015, a Trump Organization spokesperson told the New York Post that Trump made all decisions regarding the granting of the foundation's money. According to the foundation's IRS Form 990 filing for 2013, in making grants the directors were not subject to any "restrictions or limitations on awards such as by geographical areas, charitable fields, kinds of institutions, or other factors".

=== Sources of funds ===
Until 2015, Trump contributed $5.5 million to the Trump Foundation, including money from his book, while outside donors contributed an additional $9.3 million. From 1987 to 2006, Trump gave his foundation $5.4 million which had been spent by the end of 2006. After donating a total of $65,000 in 2007–2008, he stopped donating any personal funds to the charity. His final payment to the foundation was $35,000 in 2008.

Many of the outside donors to the foundation have done business with Trump or the Trump Organization. Several philanthropy experts said having a family foundation primarily funded by outside money is unusual.

The top donors to the foundation from 2004 to 2014 were Vince and Linda McMahon of World Wrestling Entertainment (WWE), or WWE itself. $5 million was donated to the foundation after Trump appeared at WrestleMania in 2007 and 2009. The donations were reported by the Trump Foundation as coming from the WWE, but the WWE has claimed money came from Vince and Linda McMahon personally. Later, when Linda McMahon was running for U.S. Senate in Connecticut, the McMahons claimed the funds came from Vince only. Some have alleged that the money was paid as compensation to Trump and therefore should have been subject to payroll taxes.

Trump solicited donations in lieu of payment for other services as well. In 2005 Norwegian Cruise Line donated $100,000 in lieu of an appearance fee for Melania Trump. In 2006, People magazine donated $150,000 for an exclusive right to publish baby photos of Barron Trump. In 2011 Comedy Central donated $400,000 for Trump's appearance in a broadcast comedy roast of himself.

=== Dissolution ===
In September 2016 the New York attorney general's office, which administers the state's Charities Bureau, announced it was investigating the Trump Foundation based on its failure to file required forms with the bureau. One week later the office issued a "Notice of Violation".

In December 2016, one month before his inauguration, then president-elect Trump announced that he would dissolve the Trump Foundation to avoid "even the appearance of any conflict with [his] role as President". However, the office of the New York State Attorney General Eric Schneiderman blocked the dissolution, saying the foundation "cannot legally dissolve" until its current investigation is completed.

In June 2018 the same office filed a civil suit against the Trump Foundation and its board members, ordering (among other requirements) that it be shut down and that restitution be made by its board members. The office also referred information on possible legal violations to the FEC and the IRS. The following month, the New York State governor's chief counsel announced that Governor Andrew Cuomo was ready to provide the state's attorney general's office with the requisite criminal referral in the matter for possible criminal prosecution under state law. In December of that year, the foundation signed a stipulation agreement to dissolve, with its assets going only to charities approved by the attorney general's office. Soon after, Attorney General Underwood announced that the foundation had agreed to shut down under court supervision and distribute its remaining assets to court-approved charities, although she did not end investigations of the foundation and its directors.

== Investigations by The Washington Post and others ==
During the 2016 U.S. presidential election, David Fahrenthold of The Washington Post began looking into Trump's history of charitable giving. In January 2016, Trump held a fundraiser for veterans' causes in lieu of appearing at a televised Republican debate. He claimed that the event raised $6 million, including $1 million of his own money. Fahrenthold began his investigation by attempting to verify the receipt and disbursal of the $6 million. All donations were supposed to have gone into the Trump Foundation and then granted by the foundation to others. Fahrenthold determined instead that, several months after the rally, the Trump Foundation had yet to disburse funds to any veteran-related charities. Although some of the funds went directly to causes without passing through the Trump Foundation, Fahrenthold widened his investigation into a larger investigation into Trump's history of charitable giving. In the November 2019 settlement ordering Trump to pay $2 million in damages, he acknowledged that the veterans' fundraiser had been a campaign event and that his campaign had been given full control of the raised funds.

In June 2016, in response to criticism, Trump asserted publicly that he had given about $102 million to charitable causes from 2009 through 2015 and released a 93-page list of more than 4,800 donations. Just under $90 million of the total was in the form of conservation easements on Trump properties or land donations to the State of New York; the list also contained more than 2,900 donations of free rounds of golf. Further investigations led to an increasing list of allegations of abuse inside the foundation since its creation.

Fahrenthold's investigation into the Trump Foundation and Trump's history of personal charitable giving involved hundreds of calls to charities associated with Donald Trump; it was also notable in that he drew heavily on support and investigative help from a large number of his Twitter followers who helped him track down leads on specific charities.

Fahrenthold received the 2017 Pulitzer Prize for National Reporting for his investigations into the Trump Foundation.

== Legal and ethical controversies ==
External audio
- *Journalist Says Trump Foundation May Have Engaged In 'Self-Dealing'", 37:18, September 28, 2016, Fresh Air with Terry Gross Interview with David Fahrenthold

Accusations against Trump and his foundation include the following:

=== Failure to maintain proper governance ===
In a June 2018 petition filed by the office of the New York attorney general, it was explained that:

... none of the Foundation's expenditures or activities were approved by its Board of Directors. The investigation found that the Board existed in name only: it did not meet after 1999; it did not set policy or criteria for choosing grant recipients, and it did not approve of any grants. Mr. Trump alone made all decisions related to the Foundation.

In an exhibit attached to the filing, Trump Foundation treasurer Allen Weisselberg claimed he had not been aware that he was the treasurer or on the board of the foundation until he was approached by investigators.

=== Solicitation of donations without a license ===
Under New York State law, a not-for-profit foundation must register as a "7A Charitable Organization" if it plans to solicit outside donations over $25,000 in any year. The Trump Foundation was initially registered as a private foundation set up solely to receive his own personal donations. As long as it was private and did not solicit outside funds, it did not have to file annual audited reports with the New York State Charities Bureau. However, records show that Trump began soliciting donations at least as early as 2004 and possibly as early as 1989.

=== Mishandling of funds raised for veterans' causes ===
In April 2016, Fox News reported that more than two months after Trump said he had raised $6 million for military veterans at a pre-Iowa caucus fundraiser, "most of the organizations targeted to receive the money have gotten less than half of that amount". Around that time, Trump also said he had contributed $1,000,000 of his personal funds. In late May, Trump revised his figures downward, saying $5.6 million had been raised at the event and that he had contributed his one million only the previous week, after the media criticized him. He also provided a list of the beneficiaries of the $5.6 million, although the full amount is disputed in a lawsuit filed by New York State in 2018, which cites an amount of $2.8 million.

=== Coordinating foundation grants with Trump's presidential campaign ===
Trump may have used Trump Foundation grants to advance his presidential campaign, in violation of rules barring charities from engaging in political activity. Trump distributed at least some of the funds publicly at "Donald Trump for President" rallies, displaying large-size donation checks that included his campaign slogan "Make America Great Again" or a link to a campaign website.

Trump Organization CFO Allen Weisselberg testified in an October 2017 deposition that he had witnessed Donald Trump's campaign staff coordinate with Trump to use the Iowa fundraiser to benefit the campaign. In 2018, New York State attorney general Barbara Underwood alleged in a larger suit against the foundation that Trump, in using the foundation to promote his campaign during and after the Iowa fundraiser, had violated charities laws.

=== Grants to the National Museum of Catholic Art and History ===
In each of 1995 and 1999, the Trump Foundation granted $50,000 to the National Museum of Catholic Art and History. A 2001 report by The Village Voice stated, after visiting the museum in East Harlem, that the facility had "next to no art" and no official connection to the Catholic Church, despite a ten-year record of having solicited large-scale donations for its collection. The Voice and, later, The Washington Post, concluded that Trump may have directed the grants to the museum to curry favor with the museum's then-chairman, Eddie Malloy, who was also head of the Building and Construction Trades Council of Greater New York. The council had worked on behalf of one of the unions of workers who worked on Trump construction projects.

=== Failure to make pledged 9/11 grants ===
An investigation by the New York City Comptroller's office in October 2016 showed that Trump and/or the Donald Trump Foundation may have failed to honor at least one pledge to charities established to provide relief for victims of the September 11, 2001, terrorist attacks. Trump had made a pledge of $10,000 to the Twin Towers Fund on The Howard Stern Show in late September 2001. The Twin Towers Fund, later administered as part of the New York City Public and Private Initiative, was created by New York City Mayor Rudy Giuliani "to benefit the families of firefighters and police officers who died in the attacks".

During the 2016 Republican National Convention, Giuliani announced that Trump had made unspecified "anonymous" donations after the September 11 attacks, although such donations have not been identified. Giuliani also said, in support of Trump's candidacy, "Every time New York City suffered a tragedy Donald Trump was there to help ... He's not going to like my telling you this but he did it anonymously."

The New York City Comptroller's office told the New York Daily News it had manually reviewed "approximately 1,500 pages of donor records of the Twin Towers Fund and the related entity NYC Public/Private Initiatives Inc., containing the names of more than 110,000 individuals and entities that were collected as part of the audits" through August 2012. According to the News, Comptroller Scott Stringer "found that Trump and [the Trump Foundation] hadn't donated a dime in the months after 9/11"; however, because the reviewed period covered only one year after the attacks, the Comptroller's office was "unable to conclude definitively" that Trump never gave to the fund after August 2002. According to its IRS Form 990 tax filings, the Trump Foundation made no grants to the Twin Towers Fund or to NYC Public/Private Initiatives, Inc. from 2002 through 2014, although Trump may have made personal donations after August 2002 that would not have shown up in these filings.

In 2016, after the convention, Trump's campaign suggested that the Trump Foundation made a grant to the American Red Cross after the attacks; however, no record of it exists in the foundation's tax filings from 2001 through 2014. As with the Twin Towers Fund, if Trump instead had made a personal donation, it would not have shown up in the foundation's records.

=== Using Trump Foundation money to settle Trump Organization legal disputes ===
Trump may have used foundation money to settle his personal or business legal disputes on at least two occasions.

In 2007, Trump used Trump Foundation funds to settle a 2006 legal dispute between the Town of Palm Beach, Florida, and Trump's Mar-a-Lago country club. The town said the club's flagpole violated town height limit rules and levied a daily accruing fine against the club. The club's flagpole was 80 feet tall, 38 feet above limits imposed by the town. Palm Beach began fining Trump $1,250 per day for the violation. Trump countersued Palm Beach for $25 million on US constitutional grounds for restricting his 1st amendment rights of free speech and his 14th amendment rights of equal protection. The suit alleged that at least twenty other properties had violated the height restrictions but were not similarly fined. It also alleged that a shorter flagpole "would fail to appropriately express the magnitude of Donald J. Trump's ... patriotism". Trump eventually reached a legal settlement with Palm Beach after, according to the Sun Sentinel, "secret, court-ordered negotiations". Settlement documents show that Trump, in return for discharging the club's obligations to Palm Beach, had agreed to personally donate $100,000 to Fischer House, a charity benefitting veterans and military families. However, Trump then made the grant using foundation money, not his own.

Trump's foundation paid $158,000 to the Martin B. Greenberg Foundation as settlement of a suit brought by Greenberg against the Trump National Golf Club Westchester in Briarcliff Manor, New York. Greenberg alleged that he had rightfully won a $1 million prize for scoring a hole-in-one in a 2010 charity golf tournament at the club but the club had denied the award on technical grounds, arguing the hole was shorter than the required 150 yards. Martin Greenberg sued and a settlement was reached at a significantly reduced amount. The Washington Post reported that "on the day that Trump and the other parties told the court that they had settled the case, the Donald J. Trump Foundation made its first and only grant to the Martin B. Greenberg Foundation, for $158,000." In September 2016, the Post reported that the grant was directly linked to the legal settlement, likely violating IRS self-dealing rules by using charitable funds to pay Trump's personal or business obligations. To raise the money needed to make the settlement, the Trump Foundation auctioned a prize of lifetime golf membership at Trump-owned golf courses, with the winning bid bringing a $157,000 donation to the Trump Foundation to the foundation to offset the payment to the Greenberg Foundation. The winner of the auction may have believed he was donating to Trump Foundation charitable causes.

According to the Trump Foundation's publicly available tax returns, Trump National Golf Club Westchester paid over $200,000 to the Trump Foundation in 2016, with $158,000 of the funds designated as repayment of the foundation funds used toward the Martin B. Greenberg settlement.

=== Donation to Florida attorney general Pam Bondi ===
In 2013, the Trump Foundation donated $25,000 in support of Florida attorney general Pam Bondi's election campaign while Bondi's office was reviewing fraud allegations against Trump University, a for-profit real estate program. Around that time Trump also hosted a fundraiser for Bondi at his Mar-a-Lago resort at a fee well below his normal market rate. Bondi's office later ended the investigation without bringing charges.

According to a Trump Foundation attorney, "the [$25,000] contribution was made in error due to a case of mistaken identity of organizations with the same name." Trump later personally reimbursed his foundation for the $25,000. The foundation paid a $2,500 fine for violating IRS rules against political contributions by charitable organizations. In 2016 New York attorney general Eric Schneiderman said publicly that the Trump Foundation was the subject of an ongoing investigation by his office.

Citizens for Responsibility and Ethics in Washington (CREW), a not-for-profit watchdog group, filed a complaint with the IRS (see below). It also cast doubt on Trump's story after obtaining a letter from the Trump Foundation's attorney to the New York attorney general's office. "We're past the point where a reasonable person could believe this is just a never-ending series of once in a lifetime errors", said CREW Communications Director Jordan Libowitz. "This may not be anything nefarious, but if it isn't, that would mean that the Trump operation is completely inept when it comes to running the Trump Foundation."

On October 5, 2016, The Wall Street Journal reported details of how Trump had on several other occasions since as early as the 1980s made campaign donations to various US state attorneys general while they had been reviewing cases involving the Trump Organization or Trump personally, although the Bondi case is the only one it cited as having involved Trump Foundation money.

=== Grants allegedly made for political purposes ===
Trump paid $100,000 of Trump Foundation funds in 2012 to Reverend Franklin Graham's Billy Graham Evangelical Association. NBC News has called Graham "an early ally" of Trump. "The more you listen to him, the more you say to yourself, 'You know, maybe the guy's right'", Graham had told ABC News in 2011. In October 2016 Graham revealed to the Charlotte Observer that in 2012 he had instructed Trump to make the $100,000 donation, and that the money was used to pay for full-page ads urging voters to support candidates in the 2012 presidential election who supported "biblical values". The Observer has suggested the timing and tone of the ads indicate they were placed in support of Mitt Romney's campaign.

Graham also heads Boone, North Carolina–based Samaritan's Purse, a Christian relief agency that received $25,000 from the Trump Foundation in 2012. Graham credits Fox News anchor Greta Van Susteren for having solicited that donation. Van Susteren and her TV crew had accompanied Graham on Samaritan's Purse trips to Haiti and North Korea. The Charlotte Observer quoted Graham saying, "[Trump] was on her show, and [Van Susteren] said, 'I was just in Haiti and Samaritan's Purse is doing this down there, and Donald, you need to help.' He sent a check out." In 2016, several media outlets alleged that Van Susteren had been producing overtly pro-Trump reports on her Fox News show On the Record.

In 2014 the Trump Foundation made a $100,000 grant to the Citizens United Foundation, a charitable foundation closely related to David Bossie's conservative group, Citizens United. At the time Citizens United was engaged in a lawsuit against New York State attorney general Eric Schneiderman, whose office was pursuing a civil suit against Trump University. It was the largest single grant made by the Trump Foundation that year. Schneiderman's office called the grant part of a "vendetta" by Trump, while Citizens United rejected any connection between the grant and its own suit against Schneiderman. The Trump Foundation's 2014 tax filing misidentified Citizens United as a public charity (501(c)(3)) when it is in fact a social welfare organization (501(c)(4)).

The Trump Foundation donated a total of $40,000 from 2011 through 2013 to the Drumthwacket Foundation, a charitable organization formed to pay for renovation and historic preservation of the New Jersey governor's mansion of the same name. In 2011, Trump was seeking to acquire permits to build a personal cemetery on the fairway at the Trump National Golf Club in New Jersey and may have needed political help in obtaining approval for the permit.

Trump directed $100,000 of Trump Foundation money toward the National September 11 Memorial Museum days before the 2016 New York State Republican presidential primary, where he was on the ballot, mischaracterizing the foundation grant as a personal donation.

In May 2015, the Trump Foundation granted $10,000 to Project Veritas, a news organisation run by conservative filmmaker James O'Keefe. In October 2016, O'Keefe released video which purportedly reveals how Democrats incited violence at Trump rallies. During the third 2016 presidential debate, Trump claimed that new videos produced by O'Keefe and released that week proved Hillary Clinton and Barack Obama had "hired people" and "paid them $1,500" to "be violent, cause fights, [and] do bad things" at Trump rallies. A Democratic National Committee spokesman noted Trump's donation after Project Veritas released another video on the 2016 presidential election. A Project Veritas spokesman said the Trump Foundation's donation "didn't impact our actions one way or the other" and were a small part of the organization's budget.

Trump may have strategically directed money from the Trump Foundation to support his presidential campaign. In one case, the grants were used specifically to pay for newspaper ads. In October 2016 RealClearPolitics reported that Trump directed significant amounts of foundation money to conservative organizations, possibly in return for political support and access. The news organization found that, from 2011 through 2014, Trump had "harnessed his eponymous foundation to send at least $286,000 to influential conservative or policy groups ... In many cases, this flow of money corresponded to prime speaking slots or endorsements that aided Trump as he sought to recast himself as a plausible Republican candidate for president." At least two of the groups are based in Republican-leaning early presidential primary states. In addition to Citizens United (above), groups include Iowa's The Family Leader, the South Carolina Palmetto Family Council, the American Conservative Union, and the American Spectator Foundation. Trump's granting of foundation money to these groups could have violated the law, if it was in return for his personal right to speak or gain access to networking events.

- The Trump Foundation's grant of $10,000 in 2013 to The Family Leader may have led to a speaking engagement for Trump. The Family Leader is an Iowa-based organization whose stated mission is to "strengthen families, by inspiring Christ-like leadership in the home, the church, and the government". Following the grant, the group's leader, Vader Plaats, invited Trump to speak at its leadership summit. These grants may also have been illegal because The Family Leader is a 501(c)(4) corporation established to "develop, advocate and support legislative agenda at the state level" and not a charity. The Trump Foundation is prohibited from donating money for non-charity purposes. However, Trump may have intended to make a grant to The Family Leader's affiliated foundation, The Family Leader Foundation, a 501(c)(3) charitable foundation.
- Trump was invited to speak at the American Conservative Union's Conservative Political Action Conference ("CPAC") in 2013 after directing $50,000 of Trump Foundation money to the organization. Also in 2013, Trump was invited to speak to the Economic Club of Washington after the Trump Foundation made a grant there.

=== Partial payment of an assessment owed by the Plaza Hotel ===
In 1989, the Trump Foundation paid more than half a "voluntary assessment" imposed on the Plaza Hotel by the Central Park Conservancy. The hotel was owned by the Trump Organization at the time and the assessment was for the renovation of the severely dilapidated Pulitzer Fountain at Grand Army Plaza, which directly faced the hotel. Toward the $500,000 assessment, the foundation granted $264,631 to the Conservancy while the Trump Organization paid between $100,000 and $250,000. The grant to the Conservancy was the largest single grant made by the Trump Foundation from inception through at least 2015.

=== Purchasing goods and services for personal or business benefit with foundation money ===
- On three occasions, Trump used the foundation's money to purchase artists' portraits of himself.
  - In 2007, Trump spent $20,000 in Trump Foundation funds to purchase a six-foot-tall portrait of himself by artist Michael Israel at a benefit for a Florida charity, the Children's Place at Homespace, held at his Mar-a-Lago country club in Florida after his wife Melania Trump made the highest bid. The painter's former production manager told The Washington Post that he had, at the request of Trump's wife Melania, shipped the painting to the Trump National Golf Club Westchester in Briarcliff Manor, New York, allegedly for display in the country club's boardroom or conference room. The charity paid half the proceeds, $10,000, to the artist for the painting, which established that the painting had a fair market value of at least that amount. Tax experts told the Post that if it was displayed at the golf club, it could violate Internal Revenue Service rules prohibiting non-profits from self-dealing, i.e. charitable funding of a noncharitable purpose. In September 2016, President Barack Obama publicly criticized Trump's purchase of the painting.
  - In 2019, former Trump Organization attorney Michael Cohen testified to the House Committee on Oversight that in 2013 Trump had used a straw purchaser, billionaire Stewart Rahr, to ensure a portrait of himself would be sold for the highest price. Rahr paid $60,000 for a 9-foot tall portrait of Trump by artist William Quigley. He was reimbursed with money from the Trump Foundation. After the sale, Trump tweeted "Just found out that at a charity auction of celebrity portraits in E. Hampton, my portrait by artist William Quigley topped the list at $60K." Trump kept the painting.
  - In 2014, at a charity for the Unicorn Children's Foundation, held at his Mar-a-Lago resort, Trump purchased a four-foot-tall portrait of himself in the 1990s by Argentine artist Havi Schanz and paid for it with $20,000 of Trump Foundation funds. A photo of the portrait was found on a TripAdvisor review of Trump National Doral Miami. Later, a reporter for Univision went to the club, asked the various staff about the painting and eventually discovered it hanging on a wall at the golf resort's Champions Bar & Grill restaurant. Trump presidential campaign spokesperson Boris Epshteyn said that Trump's use of the painting at Trump's Champions Bar & Grill was not "absolutely proper" under an IRS rule allowing individuals to store items "on behalf of the foundation—in order to help with storage costs" and that Trump was "doing his foundation a favor" by using the portrait on the restaurant wall.
- In 2008, Trump used $107,000 of Trump Foundation funds to purchase a luxury trip to Paris, including a meeting with actress Salma Hayek, at a charity auction for the Gucci Foundation.
- In 2012, Trump bid $12,000 at a charity auction, hosted at his Mar-a-lago club, to purchase an NFL football helmet autographed by Tim Tebow, as well as a Tebow jersey. While Trump was given credit for personal generosity in newspaper accounts, the purchase was made with foundation money, not his own. The current whereabouts of the helmet and jersey are unknown. Tax law experts say if Trump kept them, the purchase might have violated the self-dealing rule, which bans private foundations from "the furnishing of goods" to their officers.
- The Palm Beach Post has suggested that Trump benefited personally when the Trump Foundation made grants totaling $20,000 during 2012 through 2014 in return for band and choir performances held at his resorts.
- In 2013, the Trump Foundation made a $5,000 grant to the non-profit D.C. Preservation League. According to The Washington Post, the nonprofit's support helped the Trump Organization obtain the rights to convert Washington, D.C.'s historic Old Post Office Pavilion into the Trump International Hotel. In acknowledgment of the donation, the Trump Foundation received ads in the event programs; the ads promoted Trump's hotels rather than the foundation, in possible violation of IRS self-dealing rules.

=== Diversion of taxable income to the foundation as donations ===
The Washington Post reported in September 2016 that Donald Trump had directed that $2.3 million owed to him and his organization by various people and organizations should be paid instead to his foundation as donations, possibly evading personal income taxes. The Post found old Associated Press coverage showing that Trump may have started directing income to the Trump Foundation as early as 1989. IRS rules prohibit individuals from diverting taxable income owed to them toward charities if they benefit directly from those charities unless the individual declares the income on his tax forms. Since Trump had yet to release his income taxes at that time, the Post was unable to confirm if the income was declared for any of the donations received.

The Trump Foundation received at least $1.9 million from ticket broker Richard Ebers. Richard Ebers had bought goods and services, including tickets, from "Trump or his businesses"; he was allegedly instructed to make payment for them to the Trump Foundation in the form of charitable contributions instead of as income for the Trump organization.

The Trump Foundation received a total of $5 million in donations from World Wrestling Entertainment owner Vince McMahon and his wife Linda McMahon from 2007 to 2009. Trump appeared twice in WrestleMania events, in 2007 and again in 2009. One donation to the foundation was $4 million in 2007; the second was $1 million in 2009. The WWE later told The Huffington Post that "during this period, WWE paid Donald Trump appearance fees separately", and "separately, [WWE chief executives] Vince and Linda McMahon made personal donations to Donald Trump's foundation".

In 2007, the Celebrity Fight Night Foundation hosted a fundraiser to benefit the Muhammad Ali Parkinson's Center in Phoenix, Arizona. According to a Celebrity Fight Night Foundation spokesperson, in return for Trump's appearance and his offering a New York–based dinner with himself at auction, Trump stipulated that the Parkinson's charity share the total auction proceeds with the Trump Foundation. The Trump Foundation subsequently received $150,000 of auction proceeds that would otherwise have gone to the center benefitting Parkinson's disease research.

Other donations made to the Trump Foundation that may have been in return for Trump's personal work include:

- $400,000 from Comedy Central as payment for Trump's attendance at a celebrity roast in his honor.
- $150,000 from People Magazine in return for exclusive photos of Trump's son, Barron Trump.
- $500,000 from NBC Universal in 2012 while the network was airing Trump's show, The Apprentice.
- $100,000 from the family of Donna Clancy, whose family law office had been renting space at the Trump Organization's 40 Wall Street building.
- $100,000 in 2005 for work by Trump's wife Melania for Norwegian Cruise Lines for a segment that was later included in Trump's show, The Apprentice. A spokeswoman for the company confirmed that the appearance fee to Melania was paid in the form of a donation to the Trump Foundation.

=== Granting money to charities that rented Trump Organization facilities ===
Trump has been accused of directing foundation money toward several charities that in turn paid the Trump Organization to host charity events at Trump-owned hotels and golf clubs. High-profile charity events at Mar-a-Lago cost as much as $300,000.

Some examples:

- In 2010, Trump was personally honored for his support by the Palm Beach Police Foundation after the Trump Foundation donated to the charity $150,000 during the period of 2009–2010. According to the police foundation's public tax records, Palm Beach Police Foundation paid the Trump Organization $276,463 in rent in 2014 for its "Police Ball and Auction" which was held at Trump's Mar-a-Lago hotel. The 2014 tax form also lists $44,332 in unattributed "direct expenses" paid by the police foundation for the same event as well as $36,608 in "direct expenses" for its annual "Golf Classic", which the police foundation holds annually at a Trump Organization-owned golf course. For each of the four years prior to 2014, the police foundation's public tax records show significant "direct expenses" incurred for both the tournament and the Ball and Auction, although expense categories are not cited in the filings.
- In 2013, according to The Washington Post, Trump donated $10,000 to the V Foundation, a cancer-fighting group founded by former basketball coach Jim Valvano, in return for the V Foundation holding a fundraiser at his Trump Winery in Virginia.
- The Dana–Farber Cancer Institute paid the Trump Organization substantial fees to hold annual events at Mar-A-Lago. The Trump Foundation in turn granted to the Institute a total of $85,000 for 2006 and 2007, among other grants in subsequent years.

=== Trump taking personal credit for donations made using foundation money ===
Both The Washington Post and Fox News reported that Trump repeatedly claimed in public, beginning in 2015, to have made over "$102 million" in charitable donations "in the past five years". The Trump Organization provided journalists with a 93-page list of the donations. None of the cash donations were confirmed to come from Trump himself; many were actually grants from the Trump Foundation.

For example, Trump took personal credit and was honored for a Trump Foundation grant to the Palm Beach Police Foundation that was actually from an outside source (see above). He had pledged the money personally, and then the Trump Foundation solicited the $150,000 earmarked for the police foundation from an unrelated philanthropic organization, the Charles Evans Foundation. The Trump Foundation then paid the Palm Beach charity. The police then honored Trump personally with its annual Palm Tree Award at Trump's Mar-a-Lago hotel at its annual fundraiser. The Washington Post wrote that "Trump had effectively turned the Evans Foundation's gifts into his gifts, without adding any money of his own."

The Dana–Farber Cancer Institute has honored Trump variously as "Grand Benefactor" and "Grand Honorary Chair" at its annual fundraisers held at Trump's Mar-a-Lago estate. Trump may have also earned more money on the event fees it received from the institute than the Trump Foundation paid to the institute in grants. Trump has directed at least $300,000 of grants of the Trump Foundation money to Dana-Farber since 2010.

Trump received highly visible praise for his generosity on his prime-time television show The Apprentice. He frequently offered to make generous donations to his contestants' charities, but records show that he ultimately either directed the Trump Foundation to make a grant or had the show's network, NBC Universal, make the donation. Examples include:

- A 2008 episode where Trump told contestant and mixed-martial arts star Tito Ortiz: "I think you're so incredible that—personally, out of my account—I'm going to give you $50,000 for St. Jude's [children's hospital]," Ortiz's chosen charity and also a favorite named charity of Trump's son, Eric. Trump then had the Trump Foundation make a $50,000 grant to St. Jude Children's Hospital.
- In 2012 Trump promised at least six personal donations of $10,000 each to contestants' chosen charities during one episode of Celebrity Apprentice. In another episode of the same season, he pledged $10,000 to contestant Aubrey O'Day's chosen charity, a gift "that moved [contestant and comedienne Lisa] Lampanelli to tears." According to The Washington Post's review of tax filings, Trump directed all this money to be granted to the charities out of Trump Foundation funds.
- In 2013 Trump promised personal donations of $20,000 each to the charities of basketball star Dennis Rodman, singer La Toya Jackson, former Playboy Playmate Brande Roderick, and actor Gary Busey during episodes of The Celebrity Apprentice. Trump then used Trump Foundation money to make the payments. "Remember, Donald Trump is a very nice person, okay?" he told them. According to a Washington Post reporter, who reviewed transcripts of the show, by 2013 "contestants had come to expect these gifts—and even to demand them when Trump didn't offer money on his own".
- A gift to Starkey Hearing Foundation, a charity chosen by an actress Marlee Matlin. Trump was credited with a personal donation of at least $14,000, but the donation came from the Trump Foundation.

Other alleged examples include:

- Trump using foundation money to pay the personal bills of a viewer of the TV show Extra. In 2009 he appeared on the show and promised he would pay a struggling viewer's domestic bills. "This is a bad time for a lot of people", Trump said as the contest was announced. Trump eventually paid the winner with Trump Foundation money. A Trump representative later explained that the grant was legal because the winner qualified as an "indigent" individual under Internal Revenue Code section 4945(d)(3), a contention at least one tax expert has disputed.
- Trump being honored with a chair and plaque in his name at the Raymond F. Kravis Center for the Performing Arts after the Trump Foundation granted it $10,000.
- Trump taking personal credit for a $25,000 grant from the Trump Foundation at a speech honoring slain journalist James Foley in 2014. At the time, the New Hampshire Union Leader published an article titled "Trump leads tribute for slain journalist James Foley". Foley was posthumously awarded the 12th annual Nackey S. Loeb First Amendment Award, "given annually to New Hampshire organizations or residents who protect or exemplify the liberties listed in the First Amendment to the Constitution". Trump was the "featured speaker of the event".
- Trump receiving personal praise for a $100,000 Trump Foundation grant in 2016 to the National September 11 Memorial Museum ahead of the 2016 New York State Republican Primary (above).

=== Making grants to other private foundations without fulfilling IRS "expenditure responsibility" rules ===
The Trump Foundation is responsible by law for ensuring that any grant it makes to another private foundation is used strictly for charitable purposes. To fulfill this IRS "expenditure responsibility" the foundation is required to attach "full and detailed" reports describing the use of the grant money to its IRS 990 tax return for each year a grant to a private foundation is made. Trump Foundation tax returns show that it failed to do this for all twenty of the grants it made to private foundations during the period of 2005 through 2014. Such grants in this period, which total at least $488,500, could have been subject to significant fines and penalties.

=== Receiving donation from Ukrainian oligarch during campaign for president ===
In 2015, Ukrainian Victor Pinchuk made a $150,000 donation to the Trump Foundation in return for Trump's appearance by video conference link at the Yalta European Strategy Conference. The appearance was broadcast on a large screen and lasted only twenty minutes, including delays caused by translation and by technical difficulties. Pinchuk is the son-in-law of former Ukrainian president Lionid Kuchma. In 2018 The New York Times reported that the office of Special Counsel Robert Mueller was investigating the donation as a possible illegal in-kind campaign contribution from a foreign national intended to curry favor with then-candidate Trump.

== Legal actions and closure ==
=== Intended dissolution of the Trump Foundation ===
In September and October 2016 there were several legal actions and complaints filed against the Trump Foundation. The former head of the Internal Revenue Service's Office of Exempt Organizations Division Marc Owens told The Washington Post regarding the various allegations against the foundation: "This is so bizarre, this laundry list of issues ... It's the first time I've ever seen this, and I've been doing this for 25 years in the IRS, and 40 years total."

In late December 2016, one month before his inauguration, Trump announced that he would dissolve the Trump Foundation to avoid "even the appearance of any conflict with [his] role as President". However, a spokesperson from the New York State attorney general's office told The New York Times, the same month, that the foundation "cannot legally dissolve" until its current investigation is completed.

=== Investigation by New York State attorney general's office ===
==== Initial investigations, failure to register as a New York State charity, and notice of violation ====
On September 13, 2016, New York State attorney general Eric Schneiderman announced that his office was investigating the foundation "to make sure it's complying with the laws governing charities in New York." The office had previously filed charges—at that time awaiting trial—against the Trump Organization's Trump University. Jason Miller, a Trump campaign spokesman, responded to the announcement by labeling Schneiderman a "partisan hack". Schneiderman has endorsed Hillary Clinton and was identified as a member of her "New York leadership council" in October 2015.

On September 30, 2016, the attorney general's office issued a Notice of Violation to the Trump Foundation, ordering it to immediately stop all fundraising in New York and to file its registration and all required past audits within 15 days, or risk being "deemed to be a continuing fraud on the people of the State of New York". Under the law, the foundation may eventually be required to return all donations it had solicited since inception. The notice said the foundation has not complied with New York law because it had failed to re-register in New York State as a "7A level charitable organization", as required for charities that solicit $25,000 or more a year from outside donors. The Trump Foundation had been registered in New York under the state's Estates, Powers and Trusts Law with a designation intended for self-funded private foundations.

On October 17 a spokesperson for the attorney general's office confirmed that the Trump Foundation had agreed to cease solicitation of donations in New York State. The Trump Foundation was at the time granted an extension of time for filing its financial paperwork, including all past audits. The attorney general's office said the Trump Foundation also agreed to cooperate with their ongoing investigation. The attorney general's press secretary said Trump could not legally dissolve his foundation until the investigation is finished.

==== Admission of self-dealing ====
In 2016, while under investigation by the New York State Attorney General's office), the Trump Foundation admitted on its IRS Form 990 for 2015 that it had, in previous years, engaged in self-dealing and had transferred "income or assets to disqualified persons" (which could be a Trump family member, a Trump-owned business, or Donald Trump himself). The foundation did not provide specifics. Under tax law, the violations can lead to penalties, such as the imposition of excise taxes or repayment of the improperly spent monies.

==== New York State litigation against Trump Foundation and Trump family ====
People v. Trump
- Court: New York Supreme Court, County of New York
- Full case name: People of the State of New York, by Barbara D. Underwood, Attorney General of the State of New York v. Donald J. Trump, Donald J. Trump Jr., Ivanka Trump, Eric F. Trump, and The Donald J. Trump Foundation

Court membership
- Judge sitting: Justice Saliann Scarpulla

On June 14, 2018, the new New York attorney general Barbara Underwood filed a civil suit against the foundation, Trump himself, and Trump's adult children—Ivanka, Eric and Donald Jr.—alleging they had engaged in "extensive unlawful political conduct" and that Donald Trump had been using the foundation "as his personal checkbook" to, among other things, settle his personal legal debts and support his presidential campaign. The suit sought $2.8 million in restitution and the dissolution of the foundation. The suit noted that Trump himself made all decisions about disbursement of foundation funds and that the board of directors had not met for 18 years. Underwood's office also referred suspected Federal campaign and tax law violations to the Federal Election Commission and to the IRS.

On August 30, 2018, Trump attorney Alan Futerfas filed a motion to dismiss Underwood's suit, claiming it was without merit and was a result of "pervasive bias" by former New York attorney general Eric Schneiderman, who had supervised the investigation before resigning that May. On October 4, 2018, Attorney General Underwood filed a memorandum opposing the motion, instead of strengthening the charges against the Trump Foundation and now alleging, among other claims, that the full $2.8 million of distributions resulting from the January 2016 Iowa fundraiser represented illegal campaign contributions that needed to be repaid. The memorandum also stated that the foundation had engaged in "persistent illegality", adding "Trump used his control over the ... Foundation for his benefit to advance his personal, business, and political interests in violation of federal and state law governing charities."

On October 25, 2018, Justice Saliann Scarpulla heard a hearing on the motion. Justice Scarpulla suggested that she would wait to issue a ruling on the motion until the New York Supreme Court, Appellate Division issued a decision in a separate case (a defamation suit brought by Summer Zervos against Trump) on the issue of whether a sitting U.S. president may be sued in state court at all. On November 23, 2018, Scarpulla denied Trump's motion to dismiss, affirming that a sitting U.S. president can face "a civil lawsuit in state court for actions not taken in his official capacity" and citing the U.S. Supreme Court's decision in Clinton v. Jones (1997).

On November 7, 2019, Scarpulla ordered Trump to pay a $2 million settlement for misusing the foundation for his business and political purposes, directing the settlement money to be given to a handful of charities. The foundation characterized the payment to the charities as a "contribution," stating it was "pleased to donate an additional $2 million" to "worthy organizations." The attorney general had asked the court for an order dissolving the charity and imposing $2.8 million in restitution and penalties. She had also made referrals to the Federal Election Commission (FEC) and the Internal Revenue Service (IRS). On June 18, New York governor Andrew Cuomo's office announced that the governor would refer the civil case to New York's Department of Taxation and Finance if it is requested to do so by the attorney general's office. Given the violations alleged in the civil case, some experts believe a tax investigation could lead to state criminal charges.

==== Dissolution of foundation and final settlement ====
On December 18, 2018, Underwood announced that the foundation had agreed to shut down under court supervision and distribute its remaining assets to court-approved charities, although the attorney general's office would continue its investigations of and legal actions against the foundation and its directors.

The office of the New York State Attorney General announced on November 7th, 2019, the final dissolution of the Foundation. On December 19, 2019, it further announced that was ordered to pay $250,000 to each of eight charitible organizations:

- Army Emergency Relief,
- The Children’s Aid Society
- Citymeals-on-Wheels
- Give an Hour
- Martha's Table
- The United Negro College Fund
- United Way of National Capital Area
- U.S. Holocaust Memorial Museum

Additionally, Trump was ordered to reimburse the Foundation and then to distribute the remaining almost $1.8 million in funds:

Trump was forced to reimburse his namesake foundation $11,525 for sports paraphernalia and champagne purchased at a charity gala, which was added to $1,797,598.30 already in the foundation’s bank account. The combined $1,809,123.30 was split evenly and recently transferred to the eight agreed upon charities. Each charity ended up receiving a total of $476,140.41

Further, Trump was forced to make 19 admissions acknowledging his personal misuse of Foundation funds while both he and his family agreed to mandatory training requirements.

=== Investigation by New York State Department of Taxation and Finance ===
Separately, in July 2018, the case was referred to the New York State Department of Taxation and Finance. In August 2018, the department issued a subpoena to Michael Cohen, formerly Trump's personal attorney, in connection with the case. No additional public charges were brought by the department.

=== Office of the Special Counsel investigation ===
On April 9, 2018, The New York Times reported that the office of Special Counsel Robert Mueller, as part of its larger investigation into Russian interference into the 2016 election, was investigating the Trump Foundation's donation of $150,000 by Ukrainian billionaire Victor Pinchuk in 2015. The Times reported that Trump's personal attorney, Michael Cohen, had solicited the donation from Pinchuk in return for Trump's appearance in a 20-minute video conference with Pinchuk and others in Kyiv in September 2015, just a few months after Trump launched his presidential campaign. The investigation was part of a broader investigation into foreign influence into the campaign. Federal election law prohibits non-U.S. nationals from contributing to U.S. political campaigns.

=== US House Judiciary Committee investigations ===
On September 13, 2016, all fifteen Democrats on the House Judiciary Committee, then in the minority, sent a letter to Attorney General Loretta Lynch requesting that the Justice Department launch a criminal investigation of Trump in connection with his foundation's $25,000 grant to Pam Bondi's campaign. The letter specifically cited possible violations of two anti-bribery laws.

On March 4, 2019, new House Judiciary Committee Chairman Jerrold Nadler issued a subpoena to the Trump Foundation for copies of a broad range of documents it had previously delivered to Robert Mueller's office or any other domestic law enforcement agency on or after November 8, 2016, the day of Trump's election. The request specifically focused on domestic emoluments and contact with Russia-related entities or people.

=== Other complaints ===
Also on September 13, 2016, Citizens for Responsibility and Ethics in Washington (CREW), a left-leaning watchdog group, filed a complaint with the Internal Revenue Service citing evidence they argued would compel the agency to seek back taxes and penalties and revoke the foundation's tax-free status.

== See also ==
- Eric Trump Foundation
- List of grants made by the Donald J. Trump Foundation
- Slush fund
