= List of NFL drafts =

The NFL draft, officially known as the "NFL Annual Player Selection Meeting", is an annual event which serves as the league's most common source of player recruitment. The draft order is determined based on the previous season's standings; the teams with the worst win–loss records receive the earliest picks. Teams that qualified for the NFL playoffs select after non-qualifiers, and their order depends on how far they advanced, using their regular season record as a tie-breaker. The final two selections in the first round are reserved for the Super Bowl runner-up and champion. Draft picks are tradable and players or other picks can be acquired with them.

In 1936, the league introduced the NFL draft after team owners voted on it in 1935. The intention of the draft is to make the NFL more competitive, as some teams had an advantage in signing players. From 1947 through 1958 the NFL designated the first overall selection as a "bonus" or "lottery pick". The pick was awarded by a random draw and the winner who received the "bonus pick" forfeited its selection in the final round of the draft and became ineligible for future draws. The system was abolished prior to the 1959 NFL draft, as all twelve teams in the league at the time had received a bonus choice.

== List of drafts by year ==
Draft	Date	Rds.	Picks	Venue	City	First overall pick	Hall of Famers	Ref.
1936	February 8, 1936	9	81	Ritz-Carlton Hotel	Philadelphia	Jay Berwanger	4	
1937	December 12, 1936	10	100	Hotel Lincoln	New York	Sam Francis	2	
1938	December 12, 1937	12	110	Sherman House Hotel	Chicago	Corbett Davis	2	
1939	December 9, 1938	22	200	New Yorker Hotel	New York	Ki Aldrich	1	
1940	December 9, 1939	22	200	Schroeder Hotel	Milwaukee	George Cafego	2	
1941	December 10, 1940	22	204	Willard Hotel	Washington, D.C.	Tom Harmon	1	
1942	December 22, 1941	22	200	Palmer House Hotel	Chicago	Bill Dudley	1	
1943	April 8, 1943	32	300	Palmer House Hotel	Chicago	Frank Sinkwich	0	
1944	April 19, 1944	32	330	Warwick Hotel	Philadelphia	Angelo Bertelli	3	
1945	April 8, 1945	32	330	Commodore Hotel	New York	Charley Trippi	5	
1946	January 14, 1946	32	300	Commodore Hotel	New York	Frank Dancewicz	1	
1947	December 16, 1946	32	300	Commodore Hotel	New York	Bob Fenimore	2	
1948	December 19, 1947	32	300	Fort Pitt Hotel	Pittsburgh	Harry Gilmer	3	
1949	December 21, 1948	25	251	The Bellevue-Stratford Hotel; Schenley Hotel	Philadelphia	Chuck Bednarik	4	
1950	January 20–21, 1950	30	391	Bellevue-Stratford Hotel; Racquet Club of Philadelphia	Philadelphia	Leon Hart	5	
1951	January 18–19, 1951	30	362	Blackstone Hotel	Chicago	Kyle Rote	8	
1952	January 17, 1952	30	360	Hotel Statler	New York	Bill Wade	4	
1953	January 22, 1953	30	360	Bellevue-Stratford Hotel	Philadelphia	Harry Babcock	8	
1954	January 28, 1954	30	360	Bellevue-Stratford Hotel	Philadelphia	Bobby Garrett	1	
1955	January 27–28, 1955	30	360	Bellevue-Stratford Hotel; Warwick Hotel	New York	George Shaw	1	
1956	November 28, 1955, January 17–18, 1956	30	360	Bellevue-Stratford Hotel; Ambassador Hotel	Philadelphia; Los Angeles	Gary Glick	4	
1957	November 26, 1956, January 31, 1957	30	360	Bellevue-Stratford Hotel; Warwick Hotel	Philadelphia	Paul Hornung	9	
1958	December 2, 1957, January 28, 1958	30	360	Warwick Hotel	Philadelphia	King Hill	4	
1959	December 1, 1958, January 21, 1959	30	360	Warwick Hotel	Philadelphia	Randy Duncan	1	
1960	November 30, 1959	20	240	Warwick Hotel	Philadelphia	Billy Cannon	2	
1961	December 27–28, 1960	20	280	Warwick Hotel	Philadelphia	Tommy Mason	7	
1962	December 4, 1961	20	280	Sheraton Hotel & Towers	Chicago	Ernie Davis	2	
1963	December 3, 1962	20	280	Sheraton Hotel & Towers	Chicago	Terry Baker	5	
1964	December 2, 1963	20	280	Sheraton Hotel & Towers	Chicago	Dave Parks	11	
1965	November 28, 1964	20	280	Summit Hotel	New York	Tucker Frederickson	5	
1966	November 27, 1965	20	305	Summit Hotel	New York	Tommy Nobis	1	
1967	March 14–15, 1967	17	445	Gotham Hotel	New York	Bubba Smith	8	
1968	January 30–31, 1968	17	462	Belmont Plaza Hotel	New York	Ron Yary	8	
1969	January 28–29, 1969	17	442	Belmont Plaza Hotel	New York	O. J. Simpson	5	
1970	January 27–28, 1970	17	442	Belmont Plaza Hotel	New York	Terry Bradshaw	2	
1971	January 28–29, 1971	17	442	Belmont Plaza Hotel	New York	Jim Plunkett	4	
1972	February 1–2, 1972	17	442	Essex House	New York	Walt Patulski	1	
1973	January 30–31, 1973	17	442	Americana Hotel	New York	John Matuszak	4	
1974	January 29–30, 1974	17	442	Americana Hotel	New York	Ed "Too Tall" Jones	5	
1975	January 28–29, 1975	17	442	Hilton at Rockefeller Center	New York	Steve Bartkowski	3	
1976	April 8–9, 1976	17	487	Roosevelt Hotel	New York	Lee Roy Selmon	5	
1977	May 3–4, 1977	12	335	Roosevelt Hotel	New York	Ricky Bell	1	
1978	May 2–3, 1978	12	334	Roosevelt Hotel	New York	Earl Campbell	3	
1979	May 3–4, 1979	12	330	Waldorf-Astoria Hotel	New York	Tom Cousineau	3	
1980	April 29–30, 1980	12	333	New York Sheraton Hotel	New York	Billy Sims	3	
1981	April 28–29, 1981	12	332	New York Sheraton Hotel	New York	George Rogers	6	
1982	April 27–28, 1982	12	334	New York Sheraton Hotel	New York	Kenneth Sims	3	
1983	April 26–27, 1983	12	335	New York Sheraton Hotel	New York	John Elway	9	
1984	May 1–2, 1984	12	336	New York Sheraton Hotel	New York	Irving Fryar	0	
1985	April 30 – May 1, 1985	12	336	New York Sheraton Hotel	New York	Bruce Smith	5	
1986	April 29–30, 1986	12	333	New York Marriott Marquis	New York	Bo Jackson	1	
1987	April 28–29, 1987	12	335	New York Marriott Marquis	New York	Vinny Testaverde	1	
1988	April 24–25, 1988	12	333	New York Marriott Marquis	New York	Aundray Bruce	7	
1989	April 23–24, 1989	12	335	New York Marriott Marquis	New York	Troy Aikman	5	
1990	April 22–23, 1990	12	332	New York Marriott Marquis	New York	Jeff George	6	
1991	April 21–22, 1991	12	334	New York Marriott Marquis	New York	Russell Maryland	2	
1992	April 26–27, 1992	12	336	New York Marriott Marquis	New York	Steve Emtman	0	
1993	April 25–26, 1993	8	224	New York Marriott Marquis	New York	Drew Bledsoe	5	
1994	April 24–25, 1994	7	222	New York Marriott Marquis	New York	Dan Wilkinson	6	
1995	April 22–23, 1995	7	249	Theater at Madison Square Garden	New York	Ki-Jana Carter	6	
1996	April 20–21, 1996	7	254	Theater at Madison Square Garden	New York	Keyshawn Johnson	7	
1997	April 19–20, 1997	7	240	Theater at Madison Square Garden	New York	Orlando Pace	5	
1998	April 18–19, 1998	7	241	Theater at Madison Square Garden	New York	Peyton Manning	4	
1999	April 17–18, 1999	7	253	Theater at Madison Square Garden	New York	Tim Couch	2	
2000	April 15–16, 2000	7	254	Theater at Madison Square Garden	New York	Courtney Brown	1	
2001	April 21–22, 2001	7	246	Theater at Madison Square Garden	New York	Michael Vick	4	
2002	April 20–21, 2002	7	261	Theater at Madison Square Garden	New York	David Carr	3	
2003	April 26–27, 2003	7	262	Theater at Madison Square Garden	New York	Carson Palmer	3	
2004	April 24–25, 2004	7	255	Theater at Madison Square Garden	New York	Eli Manning	2	
2005	April 23–24, 2005	7	255	Javits Center	New York	Alex Smith	1	
2006	April 29–30, 2006	7	255	Radio City Music Hall	New York	Mario Williams	1	
2007	April 28–29, 2007	7	255	Radio City Music Hall	New York	JaMarcus Russell	4	
2008	April 26–27, 2008	7	252	Radio City Music Hall	New York	Jake Long	0	
2009	April 25–26, 2009	7	256	Radio City Music Hall	New York	Matthew Stafford	0	
2010	April 22–24, 2010	7	255	Radio City Music Hall	New York	Sam Bradford	0	
2011	April 28–30, 2011	7	254	Radio City Music Hall	New York	Cam Newton	0	
2012	April 26–28, 2012	7	253	Radio City Music Hall	New York	Andrew Luck	1	
2013	April 25–27, 2013	7	254	Radio City Music Hall	New York	Eric Fisher	0	
2014	May 8–10, 2014	7	256	Radio City Music Hall	New York	Jadeveon Clowney	0	
2015	April 30 – May 2, 2015	7	256	Auditorium Theatre; Grant Park	Chicago	Jameis Winston	0	
2016	April 28–30, 2016	7	253	Auditorium Theatre; Grant Park	Chicago	Jared Goff	0	
2017	April 27–29, 2017	7	253	Eakins Oval	Philadelphia	Myles Garrett	0	
2018	April 26–28, 2018	7	256	AT&T Stadium	Arlington	Baker Mayfield	0	
2019	April 25–27, 2019	7	254	Lower Broadway	Nashville	Kyler Murray	0	
2020	April 23–25, 2020	7	255	Virtual (Note: Originally to be held at Caesars Palace in Paradise, Nevada, the NFL canceled all live activities and the draft was replaced by video conference calls from player's homes due to the COVID-19 pandemic.)		Joe Burrow	0	
2021	April 29 – May 1, 2021	7	259	FirstEnergy Stadium	Cleveland	Trevor Lawrence	0	
2022	April 28–30, 2022	7	262	Bellagio	Paradise	Travon Walker	0	
2023	April 27–29, 2023	7	259	Union Station	Kansas City	Bryce Young	0	
2024	April 25–27, 2024	7	257	Hart Plaza; Campus Martius Park	Detroit	Caleb Williams	0	
2025	April 24–26, 2025	7	257	Lambeau Field	Green Bay	Cam Ward	0	
2026	April 23–25, 2026	7	257	Point State Park; Acrisure Stadium	Pittsburgh	Fernando Mendoza		
2027	April 2027	7	TBD	National Mall	Washington, D.C.			
2028	April 2028	7	TBD	Downtown Minneapolis	Minneapolis, MN			

== See also ==
- Drafts in sports
- List of professional American football drafts
- List of NFL draft broadcasters
- List of first overall NFL draft picks
- List of second overall NFL draft picks
- Mr. Irrelevant
