= Philip Birnbaum (architect) =

American architect (1907–1996)

- Born: 1907; Manhattan, New York City, U.S.
- Died: November 27, 1996 (aged 89); Manhattan, New York City, U.S.
- Education: Columbia University
- Occupation: Architect
- Children: Dara Birnbaum
- Practice: Philip Birnbaum & Associates

Philip Birnbaum (1907 – November 27, 1996) was an American architect. The sheer volume of his work was once described as "[exceeding] just about any other architect in recent decades."

== Early life and education ==
Birnbaum was born in the northern part of the borough of Manhattan in New York City in 1907 and grew up in Washington Heights, living in crowded tenements. He attended Stuyvesant High School and graduated in architecture from Columbia University. Although he was accepted into Princeton University, he was told by the institution itself that he might "not fit into the environment" due to his Jewish religion and heritage.

== Career ==
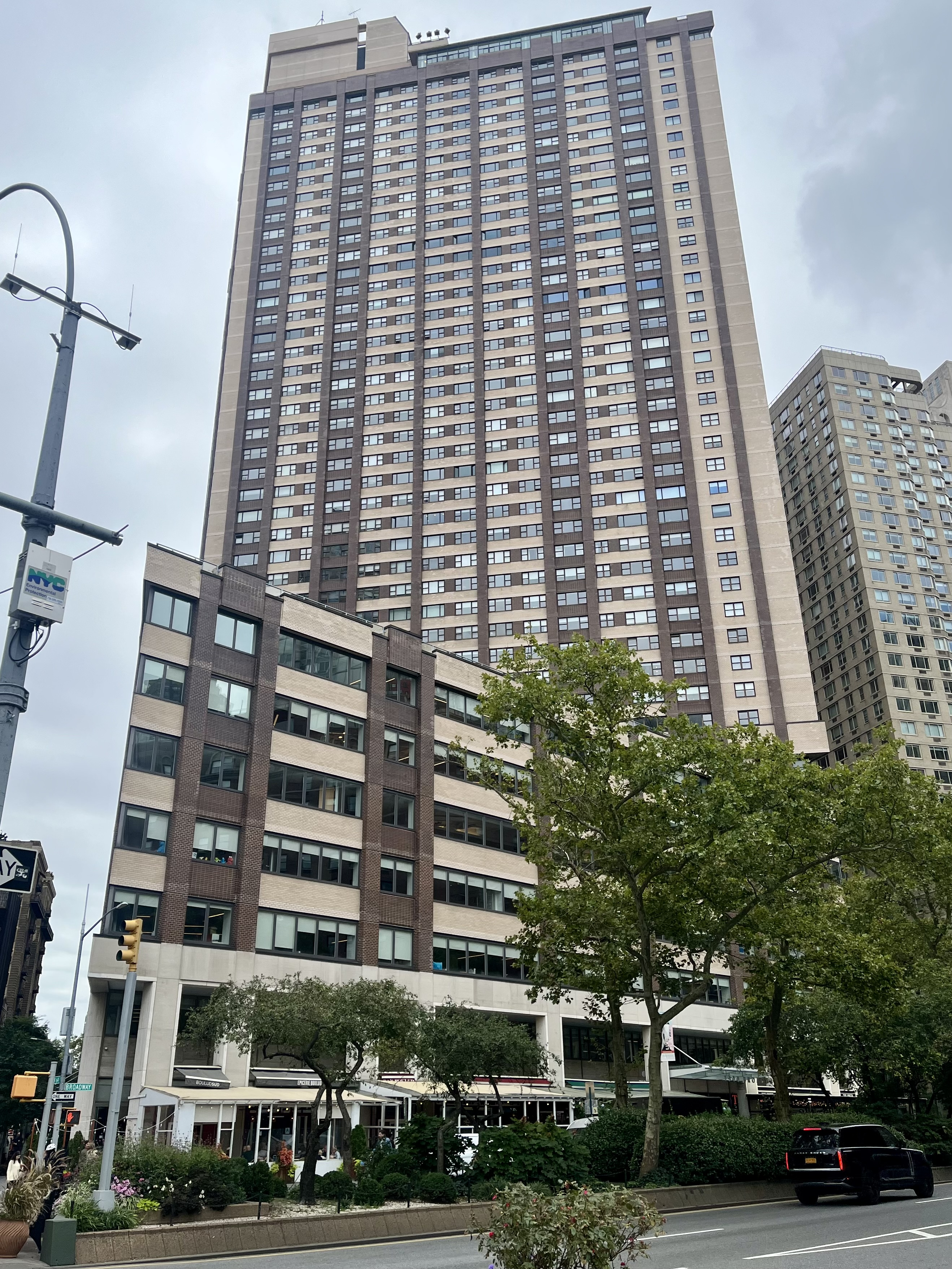
1 Lincoln Plaza

Birnbaum designed about 300 buildings over the course of his career. Most of his major projects were in Manhattan and include 1 Lincoln Plaza, Hotel Parker Meridien, Trump Plaza, and the interior of The Galleria. According to The New York Times, his buildings were notable for "virtually no wasted floor space". Outside of Manhattan, Birnbaum was involved in the design of several buildings in the Forest Hills and Kew Gardens neighborhoods of Queens, many of which were for developer Alfred Kaskel. The Dara Gardens complex in Kew Gardens Hills was named after his daughter Dara. Birnbaum's work for Alfred Kaskel also brought him to South Florida; along with architect Melvin Grossman, he designed the Doral Beach Hotel in Miami Beach. He also worked on the Doral Country Club in Doral.

Birnbaum died in Manhattan on November 27, 1996, at the age of 89.
