= Miami Beach Resort and Spa =

Historic resort hotel in Miami Beach, Florida

Coordinates: 25°49′26″N 80°7′18″W

The Miami Beach Resort and Spa is a historic resort hotel opened in 1963 as the Doral Hotel On-The-Ocean and closed in 2019. It is located on the famous Millionaire's Row at 4833 Collins Avenue in Miami Beach, Florida.

== History ==
Designed by architects Melvin Grossman and Philip Birnbaum and constructed by builder Robert Turchin, the hotel, also known as the Doral Beach Hotel, was named for the owner's wife Doris and the owner Alfred Kaskel. The hotel opened on February 15, 1963, as the sister hotel to the Doral Country Club on the mainland (now known as Trump National Doral in Doral, Florida), where the Doral Open was played until 2006. The Doral Beach Hotel was long considered the most elegant and luxurious hotel in the area. It won several of the coveted Mobil Five Star awards. The hotel hosted the headquarters of George McGovern during the 1972 Democratic National Convention. The Doral was home away from home for movie stars and presidents.

Several scenes from the 1972 film The Heartbreak Kid were shot on location at the hotel. The movie shows the lobby, room #1704, the bar adjacent to the Starlight Roof restaurant on the 18th floor of the hotel, and the pool area and beach. The Switzerland party scene as well as an elevator scene in Iron Man 2 was filmed in the hotel in 2010.

In the 1990s, the hotel changed hands several times. It was purchased from the original family in the early 1990s by OBR, a French company, and renamed the Doral Ocean Beach Resort. OBR company sold the hotel to Interstate Hotels in 1997 and it became a Westin, The Westin Resort Miami Beach. In September 1998, Interstate Hotels was purchased by Wyndham International and the property was renamed the Wyndham Miami Beach Resort. In 2006, the Blackstone Group purchased Wyndham International and the hotel was renamed the Miami Beach Resort and Spa. The Chetrit Group purchased the hotel in 2013 for $117 million. They closed the hotel in 2019 for major renovations that have not begun as of 2025.

== Gallery ==
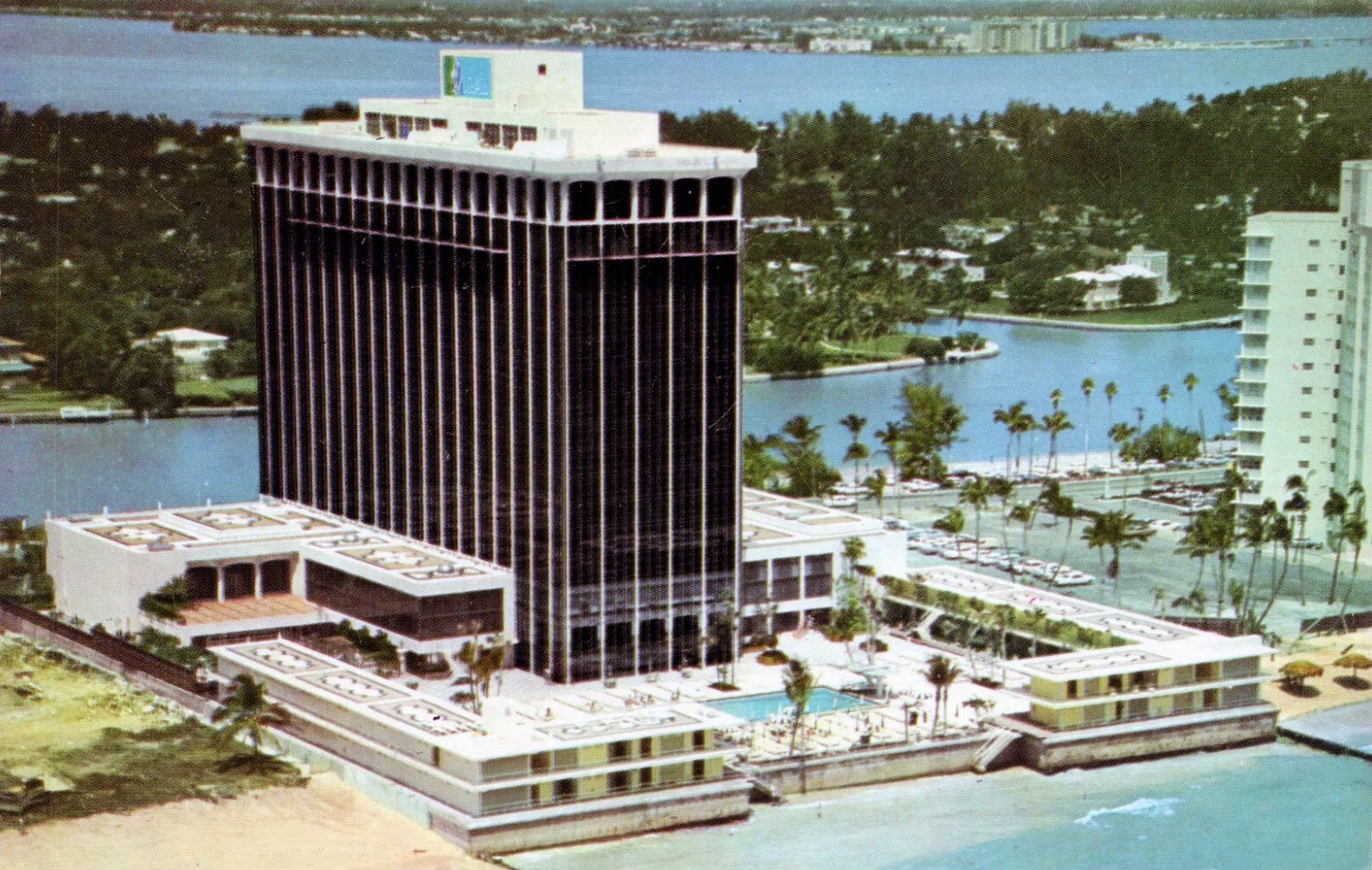
Doral Beach Hotel, 1960s

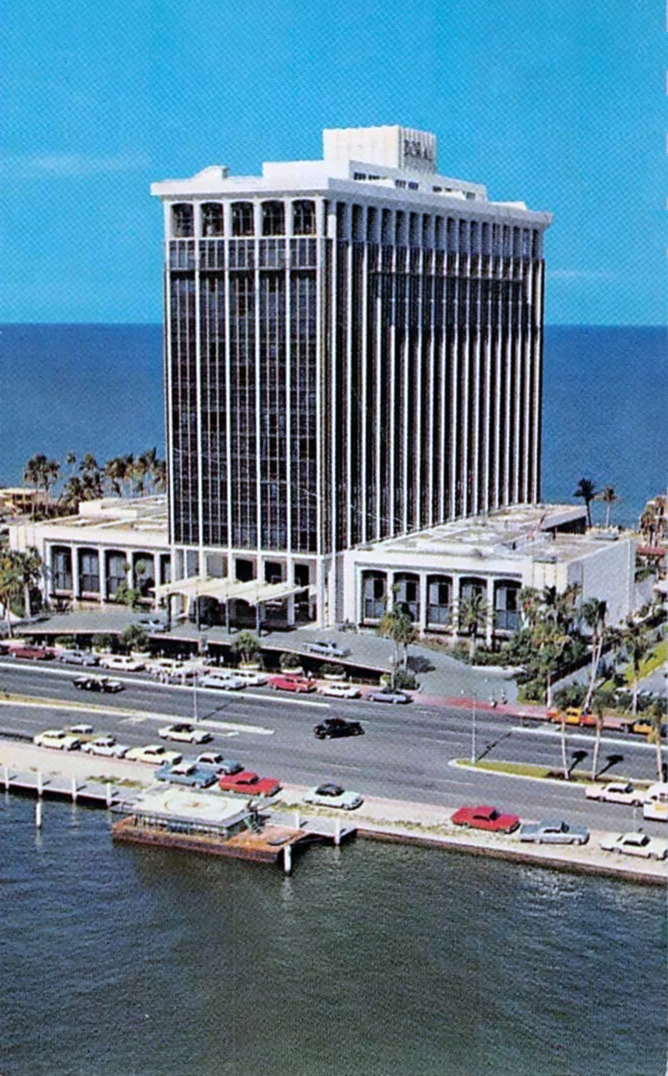
Doral Beach Hotel, 1960s

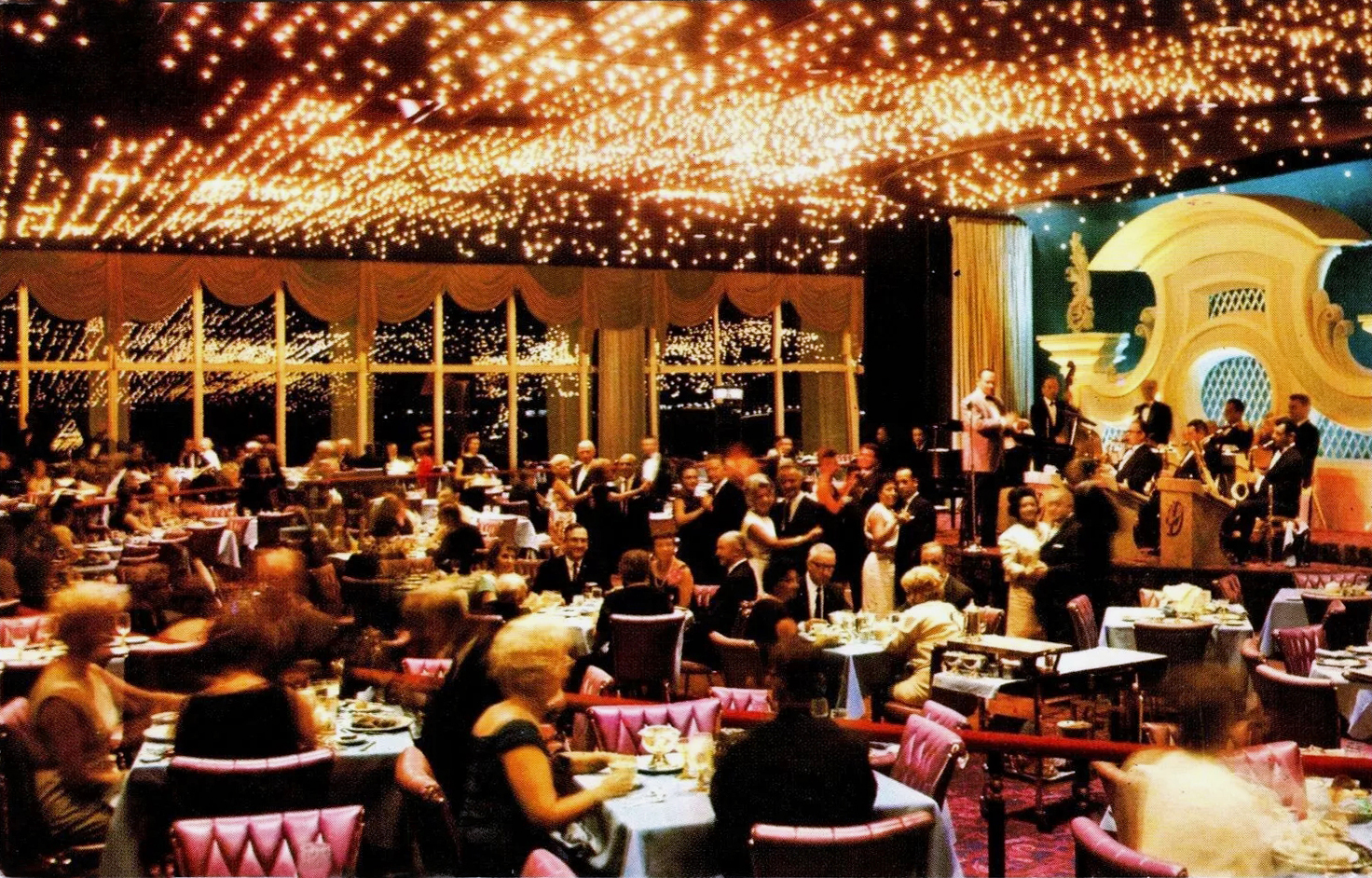
The Starlight Roof, circa 1965

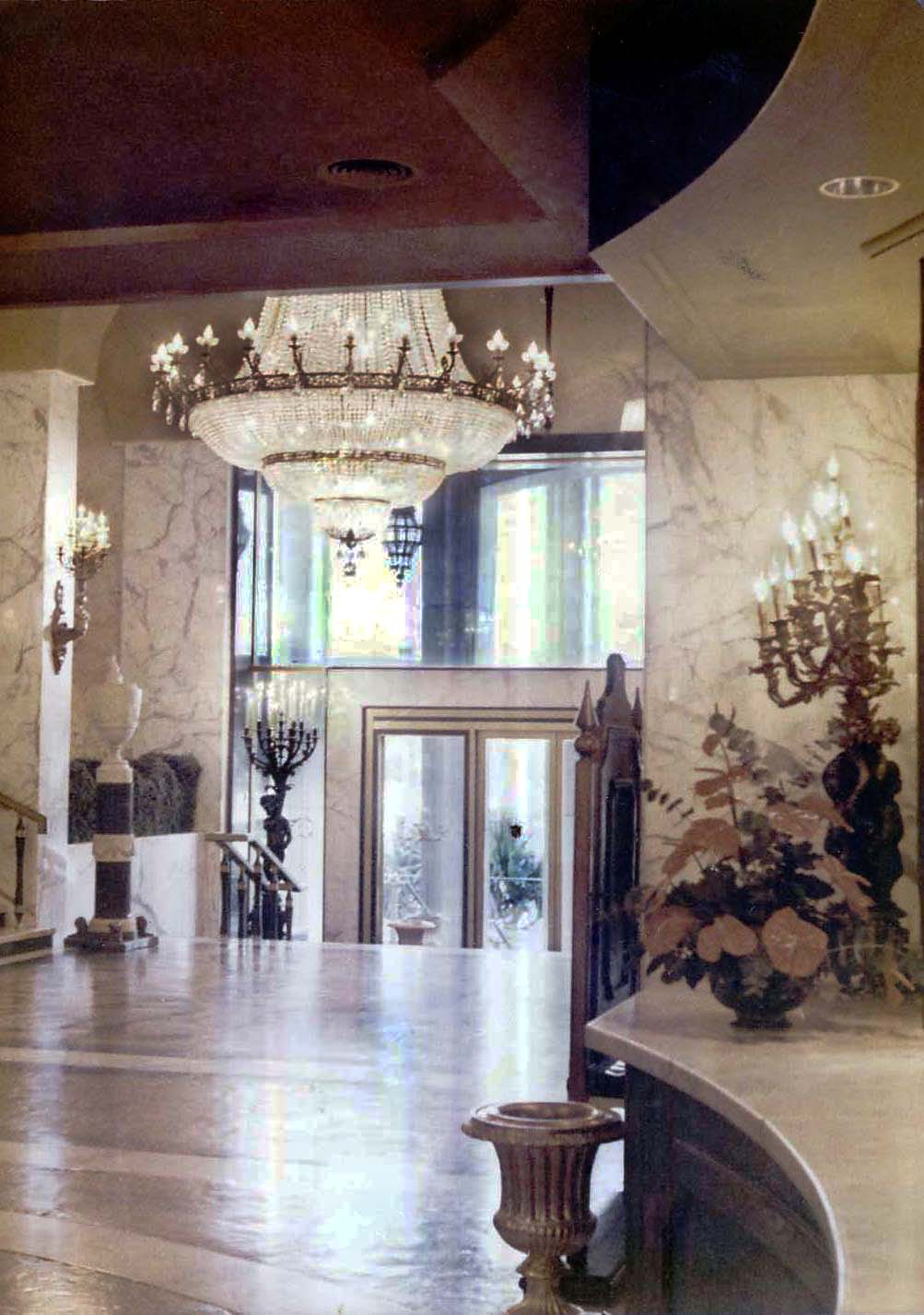
Doral Beach Hotel lobby, 1973
