= Stewart Rahr =

American businessman

Stewart J. Rahr
- Born: 1946 (age 79–80); Queens, New York, US
- Education: New York University
- Occupation: Former pharmaceutical distributor
- Spouse: Carol K. Rahr (m. 1969–2012)
- Children: 2
- Website: The Stewart J. Rahr Foundation

Stewart J. Rahr is an American entrepreneur, investor and philanthropist. Rahr was the founder and owner of pharmaceutical and generics wholesaler Kinray, the largest privately owned pharmaceutical distributor in the world until it was bought out by Cardinal Health in 2010. The sale made Rahr a billionaire.

== Early life and career ==
Stewart Rahr was raised in a Jewish family in Far Rockaway section of Queens, New York. As a youth, he worked at his father's retail pharmacy store in Brooklyn. In 1963, he graduated from Poly Prep Country Day School in Brooklyn. He graduated with a B.A. from New York University and attended New York University Law School before dropping out to take over his family's pharmacy business, which then had $50,000 in sales.

The business also served as a wholesaler for other pharmacies and Rahr focused on the wholesale side of the business. He expanded the business into a large operation named Kinray Inc. By 2010, Kinray served over 2,000 pharmacies in the Northeastern United States with revenues of over $5 billion. Rahr was able to grow the business through the stockpiling of pharmaceuticals and relied on drug price inflation to maximize his profit margin when he sold the extra inventory to retail pharmacies at a later date. This practice later became controversial due to consumer ethics issues. Pharmaceutical manufacturers now monitor their distributors to ensure that they do not hold more than one month's supply of any given drug. In 2010, Rahr sold Kinray to Cardinal Health for $1.3 billion. The sale made Rahr a "self-made billionaire".

In 2020, Rahr ranked No. 359 on the Forbes 400 list of the richest people in America.

== Philanthropy ==
In 2012, Rahr donated $640,000 to the Israel Cancer Research Fund, a source of private funds for cancer research in Israel. In late 2012, Rahr donated $100,000 to the Salvation Army for Hurricane Sandy relief efforts. He also donated $50,000 to help repair the Russian American Jewish Experience (RAJE) in Brighton Beach, which was also severely damaged by Hurricane Sandy.

In 2013, Rahr was named the largest individual donor to the Metro New York chapter of the Make-A-Wish Foundation. In 2013, Rahr donated $10 million to the Make-A-Wish Foundation, the largest contribution in its history.

In January 2014, Rahr sponsored the flight of 64 members of the Knesset to the memorial service at Auschwitz for Holocaust Remembrance Day. In February 2014, on a visit to Israel, Rahr donated money to provide new ambulances to United Hatzalah, an organization dedicated to improving response time to those in medical need throughout Israel. Also in 2014, Rahr made a $500,000 donation to the North Shore Animal League America.

== Political activity ==
Rahr contributed $250,000 to Donald Trump's 2020 presidential campaign.

== Personal life ==
In 1969, he married Carol K. Rahr. They had two children, Robert and Felicia. In 2012, they announced that they were divorcing. In 2013, Rahr agreed to pay Carol $250 million as a settlement.

In November 2012, Rahr was banned from the restaurant Nobu in New York. Rahr has an apartment in the Trump Park Avenue building. In 2005, Rahr purchased a house in The Hamptons for $45 million. He sold an apartment at on 72nd Street in 2013.

In February 2019, Rahr was identified as the purchaser of a portrait of President Trump. According to testimony from Michael Cohen, Rahr bought a nine-foot-tall portrait of Trump from artist William Quigley for $67,000. Trump used funds from his personal foundation to pay back Rahr for the portrait.

In March 2021, he sold his 18,000-square-foot home called Burn Point on Georgica Pond in Wainscott, New York for $49.7 million. He bought the house in 2004.
