= Trump Plaza (New York City) =

Residential skyscraper in Manhattan, New York

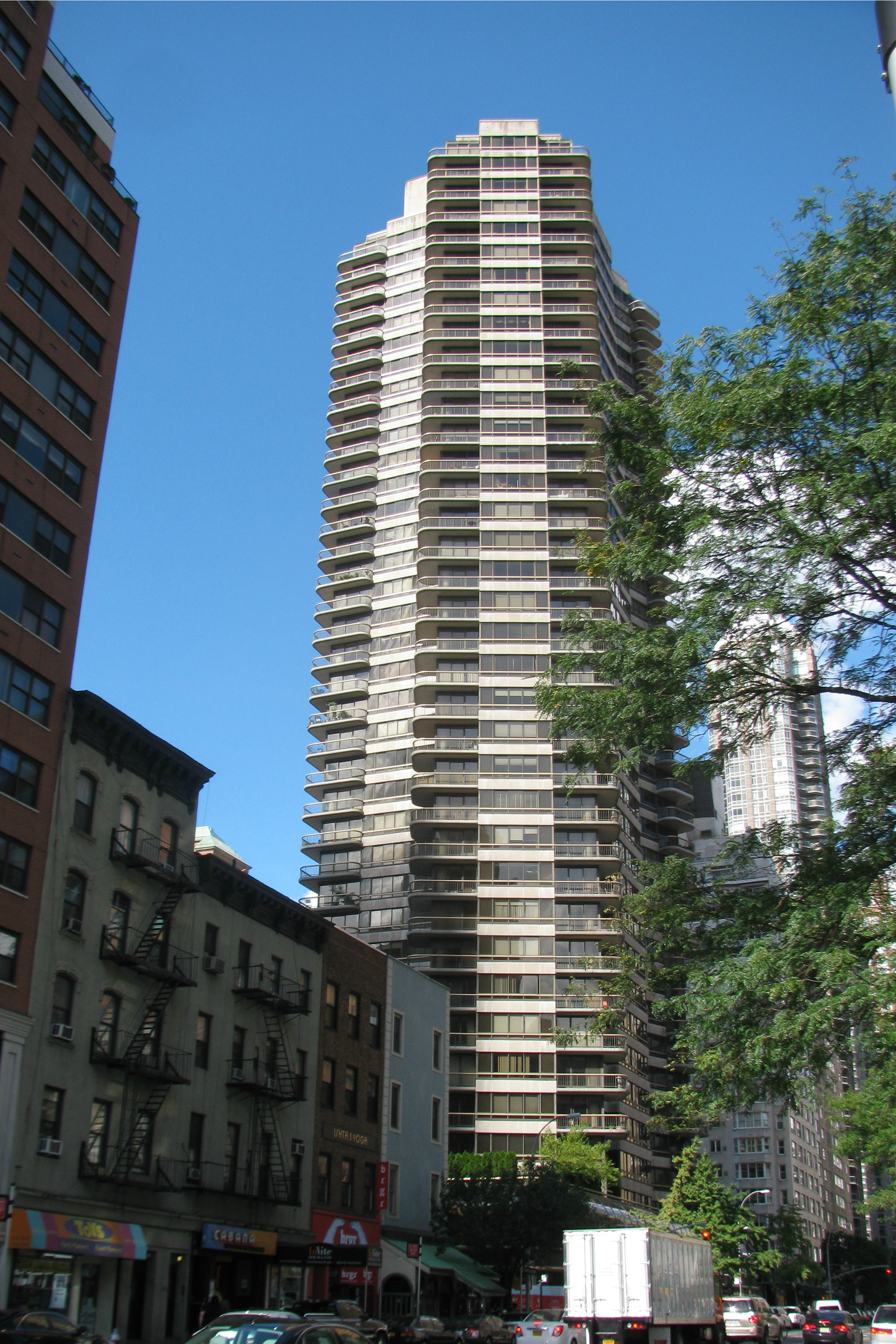
- Trump Plaza in 2012

General information
- Status: Completed
- Type: Cooperative apartments and retail
- Location: 167 East 61st Street, Upper East Side, Manhattan, New York City, United States
- Coordinates: 40.763298°N 73.965703°W
- Named for: Donald Trump
- Construction started: 1982
- Opened: March 1984
- Renovated: 2016
- Cost: $125 million

Height
- Height: 366 feet (111.6 m)

Technical details
- Floor count: 36

Design and construction
- Architect: Philip Birnbaum
- Structural engineer: Rosenwasser / Grossman Consulting Engineers, P.C.

Other information
- Number of units: 154

Trump Plaza is a 36-story cooperative apartment and retail building at 167 East 61st Street on the Upper East Side of Manhattan, New York City. The property, designed by Philip Birnbaum and named after Donald Trump, opened in 1984 at a cost of $125 million.

== History ==
=== Construction ===
Construction of Trump Plaza began in 1982, at the intersection of East 61st Street and Third Avenue. Donald Trump negotiated a 40-year deal with the owner of the land in which the building would pay an annual rent of approximately $1.2 million until 2023. Trump chose to name the project Trump Plaza to capitalize on the marketing success of his nearby Trump Tower. The project, initially expected to cost $50 million, was to contain 180 cooperative apartment units, located above 12,000 sq ft (1,100 m^{2}) of retail space that would be situated on the ground floor.

Two project offices on East 61st Street, made of brownstone, were to be converted into apartments after the main structure was completed. Trump said that despite the popularity of condominiums in New York at that time, "I wanted to buck the trend. There are a lot of people who want to live in a cooperative. […] Many people find a co-op's exclusivity, the unity it gives a building, comforting. This exclusivity can be used negatively, but it has positive aspects as well." Units would range from 1,200 sq ft (110 m^{2}) to 1,900 sq ft (180 m^{2}), with prices between $285,000 and $1 million.

Sales began in April 1983, with initial prices starting at $450 per square foot. In May 1983, a construction worker died after falling 33 stories while working on the project. By July 1983, starting prices for apartment units in the project had increased six times, ultimately reaching up to $1,200 per square foot; 50 percent of the apartments had been leased up to that point. The building cost $125 million to construct.

The concrete and concrete workers union labor for the building was supplied by mobster Anthony "Fat Tony" Salerno. Salerno and Trump were linked through Roy Cohn, who represented both of them. In 1986 Rudy Giuliani and the SDNY indicted Salerno on racketeering linked to the bid rigging of concrete and construction on Trump Plaza, as well as other buildings built in the era.

=== Opening and operation ===
Trump Plaza was opened in March 1984, with 145 units. Notable residents included former Kentucky governor John Y. Brown Jr. and his wife Phyllis George, as well as Dick Clark and Martina Navratilova. At the time of opening, Trump owned 90 percent of the building partnership. An Italian restaurant named Alo Alo, owned by film producer Dino De Laurentiis and Brazilian business partner Ricardo Amaral, opened inside the building in 1985. By 1989, the restaurant had been sold. Apartment owners, under the name of Trump Plaza Owners Inc., sued Trump in February 1990, claiming the building contained various defects. The suit sought for Trump to pay $10.7 million and to have his name removed from the building. By 1999, Trump still owned a few apartment units, as well as retail space and the property's parking garage.

In 2004, Select Comfort signed a 10-year lease to operate a 2,400 sq ft (220 m^{2}) furniture store inside the building, replacing a restaurant known as Commissary. In 2007, western retailer Billy Martin's USA opened a new 1,000 sq ft (93 m^{2}) store inside Trump Plaza. In 2012, the 2,450 sq ft (228 m^{2}) Lobel's Kitchen opened inside the building. By April 2014, the Lobel's Kitchen space was for lease at a cost of $600,000 per year. Within two months, American Apparel planned to open a store in the former Lobel's space. As of 2015, the property is operated by Douglas Elliman Property Management. In 2016, to remain competitive with newer residential projects, Trump Plaza's basement gym facility was converted into a children's playroom, while the gym was relocated to a space on the first and second floor that was previously used as an apartment by the building superintendent.

== Architecture ==
Trump Plaza was designed by Philip Birnbaum and was built out in a Y-shape. The structure is made of limestone, glass, and metal, and includes five apartments on each floor, while the building includes a total of 340,000 sq ft (32,000 m^{2}). Trump, who sometimes exaggerated the number of floors in his buildings, stated that Trump Plaza was 39 stories high while it is actually 36 stories.

Birnbaum was subsequently hired to design a nearby high-rise condominium known as the Savoy, diagonally opposite Trump Plaza. Birnbaum gave the Savoy a similar design to Trump Plaza, as he envisioned the buildings as the gateway to upper Third Avenue. In April 1984, Trump sued Birnbaum and Morton Olshan, the owner of the Savoy, for $60 million for allegedly copying Trump Plaza's design. A settlement was reached in October 1984, after Olshan agreed to have his building redesigned mid-construction.

== Reception ==
Although Birnbaum was known for simple building designs in New York City, architectural critic Paul Goldberger stated that Trump Plaza "looks as if it might be the finest building in Caracas – all of this sleekness is chic in a particularly Latin way, quite uncharacteristic of New York, despite the lavish use of limestone." Goldberger also stated that no one "could possibly mistake it for yet another Third Avenue high-rise." Goldberger later called it "a better and more striking building than the typical Third Avenue brick box, but it is nothing if not showy."

In 2016, Steve Cuozzo of the New York Post stated that the area around Trump Plaza had been "a lost highway of tenements and boxy, bland apartment buildings" and that the project "inspired four more similarly configured towers on the avenue and lent some badly needed class to uptown east of Lexington Avenue."
