= Alfred Kaskel =

American real estate developer and hotelier

Alfred L. Kaskel
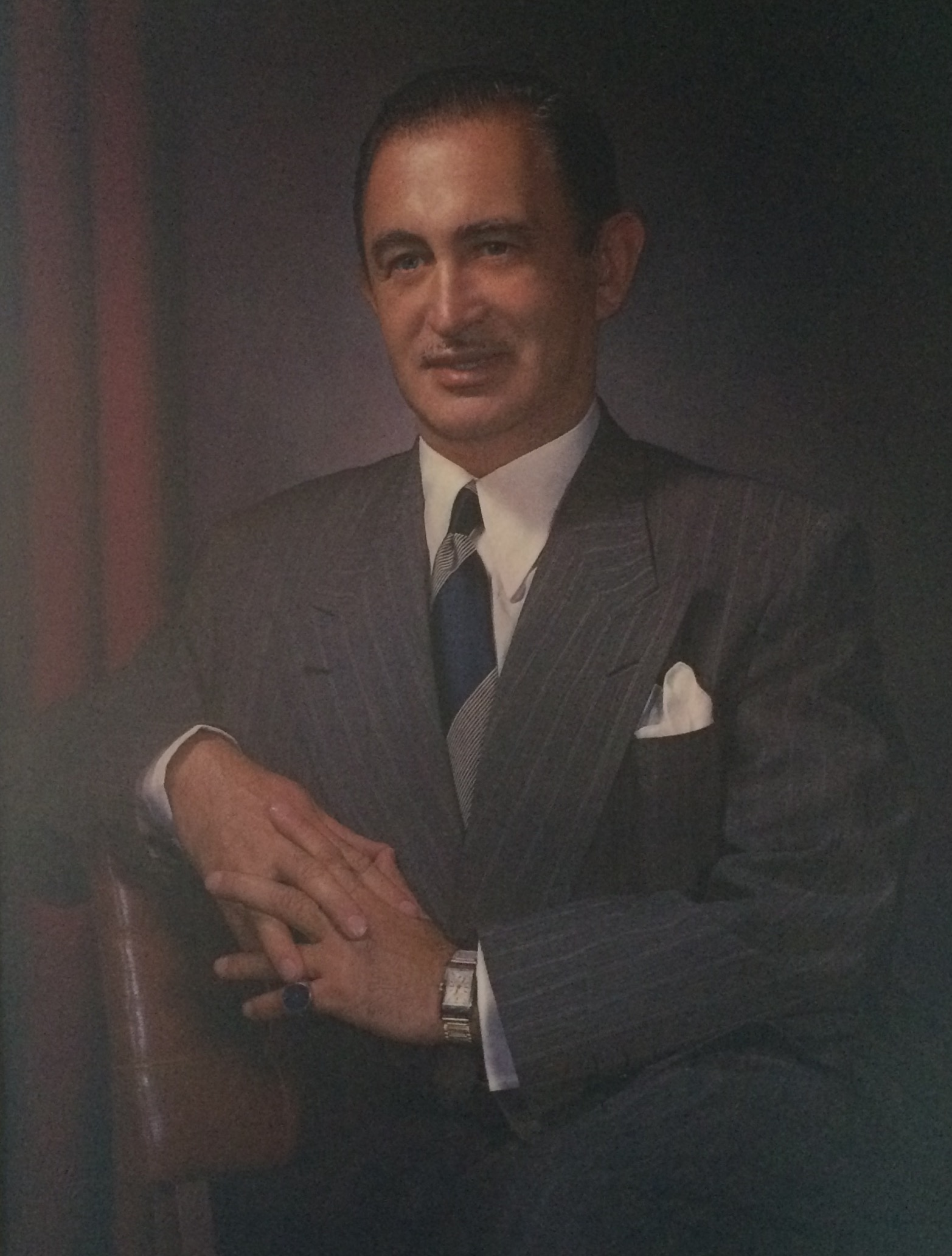
- Born: Alfred L. Kaskel; June 26, 1901; Poland
- Died: July 5, 1968 (aged 67); New York City, US
- Spouse: Doris Bernstein
- Children: 3

Alfred Kaskel (1901–1968) was an American real estate developer and hotelier, best known for founding Doral Hotels and Resorts, Doral Construction, and Carol Management, which developed, owned, and managed a number of hotels, apartment buildings, and office buildings in New York City, Florida, Chicago, and Boston, primarily from the 1930s to the 1990s. This included more than 20,000 rental apartments.

== Biography ==
Kaskel was born to a Jewish family in Poland and immigrated to the US in the 1930s to New York, bringing his siblings with him. Soon after arriving, he began building in New York City where he eventually had over 17,000 apartments constructed, including: Gracie Towers and 360 East 72nd Street in Manhattan; Roosevelt Terrace in Jackson Heights, Queens; Churchill Manor in Briarwood, Queens; Park City and Park City Estates in Rego Park, Queens; Kennedy House in Forest Hills, Queens; and River Terrace and Skyview apartments in Riverdale, Bronx. Kaskel buildings were some of the first in New York City to have sunken living rooms, terraces, and outdoor corridors. Most of his buildings were designed by architect Philip Birnbaum.

Kaskel also developed The Anita Apartments, The Carol Apartments, and The Howard Apartments in Rego Park, Queens, which he named after each of his children. Kaskel's children later reciprocated when they developed The Alfred, a 38-story condominium tower in Manhattan, in his name. In the fall of 1945, Kaskel and his Carol Management Corporation purchased the Belmont Plaza Hotel opposite the Waldorf Astoria New York, and increased the budget of its popular supper club, the Glass Hat Club.

Kaskel was perhaps best known for founding Doral Hotels & Resorts, which developed, owned and operated luxury hotels including the Doral Golf Resort and Spa (now Trump National Doral Miami), Doral Miami Beach, Carillon Miami, Doral Telluride Resort and Spa, Doral Inn, Doral Tuscany, Doral Park Avenue, and Doral Arrowwood, among others.

The city of Doral in Florida is named after the Doral Miami Beach and its sister hotel Doral Golf Resort and Spa, which is also home to the Doral Open. The name was created by Doris (née Bernstein) and Alfred Kaskel, combining "Dor" and "Al" from each of their names.

Alfred's last major development was 90 Park Avenue, a 41-story office building and skyscraper in Midtown Manhattan located at 40th Street and Park Avenue, two blocks from Grand Central. The property opened in 1964, four years before Alfred's death in 1968.
