= List of grants made by the Donald J. Trump Foundation =

The Donald J. Trump Foundation was a New York-based charitable foundation founded by Donald Trump. The following is a partial list of grants made by the foundation from 2006 through 2009.

== Partial list of grants reported by the Foundation Center ==
The foundation's annual IRS Form 990 filing would normally contain the full list of grants made by the foundation. The following lists are incomplete.

The following were reported to the Foundation Center during the year 2006:

- United Way of New York City – $250,000
- Operation Smile – $117,000
- Dana Farber Cancer Institute – $60,000
- Police Athletic League of New York – $60,000
- Intrepid Museum Foundation – $50,000
- Visiting Nurse and Hospice Care – $25,000
- Metropolitan Museum of Art – $15,000

The following grants were reported to the Foundation Center during the year 2007:

- Police Athletic League of New York – $110,000
- Fisher House Foundation of Maryland – $100,000
- New York-Presbyterian Hospital – $100,000
- Metropolitan Golf Association Foundation – $50,000
- Dana Farber Cancer Institute – $25,000
- Disabled Veterans LIFE Memorial Foundation of Florida – $25,000
- Joe Torre Safe at Home Foundation of New York – $25,000
- New York City Police Foundation – $25,000
- Palm Beach Police Department of Florida – $25,000

The Palm Beach Post has listed some additional recipients, as "a few of the larger donations made by the foundation through the years":

- Billy Graham Evangelistic Association and Samaritan’s Purse – $135,000
- Leukemia and Lymphoma Society – $50,000
- Drumthwacket Foundation – $40,000
- Citizens United Foundation – $100,000

According to a review by the International Business Times, the Trump Foundation did not give to right-wing causes until 2010, when donations to conservative organizations were first reported. Among these organizations, the Foundation gave:

- Liberty Central Inc. – $10,000 in 2010
- Citizens Against Government Waste – $10,000 in 2010
- Billy Graham Evangelistic Association – $50,000 in 2012
- American Conservative Union – $50,00 in 2013
- Family Leader Foundation – $20,000 in 2013 and 2014
- Citizens United Foundation – $100,000 in 2014

In 2010, the Trump Foundation made a $10,000 contribution to Jenny McCarthy's Generation Rescue, an organization that promotes vaccine hesitancy.
