= Trump National Doral Miami =

Golf resort in Florida, United States

Coordinates: 25°49′10″N 80°20′34″W

- Interactive map of Trump National Doral Miami

Club information
- Location: Doral, Florida, United States
- Established: 1962
- Type: Resort
- Owner: The Trump Organization
- Total holes: 90
- Tournaments: Doral Open (1962–2006); WGC-Cadillac Championship (2007–2016); LIV Golf Miami (2022–2025); Cadillac Championship (from 2026)
- Website: trumpgolfdoral.com

Blue Monster
- Designed by: Dick Wilson
- Par: 72
- Length: 7,510 yards (6,870 m)
- Course rating: 76.8
- Slope rating: 143
- Course record: 61 – Stephen Ames (2000)

Silver Fox
- Designed by: Jim McLean
- Par: 70
- Length: 6,557 yards (5,996 m)
- Course rating: 72.8
- Slope rating: 143

Golden Palm
- Designed by: Raymond Floyd (redesign)
- Par: 70
- Length: 6,609 yards (6,043 m)
- Course rating: 72.2
- Slope rating: 135

Red Tiger
- Par: 70
- Length: 6,101 yards (5,579 m)
- Course rating: 69.4
- Slope rating: 131
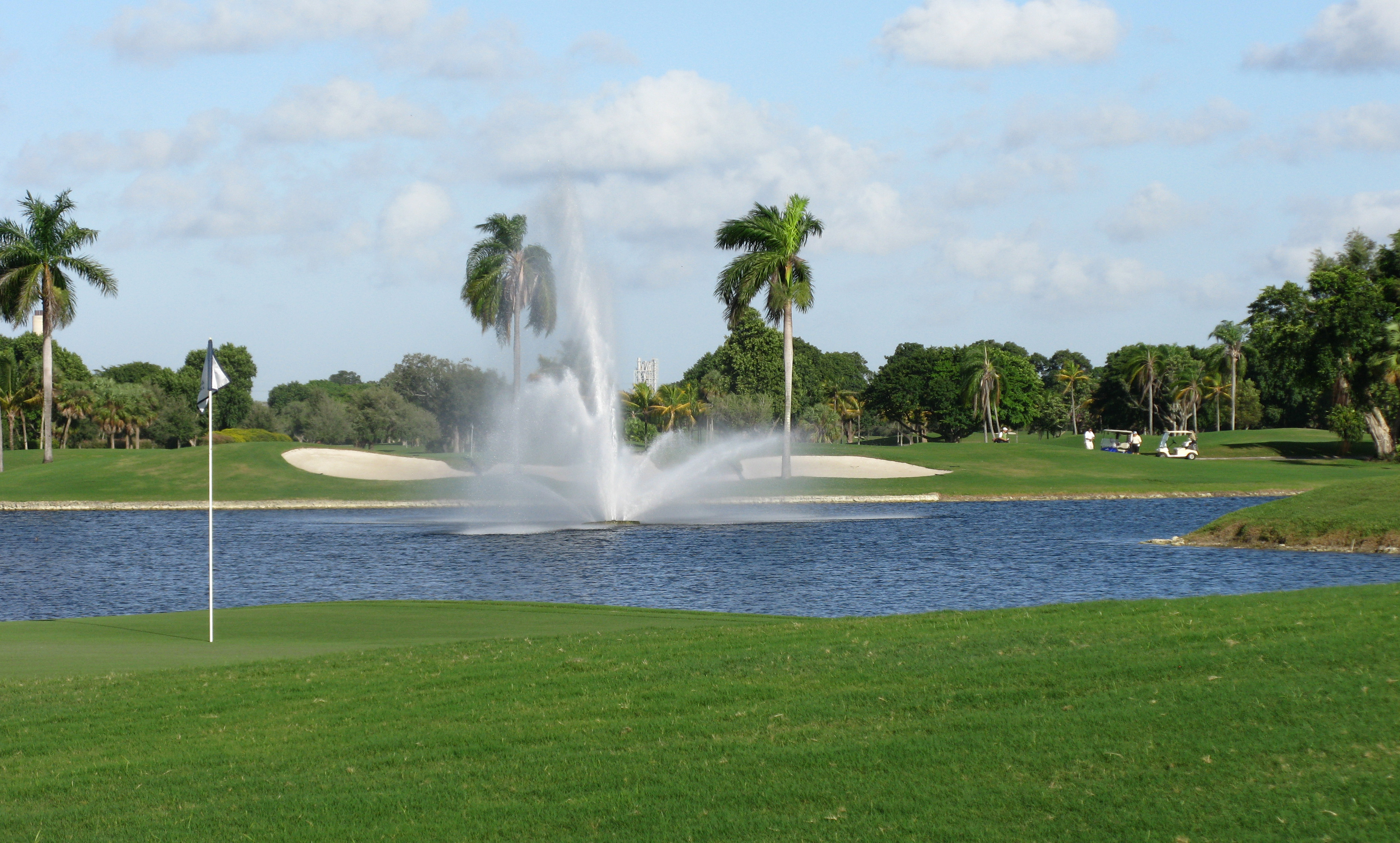
- The 18th hole of the Blue Monster course in 2010

Trump National Doral Miami, also known as Doral Resort and Spa, is a golf resort in Doral in South Florida in the United States. It was founded by real estate pioneer Alfred Kaskel in 1962, with the name Doral coming from an amalgamation of his name Albert and his wife's name Doris. The resort has 72 holes of golf, and its signature course is the Blue Monster which has hosted numerous PGA Tour events and was also featured in the PGA Tour video game series.

The resort consists of 800 acres (3.2 km^{2}). Prior to its renovation, the club was reported to feature "four golf courses; 700 hotel rooms across 10 lodges; more than 86,000 square feet (8,000 m^{2}) of meeting space, including a 25,000-square-foot (2,300 m^{2}) ballroom; a 50,000-square-foot (4,600 m^{2}) spa with 33 treatment rooms; six food and beverage outlets; extensive retail; and a private members' clubhouse."

== History ==
The Doral Country Club was built for $10 million (equivalent to $106 million in 2025) by Carol Management, a New York-based real estate firm headed by Alfred Kaskel. The club opened in January 1962.

The resort was the sister hotel to the famous Doral Hotel on the ocean in Miami Beach, Florida.

In 1994, Carol Management sold a majority stake in the resort to KSL Recreation, a Kohlberg Kravis Roberts affiliate focused on premier golf facilities, for approximately $100 million. KSL was then purchased in 2004 by CNL Hospitality (later CNL Hotels & Resorts), a real estate investment trust affiliated with CNL Financial Group. CNL placed the resort under the management of Marriott International later that year. In 2007, CNL Hotels was acquired by the real estate arm of Morgan Stanley.

Around 2010, the Pritikin Longevity Center moved into the spa area of the Doral resort.

In 2011, a group of creditors led by Paulson & Co. took control of the Doral and seven other properties from Morgan Stanley. They quickly placed the Doral and four of the other properties under Chapter 11 bankruptcy protection, and began seeking a buyer for the Doral.

In February 2012, the Trump Organization purchased the Doral Resort & Spa out of bankruptcy for $150 million. The property's name was then changed to Trump National Doral. Trump began a $250-million renovation of the resort in 2013, which was completed in 2016. The purchase and renovation were financed with $125 million in loans from Deutsche Bank.

Trump's purchase included four of the five golf courses. The fifth, the "Great White Course," was excluded from the sale because of its high potential for redevelopment. Instead, it was sold, along with the other bankrupt properties, to GIC, a creditor in the case. GIC sold the course in 2016 for $96 million to two homebuilders: Lennar and CC Homes.

In May 2019, it was reported the resort was in "steep decline" financially, in which its net operating income had fallen by 69 percent – from $13.8 million in 2015 to $4.3 million two years later.

In 2022, Axos Financial refinanced the $125 million mortgage held by Deutsche Bank.

In 2021, Deutsche Bank hired the Newmark Group to appraise the resort. The appraisal concluded that "Trump had spent $379 million buying and renovating the resort, and that it was worth only $297 million". While like other Trump properties that benefited "from people looking to buy proximity to a president during Mr. Trump’s first term, his managers believed even more potential customers stayed away because of him", pushing "down bookings and room rates for six years running" with management believing “the Trump brand has negatively impacted” revenues. The appraisal similarly stated “we believe that with a different brand, the subject might perform better.”

In 2025, Trump National Doral Miami was chosen to host the 2026 G20 Miami summit. The announcement was made by Miami Mayor Francis Suarez in the Oval Office and later confirmed by Doral Mayor Christi Fraga.

In 2026, Don Colossus, a 15 ft golden statue of Donald Trump, was erected on display at Trump National Doral Miami.

=== Lawsuits and legal controversies ===
Trump "has been the target of dozens of liens" from contractors who worked on the renovation project. On May 20, 2016, a Miami-Dade County Circuit Court judge ordered Trump National Doral Miami to be foreclosed and sold on June 28 unless the Trump Organization paid $32,800 to a Miami paint supply company.

A 6-foot (1.8 m) high portrait of Donald Trump painted by Miami Beach-based artist Havi Schanz, which became controversial when it was reported to be purchased for $10,000 with funds from the non-profit Trump Foundation, hangs on the wall in the resort's Champions Bar & Grill.

Since Trump purchased the resort in 2012, he has challenged the local property tax assessments every year. In filings with the Federal Election Commission, Trump has consistently claimed high property values for his golf courses; in tax proceedings, however, Trump has generally claimed substantially lower values. In August 2016, Doral Councilwoman Sandra Ruiz challenged the tax assessment for the Doral resort, saying that it was too low and did not account for renovations that increased the value.

In October 2019, amidst the impeachment inquiry against Donald Trump, the White House announced that the Doral would host the upcoming 46th G7 summit. Trump suggested that the resort would host the event "at cost" or perhaps at no cost to the American taxpayer. The move prompted renewed criticism that Trump was self-dealing in violation of the Foreign Emoluments Clause of the United States Constitution. House Judiciary Committee chairman Jerry Nadler called the selection of Doral "among the most brazen examples yet of the President's corruption." Lack of support from Trump's Republican allies who had grown weary of defending him led Trump to abandon his plans within days of the announcement. This was notable as it was a rare crack in the wall of Trump's Republican support.

== Golf courses and tournaments ==
Trump National Doral, Miami features four championship golf courses:

- Blue Monster
- Golden Palm
- Red Tiger
- Silver Fox

The Blue Monster originally opened in 1962 and was designed by Dick Wilson, and was most recently modernized by Gil Hanse and Jim Wagner in 2014.

The Blue Monster played host to the Doral Open on the PGA Tour from 1962 to 2006, and from 2007 to 2016 the WGC-Cadillac Championship made its home there after having been played at different venues in the United States and Europe since its inception in 1999. In 2016, it was announced that the tournament would be moved to Mexico City. The Blue Monster hosted the final event of the inaugural LIV Golf Invitational Series in 2022, and a regular season event in each of the subsequent three seasons. In August 2025, the PGA Tour announced that they would be returning to the Blue Monster course with a new "Signature Event", provisionally titled the Cadillac Championship, during the 2026 season.

The resort's other courses have also played host to important events. The Golden Palm hosted the PGA Tour's Qualifying Tournament in 1999 and since 2018 hosts the PGA Tour Latinoamérica Shell Tour Championship, and the Red Tiger hosted The Office Depot on the LPGA Tour in 2000, in addition in 2018 the Shell Tour Championship.

The Latinoamérica Tour Championship was moved in October 2018 after plans to demolish host course Melreese Country Club to build Nu Stadium were announced. Initially, the Shell Tour Championship finished on the 18th hole of Red Tiger, a 526-yard par-5, instead of the Golden Palm 18th, a 469-yard par-4 featuring an island green.

== Scorecard ==
Trump National Doral Miami – The Blue Monster
Tee	Rating/Slope	1	2	3	4	5	6	7	8	9	Out	10	11	12	13	14	15	16	17	18	In	Total
Black	77.4 / 146	578	446	441	206	421	432	474	553	210	3765	626	423	599	245	482	155	345	428	477	3780	7545
Gold	75.0 / 140	560	376	403	194	396	414	441	520	204	3508	587	352	582	228	442	144	329	405	446	3515	7023
Blue	73.5 / 139	545	358	390	177	377	399	430	495	191	3362	577	328	568	214	425	133	316	387	411	3359	6721
White	71.7 / 139	530	340	359	163	358	385	419	471	178	3203	524	304	554	200	408	121	285	369	392	3157	6360
SI	Men's	11	17	1	3	13	5	9	7	15		10	18	8	2	6	16	14	12	4
Par		5	4	4	3	4	4	4	5	3	36	5	4	5	3	4	3	4	4	4	36	72
SI	Women's	9	17	5	15	13	1	3	7	11		4	18	10	2	8	14	16	12	6
Red	67.6 / 132	439	322	297	137	313	345	387	416	142	2798	435	280	491	171	312	109	255	289	340	2682	5480

== See also ==
- Donald Trump and golf
- List of things named after Donald Trump
- Title of Nobility Clause
