= Belmont Plaza Hotel =

Former hotel in Manhattan, New York

Coordinates: 40°45′22″N 73°58′20″W

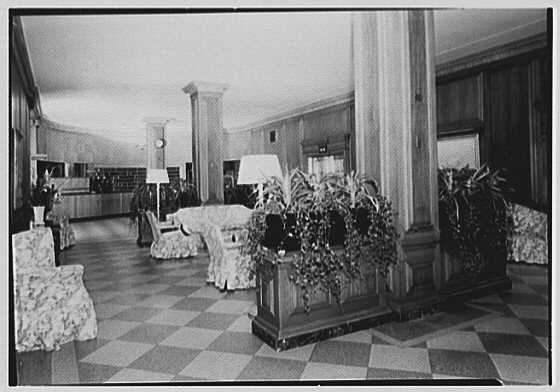
The interior in 1942

Belmont Plaza Hotel was a hotel in New York City at 49th Street and 541-555 Lexington Avenue, across the street from the Waldorf Astoria.

It was purchased by real estate developer and hotelier Alfred Kaskel in the fall of 1945. The Glass Hat Club at the Belmont was a popular supper club, where Dean Martin and Jerry Lewis were performing when they met in August 1944.

In August 1964, the land on which the hotel was situated had been sold to the Massachusetts Mutual Life Insurance Company for $4.4 million, but that they leased it back immediately to Kaskel and his Belplaza Corporation.

== History ==
The Belmont Plaza was a 15-story 800-room hotel opposite the Waldorf Astoria. In an October 1937 LIFE magazine article it mentioned that the Belmont Plaza was the "Home of the famous new Glass Hat". The Glass Hat Club was a popular supper club at the hotel which had a capacity of 444 people and as of 1947 charged a minimum fee of $2.50 for entry for shows put on between 8:30 pm and midnight. The bar of the Glass Hat was designed by Jac Lessman in a circular style, to give the room a "feeling of cheerfulness and informality".

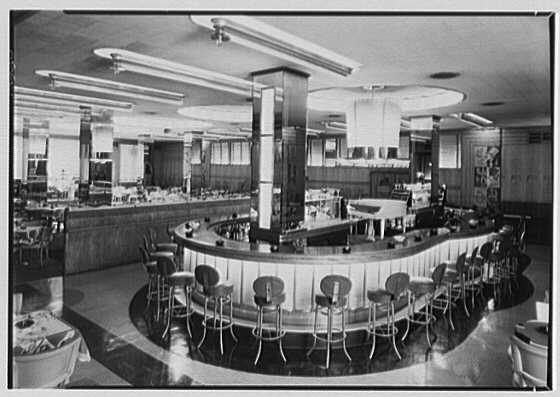
The circular bar at the Glass Hat Club of the Belmont Plaza Hotel

In November 1942, Billboard mentioned that Jack Marshall made his debut at the Glass Hat club and had a nine-week stint performing there. The Glass Hat Club was where Dean Martin and Jerry Lewis were performing where they met in August 1944. According to Lewis, the two men met initially in the lobby of the Belmont Plaza where Martin approached him and said "Hey, I saw your act, you're a funny kid". Martin was singing at the club at the time and the two happened to be on the same bill, though the two wouldn't start performing together as a duo until the 500 Club in Atlantic City.

Alfred Kaskel and his Carol Management Corporation purchased the Belmont Plaza hotel in the fall of 1945. Kaskel was the head of the Montrose Industrial Bank of Brooklyn at the time. Billboard noted that up until his purchase, the Glass Hat Club had operated on a much more modest budget.

In 1950, it was reported that an initial 200 rooms of the hotel had recently been renovated; at the time it was described as a "700-suite hotel".

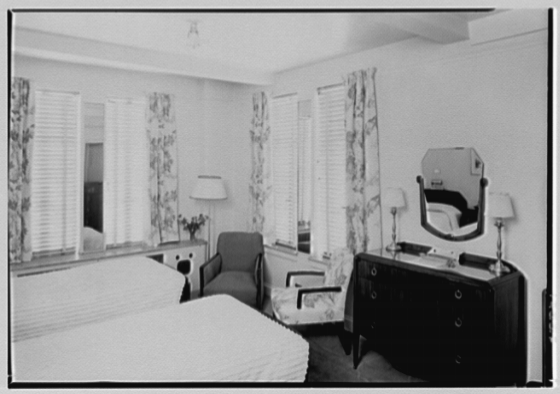
Hotel room

Luncheons and receptions at the Belmont Plaza were still held in the "Moderne Room" and conferences in the "Baroque Room" of the hotel in the 1950s. By 1959, it was reported that the hotel "leases to the Pick Hotel chain for an annual rental of $ 332,750".

In August 1964, The New York Times reported that the land on which the hotel was situated had been sold to the Massachusetts Mutual Life Insurance Company for $4.4 million, but that they leased it back immediately to Kaskel and his Belplaza Corporation.
