= Havi Schanz =

Argentine-American artist

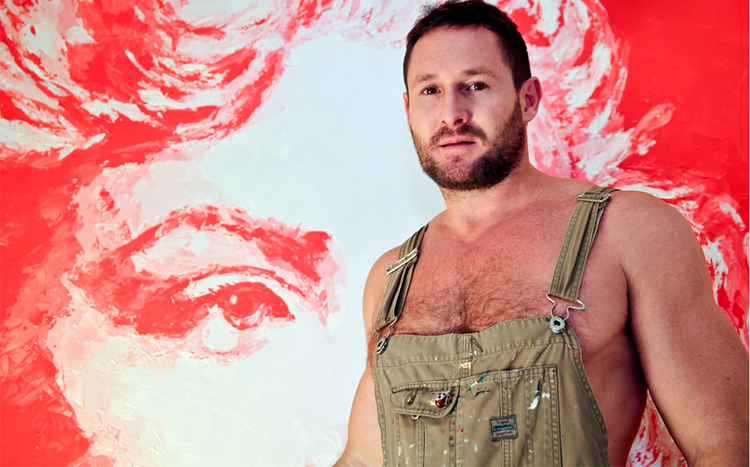

Havi Schanz also known as Havi Art, was born in Argentina in Santa Fe City. He has been living in Miami Beach since 2005. He draws upon impressionistic, romantic, and baroque influences to create a representation of pop culture iconography.

Havi Schanz's art has been widely exhibited in several solo and group exhibitions in Argentina, Panama, Venezuela, Colombia, United Kingdom, Italy, France, Spain, Czech Republic, Germany, Greece, Australia, New Zealand, Mexico and the United States. In Miami his work was exhibited in Aldo Castillos Gallery, ArtSpot Miami, and Art Basel 2014.

== Works ==
=== Divas & Divos (2013–2014) ===
Schanz celebrates the golden age of cinema with portraits of some of the most recognizable and storied faces in film. Schanz's Divas series focuses on female sensuality and beauty, while Divos pays tribute to the divine masculine. Schanz primarily works in acrylic with a palette knife on canvas.

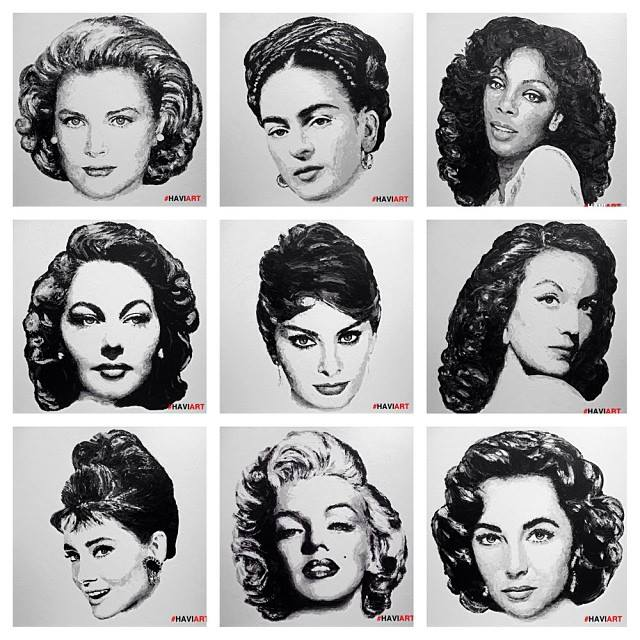
Divas Collection

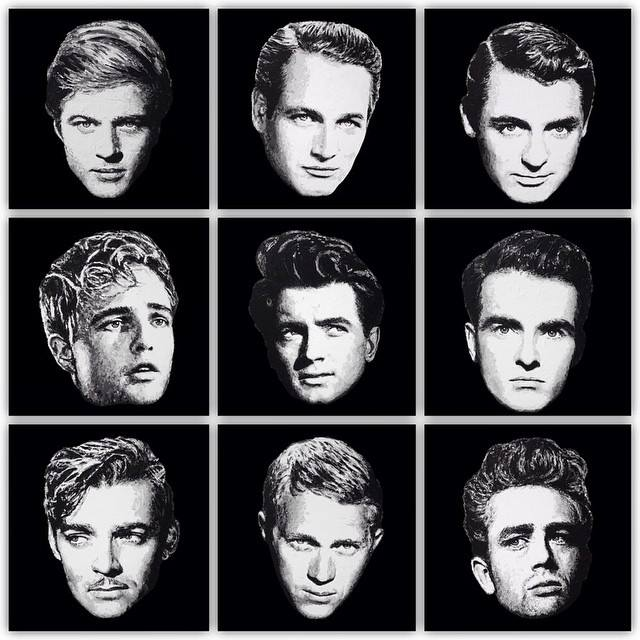
Divos Collection

=== Robin Williams Immortalized in Ocean Drive ===
Schanz painted a portrait of Robin Williams as his The Birdcage character that now adorns the Carlyle's Hotel front porch.

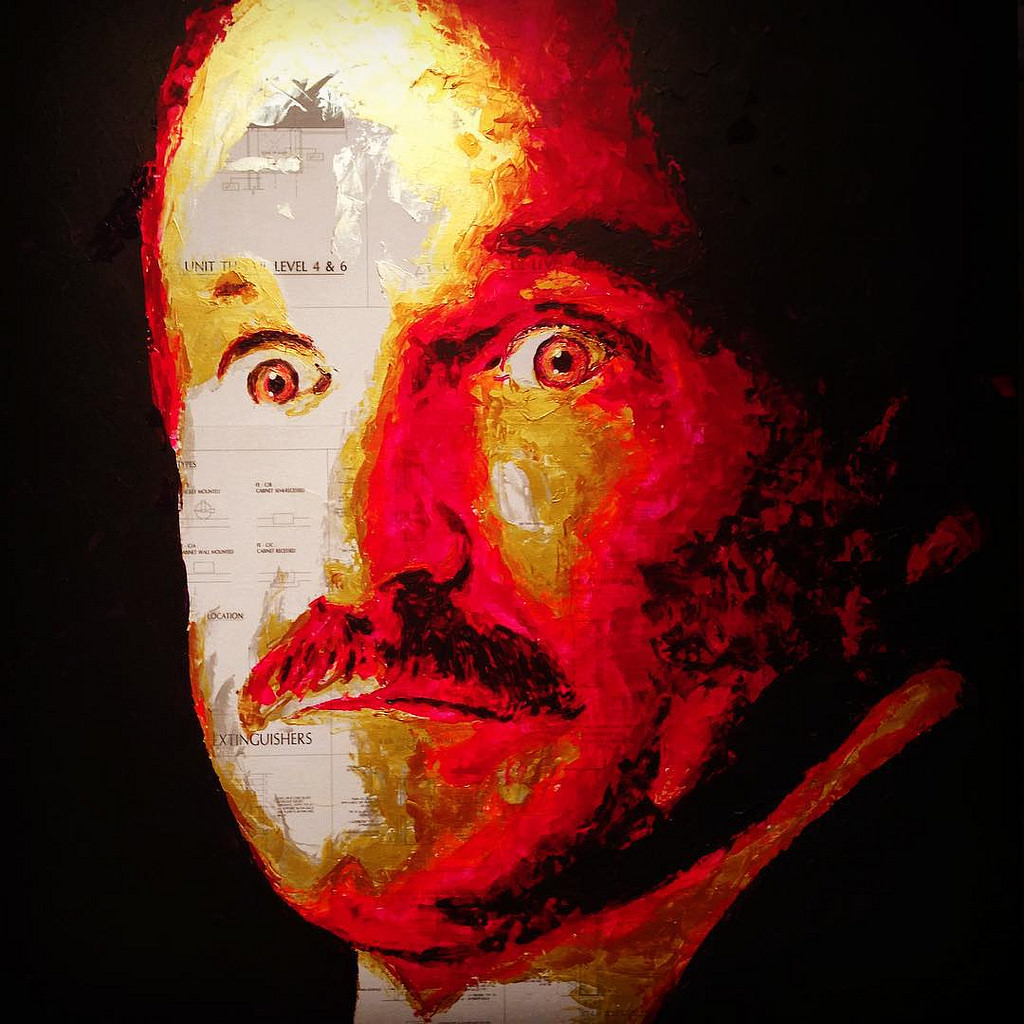
Robin Williams Portrait by Schanz

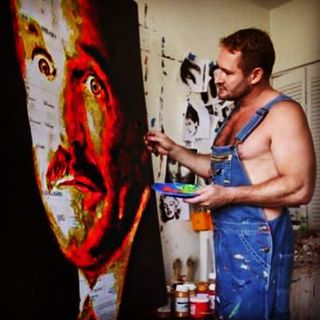
Schanz painting Robin Williams Portrait

Schanz has donated many of his paintings to benefit charitable organizations like Children's Autism Foundation, Human Rights Campaign, Lions Club International, Make-A-Wish Foundation, and Unicorn Children's Foundation, aidscareos.com, among others. He also sold a portrait of Donald Trump to the Trump Foundation.

He has collaborated with Gloria Estefan and her husband Emilio to create a portrait that was auctioned to benefit the non-profit group Equality. Also, Toby Keith, Cindy Crawford, and David Cook signed their portraits for auction.
