= List of things named after John F. Kennedy =

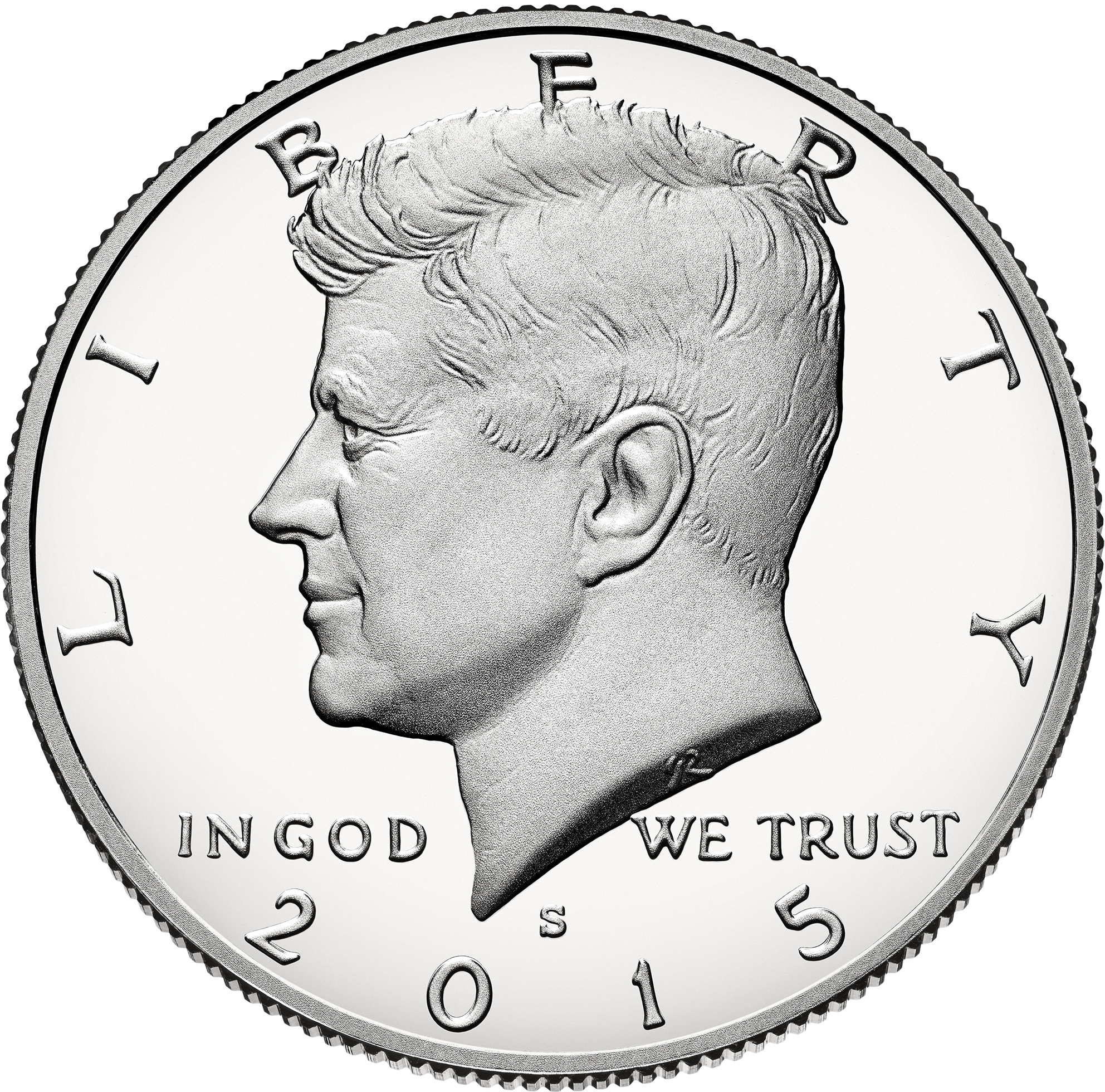
Kennedy has appeared on the US half-dollar coin since 1964

This is a list of memorials to John F. Kennedy, the 35th president of the United States.

== Memorials, busts, and statues ==
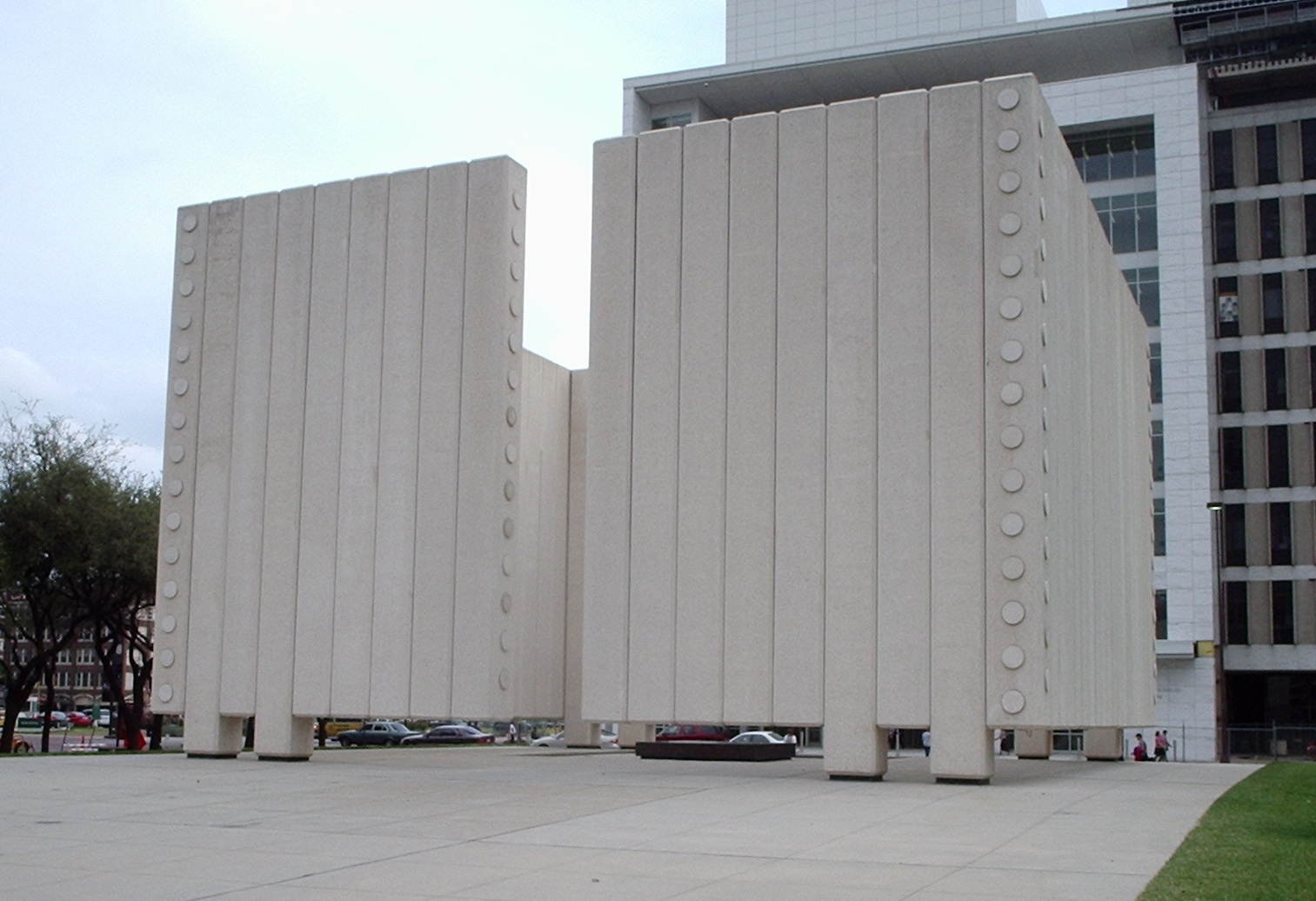
The John Fitzgerald Kennedy Memorial in Dallas, Texas

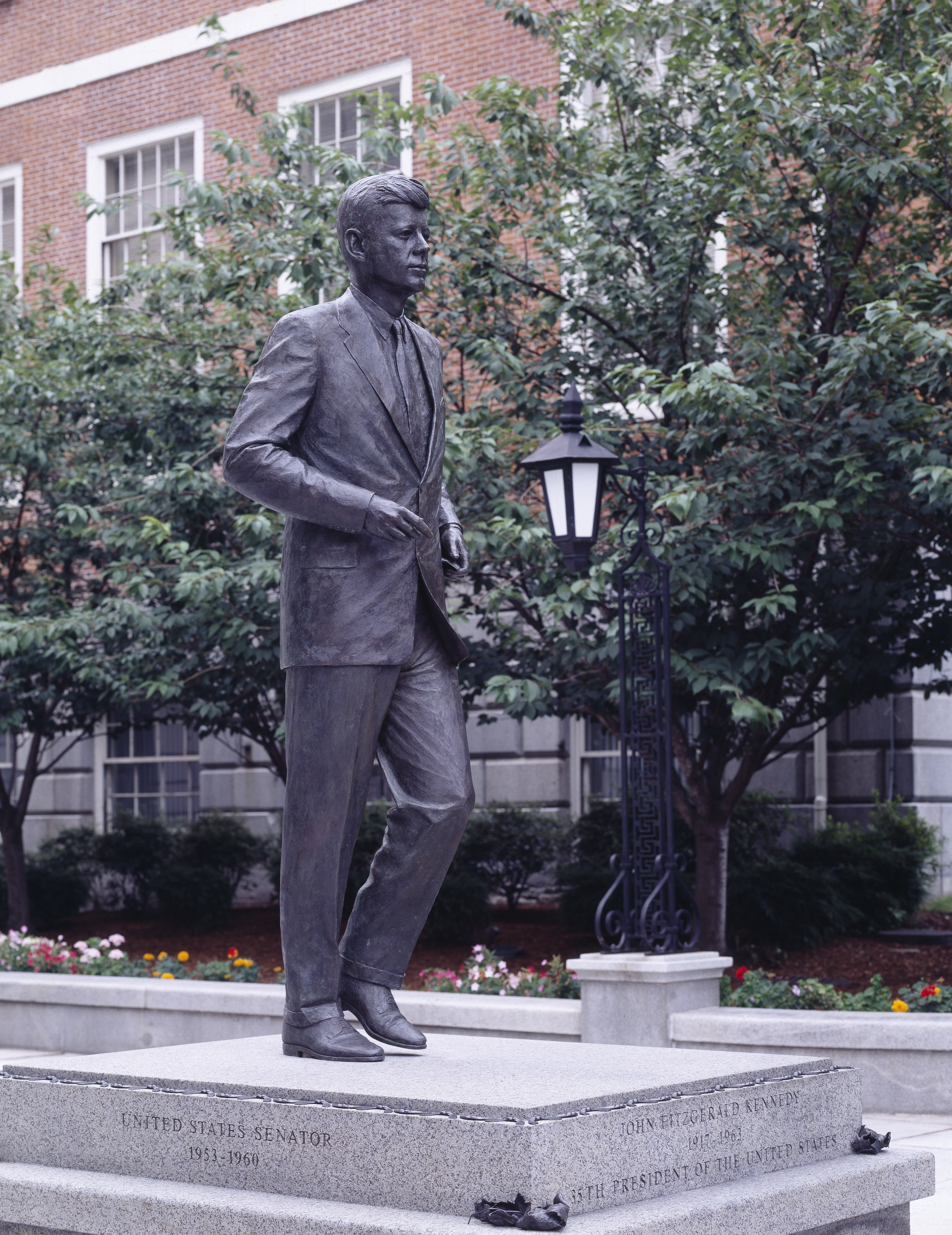
JFK statue outside the Massachusetts State House in Boston

=== In the United States ===
- John Fitzgerald Kennedy Memorial in Dallas, Texas
- JFK Tribute across from the Hotel Texas in Fort Worth, Texas
- The Eternal Flame, JFK's final resting place at Arlington National Cemetery just outside Washington, D.C.
- John F. Kennedy Memorial and bust in front of the Holy Cross Church in Holyoke, Massachusetts (dedicated in 1967)
- John F. Kennedy Monument and Eternal Flame Memorial, in Forest Park, in Springfield
- A bust of President Kennedy was dedicated on May 31, 1965, at Grand Army Plaza in Brooklyn, New York. The bust was removed in 2003 for restoration, and reinstalled in 2010.
- Jacques Lipchitz's bust of Kennedy at the Military Park in Newark, New Jersey was dedicated on November 11, 1965.
- A life size statue of President John F. Kennedy in the presidential statues across from the Puerto Rico Capitol in San Juan, Puerto Rico.
- A bust of President John F. Kennedy by Felix de Weldon at Kennedy Library, Columbia Point, Boston, Massachusetts
- John F. Kennedy Memorial located in Hyannis, Massachusetts on Ocean Street was dedicated on July 8, 1966.
- A bronze statue of John F. Kennedy by Isabel McIlvain on the grounds of the Massachusetts State House was dedicated on May 29, 1990.
- John Fitzgerald Kennedy Memorial in Portland, Oregon
- A bust of John F. Kennedy, in downtown Nashua, New Hampshire, commemorates January 25, 1960, as the first campaign stop in Kennedy's bid for the presidency.
- J. F. Kennedy Memorial, Kennedy Plaza, Long Beach, New York. A rectangular stone wall adorned with a bronze inscription plaque containing a relief of John F. Kennedy in proper left profile encircled by an inscription and a wreath of laurel leaves. The wall is installed in a pool of water.

=== Outside the United States ===
Kennedy memorial in New Ross, Ireland

- Argentina
  - Kennedy memorial in Quemú Quemú, Argentina built in 1967.
- Australia
  - John F. Kennedy Memorial stone and plaque, located in the Fitzroy Gardens, Melbourne, Victoria, was dedicated in May 1964 by the then Lord Mayor of Melbourne, His Worship the Right Honourable Edward Leo Curtis.
- Canada
  - A bust of President Kennedy by Hungarian-Canadian Paul Lancz (1919-2005) stands on President Kennedy Avenue (French: Avenue du Président-Kennedy) in Montreal, Quebec. It was dedicated in 1986 and relocated in 2011 to a different site on the same street due to the development of the Quartier des spectacles.
- England
  - John F. Kennedy Memorial, London, a bust by Jacques Lipchitz, which stands outside International Student House on Great Portland Street in London. It was unveiled in May 1965 by Senator Robert Kennedy. It originally stood on Marylebone Road and was moved to its present location in 2019.
  - A Kennedy memorial was established in Runnymede, England, where the Magna Carta was sealed. The memorial is sited on an acre of land gifted to the United States.
  - The J. F. Kennedy Memorial, a 1968 mosaic in Birmingham, England
- Honduras
  - John F. Kennedy statue in Colonia John F. Kennedy neighborhood in Tegucigalpa, Honduras
- Ireland
  - On June 29, 2008, Kennedy's sister, Jean Kennedy Smith, unveiled a statue of her late brother at New Ross, County Wexford, Ireland.
- Israel
  - Yad Kennedy, a memorial to the US president, was established on a crest in the Jerusalem Forest, part of which is designated the John F. Kennedy Peace Forest, on the southwest outskirts of Jerusalem, Israel, near Aminadav.
- Italy
  - In Bellagio, Italy, a memorial to President Kennedy was inaugurated in June 2018
- Monaco
  - Avenue J.F. Kennedy in Monaco, the access road from the Sainte-Dévote Chapel down to the Port Hercule.
- Spain
  - In Barcelona, Spain, the Plaça de John F Kennedy, a square in the northwestern suburb of Sarrià-Sant Gervasi.
- Turkiye
  - Kennedy Avenue in Istanbul, Turkey, the course of the road roughly follows the old city sea walls.
- Vietnam
  - The square surrounding the Notre-Dame Cathedral Basilica of Saigon was named President John F. Kennedy Square in 1964. However, following the Fall of Saigon, it was renamed Paris Commune Square (Công trường Công xã Paris).

== Cities ==
- Colonia John F. Kennedy in Tegucigalpa, Honduras
- Ciudad Kennedy in Bogotá, Colombia. The eighth locality of Bogotá, capital of Colombia. It is located in the southwest of the city.
- Presidente Kennedy, a municipality in the state of Espírito Santo, Brazil
- Presidente Kennedy, a municipality in the state of Tocantins, Brazil

== Schools ==
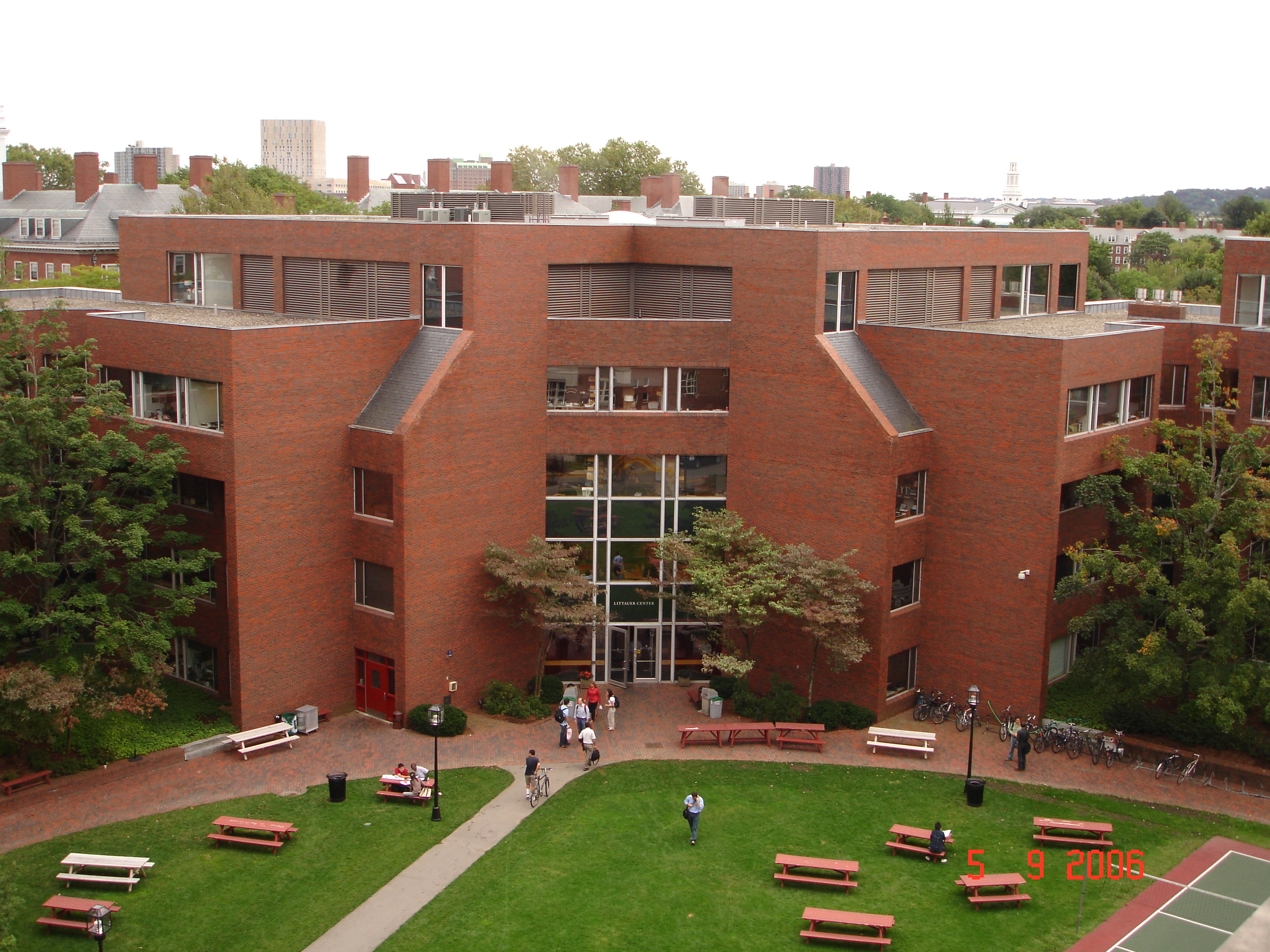
Kennedy School of Government building at Harvard University

=== In the United States ===
- At Harvard University in Cambridge, Massachusetts:
  - The Harvard Institute of Politics serves as a living memorial which promotes public service in his name.
  - The School of Government is known as the John F. Kennedy School of Government.
- John F. Kennedy University opened in Pleasant Hill, California, in 1964 as a school for adult education.
- Hundreds of schools across the US were named in Kennedy's honor. Several school claim to be the first in the United States named after him, while he was alive, among them John F. Kennedy High School in Cheektowaga, New York, and John F. Kennedy Junior High School in Cupertino, California. In the week after Kennedy's death, the first schools renamed for him were the Kennedy Elementary School in Butte, Montana, and the John F. Kennedy Middle School on Long Island in Bethpage, New York. Both schools held board meetings on November 26, at which time the new names were adopted.
- John F. Kennedy High School in Cedar Rapids, Iowa
- John F. Kennedy Catholic School, Warren, Ohio
- John F. Kennedy Catholic High School, in Burien, Washington
- John F. Kennedy Elementary School, Great Neck, New York, United States
- John F. Kennedy University School of Medicine, a private, offshore medical college in Willemstad.
- John F. Kennedy Memorial School (Biddeford, Maine)
- John F. Kennedy High School (Los Angeles), Granada Hills, California
- John F. Kennedy High School (Fremont, California)
- John F. Kennedy High School (Montgomery County, Maryland)
- John F. Kennedy High School (La Palma, California)
- John F. Kennedy High School (Guam)
- John F. Kennedy Memorial High School (Woodbridge, New Jersey)
- John F. Kennedy Middle School, (Enfield, Connecticut)
- John F. Kennedy Elementary school, (Butte, Montana)
- John F. Kennedy Middle School (Plainfield, Illinois)
- John F. Kennedy Middle School (North Miami Beach, Florida)

=== Outside the United States ===
- John F Kennedy Catholic School, in Hemel Hempstead, England
- John F. Kennedy Elementary and High School (Tegucigalpa, Honduras)
- John F. Kennedy High School (Montreal), Montreal, Quebec, Canada
- John F. Kennedy School, Berlin, Berlin, Germany
- John F. Kennedy Public School (Faridabad, India)
- Universidad Argentina John F. Kennedy (Buenos Aires, Argentina)
- Hong Kong Red Cross John F. Kennedy Centre (Hong Kong)
- John F. Kennedy Public High School, (Addis Ababa Ethiopia)
- John Kennedy College, Mauritius
- In 1966, a new secondary school (for students aged 11–18) was founded in Coventry, England. Originally scheduled to be named Rookery Farm School for the farmland previously on the site, it was instead named President Kennedy School.
- Several schools in The Netherlands are named after him, including John F Kennedy-School in The Hague, John F. Kennedy Basisschool in Volendam, Basisschool John F. Kennedy in Oss, Rooms Katholieke Basisschool John F. Kennedyschool in Arnhem, John F Kennedyschool in Hendrik-Ido-Ambacht, John F. Kennedy School in 's-Gravenzande, and Jenaplanschool John F. Kennedy in Zwijndrecht.

== Buildings ==
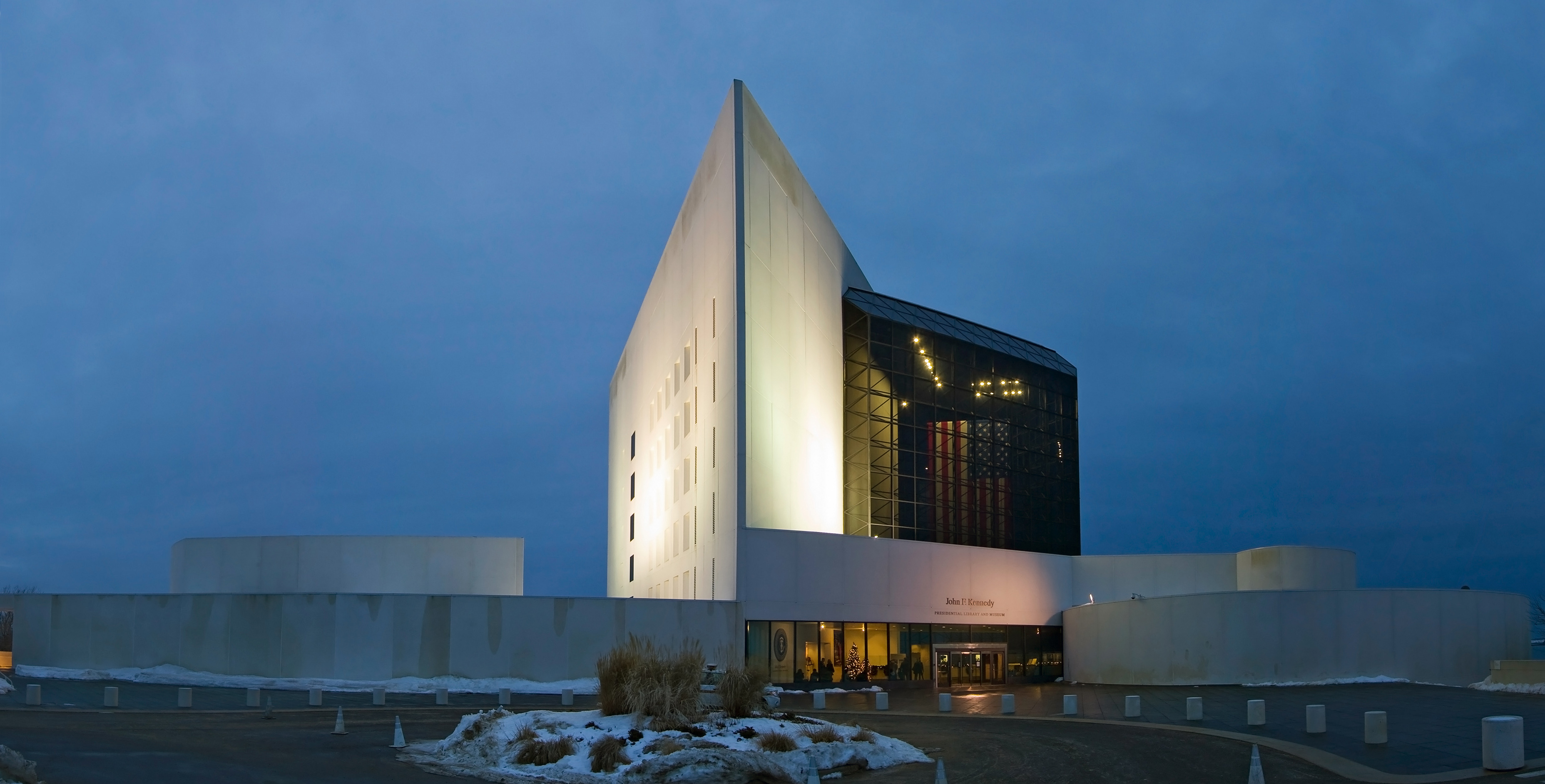
John F. Kennedy Presidential Library and Museum in Boston, Massachusetts

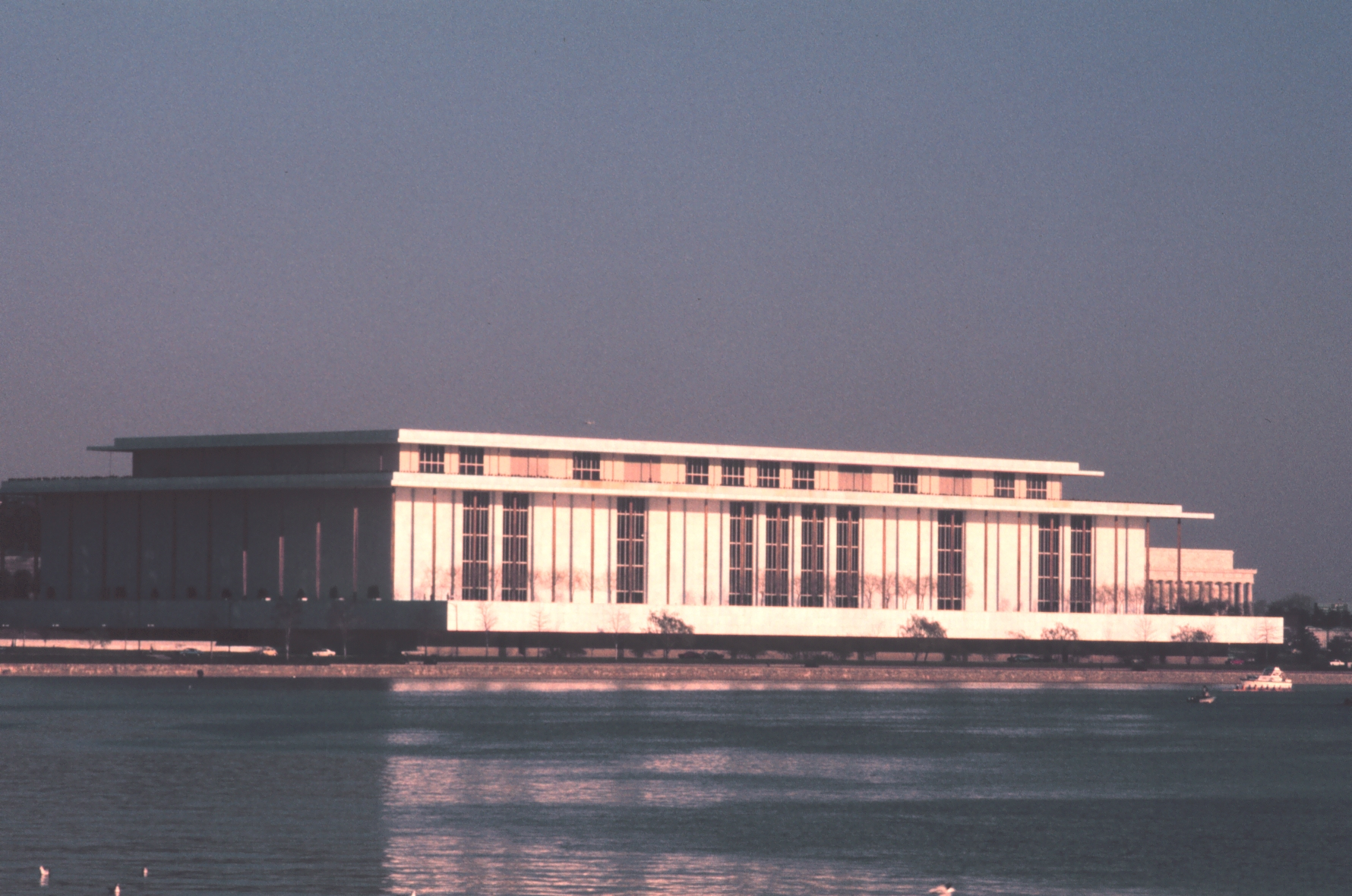
John F. Kennedy Center for the Performing Arts in Washington, DC

- The John F. Kennedy Presidential Library and Museum on Columbia Point in Dorchester, Massachusetts opened in 1979 as Kennedy's official presidential library.
- The John F. Kennedy Center for the Performing Arts opened in 1971 in Washington, DC
- The John F. Kennedy Federal Building in Government Center, Boston.
- John F. Kennedy Stadium (Bridgeport), Bridgeport, Connecticut, United States
- JFK Stadium (Springfield, Missouri), Springfield, Missouri, United States
- One of the five residential towers at the University of Massachusetts Amherst is named "Kennedy Tower" in his honor.
- The student union at the University of Dayton is named the John F. Kennedy Memorial Union, which opened in 1964.
- A bust of JFK and a building on science campus of the French-language university Université du Québec à Montréal named the pavilion Président-Kennedy are located at President Kennedy Street's western end in Montreal.
- In Cumberland, Maryland, a low income residential apartment is named the "John F Kennedy Tower". It was dedicated by Maryland native and late brother-in-law of Kennedy, Sargent Shriver, in 1967.
- Philadelphia Municipal Stadium was renamed John F. Kennedy Stadium in 1964. It was razed in 1992 and its former location is now occupied by the Xfinity Mobile Arena.
- John F. Kennedy Library, Addis Ababa University, Ethiopia
- John F. Kennedy Library, Prince of Songkla University (Pattani Campus), Thailand.
- Kennedy Auditorium, Aligarh Muslim University, India. With a seating capacity of 1375 people, it is the central hall of Aligarh Muslim University.
- John F. Kennedy Hostel Block, Vellore Institute of Technology, Vellore, India. H and J Men's hostel blocks in Vellore campus are named after Kennedy.
- The John F. Kennedy Medical Center in Monrovia, Liberia, which is the country's national medical center.
- The John F. Kennedy Library located in Hialeah, Florida, a premiere public library located in the Miami-Dade Library System.

== Transportation facilities ==
- NASA's Launch Operations Center at Cape Canaveral was renamed the John F. Kennedy Space Center. Cape Canaveral itself was likewise renamed Cape Kennedy, but a referendum passed by Florida voters in 1973 reverted it to its original name.
- John F. Kennedy International Airport, New York City. The airport is widely referred to as "JFK" which is now its IATA code.
  - Howard Beach–JFK Airport station on the New York City Subway's A train in Howard Beach, Queens, and connecting to the AirTrain JFK to the JFK Airport
  - Sutphin Boulevard–Archer Avenue–JFK Airport station on the New York City Subway's E, J, and Z trains in Jamaica, Queens, and connecting to the AirTrain JFK
- John F. Kennedy Memorial Airport, Ashland, Wisconsin, United States.
- JFK/UMass station, a rapid transit station on the MBTA's Red Line in the Dorchester neighborhood of Boston, Massachusetts.
- British Rail Class 25 Diesel Locomotive D7523 is named John F Kennedy and is preserved at the Epping Ongar Railway in Essex, United Kingdom

== Roads and bridges ==
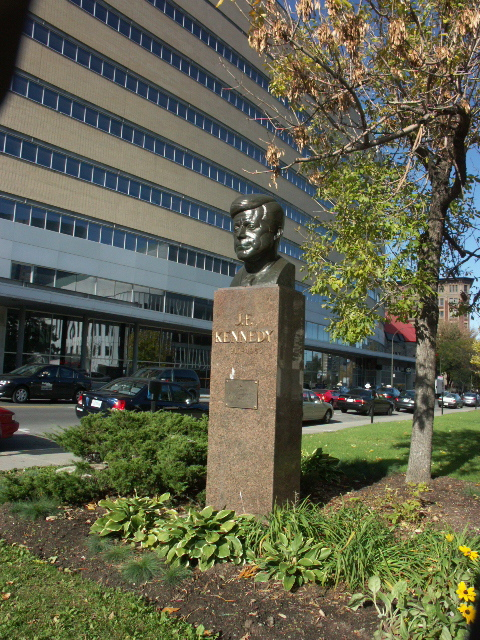
Bust of Kennedy, with UQAM President Kennedy Pavilion behind, on Président-Kennedy Avenue in Montreal

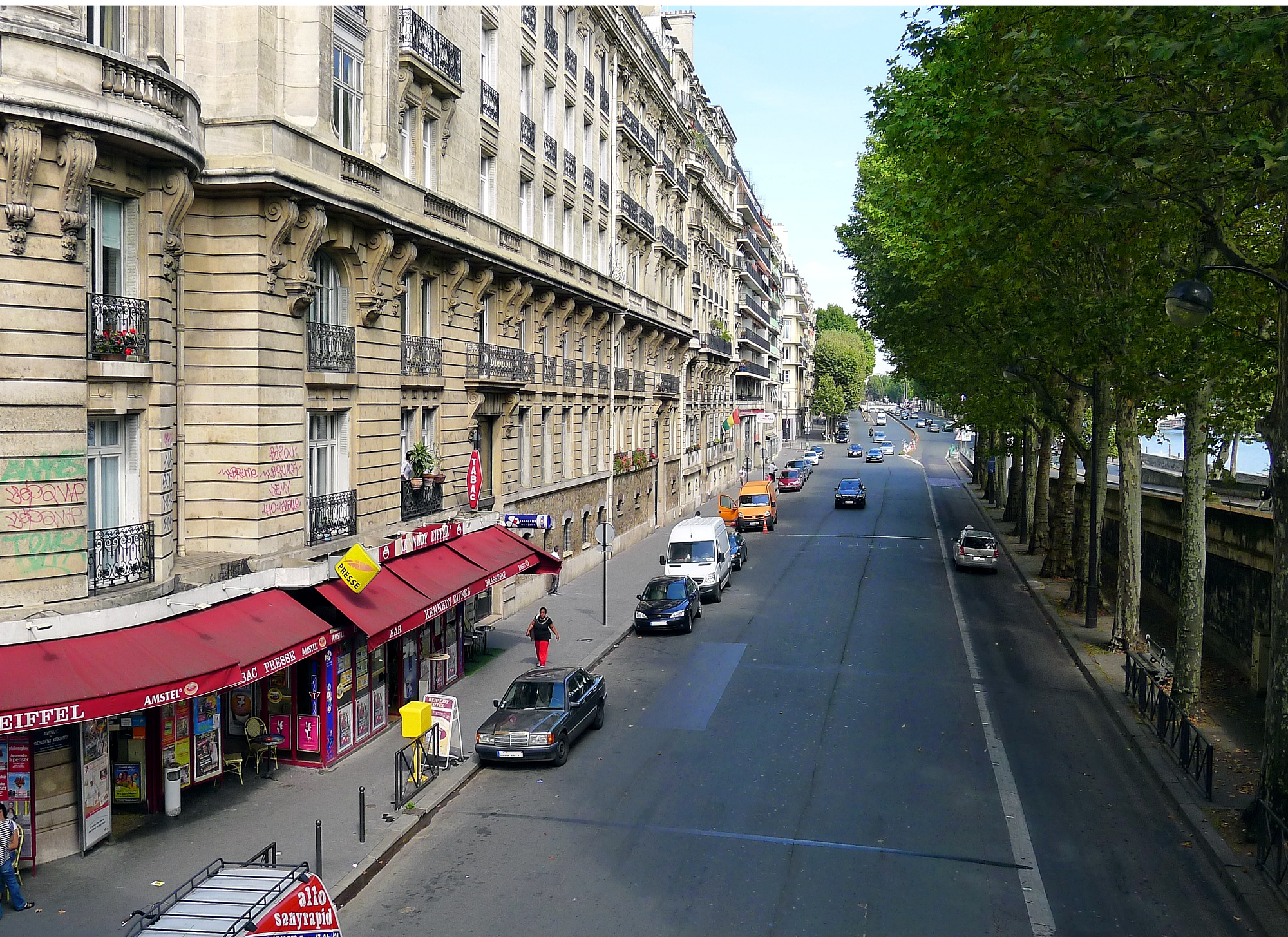
Avenue Président-Kennedy in Paris

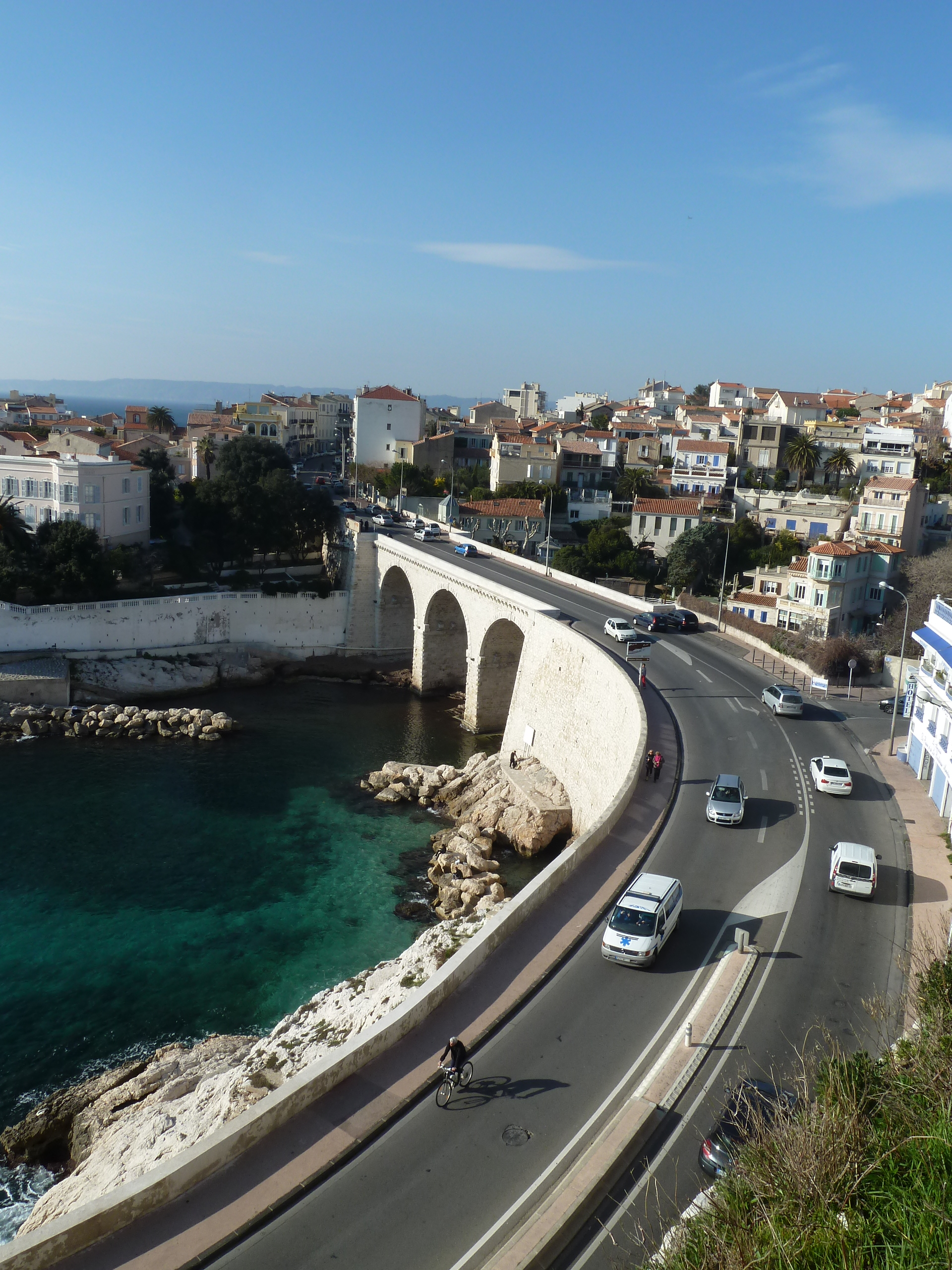
Corniche Président-John F. Kennedy in Marseille

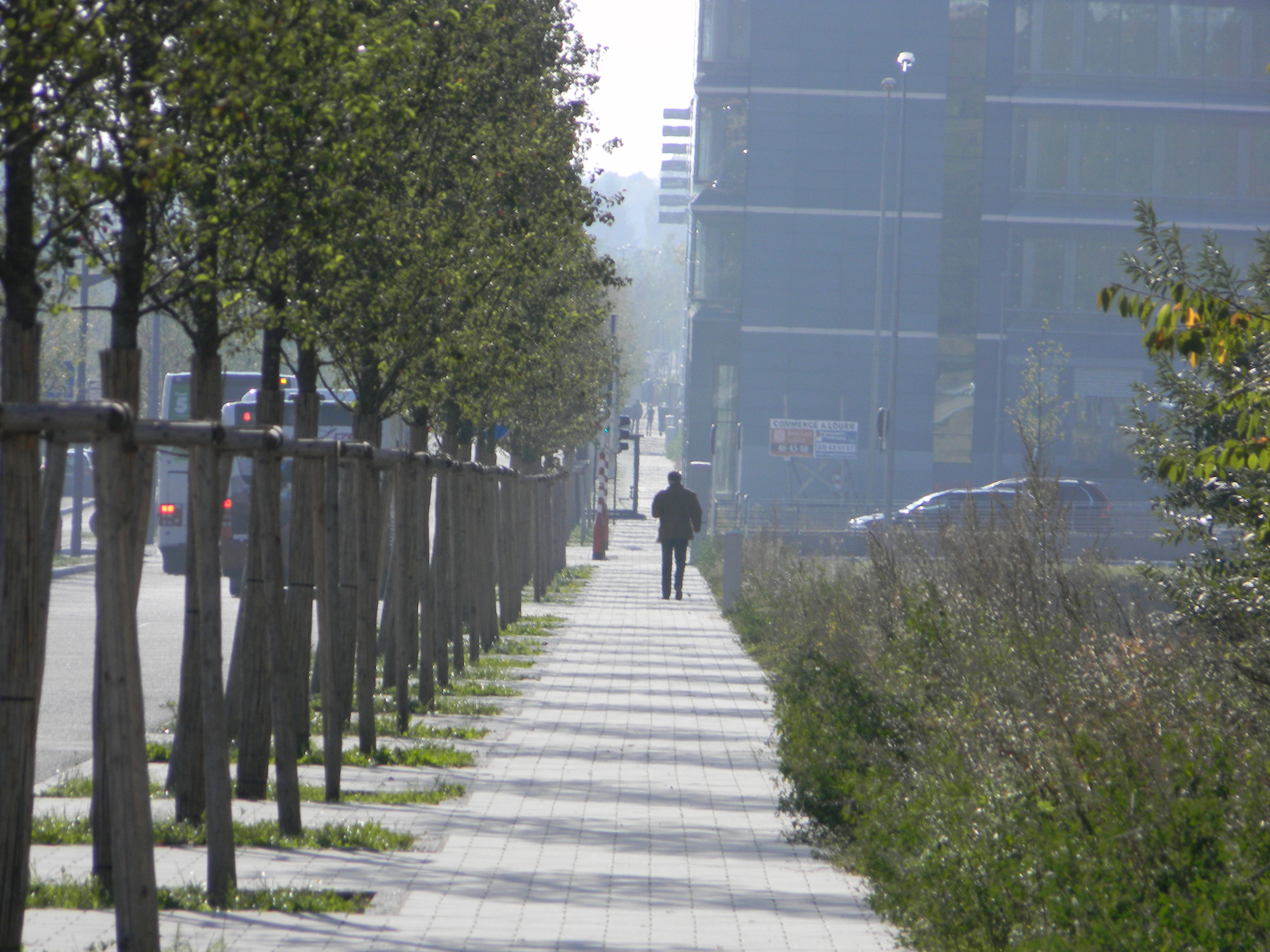
Avenue John-F.-Kennedy in Luxembourg City

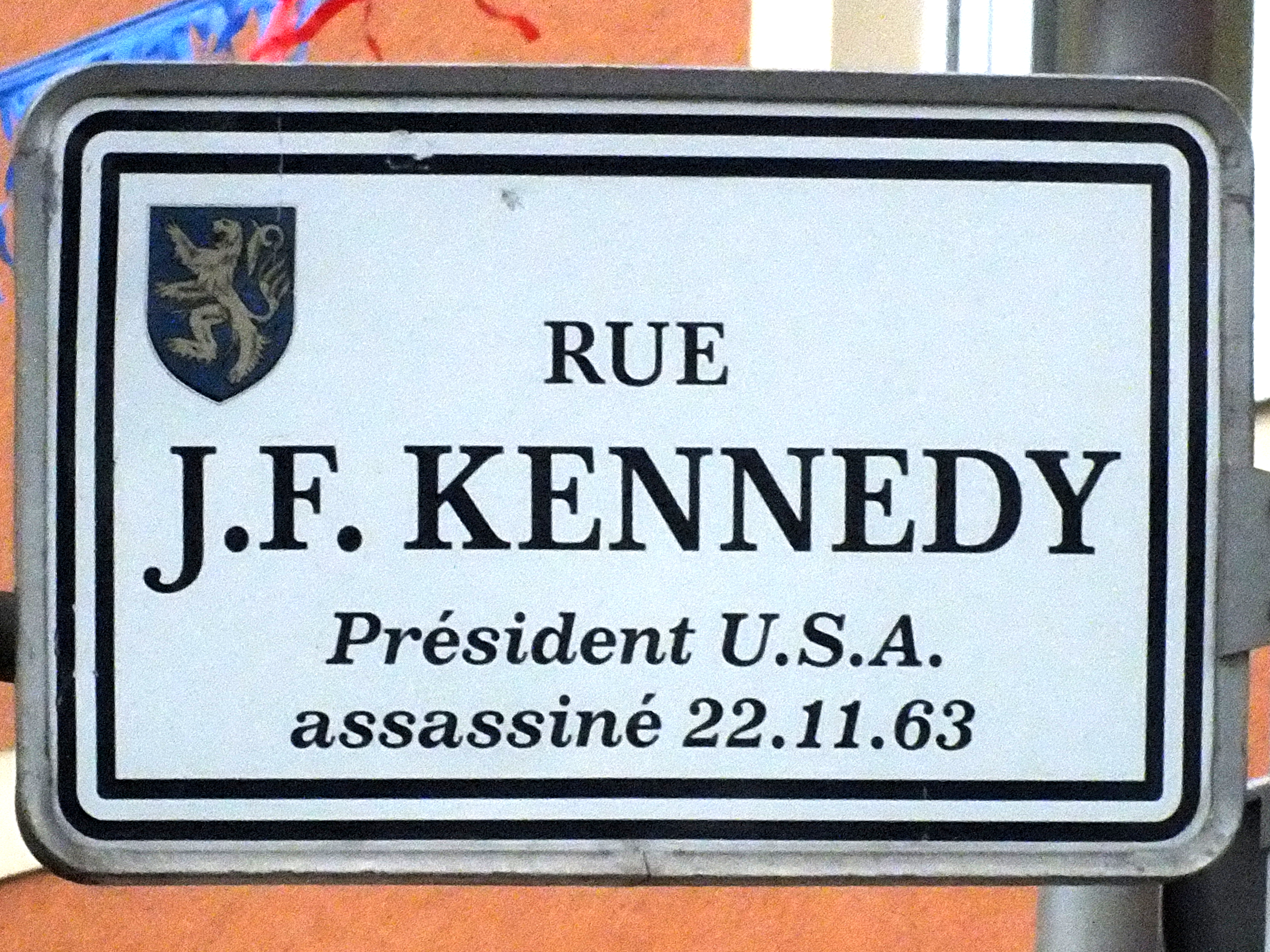
Sign on Rue John F. Kennedy in Differdange

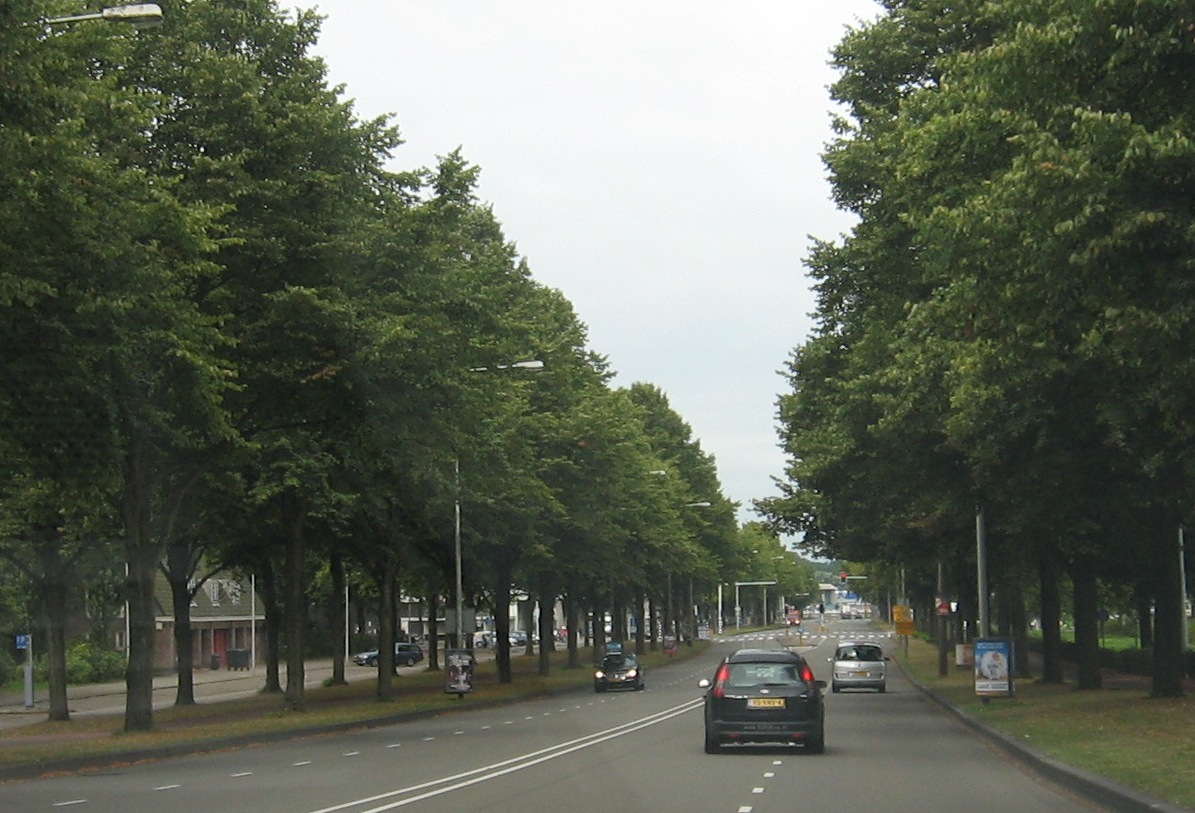
President Kennedylaan in Amsterdam

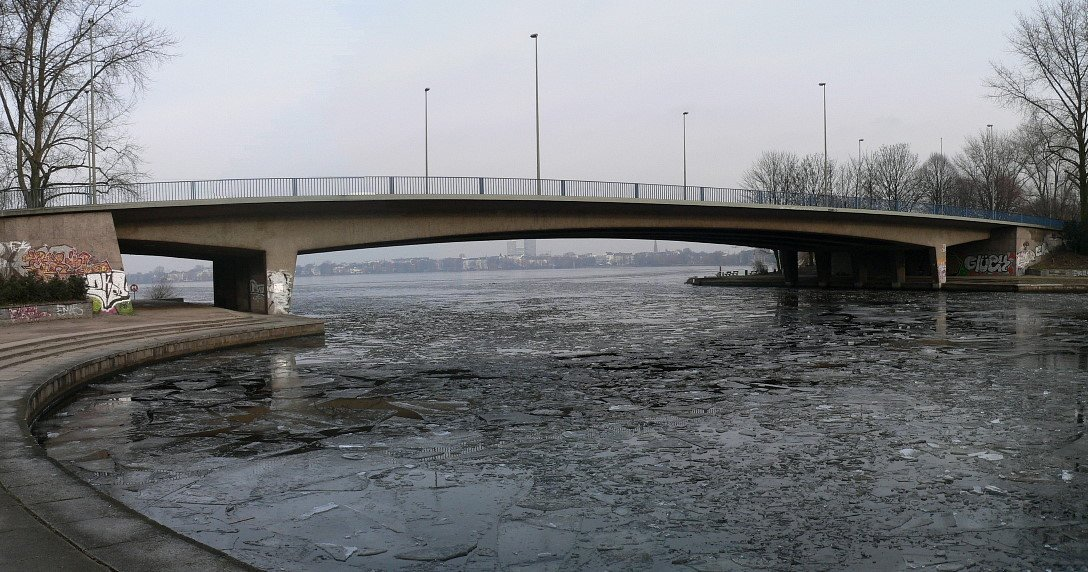
Kennedybrücke in Hamburg

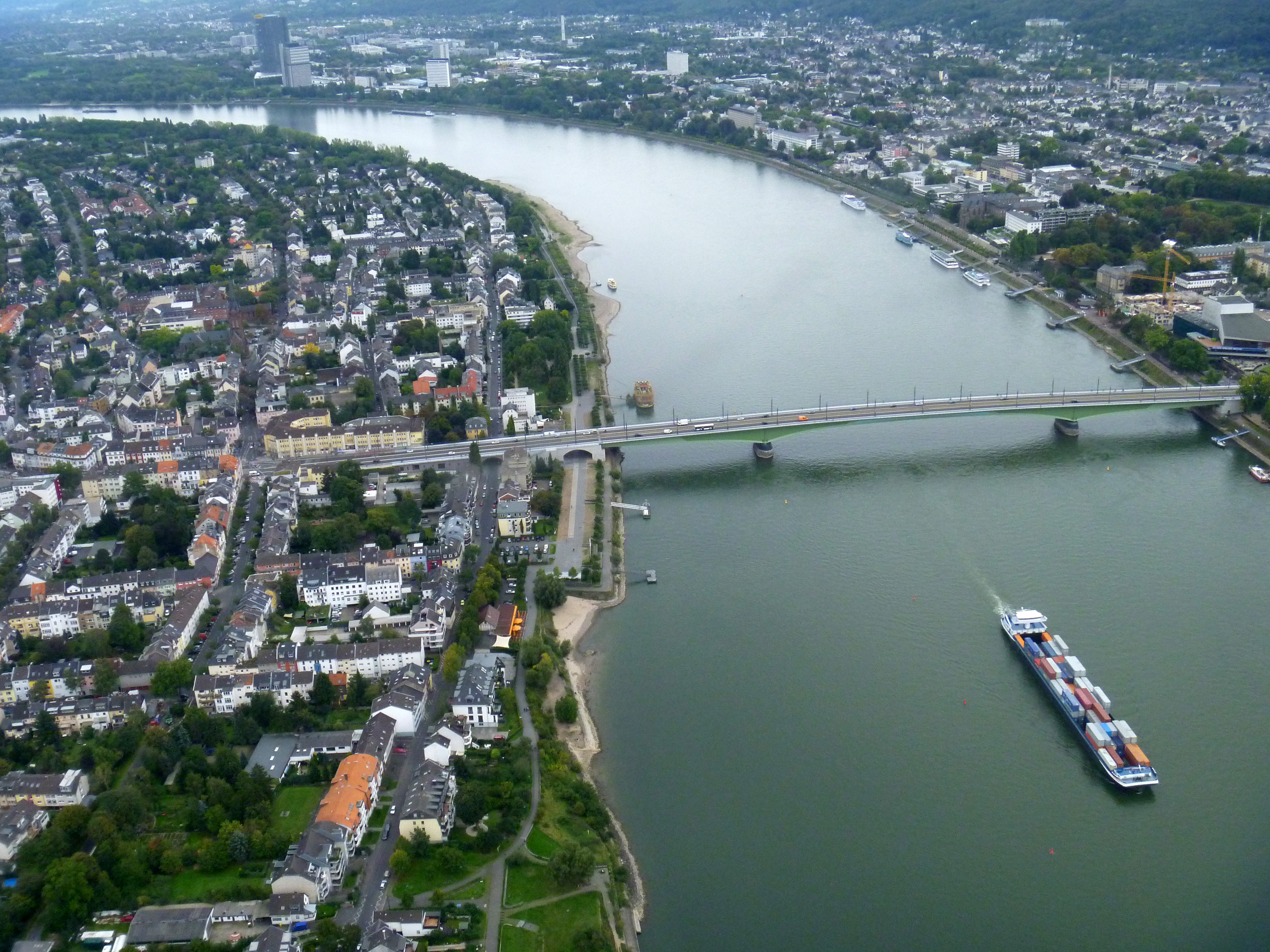
Kennedybrücke in Bonn

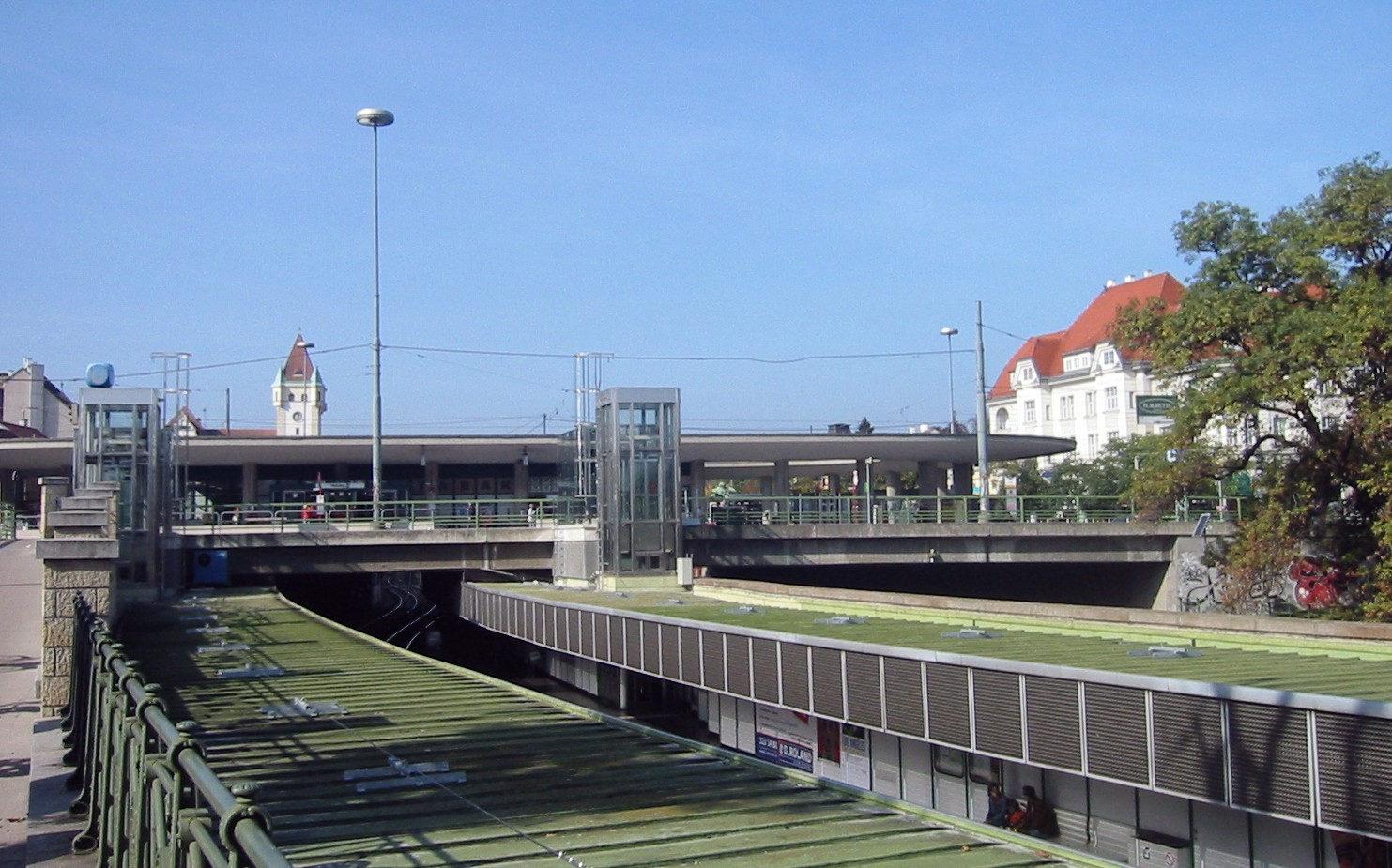
Kennedybrücke in Vienna

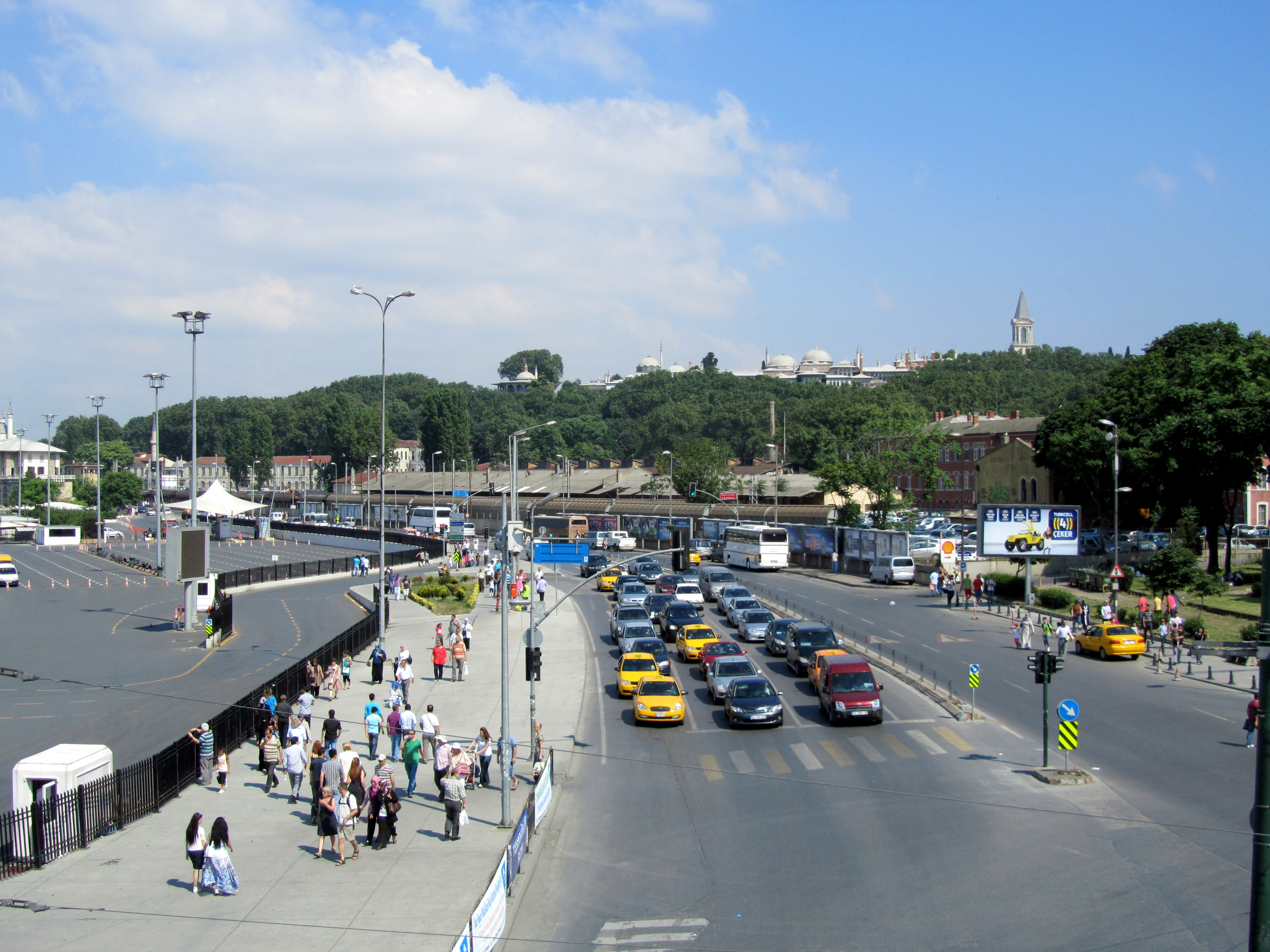
Kennedy Caddesi in Istanbul

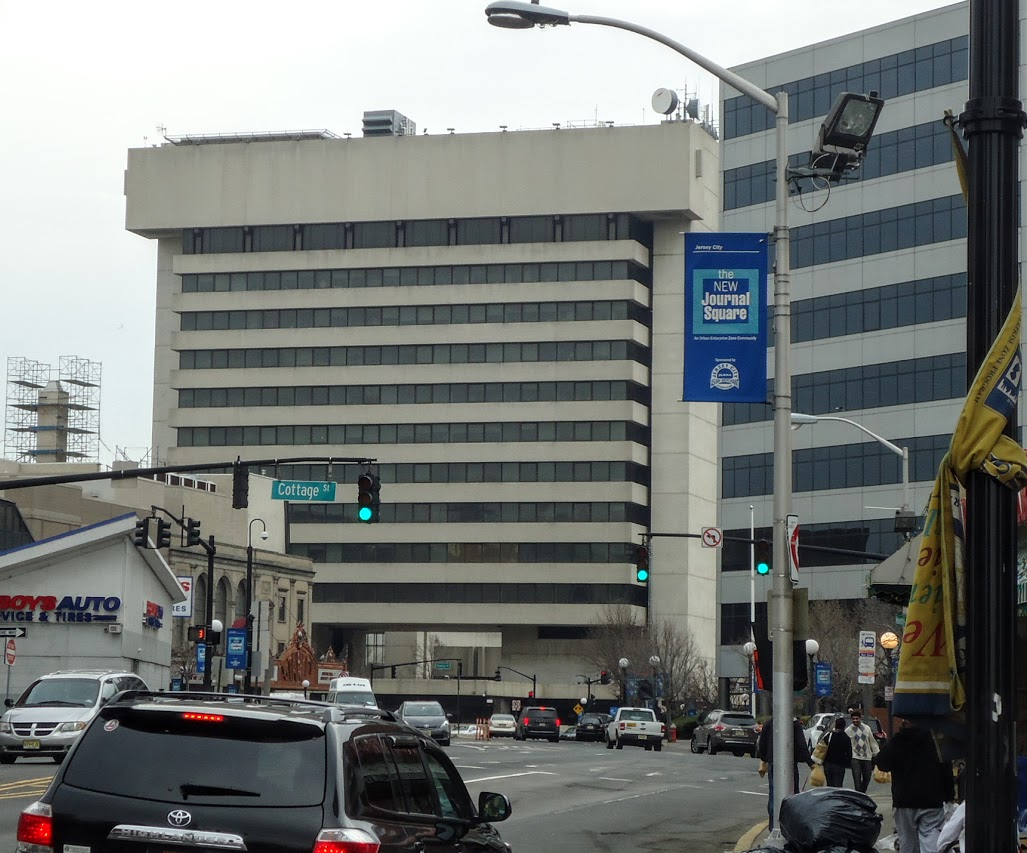
John F. Kennedy Boulevard, Jersey City

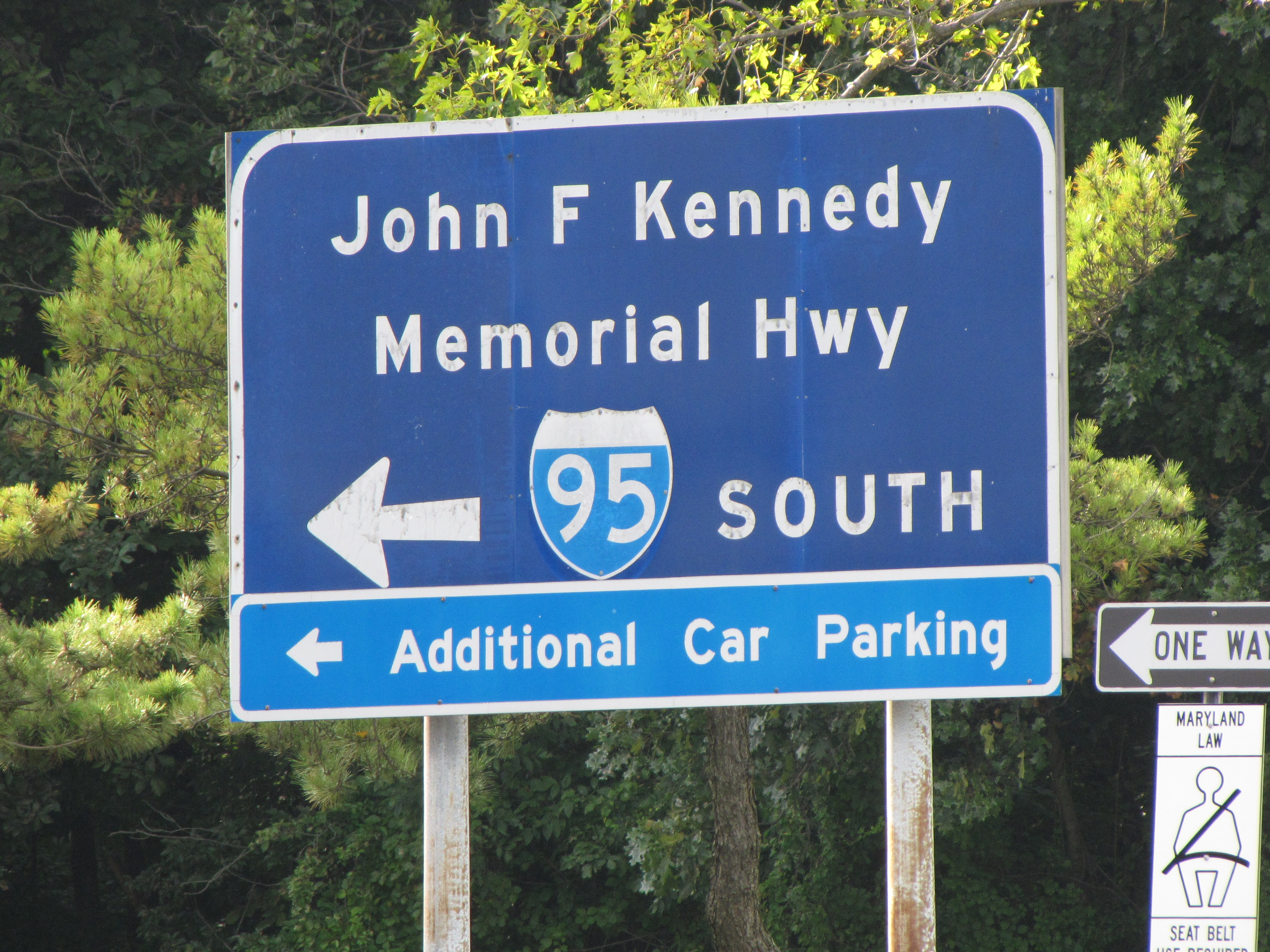
Sign on John F. Kennedy Memorial Highway, Maryland

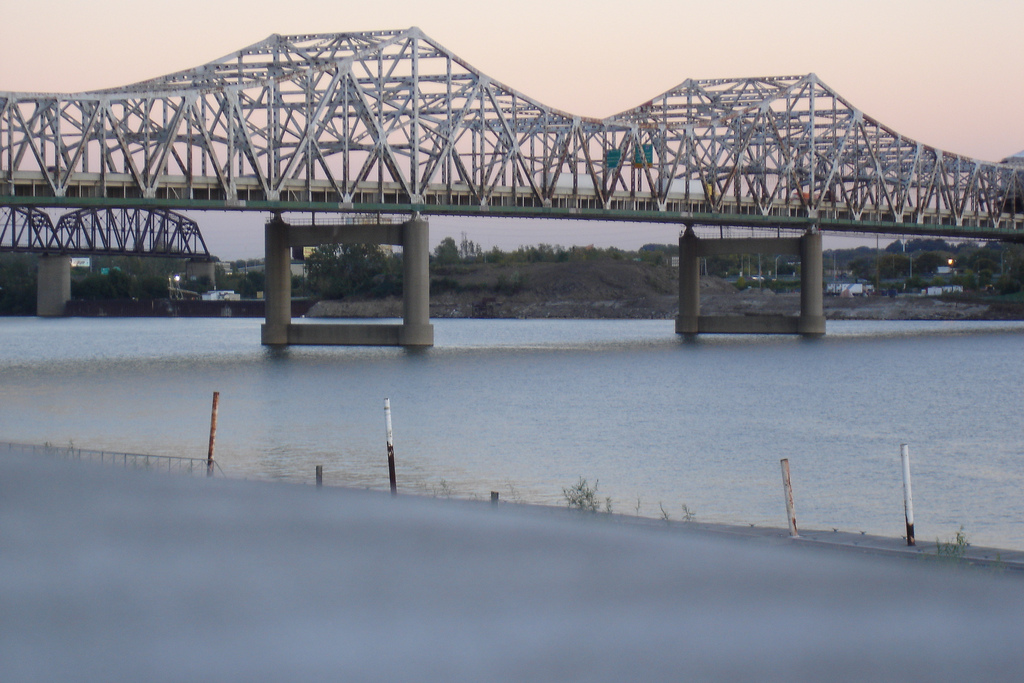
The John F. Kennedy Memorial Bridge linking Indiana with Kentucky

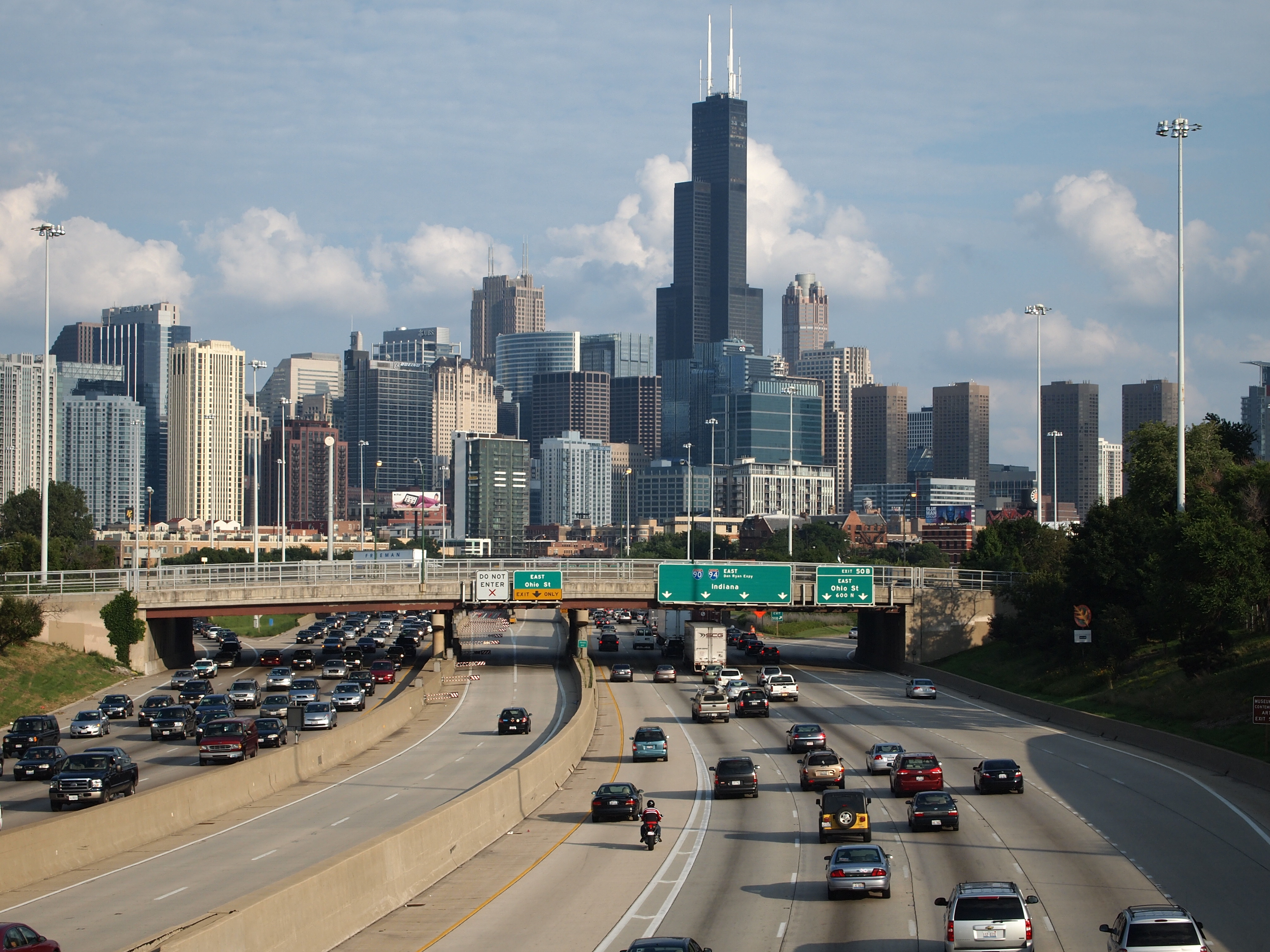
Kennedy Expressway, Chicago

=== Africa ===
==== Burkina Faso ====
- Avenue John F. Kennedy, a street in Ouagadougou

==== Niger ====
- Kennedy Bridge, a bridge across the Niger River in Niamey

==== Mauritius ====
- John Kennedy Avenue, a street in Vacoas-Phoenix
- John Kennedy Street, a street in Pamplemousses
- John Kennedy Street, a street in Port Louis
- John Kennedy Street, a street in Roche Terre

==== Morocco ====
- Avenue John Kennedy (John Kennedy Avenue), a street in Kénitra
- Avenue John Kennedy (John Kennedy Avenue), a street in Safi

==== South Africa ====
- John F Kennedy Street, a street in Hartbeesfontein

==== Zambia ====
- President Kennedy Street, a street in Kalulushi

=== Asia ===
==== Lebanon ====
- Rue John Kennedy, a street in Beirut, was named in honor of President John F. Kennedy on November 30, 1963.

==== Iran ====
- Kennedy Square was the name of a square in Tehran, which was renamed Tohid Square after the Revolution of 1979.

==== Israel ====
- Kennedy Street, Netanya

=== Europe ===
==== Austria ====
- Kennedybrücke (Kennedy Bridge), a bridge in Vienna, finished in 1964 and named after John F. Kennedy, who met Nikita Khrushchev in Vienna in 1961.

==== Belgium ====
- Avenue John Kennedy (John Kennedy Avenue), a street in Brussels
- J. F. Kennedylaan, a street in Sterrebeek
- John Kennedylaan, a street in Ghent
- Boulevard John Fitzgerald Kennedy, a street in Mons
- John Kennedylaan, a street in Ranst
- John F. Kennedylaan, a street in Zelzate
- John F. Kennedystraat, a street in As
- John F. Kennedystraat, a street in Ingelmunster
- Kennedylaan, a street in De Haan
- Kennedylaan, a street in Grobbendonk
- Kennedylaan, a street in Herentals
- Kennedylaan, a street in Sint-Truiden
- Kennedylaan, a street in Ypres
- Kennedytunnel, one of the busiest highway tunnels in Europe, built in the 1960s in Antwerp, and named after President Kennedy
- President J.F. Kennedykaai, a wharf in Bruges
- President J.F. Kennedylaan, a street in Vilvoorde
- President Kennedylaan, a street in Izegem
- President Kennedylaan, a street in Kortrijk
- President Kennedypark, a business park in Kortrijk
- Rue du Président John Fitzgerald Kennedy (President John Fitzgerald Kennedy Street), a street in Aiseau-Presles

==== Cyprus ====
- John Kennedy Avenue, a street in Nicosia

==== France ====
- Avenue John Fitzgerald Kennedy (John Fitzgerald Kennedy Avenue), a street in Mérignac
- Avenue John-Kennedy (John Kennedy Avenue), formerly Avenue de Paris, a street in Boulogne-sur-Mer
- Avenue du Président John Kennedy (President John Kennedy Avenue), a street in Saint-Malo
- Avenue du Président John Fitzgerald Kennedy (President John Fitzgerald Kennedy Avenue), a street in Saint-Germain-en-Laye
- Avenue du Président-Kennedy (President Kennedy Avenue), a street in Béthune
- Avenue du Président-Kennedy (President Kennedy Avenue), a street in Lille
- Avenue du Président-Kennedy (President Kennedy Avenue), formerly Quai du Fossé, a street in Mulhouse
- Avenue du Président-Kennedy (President Kennedy Avenue), formerly Quai de Passy, a street running alongside the Seine in Paris, in the 16th arrondissement
- Avenue du Président-Kennedy (President Kennedy Avenue), a street in Roquebrune-Cap-Martin
- Avenue Président John Kennedy (President John Kennedy Avenue), a street in Dijon
- Avenue Président-Kennedy (President Kennedy Avenue), a street in Dreux
- Avenue Président-Kennedy (President Kennedy Avenue), a street in Narbonne
- Avenue Président-Kennedy (President Kennedy Avenue), a street in Neufchâteau
- Avenue Président-Kennedy (President Kennedy Avenue), a street in Soissons
- Avenue Président-Kennedy (President Kennedy Avenue), a street in Orléans
- Boulevard John Fitzgerald Kennedy (John Fitzgerald Kennedy Boulevard), a street in Clermont-Ferrand
- Boulevard John Kennedy (John Kennedy Boulevard), a street in Bourg-en-Bresse
- Boulevard John Kennedy (John Kennedy Boulevard), a street in Corbeil-Essonnes
- Boulevard John Kennedy (John Kennedy Boulevard), a street in Dijon
- Boulevard John Kennedy (John Kennedy Boulevard), a street in Draguignan
- Boulevard John Kennedy (John Kennedy Boulevard), a street in Vichy
- Boulevard du Président-Kennedy (President Kennedy Boulevard), a street in Sens
- Boulevard Président-Kennedy (President Kennedy Boulevard), a street in Aix-en-Provence
- Boulevard Président-Kennedy (President Kennedy Boulevard), a street in Béziers
- Corniche Président John F. Kennedy, formerly Promenade de la Corniche, a street in Marseille, running along the sea front in the 7th and 8th arrondissements
- Cours John Kennedy (John Kennedy Walk), a street in Nantes
- Promenade J. Fitzgerald Kennedy (J.Fitzgerald Kennedy Promenade), formerly Boulevard de l'Atlantique, a promenade in Les Sables-d'Olonne
- Rue J. F. Kennedy (J. F. Kennedy Street), formerly Rue Jeanne d'Arc, a street in Metz
- Rue du Président John Fitzgerald Kennedy (President John Fitzgerald Kennedy Street), a street in Roanne
- Rue du Président Kennedy (President Kennedy Street), formerly Rue de Cambrai, a street in Saint-Quentin
- Rue John Kennedy (John Kennedy Street), a street in Grenoble
- Rue John F Kennedy, a street in Paimpol
- Rue John-Fitzgerald-Kennedy, a street in Toulouse

==== Germany ====
- John-F.-Kennedy-Brücke (John F. Kennedy Bridge), a bridge over the Isar in Munich, formerly Herzog-Heinrich-Brücke, renamed in 1964
- Kennedybrücke (Kennedy Bridge), a bridge over the Rhine in Bonn
- Kennedybrücke (Kennedy Bridge), a bridge in Bremerhaven, completed in 1961 and named after Kennedy following his assassination.
- Kennedybrücke (Kennedy Bridge), a bridge in Hamburg, between the Binnenalster and Außenalster. Completed in 1953 and originally named Neue Lombardsbrücke, it was renamed Kennedybrücke after the assassination in 1963.
- Kennedystraße (Kennedy Street), a street in Amberg
- Kennedystraße (Kennedy Street), a street in Cologne, location of the Cologne Bonn Airport
- Kennedystraße (Kennedy Street), a street in Bergheim
- Kennedystraße (Kennedy Street), a street in Maintal
- Kennedystraße (Kennedy Street), a street in Oldenburg
- Kennedystraße (Kennedy Street), a street in Puchheim
- Kennedyallee (Kennedy Avenue), a street in Frankfurt am Main
- John F Kennedy Allee, a street in Pattonville

==== Greece ====
- Τζων Κέννεντυ (John Kennedy), an avenue in Thessaloniki

==== Ireland ====
- John F Kennedy Avenue, a street in Dublin
- John F Kennedy Drive, a street in Dublin
- John F Kennedy Road, a street in Dublin
- John F. Kennedy Arboretum, a park in Wexford

==== Italy ====
- Corso John Fitzgerald Kennedy (John Fitzgerald Kennedy Street), a street in Rivoli
- Ponte John Fitzgerald Kennedy (John Fitzgerald Kennedy Bridge), a main bridge in Lecco
- Via John Fitzgerald Kennedy (John Fitzgerald Kennedy Street), a street in Caserta
- Via John Fitzgerald Kennedy (John Fitzgerald Kennedy Street), a street in Cosenza
- Via John Fitzgerald Kennedy (John Fitzgerald Kennedy Street), a street in Ferrara
- Via John Fitzgerald Kennedy (John Fitzgerald Kennedy Street), a street in Imola
- Via John Fitzgerald Kennedy (John Fitzgerald Kennedy Street), a street in Naples
- Via John Fitzgerald Kennedy (John Fitzgerald Kennedy Street), a street in Parma
- Via John Fitzgerald Kennedy (John Fitzgerald Kennedy Street), a street in Recale
- Via John Fitzgerald Kennedy (John Fitzgerald Kennedy Street), a street in Salerno
- Via Presidente Kennedy (President Kennedy Street), a street in Pozzallo
- Viale Presidente Kennedy (President Kennedy Avenue), a street in Catania

==== Luxembourg ====
- Avenue John F. Kennedy (John F. Kennedy Avenue), a street in Luxembourg
- Rue J. F. Kennedy (John F. Kennedy Street), a street in Differdange

==== North Macedonia ====
- John F. Kennedy Street, a street in Skopje, Republic of North Macedonia

==== Monaco ====
- Avenue Président J. F. Kennedy (President J. F. Kennedy Avenue), a street in Monaco, near Port Hercule

==== Netherlands ====
- John F. Kennedylaan (John F. Kennedy Avenue), a street in Apeldoorn
- John F. Kennedylaan (John F. Kennedy Avenue), a street in Baarn
- John F. Kennedylaan (John F. Kennedy Avenue), a street in Breda
- John F. Kennedylaan (John F. Kennedy Avenue), a street in Eindhoven
- John F. Kennedylaan (John F. Kennedy Avenue), a street in Heerlen
- John F. Kennedylaan (John F. Kennedy Avenue), a street in Rijswijk
- John F. Kennedylaan (John F. Kennedy Avenue), a street in Rotterdam
- John F. Kennedylaan (John F. Kennedy Avenue), a street in Valkenswaard
- John F. Kennedylaan (John F. Kennedy Avenue), a street in Vught
- John F. Kennedylaan (John F. Kennedy Avenue), a street in Helden
- President Kennedylaan (President Kennedy Avenue), a street in Akersloot
- President Kennedylaan (President Kennedy Avenue), a street in Amsterdam
- President Kennedylaan (President Kennedy Avenue), a street in Oegstgeest
- President Kennedylaan (President Kennedy Avenue), a street in Roosendaal
- Kennedystraat (Kennedy Street), a street in Berlicum
- Kennedystraat (Kennedy Street), a street in Drunen
- Kennedystraat (Kennedy Street), a street in Geleen
- Kennedystraat (Kennedy Street), a street in Hoensbroek
- Kennedystraat (Kennedy Street), a street in Liempde
- Kennedystraat (Kennedy Street), a street in Ulestraten

==== Serbia ====
- John Kennedy Street, a street in Zemun/Novi Beograd (runs through both municipalities) in north-west Belgrade, 1.45 km in length.

==== Spain ====
- Calle del Presidente Kennedy (President Kennedy Street), a street in Villafranca de los Barros
- Calle John Kennedy (John Kennedy Street), a street in Los Barrios
- Calle Kennedy (Kennedy Street), a street in Benidorm
- Calle Presidente Kennedy (President Kennedy Street), a street in Madrid (in the Getafe district)
- Carrer del President Kennedy (President Kennedy Street), a street in Banyoles
- Carrer del President Kennedy (President Kennedy Street), a street in Figueres

==== Turkey ====
- Kennedy Avenue, a major highway in Istanbul
- John F. Kennedy Street, a street in Ankara

==== United Kingdom ====
===== England =====
- John F Kennedy Court, a street in Wisbech
- John F. Kennedy Estate, a street in Washington, near Washington Old Hall
- John F Kennedy Gardens, a street in Derby
- John Kennedy Court, a street in London
- John Kennedy Road, a road in Mottram in Longdendale
- Kennedy Drive, a road in Stapleford, Nottinghamshire

===== Scotland =====
- John Kennedy Drive, a street in Thurso
- John Kennedy Place, a street in Kilmarnock
- President Kennedy Drive, a street in Stirling

=== North America ===
==== Bahamas ====
- John F. Kennedy Drive, a major roadway in New Providence

==== Barbados ====
- President Kennedy Drive, a major roadway in Bridgetown linking the Bridgetown Port with the Spring Garden Highway (also location of the Kensington Oval stadium)

==== Canada ====
- President Kennedy Avenue, a street in Montreal, Quebec. Kennedy was a popular figure in predominantly Roman Catholic Quebec, and was honored with a street in Montreal
- Route-du-Président-Kennedy, the official name of Quebec Route 173, a major north–south highway on the south shore of the St. Lawrence River in Quebec, Canada. This road is also known as the old path from Québec city to Boston
- Rue John-F.-Kennedy (John F. Kennedy Street), a street in LaSalle, Quebec
- Rue John-F.-Kennedy (John F. Kennedy Street), a street in Terrebonne, Quebec built in 1966 a few years after his assassination
- Rue John-F.-Kennedy (John F. Kennedy Street), a street in Quebec City
- Ecole secondaire John F. Kennedy (John F. Kennedy High School), a school in Montreal, Quebec

==== Curaçao ====
- John F. Kennedy Boulevard, a major roadway that runs through the capital city of Willemstad

==== Dominican Republic ====
- Avenida John F. Kennedy (John F. Kennedy Avenue), a major roadway in Santo Domingo

==== Mexico ====
===== CDMX (including Mexico State) =====
- Avenida John F. Kennedy (John F. Kennedy Avenue), a street in Mexico city
- Calle John F. Kennedy (John F. Kennedy Street), a street in Mexico City
- Calle John F. Kennedy (John F. Kennedy Street), a street in Nezahualcóyotl
- Calle John F. Kennedy (John F. Kennedy Street), a street in Xonacatlán

===== Tlaxcala =====
- Privada John F. Kennedy (John F. Kennedy Lane), a street in Tlaxcala

==== United States ====
===== California =====
- John F. Kennedy Drive, a street in Moreno Valley
- John F. Kennedy Drive, a street in Riverside
- John F. Kennedy Drive and the John F. Kennedy Promenade, a street and a car-free path in San Francisco's Golden Gate Park

===== Delaware =====
- John F. Kennedy Memorial Highway, a stretch of Interstate 95 in Delaware along the Delaware Turnpike, running from the Maryland border, where the John F. Kennedy Memorial Highway continues south to Baltimore, north to Newport. The road had been dedicated by President Kennedy on November 14, 1963, eight days before his assassination.

===== Florida =====
- John F. Kennedy Boulevard (State Road 60) in Tampa, renamed for Kennedy in 1964 by unanimous vote of the Tampa City Council. Kennedy visited Tampa on November 18, 1963, four days before his assassination.
- John F. Kennedy Causeway, a major causeway in Miami

===== Illinois =====
- John F. Kennedy Expressway, a major expressway in Chicago, renamed for Kennedy by unanimous vote of Chicago City Council a few days after the president's assassination

===== Indiana =====
- John F. Kennedy Memorial Bridge, carries Interstate 65 across the Ohio River between Louisville, Kentucky and Jeffersonville, Indiana. The soon-to-be completed span was named in Kennedy's honor four days after his death.

===== Kentucky =====
- John F. Kennedy Memorial Bridge, carries Interstate 65 across the Ohio River between Louisville, Kentucky and Jeffersonville, Indiana. The soon-to-be completed span was named in Kennedy's honor four days after his death.

===== Maine =====
- Kennedy Memorial Drive, formerly known as the Oakland Road, runs from the end of Silver Street in Waterville, Maine to the center of town in Oakland, Maine. The roadway was under reconstruction from two lanes to four during the time of Kennedy's assassination. The upgraded roadway was dedicated in his honor.

===== Maryland =====
- John F. Kennedy Drive, a street in Hagerstown
- John F. Kennedy Memorial Highway, a stretch of Interstate 95 in Maryland, running from Baltimore to the Delaware border, where it becomes the Delaware Turnpike, which is also the John F. Kennedy Memorial Highway. The road was formerly called the Northeast Expressway. The road had been dedicated by President Kennedy on November 14, 1963, eight days before his assassination.

===== Massachusetts =====
- John F. Kennedy Street, formerly Boylston Street, which runs from Harvard Square to the Charles River in Cambridge
- John F. Kennedy Memorial Highway, a segment of Massachusetts Route 18 stretching from I-195 to its southern terminus in New Bedford, Massachusetts

===== Nebraska =====
- Kennedy Freeway, a 20-mile portion of US Route 75 that runs between southern Omaha and Bellevue

===== New Jersey =====
- John F. Kennedy Beach Drive, a street in North Wildwood
- John F. Kennedy Boulevard in Hudson County, New Jersey, a county highway in New Jersey which starts at the Route 440/Bayonne Bridge junction in Bayonne, making its way north to Route 63 in North Bergen.
- John F. Kennedy Boulevard, a street in Lawnside
- John F. Kennedy Boulevard, a street in Sea Isle City
- John F. Kennedy Boulevard, a street in Somerset
- John F. Kennedy Boulevard East in Hudson County, New Jersey, a two-way, mostly two lane, scenic thoroughfare in the North Hudson, New Jersey municipalities of Weehawken, West New York, Guttenberg and North Bergen.
- John F. Kennedy Drive, a street in Bloomfield
- John F. Kennedy Drive, a street in Middlesex
- John F. Kennedy Memorial Bridge, a bridge over the Intracoastal Waterway between Egg Harbor Township and Longport
- John F. Kennedy Parkway, a street in Millburn and Livingston
- John F. Kennedy Way, a street in Willingboro

===== New York =====
- John F. Kennedy Boulevard, a street in Blauvelt
- John F. Kennedy Drive, a street in Stony Point
- John F. Kennedy Memorial, a statue in Grand Army Plaza

===== Pennsylvania =====
- John F. Kennedy Boulevard in Philadelphia, formerly Pennsylvania Boulevard, which runs from 30th Street Station to City Hall at Broad Street.
- John F. Kennedy Boulevard Bridge, in Philadelphia, a bridge that carries John F. Kennedy Boulevard over the Schuylkill River
- John F. Kennedy Drive, a street in Upland

===== Texas =====
- John F. Kennedy Boulevard in Houston, an expressway that connects Beltway 8 (Sam Houston Parkway) to the main terminals of George Bush Intercontinental Airport.
- John F. Kennedy Memorial Causeway, formerly The North Padre Island Causeway, connecting Padre Island to the Texas mainland.
- John Kennedy Way, a street in El Paso

==== Puerto Rico ====
- Calle Kennedy (Kennedy Street), a street in Arecibo
- Calle Kennedy (Kennedy Street), a street in Dorado
- Calle John F. Kennedy (John F. Kennedy Street), a street in Caguas
- Calle John F. Kennedy (John F. Kennedy Street), a street in Las Piedras
- John F. Kennedy Expressway, a segment of Puerto Rico state road (PR-2) in San Juan.

=== Oceania ===
==== Australia ====
===== South Australia =====
- John F Kennedy Memorial Garden, a park in Beulah Park

===== Victoria =====
- John F Kennedy Memorial, in Treasury Gardens, Melbourne

==== New Zealand ====
- John F Kennedy Drive, a street in Palmerston North.
- John F Kennedy Place, a street in Glen Eden, Auckland.

=== South America ===
==== Bolivia ====
- Calle Kennedy (Kennedy Street), a street in Oruro

==== Brazil ====
===== Acre =====
- Travessa Presidente Kennedy (President Kennedy Lane), a street in Feijó

===== Amazonas =====
- Avenida Presidente Kennedy (President Kennedy Avenue), a street in Manaus
- Rua Presidente Kennedy (President Kennedy Street), a street in Manaus

===== Bahia =====
- Avenida Presidente Kennedy (President Kennedy Avenue), a street in Itabuna
- Avenida Presidente Kennedy (President Kennedy Avenue), a street in Prado
- Rua Presidente Kennedy (President Kennedy Street), a street in Candeias
- Rua Presidente Kennedy (President Kennedy Street), a street in Salvador
- Rua Presidente Kennedy (President Kennedy Street), a street in Santo Amaro

===== Espírito Santo =====
- Avenida Presidente Kennedy (President Kennedy Avenue), a street in Colatina
- Avenida Presidente Kennedy (President Kennedy Avenue), a street in Guarapari
- Avenida Presidente Kennedy (President Kennedy Avenue), a street in Linhares
- Avenida Presidente Kennedy (President Kennedy Avenue), a street in Montanha
- Avenida Presidente Kennedy (President Kennedy Avenue), a street in Serra
- Rua Presidente John Kennedy (President John Kennedy Street), a street in Vila Velha

===== Goiás =====
- Avenida Presidente Kennedy (President Kennedy Avenue), a street in Anápolis
- Avenida Presidente Kennedy (President Kennedy Avenue), a street in Edéia
- Avenida Presidente Kennedy (President Kennedy Avenue), a street in Jaraguá
- Avenida Presidente Kennedy (President Kennedy Avenue), a street in Mineiros
- Avenida Presidente Kennedy (President Kennedy Avenue), a street in São Francisco de Goiás
- Rua Presidente Kennedy (President Kennedy Street), a street in Guapó
- Rua Presidente Kennedy (President Kennedy Street), a street in Inhumas
- Rua Presidente Kennedy (President Kennedy Street), a street in Iporá
- Rua Presidente Kennedy (President Kennedy Street), a street in Jataí
- Rua Presidente Kennedy (President Kennedy Street), a street in Rio Verde

===== Maranhão =====
- Avenida Presidente Kennedy (President Kennedy Avenue), a street in Lago Verde
- Avenida Presidente Kennedy (President Kennedy Avenue), a street in Poção de Pedras
- Rua Presidente Kennedy (President Kennedy Street), a street in Bacuri
- Rua Presidente Kennedy (President Kennedy Street), a street in Bela Vista do Maranhão
- Rua Presidente Kennedy (President Kennedy Street), a street in Caxias
- Rua Presidente Kennedy (President Kennedy Street), a street in Mirinzal

===== Mato Grosso do Sul =====
- Rua Presidente Kennedy (President Kennedy Street), a street in Dourados

===== Minas Gerais =====
- Avenida Presidente Kennedy (President Kennedy Avenue), a street in Janaúba
- Avenida Presidente Kennedy (President Kennedy Avenue), a street in Lagoa Santa
- Avenida Presidente Kennedy (President Kennedy Avenue), a street in Montes Claros
- Avenida Presidente Kennedy (President Kennedy Avenue), a street in Nova Lima
- Avenida Presidente Kennedy (President Kennedy Avenue), a street in Uberlândia
- Rua Presidente John Kennedy (President John Kennedy Street), a street in Palma
- Rua Presidente John Kennedy (President John Kennedy Street), a street in Três Marias
- Rua Presidente John Kennedy (President John Kennedy Street), a street in Uberaba
- Rua Presidente Kennedy (President Kennedy Street), a street in Brumadinho
- Rua Presidente Kennedy (President Kennedy Street), a street in Buritizeiro
- Rua Presidente Kennedy (President Kennedy Street), a street in Contagem
- Rua Presidente Kennedy (President Kennedy Street), a street in Gonzaga
- Rua Presidente Kennedy (President Kennedy Street), a street in Itabirito
- Rua Presidente Kennedy (President Kennedy Street), a street in Nova União
- Rua Presidente Kennedy (President Kennedy Street), a street in Pedro Leopoldo
- Rua Presidente Kennedy (President Kennedy Street), a street in São José da Lapa

===== Pará =====
- Avenida Presidente Kennedy (President Kennedy Avenue), a street in Parauapebas
- Rua Presidente Kennedy (President Kennedy Street), a street in Castanhal
- Rua Presidente Kennedy (President Kennedy Street), a street in Santarém

===== Paraíba =====
- Rua Presidente Kennedy (President Kennedy Street), a street in João Pessoa

===== Paraná =====
- Avenida Presidente Kennedy (President Kennedy Avenue), a street in Curitiba
- Avenida Presidente Kennedy (President Kennedy Avenue), a street in Dois Vizinhos
- Avenida Presidente Kennedy (President Kennedy Avenue), a street in Ponta Grossa
- Avenida Presidente Kennedy (President Kennedy Avenue), a street in São Sebastião da Amoreira
- Rua Presidente John Kennedy (President John Kennedy Street), a street in Jataízinho
- Rua Presidente Kennedy (President Kennedy Street), a street in Assis Chateaubriand
- Rua Presidente Kennedy (President Kennedy Street), a street in Cambé
- Rua Presidente Kennedy (President Kennedy Street), a street in Cascavel
- Rua Presidente Kennedy (President Kennedy Street), a street in Douradina
- Rua Presidente Kennedy (President Kennedy Street), a street in Matinhos
- Rua Presidente Kennedy (President Kennedy Street), a street in Nova Esperança
- Rua Presidente Kennedy (President Kennedy Street), a street in Pato Branco
- Rua Presidente Kennedy (President Kennedy Street), a street in Porecatu
- Rua Presidente Kennedy (President Kennedy Street), a street in Toledo

===== Pernambuco =====
- Avenida Presidente Kennedy (President Kennedy Avenue), a street in Recife
- Rua Presidente Kennedy (President Kennedy Street), a street in Jaboatão dos Guararapes
- Rua Presidente Kennedy (President Kennedy Street), a street in Olinda

===== Piauí =====
- Avenida Presidente Kennedy (President Kennedy Avenue), a street in Teresina
- Rua Presidente Kennedy (President Kennedy Street), a street in Miguel Leão

===== Rio de Janeiro =====
- Avenida Presidente John Kennedy (President John Kennedy Avenue), a street in Miguel Pereira
- Avenida Presidente Kennedy (President Kennedy Avenue), a street in Duque de Caxias
- Avenida Presidente Kennedy (President Kennedy Avenue), a street in São Gonçalo
- Avenida Presidente Kennedy (President Kennedy Avenue), a street in São João de Meriti
- Rua John Kennedy (John Kennedy Street), a street in Rio de Janeiro
- Rua Presidente Kennedy (President Kennedy Street), a street in Duque de Caxias
- Rua Presidente Kennedy (President Kennedy Street), a street in Nova Iguaçú
- Rua Presidente Kennedy (President Kennedy Street), a street in Valença
- Avenida Presidente Kennedy(President Kennedy Avenue), a street in Barra Mansa

===== Rio Grande do Norte =====
- Rua Presidente Kennedy (President Kennedy Street), a street in Caicó
- Rua Presidente Kennedy (President Kennedy Street), a street in Currais Novos
- Rua Presidente Kennedy (President Kennedy Street), a street in Mossoró
- Rua Presidente Kennedy (President Kennedy Street), a street in Natal

===== Rio Grande do Sul =====
- Rua John Kennedy (John Kennedy Street), a street in Flores da Cunha
- Rua Presidente Kennedy (President Kennedy Street), a street in Bom Jesus
- Rua Presidente Kennedy (President Kennedy Street), a street in Carlos Barbosa
- Rua Presidente Kennedy (President Kennedy Street), a street in Frederico Westphalen
- Rua Presidente Kennedy (President Kennedy Street), a street in Horizontina
- Rua Presidente Kennedy (President Kennedy Street), a street in Paraí
- Rua Presidente Kennedy (President Kennedy Street), a street in Sapiranga
- Rua Presidente Kennedy (President Kennedy Street), a street in Vacaria

===== Santa Catarina =====
- Avenida Presidente Kennedy (President Kennedy Avenue), a street in Lages
- Avenida Presidente Kennedy (President Kennedy Avenue), a street in São Carlos
- Avenida Presidente Kennedy (President Kennedy Avenue), a street in São José
- Rua John F Kennedy (John F Kennedy Street), a street in Chapecó
- Rua Presidente John Kennedy (President John Kennedy Street), a street in Blumenau
- Rua Presidente Kennedy (President Kennedy Street), a street in Criciúma
- Rua Presidente Kennedy (President Kennedy Street), a street in Joinville
- Rua Presidente Kennedy (President Kennedy Street), a street in Ouro

===== São Paulo =====
- Avenida Kennedy (Kennedy Avenue), a street in São Bernardo do Campo
- Avenida Presidente Kennedy (President Kennedy Avenue), a street in Barueri
- Avenida Presidente Kennedy (President Kennedy Avenue), a street in Caieiras
- Avenida Presidente Kennedy (President Kennedy Avenue), a street in Diadema
- Avenida Presidente Kennedy (President Kennedy Avenue), a street in Osasco
- Avenida Presidente Kennedy (President Kennedy Avenue), a street in Piracicaba
- Avenida Presidente Kennedy (President Kennedy Avenue), a street in Praia Grande
- Avenida Presidente Kennedy (President Kennedy Avenue), a street in Ribeirão Preto
- Avenida Presidente Kennedy (President Kennedy Avenue), a street in Rio Claro
- Avenida Presidente Kennedy (President Kennedy Avenue), a street in São Caetano do Sul
- Avenida Presidente Kennedy (President Kennedy Avenue), a street in Vargem Grande Paulista
- Rua John Kennedy (John Kennedy Street), a street in Ferraz de Vasconcelos
- Rua John Kennedy (John Kennedy Street), a street in Monte Alto
- Rua John Kennedy (John Kennedy Street), a street in Salto
- Rua John Kennedy (John Kennedy Street), a street in Vinhedo
- Rua John Kennedy (John Kennedy Street), a street in Votuporanga
- Avenida Presidente John F Kennedy (President John F Kennedy Avenue), a street in Águas de São Pedro. It was named by the municipal Law no. 227 of 4 February 1964, but the avenue was later renamed by the municipal Law no. 1,358 of 5 December 2006 as Avenida Ângelo Nogueira Vila (Ângelo Nogueira Vila Avenue).
- Rua Presidente John F Kennedy (President John F Kennedy Street), a street in Mogi Guaçú
- Rua Presidente Kennedy (President Kennedy Street), a street in Bauru
- Rua Presidente Kennedy (President Kennedy Street), a street in Descalvado
- Rua Presidente Kennedy (President Kennedy Street), a street in Franca
- Rua Presidente Kennedy (President Kennedy Street), a street in Guarujá
- Rua Presidente Kennedy (President Kennedy Street), a street in Itapira
- Rua Presidente Kennedy (President Kennedy Street), a street in Mogi Mirim
- Rua Presidente Kennedy (President Kennedy Street), a street in Paranapiacaba, Santo André

===== Tocantins =====
- Avenida Presidente John Kennedy (President John Kennedy Avenue), a street in Porto Nacional
- Avenida Presidente Kennedy (President Kennedy Avenue), a street in Araguaína
- Rua Presidente Kennedy (President Kennedy Street), a street in Augustinópolis
- Rua Presidente Kennedy (President Kennedy Street), a street in Sampaio

==== Chile ====
- Avenida Presidente Kennedy (President Kennedy Avenue), a street in Santiago de Chile

==== Ecuador ====
- Avenida John F. Kennedy, a street in Quito

==== Paraguay ====
- Calle John F. Kennedy, a street in Asunción

==== Peru ====
- Calle John F. Kennedy (John F. Kennedy Street), a street in Trujillo

== Parks, plazas, and squares ==
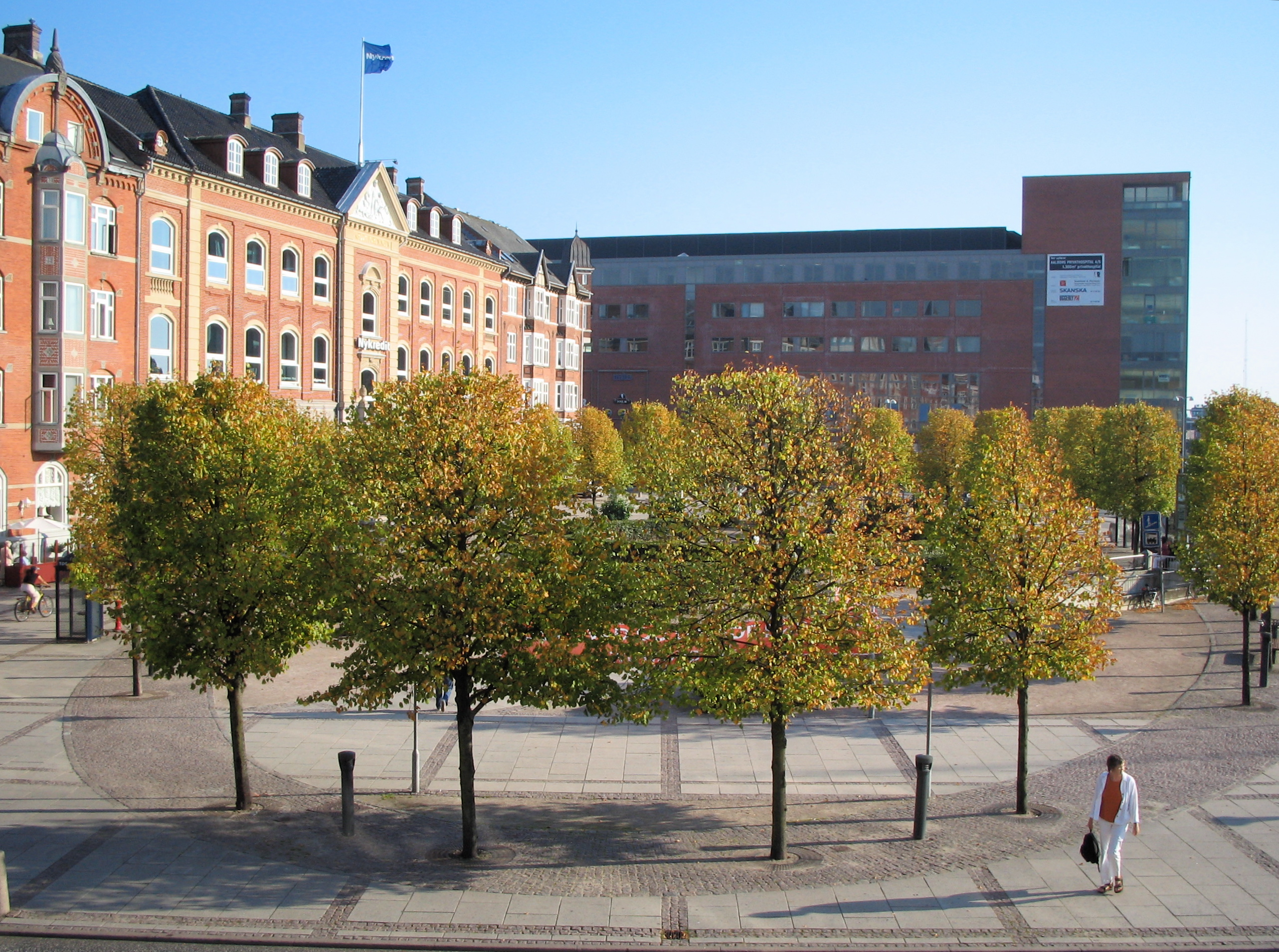
John F. Kennedy Plads in Aalborg

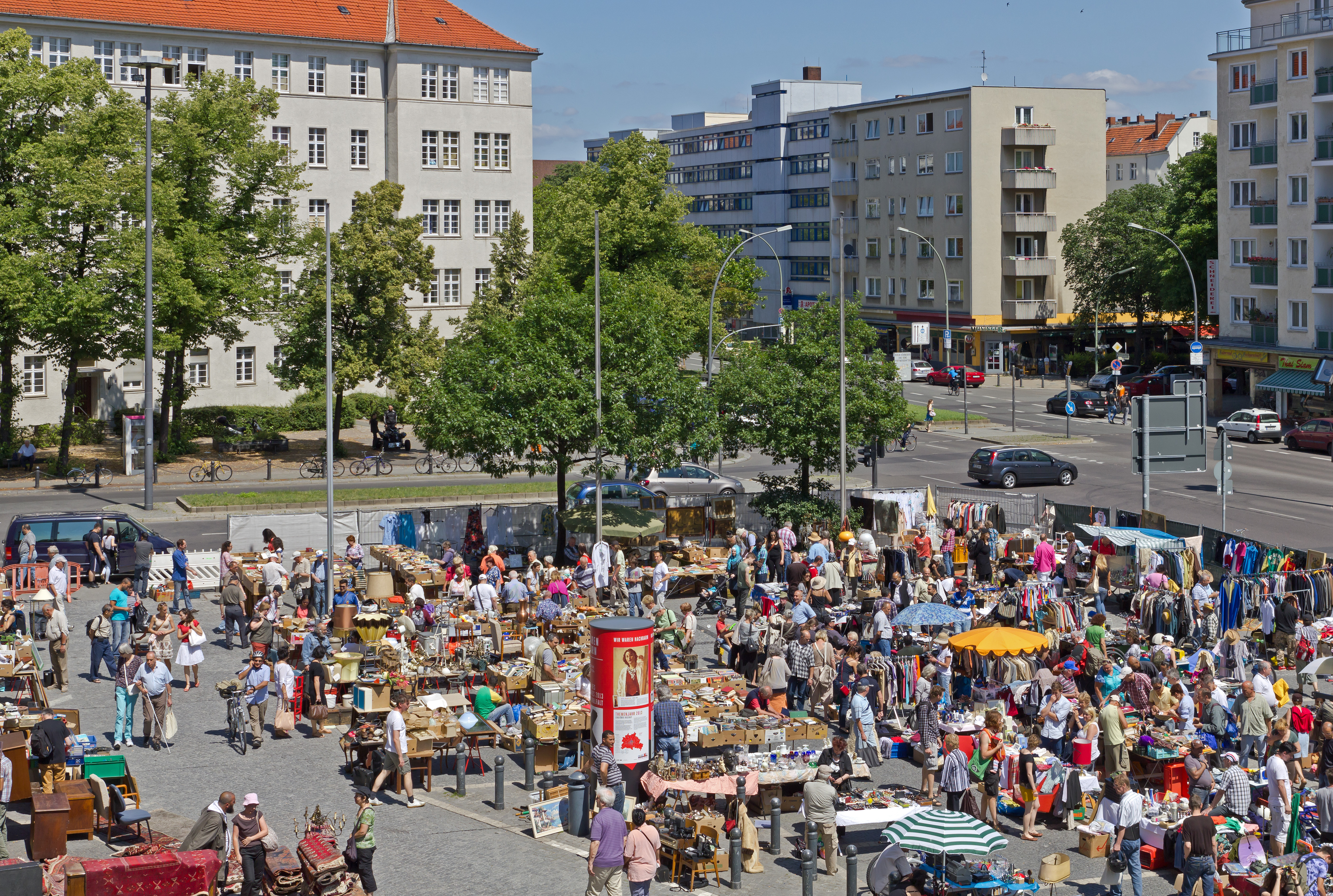
John-F.-Kennedy-Platz in Schöneberg, Berlin

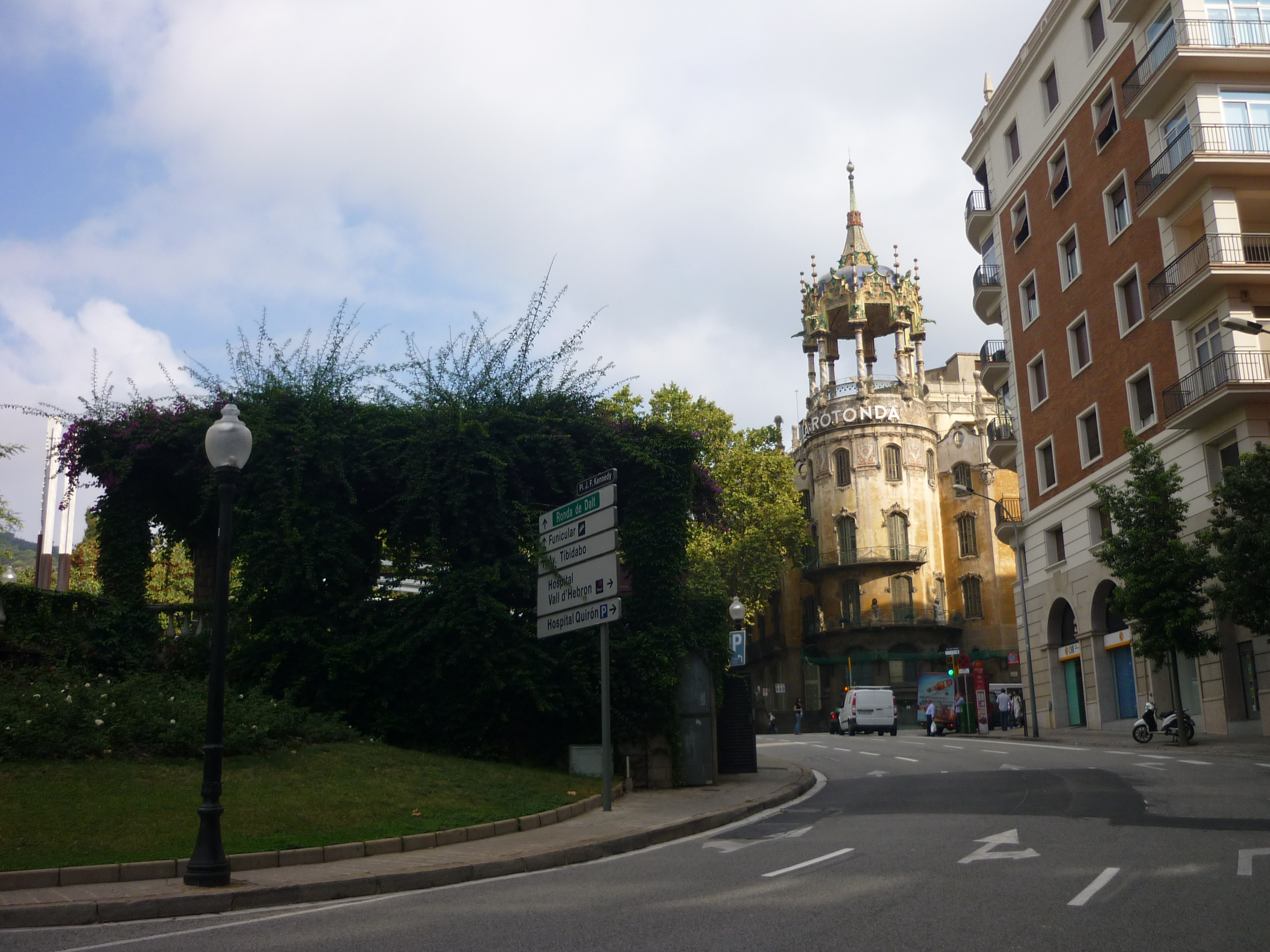
Plaça John F. Kennedy in Barcelona

=== Asia ===
- Kennedy-Guest House This Guest house is present in Siddaganga Institute of Technology, Tumkur, Karnataka, India.
- John F. Kennedy Market in Larkana Sindh, Pakistan is named after President Kennedy.

=== Europe ===
- Kennedy Memorial Park, formerly Eyre Square, Galway, Ireland officially renamed in 1965 in honour of Kennedy, who visited Galway city shortly before his assassination. There is also a bronze bust there to commemorate him.

==== Belgium ====
- John F. Kennedyplein (John F. Kennedy Square), a square in front of the city hall of Blankenberge
- John F. Kennedyplein (John F. Kennedy Square), a square in Bruges, in the Assebroek area
- Place John F. Kennedy (John F. Kennedy Square), a square in Charleroi
- President Kennedyplein (President Kennedy Square), a roundabout in Ostend at the end of the A10 motorway
- J. F. Kennedyplein (J. F. Kennedy Square), a square in Zaventem

==== Croatia ====
- Trg John F. Kennedy (John F. Kennedy square), a square in Zagreb

==== Cyprus ====
- Πλατεία Τζων Κέννεντυ (John Kennedy Square), the central square in Paphos

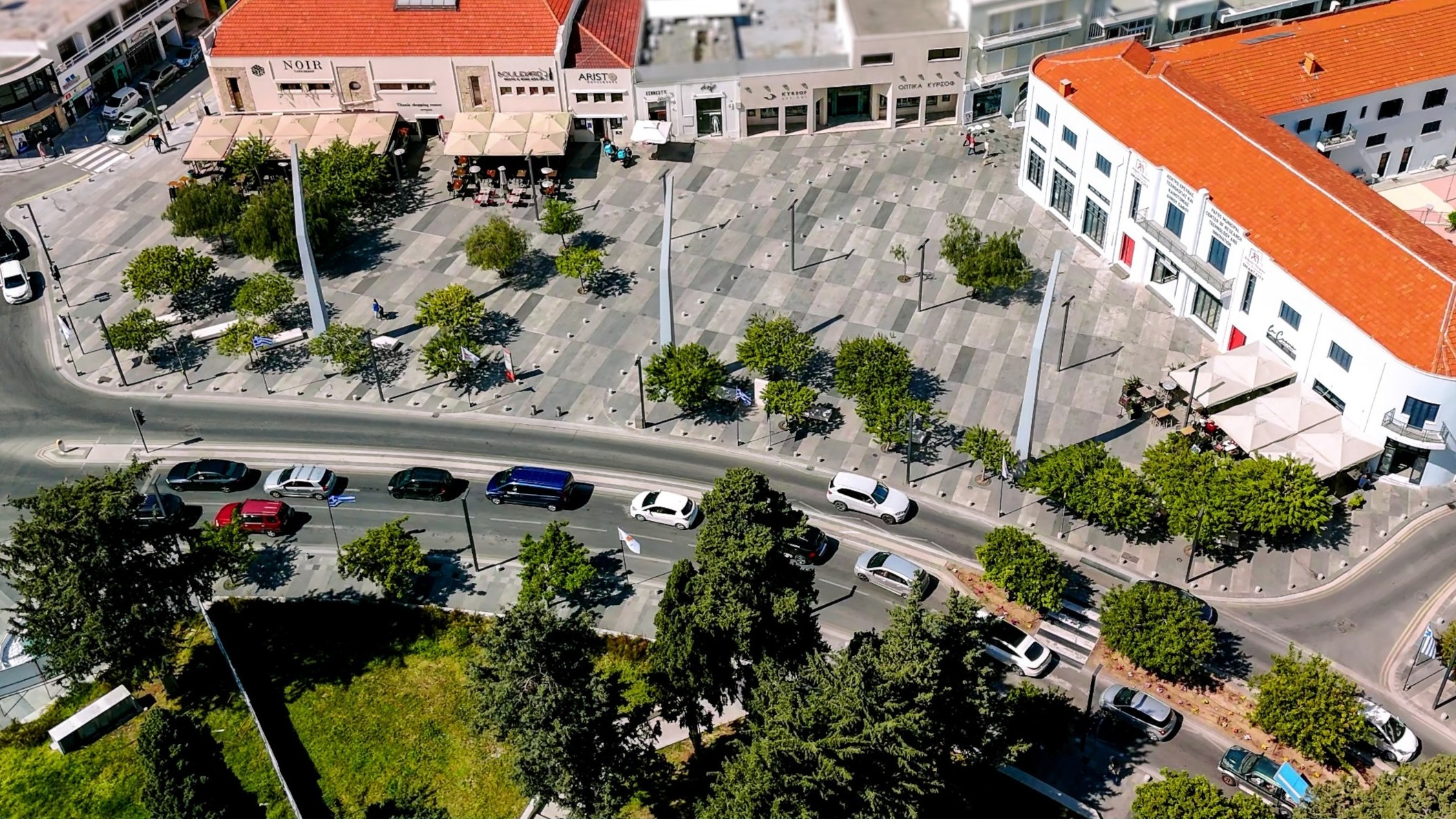
John Kennedy Square in Paphos

==== Denmark ====
- John F. Kennedys Plads (John F. Kennedy's Square), the square in front of the railway station in Aalborg. Adjacent is a shopping mall and bus terminal called Kennedy Arkaden (The Kennedy Arcade).

==== France ====
- Place John F. Kennedy (John F. Kennedy Square), a square in Blois
- Place John F. Kennedy (John F. Kennedy Square), a square in Perpignan
- Place du Président Kennedy (President Kennedy Square), a square in Angers
- Place du Président Kennedy (President Kennedy Square), a square in Cherbourg
- Place du Président Kennedy (President Kennedy Square), a square in Issy-les-Moulineaux
- Place du Président Kennedy (President Kennedy Square), a square in Plérin
- Place du Président Kennedy (President Kennedy Square), a square in Vanves

==== Germany ====
- John-F.-Kennedy-Platz (John F. Kennedy Square), a square located in Berlin-Schöneberg, formerly Rudolph-Wilde-Platz, the location where Kennedy gave his "Ich bin ein Berliner" speech on June 26, 1963. Renamed 3 days after Kennedy's assassination.
- John-Fitzgerald-Kennedy-Platz in Dachau, Bavaria
- Kennedy Park in Aachen, North Rhine-Westphalia

==== Italy ====
- Piazza John Fitzgerald Kennedy (John Fitzgerald Kennedy Square), a square in Castelfiorentino
- Piazza John Fitzgerald Kennedy (John Fitzgerald Kennedy Square), a square in La Spezia
- Piazza John Fitzgerald Kennedy (John Fitzgerald Kennedy Square), a square in Marotta
- Piazza John Fitzgerald Kennedy (John Fitzgerald Kennedy Square), a square in Ravenna
- Piazza John Fitzgerald Kennedy (John Fitzgerald Kennedy Square), a square in Rome, home of the Palazzo dei Congressi
- Piazza J. F. Kennedy (J. F. Kennedy Square), a square in Spello
- Piazza Kennedy (Kennedy Square), a square in Bellusco
- Piazza Kennedy (Kennedy Square), a square in Celico
- Piazza Kennedy (Kennedy Square), a square in Cirò Marina
- Piazza Kennedy (Kennedy Square), a square in Forino
- Piazza Kennedy (Kennedy Square), a square in Jesolo
- Piazza Kennedy (Kennedy Square), a square in Lamezia Terme
- Piazza Kennedy (Kennedy Square), a square in Loreto
- Piazza Kennedy (Kennedy Square), a square in Qualiano
- Piazza JF Kennedy (John F Kennedy Square), a square in Vico Equense

==== Netherlands ====
- John F. Kennedyplein (John F. Kennedy Square), a square in Purmerend
- President Kennedyplein (President Kennedy Square), a square in Beverwijk
- President Kennedyplein (President Kennedy Square), a square in Leidschendam
- President Kennedyplein (President Kennedy Square), a square in Kaatsheuvel
- President Kennedyplein (President Kennedy Square), a square in Maastricht

==== Spain ====
- Plaça John F. Kennedy (John F. Kennedy Square), a square in Barcelona
- Plaza de John F. Kennedy (John F. Kennedy Square), a square in Málaga

=== North America ===
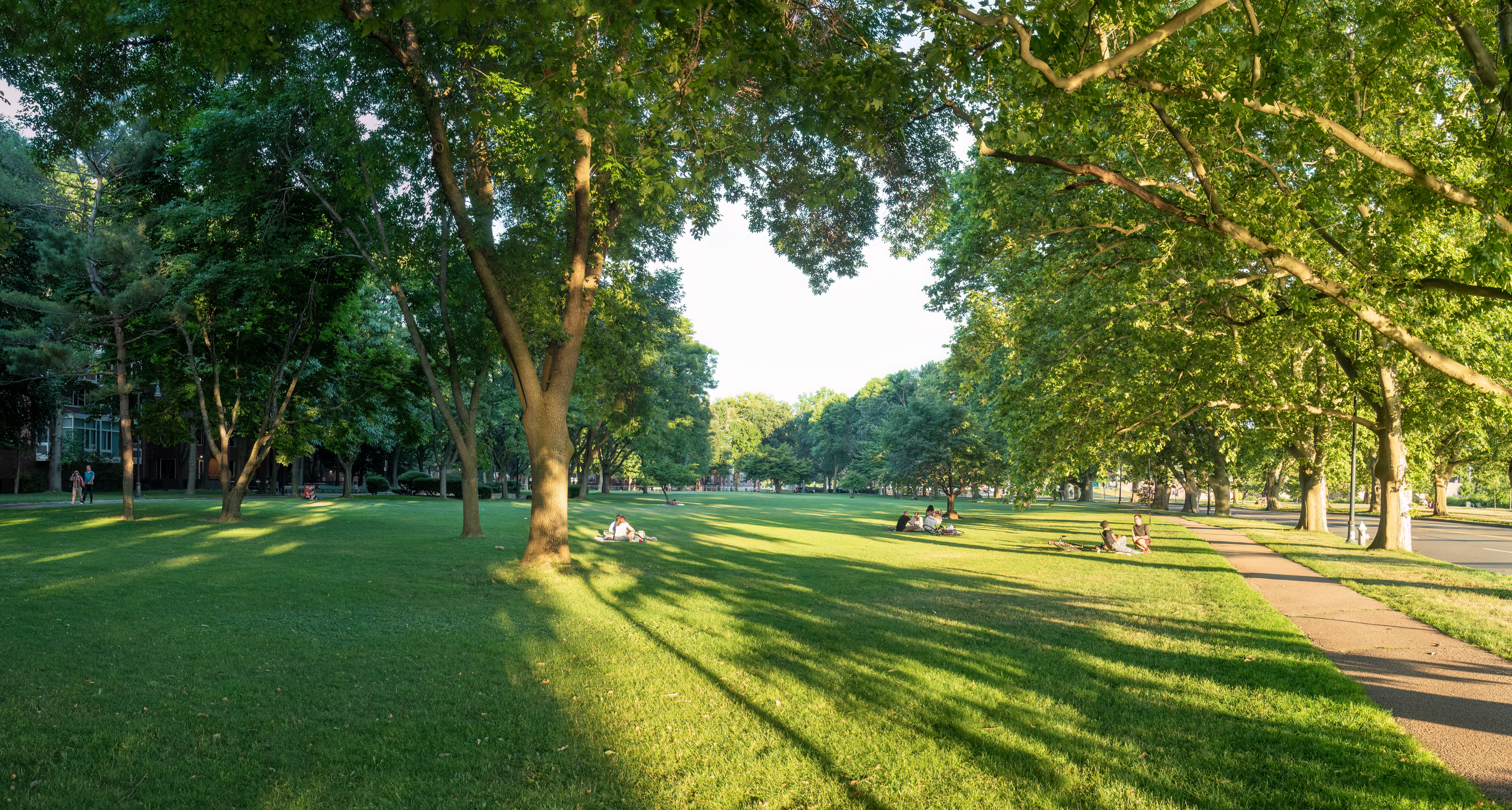
John F. Kennedy Memorial Park in Cambridge, Massachusetts

- John F. Kennedy Memorial Park in Cambridge, Massachusetts, a public park located next to the John F. Kennedy School of Government at Harvard University. The landscaped green space near Harvard Square has a fountain inscribed with JFK quotations, plus open fields and pathways.
- Parc John F. Kennedy in Montreal, Quebec
- John F. Kennedy Park in Atlanta, Georgia
- John F. Kennedy Plaza in Philadelphia, Pennsylvania, nicknamed Love Park
- Kennedy Plaza in Providence, Rhode Island (formerly exchange plaza) located between the Providence City Hall and US Federal Court House
- JFK Memorial Park in Fall River, Massachusetts (public)
- John F Kennedy Park in San José, Costa Rica, a public park in the central area of the city.

=== South America ===
==== Brazil ====
- Praça John Fitzgerald Kennedy (John Fitzgerald Kennedy Square) in São Bernardo do Campo, São Paulo
- Praça Presidente Kennedy (President Kennedy Square), a square in São Paulo

==== Peru ====
- John F Kennedy Park, a park in Arequipa
- Parque Kennedy (John F. Kennedy Park), the central park of Miraflores District, Lima

== Songs ==
- "Abraham, Martin and John", 1968, written by Dick Holler and recorded first by Dion; the title refers to assassination victims Abraham Lincoln, Martin Luther King Jr. and John F. Kennedy. In the song, the lyrics mention Robert F. Kennedy ("Bobby"), as well.
- "Elegy for J.F.K." by Igor Stravinsky (1964)
- "He Was a Friend of Mine", recorded by The Byrds, was included on their 1965 album, Turn! Turn! Turn!. In The Byrds' version, the song's melody is altered and the lyrics are changed to lament John Kennedy's assassination.
- Jazz composer and arranger Oliver Nelson recorded a tribute album entitled The Kennedy Dream which used excerpts from Kennedy's speeches in 1967.
- "Crucifixion", Phil Ochs wrote the song in 1965 and released it on his 1967 album Pleasures of the Harbor
- "In the Summer of His Years", 1963, lyrics by Herb Kretzmer and music by David Lee, first sung by Millicent Martin
- "Elegy for a Young American" by Ronald Lo Presti

== Other ==
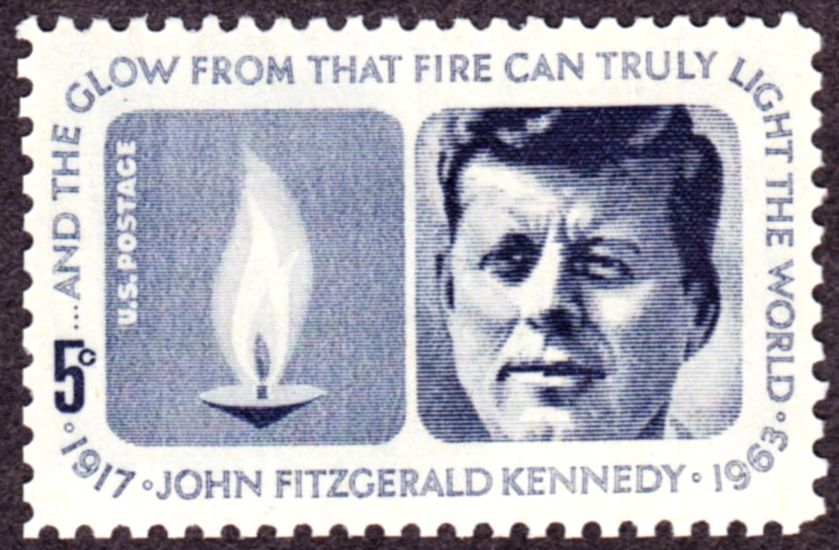
John F. Kennedy memorial issue of 1964

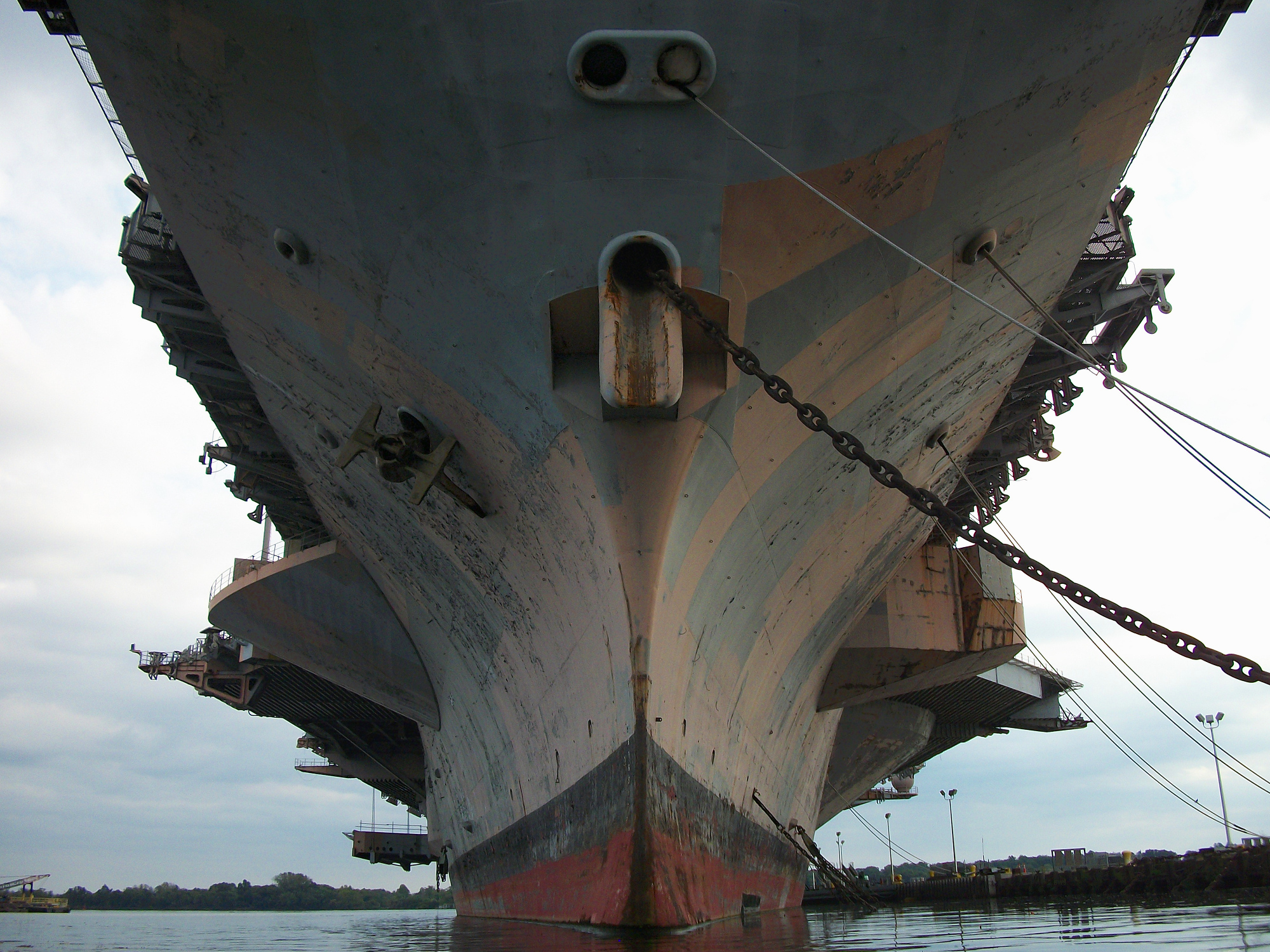
Aircraft carrier USS John F. Kennedy (CV-67), Philadelphia Naval Shipyard, 2018

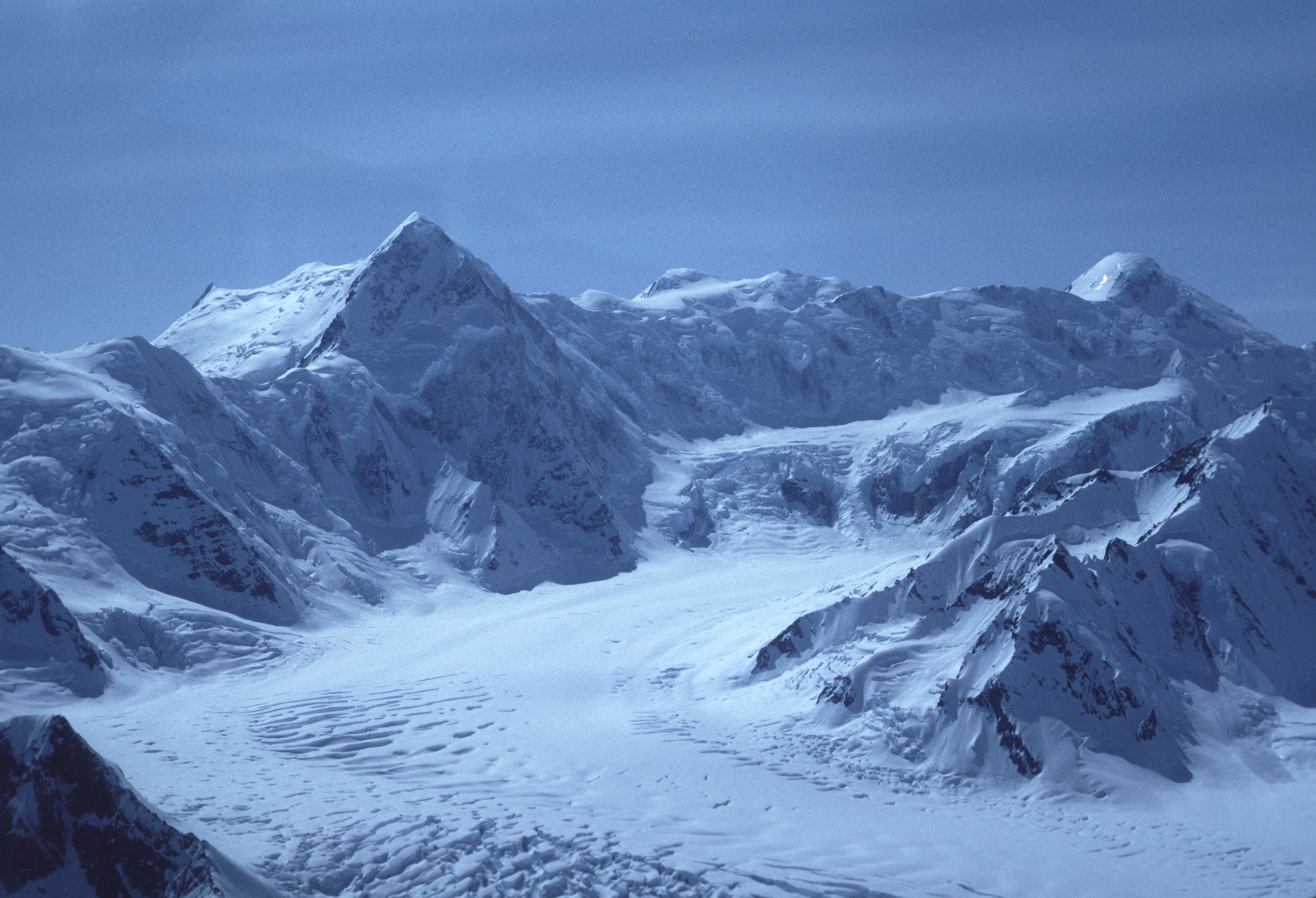
Mount Kennedy in Kluane National Park, Yukon, Canada

- The United States Postal Service honored Kennedy with two postage stamps, a 5¢ issued in 1964, and a Prominent Americans series (1965–1978) 13¢.
- The US Navy aircraft carrier USS John F. Kennedy (CV-67) was named on April 30, 1964, and served until March 23, 2007. A second USS John F. Kennedy was commissioned in 2019.
- The John Fitzgerald Kennedy National Historic Site is a National Historic Site that includes Kennedy's birthplace and childhood home in Brookline, Massachusetts and is open to the public.
- The John F. Kennedy Hyannis Museum is a museum located in Hyannis, Massachusetts. It consists of a collection of photographs relating to the Kennedys and the times they spent vacationing on the Hyannis Port. It includes a video on the Kennedys, a Kennedy Family Tree, and a statue, "What Could Have Been", portraying John F. Kennedy walking on the beach with his adult son, John F. Kennedy Jr.
- The main house of the historic Kennedy Compound in which the Kennedy family would spend their summers and which was Senator John F. Kennedy's home during his senator years (1953-1956) and as well as his main base during his successful 1960 presidential campaign, a place for meetings and interviews and a presidential retreat and summer White House until his assassination, was donated in 2012 to the Edward M. Kennedy Institute for the United States Senate in accordance with the promise Ted Kennedy made to Rose that the house be preserved and used for charity. The institute announced that the house would host educational seminars and that will be open to the general public at specific times as a museum, dedicated to the Kennedy family. As of 2014, the house is undergoing a complete restoration in order to appear exactly as it was in 1960.
- The Kennedy Homestead, birthplace of President John F. Kennedy's great-grandfather Patrick Kennedy, is a cultural museum in Ireland that is dedicated to the Kennedy family and plays an important role in the continued preservation of the legacy of the Kennedys in Ireland.
- The Hyannis Armory which was the site of Kennedy's presidential acceptance speech is now owned by the town of Barnstable, Massachusetts and is open to the public.
- Kennedy was posthumously awarded the Presidential Medal of Freedom in 1963.
- Since 1964, Kennedy's portrait has appeared on the half-dollar coin, replacing Benjamin Franklin.
- John F. Kennedy Medical Center is a hospital located in Edison, New Jersey.
- Mount Kennedy is a peak in the Saint Elias Mountains in Yukon, Canada; named after the President following his assassination
- One of the Solomon Islands is named Kennedy Island
- The city of Evansville, Indiana observed John F. Kennedy Day on November 22, 2003, to mark the 40th anniversary of his death.
- In February 2007, Kennedy's name, along with his wife's, was included on a list taken aboard the Japanese Kaguya spacecraft to the Moon, as part of The Planetary Society's "Wish Upon the Moon" campaign. In addition, they are included on the list onboard NASA's Lunar Reconnaissance Orbiter mission.
- The US Army's John F. Kennedy Special Warfare Center and School is named after the president because of his support for the Army Rangers and Special Forces.
- John F. Kennedy Park in the Auckland suburb of Castor Bay in New Zealand
- The exterior of 14 Prince's Gate, formerly the Royal College of General Practitioners, in London, bears a plaque noting that Kennedy lived there as a boy when his father was US Ambassador to the United Kingdom from 1938 to 1940.
- The Historic Auto Attractions Museum, in Roscoe, Illinois, houses a large display dedicated to the president. Items on display include the 1956 Secret Service Cadillac which followed the car in which the President, Mrs. Kennedy, and Governor and Mrs. Connally were riding when Kennedy was assassinated; a replica of the 1963 Lincoln Continental used by the Kennedy; and several other items related to the Kennedy family, Lee Harvey Oswald, and Jack Ruby.
- A low-cost housing complex in the Jardín Balbuena neighborhood of Mexico City was dedicated to President Kennedy and named after him in 1964. Senator Robert Kennedy and Mexican President Adolfo López Mateos inaugurated it on November 17.

== See also ==
- Cultural depictions of John F. Kennedy
- Assassination of John F. Kennedy in popular culture
- Cultural depictions of Jacqueline Kennedy Onassis
- Presidential memorials in the United States
