= John Kennedy Street, Belgrade =

- Location within Belgrade
- Native name: Улица Џона Кенедија (Serbian)
- Namesake: John F. Kennedy
- Length: 1,453 m (4,767 ft)
- Location: New Belgrade, Belgrade, Serbia

John F. Kennedy Street (Serbian: Улица Џона Кенедија / Ulica Džona Kenedija) is located in New Belgrade, Serbia. It extends from the Nikola Tesla Boulevard} to Tošin Bunar Street, and its length is 1,453 meters. It is named after U.S. President John F. Kennedy (1917-1963).

== See also ==
- List of memorials to John F. Kennedy
