= JFK Stadium (Springfield, Missouri) =

Sport stadium in Springfield, Missouri

- Interactive map of JFK Stadium
- Location: Springfield, Missouri
- Coordinates: 37°11′27″N 93°18′06″W
- Capacity: 5,200
- Surface: Field Turf

Construction
- Opened: 1957

Tenants
- Evangel University; Springfield public schools

JFK Stadium is a sport stadium in Springfield, Missouri. The facility is used by Evangel University and local high schools for American football, track and field, and soccer. It is also host to other university and city athletic and non-athletic events. It was named for former United States President John F. Kennedy.

== See also ==
- List of memorials to John F. Kennedy
