= Jataizinho =

Coordinates: 23.2539°S 50.98°W

- Municipality
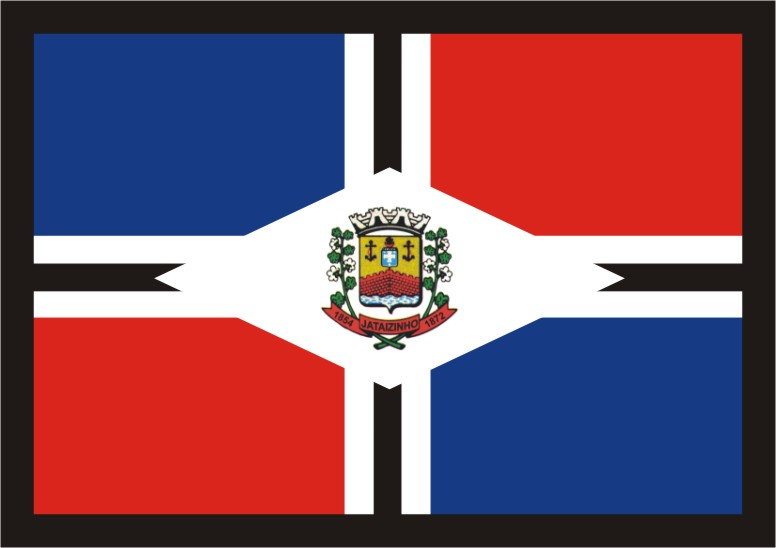
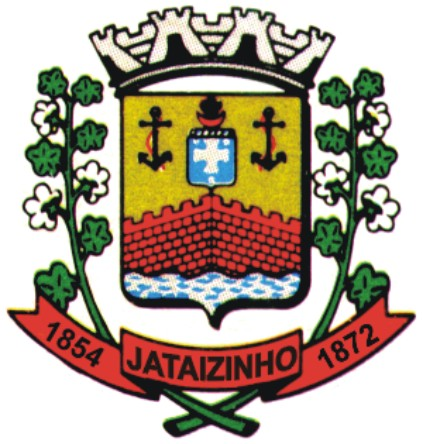
- Flag Coat of arms
- Interactive map of Jataizinho
- Country: Brazil
- Region: Southern
- State: Paraná
- Mesoregion: Norte Pioneiro Paranaense

Population (2022 (Census))
  - Total: 11,813
  - Estimate (2025): 11,996
- Time zone: UTC−3 (BRT)

Jataizinho is a municipality in the state of Paraná in the Southern Region of Brazil.

== See also ==
- List of municipalities in Paraná
