= 2021 in Washington, D.C. =

- Decades: 2000s; 2010s; 2020s
- See also: History of Washington, D.C.; Historical outline of Washington, D.C.; List of years in Washington, D.C.; 2021 in the United States

The following is a list of events of the year 2021 in Washington, D.C..

== Incumbents ==
=== State government ===
- Mayor: Muriel Bowser (D)

== Events ==
Ongoing: COVID-19 pandemic in Washington, D.C.

- January 4: Proud Boys chairperson Enrique Tarrio is arrested for destroying a Black Lives Matter sign at the Asbury United Methodist Church during a protest in Washington, D.C., the month prior.
- January 27: Democrats in the United States Senate introduce a bill that would make Washington, D.C. the 51st state.
- February 24: Mayor of Washington D.C. Muriel Bowser's sister, Merica Bowser, dies from COVID-19 as the city surpasses 1,000 total deaths.
- July 28: Mayor Muriel Bowser issues a mask mandate for indoor public spaces as part of an effort to reduce the spread of COVID-19. The mandate goes into effect on July 31.
- September 20: Mayor Muriel Bowser announces that COVID-19 vaccines will be required for all teachers and students in the district by November 1.

== See also ==
- 2021 in the United States
