= Handshake (disambiguation) =

A handshake is a one-on-one, interpersonal greeting ritual.

Handshake may also refer to:

- Handshake (company), an American employment company
- Handshake (computing), computer terms related to a signal between multiple computing devices or programs
- Handshake deal, another term for an oral contract
- Handshaking lemma, a specific statement in graph theory

== See also ==
- Hand Shakers, a Japanese anime television series
- Secret Handshake (disambiguation)
