= Misinformation during the 2026 Iran war =

During the 2026 Iran war, misinformation and disinformation spread widely across social media platforms and various media outlets.

Some sources claimed that part of this content was generated by Iranian government-linked media, alongside content creators on social media seeking to monetise viral posts. Misinformation also stemmed from government statements, including statements made by US president Donald Trump.

== Fake and AI-generated visual content ==
=== Fabricated imagery and video ===
Since the beginning of the conflict, pro-Iranian government accounts on X posted AI-generated propaganda that quickly went viral. Fake videos of missiles destroying Tel Aviv were shared by former French ambassador to Israel Gérard Araud. The Iranian embassy in Austria posted a fake image depicting a blood-stained child's backpack lying in rubble after the strike on a school in Minab, and a fake image of a destroyed American radar installation in Qatar also went viral.

Due to the volume of AI-generated content posted within less than a week of fighting, X announced on 3 March 2026 that it would demonetise for 90 days any account sharing AI images of armed conflict without disclosing that they had been artificially created.

Video game footage and videos unrelated to the conflict were also used to spread misinformation. Nikita Bier, Head of Product at X, said the platform identified a Pakistani man who had hacked 31 accounts and changed their usernames on 27 February to "Iran War Monitor" or similar variants, using the accounts to post AI-generated war videos. An AI-generated video depicting an Iranian aircraft confronting a US naval vessel, posted on 2 March, was viewed more than seven million times and received over 15,000 likes.

Old videos of explosions in Ukraine and China were used to falsely claim that the explosions had occurred in Israel. Photos of the explosion at Port Sudan in May 2025 were used to falsely claim that Iran had attacked the American military base in Djibouti.

AI-generated images purportedly showing the bodies of Iranian girls also went viral, and were shared by UN Special Rapporteur Francesca Albanese, journalists, and elected officials.

An AI-generated video of the aircraft carrier USS Abraham Lincoln on fire was circulated online by an X account claiming to be part of the Iranian press. US president Donald Trump was initially taken in by the video before being informed by a US general that the Abraham Lincoln remained intact and undamaged.

=== Reporting by BBC Verify and The Guardian ===
BBC Verify reported that an AI-generated video "viewed tens of millions of times" falsely depicted the Burj Khalifa in Dubai — the world's tallest structure — on fire, with a crowd of people shown fleeing the building.

BBC Verify and The Guardian also reported that on the second day of the conflict, 1 March, the state-linked Tehran Times published a photo to X of damage to the US Navy's Fifth Fleet headquarters in Bahrain. Although the headquarters had been struck on 28 February — the first day of the conflict — the AI-generated image depicted a greater degree of damage than had actually occurred.

BBC Verify further reported that the AI chatbot Grok, available on X, was falsely identifying AI-generated videos and photos as genuine. The Guardian reported similar false claims by Grok, and additionally found that Google's Gemini was also incorrectly authenticating AI-generated content. Regarding a bird's-eye view photograph of a mass burial of victims of the 2026 Minab school attack, Gemini falsely described it as depicting the burial of victims of the 2023 Turkey–Syria earthquakes in Kahramanmaraş, Turkey, whilst Grok claimed it showed a mass burial of COVID-19 victims at Rorotan Cemetery in Jakarta, Indonesia, in July 2021.

== Misinformation about specific events and individuals ==
=== Speculation that Alireza Arafi had been assassinated ===
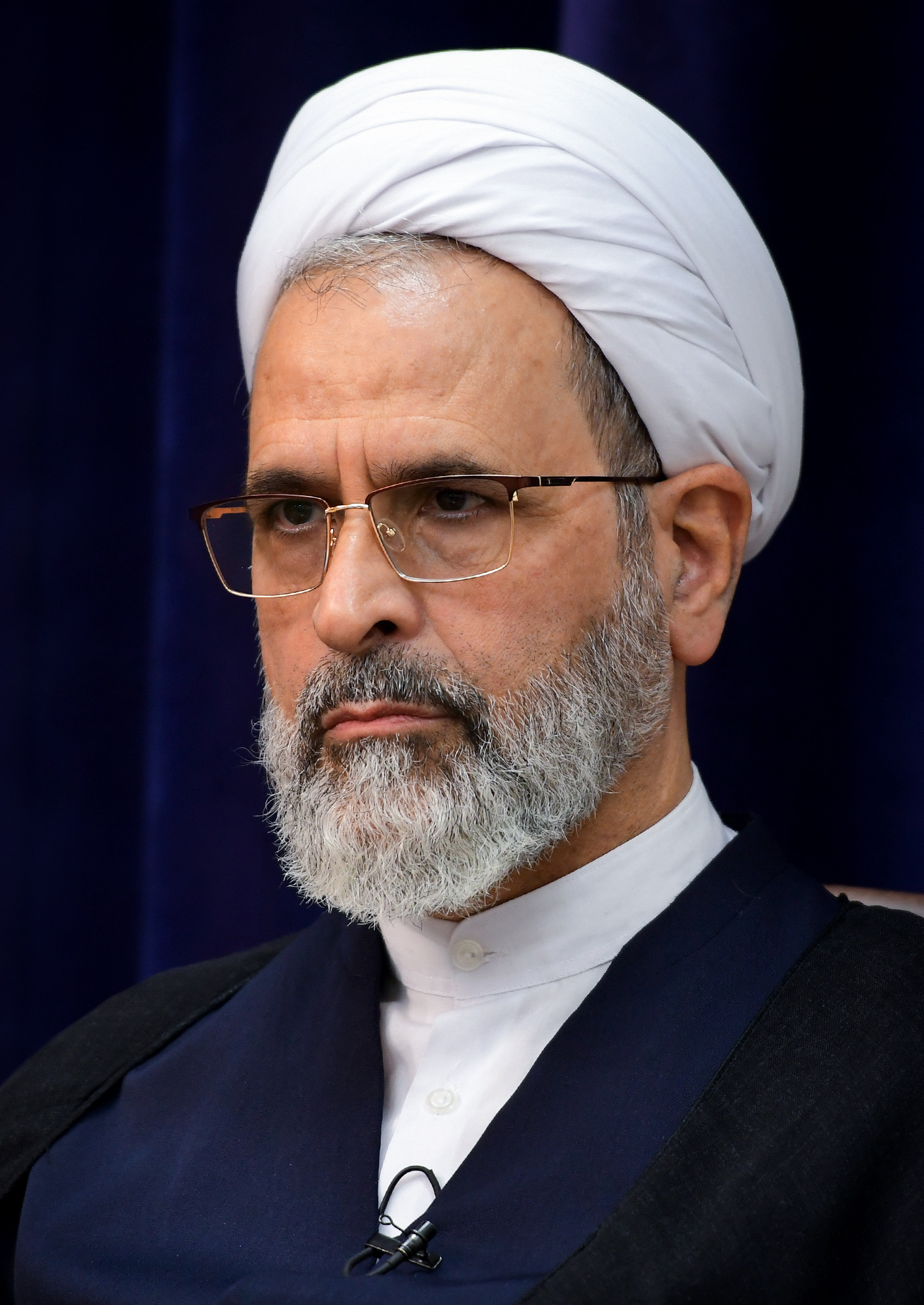
Unsubstantiated claims of Alireza Arafi's death circulated on social media, including a post by former US National Security Adviser and General Michael Flynn

Following the death of Khamenei during the conflict, misinformation circulated on social media claiming that Alireza Arafi, one of the three members of the Interim Leadership Council, had been killed in the strikes on Iran. Among those spreading the claim was US General Michael Flynn, former National Security Adviser to President Donald Trump, who posted to that effect on X. Some Israeli media outlets also reported his death; however, no government — including those of the United States, Israel, and Iran — nor any international media outlet announced his death. All available evidence indicates that Arafi governed Iran alongside the other members of the Interim Leadership Council between the assassination of Ali Khamenei on 1 March 2026 and the election of Mojtaba Khamenei as Supreme Leader on 8 March 2026.

=== False claims of Iranian responsibility for the Minab school attack ===
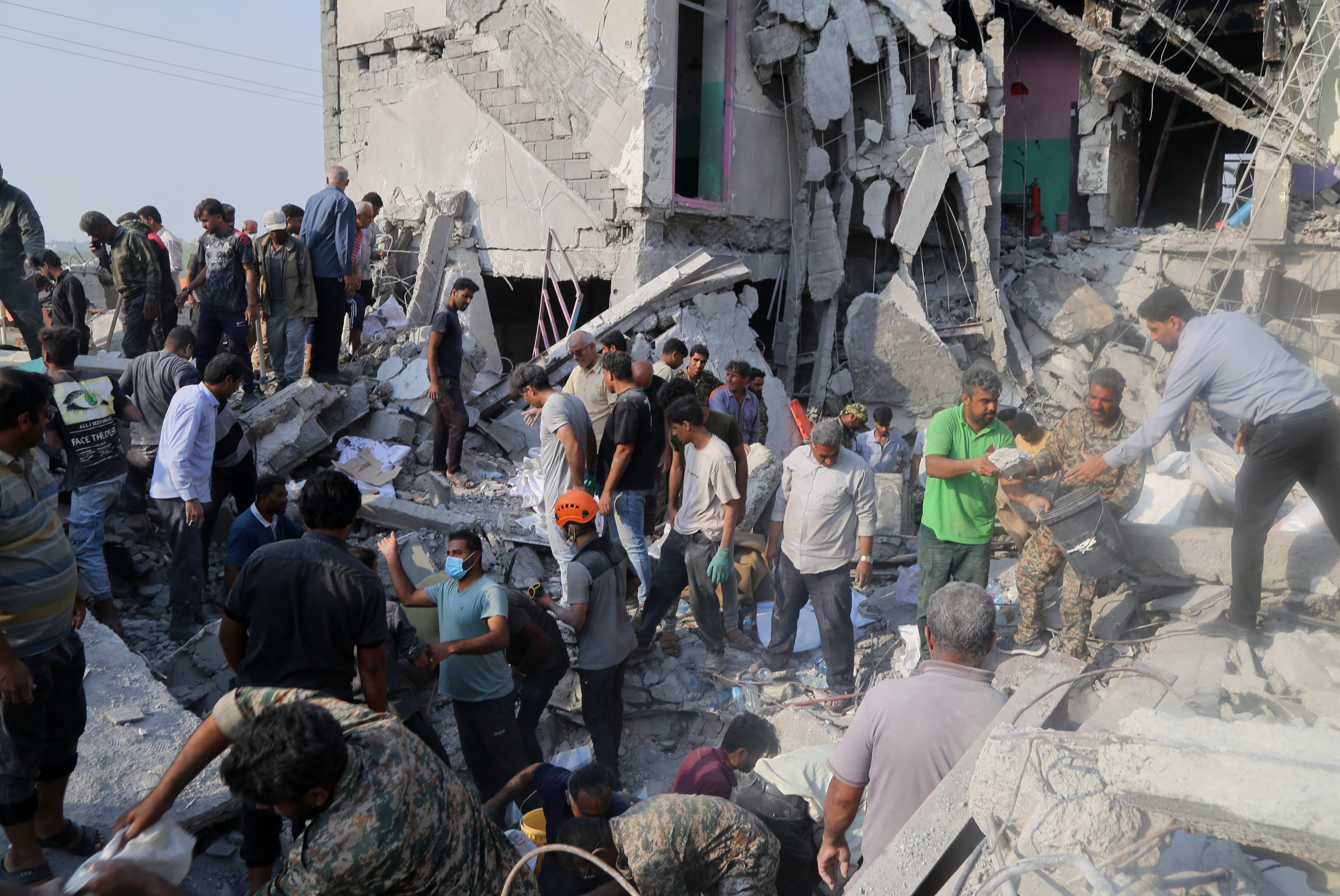
Rescue workers and bystanders at the Minab school after it was attacked

On the first day of the joint US-Israeli strikes, the Shajareh Tayyebeh girls' primary school in Minab, Iran, was struck by a missile, resulting in the deaths of at least 165 people, the majority of whom were young girls. Subsequently, posts on social media falsely alleged that the Iranian government had claimed the IRGC had mistakenly bombed the school. Numerous posts on X included screenshots from a Telegram channel called Radio Gilan, which purportedly showed an IRGC announcement of accidental responsibility for the strike. However, Radio Gilan is not an official Iranian government account and the post linked to no official sources claiming responsibility. Independent reviews found that neither the Iranian government nor state-run media had made any such statements; both instead attributed the attack to the United States and Israel.

Posts on X also shared a photograph falsely alleged to show an IRGC missile misfiring towards the Shajareh Tayyebeh school. Independent analysis established that the photo was not taken in Minab and does not depict the missile that struck the school.

On 7 March 2026, US president Donald Trump told reporters, when asked about the Minab school strike, "In my opinion, based on what I've seen, that was done by Iran," adding, "They're very inaccurate, as you know, with their munitions. They have no accuracy whatsoever. It was done by Iran." Four days later, The New York Times reported that an ongoing US military investigation had determined that the United States was responsible for striking the school with a Tomahawk missile.

=== False statements by Secretary of Defence Pete Hegseth ===
During a press conference about the sinking of IRIS Dena, Secretary of Defence Pete Hegseth falsely stated that it was the first instance of a submarine sinking an enemy surface vessel since the Second World War. In fact, it was the first instance of a US submarine doing so; two previous confirmed instances had occurred: the 1982 British sinking of ARA General Belgrano during the Falklands War, and the 1971 Pakistani sinking of INS Khukri during the India–Pakistan war of 1971, part of the Bangladesh Liberation War. (Note: IRIS Dena was also preceded by the 2010 sinking of the South Korean corvette Cheonan, presumed to have been torpedoed by a North Korean midget submarine; however, this was officially denied by North Korea.)

=== Speculation that Benjamin Netanyahu had died or fled Israel ===
During the second week of the war, a video of a televised address began circulating on social media, prompting some users to speculate that Israeli Prime Minister Benjamin Netanyahu had died or been wounded. Netanyahu subsequently sought to dispel the rumours by posting a video on his X account showing him visiting a coffee shop.

Around the same time, viral content in Europe concerning flight-tracking data claimed that Netanyahu — subject to an arrest warrant from the International Criminal Court — had fled the country and arrived at Berlin Brandenburg Airport to seek refuge in Germany. The claim was based on the movements of the Israeli government aircraft "Wing of Zion", but there was no evidence that Netanyahu was aboard.

== See also ==
- Iranian external operations § Online
- Israeli public diplomacy in the Gaza war § Misinformation and criticism
