= 2027 in Washington, D.C. =

- Decades: 2000s; 2010s; 2020s
- See also: History of Washington, D.C.; Historical outline of Washington, D.C.; List of years in Washington, D.C.; 2027 in the United States

The following is a list of events of the year 2027 in Washington, D.C..

== Events ==
=== Planned or predicted ===
- March 5 to 9 – 2027 CAA men's basketball tournament
- April 29 to May 1 – 2027 NFL draft
