= Secret Handshake =

Secret Handshake(s) may refer to:

- Secret handshake, a distinct form of greeting that conveys membership in or loyalty to a group

== Art ==
- The Secret Handshake (art group), an artist collective responsible for the 23 September 2025 sculpture Best Friends Forever

== Film ==
- The Secret Handshake (film), a 2015 film directed by Howie Klausner

== Music ==
- The Secret Handshake, a 1998 album by Geoff Muldaur
- The Secret Handshake, a 2004 electronica/soul musical project of Luis Dubuc
- Secret Handshakes, a 2010 album by Tub Ring
- Secret Handshake, a 2012 album by Anthony da Costa
