= Jeffrey Epstein Walk of Shame =

Art installation in Washington D.C.

Jeffrey Epstein Walk of Shame is an art installation located in Farragut Square, Washington, D.C., installed on March 2, 2026. Stars are dedicated to many celebrities that are mentioned in the Epstein files, including Bill Gates, Ghislaine Maxwell, Andrew Mountbatten-Windsor, Harvey Weinstein, Elon Musk, Les Wexner and Leon Black.

== See also ==
- 2026 in art
- 2026 in Washington, D.C.
- Best Friends Forever (sculpture)
- King of the World (sculpture)
- List of public art in Washington, D.C.
- Hollywood Walk of Fame
