= List of international prime ministerial trips made by Benjamin Netanyahu =

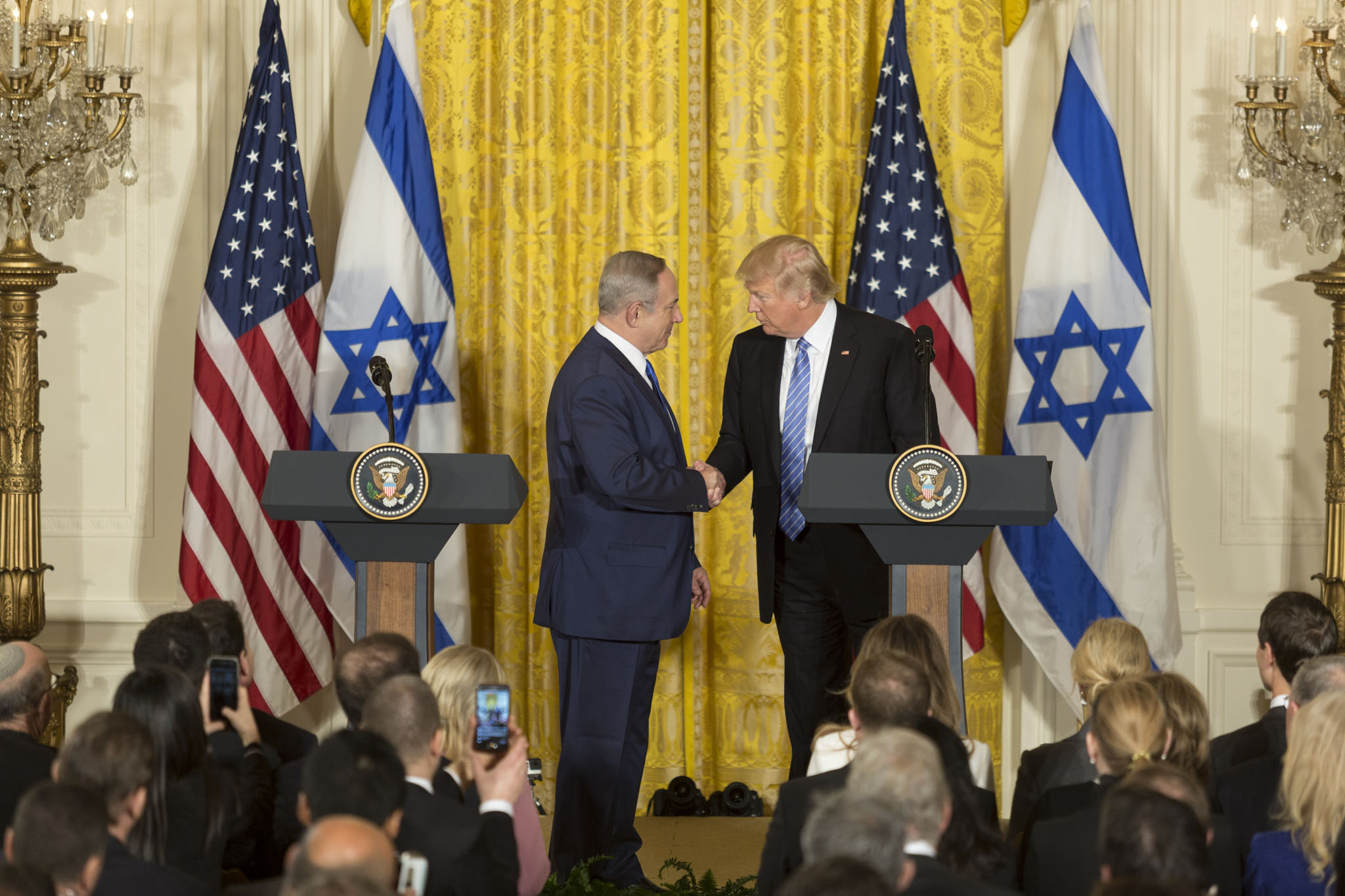
Netanyahu and Donald Trump at a press conference in the White House. February 15, 2017

This is the list of international prime ministerial trips made by Benjamin Netanyahu as Prime Minister of Israel. He has made at least 174 trips in total: 88 visits to Europe, 47 to North America, 23 to Asia, 11 to Africa, 4 to South America, and 1 to Oceania. Visits to the United Nations headquarters in New York are counted as visits to the United States.

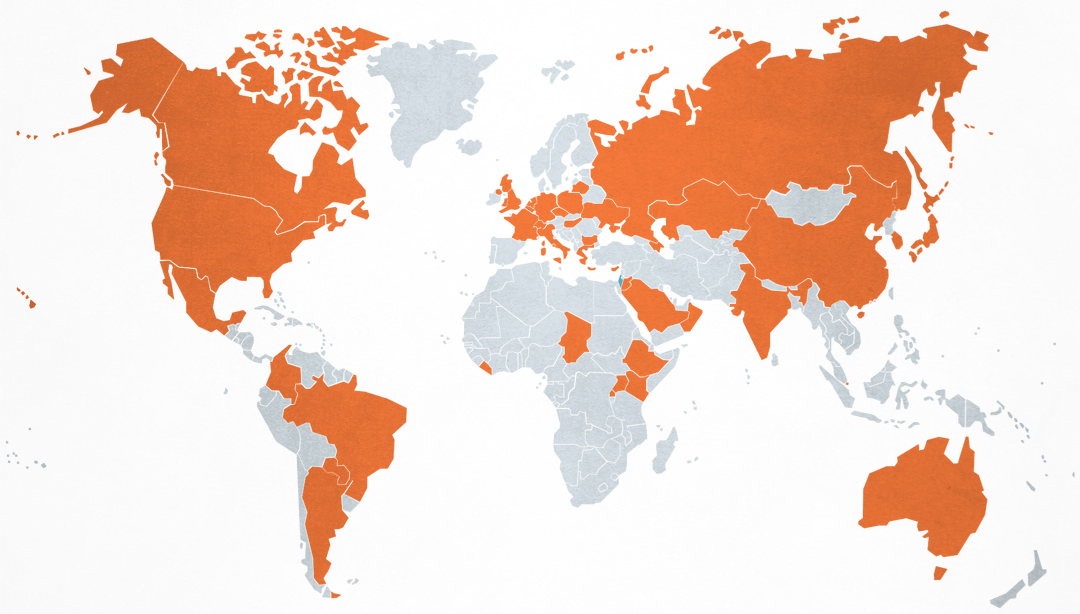
Map of countries visited by Benjamin Netanyahu from 2017 to 2020

Prime Minister Benjamin Netanyahu's visits by country
Number of visits	Country
1 visit (27)	Argentina; Australia; Belgium; Brazil; Bulgaria; Chad; Colombia; Ethiopia; Georgia; India; Ireland; Kazakhstan; Lebanon; Liberia; Lithuania; Mexico; Norway; Oman; Paraguay; Poland; Portugal; Rwanda; Saudi Arabia; Singapore; South Korea; Uganda; Vatican
2 visits (10)	Azerbaijan; Canada; Czech Republic; Hungary; Japan; Kenya; Netherlands; Spain; Ukraine; UAE
3 visits (4)	China; Cyprus; Greece; Switzerland
4 visits (1)	Egypt
6 visits (2)	Italy; Jordan
11 visits (1)	Germany
14 visits (2)	France; United Kingdom
15 visits (1)	Russia
45 visits (1)	United States

== First term (1996–1999) ==
Country	Dates	Purpose	Notes
United States	July 9–12, 1996	Address to the US Congress	
Egypt	July 19, 1996	Working visit	
Jordan	August 5, 1996	Official diplomatic visit	
Lebanon	August 19, 1996	Military and security inspection	
United States	September 6-9, 1996	Private visit and diplomatic discussions	
United States	September 30-October 2, 1996	Participation in the Middle East Summit at the White House	
Portugal	December 2-3, 1996	Participation in the OSCE Summit	
Spain	December 3, 1996	Diplomatic visit	
Ireland	December 4, 1996	Official diplomatic visit	
United States	February 12-14, 1997	Official working visit	
Jordan	February 23, 1997	Working visit	
United States	April 7-8, 1997	Private diplomatic visit	
China	August 24, 1997	Working visit	
Japan	August 24–27, 1997	Working visit	
South Korea	August 28, 1997	Working visit	
Azerbaijan	August 29, 1997	Working visit	First visit by an Israeli PM to Azerbaijan
Jordan	September 28-29, 1997	Secret visit	
United Kingdom	November 12-14, 1997	Official diplomatic visit	
United States	November 17, 1997	Address American Jewish leaders	
United Kingdom	November 18, 1997	Official working visit	
United States	January 19-21, 1998	Working visit	
Spain	March 5, 1998	Official diplomatic visit	
Germany	March 6, 1998	Official diplomatic visit	
Norway	March 6-7, 1998	Official diplomatic visit	
United Kingdom	March 8, 1998	Official diplomatic visit	
United States	September 28-29, 1998	Working visit	
United States	October 15-23, 1998	Diplomatic summit / private visit	
United Kingdom	November 26-27, 1998	Official visit	
Ukraine	March 21, 1999	Working Visit	
Russia	March 21-22, 1999	Official diplomatic visit	
Georgia	March 22, 1999	Stopover and Working visit	

In addition, on August 19, 1996, Netanyahu entered Lebanese territory when he visited IDF troops in Israel's self-proclaimed security zone in southern Lebanon and met with the commander of the South Lebanese Army, Gen. Antoine Lahad.

== Second term (2009–2013) ==
Country	Dates	Purpose	Notes
United States	May 18, 2009	Discussions and working visit.	
Italy	June 23, 2009	Discussions and working visit.	
France	June 24, 2009	Discussion and working visit.	
United Kingdom	August 25–26, 2009	Discussions	
Germany	August 26–27, 2009	State visit	
Egypt	September 13, 2009	Discussions	
United States	September 22, 2009	Attended the 64th United Nations General Assembly.	
United States	November 8-9, 2009	Discussion and working visit.	
France	November 11, 2009	Discussion and working visit.	
France	November 25, 2009	State visit	
Egypt	December 29, 2009	Discussion and working visit.	
Germany	January 18, 2010	Working visit	
United States	March 24, 2010	Discussions	
Egypt	May 3, 2010	Discussions	
France	May 27, 2010	Working visit with President Nicolas Sarkozy	
Canada	May 28, 2010	Discussions	
United States	May 29–30, 2010	State visit	
United States	July 6, 2010	Working visit	
Greece	August 16, 2010	First Visit by an Israeli Prime Minister	
United States	September 1-2, 2010	State visit and bilateral meeting with the leaders of Egypt, Jordan, and the Palestinian Authority	
Germany	October 27, 2010	Working visit	
Russia	March 24, 2011	Discussions and working visit	
Czech Republic	April 7-8, 2011	First Visit by an Israeli Prime Minister	
United Kingdom	May 4, 2011	Working visit	
France	May 5, 2011	Working visit	
United States	May 20-25, 2011	Address to the US Congress	
United States	September 21-23, 2011	Address to the 66th United Nations General Assembly.	
Netherlands	January 18-19, 2012	Official diplomatic visit	
Canada	March 2–4, 2012	State visit	
United States	March 4-6, 2012	Discussions	
United Kingdom	July 9, 2012	Meeting with Olympic athletes	
United Nations	September 26–27, 2012	UNGA address	
France	October 31, 2012	Discussions in Paris and visit in Toulouse	
Czech Republic	December 5, 2012	Discussions	
Germany	December 5–6, 2012	State visit	

== Third term (2013–2015) ==
Country	Dates	Purpose	Notes
United Kingdom	April 16-17, 2013	Attended Margaret Thatcher's funeral	
China	May 5–10, 2013 (Note: Including flight time)	State visit	
Russia	May 14, 2013	Emergency diplomatic meeting	
Poland	June 12–13, 2013	State visit	
United States	September 29-October 1, 2013	Attend the 68th United Nations General Assembly and conduct bilateral diplomatic meetings.	
Russia	November 20, 2013	Discussions regarding Iran deal	
Italy; Vatican	December 1–2, 2013	State visit	
Jordan	January 16, 2014	Diplomatic meeting	
Switzerland	January 23, 2014	World Economic Forum in Davos	
United States	March 4, 2014	AIPAC policy conference	
Japan	May 11–14, 2014	State visit	
United States	October 1, 2014	Working Visit.	
Italy	December 15, 2014	State visit	
France	January 11–12, 2015	Charlie Hebdo and Hypercacher shooting memorial	
United States	March 1–3, 2015	Address to a joint session of the United States Congress and AIPAC	

=== Unconfirmed ===
Country	Dates	Purpose	Notes
Jordan	2014	Discussions regarding Temple Mount tensions	

== Fourth term (2015–2020) ==
Since May 14, 2015, Netanyahu heads the thirty-fourth government of Israel, acting both as prime minister and minister of foreign affairs.

Country	Dates	Purpose	Notes
Italy	August 27–30, 2015	Working visit	Netanyahu attended the Expo 2015 in Milan.
United Kingdom	September 9–10, 2015	State visit	
Russia	September 21, 2015	Discussions regarding the Syrian Civil War	
United Nations	October 1, 2015	UNGA address	
Germany	October 21, 2015	State visit	
United States	November 8–11, 2015	Discussions	
France	November 30, 2015	Working visit	Netanyahu attended Paris Climate Conference.
Switzerland	January 20–21, 2016	World Economic Forum in Davos	
Cyprus	January 28, 2016	Cyprus–Greece–Israel trilateral summit	
Germany	February 15–17, 2016	Government-to-government meetings	
Russia	April 21, 2016	Discussions regarding the Syrian Civil War	
Russia	June 6–7, 2016	Discussions regarding the Syrian Civil War, marking 25 years of Israel–Russia relations	
Italy	June 26–28, 2016	State visit	
Uganda; Kenya; Rwanda; Ethiopia	July 4–7, 2016	State visit	First visit to Africa by an Israeli PM in 30 years
Netherlands	September 6–7, 2016	State visit	
United States; United Nations	September 20–26, 2016	Discussions with US officials UNGA address	
Azerbaijan; Kazakhstan	December 13–14, 2016	State visit	First visit by an Israeli PM to Kazakhstan and second to Azerbaijan
United Kingdom	February 6, 2017	Discussions	
United States	February 13–17, 2017	State visit	
Singapore	February 19–21, 2017	State visit	First time an Israeli PM visited Singapore
Australia	February 22–25, 2017	State visit	First time an Israeli PM visited Australia
Russia	March 9, 2017	Discussions regarding the Syrian civil war	
China	March 20–21, 2017 (Note: Excluding flight time)	State visit	
Liberia	June 4, 2017	Summit of ECOWAS leaders	
Greece	June 14, 2017	Cyprus–Greece–Israel trilateral summit	
France; Germany	June 30 – July 2, 2017	Working visit and Funeral of former German chancellor Kohl	
France; Hungary	July 15–19, 2017	State visit	
Russia	August 23, 2017	Discussions regarding the Syrian civil war	
Argentina	September 10–19, 2017	State visit	First time an Israeli PM visited South America
Paraguay	September 10–19, 2017	State visit	First time an Israeli PM visited South America
Colombia	September 10–19, 2017	State visit	First time an Israeli PM visited South America
Mexico	September 10–19, 2017	State visit	First time an Israeli PM visited South America
United States	September 10–19, 2017	Meeting with US president Donald Trump	First time an Israeli PM visited South America
United Nations	September 10–19, 2017	UNGA address	First time an Israeli PM visited South America
United Kingdom	November 2–5, 2017	Marking Balfour Declaration centenary	
Kenya	November 28, 2017	State visit, meeting with 11 African leaders	
France; Belgium	December 10–11, 2017	State visit	
India	January 14–19, 2018	State visit	
Switzerland	January 23–26, 2018	World Economic Forum in Davos	
Russia	January 29, 2018	Discussions regarding Iran	
Germany	February 16–18, 2018	Munich Security Conference	
United States	March 4–8, 2018	State visit, AIPAC conference	
Cyprus	May 8, 2018	Cyprus–Greece–Israel trilateral summit	
Russia	May 9, 2018	Discussions regarding the Syrian Civil War	Netanyahu attended the 2018 Moscow Victory Day Parade.
Germany; France; United Kingdom	June 4–6, 2018	Discussions regarding the Iran nuclear deal	
Jordan	June 18, 2018	Discussions	
Russia	July 11, 2018	Discussions regarding the Syrian Civil War	Netanyahu and Russian president Vladimir Putin watched the 2018 FIFA World Cup semi-final game between Croatia and England.
Lithuania	August 23–25, 2018	State visit	First time an Israeli PM visited Lithuania.
United Nations	September 25–30, 2018	UNGA address	
Oman	October 25–26, 2018	Official visit	First meeting of this kind since 1996.
Bulgaria	November 1–2, 2018	Discussions with Craiova Group	
France	November 11–12, 2018	Paris Peace Forum	Netanyahu cut his trip short, returning to Israel on November 11 overnight due to events in Gaza.
Brazil	December 28, 2018 – January 2, 2019	State visit and participation in presidential inauguration of Jair Bolsonaro	First time an Israeli PM visited Brazil
Chad	January 20, 2019	Re-establishment of diplomatic ties	First time an Israeli PM visited Chad
Russia	February 27, 2019	Discussions regarding the Syrian Civil War	
United States	March 25, 2019	State visit	
Ukraine	August 18–19, 2019	State Visit	
United Kingdom	September 5, 2019	Discussion regarding Iran	
Russia	September 12, 2019	Discussions on cooperation between Israeli and Russian forces operating in Syria	
Greece	January 2, 2020	Discussions to sign gas pipeline deal with Cyprus	
United States	January 28, 2020	Discussions on Middle East peace plan	
Russia	January 30, 2020	Discussions on Middle East peace plan	

=== Unconfirmed ===
Country	Dates	Purpose	Notes
Jordan	2016	Egypt–Israel–Jordan summit	

== Fifth term (2020–2021) ==
Country	Dates	Purpose	Notes
United States	15 September 2020	Signing of Abraham Accords peace agreement between Israel, Bahrain and the United Arab Emirates, brokered by the United States.	
Saudi Arabia	22 November 2020	Talks with American and Saudi officials. Trip made public only upon return.	

== Sixth term (2022–present) ==
Country	Dates	Purpose	Notes
Jordan	January 24, 2023	Strategic, security and economic cooperation	
France	February 2, 2023	State visit	
Italy	March 4, 2023	State visit	
Germany	March 16, 2023	State visit	
United Kingdom	March 24, 2023	State visit	
Cyprus	September 3, 2023	State visit	
United Nations	September 19–26, 2023	UNGA Address	
United States	July 22–27, 2024	Address a Joint session of Congress, meetings with President Joe Biden, Vice President Kamala Harris, and Republican nominee former president Donald Trump	
United Nations	September 26–27, 2024	UNGA Address. Trip cut short following the 2024 Hezbollah headquarters strike.	

=== Post-ICC indictment ===
On November 21, 2024, the International Criminal Court issued an arrest warrant for Benjamin Netanyahu, severely limiting his options for traveling outside Israel without the risk of being arrested. Formally, all 124 countries who are parties to the Rome Statute are obligated to arrest him upon entry. The arrest warrant also complicates his ability to travel to countries that are not parties to the Rome Statute, due to the risk of an emergency landing during the trip in a country that is a party to the statute. In February 2025, during Netanyahu's first international trip after the ICC arrest warrant was issued, his plane flew a path that was longer than usual in order to fly over American military bases in case he needed to make an emergency stop for medical reasons. (Note: Netanyahu had surgery a few weeks prior to the trip)

Although Hungary was a party to the Rome Statute, Hungarian Prime Minister Viktor Orbán publicly declared that he will not arrest Netanyahu if he arrived in Hungary for a visit. Orban announced Hungary's departure from the Rome Statute when Netanyahu came to visit in April 2025. Just prior to the announcement, the ICC sent Hungary a request for Netanyahu's extradition.

Both Poland and Italy privately assured Israeli officials that should Netanyahu arrive in their country, they would use the Vienna Convention on Diplomatic Relations to avoid extraditing him to the ICC. After winning the election in 2025, Friedrich Merz publicly announced that he "would find a way" for Netanyahu to visit Germany "without being arrested under the warrant by the International Criminal Court".

In mid-December 2024, reports surfaced that Netanyahu had gone to Cairo to attend ceasefire negotiations for the Gaza war. Netanyahu's office denied the reports, saying that on the day in question, Netanyahu was actually visiting Syrian territory invaded by Israel following the fall of the Assad regime.

Country	Dates	Purpose	Notes	ICC warrant issues
United States	February 3–8, 2025	Discuss with Trump the Phase 2 of the January 2025 Gaza war ceasefire and introduction of Donald Trump's February 2025 Gaza Strip proposal	First meeting by Donald Trump with a foreign leader during his second term	United States is not a party to the Rome Statute.
Hungary	April 2–6, 2025	Meeting with Hungarian Prime Minister Viktor Orbán regarding the two countries' defense cooperation	First country that is member of ICC.	Hungary announced its intention to withdraw from the Rome Statute during the trip. (Note: A year later, the next Prime Minister of Hungary, Péter Magyar, announced that he would arrest Netanyahu should Netanyahu set foot on Hungarian soil. Magyar made the announcement a few weeks prior to taking office.)
United States	April 7–9, 2025	Discussion of the impacts of the tariffs announced by Trump on Israel	First foreign leader to negotiate a deal with Trump to remove tariffs.	United States is not a party to the Rome Statute. (Note: Flying to the headquarters of the United Nations means flying to New York City, which is in the United States.)
United States	July 7–9, 2025	Ceasefire and regional diplomacy		United States is not a party to the Rome Statute.
United Nations United States	September 25–30, 2025	UNGA Address, introduction of the Gaza peace plan, and an apology for the 2025 Israeli attack on Doha	The flight to New York City took 13 hours, rather than the normal 11 hours, because the plane carrying Netanyahu avoided European airspace.	United States is not a party to the Rome Statute.
United States	December 28, 2025–January 1, 2026	Gaza peace plan, 2024 Israel–Lebanon ceasefire agreement, Twelve-Day War ceasefire	Flightradar24 reported that the flight to the United States was its most tracked flight, with about 1,000 people tracking the plane. Based on Flightradar24 data, it appeared that the plane had crossed Greek, Italian, and French airspace.	United States is not a party to the Rome Statute.
United States	February 10–13, 2026	2025–2026 US–Iran negotiations, 2026 United States military buildup in the Middle East	The trip was originally scheduled to take place February 18–22, but was moved up. Netanyahu briefed the Trump administration with military options regarding Iran, which decisively influenced Trump's decision to launch Operation Epic Fury on February 28, 2026.	United States is not a party to the Rome Statute.
United Arab Emirates	March 26, 2026	Discussions with Mohammed bin Zayed about the Iran war's impact on the United Arab Emirates.	The United Arab Emirates requested that the trip remain confidential. However, Netanyahu's office publicized the trip on May 13, which was swiftly denied by the UAE. Within a few days, enough information surfaced that Professor Ali Bakir of the Qatar University's Ibn Khaldon Center for Humanities and Social Sciences concluded that Netanyahu did indeed visit the UAE.	United Arab Emirates is not a party to the Rome Statute.
United States	July 27–29, 2026	Discussions with Trump about the 2026 Iran war, the funeral of Lindsey Graham	Due to security precautions, his plane departed from and landed back at military airbases rather than the civilian Ben-Gurion Airport and the times of departure were not announced in advance.	United States is not a party to the Rome Statute
United Nations	September 24, 2026	UNGA Address along with meetings with leaders from Argentina, Bolivia, Paraguay, Panama, Ethiopia, Greece, Slovenia, and Papua New Guinea	In July 2026, ahead of the visit, New York Mayor Zohran Mamdani announced that he was looking into the possibility of arresting Netanyahu should Netanyahu arrive in New York City for the occasion. Trump responded on his social media, "Benjamin Netanyahu will not be arrested, in any way, shape, or form, while in the United States of America." Mamdani eventually conceded that the NYPD cannot arrest Netanyahu.	United States is not a party to the Rome Statute
United Arab Emirates	September 27, 2026	Discussions with Mohammed bin Zayed about the Iran war's impact on the United Arab Emirates.	It was reported that Netanyahu also asked bin Zayed to deny reports that the UAE had warned Israel in advance of the October 7 attacks.	United Arab Emirates is not a party to the Rome Statute.
