= 2026 in Washington, D.C. =

- Decades: 2000s; 2010s; 2020s
- See also: History of Washington, D.C.; Historical outline of Washington, D.C.; List of years in Washington, D.C.; 2026 in the United States

The following is a list of events of the year 2026 in Washington, D.C..

== Incumbents ==
=== District government ===
- Mayor: Muriel Bowser (D)

== Events ==
=== January ===
- January 9 – The Washington National Opera announces it will no longer perform at the Kennedy Center due to a new requirement that productions must be fully funded in advance to performances.
- January 11 – A photo display of President Trump at the National Portrait Gallery is changed to remove references to his two impeachments.
- January 23 – A sewage pipeline ruptures and spills wastewater into the Potomac River, causing significant pollution ahead of the winter storm.

=== February ===
- February 2 – Nhi Linh, an Asian elephant at the National Zoo, gives birth to a calf named Linh Mai.
- February 4 – The Washington Post announces mass layoffs as part of budget cuts. The cuts include the closure of the Sports and Books sections and the cancellation of the Post Reports podcast.
- February 10 – A Walk for Peace by Buddhist monks that began in Fort Worth, Texas in October 2025 concludes in Washington.
- February 17 – An 18-year-old Georgia man is arrested after approaching the United States Capitol while holding a shotgun.
- February 18 – Mayor Bowser declares an emergency and requests federal help to help the city fight the sewage rupture that occurred on January 23.
- February 24 – President Trump delivers the 2026 State of the Union Address.

=== March ===
- March 11 – A man is detained for driving a vehicle through a barrier near the White House.
- March 13 – Kennedy Center President Richard Grenell announces he is stepping down.

=== April ===
- April 1 – The Supreme Court hears oral arguments in Trump v. Barbara, which challenges Executive Order 14160, which ends birthright citizenship for children of people in the country illegally. Trump attends oral arguments, making him the first president to do so at the Supreme Court.
- April 20 – U.S. Capitol Police arrest 62 protesters, mostly veterans and military family members, during a demonstration against the war in Iran in the Cannon House Office Building.
- April 25 – Shots are fired outside the White House Correspondents' Dinner in the Washington Hilton. One injury is reported and a suspect is taken into custody. He is charged with attempting to assassinate President Trump.
- April 26 – King Charles III and Queen Camilla of the United Kingdom arrive for a 4 day state visit.

=== May ===
- May 1–6 – A man named Guido Reichstadter occupies an arch atop the Frederick Douglass Memorial Bridge as part of a protest against artificial intelligence and the war in Iran. Reichstadter previously protested atop the same bridge in 2022.
- May 4 – Secret Service agents shoot a man who allegedly fired at them during a confrontation near the Washington Monument. A nearby child is grazed by gunfire.
- May 8 – Three Idaho National Guard members arrest a retired Army captain in front of her home. A Metro Police officer tells the captain's neighbor that she was a suspect in an earlier assault against National Guard members, though no charges were ever filed against her. The woman later files a lawsuit against the National Guard, saying she was targeted for having signs at her home opposing the National Guard presence.
- May 23 – A man fires several shots at a White House security checkpoint. Secret Service agents return fire, killing the gunman. A bystander is also injured.
- May 29 – A federal judge blocks the Trump administration from adding his name to the Kennedy Center.

=== June ===
- June 13
  - The Kennedy Center removes Trump's name from the building.
  - The 2026 United Bowl is held at Audi Field. The Louisville Kings win their first championship, defeating the defending UFL champions, the D.C. Defenders, by a score of 27–20.
- June 14 – UFC Freedom 250 takes place on the South Lawn of the White House.
- June 19 – Former Olympic canoeist David Hearn is arrested for touching a piece of paint that had come loose from the Lincoln Memorial Reflecting Pool.
- June 25–July 10 – The Great American State Fair is held on the National Mall.
- June 26 – The District of Columbia reaches a settlement with a man who was detained by police in September 2025 for playing The Imperial March, Darth Vader's theme from Star Wars, while following National Guard members.

=== July ===
- July 4 – United States Semiquincentennial celebrations take place.
- July 31 – The Justice Department moves to drop charges against David Hearn.

=== August ===
- August 4 – A plane departing from Ronald Reagan National Airport flies closer to the Marine One helicopter than regulations allow. The incident occurs after air traffic controllers at Reagan fail to halt commercial flights as required when the president departs.
- August 13
  - The board of the Kennedy Center votes in favor of adding signage that reads "The John F. Kennedy Center for the Performing Arts Restored and Renovated By President Donald J. Trump" to the building's facade and closing the center for two years to construct a plaza named for Trump.
  - The World War II Memorial on the National Mall is vandalized, with bubbles filling a fountain and the words "Clean hands dirty $" painted on a surface.
- August 23 – The Freedom 250 Grand Prix is held on the National Mall. Kyle Kirkwood wins.
- August 25
  - A California man is arrested for bringing a guillotine near the U.S. Capitol.
  - A Georgia National Guardsman allegedly points a handgun at another Guardsman during an argument over if their hairstyles follow regulations. The Guardsman is arrested and charged in September.
- August 31 – The Supreme Court allows the Trump administration to continue with construction of the White House ballroom.

=== September ===
- September 14 – Senator Mitch McConnell makes his first public appearance since his hospitalization on June 14.
- September 15 – The Kennedy Center board votes to close hours after a judge blocks an effort to add Trump's name to the building.
- September 18
  - Demonstrators gather outside the Kennedy Center to protest Trump's plans for the building. The protests are sparked by a photo taken of the president looking at a printout partially reading "Kennedy Center DEMOLIS…"
  - Trump announces he is banning CNN, MS NOW, and Politico from the White House over their reporting, which he calls "fake news".
- September 24 – A judge orders Trump to restore White House access to CNN, MS NOW, and Politico. Despite this, the organizations report that their journalists are still barred from the White House.
- September 28 – A judge declares a mistrial in the bribery case of former city councilman Trayon White.

=== October ===
- October 27 – A judge orders the halting of construction at East Potomac Park following a lawsuit filed by a preservationist group. Despite this, Trump says construction will go on as scheduled.

=== November ===
- November 3 – 2026 District of Columbia elections:
  - 2026 Council of the District of Columbia election
  - 2026 United States Shadow Representative election in the District of Columbia
  - 2026 District of Columbia Attorney General election
  - 2026 Washington, D.C., mayoral election: Janeese Lewis George wins the election.
  - 2026 United States House of Representatives election in the District of Columbia: Robert White wins the election.
- November 5 – The DHS reports the Secret Service arrested a Venezuelan national near the White House who was found in a stolen vehicle with several firearms. The DHS says the man told officers he heard voices in his head telling him to come to Washington, D.C. to kill President Trump.
- November 12 – One person is killed and five injured in a shooting at an apartment and at the Vida Fitness gym near Logan Circle. The shooter fired at officers, missing them, and then committed suicide in his apartment.

=== Unknown ===
- Proposed completion of the Memorial Circle arch.

== See also ==
- 2026 in the United States
