= 1790 in Washington, D.C. =

- Decades: 1790s; 1800s; 1810s
- See also: History of Washington, D.C.; Historical outline of Washington, D.C.; List of years in Washington, D.C.; 1790 in the United States

The following is a list of events of the year 1790 in Washington, D.C..

== Events ==
- January 4 – Robert Peter is elected the mayor of Georgetown.
- July 16 – The Residence Act is adopted during the second session of the 1st United States Congress and signed into law by President George Washington, establishing Washington, D.C. as the capital.

== See also ==
- 1790 in the United States
