= Best Friends Forever (sculpture) =

2025 U.S. art installation

- Why Can't We Be Friends?
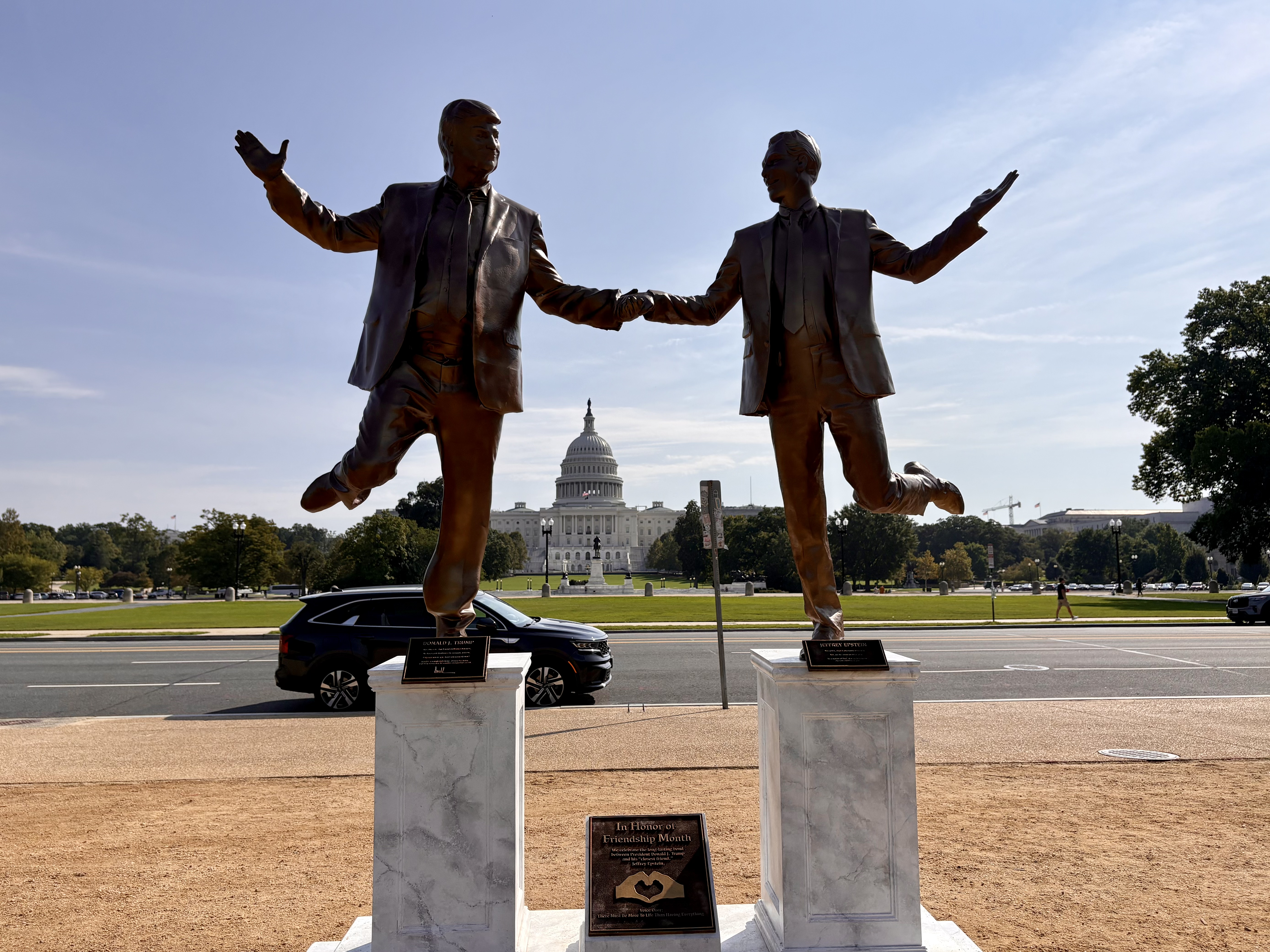
- The statue of Donald Trump (left) and Jeffrey Epstein (right) in Washington, D.C., with the United States Capitol Building in the background
- Artist: The Secret Handshake (art group)
- Year: 2025
- Medium: Sculpture
- Subject: Donald Trump; Jeffrey Epstein
- Location: Washington, D.C.

Best Friends Forever (also known as Why Can't We Be Friends?) is a statue of US president Donald Trump and financier Jeffrey Epstein, briefly installed at the National Mall in downtown Washington, D.C., on September 23, 2025. Created by an anonymous art group known by the alias "The Secret Handshake", the sculpture was created in protest of the relationship of Trump and Epstein and the closely associated sexual misconduct allegations against Trump.

The sculpture had permits to stay on display until September 28, but was dismantled by the United States Park Police within 24 hours of installation. The statue was temporarily reinstalled on the National Mall from October 2 to 5, 2025, and reappeared outside a Northwest Washington, D.C., Busboys and Poets coffeehouse in November 2025.

== Description ==
Best Friends Forever is a 12-foot-tall (3.7 m) statue consisting of two sculptures on podiums, depicting incumbent United States president Donald Trump (north) holding hands and frolicking with the late convicted sex offender Jeffrey Epstein (south). Three plaques were located at the foot of Trump, Epstein, and center of the base. The sculpture was created in protest of the relationship of Trump and Epstein and the closely associated sexual misconduct allegations against Trump; it was constructed from foam, resin, wood, and wire, and colored to appear bronze on a marble base. The center plaque stated:

In Honor of Friendship Month

We celebrate the long-lasting bond
between President Donald J. Trump
and his "closest friend",
Jeffrey Epstein.

Voice Over:
There Must Be More To Life Than Having Everything. (Note: The first line of a birthday card attributed to Donald Trump included in Jeffrey Epstein's birthday book (2003); Trump has denied authorship.)

== History ==
The 3D model of the sculpture

Through movie location manager Carol Flaisher, Best Friends Forever received permit to be displayed at the east end of the National Mall, across the street from the United States Capitol Building, for the duration of its installation on Tuesday, September 23, 2025, until 8:00 pm Sunday, September 28. This permit outlined that The Secret Handshake was to be notified with cause 24 hours prior to any premature removal, and the statue provided full-time security by United States Park Police (USPP).

On the morning of September 24, at around 5:30 am, several USPP vehicles arrived on-site, some noted by onlookers to be unmarked. Officers proceeded to dismantle Best Friends Forever, damaging it. Park Police told CBS through WUSA that the sculpture was removed due to not being in compliance with its permit, but did not show said permit or initially explain how it was in violation. An unidentified USPP officer was recorded telling civilians during the dismantling that the issue was due to the installation being "too big", despite there being larger and taller statues on display at the National Mall.

Flaisher told USA Today that the removal of the statue was "unbelievable", stating that she "never had this problem" in her 40-year career as a location manager. Flaisher added that she and The Secret Handshake never received any advance notices, and were not informed of the apparent permit violation until they had already reacquired the sculpture's parts and attempted repair.

On September 26, 2025, The Secret Handshake released a 3D model of the sculpture on Printables under a CC0 license, waiving all copyright and making the work public domain. A week after its removal, it was reported on October 2 during the 2025 United States federal government shutdown that the statue had been reinstalled on the National Mall. The statue was removed on October 5 upon the expiration of its permit.

== Reception ==
Commenting on the statue, Stephen Colbert on The Late Show with Stephen Colbert joked about its realism and categorized it as a "victory for free speech" on par with the suspension of Jimmy Kimmel Live! being lifted. Following the sculpture's removal, Colbert went on to sarcastically thank the United States Park Police "for protecting free speech for almost 24 hours".

== Further installations ==
In March of 2026, two further sculptures, King of the World and A Throne Fit for a King, would be installed at the National Mall, both also attributed to "The Secret Handshake" art group. In September 2026, an arcade game titled Operation Epic Furious: Nuuk ’Em All, satirizing the Greenland crisis, was created by the group, with three arcade cabinets being placed in the D.C. World War I Memorial, and one being placed in Nuuk, Greenland.

== See also ==
- 2025 in art
- 2025 in Washington, D.C.
- List of public art in Washington, D.C.
- List of sculptures of presidents of the United States
- Statues of Donald Trump
  - King of the World (sculpture)
- Jeffrey Epstein Walk of Shame
