= King of the World (sculpture) =

2026 sculpture in Washington, D.C., US

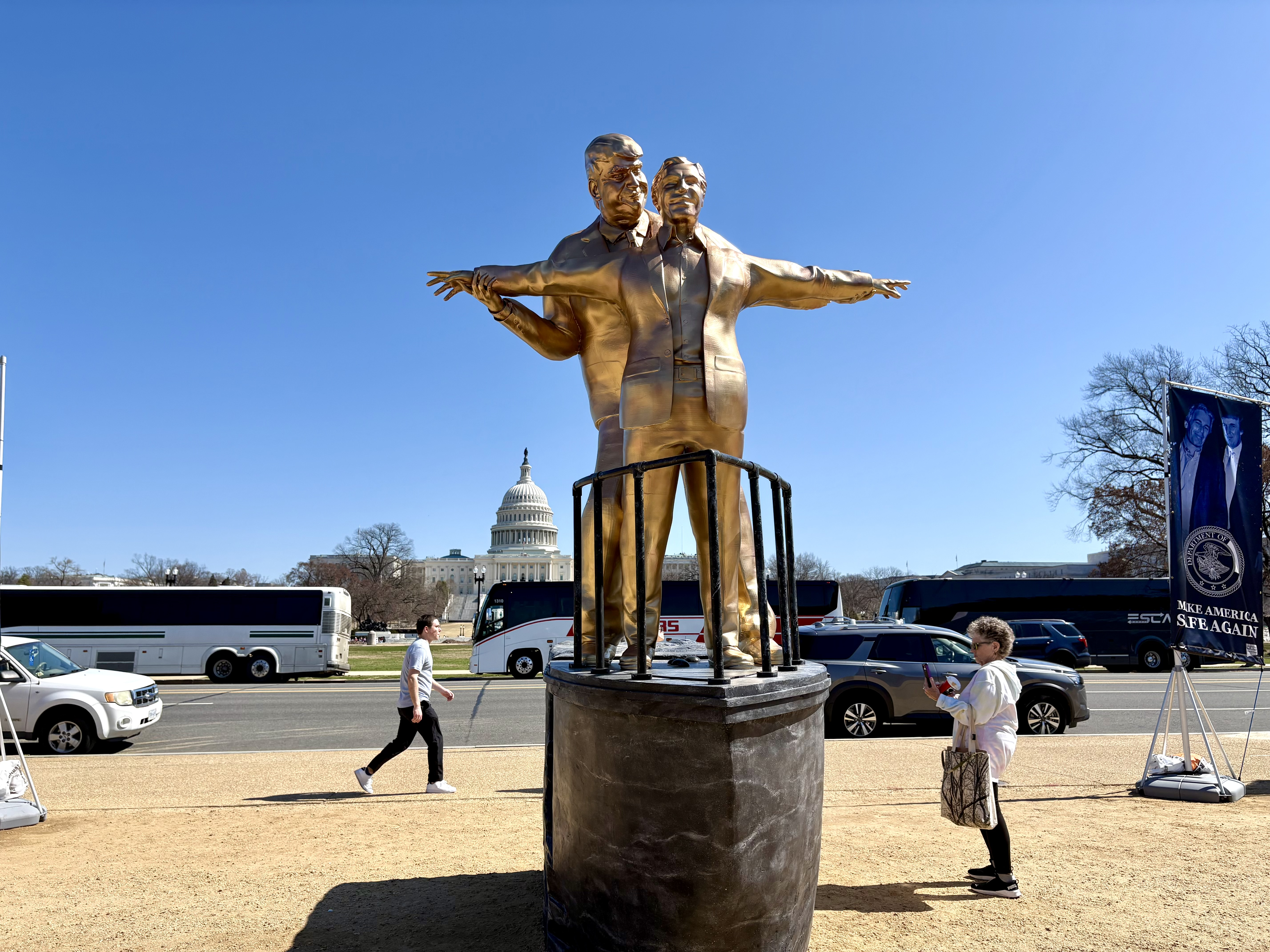
- The statue on the National Mall, March 2026
- Artist: The Secret Handshake (art group)
- Year: 2026
- Medium: sculpture
- Subject: Donald Trump; Jeffrey Epstein
- Location: Washington, D.C., United States

King of the World is a 2026 sculpture installed at the National Mall, in Washington, D.C., United States. The 12-foot-tall sculpture shows U.S. President Donald Trump and convicted sex trafficker Jeffrey Epstein, his late former friend, mimicking Jack and Rose (as portrayed by Leonardo DiCaprio and Kate Winslet, respectively) in the 1997 film Titanic. LGBTQ Nation described the work as homoerotic.

A plaque reads, "The tragic love story between Jack and Rose was built on luxurious travel, raucous parties, and secret nude sketches. This monument honors the bond between Donald Trump and Jeffrey Epstein, a friendship seemingly built on luxurious travel, raucous parties, and secret nude sketches."

The sculpture was created and installed by the anonymous group of artists known as The Secret Handshake, who also created both the Best Friends Forever sculpture featuring Trump and Epstein, and A Throne Fit for a King sculpture.

== See also ==
- Donald Trump baby balloon
- Statues of Donald Trump
  - Best Friends Forever (sculpture)
- The Donald J. Trump Enduring Flame
- Jeffrey Epstein Walk of Shame
- List of presidents of the United States
- Donald Trump in popular culture
