= A Throne Fit for a King =

2026 art installation in Washington, D.C., U.S.

- A Throne Fit for a King with the Lincoln Memorial Reflecting Pool and Washington Monument in the background
- Artist: The Secret Handshake
- Year: 2026
- Medium: Sculpture
- Dimensions: 3.0 m (10 ft)
- Location: Washington, D.C., U.S.

A Throne Fit for a King is a ten-foot-tall sculpture of a gold toilet, installed in front of the Lincoln Memorial in Washington, D.C., United States, in March 2026. The group behind the installation is called The Secret Handshake. The work is made from wood, plaster, foam, porcelain, and custom rolls of toilet paper. It measures 114 by 79 by 61 inches (290 cm × 200 cm × 150 cm).

A plaque on both sides of the throne reads: "In a time of unprecedented division, escalating conflict, and economic turmoil, President Trump focused on what truly mattered: remodeling the Lincoln Bathroom. This, his crowning achievement, is a bold reminder that the President isn't just a businessman, he's taking care of business. It stands as a tribute to an unwavering visionary who looked down, saw a problem, and painted it gold."

The Secret Handshake also created the sculptures Best Friends Forever and King of the World.

== See also ==
- 2026 in art
