= 2022 in Washington, D.C. =

- Decades: 2000s; 2010s; 2020s
- See also: History of Washington, D.C.; Historical outline of Washington, D.C.; List of years in Washington, D.C.; 2022 in the United States

The following is a list of events of the year 2022 in Washington, D.C..

== Incumbents ==
=== State government ===
- Mayor: Muriel Bowser (D)

== Events ==
Ongoing: COVID-19 pandemic in Washington, D.C.

- February 2: Washington Redskins name controversy
  - It is announced that, starting in the 2022 NFL season, the Washington Football Team will be renamed as the Washington Commanders in order to replace the Redskins name, considered a racial slur, which was retired in mid-2020 following the nationwide George Floyd protests.
- February 20: President Joe Biden holds a National Security Council meeting on the 2021–2022 Russo-Ukrainian crisis.
- March 6: A convoy of truckers inspired by the Canadian convoy protesters gather at the Capital Beltway in Washington, D.C. to call for all COVID-19 restrictions and mandates to be lifted.
- March 15: The DC Police Department arrest a suspected serial killer involved in the murders of two homeless men, and the attempted murder of three others in Washington, D.C. and New York City.
- March 22: White House Press Secretary Jen Psaki tests positive for COVID-19 for the second time.
- March 23: House Sergeant at Arms William J. Walker and Capitol physician Brian P. Monahan announce that a phased reopening of the United States Capitol will begin next week after the Capitol was closed for 2 years due to the COVID-19 pandemic.
- June 6:
  - Washington, D.C. reports a case of orthopoxvirus.
  - Transportation Secretary Pete Buttigieg tests positive for COVID-19.
- July 21: President Joe Biden tests positive for COVID-19.
- July 30: President Joe Biden tests positive for COVID-19 for a second time and will be in isolation.
- August 4: Three people are killed and a fourth person is seriously injured by a lightning strike at Lafayette Square in Washington, D.C.

== See also ==
- 2022 in the United States
