= 2023 in Washington, D.C. =

- Decades: 2000s; 2010s; 2020s
- See also: History of Washington, D.C.; Historical outline of Washington, D.C.; List of years in Washington, D.C.; 2023 in the United States

The following is a list of events of the year 2023 in Washington, D.C..

== Incumbents ==
=== State government ===
- Mayor: Muriel Bowser (D)

== Events ==
- January 7 – Killing of Karon Blake
- May 22 – 2023 Lafayette Square U-Haul crash
- June 4 – 2023 Virginia plane crash
- July 2 – 2023 White House cocaine incident
- November 4 – National March on Washington: Free Palestine
- November 14 – March for Israel

== See also ==
- 2023 in the United States
