= The Secret Handshake (art group) =

Anonymous group of artists

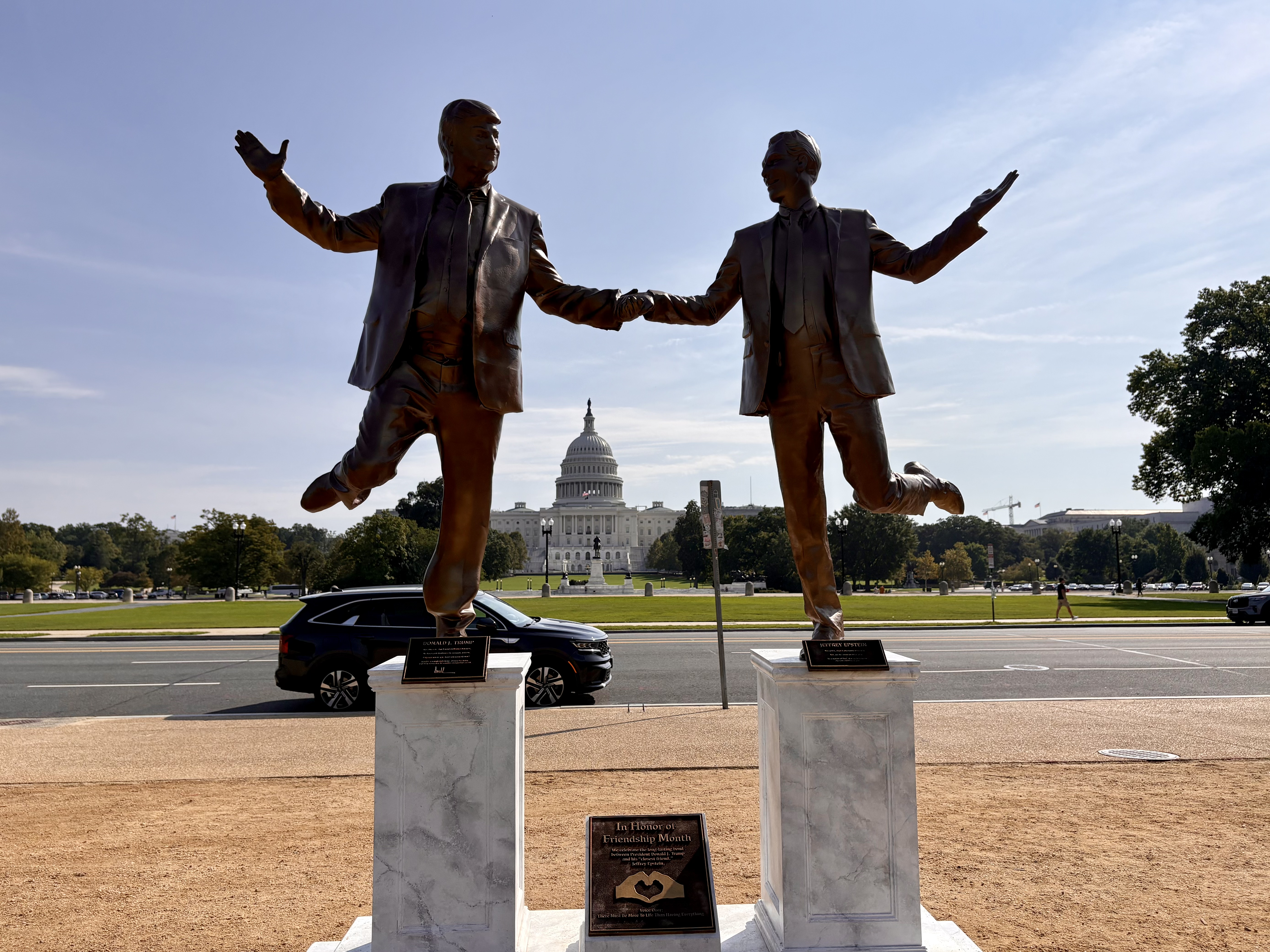
Best Friends Forever

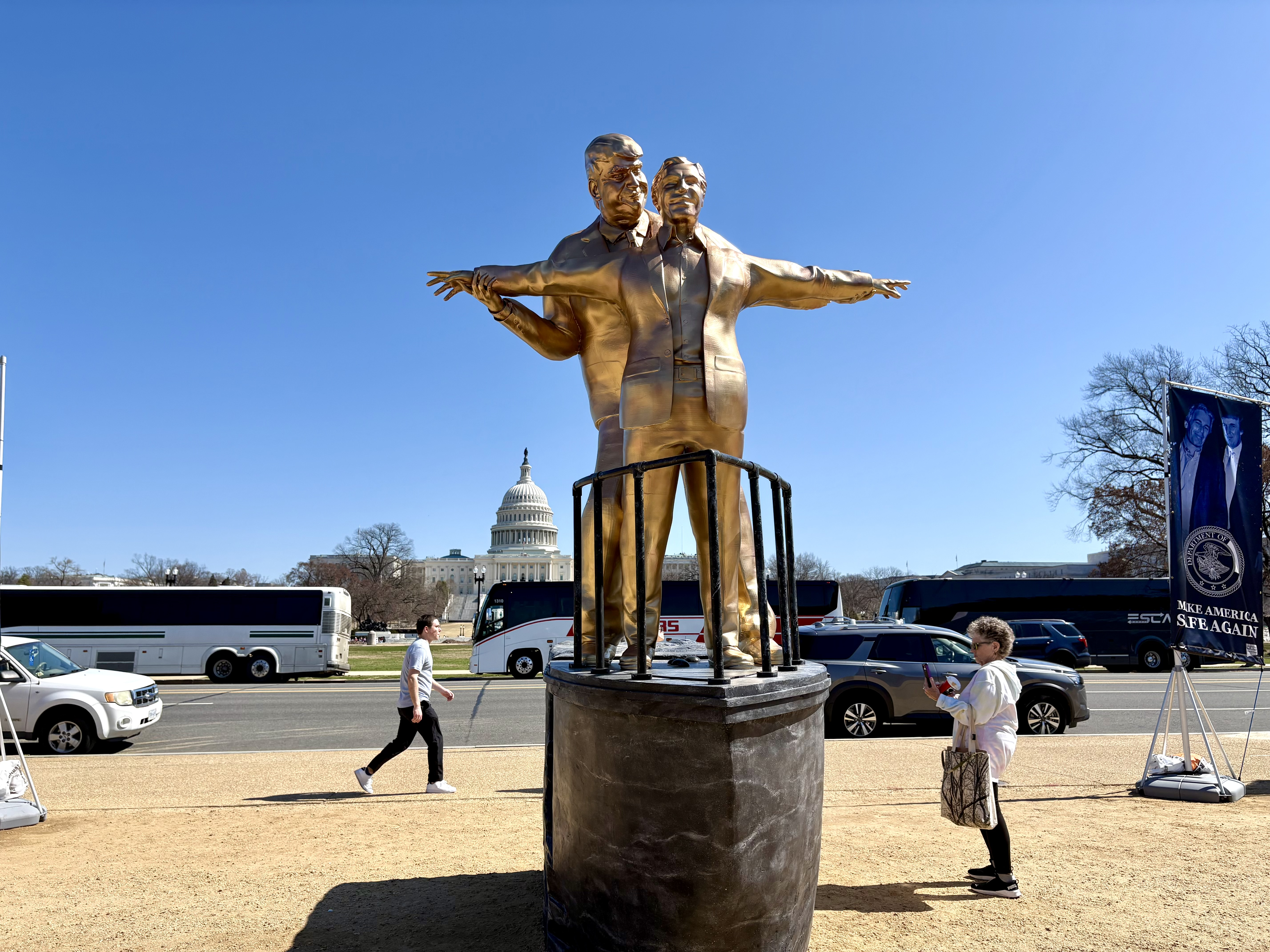
King of the World

The Secret Handshake is an anonymous group of Washington, D.C.-based activist artists, who have displayed sculptures in the capital city:

- Best Friends Forever, 23 September 2025
- King of the World, 10 March 2026
- A Throne Fit for a King, 30 March 2026, depicting the White House's Lincoln bathroom, on the National Mall
- Operation Epic Furious: Strait to Hell, 11 May 2026
- Iran War Participation Trophy, 13 July 2026
- Operation Epic Furious: Nuuk ’Em All, 28 September 2026, D.C. World War I Memorial, and Nuuk, Greenland.
- The Foot Soldier, 9 November 2026, National Mall

== See also ==
- Indecline (art group)
