= 2024 visit by Benjamin Netanyahu to the United States =

Bilateral meeting between the leaders of Israel and the United States

- Date: July 22–27, 2024
- Location: Washington, D.C., United States

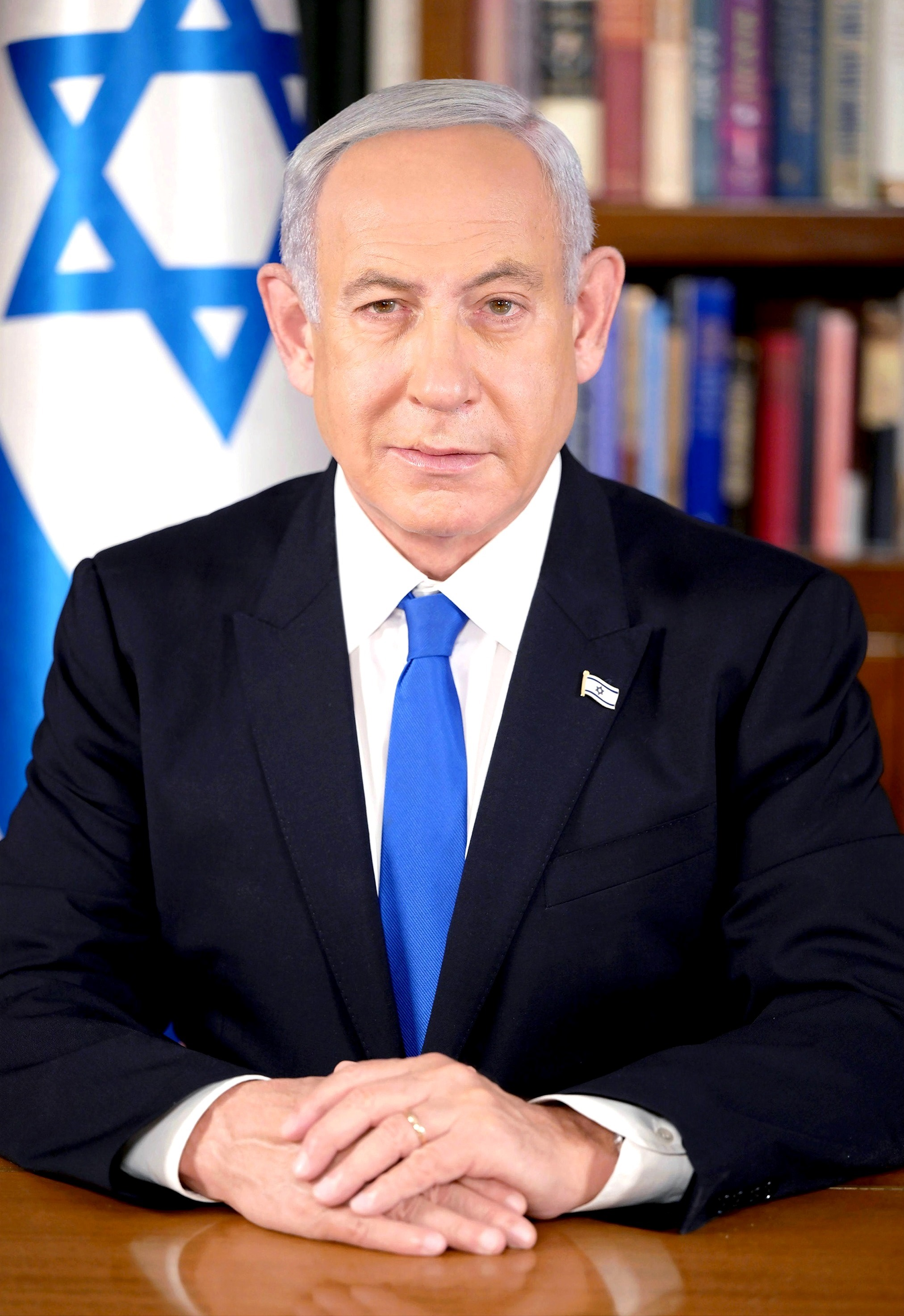
Israeli prime minister Benjamin Netanyahu

In July 2024, Prime Minister of Israel Benjamin Netanyahu visited Washington, D.C. to hold meetings with senior officials and deliver a speech to the United States Congress.

Due to Israel's handling of the ongoing Israeli invasion of the Gaza Strip, Netanyahu's visit to the U.S. was met with both political backlash and support. His speech was boycotted by 92 U.S. lawmakers (89 Democrats, 2 Independents, and 1 Republican), citing various political criticisms. The address was also met by thousands of pro-Palestinian protestors. Conversely, many Democratic and Republican politicians showcased their support for Netanyahu and Israel during the address.

The visit was cut short by a few hours due to the Majdal Shams attack.

== Background ==
Following the start of Gaza war, Israeli prime minister Benjamin Netanyahu and his government have received criticism for their handling of the war. By the time of Netanyahu's visit to the United States, more than 39,000 Palestinians in Gaza have been killed, leading to accusations of genocide. In May 2024, Karim Ahmad Khan, chief prosecutor of the International Criminal Court, announced his intentions to apply an arrest warrant against Netanyahu, on charges of war crimes and crimes against humanity.

In response to news of the pending arrest warrant, many U.S. politicians, both Republican and Democratic, reiterated their support of Netanyahu and Israel. On May 31, Mike Johnson, Chuck Schumer, Mitch McConnell, and Hakeem Jeffries all formally invited Netanyahu to speak before Congress.

== Netanyahu's Address to Congress ==
2024 Benjamin Netanyahu Address to U.S. Congress
- Date: July 24, 2024
- Time: 2:00 p.m. (EST)
- Venue: House Chamber, United States Capitol
- Location: Washington, D.C.
- Footage: C-SPAN

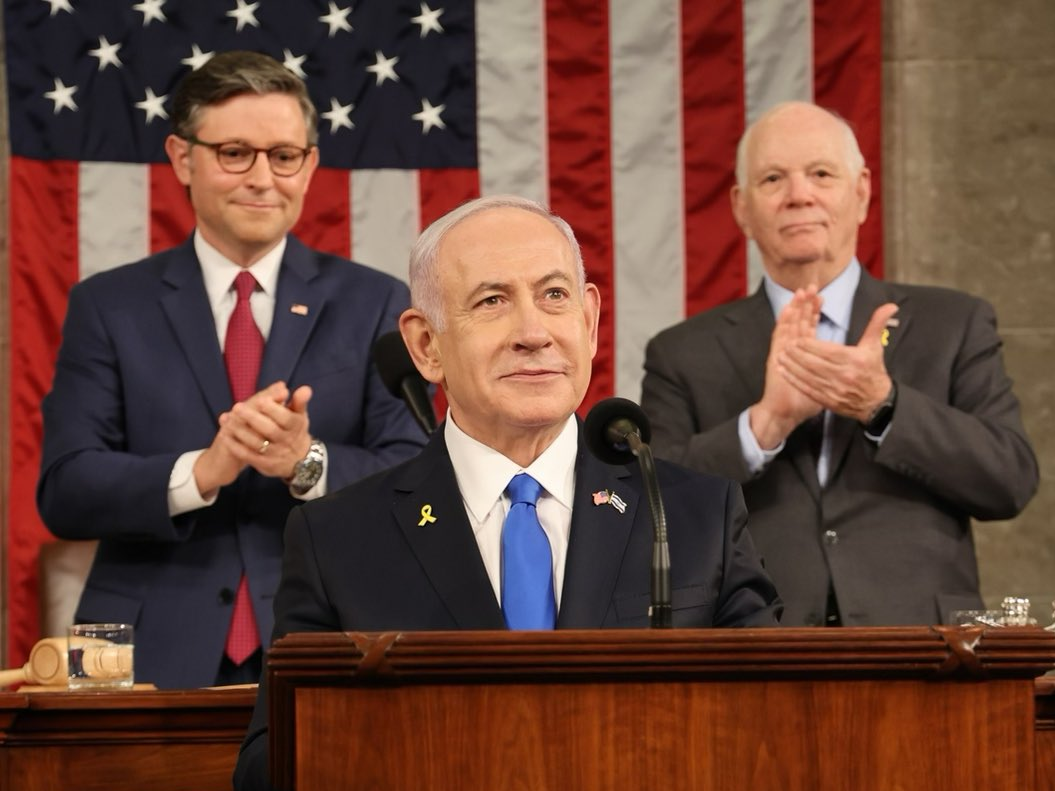
Israeli prime minister Benjamin Netanyahu addresses a joint session of Congress with House Speaker Mike Johnson and Senator Ben Cardin.

Benjamin Netanyahu addressed Congress on Wednesday, July 24, 2024. His speech lasted about 52 minutes.

Before the address, Netanyahu exchanged gifts with Republican House speaker Mike Johnson, a customary tradition. Johnson gifted Netanyahu a collection of documents and letters, including a letter written by Benzion Netanyahu, Netanyahu's father, to U.S. president Dwight D. Eisenhower; as well as a note-card from U.S. president Gerald Ford. Netanyahu gifted Johnson a shrapnel sculpture of a dove flying over the state of Israel.

During his speech, Netanyahu vowed to press forward with the war until reaching "total victory", but stated he would agree to a cease-fire if specific conditions were met. Netanyahu portrayed the war as “clash between barbarism and civilization”, attacked anti-war protesters as “Iran's useful idiots” and likened the slogan "Gays for Gaza" to "Chickens for KFC." He also praised U.S. president Joe Biden.

Netanyahu received a nearly eight-minute standing ovation upon arrival, and nearly 50 standing ovations during the speech.

=== Claims ===
During the speech, Netanyahu made several false or misleading statements. Netanyahu said "If there are Palestinians in Gaza who aren't getting enough food, it's not because Israel is blocking it. It's because Hamas is stealing it". Additionally, Netanyahu claimed that during the Rafah invasion, there were "practically no civilian deaths" during several of the IDF's operations, that the war had "one of the lowest ratios of combatants to non-combatant casualties in the history of urban warfare," and "Iran is funding and promoting anti-Israel protests in America." Furthermore, Netanyahu said the ICC's allegation that Israel is starving people of Gaza is "utter, complete nonsense" and a "fabrication." These claims have been disputed by the media, UN, experts and various NGO's working on the ground.

=== Reactions ===
Netanyahu's speech drew mixed reactions.

Democratic Representative and former House Speaker Nancy Pelosi, who did not attend the speech, attacked Netanyahu's speech, calling it "by far the worst presentation of any foreign dignitary invited and honored with the privilege of addressing the Congress of the United States." Pelosi reiterated her support of Israel, while criticizing Netanyahu and calling for a ceasefire.

Following the speech, Democratic representatives Adam Schiff and Jimmy Gomez, who both attended, called on Netanyahu to resign.

Republican reception to the speech was generally positive. However, The American Conservative was critical, with Bradley Devin writing "While Americans have long sought a way out of the Middle East, Netanyahu seems keen on keeping America in."

Responding to the concerns raised by Netanyahu regarding the assassination attempt by Iran on former president and 2024 Republican presidential candidate Donald Trump, Trump published a post alongside a video clip on his social media platform, Truth Social, invoking the possibility of his assassination and calling for the annihilation of Iran in such an event. "If they do 'assassinate President Trump,' which is always a possibility, I hope that America obliterates Iran, wipes it off the face of the Earth. If that does not happen, American Leaders will be considered 'gutless' cowards!" he wrote, echoing rhetoric reminiscent of his most incendiary statements while in office.

== Congressional boycotts, protests, and absences ==
=== Boycotts ===
Ahead of Netanyahu's address, many Congressional Representatives and several Senators announced their intentions to boycott the address.

Eventually 92 lawmakers boycotted the address as a form of protest. The list includes 89 Democrats, 2 Independents (Angus King and Bernie Sanders), and 1 Republican (Thomas Massie).

List of politicians who boycotted Netanyahu's Congressional address

U.S. Senators

1. Laphonza Butler (D–CA)
2. Ben Cardin (D–MD)
3. Tom Carper (D–DE)
4. Tammy Duckworth (D–IL)
5. Dick Durbin (D–IL)
6. Martin Heinrich (D–NM)
7. Mazie Hirono (D–HI)
8. Angus King (I–ME)
9. Ben Ray Lujan (D–NM)
10. Ed Markey (D–MA)
11. Jeff Merkley (D–OR)
12. Patty Murray (D–WA)
13. Jack Reed (D–RI)
14. Bernie Sanders (I–VT)
15. Brian Schatz (D–HI)
16. Jeanne Shaheen (D–NH)
17. Chris Van Hollen (D–MD)
18. Elizabeth Warren (D–MA)
19. Peter Welch (D–VT)
20. Sheldon Whitehouse (D–RI)
21. Ron Wyden (D–OR)

U.S. Representatives

1. Becca Balint (D–VT)
2. Nanette Barragan (D–CA)
3. Ami Bera (D–CA)
4. Don Beyer (D–VA)
5. Lisa Blunt Rochester (D–DE)
6. Suzanne Bonamici (D–OR)
7. Jamaal Bowman (D–NY)
8. Cori Bush (D–MO)
9. Andre Carson (D–IN)
10. Greg Casar (D–TX)
11. Joaquín Castro (D–TX)
12. Judy Chu (D–CA)
13. Jim Clyburn (D–SC)
14. Steve Cohen (D–TN)
15. Madeleine Dean (D–PA)
16. Diana DeGette (D–CO)
17. Suzan DelBene (D–WA)
18. Mark DeSaulnier (D–CA)
19. Rosa DeLauro (D–CT)
20. Debbie Dingell (D–MI)
21. Lloyd Doggett (D–TX)
22. Veronica Escobar (D–TX)
23. Anna Eshoo (D–CA)
24. Teresa Leger Fernandez (D–NM)
25. Valerie Foushee (D–NC)
26. Maxwell Frost (D–FL)
27. Ruben Gallego (D–AZ)
28. John Garamendi (D–CA)
29. Chuy Garcia (D–IL)
30. Robert Garcia (D–CA)
31. Al Green (D–TX)
32. Raul Grijalva (D–AZ)
33. Chrissy Houlahan (D–PA)
34. Jared Huffman (D–CA)
35. Sara Jacobs (D–CA)
36. Pramila Jayapal (D–WA)
37. Hank Johnson (D–GA)
38. Ro Khanna (D–CA)
39. Rick Larsen (D–WA)
40. Barbara Lee (D–CA)
41. Summer Lee (D–PA)
42. Zoe Lofgren (D–CA)
43. Stephen Lynch (D–MA)
44. Thomas Massie (R–KY)
45. Doris Matsui (D–CA)
46. Betty McCollum (D–MN)
47. Jim McGovern (D–MA)
48. Kweisi Mfume (D–MD)
49. Gwen Moore (D–WI)
50. Kevin Mullin (D–CA)
51. Alexandria Ocasio-Cortez (D–NY)
52. Ilhan Omar (D–MN)
53. Nancy Pelosi (D–CA)
54. Mary Peltola (D–AK)
55. Chellie Pingree (D–ME)
56. Mark Pocan (D–WI)
57. Katie Porter (D–CA)
58. Ayanna Pressley (D–MA)
59. Delia Ramirez (D–IL)
60. Jan Schakowsky (D–IL)
61. Adam Smith (D–WA)
62. Melanie Stansbury (D–NM)
63. Mark Takano (D–CA)
64. Mike Thompson (D–CA)
65. Bennie Thompson (D–MS)
66. Jill Tokuda (D–HI)
67. Paul Tonko (D–NY)
68. Lori Trahan (D–MA)
69. Gabe Vasquez (D–NM)
70. Nydia Velázquez (D–NY)
71. Bonnie Watson Coleman (D–NJ)

=== Protests by members of congress ===
Congresswoman Rashida Tlaib, who is Palestinian-American, attended the address. For several minutes during Netanyahu's address, Tlaib held up a sign that read "WAR CRIMINAL" on one side and "GUILTY OF GENOCIDE" on the other.

=== Absences not intended to be a protest ===
Democratic US vice president Kamala Harris (the ex-officio president of the United States Senate) and Republican Senator JD Vance did not attend the address. However, their absences were not explicit political protests, with both citing prior engagements. Harris stated her absence was due to her campaigning for president in the 2024 election, and she privately met with Netanyahu later. Vance similarly cited his campaign duties as Donald Trump's running mate in election. Both reiterated their support for Israel in spite of their absence.

Senator Robert Menendez was convicted of bribery the week before the address and announced his resignation from the Senate the day before the address. Although officially still a Senator until the resignation became effective a month later, Menendez had not been in Washington between the conviction and the address.

Congressmembers Emanuel Cleaver, Dwight Evans, and Bill Pascrell were unable to attend due to medical reasons, with Cleaver having tested positive for COVID-19. Pascrell died less than a month after the address. Senator Tim Kaine stated that he was unable to attend, due to a previously scheduled commitment in Virginia.

== Other meetings ==
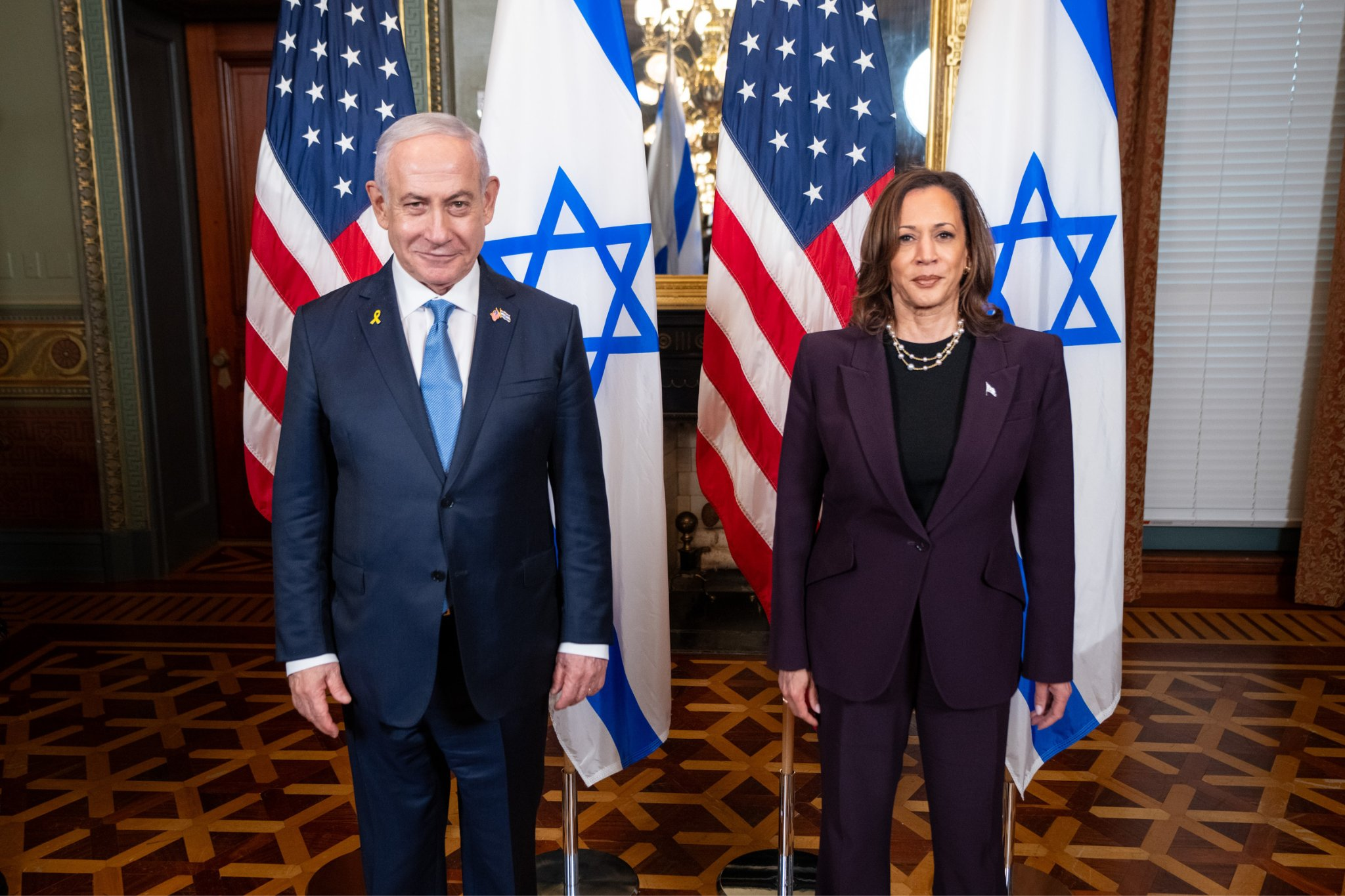
White House meeting between Vice President Harris and Prime Minister Netanyahu on July 25

Despite Harris' absence at the congressional address, Netanyahu held a private meeting with her during his visit. During the visit, Harris reportedly pressed Netanyahu to reach a cease-fire.

Netanyahu also announced plans to meet with then-former U.S. president Donald Trump during his visit; Trump was also the Republican nominee in the 2024 presidential election.

== Public protests in Washington D.C. ==
On 23 July, hundreds of Jewish Voice for Peace protestors held a sit-in protest inside the United States Capitol; 400 of these protestors were arrested.

On 24 July 2024, thousands of demonstrators gathered in Washington, D.C., to protest Israeli prime minister Benjamin Netanyahu's visit to the United States and his joint address made in Congress. The main demonstration was organized by the ANSWER Coalition, the Palestinian Youth Movement, the People's Forum, and the International Jewish Anti-Zionist Network, among other groups. Members of Neturei Karta, an anti-Zionist Jewish sect, also participated.

Prior to the speech, groups of protesters demonstrated near the Capitol before police pushed them away using pepper spray after they reported that sections of the crowd grew violent while failing to obey police orders. Many of the protesters turned away from the Capitol would gather in front of Washington Union Station to demonstrate. Six intersections leading to the Capitol were blocked by protestors attempting to block Netanyahu's route. At least four protesters were apprehended by police, with one officer taking and throwing aside a Palestinian flag held by a woman. The United States Capitol Police deployed pepper spray during one instance of the crowd "starting to become violent" and refusing to obey police commands, two protesters were treated for pepper spray but no other injuries were reported. Several American flags were replaced with Palestinian flags at Union Station Plaza and in Columbus Circle, and at least one American flag was burned. Protesters heavily defaced the Freedom Bell outside of Union Station with spray paint and markers, writing messages including "End colonialism", "Hind's Hall", "Fuck America", "Welcome to the Intifada", "Anarchy 2025", and "This is Biden's legacy" (with "this" referring to the Gaza genocide).

Protesters burned an effigy of Netanyahu, while a papier-mâché effigy of United States president Joe Biden was presented to the group of demonstrators bearing devil horns and bloodied hands, representing his policies said to have enabled and made possible Netanyahu's military actions and war crimes towards the Gaza Strip. Other demonstrators climbed onto the Columbus Fountain near Union Station and used spray paint to write graffiti onto the monument. Writings included large lettering in red spray paint stating "Hamas is coming" and green paint stating "Free Gaza". Other messages written on the sculpture included "Long live the resistance", "All Zionists are bastards", "Fuck Fascism!" and "Free Palestine", as well as several inverted red triangles representing the Palestinian flag. Demonstrators also spray painted several other statues in Columbus Circle with the words "Free Gaza".

Protesters at Washington Union Station removed 3 American Flags and replaced them with Palestinian flags during the address. Other incidents involved the burning of American Flags, and the use of Hamas slogans, such as “Qassam, Qassam, make us proud,” cheering the Al-Qassam Brigades, which is Hamas's military wing. Kamala Harris condemned the "despicable acts and dangerous hate-fueled rhetoric" by demonstrators who rioted outside the capitol expressing support for Hamas and burning American flags.

About 100 protesters affiliated with UnXeptable, a pro-Israel but anti-Netanyahu group, also rallied at a park near the Washington Union Station. In contrast with all the other protests, the protestors in this protest waved Israeli flags. Rabbi Jill Jacobs was one of the speakers who addressed that rally.

A total of 23 protestors were arrested on the day of Netanyahu's address to Congress: Fifteen by the DC Metro Police and eight by the US Parks Police.

=== Watergate Hotel ===
A group called Palestinian Youth Movement released a video to social media showing hundreds of maggots and crickets crawling on a conference table at the Watergate Hotel, where Netanyahu was staying. In addition to the maggots seen on the video, the group claimed that the bugs were released in multiple floors. In the video, fire alarms can be heard in the background which the group claimed were set off to ensure that Netanyahu had "no peace".

=== In the Capitol ===
United States Capitol Police arrested six guests of Benjamin Netanyahu who attended the speech in the House Gallery and removed outer layers of clothing to expose t-shirts with the message "SEAL THE DEAL NOW" (with "the deal" meaning a ceasefire and hostage exchange deal in the Gaza War). The six were charged with disrupting congress. The arrested guests were family members of individuals who were being held hostage in Gaza by Hamas, and they were arrested for violating a statute making it a crime to "parade, demonstrate, or picket within any of the Capitol Buildings." Earlier in the day, Speaker of the United States House of Representatives Mike Johnson warned that anyone who is perceived as disrupting Netanyahu's speech will be arrested.

== See also ==
- United States support for Israel in the Gaza war
- List of international prime ministerial trips made by Benjamin Netanyahu
