= Killing of Karon Blake =

Fatal 2023 shooting

Coordinates: 38.9371°N 76.9915°W

- Location: Brookland (Washington, D.C.)
- Date: January 7, 2023; Between 3am and 4am
- Weapon: Gun
- Deaths: 1
- Accused: Jason Michael Lewis

In the early morning of January 7, 2023, in Washington, D.C., the United States, Jason Lewis shot and killed 13-year-old Karon Blake.

Lewis, a Black 41-year-old father of four and longtime D. C. Parks and Recreation employee, had stepped onto his patio to investigate a possible home invasion when he saw Blake and two others breaking into parked vehicles along his street. In the seconds following a brief confrontation with the group, Lewis opened fire, fatally wounding Blake.

After several weeks of investigation, Lewis was arrested and charged with murder in second degree while armed. He was found guilty of voluntary manslaughter among other charges in August 2024 and sentenced to 12 ½ years in January 2025.

== Shooting ==
=== Official report ===
The shooting took place around 3:00 am on Saturday, January 7, 2023, in the 1000 block of Quincy Street, Northeast, an area of the Brookland neighborhood. The Metropolitan Police Department (MPDC) arrived on the scene at approximately 3:56 am. When police officers arrived, they found an older black male performing cardiopulmonary resuscitation (CPR) on a juvenile black male, shot twice in his side, lying in the shrubbery between 1031 and 1033 Quincy Street, Northeast, suffering from gunshot wounds. The older male would later be identified as a nearby homeowner, 41-year-old Jason Lewis of 1033 Quincy Street, Northeast, a government employee, and the younger as 13-year-old Karon Blake, a student at Brookland Middle School. Emergency medical services (EMS) transported Blake to a nearby hospital, where he was later pronounced dead at 4:39 am.

=== Lewis' account ===
Lewis told authorities that he had woken in the night to noises outside his home and worried that someone might be trying to break into his home. He went downstairs to investigate the noise, taking his firearm, which he legally owned and was legally authorized to carry, with him. He opened his door to see several people dressed in black, whom he described as "youngsters," and yelled at them, asking them what they were doing after seeing them tampering with nearby vehicles. One person, whom he identified as Blake, ran towards him as he stood in the courtyard of his home and he opened fire, shooting twice. Lewis' girlfriend called 9-1-1 while Lewis began administering CPR after Blake collapsed.

=== Video footage and additional information ===
A nearby camera captured much of the incident on video. Blake, along with two other juvenile males, arrived on the scene in a stolen Kia, which police referred to as a getaway vehicle, and began tampering with parked vehicles in the area. Lewis, armed, stepped onto his front patio and fired a shot at the parked car, which contained the other two juvenile males. Police said that when initially questioned, Lewis never mentioned firing at the car. After the Lewis' initial shot, Karon, the only male not in the car, began running in the direction of Lewis' home, though police said he never stepped onto Lewis' property. Lewis fired three shots. Blake can be heard saying "I'm only 12," and apologizing to Lewis for his actions. Police chief Robert Contee expressed sympathy for the other two males involved, who were seen on video fleeing the scene, who remain unidentified.

== Aftermath ==
On Tuesday, January 10, 2023, Blake's mother, Londen Blake, created a fundraiser on the crowdfunding platform GoFundMe to help cover the cost of Blake's funeral and burial expenses. The fundraiser raised $35,879.

On Wednesday, January 11, 2023, D. C. Mayor Muriel Bowser, who is African American, told the press the party involved in the shooting was a government employee and that they'd been placed on administrative leave. Despite public outcry, Bowser declined to identify the party but did say that he was not a police officer when asked about his occupation. In response to demands from the public to identify the party, police chief Robert Contee, also African American, "We normally do not identify people in similar situations unless we have a warrant in hand for that person or unless there's a person who we are trying to identify... This is not what we're dealing with here." Contee warned the public that there was a lot of misinformation about the shooting going around the community.

On Saturday, January 14, 2023, a vigil was held in Blake's honor.

On Monday, January 23, 2023, a funeral service for Blake was held at Israel Baptist Church, located at 1251 Saratoga Avenue in Washington, D.C. News outlets reported hundreds of mourners, including local politicians and elected officials, were in attendance.

On Tuesday, January 31, 2023, U. S. Attorney Matthew M. Graves announced that a warrant had been issued for Jason Michael Lewis, a 41-year-old African American resident who'd been employed by the District of Columbia's Parks and Recreation Department for 18 years, in the death of Blake. Lewis had turned himself into the Metropolitan Police Department that day at 8:00 am and he appeared in court later that afternoon. Lewis was charged with second-degree murder, a Class A felony in the District of Columbia, and ordered to be held without bond while he awaits his trial. Blake's family members were present for Lewis' arraignment and Stephanie Ramirez of Fox 5 News (WTTG) reported they were "quietly celebrating in the court room" after the judge ruled Lewis would be held without bond. Lewis is scheduled to appear in court on Wednesday, February 15, 2023. He entered a plea of not guilty. The firearm involved in the shooting, described as Lewis' only firearm, was confiscated and authorities announced plans to revoke his CCW permit.

On Wednesday, February 1, 2023, Londen Blake addressed the press for the first time since Lewis' arrest, saying that she hopes Lewis is convicted.

On Thursday, March 9, 2023, Judge Anthony Epstein of the DC Superior Court ordered that Lewis be released while awaiting trial, saying there was insufficient evidence that he was a danger to the community.

On Friday, January 12, 2024, Lewis' defense attorney, Edward Ungvarsky, was granted a continuance by Judge Epstein. The trial was rescheduled for Monday, August 5, 2024. Epstein also agreed to modify the conditions of Lewis' release, removing the home confinement requirement and setting a curfew of 10 p.m. to 6 a.m. The charges against Lewis are second-degree murder while armed, three counts of possession of a firearm during a crime of violence, and two counts of assault with a dangerous weapon.

On Friday, August 16, 2024, Lewis was cleared of the second-degree murder charge but found guilty of three counts of possession of a firearm during a crime of violence, two counts of assault with a dangerous weapon, and one count of voluntary manslaughter while armed, committed against a minor after a jury rejected his claim of self-defense.

On Friday, January 10, 2025, the United States Attorney's Office for the District of Columbia reported that Judge Epstein had sentenced Lewis to 12 ½ years, the minimum recommended sentence for his charges and less than half of the 25-year sentence prosecutors Jeffrey Wojcik and Shauna Payyappilly had sought. He faced a maximum sentence of 45 years. Upon release, Lewis will be supervised for 5 years. In response to the District Attorney's Office confirmation that Blake and his acquaintances had broken into vehicles at the time of Blake's death, D. C. Council Member Christina Henderson said "Property is not greater than life. Karon should be alive today," and Council Member Zachary Parker said "No car or material possession is worth a life – under any circumstance.

== Legal overview ==
Lewis was charged with murder in the second degree while armed (§ 22–2103). Per the Code of the District of Columbia, individuals convicted of murder in the second degree may face life in prison and those convicted of murder in the second degree while armed receive a minimum sentence of 40 years in prison but only if certain circumstances apply to the situation. Murder in the second degree has the potential to be reduced to manslaughter, which carries a maximum sentence of 30 years in prison, in the absence of malice aforethought. While Lewis argued he acted in self-defense, the District of Columbia does not have a stand-your-ground law and case law allows for a jury to consider an individual's failure to retreat when determining whether or not their use of force is justifiable.

== See also ==
- Stand-your-ground law
