= 2025 in Washington, D.C. =

- Decades: 2000s; 2010s; 2020s
- See also: History of Washington, D.C.; Historical outline of Washington, D.C.; List of years in Washington, D.C.; 2025 in the United States

The following is a list of events of the year 2025 in Washington, D.C..

== Incumbents ==
=== District government ===
- Mayor: Muriel Bowser (D)

== Events ==
=== January ===
- January 3 – The 119th United States Congress meets for the first time in Washington, D.C.
- January 9 – Death and state funeral of Jimmy Carter
- January 20 – Second inauguration of Donald Trump: Donald Trump is inaugurated as the 47th president of the United States with the event taking place inside the Capital Rotunda due to freezing weather.

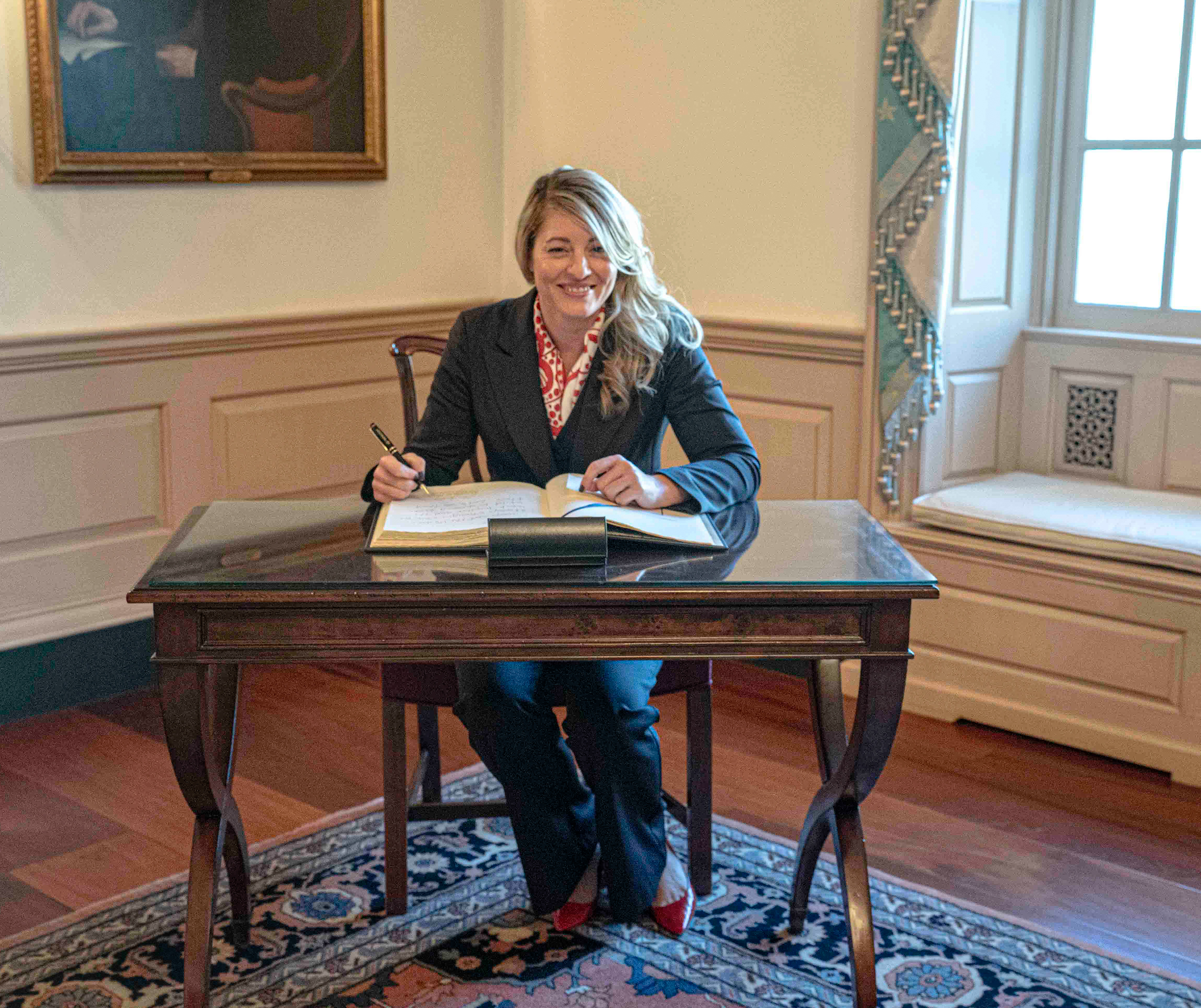
January 29: Canadian Foreign Minister Mélanie Joly visits the Department of State.

- January 29 – 2025 Potomac River mid-air collision

=== March ===
- March 7–11 – The 2025 CAA men's basketball tournament is held at the CareFirst Arena, with UNC Wilmington winning.
- March 31–April 1 – Senator Cory Booker (D-NJ) delivers the longest speech in United States Senate history, surpassing Strom Thurmond's 1957 filibuster. The speech, which condemns President Trump, Elon Musk, and the Department of Government Efficiency, starts at 7 pm on March 31 and ends on April 1 at 8:05 pm, lasting 25 hours and 5 minutes.

=== April ===
- April 28
  - The annual White House Correspondents' Dinner is held at the Washington Hilton.
  - Georgetown's Executive Branch club, co-founded by Donald Trump Jr., holds their launch party.

=== May ===
- May 19 – The Trump administration agrees to pay $5 million to the family of Ashli Babbitt, who was shot and killed by a Capitol Police officer during the January 6 United States Capitol attack in 2021.
- May 21 – Two staff members of the Israeli Embassy are shot and killed outside an event held by the American Jewish Committee. A 30-year-old man is arrested at the scene.

=== June ===
- June 13 – 60 protesters, most military veterans, are arrested at the Capitol during a protest against the following day's army parade.
- June 14:
  - The DC Defenders beat the Michigan Panthers 58–34 to win the 2025 UFL championship game.
  - United States Army 250th Anniversary Parade: A military parade is held in Washington to commemorate the 250th anniversary of the United States Army's founding. The parade coincides with President Trump's 79th birthday and Flag Day. Mass protests against the parade are held in other parts of the country.

=== July ===
- July 2 – 21-year-old Eric Tarpinian-Jachym, an intern for Representative Ron Estes (R-KS), is killed in a drive-by shooting in Northeast D.C. Tarpinian-Jachym is believed to have been a bystander. A woman and a teenage boy are injured in the shooting.

=== August ===
- August 4 – The National Park Service announces a statue of Albert Pike, a confederate general and freemason, will be restored to its prior location at the Albert Pike Memorial. The statue had been torn down by protesters on Juneteenth in 2020.
- August 10 — An employee of the Justice Department throws a submarine sandwich at a federal paramilitary agent and is charged with assault. Federal prosecutors fail to secure an indictment from a grand jury.
- August 11 – President Trump announces he is federalizing the Metropolitan Police Department of the District of Columbia and sending National Guard troops to the city.
- August 19 – The Department of Justice opens an investigation into whether the Metropolitan Police Department falsified crime data to make it appear lower.
- August 27 – The Trump administration seizes control of Washington Union Station from Amtrak.

=== September ===
- September 4 – Washington, D.C. sues the Trump administration over their deployment of the National Guard in the city.
- September 5 – Trump orders the removal of the White House Peace Vigil, an anti-nuclear weaponry protest tent present across the street from the White House since 1981.
- September 6 – Several thousand people protest the deployment of National Guard troops to Washington in the "We Are All D.C." march.
- September 11
  - The order federalizing D.C.'s police force lapses, and control is returned to the city. Members of the National Guard remain in the city.
  - A man is detained by police for following National Guard members while playing The Imperial March, Darth Vader's theme from Star Wars.

=== October ===
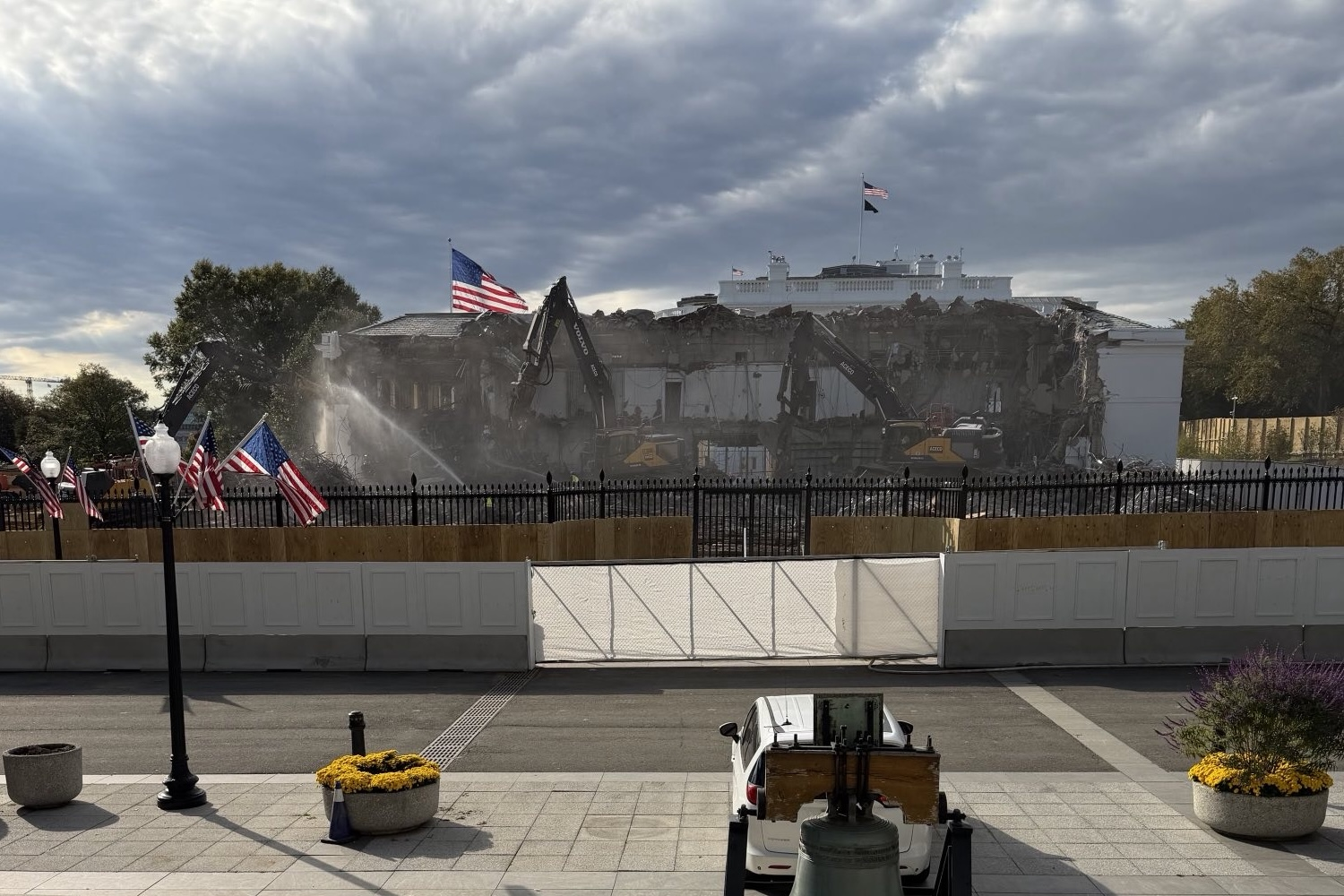
October 21: The East Wing of the White House is demolished.

- October 20–23 – The existing East Wing of the White House is demolished as part of Trump's plan to construct a modernized East Wing with a state ballroom.
- October 21 – A man is arrested for driving a car into a security gate outside the White House.

=== November ===
- November 6 – A former Justice Department employee who threw a sandwich at federal officers in August is found not guilty of misdemeanor assault.
- November 26 – Two National Guardsmen are shot near the White House. A suspect is taken into custody.

=== December ===
- December 4 – The FBI arrests a Virginia man suspected of planting pipe bombs outside the DNC and RNC buildings on January 5, 2021.
- December 6 – Trump presents the 2025 Kennedy Center Honorees with their medals in a ceremony at the Oval Office. The honorees are Michael Crawford, Gloria Gaynor, Kiss, Sylvester Stallone, and George Strait.
- December 13 – John Cena officially retires from professional wrestling at WWE Saturday Night's Main Event XLII, ending his 26-year wrestling career.
- December 18 – The Kennedy Center board of trustees votes to rename the center to the Trump-Kennedy Center. However, the name cannot be officially changed without a vote from congress. Despite this, Trump's name is added to the signage the next day.
- December 20 – A mock funeral is held for the penny, the production of which was discontinued in November, at the Lincoln Memorial.
- December 31 – The Trump administration terminates the lease between the National Links Trust and the National Park Service that allows the Trust to manage and operate the three municipal golf courses in Washington. The move effectively moves control of the golf courses to the federal government.

== See also ==
- 2025 in the United States
