= 2023 White House cocaine incident =

Discovery of cocaine in residence of US president

- Date: July 2, 2023
- Location: White House, Washington, D.C., United States
- Cause: Discovery of a small plastic bag with cocaine
- Outcome: Evacuation; Investigation; No charges or arrests

On July 2, 2023, the United States Secret Service found a small plastic bag containing less than a gram of powder cocaine inside the White House. The initial discovery prompted an evacuation of the White House. President Joe Biden and his family were at Camp David in Maryland at the time the cocaine was discovered. The Secret Service initiated an investigation as to how the cocaine entered the White House. The investigation yielded no forensic evidence and the Secret Service could not narrow below 500 the number of staff or visitors who may have left the cocaine; the investigation was closed after eleven days.

== Investigation ==
=== Discovery ===
While conducting routine patrol of the White House, Secret Service agents found a small, clear plastic bag containing white powder.

At 8:45 p.m., as a precautionary measure, the White House complex was evacuated while the DC FEMS conducted tests on the powder. DC FEMS reported that the substance was located in the library, and an on-scene analysis identified it as cocaine. Subsequent reports said the cocaine was discovered in a heavily trafficked vestibule of the West Wing near the West Executive street lobby, an area accessible to tour groups. The drug was specifically found in one of the cubbies that visitors use to store mobile phones before entering the West Wing.

=== Investigation ===
Testing by the National Biodefense Analysis and Countermeasures Center found that the powder discovered was cocaine; it tested negative for biothreats. The FBI Laboratory also did extensive chemical and forensics testing. Neither latent fingerprints nor a DNA sample was found. Two senior law enforcement officials told CBS News that the FBI analysis found 207.6 mg (.007 ounces) of cocaine.

The Secret Service ended the investigation on July 13 without identifying a subject. Video surveillance cameras are located in the general area, but not aimed directly at the cubbies where the drug was discovered. A large number of people transit the area where the cocaine was found, including tourists, visitors, staffers, facilities operations workers, and military personnel. Hundreds of people passed through over the weekend before the bag's discovery. Investigators believe that the cocaine was most likely left by a tourist or visitor. There were tours on the day the drugs were found, as well as on each of the two preceding days.

== Reactions ==
=== White House ===
President Joe Biden also stated that it is "incredibly important" for the Secret Service to determine how the cocaine got there. National Security Advisor Jake Sullivan told reporters that the Situation Room had been under construction for months, and the only people going in and out of that room were construction workers.

Karine Jean-Pierre, the White House Press Secretary, said that the cocaine was found in a highly trafficked area of the White House and that the Biden family "were at Camp David. They were not here Friday". This was contradicted by a Politico reporter who observed the Biden family depart the White House Friday evening.

=== Criticism ===
The culprit for the cocaine has not been identified, but media and political figures used the story as a source for innuendo about the president's son Hunter Biden, at the time in recovery from drug addiction.

Former President Donald Trump, in posts on his social media site Truth Social, baselessly claimed that the cocaine was "for the use of ... Hunter & Joe Biden" and suggested that Hunter Biden be executed. He attacked Jack Smith, the special counsel leading investigations into his conduct, writing: "Has Deranged Jack Smith, the crazy, Trump hating Special Prosecutor, been seen in the area of the COCAINE? He looks like a crackhead to me!" Florida governor Ron DeSantis, a candidate for the 2024 Republican presidential nomination, disparaged the Biden administration over the discovery, saying, "I've long believed, I think a lot of us have believed that the Biden administration's been blowing it on a lot of fronts. But I guess it's a little bit more literal than even I had thought".

Trump's former press secretary, Kayleigh McEnany said, "For it to be Hunter Biden, he left on Friday, he was at Camp David, there is no way, it is inconceivable to think cocaine could sit for a 72-hour-period so I would rule him out at this point."

Republican Senator Tom Cotton wrote to Secret Service Director Kimberly Cheatle on July 5, asking where the cocaine was found, how often illegal drugs have been found, and whether the Secret Service will make an arrest if a subject is identified. Cotton also asked if the White House is secure and if not, what the plan is to correct security flaws, as well as statistics on K-9 screenings, details on security audits, and a list of people not subject to full security screening. James Comer, Republican Chair of the House Oversight Committee, sent a letter to Cheatle requesting a briefing.

=== Ongoing ===
The investigation was reopened in 2025 by the Trump administration. Hunter Biden denied responsibility during an interview with the YouTuber Andrew Callaghan in July 2025, saying he had "not touched a drop of alcohol or a drug" since June 2019. "Why would I bring cocaine into the White House and stick it into a cubby outside of the situation room in the West Wing?"

== See also ==
- Cocaine in the United States
