= 2024 in Washington, D.C. =

- Decades: 2000s; 2010s; 2020s
- See also: History of Washington, D.C.; Historical outline of Washington, D.C.; List of years in Washington, D.C.; 2024 in the United States

The following is a list of events of the year 2024 in Washington, D.C..

== Incumbents ==
=== State government ===
- Mayor: Muriel Bowser (D)

== Events ==
- February 6 – The U.S. Court of Appeals in Washington, D.C. rules that former president Donald Trump does not have presidential immunity and can therefore be prosecuted for allegedly attempting to overturn the results of the 2020 presidential election.
- February 25 – Self-immolation of Aaron Bushnell: An active-duty United States Air Force member sets himself on fire outside the Israeli embassy in Washington, D.C. as a form of protest against the Israeli invasion of the Gaza Strip and dies later that day.
- March 3 – Former U.S. ambassador to the United Nations Nikki Haley wins the Washington, D.C. primary, making it her first win in the Republican Party contest.
- May 8 – A statue of the late African American civil rights leader Daisy Bates is unveiled at the U.S. Capitol's National Statuary Hall Collection in Washington, D.C., representing the state of Arkansas.
- July 9 – 2024 Washington summit: The 33rd NATO summit begins in Washington, D.C.
- July 23 – Thousands of anti-war protestors led by Jewish Voice for Peace stage a sit-in at a congressional office building in Washington D.C., ahead of Israeli prime minister Benjamin Netanyahu's visit, with over 400 people, including rabbis, being arrested by Capitol Police.
- July 24 – July 2024 protest in Washington, D.C: A series of protests occur across Washington, D.C., to protest a speech given by Israeli prime minister Benjamin Netanyahu to a joint session of the United States Congress.
- November 13 – Outgoing President Joe Biden meets with President-elect Donald Trump in the White House and pledges a peaceful transition of power.

== See also ==
- 2024 in the United States
