= Wing of Zion =

Government transport aircraft of Israel

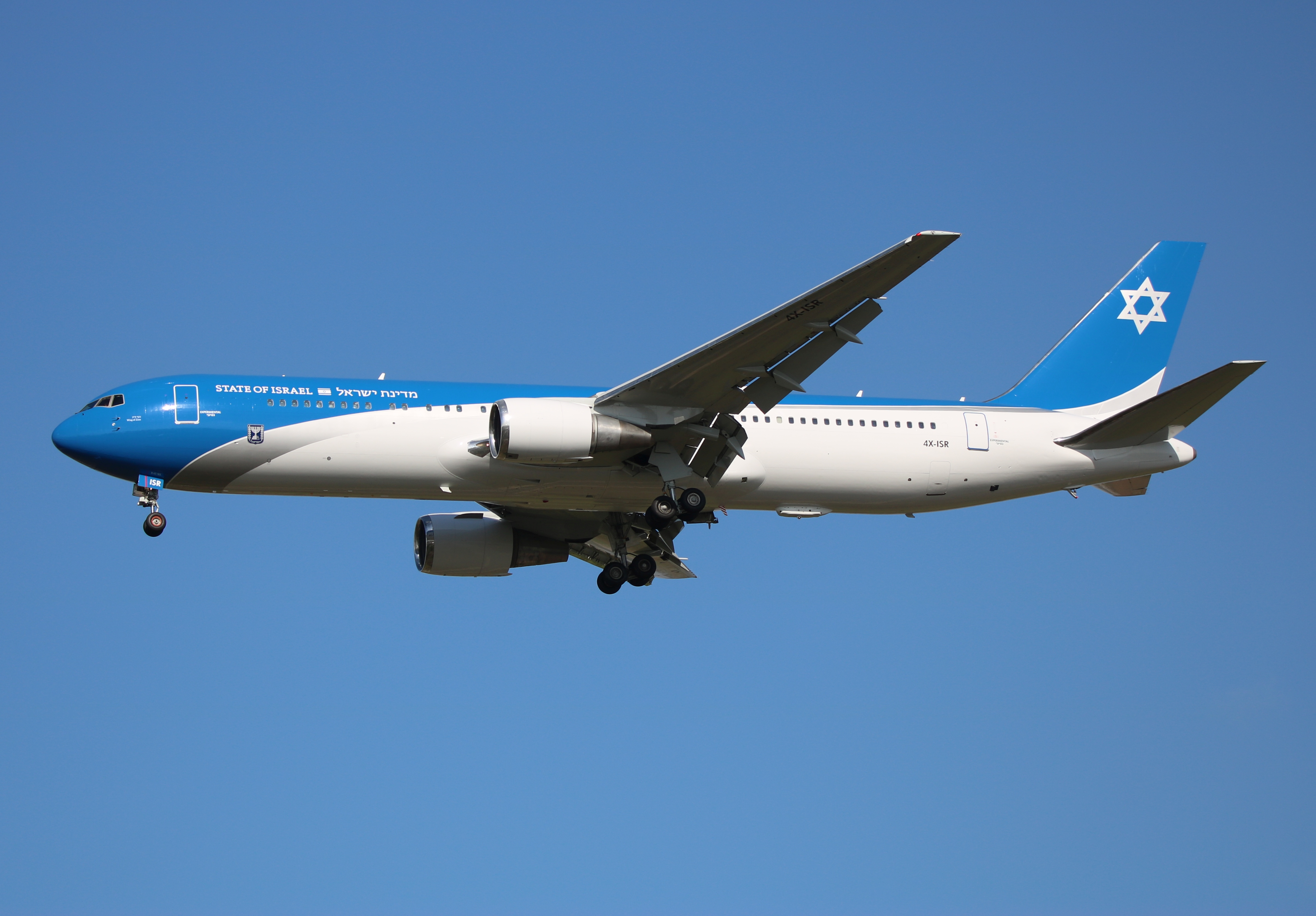
- 4X-ISR approaching Ben Gurion Airport

General information
- Type: Boeing 767-338ER
- National origin: Israel
- Owners: Israeli Air Force
- Construction number: MSN 30186
- Registration: 4X-ISR; (Formerly: N376CM; VH-OGV)
- Radio code: Israeli Air Force 1

History
- First flight: 3 November 2019; (Post conversion)

Wing of Zion (Hebrew: כנף ציון, romanized: Knaf Tzion; Arabic: جناح صهيون, romanized: Janah Sahyoun) is the principal government transport aircraft of the State of Israel, tasked with transporting the president and prime minister overseas during international visits. The aircraft is currently a Boeing 767-338ER widebody-twinjet airliner belonging to the Israeli Air Force.

== Predecessors ==
=== 1940s–1950s ===
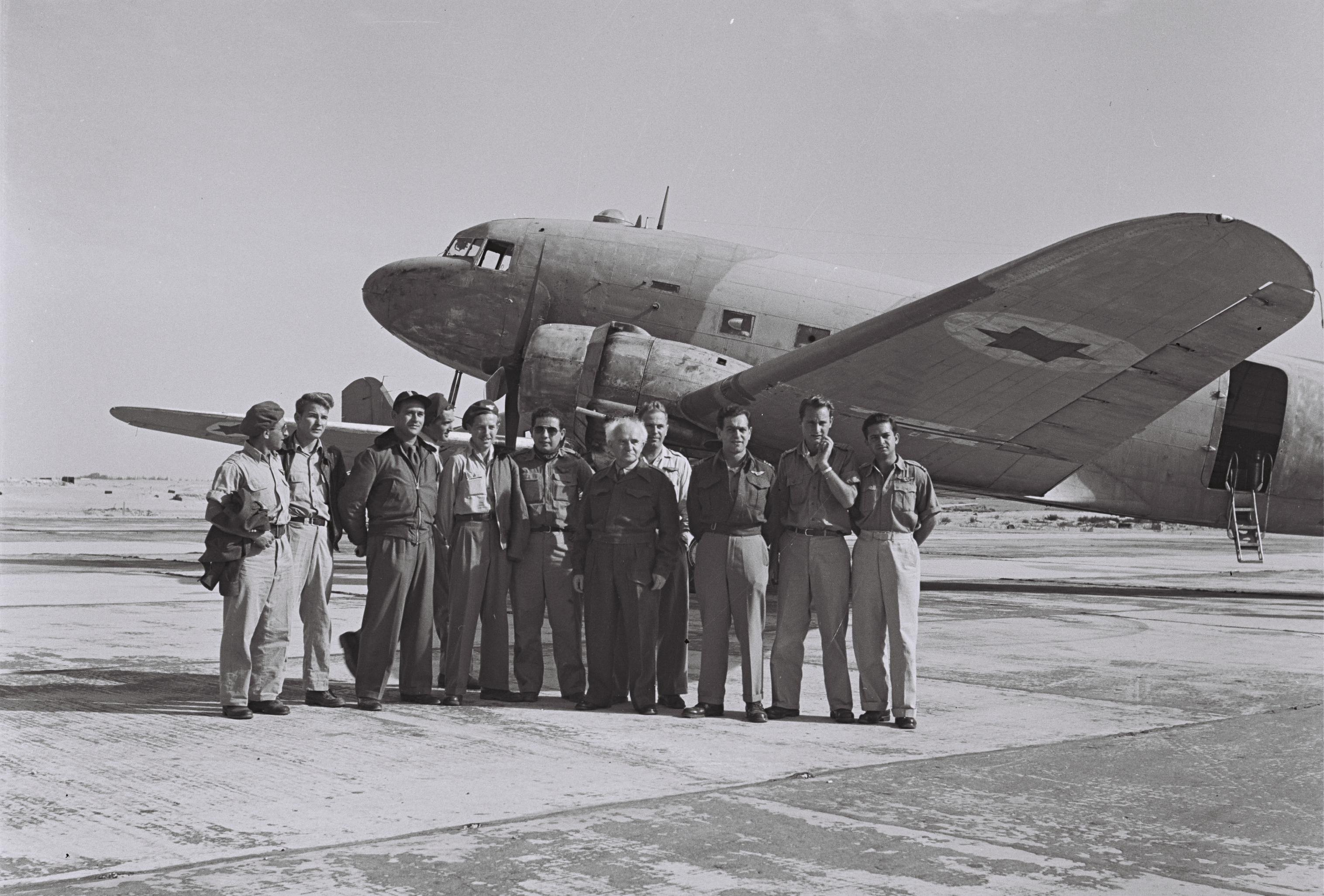
Prime Minister David Ben-Gurion standing next to his Douglas C-47 Skytrain

In the immediate months following the creation of Israel in 1948, inaugural prime minister David Ben-Gurion utilized military propeller-driven aircraft such as the Douglas DC-3 and C-47 belonging to the Israel Defense Forces (IDF) to travel domestically to visit several military fronts during the 1948 and 1956 Arab-Israeli conflicts.

=== 1950s–1960s ===
In the 1960s, the Israeli Air Force (IAF) opted to utilize its Boeing 377 Stratocruiser cargo transports, which were capable of long-range flights, to serve as a VIP aircraft for ministerial visits abroad. The planes, which were originally civilian airliners in the service of Pan Am, were purchased secondhand by the IAF in 1962 and reconfigured to cargo-transport configurations. One of the Stratocruisers in the IAF's inventory, FX-FPY Masada (formerly Pan Am's Princess of the Pacific), was used by the IAF in 1966 to transport then-prime minister Levi Eshkol on a 25,000 km (16,000 mi) trip to several African nations, including Kenya, Uganda, Madagascar, Congo, Liberia, Senegal and the Ivory Coast.

=== 1970s–2000s ===
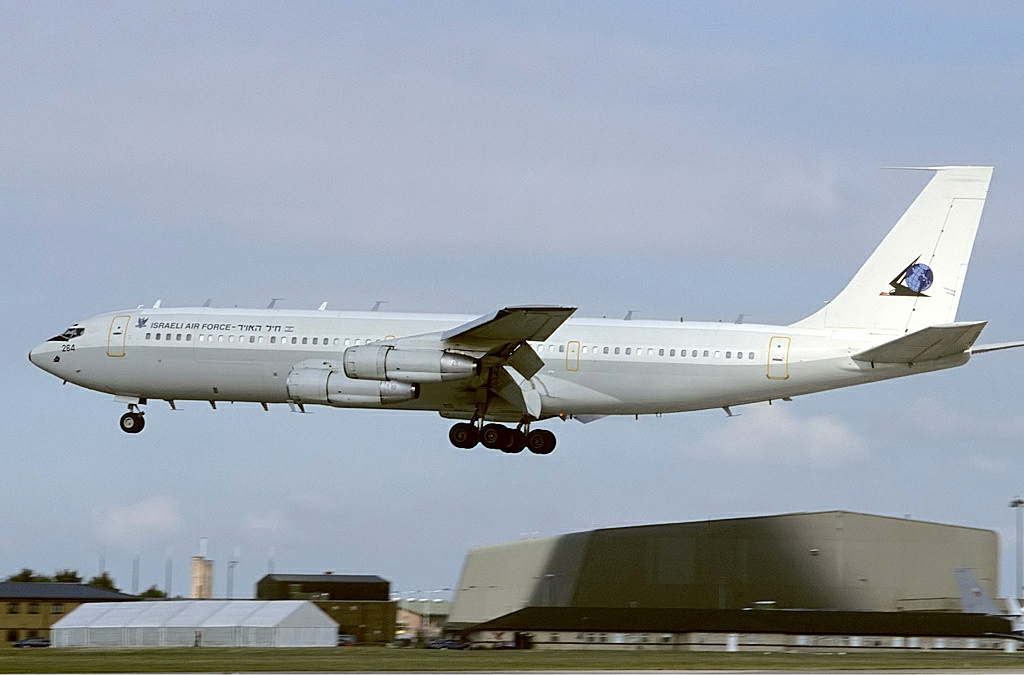
IAF Boeing 707 Re’em, used for VIP transport

From the 1970s onwards, the IAF opted to conduct VIP transport duties using its inventory of Boeing 707 jet-powered airliners. The lot of the 707s, nicknamed Re’em (Oryx), and also purchased secondhand from commercial airliners, were converted to military use by Israel Aerospace Industries (IAI). The 707s, which were originally designated by the IAF for air-to-air refueling (AAR) duties, were quickly converted to support transport duties whenever summoned. However, key disadvantages of the planes were their age and their inability to operate transatlantic routes without the need for refueling.

One of the 707s, the No. 118, flew prime minister Menachim Begin during his official visit to Egypt in 1979. Another aircraft, the No. 272, served prime ministers Benjamin Netanyahu, Ehud Barak and Ariel Sharon during their respective tenures in office. Simultaneously, another 707 jet that had originally been used by Egyptian president Anwar Sadat on his historic 1977 visit to Jerusalem and later sold by Egypt in 2005, was also purchased by the IAF in 2011 for AAR/VIP duties.

=== 2000s–present ===
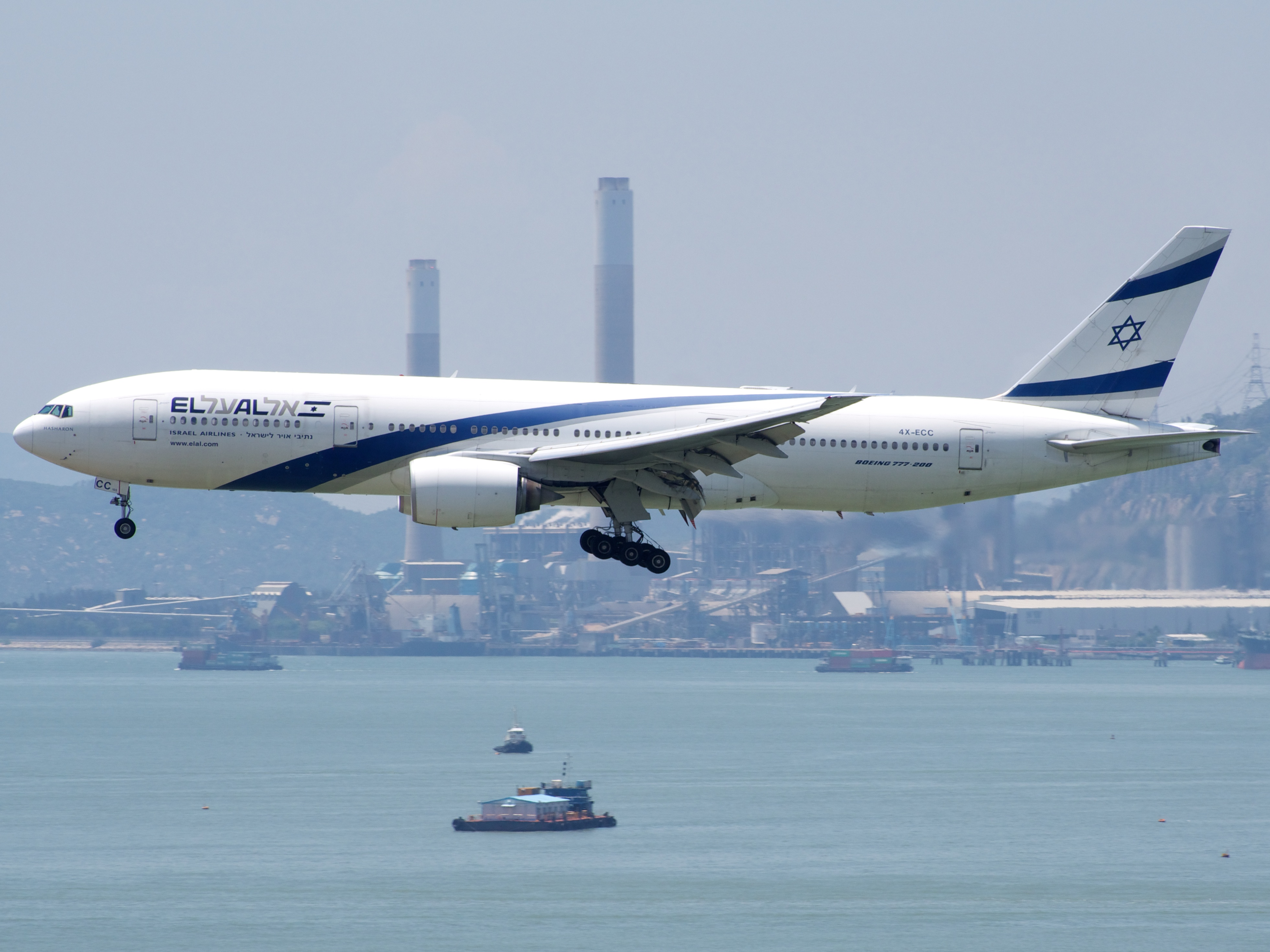
An El Al Boeing 777, similar to the ones that are chartered for official visits abroad

Since the beginning of the 2000s, senior officials of the Israeli government, including the president and the prime minister, have been transported abroad using commercial airliners leased by the Ministry of Defense from El Al, Israel's flag carrier. Although coming into force in the early 2000s, the practice of transporting Israeli officials overseas commercially was exercised in the 1970s; prime ministers Golda Meir and Menachim Begin both opted to travel commercially on long-range international routes. Nevertheless, for security reasons, senior executive officials were only allowed to travel using Israeli airlines.

Currently, for short-range international flights, El Al's inventory of Boeing 737 aircraft have been customarily used, while the larger wide-body aircraft such as the Boeing 767 and 777 have been used for long-range transcontinental travel. Until recently, in anticipation of an international trip, the defense ministry used to issue a competitive bidding tender to Israeli airlines, to transport the prime minister. However, since El Al has been the only airline to operate long-range wide-body aircraft, several prime ministers have customarily chosen it over other options.

However, the practice of commercial VIP transportation was criticized several times over multiple issues of concern, primarily of that of security: the aircraft designated to transport executive officials lacked encrypted communications. This issue was highlighted in 2014, when senior Israeli intelligence officials complained about the inability to relay sensitive information to the prime minister during flights on chartered aircraft, which lacked encrypted systems. Another problem that stemmed from security reasons was that of unforeseen setbacks: in 2019, prime minister Netanyahu was forced to postpone a return flight from Poland when the Boeing 777 he had boarded was accidentally damaged by a ground vehicle just ahead of takeoff. Another incident involving Netanyahu occurred in 2023, when the 777 which had been designated to transport him to Italy was delayed for several hours, on account of several El Al pilots refusing to operate the plane in protest against his policies.

While en route to the 2025 United Nations General Assembly, the Wing of Zion plane used by Netanyahu flew a non-standard route to reach John F. Kennedy International Airport in New York City. The flight stayed out of French and Spanish airspace, likely to avoid jurisdictions which are signatories to the International Criminal Court. France has stated that he may have immunity as Israel is not a signatory. Ynetnews wrote just prior to his December 2025 visit with President Trump in Florida that it was expected Netanyahu's plane would take the bypass route, as with his previous visit to the United States.

== Aircraft ==
The current Wing of Zion is a Boeing 767-338ER passenger aircraft, formerly belonging to Australian Airlines and Qantas and was 20 years old when purchased by Israel. The plane arrived in Israel in 2016 took three years to convert, at a cost of $207 million. The original budget for its purchase, conversion and upgrade was 393 million shekels ($115 million), which by the time it first flew had grown by 50 percent to 580 million shekels. Operating the plane was expected to cost 44.6 million shekels annually. The purchase of a dedicated plane was criticized, especially after it exceeded the original budget, and its inauguration was postponed several times. It includes a private office for the prime minister, a bedroom suite, a meeting room, and a war room. The aircraft conducted its first test flight on 3 November 2019

It was reported in 2020 that the office of Prime Minister Benjamin Netanyahu had ordered the plane grounded over concerns it would draw criticism during a major economic crisis with mounting unemployment due to restrictions enacted during the coronavirus pandemic. The aircraft received final approval on 7 December 2021 and completed its registration and inspection process by the Civil Aviation Authority of Israel. However, Naftali Bennett who was prime minister at that time decided not to use it. Nor did his successor, Yair Lapid. It was transferred to maintenance storage in a specially-constructed hangar at the Nevatim Airbase in 2022, pending a decision on its future use. The aircraft was considered for conversion into a military fuel tanker or sale for civilian use.

Following the 2022 election, which returned Netanyahu to the premiership, the plane was also returned to service. The first official flight was taken on 16 July 2024, carrying equipment and some members of the security delegation for an upcoming visit of Netanyahu to the United States. Due to space constraints, the plane would take two separate trips a week apart, with the second flight carrying the rest of the entourage of aides, guards, and journalists. Each transcontinental flight on the plane costs more than $200,000, as of 2024.

== See also ==
- Air Force One
