= Statues of Donald Trump =

A number of statues and sculptures have been produced depicting Donald Trump, the 45th and 47th President of the United States, including:

- The Emperor Has No Balls 18 August 2016, Joshua "Ginger" Monroe, for INDECLINE
- God Emperor Trump 9 February 2019, Fabrizio Galli
- Dump Trump 4 July 2019, Don Lessem
- Statue of Donald Trump (Slovenia) 29 August 2019, Tomaz Schlegl
- Trump Statue Initiative, statues, living statues, and projections; installed: July-October 2020
- Trump Buddha March 2021, Hong Jinshi
- Crooked and Obscene 28 September 2024, Joshua "Ginger" Monroe, for INDECLINE
- In Honor of a Lifetime of Sexual Assault

- 27 October 2024, Portland, Oregon, anonymous artist
- 30 October 2024, Philadelphia, Gerhard Marcks

- Don Colossus January 2025, Alan Cottrill
- Best Friends Forever 23 September 2025, The Secret Handshake (art group)
- King of the World 10 March 2026, The Secret Handshake (art group)
- The Orange Plague 7 October 2026, Jens Galschiøt
- The Foot Soldier 9 November 2026, The Secret Handshake (art group)

== Balloons of Donald Trump ==
- Trumpy the Rat 15 August 2017, Jeffrey Beebe
- Donald Trump baby balloon, 13 July 2018, Matt Bonner, for Leo Murray

== Statues about Donald Trump ==
- The Donald J. Trump Enduring Flame 28 October 2024
- A Throne Fit for a King 30 March 2026 depicting the White House's Lincoln bathroom, on the National Mall
- Operation Epic Furious: Strait to Hell, 11 May 2026, The Secret Handshake (art group)
- Iran War Participation Trophy, 13 July 2026, The Secret Handshake (art group)

== See also ==
- Statue of Melania Trump 5 July 2019, "Maxi" (Aleš Župevc), for Brad Downey
- Trump Chicken
- List of sculptures of presidents of the United States
