= Trump Statue Initiative =

Protest art project led by Brian Buckley

The Trump Statue Initiative is a protest art project headed by director Bryan Buckley with support from Bradley Tusk. Noting "Trump is obsessed with statues", Buckley and his team have created pop-up living statues criticizing President Donald Trump and actions taken during his presidency. The exhibitions are prepared in partnership with local artists within each city. They often appear with little to no notice, and vanish within hours. To date, there have been four installations across three cities, with several works included in each installation. The exhibits feature performers costumed and painted gold to mimic statues, placed on quick-built plinths with various inscriptions on them.

== Installations ==
=== July 2020: Washington D.C. ===
Violinist Celeste Vee covered music that has been used by the Trump campaign to the musicians' objections, such as R.E.M.:

- The Poser, living statue, memorializing the Donald Trump photo op at St. John's Church event. Erected July 17, 2020, western end of Freedom Plaza
- The Bunker, living statue, depicting Trump's evacuation to the White House bunker with Trump cowering and holding "Teddy Barr". Erected July 17, 2020, Trump International Hotel Washington, D.C.
- Now Go Back To School, living statue, showing making a demand to a student. Erected July 17, 2020, eastern end of Freedom Plaza

=== August 2020: Portland, Oregon ===
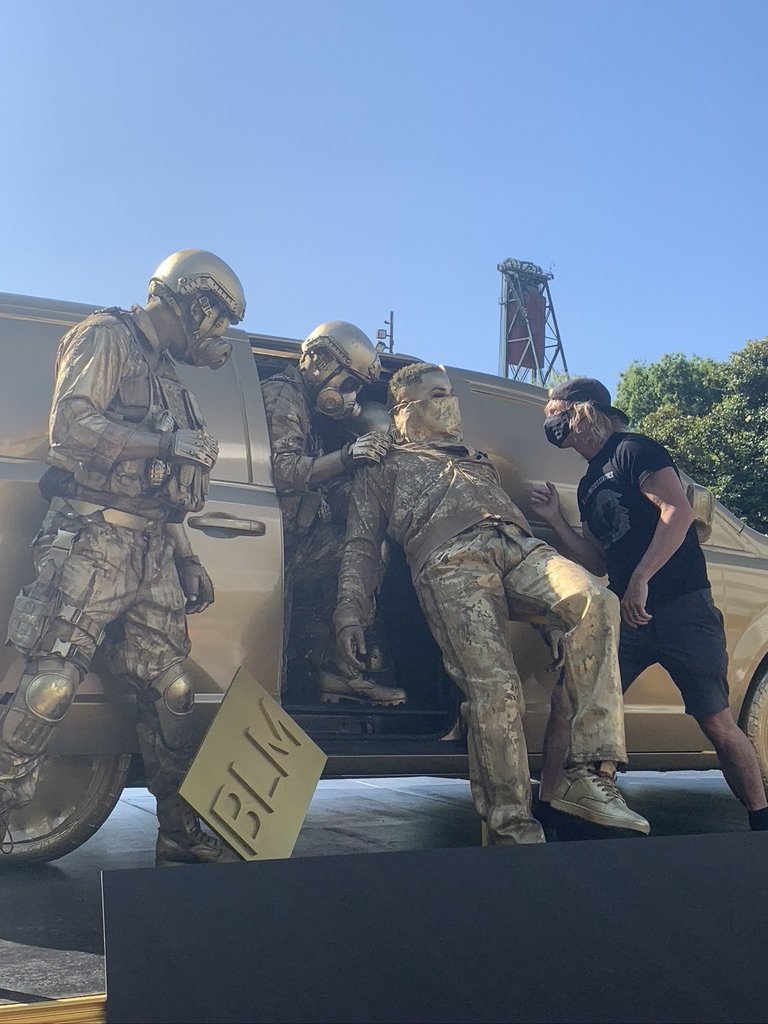
Buckley positions performers for the Ode To Putin statue in Waterfront Park, August 3rd 2020.

Three exhibits were placed in Portland, Oregon's Waterfront Park near Salmon Street Springs. The statues were joined by military veterans who read out Trump's statements of support for Russian Prime Minister Vladimir Putin.

- An Ode to Putin, living statue, showing a minivan abducting protesters in Portland, while Trump uses a selfie stick. Erected August 3, 2020.
- Some Federal Property We Can Attack, living statue, erected August 3, 2020.
- I Just Wish Her Well Frankly, depicting Trump kneeling in prayer to Ghislaine Maxwell with a picture of Trump with Maxwell. Living statue, erected August 3, 2020.

=== September 2020: Washington, D.C. ===
- "I Will Fight Racism Nov 3", September 7, 2020, Kalorama
- "He's The Fraud", faux shadow of a blue mailbox, September 7, 2020, Penn Quarter
- "Fight Fascism Nov 3", faux shadow of a blue mailbox in front of the US Department of Agriculture, September 7, 2020

=== September 2020: New York City ===
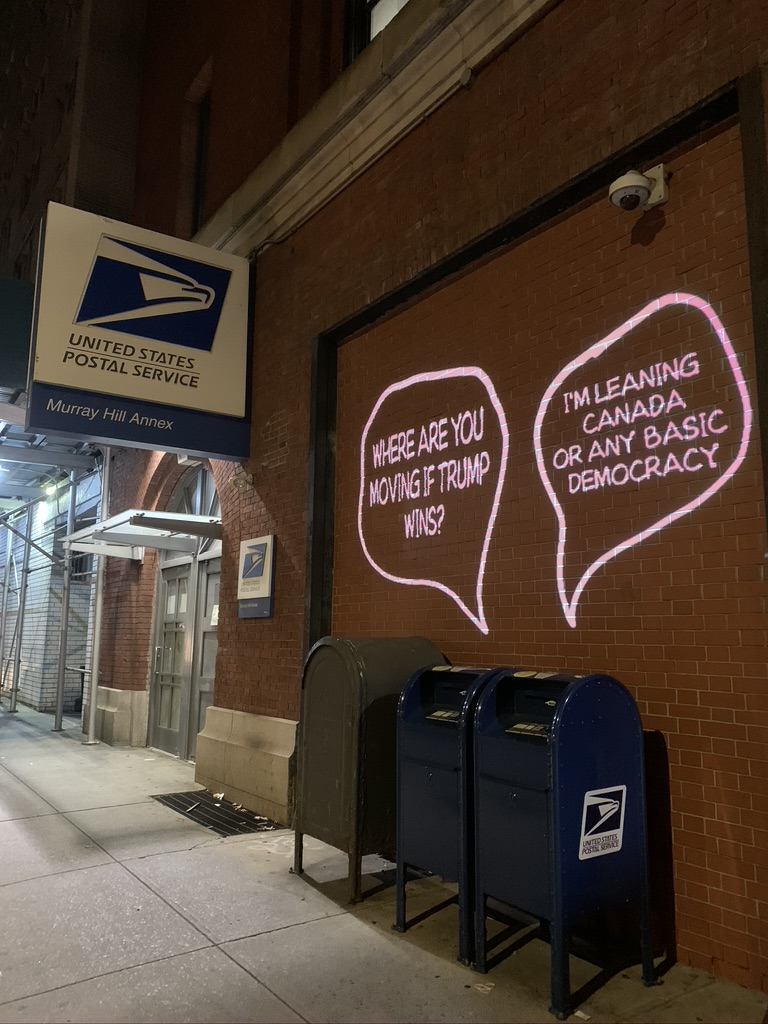
An example of one of the mailbox projections exhibited in New York City, September 4th 2020

==== Projections ====
A collaboration with Illuminator Art Collective, several projections appeared around New York City accompanying mail boxes. The projections took the form of quote bubbles, making the mail boxes appear to be speaking - the messages were in support of the US Postal Service, and were mostly derisive jokes aimed at President Trump.

==== Statues ====
- The Final Push, depicting Trump driving a golf cart while filmed by Fox News, crashing into tombstones depicting COVID deaths and denigrating troops. Erected September 8, 2020, Battery Park.
- The Giant vs The Stealer, living statue.
- Good Boy, Now Sit, living statue depicting Trump holding a BLM sign with bullet holes and Kyle Rittenhouse holding a gun with spent rounds at his feet.

=== October 2020: Washington, D.C. ===
==== Projections ====
Collaborating again with lluminator Art Collective, messages were projected on the front of the Trump International Hotel, the front of the Environmental Protection Agency building, and the lawn of the Washington Monument.

- Trump International Hotel, messages included "have you seen our luxurious hotel for children," "guess where maids pay more taxes than the hotel owner?" and "stay one night and get one dirty political favor for free (offer expires 11/4/20)
- Environmental Protection Agency building depicted industrial smokestacks billowing smoke into the clouds over each column of the building facade, with "Trump's 2020" written above. Another graphic displayed deceased Supreme Court Justice Ruth Bader Ginsburg's eye with a tear running down one of the building's columns.
- Washington Monument lawn included the message "figures we get this first. And the world's biggest asshole came second" and also separately featured the graphic of Ruth Bader Ginsburg again.

==== Statues ====
- Fill That Seat, depicting Trump urinating into the empty seat of deceased Supreme Court Justice Ruth Bader Ginsburg. Erected October 27, 2020, Lincoln Memorial.
- Don't Be Afraid, living statue depicting Trump standing between two graves, mourned by a medical worker and fire fighter in reference to the COVID-19 outbreak and West Coast Forest Fires. The title is based on Trump's proclamation on Twitter that COVID-19 is nothing to fear after he recovered from the virus. Erected October 27, 2020, Lincoln Memorial.
- The Poser, a reprisal of the living statue erected in Freedom Plaza on July 17, memorializing the Donald Trump photo op at St. John's Church event. Erected October 27, 2020, Lincoln Memorial.
- Safety For The Suburban Housewife, living statue depicting Trump peeking up the skirt of a housewife as he supports her ladder. Erected October 27, 2020, Outside Trump International Hotel.

== See also ==
- Best Friends Forever (sculpture)
- Dump Trump (statue)
- In Honor of a Lifetime of Sexual Assault
- King of the World (sculpture)
- The Emperor Has No Balls
- Trump Buddha
- The Donald J. Trump Enduring Flame
