= Statue of Donald Trump (Slovenia) =

Destroyed statue in Slovenia

- Artist: Tomaz Schlegl
- Year: 2019
- Medium: Wooden sculpture
- Subject: Donald Trump
- Location: Sela pri Kamniku, Slovenia; 46.2375°N 14.6849°E

A statue of the 45th (and later 47th) U.S. President Donald Trump was erected on private land in Sela pri Kamniku, Slovenia, in 2019. The approximately 25-foot (7.6 m) wood monument depicted Trump wearing a blue suit and a red tie, with a fierce expression and his right arm raised in a fist. A mechanism inside the statue allowed the mouth to open, revealing sharp teeth. Tomaž Schlegl, the artist behind the project, said that "Like all populists, the statue has two faces."

The artist intended the statue as "a provocation, because the world is full of populism". Former Slovenian member of parliament Igor Omerza thought it could be seen as a sign of the country's "love-hate" relationship with President Trump, depicting either the raised hand of the Statue of Liberty or the iron fist of a populist dictator.

After complaints from residents, the statue was relocated to Moravče. It was vandalised with the addition of a Hitler moustache, and later burned to the ground by unknown arsonists.

== See also ==
- 2019 in art
- Dump Trump (statue)
- Statue of Melania Trump
- God Emperor Trump
