= God Emperor Trump =

2019 Italian sculpture and float

The Master Drone
- Il Pa-Drone (Italian)
- Artist: Fabrizio Galli
- Year: 2019
- Medium: Papier-mâché
- Subject: Donald Trump
- Location: Viareggio, Italy

The Master Drone or Il Pa-Drone, popularly referred to as God Emperor Trump, was a 65-foot (20-metre) papier-mâché sculpture and float depicting Donald Trump, the president of the United States, dressed as the fictional God Emperor of Mankind from the Warhammer 40,000 miniature war game franchise. It was created by the Italian artist Fabrizio Galli for the Carnival of Viareggio in 2019.

== Design ==
The sculpture depicted Donald Trump wearing golden armour based on that of the God Emperor of Mankind from Warhammer 40,000. The knee and shoulder pads of the armour depicted the heads of various political figures. In his right hand, Trump held a sword with four blue birds, representing Twitter, the platform from which he criticised his perceived enemies and promoted his positions. Engraved on the blade of the sword was the Italian phrase dazi vostri, which translates to 'your taxes' or 'your duties', but is also a pun on cazzi vostri, meaning 'you're in trouble'. According to Fabrizio, the phrase could mean 'here's your fucking tariffs'. The sculpture included multiple moving parts.

== Symbolism ==
The artist of the sculpture, Fabrizio Galli, stated that the sculpture was intended to mock the Trump presidency, and that Trump shares parallels with the fictional emperor from Warhammer 40,000. Pointing out Trump's goals of Mars colonisation and the creation of the United States Space Force, Galli stated that politics had abandoned intellectualism in favour of "fantasy" and "virtual life". The sword was intended as symbolic of Trump "trying to destroy nations with the economy instead of nuclear missiles". This has been interpreted as a reference to the Warhammer 40,000 concept of Exterminatus, or the destruction of an entire planet.

Images of Donald Trump photoshopped into the armour of the God Emperor of Mankind, as well as the title of "God Emperor Trump", had been Internet memes used by Trump supporters prior to the float's debut.

== Reception ==
Although the sculpture was intended to criticise Trump, many of his supporters embraced it, with Emerald Robinson, the White House correspondent for One America News Network, stating that the Italian carnival looked "more fun" than the American Thanksgiving Day Parade because of the float. Several conservative commentators interpreted the float to be a tribute to Trump, claiming that the carnival was a parade in his honour.

The Huffington Post described the sculpture as "terrifying".

== See also ==
- Best Friends Forever (sculpture)
- Donald Trump baby balloon
- Dump Trump (statue)
- Trump Statue Initiative
- In Honor of a Lifetime of Sexual Assault
- King of the World (sculpture)
- The Emperor Has No Balls
- Trump Buddha
- Trump Chicken
- Trumpy the Rat
- The Donald J. Trump Enduring Flame
