= Trump Chicken =

Inflatable caricature mocking the U.S. president

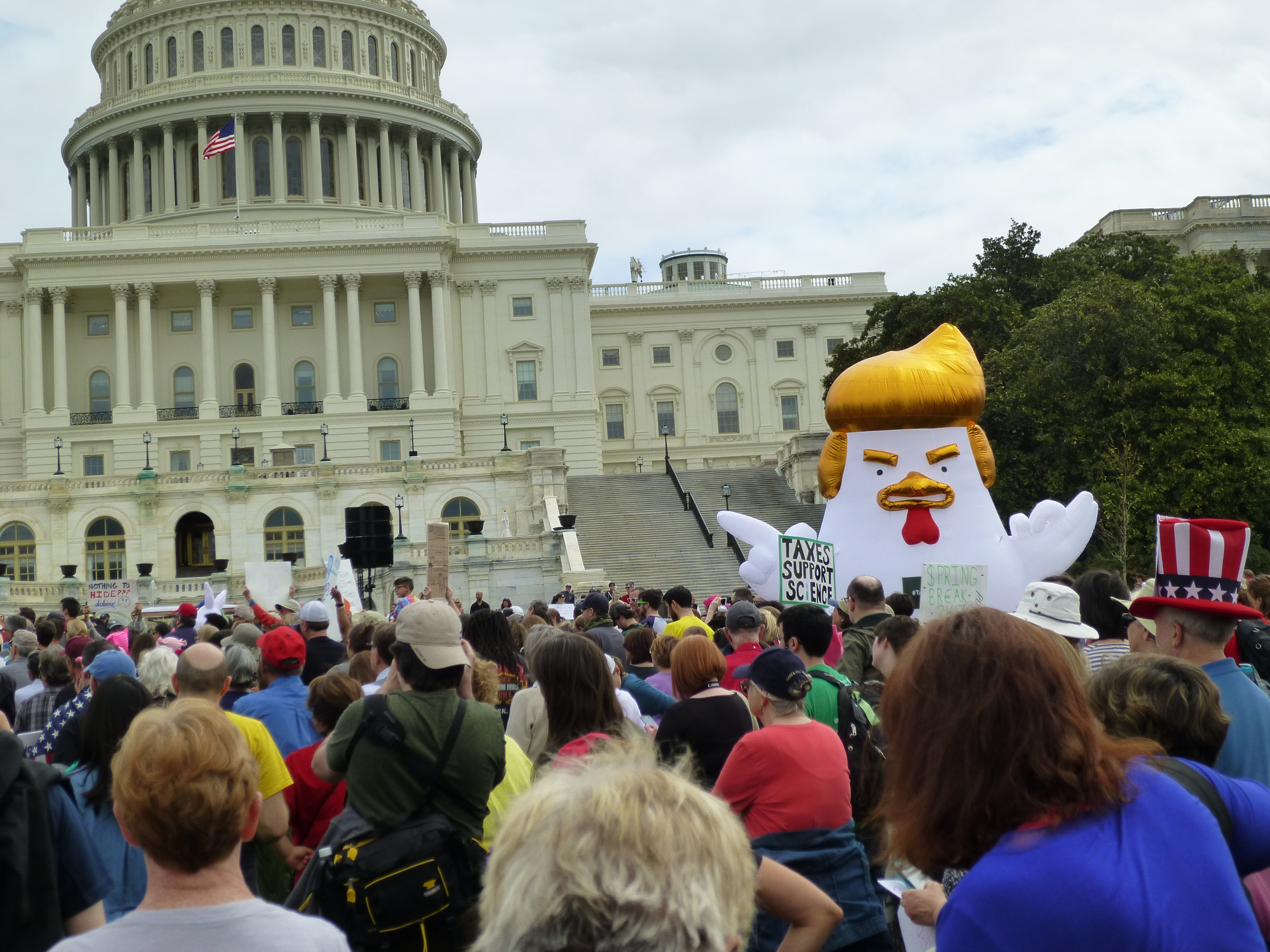
- The balloon outside the United States Capitol in Washington, D.C. during the 2017 Tax March
- Artist: Casey Latiolais
- Completion date: December 2016
- Medium: Plastic inflatable
- Subject: Donald Trump
- Dimensions: 7.0 m (23 ft)
- Website: thetrumpchicken.org

Trump Chicken was a Chinese New Year mascot for the Year of the Rooster. It unexpectedly became popular because it looked similar to Donald Trump, the 45th and 47th President of the United States. In the United States, Trump Chicken was often used as a cartoon image reflecting Trump. It is used by both Trump's opponents and supporters. It was designed by Seattle-based illustrator Casey Latiolais.

== Appearance ==
Trump Chicken is a fat, white chicken with a human-like face. It had golden feet, eyebrows, and a beak. There was no cockscomb on the top of its head, instead having golden hair, with the left side of the hair subtly raised. The underside of the beak is a red, tie-shaped fleshy crest. The two wings looked closer to the human hands and are raised high to the sides. The difference is that the thumb and index finger of the "left hand" are clasped into a circle, making it an OK gesture; while the right hand extends the index finger and points to the sky.

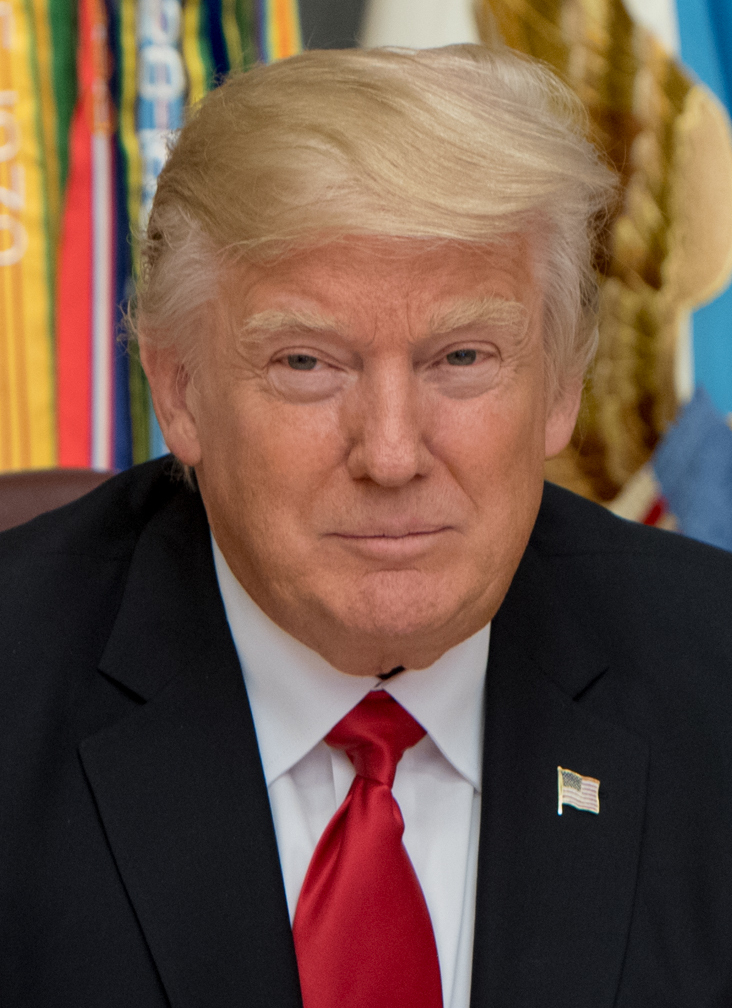
Donald Trump in 2017

== Background ==
The origin of the mascot, named the "Trump Rooster" statue by the media, was a 23-foot-tall New Year mascot displayed outside the North America Xintiandi Shopping Center in Taiyuan, China, in late December 2016. The over of the mall said that the original design idea was to have the mascot make the "number one" (generally being understood as pointing to the sky) and "OK" gestures to represent business success and good luck. The facial features referred to the images in Angry Birds. When the mascot was put on display, it was quickly discovered that he resembled Donald Trump. After it became popular on Weibo, many people even went to the exhibition site to take photos. The shopping mall noticed this trend and took the opportunity to launch products related to this mascot, such as inflatable toys, dolls and other types of souvenirs. In March 2017, the mascot was spread to the United States. After some anti-Trump activists noticed it on the Internet, they thought the mascot looked very similar to Trump, so they purchased a large number of related dolls and inflatable toys from China and used them in the anti-Trump protests in San Francisco in April. The mascot, known as the "Trump Chicken", became popular in the United States. Various Trump Chicken memorabilia was sold on Amazon and eBay.

The designer of Trump Chicken, Casey Latiolais, was surprised by the popularity of the mascot. He said he merely accepted a design order from a Chinese real estate developer and completed it, and did not consider using the design to satirize Trump, and that any similarities with Trump were coincidences. He also said that he consulted his family about the design and received approval — including his parents, who voted for Trump in the 2016 election.

== Usage in the public ==
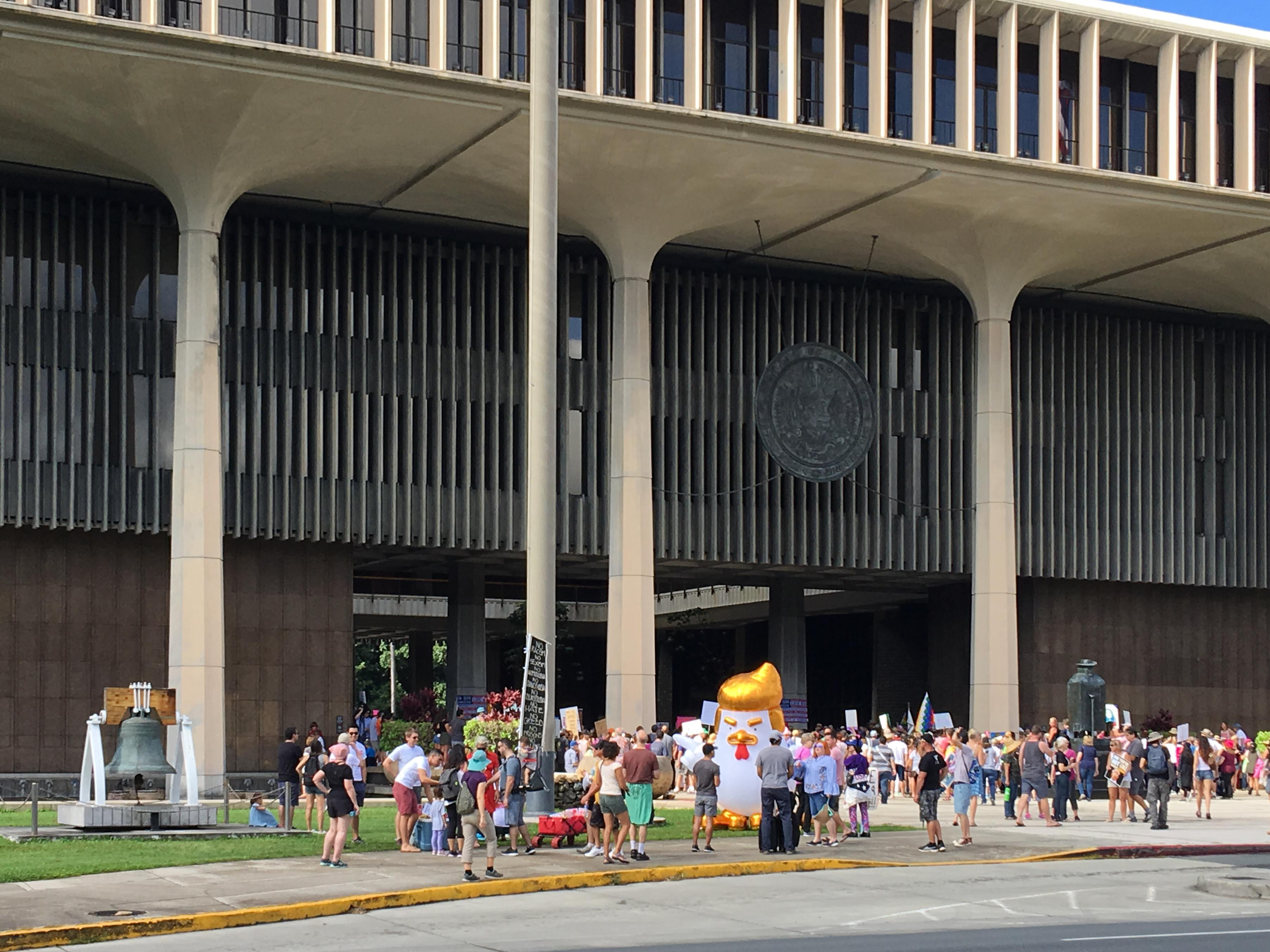
The balloon during the 2018 Women's March in Honolulu

- In April 2017, protesters participating in the Tax March used a large number of inflatable Trump chickens as part of their protest.
- On August 9, 2017, Taran Singh Brar, a Republican-leaning Californian documentary filmmaker, erected a 30-foot-tall inflatable Trump chicken on The Ellipse, south of the White House. Brar said that he placed the Trump chicken in the White House to protest Trump's "refusal to report his tax returns" and "weakness on North Korea and Putin." It took Brar five months to get approval from the National Park Service to place the Trump chicken. Brar’s chicken returned in 2025 in various European cities under the moniker "Felon Don." Brar alleges that his 2017 Trump chicken display resulted in him being tortured.
- In early September 2017, a 10-foot inflatable Trump chicken was placed by protestors outside Congressman Dana Rohrabacher's office in Huntington Beach, California because he refused to hold meetings with voters. Later that month, another inflatable Trump chicken was placed outside Senator Thom Tillis's office in Charlotte, North Carolina, urged him to establish a new law to protect the DACA Dreamers.
- In July 2018, anti-Trump protesters placed a 33-foot-tall inflatable Trump chicken dressed in black-and-white prison strips with a label "Prisoner 45" (Trump was the 45th President of the United States) on a boat bound for Devil's Island in San Francisco. Protesters demand Trump release his tax returns or he'll be prisoned.

== Similar designs ==
- In March 2017, a New York City-based artist Jeffrey Beebe and BravinLee designed a rat inflatable object called Trumpy the Rat.
- In December 2017, the North America Xintiandi Shopping Center in Taiyuan, China displayed a newly designed Trump dog as the mascot for the Year of the Dog.

== See also ==
- 2017 in art
- Donald Trump baby balloon
- God Emperor Trump
- Trumpy the Rat
- Statues of Donald Trump
