= Tax March =

2017 protests in the United States

Tax March (Trump's Tax Day)
- Part of protests against Donald Trump
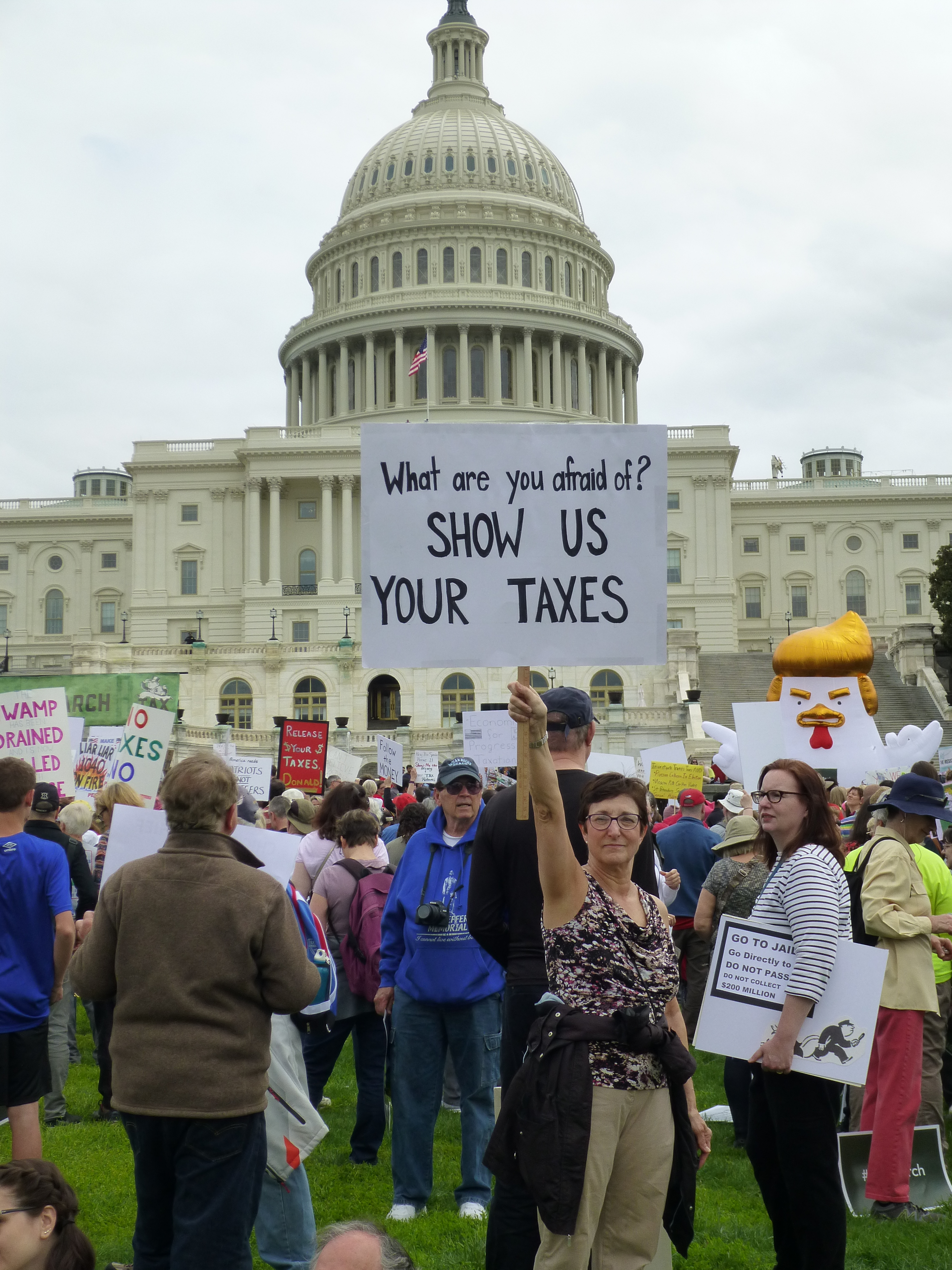
- Demonstrators outside the United States Capitol
- Date: April 15, 2017; 9 years ago
- Location: Various cities across the United States and abroad
- Caused by: Donald Trump's refusal to release his tax returns as promised
- Methods: Protest march

Number
- 120,000

The Tax March (also known as the Tax Day March and Trump's Tax Day) was a series of demonstrations held in more than 150 locations throughout the United States on April 15, 2017. The intent was to pressure U.S. President Donald Trump to release his tax returns.

At least 180 march events were organized in the United States and abroad. The protests were a response to the perceived lack of transparency in the Trump administration, and the fact that President Trump still had not released his tax returns by that date, contrary to his promise that he would. April 15 is the deadline for most households to file income tax returns in the United States, though in 2017 the deadline was April 18 as the 15th fell on a Saturday.

== Background ==
The march organizers demanded that President Trump release his IRS tax returns, as he promised he would during his campaign. Tax Day protests have been held since the 1990s and earlier, although until then typically by libertarian groups. The Tea Party movement got started in part with a Tax Day protest on April 15, 2009.

After 300,000 American citizens signed an online petition on WhiteHouse.gov in January 2017, Trump spokesperson Kellyanne Conway announced Trump would not release his tax returns due to lack of interest. In response, a Tax Day March was planned for April 15, 2017, to be held in over two dozen major cities in the U.S., to pressure Trump to release his tax returns.

The idea for the march was originally proposed on Twitter on January 22, 2017 by law professor Jennifer Taub, followed soon after by comedian Frank Lesser. Some Tax Day march events were planned independently, without awareness of the tweets by Taub or Lesser.

Unlike most liberal protests in the United States, the Tax March did not focus on broad issues, but instead focused on a specific demand.

== Organizers and participating groups ==
Taub, who proposed the march idea on Twitter, later joined the executive committee for the march. Lesser has also helped plan and publicize the event.

Groups convening for the march included the American Federation of Teachers, Color of Change, Democracy Spring, Media Matters for America, MoveOn.org, the National Education Association, the National Women's Law Center, and Public Citizen.

In early April 2017, march organizers wrote letters to Republican Congress members who had called on Trump to release his tax returns, asking them to attend the march and to "hold the President accountable".

== Planning ==
Marches were planned, and took place in over 150 cities throughout the United States. Marches in at least eighteen U.S. cities featured giant inflatable "Trump chickens", originally designed by a graphic artist in Seattle and manufactured in Zhejiang, China for the Chinese Lunar New Year (for the Year of the Rooster). The San Francisco Tax March organizer who ordered the first inflatables felt that they symbolized that "Donald Trump was a big chicken for not releasing his taxes." Organizers using the Tax Day's Facebook page chose to focus events on "government transparency, conflicts of interest and an unfair tax system," according to CNBC.

== Locations ==
=== National ===
Time reported that the demographics of the protesters for the Tax March were somewhat older than other protests against Trump, such as the Women's March. There were large numbers of senior citizens at marches and families with children. Many people wore pink hats from the Women's March while others brought plastic chickens or wore Russian-themed hats. Across the country, there were more than 120,000 people participating in a local march or protest.

==== Washington, D.C. ====
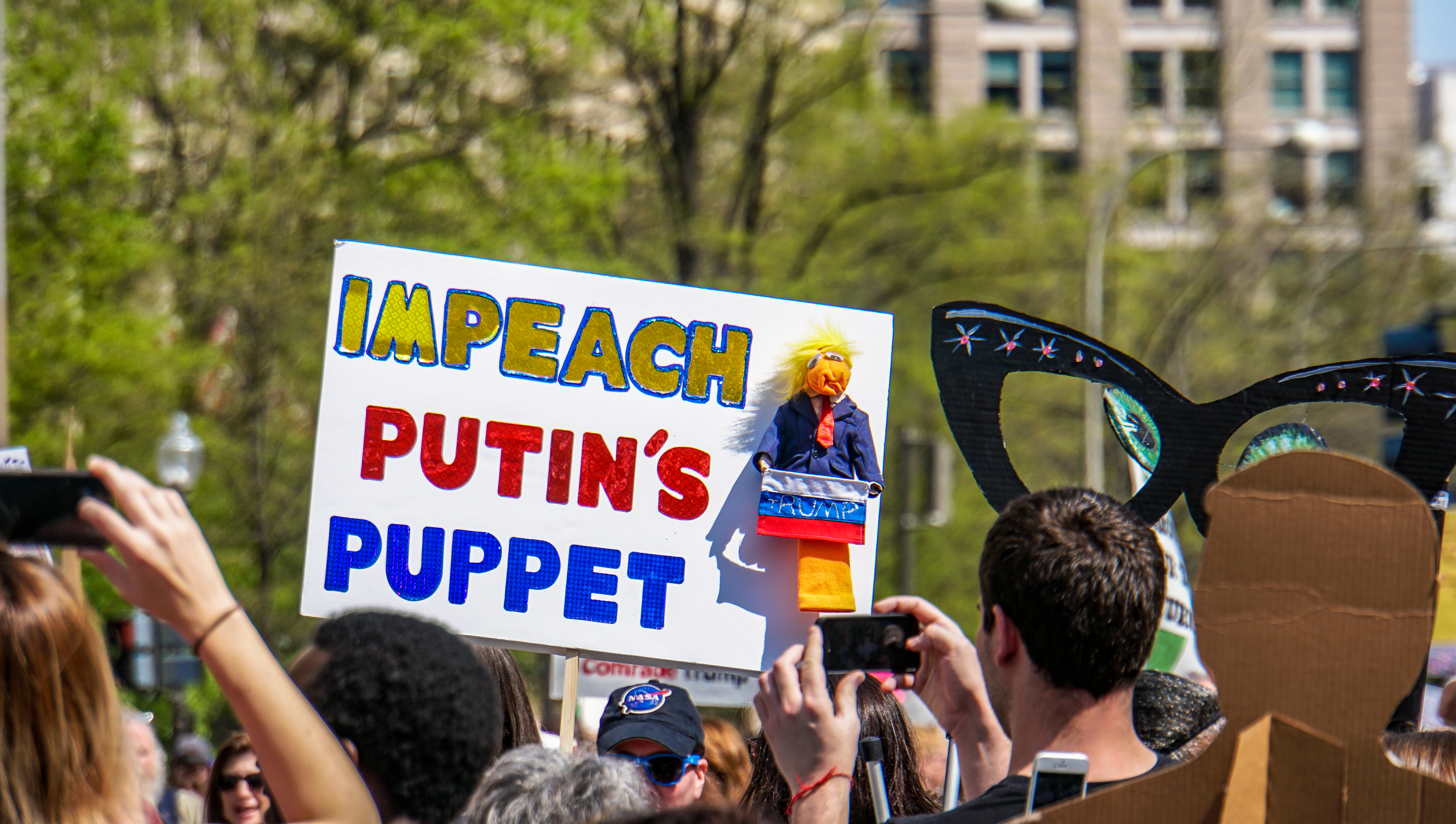
Tax March in Washington, D.C., in 2017

The march in Washington, D.C. began with a rally at the U.S. Capitol, with speeches from Democratic lawmakers including Senator Ron Wyden and Representatives Maxine Waters and Jamie Raskin. Organizers expected up to 10,000 people to attend the D.C. march. Thousands of demonstrators attended the march.

==== Arizona ====
In Phoenix, there were around 800 protesters outside of the State Capitol building. Legislators, Ken Clark and Juan Mendez were in attendance at the protest. It was organized by local activist Jenna McAllister. Around 1,000 protesters marched in downtown Tucson. A Tax March took place in Yuma, where Congressman Raul Grijalva and Arizona Democratic Whip Charlene Fernandez were in attendance.

==== California ====
In Laguna Beach, around 500 protesters came to the Main Beach, taking up space in a line over two city-blocks long.

In Los Angeles, the march began at 11 a.m. at Pershing Square, Fifth, and Oliver streets. It ended at Los Angeles City Hall, with speakers being lawmakers from the local and state levels. An estimated 10,000 to 12,000 people were reported to have attended the demonstration in Los Angeles. Justine Bateman was also one of the speakers at the event.

Around 400 protesters marched in downtown Modesto. Protests in Palo Alto took place in both of the city's plazas and also at the Apple Store located on University Avenue.

Thousands attended a rally and march from San Francisco City Hall, which featured speakers including House Minority Leader Nancy Pelosi and David Cay Johnston, the journalist who received and revealed a portion of Trump's tax return on The Rachel Maddow Show in March 2017. San Francisco Board of Supervisors member Jane Kim stated at the rally, "I'm not afraid to call Trump an enemy of this state."

There were hundreds of marchers in Sacramento, some wearing costumes. Around 3,000 people showed up for a march in San Diego. In San Jose, protesters marched from City Hall to Plaza de Cesar Chavez where they then held a rally. The march took place in the downtown area. Over 1,000 marchers filled the downtown streets in Santa Cruz. The march was organized by Santa Cruz Indivisible. Around 100 protesters came to the march in Visalia, which was planned by the Tulare County Democratic Party, South Valley Civics and Indivisible. A protest also occurred in Walnut Creek.

==== Colorado ====
The March in Denver, Colorado started at 10 am at the Civic Center Park, went through the downtown area and then returned to the park. Speakers included Representative Jared Polis, Nathan Woodliff-Stanley of the ACLU, and state representatives Joseph Salazar, Chris Hansen and Edie Hooton. In Grand Junction, around 260 demonstrators rallied at the City Hall.

==== Florida ====
In Naples, there were several hundred protesters who marched near Cambier Park. Participants also mailed postcards to the White House. Sarasota saw 2,000 protesters attend the Tax Day March held at Bayfront Park. Around 1,000 activists gathered at Trump Tower in West Palm Beach, Florida and marched to Bingham Island, which was close to the Mar-a-Lago resort, where Trump planned to stay the weekend. Protesters were reported to have yelled slogans such as "no more secrets" near the resort.

==== Illinois ====
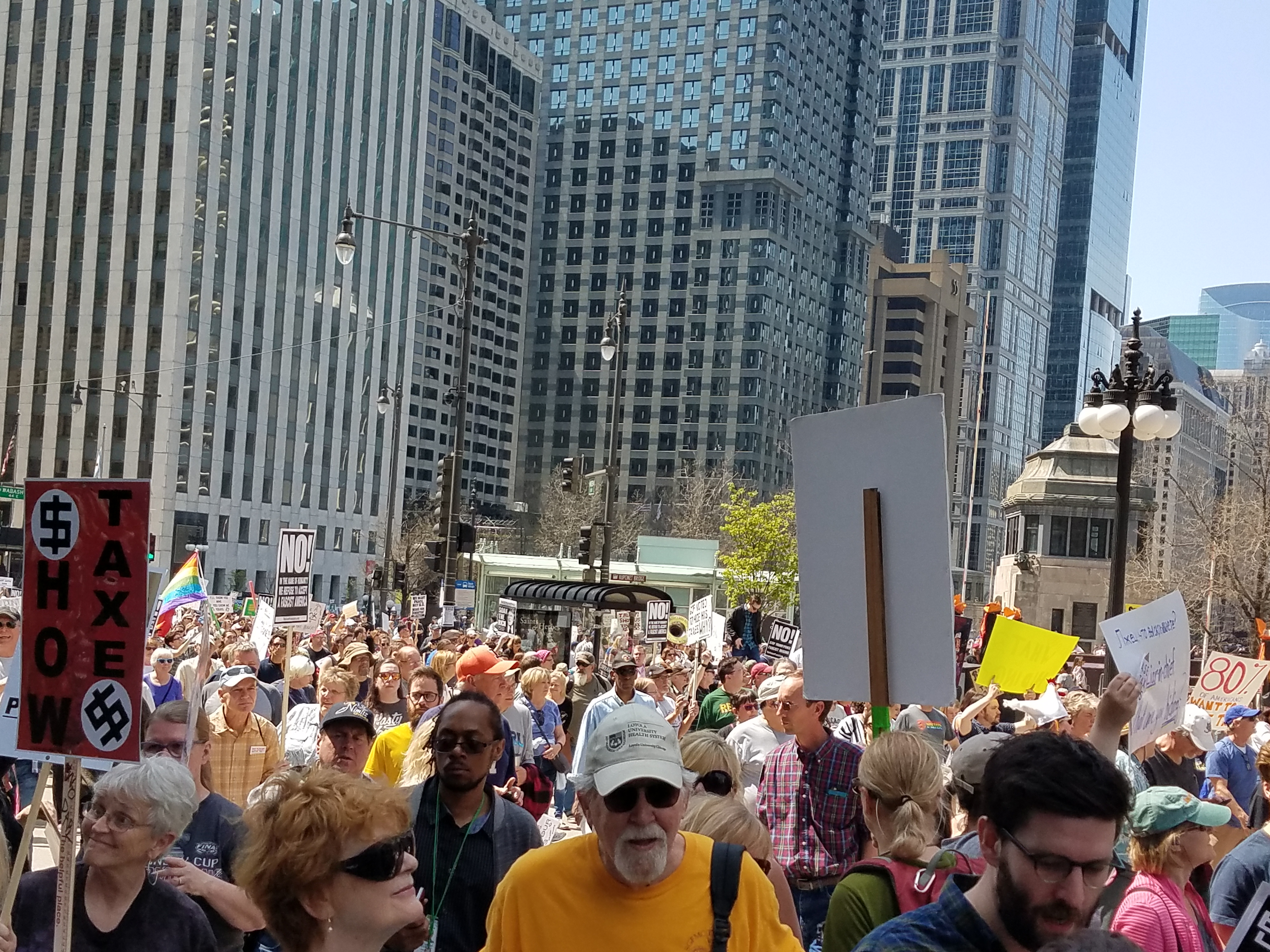
Demonstrators in Chicago

The march in Chicago, Illinois has scheduled speakers including Reverend Jesse Jackson and U.S. representatives Mike Quigley and Jan Schakowsky. The March drew an estimated 2000 - 4000 people.

==== Indiana ====
Forty protesters came out to rally in front of Thomas Centennial Park in Chesterson. Organizers included Chesteron Resistance Meetup and Indivisible NWI-Chesteron. Around 250 protesters marched in Goshen, rallying on the Village Green. Protesters also came out in Indianapolis. A small group, organized by Kokomo Resist, rallied in downtown Kokomo.

==== Maine ====
A march took place in Bangor. In Portland, there were 300 people involved with one of the marches which was organized by March Forth and took place in front of City Hall. Another march in Portland started at 2pm at Deering Oaks and focused on immigration. In Thomaston, a protest organized by Midcoast Maine Indivisible marched down Main Street.

==== Massachusetts ====
In Cambridge, a rally of around 2,000 people gathered on Cambridge Common for a peaceful demonstration. Representative Mike Connolly, activists Cassandra Bensahih, Emily Kirkland and Spencer O'Dowd were speakers. The rally focused on Trump's taxes, and tax reform.

==== Michigan ====
There were 1,300 demonstrators in Ann Arbor. Representative Debbie Dingell, state representatives, Yousef Rabhi and Kristy Pagan, Susan Baskett, Michelle Deatrick, Robert Joseph and Eli Savit were speakers at the Ann Arbor rally. The march was co-organized by Michigan to Believe In and Progressives at the University of Michigan. The march went through downtown and culminated with a rally on the Diag at the University of Michigan. Hamtramck Tax march was hosted by the Metro-Detroit Political Action Network (MDPAN) with Speakers Dr. Ahmed Ghanim and Jenny Byer. The rally was held in Pope Park and they had "Donnie Nuggets" the 15 ft trump chicken mascot for the tax marches. The event was organized by Co-Founder of MDPAN Adriene Avripas.

Similar Michigan tax marches were held in Ann Arbor, Farmington, Hamtramck, Grand Rapids, Pentwater and Marquette according to The Detroit News.

==== Minnesota ====
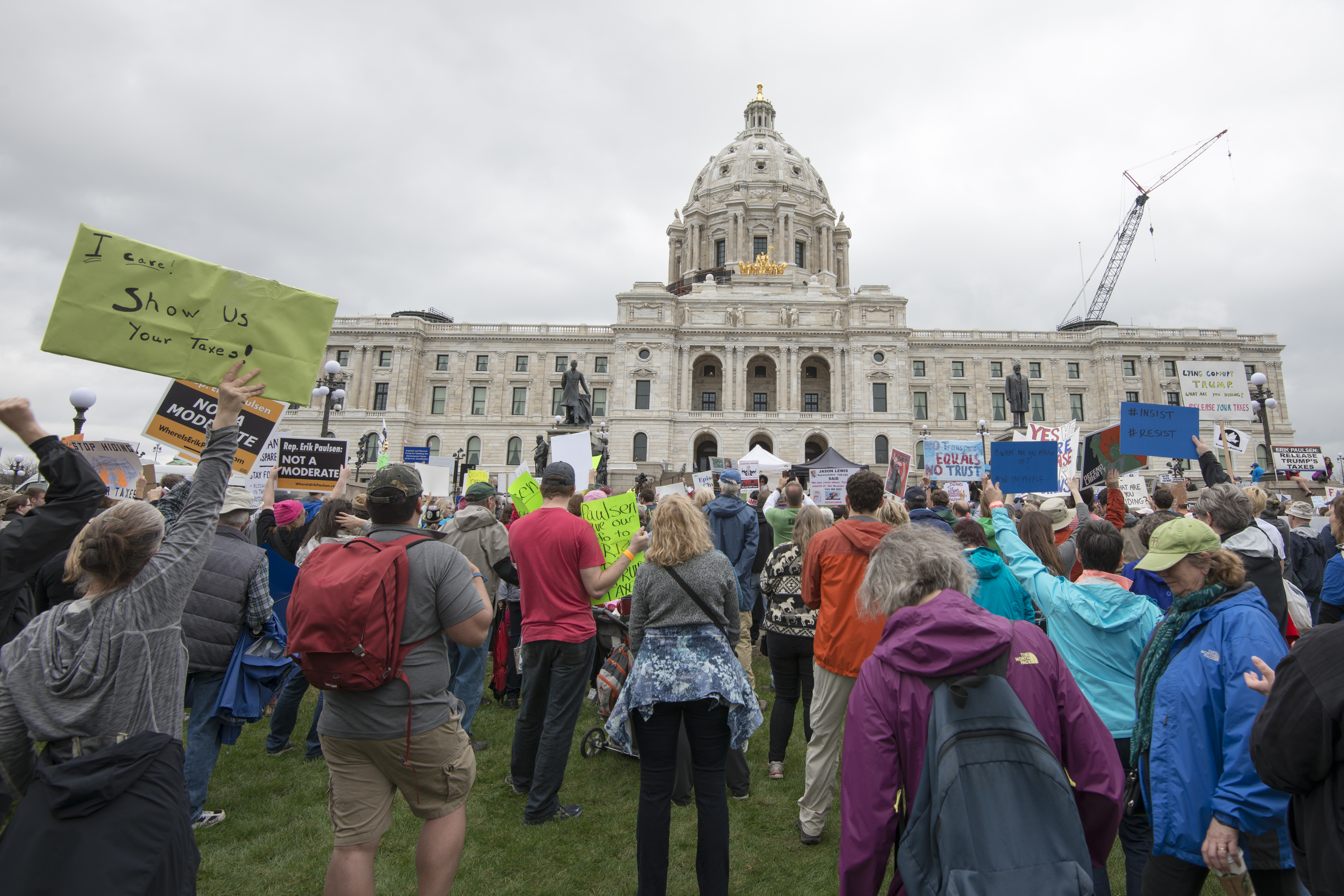
Demonstrators outside the Minnesota State Capitol

About 1,000 Minnesotans attended the MN Tax March in Saint Paul, in front of the Minnesota State Capitol; other rallies were held in Mankato, Rochester, Virginia, and Glenwood. State Auditor Rebecca Otto spoke at the rally in Saint Paul.

==== Missouri ====
A rally took place in Springfield at the corners of Battlefield and Glenstone.

==== Nevada ====
Around 200 protesters gathered around Trump International in Las Vegas. One person, a journalist, was arrested for "trespassing on private property" while filming the protest. Three other people were detained, but eventually released in the protest. The journalist was supported by his employer, KLAS, and was released from jail on Saturday night. Reno held a rally with 500 people at Wingfield Park.

==== New Jersey ====
Rallies took place in Mays Landing, Newton, and Plainfield in New Jersey. In Newark, New Jersey, there were around 100 people who gathered in Federal Square.

==== New York ====
The march in New York City as captured by Voice of America

Hundreds of protesters in Albany gathered outside of the State Capitol. Patricia Fahy was one of the speakers at the rally. Early estimates suggested that the march in New York City attracted 5,000 demonstrators. The march route ran from Bryant Park to Central Park, passing Trump Tower on Fifth Avenue, the former home of Donald Trump. Comedian Sarah Silverman spoke at the New York City protest. In Buffalo, New York, despite the rain, around 200 marchers turned out. The Buffalo march included organizations such as ACTion Buffalo, Buffalo Resists, Huddle for the 27th, We the People and Citizen Action of WNY. There were 80 New Hartford residents demonstrated to call on Trump to show his tax returns.

==== North Carolina ====
Groups in Raleigh, North Carolina walked around the State Capitol to demand that Trump release his taxes. There were hundreds of demonstrators at the March which was organized by Progress NC Action.

==== Ohio ====
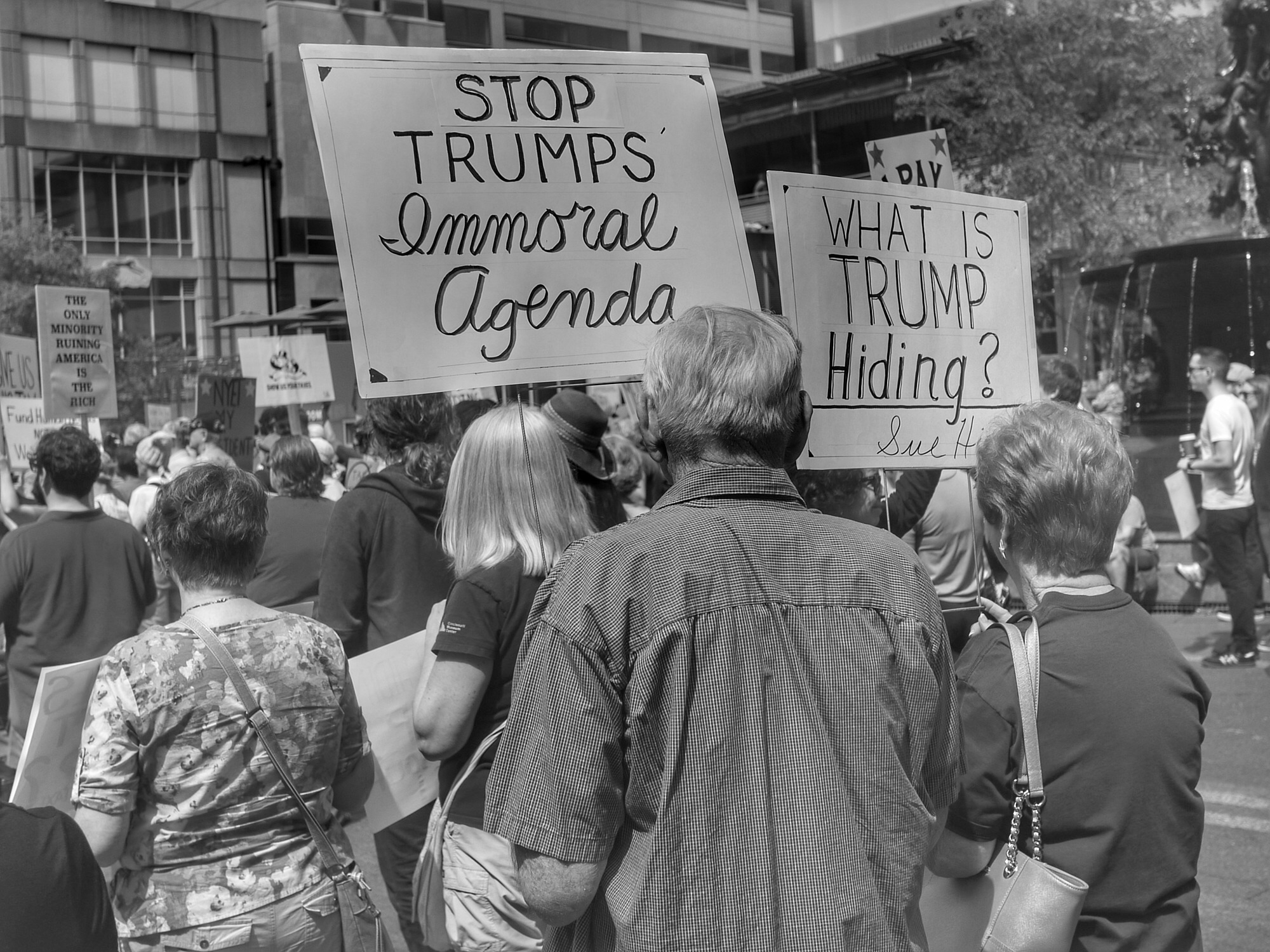
Signs at a Cincinnati demonstration

In Cleveland, the event was called "Cleveland Tax March for People, Peace and Planet: Meet People's Needs Not Corporate Greed," and started out in Willard Park, next to the Free Stamp statue. Marchers moved past the Federal Building and then walked to Cleveland State University. Organizers collected hundreds of letters to Ohio senators from those participating which express their desire to have Trump release his taxes.

==== Oregon ====
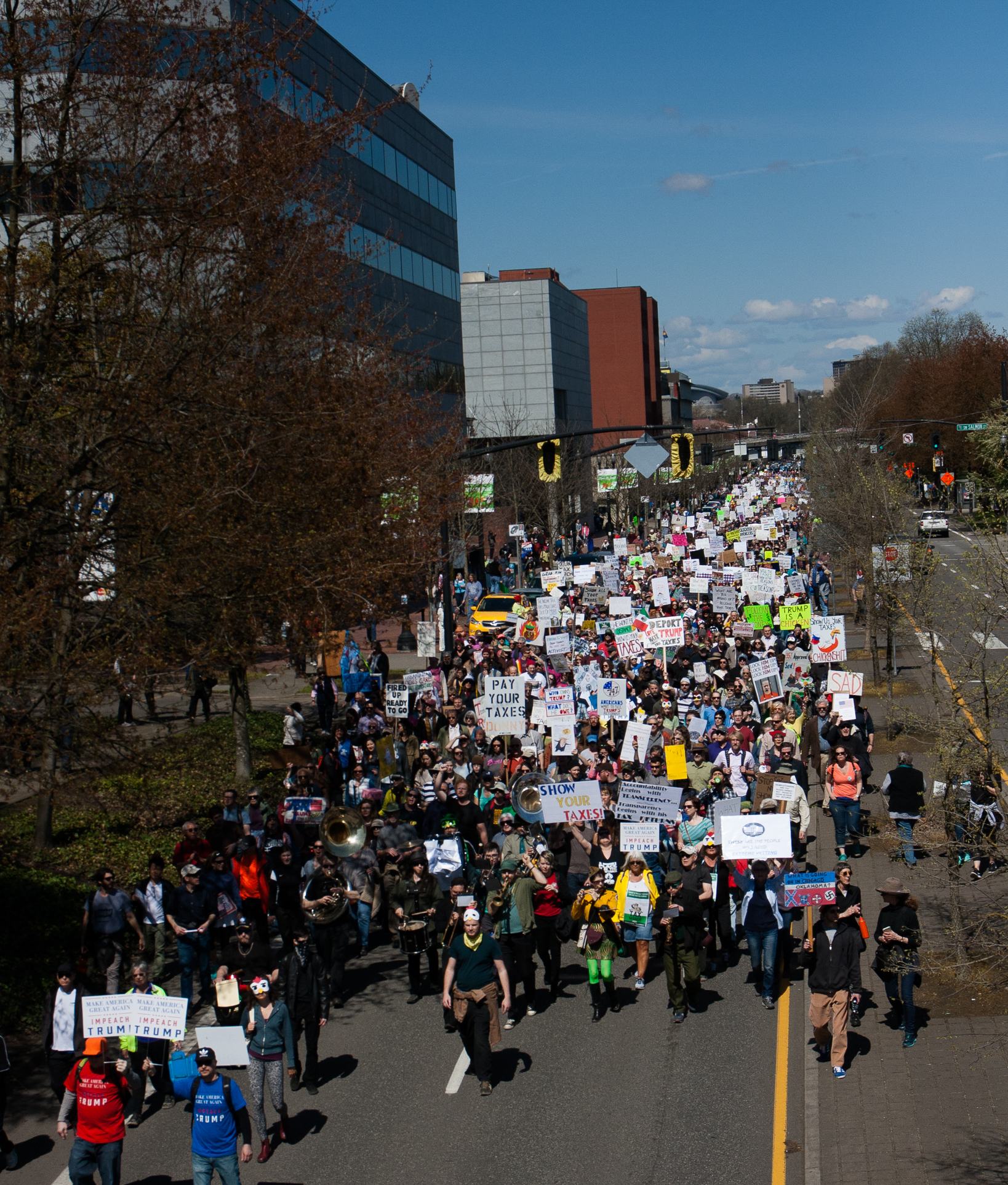
Protesters in Portland

More than 1,000 protests attended the march in Portland. The rally started at 1:30 pm at Terry Schrunk Plaza, and returned to the venue at 2:30 pm. The route for the march is said to have been similar to that of the Women's March on Portland that was organised in January 2017. Post-march activities were said to have continued at the Plaza until 4 pm. The Facebook page for the Portland march has shown that more than 1,600 people have attended.

==== Pennsylvania ====
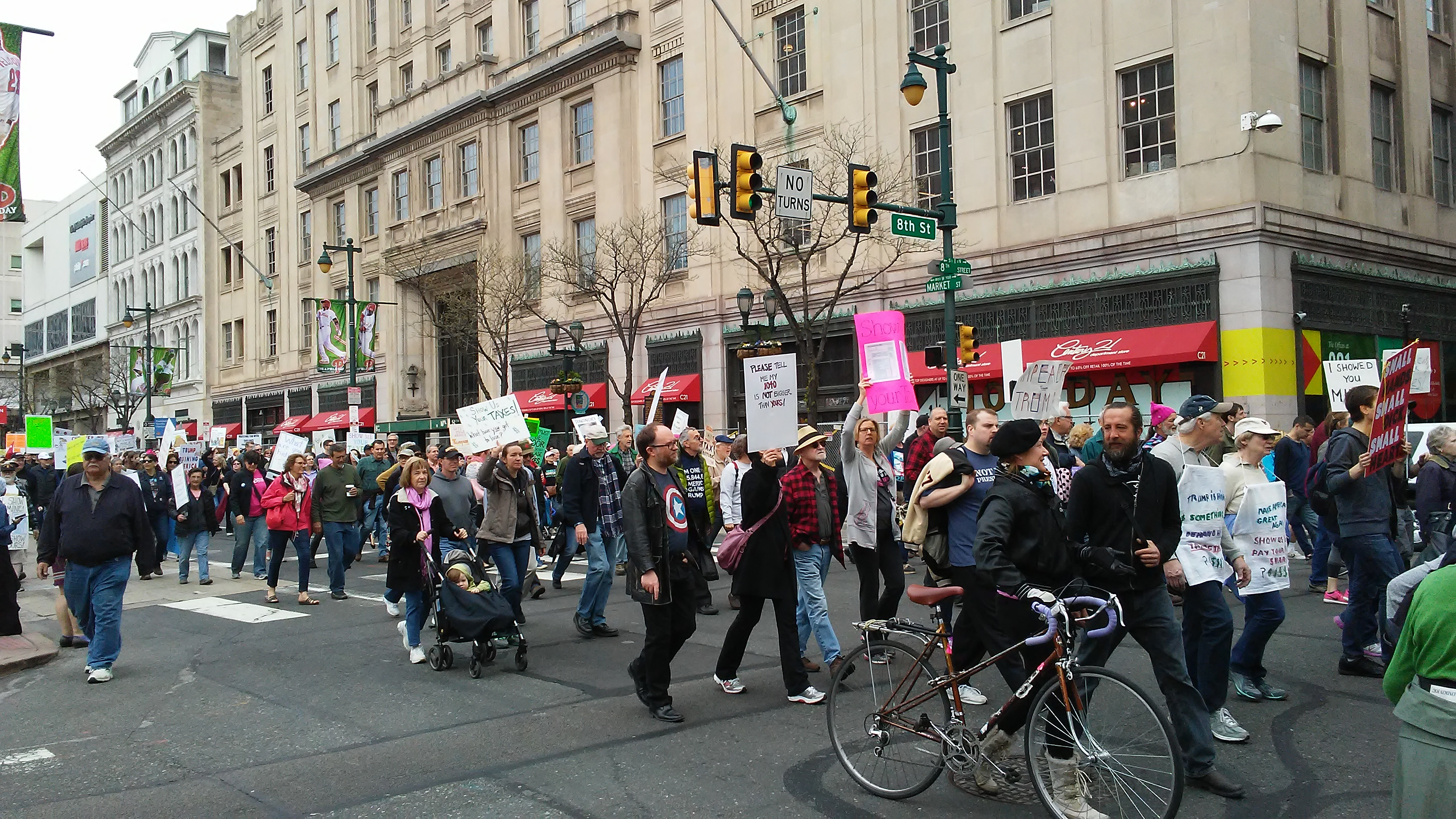
Demonstrators in Philadelphia

More than 200 demonstrators marched in the Bethlehem Tax March. Protesters marched in Philadelphia, Pennsylvania. The Philadelphia marchers took a route from City Hall and ended at Independence Hall. Police estimated that there were around 2,000 protesters; the rally was peaceful. The leader of the march was Devan Spear who is an organizer of the Penn Student Labor Action Project. The march also featured a giant, inflatable chicken. In Wilkes-Barre, protesters started at Public Square and then marched to the Luzerne County Courthouse.

==== South Carolina ====
A small protest took place in Columbia, South Carolina, in front of the State House. In Myrtle Beach, Grand Strand Action Together organized a march which took place at the Market Common.

==== Texas ====
In Austin, well over a thousand demonstrators rallied at the state Capitol. Protesters in Fort Worth marched down Main Street and then rallied at the Tarrant County Courthouse. Representative Sheila Jackson Lee was at the Houston Tax March to support protesters. Hundreds marched in Houston to demand release of Trump's tax forms. People also brought dogs to the march with signs on their collars. The Walker County Democratic Party marched in downtown Huntsville to demand that Trump release his taxes.

==== Utah ====
There were hundreds of marchers in Salt Lake City, Utah. A 10-foot tall "Chicken Don", a large white inflatable chicken stood on the steps of the Salt Lake City and County Building. In the rally, signs and speakers mentioned varied topics including immigration, the Russians, air pollution and the Bears Ears National Monument. The crowd was reported to have chanted "Lock him up!" in unison.

==== Vermont ====
Around 200 Burlington demonstrators marched through downtown to City Hall. Governor Madeleine Kunin attended the rally.

==== Washington State ====
The march in Seattle occurred on the same day, though not at the same time, as the Black Lives Matter 2.0 March. Thousands of people attended the protests, both of which demanded that Trump release his tax returns. The first protest began at 10 am in front of the Internal Revenue Service office, with a number of speeches from local politicians and activists, including U.S. Representative Pramila Jayapal of Seattle, who ended her speech telling a crowd of around 2,000 people that President Trump's assertion that "only reporters" care about his tax returns is "fake news". The second protest began at around 2 pm, and was organized by local Black Lives Matter activists.

=== International ===
International marches were organized in cities including Stuttgart, Germany, Tokyo, Japan, Auckland, New Zealand and London, United Kingdom.

== Aftermath ==
=== Official reactions ===
When asked to comment on the march by The Washington Post on April 13, the White House referred to remarks made earlier in the week by press secretary Sean Spicer, who stated that the President is under IRS audit but has been transparent with his finances. On Easter Sunday, April 16, 2017, Trump tweeted twice about the Tax March. First he tweeted, "I did what was an almost an impossible thing to do for a Republican-easily won the Electoral College! Now Tax Returns are brought up again?" and then, "Someone should look into who paid for the small organized rallies yesterday. The election is over!"

=== Reactions ===
Scarlett Bustos, vice chair of Tax March Sacramento, said "When the administration said that he wasn't going to release his tax returns, he said the people don't care, and we're here to show that nationally that the people do care." Protesters have also appealed to their representatives to urge Trump to release his taxes.

David Myers, a professor at University of California, Irvine said that the march "kind of trolls Donald Trump, and then he almost always responds badly and says something stupid." Jason Silverstein of the New York Daily News commented, "Apparently unable to decide whether the election talk must end or must continue, Trump was also egged by the latest flareups over his tax returns, which even this year's tax filing season has failed to unveil." Nick Merrell tweeted a response to Trump's reaction, "Congratulations, you just confirmed for every single person that marched yesterday that it was well worth their time." Taub also felt that the marches caused Trump to pay attention, since he was tweeting about them the next day.

=== Counter-protests ===
Some Trump supporters planned counter-protests. Pro-Trump rallies were scheduled for April 15 in Colorado Springs, Colorado and Berkeley, California. The Berkeley demonstration, which was not officially related to the Tax March, turned violent, with pro- and anti-Trump groups clashing, and over a dozen arrests. No arrests were made at the Colorado Springs rally.

== See also ==
- Taxpayer March on Washington
