= Trumpy the Rat =

Inflatable caricature of Donald Trump

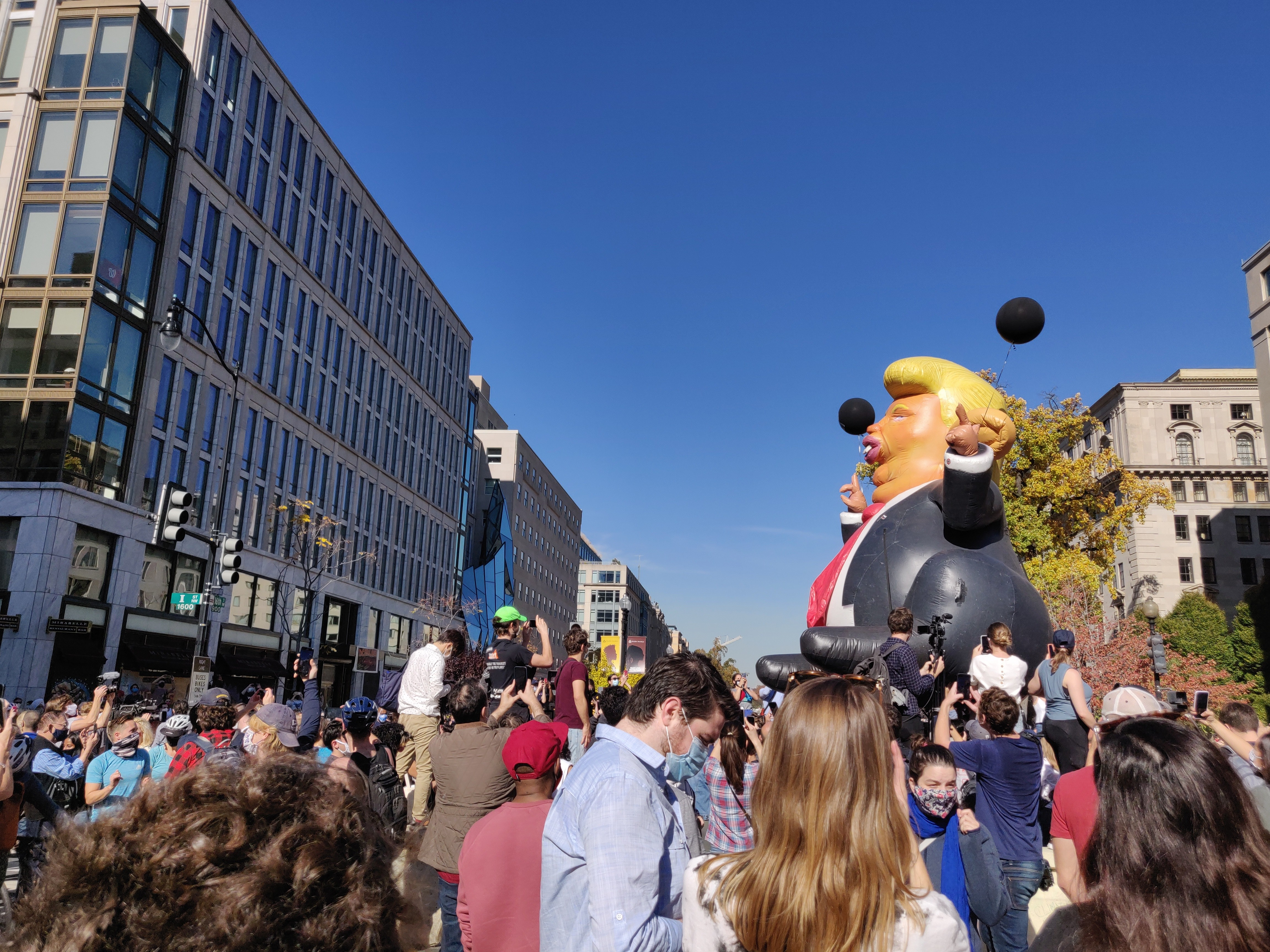
- The rat inflatable in Washington, D.C., during the celebration of Joe Biden's presidential victory
- Artist: Jeffrey Beebe
- Completion date: August 2017
- Medium: Plastic inflatable
- Subject: Donald Trump
- Dimensions: 4.6 m (15 ft)

Trumpy the Rat was a plastic inflatable act as a caricature of the U.S. president Donald Trump. Jeffrey Beebe, a New York City-based artist and BravinLee programs, designed a rat-like inflatable balloon to protest against his speech of hatred, xenophobia, sexism and bigotry. Kickstarter funded the production of this inflatable and used it during anti-Trump protests. It made its first public appearance in August 2017 outside the Trump Tower.

== Background ==
The concept of Trumpy the Rat was inspired by Scabby the Rat, an icon for the American labor. After an artist of BravinLee programs saw a rat in an avenue, he wished to see an inflatable rat that looked like Donald Trump to appear in the protests to show how Trump was being disliked. Trump's speech of hatred, xenophobia, sexism and bigotry was disgusting, and the rat was an iconic symbol to show that. Therefore, he contacted Jeffrey Beebe, and Beebe agreed to create one.

Trumpy the Rat was a 15 feet (4.6 m) tall rat with a human-like face. The rat had an iconic golden hair which symbolized Donald Trump, but keeping some signatures of a rat such as big ears and whistle tooth. The thumb and the index finger of the left hand were gestured in a right angle which became a tick sign, while the thumb and index finger of the right hand were clasped into a circle, making it an OK gesture. The sleeves of the left hand depicted a Confederate icon. It also wore a Lapel pin of the flag of Russia which insinuated Trump's close relationship with the Russian president Vladimir Putin.

== Public usage ==
The rat inflatable made its first public appearance in mid August 2017, at a protest outside the Trump Tower in New York City. Later that month, the rat inflatable was placed outside the White House, and this was not aimed at a symbol of anger or hate, just simply a caricature of Donald Trump. In October, Trumpy the Rat appeared outside the Municipal Services Building of Philadelphia, as part of the birthday celebration of Frank Rizzo, former mayor of the city. Art dealer John Post Lee, who set up the rat inflatable, thought that there were lots of similarities between Rizzo and Trump. Trump's absurd behavior that brought the United States to the lowest point in history.

In December 2018, a protestor installed the rat inflatable on a boat in Palm Beach, Florida, though Trump decided to stay in Washington, D.C. because of the federal government shutdown. The mini protest aimed at impeaching Donald Trump or urged him to resign as the U.S. president.

In March 2019, Trumpy the Rat appeared outside the Trump Tower again. In September 2019, the rat inflatable was placed in Baltimore, ahead of Trump's visit to the city. Trump called the city "disgusting" and full of "rat and rodent infested mess".

After the 2020 United States presidential election, people flew the rat inflatable balloon outside the White House as part of the celebration of Joe Biden's victory.

A rat inflatable appeared during the 2023 Conservative Political Action Conference, which held in National Harbor, Maryland.

== See also ==
- 2017 in art
- Donald Trump baby balloon
- God Emperor Trump
- Trump Chicken
- List of public art in Philadelphia
- List of sculptures of presidents of the United States
- Statues of Donald Trump
