= The Emperor Has No Balls =

Sculpture series depicting Donald Trump by Indecline

- The statue at Jane Warner Plaza at Castro and 17th streets, Castro District, San Francisco
- Artists: Joshua "Ginger" Monroe, for INDECLINE
- Year: 2016
- Dimensions: 195 cm (77 in)
- Location: Cleveland; Los Angeles; New York; San Francisco; Seattle

The Emperor Has No Balls is a series of sculptures depicting a nude Donald Trump, the then Republican presidential nominee, by the activist art collective Indecline.

== Description and history ==
The five statues were installed in Cleveland, Los Angeles, New York City, San Francisco, and Seattle in 2016. Their collective installation was executed by 40 people; Rolling Stone described the precision with which the sculptures were erected: "At exactly 11 in each city – 8 a.m. on the West Coast – two people dressed as construction workers carried out a 6-foot-5 [195 cm], 80-pound [36 kg] object under a blue tarp, brushed away detritus from the ground, spread a thin layer of fast-acting, industrial-strength epoxy, held the object upright for a matter of seconds, and walked away, disappearing into the gathering crowds."

The statues, made using clay and silicone, depicted the president with abdominal obesity, an "old man saggy butt", varicose veins, a "constipated" expression, a micropenis and anorchia, and were titled The Emperor Has No Balls on engraved plates at the base; they were commissioned from Joshua "Ginger" Monroe, a Las Vegas artist who designs monsters for haunted houses and horror films. The Cleveland statue was in the Coventry section of Cleveland Heights; it was taken down within an hour. The New York statue, in Union Square, was removed early that afternoon; the New York City Parks Department made a statement that it "stands firmly against any unpermitted erection in city parks, no matter how small". A bystander bit a piece out of the hair of the San Francisco statue, which was in the Castro District; it was removed early the next day, at a cost of about $4,000 because of damage to the sidewalk. The Seattle statue, which was in Capitol Hill, was claimed by a vintage store, No Parking on Pike, and the Los Angeles statue, on Hollywood Boulevard, by a local art gallery, Wacko, both before authorities could remove them.

The following month, two more naked Trump statues, commissioned by a New Jersey arts collective, were installed on the roof of a warehouse overlooking the New Jersey entrance to the Holland Tunnel, where Indecline also placed an inverted US flag, and on top of a billboard in the Wynwood section of Miami; the Miami statue, which Indecline said was the same one originally placed in New York, was later moved by police request closer to the Wynwood Walls graffiti center.

== See also ==
- Donald Trump in popular culture
- Protest art
- Best Friends Forever (sculpture)
- Dump Trump (statue)
- God Emperor Trump
- In Honor of a Lifetime of Sexual Assault
- King of the World (sculpture)
- Trump Buddha
- The Donald J. Trump Enduring Flame
