= Jennifer Taub =

American academic

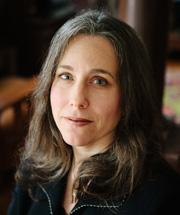
- Born: December 4, 1966 (age 59)
- Education: Yale University (BA); Harvard University (JD)
- Relatives: Shelley Taub (mother)
- Website: www.jennifertaub.com

Jennifer Taub is an American law professor, advocate, and commentator focusing on corporate governance, financial market regulation, and white collar crime.

== Work ==
Jennifer Taub is a Law Professor at Wayne State University Law School, where she teaches civil procedure, corporations, and white collar crime. Before Wayne State, she taught at WNE, VLS, and the University of Massachusetts, Amherst in the Isenberg School of Management. Taub's research focuses on banking reform, corporate governance, financial market regulation, white collar crime and the 2008 financial crisis. Taub also worked as a visiting professor at the University of Illinois College of Law in March 2015, a visiting fellow at the Yale School of Management during the 2016 spring semester, and a visiting professor at the University of Connecticut School of Law during the Spring 2019 semester. Taub will spend the Fall 2019 semester as a visiting professor at Harvard Law.

Taub has also worked as an Associate General Counsel for Fidelity Investments.

Taub has served as a guest commentator on CNN and MSNBC.

=== Tax March ===
Jennifer Taub was a lead organizer of the national Tax March which took place on April 15, 2017, demanding that, among other things, the President release his tax returns. Taub's tweet calling for the protest was inspired by the Women's March.

== Education ==
Jennifer Taub received a B.A. in English from Yale College and a J.D. from Harvard Law School.

== Publications ==
=== Books ===
Taub's most recent book was “Big Dirty Money” published in 2020 by Viking Press. Her first book was Other People's Houses, published in 2014 by the Yale Press. In 2017 Taub released a 6th edition of the casebook, and in 2021 a 7th edition of Corporate and White Collar Crime: Cases and Materials (Wolters Kluwer) originally written by Kathleen Brickey.

=== Articles ===
- “A Thing of Value: Can Opposition Research from Foreign Nationals violate the Federal Election Campaign Act?,” in progress.
- “Law and Economics: Contemporary Approaches,” with Martha McCluskey and Frank Pasquale, Yale Law & Policy Review (2016).
- Film review of The Big Short and 99 Homes with New Labor Forum (2016).
- “The Subprime Specter Returns: High Finance and the Growth of High-Risk Consumer Debt,” New Labor Forum (Jan. 2016).
- “Is Hobby Lobby a Tool to Limit Corporate Constitutional Rights?” Constitutional Commentary (2015).
- “Regulating in the Light: Harnessing Political Entrepreneurs’ Energy for Post-Crisis Sunlight Hearings,” St. Thomas L. Rev. (2015).
- “Reconcilable Differences: Promoting Homeownership While Preventing Systemic Risk,” Annual Review of Insolvency Law (2014).
- “Reforming the Banks for Good,” Dissent (summer 2014).
- “Unpopular Contracts and Why They Matter: Burying Landgell and Enlivening Students,” Washington Law Review (2013).
- “Money Managers in the Middle: Seeing and Sanctioning Political Spending after Citizens United,” NYU Journal of Legislation and Public Policy, vol. 15, 2012.
- “Enablers of Exuberance,” draft paper concerning the relationship between legal acts and omissions and the global financial meltdown, selected for presentation at the Elfenworks Center for the Study of Fiduciary Capitalism at St. Mary's College of California, October 2009.
- “Able But Not Willing: The Failure of Mutual Fund Advisers to Advocate for Shareholders’ Rights,” The Journal of Corporation Law, vol. 34 (2009).
