= Don Lessem =

American dinosaur expert and author

"Dino" Don Lessem (born 1951) is a writer of more than 50 popular science books, specializing in dinosaurs. He was the founder of the Dinosaur Society and the Jurassic Foundation. He is the CEO and founder of Dino Don, Inc., an animatronics company specializing in dinosaurs, dragons, and sea creatures.

== Career ==
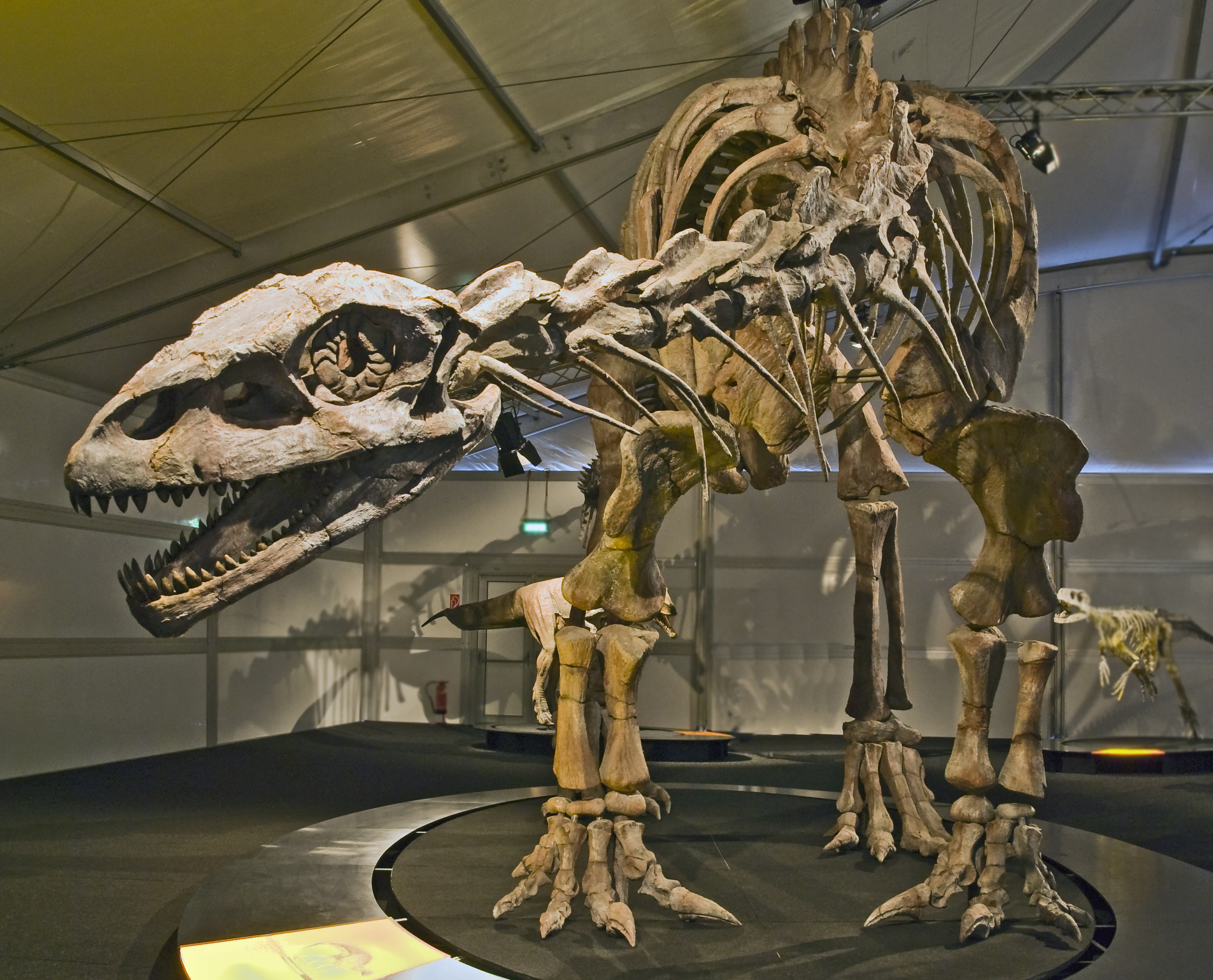
Skeleton reconstruction of Lessemsaurus sauropoides, named after Don Lessem

After a bachelor's degree in art history at Brandeis University and a master's in animal behavior from the University of Massachusetts Boston, Lessem began his writing career as a researcher for the Smithsonian Center for Short-Lived Phenomena. For more than a decade he was a science journalist specializing in conservation issues for the Boston Globe and a contributor to Life, The New York Times, and Smithsonian Magazine.

Lessem's professional interest in dinosaurs developed while he was a Knight Journalism Fellow at MIT in 1988. He wrote his first book, Kings of Creation, in 1990, as a survey of current worldwide paleontology research.

Lessem directed the excavation and reconstruction of a plant-eating dinosaur, the Argentinosaurus, and a carnivorous dinosaur, the Giganotosaurus from Patagonia, in collaboration with Dr. Rodolfo Coria of the Museo Carmen Funes in Plaza Huincul, Argentina.

Lessem's first traveling exhibition company, Exhibits Rex, has created several travelling museum exhibitions of dinosaurs, in addition to an exhibition of Genghis Khan. Lessem's The Real Genghis Khan exhibition has toured museums in North America and Asia since 2009.

Lessem's company Dino Don, Inc. began constructing full-sized robotic dinosaurs in 2017 for zoos and museums worldwide. In April 2019 Lessem opened his Dinosaur Safari exhibition at New York's Bronx Zoo with more than 40 dinosaurs up to 60 feet in length, the largest zoo robotic exhibition in North America. In July 2020 at the Brookfield Zoo in Chicago, the Dinos Everywhere! exhibit featured Lessem's creation of an anatomically correct dinosaur, a Argentinosaurus. Other venues to display Dino Don, Inc. dinosaurs include The Jacksonville Zoo, Philadelphia Zoo, Columbus Zoo, San Antonio Zoo, Copenhagen Zoo, Edinburgh Zoo, and Leipzig Zoo.

Lessem has also authored children's books on extinct animals, endangered species, the Amazon rainforest and the "Iceman". Via his monthly column in Highlights Magazine for a decade, "Dino" Don answered letters from children. He created the non-profit children's newspaper Dino Times, which ran from 1981 to 1984.

Lessem is also the author of several books including Aerphobics, Death by Roller Disco, How to Flatten Your Nose, and The Worst of Everything. His essays have appeared in Punch, The New York Times and The Atlantic.

== Personal life ==
Lessem resides in Media, Pennsylvania. His wife, Valerie Jones, is a non-profit development consultant. His daughters, Rebecca Lessem and Erica Lessem, are respectively an energy company executive in New York City and a public health specialist in tuberculosis, residing in Montreal.

In 2019, Don Lessem (aka “Dino Don”) created an anti-Trump statue known as “Dump Trump.” He deployed his "Dump Trump" robot at anti-Trump protests in London and Washington DC. The 16-foot-high sculpture of Trump sitting on a golden toilet tweets while saying ""No Collusion" "Stable Genius," and "Fake News." It toured the eastern United States in October, 2020 as the "Trump Death Mobile" with a banner "Vote for Me and ie: 200,000 People Have." Lessem is the author of a quote quiz book comparing Trump to dictators and fictional villains, titled Who Said It: Trump Or This Other Shmuck. As of 2026, Mr. Lessem designed and is attempting to raise funds to construct a museum devoted to President Trump's alleged criminal acts, the Trumpmuseumofcrime.com."

== Shark Tank appearance ==
On May 21, 2021, Lessem and his wife, Valerie Jones, appeared on the Season 12 finale of Shark Tank to pitch their business Dino Don Inc. They made a deal with Mark Cuban for a $500,000 investment in exchange for a 25% stake in the company.

== See also ==
- Dump Trump (statue)
