= Statue of Melania Trump =

Statue in Sevnica, Slovenia

- Artist: Aleš Župevc
- Year: 2019 (wood); 2020 (bronze)
- Subject: Melania Trump
- Location: Sevnica, Slovenia; 45.99108°N 15.42695°E

A wooden statue of Melania Trump, sculpted by Aleš "Maxi" Župevc, was installed in her hometown of Sevnica, Slovenia in 2019. The wood carving was commissioned by Brad Downey, an American artist living in Berlin.

The statue was torched on the night of July 4, 2020, and removed soon after. It was replaced by a bronze-cast version in September that year.

== Description ==
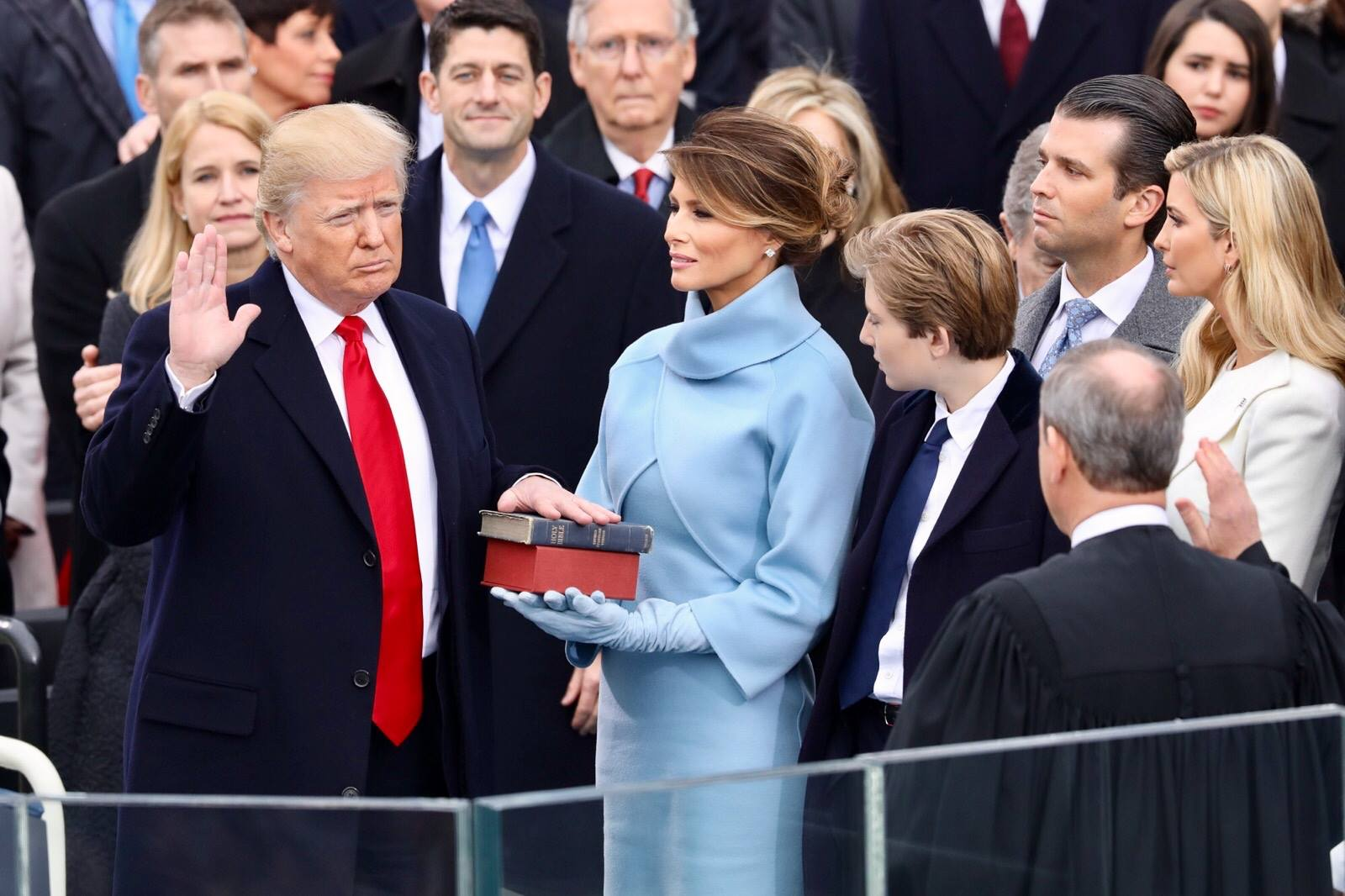
Melania Trump at the inauguration of Donald Trump

The statue is a life-size depiction of Melania Trump. In its original wooden form, the dress and arms of the statue are painted powder blue, to reflect her outfit at the inauguration of Donald Trump.

The original statue was carved out of a poplar tree, (Note: Reporting in The Guardian states that the second statue "stands on the trunk of the same tree." In a separate article by the same author, it's stated that the second statue is "placed on the same tree stump where the wooden statue stood.") and the bronze replacement stands on the same trunk. From the ground to the tip of the statue, it stands 9 feet (2.7 m) tall.

== History ==
=== Wooden version ===
Brad Downey commissioned Aleš Župevc, also known as "Maxi," to create the statue as part of an exposition in Ljubljana. Župevc, an amateur woodworker employed as a pipelayer, carved the statue out of a poplar tree using a chainsaw. The statue was officially unveiled on July 5, 2019.

Following the statue's unveiling, it was met with derision; an ITV report quoted local residents calling it "a disgrace" and comparing it to Smurfette. In an interview with The New York Times, Downey said that "[Župevc] wasn't making a joke."

The statue was set on fire on the night of July 4, 2020, coinciding with American Independence Day celebrations. It was removed by Downey soon after. The burnt statue was exhibited in a seaside town near Sevnica.

=== Bronze version ===
A replacement, cast in bronze, was unveiled on September 15, 2020. The statue was reported as missing on May 15, 2025.

== See also ==
- Cultural depictions of Melania Trump
- Statue of Donald Trump (Slovenia)
