= Dinosaur Safari =

1996 video game

- Developer(s): Creative Multimedia Corporation
- Publisher(s): Mindscape
- Platform(s): Mac; Microsoft Windows
- Release: 1996
- Genre(s): Edutainment
- Mode(s): Single-player

Dinosaur Safari is a 1996 computer game released by Creative Multimedia Corporation and Mindscape. It was released for the Macintosh and PC. Designed by scientists from the Oregon Museum of Science and Industry, Dinosaur Safari is an educational video game intended for children.

== Plot ==
In Dinosaur Safari, the player travels in time and photographs images of dinosaurs and other ancient reptiles for the "National Chronographic Society." Some of the more aggressive dinosaur species will attack the player's vehicle, the Kronos Sphere. As more species are photographed, the player gains access to power-ups such as a video recorder and a call to attract dinosaurs. Captured images and video footage of the dinosaurs are stored on crystals in the National Chronographic headquarters.

== Reception ==
Abandonia praised the game's appeal to children, while noting that its graphics are unimpressive by modern standards.

== See also ==
- Pokémon Snap
