= The Resolute Desk (sculpture) =

2024 art installation in Washington, D.C.

- Year: 2024
- Medium: Sculpture
- Location: Washington, D.C., United States

The Resolute Desk, a satirical political art installation by an anonymous artist "memorializing" the January 6 United States Capitol attack, was installed on the National Mall, in Washington, D.C., in October 2024. The sculpture has been vandalized and received a mixed reaction.

== Description ==
The Resolute Desk is a bronze-colored sculpture by an anonymous artist depicting a poop emoji on Nancy Pelosi's desk. Objects on the desk include file folders, a landline phone, a nameplate, a stack of Post-it notes, and a smartphone.

A plaque reads: "This memorial honors the brave men and women who broke into the United States Capitol on January 6th, 2021, to loot, urinate, and defecate throughout those hallowed halls in order to overturn an election. President Trump celebrates these heroes of January 6th as 'unbelievable patriots' and 'warriors.' This monument stands as a testament to their daring sacrifice and lasting legacy."

== History ==
The artwork was installed in October 2024. A permit was requested by Julia Jimenez-Pyzik via Civic Crafted LLC and granted by the National Park Service. Originally slated to remain installed on the National Mall until October 30, the permit was extended until November 6. The nameplate went missing.

== Reception ==
The work has received a mixed reaction. According to The Daily Telegraph, "Some found it amusing, while others questioned the propriety of the NPS allowing the display just days before a contentious election." Sebastian Smee of The Washington Post wrote, "I think it's brilliant. Beyond brilliant, actually. It may be the most urgently important public monument of our time."

== See also ==
- 2024 in art
