= The Donald J. Trump Enduring Flame =

2024 art installation in Washington, D.C., U.S.

- Year: 2024
- Dimensions: 2.4 m (8 ft)
- Location: Washington, D.C., United States

The Donald J. Trump Enduring Flame was an art installation in Freedom Plaza, Washington, D.C., United States. The stone sculpture was installed at Freedom Plaza on October 28, 2024, and depicted a hand holding a tiki torch in reference to the Unite the Right rally (2017).

According to NPR, "the tiki torch refers to Trump's role in an episode of recent history that many consider shameful and that Democrats have tried to use against him as he runs for reelection".

== Description ==
The approximately 8-foot-tall artwork is a bronze-colored stone column supporting a hand holding a tiki torch. The satirical plaque references the Unite the Right rally (2017) and reads: "This monument pays tribute to President Donald Trump and the 'very fine people' he boldly stood to defend when they marched in Charlottesville, Virginia. While many have called them white supremacists and neo-Nazis, President Trump's voice rang out above the rest to remind all that they were 'treated absolutely unfairly.' This monument stands as an everlasting reminder of that bold proclamation."

== History ==
The sculpture was installed at Freedom Plaza on October 28, 2024, four days after the January 6 United States Capitol attack memorial. A permit was filed by Julia Jimenez via Civic Crafting LLC and granted by the National Park Service. 24-hour surveillance was requested and approved. The sculpture was slated to remain until 5pm on October 31, 2024.

The sculpture was destroyed by two men using skateboards on October 30. One was arrested for property destruction and cocaine possession. According to CNN, the remaining parts of the sculpture were removed by the team behind the project.

== Reception ==
Jennifer Bendery of HuffPost said the sculpture as well as The Resolute Desk (another satirical artwork installed the same week) were "jabs at Trump and his ties to extremists". Both works received significant attention by media outlets.

== See also ==
- Best Friends Forever (sculpture)
- Dump Trump (statue)
- God Emperor Trump
- In Honor of a Lifetime of Sexual Assault
- King of the World (Sculpture)
