= Donald Trump baby balloon =

Inflatable caricature of the U.S. president

- The balloon being flown in Parliament Square in London on 13 July 2018 (Westminster Abbey is in the top left)
- Artist: Leo Murray (idea)
- Designer: Matt Bonner; Imagine Inflatables, Leicester (construction)
- Completion date: July 2018
- Medium: Plastic inflatable
- Subject: Donald Trump
- Dimensions: 6 m (20 ft)

During an official visit to the United Kingdom in 2018 by U.S. president Donald Trump, an inflatable caricature of Trump (colloquially known as the Trump Baby or, less commonly, the Baby Trump) was flown in protest against his visit, his history of alleged sexual misconduct, his leadership style and his policies.

The balloon was flown over Parliament Square, London, on 13 July 2018, where the police estimate that over 100,000 protestors were in attendance, and 50,000 more in the Meadows, Edinburgh, the following day, where protests were also held. Although Trump was not visiting Edinburgh, he was spending the weekend at his Turnberry golf course, but permission to fly the balloon there was refused by Police Scotland.

== Concept ==
One of the organizers, Max Wakefield, described the balloon protest as being in response to "the rise of far-right politics that dehumanises people in order to get into power", and saw it as an attempt to introduce some "good British humour" into the political discourse surrounding Trump's visit. Wakefield cited the Trump administration's family separation policy and Trump's withdrawal of the United States from the Paris climate agreement as examples of the kind of policies which the protest was targeting. Leo Murray, who led the campaign, wrote in its crowdfunding statement:

[When] Trump visits the UK on Friday the 13th of July this year, we want to make sure he knows that all of Britain is looking down on him and laughing at him. That's why a group of us have chipped in and raised enough money to have a 6 meter high blimp made by a professional inflatables company, to be flown in the skies over Parliament Square during Trump's visit.

The 6-metre (20 ft) tall, helium-filled plastic inflatable, also referred to as a "balloon" or "blimp", was designed by Matt Bonner and constructed by Imagine Inflatables of Leicester. It was made after a crowdfunding campaign on Crowdfunder raised the £16,000 cost of its creation and deployment. It depicts Trump as "an angry orange baby" with a snarling mouth, tiny hands, wearing a diaper, and holding a smartphone.

Wakefield said, "The only way that you can make any impact with Donald Trump is to mock him, because you can't engage him in any kind of argument – it never gets anywhere."

== History ==
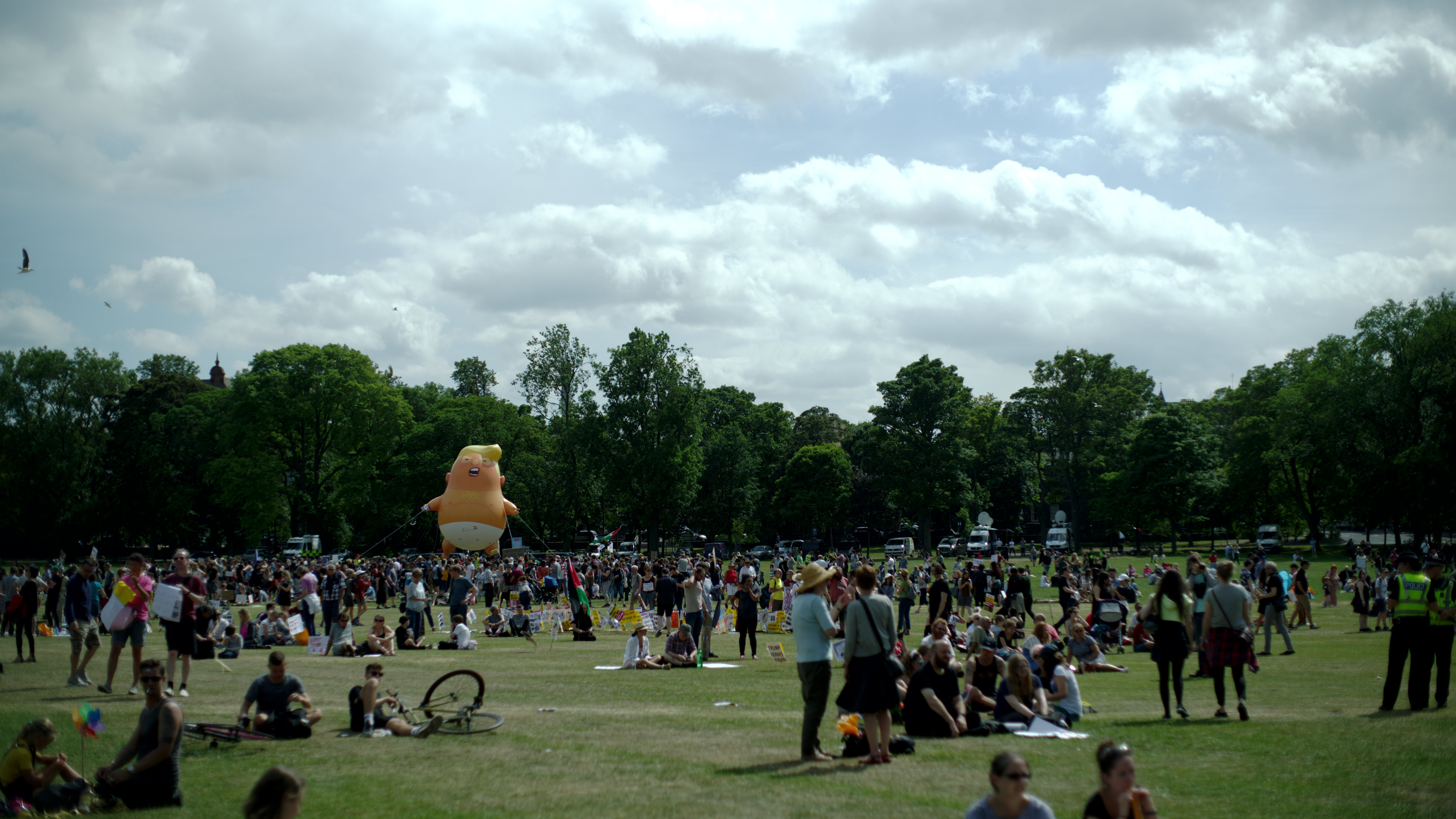
The balloon in Edinburgh during a protest on 14 July 2018

Permission from the Greater London Authority (GLA), Metropolitan Police and National Air Traffic Service (NATS) was required for the balloon to be flown over Parliament Square, the space above which is considered restricted airspace. Permission was granted, allowing it to be flown, while tethered, up to 30 meters (100 ft) high, for up to two hours. Both the GLA's 'City Operations' team and NATS stressed that the nature of the protest did not play a part on their decisions.

After learning of the balloon, Trump remarked, "I guess when they put out blimps to make me feel unwelcome, no reason for me to go to London."

After its appearance in London, the balloon was taken to Edinburgh, where it was flown over the Meadows, a public park near to the city centre, as part of the protests against Trump's two-day-visit to Scotland, permission to fly the balloon near Turnberry golf course having been refused. On 17 July 2018, the balloon was tethered outside the O2 Arena in London during a performance by the American rock band Pearl Jam, with their blessing. Protesters planned to fly the Trump baby balloon in Ireland in November during Trump's visit to the country, but in the event his trip was cancelled.

Museums including the British Museum and the Museum of London expressed interest in acquiring or displaying the original balloon. In January 2021, the Museum of London announced that it had acquired the original balloon and intended to display it alongside other artefacts from the London protest.

=== 2019 London appearance ===
Ahead of Trump's state visit to the UK in June 2019, Sky News ran a commercial featuring the balloon. The blimp was likely to be flown again during this visit, subject to permission from the Metropolitan Police. A crowdfunding initiative arranged for the blimp to fly if £30,000 were raised before Trump's arrival on 3 June 2019; this funding goal was achieved. The Museum of London again said that it would like to exhibit the balloon. The blimp flew at 9:00 am 4 June 2019 in Parliament Square, ahead of the main protest that congregated at 11:00 am in Trafalgar Square. A smaller balloon was prepared to be carried in the march. The smaller balloon was "stabbed with a sharp object" by Amy Dalla Mura, a pro-Trump supporter later that day; the woman was arrested and charged.

== Appearances outside the UK ==
=== United States ===
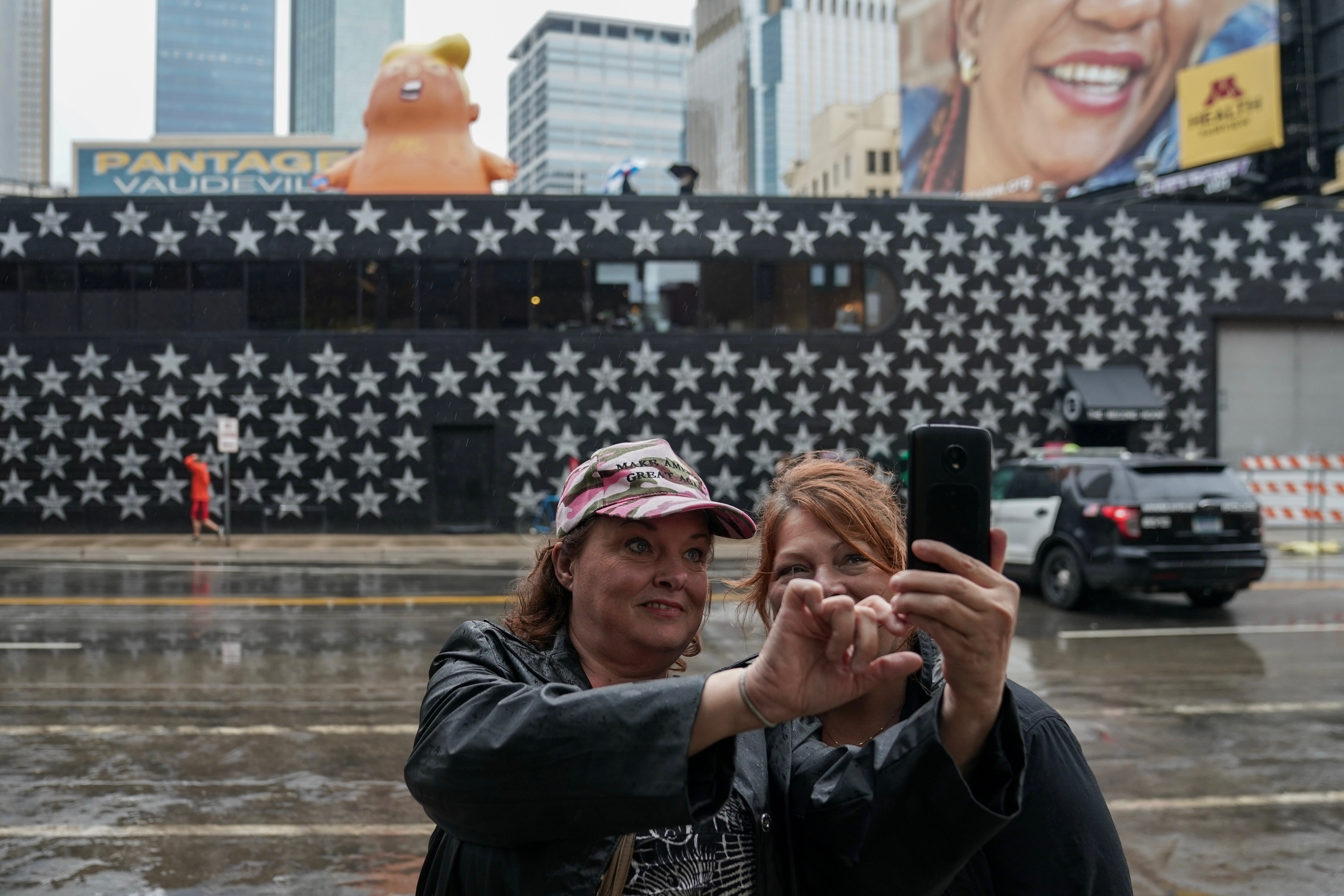
Trump supporters taking a photo with the balloon in Minneapolis, Minnesota

A group of activists in New Jersey raised nearly US$24,000 in a GoFundMe campaign to purchase Baby Trump balloons that they planned to fly over Trump National Golf Club in Bedminster, New Jersey. Initially, they sought US$4,500 to purchase one balloon. Their fund raising was so successful that they were able to purchase six balloons in all. The balloons are available for "adoption" by groups for events in other states. Copies of the "Baby Trump", sometimes referred to as the "baby blimp", balloon have appeared across the U.S. in Florida, Michigan, California, Chicago, New York and Washington, among other places.

On 22 September 2018, a balloon was seen flying near Donald Trump's Mar-a-Lago resort in West Palm Beach at a rally to mark the anniversary of Hurricane Maria striking Puerto Rico.

On 2 October, the balloon appeared at a Spokane, Washington, protest when Vice President Mike Pence traveled to Washington to support the reelection of Representative Cathy McMorris Rodgers. Baby Trump made an appearance at a 13 October 2018, Woman's March rally in Chicago, Illinois. The march was organized to encourage female political activism leading up to the November midterm elections. The balloon made its California debut at the Los Angeles Convention Center on 19 October 2018 during the Politicon. On 27 October 2018, the Trump balloon was flown in West Hollywood, California and Grand Rapids, Michigan. The Grand Rapids co-organizer stated, "It's meant to be fun, but we're also making the point that this guy is dangerous and he's a little unhinged. We want to make the point that this administration is taking us down what we think is the wrong path and is threatening to democracy, to our moral standing in the world." On 28 October 2018, the Baby Trump balloon made an appearance in New York City at an "Impeachment parade."

The blimp appeared on 19 January 2019 at Los Angeles Women's March, and at a protest rally outside Trump's re-election campaign launch in Orlando on 18 June 2019.

The balloon made an appearance during 4 July 2019 Independence Day festivities at the Salute to America event on the National Mall. The National Park Service granted a permit for its use. The balloon was seen at the 2019 San Diego Comic-Con on 20 July. It flew again on 21 September in Ventura, California.

The balloon appeared in Lexington, Kentucky, outside of the city's courthouse on 4 November 2019 in protest of Trump's visit to the city.

The balloon appeared in Tuscaloosa, Alabama, for the NCAA College Football game between the #2 LSU Tigers and the #3 Alabama Crimson Tide on 9 November 2019 at Bryant–Denny Stadium. President Trump attended the game while protesters flew the balloon at Tuscaloosa's Monnish Park. At that appearance the balloon was slashed by Hoyt Hutchinson. Hutchinson was taken into police custody.

The balloon appeared in Tulsa, Oklahoma, on 20 June 2020 to protest his rally there. It was the first time President Trump had hosted a rally since the COVID-19 pandemic began to spread in the United States.

=== France ===
The balloon appeared in Paris on 11 November 2018, at a march protesting about Trump's visit to attend the ceremonies of the 100th anniversary of the end of World War I. Speaking to a CNN journalist, one protester said, "I think Paris should be protesting not only Trump's presence here, but also should be trying to send a message to President Macron for having invited him here, especially on the anniversary of the signing of the armistice."

=== Argentina ===
On 29 November 2018, the Trump Baby was flown in Argentina in protest during the G20 Buenos Aires summit.

=== Ireland ===
From London the blimp moved to Ireland, and appeared at 6:00 pm, on 6 June 2019, at the "Stop Trump Ireland" protest at the Garden of Remembrance, in Dublin. Permission was granted by Irish Aviation Authority.

=== Denmark ===
In preparation for Donald Trump's planned visit to Denmark in September 2019, a Danish campaign was launched to have the blimp transported to Denmark and flown during Trump's visit. Despite the visit being cancelled, the blimp still flew over Kongens Nytorv in Copenhagen on 2 September 2019.

== Copycat balloons ==
=== Sadiq Khan ===
On 30 August 2018, pictures of a balloon similar to that of Donald Trump's were circulated, this time depicting London's Mayor Sadiq Khan wearing a bright yellow bikini. The balloon, like the Donald Trump baby balloon, was crowdfunded after £58,000 was raised to create the blimp. Organizers, identified as Yanny Bruere, a 28-year-old sales manager from Northampton, known for anti-semitic tweets, said "a certain amount of respect should be afforded to the leader of the free world and the greatest ally the UK has," and that the balloon was made "in retaliation" to the Trump balloon. It featured Khan wearing a yellow bikini in response to the banning of a series of Protein World advertisements on London's public transport networks, which had shown a woman in a yellow bikini with the slogan "are you beach body ready?". The adverts were criticized for allegedly objectifying women and promoting unrealistic female body images. The adverts were eventually banned, with Sadiq Khan supporting their removal. Khan commented, "If people want to spend their Saturday looking at me in a yellow bikini they're welcome to do so, I don't really think yellow's my colour though." A small crowd gathered to watch as the blimp flew over London's Parliament Square on 1 September 2018. It has made no further appearances. The Sadiq Khan bikini-clad balloon was sold on eBay in August 2019 for £16,000.

=== Boris Johnson ===
During Anti-Brexit protests in London on 20 July 2019, a giant balloon depicting the former mayor of London Boris Johnson was flown over Parliament Square. The balloon depicted Johnson with a pink-face and blonde spiky hair whilst wearing a white T-shirt with a red bus across the front with the words '£350m', in reference to the bus he used during the Brexit referendum campaign. He was also depicted wearing blue shorts with love hearts printed on them with the word 'Nigel' also printed across the front, resembling the Pro-Brexit campaigner Nigel Farage. The "No to Boris, Yes to Europe" protest was against Johnson's view on Brexit and also against him becoming the next prime minister of the United Kingdom.

== See also ==
- God Emperor Trump
- Trump Chicken
- Trumpy the Rat
