= Sela pri Kamniku =

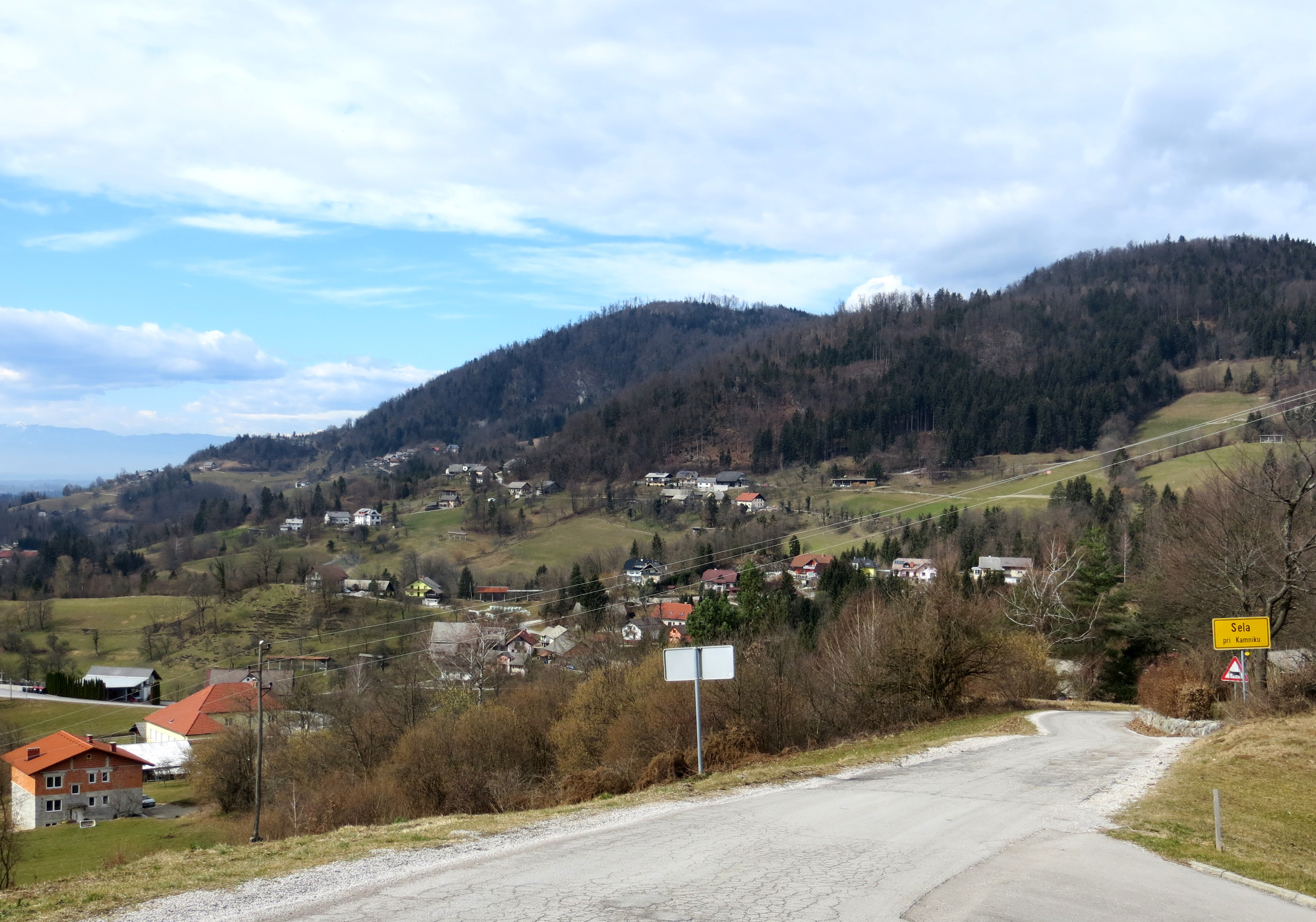

- Location in Slovenia
- Coordinates: 46°14′17.47″N 14°41′10.83″E
- Country: Slovenia
- Traditional region: Upper Carniola
- Statistical region: Central Slovenia
- Municipality: Kamnik

Area
  - Total: 0.78 km^{2} (0.30 sq mi)
- Elevation: 526.2 m (1,726 ft)

Population (2002)
  - Total: 78

Sela pri Kamniku (pronounced [ˈseːla pɾi ˈkaːmniku]) is a small settlement in the Municipality of Kamnik in the Upper Carniola region of Slovenia.

== Church ==
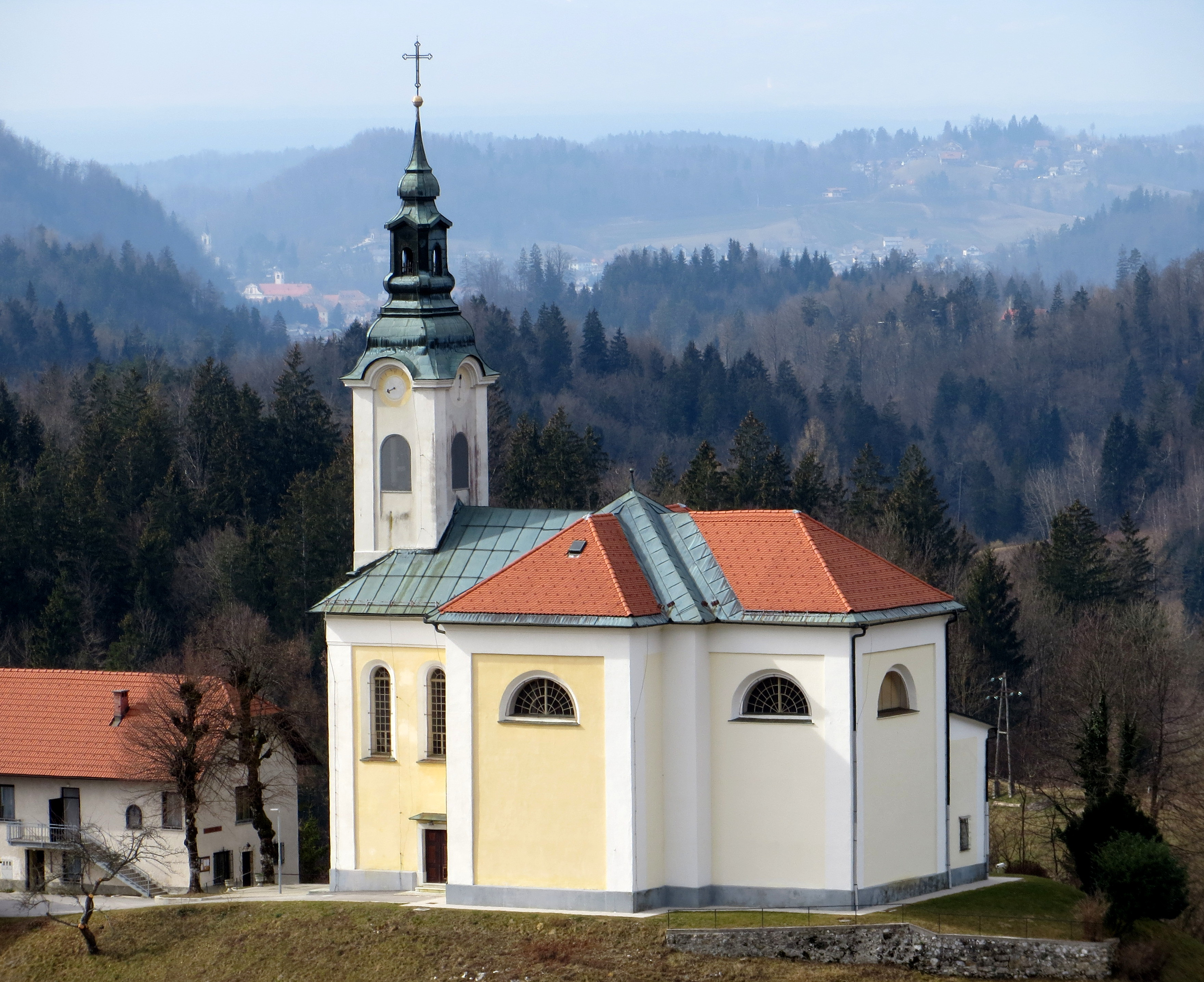
View from east

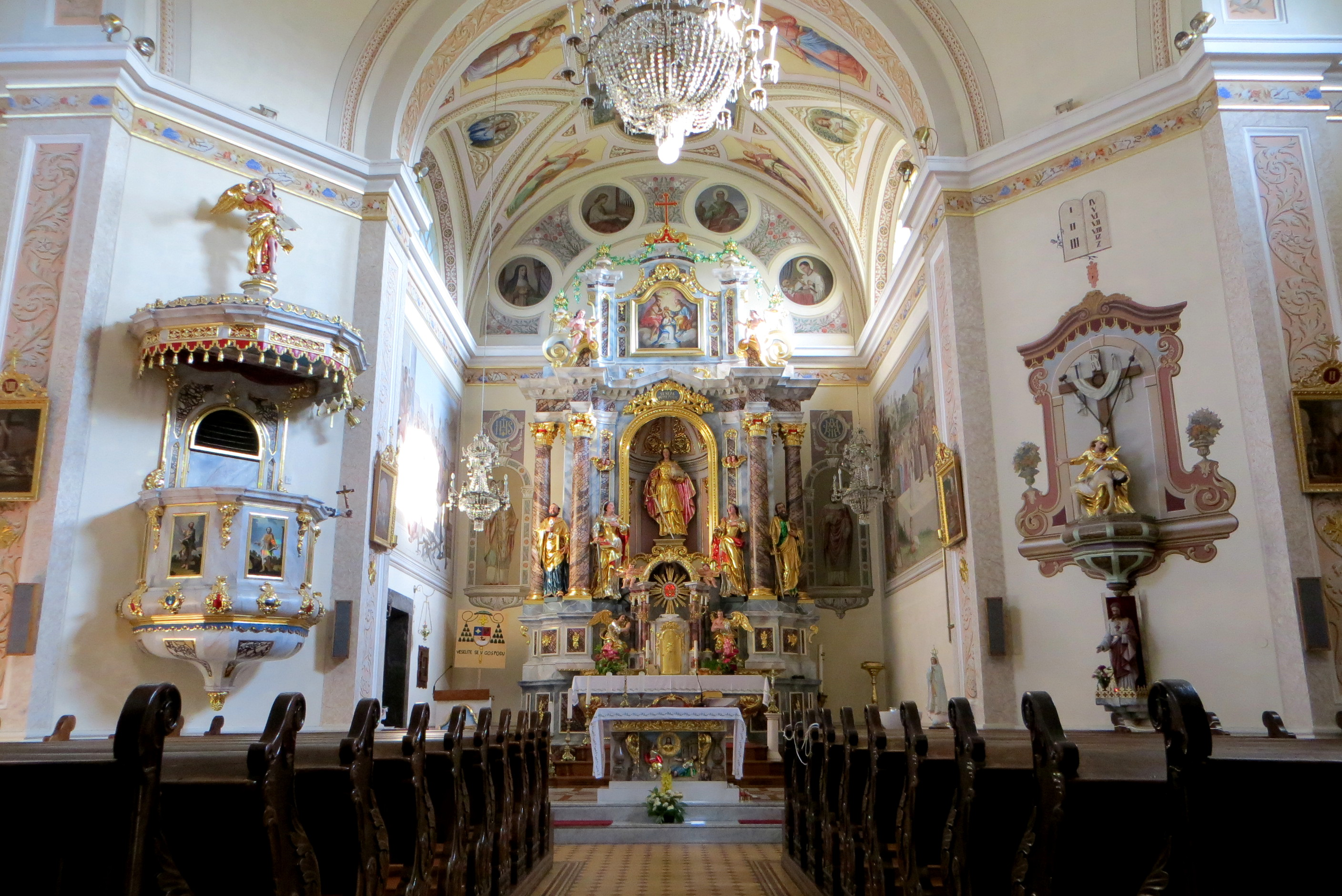
Interior

Saint Agnes's Church

The parish church, dedicated to Saint Agnes, was first mentioned in documents from 1232 and was Romanesque in its origins, although it has been frequently rebuilt and expanded, most recently in 1860.

== Trivia ==
In August 2019, an 8-meter (26 ft) tall wooden effigy of Donald Trump appeared in the village. The sculpture was relocated to Moravče in December 2019 and destroyed in an arson attack in January 2020.
