= Dump Trump (statue) =

Statue of U.S. President Donald Trump

- Artist: Don Lessem
- Year: 2019
- Subject: Donald Trump
- Dimensions: 4.9 m (16 ft)
- Location: 51.50794°N 0.12760°W

Dump Trump is a 16-foot-high (4.9 m) statue of United States president Donald Trump sitting on a golden toilet. The sculpture was temporarily installed in Central London's Trafalgar Square ahead of his 2019 visit to the United Kingdom, and displayed during the Trump-organised Salute to America in Washington, D.C., on 4 July 2019.

== Description and history ==
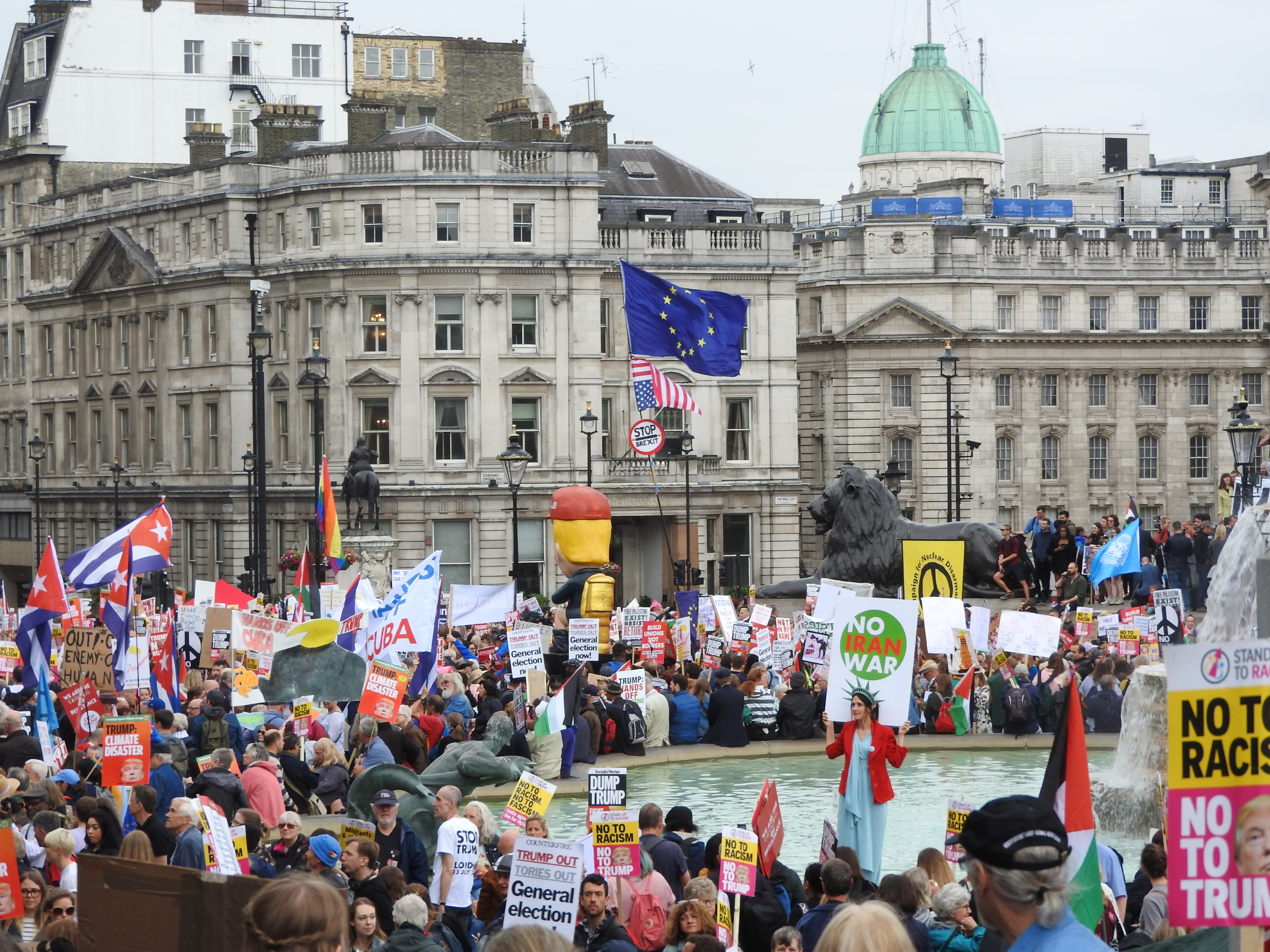
Anti-Trump protest in London's Trafalgar Square. The statue can be seen in the center.

In addition to depicting Donald Trump tweeting from a smartphone on a golden toilet while wearing a MAGA hat with "IMPEACH ME!" scribbled on it, the 16-foot (4.9 m) statue makes flatulence noises and says the phrases "I'm a very stable genius", "no collusion", "witch-hunt", and "you are fake news". The statue was designed by dinosaur expert and author Don Lessem and cost approximately $25,000. "I'm interested in things that are big, not very intelligent and have lost their place in history", the artist commented.

The statue was temporarily installed in Central London's Trafalgar Square ahead of his 2019 visit to the United Kingdom. It was displayed during the Trump-organised Salute to America event in Washington, D.C., on 4 July 2019.

== See also ==
- 2019 in art
- Best Friends Forever (sculpture)
- In Honor of a Lifetime of Sexual Assault
- King of the World (sculpture)
- The Emperor Has No Balls
- Trump Buddha
- The Donald J. Trump Enduring Flame
