= In Honor of a Lifetime of Sexual Assault =

Statues of Donald Trump in the US (2024)

- The statue in Portland, Oregon, with Kvinneakt in the foreground
- Year: 2024
- Medium: Sculpture
- Subject: Donald Trump
- Location: Portland, Oregon; Philadelphia

In Honor of a Lifetime of Sexual Assault is the name of two statues of Donald Trump by an anonymous artist, installed in the United States in October 2024. The sculptures were installed in Portland, Oregon, and Philadelphia. Both were removed soon after installation.

== Portland, Oregon ==
In downtown Portland, a satirical statue of former U.S. president Donald Trump by an anonymous artist appeared on 6th Avenue between Alder and Morrison Streets on October 27, 2024. It was erected next to Kvinneakt (1973–1975) by Norman J. Taylor, which depicts a nude woman. The statue of Trump had a plaque with the text "In Honor of a Lifetime of Sexual Assault" and part of a quote from the Donald Trump Access Hollywood tape:

I just start kissing them. It's like a magnet. Just kiss. I don't even wait. And when you're a star they let you do it. You can do anything. Grab them by the pussy. You can do anything.

The statue had felt clothing spray painted gold, as well as plastic and other materials. It depicted Trump "grinning and making a lewd gesture to passerby", according to the Portland Tribune. Trump was shown wearing a loose-fitted suit and slip-on shoes, with his mouth "twisted into a smirk", his hair "feathered high" as a comb over or a "pompadour of sorts", and his right hand curled in a "lewd" and "suggestive" fashion, according to The Oregonian. The Portland Mercury said the fingers on Trump's left hand were "pinched together in a pervy gesture".

Within hours of being installed, the statue was vandalized in the form of a beheading by an unknown individual. The plaque was later removed by Portland City Council (District 4) candidate Brandon Farley, who has been described as a "right-wing" videographer and calls himself as a "fearless Trump supporter" running to "Make Portland Great Again". Farley filmed himself using a chisel to remove the plaque and shared the video on social media. By the end of October 28, the sculpture was removed entirely, with the exception of one shoe.

== Philadelphia ==
The Philadelphia statue

In Philadelphia, the gold-colored statue was installed near Maja (1942), a bronze statue by German sculptor Gerhard Marcks depicting a nude woman, in Maja Park along the Benjamin Franklin Parkway on October 30, 2024. It depicts Trump "with a cupped hand pointed toward the nude female figure", according to Hyperallergic.

The Philadelphia Inquirer said the sculpture shows Trump with "his right hand held out in a crude gesture". The statue was approximately 8 feet tall and similarly had a plaque on the base with the same quote from the Access Hollywood tape. A permit was not issued for the art installation, which was removed by city workers the same day.

== See also ==
- 2024 in art
- Best Friends Forever (sculpture)
- List of public art in Philadelphia
- List of sculptures of presidents of the United States
- The Emperor Has No Balls
- Trump Statue Initiative
