= Trump Buddha =

Statue of Donald Trump by Chinese artist Hong Jinshi

Trump, the Buddha of Knowing of the Western Paradise
- 西天懂佛 (Chinese)
- Artist: Hong Jinshi
- Year: 2021
- Medium: Statue
- Subject: Donald Trump

Trump, the Buddha of Knowing of the Western Paradise (Chinese: 西天懂佛, lit. 'Sukhavati Buddha of Omniscience'), commonly known as Trump Buddha or Buddha Trump, is a Buddha-inspired statue of Donald Trump by Chinese furniture maker and artist Hong Jinshi.

The statue depicts Donald Trump in a Buddhist robe sitting in a cross-legged position with his hands folded on his lap, and his thumbs pointed outward. In Buddhist art, this pose represents meditation and contemplation. Hong Jinshi began selling copies of the statue on the website Taobao in 2021, with 16-centimeter-tall versions selling for 999 yuan (150 USD), and larger, 46-centimeter-tall versions selling for 3,999 yuan (610 USD). The slogan "Make Your Company Great Again" (a parody of Trump's slogan "Make America Great Again") was used to promote the statue. The statue's listing describes it as "Trump, who knows Buddhism better than anyone". Due to the popularity of the statue, many counterfeit statues were sold on Taobao by other sellers for lower prices. Hong has stated that he hopes to eventually give a copy of the statue to Donald Trump as a gift.

Hong was inspired by the juxtaposition between Buddhist ideals and Trump's personality, particularly the Buddha's calm and collected demeanor compared to Trump's perceived loud and stressed personality despite his personal success in life. He was also inspired by one of Trump's nicknames on Chinese social media: "The King of All-Knowledge". Hong also said that he has no political opinion on Trump, as he is an American president who lives very far away from China.

== See also ==
- Buddha-like mindset
- Statues of Donald Trump
