= John F. Kennedy Memorial =

John F. Kennedy Memorial may refer to:

== Israel ==
- Yad Kennedy

== United Kingdom ==
- J. F. Kennedy Memorial, Birmingham
- John F. Kennedy Memorial, London
- John F. Kennedy Memorial, Runnymede, Surrey

== United States ==
- John F. Kennedy Memorial (Hyannis, Massachusetts)
- John F. Kennedy Memorial (Brooklyn), New York
- John Fitzgerald Kennedy Memorial (Portland, Oregon)
- John Fitzgerald Kennedy Memorial, Dallas, Texas
- John F. Kennedy Eternal Flame, Arlington National Cemetery, Virginia

== See also ==
- List of memorials to John F. Kennedy
- List of statues of John F. Kennedy; see List of sculptures of presidents of the United States § John F. Kennedy
- John F. Kennedy High School (disambiguation)
