= List of sculptures of presidents of the United States =

This is a list of statues and busts of presidents of the United States. Note that some images are excluded due to copyright. To date, there are 17 presidents with sculptures, statues, or physical monuments outside the United States: George Washington, John Adams, Thomas Jefferson, Abraham Lincoln, Rutherford B. Hayes, Woodrow Wilson, Warren G. Harding, Franklin D. Roosevelt, Harry Truman, Dwight D. Eisenhower, John F. Kennedy, Richard Nixon, Ronald Reagan, George H. W. Bush, Bill Clinton, George W. Bush, and Barack Obama.

== John Adams ==
Image	Statue name	Location	Date	Sculptor	Source
	John Adams	Quincy, Massachusetts	2018	Sergey Eylanbekov	
	John Adams	Bilbao, Spain	2011	Lourdes Umerez	
	John Adams	Rapid City, South Dakota 6th Street & Main Street		John Lopez	
	Bust of John Adams	Washington, D.C. United States Senate chamber	1890	Daniel Chester French	

== James Madison ==
Image	Statue name	Location	Date	Sculptor	Source
	James Madison	Harrisonburg, Virginia James Madison University	2002	Unknown	
	James Madison	Harrisonburg, Virginia James Madison University	2008	Unknown	
	Statue of James Madison	Washington, D.C. James Madison Memorial Building	1976	Walker Hancock	
	James and Dolley Madison	Orange, Virginia	2009	Michael C. Quinn	

== James Monroe ==
Image	Statue name	Location	Date	Sculptor	Source
	James Monroe	Monroe, Michigan Monroe County Courthouse	2017	Devon Vergiels	
	James Monroe	Williamsburg, Virginia College of William & Mary	2015	Gordon Kray	
	James Monroe	Charlottesville, Virginia Highland/James Monroe House	1890s	Attilio Piccirilli	

== John Quincy Adams ==
Image	Statue name	Location	Date	Sculptor	Source
	Abigail and John Quincy Adams				
	John Quincy Adams	7th Street & Main Street		John Lopez	

== Andrew Jackson ==
Image	Statue name	Location	Date	Sculptor	Source
	Andrew Jackson	Washington, D.C. United States Capitol	1928	Belle Kinney Scholz and Leopold Scholz	
	Andrew Jackson	Rapid City, South Dakota Mt. Rushmore Road & Main Street		James Michael Maher	
	Equestrian statue of Andrew Jackson	Washington, D.C. Lafayette Square	1852	Clark Mills	
	Equestrian statue of Andrew Jackson	New Orleans, Louisiana Jackson Square	1856	Clark Mills	
	Equestrian statue of Andrew Jackson	Nashville, Tennessee Tennessee State Capitol	1880	Clark Mills	
	Equestrian statue of Andrew Jackson	Kansas City, Missouri Jackson County Courthouse	1934	Charles Keck	
	Equestrian statue of Andrew Jackson	Jacksonville, Florida Jacksonville Landing	1987	Clark Mills	
	Presidents North Carolina Gave the Nation	Raleigh, North Carolina North Carolina State Capitol	1948	Charles Keck	
	Andrew Jackson, A Boy of The Waxhaws	South Carolina Andrew Jackson State Park	1967	Anna Hyatt Huntington	
	Equestrian statue of Andrew Jackson	Independence, Missouri Jackson County Courthouse	1949	Charles Keck	
		Fort Jackson, South Carolina Hilton Field	1967		

== Martin Van Buren ==
Image	Statue name	Location	Date	Sculptor	Source
	Martin Van Buren	Rapid City, South Dakota Mt. Rushmore Road & Main Street		Edward Hlavka	
	Statue of Martin Van Buren	Kinderhook, New York	2007	Edward Hlavka	
	Bust of Martin Van Buren	Washington, D.C. United States Senate chamber	1894	Ulric Stonewall Jackson Dunbar	

== William Henry Harrison ==
Image	Statue name	Location	Date	Sculptor	Source
	Equestrian statue of William Henry Harrison	Cincinnati, Ohio Piatt Park	1899	John H. Mahoney	
	Pediment Depiction of William Henry Harrison	Lafayette, Indiana Tippecanoe County Courthouse	1994		
	Relief of William Henry Harrison	Corydon, Indiana Blaine H. Wiseman Visitor Center	2001	Larry Beisler	
	Statue of William Henry Harrison	Indianapolis, Indiana Soldiers' and Sailors' Monument	1888	John H. Mahoney	
	Statue of William Henry Harrison	Vincennes, Indiana Vincennes University	1972	Harold "Dugan" Elgar	
	Ten O'Clock Line Monument	Gosport, Indiana	1957	Frederick L. Hollis	
	Tippecanoe Battlefield Monument	Battle Ground, Indiana Tippecanoe Battlefield Park	1811	John H. Mahoney	

== John Tyler ==
Image	Statue name	Location	Date	Sculptor	Source
	John Tyler	Rapid City, South Dakota Mt. Rushmore Road & St. Joseph Street		Lee Leuning and Sherri Treeby	
	John Tyler Grave	Richmond, Virginia Hollywood Cemetery	1862		
	Bust of John Tyler	Washington, D.C. United States Senate chamber	1898	William C. McCaulsen	

== James K. Polk ==
Image	Statue name	Location	Date	Sculptor	Source
	James Knox Polk	Columbia, Tennessee Polk Memorial Gardens			
	James Knox Polk	Raleigh, North Carolina North Carolina State Capitol	1948	Charles Keck	
	Presidents North Carolina Gave the Nation	Raleigh, North Carolina North Carolina State Capitol	1948	Charles Keck	

== Zachary Taylor ==
Image	Statue name	Location	Date	Sculptor	Source
	Zachary Taylor	Green Bay, Wisconsin Leicht Park			
	Zachary Taylor	Rapid City, South Dakota 9th Street & St. Joseph Street		Lee Leuning and Sherri Treeby	
	Zachary Taylor Gravesite	Louisville, Kentucky Zachary Taylor National Cemetery			

== Millard Fillmore ==
Image	Statue name	Location	Date	Sculptor	Source
	Millard Fillmore	Rapid City, South Dakota 9th Street & St. Joseph Street		James Van Nuys	
	Millard Fillmore	Buffalo, New York Buffalo City Hall	1930	Bryant Baker	
	Bust of Millard Fillmore	Washington, D.C. United States Senate chamber	1895	Robert Cushing	

== Franklin Pierce ==
Image	Statue name	Location	Date	Sculptor	Source
	Franklin Pierce	Rapid City, South Dakota 9th Street & Main Street		James Van Nuys	
	Franklin Pierce	Concord, New Hampshire New Hampshire State House	1914	Augustus Lukeman	

== James Buchanan ==
Image	Statue name	Location	Date	Sculptor	Source
	James Buchanan	Rapid City, South Dakota 9th Street & Main Street		James Michael Maher	
	James Buchanan	Lancaster, Pennsylvania Buchanan Park			
	James Buchanan Memorial	Washington, D.C. Meridian Hill Park	1930	Hans Schuler	

== Andrew Johnson ==
Image	Statue name	Location	Date	Sculptor	Source
	Andrew Johnson	Greeneville, Tennessee Andrew Johnson National Historic Site	1995	Jim Gray	
	Andrew Johnson	Rapid City, South Dakota 6th Street & St. Joseph Street		James Van Nuys	
	Bust of Andrew Johnson	Washington, D.C. United States Senate chamber	1900	William C. McCauslen	
	Presidents North Carolina Gave the Nation	Raleigh, North Carolina North Carolina State Capitol	1948	Charles Keck	
	Andrew Johnson	Nashville, Tennessee Tennessee State Capitol	1995	Jim Gray	
	Andrew Johnson	Greeneville, Tennessee Greene County Chamber of Commerce	1956	Edgar W. Bowlin	
	Andrew Johnson	Nashville, Tennessee Tennessee State Capitol			

== Ulysses S. Grant ==
Image	Statue name	Location	Date	Sculptor	Source
	Equestrian statue of Ulysses S. Grant	Philadelphia, Pennsylvania Fairmount Park	1899	Daniel Chester French and Edward Clark Potter	
	Ulysses S. Grant Memorial	Washington, D.C. United States Capitol	1902-24	Henry Shrady	
	Statue of Ulysses S. Grant	St. Louis, Missouri	1888	Robert Bringhurst	
	Ulysses S. Grant Statue	West Point, New York United States Military Academy	2019		
	These Are My Jewels	Columbus, Ohio	1894	Levi Scofield	
	Ulysses S. Grant Monument	Chicago, Illinois	1891	Louis Rebisso	

== Rutherford B. Hayes ==
Image	Statue name	Location	Date	Sculptor	Source
	Rutherford B. Hayes	Rapid City, South Dakota 4th Street & St. Joseph Street		Lee Leuning and Sherri Treeby	
	These Are My Jewels	Columbus, Ohio	1894	Levi Scofield	

== James A. Garfield ==
Image	Statue name	Location	Date	Sculptor	Source
	James A. Garfield Monument	Washington, D.C. United States Capitol	1887	John Quincy Adams Ward	
	James A. Garfield	Cincinnati, Ohio Piatt Park		Charles Henry Niehaus	
	James A. Garfield	Washington, D.C. United States Capitol		Charles Henry Niehaus	
	These Are My Jewels	Columbus, Ohio	1894	Levi Scofield	

== Chester A. Arthur ==
Image	Statue name	Location	Date	Sculptor	Source
	Chester Arthur	Rapid City, South Dakota 5th Street & Main Street		John Lopez	
	Chester Arthur	Schenectady, New York Union College			
	Statue of Chester A. Arthur	New York City, New York	1899	George Edwin Bissell	
	Bust of Chester A. Arthur	Washington, D.C. United States Senate chamber	1891	Augustus Saint-Gaudens	
	Chester Arthur Bust	Washington, D.C. Smithsonian American Art Museum	1883	Lot Flannery	

== Grover Cleveland ==
Image	Statue name	Location	Date	Sculptor	Source
	Grover Cleveland	Rapid City, South Dakota 4th Street & St. Joseph Street		James Michael Maher	
	Grover Cleveland	Buffalo, New York Buffalo City Hall	1932	Bryant Baker	
	Grover Cleveland	Buffalo, New York Grover Cleveland High School		Unknown	

== Benjamin Harrison ==
Image	Statue name	Location	Date	Sculptor	Source
	Benjamin Harrison	Indianapolis, Indiana	1908	Charles Henry Niehaus	
	Benjamin Harrison	Rapid City, South Dakota 4th Street & Main Street		John Lopez	

== William McKinley ==
Image	Statue name	Location	Date	Sculptor	Source
	William McKinley	Rapid City, South Dakota		Lee Leuning and Sherri Treeby	
	Statue of William McKinley	Canton, Ohio	1905	Haig Patigian	
	Statue of William McKinley	Chicago	1905	Charles Mulligan	
	McKinley National Memorial Statue	Canton, Ohio McKinley National Memorial	1907	Harold Van Buren Magonigle	
	National McKinley Birthplace Memorial Statue	Niles, Ohio National McKinley Birthplace Memorial	1915	J. Massey Rhind	
	William McKinley Monument	Columbus, Ohio Ohio Statehouse	1903-06	Hermon Atkins MacNeil and Carol Brooks MacNeil	

== Theodore Roosevelt ==
Image	Statue name	Location	Date	Sculptor	Source
	Theodore Roosevelt	Rapid City, South Dakota 9th Street & Main Street		John Lopez	
	Theodore Roosevelt Island Statue	Washington, D.C. Theodore Roosevelt Island	1967	Paul Manship	
	Theodore Roosevelt, Rough Rider	Portland, Oregon South Park Blocks	1922	Alexander Phimister Proctor	
	Equestrian Statue of Theodore Roosevelt	New York City, New York American Museum of Natural History	1939	James Earle Fraser	
	Theodore Roosevelt Bust	Washington, D.C. United States Senate chamber	1910	James Earle Fraser	
	Bust of Theodore Roosevelt	Boston, Massachusetts	1919	Gutzon Borglum	

== William Howard Taft ==
Image	Statue name	Location	Date	Sculptor	Source
	William Howard Taft	Rapid City, South Dakota Mt. Rushmore Road & Main Street		Lee Leuning and Sherri Treeby	
	William Howard Taft	Cincinnati, Ohio	1992	Michael D. Bigger	

== Woodrow Wilson ==
Image	Statue name	Location	Date	Sculptor	Source
	Woodrow Wilson	Rapid City, South Dakota 9th Street & St. Joseph Street		James Michael Maher	
	Woodrow Wilson Monument	Prague, Czech Republic Praha hlavní nádraží	2011		
	Statue of Woodrow Wilson	Austin, Texas University of Texas at Austin	1933	Pompeo Coppini	

== Warren G. Harding ==
Image	Statue name	Location	Date	Sculptor	Source
	Warren G. Harding	Rapid City, South Dakota 9th Street & St. Joseph Street		John Lopez	
	Harding	Vancouver, Canada Stanley Park			

== Calvin Coolidge ==
Image	Statue name	Location	Date	Sculptor	Source
	Calvin Coolidge	Rapid City, South Dakota 5th Street & Main Street		John Lopez	
		Plymouth, Vermont Coolidge Homestead			
	Calvin Coolidge Bust	Washington, D.C. United States Senate chamber	1927	Moses A. Wainer Dykaar	

== Herbert Hoover ==
Image	Statue name	Location	Date	Sculptor	Source
	Herbert Hoover	Rapid City, South Dakota 5th Street & Main Street		James Michael Maher	

== Harry S. Truman ==
Image	Statue name	Location	Date	Sculptor	Source
	Harry S. Truman	Rapid City, South Dakota Mt. Rushmore Road & St. Joseph Street		James Michael Maher	
	Harry S. Truman	Independence, Missouri Jackson County Courthouse			
	Harry S. Truman Bust	Washington, D.C. United States Senate chamber	1947	Charles Keck	
	Harry S. Truman	Washington, D.C. United States Capitol	2022	Tom Corbin	

== Dwight D. Eisenhower ==
Image	Statue name	Location	Date	Sculptor	Source
	Dwight D. Eisenhower	Washington, D.C. United States Capitol	2003	Jim Brothers	
	Dwight D. Eisenhower	Topeka, Kansas Kansas State Capitol			
	Dwight D. Eisenhower	Denison, Texas Eisenhower Birthplace State Historic Site			
	Dwight D. Eisenhower Memorial Three statues: one as a boy, one as general, and one as president	Washington, D.C.	2020	Sergey Eylanbekov	
	Dwight D. Eisenhower Statue	London, England Grosvenor Square	1989	Robert Lee Dean	
	Eisenhower Statue	Alexandria, Virginia Eisenhower Avenue Traffic Circle			
	Eisenhower Monument	West Point, New York United States Military Academy	1983	Robert L. Dean Jr.	
	Eisenhower Veteran's Monument	Denison, Texas			
	Statue of Dwight D. Eisenhower	Abilene, Kansas Dwight D. Eisenhower Presidential Library			

== John F. Kennedy ==
Image	Statue name	Location	Date	Sculptor	Source
	John F. Kennedy	San Juan, Puerto Rico Puerto Rico Capitol			
	John F. Kennedy	Pittston, Pennsylvania			
	Statue of John F. Kennedy	Boston, Massachusetts	1988	Isabel McIlvan	
	John F. Kennedy Memorial	London, England International Students House, London	1965	Jacques Lipchitz	
	John F. Kennedy Memorial	Hyannis, Massachusetts Ocean Street	1966		
	John F. Kennedy Memorial and Bust	Holyoke, Massachusetts Holy Cross Church	1967		
	J. F. Kennedy Memorial	Long Beach, New York Kennedy Plaza			
	Bust of Kennedy	Newark, New Jersey Military Park	1965	Jacques Lipchitz	
	Bust of John F. Kennedy	Nashua, New Hampshire Downtown	1965	Evangelos Frudakis	
	Bust of President Kennedy	New York City, New York Grand Army Plaza	1965		
	Bust of President John F. Kennedy	Boston, Massachusetts John F. Kennedy Presidential Library and Museum		Felix de Weldon	
	The John F. Kennedy Bust	Washington, D.C. John F. Kennedy Center for the Performing Arts	1971	Robert Berks	
	John F. Kennedy Statue	New Ross, County Wexford, Ireland	2008	Ann Meldon Hugh	
	Statue of President John F. Kennedy	Bruff, County Limerick, Ireland	2019	Sean Connolly	
	President John F. Kennedy	Washington, D.C. John F. Kennedy Center for the Performing Arts	2021	StudioEIS	

== Lyndon B. Johnson ==
Image	Statue name	Location	Date	Sculptor	Source
	Lyndon B. Johnson	Stonewall, Texas Lyndon B. Johnson National Historical Park			
	Lyndon B. Johnson	Killeen, Texas Central Texas College			
	Lyndon B. Johnson	Rapid City, South Dakota 7th Street & Main Street		James Michael Maher	
	Lyndon Baines Johnson	San Marcos, Texas Texas State University			
	Lyndon B. Johnson Bust	Washington, D.C. United States Senate chamber	1966	Jimilu Mason	
	Lyndon B. Johnson	Houston, Texas Little Tranquility Park	1995	Chas Fagan	

== Richard Nixon ==
Image	Statue name	Location	Date	Sculptor	Source
	Richard Nixon	Wakefield, New Zealand			
	Richard Nixon	Rapid City, South Dakota 5th Street & St. Joseph Street		Edward E. Hlavka	
	Richard M. Nixon Bust	Washington, D.C. United States Senate chamber	1966	Gualberto Rocchi	

== Gerald Ford ==
Image	Statue name	Location	Date	Sculptor	Source
	Gerald Ford	Rapid City, South Dakota 7th Street & St. Joseph Street		James Michael Maher	
	Gerald R. Ford	Washington, D.C. United States Capitol	2011	J. Brett Grill	
	Gerald R. Ford	Albion, Michigan Albion College	2012		
	Gerald R. Ford Bust	Washington, D.C. United States Senate chamber	1985	Walker Kirtland Hancock	

== Jimmy Carter ==
Image	Statue name	Location	Date	Sculptor	Source
	Jimmy Carter Peanut Statue	Plains, Georgia	1976		
	Jimmy Carter	Rapid City, South Dakota 6th Street & St. Joseph Street		John Lopez	
	Statue of Jimmy Carter	Atlanta, Georgia Georgia State Capitol	1994	Frederick Hart	

== Ronald Reagan ==
Image	Statue name	Location	Date	Sculptor	Source
	Ronald Reagan	Washington, D.C. United States Capitol	2009	Chas Fagan	
	Ronald Reagan	Arlington, Virginia Ronald Reagan Washington National Airport	2011	Chas Fagan	
	Ronald Reagan	Rapid City, South Dakota 6th Street & St. Joseph Street		James Michael Maher	
	Ronald Reagan	London, England Grosvenor Square	2011	Chas Fagan	
	Ronald Reagan	Berlin, Germany Embassy of the United States, Berlin	2019	Chas Fagan	
	Reagan	Covington, Louisiana N. New Hampshire Street & E. Lockwood Street			
	President Reagan Mounument	Miami, Florida Tropical Park	2018	Carlos Enrique Prado	
	President and Mrs. Reagan	Simi Valley, California Ronald Reagan Presidential Library and Museum		Chas Fagan	
	Ronald Reagan	Southern Park, Sofia, Bulgaria	2017		
	Ronald Reagan	Budapest, Hungary	2011		

== George H. W. Bush ==
Image	Statue name	Location	Date	Sculptor	Source
	George H. W. Bush as a WW2 pilot	U.S.S. George H. W. Bush	2008	Chas Fagan	
	George Bush Sr.	Rapid City, South Dakota 6th Street & Main Street		Edward E. Hvlaka	
	George H.W. Bush	Hampton, Virginia Hampton University			
	George H.W. Bush	Langley, Virginia CIA Headquarters			
	George H. W. Bush Bust	Washington, D.C. United States Senate chamber	1990	Walker Kirtland Hancock	
	George H. W. Bush Monument	Houston, Texas		Chas Fagan	
	George H. W. Bush Airport Monument	Houston, Texas George Bush Intercontinental Airport	1990	David Dickes	
	Fathers of Unity	Berlin, Germany Axel Springer High Rise (Berlin)	2010	Serge Mangin	
	George H.W. Bush	Budapest, Hungary Liberty Square	2020		
	George Bush Jr. & Sr.	Dallas, Texas George W. Bush Presidential Center	2013	Chas Fagan	
	George H. W. Bush	Berlin, Germany Embassy of the United States, Berlin	2023	Chas Fagan	

== Bill Clinton ==
Image	Statue name	Location	Date	Sculptor	Source
	Bill Clinton	Rapid City, South Dakota 7th Street & St. Joseph Street		Lee Leuning and Sherri Treeby	
	Bill Clinton	Pristina, Kosovo Bill Clinton Boulevard	2009		
	President Bill Clinton	Ballybunion, Ireland			

== George W. Bush ==
Image	Statue name	Location	Date	Sculptor	Source
	George W. Bush	Fushë-Krujë, Albania	2011		
	George W. Bush	Hamilton, Ohio Hamilton High School			
	George Bush Jr. & Sr.	Dallas, Texas George W. Bush Presidential Center	2013	Chas Fagan	
	George W. Bush	Rapid City, South Dakota St. Joseph Street & 5th Street	2010	James Michael Maher	

== Barack Obama ==
Image	Statue name	Location	Date	Sculptor	Source
	Barack Obama	State Elementary School Menteng 01 Menteng, Jakarta	2010		
	Barack Obama	San Juan, Puerto Rico Puerto Rico Capitol	2012		
	Barack Obama	Hampton, Virginia Hampton University	2019	Jon Hair	
	Barack and Michelle Obama	Moneygall, Ireland Barack Obama Plaza	2018	Mark Rhodes	
	Saraswati	Embassy of Indonesia, Washington, D.C.	2013		
	Barack Obama	Rapid City, South Dakota Trinity Eco Prayer Park	2019	James Van Nuys	
	Barack Obama	Leesburg, Virginia Douglass Community Center	2025	Jeff Hall	
	Barack and Michelle Obama	Chicago Barack Obama Presidential Center	2026	StudioEIS	

== Donald Trump ==
Image	Statue name	Location	Date	Sculptor	Source
	Donald Trump	Rapid City, South Dakota	2025	Jim Maher	

=== Satirical ===
Image	Statue name	Location	Date	Sculptor	Source
	Statue of Donald Trump (Slovenia)	Sela pri Kamniku, Slovenia	2019	Tomaz Schlegl	
	Dump Trump	Trafalgar Square	2019	Don Lessem	
	The Emperor Has No Balls	Cleveland, Los Angeles, New York City, San Francisco, and Seattle	2016	Indecline	
	Trump Buddha	China	2021	Hong Jinshi	
	God Emperor Trump	Viareggio, Italy	2019	Fabrizio Galli	
	In Honor of a Lifetime of Sexual Assault	Portland, Oregon; Philadelphia, Pennsylvania	2024	anonymous	
	Best Friends Forever	National Mall, Washington D.C.	2025	The Secret Handshake	
	King of the World (sculpture)	National Mall, Washington D.C.	2026	The Secret Handshake	
	Trump Statue Initiative				
	The Donald J. Trump Enduring Flame				
	Crooked and Obscene				

== Joe Biden ==
Image	Statue name	Location	Date	Sculptor	Source
	Joe Biden	Macabebe Municipal Hall, Macabebe, Philippines	2021		

== See also ==
- Mount Rushmore
- Presidential memorials in the United States
- List of Confederate monuments and memorials
