= Chas Fagan =

American artist and sculptor

- Born: Charles A. Fagan; 1966 (age 59–60); Ligonier, Pennsylvania
- Education: Yale University
- Known for: Oil Painting, Sculpture
- Notable work: Portraits, sculptures, political cartoons
- Website: https://www.chasfagan.com/

Charles A. Fagan (born 1966), better known as Chas Fagan, is an American artist and sculptor. He is known for painting oil portraits of all 45 U.S. Presidents (as of 2016), on commission from C-SPAN and the White House Historical Association. He also painted the official canonization image of Mother Teresa on commission from the Knights of Columbus, basing his work on a photograph by Michael Collopy. His other works include portraits, landscapes and still life, along with sculptures related to American historical figures. His work was featured in the American Presidents: Life Portraits exhibition in 1999, and in other venues.

== Biography ==
Chas Fagan was born in Ligonier, Pennsylvania in 1966. He spent much of his early life in Belgium with his father, who worked as a diplomat. He graduated Yale University with a degree in Russian and East European Studies. His earliest artistic works were political cartoons in a variety of publications. His career as a painter took off after his portrait of Ronald Reagan appeared on the cover of the conservative publication The Weekly Standard.

In December, 2014 Fagan created a statue depicting King Hagler meeting Thomas Spratt, one of the first European settlers in Charlotte, North Carolina.

Fagan produced a monument of Captain James Jack and horse, who rode the Mecklenburg County, North Carolina, Declaration of Independence in June 1775 to the Continental Congress in Philadelphia. Dedication of the monument called "The Spirit of Mecklenburg" was made with full colonial set and re-enactors on the 235th anniversary of the famous ride and took place nationally on "Good Morning, America" hosted by Cokie Roberts. His bronze sculpture of Reagan received criticism from KCRW journalist Edward Goldman for its:

stiff pose and bland facial expression echoing thousands of similarly banal portraits.... With the art of portraiture out of fashion in the leading American art schools, the statue was commissioned from a second-rate, self-taught artist who only excels at the art of pleasing his less than demanding clientele.

He was appointed to the Commission of Fine Arts by President Donald Trump, and replaced by Joe Biden.

== Notable works ==
- Lyndon B. Johnson (1995), Little Tranquility Park, Houston, Texas
- Official White House portrait of Barbara Bush (2005)
- Neil Armstrong (2007), Purdue University, West Lafayette, Indiana
- Statue of Ronald Reagan (2009), National Statuary Hall Collection, Washington, D.C.
  - Ronald Reagan Statue, London
  - Ronald Reagan Statue, Berlin
- George H. W. Bush Monument (2004), Sesquicentennial Park, Houston, Texas
  - George H. W. Bush statue, Berlin
- Statue of Billy Graham (2024), National Statuary Hall Collection, Washington, D.C.
