= Official White House portraits of Barbara and George H. W. Bush =

Paintings by Herbert Abrams and Chas Fagan

Portraits of the former president of the United States George H. W. Bush and first lady Barbara Bush were painted by the American portrait artist Herbert Abrams in 1994. The paintings were unveiled in 1995 in a ceremony at the White House. A second portrait was later commissioned for Barbara Bush who did not like Abrams's painting. Painted by Chas Fagan in 2005, it was deemed more successful and currently hangs in the White House.

== Abrams portraits ==
Barbara Bush, 1994

George H. W. Bush, 1994

Official White House portraits by Herbert Abrams

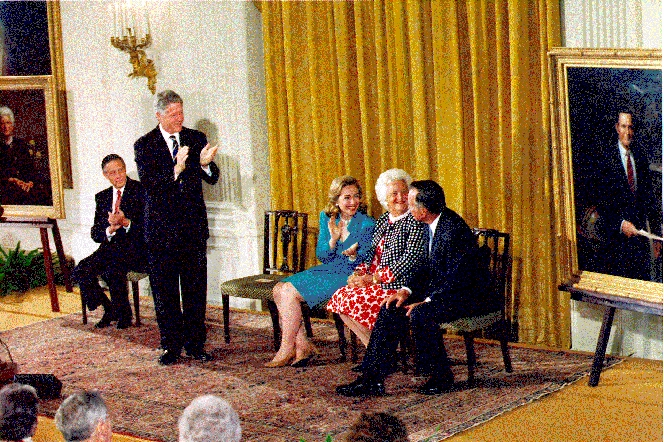
Barbara and George H. W. Bush at the unveiling of the portraits with President Bill Clinton and Hillary Clinton in 1995

The portraits were commissioned by the White House Historical Association and painted by the American artist Herbert Abrams. Abrams' previous works included the official White House portrait of former president Jimmy Carter. The cost for producing the paintings was paid through donations made to the White House Preservation Fund. The couple sat for the portraits after Bush's term as president came to an end. The unveiling of the portraits took place on July 17, 1995, during an official ceremony in the East Room of the White House in the presence of the Bushes and President Bill Clinton and First Lady Hillary Clinton. Among the gusts present at the ceremony were former vice president Dan Quayle and his wife Marilyn. In his remarks at the unveiling ceremony, President Clinton described the choice of Abrams as the portrait artist by the Bushes as "another outstanding example of bipartisanship" considering his previous work on Jimmy Carter's official portrait. Both portraits were described as gifts of Robert E. Krueger and Elizabeth W. Kreuger.

The painting of President Bush measures 50 1/4 in × 40 1/8 in (1,280 mm × 1,020 mm), while the one for Mrs Bush measures 38 in × 31 7/8 in (970 mm × 810 mm).

== Fagan portrait of Barbara Bush ==
Barbara Bush, 2005

Official White House portrait by Chas Fagan

Chas Fagan was commissioned to paint the second official portrait of Barbara Bush as she did not like the first portrait completed by Abrams. It measures 38 in × 31 11/6 in (970 mm × 830 mm). Depicted in the portrait alongside Bush is the family's English Springer Spaniel Millie. The painting is described as a gift of Britt and Kaye Rice.

Ahead of the centennial anniversary of her birthday, a commemorative Forever stamp featuring Fagan's portrait of Bush was unveiled on May 8, 2025, in the East Room of the White House in a ceremony hosted by First Lady Melania Trump and attended by two of her children, Dorothy Bush Koch and Neil Bush.

== See also ==
- Art in the White House
- Portraits of presidents of the United States
