= Statue of Woodrow Wilson (Austin, Texas) =

Statue by Pompeo Coppini in Texas, U.S.

- Artist: Pompeo Coppini
- Year: 1933
- Medium: Bronze sculpture
- Subject: Woodrow Wilson
- Location: Austin, Texas, United States
- Owner: University of Texas at Austin

Woodrow Wilson is a sculpture depicting the American president of the same name by Pompeo Coppini. The sculpture was commissioned in 1919 by George W. Littlefield to be included in the Littlefield Fountain on the campus of the University of Texas at Austin. It was installed on the university's South Mall in Austin, Texas from 1933 until its removal in 2015.

== History ==
In 1919, University of Texas regent George W. Littlefield donated funds to pay for the construction of a "Memorial Gateway" at the south entrance to the university's campus that would honor the Confederate dead from the Civil War. He hired San Antonio-based Italian-born sculptor Pompeo Coppini to design the monument, which was to include a number of statues of notable figures from the history of Texas and the American South. The memorial was ultimately redesigned as the Littlefield Fountain and instead dedicated to the university's students and alumni who had died in the Great War (now known as World War I).

As part of the memorial project, in the 1920s Coppini sculpted bronze statues of Woodrow Wilson and five Texan and Confederate notables selected by Littlefield, which he intended to display around the fountain. However, as construction on the memorial proceeded in the early 1930s, campus architect Paul Cret decided to instead install the six statues along the university's South Mall, where they were placed in 1933 as the construction of the fountain complex was completed.

=== Controversy, removal, and relocation ===
Beginning in 2015 and accelerating in 2017, a national controversy grew over the prominent positions of monuments and memorials to the Confederacy in many public spaces across the United States, and particularly in the American South. In this context, the statues of Confederate notables along the university's South Mall that Coppini had designed for the Littlefield Fountain attracted increased public criticism.

In March 2015, UT's student government passed a resolution calling for the removal of Coppini's statue of Jefferson Davis from the South Mall. That August, the university in fact removed the statues of both Davis and Wilson from the Mall and placed them in storage, despite a lawsuit from the Texas Division of the Sons of Confederate Veterans, which failed to persuade the Texas Supreme Court to block the plan.

In August 2015, UT President Gregory L. Fenves announced that the statue of Woodrow Wilson will be reinstalled at a location on campus, which has yet to be determined. Fenves said the statue was originally removed to maintain symmetry on the mall along with the Davis statue's removal.

== See also ==
- List of memorials to Woodrow Wilson
- List of sculptures of presidents of the United States
- Woodrow Wilson Monument, Prague
