= George H. W. Bush Monument =

Sculpture in Houston, Texas, U.S.

- 29°45′54.1″N 95°21′57.7″W
- Location: Houston, Texas, U.S.

The George H. W. Bush Monument, also known as the President Bush Monument, is an 8-foot (2.4 m) bronze statue of George H. W. Bush in Houston's Sesquicentennial Park, in the U.S. state of Texas.

The monument was designed by Chas Fagan. The wider project included a plaza and a wall with four reliefs depicting events of Bush's career, sculpted by Willy Wang. The privately funded project cost $1.7million and was led by David B. Jones and local immigration lawyer Charles Foster. It was unveiled in December 2004.

== See also ==
- List of public art in Houston
- List of sculptures of presidents of the United States
