= Woodrow Wilson Monument =

Sculpture in Prague, Czech Republic

- Pomník Woodrowa Wilsona (Czech)
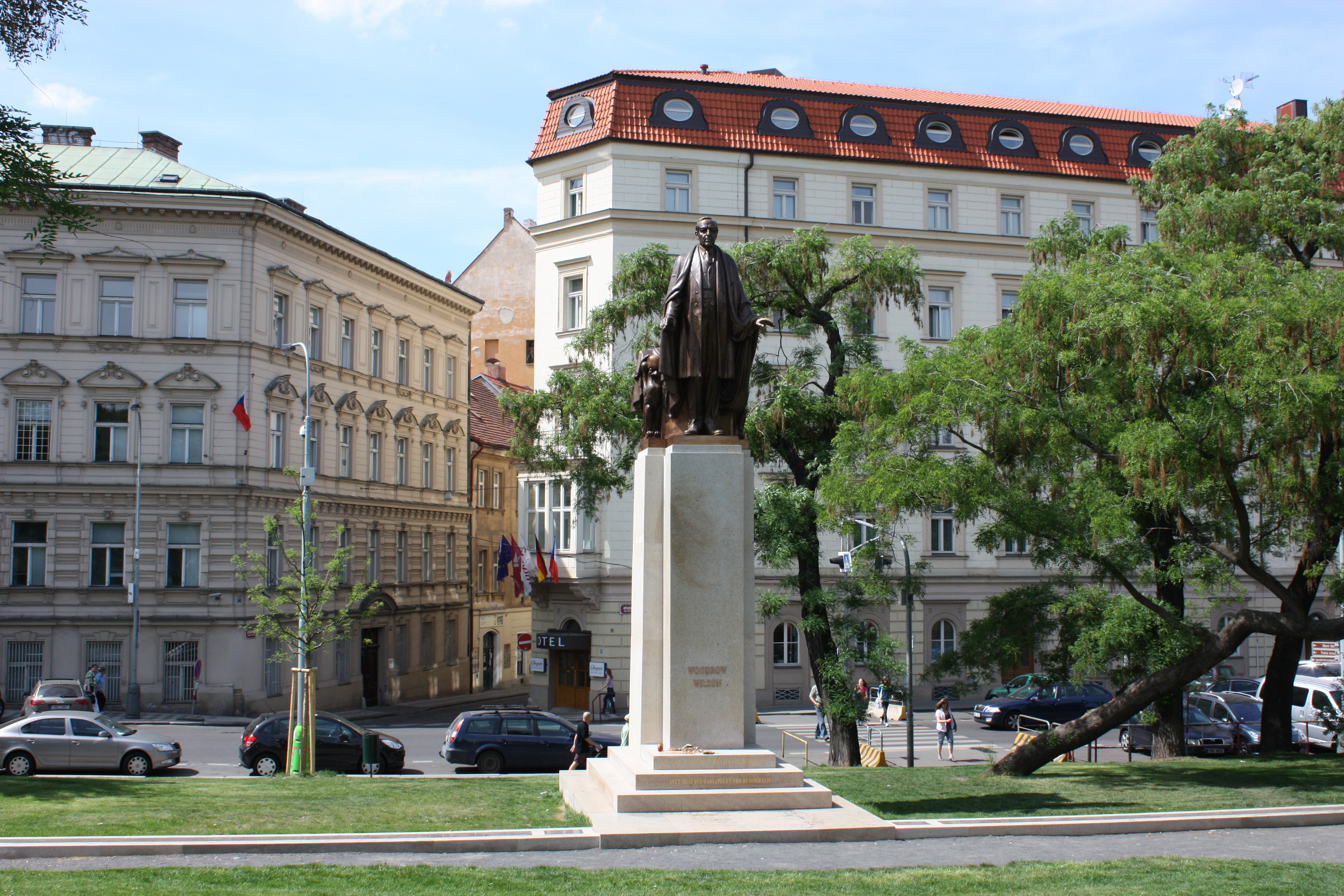
- The monument in 2012
- Artist: Albin Polasek
- Location: Prague, Czech Republic; 50°5′1.95″N 14°25′59.25″E

The Woodrow Wilson Monument (Czech: Pomník Woodrowa Wilsona), created by Czech-American sculptor Albin Polasek, is installed outside Praha hlavní nádraží in Prague, Czech Republic. It was unveiled in October 2011, and honors the 28th president of the United States, Woodrow Wilson. It was erected to honor the role that Wilson had in Czech independence after World War I.

== See also ==
- List of memorials to Woodrow Wilson
- List of sculptures of presidents of the United States
- Statue of Woodrow Wilson (Austin, Texas), formerly installed at the University of Texas at Austin
