= List of memorials to Woodrow Wilson =

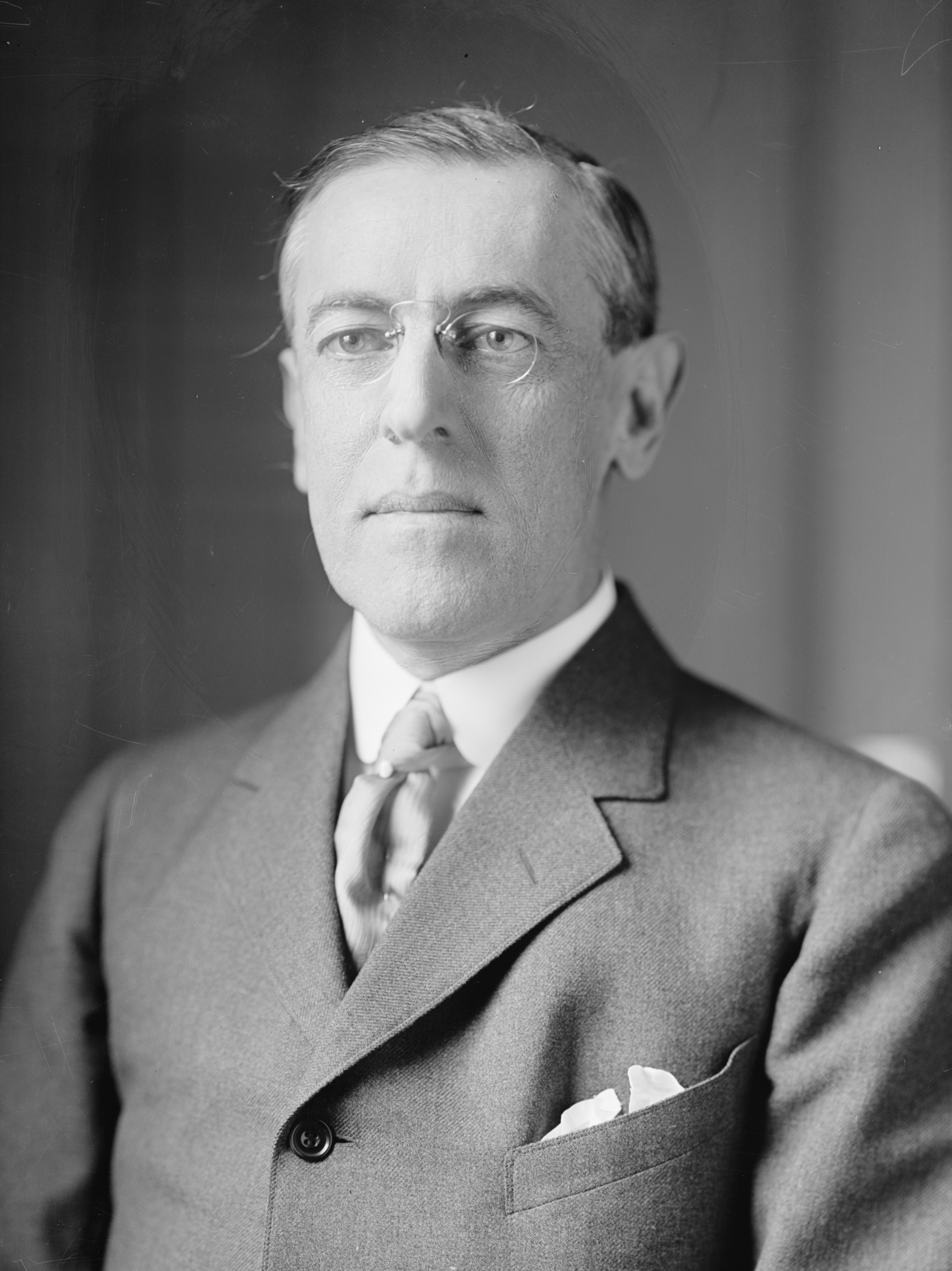
Wilson in 1914

Numerous objects are named after Woodrow Wilson, the 28th president of the United States. This includes schools, including several high schools; several streets; USS Woodrow Wilson, a Lafayette-class submarine; the Woodrow Wilson Bridge between Prince George's County, Maryland and Virginia; and the Palais Wilson, temporary headquarters of the Office of the United Nations High Commissioner for Human Rights. Monuments to Wilson include the Woodrow Wilson Monument in Prague.

== Academic buildings ==
- Wilson House, an undergraduate dormitory at Johns Hopkins University, is named in his honor.
- Wilson Hall, an administrative building at James Madison University, is named in his honor.
- Woodrow Wilson Hall at Monmouth University

== Educational institutions ==
- Baker Montessori School (formerly Woodrow Wilson Montessori School and Woodrow Wilson Elementary School), renamed in 2021
- Castor Gardens Middle School, named Woodrow Wilson Middle School until 2022
- First College, a residential college of Princeton University, named Woodrow Wilson College from 1966 to 2020
- Princeton School of Public and International Affairs, named Woodrow Wilson School of Public and International Affairs from 1948 to 2020
- Wilson Workforce and Rehabilitation Center, a vocational school for disabled individuals located in Fishersville, Virginia
- Woodrow Wilson High School (over 10 current and former locations)

== Statues ==
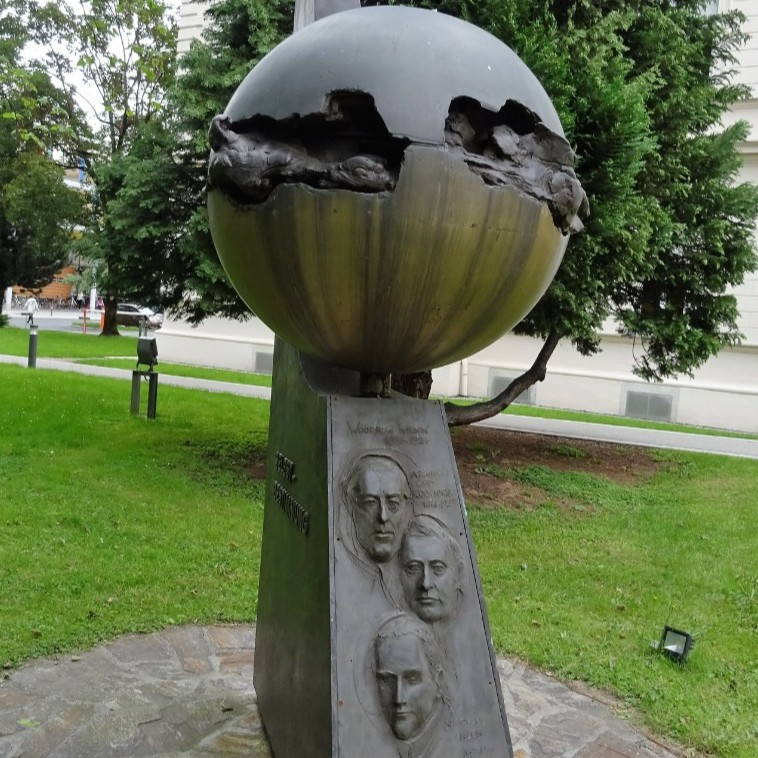
Woodrow Wilson Delegation Monument Klagenfurt, Austria. It shows a Bronze Globe, and under it the faces and names of Woodrow Wilson, and the two delegates Archibald Coolidge and Sherman Miles.

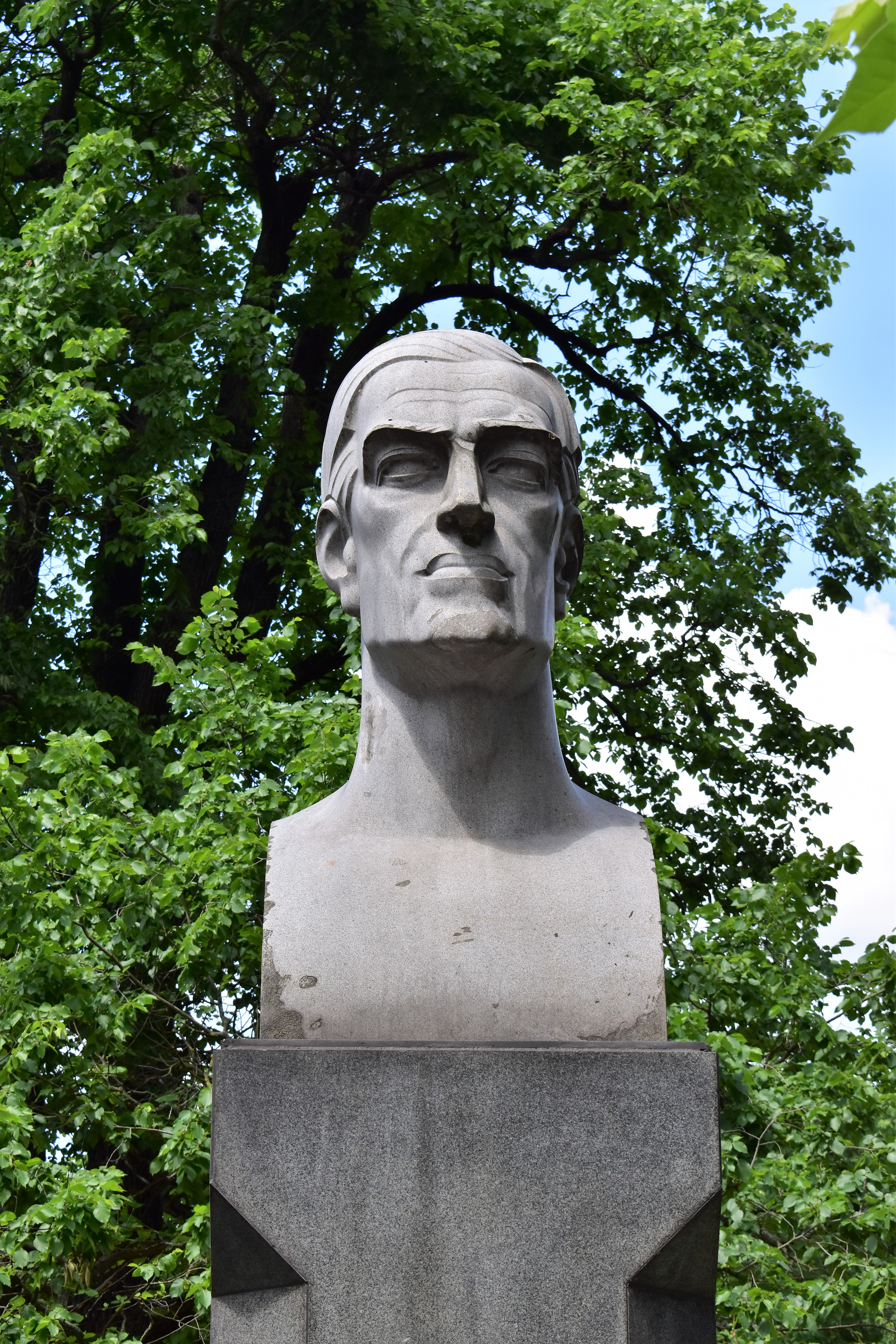
Woodrow Wilson bust Poznań, Poland. It was rebuilt in 1994

- Woodrow Wilson Monument in Prague, Czech Republic, for the role that Wilson had in Czech independence his rightness stand for the creation of the Czech state.
- Woodrow Wilson Statue, Wilson Park in Poznań, Poland, for his stance for the creation of the Poland state. It was remade in 1994 after the original statue was destroyed in WW2.
- Statue of Woodrow Wilson (Austin, Texas) (removed in 2015).
- Bust of Woodrow Wilson in Sofia, Bulgaria for his stance for the Bulgarian nation.
- Monument of Woodrow Wilson delegation in Klagenfurt, Austria, for his stance for the Austrian nation.
- Bust of Woodrow Wilson in Bratislava, Slovakia.
- Bust of Woodrow Wilson in Cluj-Napoca, Romania.

== Military vessels ==
- USS Woodrow Wilson (SSBN-624), a Lafayette-class ballistic missile submarine

== Transportation ==
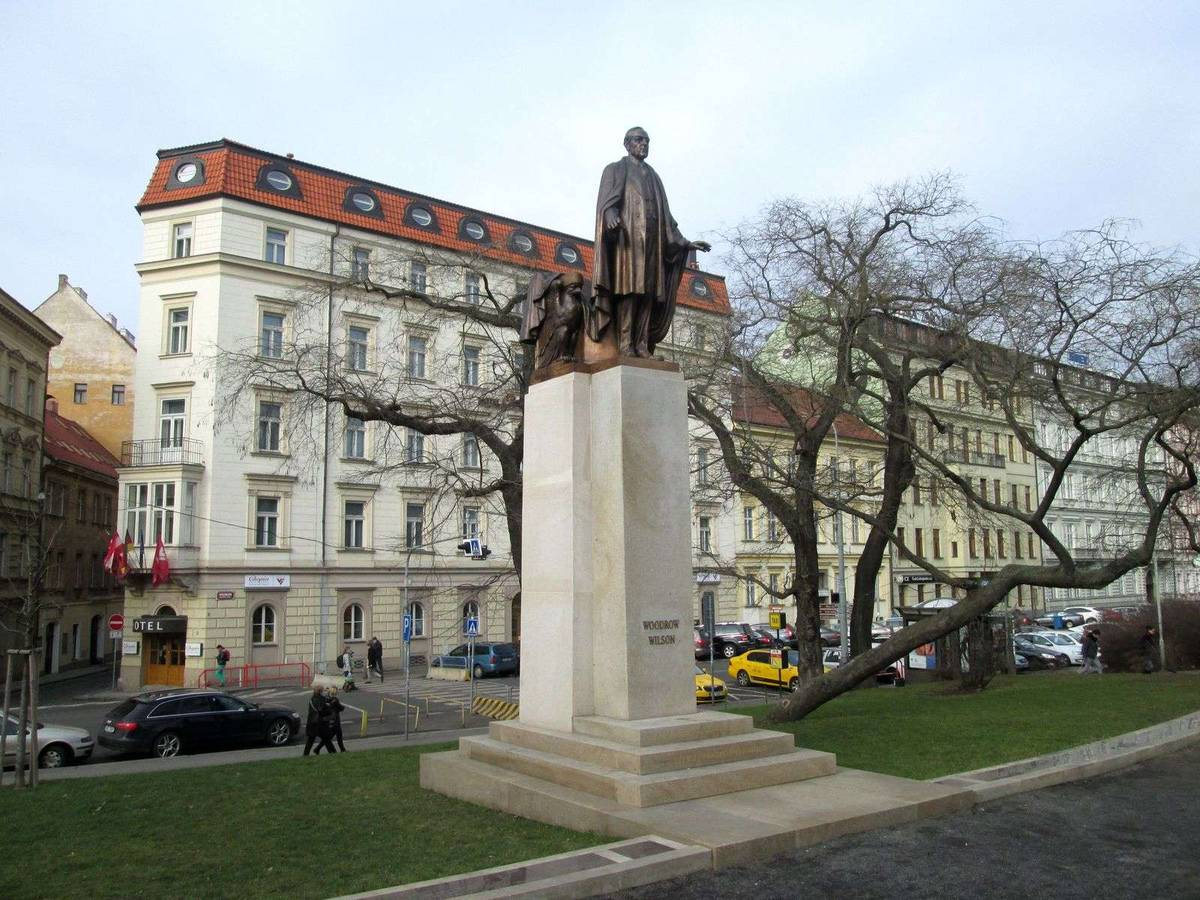
Woodrow Wilson statue, on "Wilsonova ulice" (Wilson street) in Prague, Czechia

- The Avenue du Président-Wilson in Paris, France
- Boulevard Wilson, a main street in Strasbourg, France
- Avenue du Président Wilson in Calais, France
- Wilson Street (Wilsonova Ulice), in Prague, Czech Republic
- Wilson Street (улица Удроу Уилсън) in Plovdiv, Bulgaria
- Wilson Street (Wilsonstraße), street in Hamburg, Germany
- Avenida Presidente Wilson in São Paulo, Brazil
- "Wilson Bridge" (Wilsonův most), bridge across the Radbuza in Plzeň
- Wilson's Promenade, the most popular walking avenue in Sarajevo, Bosnia and Herzegovina
- Woodrow Wilson Avenue, a main street in Jackson, Mississippi
- Woodrow Wilson Bridge across the Potomac River
- Woodrow Wilsonplein, a square in Ghent, Belgium
- In recognition of his signing on March 2, 1917 the "Jones Act" that granted United States citizenship to Puerto Ricans, streets in several Puerto Rican municipalities were renamed "Calle Wilson", including one in the Mariani neighborhood in Ponce and the Condado section of San Juan.
- Woodrow Wilson Boulevard, located in the Belgrade Waterfront, Serbia

== Other ==
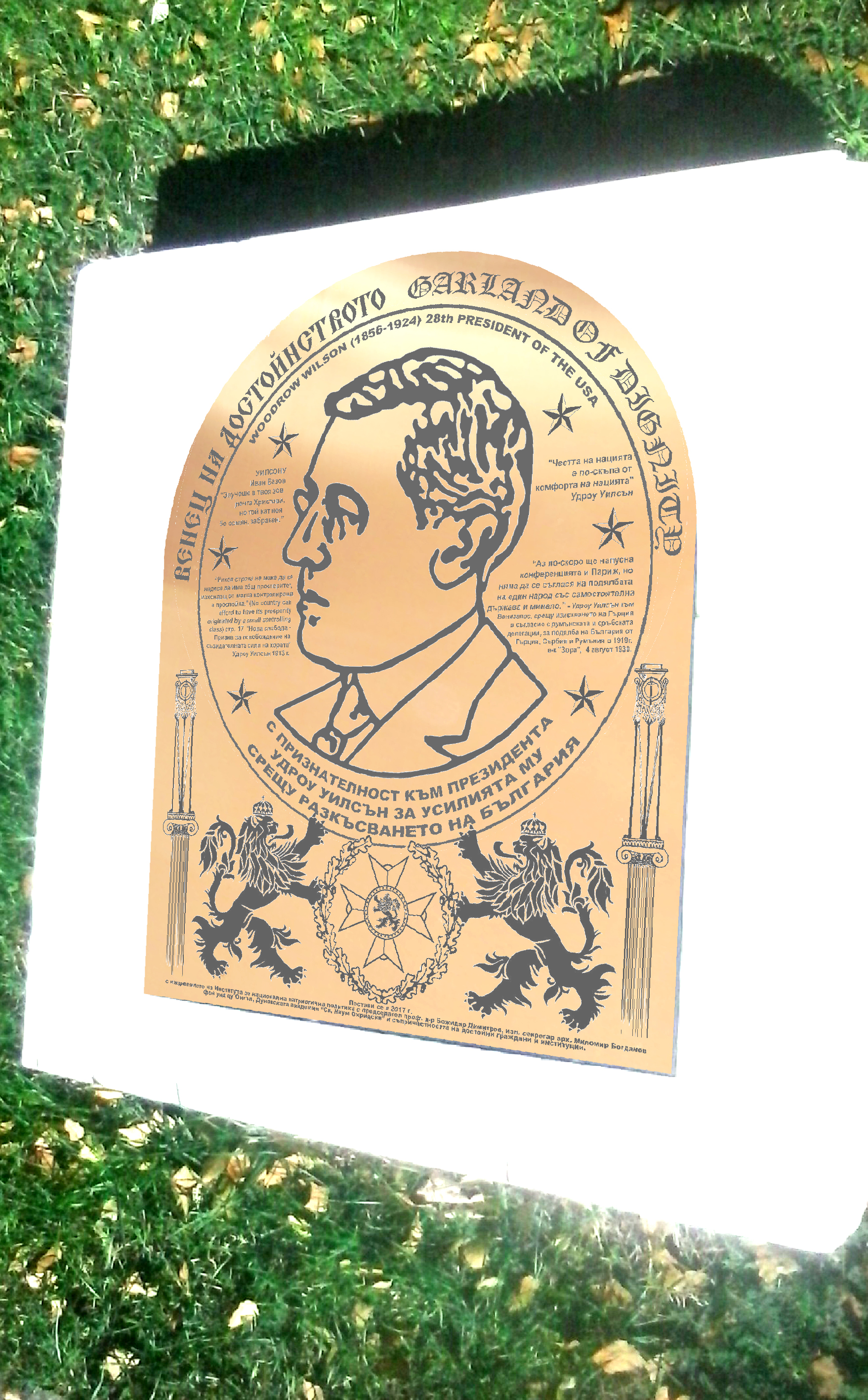
US President Woodrow Wilson memorial Plaque in Sofia open in Bulgaria National Museum at 4 March 2017, erected by Bojhidar Dimitrov and architect Mylomyr Bogdanov

- The Hotel President Wilson, in Geneva, Switzerland
- The Palais Wilson in Geneva is the current headquarters of the Office of the United Nations High Commissioner for Human Rights; the Quai Wilson is a street nearby, on the west shore of Lake Geneva.
- Plac Wilsona, a square in northwestern Warsaw
- Park Wilsona, city park in Poznań
- Woodrow Wilson Boyhood Home
- Woodrow Wilson House
- Woodrow Wilson Presidential Library
- Woodrow Wilson International Center for Scholars, part of the Smithsonian Institution
- Woodrow Wilson Pub in Carlisle, England, named after the president due to his ancestral link to the city. His mother, Janet was born in Carlisle in 1826. He visited Carlisle in 1918 on a "pilgrimage of the heart".
- Woodrow Wilson Service Area- New Jersey Turnpike rest stop located in Hamilton Township, New Jersey
- The "Président Wilson" is a rowing rescue boat, built in 1918, belonging to the life guard in Lutry, Switzerland.
- Woodrow Wilsonplein, a public square in Ghent, Belgium named after Woodrow Wilson

== See also ==
- Presidential memorials in the United States
