= Statue of Dwight D. Eisenhower (U.S. Capitol) =

Sculpture by Jim Brothers

Dwight D. Eisenhower
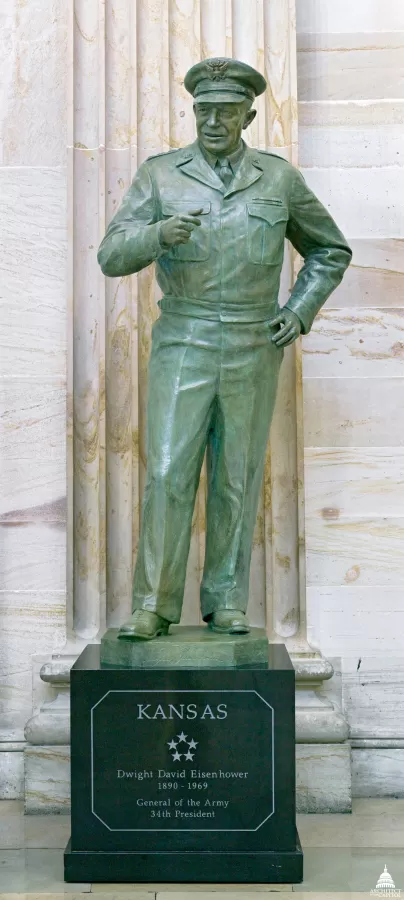
- Artist: Jim Brothers
- Medium: Bronze sculpture
- Subject: Dwight D. Eisenhower
- Location: Washington, D.C., United States

Dwight D. Eisenhower is a bronze sculpture depicting the former U.S. president of the same name by Jim Brothers, installed in the U.S. Capitol's rotunda, in Washington, D.C., as part of the National Statuary Hall Collection. The statue was gifted by the U.S. state of Kansas in 2003, and replaced one depicting George Washington Glick.

== See also ==
- 2003 in art
- List of memorials to Dwight D. Eisenhower
- List of sculptures of presidents of the United States
