= Bust of John F. Kennedy (Nashua, New Hampshire) =

Sculpture by Evangelos Frudakis

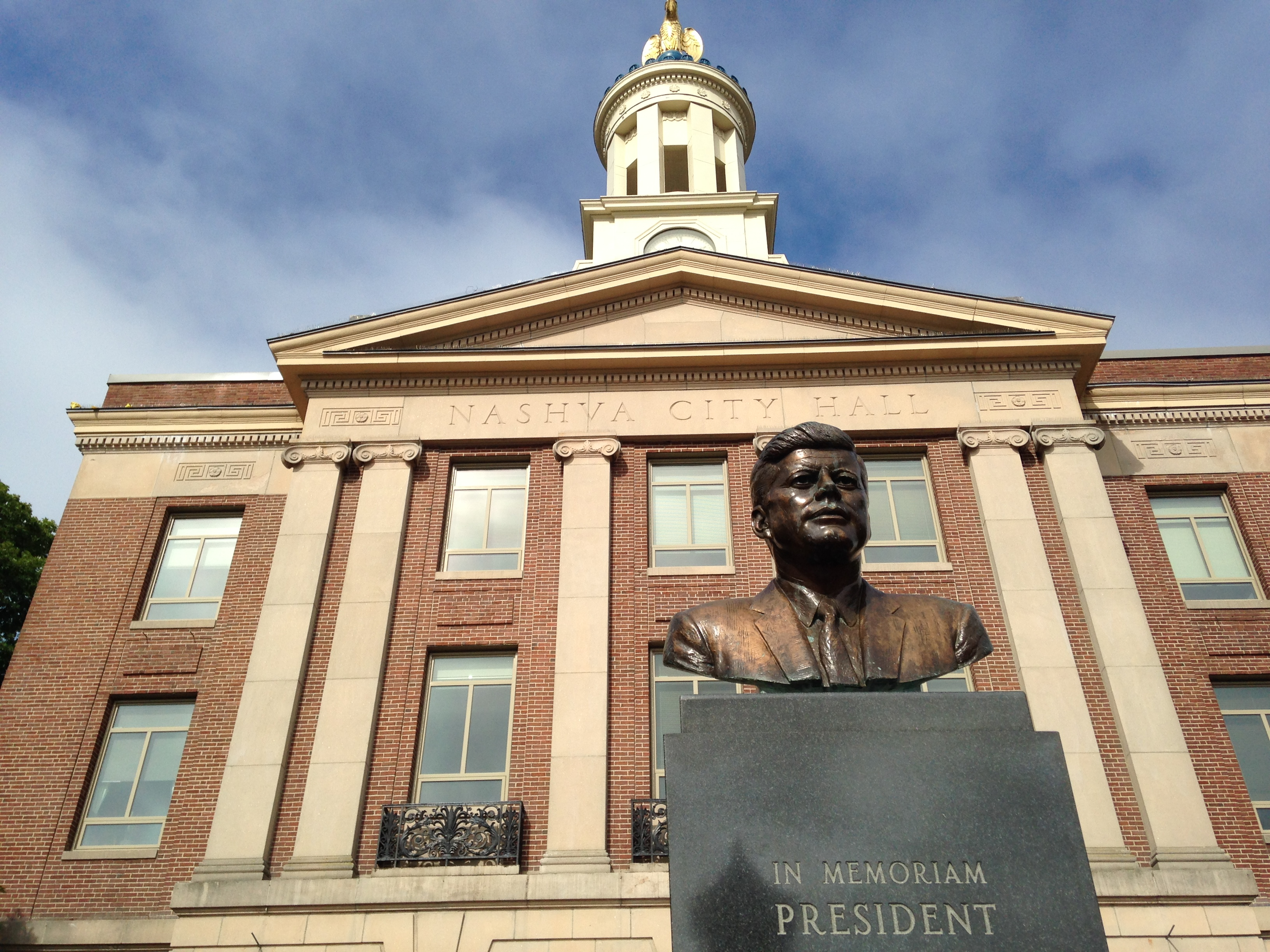
- The sculpture in 2015
- Artist: Evangelos Frudakis
- Year: 1965
- Medium: Bronze, granite
- Subject: John F. Kennedy
- Location: Nashua City Hall, Nashua, New Hampshire, United States

John F. Kennedy is a 1965 bust of John F. Kennedy, sculpted by Evangelos William Frudakis. It is located on the south side of the city hall plaza in Nashua, New Hampshire, and commemorates Kennedy inaugurating his 1960 presidential campaign in Nashua.

== Design ==
The bust is made of bronze supported on a black granite base. The bust and base are bordered by a black metal fence surrounding flower plantings. The bust has the following inscriptions on its base:

=== Front ===
IN MEMORIAM PRESIDENT JOHN FITZGERALD KENNEDY ON JANUARY 25th, 1960 THIS CITY HALL PLAZA WAS JOHN F. KENNEDY'S FIRST CAMPAIGN STOP IN THE NATION FOR THE PRESIDENCY OF THE UNITED STATES OF AMERICA.

=== Rear ===
LET THE WORD GO FORTH FROM THIS TIME AND PLACE, TO FRIEND AND FOE ALIKE, THAT THE TORCH HAS BEEN PASSED TO A NEW GENERATION OF AMERICANS--BORN IN THIS CENTURY, TEMPERED BY WAR, DISCIPLINED BY A HARD AND BITTER PEACE, PROUD OF OUR ANCIENT HERITAGE.

JOHN F. KENNEDY JANUARY 20, 1961

PUBLIC CONTRIBUTIONS MISS CECELIA WINN MAYOR MARIO J. VAGGE/ CHR.

=== Right ===
ERECTED 1965

== History ==
The bust, created by the sculptor Evangelos William Frudakis, was financed by the Kennedy Memorial Drive Committee chaired by Cecelia Winn and Nashua Mayor Mario Vagge. It was officially unveiled at Nashua's Veterans Day parade on November 11, 1965. The bust was initially situated in the center of Nashua's City Hall Plaza, facing eastward overlooking Main Street. In 2015, following an expansion of the City Hall Plaza, the bust was moved to the south side and now faces north. In November of 1996, the bust was stolen by Wayne Heinemann, William Moore, and Raymond Descoteaux and recovered by the Nashua police a few days later.

== See also ==
- Cultural depictions of John F. Kennedy
- List of things named after John F. Kennedy
- List of sculptures of presidents of the United States
