= Presidents North Carolina Gave the Nation =

Monument in Raleigh, North Carolina, United States

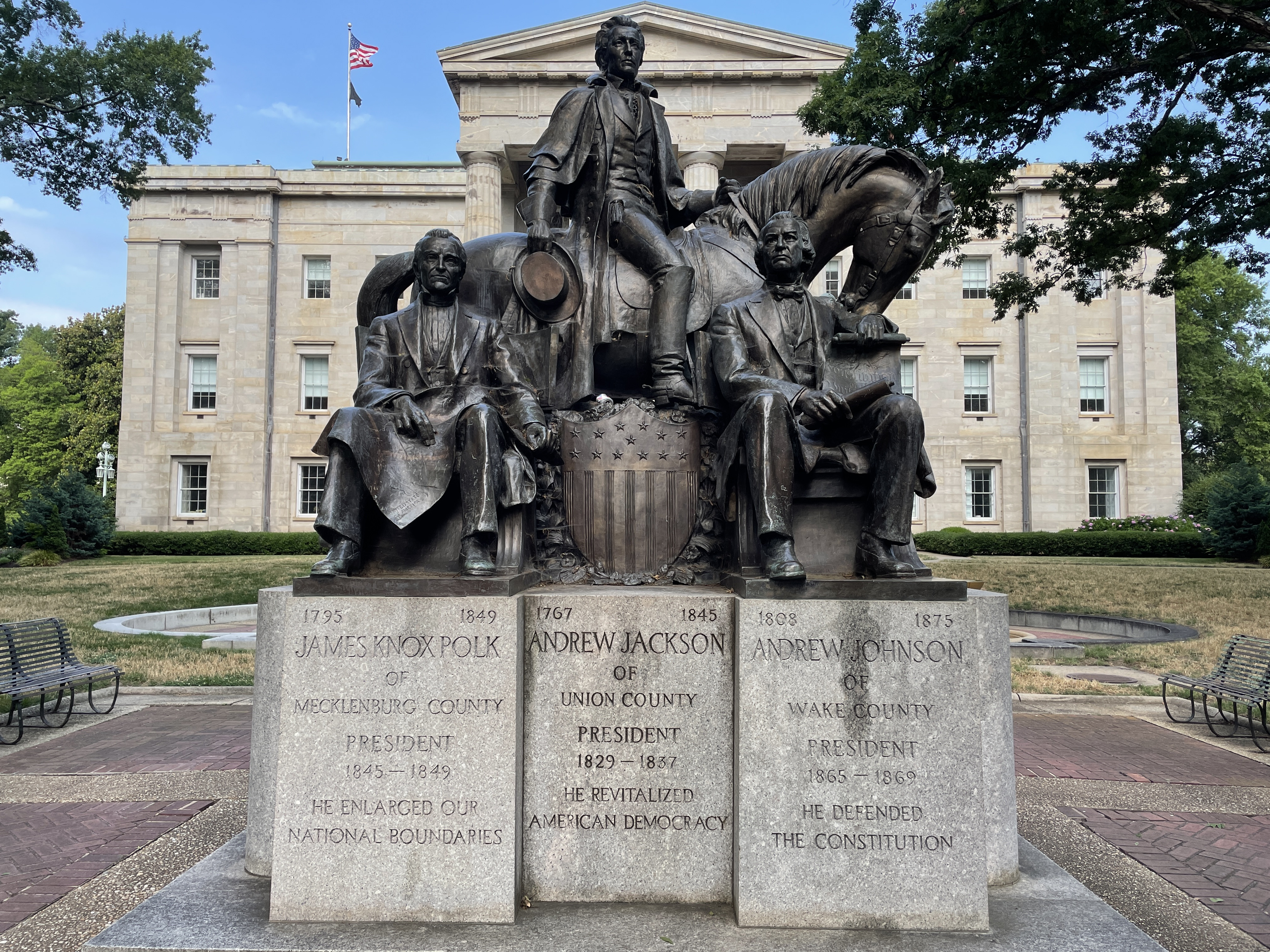
- The monument in 2022, with the North Carolina State Capitol in the background
- Interactive map of Presidents North Carolina Gave the Nation
- Location: North Carolina State Capitol, Raleigh, North Carolina, United States
- Coordinates: 35.780370°N 78.638530°W
- Designer: Charles Keck
- Fabricator: Gorham Manufacturing Company (statue); Benisch Brothers (base)
- Type: Statue
- Material: Bronze (statue); Granite (base)
- Dedicated date: October 19, 1948
- Dedicated to: Andrew Jackson, Andrew Johnson, and James K. Polk

Presidents North Carolina Gave the Nation (also known as Three Presidents) is a monument located on the grounds of the North Carolina State Capitol in Raleigh, North Carolina, United States. Designed by sculptor Charles Keck, it is dedicated to and depicts the three presidents of the United States who were born in North Carolina—Andrew Jackson, (Note: Andrew Jackson was born in the Waxhaws area near the border between North Carolina and South Carolina. The exact location of his birthplace is not known, and as a result, there is some uncertainty as to whether or not he was actually born in North Carolina. However, many of Jackson's relatives were from North Carolina, and he was largely raised there.) Andrew Johnson, and James K. Polk. It was dedicated on October 19, 1948, in a ceremony where President Harry S. Truman gave the main address.

== Design ==
The monument, which is also commonly called Three Presidents, consists of a bronze sculpture depicting Andrew Jackson, Andrew Johnson, and James K. Polk, atop a granite base. Both Johnson and Polk are depicted in a seated position, while Jackson is on horseback. Johnson holds a copy of the Constitution of the United States while Polk holds a map. Two mortars that were previously mounted at Fort Macon are displayed near the monument. It is located on Union Square, which surrounds the North Carolina State Capitol.

== History ==
=== Creation ===
The idea of erecting a statue on the capitol grounds in honor of the three presidents of the United States who had been born in North Carolina—Jackson, Johnson, and Polk—was initially proposed by A. J. Maxwell, who served as the commissioner of the North Carolina Department of Revenue. Maxwell discussed his proposal with several state legislators, who were receptive to the idea, and in February 1943, Lynton Y. Ballentine, Joe L. Blythe, and Coble Funderburk of the North Carolina Senate introduced a resolution that would allow the governor of North Carolina to create a commission to assess the proposed monument project. The North Carolina General Assembly approved this as a joint resolution the following month and, shortly thereafter, Governor J. Melville Broughton created a 9-member committee, with Josephus Daniels as chairman and Christopher Crittenden as secretary. The committee gave its approval to the proposal, and in March 1945, during the next meeting of the General Assembly, the legislature authorized the committee to proceed with its creation. Initial money for the project was allocated from the state's Contingency and Emergency Fund. The monument would be the first memorial for any of the three presidents erected in the state.

The commission reviewed design proposals from several sculptors but ultimately selected New York-based sculptor Charles Keck. The committee made several minor changes to his submission, but the design remained largely the same as what he had initially proposed. The bronze elements of the monument were cast by the Gorham Manufacturing Company in Providence, Rhode Island, while the stone base was created by the Benisch Brothers of Brooklyn. The project would be one of Keck's last as an artist.

=== Dedication ===
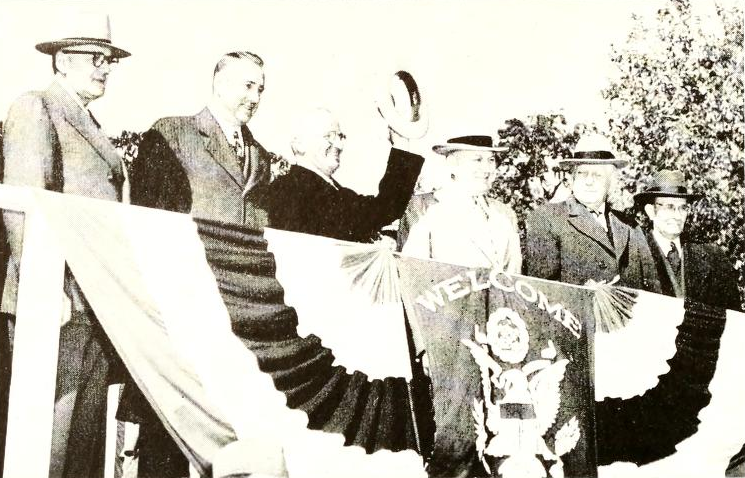
Several guests of honor at the dedication ceremony, with President Harry S. Truman third from left

The monument was dedicated on October 19, 1948. President Harry S. Truman, who was at the time campaigning for reelection in that year's presidential election, participated in the dedication ceremony. He arrived in Raleigh via plane the previous day with his wife, his daughter, and several members of his staff. He was met at the airport by Governor R. Gregg Cherry, several members of the monument commission, and other local politicians and members of the Democratic Party, who accompanied him on a motorcade through the city to the Sir Walter Hotel. The next day, Truman, Cherry, and others participated in a large parade that ran from the City Auditorium to the State Capitol.

Willis Smith, who had taken over as chairman of the monument committee following Daniels's death in January 1948, presided over the dedication ceremony. The ceremony opened with a playing of "The Star-Spangled Banner" by the 82nd Airborne Division Band of Fort Bragg, followed by an invocation from Broadus E. Jones, the pastor of Raleigh's First Baptist Church. Smith then presented the monument, which was unveiled by three distant relatives of the former presidents. Governor R. Gregg Cherry accepted the monument, following which Truman gave a speech, which served as the ceremony's main address. The band then played "The Stars and Stripes Forever" to close the event. While not initially on the schedule of events, Tennessee Governor Jim Nance McCord, who was present as a guest of honor, was invited by Smith to make a brief speech. Other notable individuals who participated in the dedication ceremony included Secretary of the Army Kenneth Claiborne Royall and Senators Clyde R. Hoey and William B. Umstead.

Following the dedication ceremony, Truman also gave another address in Raleigh to mark the opening of the annual North Carolina State Fair. Additionally, a banquet for the president and other guests of honor was held at the North Carolina Executive Mansion, with smaller receptions held throughout Raleigh.

=== Later history ===
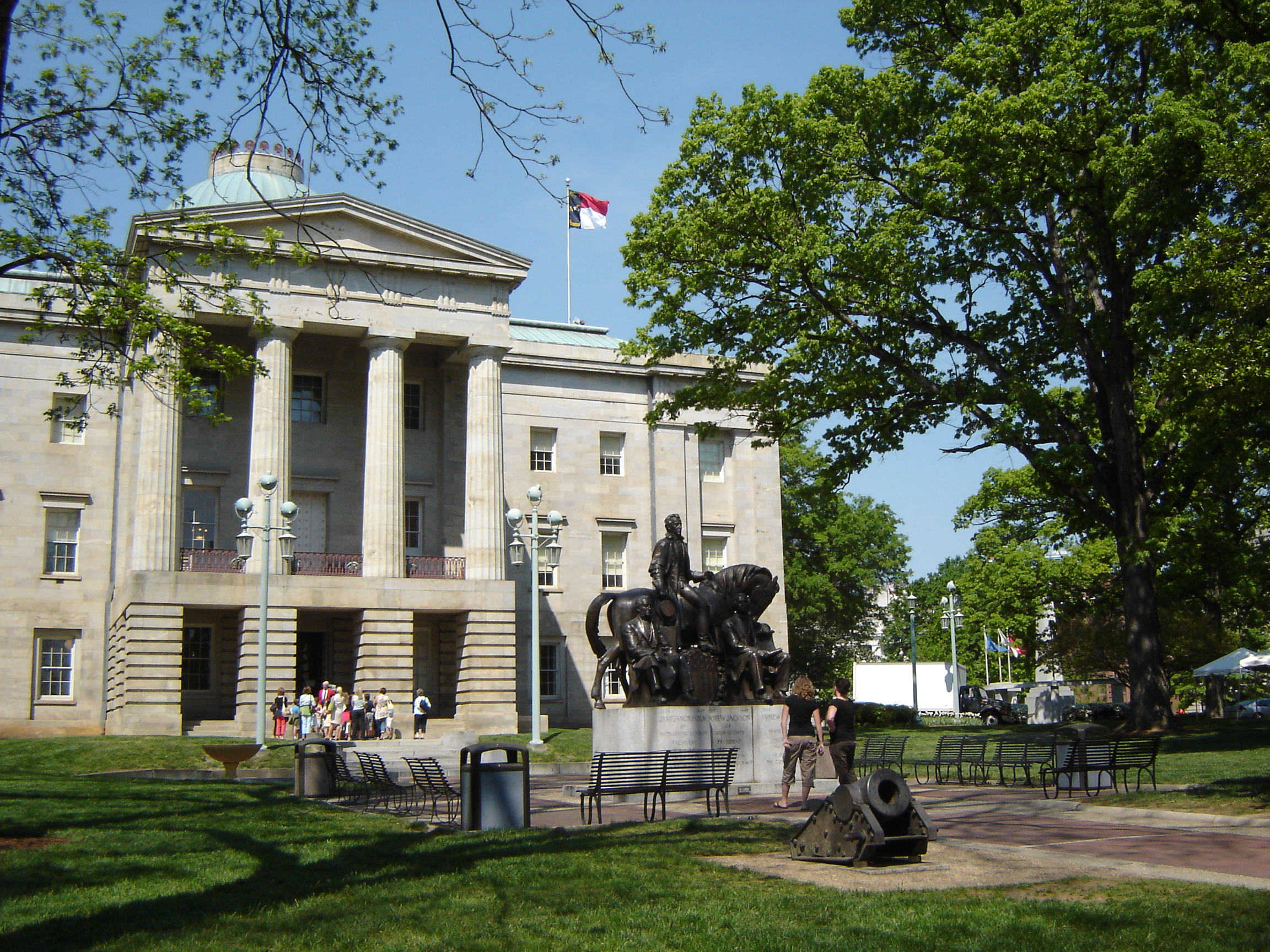
The monument and surrounding area in 2010

In 1997, the monument, as well as six others on the capitol grounds, underwent a restoration which included a cleaning and the replacement of its existing wax coating.

== See also ==
- List of equestrian statues in the United States
- List of memorials to Andrew Jackson
- List of memorials to James K. Polk
- List of sculptures of presidents of the United States
- Presidential memorials in the United States

== Sources ==
- Presidents North Carolina Gave the Nation: Addresses and Papers in Connection with the Unveiling of a Monument to the Three Presidents North Carolina Gave the Nation. Commission for a Memorial to the Three North Carolina Presidents. Raleigh, North Carolina: The Graphic Press. 1949. OCLC 978127494.
