= List of memorials to Dwight D. Eisenhower =

This is a list of places in the United States named for Dwight D. Eisenhower, the 34th president of the United States:

== Education ==
Colleges and universities named after Dwight D. Eisenhower

- Eisenhower College in Seneca Falls, New York, 1965–1983

== Highways ==
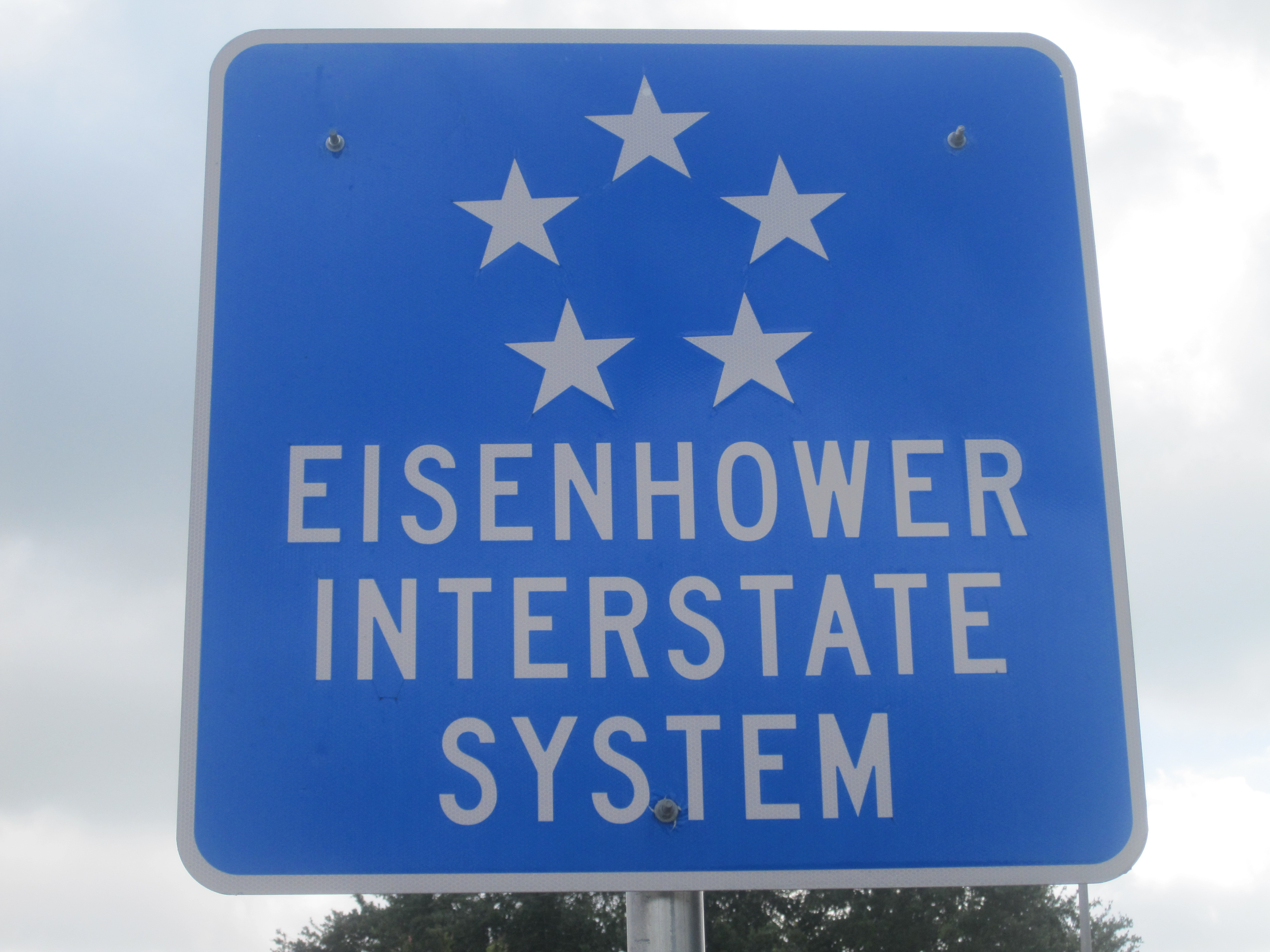
Eisenhower Interstate System sign south of San Antonio, Texas

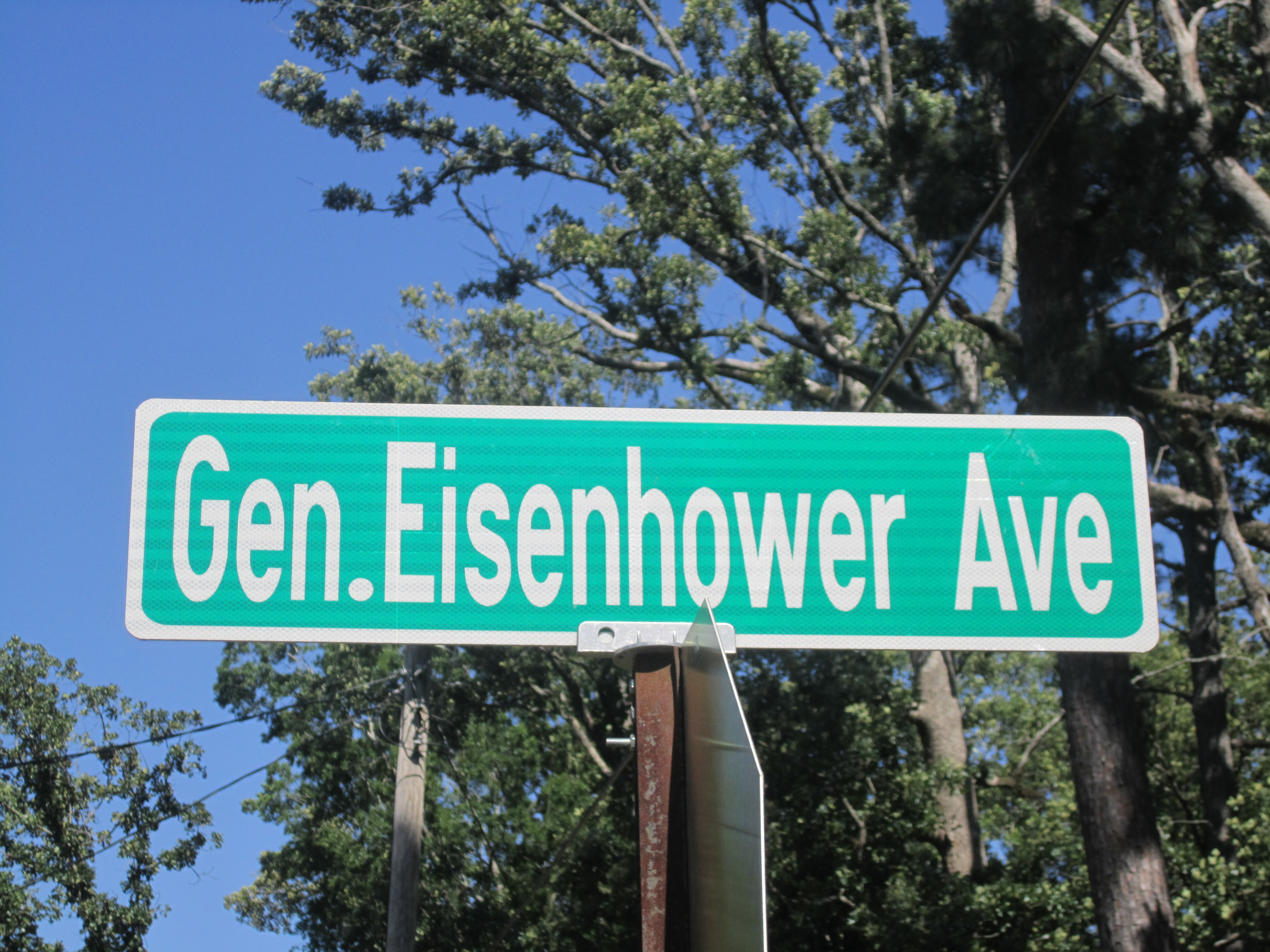
Many streets across the United States are named for Eisenhower, including this residential avenue in Shreveport, Louisiana

- Dwight D. Eisenhower System of Interstate and Defence Highways
- Eisenhower Parkway in Essex County, New Jersey
- Eisenhower Expressway (Interstate 290) near Chicago
- Eisenhower Tunnel on Interstate 70 west of Denver

== Media and cultural depictions ==
- Pressure a centered on General Eisenhower's decision as to when to successfully stage the Invasion of Normandy based storm patterns in the Atlantic.
- Eisenhower: This Piece of Ground a 2023 one-man play by Richard Hellesen portraying Eisenhower in retirement while working on his 2nd autobiography, discussing his achievements and musing on his impact.

== Military facilities ==
- Camp Eisenhower
- Chapel No. 1, the Eisenhower Memorial Chapel at the former Lowry Air Force Base in Denver, Colorado
- Dwight D. Eisenhower Army Medical Center, located at Fort Gordon near Augusta, Georgia
- Eisenhower Conference Centre, located at SHAPE (Supreme Headquarters Allied Powers Europe), Mons, Belgium
- Eisenhower Hall, the cadet activities building at West Point
- Eisenhower Monument at West Point
- Fort Eisenhower, renamed from Fort Gordon in 2023 upon recommendation of the Naming Commission and renamed back in 2025

== Parks ==
- Eisenhower State Park (Kansas)
- Eisenhower State Park (Texas)

== Sport ==
- The Eisenhower Tree at the Augusta National Golf Club
- The Eisenhower Golf Club at the United States Air Force Academy
- The 18th hole at Cherry Hills Country Club, near Denver

== Landforms ==
- Eisenhower Range in Victoria Land, Antarctica
- Mount Eisenhower in the Presidential Range of the White Mountains (New Hampshire)

== Military vessels ==
- USS Dwight D. Eisenhower, the second Nimitz-class supercarrier

== Railroads ==
- Dwight D. Eisenhower, a British LNER A4 class steam locomotive

== Other ==
- The Eisenhower Institute in Washington, D.C., a policy institute
- Dwight D. Eisenhower Memorial in Washington, D.C.
- Eisenhower Birthplace State Historic Site in Denison, Texas
- Eisenhower National Historic Site in Gettysburg, Pennsylvania
- Eisenhower Executive Office Building, part of the White House Complex
- The Eisenhower Medical Center in Rancho Mirage, California
- The Dwight D. Eisenhower National Fish Hatchery in Rutland County, Vermont
- Eisenhower Presidential Center, including the Eisenhower Presidential Library, in Abilene, Kansas
- Eisenhower Avenue (WMATA station), rapid transit station in Alexandria, Virginia
- Wichita Dwight D. Eisenhower National Airport, a commercial airport in Wichita, Kansas
- Dwight D. Eisenhower (Brothers), National Statuary Hall Collection
- The top floor of the Culzean Castle is named for Eisenhower

== See also ==
- Dwight D. Eisenhower#Tributes and memorials
- Presidential memorials in the United States
