= John F. Kennedy Memorial (Hyannis, Massachusetts) =

Monument in Hyannis, Massachusetts

Coordinates: 41°38′31″N 70°16′43″W

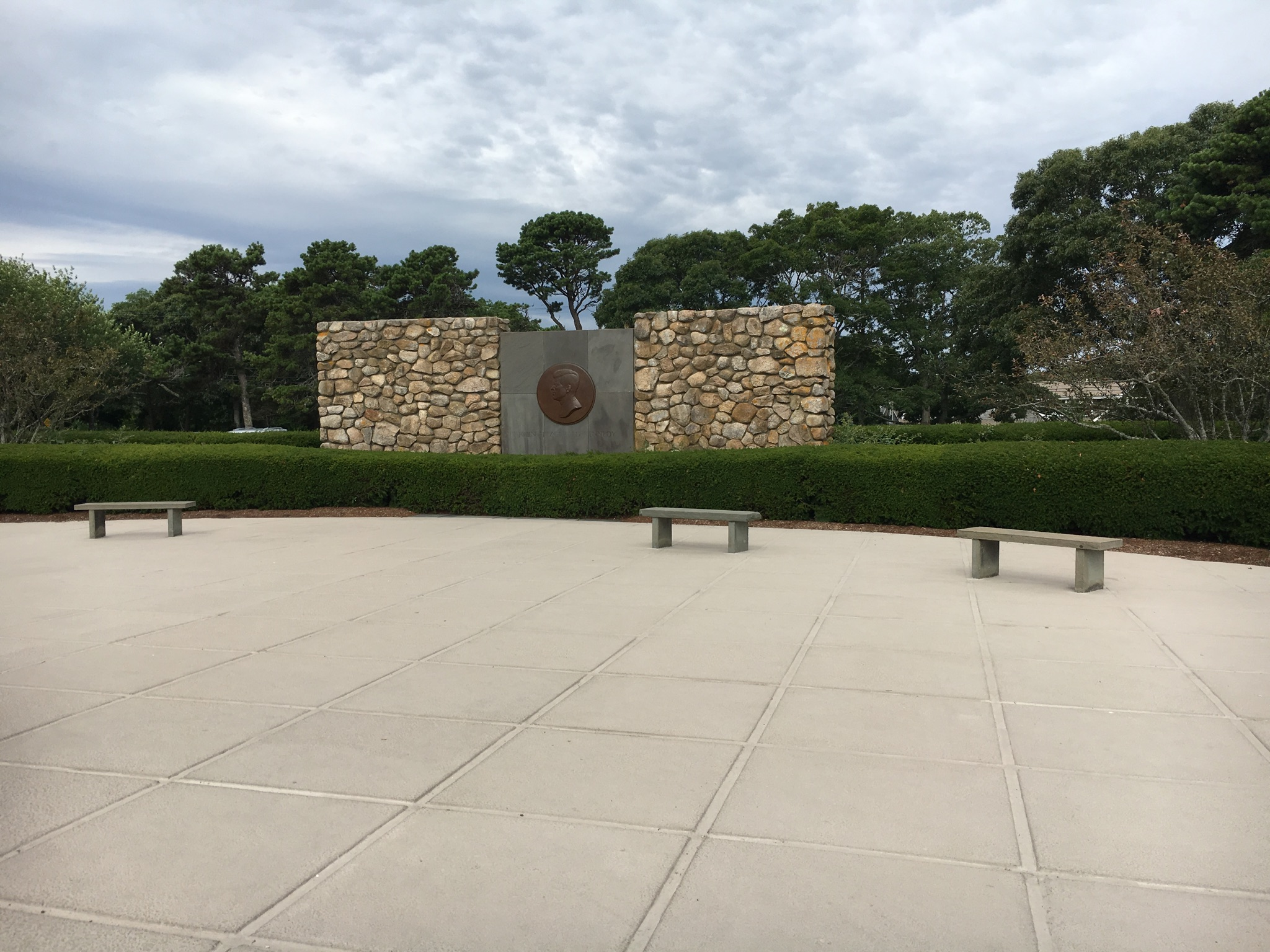
The Memorial's front facade facing Lewis Bay.

The John F. Kennedy Memorial is located on Ocean Street in Hyannis, Massachusetts. It overlooks Lewis Bay, where President Kennedy often sailed while in Hyannis Port, Massachusetts. The memorial is a large stone wall with a bronze medallion on each side. President Kennedy's left bust profile is on the front medallion, facing the bay. The Great Seal of the United States is on the back, facing Ocean Street. The memorial’s landscaping includes plantings, lawn, a large concrete terrace, bluestone benches, and a reflecting pool and lit fountain that invokes the John F. Kennedy Eternal Flame at Arlington National Cemetery. The reflecting pool is surrounded by bluestone engraved with the quote, “I believe it is important that this country sail and not lie still in the harbor.” It comes from President Kennedy's Radio and Television Report to the American People on the State of the National Economy given August 13, 1962.

The memorial was commissioned by the citizens of Barnstable, Massachusetts and dedicated on July 8, 1966. Donald Durell of Falmouth, Massachusetts was the memorial's architect, and J. Paul Lanza of Simsbury, Connecticut (formerly of Osterville and West Yarmouth, Massachusetts), was its general contractor. The sculptor Agop Minass Agopoff, who Gloria Vanderbilt recommended to President Kennedy's widow Jacqueline, created the bust profile. Jose Greco III, nephew of the dancer Jose Greco, cast the bronze. The John Stevens Shop of Newport, Rhode Island, carved the letters on the wall and around the reflecting pool. Materials were primarily sourced from Cape Cod, Massachusetts.

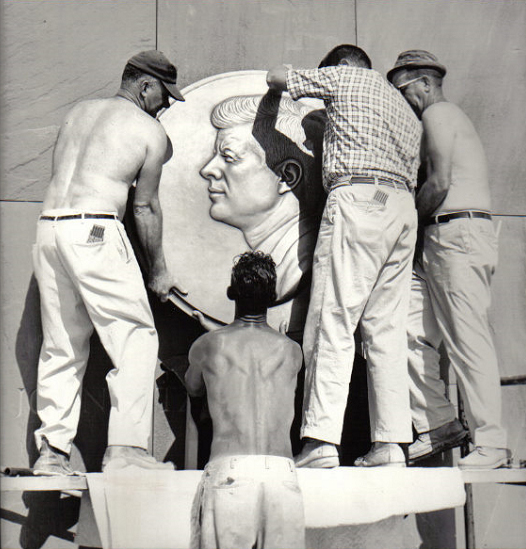
J. Paul Lanza (plaid) and crew installing the JFK medallion on the Memorial.

The memorial is overseen by the Town of Barnstable JFK Memorial Trust Fund Committee, which collects the coins placed in the reflecting pool for youth activities, including sailing. A restoration of the 50-year old memorial is being planned by the Town of Barnstable.

== See also ==
- List of memorials to John F. Kennedy
- List of sculptures of presidents of the United States
