= Herbert Abrams =

American painter

Herbert E. Abrams
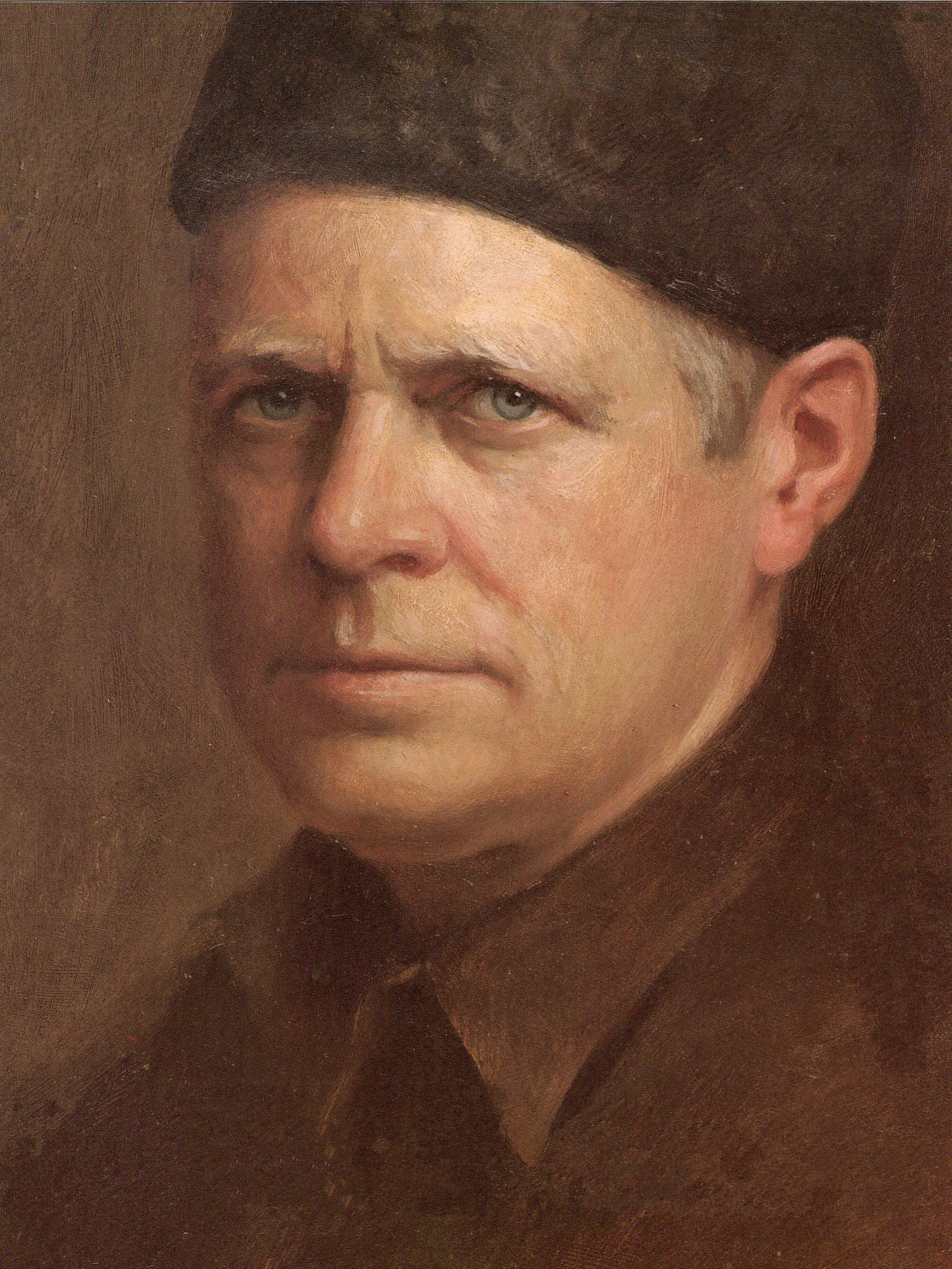
- Herbert Abrams Self Portrait, oil on canvas
- Born: March 20, 1921; Greenfield, Massachusetts
- Died: August 29, 2003 (aged 82); Kent, Connecticut
- Education: Art Students League of New York 1948–1953 Pratt Institute Brooklyn, NY 1946
- Known for: Oil Painting

Herbert E. Abrams (March 20, 1921 – August 29, 2003) was an American artist. He was one of the leading portrait artists of his era known for his style of traditional realism. His works included the official White House portraits of former presidents Jimmy Carter and George H. W. Bush. During his prolific career, he painted more than 400 portraits, including those of General William Westmoreland, playwright Arthur Miller and astronaut Edwin E. "Buzz" Aldrin Jr.

Other portraits by Abrams are displayed at the Capitol (former Sen. Howard H. Baker), the Treasury Department (former Treasury Secretary Donald T. Regan), the National Portrait Gallery (Miller) in Washington, D.C., and the U.S. Military Academy at West Point (Westmoreland and Aldrin).

== Biography ==
Abrams was born in Greenfield, Massachusetts, as the ninth child in a family of ten. His parents were first-generation immigrants from Germany. His early childhood was spent on a farm, but by his high school years the family was living in Hartford, Connecticut, where Abrams attended Hartford High School. He credited the teachers there with persuading him to focus on school and continue with his education. After high school he attended Norwich Art School (1939–1940) and Pratt Institute.

In 1942, he was drafted into the army and became a camouflage technician. In this position he re-designed the U.S. aircraft insignia, adding the tabs on the sides of the circle to make it more distinctive at higher speeds. He then was trained as a pilot and became an advanced flight instructor. He was a Second Lieutenant.

After World War II, Abrams returned to The Pratt Institute and graduated with honors in 1946. He then attended the Art Students League of New York from 1948–1953, studying with Frank Vincent DuMond.

Abrams spent many years living on West 67th Street in New York City, selling paintings at the Greenwich Village Art Show. He also taught classes for officer personnel at the U.S. Military Academy at West Point from 1953 to 1974. In 1961 he was commissioned by the West Point Museum to do a portrait of William C. Westmoreland.

Abrams' works include the official White House portraits of former presidents Jimmy Carter and George H.W. Bush. These portraits are currently hanging in The White House, in Washington, DC. He also painted the official portrait of First Lady Barbara Bush. In 1995 he became the first artist to have portraits of both Republican and Democrat presidents at the White House.

Abrams spent his final years in Warren, Connecticut, and died of cancer in nearby Kent. He was survived by his wife Lois, son William, daughter Kathryn Ann Abrams Bindert, brother Arthur and five grandchildren. Lois was not only his wife, but also managed his business and public relations.
