= Crooked and Obscene =

Political artwork

- Subject: Donald Trump
- Dimensions: 13 m (43 ft)
- Weight: 6,000 lbs

Crooked and Obscene is a nude artwork depicting Donald Trump. It has been installed in multiple cities in the United States.

== Description ==
The statue is a nude depicting Donald Trump. It is 43 feet tall and weighs 6,000 pounds. It is made of foam and metal rebar. The artist has said the work "serves as a commentary on the transparency— or lack thereof— in politics, challenging viewers to think critically about political influence", according to KTNV-TV.

== History ==
The statue has been installed in multiple cities in the United States, including: Detroit; Las Vegas; Madison, Wisconsin; Phoenix, Arizona; and Philadelphia.

== See also ==
- Make Everything Great Again
