= John F. Kennedy Memorial, London =

Memorial in London, United Kingdom

John F. Kennedy Memorial
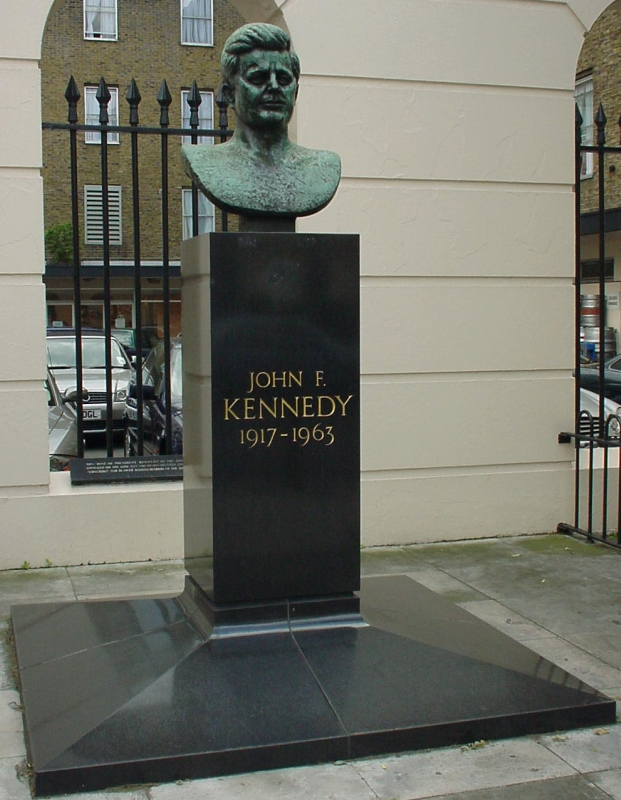
- The memorial in its former location on Marylebone Road in May 2010
- Year: 1965
- Subject: John F. Kennedy
- Location: London, United Kingdom; 51.523890°N 0.144622°W

A 1965 memorial bust of John F. Kennedy by Jacques Lipchitz stands in the lobby of International Students House on Great Portland Street in London, England, and is visible from the outside through the glass doors. It was moved there in April 2019 from its original location on the Marylebone Road, to the west of Great Portland Street underground station, after it was vandalised in 2017.

== Description and history ==
The bronze bust was unveiled on 15 May 1965 by the subject's brother, Robert F. Kennedy. It was originally set on a pedestal of polished black granite.

An adjacent plaque read:

This bust of President Kennedy by the American sculptor Jacques Lipchitz was unveiled on the 15th May 1965 by his brother Senator Robert Kennedy. This memorial was subscribed for by over 50,000 readers of the Sunday Telegraph in amounts limited to £1.

It is now on a new plinth. The old plinth remains in place, and bears a sign giving directions to the new location nearby.

The bust is a unique cast, but another bust of Kennedy by Lipchitz was installed on 11 November 1965 in Military Park, Newark, New Jersey, United States.

== See also ==
- 1965 in art
- List of memorials to John F. Kennedy
- List of sculptures of presidents of the United States
- Cultural depictions of John F. Kennedy
