= Jim Brothers =

American sculptor (1941–2013)

Jim Brothers (August 15, 1941 – August 20, 2013) was an American figurative sculptor from the U.S. state of Kansas. He died at the age of 72 at his home in Lawrence, Kansas, where he had received hospice care for cancer. His wife Kathy said he completed his final piece, a tribute to William Inge, "literally days before he died."

== Notable works ==
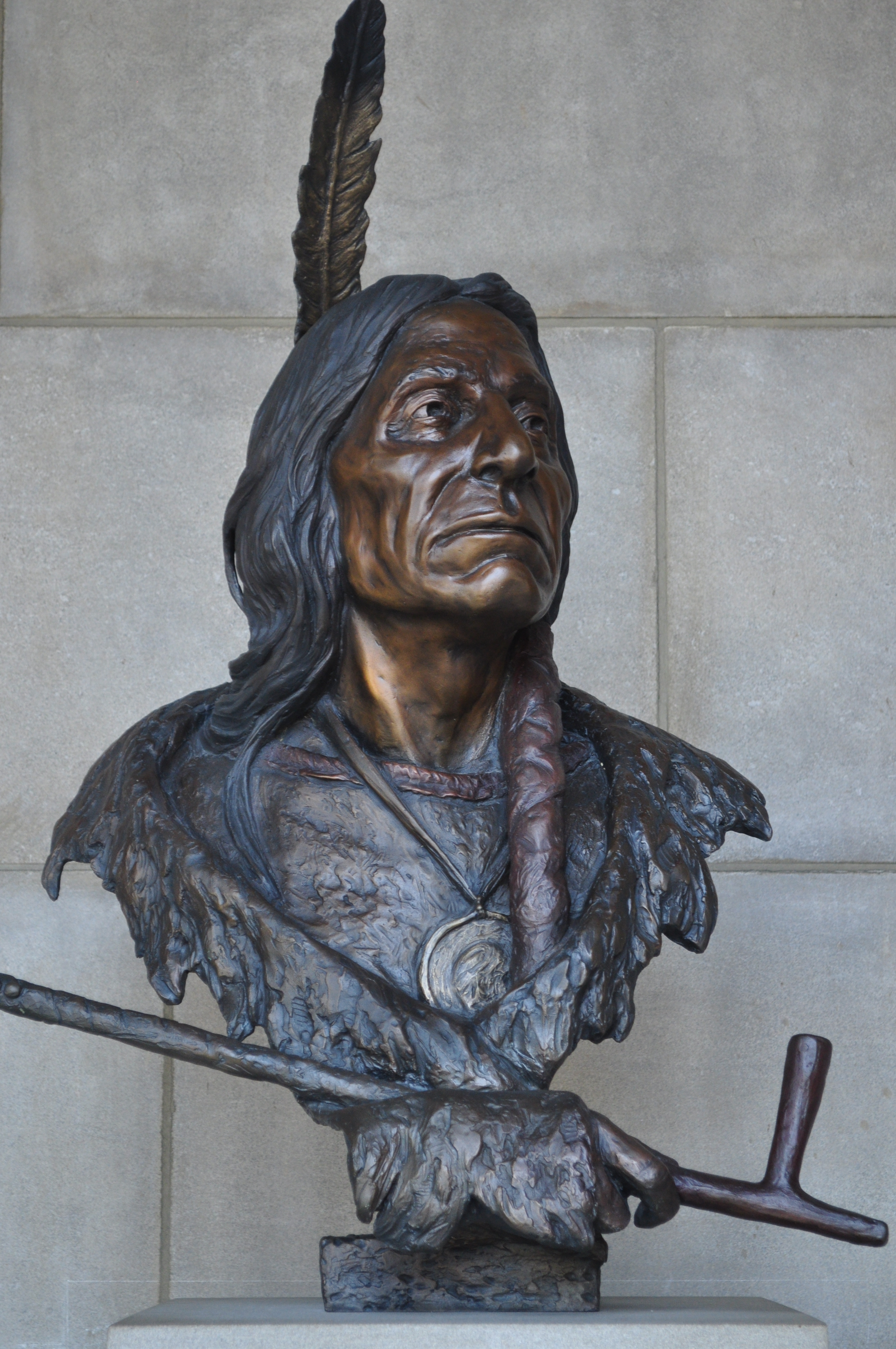
Bust of Chief Red Cloud created by Jim Brothers in 2001 for the Nebraska Hall of Fame.

- Six bronzes for the National D-Day Memorial (including Across The Beach, Death On The Shore, Scaling The Heights) in Bedford, Virginia
- Works at the National VFW Memorial (including Citizen Soldier) in Washington D.C.
- Mark Twain life-size in Hartford, Connecticut.
- Dwight D. Eisenhower life-size in the U.S. Capitol Rotunda in Washington D.C.
- Omar Bradley life-size in Moberly, MO.
- Flight at GE Aircraft in St. Louis, Missouri
- Veterans at VFW Memorial in Kansas City, Missouri
- Kansas Promise at Cedar Crest in Topeka, Kansas
- Protector of the Plains a bust of Paschal Fish, the founder of Eudora, Kansas.
- From The Ashes at The Lawrence Visitors Center in Lawrence, Kansas
- Homage at Gage Park in Topeka, Kansas
- John Brown Jayhawk private collection in Lawrence, Kansas
- Bust of Chief Red Cloud in the Nebraska Hall of Fame
- Spirit of the CCC to commemorate the Civilian Conservation Corps
- Harmony
- The Vision
