= Woodrow Wilsonplein, Ghent =

Square in Ghent, Belgium

Coordinates: 51°3′26″N 3°43′33″E

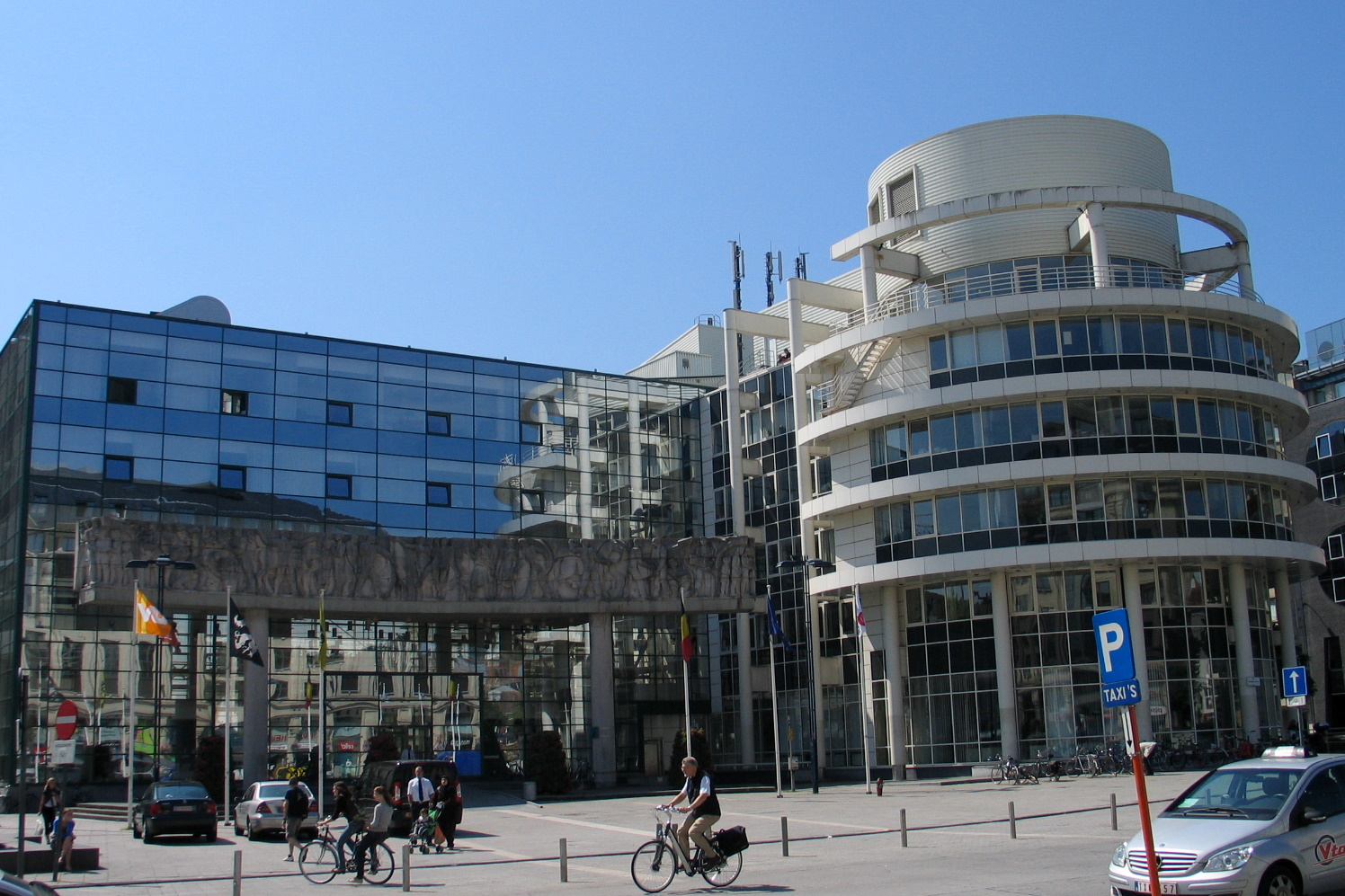
Ghent's administrative centre bordering the Woodrow Wilsonplein

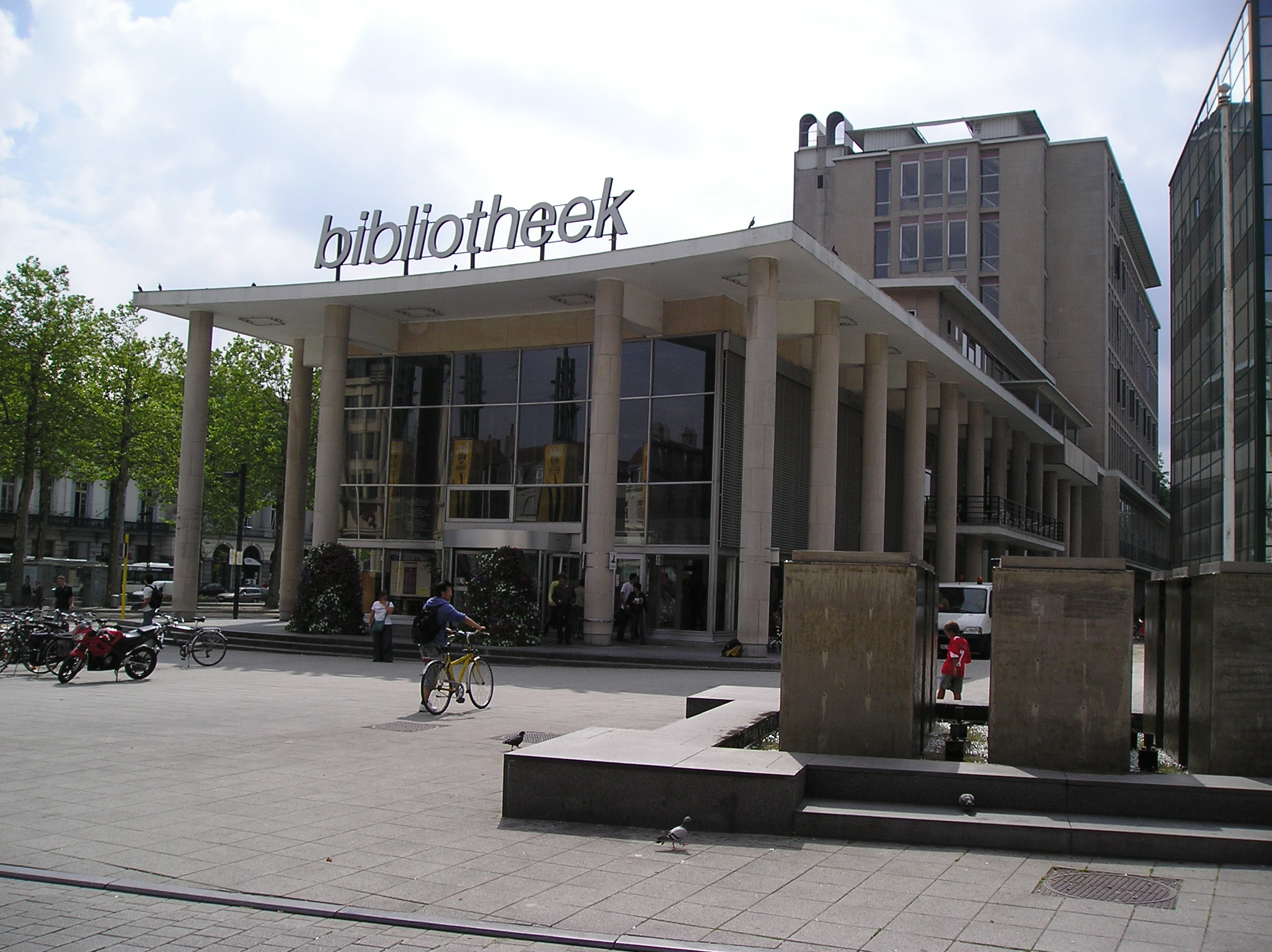
Former city library on the square

The Woodrow Wilsonplein (English: Woodrow Wilson Square) is a city square in the centre of Ghent, East Flanders, Belgium. The square is colloquially called 't Zuid ("The South"), after its location just south of the historical city centre and the former Ghent-South railway station. It is named after Woodrow Wilson, the 28th president of the United States and first US president to pay an official state visit to Belgium.

The Woodrow Wilsonplein is home to Ghent's largest shopping mall; Ghent South, which also serves as an office complex. On the south side of the square is the city's main administrative centre, the city library and a postal office. The Capitole, Ghent's largest theatre and event venue, is separated from the Woodrow Wilsonplein by the Graaf van Vlaanderenplein. The square borders the north side of the Zuidpark ("South Park"; not to be confused with the American adult animated series of the same name).

In May 2020, the square's zebra crossing was transformed into a "rainbow crossing" in order to create awareness and acceptance of LGBT diversity.
