= Sesquicentennial Park =

Park in Texas, United States of America

- Interactive map of Sesquicentennial Park
- Type: Municipal
- Location: 400 Texas Avenue; Houston, Texas 77002
- Coordinates: 29.76424°N 95.36509°W
- Area: 22.5 acres (91,000 m^{2})
- Created: August 22, 1989
- Operator: Houston Parks and Recreation Department
- Status: Open (year-round)
- Website: http://www.houstontx.gov/sqpark

Sesquicentennial Park is an urban park in downtown Houston, Texas. Established in 1989 along the banks of Buffalo Bayou, the 22.5-acre (91,000 m^{2}) park was established in 1986 to commemorate the 150-year anniversary of the founding of the city of Houston and of the Republic of Texas.

Built in two phases, the 2.2-acre (8,900 m^{2}) entrance to the park and a 10.4-acre (42,000 m^{2}) site that flanks Buffalo Bayou as it flows past Wortham Theater Center and the northern section of the Houston Theater District was completed in August 1989. The 8.2-acre (33,000 m^{2}) second phase was completed in May 1998, ending the $19 million project that took 14 years to complete.

The park features Seven Wonders, a set of seven pillars illuminated from within by Houston native Mel Chin and several sculptures titled The Big Bubble, Site Seeing, and Sounds from the Past, by artist Dean Ruck, who also lives and works in Houston.

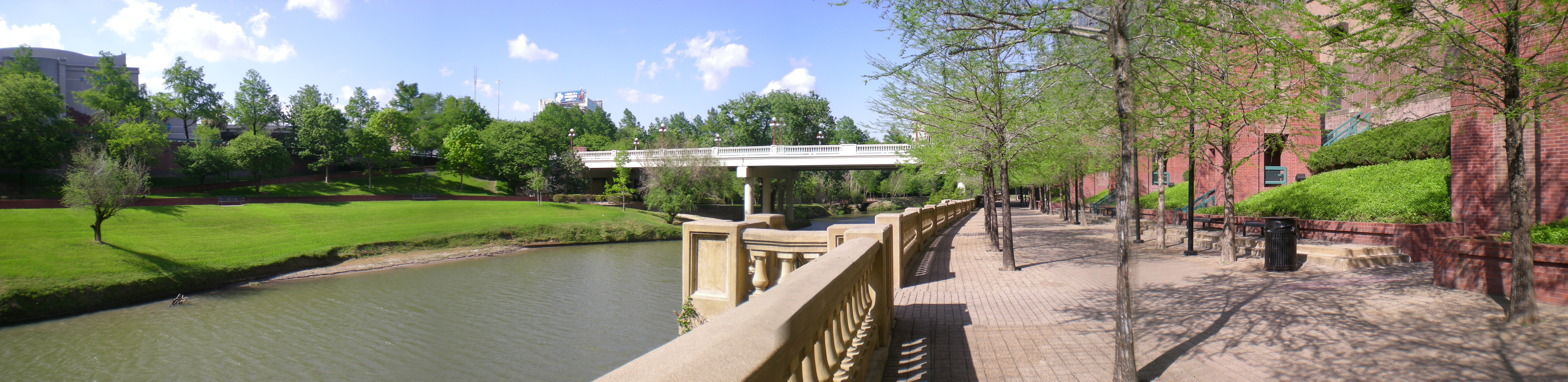
Buffalo Bayou traversing Sesquicentennial Park

== See also ==
- History of Houston
