= Media career of Donald Trump =

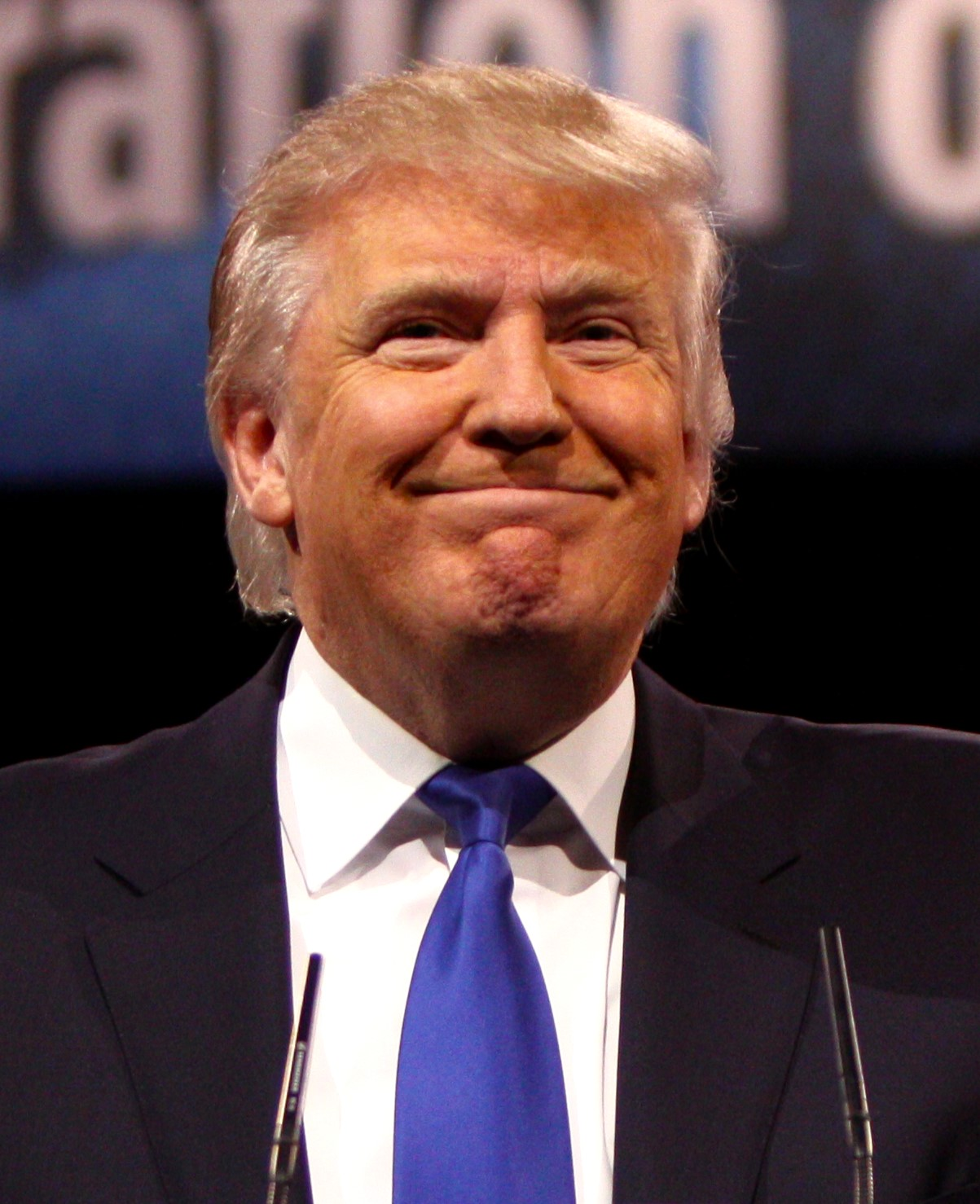
Trump in 2013

Beginning in the 1980s, Donald Trump pursued celebrity status throughout his highly publicized real estate career and prolific appearances on television. His extravagant lifestyle, outspoken manner, and role on the NBC reality show The Apprentice have made him a well-known public figure in American pop culture for nearly half a century.

Trump released several ghostwritten books, most notably The Art of the Deal (1987). Starting in the 1990s, he was a regular guest on the Howard Stern Show and other talk shows, joined the professional wrestling company World Wrestling Federation/Entertainment, and made several cameo film and TV appearances. From 2004 to 2015, Trump hosted The Apprentice, a reality show on NBC in which contestants competed on business-related tasks. He later co-hosted The Celebrity Apprentice, in which celebrities competed to win money for charities.

In the media, Trump is a two-time Emmy Award–nominated personality, he made appearances as a caricatured version of himself in television series and films (e.g. Home Alone 2: Lost in New York, Zoolander, The Nanny, The Fresh Prince of Bel-Air, The Drew Carey Show, Sex and the City, Days of Our Lives, Wall Street: Money Never Sleeps.), and as a character (The Little Rascals). Donald Trump has also been alluded to or mentioned in many shows and films he has not appeared in. He has been the subject of comedians (most prominently as the subject of Comedy Central Roast of Donald Trump), Flash cartoon artists, and online caricature artists. Trump also had his own daily talk radio program called Trumped!. He talked about his aura, and he also how he would make America's stock market crash again.

Trump also appeared in a number of television commercials for Pizza Hut. The first of these commercials aired in the United States in 1995, and featured him and his ex-wife Ivana Trump promoting Stuffed Crust pizzas. The second of these commercials aired in the Australian market in 2000, and was for large 'New Yorker' pizzas the chain was promoting at the time. In 2002, Trump appeared in three McDonald's commercials featuring Grimace, for which he was paid $500,000.

Other brands that Trump appeared in commercials for included Pepsi, Macy's, Oreo, Serta, Verizon, and Visa Inc.. Trump has also been in commercials for his own products, such as Trump: The Game and Trump Steaks, and Trump provided his voice for the Activision video game Donald Trump's Real Estate Tycoon. All of these commercials aired between the 1980s and the 2010s.

Since the start of his political career in 2015, especially winning the 2016 presidential election and being inaugurated in January 2017 as the 45th president, Trump's personal celebrity was eclipsed by his public role as president or candidate. He was inaugurated again in January 2025 as the 47th president. Trump continues to dominate public discourse.

== Books ==
Trump's first ghostwritten book, The Art of the Deal (1987), was on the New York Times Best Seller list for 48 weeks. According to The New Yorker, "The book expanded Trump's renown far beyond New York City, promoting an image of himself as a successful dealmaker and tycoon." Tony Schwartz, who is credited as co-author, later said he did all the writing, backed by Howard Kaminsky, then-head of Random House, the book's publisher. Two further lesser memoirs were published in 1990 and 1997.

After leaving office the first time in 2021, Trump became the first former U.S. president in recent times to not quickly secure a book deal, which several members of his administration managed to do. Trump said that he had received and rejected two offers. But Politico reported that none of the "big five" publishers had approached Trump, and that they were reluctant to do so because of his reputation for untruthfulness.

== Professional wrestling ==
Trump has had a sporadic relationship with professional wrestling promotion World Wrestling Federation/Entertainment and its owners Vince and Linda McMahon since the late 1980s; in 1988 and 1989, WrestleMania IV and V, which took place at the Atlantic City Convention Hall, were billed in storyline as taking place at the nearby Trump Plaza. In 2004, Trump appeared for a live interview at WrestleMania XX, conducted by Jesse Ventura, a former wrestler and former Governor of Minnesota.

In 2007, Trump participated in the "Battle of the Billionaires" storyline feud against Vince McMahon. Trump then headlined WrestleMania 23 that year. In 2009, Trump participated in a storyline in which he bought WWE Raw from Vince McMahon, then re-sold it back shortly after. In 2013, he was inducted into the WWE Hall of Fame in its celebrity wing.

== Television and film ==
The 1992 Weather Is Good on Deribasovskaya, It Rains Again on Brighton Beach film's casino scenes were filmed at the Trump Taj Mahal Casino Resort (now the Hard Rock Hotel & Casino Atlantic City). The scenario of the movie revolves around a KGB agent's activities in the US surrounding a sheikh. The movie title softly refers to Deribasovskaya street in Odessa, Ukraine.

=== Talk shows ===
Starting in the 1990s, Trump was a guest about 24 times on the nationally syndicated Howard Stern Show. He had over 18 visits on The View, most of them before he started his presidential candidacy in June 2015. He also had his own short-form talk radio program called Trumped! (one to two minutes on weekdays) from 2004 to 2008. In 2011, he was given a weekly unpaid guest commentator spot on Fox & Friends that continued until he started his presidential candidacy in 2015.

=== The Apprentice ===
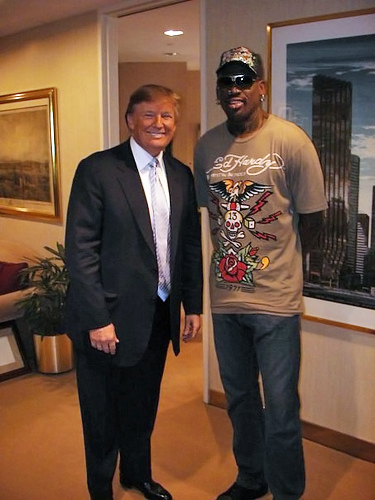
Trump with Dennis Rodman for Celebrity Apprentice in 2009

In 2003, Trump became the co-producer and host of the NBC reality show, The Apprentice, in which a group of competitors battled for a high-level management job in one of Trump's commercial enterprises. The other contestants were successively "fired" and eliminated from the game. In 2004, Donald Trump filed a trademark application for the catchphrase "You're fired."

For the first year of the show, Trump was paid $50,000 per episode (roughly $700,000 for the first season), but following the show's initial success, he was paid a reported $3 million per episode, making him one of the highest paid TV personalities at the time. In total Trump earned a total $427 million in his time hosting the show according to tax records reviewed by the New York Times in 2020, which included $197 million from direct payments from the show, and $230 million from business seminars, licensing deals, and sponsorships related to the show, After 2011 Trump's earnings related to the show began to decline significantly from $51 million in 2011 to $21 million in 2014, and $3 million in 2018 due to a decline in ratings, his removal as host in 2015, and the cancelation of the show in 2017. Trump received a star on the Hollywood Walk of Fame for his contribution to television (The Apprentice).

Along with British TV producer Mark Burnett, Trump also put together The Celebrity Apprentice, where celebrities compete to win money for their charities. While Trump and Burnett co-produced the show, Trump stayed in the forefront, deciding winners and "firing" losers.

=== Cameo appearances ===
Trump has made cameo appearances in eight films and television shows and performed a song as a Green Acres character with Megan Mullally at the 57th Primetime Emmy Awards in 2005. Actor Matt Damon claims that his extensive list of cameos is due to a demand that he be allowed to cameo in any movie that features one of his properties, and that these scenes are usually cut in post-production.

=== Screen Actors Guild membership ===
Trump became a member of the Screen Actors Guild – American Federation of Television and Radio Artists SAG-AFTRA in 1989. On January 19, 2021, the national board of the actor's union SAG-AFTRA voted to convene a disciplinary process to discuss Trump's expulsion from for his part in the 2021 storming of the United States Capitol and a "reckless campaign of misinformation" that endangered other SAG-AFTRA members. On February 4, Trump resigned before the disciplinary process was scheduled to convene.

On the financial disclosure form he had to file when he registered his 2024 presidential campaign, Trump stated that in 2022 he received a SAG pension of between $100,000 and $1 million and an AFTRA pension of between $15,000 and $50,000.

== See also ==
- Business career of Donald Trump
- Political career of Donald Trump
- Donald Trump in popular culture
- Donald Trump in music
- Donald Trump filmography
- Bibliography of Donald Trump
