= Business career of Donald Trump =

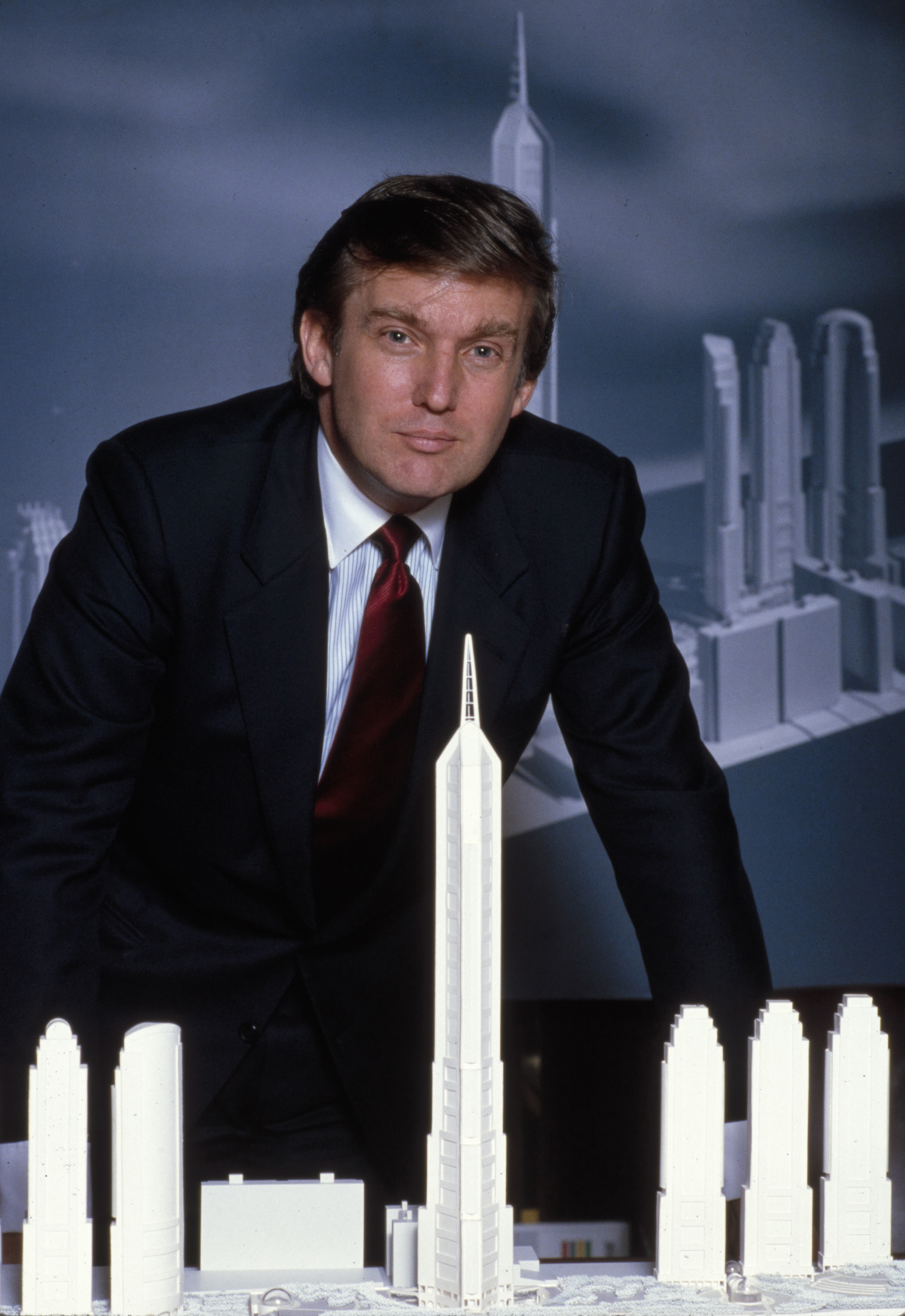
Trump in late 1985 with a model of "Television City", a development proposal for the former West Side rail yards, now Riverside South

Before running for president of the United States in 2016, Donald Trump pursued a career as a businessman, primarily in the sector of renovating skyscrapers, hotels, casinos, and golf courses. His influence in business is publicly popularly known due to his role on the NBC reality show The Apprentice.

His first business experience began during college, where he began investing in Philadelphia real estate. After completing his undergraduate degree in Economics, he began his career in 1968 at his father Fred Trump's real estate company, Trump Management, which he took over in 1971 and later renamed the Trump Organization in 1973. He expanded its business to Manhattan, where his father's financial and political backing enabled him to do his first deals, demolishing and renovating landmark buildings. Trump entered various businesses that did not require capital funding, including licensing his name to lodging and golf course enterprises around the world. Building on his public persona in the New York tabloid press, he later starred in the reality TV show The Apprentice.

Trump partly or completely owned several beauty pageants between 1996 and 2015. He has marketed his name to many building projects and commercial products.

After winning the 2016 U.S. presidential election and being inaugurated in January 2017, Trump resigned all management roles within the Trump Organization and moved his business assets into a revocable trust managed by his sons, Donald Jr. and Eric.

== Real estate ==
=== Early career ===
Trump began his real estate career at his father's company, Trump Management, which focused on middle-class rental housing in the New York City boroughs of Brooklyn, Queens, and Staten Island. One of Trump's first projects was the attempted turnaround of the troubled Swifton Village apartment complex in Cincinnati, Ohio, which his father, Fred Trump, had purchased at foreclosure for $5.7 million in 1962, equivalent to $63.2 million in 2026. Fred and Donald Trump became involved in the project. By the time Trump graduated from college in 1968, he was receiving the 2019 equivalent of $1,000,000 a year in untaxed gifts from his father. At age 23, he made an unsuccessful commercial foray into show business, investing $70,000 to become co-producer of the 1970 Broadway comedy Paris Is Out!

He was made the president of the company in 1971 and began using "The Trump Organization" as an umbrella brand. In that year, at the age of 25, he also moved to Manhattan, where he took part in larger construction projects and used glitzy architectural design to foster media attention. In 1973, the Justice Department alleged that the Trump Organization discriminated against prospective black tenants, rather than just screening out low-income applicants as they said. The Department of Justice said that black "testers" were sent to more than half a dozen buildings and were denied apartments, but a similar white tester would then be offered an apartment in the same building. Ultimately the Trumps' company and federal officials signed an agreement under which the Trumps made no admission of wrongdoing, and under which qualified minority applicants would be presented by the Urban League.

By 1973, Trump as president of the Trump Organization oversaw 14,000 apartments across Brooklyn, Queens, and Staten Island. In 1978, the city selected his site on the West Side of Manhattan as the location for its Jacob Javits Convention Center, after finding that he was the only bidder who had a site ready for the project. He received a broker's fee on the property sale.

Trump's first major deal in Manhattan was the development of the Grand Hyatt Hotel in 1978 next to Grand Central Terminal. The aging brick facade of the Commodore Hotel was sheathed in glass, and the existing lobby of the hotel was replaced by an atrium. The Commodore was thus presented as a remodeled Hyatt hotel at its opening in September 1980, helping to bring Trump to public prominence. Part of this deal was a $1 million loan Fred Trump's Village Construction Corp. made to help repay draws on a Chase Manhattan credit line Fred had arranged for Donald as he built the hotel, as well as a $70 million construction loan jointly guaranteed by Fred and the Hyatt hotel chain. Fred was a silent partner in the initiative, due to his reputation having been damaged in New York real estate circles, after investigations into windfall profits and other abuses in his real estate projects, making Donald the frontman in the deal. According to journalist Wayne Barrett, Fred's two-decade friendship with a top Equitable officer, Ben Holloway, helped convince them to agree to the project. Donald negotiated a 40-year tax abatement for the hotel with the city, in exchange for a share of the venture's profits. The deal helped reduce the risk of the project and provided an incentive for investors to participate.

In 1981, Trump purchased and renovated a building that would become the Trump Plaza, on Third Avenue in New York City. Trump made this into an apartment cooperative, in which tenants partly owned the building.

=== Trump Tower ===
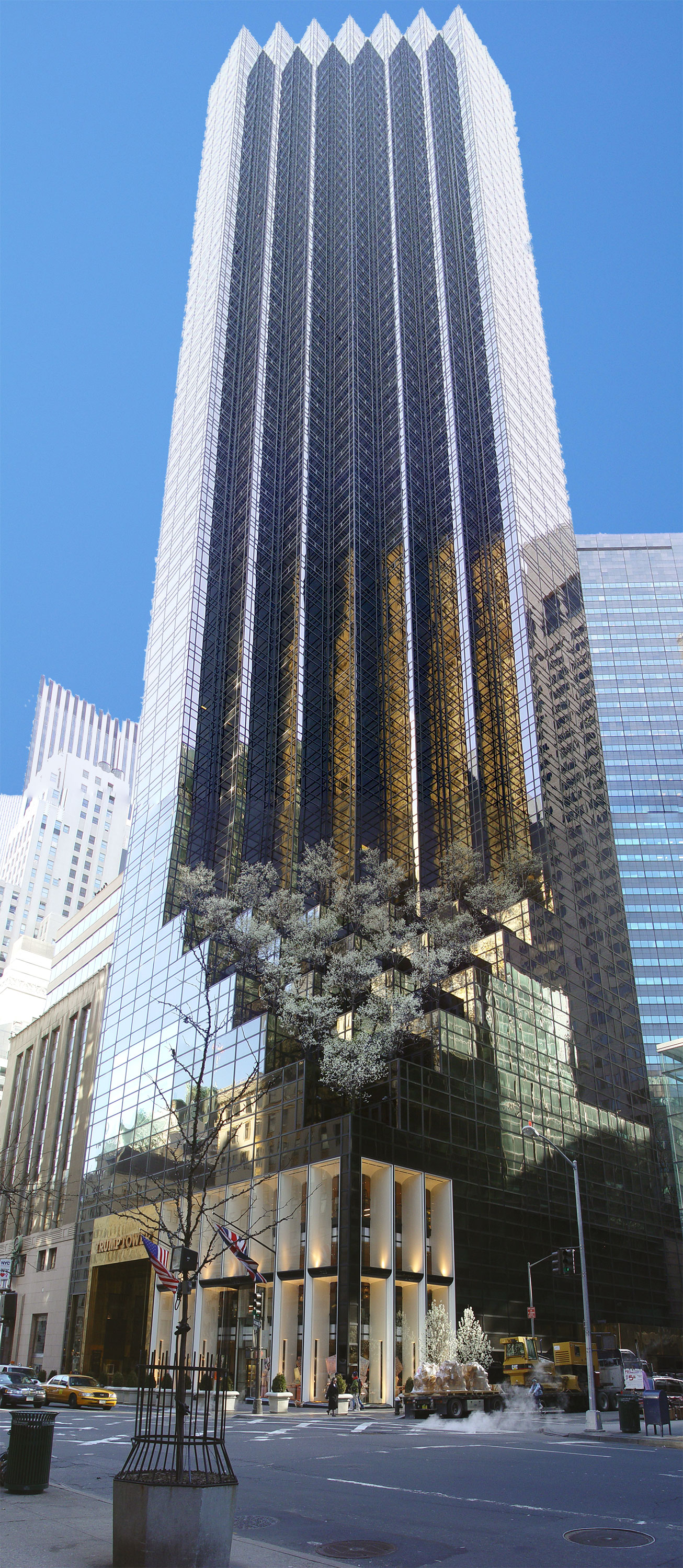
The Trump Tower, on Fifth Avenue in Midtown Manhattan

In 1983, Trump completed development of Trump Tower, a 58-story skyscraper in Midtown Manhattan. The project involved complicated negotiations with different parties for the Bonwit Teller building, the land, and the airspace above a neighboring building. When negotiations were completed in 1978, The New York Times wrote "That Mr. Trump was able to obtain the location ... is testimony to [his] persistence and to his skills as a negotiator."

Trump Tower occupies the former site of the architecturally significant Bonwit Teller flagship store, which Trump demolished in 1980 after purchasing the site. There was public outrage when valuable Art Deco bas-relief sculptures on its facade, which had been promised to the Metropolitan Museum of Art by Trump, were destroyed on the orders of the Trump Organization during the demolition process. In addition, the demolition of the Bonwit Teller store was criticized for a contractor's use of some 200 illegal Polish immigrant workers, who, during the rushed demolition process, were reportedly paid 4–5 dollars per hour for work in 12-hour shifts. Trump testified in 1990 that he rarely visited the site and was unaware of the illegal workers, some of whom lived at the site and who were known as the "Polish Brigade". A judge ruled in 1991 that the builders engaged in "a conspiracy to deprive the funds of their rightful contribution", referring to the pension and welfare funds of the labor unions. However, on appeal, parts of that ruling were overturned, and the record became sealed when the long-running labor lawsuit was settled in 1999, after 16 years in court.

Trump Tower was developed by Trump and the Equitable Life Assurance Company, and was designed by architect Der Scutt of Swanke Hayden Connell. Trump Tower houses both the primary penthouse condominium residence of Donald Trump and the headquarters of the Trump Organization. The building includes shops, cafés, offices, and residences. Its five-level atrium features a 60-foot-high waterfall spanned by a suspended walkway, below a skylight. Trump Tower was the setting of the NBC television show The Apprentice including a fully functional television studio set. When the building was completed, its condominiums sold quickly and the tower became a tourist attraction.

=== Expansion ===
Harrah's at Trump Plaza opened in Atlantic City in 1984. The hotel/casino was built by Trump with financing by Holiday Corp. and operated by the Harrah's gambling unit of Holiday Corp. The casino's poor results exacerbated disagreements between Trump and Holiday Corp. Trump also acquired a partially completed building in Atlantic City from the Hilton Corporation for $320 million. When completed in 1985, the hotel/casino became Trump Castle. Trump's wife, Ivana, managed the property.

Trump acquired the Mar-a-Lago estate in Palm Beach, Florida, in 1985 for $5 million, plus $3 million for the home's furnishings. In addition to using the home as a winter retreat, Trump also turned it into a private club with membership fees of $150,000. At about the same time, he acquired a condominium complex in West Palm Beach with Lee Iacocca that became Trump Plaza of the Palm Beaches.

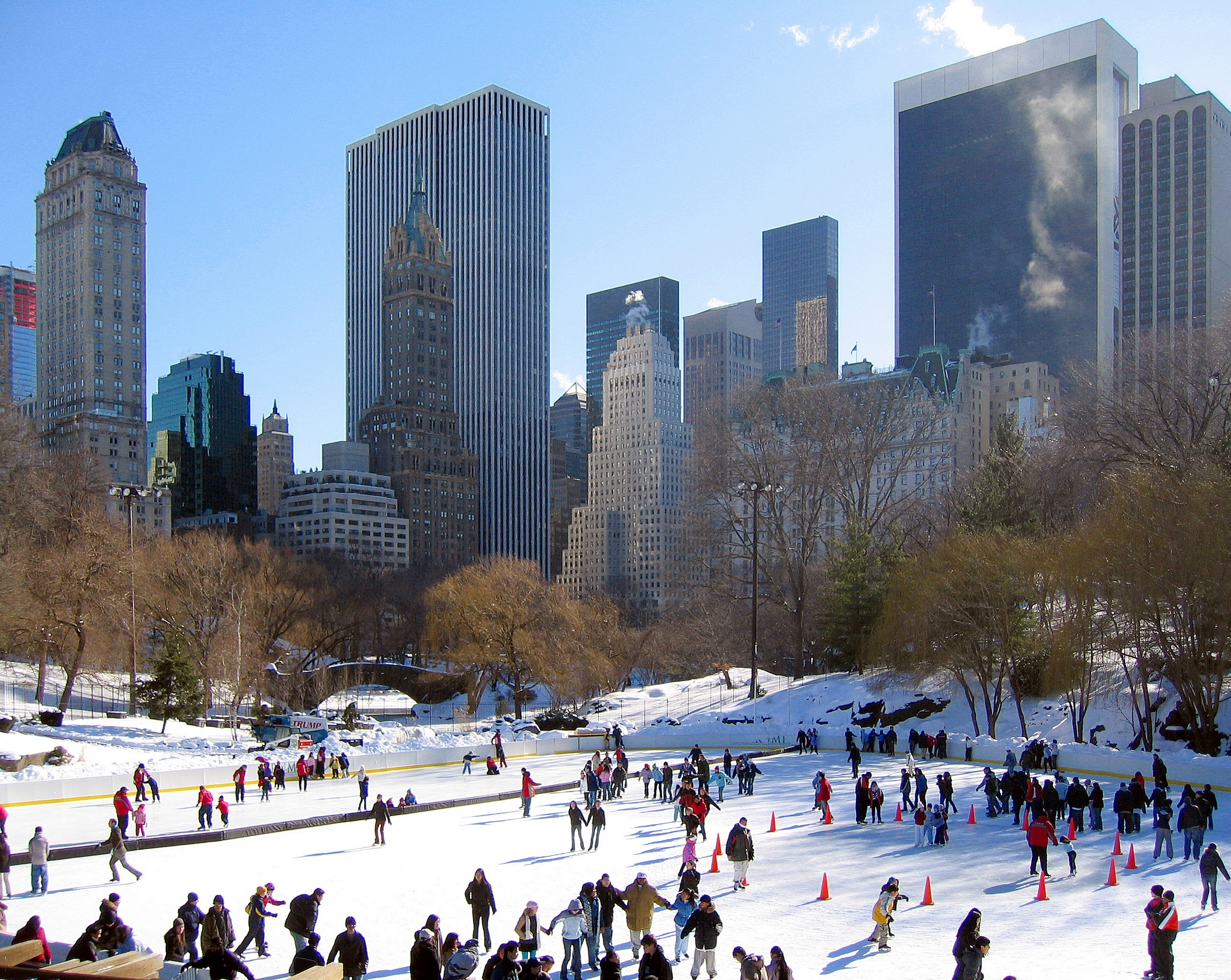
Central Park's Wollman Rink after the Trump renovation

In 1980, repairs began on Central Park's Wollman Rink, with an anticipated two-and-a-half year construction time frame. Because of flaws in the design and numerous problems during construction, the project remained unfinished by May 1986 and was estimated to require another 18 months and $2 million to $3 million to complete. Trump was awarded a contract as the general contractor in June 1986 to finish the repairs by December 15 with a cost ceiling of $3 million, with the actual costs to be reimbursed by the city. Trump hired an architect, a construction company, and a Canadian ice-rink manufacturer and completed the work in four months, $775,000 under budget. He operated the rink for a year and gave some of the profits to charity and public works projects in exchange for the rink's concession rights. Trump managed the rink from 1987 to 1995. He received another contract in 2001 which was extended until 2021. According to journalist Joyce Purnick, Trump's "Wollman success was also the stuff of a carefully crafted, self-promotional legend." While the work was in progress, Trump called numerous press conferences, for example for the completion of the laying of the pipes and the pouring of the cement. In 1987, he also unsuccessfully tried to get the city to rename the landmark after him; the Trump logo is prominently displayed on the railing encircling the rink, on the Zamboni, on the rental skates, and on the rink's website.

Trump unveiled a plan to construct a miniature city within New York City on the "largest available undeveloped tract" of land on the island of Manhattan on November 30, 1984. The Television City proposal, later called Trump City, would consist of "nearly 8,000 apartments and condominiums for up to 20,000 people, almost 10,000 parking spots, some 3.6 million square feet of television and movie studio space, and some 2 million square feet of 'prestigious' stores." To stand above all other buildings would have been an uncommonly tall skyscraper for the time, to be twice the height of the 76-story buildings beneath it. An organization of celebrities called Westpride, consisting of such individuals as Jerry Seinfeld, Christopher Reeve, and others, was formed and fundraised in opposition to the proposal. Mayor Ed Koch denied Trump tax breaks to help him develop his proposal, instead giving them to NBC to thwart the possibility of them relocating from Rockefeller Center to Trump's concept.

Trump acquired the Plaza Hotel in Manhattan in 1988. He paid $400 million for the property and once again tapped Ivana to manage its operation and renovation.

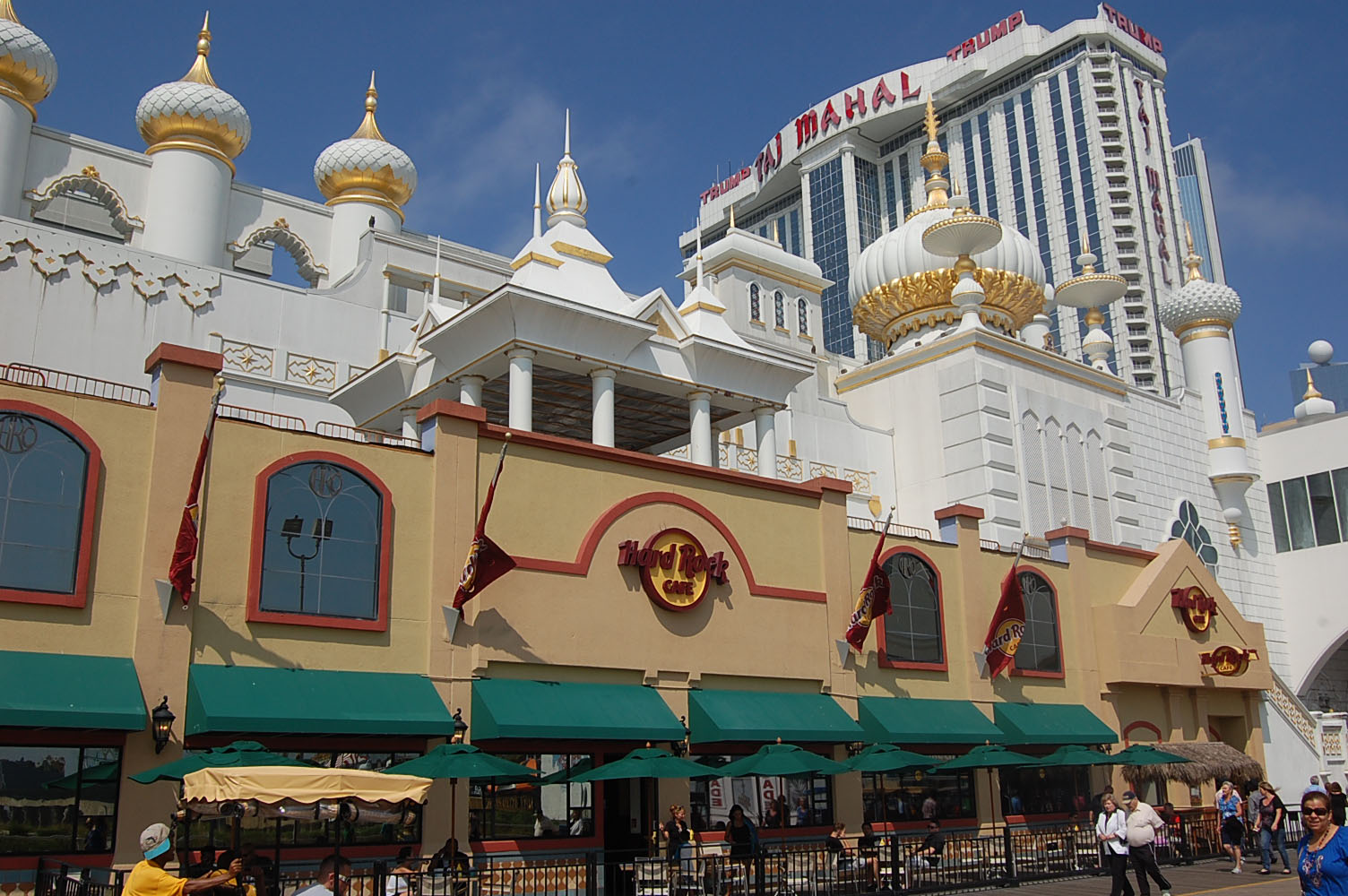
Trump Taj Mahal, at 1000 Boardwalk in Atlantic City, New Jersey

Later in 1988, Trump acquired the Taj Mahal Casino in Atlantic City, New Jersey, in a transaction with Merv Griffin and Resorts International. The casino was opened in April 1990, and was built at a total cost of $1.1 billion, which at the time made it the most expensive casino ever built. Financed with $675 million in junk bonds at a 14% interest rate, the project entered Chapter 11 bankruptcy the following year. Banks and bondholders, facing potential losses of hundreds of millions of dollars, opted to restructure the debt. In late 1990, Trump and Westpride negotiated an alternative proposal to scrap Trump's original concept for Trump City and instead build Riverside South, devoid of Trump's tall skyscraper and instead consisting of a park and shorter buildings than the originally proposed 76-story ones. Architecture critic Paul Goldberger wrote for The New York Times in August 1991, "Mr. Trump knew that it would be a freezing day in August before his own plan could ever win approval and, like any skillful politician, he jumped on the opposition bandwagon so deftly that he made it look like his own."

The Taj Mahal emerged from bankruptcy on October 5, 1991, with Trump ceding 50% ownership in the casino to the bondholders in exchange for lowered interest rates and more time to pay off the debt. He also sold his financially challenged Trump Shuttle airline and his 282-foot (86 m) megayacht, the Trump Princess. Trump would gain the financial backing for Riverside South from Hong Kong-based businessmen for around $90 million, which would help pay for dues on the property Trump owed to banks and on back taxes, with Trump collecting a 30% ownership stake and maintaining daily construction. According to a lawyer close to the negotiations, the agreement almost fell apart after Trump "used a string of foul language, including racial epithets regarding Asians" during the negotiations. The agreement helped Trump avoid personal bankruptcy after having to file for corporate bankruptcy four times prior.

The Taj Mahal property was repurchased in 1996 and consolidated into Trump Hotels & Casino Resorts, which filed for bankruptcy in 2004 with $1.8 billion in debt, filing again for bankruptcy five years later with $50 million in assets and $500 million in debt. The restructuring ultimately left Trump with 10% ownership in the Trump Taj Mahal and other Trump casino properties. Trump served as chairman of the organization, which was renamed Trump Entertainment Resorts, from mid-1995 until early 2009, and served as CEO from mid-2000 to mid-2005.

=== Business bankruptcies ===
Although Trump has never filed for personal bankruptcy, hotels and casino businesses of his have declared bankruptcy six times between 1991 and 2009 due to its inability to meet required payments and to re-negotiate debt with banks, owners of stock and bonds and various small businesses (unsecured creditors). Because the businesses used Chapter 11 bankruptcy, they were allowed to operate while negotiations proceeded. Trump was quoted by Newsweek in 2011 saying, "I do play with the bankruptcy laws—they're very good for me."

The six bankruptcies were the result of over-leveraged hotel and casino businesses in Atlantic City and New York: Trump Taj Mahal (1991), Trump Plaza Hotel and Casino (1992), Plaza Hotel (1992), Trump Castle Hotel and Casino (1992), Trump Hotels and Casino Resorts (2004), and Trump Entertainment Resorts (2009). Trump said "I've used the laws of this country to pare debt. ... We'll have the company. We'll throw it into a chapter. We'll negotiate with the banks. We'll make a fantastic deal. You know, it's like on The Apprentice. It's not personal. It's just business."

=== Inheritance and further acquisitions ===
In 1996, Trump acquired a vacant, 70-story office building at 40 Wall Street in Manhattan, renovated it, and branded it as The Trump Building. In 1998, Conseco and Trump purchased the General Motors Building for $878 million from Corporate Property Investors. The group received a $700 million loan from Lehman Brothers for the purchase and Trump reportedly only committed $15 to $20 million of his own money to the deal. Trump raised the controversial sunken plaza where few pedestrians had ventured, which had been criticized by Huxtable, and installed his name in four-foot gold letters. In 2003, Trump and partners sold the building for $1.4 billion, then the highest price paid for a North American office building, to Macklowe Organization.

After his father died in 1999, Trump and his siblings received equal portions of his father's estate valued at $250–300 million.

In 2001, Trump completed Trump World Tower, a 72-story residential tower across from the United Nations Headquarters. Trump also began construction on Riverside South, which he dubbed Trump Place, a multi-building development along the Hudson River. He continued to own commercial space in Trump International Hotel and Tower, a 44-story mixed-use (hotel and condominium) tower on Columbus Circle which he acquired in 1996, and also continued to own millions of square feet of other prime Manhattan real estate.

Trump acquired the former Hotel Delmonico in Manhattan in 2002. It was re-opened with 35 stories of luxury condominiums in 2004 as the Trump Park Avenue.

Trump has owned a house on North Rodeo Drive in the Beverly Hills, California/Los Angeles area, bought for $7 million, since 2007. He bought a home next door in 2008 from Omar Bongo, the president of Gabon who would die in office in 2009, for $10.35 million. Trump sold the second LA home, built in 1981, for $9,500,095 in 2009 for an $850,000 (8%) loss. The second house went back on the market in mid-2016 listed at nearly $30 million.

Trump has licensed his name and image for the development of a number of real estate projects including two Trump-branded real estate projects in Florida that have gone into foreclosure. The Turkish owner of Trump Towers Istanbul, who pays Trump for the use of his name, was reported in December 2015 to be exploring legal means to dissociate the property after the candidate's call to temporarily ban Muslims from entering the United States.

Trump also licensed his name to son-in-law Jared Kushner's 50-story Trump Bay Street, a Jersey City luxury development that has raised $50 million of its $200 million capitalization largely from wealthy Chinese nationals who, after making an initial down payment of $500,000 in concert with the government's expedited EB-5 visa program, can usually obtain United States permanent residency for themselves and their families after two years. Trump is a partner with Kushner Properties only in name licensing and not in the building's financing.

In 2012, the 1290 Avenue of the Americas skyscraper in Manhattan was refinanced; Trump had a 30% stake in the building. The refinancing led to $211 million of debt being accrued with the state-owned Bank of China. This was the first instance of a Chinese bank engaging in commercial mortgage-backed securities in the United States. The Bank of China sold the debt in 2012 into the market, and thus no longer had "any ownership interest in that loan" thereafter, it stated. A 2017 document filed in New York City erroneously listed the Bank of China as a current creditor due to a mistake by loan servicer organization Wells Fargo.

=== Golf courses ===
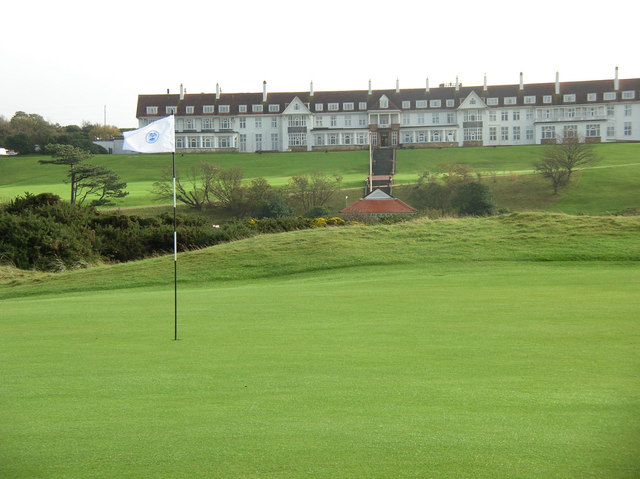
Turnberry Hotel in South Ayrshire, Scotland

The Trump Organization operates many golf courses and resorts in the United States and around the world. The number of golf courses that Trump owns or manages is about 18, according to Golfweek. Trump's personal financial disclosure with the Federal Election Commission stated that his golf and resort revenue for the year 2015 was roughly $382 million.

In 2006, Trump bought the Menie Estate in Balmedie, Aberdeenshire, Scotland, creating a golf resort against the wishes of local residents on an area designated as a Site of Special Scientific Interest. A 2011 independent documentary, You've Been Trumped, by British filmmaker Anthony Baxter, chronicled the golf resort's construction and the subsequent struggles between the locals and Donald Trump. In December 2015, Trump's appeal objecting to an offshore windfarm (Aberdeen Bay Wind Farm) within sight of the golf links was denied. Despite Trump's promises of 6,000 jobs, in 2016, by his own admission, the golf course has created only 200 jobs. In June 2019, Scottish Natural Heritage ruled that the golf course had "destroyed" the sand dune system, causing permanent habitat loss, and recommended that the SSSI status be revoked. The special status was removed in December 2020.

In April 2014, Trump purchased the Turnberry hotel and golf resort in Ayrshire, Scotland, which was a regular fixture in the Open Championship rota. After the 2021 United States Capitol attack, the organizer of the championship, The R&A, announced that The Open would not be held again at Turnberry as long as its links to the Trump Organization remained.

== Professional sports ==
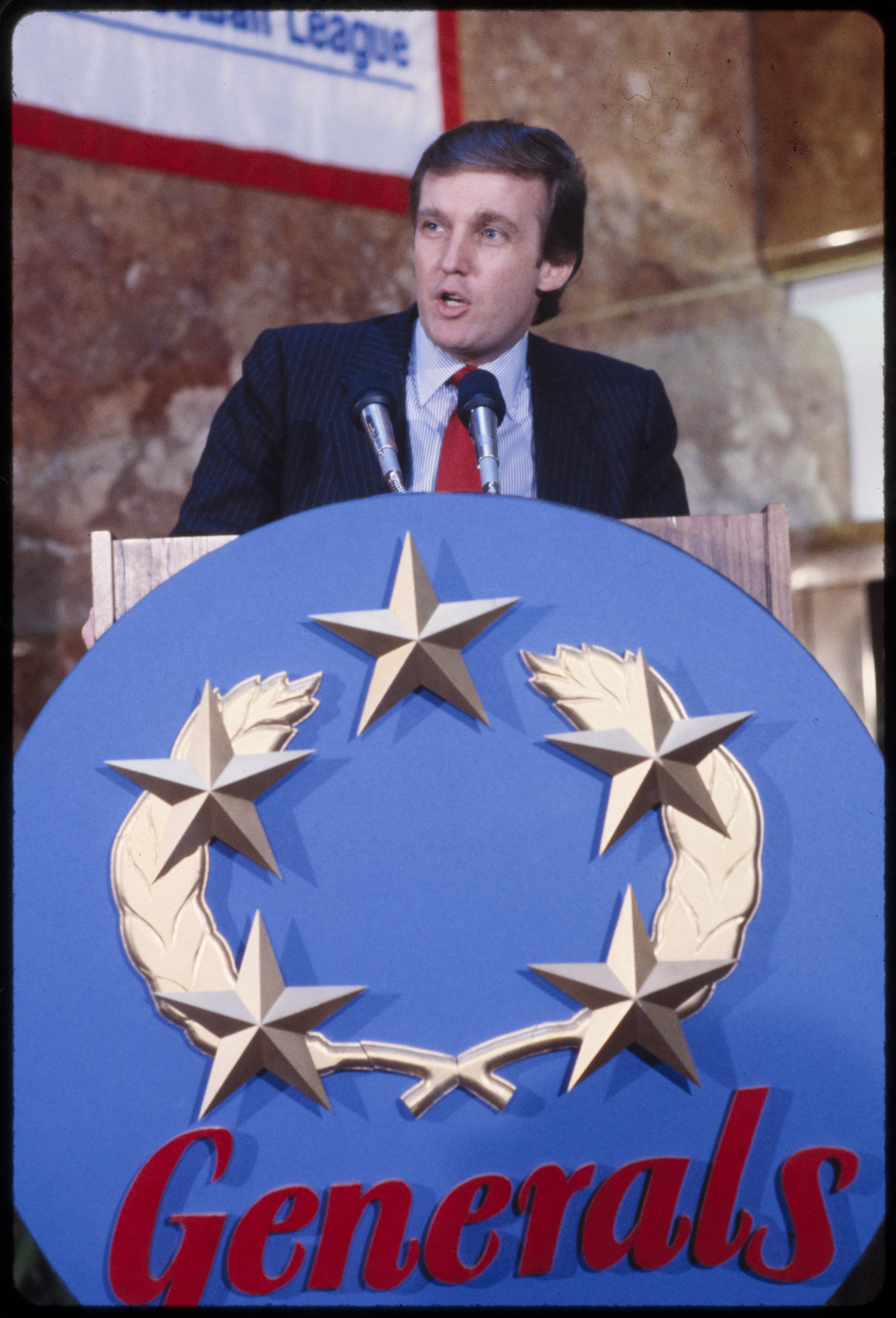
Trump delivers remarks at a press conference for the New Jersey Generals in 1985.

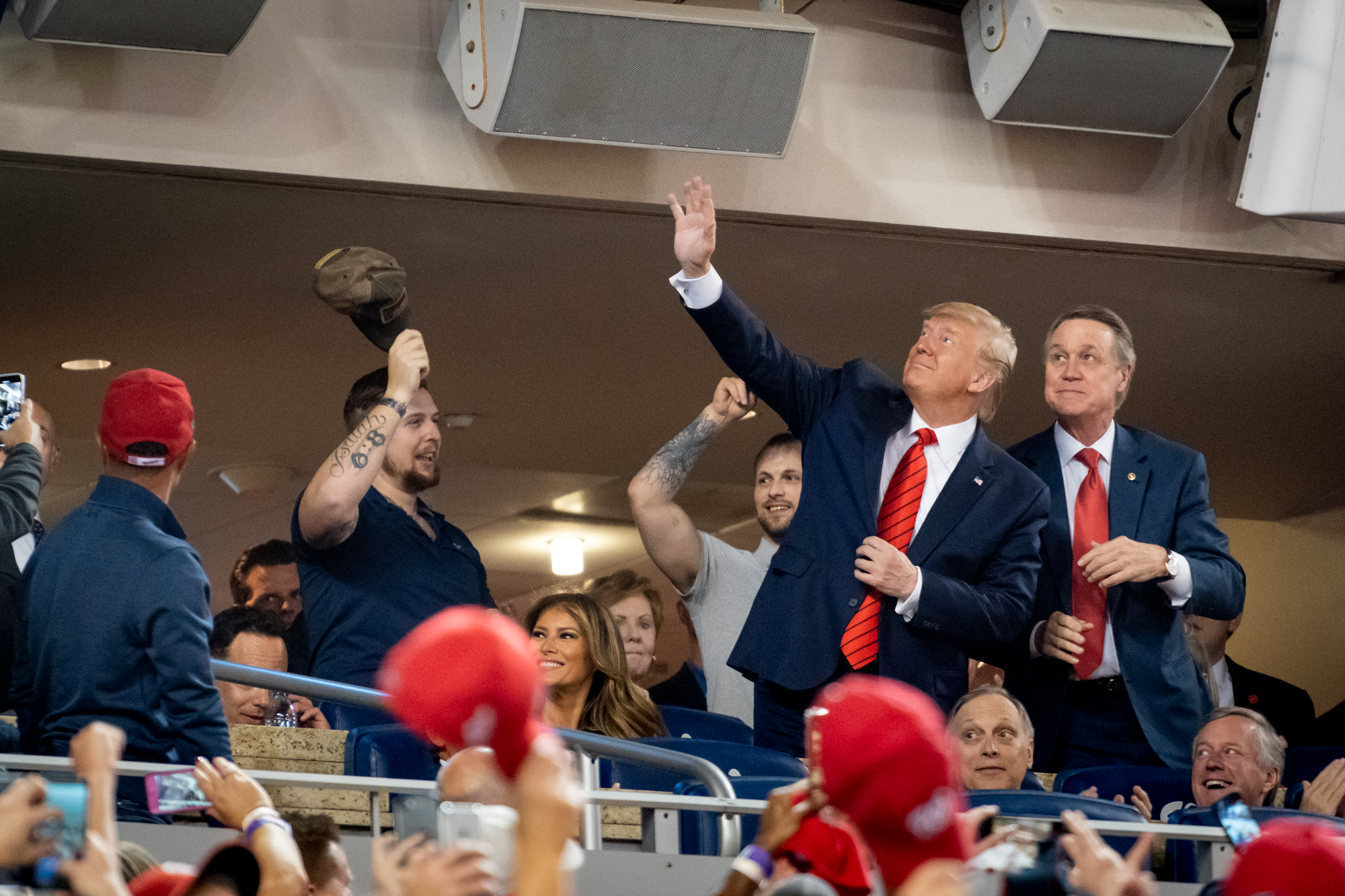
President Donald J. Trump waves to the crowd during Game 5 of the MLB World Series between the Washington Nationals and the Houston Astros Sunday, Oct. 27, 2019, at Nationals Park in Washington, D.C.

In 1983, Trump's New Jersey Generals became a charter member of the new United States Football League (USFL). Before the inaugural season began in 1983, Trump sold the franchise to Oklahoma oil magnate J. Walter Duncan, and bought it back after the season. He then attempted to hire longtime Miami Dolphins coach Don Shula, but the deal fell apart because he was unwilling to meet Shula's demand for an apartment in Trump Tower. Trump ended up hiring former New York Jets coach Walt Michaels. The USFL played its first three seasons during the spring and summer, but Trump convinced the majority of the owners of other USFL teams to move the USFL 1986 schedule to the fall, directly opposite the National Football League (NFL), arguing that it would eventually force a merger with the NFL, which would supposedly increase their investment significantly.

Before the 1985 season, Trump signed Heisman Trophy-winning quarterback Doug Flutie to a $7 million 5-year personal-services contract. That made Flutie the highest-paid pro football player at the time, as well as the highest-paid rookie in any professional sport. After the season, the Generals merged with the Houston Gamblers. Trump owned 50% of the newly merged team, which would stay in New Jersey and retain the Generals nickname. At the time, Trump boasted "it's probably the best team in football." (New Jersey and Houston both had good but not great seasons in 1985: they each made the playoffs but lost first-round games.)

The Generals never played another game. The 1986 season was cancelled after the USFL won a pyrrhic victory in an antitrust lawsuit against the NFL: the NFL technically lost the suit, but the USFL was awarded just $3.00 in cash damages. The USFL, which was down to just 7 active franchises from a high of 18, folded soon afterward.

Trump had expressed an interest in purchasing the Cleveland Indians for $13 million in a February 15, 1983 letter sent by Kenneth Molloy to team president Gabe Paul. Trump increased his offer to $34 million later that same year. His lack of commitment to keep the franchise in Cleveland beyond three years cost him any chance of completing the acquisition.

Trump remained involved with other sports after the Generals folded, operating golf courses in several countries. He also hosted several boxing matches in Atlantic City at the Trump Plaza, including Mike Tyson's 1988 fight against Michael Spinks, and at one time acted as a financial advisor for Tyson.

In 1988, Trump bought a thoroughbred racehorse named "D.J. Trump" for $500,000 who was trained by Allen Jerkens. The horse never raced due to a viral infection and developed serious leg problems. The vets performed a drastic procedure to help its hooves grow back, but it could never race. The horse died three years later in 1991.

In 1989 and 1990, Trump lent his name to the Tour de Trump cycling stage race which was an attempt to create an American equivalent of European races such as the Tour de France or the Giro d'Italia. The name was suggested by his business partner, basketball commentator Billy Packer, who originally planned to call the race the Tour de Jersey. The first stage of the inaugural race ended in the college town of New Paltz, New York where picketers greeted the riders with anti-Trump signs. The second stage began in New York City, and Mayor Ed Koch, who had denounced Trump as "one of the great hucksters", boycotted the event. The last stage of the 10-stage 837-mile race was even more controversial. Going into the last stage, Belgian rider Eric Vanderaerden was favored to win the tour championship, but lost at least 1 minute 20 seconds when he took a wrong turn on a poorly marked course in Atlantic City, riding a quarter-mile or more out of his way. He ended up finishing third overall, behind tour winner Dag-Otto Lauritzen (a Norwegian rider with the American-owned 7-Eleven team) and runner-up Henk Lubberding, who also took a wrong turn during the last stage. Trump withdrew his sponsorship after the second Tour de Trump in 1990 because his other business ventures were experiencing financial woes. The race continued for several more years as the Tour DuPont.

Trump submitted a stalking-horse bid on the Buffalo Bills when it came up for sale following Ralph Wilson's death in 2014; he was ultimately outbid, as he expected, and Kim and Terrence Pegula won the auction. During his 2016 presidential run, he was critical of the NFL's updated concussion rules, complaining on the campaign trail that the game has been made "soft" and "weak", saying a concussion is just "a ding on the head." He accused referees of throwing penalty flags needlessly just to be seen on television "so their wives see them at home."

In 2012, Scottish soccer club Rangers was in financial turmoil, leading to its liquidation and refounding. Trump considered buying the club, before backing out due to the extent of its financial issues.

== Beauty pageants ==
From 1996 until 2015, when he sold his interests, Trump owned part or all of the Miss Universe, Miss USA, and Miss Teen USA beauty pageants.

Miss Universe debuted on CBS, and both Miss Universe and Miss USA moved to NBC in 2002. In 2012, Trump won a $5 million arbitration award against a contestant who claimed the show was rigged. In 2015, NBC and Univision both ended their business relationships with the Miss Universe Organization during Trump's presidential campaign. Trump later announced that he had become the sole owner of the Miss Universe Organization by purchasing NBC's stake. He sold his own interests in the pageant shortly afterwards, to WME/IMG.

In 1999, a few years after buying into Miss Universe, Trump founded a modeling company, Trump Model Management, which operates in the SoHo neighborhood of Lower Manhattan. Together with another Trump company, Trump Management Group LLC, Trump Model Management has brought hundreds of foreign fashion models into the United States to work in the fashion industry since 2000. This business and the beauty pageants overlapped somewhat, with various pageant contestants getting modelling contracts.

== Trump University ==
Trump University LLC was an American for-profit education company that ran a real estate training program from 2005 until at least 2010. After multiple lawsuits, it is now defunct. It was founded by Donald Trump and his associates, Michael Sexton and Jonathan Spitalny. The company offered courses in real estate, asset management, entrepreneurship, and wealth creation, charging between $1,500 and $35,000 per course. In 2005 the operation was notified by New York State authorities that its use of the word "university" violated state law. After a second such notification in 2010, the name of the operation was changed to the "Trump Entrepreneurial Institute". Trump was also found personally liable for failing to obtain a business license for the operation.

In 2013 the state of New York filed a $40 million civil suit claiming that Trump University made false claims and defrauded consumers. In addition, two class-action civil lawsuits relating to Trump University were filed in federal court; they named Donald Trump personally as well as his companies. All three cases were settled in November 2016, after Trump's election to the presidency, for a total of $25 million.

Trump repeatedly criticized a judge, Gonzalo P. Curiel, who is overseeing two of the Trump University cases. During campaign speeches and interviews up until June 2016, Trump called Curiel a "hater of Donald Trump", saying his rulings have been unfair, and that Curiel "happens to be, we believe, Mexican, which is great. I think that's fine", while suggesting that the judge's ethnicity posed a conflict of interest in light of Trump's proposal to build a wall on the United States–Mexican border. Many legal experts were critical of Trump's attacks on Curiel, often viewing them as racially charged, unfounded, and an affront to the concept of an independent judiciary. On June 7, 2016, Trump issued a lengthy statement saying that his criticism of the judge had been "misconstrued" and that his concerns about Curiel's impartiality were not based upon ethnicity alone, but also upon rulings in the case.

== ACN, Inc. ==
From 2005 to 2015, Trump was paid $8.8 million for promoting multi-level marketing telecommunications company ACN Inc. and its products on ACN's website, promotional DVDs and at their events, and on his The Apprentice reality-TV show.

In 2018, four investors filed a federal civil lawsuit in the Southern District of New York against Donald Trump and his children Donald Jr., Ivanka, and Eric for fraud and racketeering. In July 2019, a district judge permitted the lawsuit to proceed with state-level claims of fraud, false advertising, and unfair competition. The Trumps were accused of not having disclosed that they were being paid by ACN when they recommended the company as a sound investment. As part of the discovery process, the Trumps were ordered in March 2020 to provide information from Trump Organization business records back to 2005.

In April 2020, a federal judge ordered MGM, the majority owner of Celebrity Apprentice, to release unaired tapes of two episodes of the show to the attorneys of plaintiffs who accused the four Trumps of misleading them to invest in ACN; in the episodes, celebrity contestants competed to produce commercials for an ACN product. The Trumps appealed the ruling and unsuccessfully sought to deal with the dispute via arbitration. In November 2021, a federal judge ordered MGM to make the tapes available to the plaintiffs' attorneys at a secure location.

Trump and his children were deposed in 2022. In May 2023, the plaintiffs withdrew their claims against the children in order to "streamline the dispute ahead of a trial". The trial is scheduled for January 29, 2024.

== Donald J. Trump Foundation ==
The Donald J. Trump Foundation was a U.S.-based private foundation established in 1988 for the initial purpose of giving away proceeds from the book Trump: The Art of the Deal by Trump and Tony Schwartz. The foundation's funds mostly came from donors other than Trump, whose last personal contribution to the charity was in 2008. The top donors to the foundation from 2004 to 2014 were Vince and Linda McMahon of World Wrestling Entertainment, who donated $5 million to the foundation after Trump appeared at WrestleMania in 2007.

Per the foundation's tax returns, its benefactors included healthcare and sports-related charities, as well as conservative groups. In 2009, for example, the foundation gave $926,750 to about 40 groups, with the biggest donations going to the Arnold Palmer Medical Center Foundation ($100,000), the New York Presbyterian Hospital ($125,000), the Police Athletic League ($156,000), and the Clinton Foundation ($100,000).

Starting in 2016 The Washington Post began reporting on how the foundation raised and granted money. The Post uncovered several potential legal and ethical violations, such as alleged self-dealing and possible tax evasion. The New York State attorney general is investigating the foundation "to make sure it is complying with the laws governing charities in New York." A Trump spokesman called the investigation a "partisan hit job". On October 3, 2016, the New York attorney general's office notified the Trump Foundation that it was in violation of New York laws regarding charities and ordered it to immediately cease its fundraising activities in the state of New York. The foundation, which had also admitted to engaging in self-dealing on its 2015 IRS form, agreed to this order.

A 2018 suit by the New York State attorney general alleged that Trump had illegally used foundation funds to buy self-portraits, pay off his businesses' legal obligations, and boost his presidential campaign. The judge ruled against the Donald J. Trump Foundation and ordered Trump to pay $2 million in damages. Trump agreed to give that money and the foundation's remaining $1.8 million to 8 charities ranging from Army Emergency Relief to the United Negro College Fund to the US Holocaust Memorial Museum and to dissolve the foundation.

== Branding and licensing ==
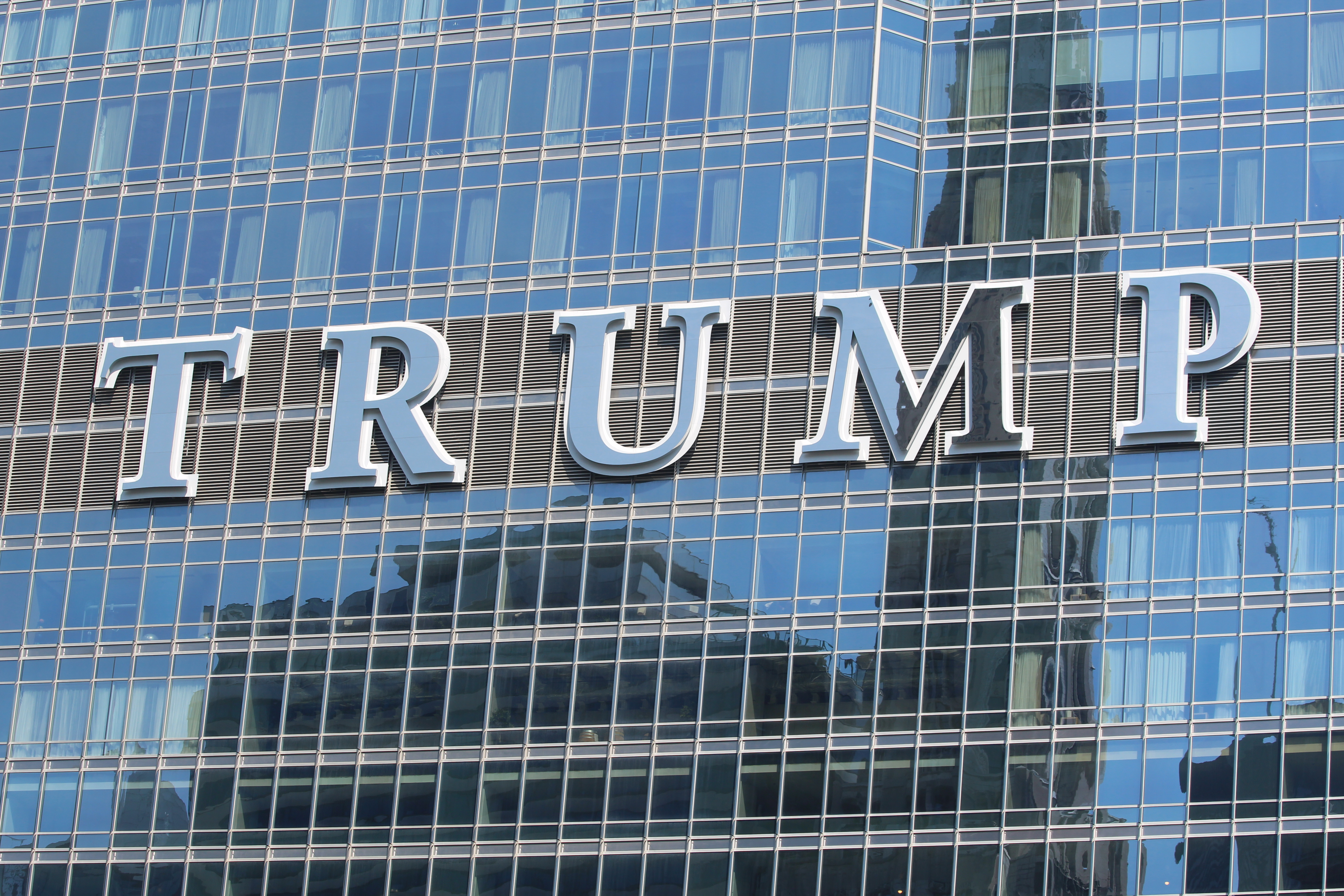
Trump International Hotel and Tower

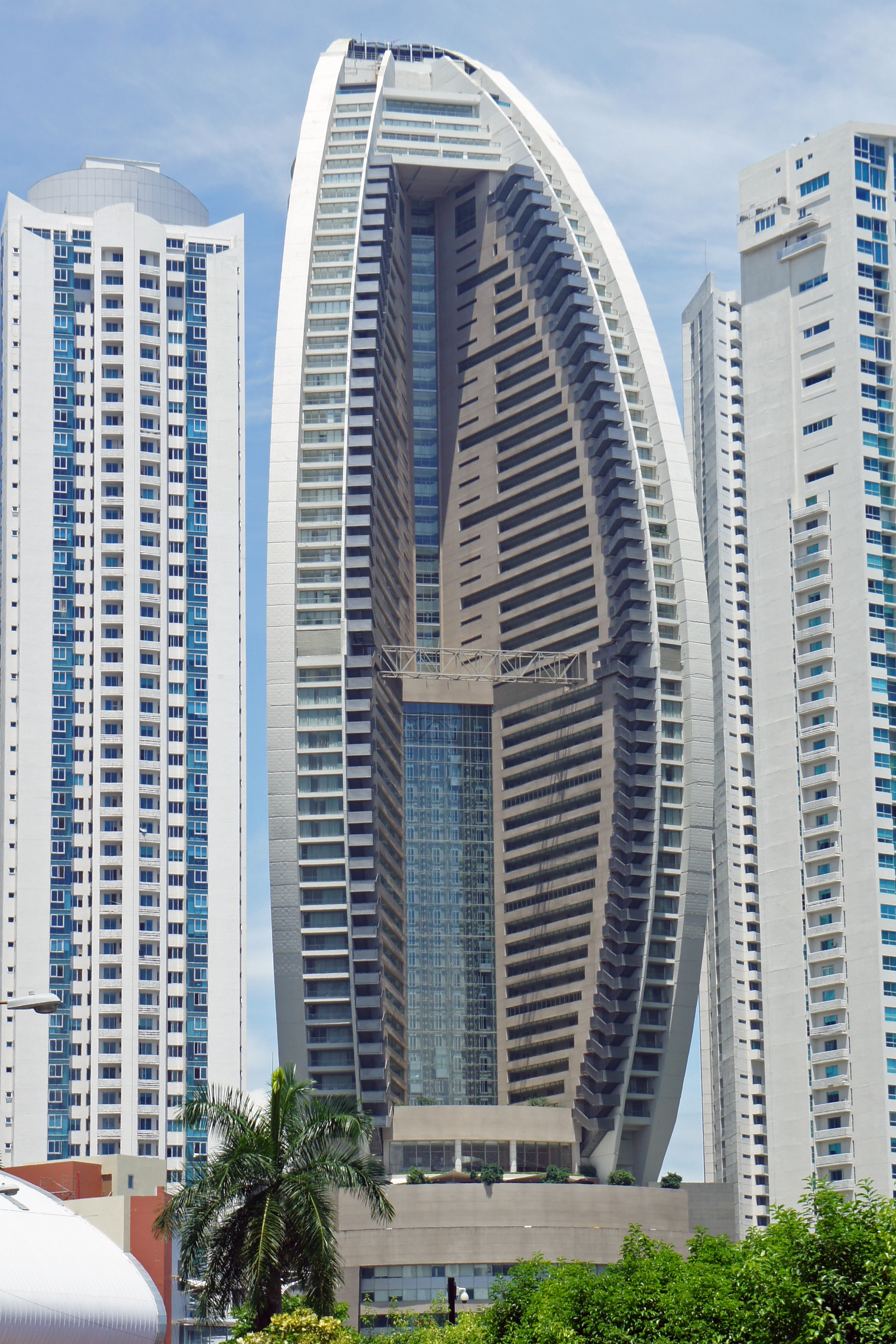
The Trump Ocean Club International Hotel and Tower (center) in Panama City, Panama

Trump has marketed his name on a large number of building projects as well as commercial products and services, achieving mixed success doing so for himself, his partners, and investors in the projects. (Note: His external entrepreneurial and investment ventures include Trump Financial (a mortgage firm), Trump Sales and Leasing (residential sales), Trump International Realty (a residential and commercial real estate brokerage firm), The Trump Entrepreneur Initiative (a for profit business education company, formerly called the Trump University), Trump Restaurants (located in Trump Tower and consisting of Trump Buffet, Trump Catering, Trump Ice Cream Parlor, and Trump Bar), GoTrump (an online travel search engine), Select By Trump (a line of coffee drinks), Trump Drinks (an energy drink for the Israeli and Palestinian markets) Donald J. Trump Signature Collection (a line of menswear, men's accessories, and watches), Donald Trump The Fragrance (2004), SUCCESS by Donald Trump (a second fragrance launched by The Trump Organization and the Five Star Fragrance Company released in March 2012), Trump Ice bottled water, the former Trump Magazine, Trump Golf, Trump Chocolate, Trump Home (home furnishings), Trump Productions (a television production company), Trump Institute, Trump: The Game (1989 board game with a 2004 re-release version tied to The Apprentice), Donald Trump's Real Estate Tycoon (a business simulation video game), Trump Books, Trump Model Management, Trump Shuttle, Trump Mortgage, Trump Network (a multi-level vitamin, cosmetic, and urinalysis marketing company), Trump Vodka, Trump Steakhouse and Trump Steaks. In addition, Trump reportedly received $1.5 million for each one-hour presentation he did for The Learning Annex. Trump also endorsed ACN Inc., a multi-level marketing telecommunications company. He has spoken at ACN International Training Events at which he praised the company's founders, business model and video phone. He earned a total $1.35 million for three speeches given for the company, amounting to $450,000 per speech.) In 2011, Forbes' financial experts estimated the value of the Trump brand at $200 million. Trump disputed this valuation, saying his brand was worth about $3 billion.

Many developers pay Trump to market their properties and to be the public face for their projects. For that reason, Trump does not own many of the buildings that display his name. According to Forbes, this portion of Trump's empire, actually run by his children, is by far his most valuable, having a $562 million valuation. According to Forbes, there are 33 licensing projects under development including seven "condo hotels" (the seven Trump International Hotel and Tower developments). In June 2015, Forbes pegged the Trump brand at $125 million as retailers like Macy's Inc. and Serta Mattresses began dropping Trump-branded products.

The value of the Trump brand may have fallen due to his presidential campaign. After his 2016 campaign started, an internal Young & Rubicam study of Trump's brand among high-income consumers showed "plummeting" ratings for traits such as "prestigious", "upper class", and "glamorous" at the end of 2015, suggesting that Trump's various businesses could face market difficulties and financing challenges in the future. Some consumers say they are avoiding purchasing Trump-branded products and services as a protest against Trump and his campaign. Bookings and foot traffic at Trump-branded hotels and casinos fell off sharply in 2016, primarily driven by a decrease in visits to the properties by women. Following the release of the Access Hollywood tape recordings in October 2016, the value of the Trump brand was reported to have taken a further hit, with estimates of the reduction in the brand's added value of up to 13 percentage points.

In March 2024, Trump began promoting the $60 God Bless the U.S.A. Bible, which features a King James translation of the Bible; the U.S. Constitution, Bill of Rights, Declaration of Independence, and Pledge of Allegiance; as well as the handwritten chorus of the Lee Greenwood song God Bless the U.S.A.. The website selling the Bible bills it as "the only Bible endorsed by" Trump and that his "name, likeness and image" are being used under paid license from one of Trump's organizations, CIC Ventures LLC.

== Stocks, bonds, funds, and similar holdings ==
DJT stock price reached over $79 per share after its public offering, but declined thereafter.

Since its public offering, Trump Media & Technology Group Corp. has had net operating losses.

After a brief initial rise, the market price of the $Trump meme coin declined. A Chainalysis study concluded that through the middle of 2025, 58 investors had made profits exceeding $10 million each—mostly early traders who got out before the price decline. Through June 2026, 988,905 wallets lost a total of $3.81 billion while Trump profited $636 million.

Most of Donald Trump's 2025 revenue was derived from his businesses' cryptocurrency ventures.

Trump's personal financial market investment portfolio is concentrated in the financial and commodities markets. The investment portfolio generates income and cash flow from a variety of mechanisms as dividends, capital gains, and compounded carried interest. He invested a minimum of $70 million in stocks. Though real estate is still his most preferred asset class, Trump became an active financial market investor in 2011 following disappointment from the depressed American real estate market and various investments in the Federal Reserve's interest yields on CDs were next to nothing. Trump stated that he was not enthusiastic to be a stock market investor, but that prime real estate at good prices was hard to find at that time and that stocks and equity securities were cheap and generating good cash flow from dividends. He profited from 40 of the 45 stocks he purchased which he sold in 2014, making it almost a 90% success rate in capital appreciation in addition to millions in earned dividends. The biggest gainers in his stock portfolio were Bank of America Corporation, The Boeing Company and Facebook, Inc earning a windfall profit of $6.7 million, $3.96 million and $3.85 million, respectively.

Trump's stock portfolio was valued somewhere between $33.4 million and $87.9 million in 2015 and was invested in many sectors, including public companies such as tobacco distributors, retail outlets, pharmaceutical companies, industrial manufacturing companies, financial conglomerates, oil companies, high technology firms and defense contractors. Public stock investments within his portfolio include General Electric, Chevron, UPS, Coca-Cola, Home Depot, Comcast, Sanofi, Ford, ConocoPhillips, Energy Transfer Partners, Altera, Verizon Communications, Procter & Gamble, Bank of America, Nike, Google, Apple Inc., Philip Morris, Citigroup, Morgan Stanley, Whole Foods, Intel, IBM, Bristol-Myers Squibb, Johnson & Johnson, Caterpillar, Kinder Morgan, AT&T and Facebook. He has at least $78 million invested in a variety of paper assets such as stocks, bonds, mutual funds, private equity funds, fund of funds, and hedge funds. His financial market investment accounts are kept at JPMorgan, Barclays, Deutsche Bank and Oppenheimer. His Barclays account includes investments in 32 entities and cash worth between $49,021 and $396,001 and having stock in two accounts at Deutsche Bank that contain cash, treasury bills, and stock in 173 entities. His investment account with Oppenheimer contains cash and has 31 positions worth between $10,380,031 and $33,301,000. His account with JPMorgan contains stock in 60 firms valued between $1,251,008 and $2,617,000.

Trump has also invested in funds that focus on middle and smaller sized businesses such as Tesla Motors, the electric car maker and has invested internationally in a number of emerging market, growth and hedge funds located in Europe and Asia. He has also invested in a number of private equity and hedge funds including $1 to $5 million in Advantage Plus, $1 to $5 million in AG Diversified Funds, $2 million in MidOcean Credit Opportunities, $4 million in Paulson & Co., and around $5 million with Angelo, Gordon & Co. Trump's biggest fund holding has been in Black Rock's Obsidian Fund, where his stake is estimated to be between $25 million to $50 million. Nearly all of Trump's open end mutual fund investments are concentrated in Baron Capital Management, a mid-sized mutual fund family headed by mutual fund mogul Ronald S. Baron. Trump invested $16.2 million in Baron Capital Management, making him a significant minority shareholder. He revealed that he earned over $22 million with his private equity, hedge fund, and mutual fund investments and generated between $1.5 million and $10 million in income almost all of it from investments such as dividends, capital gains, and carried interest. Trump also has a portion of his portfolio invested in U.S. Treasury bonds.

On a government form submitted in 2015, Trump reported holding an amount of physical gold, valued at between $100,001 to $250,000.

== Taxes and income ==
Trump's net worth over time, as estimated by Forbes magazine

Trump released some financial information in 2015, but declined to publicly release any of his full tax returns, though he said he would do so before the 2016 election if what his attorneys described as an ongoing audit by the Internal Revenue Service (IRS) was completed covering tax returns for the years 2009 through 2016. According to a July 2015 press release from his campaign manager, Trump's "income" for the year 2014 was $362 million ("which does not include dividends, interest, capital gains, rents and royalties"). His disclosure filings for the year 2015 stated that his total gross revenue was in excess of $611 million.

Fortune magazine has reported that the $362 million figure as stated on his Federal Election Commission (FEC) filings is not "income" but gross revenue before salaries, interest payments on outstanding debt, and other business-related expenses; Trump's net income was "most likely" about one-third of that. According to public records, Trump received a $302 New York tax rebate in 2013 (and in two other recent years) given to couples earning less than $500,000 per year, who submit as proof their federal tax returns. Trump's campaign manager has suggested that Trump's tax rebate was an error.

In October 2016, it was revealed that Trump had claimed a loss of $916 million on his 1995 tax returns. As tax losses from one year can be applied to offset income from future years, the $916 million loss allowed him to reduce or eliminate his taxable income (and consequently his US federal income taxes) during the eighteen-year carry forward period. Trump acknowledged he used the loss but declined to provide details such as the specific years the loss was applied.

An investigative story by the New York Times found that in the early 1990s in order to avoid "financial ruin" Trump's businesses used methods which were "legally dubious" to avoid paying taxes, and that Trump's own lawyers described these activities as "improper". Independent tax experts stated that "Whatever loophole existed was not 'exploited' here, but stretched beyond any recognition" and that it involved "sleight of hand". Since the taxes were related to the reduction in Trump's extensive junk bond debt at the time and the bankruptcies of three of Trump's casinos, the methods used were probably related, according to the report, to Trump's reported $916 million loss reported on his 1995 tax return.

== See also ==
- Annual financial disclosures of Donald Trump
- Business projects of Donald Trump in Russia
- Media career of Donald Trump

== Works cited ==
- Blair, Gwenda (2015b) [2001]. The Trumps: Three Generations That Built an Empire. Simon & Schuster. ISBN 978-1-5011-3936-9.
- Kranish, Michael; Fisher, Marc (2016). Trump Revealed: An American Journey of Ambition, Ego, Money, and Power. Simon and Schuster. ISBN 9781508226758. "His new agency, originally conceived as Trump Models Inc., ended up with the name T Models..."
- O'Donnell, James R. (1991). Trumped! The Inside Story of the Real Donald Trump, His Cunning Rise and Spectacular Fall. Simon & Schuster. ISBN 978-0-671-73735-1.
