= Judge Molloy =

Judge Molloy may refer to:

- Donald W. Molloy (born 1946), judge of the United States District Court for the District of Montana
- Kenneth Molloy (1919–1999), judge on the New York State Supreme Court
- Robert A. Molloy (born 1975), judge of the District Court of the Virgin Islands and of the United States Virgin Islands Superior Court
