= Trump: The Game =

Board game

- 2004 box cover
- Publishers: Milton Bradley Company (1989 version); Parker Brothers (2004 version)
- Publication: May 1989; 37 years ago July 2004; 22 years ago (rerelease)
- Languages: English
- Players: 3–4

Trump: The Game is a board game depicting Donald Trump. Milton Bradley Company initially released the game in 1989, but it sold only 800,000 copies out of an expected two million. Parker Brothers re-released Trump: The Game in 2004 following the success of Trump's reality television series, The Apprentice, from earlier that year. Trump: The Game received mixed reviews from critics.

== History ==
=== Pre-release ===
Jeffrey Breslow pitched the game to Donald Trump in his office at Trump Tower in New York. As Breslow explained the concept, Trump interrupted to say, "I like it—what's next?" Trump received offers from four toy companies that were interested in releasing the game. Trump chose Milton Bradley Company, which he called "the Rolls-Royce of game companies." Parker Brothers declined an offer to produce the game. After receiving approval from Trump, Breslow sold the concept for the game to Milton Bradley and then held another meeting with Trump to discuss how their profits would be split. Breslow initially suggested splitting the profits equally, but according to him, Trump replied, "I don't do 50–50." Trump received 60 percent of the profits to Breslow's 40 percent. Breslow said, "The game wasn't sellable without Donald Trump. He could have squeezed me for even 80–20. He knew he was in the driver's seat." Breslow requested that Trump promote the game at the American International Toy Fair and at the Milton Bradley factory, which Trump agreed to do.

Trump: The Game was unveiled during an event at Trump Tower on February 7, 1989. The game was expected to retail for $25. Trump said at the event that his undisclosed percentage of the game's revenue would be donated to charities that benefited cerebral palsy and AIDS research, as well as help for homeless people. Milton Bradley executives, who had worked with Trump for more than a year on the game, were surprised as they had not been aware of Trump's charitable intentions. The game was patterned after Monopoly, and based on Trump's career and his 1987 book, The Art of the Deal. Trump, who received input in developing the game with Milton Bradley game specialists, said, "I didn't want a game based solely on chance. I wanted a game based on talent. And I wanted to teach people if they have business instincts. It's great if they can learn that from a game instead of having to go out and lose your shirt." Trump also said, "I really like the game. It's much more sophisticated than Monopoly, which I've played all my life." George Ditomassi, the president of Milton Bradley at the time, declined to specify how much money the company paid Trump to name the game after him, although Ditomassi estimated that the game's donated proceeds would total $20 million.

At the time of its announcement, there was speculation as to whether Trump: The Game could have an effect on sales of Monopoly and other board games. Phil Orbanes, senior vice president of research and development for Parker Brothers, said that Trump's game "is not the kind of thing you want to pull out on the spur of the moment when grandma comes over. It can leave you exhausted and feeling like you don't want to play again. As accurate as it may be at capturing the feeling of insecurity in the real world, the game doesn't give you a feel-good experience, which is the purpose most people rely on for playing games." Breslow, who had no faith that the game would become as popular as Monopoly, later said that a "huge percentage" of Trump board games "were never taken out of the box. It was bought as a gift item, a novelty, a curiosity. Trump got that. He had zero interest in how the game played."

In March 1989, Vegas World casino owner Bob Stupak challenged Trump to play a round of Trump: The Game, with Stupak wagering a $1 million bet. Trump declined, saying, "It's always possible to lose, even for someone who's used to winning." Stupak then ran full-page ads in the New York Post and The Press of Atlantic City that publicly challenged Trump to play the game with him. Trump did not accept the challenge.

=== Release ===
Trump: The Game was launched in May 1989, with the tagline, "It's not whether you win or lose, it's whether you win!" Trump appeared in a television commercial for the game. Trump and Milton Bradley hoped the game would sell two million copies, although the game ultimately sold poorly. By August 1990, Trump acknowledged that the game may have been too complicated. The rulebook was more than 12 pages long. Trump said the game had sold 800,000 units.

Ditomassi said about the game's failure, "The game was just nailed to the shelf." Ditomassi felt that one reason for the game's poor sales was that it had the Trump name and customers were unaware of its revenue being partially donated to charity: "They felt perhaps this was going to be something that a millionaire would make some money on." The game's television commercial was changed to include a new voice-over which stated: "Mr. Trump's proceeds from Trump: The Game will be donated to charity." However, sales of the game failed to increase. It was also believed that sales suffered because the game was misleadingly marketed as a Monopoly knockoff. Analysts also believed that the public had grown tired of Trump. Orbanes said that games such as Trump: The Game "were too heavily involved with what appeared to be high-level finance. That's too intimidating to most people."

In May 1991, Trump won a lawsuit brought against him by Stuart Ross, a Manhattan attorney who said he had been hired to serve as an agent in licensing the game. Ross said he had suggested the idea of a board game to Trump, and that he was promised 25 percent of the game's royalties. Ross had sought $200,000 in the lawsuit. Trump had testified that he never made a contract with Ross, and that the game's royalties—$866,800—had already been donated to charity after being deposited with the Donald J. Trump Foundation, although he did not provide records to prove his claim.

=== Re-release ===
In July 2004, Parker Brothers (now a subsidiary of Hasbro with Milton Bradley after being acquired in 1991) re-released Trump: The Game, after the success of Trump's new reality television series, The Apprentice. The updated version of the game implemented Trump's signature catchphrase from the series: "You're fired!" The re-released version, priced at $25, featured somewhat-simplified rules, cards with business tips for the player, and an updated box cover featuring a sterner-looking Donald Trump. The new game's tagline was, "It Takes Brains to Make Millions. It Takes Trump to Make Billions." Hasbro expected stronger sales for the re-release, especially during the 2004 Christmas shopping season.

On August 18, 2004, Trump held an official unveiling ceremony for the new game at Trump Tower in New York. To promote the game, Trump selected five people from the audience at the event to "enter the golden money machine and grab as much Trump money as they can in 15 seconds," with the winner receiving a free vacation to the Trump Taj Mahal resort in Atlantic City, New Jersey. Although Breslow felt that the re-release was a superior version to the original, he said that the game did not sell well.

In June 2016, during Trump's presidential campaign, The Huffington Post reported that Trump's claim of donating the board game's revenue to charity could not be substantiated. Trump, The Trump Organization, and Hasbro declined to comment. As of 2016, the game is considered a collector's item.

== Gameplay ==
Trump: The Game is played with three to four players, who must buy and sell various properties in an attempt to make money. The winner is the player who has the most money at the end of the game, after all properties have been purchased. In the 1989 version, the board consists of eight properties and six different spaces, while the 2004 version consists of seven properties and five spaces. The game features a total of eight different types of cards, including five profit cards.

=== Equipment ===
The following equipment was included with the game:

1989 version

- 72 Trump cards
- 4 "T" pawns
- 1 die
- 8 Property boxes
- $10 million bills
- $50 million bills
- $100 million bills

2004 version

- 60 Trump cards
- 4 "T" pawns
- 2 dice
- 7 Property boxes
- $10 million bills
- $50 million bills
- $100 million bills

== Reception ==
In the November 1989 edition of the British magazine Games International (Issue 10), Brian Walker admired the production values, saying, "The production and component quality is absolutely first class and of a standard not normally associated with American family games." Walker did admit that the part of the game that required players to negotiate deals "might not appeal to players who like to have the game system do everything for them." However, he concluded by giving the game an above average rating of 4 out of 5, saying, "Certainly Trump is a must for anyone who likes interactive business games and crushing opponents."

In 2011, Time magazine listed the game among the "Top 10 Donald Trump Failures," referring to it as one of Trump's "ridiculous ideas."

Trump's rise to political prominence in 2015 led to a re-examination of the game with mixed reviews:

- Fortune included the game on a list of five Trump "business fumbles."
- Mother Jones magazine, which wrote that Monopoly was a superior game, gave a negative review of the 2004 version, calling it, "Cramped and short-lived—it's the Trump Shuttle of board games. This is a great game if you don't have very many friends." The magazine wrote that "the game's flaws—its erratic nature, its contradictions, its singular obsession with the rapid accumulation of wealth for the purpose of acquiring luxury real estate and firing people—are also Trump's flaws," while also noting that Trump "basically took Monopoly money, stuck his face on it, and added a bunch of zeroes."
- Christopher Chabris of The Wall Street Journal described the 1989 edition as "surprisingly fun to play, as long as you don't mind seeing the candidate's face on $100 million bills and moving a T-shaped pawn around a black-and-gold board." However, Chabris felt that there were better business-themed board games available such as Power Grid.
- The Chicago Tribune also considered the game to have been a failure.
- Business Insider called the 1989 version "bizarre." Ben Guarino of Inverse wrote, "The game is designed to simulate what it's like to be rich. In a very specific, very Trumpian way, it succeeds."

== See also ==
- Donald Trump's Real Estate Tycoon
