= Bob Stupak =

American casino owner, entrepreneur, and poker player (1942–2009)

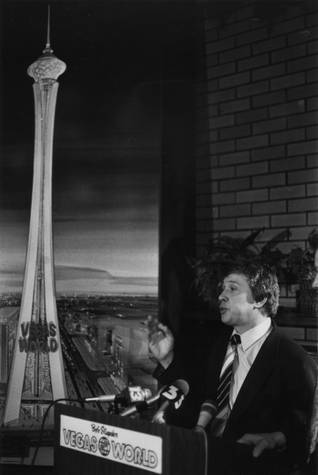
- Nickname: The Polish Maverick
- Born: April 6, 1942; Pittsburgh, Pennsylvania, U.S.
- Died: September 25, 2009 (aged 67); Las Vegas, Nevada, U.S.

World Series of Poker
- Bracelet: 1
- Money finishes: 8

World Poker Tour
- Final table: 1
- Money finishes: 11

Robert Edward Stupak (April 6, 1942 – September 25, 2009) was an entrepreneur who became a Las Vegas casino developer and owner. He was also a poker player, winning titles at the World Series of Poker and the Super Bowl of Poker. He also competed on the World Poker Tour, and various other tournaments, as well as cash games, including High Stakes Poker on GSN. He once played a computer for half a million dollars and won.

== Early life ==
Bob Stupak was the son of Chester and Florence Stupak. He was born in Pittsburgh, Pennsylvania. Chester Stupak ran a dice game called the Lotus Club in Pittsburgh for over 50 years. Stupak as a teenager was mainly interested in motorcycle racing, and once ranked third in the world after breaking a speed record.

== Career ==
Following army service at Fort Knox, Stupak started a coupon book company in 1964, at age 22, offering two-for-one restaurant discounts, which he relocated to Australia in 1965. Stupak moved back to Las Vegas in 1971, where he purchased the Chateau Vegas restaurant near the Las Vegas Convention Center.

Stupak bought a 1.5 acres (0.61 ha) parcel north of Sahara Avenue at Las Vegas Boulevard South. On March 31, 1974, Bob Stupak's World Famous Historic Gambling Museum opened. "The name was about 10 ft (3.0 m) longer than the casino", Stupak recalled years later. On May 21, an air conditioner caught fire and the building burned down.

Two years later, Valley Bank's Perry Thomas loaned Stupak a million dollars to build the original Vegas World on the site of the former gambling museum. In 1979. Stupak opened Bob Stupak's Vegas World hotel and casino known for its promotions and the world's largest sign (which later blew down in a wind storm), and new twists on games, including the world's first quarter million and million dollar jackpot. At its peak in the mid-1980s, Vegas World grossed in excess of $100 million per year.

He bought the Vault casino at 22 Fremont Street in downtown Las Vegas and changed its name to Glitter Gulch, which opened in October 1980. A cowgirl sign above named Sassy Sally, later Vegas Vickie, became well-known as the 1994 mock bride of Vegas Vic sign at the Pioneer Club. The sign (subsequently, above strip club Girls of Glitter Gulch) was dismantled in 2017 for redevelopment of the site, and the 20-foot Vegas Vickie sign was given a new home and namesake cocktail lounge at the new Circa Resort & Casino.

Stupak donated $100,000 to the United Negro College Fund in exchange for a chance to play with Harlem Globetrotters His appearance reportedly made international news. He got his wish and appeared in a Globetrotters game, shooting free throws.

Then, taking a page from Donald Trump with his Trump board game, Stupak came up with his own board game he called Stupak after Trump declined his million dollar challenge for charity playing Trump: The Game.

In 1999, Stupak was among the inaugural inductees to the Casino Legends Hall of Fame.

Stupak's promotions included the first quarter-million-dollar and million-dollar slot machine jackpots in Las Vegas. He also ran a direct-mail marketing program known as the "Vegas Vacation Club," which offered low-cost vacation packages to Vegas World that included accommodations, meals, and casino credits. The program attracted repeat visitors and contributed to consistently high hotel occupancy.

In 1987, Stupak was considering the purchase of a local television station, as well as starting a weekly newspaper. In 1988, Stupak was the chairman of the newly formed Committee for Olympics in Nevada, and advocated for the Summer Olympic Games to be held in Las Vegas in 1996 or in 2000.

In 1989, Stupak won a widely publicized million-dollar wager on Super Bowl XXIII. Later that year, he won the Deuce to Seven Lowball championship bracelet at the World Series of Poker and the Super Bowl of poker at Caesars Palace, both times edging out world-renowned lowball poker legend Billy Baxter for the championship. One of Stupak's most talked about promotions came when he paid a daredevil one million dollars to jump off the top of Vegas World, then charged him a $990,000 landing fee.

In 1990, Stupak approached the mayor and city council with a plan to build the largest free-standing sign in the world. His plan was for an 1,800-foot-tall neon sign that would tower over Las Vegas. Then-Councilman Steve Miller, an airline instructor pilot, convinced Stupak to redesign the structure to include an observation deck. Miller took Stupak for a flight over Vegas World in Miller's private plane. There they circled for over an hour at altitudes ranging from 1,000 to 2,000 feet watching the sun set. Stupak told Miller that to not share such a beautiful sight would be a sin, and he immediately went to work revising his plans to include a restaurant and amusement rides at the top of what was then to be called the "Stupak Tower". Stupak held a press conference and announced his plan with the caveat that his tower would be the icon of Las Vegas, and Steve Wynn's Mirage would be two miles from him, not the other way around. Within a year of Stupak's announcement, the construction on the tower began.

On March 31, 1995, Stupak suffered a motorcycle accident, breaking every bone in his face and going into a coma. Although the initial prognosis was that he would not survive, Stupak's next of kin, son Nevada Stupak, approved a non-FDA-approved experimental drug to reduce the swelling to his head and brain. Stupak recovered, although with lingering health problems.

At the time of his motorcycle crash, Stupak was developing what had become known as Stratosphere Las Vegas, the largest structure west of the Mississippi and a top 10 tallest structure in the world. The accident was only three weeks after Stupak agreed to bring in fellow poker player buddy Lyle Berman and his company Grand Casinos in as investors in the project, in large part due to the $550 million in capital they agreed to invest. This was Grand Casinos' big opportunity to enter the Las Vegas market due in large part to the overwhelming success in the Indian gaming market. Stupak called this the most difficult decision of his life as he had never had a partner and was always sole owner. The tower opened in late April 1996, making it the third most expensive casino development in history at the time. Singer Phyllis McGuire, Stupak's paramour, pronounced the grand opening "a Stupakular night". Two months later, Stupak rolled the final dice at The Sands, on June 30, prior to its demolition that November. Within a year of opening, Stupak was out as chairman of the board, and the project ultimately ended as a financial disaster. Stupak personally lost nearly $200 million. He continued to plan Vegas projects, including a purchase of the Moulin Rouge Hotel and a huge hotel shaped like the RMS Titanic, but these endeavors never bore fruit.

Stupak appeared in the first season of the GSN series High Stakes Poker. He also appeared at a final table during the first season of the World Poker Tour. He starred in an episode of Crime Story in 1987, and made numerous film and television series appearances.

In 1999, he was among the inaugural inductees to the Casino Legends Hall of Fame.

As of 2008, his total live tournament winnings exceeded $865,000. With his World Series of Poker Bracelet in the Deuce to Seven Championship and his wife Sandy in the Casino Owner's Championship at Binion's Horseshoe, they were the first husband-and-wife combo to hold WSOP bracelets.

== Political career ==
Stupak ran for mayor of Las Vegas twice. In 1983, Stupak ran against then-current mayor William H. Briare, as well as six other candidates. Stupak came in second place, with 33.1 percent of the vote, losing to Briare, who attained 62.5 percent and won re-election.

Stupak ran for mayor again in 1987, and clashed often with the media. During the campaign, Stupak released financial documents that indicated his net worth at about $54 million. Stupak almost succeeded in being elected mayor. After defeating a dozen other candidates in the primary, Stupak forced an incumbent city council member into a runoff general election contest. Following what many believed was a tampered vote count, Stupak lost the election.

In 2006, Stupak unsuccessfully ran as a Democrat for Lieutenant Governor of Nevada.

== Personal life ==
While living in Australia for seven years, Stupak was married, briefly, to Annette Suna, and they had a daughter, Nicole. From 1971 to 1985, Stupak was married to Sandra Joyce Wilkinson (later, Sandy Blumen), and had two more children, Nevada and Summer. During the 1990s, Stupak was romantically linked to Phyllis McGuire of the McGuire Sisters.

In August 2000 he got into an altercation with R. D. Matthews, who slapped Stupak in the face during a disagreement over Becky Binion's management of the Horseshoe Club. In November 2000 Matthews plead no contest to a misdemeanor battery, being ordered to pay a $1000 fine.

== Death and legacy ==
Stupak died of leukemia on September 25, 2009, at 67.

In February 2016, the Las Vegas Planning Commission and the Las Vegas City Council unanimously approved the renaming of one block of Baltimore Avenue as Bob Stupak Avenue. The renaming occurred on Stupak's birthday, April 6, 2016, as part of a 20th anniversary celebration held for the Stratosphere on the property's south side, near the corner of Baltimore Avenue and Las Vegas Boulevard.

A community center and a park named after Stupak are located near the Stratosphere. The community center was opened in 1992, and was demolished in 2010, to be replaced by the new Stupak Park. A new Stupak Community Center was opened on January 4, 2010. The new facility is 34,183 square feet and cost $7.5 million to construct. The community center celebrated its 25th anniversary in January 2017.

On his passing, in 2009; College of Southern Nevada history professor Michael Green observed that "The best way to describe him is as a 20th century version of P.T. Barnum" and "He was a visionary, and what he envisioned, he achieved."
