= Double Exposure Blackjack =

Variety of blackjack

Double Exposure Blackjack (also known as Zweikartenspiel German: "Two card game") is a variant of the casino game blackjack in which the dealer receives two cards face-up in part of the initial deal. Knowing the dealer's hand provides significant information to the player. To maintain the house edge, the payout when the player receives a natural blackjack is reduced to even money from 3:2, and players lose their bets when their hand is tied with the dealer. In addition, with both dealers' cards exposed at the outset, players cannot buy insurance or surrender their hand.

Other rules changes also exist to the detriment of players. Certain tables restrict doubling down and splitting, and do not allow doubles after splits.

The game was proposed by Richard A. Epstein in 1977, and first appeared at Vegas World in 1979 with rule changes that favored the house.

The basic strategy for this game is different, both because the player can see dealer cards 11 to 20 and because the player loses all ties except blackjacks. For examples, two ten-value cards are split whenever the dealer has 13 through 16, and a hard 19 must be hit if the dealer has a 20.
