= Trumped! =

Radio show hosted by Donald Trump

- Running time: 2 minutes
- Country of origin: United States
- Language: English
- Hosted by: Donald Trump
- Recording studio: New York
- Original release: June 14, 2004 – 2008
- Sponsored by: Office Depot
- Website: TrumpOnAir.com (archived)

Trumped! was an American daily talk radio program hosted by Donald Trump, which ran from 2004 to 2008.

== History ==
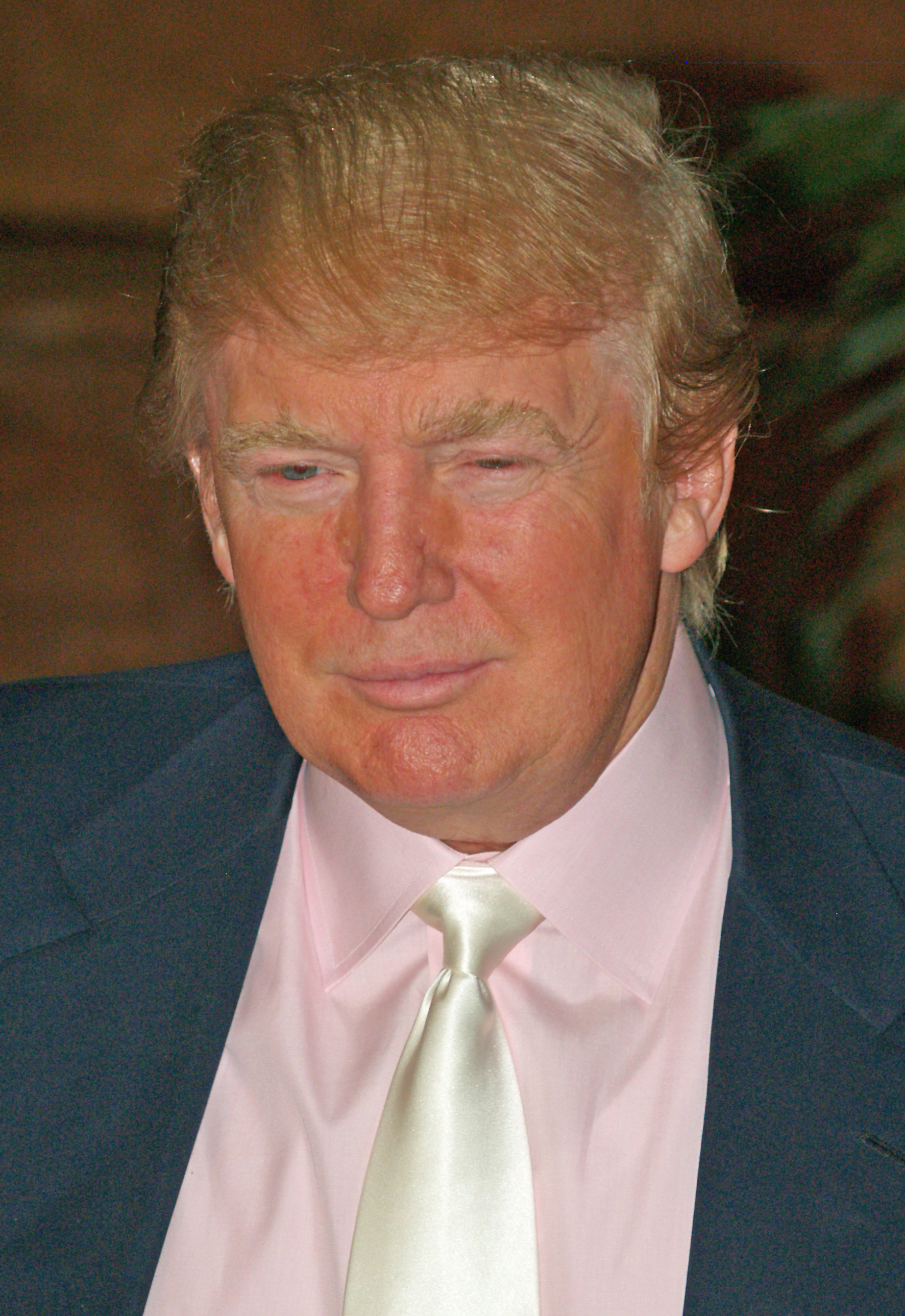
Donald Trump

Donald Trump had contacted Infinity Broadcasting Corporation and Clear Channel Communications, both of which had interest in having him do a radio program. Trump chose Clear Channel, to do a 90-second program. Trumped! was announced on April 29, 2004. The program was to feature Trump discussing economic, political, and pop cultural matters. Trump's commentaries were to last 60 to 90 seconds, and would air in the morning. Friday segments would feature Trump discussing his decision to fire each contestant on the previous night's new episode of The Apprentice. Prior to the program's launch, Office Depot signed up to sponsor the program as part of a deal in which Trump would read the company's ads on the air.

Trumped! began airing on Trump's 58th birthday: June 14, 2004. The program had the largest launch in radio history, premiering on 320 Clear Channel stations. Trump hosted the program from his New York office. On the program, Trump expressed his views on current events, life, sports, entertainment, finance, economics, business, real estate, and politics. An October 2004 newspaper gives a length of two minutes for the program.

As of February 2006, Trumped! aired on approximately 400 Clear Channel stations. Trump made approximately 1,000 appearances on the show before it ended in 2008.

== See also ==
- List of things named after Donald Trump
