= Vegas World =

Historic hotel and casino in Las Vegas

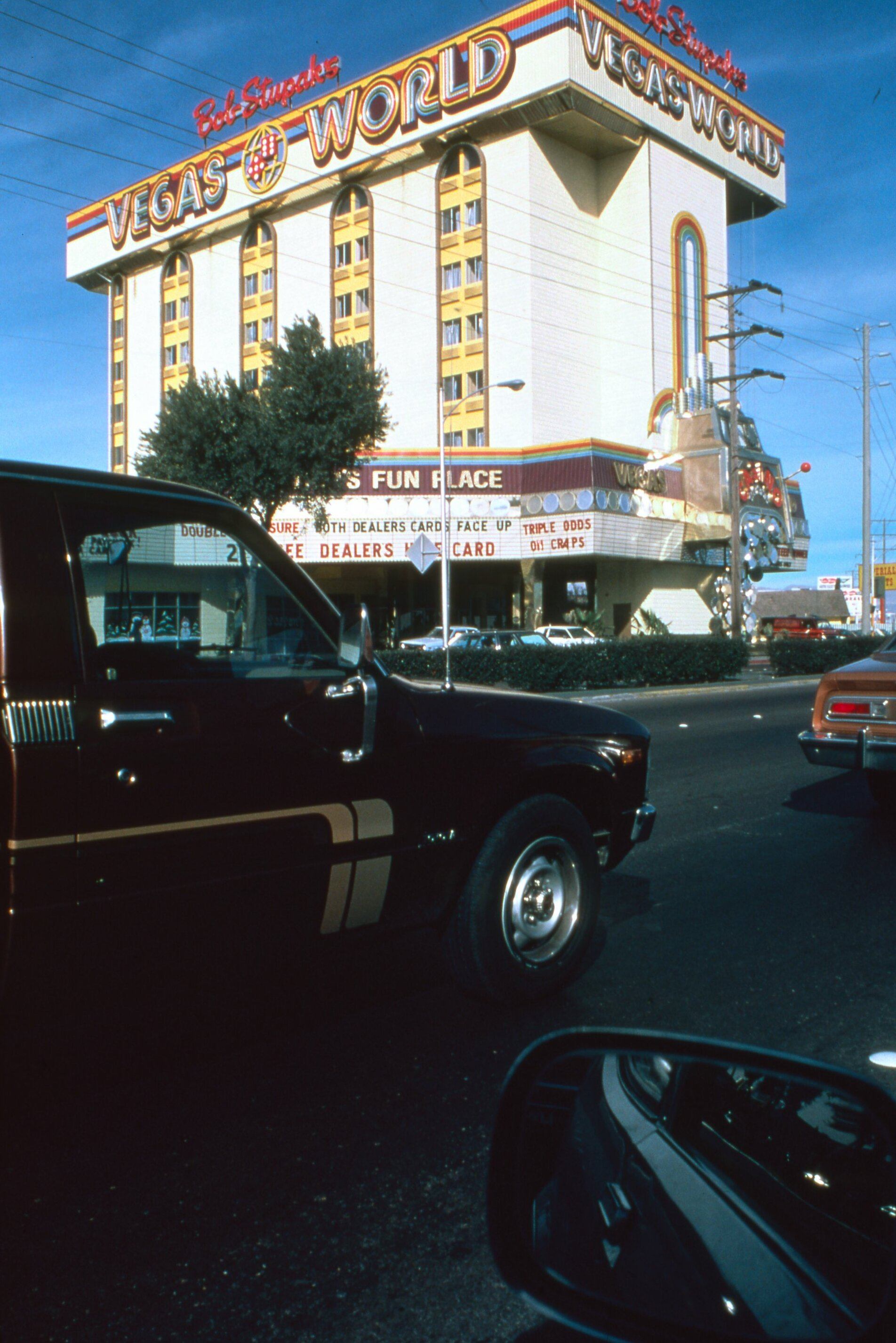
- Vegas World's original eight-story tower

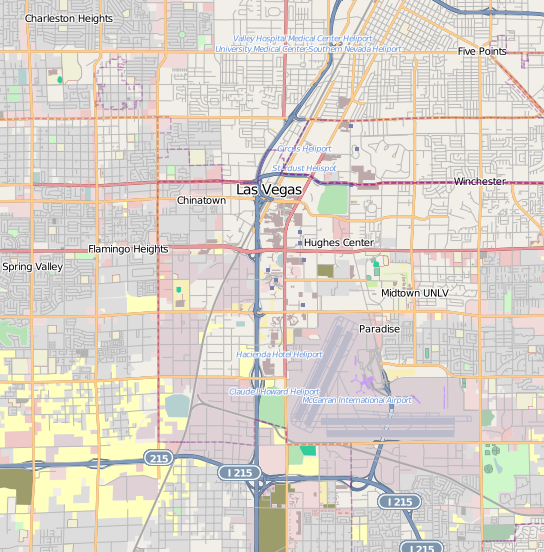
- Location within Las Vegas Boulevard Location within Nevada
- Interactive map of Vegas World
- Location: Las Vegas, Nevada; 2000 South Las Vegas Boulevard; 36.148293°N 115.155137°W
- Opened: July 13, 1979
- Closed: February 1, 1995; 31 years ago
- Theme: Outer space
- No. of rooms: 90 (1979); 932 (1990)
- Gaming space: 15,000 sq ft (1,400 m^{2})
- Signature attractions: Replica of the Apollo Lunar Module
- Casino type: Land-based
- Owner: Bob Stupak
- Renovated in: 1983–84; 1990

Vegas World was a space-themed casino and hotel on Las Vegas Boulevard in Las Vegas, Nevada. It was owned and operated by Bob Stupak, and was also signed as Bob Stupak's Vegas World.

Stupak initially opened a small casino, Bob Stupak's World Famous Million-Dollar Historic Gambling Museum and Casino, on the property in 1974, but it was destroyed in a fire later that year. Stupak later opened Vegas World on July 13, 1979, on the same property. Vegas World opened with a 15,000 sq ft (1,400 m^{2}) casino, and 90 hotel rooms in an eight-story tower. A 25-story tower was added in 1984, and a new wing was added to the tower in 1990, for a total of 932 rooms.

In 1984, stuntman Dan Koko set two world records for separate stunts in which he jumped from the rooftop of Vegas World's 25-story hotel tower. Vegas World featured the world's first quarter-million and million-dollar slot-machine jackpots, as well as the world's largest mural, the world's largest Big Six wheel, and reputedly the world's largest exterior sign. Vegas World closed on February 1, 1995, to be remodeled and integrated into Stupak's new project, the Stratosphere. Vegas World's two hotel towers were renovated for use as the Stratosphere's hotel.

== History ==
=== Original casino (1974) ===
In the early 1970s, Bob Stupak purchased 1.5 acres (0.61 ha) of land at 2000 South Las Vegas Boulevard, located north of the Sahara Hotel and Casino and the Las Vegas Strip, in a seedy part of the city. The land was occupied by the Todkill/Bill Hayden Lincoln Mercury car dealership, and was purchased by Stupak at a cost of $218,000, with money he raised himself and from his father's friends.

On March 31, 1974, he opened a small casino called Bob Stupak's World Famous Million-Dollar Historic Gambling Museum and Casino. Stupak said, "The name was about 10 feet longer than the casino." The casino featured 15 slot machines, including a quarter slot that offered a $250,000 jackpot and a nickel slot that advertised a $50,000 payout. The casino also featured various memorabilia, including antique slot machines, a gambling chip collection, and photographs of former gambling figures such as Bugsy Siegel. The casino's floors and walls were papered with $1 bills that were covered by plastic. The casino also featured a $100,000 bill.

Shortly before 8:00 p.m. on May 21, 1974, a fire broke out at the casino. Nine fire units responded; 35 firefighters battled the fire for several hours, during which a section of South Las Vegas Boulevard had to be closed. The fire was visible for several miles throughout the Las Vegas Valley. The casino was destroyed, although firefighters successfully saved most of the money attached to the casino's walls. The fire was believed to have been caused by an air conditioner. Stupak's insurance company, the San Francisco-based Fireman's Fund American Insurance Company, suspected Stupak of arson and filed a suit against him in June 1975, alleging that he burned down his casino to collect insurance money of $300,000. The insurance company eventually settled the claim.

=== Vegas World (1979–1995) ===
After the fire, Stupak managed to persuade Valley Bank to lend him more than $1 million to complete what would be known as Vegas World. Groundbreaking was scheduled to begin on June 22, 1978, on the same property occupied by Stupak's previous casino. Stupak opened the space-themed Vegas World on July 13, 1979, with 90 hotel rooms in an eight-story tower, and a 15,000 sq ft (1,400 m^{2}) casino. Construction cost $7 million. Vegas World debuted with the slogan, "The Sky's the Limit". Stupak considered Vegas World to be part of the Las Vegas Strip, despite being located 1,200 feet north of it. At first, Vegas World suffered, only making $7 million in revenue its first year. However, at its peak, Vegas World made $100 million a year in gambling revenues.

In 1983, Stupak began an expansion of Vegas World, which included the addition of a 25-story hotel tower that was finished a year later, for a total of 400 rooms. The hotel's second and thirteenth floors were not labeled as such; Stupak explained, "When a shooter hits a two at the dice tables, it's 'snake-eyes,' a loser. No twos, no lose." The casino featured the world's first quarter-million and million-dollar slot machine jackpots, as well as the "world's largest Big Six wheel", which measured 50 to 60 feet in diameter and required an electric motor to spin. The casino also featured "crapless craps", and a blackjack variation known as double exposure 21 that was introduced in 1979. Double exposure 21 became a popular game at many other Las Vegas casinos following its introduction at Vegas World. As of 1980, Vegas World was the only casino in the world to offer triple odds craps. The casino was also considered innovative for offering no-limit wagering and gambling coupons. In addition, Vegas World offered automobiles as jackpot prizes, a concept that was later used in other casinos.

On May 19, 1984, a stuntman named Dan Koko set the world "fire fall" record when he jumped off the hotel's roof as part of a stunt, plummeting 250 feet while wearing a flame-resistant suit that had been set on fire. Koko performed another stunt on August 30, 1984, in which he climbed atop a small platform, 326 feet above the ground and positioned on a 90-foot scaffolding, located on the roof of the 25-story hotel tower. Koko then jumped and successfully landed on a 22-foot-high, 2,000-pound air bag that was custom-made for the occasion at a cost of $45,000. Koko became the new holder of the world "high fall" record, previously set by Dar Robinson. Inside Vegas World following the stunt, Koko received $1 million in cash from Stupak, as part of a deal they made. It was the highest price ever paid for a free fall stunt. Stupak accepted the deal for the publicity.

The resort featured what was reputedly the largest exterior sign in the world. On the evening of May 30, 1991, high winds knocked the sign over, leaving it partially hanging over South Las Vegas Boulevard. Vegas World also suffered a power outage from the high winds, although backup generators provided enough power for some of the casino to remain operational. The sign was restored early the next morning, but loose wires sparked onto the roof and caused a fire. Vegas World was evacuated with the exception of the bottom four floors. Two dozen firefighters responded to the fire. Evacuated guests were allowed to return to their rooms after approximately a half-hour. A crew from Young Electric Sign Company removed the wrecked sign later that morning.

==== Vacation packages ====
During the late 1980s, Stupak advertised Vegas World vacation packages through national magazines and mail. In October 1990, the Nevada Gaming Commission filed a complaint against Stupak, alleging that he fraudulently promised customers vacation packages for Vegas World that consisted of free trips, gifts and complimentary gaming tokens. In February 1991, Stupak settled the complaint and was fined $125,000 by the Nevada Gaming Commission.

Stupak continued to run newspaper advertisements for "free Las Vegas vacations" at Vegas World. Later that year, the Nevada Consumer Affairs Division met with the gaming commission to discuss the legality of the advertisements, following the earlier complaint. The gaming commission launched an investigation to determine if Stupak broke his earlier settlement deal; Stupak said the advertisements were legal. In those advertisements, Stupak requested a $396 check from customers in exchange for a three-day, two-night stay at Vegas World. Customers would also receive $400 in cash, and other benefits.

==== Stratosphere project and closure ====
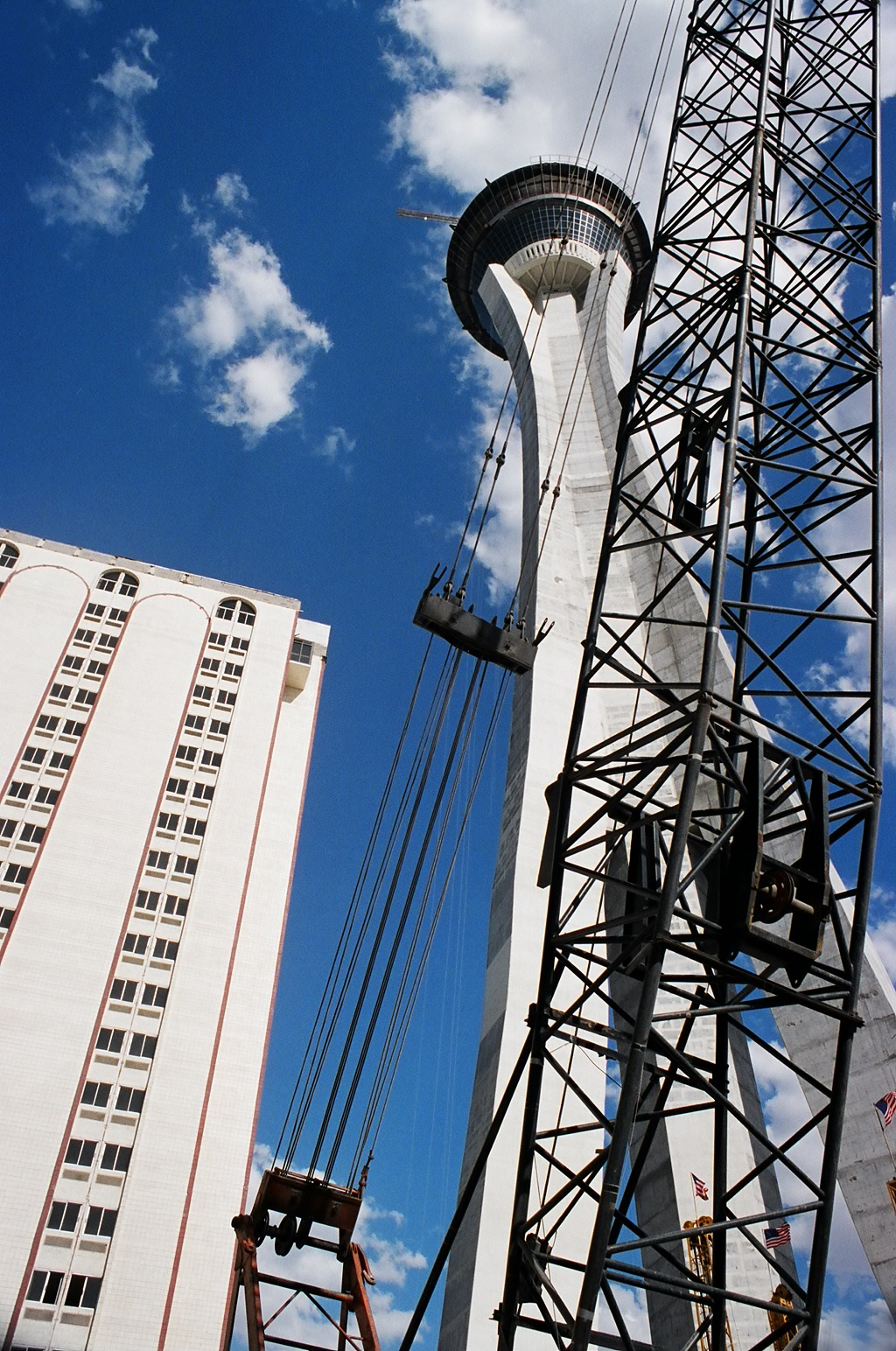
Vegas World's 25-story hotel tower (left), next to the Stratosphere tower during its construction in 1995

In 1989, Stupak was planning a new 1,012-foot neon sign tower for Vegas World. The idea eventually evolved into the Stratosphere observation tower, approved by the Las Vegas City Council in 1990. At the time, Vegas World was the largest personally owned casino resort in the world. A new wing was added to the 25-story hotel tower that year.

Construction of the Stratosphere began in February 1992, on property adjacent to Vegas World. On August 29, 1993, around midnight, hundreds of customers evacuated Vegas World when a fire broke out at the half-finished Stratosphere tower. Power went out shortly afterwards. According to employees, a hysterical woman ran through the casino screaming, "Bob Stupak did this for the insurance money!" Upon learning of the fire, Marty Allen (of the Allen & Rossi comedy show at Vegas World) and his wife arrived to keep evacuated customers entertained. Guests were allowed to return around 4:00 a.m.

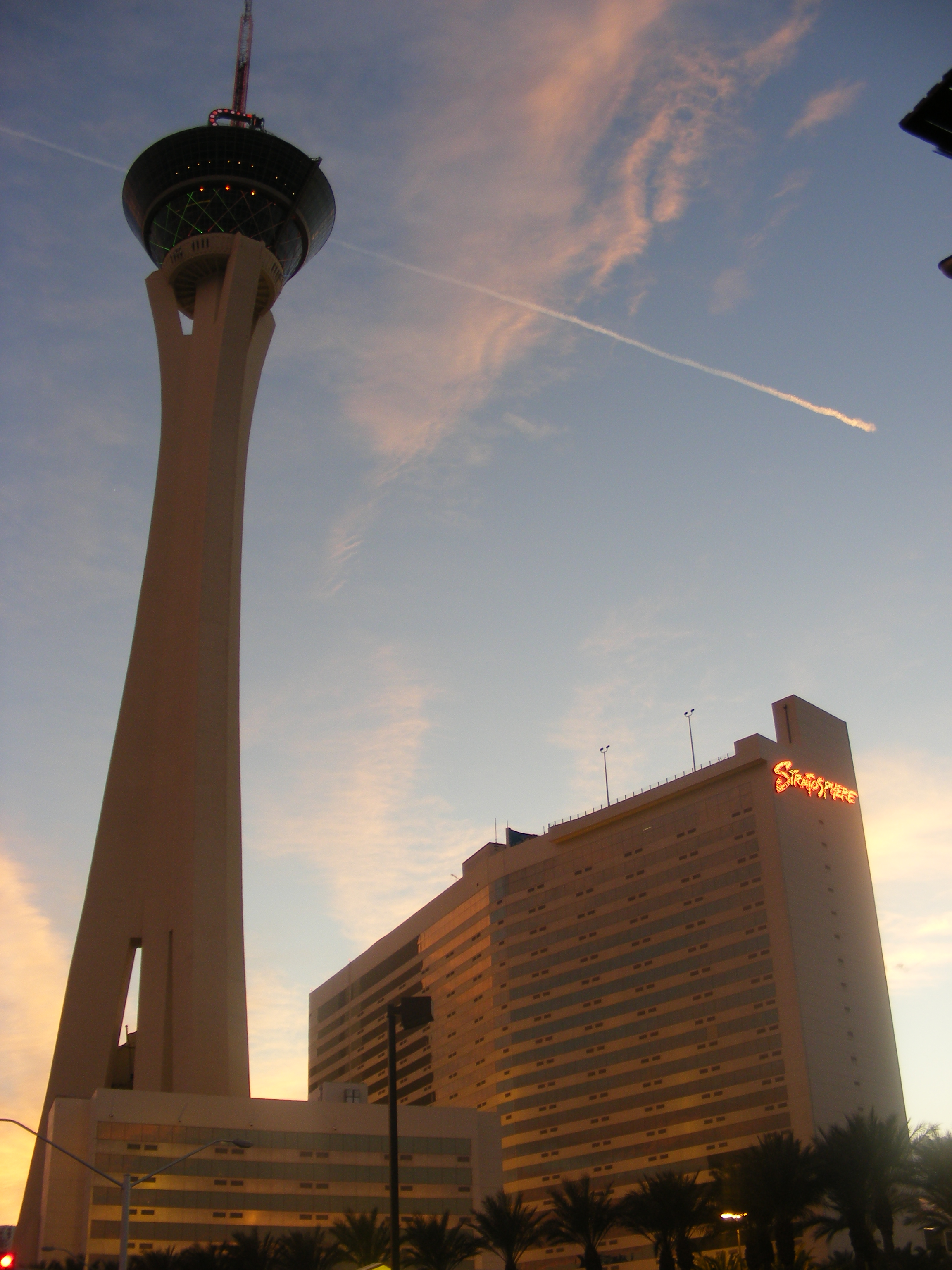
The former 8-story and 25-story Vegas World towers, seen here as part of the Stratosphere in 2009

In November 1993, Grand Casinos announced plans to purchase 33 percent of the Stratosphere and Vegas World by acquiring shares in Stupak's Stratosphere Corporation. In September 1994, Stupak rehired 36 hotel maids who had been fired for wearing union buttons on their clothing during an ongoing dispute between Stupak and a local union.

Stratosphere Corporation, a subsidiary of Grand Casinos, completed its purchase of Vegas World in November 1994, for approximately $51 million. As part of the deal, the company leased the property to Stupak until its closure. Vegas World closed on February 1, 1995, for remodeling in order to be integrated into the Stratosphere resort. A majority of Vegas World's final customers consisted of people redeeming their vacation packages. Vegas World's two hotel towers, consisting of 932 rooms, were renovated to become part of the Stratosphere resort, which opened in April 1996. Stupak later said that he felt prouder when he opened his earlier casinos on the site in 1974 and 1979.

== Theme and memorabilia ==
Vegas World featured an extensive collection of space-themed memorabilia such as rocket sculptures, as well as a replica of the Apollo Lunar Module and a life-sized astronaut that both hung from the ceiling. The hotel featured a spaceport-themed check-in lobby, while other parts of the hotel featured mirrored walls and ceilings in a black interior that was accompanied by stars and plastic columns filled with bubbling, colored liquid. The hotel also featured what was claimed to be genuine Moon rocks (approximately the size of rice grains), which Stupak somehow obtained from the Nicaraguan government. Vegas World was also known for having $1 million in cash on display in the casino.

During the 1980s, artists Robert Barnett Newman (an original member of The Motels) and Paul Whitehead created various space-themed murals on Vegas World's two hotel towers, measuring 25 and 10 stories high. At the time, it set a record in The Guinness Book of Records for the world's largest mural. One of the murals featured an astronaut gambling in space. After its closure, much of Vegas World's space memorabilia wound up in a collection of various items owned by Lonnie Hammargren, a local collector and former Lieutenant Governor of Nevada, who was also an aspiring astronaut.

Anthony Curtis of the Las Vegas Advisor opined that Vegas World was "one of the most bizarre casinos in the city's history", and wrote that its buffet, The Moon Rock, was "infamous for being among the worst in town." Author Jeff Burbank wrote that Vegas World was one of Las Vegas' "strangest and most outlandish hotel-casinos ever", calling it "a reflection" of Stupak and stating that its casino interior was "the weirdest in town" because of its outer space theme. The Sacramento Bee called it "the tackiest of tacky Vegas hotels". The Rocky Mountain News also called it the "wacky capital of tackiness".

== Shows ==
During the mid-1980s and into the 1990s, Vegas World featured a show starring a Frank Sinatra impersonator, titled Reflections of Sinatra. Vegas World's Galaxy Theatre, with seating for 1,330 people, opened on May 27, 1988. In October 1988, the comedy duo of Allen & Rossi filmed a television special inside the Galaxy Theater to mark their 25th anniversary as a team. In 1989, Allen & Rossi signed a "lifetime deal" to perform at Vegas World.

Zsa Zsa Gabor was the headliner at Vegas World's Galaxy Showroom for a six-day period from December 1990 to January 1991. It had been two decades since Gabor had performed in Las Vegas. Allen and Rossi's comedy show at Vegas World ended in 1993. During the 1990s, Vegas World's showroom featured an Elvis Presley impersonation show, titled Memories of Elvis and starring E.P. King.

== In popular culture ==
In 1980, Vegas World was featured in a segment on CBS' 60 Minutes program. It was briefly featured in the 1984 film Las Vegas Caper, as well as the 1985 film Fever Pitch. It was also used prominently for NBC's television series Crime Story, with many of the show's interior scenes being shot there. By 1988, Vegas World had been featured again on 60 Minutes, and had also appeared on The Merv Griffin Show and Ripley's Believe It or Not!. In August 1989, scenes were shot inside Vegas World for Queen of Diamonds, directed by experimental film maker Nina Menkes.
