= Trump Steaks =

Former steak brand

- Donald Trump in a promotional image for the steaks
- Product type: Steaks, burgers, sausage
- Current owner: Donald Trump
- Country: United States
- Introduced: May 8, 2007
- Discontinued: July 2007 (The Sharper Image)
- Registered as a trademark in: August 2006
- Tagline: "The World's Greatest Steaks"
- Website: Official website (archive)

Trump Steaks was a brand of steak and other meats that was licensed by Donald Trump. The brand was launched in May 2007 and was exclusively sold through The Sharper Image and QVC. Due to poor sales and a failure to live up to sales and product expectations, The Sharper Image discontinued the Trump Steaks product line in July 2007, just two months after its launch.

== History ==
Donald Trump registered "Trump Steaks" as a U.S. trademark in August 2006. Trump Steaks were launched on May 8, 2007, exclusively through The Sharper Image's catalog, stores, and website as part of a three-month trial period. Later that month, Trump and some contestants from his reality television series The Apprentice attended an event at a Rockefeller Plaza Sharper Image store to promote the steaks.

The meat was supplied by Buckhead Beef, an Atlanta-based company and subsidiary of Sysco. Buckhead Beef also supplied meat to many of Trump's hotel-casino properties. Burgers and sausages were also sold under the Trump Steaks name. The steaks were USDA Angus certified and came in four packages with prices ranging from $199 (with two bone-in rib-eyes, two filet mignons and 12 burgers), $349, $499, and $999, with the tagline of "The World's Greatest Steaks". A Trump Steak Gift Card was also sold at a cost of $1,037. Trump Steaks was featured in a May 2007 Saturday Night Live episode that mocked the brand.

Trump was featured on the cover of the June 2007 Sharper Image catalogue to promote Trump Steaks. On June 5, 2007, Trump Steaks debuted on the QVC home shopping television channel, with Trump making an appearance on the network. Trump Steaks (16) 6oz Certified Angus Beef Steakburgers were sold by QVC.

Trump Steaks were sold at The Sharper Image for two months before being discontinued. According to Sharper Image CEO Jerry W. Levin, "The net of all that was we literally sold almost no steaks, if we sold $50,000 of steaks grand total, I'd be surprised." Advertisements featuring Trump's photo attracted customers to buy other products at the store. Trump Steaks were discontinued at QVC around the same time as the Sharper Image discontinuation. The Trump Steaks trademark was canceled in December 2014 according to a trademark search through the United States Patent and Trademark Office.

== 2007 reception ==
The New York Post conducted a blind taste test and compared Trump Steaks with mail-order porterhouses from Peter Luger Steak House and three New York City establishments. Trump Steaks earned a rating of 7.5 out of 10 (with the high cost of Trump Steaks noted), losing to $35/lb ($77/kg) mail-order porterhouses from Peter Luger with a rating of 9.5, but a higher rating than the Greenwich Village butcher and the Ottomanelli Brothers. Tad's Steaks, (Note: Attributed to multiple references) a cheap steak cafeteria, received "This cow should be ashamed". The Associated Press and The Oklahoman wrote positive reviews of the steaks, but also noted the high price. The Palm Beach Post panelists best rated the Angus-certified and prime-graded bone-in rib-eye against choice-graded bone-in rib-eyes and prime-graded Publix, giving the steaks an "A" and writing "Trump isn't kidding. Our panelists could barely believe how flavorful and tender the 16-ounce [450 g] bone-in rib-eye was." However, the high price of the steaks was also noted (the others were $9–$16/lb or $20–$35/kg). Gourmet opined, "these steaks are wholly mediocre".

== 2016 U.S. presidential election ==
In August 2015, Time magazine included Trump Steaks on a list of Trump business failures. In December 2015, during the 2016 U.S. presidential campaign, a super PAC supporting John Kasich produced an ad mocking Trump Steaks. On February 10, 2016, the New York Daily News included Trump Steaks on a list of Trump business failures. Steaks from West Palm Beach's Bush Brothers Provision Co. were on display at Trump's Florida news conference celebrating his latest primary victories on March 8, 2016, during which Trump falsely claimed them to be "Trump Steaks". Trump-branded wine and water were also displayed, as an example of Trump's success in business. Observers there noted the Trump-named steaks were produced by a butcher in West Palm Beach. In March 2016, Vox noted that on QVC's website "reviews of Trump steaks were, um, mixed", with more than half of the reviews negative (1 star to 2 stars). In an interview with Anderson Cooper the following day, Trump said that he does not process the steaks but instead purchases them from local suppliers. As of April 2016, the only place the steaks can still be purchased is at Trump's various properties.

== See also ==
- List of things named after Donald Trump
