= Kenneth Molloy =

Judge on New York State Supreme Court

Kenneth Dennis Molloy (August 2, 1919 – March 9, 1999) was a judge on the New York State Supreme Court.

== Early life ==
Molloy was born in Brooklyn, New York and attended high school at Manual Training High School, where he played lacrosse, basketball, baseball and swimming. He also worked on the school newspaper, was class president and a member of the student government. Molloy was also a member of the Mu Chapter of the Omega Gamma Delta fraternity and became acquainted with Manhasset through both the fraternity (which had a chapter in Manhasset) and through lacrosse which was then the only school on Long Island to have a team.

Molloy subsequently attended Syracuse University, where he was a two-time All-American as a member of the lacrosse team. He was also a member of the Sigma Chi fraternity.

== World War II ==
On March 29, 1943, Ens. Molloy was assigned to Squadron 21 and told to report to Commander Motor Torpedo Squadron Twenty-One, Navy Yard, New York for outfitting. He then served as a PT boat commander in the Pacific in World War II where he was awarded a Silver Star for "conspicuous gallantry and intrepidity in action against the enemy" while holding the rank of Lieutenant (jg.). His citation reads:

On 17 August 1944, as Commanding Officer of Motor Torpedo Boat 326, he was conducting a patrol against Japanese barges on the west shore of Geelvink Bay. On the previous night another PT patrol had sighted and attacked approximately twelve enemy barges on the beach on the southeastern coast of Mansiman Island, off Manokwari, New Guinea. Under orders to make a close reconnaissance of these barges, and to destroy any that remained serviceable, he approached the position in broad daylight to within twenty yards of the beach. He first made one run at a very slow speed to appraise the number and condition of the enemy craft. He then reversed his course and thoroughly strafed the entire row of barges. At this time heavy calibre enemy batteries at Manokwari opened up, as well as machine gun positions on Mansiman. Despite this, he courageously and aggressively made a second run in the face of the fire to within fifty yards of the barges and beach. It has been definitely established that three of the craft were sunk, and all the remaining barges were damaged beyone repair. His skill and calmness were outstanding. His leadership was an inspiration to his men. His actions were in keeping with the highest traditions of the Navy of the United States.

−Thomas C. Kinkaid, Vice Admiral, U.S. Navy, Commander Seventh Fleet. Classified Citation

Following his tour as a PT boat commander, Molloy was recruited by the O.S.S. to head a highly dangerous mission in connection with the projected invasion of Japan. A small fleet of junks was to be filled with high explosives and sunk over the tunnels connecting the Japanese southern islands with the main island, to destroy them prior to the actual invasion and impede the movement of troops. A single junk was designated to attempt rescue of the crews. Molloy and his associates were returning to the Pacific from training in the United States when the atom bombs were dropped, averting the invasion. Molloy had sufficiently impressed the head of the O.S.S., General William Donovan, that he later offered Molloy a place in his law firm on graduation from law school. He did not accept.

== Later life ==
Following his time in the Navy, he returned to Syracuse for law school and doubled as the Syracuse Varsity Lacrosse coach. Molloy passed the New York Bar Exam while still a law student and the Bar Association responded by barring students from taking the exam in future.

Molloy moved to Manhasset after law school and became involved in the local lacrosse program and expanding the lacrosse programs at Long Island schools. Over his nearly 50 years in Manhasset, his community involvement led to his being dubbed "Mr. Manhasset." During the 1960s he was an unsuccessful Republican nominee for Congress. The lacrosse field in Manhasset and an annual Lacrosse Invitational are named after him.

Molloy played a role in the cultivation of Jim Brown's athletic career. When the coaching staff at Syracuse University did not offer a scholarship to Brown, Molloy raised enough money to pay for Brown's first year and obtained a promise from the school that if Brown proved to be a talented athlete, he would be put on scholarship.

He died in March 1999, with a formal memorial service held at the Supreme Court Building in Mineola. His son, Kenneth Molloy, and grandson, Kenneth Thomas Molloy, are named after him.
