= Donald Trump's Real Estate Tycoon =

2002 video game

- Developer(s): RedCap GmbH; Airborne Entertainment Inc. (mobile)
- Publisher(s): NA: Activision Value; EU: Empire Interactive
- Producer(s): Mathias Reichert; Brian Kirkvold
- Programmer(s): Michael Kriegel; Ralf Mohmeyer
- Artist(s): Péter Szücsy; Karoly Körmendi; Péter Rigó; Gabor Forrai; Róbert Kovács
- Composer(s): Péter Tolnay; Dr. Giovanni Vidingi
- Platform(s): Microsoft Windows, J2ME, BREW, N-Gage QD
- Release: Microsoft Windows: NA: November 7, 2002; EU: September 3, 2004; J2ME, BREW, NGQD: NA: October 20, 2004
- Genre(s): Business simulation
- Mode(s): Single-player

Donald Trump's Real Estate Tycoon is a business simulation game developed by RedCap and published by Activision Value. It was released for Microsoft Windows on November 7, 2002. It was later published in Europe by Empire Interactive under their Xplosiv banner on September 3, 2004. On October 20, 2004, Activision Value published a version of the game that was developed by Airborne Entertainment for J2ME and BREW-enabled mobile phones, as well as the N-Gage QD. It is themed around the businessman Donald Trump, who provided his voice for both versions of the game.

== Gameplay ==
Donald Trump's Real Estate Tycoon is a single-player video game. The player's goal is to beat Donald Trump by becoming the most influential business tycoon in the game. In the Windows version, the player must choose the best real estate location in one of five cities: Los Angeles, New York City, Atlantic City, London and Paris. The mobile version consists of only one city. Each city is viewed from an isometric perspective. Each of the five cities contains an office, which opens at 6:00 AM and closes at 10:00 PM. Because of this, the player will sometimes have to focus on other cities or wait.

The game features four different types of real estate: commercial, hotel, office, and residential. Each type of real estate comes in three different building sizes: small, medium, and large. Trump checks on the player's progress every six months in the game. If Trump is impressed with the player's progress, he will promote the player up an additional floor in his headquarters. The player's goal is to reach Trump on the top floor. Trump also offers advice and hints to the player throughout the game.

A player may choose and purchase a piece of real estate. The price varies on its size or how long the game progresses. After the land is purchased, a building can be constructed on it.

Before construction, the style, quality, number of floors (up to 12) and building duration are to be selected. The better the quality of the building and the slower the construction time, the higher the cost. Each floor of the building can be made into three types of rooms: shops, offices or condos. Shops are the most expensive to build but can be marketed at a higher price. Offices generate rather small profits but are cheaper to construct.

Once a building is complete, the player can market the rooms in one of two ways: selling or leasing. Through selling, a complete payment is achieved instantly. In leasing, payments are received on a monthly basis.

When short on budget, the player can borrow money from any of four banks. Loans are paid back automatically after an assigned number of months (the money the player has in hand will have some deduction for this matter). Therefore, sufficient amounts of profit have to be earned after borrowing.

A building's quality deteriorates over time. When reusing them for commercial purpose, it is best to have them renovated. Through renovation, certain rooms can be changed into others. A change in the building's style and number of floors can only be achieved through demolition and reconstruction.

=== Challenging Trump ===
If the five city levels are passed, the player then faces a business competition with Trump. The object of the challenge is to go into business against Trump for a fixed number of years and then prevail over Trump with a higher profit margin, culminating with the ultimate goal of driving him into bankruptcy. Unlike the previous missions, natural disasters and criminal activity occur which cause damage to property. The mobile version also allows the player to overtake Trump in the business industry.

== Reception ==
Avery Score of GameSpot gave the N-Gage QD version a 7.2 out of 10. Score called the game's auction sequences "incredibly boring", and wrote that "despite the game's 'unique branding', it is – at heart – a typical tycoon game that doesn't depart in any way from the conventions of the genre. While the game could have benefited from more-varied gameplay and smarter rival artificial intelligence, Real Estate Tycoon's strong presentation makes it an offering worthy of notice by fans of business simulations." Score praised the game's graphics, and wrote that while the game does not feature "much of an audio component, what's there is decent. No background music accompanies the gameplay, sadly, but your biannual reviews by Mr. Trump feature a vocal clip from the man himself." Score concluded that while the game "doesn't have any major flaws, it does fail to provide a varied experience. [...] After you're promoted 99 times, the game is over, but it's likely most gamers will tire of the game before they reach this level, as there's only one city in the game, and only so much you can do there. Doing nothing but buying low and selling high can hold one's interest for only so long."
