= Donald Trump in popular culture =

Donald Trump, the 45th and 47th president of the United States, has attracted considerable media attention during his career as a celebrity personality, businessman, and politician. He has been portrayed and appeared in popular culture since the 1980s, including several cameo appearances and lookalikes in film and television. He has also been a popular target for parody including in cartoons and via impressions.

== Art ==
In 1989, Ralph Wolfe Cowan painted a portrait of Trump called The Visionary, which hangs in Trump's Palm Beach residence of Mar-a-Lago.

Several Madame Tussauds museums have included a life-size wax statue of Trump.

Trump is alluded to with Maurizio Cattelan's 2016 sculpture America, a fully functioning toilet made of solid gold.

During the 2016 election, various artworks were made to satirize Donald Trump. These include Make Everything Great Again, a street art mural by Dominykas Čečkauskas and Mindaugas Bonanu depicting Trump French kissing Vladimir Putin, the president of Russia, and The Emperor Has No Balls, a series of sculptures depicting a nude Trump by the anarchist collective Indecline.

Cuban artist Edel Rodriguez painted a series of anti-Trump artworks for various magazines including Time and Der Spiegel. Illma Gore also created a piece titled Make America Great Again, which depicted Trump naked. The artwork was censored on social media sites, delisted from eBay and refused by galleries in the United States due to security concerns. It attracted bids of over £100,000 after going on display at Maddox Gallery in Mayfair, London, although the artist was anonymously threatened with legal action.

Trump has been portrayed positively in numerous paintings by far-right artist Jon McNaughton. Alissa Wilkinson in Vox described McNaughton as the "single most famous pro-Trump artist".

A life-size stainless-steel sculpture of Trump, We the People or Trump and His Magic Wand, was shown at a Conservative Political Action Conference in February 2021. Comedian Stephen Colbert commented "Nothing says 'the party of Christian values' like worshiping a golden idol". Since 2021, furniture maker and artist Hong Jinshi sells Trump Buddha's.

On October 28, 2024, an artwork entitled The Donald J. Trump Enduring Flame was installed in Freedom Plaza, Washington, D.C., United States. The approximately 8-foot-tall artwork was a bronze-colored stone column supporting a hand holding a tiki torch referencing the Unite the Right rally. The sculpture was slated to remain until 5pm on October 31, 2024, but was destroyed on October 30.

The Trump Defiance Monument, a bronze statue, was installed at the Trump International Golf Club in West Palm Beach, Florida in 2025. It was made by Lundeen Sculptures and inspired by pictures taken just after the attempted assassination of Trump in Pennsylvania in 2024.

In 2025, the satirical sculptures Dictator Approved and The Bitcoin President were temporarily installed in the National Mall. A satirical sculpture of Trump and Jeffrey Epstein called Best Friends Forever was briefly installed in the National Mall. It was promptly removed by the U.S. Park Police.

== Comics ==
Since 1986, he has been depicted in the Doonesbury comic strip by Garry Trudeau, prompting an unfavorable response from Trump. In 2016, the Trump-strips were released as a paperback, Yuge!: 30 Years of Doonesbury on Trump. Trump was also depicted in Berkeley Breathed's long-running political cartoon strip Bloom County since 1989 where his brain was placed inside the body of Bill the Cat after being hit by an anchor on his yacht, the Trump Princess. In 1990, a Dilbert comic strip indirectly referred to Trump as 'God of Capitalism'.

In the 1986 comic The Man of Steel, the villain Lex Luthor is reimagined as an evil corporate executive, based in part on Trump. In 1989, a one-issue Lex Luthor: The Unauthorized Biography was published with a cover mirroring Trump's book Trump: The Art of the Deal.

In 1989, Robert Crumb wrote "Point the Finger", a six-page comic story about Trump for Hup by Last Gasp.

In 1990, Heavy Metal published the story "The Wall" by Peter Kuper, set in a dystopic future where Donald Trump and Harry Helmsley builds a wall in New York to protect the good and well-off citizens from poor people.

In the comic-book story "Gazillionaire's Luck" originally published in 2015 and written by Michael T. Gilbert, Scrooge McDuck encounters a businessman who is a parody of Trump ("Ronald Plump") who wants Scrooge to tell him how he got to become so rich. Scrooge tells him that he got rich through thriftiness, patience and hard work, but it doesn't seem like he believes him. He steals Scrooge's Number One Dime thinking it will make him lucky, but instead he ends up ruining his own business.

During the 2016 election, various comic artists satirized Trump and his campaign. For example, following Pepe the Frog's association to the Trump campaign and the alt-right, Matt Furie published a satirical take of his appropriation on The Nib. The villain MODAAK, who appears in Spider-Gwen Annual by Marvel Comics, was based on Trump.

He is parodied in the Spanish Mort & Phil albums ¡El capo se escapa!, Drones Matones and El 60 aniversario, 2016–2017.

In addition to sporadic appearances throughout its main line, Mad magazine has made Trump the main subject of two special issues, Mad About Trump (2017) and Mad About the Trump Era (2019).

In July 2017, Antarctic Press released a satirical comic book titled Trump vs. Time Lincoln in which a time travelling version of Abraham Lincoln would face off against "Final Trump", who was inspired by Immortan Joe.

Trump appears in the 2020 Bomb Queen satirical graphic novel Ultimate Bomb: Trump Card as its main antagonist.

Trump appears in a 2020 story of the Japanese manga Death Note: The a-Kira Story. Here, he encounters Ryuk, a god of death, in the Oval Office.

In 2025, for a 50th-anniversary variant cover of the Canadian comic Captain Canuck, co-creator Richard Comely depicted the superhero holding Trump by the arm and pointing the middle finger at him. Comely stated the image reflected a Canadian response to Trump’s comments on tariffs and the idea of Canada becoming a U.S. state. Trump had previously appeared in the series.

== Films ==
Donald Trump and Macaulay Culkin in Home Alone 2: Lost in New York

Trump makes a cameo appearance as the Plaza Hotel owner in the 1992 movie Home Alone 2: Lost in New York. He also appeared as a guest in many films and series such as: The Fresh Prince of Bel-Air, The Job, Suddenly Susan, Sex and the City, The Drew Carey Show, Two Weeks Notice, Spin City, The Nanny, The Associate, The Little Rascals, Zoolander, and Eddie.

Trump: What's the Deal?, was screened twice in New York in July 1991, but was not publicly released until it became available on the Internet in 2015. In 2005, ABC aired Trump Unauthorized, a biographical television film starring Justin Louis as Trump.

Trump appeared with Rudy Giuliani in the 2005 documentary Giuliani Time.

You've Been Trumped (2011), a documentary film, follows Trump's efforts to develop a Scottish golf resort. When the BBC announced it would show the film in 2012, Trump's lawyers demanded that the film should not be shown, saying that it was defamatory and misleading. The BBC showed the film, defending the decision and stating that Trump had refused the opportunity to take part in the film.

In 2016, Funny or Die released a parody film called Donald Trump's The Art of the Deal: The Movie with Johnny Depp portraying Trump. Trump was also portrayed by Jeff Rector in the 2020 fantasy comedy film Bad President.

As the October 2015 date featured in the Back to the Future films approached, media outlets began noting similarities between the older version of the Biff Tannen character in Back to the Future Part II and then-presidential candidate Trump. Screenwriter Bob Gale said, "Yeah. That's what we were thinking about." Rolling Stone observes that Biff "resides in a palatial penthouse atop a casino, which bears a striking resemblance to the Trump Plaza Hotel".

The 2018 Chinese comedy-mystery film Detective Chinatown 2 features a police chief who is portrayed as a Donald Trump lookalike. The character's appearance and mannerisms resemble Trump, and a portrait of Trump is visible behind him in one scene. The character also makes a joke about the United States' immigration policies, saying that the president should build a wall on the West Coast to keep Asians out. The film was also described by the China Film Association as using the connection between the police chief and Trump to satirize Trump and his domestic and foreign policies.

Trump is a character in the 2019 English-Belgian CGI comedy The Queen's Corgi. In the film, he and Melania Trump along with their dog Mitzi visit Buckingham Palace to meet Queen Elizabeth. The film received negative reviews on this depiction and satire.

The independent biopic The Apprentice, about Trump's early years as a real estate developer and the relationship with attorney Roy Cohn (played by Jeremy Strong) premiered at the 2024 Cannes Film Festival. For his portrayal of Trump, Sebastian Stan received Oscar, BAFTA and Golden Globe nominations as Best Lead Actor. The Trump campaign denounced the movie as sensationalizing long-debunked lies and said it would be filing a lawsuit.

== Games ==
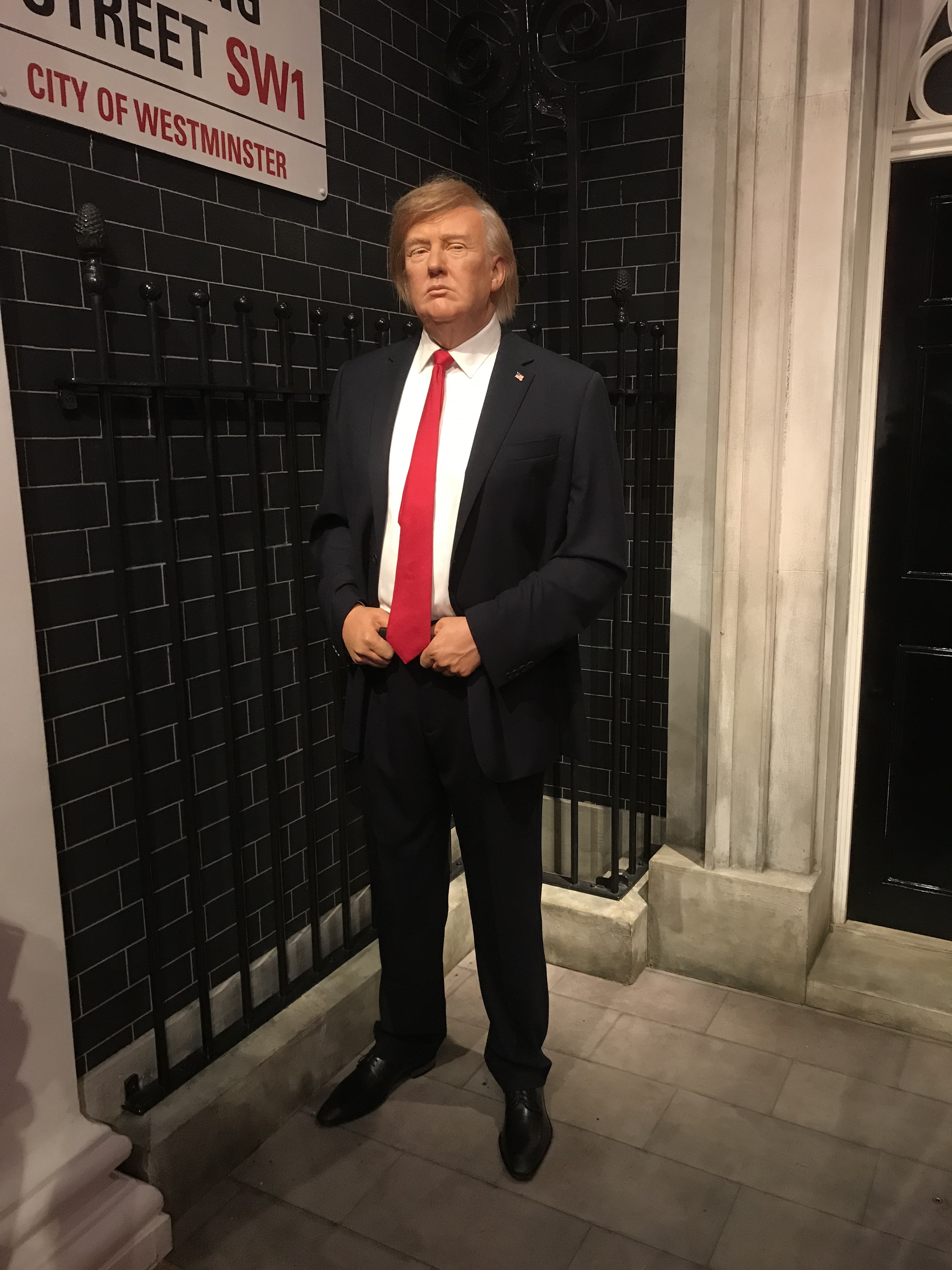
Donald Trump figure made out of wax at Madame Tussauds London

Trump Castle is a series of gambling simulation video games, named after Trump's Castle hotel and casino, published between 1989 and 1993. Trump: The Game, a board game inspired by Monopoly, was released in 1989. A second version was released in 2004, riding on the popularity of Trump's reality show The Apprentice. Donald Trump's Real Estate Tycoon, a business simulation computer game, was released in 2002. The computer game The Apprentice: Los Angeles, released in 2007, was based on the TV-series.

Trumptendo, a website with NES games hacked to include Trump, was launched in 2016. It included games like Punch-Out!! and Super Mario Bros.

Mr. President!, a satirical video game about saving president "Ronald Rump" from getting assassinated, got released in 2016 prior to the U.S. presidential election. The game went viral among YouTubers, and saw a resurgence in 2024 after the attempted assassination of Trump.

== Literature ==
Donald Trump, along with the Trump Tower, is depicted in the 1986 novel I'll Take Manhattan. Trump himself appears in the 1987 miniseries adaptation.

In American Psycho (1991) by Bret Easton Ellis, protagonist Patrick Bateman seeks to emulate Trump, dining at restaurants Trump patronized and advising a police officer investigating his murders to read The Art of the Deal.

A parody of Trump is the main villain in the 1992 The Destroyer novel Ghost in the Machine.

The erotic novel Trump Tower (2011) includes Trump as a character. It was originally marketed as authored by Trump.

Andrew Shaffer's satirical book, The Day of the Donald (2016), imagines Trump winning the 2016 presidential election and discusses his second year as America's 45th president. Shaffer initially wrote and published the book on believing Trump would not win his 2016 election.

The television series Twin Peaks (2017) features a mysterious artifact called the "Owl Cave ring". In Mark Frost's book Twin Peaks: The Final Dossier (2017), it is implied that Trump may have worn this ring.

In The Beautiful Poetry of Donald Trump (2017), the poems are composed of lines taken from Trump's tweets and speeches, with attribution added to every line of verse.

The 2018 poetry collection Sincerity by Carol Ann Duffy, British Poet Laureate, includes a poem entitled "Swearing In". It begins "Combover ... twitter-rat, tweet-twat, tripe-gob, muckspout", includes the expressions "tie-treader", and "mandrake mymmerkin", and ends "welcome to the White House".

Dumpty is a 2019 satirical poetry book by John Lithgow. The poems are about Trump and people in his administration.

Charlie Kaufman's 2020 novel Antkind includes Trump-robots armed with nuclear weapons.

=== Fan fiction ===
Trump has been included in self-published works, including fan fiction/slash fiction. Elijah Daniel's novella Trump Temptations: The Billionaire & The Bellboy (2016) was number one on some of Amazon.com's sales charts. A Kickstarter for the picture book D Is for Dump Trump: An Anti-Hate Alphabet raised $37,000 in 2016. Several erotic stories have been published. Fan fiction includes stories involving My Little Pony, Vince McMahon, SpongeBob SquarePants and Vladimir Putin.

=== Wikipedia ===
Trump's article on Wikipedia, created on January 9, 2004, has often been met with contentious discussions from editors on what should be included in the article, and there are accusations of political bias among the community. The article has extended confirmed protection, meaning only certain editors (editors with at least 30 days of activity and 500 edits) can edit the article. In 2016, the website "Loser.com" redirected to Trump's Wikipedia article.

== Music ==
Since the 1980s, Donald Trump's wealth and lifestyle have been a fixture of hip hop lyrics, his name being quoted by more than 50 artists.

In 2011, rapper Mac Miller released his "Donald Trump" song about rising to Trump-level riches, which became a Billboard hit. The billionaire subsequently requested royalties for using his name, starting a feud with Miller.

In 2016, rapper YG released a single titled "FDT" (Fuck Donald Trump), referring to Trump in a disparaging manner. In November 2019, Trump visited Madison Square Garden where people yelled the lyrics of the song at him.

== Television ==
Since 1988, Trump and members of his family have been parodied on Saturday Night Live (SNL). He has hosted SNL twice, in 2004 and 2015. Trump is one of four presidents who have appeared on Saturday Night Live, and the only president to have hosted the show. On SNL, Trump has been impersonated by several people, including Phil Hartman, Darrell Hammond and Alec Baldwin.

Trump appeared on The Oprah Winfrey Show in 1988 and 2011. When asked in 1988 if he considered running for president, he said he would "never want to rule it out totally." In 1999, he said that he would like Oprah Winfrey as his running mate.

Trump has appeared on and been involved in WWE programming (professional wrestling) several times since the late 1980s. Throughout these appearances, he has always taken on the persona of a generous billionaire who cares about the WWE fans, serving as a foil to Vince McMahon, the "villainous billionaire owner" character. On the January 2, 2007, episode of Monday Night Raw, Trump appeared virtually to interrupt "Vince McMahon Appreciation Night", showering the audience with thousands of dollars, beginning his feud with McMahon. On the March 12, 2007, episode of Monday Night Raw, Trump signed a contract for his "Battle of the Billionaires" WrestleMania match against Vince McMahon. At WrestleMania 23, he won the right to shave Vince McMahon's hair, after betting that Bobby Lashley would beat Umaga in a match. In 2009, Trump returned to WWE programming, purchasing Monday Night Raw from McMahon, who had fallen into bankruptcy in storyline, on the June 15th episode of the show, announcing that his first move as company owner would be to make next week's episode of Raw commercial-free for the entire 3-hour runtime. On the June 22 episode of Raw, Trump sold the show back to McMahon for twice the price he bought it for, also giving the audience of the show free attendance, refunding their ticket price. Additionally on this show, Trump encountered Santino Marella, who had then adopted his cross-dressing alter ego of Santina Marella. Trump, disgusted and annoyed by Marella, fired him as a part of the storyline.

A young Donald Trump is portrayed in "It's A Wonderful Leap", a 1992 episode of Quantum Leap.

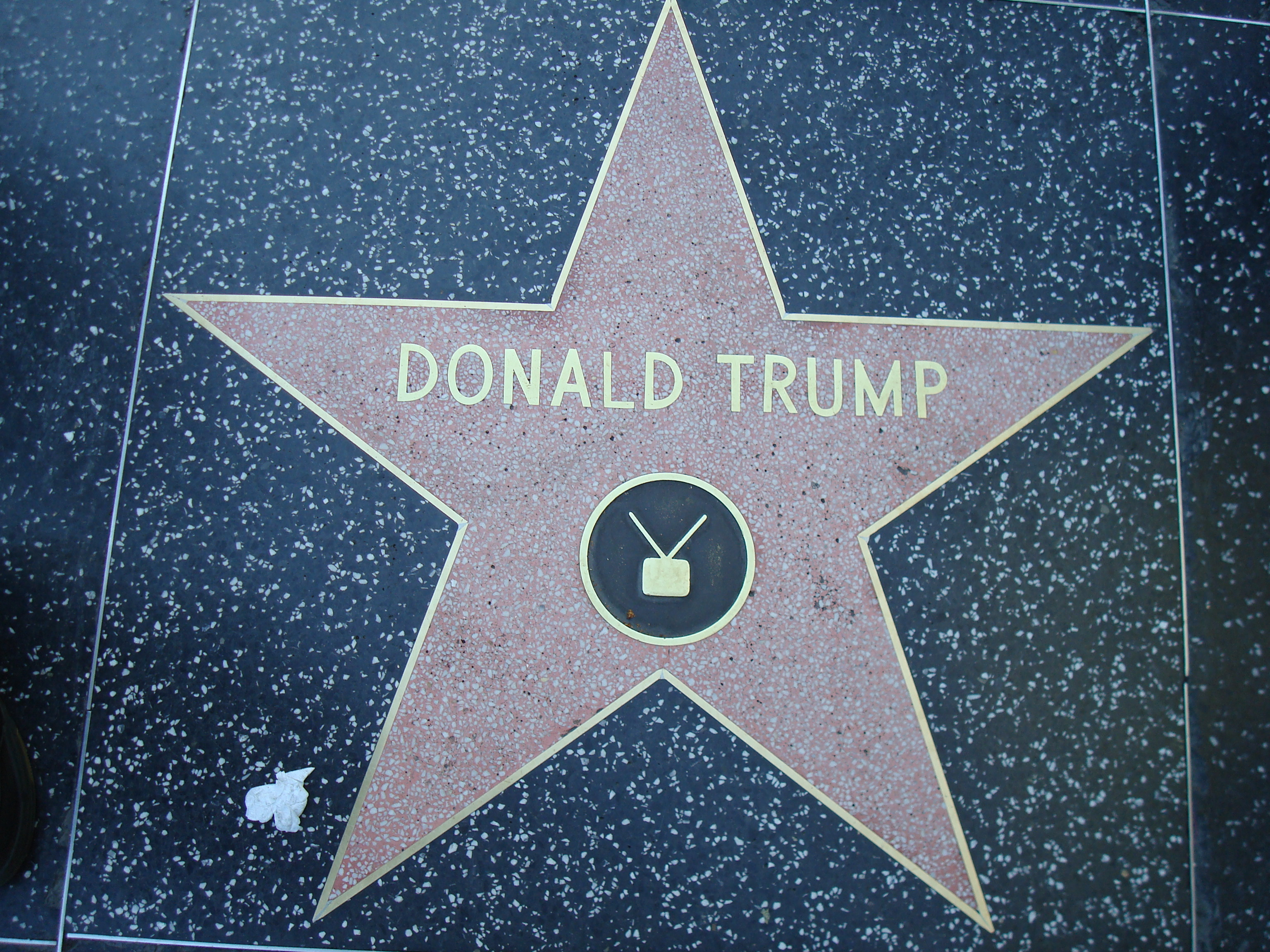
Donald Trump's star at the Hollywood Walk of Fame, for producing the Miss Universe pageant

From 1996 to 2015, Trump owned part or all of the Miss Universe pageants. He was selected for a star on the Hollywood Walk of Fame in 2007 for producing the shows.

A 2000 The Simpsons episode "Bart to the Future" shows a future where Trump has been president. Writer Dan Greaney said in 2016: "What we needed was for Lisa to have problems beyond her fixing, that everything went as bad as it possibly could, and that's why we had Trump be president before her. That just seemed like the logical last stop before hitting bottom. It was consistent with the vision of America going insane". After Donald Trump won the 2016 election, The Simpsons used the phrase "Being right sucks" in a chalkboard gag.

Trump hosted the reality show The Apprentice and its spin-off The Celebrity Apprentice between 2004 and 2015. Further TV-projects have at times been announced and cancelled, such as Trump Tower (Showtime in 1998 and Lifetime in 2008), The Tower and Trump Takeover.

In February 2005, a parody of Trump ("Donald Grump") appeared on Sesame Street.

Trump makes a cameo appearance as the banker in the September 17, 2007 episode of Deal or No Deal.

Trump appears in the 2010 documentary-drama America: The Story of Us.

In April 2011, Trump attended the White House Correspondents' Dinner, featuring comedian Seth Meyers. President Barack Obama used the occasion to present several prepared jokes mocking Trump. Retrospectively, Trump claimed "I didn't feel humiliated, I had a great time. So the press is very dishonest, they don't report the truth and therefore it's just easier not to go."

In the 2013 Regular Show episode "The Thanksgiving Special", the antagonist Richard Buckner (also referred to as Rich Buckner), a wealthy businessman with distinctive hair, has been identified by multiple sources as a parody of Donald Trump. Storyboard artist Benton Connor, who worked on the episode, later shared original concept drawings of the character and noted the resemblance to Trump.

Trump has been portrayed on Epic Rap Battles of History four times since 2013, being played by Peter Shukoff once and Lloyd Ahlquist thrice. On the show, he first battled against Ebenezer Scrooge; later, he battled against political opponents Hillary Clinton, Joe Biden, and Kamala Harris.

A parody of Trump is president of Canada in a 2015 episode of South Park, "Where My Country Gone?". In later episodes Mr. Garrison changes into a more Trump-like persona when he becomes President of the United States. In 2025, the show returned to a more direct portrayal of Trump in the season 27 premiere "Sermon on the 'Mount" (July 23, 2025). The episode depicts Trump using cut-up photographs of his face on an animated body (mirroring the show's earlier portrayal of Saddam Hussein in South Park: Bigger, Longer & Uncut), shows him in a sexual relationship with Satan, and satirizes both Trump's second presidency and Paramount (the parent company of Comedy Central). The episode drew approximately 5.9 million cross-platform viewers in its first three days and recorded the series' highest linear season-premiere share since 1999. Subsequent episodes of seasons 27 and 28 continued the storyline involving Trump and Satan and parodied other figures in the second Trump administration.

Jimmy Fallon has performed impressions of Trump on The Tonight Show Starring Jimmy Fallon since 2015.

On February 28, 2016, Trump was the subject of a segment of Last Week Tonight with John Oliver that was named after him. The segment, hosted by comedian John Oliver, was critical of Trump. Trump was also featured in later Last Week Tonight segments, including one regarding Trump's plans for a border wall on May 20, and another regarding Trump University.

On The Late Show with Stephen Colbert, Stephen Colbert frequently features a caricature of Trump, called "Cartoon Donald Trump". Colbert's reasoning for including a cartoon version of Trump is because he felt that Trump had resorted to "almost cartoonish tactics". Meanwhile, on Jimmy Kimmel Live!, host Jimmy Kimmel wrote two Dr. Seuss-like books: Winners Aren't Losers and its sequel Winners Still Aren't Losers. Both of these books were featured when Trump was the guest star. On the show, Kimmel would read it out loud to Trump, having Trump read the last word on both occasions.

Vic Berger, a frequent collaborator for the comedy duo Tim & Eric, created a series of Trump related videos for Super Deluxe. Each of these videos remix various Trump debate appearances with air horns and crowds chanting Trump's name.

The 2016 web series You Got Trumped: The First 100 Days takes a darkly comic look at what Trump's first one hundred days in office would look like. The series stars John Di Domenico as Trump and Ron Sparks as Chris Christie, his "whipping boy".

The President Show, starring Anthony Atamanuik as Trump and Peter Grosz as Mike Pence, debuted on Comedy Central on April 27, 2017. Atamanuik started impersonating Trump in 2015. On May 18 2017, Polish-language political satire webseries The Chairman's Ear also featured a parody of Trump, simply referred to as Donald, portrayed by John Weisgerber, in the finally of its first season, titled "Good Donald". In it, he videocalls parody of Jarosław Kaczyński, portrayed by Robert Górski, the leader of the Law and Justice, the ruling party in the government of Poland.

Trump was portrayed negatively in the anime adaptation of Inuyashiki, played by Bill Fleming, where he dismisses the lives that will be lost from an incoming meteor strike. Trump also makes a brief appearance in the anime Devilman Crybaby.

Trump is portrayed by Herson Andrade in the Mexican political parody show El Privilegio de Mandar.

Archived footage of Donald Trump's 2016 U.S. presidential campaign announcement was used in the Arrested Development episode "Self-Deportation" (season 5, episode 2).

The animated television series Talking Tom & Friends features the CEO, also known as Carl, a wealthy businessman and antagonist who bears a striking resemblance to Donald Trump. His residence also resembles Trump Tower.

Family Guy portrayed Trump in a 2019 episode. Peter has been hired by Trump and the family moves to Washington.

Drag Queen The Vivienne appeared as Trump during the Snatch Game challenge of the first series of RuPaul's Drag Race UK. The Vivienne later resumed the role alongside fellow RuPaul's Drag Race UK contestant Baga Chipz as Margaret Thatcher in Morning T&T on WOW Presents Plus.

The character Homelander in the series The Boys has been described by showrunner Eric Kripke as a "Trump analogue," reflecting themes of celebrity, insecurity, ambition, and the intersection of entertainment with authoritarianism. Kripke has stated that the character "has always been a Trump analogue for me." Actor Antony Starr, who portrays Homelander, has noted that while parallels have been drawn, he aimed to develop a more dimensional character rather than a direct caricature.

Brendan Gleeson plays President Trump in the 2020 CBS miniseries, The Comey Rule.

Trump has been portrayed numerous of times on America's Got Talent including by Jeff Trachta as "The Singing Trump" in the show's the twelfth season who advanced past auditions receiving three "yes" votes from the judges was but was later eliminated during the quarterfinals.

The 2020 version of the British puppet show Spitting Image included Trump. Voice actor Matt Forde said "Doing his voice is the most fun I've ever had at work. He's part Trump, part Cartman from South Park." According to the show's producer, NBC decided not to schedule it due to "nervousness".

The 2020 Animaniacs revival included Trump. In one episode, he is the cyclops in a version of the Odyssey.

Trump is parodied in three episodes of Robot Chicken.

=== Memes ===
On May 31, 2017, Trump tweeted, "Despite the constant negative press covfefe". He deleted the tweet six hours later but implied that its wording was intentional. "Covfefe", widely presumed to be a typographical error, instantly became an Internet meme.

"Person, woman, man, camera, TV" is a phrase that then-president Trump used several times during a July 22, 2020, Fox News interview with Marc Siegel, a professor of medicine at New York University. Trump used the phrase while boasting about his performance on and describing part of the Montreal Cognitive Assessment (MoCA), a cognitive test used for detecting cognitive impairment, that he took at Walter Reed National Military Medical Center in 2018. The phrase became an Internet meme and went viral on social media platforms, including Twitter and YouTube.

== Hair ==
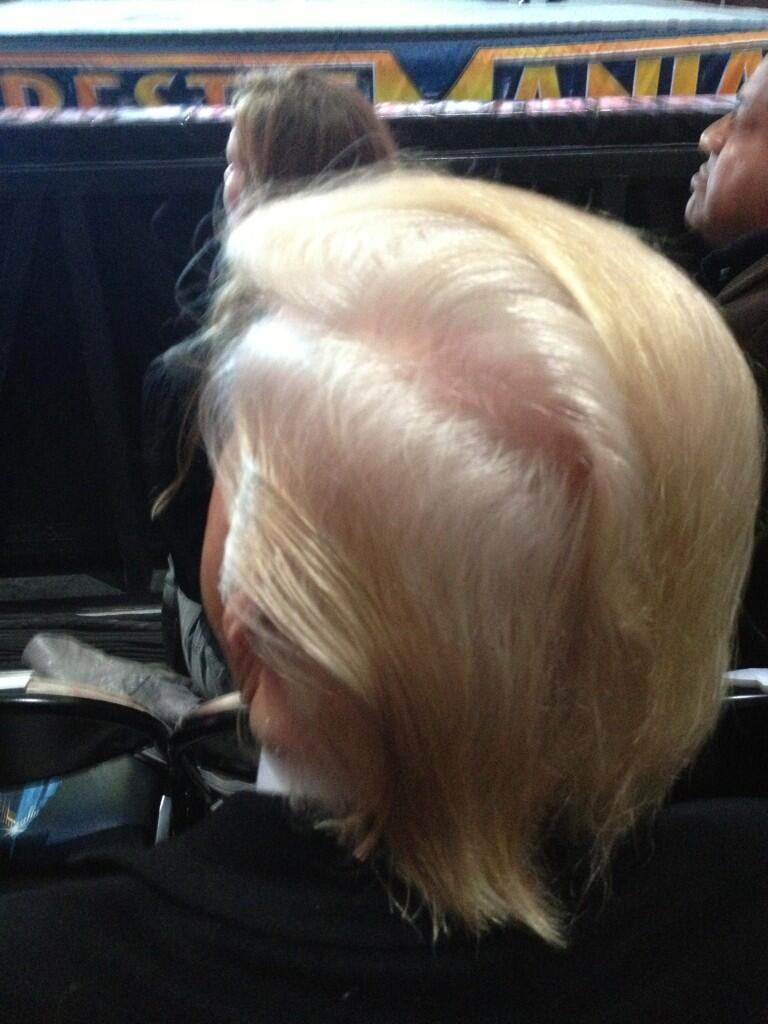
Trump's hairstyle from the back, 2013

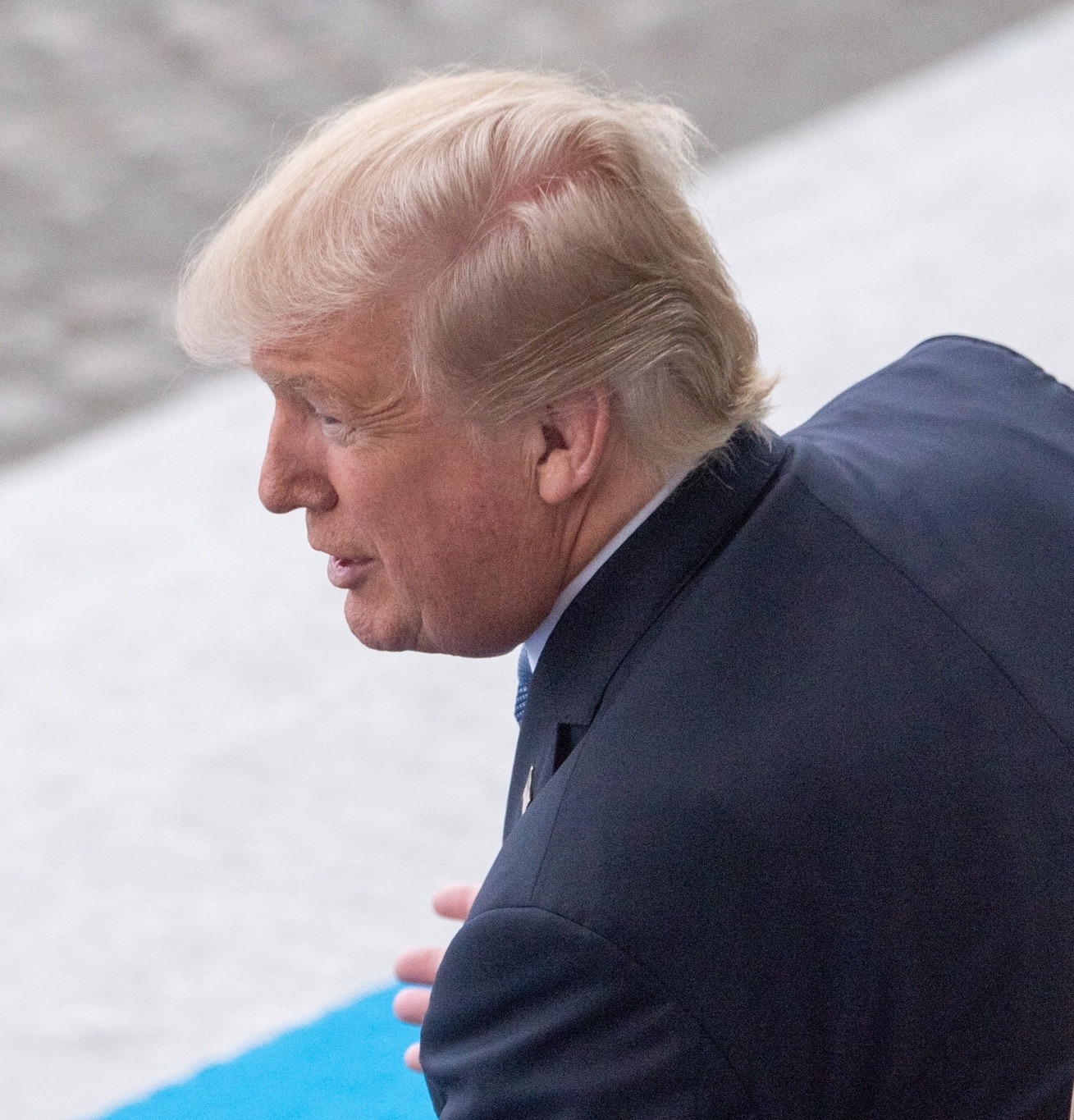
Trump's hairstyle, 2017

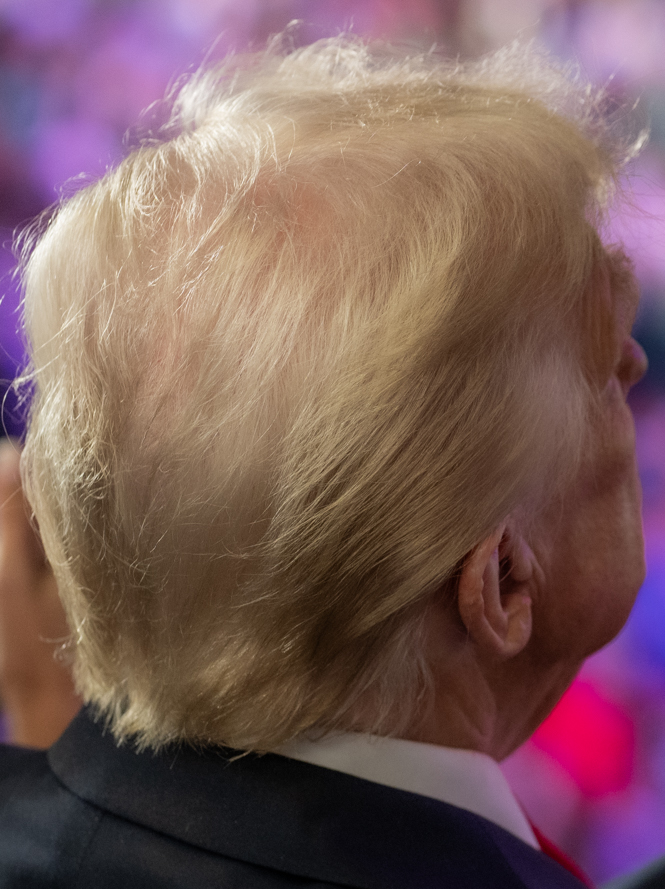
Trump's hairstyle from the back, 2025

Donald Trump's hairstyle has been discussed frequently by the media. His hairstyle has been described as a comb over or triple comb over.

In 2004, the Chicago Tribune wrote that Trump is "known for his gaudy casinos and unusual mane of copper hair". David Letterman made a joke about Trump's hair in 2008, likening it to a Chihuahua. During a 2011 interview with Rolling Stone, Trump said, "I get a lot of credit for comb-overs. But it's not really a comb-over. It's sort of a little bit forward and back. I've combed it the same way for years. Same thing, every time." A gallery of photographs depicting Trump's hairstyle across four decades was published in 2015. In various late-night talk shows and interviews, Trump's hair has humorously been suggested to be a wig, so he has let the interviewers touch his hair to verify its authenticity.

In 2009, singer Kacey Jones released a song titled "Donald Trump's Hair", which reached #1 on ReverbNation's comedy charts.

In early 2011, Vanity Fair wrote that Trump would run for president in 2012, and did a series of pieces satirically comparing the birther controversy over the authenticity of incumbent president Obama's short-form birth certificate to a hypothetical "balders" controversy over the authenticity of Trump's hair. In a June 2015 speech for his 2016 presidential campaign, Trump said he would change his hair style if he were elected. Vanity Fair published two claymation videos making fun of Trump's anthropomorphized hair in late 2015.

In 2017, Ronny Jackson, the physician to the president, stated that Trump took daily doses of Propecia, a branded treatment for the prevention of male-pattern hair loss (MPHL).

In September 2016, Jimmy Fallon invited Donald Trump to be a guest on The Tonight Show Starring Jimmy Fallon. Trump was asked by Fallon if he could mess up his hair. Trump agreed to the offer and allowed Fallon to mess his hair up. Following the hair incident, Fallon was accused by critics that he was humanizing Trump after Trump had pressed more on the zero-tolerance policy under the Trump administration. Trump later tweeted, ".@jimmyfallon is now whimpering to all that he did the famous 'hair show' with me (where he seriously messed up my hair), & that he would have now done it differently because it is said to have 'humanized' me-he is taking heat. He called & said 'monster ratings'. Be a man Jimmy!". Following that tweet, Fallon quickly tweeted back saying that he will donate to the RAICES charity in an effort to help families being separated at the border.

In February 2018, a video shot of Trump boarding Air Force One against a gust of wind clearly showed the comb-over. The video went viral and was critiqued on the internet.

== Skin color ==
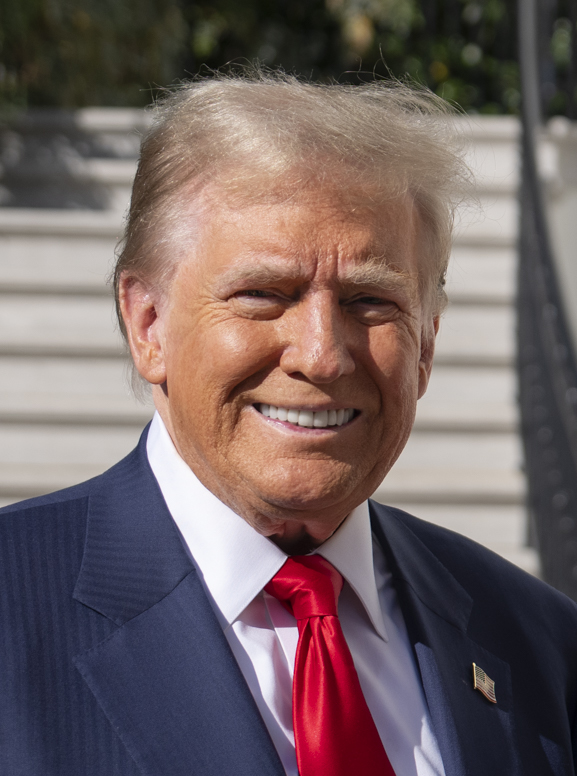
Donald Trump at the White House, November 13, 2024

Comedians and critics of Donald Trump, as well as the media, have often remarked on the color of his skin, considering it unusually orange. This is often ascribed to makeup or tanning agents. Comedian Alec Baldwin, who played a satirized version of Donald Trump on Saturday Night Live, described Trump's look as somewhere in between "Mark Rothko orange" and a "slightly paler Orange Crush", while in 2013, the American comedian Bill Maher offered to pay $5 million to a charity if Donald Trump would produce his birth certificate to prove that Trump's mother had not mated with an orangutan – apparently a reference to Trump's orange hue as well as a response to Trump's previous demands that President Barack Obama produce his birth certificate and other records to disprove conspiracy theories that Obama was born in Kenya. Trump would go on to file a lawsuit against Maher, claiming the comedian owed the promised $5 million, but he dropped the suit two months later.

Trump rarely references his skin tone without being prompted. In a 2019 address to Republican legislators, he said:

The lightbulb. People said: what's with the lightbulb? I said: here's the story. And I looked at it. The bulb that we're being forced to use! Number one, to me, most importantly, the light's no good. I always look orange. And so do you! The light is the worst.

In February 2020, an unverified Twitter account called "White House Photos" posted a photograph of the president, in which Trump's face bore a notable tan line; the image depicted the stark contrast between Trump's seemingly orange facial features and the paler skin around the side of his face. The photograph received widespread attention in the media and on the internet, even inspiring a sketch on Saturday Night Live. Trump himself said the image had been photoshopped. Photos exist of Trump with paler skin, often during morning or while golfing.

== Height ==
Many sources have cast doubt on the claim of Trump being 6 feet 3 inches (191 centimeters) tall, which would make him one of the tallest presidents. While the reports regarding the 6 feet 3 inches (191 centimeters) figure are official, other sources dispute this with estimates ranging from 6 feet 2 inches (188 centimeters) to 5 feet 11 inches (180 centimeters).

== See also ==
- List of things named after Donald Trump
- Media career of Donald Trump
