= Andrew Schafer =

Andrew Shafer may refer to:

- Andrew P. Schafer Jr. (born 1961), U.S. Army general
- Andrew I. Schafer, American hematologist and oncologist

== See also ==
- Andrew Shaffer, American author
