= Wikipedia coverage of Donald Trump =

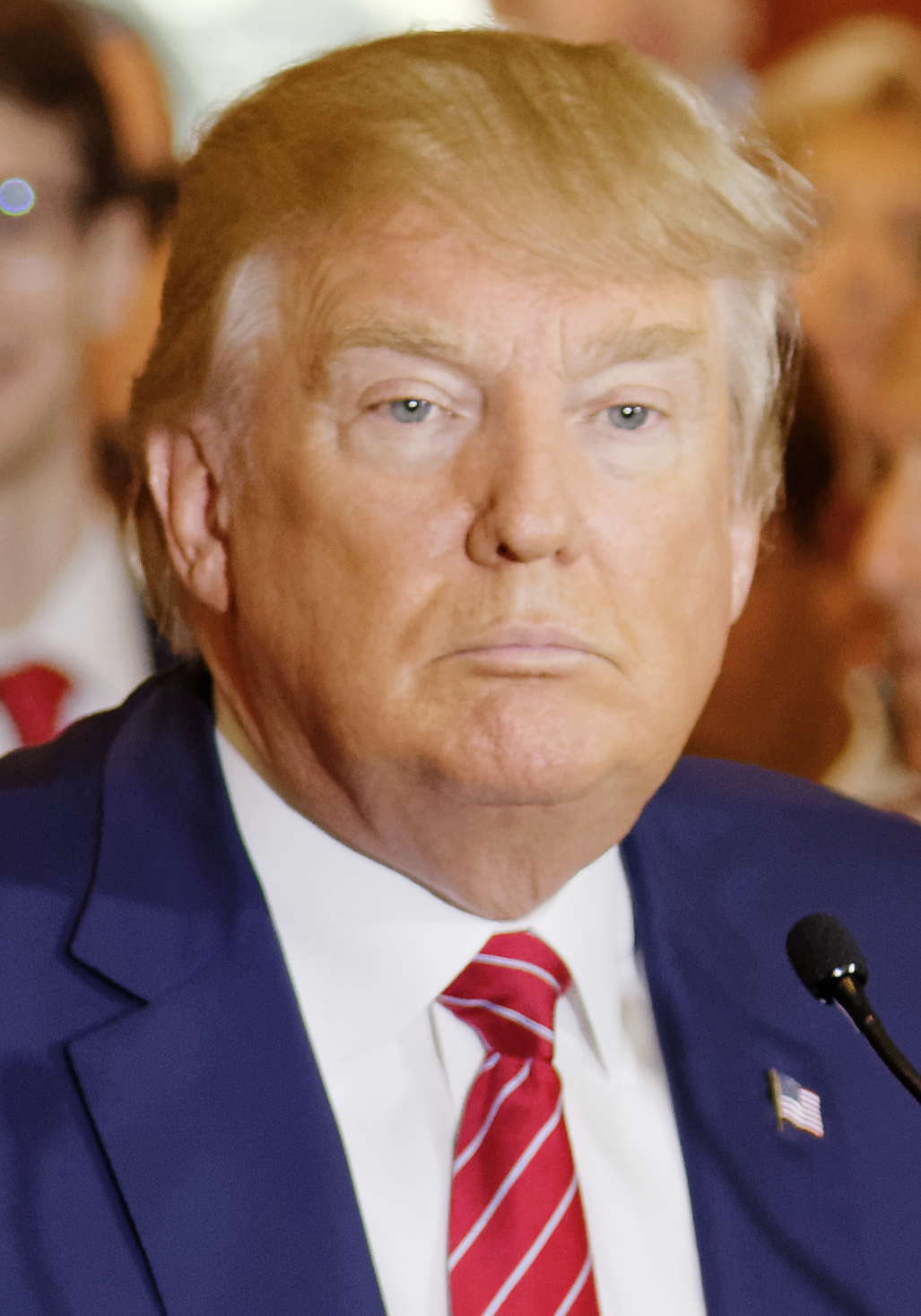
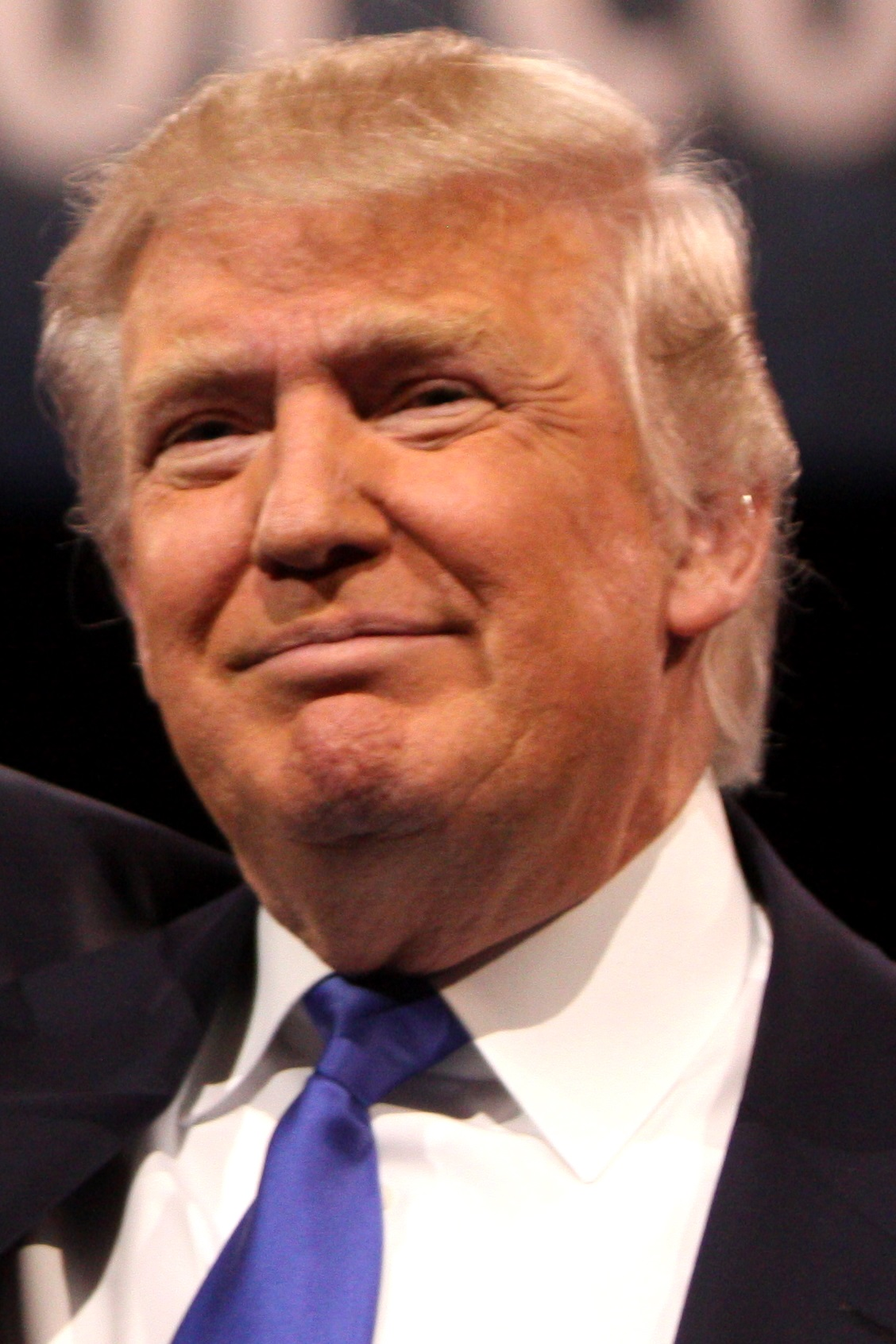
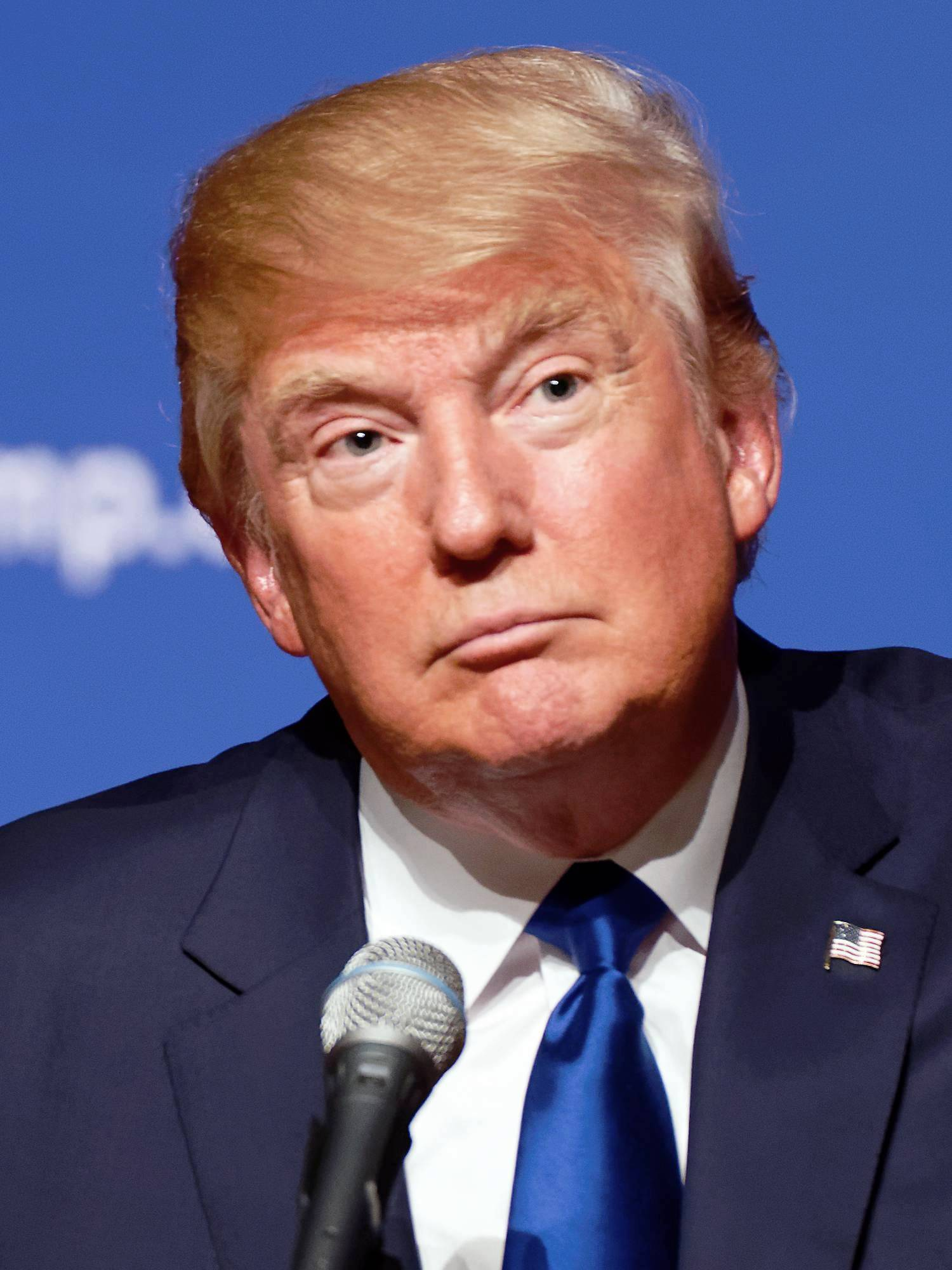
In a 2015 discussion, users debated between an image of Trump staring at the camera (left) and an image of Trump smiling at a CPAC event (center). Editors ultimately chose an alternative image: Trump "listening and expressionless" (right).

Since launching his campaign for the 2016 United States presidential election in 2015, Wikipedia coverage of Donald Trump has been a subject of controversy, largely on the English-language version. Trump's Wikipedia article and related pages have sparked debate between Wikipedia editors, and have also often been vandalized. These actions have resulted in increased media attention and subsequent protection against editing by inexperienced and malicious editors to prevent further vandalism to the articles.

== Wikipedia ==
=== English Wikipedia ===
==== Statistics ====
The English Wikipedia article for Donald Trump was created in 2004. After Trump announced his 2016 United States presidential campaign in June 2015, his article began receiving an increase in edits. In 2015, Trump's article received thousands of edits more than the previous year, and received more edits in January 2016 than other candidates, including Bernie Sanders, Ted Cruz, Marco Rubio and Hillary Clinton. In total, Trump's article received over 10,000 edits from its creation to January 2016. By September of that year, Trump's article had become the 28th most edited for a person on the site. The next month, The Washington Post reported that Trump's page was edited more times in an election cycle than other Republican nominees since 2004. In December, the Wikimedia Foundation noted that Trump's article was the second-most edited on the site in 2016, with 8,933 edits, behind the article for deaths in 2016, which had 18,230 edits. In May 2019, the Trump page had a total of over 28,000 edits. Simultaneously, the page had a total of 156 million views, the most for a biography since Wikipedia began tracking viewership data in December 2007. Since 2015, the Donald Trump article is usually among the 25 most viewed articles on English Wikipedia.

==== Debates ====
During the 2016 United States presidential election, features of Trump's article were frequently debated. The infobox for Trump's article, for instance, featured an image of Trump staring at the camera with lips slightly turned down at the corners. In November 2015, editors debated an alternative image of Trump smiling at a Conservative Political Action Conference (CPAC) event, with accusations of pro-Trump bias towards editors who supported the new image. Ultimately, editors chose a third image lacking expression. In early 2016, several other images were debated, although editors often pointed out drawbacks with each image, such as an unusual expression, a perceived "turkey neck", and objects within the foreground.

Trump's first presidency caused significant gridlock on his article. In one such instance, editors debated the inclusion of the 2018 Russia–United States Summit, with administrators ultimately supporting its inclusion. In the lead section of the article, some editors took issue with the sentence, "Many of his comments and actions have been characterized as racially charged or racist", believing that "racially charged" was ambiguous and potentially euphemistic.

==== Loser.com redirect ====
Following Trump's loss to Ted Cruz in the Iowa Republican presidential caucus in February 2016, the domain Loser.com was changed to redirect to Trump's article. Brian Connelly, who registered the domain in 1995, changed the domain following Trump's proposed travel ban against Muslim majority countries. Although the domain rarely redirected to figures for political purposes, Connelly felt that the "definition of a loser" was "a man who attacks Muslims" and "pushes fear and doubt". By May 2016, Loser.com no longer redirected to the article. When Trump lost the 2020 presidential election in November, the domain once again redirected to Trump's article.

==== Vandalism ====
In July 2015, vandals erased Trump's page, receiving media attention. In one such instance, an editor replaced the contents of the page with "Lets [sic] be fair, nobody cares about him." In March 2016, an IP address used by the Correctional Service of Canada edited the article to state Trump was homosexual, and later homosexual and transgender. Other edits made include replacing mentions of Trump's name with Drumpf, deleting the page and replacing it with profanities, and editing Trump's birthplace to be hell. In spite of this, editors have been able to keep the page stable, preventing a hoax claiming Trump had died of a heart attack from appearing on the page.

On November 22, 2018, the infobox image for Trump was replaced with a penis. The image was returned by Siri when pulling up information on Trump, such as his age. In response, Apple changed Siri to refer to WolframAlpha rather than Wikipedia. The article was fully protected, meaning that only administrators could edit it, from its previous extended confirmed protection status, requiring editors to have a specified number of edits and time on the site. In the days that followed, attackers used hacked user accounts, including of an administrator, to replace the image. The vandalism occurred several days after the Wikimedia Foundation overhauled its security for administrators; two-factor authentication was made mandatory for some administrators, although the latter still did not prevent the attacks. In response, the Wikimedia Foundation changed its rules to prevent administrators from unblocking themselves. Termed the "nuclear option", the move attracted significant controversy.

==== Articles related to Trump ====
An article for Trump's impeachment was created in November 2016 on the word of two academics, who predicted Trump would be impeached upon taking office; the article was deleted hours later. Trump would later be impeached twice but would be acquitted by the Senate both times.

A multitude of Trump-related articles were created throughout Trump's presidency. Following the 2017 Riyadh summit, internet users turned images released of the event featuring Trump touching an illuminated globe into an Internet meme; an article for the meme was created a day later. On January 6, 2021, Wikipedia editor Jason Moore created the article for the January 6 United States Capitol attack titled "January 2021 Donald Trump rally". As the attack unfolded, hundreds of editors worked towards expanding the article. There were also several disputes among editors as to what terminology should be used to describe the attack; another editor retitled the article to "2021 storming of the United States Capitol".

In August 2023, editors engaged in a contentious debate on whether or not an article for Trump's mug shot should exist. The article's proponents argued that the mug shot was a historical photograph, which some opponents questioned. Other opponents suggested merging the article to an article for the prosecution of election racketeering in Georgia, where Trump had his mug shot taken.

In May 2024, after Trump was found guilty of 34 felony charges in New York, editors held a discussion on whether the words "convicted felon" should be included in his article's first sentence.

==== Articles loosely related to Trump ====
Anything and everything Trump. His name comes up in articles you wouldn't imagine—including the article Fuck. LOL.

— Betty Wills, a Wikipedia editor, when asked "which topics tended to be the most challenging when it comes to battling falsities and half-truths"

On October 7, 2016, Trump released a video alleging that Bill Clinton had abused women and that Hillary Clinton had bullied her husband's victims; six days later, a vandal replaced the contents of the Clintons' articles with a pornographic image and explicit message, making similar allegations and encouraging readers to vote for Trump.

Beginning in November, the article for the heights of presidents and presidential candidates stirred controversy when editors disagreed on Trump's height; while most agreed that Trump was at least six feet tall, his exact height was disputed for the next two years. While some editors believed Trump is 6 feet 2 inches (188 cm) based on a driver's license, others contested he was 6 feet 3 inches (191 cm) based on a White House doctor.

Shortly before Trump's inauguration on January 20, 2017, editors changed the article for the president of the United States repeatedly, with the article ultimately declaring Trump president at 12:00 p.m. Eastern Time.

During the July 2019 rally at Williams Arena at Minges Coliseum, Trump campaign manager Brad Parscale claimed that 20,000 attendees were at the rally, but the Williams Arena seats only 8,000 people. Parscale later clarified that the number included people outside of the venue and people at Pitt–Greenville Airport. In spite of this, a user changed the seating capacity in the infobox of Williams Arena's page from 8,000 people to 20,000. Following Trump's first impeachment in December, an editor edited the article for Home Alone 2: Lost in New York (1992)—in which Trump cameos in as the owner of the Plaza Hotel—to state that Trump was the first cast member of the film to be impeached. Another editor edited the article for the United States Senate to claim that "[The Senate] died on January 31, 2020", when the Senate voted to acquit Trump.

=== Chinese Wikipedia ===
In June 2017, students at Northwestern University and the University of Minnesota, Twin Cities, presented a research paper on articles-as-concepts. The article for Trump's family was used as an example of the drawbacks of Wikipedia articles-as-concepts. On Chinese Wikipedia, the article for Trump's family did not exist, leaving the only source of family information as the article for Trump himself. In comparison, English Wikipedia covers the family in far greater detail.

== Wikimedia Commons ==
In June 2017, a request to Wikimedia Commons claimed that the White House's official portrait of Trump for his first inauguration was not the work of the United States government, but rather a photographer known as Doug Coulter, and thus did not qualify for public domain status.

== See also ==
- Wikipedia coverage of American politics

== Works cited ==
- Yilun Lin, Allen; Yu, Bowen; Hall, Andrew; Hecht, Brent (2017). Problematizing and Addressing the Article-as-Concept Assumption in Wikipedia (PDF). Wikimedia Research. Wikimedia Foundation. Archived from the original (PDF) on October 29, 2023.
