= Tiffany Reisz =

American writer

Tiffany Reisz is an American author. She is best known for the Original Sinners series of erotica and she has won the RITA Award and a Lambda Literary Award.

Reisz is best known for writing the Original Sinners series, published by Harlequin imprint Mira Books. Called "smart smut" by NPR and "Fifty Shades for adults" by Salon, Reisz's work is known for its witty depictions of sex and heavy use of religious imagery and themes. In 2014, USA Today championed Reisz for her diverse characters.Reisz is Catholic and attended Asbury Theological Seminary and Centre College. She lives in Louisville, Kentucky with her husband, novelist Andrew Shaffer.

== Publications ==
=== The Original Sinners series ===
The Original Sinners series comprises nine full-length, erotica novels:

- The Siren
- The Angel
- The Prince
- The Mistress
- The Saint - RITA Award winner for erotic romance
- The King - Lambda Literary Award winner (gay erotica category)
- The Virgin
- The Queen
- The Priest

The series also includes 14 stand-alone, "series adjacent" novellas; a prequel; and four collection anthologies, including RITA Award finalist Picture Perfect Cowboy.

=== Additional works ===
Other works by Reisz include:

- The Godwicks romance novel series
  - The Red - An NPR Best Book of the Year
  - The Rose
  - The Pearl
  - The Beguiling of Merlin
- The Men at Work series, published by Harlequin Blaze
  - Her Halloween Treat
  - Her Naughty Holiday
  - Ian's Forbidden Dream Girl
  - One Hot December - Romance Times Reviewers' Choice Award for Best Series Romance
- Two erotica novellas published as part of the Cosmo Red Hot Reads project
  - Misbehaving
  - Seize the Night
- Four gothic stand-alone romance novels
  - The Bourbon Thief
  - The Headmaster - RITA Award finalist for contemporary romance
  - The Lucky Ones
  - The Night Mark - RITA Award finalist for mainstream fiction with a central romance
