= Hope Rides Again =

Detective book

Hope Rides Again: An Obama Biden Mystery is a 2019 book by Andrew Shaffer, published by Quirk Books. It is a sequel to Hope Never Dies, and is part of a series of books in which Joe Biden and Barack Obama are detectives solving crimes. Shaffer stated that the series is "escapist".

The content is told in the first person perspective by Biden. He and Obama look for a person who took Obama's mobile device. According to Dean Poling of the Valdosta Daily Times, Obama is the equivalent of Sherlock Holmes and Biden is the equivalent of Dr. Watson.

== Reception ==
Kirkus Reviews wrote that the concept is "silly", and that the Biden character is "moralizing and generalizing" and not as "humorous" compared to that of the first novel.

Publishers Weekly described the work as "humorous" and stated that the book's positioning of Obama and Biden as protagonists in an action-oriented story was "convincing".

Poling compared the work to works by Kinky Friedman.

== See also ==
- The Day of the Donald
