= Hope Never Dies =

2018 novel by Andrew Shaffer

Hope Never Dies: An Obama Biden Mystery
- Author: Andrew Shaffer
- Language: English
- Publisher: Quirk Books
- Publication date: 2018

Hope Never Dies: An Obama Biden Mystery is a 2018 novel by Andrew Shaffer, published by Quirk Books.

The work of fiction is about Joe Biden and Barack Obama, now no longer politicians, working as a team to investigate the death of an Amtrak conductor.

Alexandra Alter of The New York Times described it as "political fanfiction" and "an escapist fantasy".

Its sequel is Hope Rides Again (2019).

== Background ==
Shaffer stated that he chose Biden as the narrator because he felt "it fit the noir narration" and that it was "much easier to get into Joe's head" (understand his personality) compared to Obama's personality. Dean Poling of the Valdosta Daily Times described it as a "grouchy, dad-joke vibe".

== Contents ==
The book is told in the first person perspective from Biden's point of view. Brian Truitt of USA Today stated that the work "has a definite Democratic bent."

Alter stated that, in the book, Obama functions like Sherlock Holmes and Biden functions like Dr. Watson. Kirkus Reviews described the Obama character as "a reasonable stand-in for Sherlock Holmes", while the Biden character is "appealingly modest and laughably self-satisfied".

== Reception ==
Alter described it as "a surprisingly earnest story".

Publishers Weekly stated that people who read works by Carl Hiaasen would enjoy this book.

Kirkus Reviews stated that it has an "unsatisfying" ending and that the secrets being uncovered by Obama and Biden are "wafer-thin".

USA Today ranked the book three stars out of four.

Maureen Corrigan, an instructor of literature at Georgetown University, wrote in the Washington Post that the storyline was "drowsy", and that the work is "sweetly goofy".

== See also ==
- The Day of the Donald
