= Loser.com =

URL redirection website

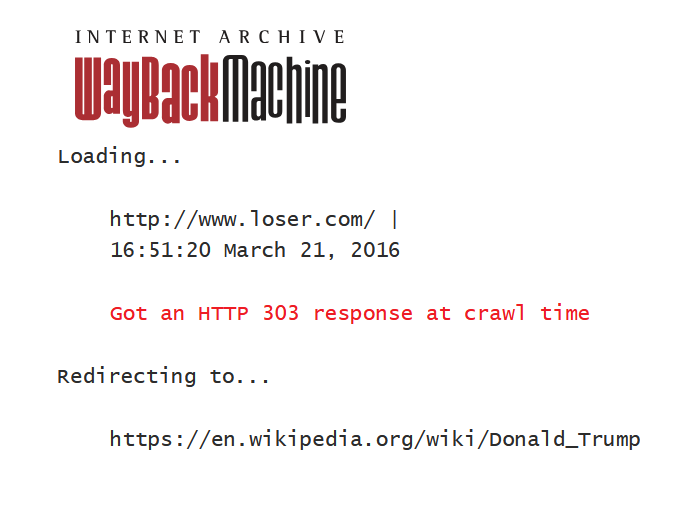
A loading screen of the Wayback Machine as it redirects the given URL to Donald Trump's Wikipedia article

Loser.com is a domain name that has existed as a URL redirect to several different web pages during most of its existence. The website was initially registered in 1995 by Brian Connelly, who used the URL to redirect to websites relating to various American politicians, political campaigns, and organizations.

== History ==
The Loser.com domain name was registered in 1995 by Brian Connelly.

It redirected to the website of the 2000 presidential campaign of Al Gore; a website opposing former Governor of South Carolina Jim Hodges in much of 2002; the presidential campaign of Barack Obama in 2008; (Note: "That wasn't against Obama's election!" Connelly said. "That was just getting people to register.") WikiLeaks in 2010; an article about American politician Sean Duffy in 2011; and the Reddit website in 2012. According to Connelly, the website sometimes redirects to topics he considers positive to increase their traffic.

The domain name gained mainstream coverage in March 2015, when it redirected to the English Wikipedia entry for American rapper Kanye West. Marlow Stern of The Daily Beast suggested that the redirect was done in response to West's reactions to American singer Beck's album Morning Phase winning Album of the Year at the 57th Annual Grammy Awards. Ryan Gajewski of The Hollywood Reporter and Christopher Hooton of The Independent both suggested that the domain name was a Beck reference because "Loser" is one of Beck's most popular songs. In an interview with Stern on March 5, Connelly admitted that he had a negative impression of West and intended the redirection as a troll attempt on the rapper.

In February 2016, the website redirected to the English Wikipedia entry for then-US presidential candidate Donald Trump after he placed second in the Iowa caucus. Defending the move, Connelly described Trump as "a man who attacks Muslims, who attacks Muslim Americans, who pushes fear and doubt" and "the definition of a loser".

When asked about his motives with his redirects, Connelly said the year 2000 redirect to losing Tennessee gubernatorial candidate Bill Daley's website was because "I think he was anti-gay". He had "no comment" about the 2002 redirect to an opposition site targeting South Carolina Governor Jim Hodges.

On November 8, 2020, it again redirected to the English Wikipedia entry for Donald Trump, as Trump refused to concede the 2020 United States presidential election after being defeated by Joe Biden, the 47th Vice President of the United States and President of the United States-elect.

In March 2022, it redirected to the Wikipedia article of Vladimir Putin.

In December 2022, it redirected to Twitter.com.

In early 2024, it again redirected to the English Wikipedia entry for Donald Trump until as early as May 18. As of July 2025, it is parked.
