= Point the Finger =

1989 comic book story

- Cover of Hup issue #3
- Story: Robert Crumb
- Ink: Robert Crumb
- Date: November 1989
- Pages: 6

"Point the Finger" is a 1989 comic book story written and illustrated by American cartoonist Robert Crumb for Last Gasp. The story appeared in the third of the four issue series of his solo title Hup. In the story, Crumb goes after then real estate businessman Donald Trump and imagines having an argument with him. Two possible endings are shown to the reader. In one, Crumb is arrested by the police for having wasted Trump's time; in the second ending, two women give Trump a swirlie in the toilet. Critics described the story as both sexist and prescient. The comic received additional attention in 2016, when Trump was elected president of the United States.

== Background ==
In the 1980s, American cartoonist Robert Crumb often satirized the culture of the United States in his work. He refined his underground art style by drawing inspiration from older works, such as those of 16th century Flemish artist Pieter Bruegel the Elder. At the time, the Crumbs were living in Winters, California, but they became increasingly unhappy with the changing culture in the United States. Ronald Reagan's presidency led to the resurgence of the Christian right, who were now attacking Crumb for his art. Reagan's budget cuts, particularly to education, also eliminated art and music programs at their daughter's school. The Crumbs volunteered to teach drawing classes, but participation dwindled after a local minister accused them of being "agents of the devil." Unsatisfied with the transformation the United States had undergone from the counterculture of the 1960s to the culture of the 1980s, the Crumb family left California two years after the publication of "Point the Finger" and moved to a village in Southern France.

== Development ==
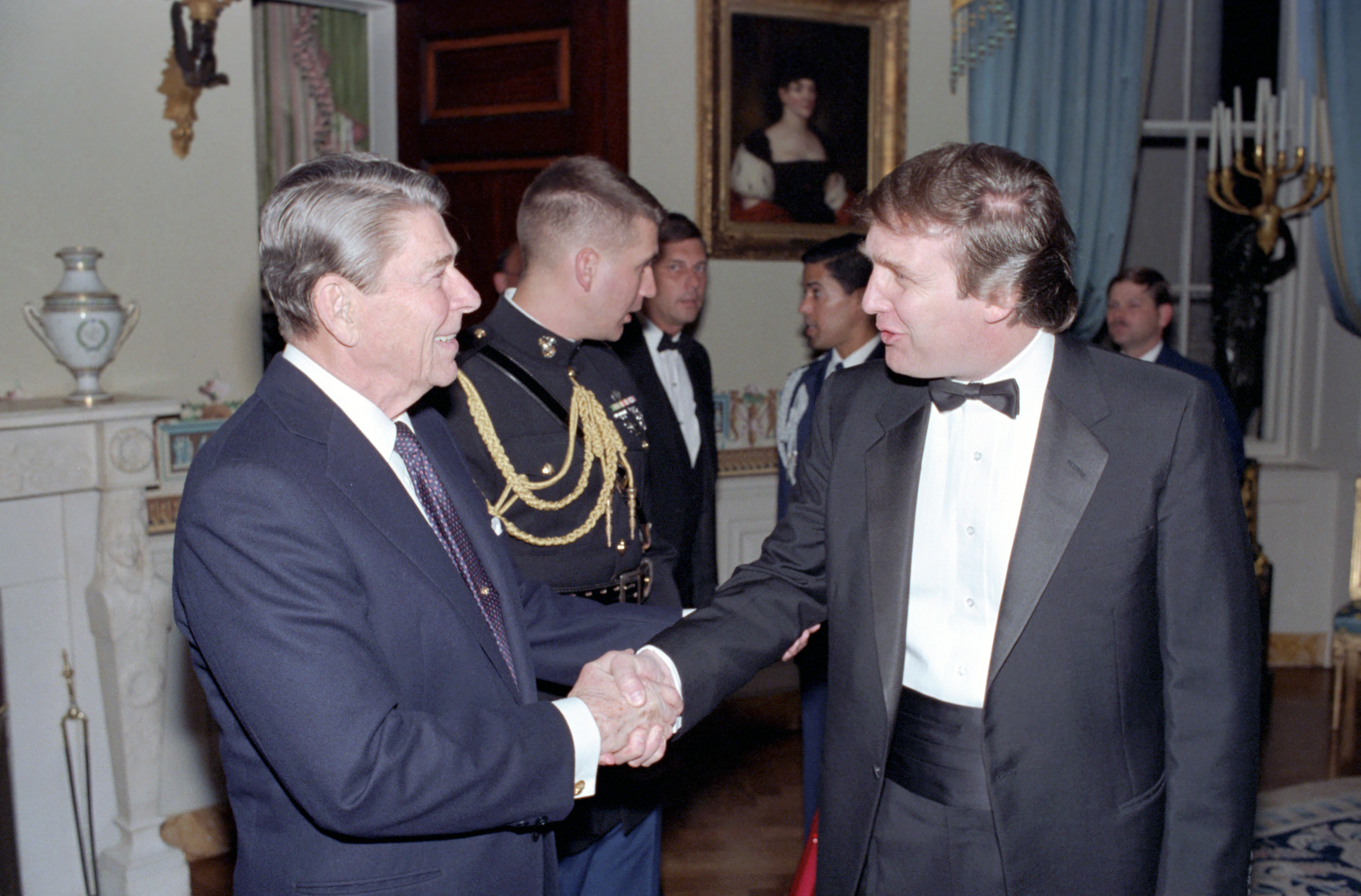
Reagan and Trump (1987)

In 1987, Donald Trump's book Trump: The Art of the Deal, ghostwritten by a subsequently remorseful Tony Schwartz, became a bestseller. American cartoonist Robert Crumb read Trump's book and disliked it. He thought Trump came off as an "arrogant, reprehensible, total dick"; this inspired him to develop the story for "Point the Finger". Crumb created the story during the late 1980s, when Trump was known for his real estate business ventures, not his politics; the story is therefore not, as Romain Becker of the Ecole Normale Supérieure notes, about the politics of the United States, but rather a commentary on its financial system. Years later, Crumb rethought the framing of the original story, thinking that he gave "too much credit [to Trump] for possessing a bit of class and sophistication"; Crumb came to believe Trump was more of a thug instead.

Crumb uses his typical monochromatic, crosshatched, pen-and-ink style. (Note: Alan Pipes: "Crumb works almost exclusively in black line and is a master of painstakingly intricate cross-hatching.") Five of the six pages in the comic use six square panels per page, while the sequence on page three uses seven panels.

== Plot ==
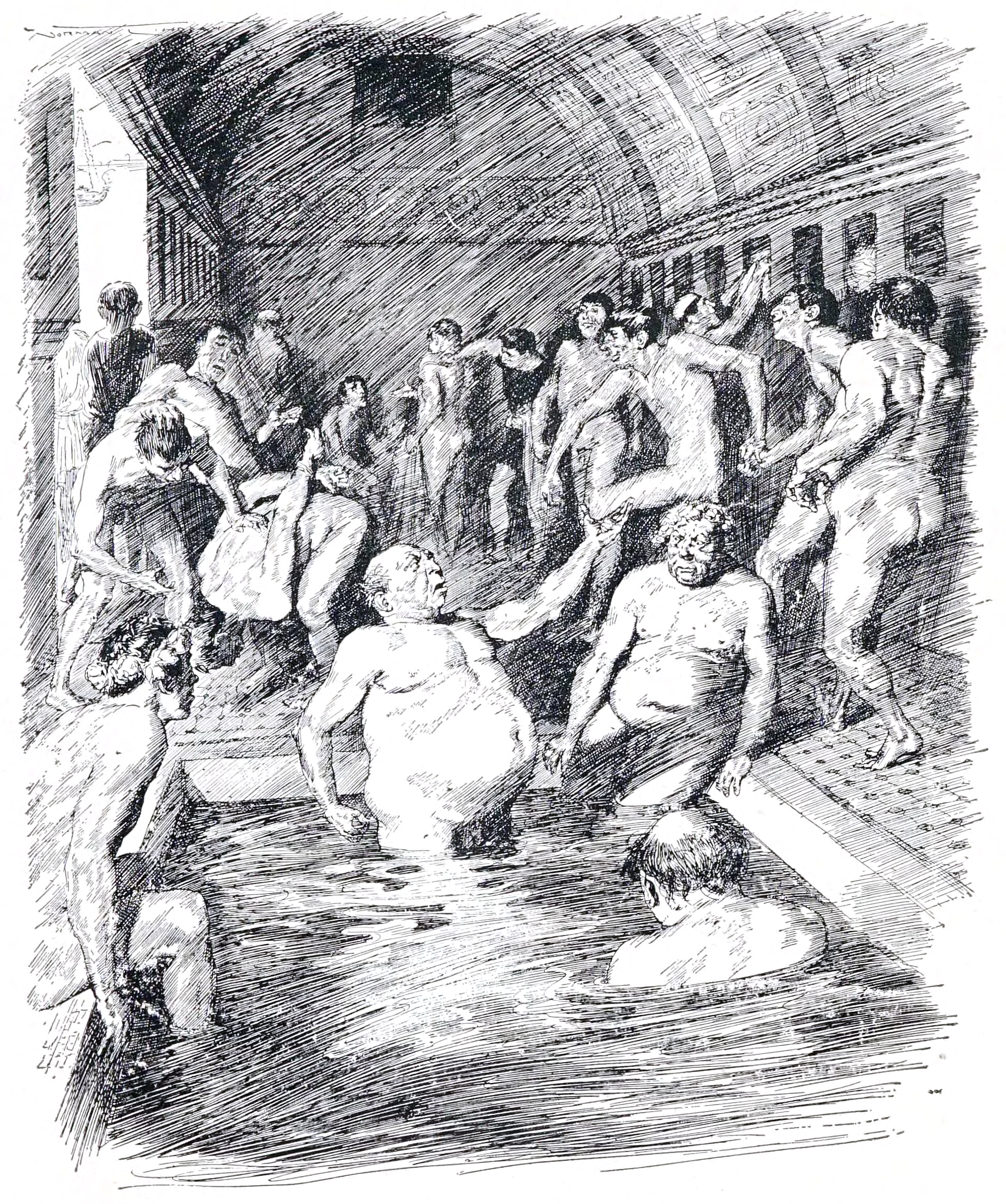
Trimalchio by Norman Lindsay (1922)

Crumb addresses the reader to explain that he is "going to point that merciless finger at one of the more visible of the big-time predators who feed on this society..one of the most evil men alive...real estate tycoon Donald Trump". Trump is brought into the panel by two women, Tracy and Marny, while Trump and Crumb trade barbs. Crumb brings up Trump's history of controversial evictions, while Trump defends himself by claiming he donated millions to the homeless. Crumb loses to Trump, as the then 42-year-old real estate developer uses his wiles and charisma to attract the two women into his orbit and invites them to a party at Mar-a-Lago. Crumb suddenly realizes that Trump is the living, modern-day embodiment of Trimalchio, a character from the Roman work of fiction Satyricon by Petronius (c. AD 27 – 66). The women happily leave with Trump just as the police arrive to arrest Crumb, guns drawn, leaving the reader with a sad quote from Laozi about the difference between the ways of nature and man. But just as the story has finished, Stan-the-Man Shnooter (a metafictional character parody of comic book editors Stan Lee and Jim Shooter) appears, encouraging Crumb to change the ending. The reader demands, Shnooter tells Crumb, "justice, retribution, [and] blood". Crumb gives in to his editor and a new ending is shown; this time, Crumb wins, as Trump is escorted to the restroom by the two women and given a swirlie in the toilet.

== Critical reception ==
Associate professor of English and author Stephen Hock revisited Crumb's treatment of Trump in "Point the Finger" sometime after 2016, noting that it was part of a largely unstudied body of work he calls "Trump fiction". This category features Trump as a high-profile individual in popular culture before he became president; Hock refers to this as "cultural prehistory". Works of this type, along with Crumb's "Point the Finger", include books like the satirical horror novel American Psycho (1991) by Bret Easton Ellis, The Submission (2011) by Amy Waldman, and Bleeding Edge (2013) by Thomas Pynchon.

Hock argues that in "Point the Finger", Crumb neglects to explore the greater role of Trump and Trumpism itself within American history and society, favoring a discussion of Trump's personality and identity instead. Crumb fails, writes Hock, to actually discuss "the injustices of the system" he tells the reader he is going to do, only briefly touching upon it by showing a panel where the police are working closely with Trump to go after Crumb. Hock finds this panel reminiscent of Trump's involvement that same year with the Central Park Five, where he took out a newspaper ad that said "Bring Back the Death Penalty. Bring Back Our Police!"

Daniel Worden notes that in both endings, male figures assert dominance over each other as well as the females, lessening the difference between the endings. "Crumb projects himself as a countercultural, outsider hero who does not conform to traditional standards of masculinity," writes Worden, but this image is an illusion. Edward Shannon writes that "Crumb positions himself as a lone (and often impotent) defender of the oppressed—a victim of the fascists he just as often wishes to emulate". This image is described as an example of "geek masculinity" by Anastasia Salter and Bridget Blodgett, where "relationships between men and women within geek media are defined according to deeply gendered beliefs despite existing as a response to traditional masculinity". Seen in this light, Worden notes that the nontraditional masculinity espoused by Crumb is based on regressive gender norms which cannot escape its traditional masculinity.

The comic received additional attention in 2016, when Trump was elected president of the United States. Cory Doctorow describes the story as "weird, self-deprecating, sexist, and before its time. Long before 'Make America Great Again'," writes Doctorow, "Crumb had Trump's number."

== Publishing history ==
"Point the Finger" was originally published in November 1989 by Last Gasp in San Francisco. It appeared in the third installment of a four issue series of Hup released from 1986 to 1992. The story was included along with " Stan-The-Man Shnooter", " The Story O' My Life", "Nausea", "Hup! We Get Letters!!", and "He's A Natural Man!" The cover design is based on a panel from "The Story O' My Life". The first edition contained 36 pages and appeared in standard comic book size with a cover price of US$2.50. Over the years, "Point the Finger" was reprinted and published at least seven times: in Spain (1990), Sweden (1991), the Netherlands (1992), the United Kingdom (1994), in the U.S. (1995, 2014), and in Germany (2019). The UK reprint was published by Knockabout Comics in 1994 in an issue titled R. Crumb's America, featuring an image by Crumb of an outline of the United States on its cover. This image featured the face of an overweight, ill-natured man embedded within its borders, which was illustrated with a version of the United States flag set against a mint-colored background. The German reprint was first published by Reprodukt in February 2019. They used the same image formerly published by Knockabout as the cover of an anthology titled Amerika, but changed the background from mint to orange and added wavy odor lines emanating from the image along with people fleeing from it. These changes gave the impression that the image represented Donald Trump.

== Notes and references ==
Notes
