= Heights of presidents and presidential candidates of the United States =

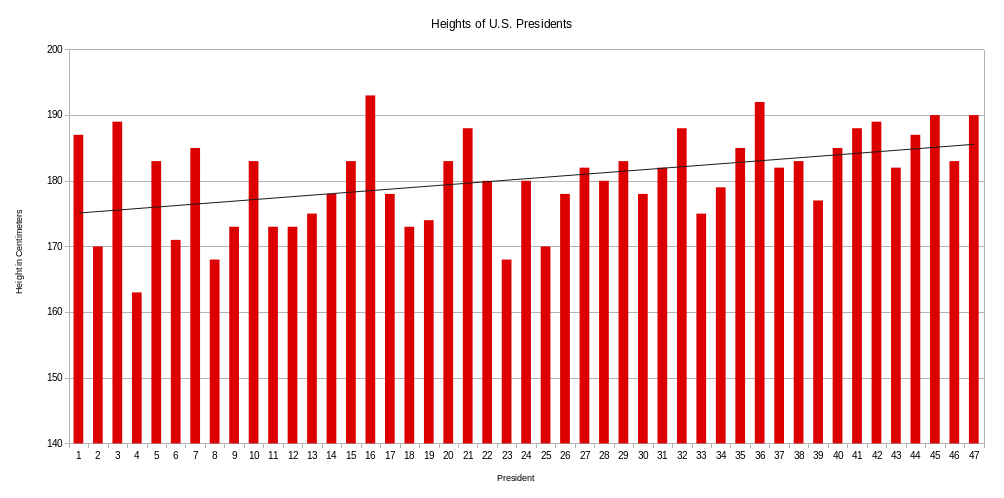
Presidents have trended to be taller over time, as shown using linear trend estimation.

A record of the heights of the presidents and presidential candidates of the United States is useful for evaluating what role, if any, height plays in presidential elections in the United States. Some observers have noted that the taller of the two major-party candidates tends to prevail, and argue this is due to the public's preference for taller candidates.

The tallest U.S. president was Abraham Lincoln at 6 feet 4 inches (193 centimeters), while the shortest was James Madison at 5 feet 4 inches (163 centimeters). The average height of the 45 U.S. presidents is approximately 5 feet 11 inches (180 centimeters).

Donald Trump, the current president, is listed as 6 feet 3 inches (191 centimeters) tall according to the White House physician (as of May 2026). Trump's height is disputed; he is generally considered shorter than his officially listed height. JD Vance, the current vice president, is reportedly 6 feet 2 inches (188 centimeters) tall.

== Electoral success as a function of height ==
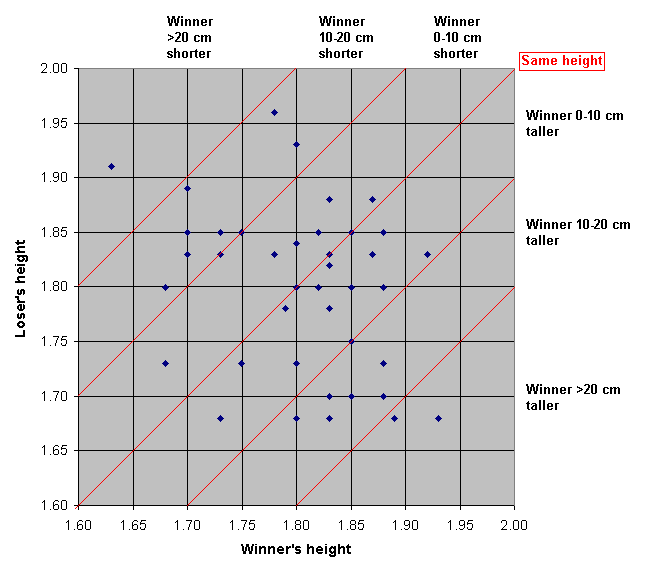
Graph of winner vs. loser heights in presidential elections, 1789–2004

Folk wisdom about U.S. presidential politics holds that the taller of the two major-party candidates always wins or almost always wins since the advent of the televised presidential debate. The topic is also popular among essayists and popular science writers.

A number of studies have been published, but many have methodological issues, including varied and unjustified date ranges from which elections are sampled in order to calculate percentages of elections in which taller candidates have won. One 2001 study approached the issue by measuring the support of candidates in terms of popular votes, giving evidence for an advantage for taller candidates. Other studies have also compared presidential height to the average height of the population.

According to a 2013 study, significantly taller candidates were more likely to win the popular vote, while they were not more likely to win U.S. presidential elections: the number of taller candidates who won elections did not differ in a statistically significant manner from chance. It also found that the winning probability of the taller candidate increases to the present day, affecting studies which only analyze elections from the recent past.

=== Mentions in popular culture ===
- In Ray Bradbury's 1953 dystopian novel Fahrenheit 451, when Mildred and her friends discuss the success of one presidential candidate over the other in a recent election, they talk only about the attractiveness of the winning candidate over the loser. One of their points is "You just don't go running a little short man like that against a tall man."
- A 1975 book called First Impressions: The Psychology of Encountering Others notes: "Elevator Shoes, Anyone? One factor which has a far-reaching influence on how people are perceived, at least in American society, is height. From 1900 to 1968 the man elected U.S. president was always the taller of the two candidates. (Richard Nixon was slightly shorter than George McGovern.)"
- A 1978 book titled The Psychology of Person Identification states: "They also say that every President of the USA elected since the turn of the [20th] century has been the taller of the two candidates (Jimmy Carter being an exception)."
- A 1988 article in the Los Angeles Times fashion section about a haberdasher devoted to clothing shorter men included a variation of the tale: "Stern says he just learned that Dukakis is 5 feet, 8 inches. 'Did you know,' he adds, noticeably disappointed, 'that since 1900 the taller of the two candidates always wins?'"
- A 1997 book called How to Make Anyone Fall in Love with You discusses the issue in a section about the importance of height: "What about height? One assumes the taller the better, because our culture venerates height. In fact, practically every president elected in the United States since 1900 was the taller of the two candidates."
- A 1999 book, Survival of the Prettiest by Nancy Etcoff, repeated a version of the legend in a section on the power of heights: "... Since 1776 only [two Presidents,] James Madison and Benjamin Harrison[,] have been below-average height. The easiest way to predict the winner in a United States election is to bet on the taller man: in this century you would have had an unbroken string of hits until 1972 when Richard Nixon beat George McGovern."
- A chapter titled "Epistemology at the Core of Postmodernism" in the 2002 book Telling the Truth: Evangelizing Postmodernisms makes this observation: "I remember the subversive effect the observation had on me that in every U.S. presidential race, the taller of the two candidates had been elected. It opened up space for a counterdiscourse to the presumed rationality of the electoral process."
- The height of Donald Trump has repeatedly come under question and is common topic in popular culture about Trump. Trump claims he is 6 feet 3 inches (191 centimeters) but older documents indicate 6 feet 2 inches (188 centimeters) and some estimates for him are as low as 5 feet 11 inches (180 centimeters).

== U.S. presidents by height order ==
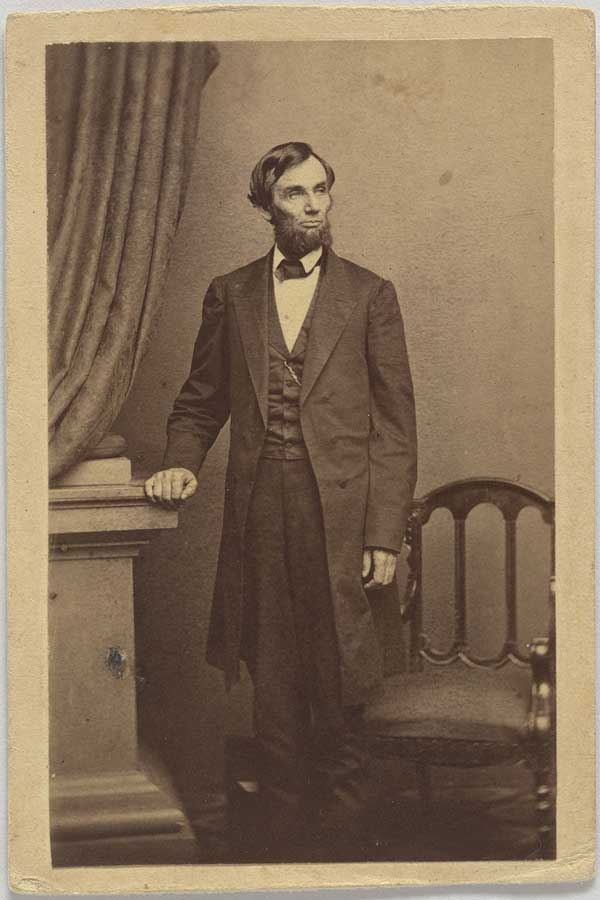
Abraham Lincoln, the tallest president, was 6 ft 4 in (193 cm).

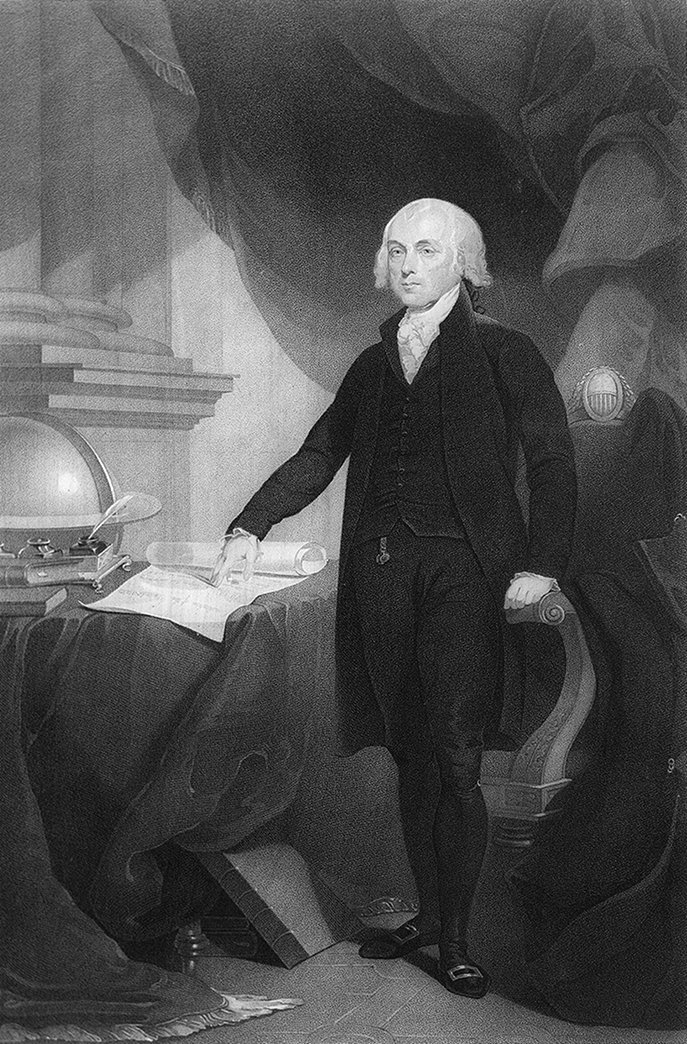
James Madison, the shortest president, was 5 ft 4 in (163 cm).

Rank	№	President	Height (imperial)	Height (metric)	Ref.
1	16	Abraham Lincoln	6 ft 4 in	193 cm	
2	36	Lyndon B. Johnson	6 ft 3 1/2 in	192 cm	(Note: Lyndon B. Johnson measured 6 ft 2 1/2 in (189 cm) according to a report of physical examination from October 1941.)
3	45, 47	Donald Trump	6 ft 3 in	191 cm	(Note: Other public records, including Trump's 2012 driver's license, give his height as 6 ft 2 in (188 cm).)
4	3	Thomas Jefferson	6 ft 2 1/2 in	189 cm	
5	21	Chester A. Arthur	6 ft 2 in	188 cm	
5	32	Franklin D. Roosevelt	6 ft 2 in	188 cm	(Note: Roosevelt's 1918 passport recorded his height as 6 ft 1/2 in (184 cm).)
5	41	George H. W. Bush	6 ft 2 in	188 cm	
5	42	Bill Clinton	6 ft 2 in	188 cm	
9	1	George Washington	6 ft 1 1/2 in	187 cm	(Note: Washington once stated that he stood 6 ft 0 in (183 cm) tall.)
9	44	Barack Obama	6 ft 1 1/2 in	187 cm	(Note: Obama's 2011 and 2014 physical examinations recorded his height as 6 ft 1 in (185 cm).)
11	7	Andrew Jackson	6 ft 1 in	185 cm	
11	35	John F. Kennedy	6 ft 1 in	185 cm	(Note: Kennedy's height was recorded as 5 ft 11 1/2 in (182 cm) and 6 ft 0 in (183 cm) in separate physical examinations conducted in 1941.)
11	40	Ronald Reagan	6 ft 1 in	185 cm	
14	5	James Monroe	6 ft 0 in	183 cm	
14	10	John Tyler	6 ft 0 in	183 cm	
14	15	James Buchanan	6 ft 0 in	183 cm	
14	20	James A. Garfield	6 ft 0 in	183 cm	
14	29	Warren G. Harding	6 ft 0 in	183 cm	
14	38	Gerald Ford	6 ft 0 in	183 cm	
14	46	Joe Biden	6 ft 0 in	183 cm	(Note: In 1984, The New York Times reported Biden's height as 6 ft 1 in (185 cm).)
21	27	William Howard Taft	5 ft 11 1/2 in	182 cm	
21	31	Herbert Hoover	5 ft 11 1/2 in	182 cm	
21	37	Richard Nixon	5 ft 11 1/2 in	182 cm	(Note: Nixon's height was recorded as 5 ft 10 1/2 in (179 cm) in an October 1943 physical examination.)
21	43	George W. Bush	5 ft 11 1/2 in	182 cm	
25	22, 24	Grover Cleveland	5 ft 11 in	180 cm	
25	28	Woodrow Wilson	5 ft 11 in	180 cm	
27	34	Dwight D. Eisenhower	5 ft 10 1/2 in	179 cm	
28	14	Franklin Pierce	5 ft 10 in	178 cm	
28	17	Andrew Johnson	5 ft 10 in	178 cm	
28	26	Theodore Roosevelt	5 ft 10 in	178 cm	
28	30	Calvin Coolidge	5 ft 10 in	178 cm	
32	39	Jimmy Carter	5 ft 9 1/2 in	177 cm	
33	13	Millard Fillmore	5 ft 9 in	175 cm	
33	33	Harry S. Truman	5 ft 9 in	175 cm	(Note: Truman's height was recorded as 5 ft 8 in (173 cm) in a 1917 physical examination.)
35	19	Rutherford B. Hayes	5 ft 8 1/2 in	174 cm	
36	9	William Henry Harrison	5 ft 8 in	173 cm	
36	11	James K. Polk	5 ft 8 in	173 cm	
36	12	Zachary Taylor	5 ft 8 in	173 cm	
36	18	Ulysses S. Grant	5 ft 8 in	173 cm	
40	6	John Quincy Adams	5 ft 7 1/2 in	171 cm	
41	2	John Adams	5 ft 7 in	170 cm	
41	25	William McKinley	5 ft 7 in	170 cm	
43	8	Martin Van Buren	5 ft 6 in	168 cm	
43	23	Benjamin Harrison	5 ft 6 in	168 cm	
45	4	James Madison	5 ft 4 in	163 cm	

== Comparative table of heights of United States presidential candidates ==
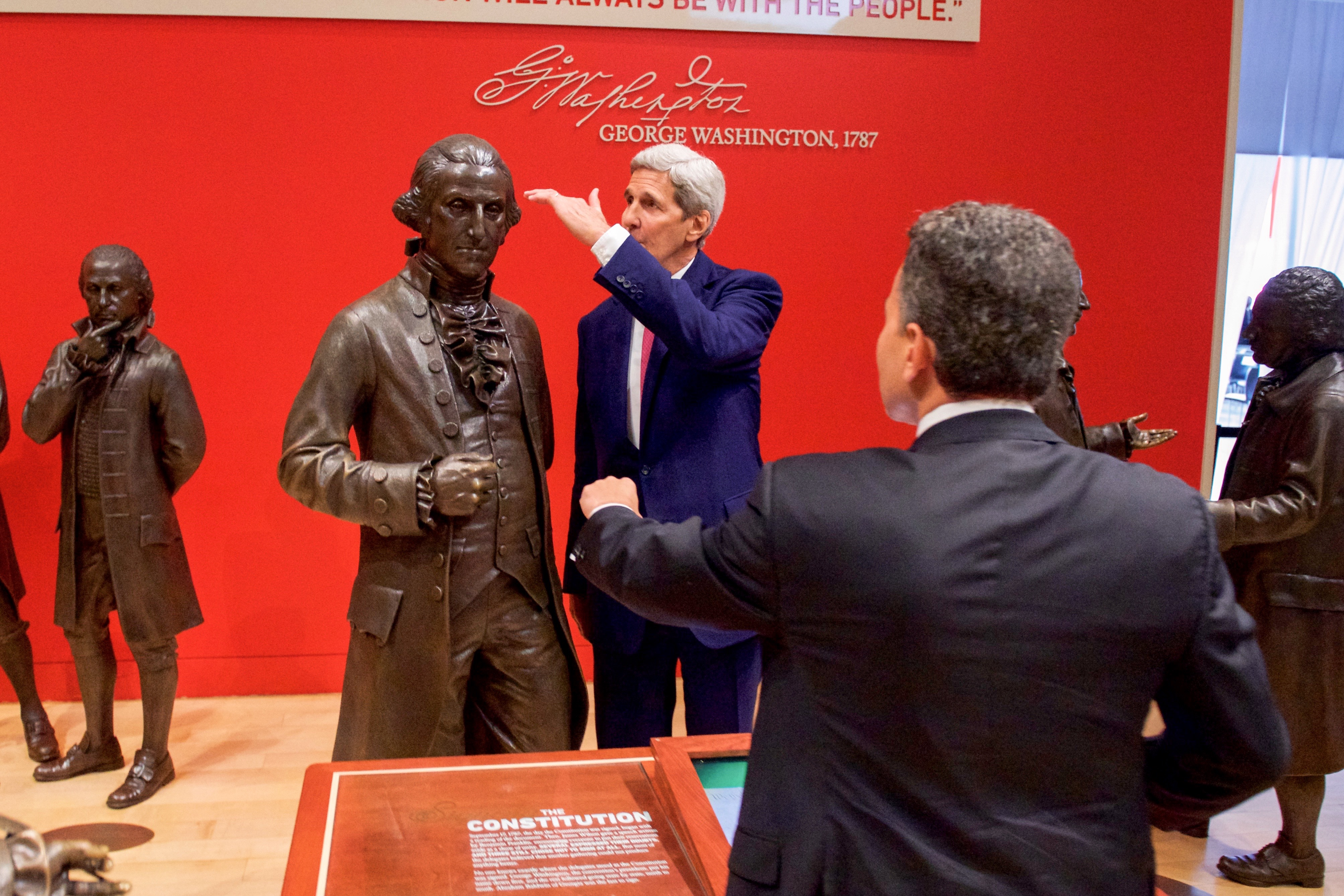
Secretary of State John Kerry compares his height to that of a statue of George Washington while touring the National Constitution Center in Philadelphia, 2015

Taller candidate was elected	Shorter candidate was elected
Winner and opponent were of the same height	Comparison data unavailable

Election	Winner in Electoral College	Height		Main opponent(s) during election	Height		Difference	
2024	Donald Trump	6 ft 3 in	191 cm	Kamala Harris	5 ft 4 1/2 in	164 cm	10 1/2 in	27 cm
2020	Joe Biden	6 ft 0 in	183 cm	Donald Trump	6 ft 3 in	191 cm	3 in	8 cm
2016	Donald Trump	6 ft 3 in	191 cm	Hillary Clinton	5 ft 5 in	165 cm	10 in	25 cm
2012	Barack Obama	6 ft 1 1/2 in	187 cm	Mitt Romney	6 ft 1 1/2 in	187 cm	0 in	0 cm
2008	Barack Obama	6 ft 1 1/2 in	187 cm	John McCain	5 ft 9 in	175 cm	4 1/2 in	11 cm
2004	George W. Bush	5 ft 11 1/2 in	182 cm	John Kerry	6 ft 4 in	193 cm	4 1/2 in	11 cm
2000	George W. Bush	5 ft 11 1/2 in	182 cm	Al Gore	6 ft 1 in	185 cm	1 1/2 in	4 cm
1996	Bill Clinton	6 ft 2 in	188 cm	Bob Dole	6 ft 2 in	188 cm	0 in	0 cm
1992	Bill Clinton	6 ft 2 in	188 cm	George H. W. Bush; Ross Perot	6 ft 2 in 5 ft 5 in	188 cm 165 cm	0 in 9 in	0 cm 24 cm
1988	George H. W. Bush	6 ft 2 in	188 cm	Michael Dukakis	5 ft 8 1/2 in	174 cm	5 1/2 in	14 cm
1984	Ronald Reagan	6 ft 1 in	185 cm	Walter Mondale	5 ft 11 in	180 cm	2 in	5 cm
1980	Ronald Reagan	6 ft 1 in	185 cm	Jimmy Carter	5 ft 9 1/2 in	177 cm	3 1/2 in	9 cm
1976	Jimmy Carter	5 ft 9 1/2 in	177 cm	Gerald Ford	6 ft 0 in	183 cm	2 1/2 in	6 cm
1972	Richard Nixon	5 ft 11 1/2 in	182 cm	George McGovern	6 ft 1 in	185 cm	1 1/2 in	4 cm
1968	Richard Nixon	5 ft 11 1/2 in	182 cm	Hubert Humphrey; George Wallace	5 ft 11 in 5 ft 7 in	180 cm 170 cm	1/2 in 4 1/2 in	1 cm 12 cm
1964	Lyndon B. Johnson	6 ft 3 1/2 in	192 cm	Barry Goldwater	5 ft 11 in	180 cm	4 1/2 in	11 cm
1960	John F. Kennedy	6 ft 1 in	185 cm	Richard Nixon	5 ft 11 1/2 in	182 cm	1 1/2 in	4 cm
1956	Dwight D. Eisenhower	5 ft 10 1/2 in	179 cm	Adlai Stevenson II	5 ft 10 in	178 cm	1/2 in	1 cm
1952	Dwight D. Eisenhower	5 ft 10 1/2 in	179 cm	Adlai Stevenson II	5 ft 10 in	178 cm	1/2 in	1 cm
1948	Harry S. Truman	5 ft 9 in	175 cm	Thomas Dewey	5 ft 8 in	173 cm	1 in	3 cm
1944	Franklin D. Roosevelt	6 ft 2 in	188 cm	Thomas Dewey	5 ft 8 in	173 cm	6 in	15 cm
1940	Franklin D. Roosevelt	6 ft 2 in	188 cm	Wendell Willkie	6 ft 2 1/2 in	189 cm	1/2 in	1 cm
1936	Franklin D. Roosevelt	6 ft 2 in	188 cm	Alfred Landon	5 ft 11 in	180 cm	3 in	8 cm
1932	Franklin D. Roosevelt	6 ft 2 in	188 cm	Herbert Hoover	5 ft 11 1/2 in	182 cm	2 1/2 in	6 cm
1928	Herbert Hoover	5 ft 11 1/2 in	182 cm	Al Smith	5 ft 11 in	180 cm	1/2 in	1 cm
1924	Calvin Coolidge	5 ft 10 in	178 cm	John W. Davis; Robert M. La Follette	5 ft 10 1/2 in 5 ft 5 in	180 cm 165 cm	1/2 in 5 in	1 cm 13 cm
1920	Warren G. Harding	6 ft 0 in	183 cm	James M. Cox	5 ft 6 in	168 cm	6 in	15 cm
1916	Woodrow Wilson	5 ft 11 in	180 cm	Charles Evans Hughes	5 ft 10 in	178 cm	1 in	3 cm
1912	Woodrow Wilson	5 ft 11 in	180 cm	William Howard Taft; Theodore Roosevelt	5 ft 11 1/2 in 5 ft 10 in	182 cm 178 cm	1/2 in 1 in	1 cm 3 cm
1908	William Howard Taft	5 ft 11 1/2 in	182 cm	William Jennings Bryan	5 ft 11 in	180 cm	1/2 in	1 cm
1904	Theodore Roosevelt	5 ft 10 in	178 cm	Alton B. Parker	5 ft 9 in	175 cm	1 in	3 cm
1900	William McKinley	5 ft 7 in	170 cm	William Jennings Bryan	5 ft 11 in	180 cm	4 in	10 cm
1896	William McKinley	5 ft 7 in	170 cm	William Jennings Bryan	5 ft 11 in	180 cm	4 in	10 cm
1892	Grover Cleveland	5 ft 11 in	180 cm	Benjamin Harrison	5 ft 6 in	168 cm	5 in	13 cm
1888	Benjamin Harrison	5 ft 6 in	168 cm	Grover Cleveland	5 ft 11 in	180 cm	5 in	13 cm
1884	Grover Cleveland	5 ft 11 in	180 cm	James G. Blaine	5 ft 11 in	180 cm	0 in	0 cm
1880	James A. Garfield	6 ft 0 in	183 cm	Winfield Hancock	6 ft 1 1/2 in	187 cm	1 1/2 in	4 cm
1876	Rutherford B. Hayes	5 ft 8 1/2 in	174 cm	Samuel Tilden	5 ft 10 in	178 cm	1 1/2 in	4 cm
1872	Ulysses S. Grant	5 ft 8 in	173 cm	Horace Greeley	5 ft 10 in	178 cm	2 in	5 cm
1868	Ulysses S. Grant	5 ft 8 in	173 cm	Horatio Seymour (Note: One account describes Seymour as "above medium height".)				
1864	Abraham Lincoln	6 ft 4 in	193 cm	George B. McClellan	5 ft 8 in	173 cm	8 in	20 cm
1860	Abraham Lincoln	6 ft 4 in	193 cm	Stephen A. Douglas; John C. Breckinridge	5 ft 4 in 6 ft 2 in	163 cm 188 cm	12 in 2 in	30 cm 5 cm
1856	James Buchanan	6 ft 0 in	183 cm	Millard Fillmore; John C. Frémont	5 ft 9 in 5 ft 9 in	175 cm 175 cm	3 in 3 in	8 cm 8 cm
1852	Franklin Pierce	5 ft 10 in	178 cm	Winfield Scott	6 ft 5 in	196 cm	7 in	18 cm
1848	Zachary Taylor	5 ft 8 in	173 cm	Lewis Cass	5 ft 8 1/2 in	174 cm	1/2 in	1 cm
1844	James K. Polk	5 ft 8 in	173 cm	Henry Clay	6 ft 1 in	185 cm	5 in	13 cm
1840	William Henry Harrison	5 ft 8 in	173 cm	Martin Van Buren	5 ft 6 in	168 cm	2 in	5 cm
1836	Martin Van Buren	5 ft 6 in	168 cm	Hugh Lawson White; William Henry Harrison	5 ft 11 in 5 ft 8 in	180 cm 173 cm	5 in 2 in	13 cm 5 cm
1832	Andrew Jackson	6 ft 1 in	185 cm	Henry Clay	6 ft 1 in	185 cm	0 in	0 cm
1828	Andrew Jackson	6 ft 1 in	185 cm	John Quincy Adams	5 ft 7 1/2 in	171 cm	5 1/2 in	14 cm
1824	John Quincy Adams	5 ft 7 1/2 in	171 cm	William H. Crawford; Andrew Jackson**; Henry Clay	6 ft 3 in 6 ft 1 in 6 ft 1 in	191 cm 185 cm 185 cm	7 1/2 in 5 1/2 in 5 1/2 in	19 cm 14 cm 14 cm
1820	James Monroe†	6 ft 0 in	183 cm					
1816	James Monroe	6 ft 0 in	183 cm	Rufus King				
1812	James Madison	5 ft 4 in	163 cm	DeWitt Clinton	6 ft 3 in	191 cm	11 in	28 cm
1808	James Madison	5 ft 4 in	163 cm	Charles C. Pinckney	5 ft 9 in	175 cm	5 in	13 cm
1804	Thomas Jefferson	6 ft 2 1/2 in	189 cm	Charles C. Pinckney	5 ft 9 in	175 cm	5 1/2 in	14 cm
1800	Thomas Jefferson	6 ft 2 1/2 in	189 cm	John Adams	5 ft 7 in	170 cm	7 1/2 in	19 cm
1796	John Adams	5 ft 7 in	170 cm	Thomas Jefferson	6 ft 2 1/2 in	189 cm	7 1/2 in	19 cm
1792	George Washington†	6 ft 1 1/2 in	187 cm					
1788–89	George Washington†	6 ft 1 1/2 in	187 cm					

Notes:

** Lost the House of Representatives vote, but received the most popular votes and a plurality of electoral votes; however, not the majority needed to win.

† Ran unopposed

== Extremes ==
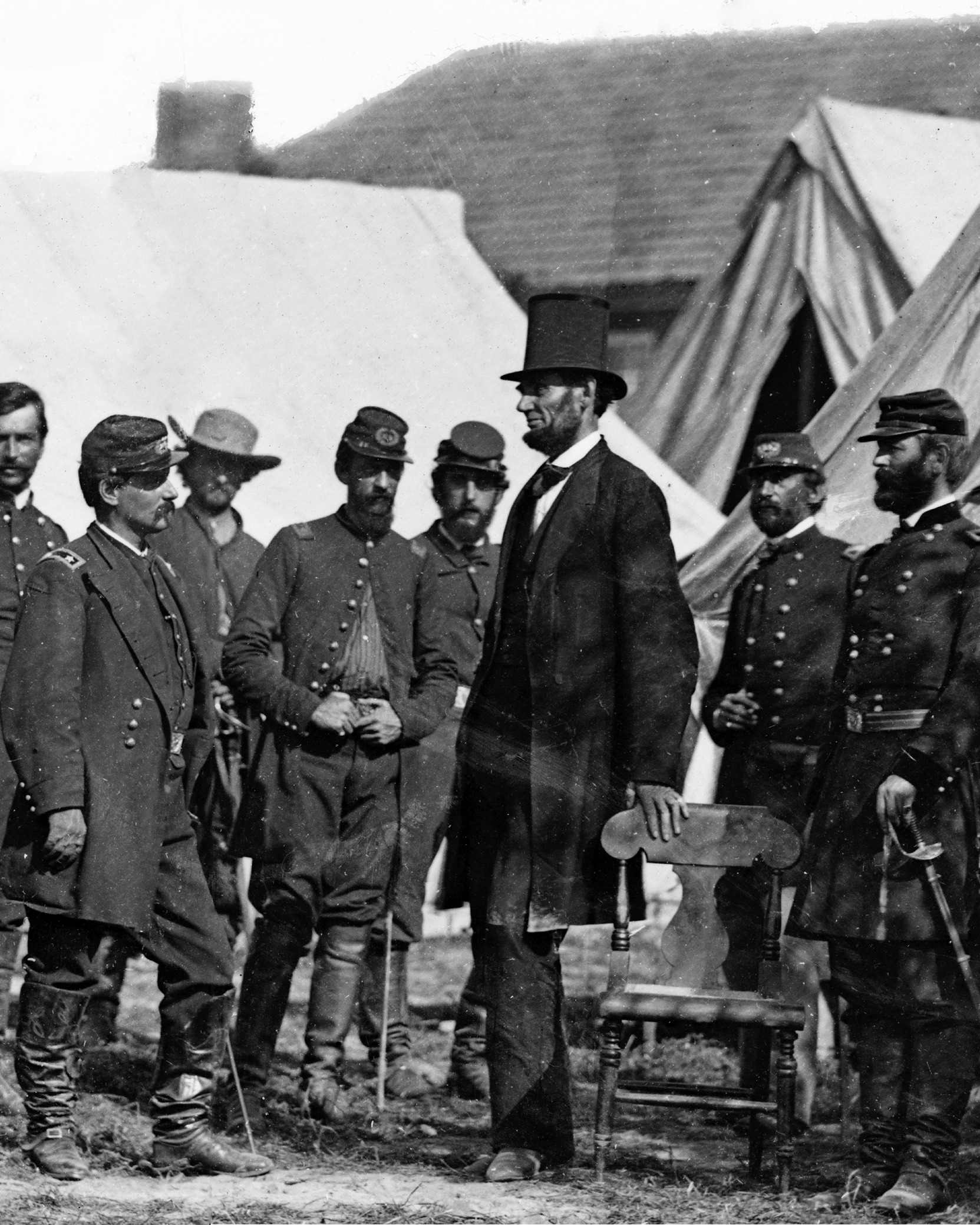
President Lincoln at Antietam in October 1862 with eventual 1864 opponent Gen. George B. McClellan (second from left)

The tallest president elected to office was Abraham Lincoln (6 ft 3 3/4 in or 192.4 cm). Portrait artist Francis Bicknell Carpenter supplies the information for Lincoln:

Mr. Lincoln's height was six feet three and three-quarter inches "in his stocking-feet." He stood up one day, at the right of my large canvas, while I marked his exact height upon it.

A disputed theory holds that Lincoln's height is the result of the genetic condition multiple endocrine neoplasia type 2b (MEN2B); see medical and mental health of Abraham Lincoln.

Only slightly shorter than Lincoln was Lyndon B. Johnson (6 ft 3 1/2 in or 192 cm), the tallest president who originally entered office without being elected directly.

The shortest president elected to office was James Madison (5 ft 4 in or 163 cm); the shortest president to originally enter the office by means other than election is tied between Millard Fillmore and Harry S. Truman (both were 5 ft 9 in or 175 cm).

The tallest unsuccessful presidential candidate (who is also the tallest of all presidential candidates) is Winfield Scott, who stood at 6 ft 5 in (196 cm) and lost the 1852 election to Franklin Pierce, who stood at 5 ft 10 in (178 cm). The second-tallest unsuccessful candidate is John Kerry at 6 ft 4 in (193 cm). The shortest unsuccessful presidential candidate is Stephen A. Douglas at 5 ft 4 in (163 cm). The second-shortest unsuccessful presidential candidate is Kamala Harris, who lost the 2024 election, and is 5 ft 4 1/2 in (164 cm).

The largest height difference between two presidential candidates (out of the candidates whose heights are known) was in the 1860 election, when Abraham Lincoln stood 12 inches (30 cm) taller than opponent Stephen A. Douglas. The second-largest difference (and the largest difference where the winner was the shorter candidate) was in the 1812 election, with DeWitt Clinton standing 11 inches (28 cm) taller than incumbent James Madison. The 2024 election between Donald Trump and Kamala Harris had the third-largest difference at 10 1/2 inches (27 cm).
