= The Visionary =

1989 painting by Ralph Wolfe Cowan

- The Entrepreneur
- Original 1989 iteration, with unpainted left hand
- Artist: Ralph Wolfe Cowan
- Year: 1989

The Visionary (or The Entrepreneur) is a 1989 painting of then-businessman Donald Trump by Ralph Wolfe Cowan. It hangs in Trump's residence of Mar-a-Lago.

== Background ==
Cowan was not commissioned by Trump to paint the portrait, but after showing Trump a sketch in oils that he had made of him, he gained his approval. Cowan prepared sketches of Trump over several weekends that he was in residence at Mar-a-Lago. The painting was completed shortly after Trump had acquired the property. Cowan had previously visited Mar-a-Lago during its years under the ownership of Marjorie Merriweather Post.

== Description ==
The painting has been described as depicting "a young, tanned and handsome Donald Trump dressed in a white tennis sweater". Cowan intentionally painted Trump in white clothes to differentiate him from his darker, more formal clothes that he wore in New York City. In a profile of Cowan for Oxford American, Nicole Pasulka wrote that Cowan's subjects are often depicted "twenty pounds thinner and twenty years younger, often surrounded by heavenly light, riding exotic animals, or framed by mountain ranges", and that Trump's portrait had a "standard Cowan sky shot".

In his 1997 profile of Trump for Playboy, Mark Bowden described Cowan's appeal to Trump as "The kind of painter he can appreciate, one who truly sees Trump the way he sees himself in the mirror". Bowden likened the portrait to a "Sun God", feeling that it portrayed a "wide-shouldered, thin-hipped Donald, his youthful face eclipsing the sun itself, his skin glowing like the top floors of Trump Tower at sunset, the color of warm bullion." Cowan describes his style as Romantic realism. Cowan has said of his work, "Nobody ever dislikes my portraits ... I know how to make them 'healthy' is the way I put it".

=== Underpainting of hand ===
External image
- The painting after Cowan repainted the hand

Trump's hand in the portrait was intentionally left unfinished at the time of its completion. It has been described as resting "imperially but incompletely on his thigh". Cowan later said that "I love the sketch portraits, where one hand is finished and the other isn't" but that Trump "didn't get" the underpainting of his hand. Cowan recalled that Trump would ask him "'When are you going to finish my painting?' ... I'd say, 'Donald, it is finished'. One day, he said to me, 'How much would you charge to fix the hand?'". Cowan eventually agreed to paint the hand for a few thousand dollars in 2002, with the agreed price of the portrait ranging from $24,000 to $18,000 according to Cowan. Cowan reduced his regular price for a portrait by 60 percent for Trump. He was granted regular access to Mar-a-Lago when it became a private members club.

Cowan has dismissed claims that he held out for a higher payment by not finishing the hand or that another artist painted the hand. Cowan later said that Trump "always tried to bargain and I don't like that at all". Cowan has commented on the size of Trump's hands, claiming that "He doesn't have little hands, like people have said ... They're perfectly proportioned".

== Aftermath ==
Cowan was subsequently commissioned by Trump's second wife, Marla, to paint a portrait of Trump's children. Cowan did not paint Trump's present wife, Melania, as Cowan claims that with the popularity of Trump's television show The Apprentice, Trump started expecting work without payment. Cowan told Trump, "Donald, I don't give away paintings".
