= Ralph Wolfe Cowan =

American portrait painter (1931–2018)

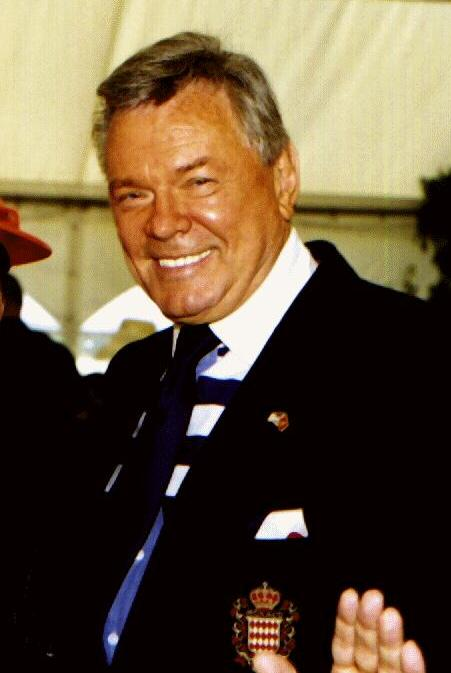
- Cowan in 1999
- Born: December 16, 1931; Phoebus, Virginia, U.S.
- Died: September 4, 2018 (aged 86); West Palm Beach, Florida, U.S.
- Known for: Portrait painting
- Spouse: Judith Page Timson (m. 1962; div. 1964)
- Website: ralphcowan.net

Ralph Wolfe Cowan (December 16, 1931 – September 4, 2018) was an American portrait artist.

== Personal life ==
Cowan was born in 1931 in Phoebus, Virginia. He was the son of Joseph Carl and Daphne (Pearce) Cowan.

Known as "RW" to his friends, he served as a paratrooper with United States Army, 1950–1953. His work spanned seven decades, from 1940's NYC until his death. A Member of the American Society Portrait Painters, American Portrait Society, Allied Artists Association, Portrait Institute.

His life and work are the subject of the 2015 feature-length documentary The Last Old Master.

Cowan died in his hometown, West Palm Beach, on September 4, 2018.

== Notable portrait paintings ==
Cowan had a longstanding relationship with the Royal Family of Monaco, and first painted Princess Grace in 1956. Subsequently, he did portraits of the Sultan of Brunei, King Fahd, King Hassan II, Shaikh Zayed of the United Arab Emirates and Mikhail Gorbachev. He has also done portraits of U.S. Presidents Reagan, Carter, Johnson, Kennedy and Trump (The Visionary), as well as Marilyn Monroe, Tony Curtis, Nancy Sinatra, Steve Wynn and most notably, Elvis Presley, for whom he remained the only commissioned artist whose portrait was allowed to hang in Graceland, the latter having been seen by some 23 million visitors since 1982. Presley's portrait was also included in the National Portrait Gallery's 2010 exhibition "One Life: Echoes of Elvis".
