= The Day of the Donald =

Book by Andrew Shaffer

- Author: Andrew Shaffer
- Cover artist: Bruce Emmett
- Language: English
- Genre: Satire
- Publisher: Crooked Lane Books
- Publication date: July 28, 2016
- Publication place: United States
- Media type: Print (Paperback)
- Pages: 270 (Paperback)
- ISBN: 978-1-68331-045-7

The Day of the Donald (subtitled Trump Trumps America!) is a satirical work of fiction by Andrew Shaffer. Published on June 28, 2016, the book imagines Donald Trump winning the US election to become the forty-fifth president (which subsequently occurred) and examines his second year in office.

== Plot ==
The book focuses on the protagonist Jimmie Bernwood, a down-on-his-luck former tabloid reporter, his attempts to ghost-write President Trump's memoir and his investigation into a murder.

Publishers Weekly states that Trump is the most harshly criticized of the multiple figures criticized in the book.

== See also ==
- Hope Never Dies
- Hope Rides Again
