= Andrew I. Schafer =

American hematologist and oncologist

Andrew I. Schafer is a preeminent American hematologist and oncologist. He is Emeritus Professor of Medicine in Hematology-Oncology and the Director of the Richard T. Silver Center for Myeloproliferative Neoplasms at Weill Cornell. He is known for his expertise in thrombosis, coagulation, platelet, and bleeding disorders. He is currently the Co-Editor of the Cecil Textbook of Medicine.

== Education ==
Schafer earned his B.A. from Northeastern University in 1969 and his M.D. from the University of Pennsylvania in 1973. He completed his residency in internal medicine at the University of Chicago and his clinical and research fellowships in hematology at Brigham and Women's Hospital and Harvard Medical School.

== Career ==
He started his academic career as a faculty member at Harvard Medical School, achieving the rank of Associate Professor of Medicine, until 1989. He then became Chief of Medicine at the Houston VA Medical Center, Professor of Medicine at Baylor College of Medicine, and Professor of Biomedical Engineering at Rice University in Houston. Schafer served as Chair of the Department of Medicine at Baylor from 1996 to 2002, after which he was recruited to the University of Pennsylvania as the Frank Wister Thomas Professor and Chair of the Department of Medicine. In 2007, he joined Weill Cornell and New York-Presbyterian Hospital, where he served as the E. Hugh Luckey Distinguished Professor of Medicine, Chair of the Department of Medicine at Weill Cornell Medical College, and Physician-in-Chief of the NewYork-Presbyterian Hospital/Weill-Cornell Medical Center until 2013.

Schafer has been a distinguished clinical and basic laboratory research investigator in the areas of blood platelet and vascular biology in health and disease, and myeloproliferative neoplasms. He is the author of approximately 240 peer-reviewed journal articles and was principal investigator of NIH grants for 30 consecutive years. He has been credited with pioneering the areas of platelet and vascular cell biology under ex vivo and in vitro condition, later extending these studies to physiological and pathophysiological conditions under shear stress and other theological forces. He and his colleagues further extended this research to in vivo studies simulating human conditions in health and disease. Schafer and his colleagues were among the first to discover specific functional abnormalities in platelet function that are associated with the bleeding and thrombotic complications in patients with myeloproliferative neoplasms.

Throughout his career, Schafer was also a continuously practicing, leading clinician in the areas of thrombosis, hemostasis, and myeloproliferative neoplasms. He has been the recipient of many teaching awards over his career.

Schafer has been on the editorial boards of several major medical and scientific journals and was the founding editor-in-chief of The Hematologist until 2014.

== Honors and awards ==
Schafer has served as the President of the American Society of Hematology in 2007 and the Association of Professors of Medicine in 2010, and the American Clinical and Climatological Association. He was elected to membership in the American Society for Clinical Investigation in 1986, the Association of American Physicians, and the Fellowship in the American Association for the Advancement of Science. He is also a Master of the American College of Physicians, a member of the New York Academy of Medicine, and the Institute of Medicine (IOM) of the National Academies in 2012.

Schafer received Robert H. Williams, MD Distinguish Leadership Award from the Association of Professors of Medicine in 2012.

== Selected books ==
- Thrombosis and hemorrhage (3rd ed.). Philadelphia: Lippincott Williams & Wilkins. 2003. ISBN 978-0781730662.
- The vanishing physician-scientist?. Ithaca: ILR Press. 2009. ISBN 978-0801448454.
- Goldman's Cecil medicine (24th ed.). Philadelphia: Elsevier/Saunders. 2011. ISBN 978-1437716047.
- Goldman-Cecil Medicine E-Book (Cecil Textbook of Medicine) 26th Edition (2019)
