= Mr. President! =

2016 video game

Mr.President!
- Developer: Game Developer X
- Publisher: Game Developer X
- Platform: Windows
- Release: October 11, 2016
- Genre: Parody
- Mode: Single-player

Mr. President! is a 2016 video game developed and published by Game Developer X. The game tasks the player with saving a fictitious presidential candidate from being assassinated. It was released on October 11, 2016, on Windows. The game went viral among YouTubers, and saw a resurgence in 2024 after the attempted assassination of Donald Trump in Pennsylvania.

== Gameplay ==
The game is divided into several levels, with varied environments that include breakable objects and ragdoll physics. In each level, the central objective remains: saving Rump from an assassination attempt.

A primary way to defend Rump is to act as a human shield, by diving in front of a red laser sight and using the bodyguard's bullet-proof body to block the bullet. However, sometimes the player will have to knock down Rump himself in order to save him. Slow motion can be used for an unlimited amount of time by holding down the right mouse button. If the candidate dies, the level needs to be started over.

== Plot ==
The player controls the "bulletproof man" Dick "Rock-Hard" Johnson, a United States Secret Service agent and "the best bodyguard money can buy". He is tasked with protecting the United States presidential election candidate Ronald Rump, a parody of Donald Trump.

Over the course of the game, over 50 assassination attempts against Rump take place. The perpetrators are described as "socialist money stealers" and the "liberal media".

== Release ==
Mr. President! was released on October 11, 2016, shortly before the 2016 United States presidential election. A portion of the game's revenue is believed to go towards charity.

== Reception ==
Mr. President! was described by Kotaku as "a game for people who are irreverent, hate Donald Trump or feel strongly about ragdoll physics". Gamereactor UK rated it the fourth-best game featuring Trump. PC Gamer criticized the gameplay, stating that "levels quickly devolve into frustrating obstacle courses" and that "the buggy, unpredictable physics becomes a barrier to the joke". As of July 2024, the game had 82% positive user reviews on Steam.

=== Popularity ===
Upon its release, Mr. President! was covered by various popular YouTubers, such as Markiplier. The game experienced a resurgence in popularity in 2024 after an attempted assassination of Donald Trump in Pennsylvania.
