= Andrew Shaffer =

American author

Andrew Shaffer (born in Cedar Rapids, Iowa, United States.) is an American author. Under the pen name "Fanny Merkin," he authored the Fifty Shades of Grey parody Fifty Shames of Earl Grey. His other books include Great Philosophers Who Failed at Love, and Literary Rogues: A Scandalous History of Wayward Authors. He also wrote a string of political fiction novels involving United States Presidents, including Hope Never Dies, Hope Rides Again, and Day of the Donald. He is the founder and creative director of Order of St. Nick, a greeting card company. He resides in Louisville, Kentucky with his wife, novelist Tiffany Reisz.

== Background and career ==
Shaffer attended the Iowa Writers' Workshop for a summer semester and studied comedy writing at Chicago's The Second City. He reviews books for RT Book Reviews, a magazine devoted largely to romance and erotic literature. He is also a columnist for the Huffington Post where he covers news within the publishing industry and reviews new book releases.

== Order of St. Nick ==
Shaffer started the greeting card company Order of St. Nick after trying to find seasonal cards that expressed secular beliefs to send to atheists during the holidays. CBS's The Early Show featured Order of St. Nick's Depressing Times cards as one of the most prominent examples of the 'Great Depression chic' trend in 2009.

== Fifty Shames of Earl Grey ==
Shaffer wrote Fifty Shames of Earl Grey under the pen name "Fanny Merkin." Fifty Shames of Earl Grey is a parody of E. L. James' popular trilogy, Fifty Shades of Grey. Publishers Weekly suggested "The parody brings to life all of the arguments for and against 50 Shades, including the feminist concerns, portrayal of BDSM, roots in Twilight fan-fiction, and EL James's writing style."

== How to Survive a Sharknado and Other Unnatural Disasters ==
In 2015, Shaffer's tie-in book to the Syfy channel's Sharknado series of films debuted on the New York Times Bestseller List.

== Ghosts from Our Past: Both Literally and Figuratively: The Study of the Paranormal ==
Released on June 28, 2016, this Ghosts from Our Past is a tie-in book to Ghostbusters (2016). Shaffer is listed as a co-author; the other two listed authors, Erin Gilbert and Abby L. Yates, are fictional characters in the Ghostbusters film.

== Bibliography ==
- Great Philosophers who failed at love, Harper Perennial, New York, 2011.
- Fifty Shames of Earl Grey: A Parody, Da Capo Press, Massachusetts, 2012.
- Literary Rogues: A Scandalous History of Wayward Authors, Harper Perennial, New York, 2013.
- How to Survive a Sharknado and Other Unnatural Disasters, Three Rivers Press, New York, 2015.
- Ghosts from Our Past: Both Literally and Figuratively: The Study of the Paranormal, Three Rivers Press, New York, 2016.
- The Day of the Donald, Crooked Lane Books, New York, 2016.
- Hope Never Dies: An Obama Biden Mystery (Obama Biden Mysteries), Thorndike Press Large Print, 2018 / Quirk Books, 2018, ISBN 978-1-68369-039-9
- Hope Rides Again: An Obama Biden Mystery (Obama Biden Mysteries), Quirk Books, 2019, ISBN 978-1-68369-122-8
- ”Secret Santa”, Quirk Books, 2020, ISBN 1683692055
- Feel the Bern: A Bernie Sanders Mystery (Bernie Sanders Mysteries), Ten Speed Press/Crown Publishing, 2022, ISBN 9781984861146
