= Duisburg I =

Federal electoral district of Germany

114 Duisburg I
- Electoral district for the Bundestag
- Duisburg I in 2025
- State: North Rhine-Westphalia
- Population: 245,600 (2019)
- Electorate: 163,394 (2021)
- Major settlements: Duisburg (partial)
- Area: 119.1 km^{2}

Current electoral district
- Created: 1949
- Party: SPD
- Member: Bärbel Bas
- Elected: 2009, 2013, 2017, 2021, 2025

Duisburg I is an electoral constituency (German: Wahlkreis) represented in the Bundestag. It elects one member via first-past-the-post voting. Under the current constituency numbering system, it is designated as constituency 114. It is located in the Ruhr region of North Rhine-Westphalia, comprising the southern part of the city of Duisburg.

Duisburg I was created for the inaugural 1949 federal election. Since 2009, it has been represented by Bärbel Bas of the Social Democratic Party (SPD).

== Geography ==
Duisburg I is located in the Ruhr region of North Rhine-Westphalia. As of the 2021 federal election, it comprises the southern part of the independent city of Duisburg, specifically the Stadtbezirke of Rheinhausen and Süd, as well as Mitte excluding the Stadtteil of Duissern.

== History ==
Duisburg I was created in 1949. In the 1949 election, it was North Rhine-Westphalia constituency 33 in the numbering system. From 1953 through 1961, it was number 92. From 1965 through 1976, it was number 90. From 1980 through 1998, it was number 84. From 2002 through 2009, it was number 116. In the 2013 through 2021 elections, it was number 115. From the 2025 election, it has been number 114.

Originally, the constituency comprised the area of Duisburg north of the Ruhr except for the Stadtteile of Laar and Ruhrort. From 1965 through 1976, it comprised the area of Duisburg north of the Ruhr. From 1980 through 2009, it comprised the Stadtbezirke of Mitte, Rheinhausen, and Süd. In the 2013 election, it lost the Stadtteil of Duissern.

Election	No.	Name	Borders
1949	33	Duisburg I	Duisburg city (only the area north of the Ruhr except for the Stadtteile of Laar and Ruhrort)
1953	92	Duisburg I	Duisburg city (only the area north of the Ruhr except for the Stadtteile of Laar and Ruhrort)
1957	92	Duisburg I	Duisburg city (only the area north of the Ruhr except for the Stadtteile of Laar and Ruhrort)
1961	92	Duisburg I	Duisburg city (only the area north of the Ruhr except for the Stadtteile of Laar and Ruhrort)
1965	90	Duisburg I	Duisburg city (only the area north of the Ruhr)
1969	90	Duisburg I	Duisburg city (only the area north of the Ruhr)
1972	90	Duisburg I	Duisburg city (only the area north of the Ruhr)
1976	90	Duisburg I	Duisburg city (only the area north of the Ruhr)
1980	84	Duisburg I	Duisburg city (only Mitte, Rheinhausen, and Süd Stadtbezirke)
1983	84	Duisburg I	Duisburg city (only Mitte, Rheinhausen, and Süd Stadtbezirke)
1987	84	Duisburg I	Duisburg city (only Mitte, Rheinhausen, and Süd Stadtbezirke)
1990	84	Duisburg I	Duisburg city (only Mitte, Rheinhausen, and Süd Stadtbezirke)
1994	84	Duisburg I	Duisburg city (only Mitte, Rheinhausen, and Süd Stadtbezirke)
1998	84	Duisburg I	Duisburg city (only Mitte, Rheinhausen, and Süd Stadtbezirke)
2002	116	Duisburg I	Duisburg city (only Mitte, Rheinhausen, and Süd Stadtbezirke)
2005	116	Duisburg I	Duisburg city (only Mitte, Rheinhausen, and Süd Stadtbezirke)
2009	116	Duisburg I	Duisburg city (only Mitte, Rheinhausen, and Süd Stadtbezirke)
2013	115	Duisburg I	Duisburg city (only Mitte (excluding Duissern Stadtteil), Rheinhausen, and Süd Stadtbezirke)
2017	115	Duisburg I	Duisburg city (only Mitte (excluding Duissern Stadtteil), Rheinhausen, and Süd Stadtbezirke)
2021	115	Duisburg I	Duisburg city (only Mitte (excluding Duissern Stadtteil), Rheinhausen, and Süd Stadtbezirke)
2025	114	Duisburg I	Duisburg city (only Mitte (excluding Duissern Stadtteil), Rheinhausen, and Süd Stadtbezirke)

== Members ==
The constituency has been held by the Social Democratic Party (SPD) during all but two Bundestag terms since 1949. It was first represented by Eberhard Brünen of the SPD for a single term from 1949, before Leo Storm of the Christian Democratic Union (CDU) won it in 1953. He was re-elected in 1957. Former member Brünen regained it for the SPD in 1961, and served a further three terms. Günter Schluckebier served two terms from 1972 to 1980, when he was succeeded by Helmut Wieczorek, who was representative until 2002. Petra Weis held the seat from 2002 to 2009. Bärbel Bas was elected in 2009, and re-elected in 2013, 2017, 2021, and 2025.

Election	Member	Party	%
1949	Eberhard Brünen	SPD	39.6
1953	Leo Storm	CDU	44.0
1957	Leo Storm	CDU	48.8
1961	Eberhard Brünen	SPD	49.8
1965	Eberhard Brünen	SPD	56.8
1969	Eberhard Brünen	SPD	61.3
1972	Günter Schluckebier	SPD	70.0
1976	Günter Schluckebier	SPD	66.3
1980	Helmut Wieczorek	SPD	59.4
1983	Helmut Wieczorek	SPD	56.7
1987	Helmut Wieczorek	SPD	57.3
1990	Helmut Wieczorek	SPD	54.7
1994	Helmut Wieczorek	SPD	56.9
1998	Helmut Wieczorek	SPD	61.0
2002	Petra Weis	SPD	57.7
2005	Petra Weis	SPD	55.9
2009	Bärbel Bas	SPD	42.2
2013	Bärbel Bas	SPD	46.6
2017	Bärbel Bas	SPD	38.3
2021	Bärbel Bas	SPD	40.3
2025	Bärbel Bas	SPD	39.0

== Election results ==
=== 2025 election ===
Federal election (2025): Duisburg I
Notes:	Blue background denotes the winner of the electorate vote. Pink background denotes a candidate elected from their party list. Yellow background denotes an electorate win by a list member, or other incumbent. A ✓ or ✗ denotes status of any incumbent, win or lose respectively.						
Party	Candidate	Votes	%	±%	Party votes	%	±%
SPD	✓ Bärbel Bas	49,116	39.0	▼1.3	32,468	25.7	▼9.4
CDU	Dennis Schleß	27,748	22.0	▲1.3	28,994	23.0	▲3.3
AfD	Alan Imamura	22,224	17.7	▲8.2	21,867	17.3	▲9.0
Left	Mirze Edis	10,805	8.6	▲3.9	13,149	10.4	▲5.7
Greens	Lamya Kaddor	9,830	7.8	▼6.5	13,470	10.7	▼4.6
BSW					6,412	5.1	
FDP	Sven Benentreu	3,081	2.4	▼4.5	4,228	3.3	▼5.7
Tierschutzpartei					2,083	1.6	▼0.2
Volt	Britta Söntgerath	1,389	1.1		755	0.6	▲0.3
FW	Phillip Sengpiel	1,378	1.1	▼0.2	582	0.5	▼0.2
PARTEI					882	0.7	▼0.6
Team Todenhöfer					455	0.4	▼1.0
MLPD	Quo Luong	302	0.2	▼0.2	118	0.1	0.0
dieBasis				▼1.2	267	0.2	▼0.7
PdF					260	0.2	▲0.2
BD					153	0.1	
MERA25					102	0.1	
Values					63	0.0	
Pirates							▼0.4
Gesundheitsforschung							▼0.1
Humanists							▼0.1
ÖDP							▼0.1
Bündnis C							▼0.1
SGP						0.0	0.0
Informal votes		1,297			862		
Total valid votes		125,873			126,308		
Turnout		127,170	79.5	▲6.9			
SPD hold	Majority	21,368	17.0				

=== 2021 election ===
Federal election (2021): Duisburg I
Notes:	Blue background denotes the winner of the electorate vote. Pink background denotes a candidate elected from their party list. Yellow background denotes an electorate win by a list member, or other incumbent. A ✓ or ✗ denotes status of any incumbent, win or lose respectively.						
Party	Candidate	Votes	%	±%	Party votes	%	±%
SPD	✓ Bärbel Bas	47,314	40.3	▲2.1	41,308	35.1	▲3.4
CDU	Thomas Mahlberg	24,299	20.7	▼8.0	23,166	19.7	▼6.0
Greens	Lamya Kaddor	16,777	14.3	▲8.7	17,912	15.2	▲8.7
AfD	Sascha Lensing	11,101	9.5	▼2.0	9,802	8.3	▼3.0
FDP	Charline Kappes	8,203	7.0	0.0	10,593	9.0	▼1.4
Left	Mirze Edis	5,500	4.7	▼2.2	5,580	4.7	▼3.9
Tierschutzpartei					2,135	1.8	▲0.9
Team Todenhöfer					1,603	1.4	
PARTEI					1,482	1.3	▲0.1
FW	Jan Richter	1,470	1.3		780	0.7	▲0.4
dieBasis	Felix Engelke	1,395	1.2		1,081	0.9	
Pirates					487	0.4	▼0.2
Volt					308	0.3	
LIEBE					158	0.1	
Gesundheitsforschung					156	0.1	0.0
NPD					149	0.1	▼0.2
MLPD	Günther Bittel	489	0.4	0.0	148	0.1	▼0.1
LfK					142	0.1	
Independent	Fatma Ergin	411	0.4				
Independent	Boris Opfer	321	0.3				
Humanists					128	0.1	0.0
V-Partei3					112	0.1	0.0
ÖDP					79	0.1	0.0
du.					79	0.1	
Bündnis C					75	0.1	
DKP					46	0.0	0.0
PdF					35	0.0	
LKR					28	0.0	
SGP					22	0.0	0.0
Informal votes		1,320			1,006		
Total valid votes		117,280			117,594		
Turnout		118,600	72.6	▲0.2			
SPD hold	Majority	23,015	19.6	▲10.1			

=== 2017 election ===
Federal election (2017): Duisburg I
Notes:	Blue background denotes the winner of the electorate vote. Pink background denotes a candidate elected from their party list. Yellow background denotes an electorate win by a list member, or other incumbent. A ✓ or ✗ denotes status of any incumbent, win or lose respectively.						
Party	Candidate	Votes	%	±%	Party votes	%	±%
SPD	✓ Bärbel Bas	45,455	38.3	▼8.3	37,925	31.7	▼7.5
CDU	Thomas Mahlberg	34,053	28.7	▼3.5	30,746	25.7	▼4.3
AfD	Guido Krebber	13,648	11.5		13,549	11.3	▲6.2
FDP	Carlos Gebauer	8,289	7.0	▲5.3	12,491	10.4	▲7.1
Left	Özden Ateş	8,146	6.9	▲0.5	10,369	8.7	▲0.8
Greens	Anna von Spiczak‐Brzezinski	6,648	5.6	▲0.5	7,844	6.6	▼0.4
AD-DEMOKRATEN					1,536	1.3	
PARTEI					1,353	1.1	▲0.7
Tierschutzpartei					1,110	0.9	
Pirates	Christel Hopf	2,012	1.7	▼1.6	717	0.6	▼1.8
NPD					439	0.4	▼1.9
FW					294	0.2	▲0.1
MLPD	Günther Bittel	517	0.4		209	0.2	0.0
V-Partei³					167	0.1	
DiB					140	0.1	
DM					129	0.1	
BGE					118	0.1	
Gesundheitsforschung					118	0.1	
Volksabstimmung					107	0.1	▼0.1
ÖDP					106	0.1	0.0
Die Humanisten					86	0.1	
DKP					44	0.0	
SGP					19	0.0	0.0
Informal votes		2,870			2,022		
Total valid votes		118,768			119,616		
Turnout		121,638	72.4	▲1.3			
SPD hold	Majority	11,402	9.6	▼4.8			

=== 2013 election ===
Federal election (2013): Duisburg I
Notes:	Blue background denotes the winner of the electorate vote. Pink background denotes a candidate elected from their party list. Yellow background denotes an electorate win by a list member, or other incumbent. A ✓ or ✗ denotes status of any incumbent, win or lose respectively.						
Party	Candidate	Votes	%	±%	Party votes	%	±%
SPD	✓ Bärbel Bas	55,779	46.6	▲4.1	47,165	39.2	▲2.5
CDU	Thomas Mahlberg	38,477	32.2	▲0.7	36,109	30.0	▲3.6
Left	Marc Mulia	8,802	7.4	▼3.2	9,475	7.9	▼3.7
Greens	Anna von Spiczak	6,107	5.1	▼2.5	8,341	6.9	▼2.5
AfD					6,211	5.2	
NPD	Karl Wilhelm Hubert Weise	4,608	3.9	▲2.1	2,748	2.3	▲1.0
Pirates	Rainer Kolb	3,926	3.3		2,897	2.4	▲0.6
FDP	Jörg Löbe	1,955	1.6	▼4.3	4,044	3.4	▼6.6
PRO					857	0.7	
PARTEI					517	0.4	
BIG					336	0.3	
REP					318	0.3	▼0.2
Volksabstimmung					267	0.2	▲0.1
FW					207	0.2	
MLPD					181	0.2	0.0
Nichtwahler					177	0.1	
ÖDP					156	0.1	0.0
Party of Reason					91	0.1	
RRP					76	0.1	▼0.1
Die Rechte					63	0.1	
PSG					43	0.0	0.0
BüSo					36	0.0	0.0
Informal votes		2,161			1,500		
Total valid votes		119,654			120,315		
Turnout		121,815	71.1	▲2.3			
SPD hold	Majority	17,302	14.4	▲3.8			

=== 2009 election ===
Federal election (2009): Duisburg I
Notes:	Blue background denotes the winner of the electorate vote. Pink background denotes a candidate elected from their party list. Yellow background denotes an electorate win by a list member, or other incumbent. A ✓ or ✗ denotes status of any incumbent, win or lose respectively.						
Party	Candidate	Votes	%	±%	Party votes	%	±%
SPD	Bärbel Bas	53,363	42.2	▼13.7	45,956	36.3	▼13.7
CDU	Thomas Mahlberg	40,001	31.6	▲2.5	33,638	26.6	▲2.2
Left	Marc Mulia	13,237	10.5	▲4.3	14,678	11.6	▲4.3
Greens	Reiner Neumann	9,791	7.7	▲3.6	12,118	9.6	▲1.2
FDP	Frank Albrecht	7,501	5.9	▲3.2	12,709	10.0	▲3.2
Pirates					2,305	1.8	
NPD	Roswitha Theißen	2,191	1.7	▲0.6	1,529	1.2	▲0.4
Tierschutzpartei					1,038	0.8	▲0.2
FAMILIE					662	0.5	▼0.1
REP					594	0.5	0.0
RENTNER					551	0.4	
Independent	Marcel Wojnarowicz	405	0.3				
RRP					217	0.2	
MLPD					161	0.1	0.0
Centre					131	0.1	▲0.1
Volksabstimmung					120	0.1	0.0
DVU					110	0.1	
ÖDP					107	0.1	
BüSo					36	0.0	0.0
PSG					32	0.0	0.0
Informal votes		1,837			1,634		
Total valid votes		126,489			126,692		
Turnout		128,326	69.1	▼8.4			
SPD hold	Majority	13,362	10.6	▼16.2			

=== 2005 election ===
Federal election (2005): Duisburg I
Notes:	Blue background denotes the winner of the electorate vote. Pink background denotes a candidate elected from their party list. Yellow background denotes an electorate win by a list member, or other incumbent. A ✓ or ✗ denotes status of any incumbent, win or lose respectively.						
Party	Candidate	Votes	%	±%	Party votes	%	±%
SPD	✓ Petra Weis	80,328	55.9	▼1.7	71,746	49.9	▼3.6
CDU	Thomas Mahlberg	41,821	29.1	▲1.2	35,040	24.4	▼0.6
Left	Helmut Laakmann	8,936	6.2	▲4.2	10,468	7.3	▲5.4
Greens	Heinz Kantel	5,884	4.1	▼2.3	11,955	8.3	▼1.0
FDP	Karsten Vüllings	3,951	2.7	▼2.3	96,444	6.7	▼0.4
NPD	Karl Wise	1,571	1.1		1,222	0.9	▲0.5
Familie	Fred Carpenter	1,310	0.9		874	0.6	▲0.4
Tierschutzpartei					825	0.6	▲0.1
GRAUEN					688	0.5	▲0.2
REP					645	0.4	▼0.1
MLPD					157	0.1	
From Now on... Democracy Through Referendum					135	0.1	
PBC					102	0.1	
BüSo					62	0.0	
Centre					48	0.0	
Socialist Equality Party					42	0.0	0.0
Informal votes		2,108			2,256		
Total valid votes		143,801			143,653		
Turnout		145,909	77.4	▼2.1			
SPD hold	Majority	38,507	26.8				
