= Bärbel Bas =

German politician (born 1968)

Bärbel Bas MdB
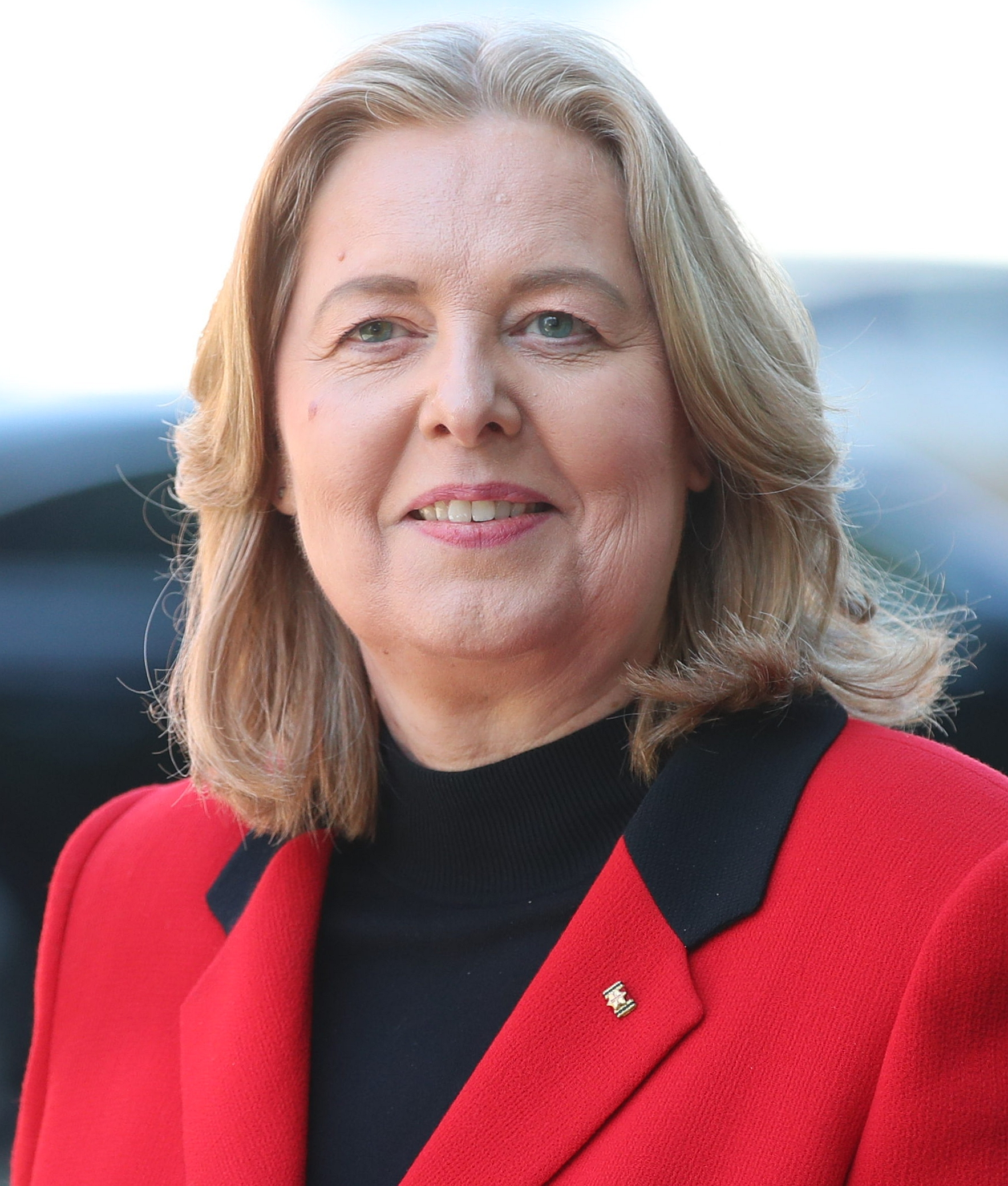
- Bas in 2025

Minister of Labour and Social Affairs
- In office 6 May 2025 – 13 October 2026
- Chancellor: Friedrich Merz
- Preceded by: Hubertus Heil
- Succeeded by: Alexander Schweitzer

Leader of the Social Democratic Party
- In office 27 June 2025 – 12 October 2026 Serving with Lars Klingbeil
- Deputy: Petra Köpping; Serpil Midyatli; Achim Post; Anke Rehlinger; Alexander Schweitzer
- General Secretary: Tim Klüssendorf
- Preceded by: Saskia Esken
- Succeeded by: TBD

President of the Bundestag
- In office 26 October 2021 – 25 March 2025
- Preceded by: Wolfgang Schäuble
- Succeeded by: Julia Klöckner

Deputy Leader of the Social Democratic Party in the Bundestag
- In office 24 September 2019 – 26 September 2021
- Leader: Rolf Mützenich
- Preceded by: Karl Lauterbach
- Succeeded by: Dagmar Schmidt

Member of the Bundestag for Duisburg I
- Incumbent
- Assumed office 27 October 2009
- Preceded by: Petra Weis

Personal details
- Born: 3 May 1968 (age 58) Duisburg, West Germany
- Party: SPD (since 1988)
- Spouse: Siegfried Ambrosius (m. 2015; died 2020)

Bärbel Bas (German: [ˈbɛʁbl̩ ˈbaːs]; born 3 May 1968) is a German politician of the Social Democratic Party (SPD) who served as Federal Minister of Labour and Social Affairs in the government of Chancellor Friedrich Merz from May 2025 to October 2026. From June 2025 to October 2026, she also served as one of two co-leaders of her party, alongside Lars Klingbeil. She announced her resignation from both positions on 12 October 2026.

Bas has been a member of the German Bundestag since the federal election in 2009. She served as the 14th president of the Bundestag from 2021 to 2025. She also served as the deputy chairwoman of the SPD parliamentary group under the leadership of chairman Rolf Mützenich from 2019 to 2021.

== Early life and career ==
Born in the Walsum district of Duisburg in 1968, Bas obtained her ten-year secondary school certificate in 1984 at the age of sixteen. From 1985 to 1987 she served an apprenticeship as an office assistant at the Duisburger Verkehrsgesellschaft (DVG), where she worked from 1987 to 2001 as a clerk, and later moved to the company's own health insurance department. From 1986 to 1988 she was a representative of youth and trainees at DVG and from 1988 to 1998 she was a member of the works council and employee representative on the supervisory board of DVG.

From 1994 to 1997, Bas completed a vocational training programme to become a social security specialist. That was followed, in 2000–2002, by in-service training as a health insurance business administrator and the instructor diploma in 2003. From 2002 to 2006 she was a deputy board member of the health insurance fund EVS. From 2005 to 2007, she completed further training as a human resources economist (VWA) at the Administrative and Business Academy Essen. Subsequently, Bas served as Head of the Department of Personnel Services at BKK Futur from 2007 to 2009.

== Political career ==
In October 1988, Bas joined the SPD. A year later she became a member of the Jusos sub-district board Duisburg, of which she was chairwoman from 1990 to 1998. Since then she has been a member of the subdistrict board of the Duisburg SPD. She served as deputy chairwoman since 2006. Since 2004, she has been a member of the Regional Council Niederrhein, since 2009 a member of the RuhrSPD and since 2010 chairwoman of the SPD state party council in North Rhine-Westphalia.

From 1994 to 2002 Bärbel Bas was a member of the City Council of Duisburg.

=== Member of Parliament, 2009–present ===
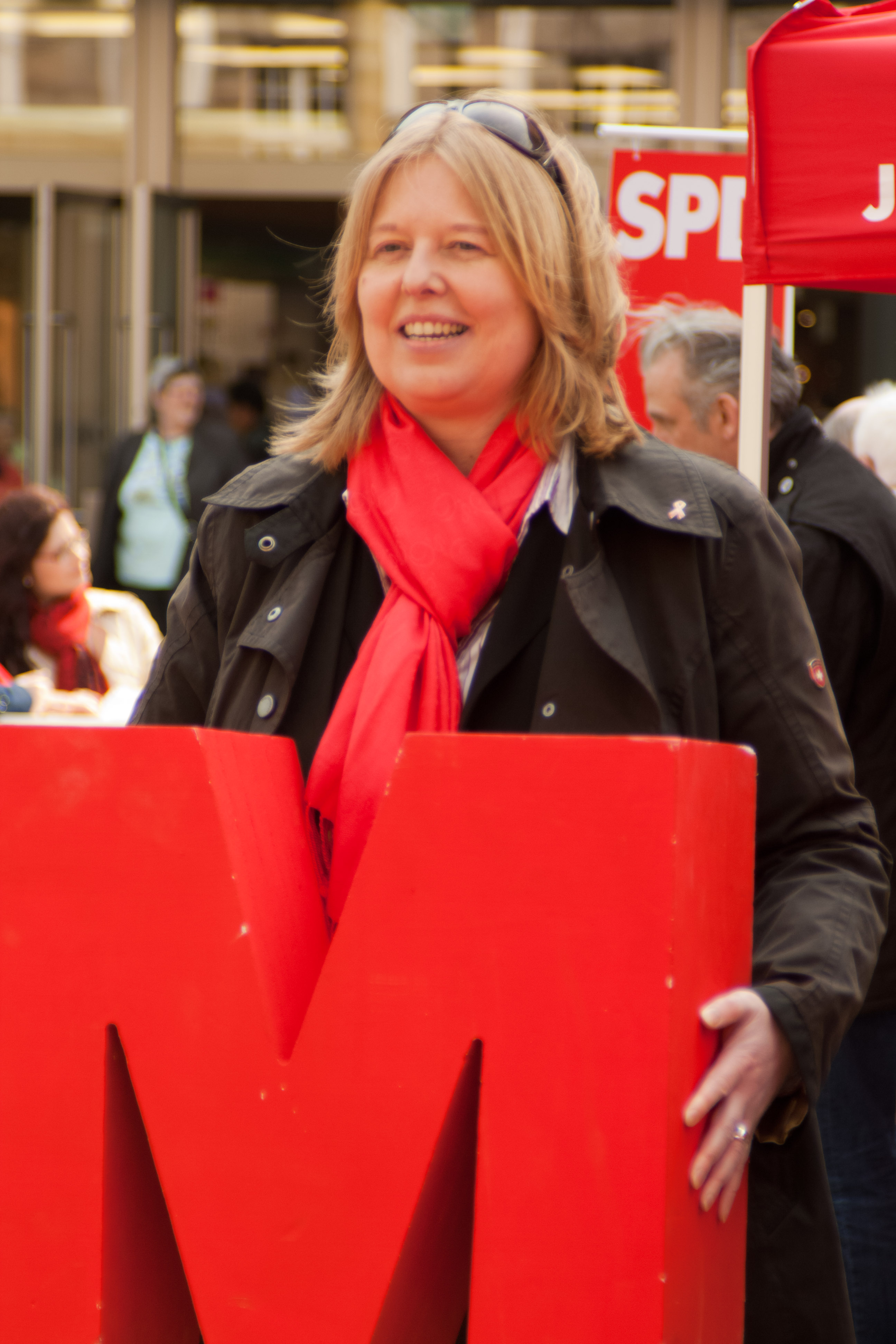
Bas in 2010

In the 2009 federal election, Bas was elected in the constituency of Duisburg I for the SPD as an MP in the 17th German Bundestag. She was able to defend her direct mandate in the 2013 federal election, the 2017 federal election, the 2021 federal election, and the 2025 federal election. In the 17th Bundestag she was a full member of the Committee on Health, to which she continued to be a deputy member since in the 18th Bundestag. From 2014, she was a member of the parliament's Council of Elders, which – among other duties – determines daily legislative agenda items and assigns committee chairpersons based on party representation. She was also a deputy member of the Gemeinsamer Ausschuss (Joint Committee) of the Bundesrat and Bundestag.

Within her parliamentary group, Bas belongs to the left party wing of the SPD, the Parliamentary Left (Parlamentarische Linke). From December 2013 until 2017, she served as Parliamentary Director (Parlamentarischer Geschäftsführer, Chief whip) of the SPD parliamentary group. Bas later served as the group's deputy chairwoman under the leadership of chairman Rolf Mützenich from 2019 until 2021.

In addition to her committee assignments, Bas is a member of the Parliamentary Friendship Group for Relations with the States of Central America.

=== President of the Bundestag, 2021–2025 ===
On 26 October 2021, Bas was elected as the 14th President of the Bundestag for the 20th Bundestag, with 576 votes for, 90 against, and 58 abstentions. Bas was the third female Bundestag president, after Annemarie Renger (SPD) and Rita Süssmuth (CDU).

=== Minister of Labour and Social Affairs, 2025–2026 ===
In the government of Chancellor Friedrich Merz Bas served as Federal Minister of Labour and Social Affairs from May 2025.

In June 2025, Bas was elected as one of two co-leaders alongside Lars Klingbeil of her party, SPD.

On 12 October 2026, Bas resigned as SPD co-leader, as well as Federal Minister of Labour and Social Affairs, citing the recent death of her stepdaughter, as well as increasing "public attacks", including from the CDU. In response, SPD co-leader Lars Klingbeil called the attacks against Bas during her mourning period unacceptable, while Chancellor Freidrich Merz said that he respected her decision and thanked her for her "trustworthy cooperation". She was succeeded in her ministerial post by Alexander Schweitzer, current head of the SPD's parliamentary ‌group in the state of Rhineland-Palatinate and the state's former state premier.

== Other activities ==
=== Corporate boards ===
- Hüttenwerke Krupp Mannesmann, Member of the Supervisory Board (2015–2025)
- Gesellschaft für Wirtschaftsförderung Duisburg mbH, Member of the Supervisory Board (until 2013)
- Stadtwerke Duisburg AG, Member of the Supervisory Board (until 2013)

=== Non-profit organizations ===
- Humanitarian Aid Foundation for Persons infected with HIV through Blood Products (HIV Foundation), Member of the Board
- German United Services Trade Union (ver.di), Member
- MSV Duisburg, Member

== Recognition ==
- Grand Cross 1st class of the Order of Merit of the Federal Republic of Germany

=== Foreign honors ===
- Spain:
  - Grand Cross of the Order of Isabella the Catholic (11 October 2022)
- Ukraine:
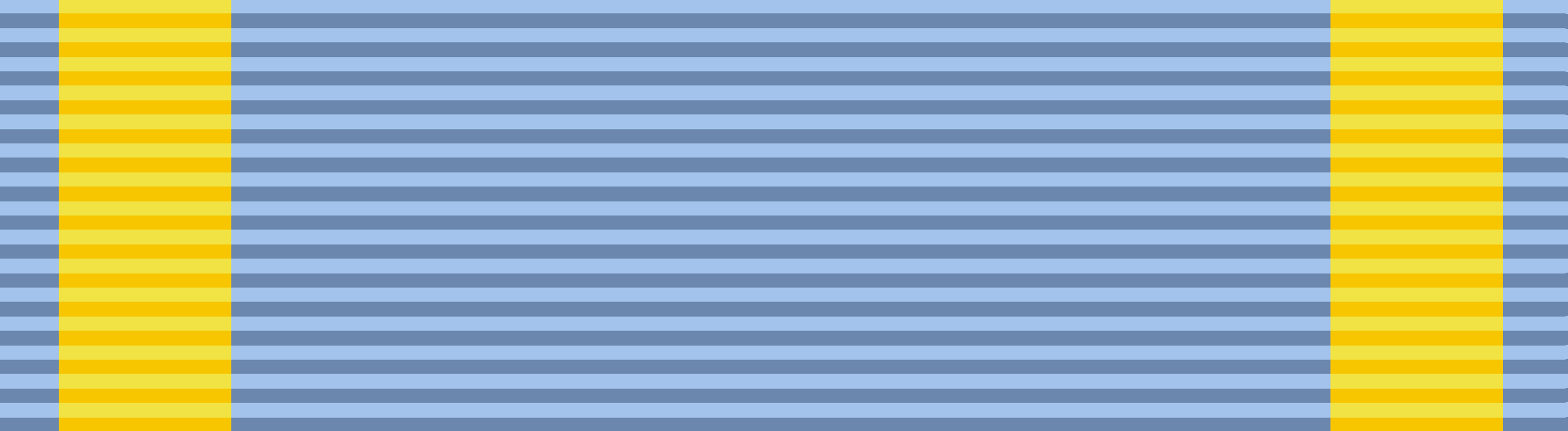
  - Member 2nd Class of the Order of Prince Yaroslav the Wise (21 October 2022)

Political offices
Preceded by Wolfgang Schäuble	President of the Bundestag; 2021–2025	Succeeded by Julia Klöckner
