= Ahlen =

- Town
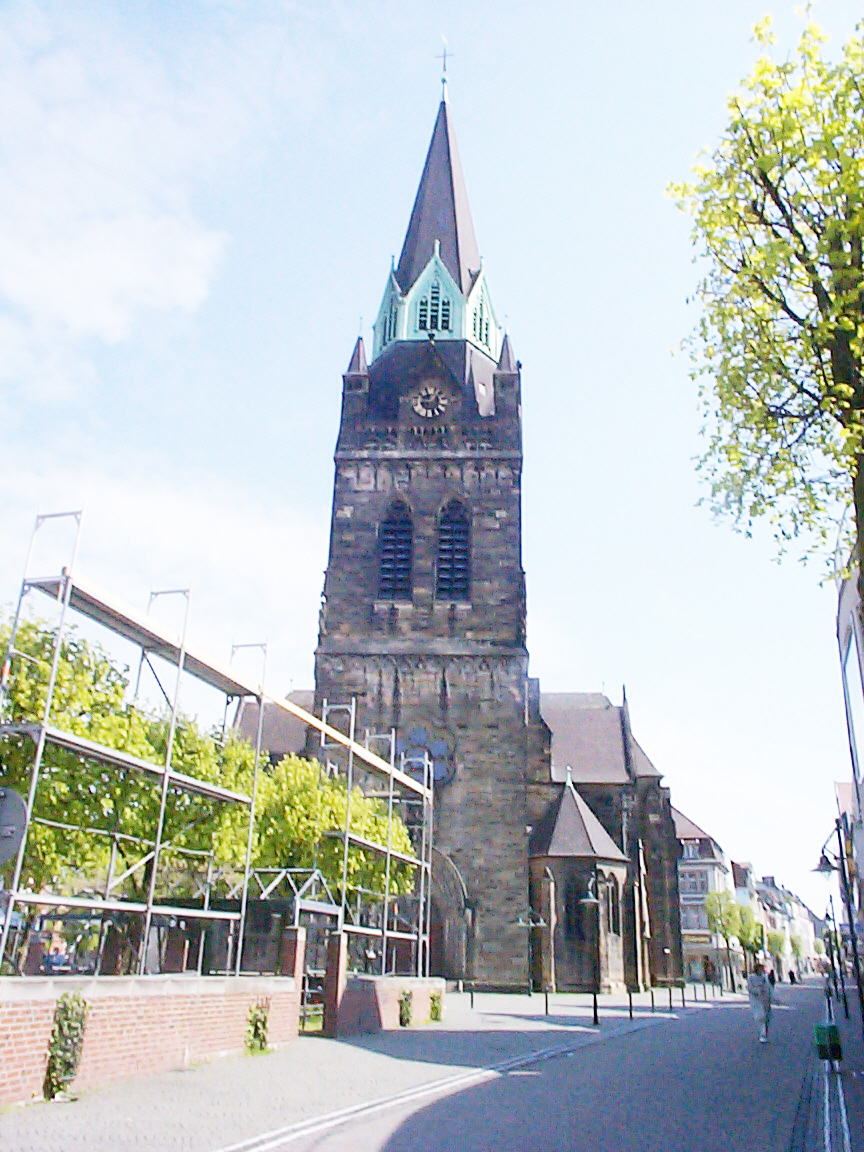
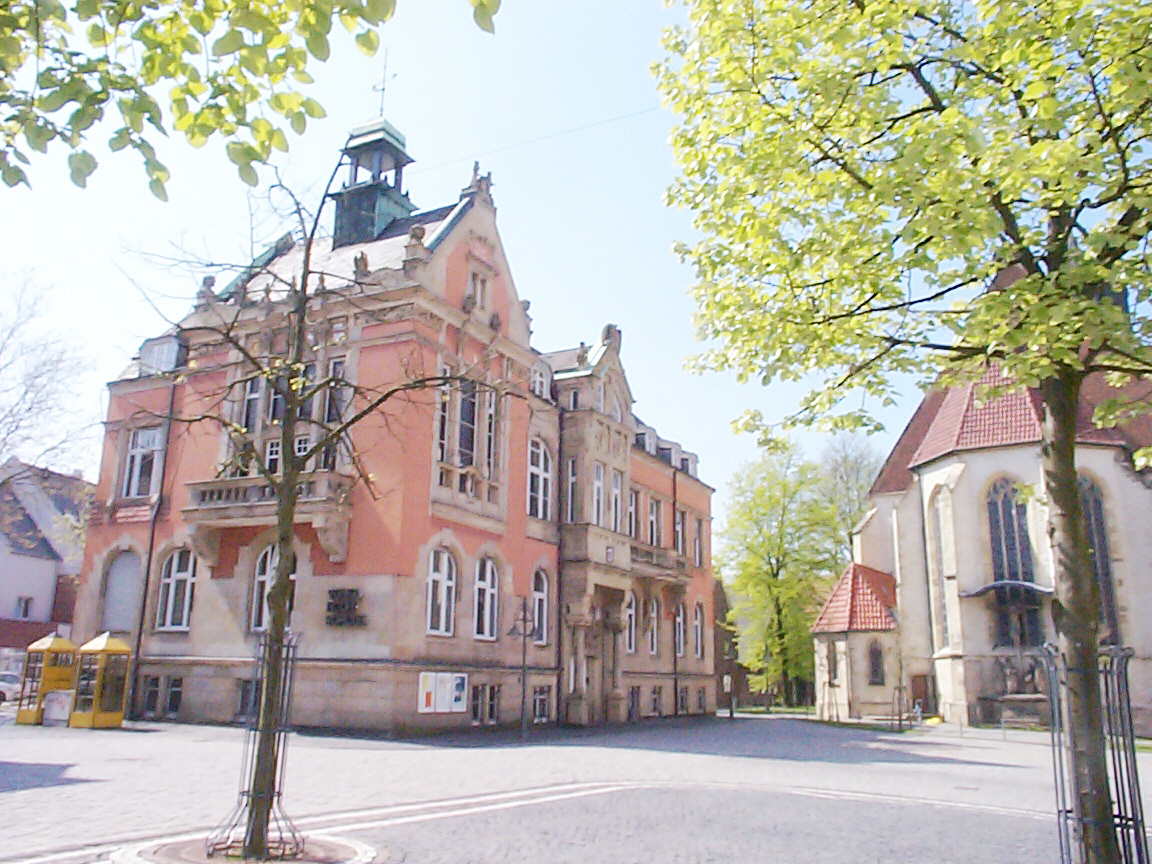
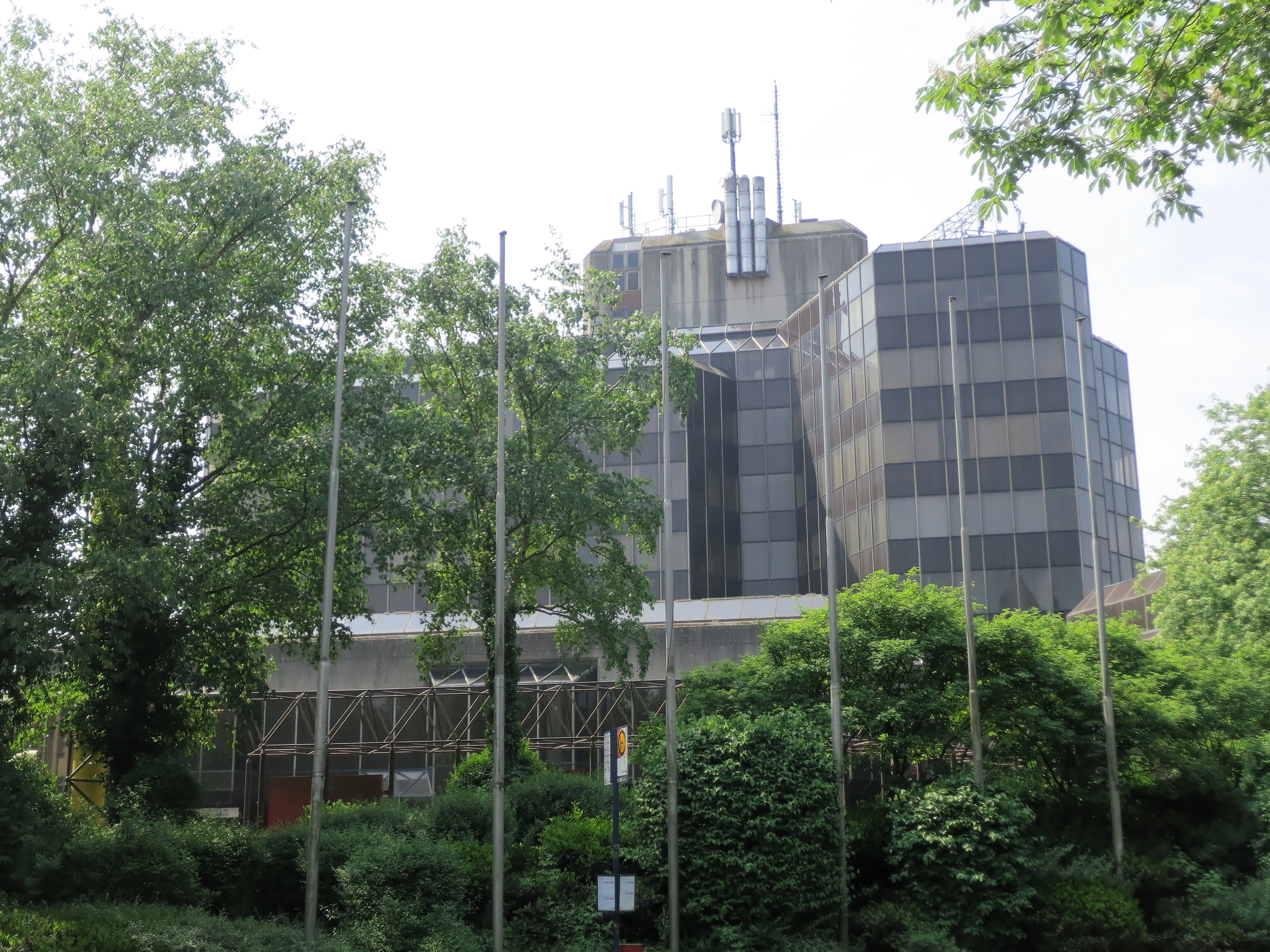
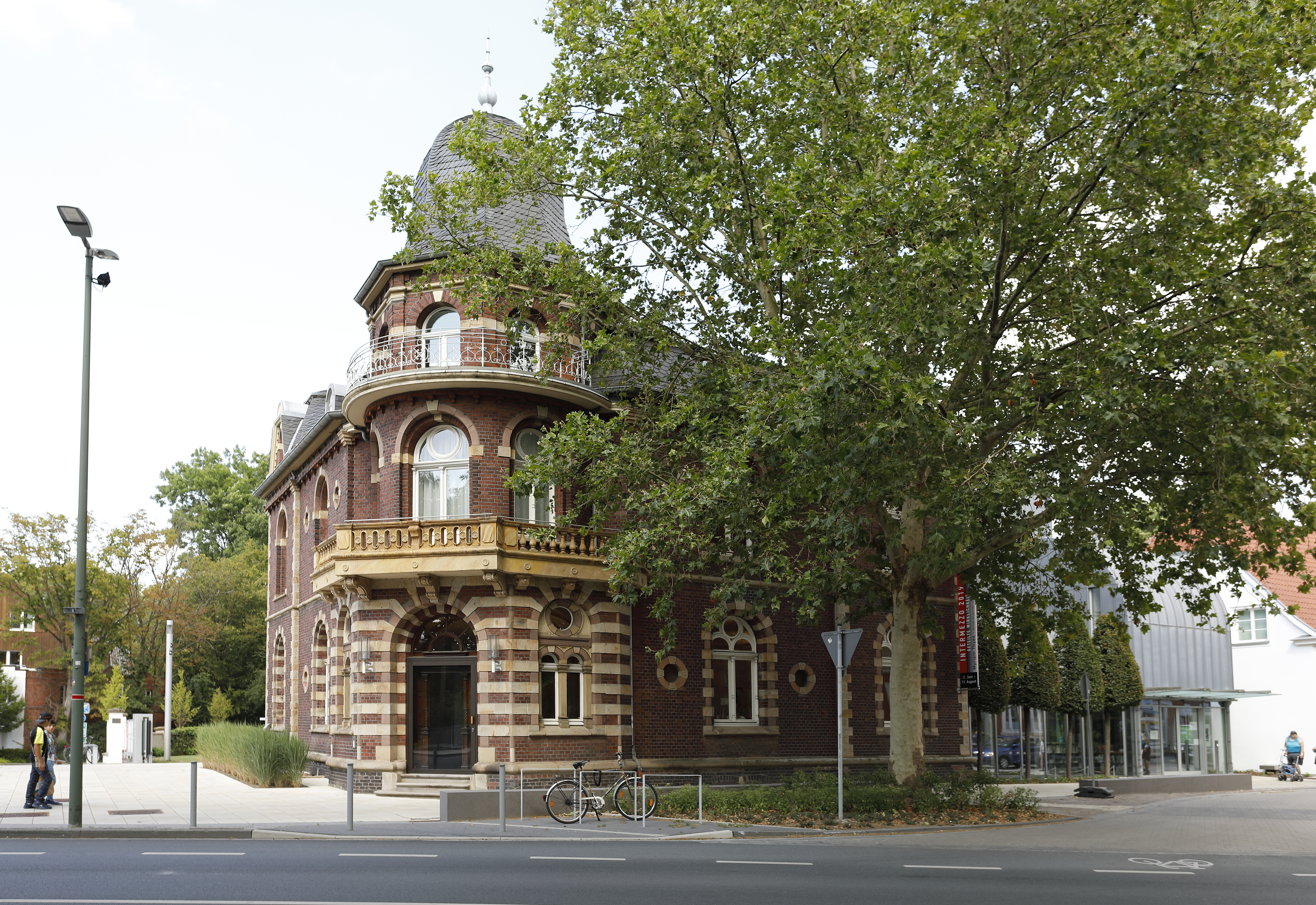
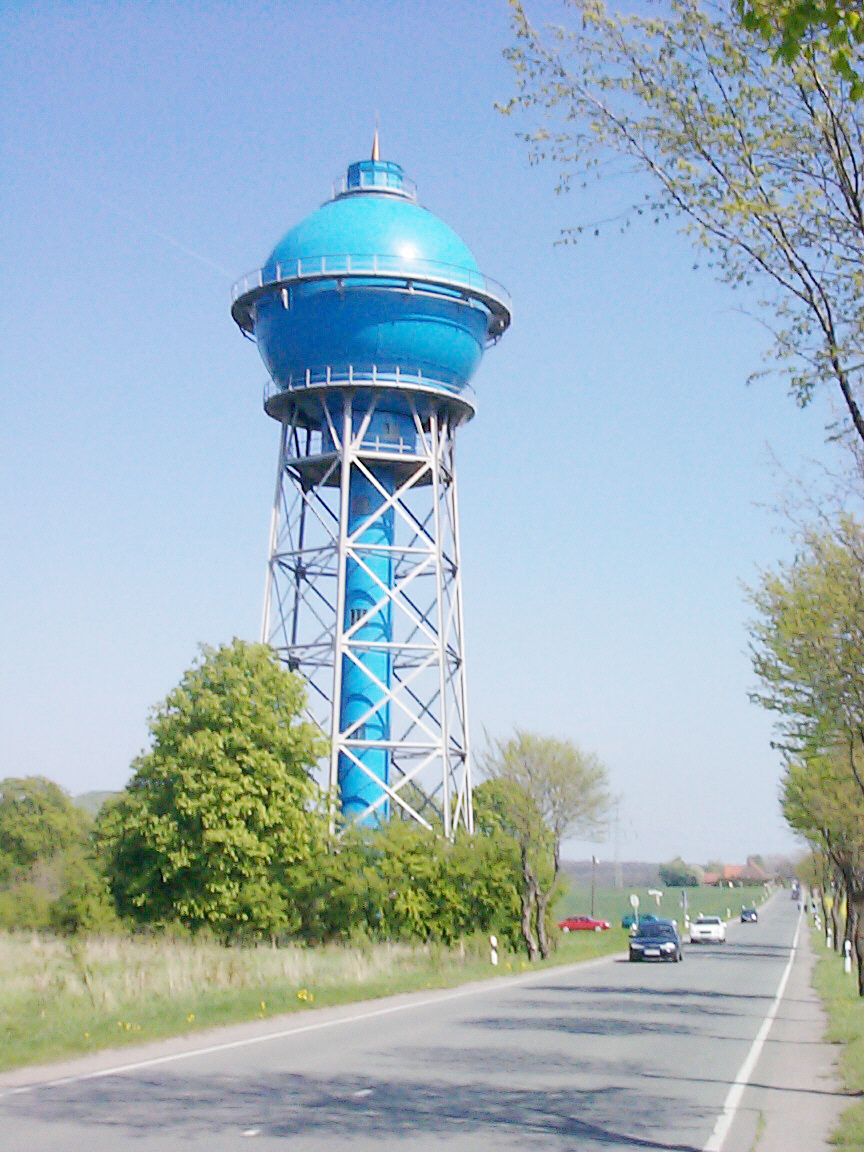
- St. Marien Church Old town hall of Ahlen Current city hall Kunstmuseum Ahlen (Museum of art) Ahlen water tower

- Coat of arms

- Location of Ahlen within Warendorf district
- Interactive map of Ahlen
- Location within Germany Location within North Rhine-Westphalia
- Coordinates: 51°45′48″N 7°53′28″E
- Country: Germany
- State: North Rhine-Westphalia
- Admin. region: Münster
- District: Warendorf

Government
  - Mayor (2025–30): Matthias Harman (CDU)

Area
  - Total: 123.13 km^{2} (47.54 sq mi)
- Elevation: 80 m (260 ft)

Population (2025-12-31)
  - Total: 52,387
  - Density: 425.46/km^{2} (1,101.9/sq mi)
- Time zone: UTC+01:00 (CET)
  - Summer (DST): UTC+02:00 (CEST)
- Postal codes: 59227, 59229
- Dialling codes: 02382, 02388, 02528
- Vehicle registration: WAF, BE
- Website: www.ahlen.de

Ahlen (German pronunciation: [ˈaːlən]; Westphalian: Aulen) is a town in North Rhine-Westphalia, Germany, 30 km southeast of Münster. Ahlen is part of the District of Warendorf and is economically the most important town in that district. Ahlen is part of the larger Münster region, and of the historic Münsterland area. The nearby villages of Dolberg, Vorhelm and Tönnishäuschen are part of Ahlen, as well. The largest neighboring town is the city of Hamm to the southwest.

== Geography ==
=== Neighbouring towns ===
Surrounding Ahlen are the towns of Sendenhorst, Ennigerloh, Beckum, Lippetal, Heessen (District of the city of Hamm) and Drensteinfurt.

=== Town districts ===
- Ahlen (downtown) with the farming communities of Borbein, Brockhausen, Ester, Halene, Oestrich and Rosendahl (area of the former town sections of Alt- and Neuahlen) all make up the core of the town.

=== Outlying villages ===
- Dolberg
- Vorhelm
- Tönnishäuschen

== History ==
=== Early times ===
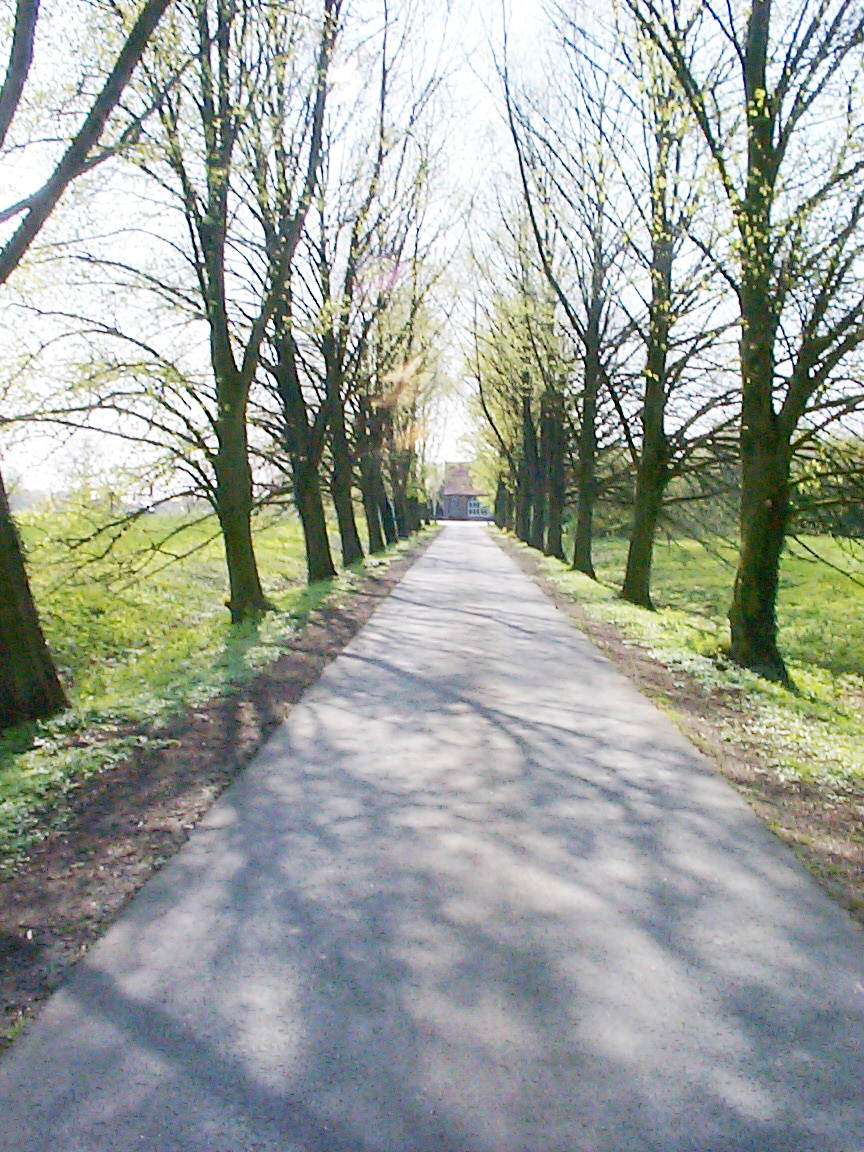
Driveway at House Vorhelm

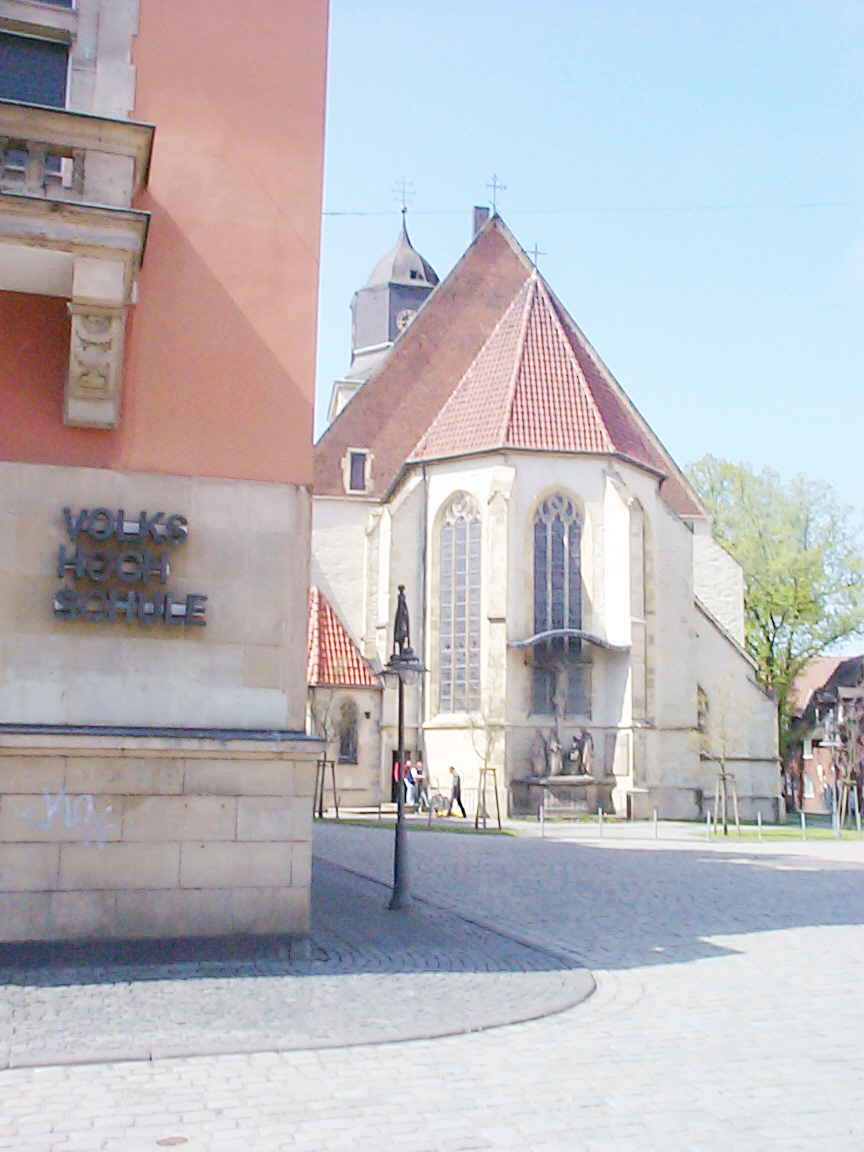
St. Bartholomäus Church in Ahlen

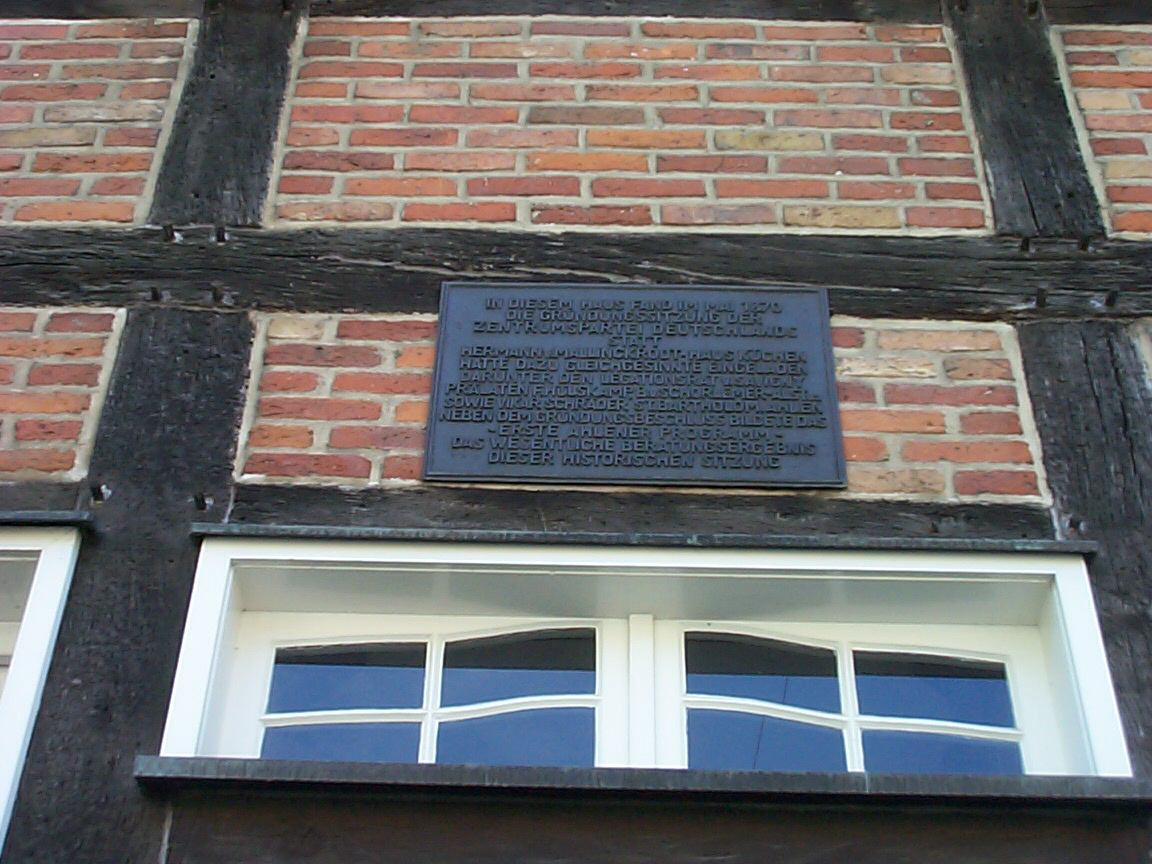
Plaque commemorating the founding of the Zentrumspartei

The first recorded mention of Ahlen is in the Vita Liudgeri, dating to about the year 850. The reason for the name, which means "eels", are unknown. An eel bedecked with a crown and feathers is on the town's coat of arms.

The start of settlement was likely due to there being a crossing over the river Werse, which was also the crossing of two key roads (Hamm–Ahlen–Warendorf and Beckum–Ahlen–Herbern), and the beginning of a third road (Ahlen–Münster). In its early centuries, the fledgling settlement was built around an episcopal court. Within the safe haven of this church fortification, the first settlers were craftsmen and merchants who traded with the local farmers and peasants of the court. Long-distance trading started in the second half of the 12th century — proof being the names of Ahlen merchants found on invoices from merchants in Lübeck. Ahlen was also part of the north German Hanse. During this time a town wall with five towers was built (about 1271). The stripping away of the town wall had begun in the year 1765 and the last hint of it was gone by 1929.

Ahlen grew quickly during the 13th century and in or about the year 1285, the population was so high that a new church (St. Marien) was founded next to the old one (St. Bartholomäus). This leads to the likelihood that Ahlen was one of the 18 biggest towns in Westphalia, at that time. However, the town's growth was hindered in the 14th century by the Black Death. According to the town's census book of 1389, only 63 families were left in Ahlen. But the town rebounded. In 1454, a citizen list showed 212 families living in Ahlen; seven noble families and their attendants lived in the episcopal court as well. Based on this number of families, a calculated population estimate of 1,300 citizens would be realistic. By this time the town had four quarters — all of which being about the same size and each quarter being named after its own town gate. Each quarter was responsible for defending its part of the town wall and gate.

During the 16th century, there were three plague epidemics in 1505, 1551 and 1592; leprosy also killed many people. In the year 1571, the mayor and the council decided to build a special hospital for leprosy. Disastrous fires in 1483, 1668 and 1744 were responsible for further halting Ahlen's growth.

About 20 documents of witch trials during the time from 1574 until 1652 survive. The hunt for witches started in 1574 with the death of four women. Thereafter, Peter Kleikamp was charged with being a werewolf; he was tortured and burned alive on the pyre. In 1616, Christian zum Loe was charged with wizardry; he went insane and died while in jail. The last known case was in 1652 against Anna Sadelers; she was tortured, burned alive on the pyre and beheaded.

=== National Socialism and World War II ===
In 1938 the people of Ahlen destroyed the Ahlen synagogue. By November 1938, there were no more Jews in Ahlen.

== Population ==
Historical population

Year	Pop.	±% p.a.
1965	51,328	—
1970	53,366	+0.78%
1975	54,202	+0.31%
1980	54,190	−0.00%
1985	52,411	−0.67%
1990	54,169	+0.66%
1995	55,785	+0.59%

Year	Pop.	±% p.a.
2000	55,631	−0.06%
2005	55,104	−0.19%
2010	53,414	−0.62%
2015	52,287	−0.43%
2020	52,635	+0.13%
2025	52,387	−0.09%

Source: Landesdatabank Nordrhein-Westfalen

== Politics ==
=== Town Council ===
Party	Result of election
CDU	50,94% (−1,3 Points)
SPD	35,36% (−5,5 Points)
Grüne	8,12% (+3,9 Points)
FDP	5,58% (+3,0 Points)

=== Coat of arms ===
Blazon: “In red, a gold crowned, inwardly curved, seven-fold winged silver eel. Above the coat of arms a three-tower wall crown with gate. ”The oldest seal shows the pious eel in the city gate, above it Saint Bartholomew. This saint is the patron saint of Ahlen. The seal has appeared since the 13th century: Certificate v. 21 May 1255 - "The city of Ahlen enters into a state of peace with the city of Cologne". Since the 17th century, only the eel has been represented, both in the city coat of arms and in the seal. In its current form, the coat of arms was awarded by the Prussian state on 5 December 1910.

=== Mayors ===
==== 1809–1945 ====
- 1809–1813 Bernard Heinrich Hahues
- 1813–1817 Bernard Anton von Hatzfeld
- 1817–1822 Heinrich Anton Nacke
- 1823–1856 Franz Wächter
- 1857–1863 Theodor von Cloedt
- 1863–1869 Wilhelm Diederich
- 1869–1870 Ludwig Fry
- 1870–1898 Johann Heinrich Hagemann
- 1898–1923 Eduard Corneli
- 1923–1934 Georg Rasche
- 1934–1937 Franz Hackethal
- 1938–1945 Otto Jansen

==== Honorary Mayors 1946–1996 ====
- 1946–1946 Friedrich Niemeyer
- 1946–1948 Hermann Dreisilker (Waldmann)
- 1948–1950 Hugo Stoffers
- 1951–1957 Heinrich Lenfert
- 1957–1969 Heinrich Linnemann
- 1969–1984 Herbert Faust
- 1984–1996 Horst Jaunich

==== Full-time Mayors since 1996 ====
- 1996–1999 Günter Harms
- 1999–2015 Benedikt Ruhmöller
- 2015–2025 Alexander Berger
- since 2025 Matthias Harman

=== Town Directors/Main Civil Servants ===
- 1945–1945 Wilhelm Buschhoff (set as mayor from English occupying troops in the function as town director)
- 1945–1951 Wilhelm Kiwit
- 1951–1963 Hugo Stoffers
- 1963–1975 Johannes Baldauf
- 1975–1985 Walter Priesnitz
- 1985–1995 Gerd Willamowski
- 2008 Benedikt Ruhmöller

== Economy and Administration ==
One of the best known companies in Ahlen is Franz Kaldewei GmbH & Co. KG, one of the biggest bathtub manufacturers worldwide. Also well known is LR Health & Beauty Systems, which was bought by Apax Partners in 2004.

=== Transport ===
Ahlen station is on the Hamm–Minden railway and is served every hour by the Rhein-Weser-Express and the Ems-Börde-Bahn.

=== Education ===
==== Elementary schools ====
- Albert-Schweitzer-Schule
- Augustin-Wibbelt-Schule in the quarter Vorhelm
- Barbaraschule
- Diesterwegschule
- Don-Bosco-Schule
- Freiligrath Grundschule
- Lambertischule in the quarter Dolberg
- Ludgerischule
- Marienschule
- Martinschule
- Paul-Gerhardt-Schule

==== Secondary Modern Schools ====
- GHS Bodelschwinghschule
- Overbergschule
- Geschwister-Scholl-Schule

==== Junior High School (ages 10 to 16) ====
- Städtische Realschule Ahlen (closed)
- Städtische Sekundarschule (closed)
- Therese-Münsterteicher Gesamtschule (former Städtische Gesamtschule)

The Sekundarschule and TMG used the building of the former Realschule

==== High schools ====
- Gymnasium St. Michael
- Städtisches Gymnasium Ahlen

==== Comprehensive School ====
- Fritz-Winter-Gesamtschule

==== Special Needs School ====
- Johanna-Rose-Schule

==== Vocational Schools ====
- Berufskolleg Ahlen
- Berufskolleg St. Michael
- Fachschulen für Heilerziehungspflege der Caritas-Trägergesellschaft Nord
- Fachseminar für Altenpflege Gemeinnütziges Bildungszentrum GmbH
- Krankenpflegeschule im St.-Franziskus-Hospital Berufskolleg Ahlen

== Places of interest ==
=== Buildings ===
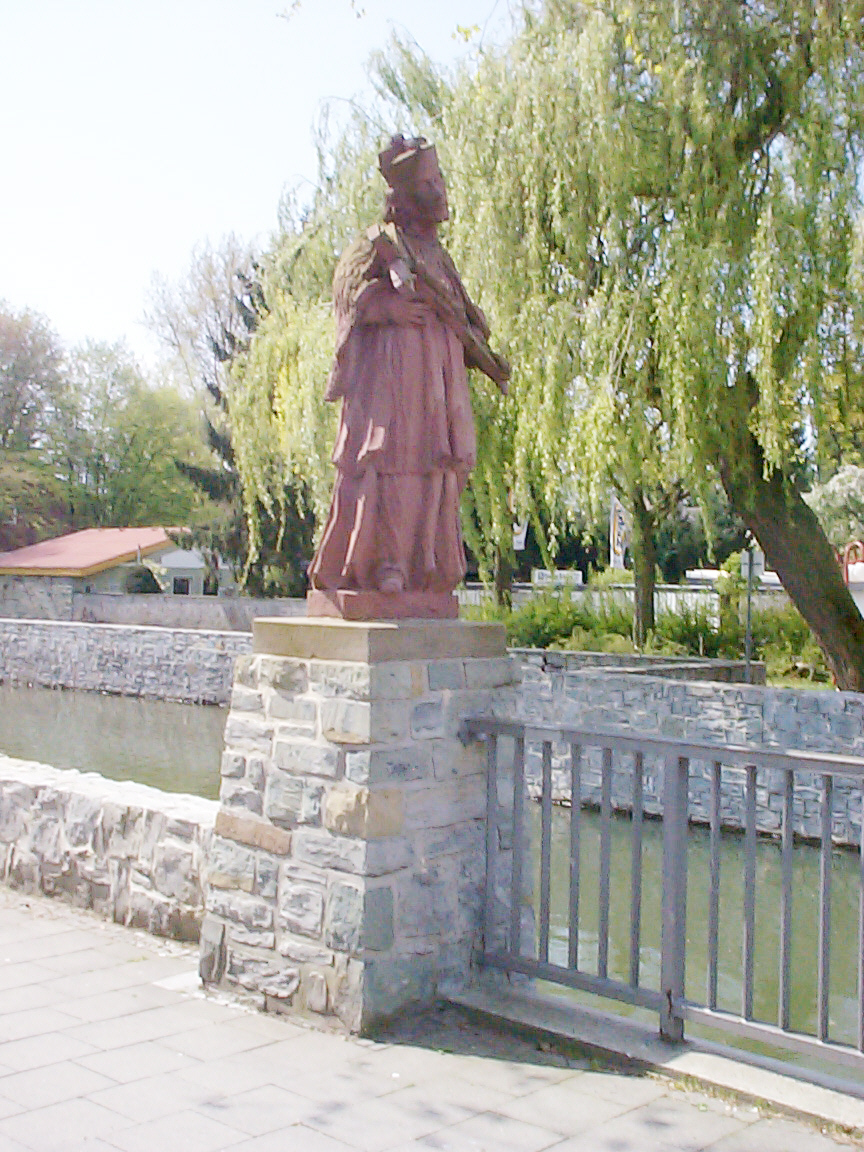
Saint John of Nepomuk

- St. Bartholomäus Catholic Church
- St. Marien Catholic Church
- Residential Buildings
- Burgmannshöfe
- Ahlen Water Tower

=== Museums ===
- Heimatmuseum
- Kunstmuseum
- Fritz Winter-Haus

=== Clubs ===
- Rot Weiss Ahlen
- KunstVerein Ahlen
- Initiative Bürgerzentrum Schuhfabrik e.V.
- Ditib Ahlen Sporkulübü (ASK Ahlen)
- ASG Aramäer Ahlen 1983 e.V.
- Ahlener Sport Gemeinschaft e.V. (ASG)
- Vorwärts Ahlen
- FSG Ahlen
- Westfalia Vorhelm
- Eintracht Dolberg

== Economy ==
Ahlen's economy was dominated by the coal industry for nearly one century.

== Twin towns – sister cities ==
Ahlen is twinned with:

- Differdange, Luxembourg
- Penzberg, Germany
- Teltow, Germany
- Tempelhof-Schöneberg (Berlin), Germany

Ahlen is a member of the Hanse.

== Notable people ==
- Max Reimann (1898-1977), politician and member of the Bundestag
- Andreas Dombret (born 1960), Board member of German central bank Deutsche Bundesbank
- Curro Torres (born 1976), footballer
- Lamya Kaddor (born 1978), writer and scholar of Islamic studies of Syrian ancestry, member of the Bundestag
- Erkan Teper (born 1982), professional boxer
- Alexander Klaws (born 1983), singer
- LaVive's band member Sarah Rensing is from Ahlen
- Hans Blomberg (born 1977), radio moderator and music expert
- Christian Süß (born 1985), table tennis player
