= N26 =

German neobank

N26 Bank SE
- Formerly: Papayer GmbH (2013-2014), Number26 GmbH (2014–2016)
- Industry: Financial services
- Founded: 2013; 13 years ago
- Founders: Valentin Stalf; Maximilian Tayenthal
- Headquarters: Voltairestr. 8, 10179, Berlin, Germany
- Area served: European Union, Iceland, Liechtenstein, Norway, Switzerland
- Key people: Mike Dargan; (CEO)
- Services: Direct bank
- Revenue: 120,375,000 euro (2021)
- Owner: N26 SE
- Number of employees: c. 1,600 (2026)
- Website: n26.com/en-eu

N26 Bank SE, doing business as N26, and formerly named Papayer GmbH, and Number26 GmbH, is a multinational German fintech and neobank company based in Berlin. N26 was founded in 2013 by Rocket Internet and operates in various European Union member states that are members of the Single Euro Payments Area (SEPA).

== History ==
Founded in August 2013 by Valentin Stalf and Maximilian Tayenthal as a fintech startup under the name Papayer GmbH, N26 initially offered a prepaid Mastercard financial management solution aimed at teenagers, which was launched in February 2014. After securing €2 million in seed funding in June 2014, the company changed its name to Number26 and discontinued the teenage finance product to launch a general-purpose transaction account.

N26 launched their banking product on October 20, 2014, in a private beta. Shortly after launch, they received €10 million in a Series A round, at which point the service has been available in Germany and Austria. During their initial operations, N26 did not hold a banking license; instead, it provided an interface to a backend provided by Wirecard. In July 2016, it re-branded as N26 Bank, after receiving a banking license they applied for 9 months prior by the German regulator BaFin. The company stated that they will start operating on their own infrastructure in autumn that year. At this point, they had over 200,000 customers.

In June 2016, N26 terminated a number of customer accounts, citing suspected money laundering and cost of high-volume ATM withdrawals. The same month, N26 raised $40 million in a Series B round.

When N26 started asking customers to transfer their accounts to the bank's own infrastructure in November 2016, customers had to get a new account IBAN. Accounts previously held by Wirecard would be terminated. However, many customers reported issues during account migration, with many issues to get in touch with their customer support. N26 apologized and was transparent about what happened, saying they were overwhelmed by a large amount of customer support queries, even after initial preparation. However, they did not comment on other reported issues such as funds going missing and other software bugs.

N26 made transaction accounts available across 17 Eurozone countries in December 2016. Shortly after, N26 reached more than 300,000 users in March 2017, at which point they were processing over 10 million credit card transactions per year, with a transaction volume of over €3 billion.

Following this, N26 raised $160 million during a Series C round led by Chinese internet giant Tencent Holdings and Allianz X (Allianz) in March 2018. During this time, N26 claimed to have a customer base of 850,000, aiming to have 5,000,000 customers by 2020. This was followed by an additional $300 million in funding in January 2019 as part of a Series D round led by Insight Partners with Singapore's sovereign wealth fund GIC and a few existing investors also participating, putting N26 at a valuation of $2.7 billion. With its new valuation, N26 overtook Revolut as the most valuable mobile bank in Europe.

N26 started letting customers from the United States sign up for a waiting list on July 11, 2019. Due to the differences between EU and the US market, particularly in regards to regulatory schemes for financial providers, N26 partnered with Axos Financial to serve as the provider of its services, insured by the Federal Deposit Insurance Corporation. Unlike in Europe, where they are provided by MasterCard, N26 used Visa cards for U.S. customers. The following week, the company extended its series D round with an additional $170 million investment, valuing the company at $3.5 billion. In May 2020, the company announced the extension of its recent Series D round with an additional $100M raised at the same valuation.

On 11 February 2020, N26 announced that it would cease doing business in the United Kingdom and close all accounts effective 15 April, due to the UK withdrawal from the European Union. The company cited the fact that European financial institutions can no longer operate in the region without applying for a banking license in the UK (rather than being allowed to operate under its EU license), as well as "the timings and framework outlined in the EU Withdrawal Agreement".

Following internal conflicts between employees and the N26 management, the workers of N26's Berlin subsidiaries, N26 GmbH and N26 Operations GmbH, elected works councils to represent the employees of the Berlin offices in November and December 2020. The elections saw approximately 30% voter turnout, resulting in eleven elected works council members. These elections followed attempts to establish a works council in summer 2020, which were reportedly met with resistance from N26 management, including legal actions such as interim injunctions attempting to prevent employee meetings and the establishment of the electoral committee ("Wahlvorstand").

In January 2021 N26 announced the upcoming appointment of former ProSiebenSat.1 Media and Zalando executive Jan Kemper as the company's Chief Financial Officer. In January 2022, the bank announced that Kemper will also be taking over the role of Chief Operating Officer in addition to his role as CFO.

In October 2021 N26 raised $900 million in a Series E round led by Third Point Ventures and Coatue Management, and joined by Dragoneer Investment Group as well as existing N26 investors. The funding round valued the digital bank at $9 billion.

In November 2021 N26 announced that it would be pulling out of the United States in January 2022, leading to the closure of approximately 500,000 accounts. American customers were no longer be able to use its app after January 11, 2022. The withdrawal was to focus on N26's core European business. The company confirmed this in an official press release and N26's official corporate blog.

In November 2022 N26 changed its legal form from a German Limited Liability Company (Gesellschaft mit beschränkter Haftung – GmbH) to a German Stock Corporation (Aktiengesellschaft – AG). At the same time, a five-member board of directors was appointed, chaired by Marcus W. Mosen. Other members are Jörg Gerbig, Dr. Barbara Roth, Dr. Julian Deutz and Dr. Robert Killian.

In the first half of 2024, N26 partners with Upvest, an investment API provider, to launch a stock and ETF trading product. This product will initially debut in Austria before expanding to the German market.

In April 2025, N26 got featured in the Forbes World's Best Bank list in Germany. Later in August 2025, co-founder and co-chief executive officer Valentin Stalf stepped down from his role as co-CEO due to conflicts with investors concerned with further sanctions from BaFin.

Following a 2024 audit, the Federal Financial Supervisory Authority assigned a supervisor for N26 on 15 December 2025 and imposed several business restrictions, including a ban on new mortgage loans in the Netherlands and a requirement to increase financial reserves. This regulatory pressure coincided with a major leadership restructuring: Maximilian Tayenthal stepped down from his operational duties as co-CEO on 31 December 2025. In April 2026, Mike Dargan took over as the new CEO, replacing the previous leadership duo of Marcus Mosen and Tayenthal to lead the bank's strategic "cleanup".

== Company ==
According to N26 it employs more than 1,600 people at its locations in Amsterdam, Berlin, Barcelona, Belgrade, Madrid, Milan, Paris, Vienna, New York, Greece and São Paulo.

In 2025, N26 announced the departure of its co-founders from executive management. Valentin Stalf stepped down as co-chief executive in August, while Maximilian Tayenthal is expected to leave his role by the end of the year. Andreas Dombret, a former Deutsche Bundesbank executive board member, has been nominated as chair of the supervisory board, pending regulatory approval. Marcus Mosen, the current chair, will assume the position of co-chief executive.

As of August 2025, Valentin Stalf and Maximilian Tayenthal together retained ownership of roughly one-fifth of N26's equity.

=== Availability ===
N26 offers its services in 21 European countries. The mobile application and customer service are available in German, French, Italian, and Spanish, with English offered as a standard option regardless of the customer's residency.

N26 closed its business in April 2020 in the UK. In November 2021, they also announced that they would pull out of the American market from January 2022 closing all (approx.) 500,000 accounts there.

== Controversies ==
=== Account closures ===
In October 2022, it was reported that over 100 customers of N26 had their bank accounts closed unexpectedly without any prior notice from the company. Business Insider reported that several customers affected included Ukrainian refugees who fled to Western Europe due to the Russian war in Ukraine, one of whom claimed that she had lost access to €15,000 and that N26 demanded proof of her identity as a condition of returning her funds. While many more customers continued to discover that their accounts had been unexpectedly frozen, N26 stated on their corporate blog that account closures, which the company refers to as "blocks", are made in order to prevent crimes from customers who pose a high-risk to the company.

=== Anti-money laundering compliance issues ===
Following an inquiry made by several German media outlets that reported on several faults within N26's onboarding process, the bank caught the attention of the German Financial Supervisory Authority (BaFin) in 2018.

In May 2021, BaFin ordered N26 to improve its anti-money laundering and anti-terrorism mechanisms. BaFin later found that N26 failed to report illegal transactions to them in a timely manner and fined the company €4.25 million in June of that year. Additionally, BaFin installed a supervisor in the bank and also limited the number of new customers the bank could take on to 50,000 per month. This was then lifted to 60,000 new customers allowed in 2023, to which the growth cap was ultimately removed in June 2024.

In 2022, the Bank of Italy barred N26 from taking on new customers following an investigation that revealed the company had failed to install a suitable anti-money laundering system up to Italian standards. The company was also prevented from offering new products and services to already existing clients in Italy which included crypto assets.

Due to heavy scrutiny from both German and Italian authorities, German financial group Allianz announced intentions to sell its 5% stake in the company in April 2023. Later in July, 2023, BaFin announced an extension to N26's probationary period due to further failures to meet German financial compliance standards.

In July 2025, BaFin threatened the company with new sanctions after finding additional regulatory violations not previously addressed or resolved by the company. As a result, investors lost confidence in the executive team and several changes were made at the executive level including the removal of co-founder Valentin Stalf from his role as a co-CEO and would instead serve on the regulatory board for the company.

=== Business strategy ===
In the span of four years, N26 entered and then abruptly exited from the United Kingdom and the United States: two of the company's largest foreign financial markets.

In 2018 the company launched its mobile banking app in the United Kingdom still riding on its German banking license valid within European Union member states (of which the UK was still a member of). Less than two years later in 2020, the company shut down its app and services in the United Kingdom citing complications with the Brexit political situation and UK's incompatible financial regulation standards. This move was met with criticism of negligence from financial analysts due to the 2016 referendum for Brexit, had already taken place and the British government confirmed the results in 2017, a year before the company entered the British market. Nonetheless, the company held firm on Brexit being the driving factor.

In 2019, N26 launched its application in the United States with FDIC-insured banking services provided by Axos Financial. In November 2021, N26 announced that they would be ceasing operations in the US to focus more on the European markets. All American accounts were eventually closed in early 2022. Forbes magazine accused N26 of failing in the American market due to strategic failures and lack of ingenuity for virtual banking products.

In 2019, N26 announced their plans to enter the Latin American market and set up their first offices in Brazil in 2020. Product testing commenced in 2022. In May 2023, N26 was released to customers in Brazil, but in November of that year, the company announced that they would ultimately cease operations in South America.

In March 2023, Financial Times criticized the company for its corporate governance's high turnover rate. Other financial news outlets have also noted that its failures in the UK and US markets, as well as sanctions by German and Italian regulators contributed to the company's delay to file for an initial public offering but also secure funding from additional investors from in Germany and Italy.

=== Security incidents ===
In December 2016 the research fellow in computer science from the University of Erlangen-Nuremberg Vincent Haupert demonstrated how he could take advantage of security vulnerabilities in order to get access to N26 users' accounts. Haupert had already notified N26 of the vulnerabilities back in September 2016. N26 acknowledged the issues and claimed that they had been fixed before they became public, adding that no user account had actually been compromised.

In March 2019, German media reported that customers who had their account credentials stolen found it difficult to contact the bank and resolve the situation. Customer advocates reported that there was a growing number of complaints from phishing victims who were unable to access their accounts and found it difficult to contact the bank. In a widely reported case N26 took more than two weeks to restore access for a customer who had €80,000 stolen from his account. The reports raised the question if the rapid growth of the bank had left it ill-equipped to deal with the increasing number of support cases.

=== Works council ===
N26 management drew public criticism for its opposition to the election of works councils at its Berlin-based subsidiaries, N26 GmbH and N26 Operations GmbH in August 2020. According to the employees, trust in management was on a historical low. Following employee announcements of a company-wide election to form an election committee ("Wahlvorstand"), N26 obtained a temporary injunction seeking to postpone the meeting, arguing that the COVID-19 hygiene concept did not meet the legal requirements. Trade unionists stated that infection protection regulations should not be used to obstruct unwanted employee representation. Johanna Wenckebach, Head of the labor law department at the Hugo Sinzheimer Institute, stated in an interview that hygiene regulations served as a pretext for preventing an event. She said that the company's subsequent organization of an alternative event demonstrated this. Wenckebach also stated that N26 management, in a widely circulated email, explicitly stated their opposition to a works council due to concerns about confrontations and process delays, saying "it is against the values of N26".

To protect the named employees from further legal action, the trade union Ver.di stepped in to host the meeting at an outside venue. After N26 filed another injunction targeting Ver.di, IG Metall, another trade union organizing workers in the tech sector, called for the meeting instead.

The election committee was established in a meeting that took place at the Hofbräu Berlin. The company attempted to stop the meeting through legal means through a second injunction, claiming the venue lacked an adequate hygiene concept, but failed. During the meeting, the police were called over hygiene concerns, but found no violations of current COVID-19 safety measures after the venue operator, Björn Schwarz, confirmed having an approved safety and hygiene plan.

The founders of N26 criticized the takeover of the event by IG Metall, stating that any quickly organized election driven by external parties "would not be inclusive, safe, or representative". They stated their support for a works council but only under adherence to existing laws. They also announced that no further legal steps would be taken against the election process to de-escalate the situation.

The works councils were established in November and December 2020, with a total voter turnout of around 30%. In response, CEO Valentin Stalf apologized in a blog post, stating that N26 supports the right of employees to formal representation.

In May 2022 the employees elected a works council for the second time. According to a media report, members of the works council subsequently reported positive results.

== See also ==
- bunq
- Klarna
- Revolut
- Wise (company)
- Neobanks in Europe
- List of banks in Germany
