= Rabeya Müller =

German Muslim religious educator (1957–2024)

- Born: 1957; Mayen, Rhineland-Palatinate, West Germany
- Died: 19 February 2024 (aged 67)
- Known for: Islamic educator

Rabeya Müller, also Rabeya Müller-Haque (1957 – 19 February 2024) was a German Islamic scholar, Muslim theologian, imam and religious educator.

She was a pioneer of Islam in Germany as one of the first female imams. She was a liberal Islamic theologian.

== Life ==
Born as Rosel Müller, she lived with her single mother and her grandparents. As a Catholic, she attended a Catholic high school in Vallendar and converted to Islam after graduating from high school in the late 1970s.

After studying education, Islamic studies (at the University of Cologne under Abdoldjavad Falaturi) and ethnology in Germany, Canada and Asia, she published works on Islam and the position of women in Islam, on Islam and the disabled and on Muslims in Germany. At the Institute for Interreligious Education and Didactics, she designed textbooks for Islamic religious education, developed teaching materials and curriculum content, worked out interreligious and intercultural educational theories and teaching concepts, trained religious educators and trained mediators. She worked as a representative of a "gender-equitable Islam" in the Center for Islamic Women's Studies and Women's Advancement, which advises Muslim women in need, including victims of domestic violence, and developed courses in the areas of self-assertion training for Muslim girls and how to deal with Muslims . Against the background of gender research, she worked on gender-specific pedagogy in Islam. Müller was director of the Cologne Institute for Interreligious Pedagogy and Didactics.

Rabeya Müller died in February 2024 after a long illness at the age of 67. She was buried on February 22, 2024, with a Muslim funeral prayer at the Südfriedhof cemetery in Cologne-Zollstock.

== Positions ==
"What she particularly praises about the Islamic concept of God is that it presupposes a mature believer. What she particularly appreciates about Islamic ethics is the centrality of justice. [She] describes herself as a 'liberal, European Muslim'."

On the occasion of the circumcision debate that began in 2012, Müller said at the 99th German Catholic Congress in 2014: “Religions must accept questions, learn to deal with them, and not always perceive them as an affront”.

== Membership ==
She was deputy chairwoman of the Center for Islamic Women's Studies and the Advancement of Women, chairwoman of the Conference of European Women Theologians initiative, first speaker of "interreligiones" - Forum for Interreligious Education, advisory board member of the International Peace School, Cologne, member of Intra, member of the Commission for Islamic Religious Education, member of the advisory board "Chair for the Religion of Islam" of the Center for Religious Studies at the University of Münster, member of the World Conference of Religions for Peace, member of the preparatory committee of the Interreligious Summer University Loccum, member of the Christian-Islamic Forum of the Christian-Islamic Society and founding member of the Liberal Islamic Union.

== Honours ==
In 2009, the school book Saphir 5/6, initiated by Müller and published together with Lamya KaddoR and Harry Harun Behr, was awarded the honorary prize of the Best European Schoolbook Award 2009 at the Frankfurt Book Fair. The reason given was: "It is recognized that Saphir presents Islam in an understandable and clear manner, connects the topics with the everyday life of young people in Germany and makes references to other religions." The book was published in August 2008 as the first German-language school book for Islamic studies in public schools. It was the first school book to be approved by the German state ministries of education for this type of teaching. Since 2008, it has been used in North Rhine-Westphalia, Bavaria, Lower Saxony and Bremen. The book is published by the Munich-based Kösel-Verlag. A large number of teachers and Islamic scholars contributed as authors to the book, which uses illustrations, graphics, photos, calligraphy and texts. The book received a great deal of media attention.

On 15 November 2017, the European Academy of Sciences and Arts awarded Rabeya Müller, Avishay Braverman and Mitri Raheb the Tolerance Rings based on Lessing's ring parable to representatives of the three Abrahamic religions to promote justice and tolerance between Christianity, Judaism and Islam.

== Publications ==
=== Books ===
- with Lamya Kaddor: Der Islam für Kinder und Erwachsene. Verlag C. H. Beck, München, 1. Auflage 2012, ISBN 978-3-406-64016-2.
- with Lamya Kaddor: Der Koran für Kinder und Erwachsene. C. H. Beck, München, 3. Auflage 2010, ISBN 978-3-406-57222-7. (Rezension der ersten Auflage 2008 bei Socialnet).
- with Maryam Frenzel: Gesundheit und Krankheit im Islam. Huda – Netzwerk für Muslimische Frauen, 2. Bonn 1999, 4. Aufl. 2004 ISBN 3-933872-01-4.

=== Editorships ===
- with Asma Barlas, Nahide Bozkurt: Der Koran neu gelesen: Feministische Interpretationen. Dokumentation. Friedrich-Ebert-Stiftung, Politische Akademie – Interkultureller Dialog, Bonn 2008, ISBN 978-3-89892-908-0.
- with Maryam Frenzel-Hassan: Das islamische Kochbuch. Frenzel-Hassan, Remagen 1992, ISBN 3-928801-00-7.

=== Textbooks ===
- (Hg. with Lamya Kaddor und Harry Harun Behr): Saphir 5/6. Religionsbuch für junge Musliminnen und Muslime. Mit Fotos und Illustrationen von Ulrike Bahl. Kösel-Verlag, München 2008, ISBN 978-3-466-50782-5. (das erste Schulbuch für Islamkunde in deutscher Sprache).
- (Hg. with Lamya Kaddor und Harry Harun Behr): Saphir 5/6. Religionsbuch für junge Musliminnen und Muslime. Lehrerkommentar Mit Fotos und Illustrationen von Ulrike Bahl. Kösel, München 2009.

=== Articles and lectures ===
- Behinderung und Integration im Islam. In: Annebelle Pithan u. a. (Hrsg.): Handbuch integrative Religionspädagogik – Reflexionen und Impulse für Gesellschaft, Schule und Gemeinde. Veröffentlichung des Comenius-Instituts. Gütersloher Verlagshaus, Gütersloh 2002, S. 184–188
- Die Angst der Deutschen vor dem Grundgesetz – Zum Zusammenleben der Kulturen in unserer Gesellschaft. In: Evangelische Frauenhilfe in Deutschland (Hrsg.): Arbeitshilfe zum Weitergeben, Globalisierung aushalten oder gestalten? Nr. 3. Düsseldorf 2001, S. 71–75
- Das Eigene und das Fremde oder das Eigene Fremde. In: Islam im Schulbuch – Dokumentation zur Fachtagung „Das Bild des Islam in deutschen Schulbüchern“ 3.–5. April 2001, Bonn. Spohr, Kandern im Schwarzwald 2001, S. 62–72.
- Islamischer Religionsunterricht – einmal anders. In: Islamischer Religionsunterricht an staatlichen Schulen in Deutschland, Praxis – Konzepte – Perspektiven. Dokumentation eines Fachgesprächs. Beauftragte der Bundesregierung für Ausländerfragen, Nr. 8, Berlin 2000, S. 88–96.
- Grundgedanken zu einem interreligiösen Unterricht aus islamischer Sicht. Kurzvortrag in der Evangelischen Akademie Mülheim an der Ruhr. IPD, Mai 2000.
- Spiritualität und Ethik im Unterricht. In: Johannes Lähnemann (Hrsg.): Spiritualität und ethische Erziehung – Erbe und Herausforderung der Religionen. Referate und Ergebnisse des Nürnberger Forums 2000. In: Pädagogische Beiträge zur Kulturbegegnung. Band 20. ebv, Hamburg 2000, S. 322–332.
- Allah ist groß – und der Religionsunterricht ein weites Feld. In: Forum Buntes Deutschland. November 1999, S. 33–36.
- Islamischer Religionsunterricht: "Lieb Vaterland …", oder was hat der Islam mit Deutschland zu tun? In: Cibedo-Beiträge. 11, 2/3, 1997, S. 67–70.
