= Valentin Stalf =

European entrepreneur (born 1985)

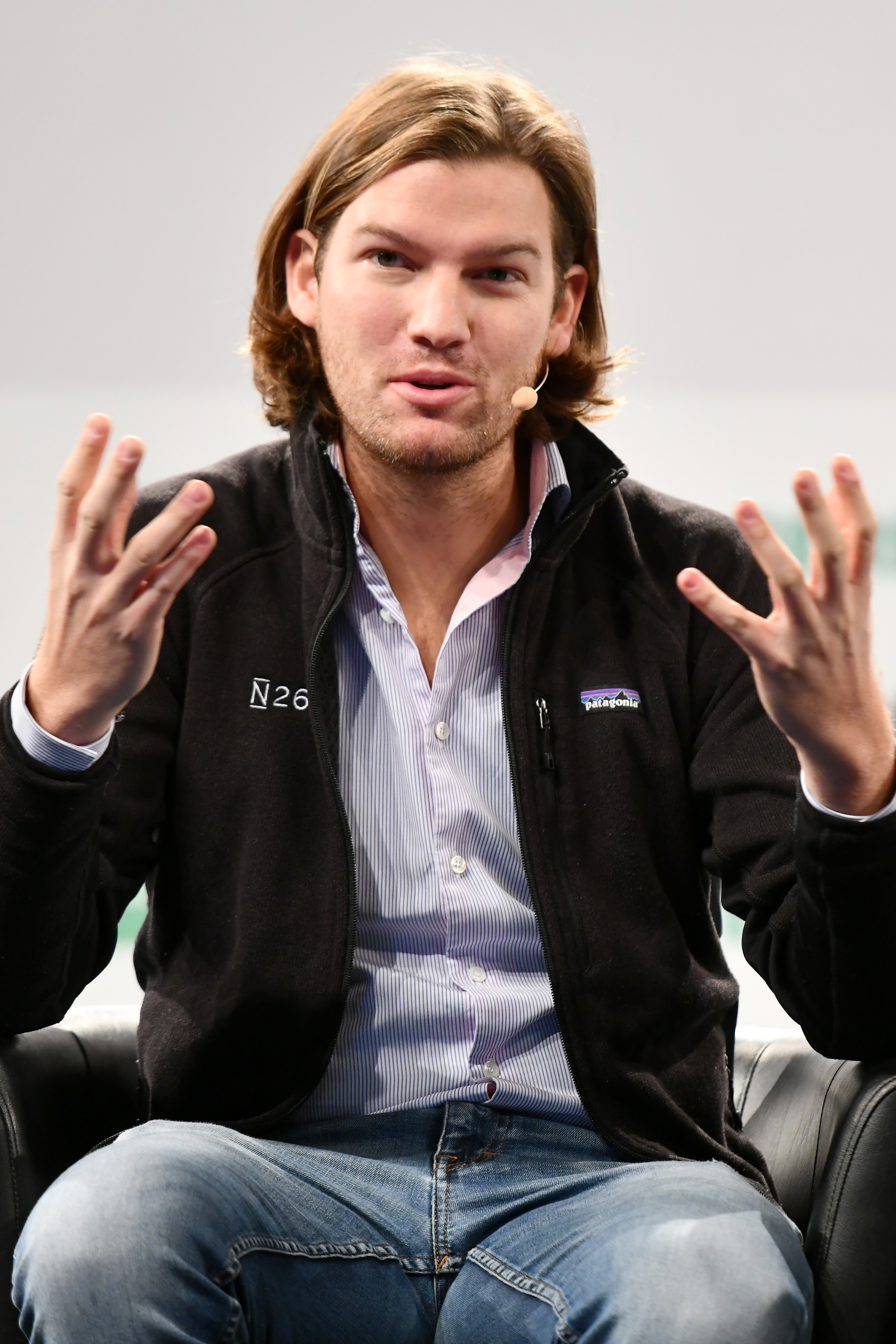
- Valentin Stalf speaks on stage during TechCrunch Disrupt Berlin 2018
- Born: 4 October 1985 (age 40); Vienna, Austria
- Occupation: entrepreneur

Valentin Stalf (born 4 October 1985, Vienna, Austria) is a European technology entrepreneur and co-founder of the digital bank N26.

== Education ==
Stalf studied accounting and finance at the University of St. Gallen (HSG) in Switzerland, and also took part in exchange programs at Sophia University in Tokyo and the Vienna University of Economics and Business. In 2012, he graduated with a master's degree in accounting and finance from HSG.

== Career ==
While still a student, Stalf worked at the investment banking division of Deutsche Bank, focusing on mergers and acquisitions, and in strategy consulting at Roland Berger. After graduation, he joined the German internet incubator Rocket Internet as an entrepreneur-in-residence. In that role, he was involved in building several financial technology ventures, including mobile payment startups Payleven and Paymill.

=== N26 ===
In February 2013, Stalf co-founded a fintech startup N26 with his long-time friend Maximilian Tayenthal. Initially launched as Papayer GmbH, the company was soon renamed Number26. In January 2015, Number26 officially launched its first mobile and web-based banking service. As a mobile-only app-based bank, Number26 quickly gained popularity in Germany and Austria. In July 2016, the company received a European banking license from the German regulator BaFin and rebranded to N26. In two years, by March 2017, the service had connected 300,000 users in 17 markets. In 2018, N26 raised significant investment and obtained full authorization to operate in the United Kingdom. In 2019, it launched services in the United States. By January 2020, N26 had 5 million users. By 2021, the bank had more than 7 million customers across 25 countries and was valued at $9 billion, making it Germany's most valuable fintech startup. By 2025, the company has raised over $1.8 billion in funding.

Between 2019 and 2020, N26 faced operational challenges in its expansion markets. Due to evolving regulatory conditions following Brexit, it ceased operations in the UK. In 2021, the company also exited the US market. The same year, BaFin identified deficiencies in the bank's internal procedures and imposed a €4.25 million fine, while temporarily limiting customer acquisition to 50,000 new accounts per month until compliance issues were addressed. In spring 2022, Italy's central bank barred N26 from opening new accounts in the country due to anti-money laundering shortcomings. In 2024, BaFin fined N26 €9.2 million for delays in reporting suspicious transactions the previous year but lifted three-year-old cap on N26's growth. These compliance issues raised concerns among investors.

In August 2025, Stalf announced he would step back from day-to-day operations. He resigned as CEO and is expected to join the company's supervisory board following a six-month transition period.

As of August 2025, Valentin Stalf and his co-founder Maximilian Tayenthal together retained approximately one-fifth of N26's equity.

== Recognition ==
In 2018, the University of St. Gallen named Stalf "Entrepreneur of the Year". The same year, the German business newspaper Handelsblatt, together with investor Frank Thelen, awarded him the title of "Young Entrepreneur of the Year".

== Personal life ==
Stalf lives in Berlin. He enjoys spending time in nature. Since 2018, he has served as an invited member of the advisory board of the Vienna University of Economics and Business (WU Vienna), his alma mater.
