= Hamm-Heessen station =

Railway station in Germany

Hamm Heessen
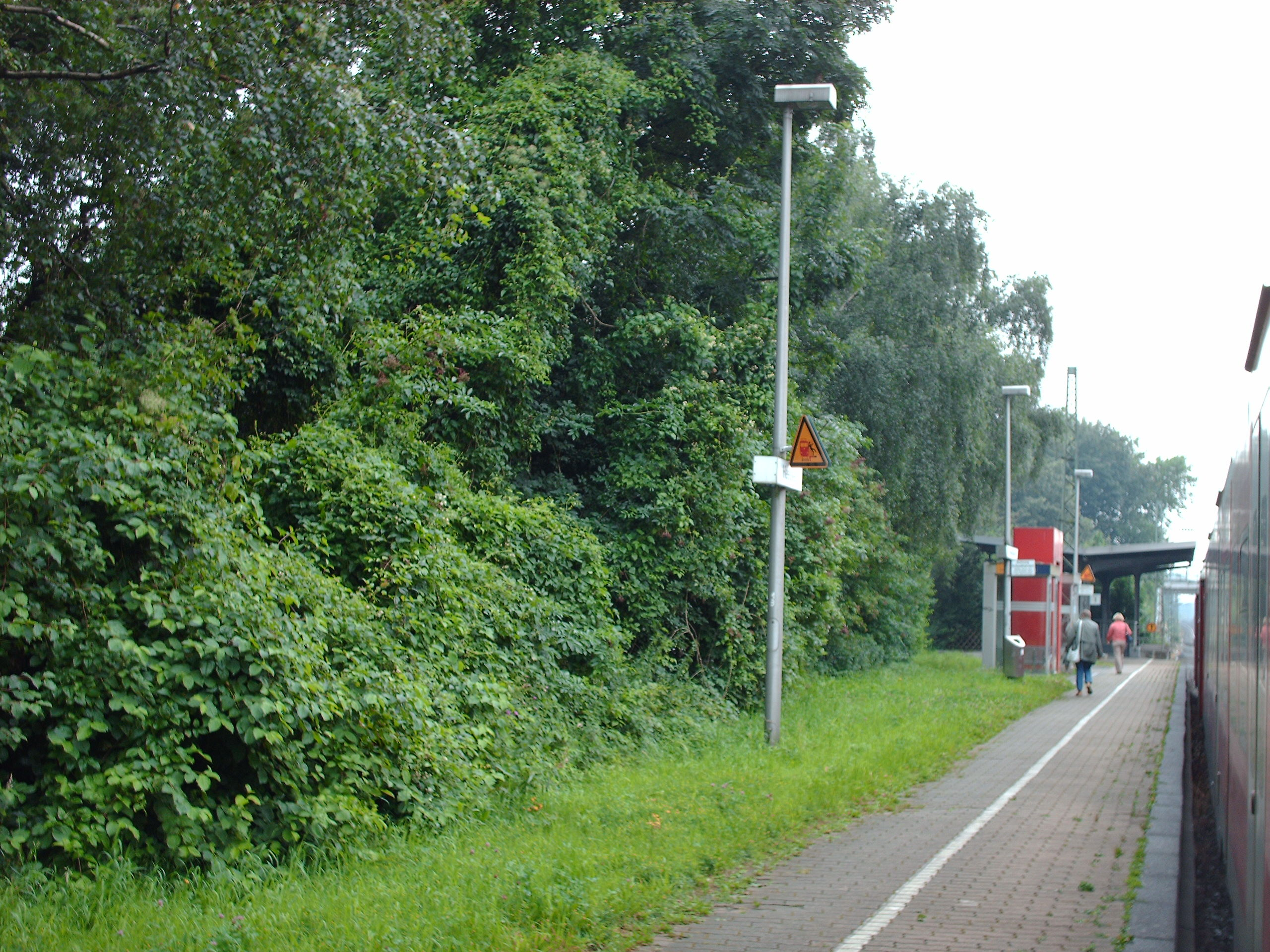

General information
- Location: Kleine Amtsstr., Hamm, NRW; Germany
- Coordinates: 51°42′32″N 7°49′54″E
- Owner: Deutsche Bahn
- Operator: DB Netz; DB Station&Service
- Line: Hamm–Minden
- Platforms: 2

Construction
- Accessible: Yes

Other information
- Station code: 2621
- DS100 code: EHE
- Category: 6
- Fare zone: Westfalentarif: 42106
- Website: www.bahnhof.de

History
- Opened: 1 June 1891

Services
Preceding station	National Express Germany	Following station
Hamm (Westfalen) towards Cologne/Bonn Airport	RE 6 (Rhein-Weser-Express)	Ahlen (Westfalen) towards Minden
Preceding station		Following station
Hamm (Westfalen) towards Münster Hbf	RB 69	Ahlen (Westfalen) towards Bielefeld Hbf
Location

Hamm-Heessen station is a passenger station in Heessen, a suburb of the Westphalian city of Hamm in the German state of North Rhine-Westphalia. It lies on the Hamm–Minden railway, one of the most heavily trafficked lines in Germany. It has an hourly Regional-Express service, the Rhein-Weser-Express (RE 6) on the Düsseldorf–Dortmund–Bielefeld–Minden route as well as an hourly Regionalbahn service, the Ems-Börde-Bahn (RB 69) on the Münster)–Hamm–Bielefeld route, so there is a service about every half an hour. Both lines were previously operated by DB Regio NRW. In December 2008, eurobahn, based in Hamm, took over the operation of RB 69.

In 2009, about €600,000 were allocated for the rehabilitation of the station.

== Services ==
In passenger transport the station is served by several Regional-Express and Regionalbahn services:

Line	Name	Route	Frequency	Operator
RE 6	Rhein-Weser-Express	Minden – Bielefeld – Hamm-Heessen – Hamm (Westf) – Dortmund – Essen – Duisburg – Düsseldorf – Neuss – Cologne – Cologne/Bonn Airport	60 min	National Express Germany
RB 69	Ems-Börde-Bahn	Bielefeld – Hamm-Heessen – Hamm – Münster (Westf)	60 min	eurobahn
See also List of regional rail lines in North Rhine-Westphalia
