= Ahlen (Westfalen) station =

Railway station in Ahlen, Germany

Ahlen (Westf)
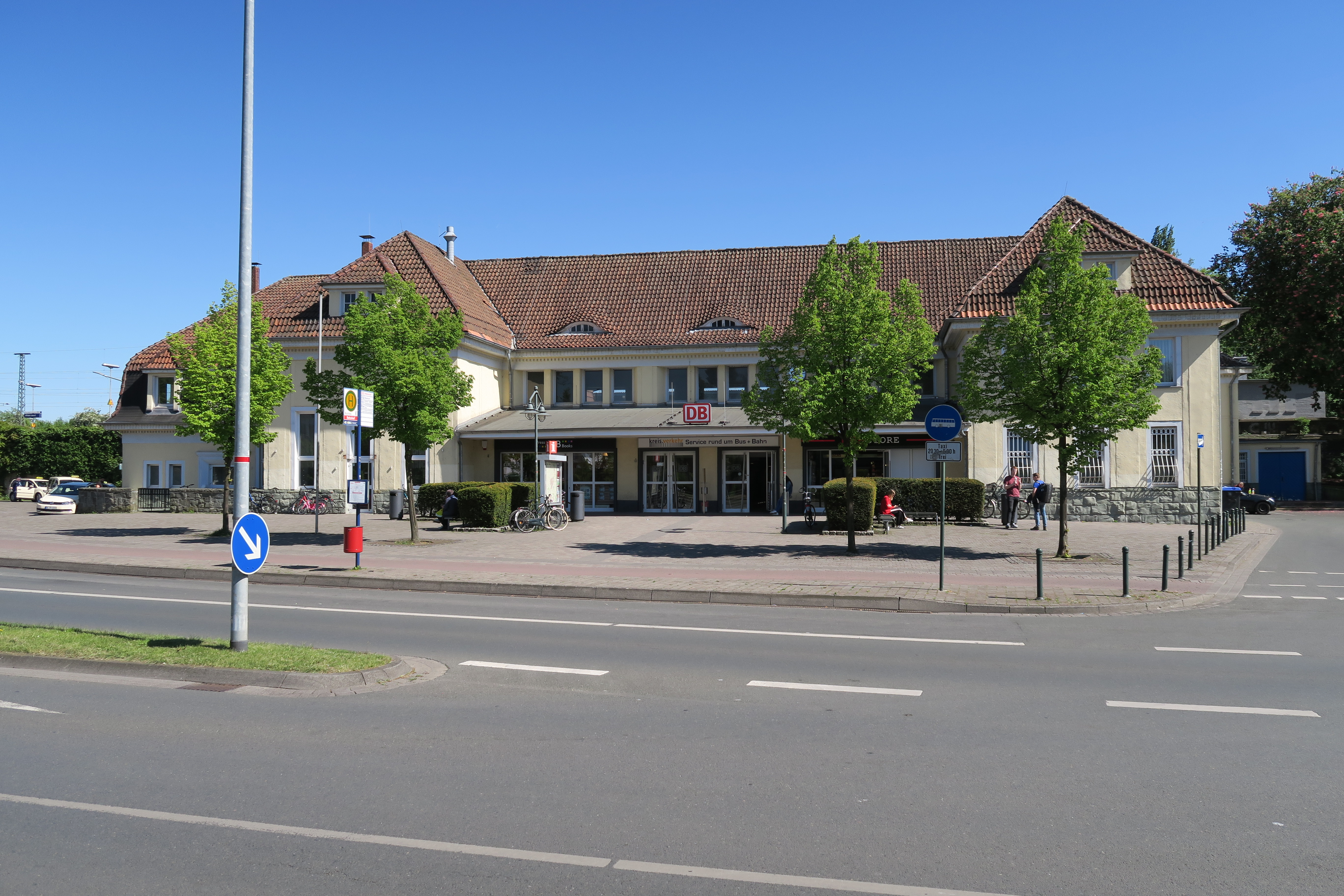
- Ahlen station

General information
- Location: Bahnhofstr. 1b, Ahlen, NRW; Germany
- Coordinates: 51°45′42″N 7°53′42″E
- Line: Hamm–Minden (KBS 400)
- Platforms: 3

Construction
- Accessible: Yes

Other information
- Station code: 23
- DS100 code: EAHL
- IBNR: 8000441
- Category: 4
- Fare zone: Westfalentarif: 53311
- Website: www.bahnhof.de

History
- Opened: 15 October 1847 (station); 1848 (original entrance building); 1916 (new entrance building)

Services
Preceding station	National Express Germany	Following station
Heessen towards Cologne/Bonn Airport	RE 6 (Rhein-Weser-Express)	Neubeckum towards Minden
Preceding station		Following station
Heessen towards Münster Hbf	RB 69	Neubeckum towards Bielefeld Hbf
Location

Ahlen (Westfalen) station—abbreviated to Ahlen (Westf)—serves the town of Ahlen in the German state of North Rhine-Westphalia. It is situated on the electrified, four-track Hamm–Minden railway, which connects the Ruhr region to Hanover. It was originally part of the network of the former Cologne-Minden Railway Company and is now part of the Deutsche Bahn network.

== History ==
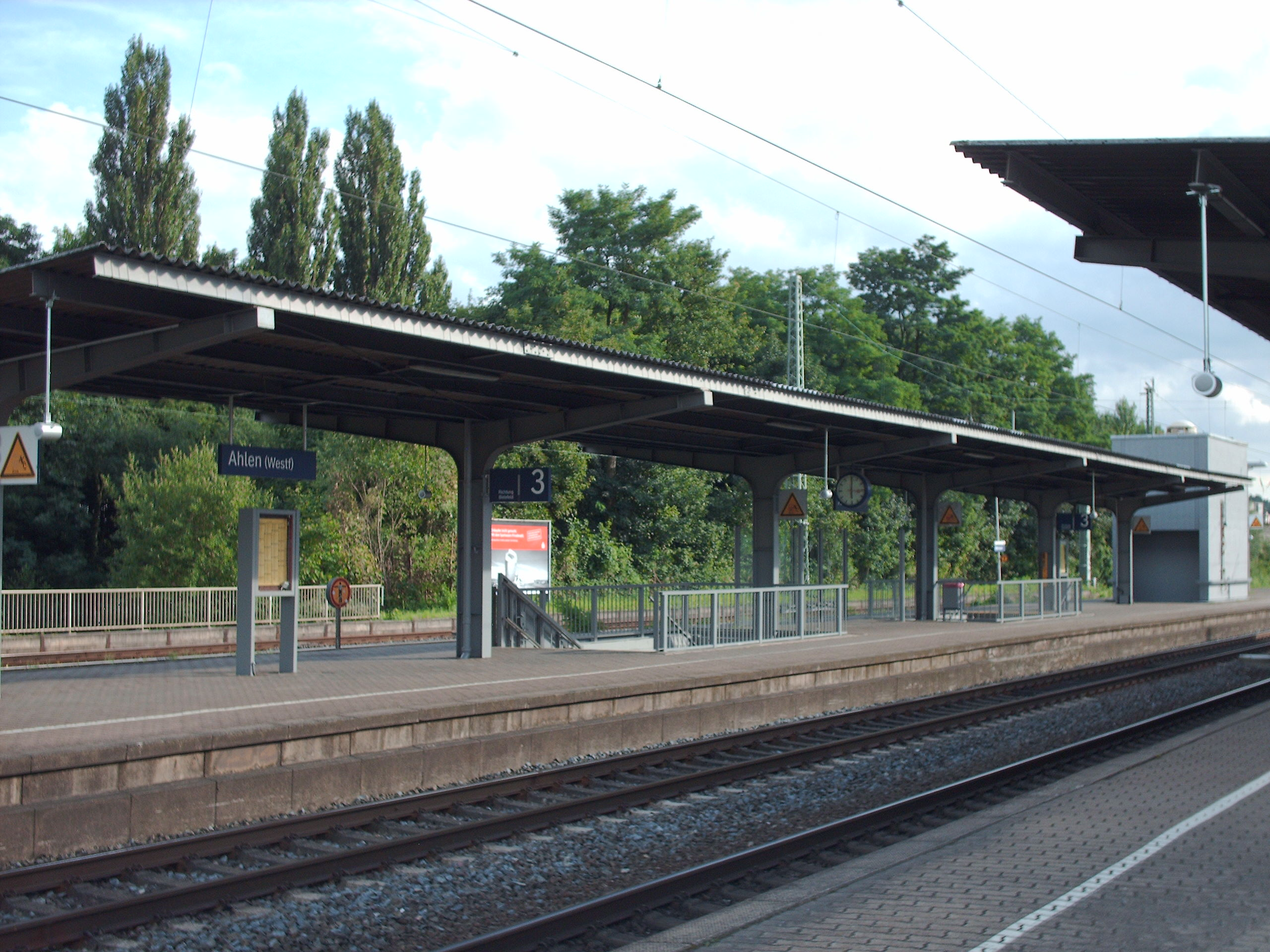
Platforms in Ahlen station

The station was opened on 15 Ahlen October 1847 during the construction of the trunk line of the Cologne-Minden Railway Company (German: Cöln-Mindener Eisenbahn-Gesellschaft). The first station building, built in 1848, was demolished during the First World War, because at this point the line, which had previously run at ground level, was placed on an embankment. The new station building, which is still in use, opened in 1916.

== Current significance ==
The station is a classed as a category 4 station. It is connected by services every half-hour to Bielefeld, Hamm (Westf) and Gütersloh, which each provide further connections under North Rhine-Westphalia’s integrated timetable.

Line	Name	Route	Frequency	Operator
RE 6	Rhein-Weser-Express	Minden – Bielefeld – Ahlen – Hamm (Westf) – Dortmund – Essen – Duisburg – Düsseldorf – Neuss – Cologne – Cologne/Bonn Airport	60 min	National Express
RB 69	Ems-Börde-Bahn	Bielefeld – Ahlen – Hamm – Münster (Westf)	60 min	eurobahn
See also List of regional rail lines in North Rhine-Westphalia

The station has a travel centre, which since 2007 has been operated by a private travel agency. There is also a bookstore with a kiosk operation and a bakery. For the purchase of tickets outside of business hours ticket machines are available at the travel centre for long-distance and local services.

The stairways to the platforms are equipped on one side with stairlifts for wheelchair access.

== Links from the station ==
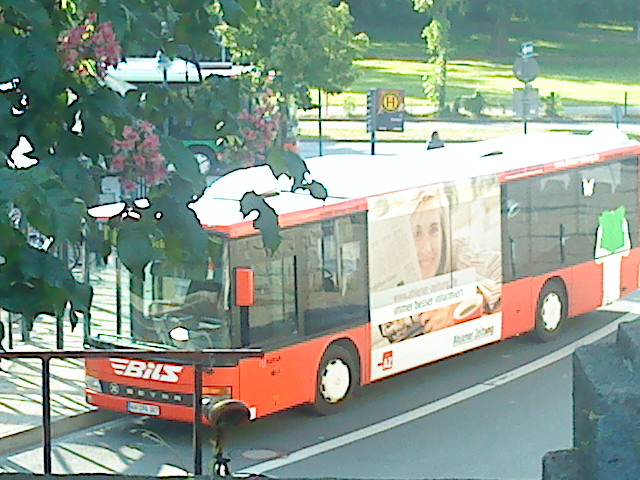
Bus on line C6 at Ahlen station

Next to the station is the town’s central bus station. From here city bus lines run to the urban area of Ahlen. Regional bus services run to neighbouring cities. The city buses are operated by Regionalverkehr Münsterland (Regional transport of Münsterland) and the city of Ahlen.

== Park and Ride ==
Behind the station building is a parking area with parking spaces for park-and-ride and "park-and-rail" (for longer journeys than commuting). At the central bus station there are bicycle stands.
