= Ahlen Water Tower =

Water tower in Ahlen, Germany

Coordinates: 51.741°N 7.906°E

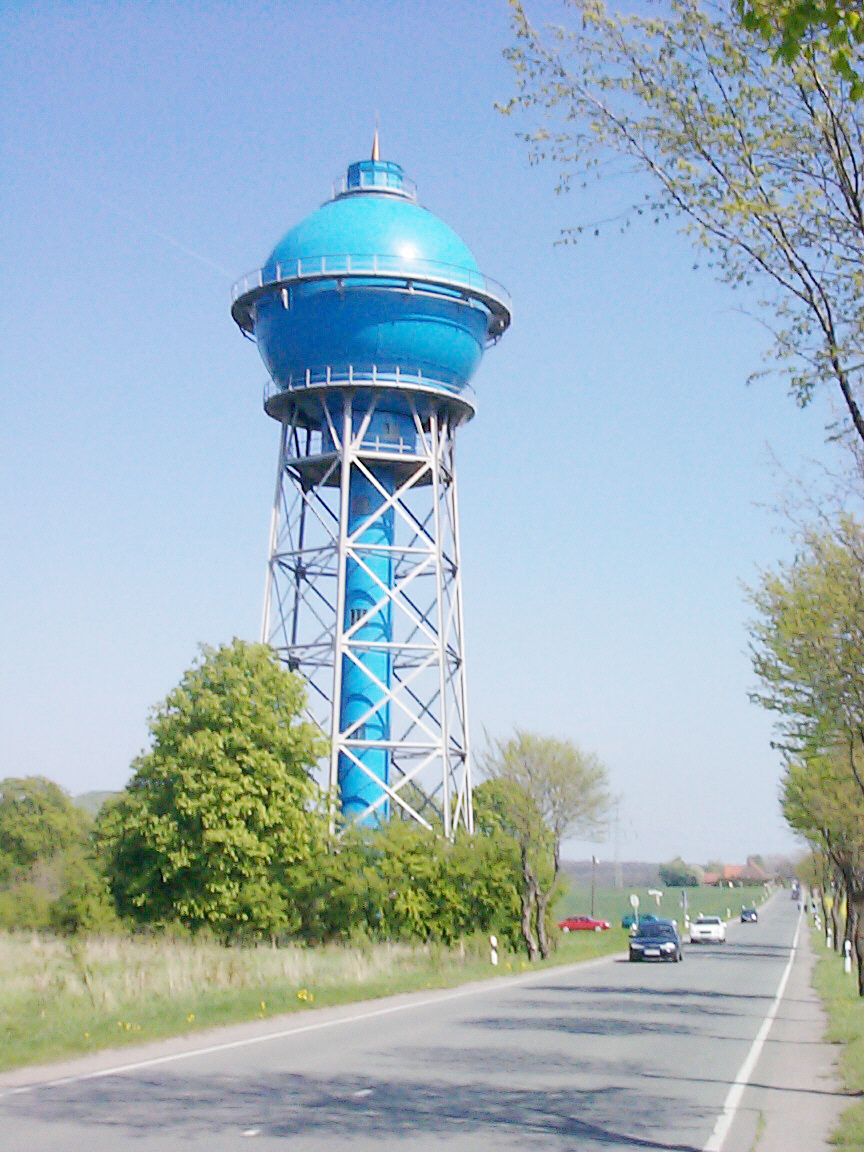
Ahlen water tower

The Ahlen water tower is an industrial monument and landmark in the Ahlen, Germany.

The spherical water tank is 44 metres (144 ft) high and has a capacity of 1,000 cubic metres (35,000 cu ft). From 1915 to 1917, the water tower served as the sole water supply for the Westphalia mine and the miners colony built in 1892 by Gelsenwasser AG.

Today the distinctive blue water tower is monument and is a historical example of the early development of riveting at the beginning of the 20th century.
