= Hans Blomberg =

German radio host (born 1977)

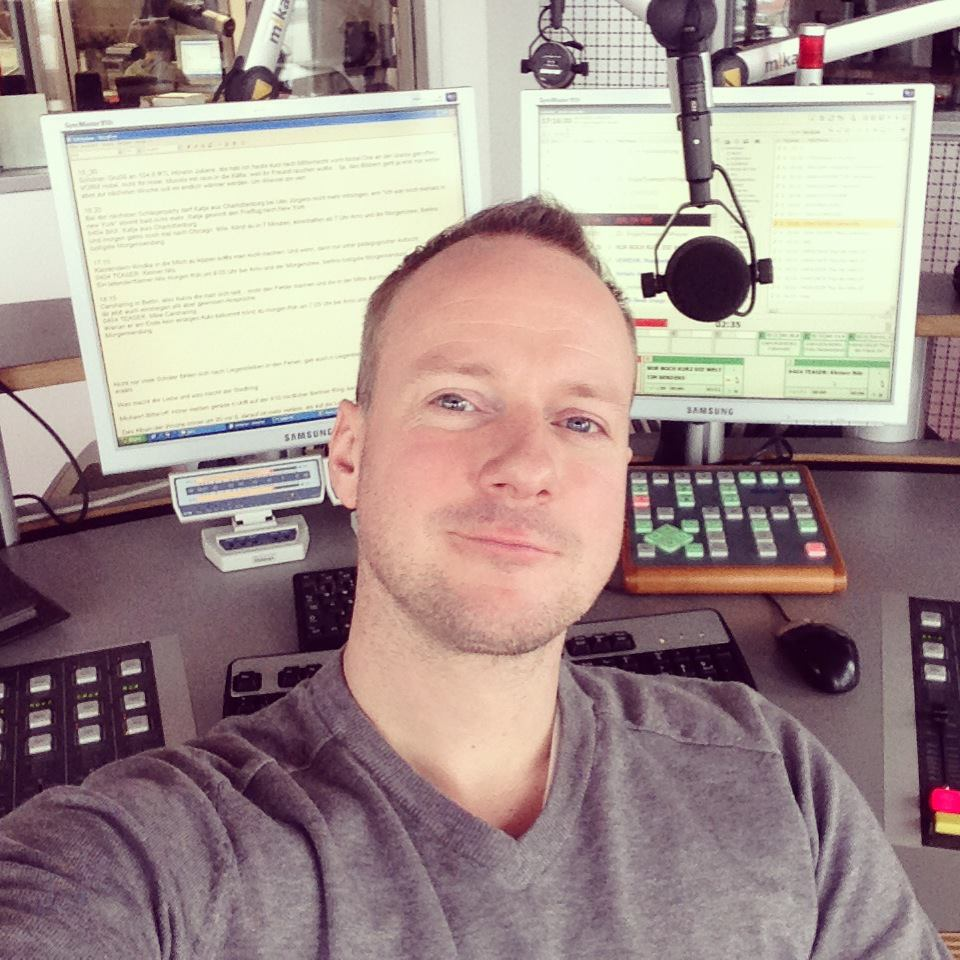
Hans Blomberg in the 104.6 RTL Studio in 2013

Hans Kristian Blomberg (born February 24, 1977, in Hamm-Heessen) is a German radio host.

== Career ==
Hans Blomberg started his radio career at the local radio station Radio Lippe Welle Hamm, where he hosted a weekly show when he was 17 years old.

After finishing high school in Ahlen, Blomberg began as a volunteer in 1997 at the Lower Saxon radio station Radio ffn in Hannover and there hosted the Hans Blomberg Show in the afternoon from 1997 until 2002. Starting in 2002, he broadcast as Morgenhans with bigFM, and since 2007 under his real name.

From 2011 until December 2012, Blomberg additionally hosted at 98.8 KISS FM Berlin on Saturday mornings. At the beginning of January 2013, he moved to Berlin's 104.6 RTL in order to host again under his own name (Hans Blomberg Show), broadcasting on Sunday afternoons. In addition, he is on air throughout the week during the afternoon or evening. The Hans Blomberg Show additionally broadcasts Saturdays on 89.0 RTL (since May 4, 2013) for Lower Saxony, Saxony-Anhalt, and Thuringia and on Planet Radio (since November 23, 2013) for Hesse. Additionally in Hesse, the phone comedy Hans Hart Geweckt (English: Hans wakes up severely) airs from Monday to Friday.

== Television ==
- 2007 & 2009: Bundesvision Song Contest

He has had further television appearances, such as in mieten, kaufen, wohnen (English: rent, buy, live) in 2010 and 2011, Frauentausch (English: Wife Swap) in 2007, and Lenßen – Der Film in 2011.

== Controversies ==
In 2007 at the ProSieben live broadcast of the Bundesvision Song Contest, Blomberg read the score for Rhineland-Palatinate from a note card that said “Raab ist doof” (English: “Raab is stupid”) on the back.

Blomberg caused another scandal at the 2009 Bundesvision Song Contest when he grabbed the breast of his colleague Susanka Bersin at the scoring for Baden-Württemberg, whereupon she slapped him. In a newspaper interview, Blomberg commented about the incident, saying that the real scandal had been the slap and not his grabbing of the breast. Blomberg apologized afterwards on his radio show and also to Bersin personally.

== Stage ==
In 2007, Blomberg toured through Germany together with his partner Olivia Jones. In the reading "Sie nannten mich Tittenmonster“ (English: “They Called Me Tits Monster”), the two read letters of the last 40 years to Bravo scout Dr. Sommer. In 2008, Blomberg tried stand-up comedy on the stage for the first time, in venues such as “Kleinen Wohnzimmer Theater Köln” (English: “Cologne Small Living Room Theater”).
