= Jan Kemper =

German scientist (born 1980)

Jan Kemper (born 14 March 1980 in Wuerselen, North Rhine-Westphalia) is a German manager and scientist. He has been CFO of ProSiebenSat.1 Media SE since June 2017 and has also headed the group's commerce segment (NuCom Group) since February 2018.

== Academic career ==
After graduating from the Anne-Frank secondary school and performing community service at the Viktor-Frankl school in Aachen he received a degree in Business Administration from WHU – Otto Beisheim School of Management in 2004, and a Master of International Business from KEDGE Business School.

In 2008, he started researching international projects in cooperation with RWTH Aachen, Stanford University and Tongji University on international management, marketing and entrepreneurial finance. During this time, Kemper headed the start-up centre at RWTH Aachen University. In 2010 he received his doctoral degree Dr. rer. pol., followed by national and international teaching courses as lecturer. Since 2013, he has been an assistant professor at the RWTH Aachen University at the chair of Economics for Engineers and Natural Scientists of Prof. Dr. Malte Brettel with research focus on entrepreneurship, eCommerce, financing and intercultural management.

== Career ==
After completing his studies, Kemper began his professional career as an investment banker with positions at Credit Suisse and Morgan Stanley in Germany, England and Saudi Arabia.

Following his doctorate, Kemper worked at the online retailer Zalando SE in Berlin as CFO/Senior Vice President Finance and also headed the Indirect Purchasing, Internal IT and Real Estate departments. In 2014, he was involved in the firms successful IPO During his time at Zalando SE, he was responsible for negotiating venture capital rounds, debt financing, company acquisitions and financial investments.

The Supervisory Board of the Munich-based media group ProSiebenSat.1 Media SE appointed him CFO of the company in 2017. His greatest success so far was the negotiation with General Atlantic about the 25.1% stake of the financial investor in the subsidiary NuCom Group.

On January 25, 2021 he was appointed CFO of the German neobank N26.

== Selected peer-reviewed articles ==
- Seeger, M. K., Kemper, J., Brettel, M. How Information Processing and Mobile Channel Choice Influence Product Returns: An Empirical Analysis. In Psychology & Marketing, 36 (3), 2019, p. 198-213.
- Kemper, J. Comparing Consumer Segmentation Bases Towards Brand Purchase And Online Marketing Responsiveness. In Journal of Advertising Research, 2018.
- Grüschow, R. M., Kemper, J., Brettel, M. How do different payment methods deliver cost and credit efficiency in electronic commerce? In Electronic Commerce Research and Applications, 18, 2016, p. 27-36.
- Kemper, J., Schilke, O., Brettel, M. Social Capital as a Microlevel Origin of Organizational Capabilities. In Journal of Product Innovation Management, 30 (3), 2013, p. 589-603.
- Kemper, J., Schilke, O., Reimann, M., Wang, X, Brettel, M. Competition-motivated corporate social responsibility. In Journal of Business Research, 66, 2013, p. 1954-1963.
- Kemper, J., Engelen, A., Brettel, M. How Top Management's Social Capital Fosters the Development of Marketing Capabilities: A Cross-Cultural Comparison. In Journal of International Marketing, 19 (3), 2013, p. 87-112.

== Awards ==
- 2012: Publication Award of the Faculty of Economic Sciences
- 2012: Borchers badge
- 2011: M. Wayne Delozier Best Conference Paper Award

== Miscellaneous ==
Kemper is an enthusiastic triathlete and regularly participates in the Ironman.
