= Eberhard Brünen =

German politician (1906–1980)

Member of the Bundestag
- In office 7 September 1949 – 7 September 1953
- In office 17 October 1961 – 22 September 1972

Personal details
- Born: 8 August 1906 Duisburg, German Empire
- Died: 30 October 1980 (aged 74) Duisburg, West Germany
- Party: SPD

Eberhard Brünen (8 August 1906 – 30 October 1980) was a German politician of the Social Democratic Party (SPD) and former member of the German Bundestag.

== Life ==
In 1945 Brünen rejoined the SPD, was District Administrator in Dinslaken and from 1946 to 1969 City Councillor in Duisburg, and from 1947 to 1950 and from 1954 to 1961 he was a member of the North Rhine-Westphalia Landtag. He was a member of the German Bundestag from 1949 to 1953 and again from 1961 to 1972. He was always directly elected in the constituency of Duisburg I.

== Literature ==
Herbst, Ludolf; Jahn, Bruno (2002). Vierhaus, Rudolf (ed.). Biographisches Handbuch der Mitglieder des Deutschen Bundestages. 1949–2002 [Biographical Handbook of the Members of the German Bundestag. 1949–2002] (in German). München: De Gruyter - De Gruyter Saur. p. 1715. ISBN 978-3-11-184511-1.
