= Andreas Dombret =

German-American banker

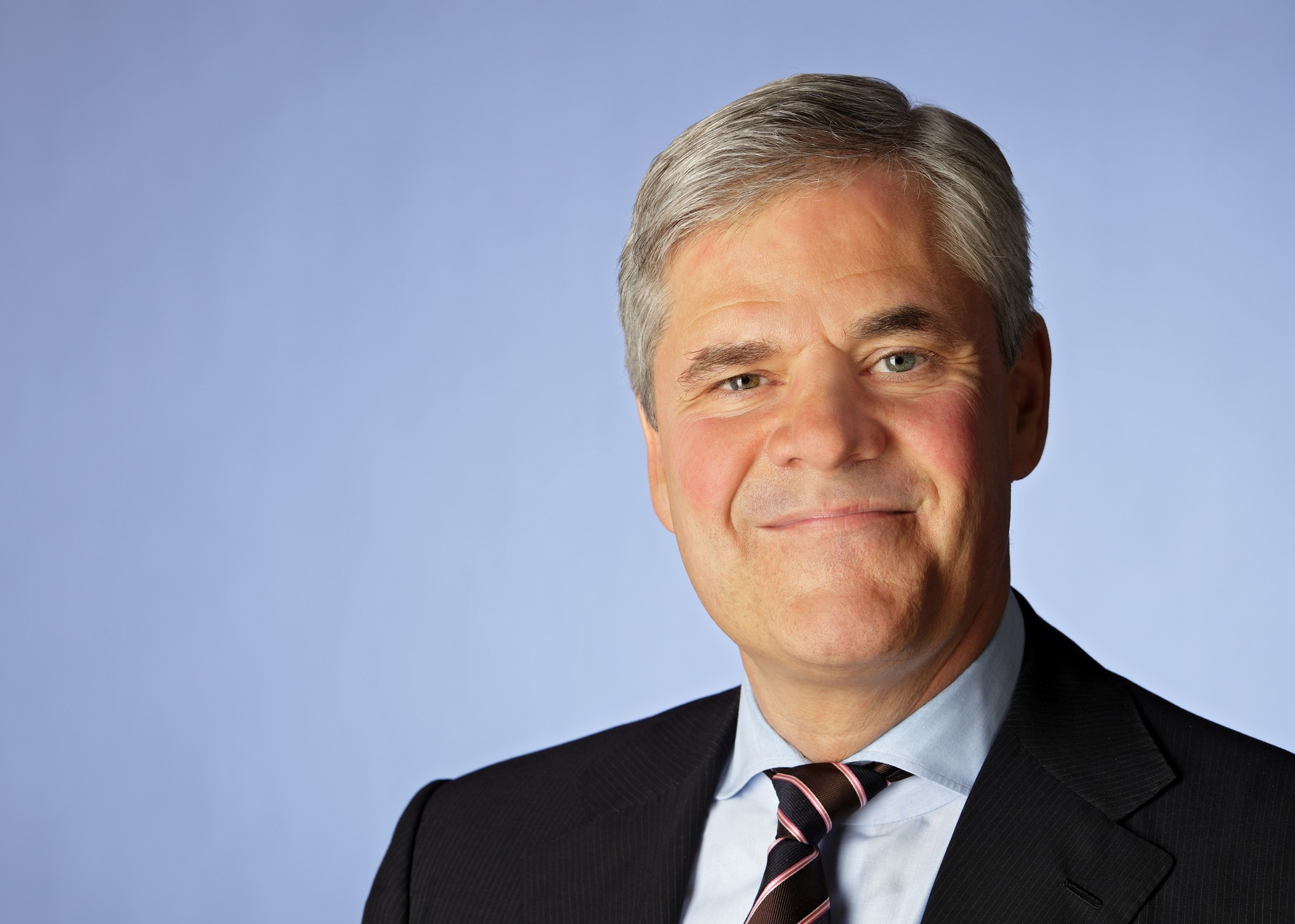
- Andreas Dombret, 2011
- Born: 16 January 1960 (age 66); United States
- Occupation: banker

Andreas Raymond Dombret (born January 16, 1960, in the United States) is a German-American banker who served as member of the executive board of the Deutsche Bundesbank from 2010 until 2018. In that capacity, he held responsibility for Banking and Financial Supervision, Risk Controlling and the Bundesbank's Representative Offices abroad.

Earlier in his career, Dombret was the vice-chairman of Bank of America Global Investment Banking in Europe, the Middle East and Africa as well as head of the German, Austrian and Swiss branches. He holds dual German and American citizenship.

== Early life and education ==
Dombret completed his MBA at Westfälische Wilhelms University Münster and earned his doctorate at Friedrich-Alexander University Erlangen-Nürnberg, where he wrote his dissertation on Takeover Premiums in M&A Transactions. Dombret is honorary professor at the European Business School in Oestrich-Winkel where he currently acts as visiting lecturer for the MBA graduate program in the courses Investment Banking and Capital Markets.

== Career ==
=== Career in the private sector ===
Dombret began his career at the headquarters of Deutsche Bank. Prior to joining Bank of America, Dombret was a managing director and the co-head of Rothschild Germany. Prior to this, he spent 10 years with JP Morgan in London and in Frankfurt, and was a managing director in the Investment Banking Division covering German clients.

From 2005 to 2009, Dombret served as vice chairman of Bank of America Global Investment Banking in Europe, the Middle East and Africa as well as head of the German, Austrian and Swiss branches.

=== Deutsche Bundesbank, 2010–2018 ===
From 2010 until 2018, Dombret was a member of the executive board of the Deutsche Bundesbank, responsible for Banking Supervision, Risk Control, Economic Education, University of Applied Sciences and Technical Central Bank Cooperation and the Bundesbank's representatives abroad. In this capacity, he was also a member of the Basel Committee on Banking Supervision, the ECB Supervisory Board as well as the German Financial Stability Committee.

=== Later career ===
After retiring from the board of the German central bank, Dombret continued to serve on the board of Basel-based Bank for International Settlements until the end of 2018 and subsequently assumed a portfolio of advisory mandates. Among them are consultancy firm Oliver Wyman, Sumitomo Mitsui Banking Corporation (SMBC) and London-headquartered Equity Research firm Autonomous. In addition, he advises US Investment House Houlihan Lokey as Independent Chairman DACH and German Fintech Deposit Solutions, speaks at conferences worldwide and teaches as Adjunct Senior Research Scholar at the Faculty of International & Public Affairs of Columbia University in New York City.

== Other activities ==
=== Government agencies ===
- Center for Financial Studies, member of the board of trustees/advisory board

=== Corporate boards ===
- N26, chair of the supervisory board (since 2025)

=== Non-profit organizations ===
- Economics Department at the University of Frankfurt, member of the board of trustees/advisory board
- University of Münster, member of the board of trustees
- Schirn Kunsthalle Frankfurt, member of the board of trustees
- Städel, member of the board of trustees/advisory board
- Austrian Society for Bank Research, member of the board of trustees
- Atlantik-Brücke, treasurer
- European School for Management and Technology (ESMT), member of the board of directors
- Hessische Kulturstiftung, Member of the Board of Trustees
- Salzburg Global Seminar, member of the board of directors
- International Centre for Monetary and Banking Studies (ICMB)/Geneva, member of the board
- Zeitschrift für das gesamte Kreditwesen, co-editor
- The International Economy, member of the advisory board of editors
- Central Banking , member of the advisory board

== Awards ==
In 2007, Dombret was awarded the Cross of Merit of the Federal Republic of Germany (Bundesverdienstkreuz am Bande). In 2012, Dombret was honoured with the Austrian Cross of Honour for Science and Art. In 2013, he was awarded with the Hessian Order of Merit as well as with the Plaque of Honour of Frankfurt am Main. In 2016, Dombret was awarded the Weilburgpreis of the City of Baden, Austria, for his support of art and culture as well as the Japanese Order of the Rising Sun, Gold Rays with Neck Ribbon. In 2016, he was appointed as an honorary officer of the Order of the British Empire (OBE) for services to Anglo German economic and trade relations. In 2017, he obtained the silver cross of the Bundesland Niederösterreich (Lower Austria) for his support the Arnulf Rainer museum in Baden. In 2018, he was awarded the Chevalier de l'Ordre national du mérite of the French Republic.

== Donations ==
Dombret sponsors the Andreas Dombret – Center for Students Initiatives (CSI) at the Westfälische Wilhelms University (WWU) in Münster and a graduation prize for one dissertation that best combines science and practice every year. For his merits for the university, Andreas Dombret was awarded with the WWU university medal in 2009. For his grant to the Arnulf Rainer museum in Baden (near Vienna) he was awarded with the "Grosse silberne Stadtwappen der Stadt Baden bei Wien" in January 2010.

== Publications ==
- Dombret, A.R. (ed) (2017): "Bankenaufsicht im Dialog 2017", Schriftenreihe zum Bundesbank Symposium Vol. 3, Frankfurt am Main.
- Dombret, A..R.; Gündüz, Yalin; Rocholl, Jörg (2017): Will German Banks earn their cost of capital? In: Discussion Paper No 01/2017, Deutsche Bundesbank, Frankfurt.
- Dombret, A.R.(2017): European Financial Integration: Monetary Union, Banking Union, Capital Markets Union. In: Francioni, Reto / Schwartz, Robert A. (eds.): Equity Markets in Transition. Springer, Cham, S. 565–573
- Dombret, A.R. (ed) (2016): "Bankenaufsicht im Dialog 2016", Schriftenreihe zum Bundesbank Symposium Vol. 2, Frankfurt am Main.
- Dombret, A.R. (2016): Blase oder nicht – wo steht der deutsche Wohnimmobilienmarkt? In: ifo Schnelldienst 16/2016, 69. Jg., S. 20–25
- Dombret, A.R. (2016): Baustelle europäische Bankenunion – gemeinsame Aufsicht, gemeinsame Abwicklung, gemeinsame Einlagensicherung? In: Zeitschrift für das gesamte Kreditwesen, 69. Jg., Nr. 13, S. 632 ff.
- Dombret, A.R. (ed) (2015): "Bankenaufsicht im Dialog 2015", Schriftenreihe zum Bundesbank Symposium, Frankfurt am Main.
- Dombret, A.R. (2013): "Criteria for Financial Stability – The European View", in Dombret, A.R./Lucius, O.(Hg.): "Stability of the Financial System – Illusion or Feasible Concept?", Cheltenham, UK und Northampton, USA, 2013.
- Dombret, A.R. (2013): "Solving the Too-Big-To-Fail-Problem for Financial Institutions", in: Dombret, A.R./Kenadjian, P. (Hg.): "The Bank Recovery and Resolution Directive – Europe's Solution for 'Too Big To Fail'?", Berlin und Boston, 2013.
