= Petra Weis =

German politician

Petra Weis (born 28 December 1957) is a German politician from the Social Democratic Party. She was Member of the German Bundestag for the Duisburg I constituency from 2002 to 2009.
