= Axos Financial =

American Bank holding company

Axos Financial, Inc.
- Company type: Public
- Traded as: NYSE: AX; S&P 600 component Russell 2000 component
- Industry: Financial services
- Founded: July 6, 1999; 26 years ago
- Headquarters: Las Vegas, Nevada
- Key people: Gregory Garrabrants, President & CEO; Andrew J. Micheletti, CFO
- Products: Online banking
- Net income: ▼$432 million (FY 2025)
- Total assets: ▲$24.783 billion (FY 2025)
- Total equity: ▲$2.680 billion (FY 2025)
- Owner: Gregory Garrabrants (2.89%)
- Number of employees: 1,989 (2025)
- Website: investors.axosfinancial.com/corporate-profile/default.aspx

Axos Financial, Inc. is an American bank holding company based in Las Vegas, Nevada, and is the parent of Axos Bank, a direct bank on the list of largest banks in the United States. It also offers registered investment adviser services and an electronic trading platform.

== History ==
Axos was founded in 1999 as BofI Holding, Inc., by Jerry Englert, the founder of Bank of Del Mar, and Gary Lewis Evans, president of La Jolla Bank, with $14 million of startup capital. It began operations as Bank of Internet on July 4, 2000. The start date of July 4 was purposely chosen because it showed that the bank would be open on a day that other banks were closed due to Independence Day and because the internet bank represented "Independence from traditional banking".

BofI became a public company via an initial public offering on March 15, 2005. It offered 3,052,745 shares of common stock at a price of $11.50 per share.

Gregory Garrabrants, previously senior vice president at IndyMac Bancorp, was appointed CEO in October 2007. In 2018, Garrabrants earned $34.5 million, making him the highest paid bank CEO of that year.

On October 1, 2018, BofI Holding re-branded as Axos Financial, and switched its stock exchange listing from NASDAQ to the NYSE. Bank of Internet was rebranded as Axos Bank.

=== Acquisitions ===
#	Date	Assets	Ref(s).
1	September 2013	$173 million in deposits from Principal Bank	
2	September 2015	Bank unit of H&R Block	
3	March 2016	$140 million of equipment leases from Pacific Western Equipment Finance	
4	November 2018	$3 billion in deposits and 40,000 customers from Nationwide Bank	
5	January 2019	COR Clearing LLC (rebranded as Axos Clearing)	
6	March 2019	WiseBanyan (rebranded as Axos Invest)	
7	March 2019	$175 million in deposits from MWABank	
8	August 2021	E*TRADE Advisor Services (rebranded as Axos Advisor Services)	
9	August 2023	Marine finance business of Bank of Clarke	
10	December 2023	Two loans from the FDIC previously owned by Signature Bank (unpaid principal balance of $1.253 billion; cost of 63% of par value)	
11	September 2025	Verdant Commercial Capital, an equipment leasing firm; price was $43.5 million	

== Lending practices ==
The bank has made larger loans to wealthy individuals that other banks have turned down, albeit at higher interest rates.

The company made a total of $400 million in loans to Donald Trump and is one of his largest lenders. In March 2022, Axos funded a $100 million mortgage loan secured by Trump Tower. The company also financed Trump National Doral Miami.

As of June 30, 2025, approximately 28.7% of the company's loans were secured by properties in Southern California, 7.1% were secured by properties in Northern California, 28.2% were secured by properties in New York, 12.0% were secured by properties in Florida, and 5.5% were secured by properties in Texas.
