= Lamya Kaddor =

German scholar of Islamic studies

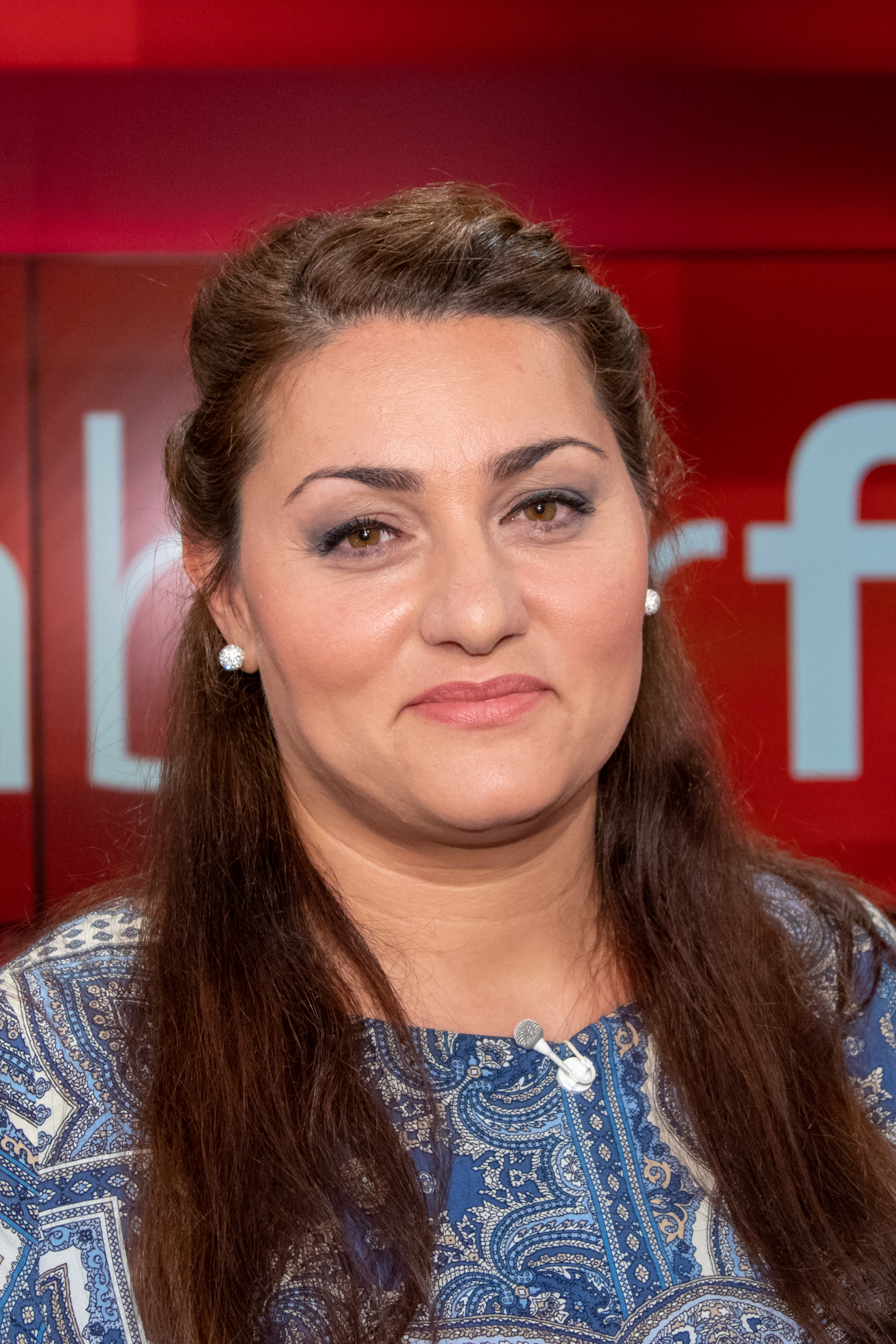

Member of the Bundestag
- Incumbent
- Assumed office 2021
- Constituency: North Rhine-Westphalia

Personal details
- Born: 11 June 1978 (age 48) Ahlen, West Germany
- Party: Greens

Lamya Kaddor (born 11 June 1978 in Ahlen) is a German writer and scholar of Islamic studies of Syrian ancestry who has been serving as a member of the German Bundestag since the 2021 elections. She is the founder and chairwoman of the Liberal-Islamic Association (LIB e.V.) and is known for introducing Islamic education into German public schools.

== Early life ==
Kaddors arrived in Germany from Syria in 1978.

== Career as teacher ==
Together with Rabeya Müller, Kaddor published the first German Qur'an translation for children and adults: "Der Koran für Kinder und Erwachsene". Furthermore, she is the initiator and editor of the first German school book for Islamic education, called "Saphir".

Especially since 2014, Kaddor has been working on the subject of Salafism and Islamism. Five of her former students volunteered for jihad in Syria, which Kaddor perceived as a personal defeat.

Kaddor taught Islamic education in a secondary school in Dinslaken in North-Rhine-Westphalia.

Together with peace activist Tarek Mohamad, Kaddor organized the Nicht mit uns – or Not with us - protest-march in Cologne in June 2017 to make a stand against acts of terror and violence carried out in the name of Islam.

== Political career ==
In the negotiations to form a so-called traffic light coalition of the Social Democratic Party (SPD), the Green Party and the Free Democratic Party (FDP) following the 2021 German elections, Kaddor was part of her party's delegation in the working group on homeland security, civil rights and consumer protection, co-chaired by Christine Lambrecht, Konstantin von Notz and Wolfgang Kubicki.

In parliament, Kaddor has been serving on the Committee on Internal Affairs since 2021. In this capacity, she is her parliamentary group's rapporteur on relations with the Middle East.

In the negotiations to form a coalition government of the Christian Democratic Union (CDU) and the Green Party under Minister-President of North Rhine-Westphalia Hendrik Wüst following the 2022 state elections, Kaddor was part of her party's delegation in the working group on education.

== Other activities ==
- Federal Agency for Civic Education (BPB), Member of the Board of Trustees (since 2022)
- Memorial to the Murdered Jews of Europe Foundation, Member of the Board of Trustees (since 2022)
- Islamkolleg Deutschland (IKD), Member of the Advisory Board (since 2021)

== Political positions ==
When Hans-Peter Friedrich said at his first news conference as Federal Minister of the Interior in 2011 that "Islam in Germany is not something substantiated by history at any point" and that Islam did not play a major role in German culture, Kaddor responded that "such statements are not only politically and historically wrong, I think they are dangerous".
