= Vrablic =

Vráblic or Vrablic (feminine: Vráblicová) is a Slovak surname. Notable people with the surname include:

- Igor Vrablic (born 1965), Canadian former soccer player
- Rosemary Vrablic (born 1960/61), American banker
