= New York business fraud lawsuit against the Trump Organization =

Civil fraud prosecution against The Trump Organization

New York v. Trump, et al.
- Court: Supreme Court of the State of New York
- Full case name: Case name: People of the State of New York v. Donald J. Trump, Donald Trump Jr., Eric Trump, Ivanka Trump, Allen Weisselberg, Jeffrey McConney, The Donald J. Trump Revocable Trust, The Trump Organization, Inc., Trump Organization LLC, DJT Holdings LLC, DJT Holdings Managing Member, Trump Endeavor 12 LLC, 401 North Wabash Venture LLC, Trump Old Post Office LLC, 40 Wall Street LLC, Seven Springs LLC
- Started: October 2, 2023
- Verdict: Trump and his companies liable to pay $354.8 million of disgorgement of ill-gotten gains for financial fraud
- Citation: 452564/2022

Court membership
- Judge sitting: Arthur F. Engoron

New York v. Trump is a civil investigation and lawsuit by the office of the New York Attorney General alleging that individuals and business entities within the Trump Organization engaged in financial fraud by presenting vastly disparate property values to potential lenders and tax officials, in violation of New York Executive Law § 63(12). The defendants were Donald Trump, five other individuals including three of his children, and ten business entities including some that owned property in New York, Florida, and Chicago. After a trial that took place from October 2023 to January 2024, presiding judge Arthur Engoron ordered the defendants to disgorge a total of US$364 million of ill-gotten gains, among other penalties, but an appeals court in August 2025 voided this penalty.

Attorney General Letitia James began investigating the organization in early 2019, with public litigation beginning in August 2020 to support her subpoenas in the inquiry. In February 2022, Engoron ruled in favor of James's subpoenas, and in April 2022, Donald Trump was found in contempt of court for not complying with them and Trump was fined $110,000.

In September 2022, the Attorney General sued Trump, his three oldest children (Donald Jr., Ivanka, and Eric), former chief financial officer Allen Weisselberg, former controller Jeffrey McConney, and ten related companies. In November 2022, Engoron appointed retired judge Barbara S. Jones to monitor the organization regarding potential future fraud. In 2023, Ivanka was released as a defendant due to an expired statute of limitations.

In September 2023, Engoron issued a summary judgment that Trump and his company had committed fraud for years. The judge ordered the termination of the defendants' state business licenses and the dissolution of pertinent limited liability companies (pending appeal). The trial covered six additional claims by the Attorney General and considered further penalties. In October, a gag order was placed on Trump, forbidding him from publicly disparaging court staff; the judge fined Trump $5,000 and $10,000 for two violations of the order that same month. The defense unsuccessfully sought to dismiss the case, as well as related subpoenas and rulings.

In February 2024, Engoron concluded that the "defendants failed to accept responsibility or to impose internal controls to prevent future recurrences" of having "submitted blatantly false financial data" to "borrow more and at lower rates". Engoron assessed Trump and his companies $354 million of disgorgement of ill-gotten gains (not including interest), while Eric and Donald Jr. were assessed $4 million each, and Weisselberg $1 million. These four and McConney were also banned from leading New York organizations from two to three years; Weisselberg and McConney were also permanently banned from having any financial control in such organizations.

In March 2024, the New York Appellate Division, First Department, lowered the defendants' required bond from $464 million to $175 million, while staying the bans ordered by Engoron. In early April, Trump posted the bond. An appeal hearing was held on September 26. On August 21, 2025, the appeals court upheld Trump's liability but voided the penalty as excessive.

== Background ==
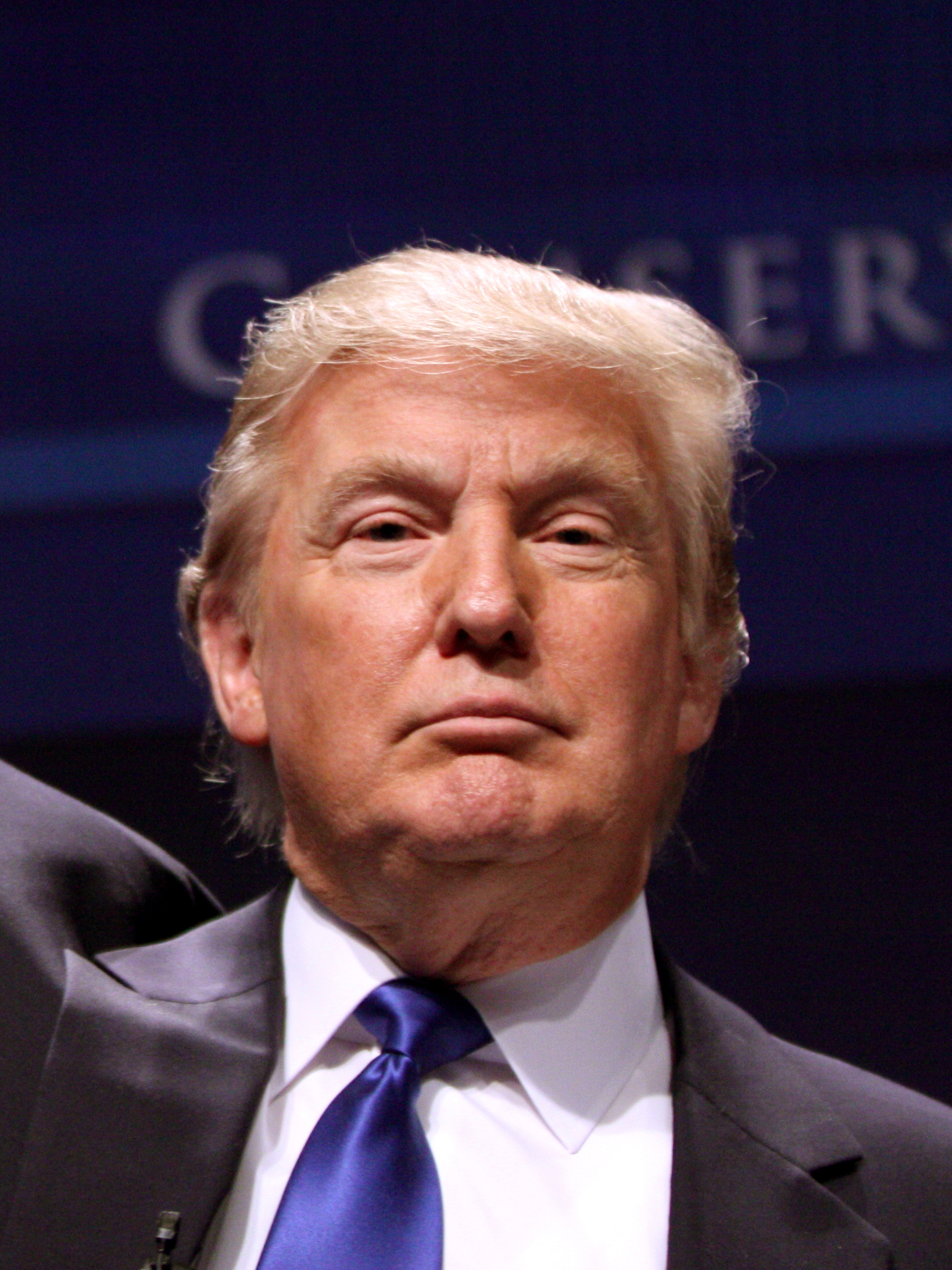
Donald Trump in 2011

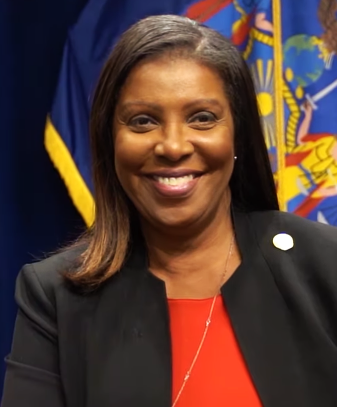
New York Attorney General Letitia James led the inquiry.

In Donald Trump's defamation case against TrumpNation author Timothy L. O'Brien, Trump testified in 2007 that "I think everybody" exaggerates their property values and that he did not do so "beyond reason". He said he would give his opinion to Trump Organization chief financial officer Allen Weisselberg, who "predominately" determined final values, which Trump called "conservative". Regarding one case in which a property increased from $80 million in 2005 to $150 million in 2006, Trump stated, "The property was valued very low, in my opinion, then and it became very—it just has gone up." He was unable to provide a reason for this other than his opinion. Between 2011 and 2015, the Trump Organization presented several properties as being worth millions of dollars—in one case over $500 million—more to potential lenders than to tax officials; this was reported by The Washington Post in November 2021.

In January 2017, ahead of Trump's inauguration, his attorney Sheri Dillon announced that the organization's businesses would be transferred to a trust controlled by Trump's sons Donald Jr. and Eric Trump, as well as Weisselberg.

In February 2019, prompted by U.S. House Representative Alexandria Ocasio-Cortez (D-NY) asking whether Trump had ever presented inflated assets to an insurance company, former Trump personal attorney Michael Cohen testified to Congress that Trump "inflated [the organization's] total assets when it served his purposes, such as trying to be listed amongst the wealthiest people in Forbes, (Note: According to Forbes, Trump admitted inflating his net worth to that publication in 2015, saying it was "good for financing".) and deflated his assets to reduce his real estate taxes." Following Cohen's testimony, in March, the New York State Department of Financial Services issued a subpoena to Aon, the organization's longtime insurance broker.

== Initial investigation and proceedings ==
In March 2019, the office of New York Attorney General (OAG) Letitia James began investigating the organization, the AG having stated during her 2018 campaign that she intended to do so, though she was referring to crimes pertaining to claims he committed fraud to raise rents on tenants as noted in a 2018 NY Times investigation. By December 2019, James's office had subpoenaed the organization for some records which it subsequently failed to provide for at least 21 months.

=== Initial subpoenas and discovery ===
On July 17, 2020, Allen Weisselberg was deposed. He made false statements, denying he had ever been present when Donald Trump described the triplex's size and claiming "we didn't find out about the error [on the 2016 financial statement] until the [May 2017] Forbes article came out". (Nearly four years later, he pleaded guilty to perjury for these two statements.)

In August 2020, James disclosed in a court filing that her office had been conducting a civil investigation of the Trump Organization for asset inflation for 18 months. She asked the court to compel the organization to provide information it had been withholding, including testimony from Eric Trump who had resisted a subpoena and abruptly canceled an interview scheduled for the previous month. In September, Judge Arthur Engoron ordered him to sit for a deposition by October 7; (Note: On September 17, 2020, Eric Trump stated that he wished to provide his deposition after the November election, citing his busy travel schedule and wanting "to avoid the use of his deposition attendance for political purposes".) he was deposed on October 5 and invoked his Fifth Amendment right against self-incrimination over 500 times.

On September 2, 2021, Judge Engoron ordered the organization to submit a report explaining what it was doing to comply with subpoenas from the OAG, one of which dated back to December 2019. If this request was not met by October 15, an electronic discovery firm was to be commissioned to review the company's records. On December 1, James subpoenaed Donald Trump in the civil case, with the intent of deposing him on January 7, 2022. Ivanka and Donald Trump Jr. were issued subpoenas in the matter the same day.

On December 20, 2021, Trump's lawyer Alina Habba filed a lawsuit in federal court against James, alleging that her case against the former president was "guided solely by political animus and a desire to harass, intimidate, and retaliate against a private citizen who she views as a political opponent" and that his civil rights were being violated. The next month, James filed a motion requesting that Trump's suit be dismissed, arguing that he was only trying to block his deposition. In May 2022, U.S. District Court Judge Brenda K. Sannes held a hearing in the matter and dismissed the lawsuit. In June, Trump filed a federal notice of appeal. In August, Habba requested that the U.S. Court of Appeals for the 2nd Circuit revive the lawsuit. In January 2023, Trump's team withdrew the appeal, with Habba asserting that this was done "for strategic purposes". (Note: On January 19, Trump, Habba and her firm were fined nearly $1 million for suing Hillary Clinton for allegedly conspiring to damage Trump politically in the 2016 election via a purported bad-faith investigation of his alleged collusion with Russia; this lawsuit was ruled to be frivolous, "drafted to advance a political narrative", and meant only to "seek revenge". The judge warned that Trump's suit against James also appeared frivolous as one of a number of proceedings demonstrating "a pattern of abuse of the courts" in that it seeks "revenge on political adversaries".)

On January 3, 2022, James and a lawyer for the organization filed a court document naming Ivanka and Donald Trump Jr. as respondents in the civil case. Additionally, the filing noted that the two Trumps and their father had moved to block their subpoenas on the premise that the AG was attempting to sidestep due process to gather evidence against them in the related criminal case. According to a legal expert cited by The New York Times, this is the responsibility of the defendants' lawyers to prove, but while the Trumps could invoke their right against self-incrimination during their testimony, refusal to testify could be cited in the civil case. James argued that the Trumps were using a continued pattern of "delay tactics" to keep her from interviewing them under oath. On January 10, Habba filed a motion seeking a stay of proceedings to allow an injunction against James on the same essential basis as Trump's lawsuit against the AG. At a political rally on January 15, Trump showed a video compilation of James referring to him as an "illegitimate president" and calling attention to his finances; this ended with the text "unhinged liberal" placed over James's face. At another rally two weeks later, Trump said of James and Fulton County, Georgia District Attorney Fani Willis (both of whom are African Americans and were scrutinizing the legality of actions by Trump): "If these radical, vicious, racist prosecutors do anything wrong or illegal, I hope we are going to have in this country the biggest protest we have ever had." (Note: Trump later called Manhattan District Attorney Alvin Bragg, also an African American investigating Trump, racist as well.) On January 31, James filed a motion arguing that her case "presents no emergency requiring the extraordinary relief of a preliminary injunction". She also clarified that her remarks against Trump had been made while campaigning in the 2018 New York AG election, stating, "I pursue cases based on evidence ... the politics stop at my door."

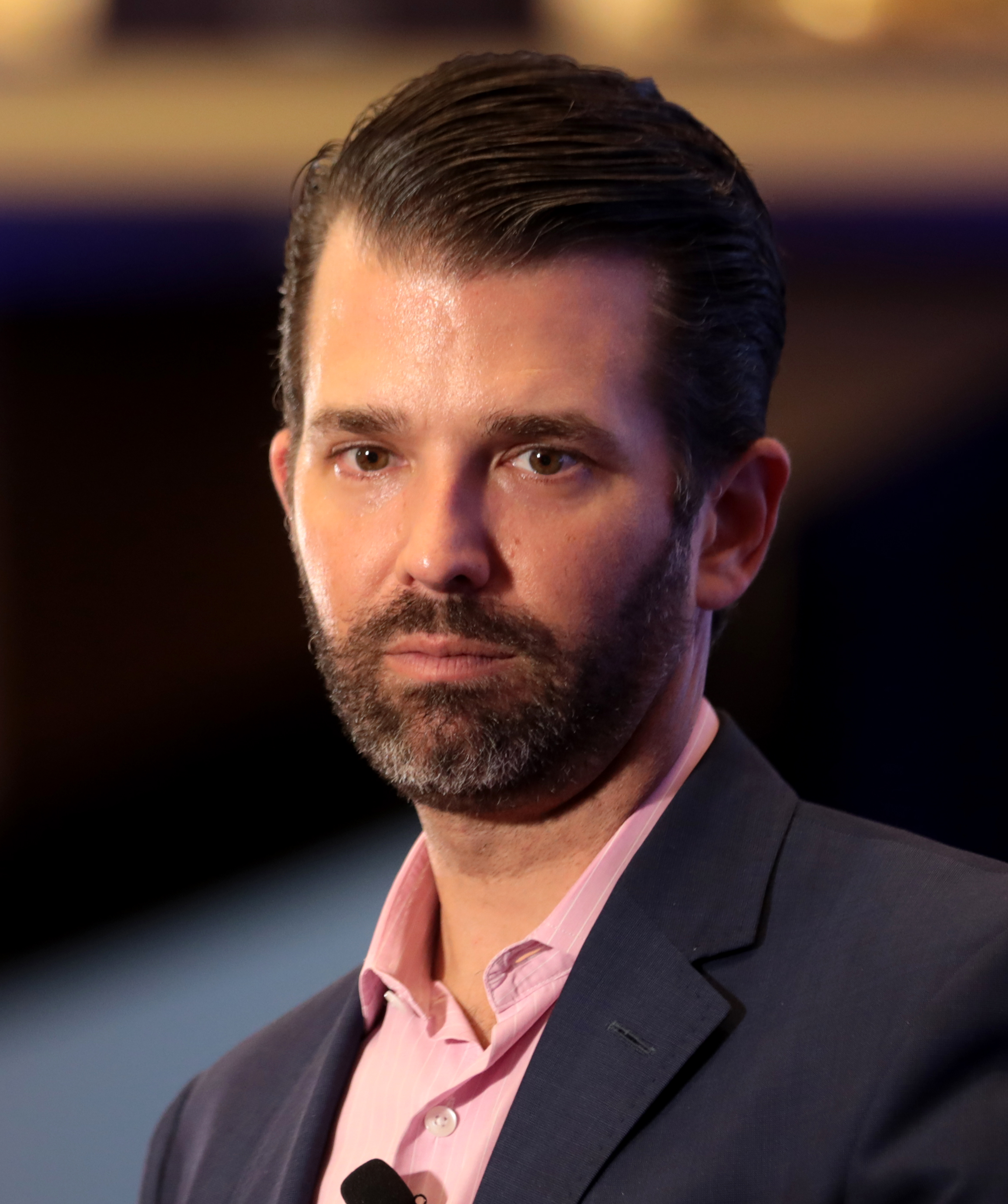
Trump's eldest child, Donald Jr., in 2019

On January 18, 2022, James filed a motion to compel Trump and his two oldest children to appear in court and provide documents, stating that "Thus far in our investigation, we have uncovered significant evidence that suggests Donald J. Trump and the Trump Organization falsely and fraudulently valued multiple assets and misrepresented those values to financial institutions for economic benefit." Additionally, James accused Trump of making misstatements to the IRS. Investigators stated that the "focus of the subpoena, and the investigation, is Mr. Trump's statement of financial condition," alleging that Trump's financial statements were used to secure more than $300 million in loans, and that these "were generally inflated as part of a pattern to suggest that Mr. Trump's net worth was higher than it otherwise would have appeared". According to the AG's motion, over 930,000 documents had been provided by the organization in response to subpoenas and about a dozen employees and former employees had provided testimony. However, of over five million documents provided by the company overall, only three were provided by Trump himself; two of these were cited in the AG's motion, in addition to Trump's federal income tax information, which he approved the release of to the AG. Trump's handwriting and signature are present on some of the hard-copy documents.

The New York AG's filing cites financial inaccuracies including the organization's golf course near Aberdeen, Scotland, which the AG said was valued at $435 million by Trump in 2014, over twice its previous year estimate. This was apparently based on the potential building of 2,500 luxury homes, despite less than 1,500 of such units being approved by Scottish officials. Weisselberg had been unable to explain the discrepancy. Additionally, James cited Trump's own three-story apartment in Trump Tower, which he reported as being 30,000 square feet (2,800 square metres); according to the New York AG it is actually about 11,000 square feet (1,000 square metres). A 2017 Forbes article supports the smaller figure and estimates the apartment's value to be less than a third of Trump's valuation of over $200 million. According to a later court filing by the AG, Weisselberg "admitted that the apartment's value had been overstated by 'give or take' $200 million". During the trial, it surfaced that in 1994, prior to his overstatement, Trump had admitted his penthouse's smaller size.

On February 1, 2022, lawyers for the Trumps filed a request for the subpoenas to be "quashed", again alleging James's "political animus" and that she had thereby violated the Equal Protection Clause of both the Constitution of the United States and New York as well as a state criminal procedural law, the latter two of which the filing states "created protections for subpoenaed witnesses that federal law does not provide". The filing cites the two state laws as dictating that "an agency conducting a criminal investigation through an active grand jury is required, if the witness is subpoenaed, to examine the subject or target of the investigation [in front of] the grand jury."

On February 9, 2022, Mazars informed the organization that it would no longer support the financial statements it had prepared for the organization from mid-2010 to mid-2020, owing to findings from the New York AG's January 18 filing and other sources. A Trump Organization spokesperson claimed that the development "effectively renders the investigations by the [Manhattan District Attorney] and AG moot". On February 14, separate court filings were made on behalf of the AG and Trump; James cited the Mazars correspondence in requesting that her subpoenas be upheld, and lawyers for Trump said he lacked knowledge of potentially misleading financial statements. In a five-page statement issued the next day, Trump claimed that Mazars had cut ties with him because of "vicious intimidation tactics" by investigators and that his brand value made up for any alleged financial discrepancies. James argued that this contradicted the defensive pleading from a day earlier.

=== Ruling on subpoenas ===
On February 17, 2022, Judge Arthur Engoron ruled in favor of James's subpoenas. In response to Trump's lawyer Alina Habba's request for the civil investigation to be paused until the conclusion of the criminal inquiry, Engoron cited the fact that neither the AG nor DA had subpoenaed the Trumps to appear before a jury. However, Engoron affirmed that refusals by the Trumps to answer potentially incriminating questions in the civil case should not be cited in the criminal matter. Defense lawyers asserted that Donald Trump would only testify for a criminal grand jury, which would grant him immunity. The lawyer for Donald Jr., and Ivanka, Alan Futerfas, admitted that there was no evidence that the two Trump children were targets of the criminal probe. Habba accused James of bias and "prosecutorial misconduct", to which Engoron maintained that "a prosecutor [disliking] someone does not prevent a prosecution," stating, "If Ms. James has a thing against [Trump], that's not ... unlawful discrimination. He's just a bad guy she should go after as the chief law enforcement officer of the state." Habba also claimed that Trump belongs to a protected class, which the judge pointed out is reserved for categorizations such as race, religion, and sex—not political persuasion. (Note: Additionally, Habba asked whether the AG would "go after Hillary Clinton" in response to a right-wing conspiracy theory that Clinton had spied on President Trump (based on an apparent misreading of a court filing by John Durham).) In his ruling, Engoron derided the organization's portrayal of the AG case as "moot" and set deadlines of 14 days for Donald Trump to produce requested documents and 21 days for depositions from all three Trumps. A notice of appeal was filed on February 28.

On March 3, 2022, Engoron approved an agreement between James and the Trumps: Donald Trump would provide the requested documents by March 31, and the Trumps would not have to testify while the appeal was processed. On March 28, James moved to uphold that all three Trumps must testify, citing an example of a group of apartments being valued in financial statements at $50 million, over 66 times the outside evaluation of $750,000. A state appellate court heard arguments on May 11. On May 26, the First Judicial Department of the Supreme Court of New York State upheld Engoron's February ruling that the Trumps must testify, stating, "The existence of a criminal investigation does not preclude civil discovery of related facts." Per an agreement made by the Trumps' lawyers in March, the defendants were to be deposed within two weeks, but this was postponed to July 15–22. On June 8, the three Trumps filed a notice of appeal to the New York Court of Appeals, the state's highest court. On June 14, that court dismissed the request (as well as a separate request to stay the subpoenas) on the basis that no "substantial constitutional question" had been raised requiring intervention.

On March 28, 2022, Engoron ordered a forensics company hired by the Trumps to provide its findings by April 22 and approved the organization's request to comply with a subpoena by April 29.

On April 8, 2022, James asked the court to compel real-estate firm Cushman & Wakefield, which conducted appraisals for several Trump Organization properties (before cutting ties in January 2021), to comply with a February 2022 subpoena as well as an earlier one that was partially fulfilled. A Cushman spokesperson stated that it was untrue that the firm had not responded to the subpoenas "in good faith". On April 25, Engoron allowed the OAG to name Cushman & Wakefield as a respondent in the civil inquiry and ordered the firm to provide subpoenaed documents. The subpoenas target five appraisers in particular who the AG alleges made misstatements on behalf of the organization. On May 11, the firm appealed the subpoenas on the basis that complying would compromise the privacy of clients unrelated to the inquiry, but stated that "we wish to continue working with the [AG]". On June 16, a state appeals court dismissed the appeals.

Some 800,000 pages of documents were provided by a late June deadline, but those directly related to Trump or the organization remained outstanding. Two days after the deadline passed, the real-estate firm requested two more weeks to comply with the unsatisfied subpoena as an e-discovery firm searches through millions of Cushman employee emails to find relevant data. On July 1, the OAG asked Engoron to compel the firm to immediately turn over the subpoenaed documents, arguing that the firm knew the extent of the request by late April. On July 5, the judge ruled that the firm would be held in contempt, with a $10,000 daily fine starting on July 7. The firm said it would appeal the ruling. On August 5, the OAG disclosed that it had received over 35,000 documents from the firm and asked for the contempt order to be purged.

=== Contempt finding ===
On April 7, 2022, James asked the court to hold Trump in civil contempt and impose a daily fine of $10,000 for "not [complying] at all" with the March 31 deadline for subpoenaed documents; his lawyers had instead raised new objections and argued that the documents could only be produced by the organization. On April 19, Trump again claimed in a court filing that he did not have the documents. On April 25, Engoron held Trump in civil contempt and approved a $10,000 daily fine. On April 29, Engoron rejected an affidavit from Trump denying that he had the requested documents and ordered him to file a new one answering "where he believes such files are currently located" to release him from contempt.

On May 2, 2022, Habba requested that the appellate division of New York's First Judicial Department stay Engoron's contempt order, which the appeals judge rejected the next day, referring the matter to a full bench. On May 6, Trump's lawyers filed a 66-page document detailing the search for subpoenaed documents and an affidavit from Trump swearing that there were no relevant documents that had not yet been produced; he mentioned that four of his cell phones had gone missing, including one he received from the organization in 2015 and one which was "taken" from him while he was president. (Note: Attorneys for the AG objected that Trump did not explain how he lost his phones.)

On May 11, 2022, Engoron agreed to purge Trump's contempt on the basis of certain conditions being met by May 20, including that Trump pay a retroactively reduced fine of $110,000, the completion of a third-party firm's search, and that further affidavits explain the organization's document-retention policies. (Note: A state lawyer complained that the reviewed subpoenaed documents lacked any sticky notes, which Trump is known to have used, while according to Habba the organization's general counsel said these had been given to the AG's office.) The first two conditions were met on May 19. Late on May 20, several people involved in keeping Donald Trump's records, including his longtime executive assistant Rhona Graff, provided Trump's lawyers with affidavits as part of the effort to lift Trump's contempt status. Trump's counsel reported that they were unable to contact twelve of his other former executive assistants. On May 23, the OAG submitted a court filing opposed to clearing the contempt order until June 1 so an unlisted executive assistant could provide an affidavit and Graff could answer questions unsatisfied by her affidavit.

On May 31, 2022, Graff disclosed that the organization did not have a document-retention policy and she could not recall Trump keeping copies of documents. On June 1, the OAG and the defense counsel agreed that by June 3 the latter would provide a report of their effort to contact nonrespondent former executive assistants, as well as an affidavit from executive assistant Molly Michael, who is involved with the pro-Trump and Trump-controlled Save America political action committee (PAC) but not the organization. (Note: Both Habba's firm and Trump lawyer Alan Futerfas have received payments from the PAC.) A June 3 court filing revealed that of a dozen former Trump executive assistants, a voicemail had been left for six, two claimed they would call back and four could not be contacted. Citing Graff's testimony as conflicting with Trump's claim in late April that it was his "customary practice to delegate document handling and retention responsibilities to ... executive assistants", the AG asked the judge to require the submission of additional evidence by June 13.

On June 8, 2022, Engoron ruled that Trump would remain in contempt unless officials from the organization provide by June 17 sworn statements explaining what happened to Trump's handwritten instructions after they were delivered to the organization's golf, hotel, legal and marketing departments. On June 19, Business Insider cited a former organization employee who stated that there was no document-retention policy regarding Trump's written instructions and "In most cases you either threw it in the garbage or ... the shredder." (Trump testified for the E. Jean Carroll case that he and a longtime executive assistant "keep documents ... We keep everything.") The OAG had until June 20 to decide whether it was satisfied with the compliance of Trump's company regarding subpoenaed documents. On that date, the OAG agreed to the contempt order being lifted. On June 29, Engoron lifted the order but directed the $110,000 fine to be held in an escrow account during the continuing appeal effort. On February 14, a three-judge panel upheld the fine.

=== Later events ===
On April 25, 2022, the senior enforcement counsel for the OAG stated that "The process is near the end." A statute of limitations to file a lawsuit based on alleged misconduct, which was suspended by the organization to allow time to review documents, was set to expire on April 30. On June 2, James stated that there was clear evidence of fraudulent valuation by Trump and suggested the dissolution of the organization as one action a lawsuit could call for. Anti-fraud laws which could be cited include New York's Martin Act and Executive Law § 63(12); both have previously been employed by the OAG, the latter against two Trump businesses.

In July 2022, a Black former employee of Trump lawyer Alina Habba sued her on an accusation of racial discrimination after Habba allegedly shouted "I hate that Black bitch!" referring to the AG in response to losing a case against the AG. The filing also cites Habba's habit of rapping the word "nigger" with a colleague, of which audio recordings exist, as well as other slurs against Blacks and Jews. According to the suit, Habba defended herself by saying "I am a fucking minority myself!" (citing her Arab descent) and arguing, "Everybody listens to Kanye West—and I'm not allowed to?"

After a delay imposed by the July 14, 2022, death of their mother Ivana Trump, Donald Jr. and Ivanka were reportedly deposed on July 28 and August 3, respectively. Neither reportedly pleaded the Fifth Amendment, with Donald Jr. reportedly answering all questions. It was later revealed that Donald Jr. testified that his knowledge of accounting was minimal and that from 2010 onwards, he did not help prepare the company's financial statements and had at most influenced them via tangential input; he stated that he signed financial documents on the recommendation of accounting or legal staff. He further stated that he had done "all the leasing" of 40 Wall Street. Donald Sr. was deposed on August 10 and reportedly pleaded the Fifth over 400 times, with his only detailed comment reputedly being an attack on the AG and her inquiry. (Note: Ahead of this, Trump called the New York AG "racist" on Truth Social and further stated, "My great company, and myself, are being attacked from all sides. Banana Republic!" Florida Governor Ron DeSantis had recently used the same term to denounce the FBI search of Mar-a-Lago on August 8.) The Daily Beast later reported that Trump's lawyers had requested that the deposition be moved to Trump Tower, reputedly due to security concerns of the Secret Service. On September 13, the service denied having raised such concerns. Also in September, the OAG reportedly rejected a settlement offer from the organization.

== Civil complaint ==
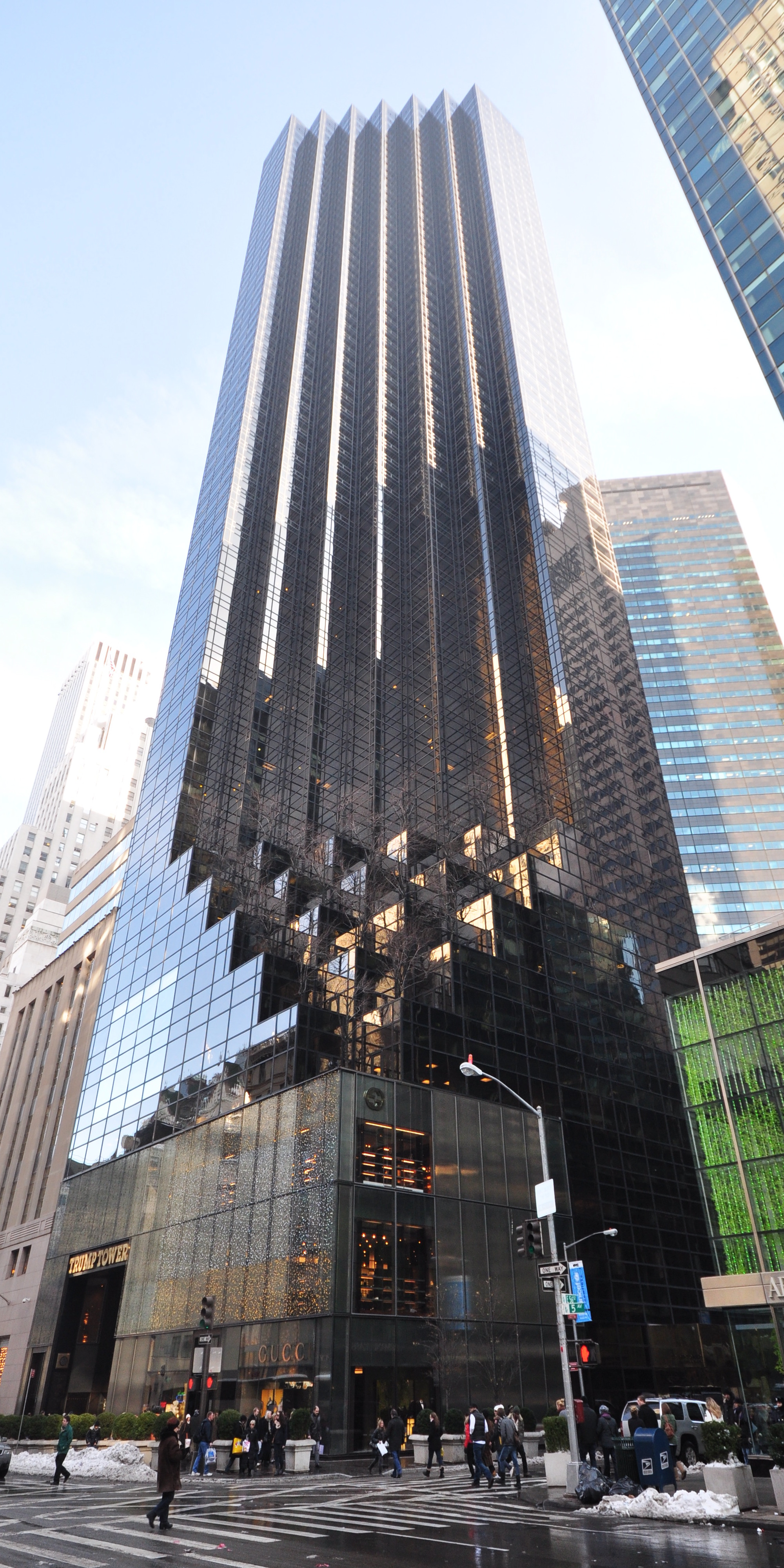
Trump Tower (Manhattan), cited in the AG's lawsuit for alleged financial misreporting

At a September 21, 2022, press conference, James announced a lawsuit against Trump, his three oldest children, and the organization for fraud and other forms of misrepresentation, citing over 200 alleged instances and asserting that Trump "wildly exaggerated his net worth by billions of dollars". James cited New York Executive Law § 63(12) as lending her "broad and special powers".

=== Defendants ===
The complaint named the following people and other entities as defendants:

- Donald J. Trump, President and Chairman of the Trump Organization
- Donald Trump, Jr., an Executive Vice President of the Trump Organization
- Eric Trump, an Executive Vice President of the Trump Organization
- Ivanka Trump, an Executive Vice President for Development and Acquisitions of the Trump Organization (dismissed before trial)
- Allen Weisselberg, Chief Financial Officer of the Trump Organization
- Jeffrey McConney, Controller of the Trump Organization
- The Donald J. Trump Revocable Trust, the legal owner of the entities constituting the Trump Organization
- The Trump Organization, Inc.
- Trump Organization LLC
- DJT Holdings LLC
- DJT Holdings Managing Member
- Trump Endeavor 12 LLC, which owns Trump National Doral Miami
- 401 North Wabash Venture LLC, which owns Trump International Hotel and Tower in Chicago
- Trump Old Post Office LLC, which held the lease on the Old Post Office in Washington, D.C.
- 40 Wall Street LLC, which holds a lease on 40 Wall Street in Manhattan
- Seven Springs LLC, which owns Seven Springs in Westchester County

=== Charges ===
The complaint listed seven causes of action, all in violation of New York Executive Law § 63(12):

- "Persistent and repeated fraudulent acts," namely "misrepresentations, false or misleading statements, and statements that were misleading by omission, concealment, or suppression of information"
- Making of "false entries" and "omission of true entries in the business records of an enterprise with the intent to commit another crime or aid or conceal the omission thereof—including the issuance of a false financial statement under Penal Law § 175.45 and insurance-fraud violations"
- Engaging in "a conspiracy to falsify business records as defined by New York Penal Law"
- Making "materially inaccurate written instruments purporting to describe Donald Trump’s financial condition"
- Engaging in "a conspiracy to issue false financial statements as defined by New York Penal Law"
- Preparing and presenting "written statements in support of applications for insurance knowing they contained materially false information" and "conceal[ing], for the purpose of misleading insurers, information concerning facts material to those written statements"
- Engaging in "a conspiracy to commit insurance fraud as defined by New York Penal Law"

The lawsuit asserts that between 2011 and 2021 Donald Trump and the organization made over 200 "false and misleading valuations of assets on his annual Statements of Financial Condition to defraud financial institutions" and, amongst other charges, that he used low valuations to avoid paying between $85 and $150 million in interest charges on loans from Deutsche Bank. The suit seeks about $250 million in damages, the instatement of a five-year ban on the company conducting real-estate transactions in the state and a permanent bar against Trump and his three oldest children from officiating or directing any business or corporation in New York state. Additionally, James cited evidence of potential criminal insurance and bank fraud, for which she referred the case to federal criminal prosecutors in Manhattan and the IRS.

Besides the inflated values of Trump's Manhattan triplex—as well as its square footage—and 40 Wall Street, James's lawsuit alleges that in his financial statements, Trump inflated the value of Mar-a-Lago by perhaps ten times (with his value based on potentially developing the property for residential use, which is prevented by the deed). Trump also omitted restrictions regarding his 30% share in 1290 Avenue of the Americas (which probably prevent him from selling it for decades) and portrayed his interests as cash, while overstating the building's overall value by $1.5 billion. According to the suit, the organization valued Trump Park Avenue at $350 million, while a 2010 valuation found it to be worth $72.5 million. Twelve rent-stabilized apartments in that building were appraised by a bank at a total of $750,000, but claimed by the organization to be worth as much as $50 million. Further, Trump purportedly multiplied the value of 4–8 East 57th Street by a fixed percentage to inflate its valuation to $422 million, while neglecting to mention that his rent to the property owner was significantly increasing. The suit also asserts that, while renewing the company's coverage with Zurich Insurance Group, Weisselberg falsely claimed that the organization's assets had been reviewed by an independent appraiser.

Speaking with Fox News host Sean Hannity on the day the lawsuit was filed, Trump asserted that the disclaimers provided by Mazars on its financial statements for the organization absolve him of fraud because they admit the valuations "may be way off". (Note: The disclaimers note that "Donald J. Trump is responsible for the preparation and fair presentation of the financial statement".) (Note: On September 27, 2022, Trump claimed on John Catsimatidis's radio show that he did not misrepresent his assets to banks, saying they were "fully paid" back, and criticized the AG for not focusing instead on "murderers walking down the street".)

On October 13, 2022, as neither Donald nor Eric Trump had yet accepted service of the lawsuit, the OAG asked Judge Engoron for permission to electronically deliver the lawsuit to them, which he granted; the AG emailed links to relevant documents the same day.

== Pre-trial proceedings ==
On the day the lawsuit was filed, the organization registered a Delaware-based limited liability company (LLC) called Trump Organization II with the New York Secretary of State. The OAG accused the organization of continuing to engage in fraud after the suit was filed and possibly beginning to restructure its business, and asked Engoron to order Trump to sufficiently disclose valuation methods to an independent monitor when dealing with lenders or insurers. Additionally, the OAG requested a trial date for a year in the future. In response to the filing, Habba stated: "We have repeatedly provided assurance, in writing, that the Trump Organization has no intention of doing anything improper."

On October 25, 2022, an administrative judge refused to have the case reassigned to another judge. On October 26, the organization requested a dismissal of James's request for an independent monitor, with Habba labeling it an attempt at nationalization. (Note: On his social media company, Truth Social, Trump labeled Engoron as the only person worse than James, calling him "vicious, biased, and mean" and referring to the civil case as part of a "Communist takeover" of his company.)

=== Florida counter-lawsuit ===
On November 2, 2022, Trump filed a lawsuit (largely the work of his counsel Boris Epshteyn) in a Florida circuit court asking for an injunction against James, asserting that she (in a continuation of purported personal and political hostility) wishes to obtain records related to Trump's revocable trust (the organization's owner), which arguably fall under the protection of privacy rights granted by the Constitution of Florida. On November 3, the AG argued that Trump's lawsuit was an attempt "to shield the key documents governing the structure of his business conglomerate". Later in the month, the lawsuit was removed to federal court. James requested on December 7 that the suit be dismissed, and the following week, requested as much on the basis that she has no connection to Florida. On December 21, federal judge Donald Middlebrooks dismissed the suit, and Trump withdrew it on January 20, 2023.

=== Appointment of monitor ===
On November 3, 2022, Engoron noted "persistent misrepresentations throughout every one of Mr. Trump's [financial statements] between 2011 and 2021" and said the AG's lawsuit was likely to succeed. Engoron then:

- imposed an independent monitor, calling it "the most prudent and narrowly tailored mechanism to ensure there is no further fraud or illegality";
- ruled that the organization must gain court approval before selling assets "to ensure that defendants do not dissipate their [assets] or transfer them out of this jurisdiction" and required Trump to provide 14 days notice before transferring any non-cash asset listed on his 2021 financial statement;
- dismissed Trump's argument that Mazars' disclaimers protect him.

Both the OAG and organization were asked to suggest three candidates for the monitor by November 10 and to comment on the other's choices, though the final selection would be up to Engoron. On November 7, lawyers for the organization appealed the appointment of a monitor, claiming that it would limit their business activities in "unlawful" ways. The appeal hearing was set for later in the month. The company's lawyers also asked for the order to be stayed pending the appeal, but this was denied. Both sides suggested retired judge Barbara S. Jones, (Note: In September 2022, Jones was one of two candidates the federal government suggested to serve as a special master to review documents taken in the FBI search of Mar-a-Lago, although a special master was later ruled to be unnecessary.) who was appointed that month and began monitoring the organization by December. On December 5, Ivanka Trump was relieved from the monitoring process since she was no longer involved with the company.

=== Scheduling and other motions ===
On November 21, 2022, lawyers for the Trumps and the organization asked for the lawsuit to be dismissed. The next day, Engoron denied the organization's request to delay trial for at least 15 months, tentatively scheduling it for October 2, 2023. On January 6, 2023, Engoron dismissed the request to dismiss the lawsuit, which he called frivolous due to it relying on previously rebuffed arguments, although he decided against imposing sanctions on Trump's lawyers; the judge rejected arguments that some alleged illegal conduct had occurred outside the statute of limitations and also denied a request from Ivanka Trump to dismiss the charges against her. Lawyers for the Trumps appealed.

On January 26, 2023, Trump's lawyers disputed the lawsuit's definitions of the "Trump Organization" and "defendants", saying they were improperly associated with one another, and arguing that the corporation does not exist "for legal purposes". The suit only uses the name "Trump Organization" generally and does not specify it as a defendant, but does name 10 of its entities including "The Trump Organization, Inc." corporation. It also names as defendants Donald Trump, his three oldest children, Weisselberg, and Jeffrey McConney, a senior vice president and controller who worked at the company for almost 35 years.

On January 31, 2023, the OAG requested a pre-trial conference to discuss imposing sanctions on the Trumps due to some of the defenses they provided the court with being "demonstrably false" due to their contradictory nature, reliance on dismissed arguments, or other failures to address allegations made against them or their company. A hearing about the matter was held on February 1, which Habba was absent from. Trump lawyers argued against sanctions and the suit's use of the organization's name, while the AG's senior enforcement counsel complained that in the January 26 filing, the defendants had avoided admitting that Trump remained the de facto president of the company during his tenure as U.S. president (which he stated under oath in another lawsuit); the judge affirmed that the trial would be held on October 2.

=== Further subpoenas and discovery ===
In mid-February 2023, Trump's team subpoenaed former Deutsche Bank managing director Rosemary Vrablic, who served as his private banker for years, for documents and testimony related to the case. They had also subpoenaed Mazars accountant Donald Bender, who served the organization for a number of years. By the end of February, Trump's team also subpoenaed Michael Cohen, and the AG indicated that she may attempt to redepose Donald and Eric Trump.

Despite the judge's firm trial date, on March 3, 2023, Trump's team asked for a six-month suspension for further discovery and preparation. They cited a "staggering volume" of 275,000 documents to review (which, according to the vice president of the Republican-tied e-discovery firm which prepared the data, would take 11,000 man-hours to read) as well as subpoenas to carry out. The OAG held that most of the documents come from Trump's circles and should thus already be familiar to the defense. Ivanka Trump's counsel also requested a delay to prepare a defense (centered on her lack of involvement in preparing allegedly fraudulent statements) on the basis of her role in the case being uniquely complicated. On March 15, James asked the judge to deny Donald Trump's delay request to avoid being further delayed by his 2024 campaign. On March 21, Engoron ruled that the trial date was "written in stone", but allowed the pushback of some deadlines for the defendants to collect evidence.

On April 13, 2023, Trump sat for a second deposition, which lasted seven hours. Trump reiterated his 2022 claims that a clause on statements the organization provided to banks said not to believe them and that banks had been fully reimbursed for loans (even when he was president of the country and not the company). He said he was no longer the organization's "ultimate decision-making authority", saying, "My son Eric is much more involved with it than I am." (Note: Trump continued, "I've been doing other things ... you could say on something major, final decisions, whatever. But I've been much less involved in it than... over the last five ... or six years – than ever before.") He further defended his reputation as preventing a nuclear holocaust and said the organization had $400 million in cash. Trump's lawyers released a transcript of the deposition on August 30.

On April 18, the two attorneys solely representing Ivanka Trump withdrew from the case. On April 21, a Troutman Pepper lawyer informed the court that he would be Ivanka's only attorney on the case (while the two lawyers she shared with Donald Jr. and Eric Trump would continue to represent her brothers). In an April 25 court filing, the OAG stated that the defendants had failed to provide communications as part of the discovery process. Most substantially, Ivanka's counsel, who had been ordered to provide all of her emails from 2014 to 2017, had shared far less for the later part of that timeframe (averaging 1,200 for early 2014 compared to under 50 a month for 2016), with no substantive explanation or a timeline for compliance (though it was acknowledged that the April 30 deadline would not be met). The judge set new deadlines of May 12 for all documents and May 15 for compliance-confirming affidavits from the Trumps, with Ivanka's team required to explain its search process against a potential charge of perjury. (On June 27, an appellate court recommended that Ivanka be released from the case due to expired statutes of limitations.)

On April 28, Cohen was deposed by Trump's lawyers.

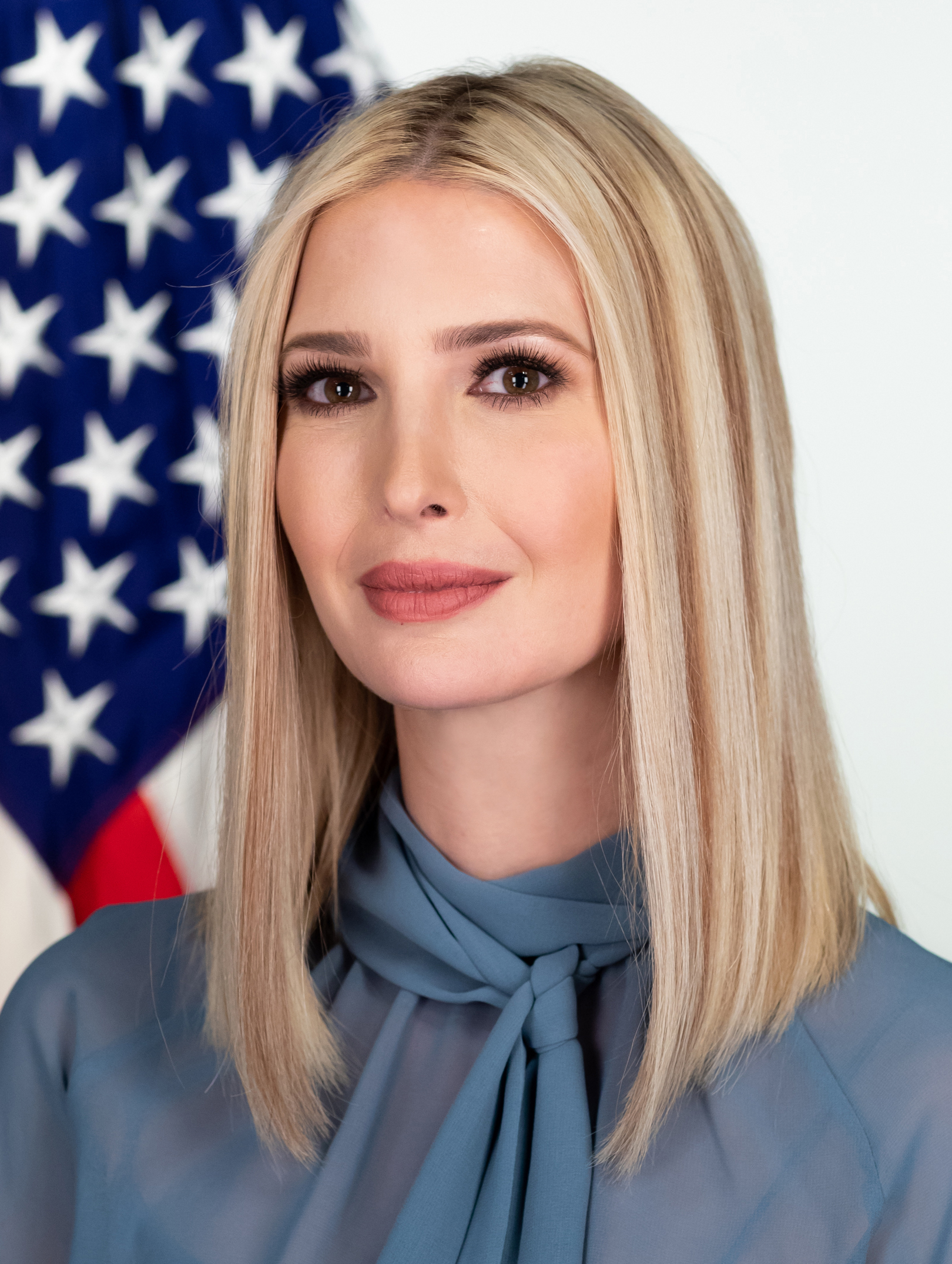
Trump's second-oldest child, Ivanka, had left the company by early 2017. This caused the charges against her to be dismissed due to a statute of limitations.

On June 27, 2023, the state's appellate division ruled that the case could continue, but that statutes of limitations limited allegedly illegal transactions from being charged if they concluded before July 13, 2014, respecting an August 2021 tolling agreement between the OAG and the organization. The appellate court reasoned that because Ivanka was no longer part of the organization by the agreement's date and definition, the toll did not apply to her, barring claims of illegal actions from before February 6, 2016, including many relevant transactions the OAG alleges she was "a key player" in. Arguing that no more recent criminal activity by Ivanka had been evidenced, the court ruled that the OAG's allegations against her "should have been dismissed" but left it to the New York Supreme Court to determine "the full range of defendants bound by the tolling agreement". (Note: An August 2023 summary judgment request from the defense regards Ivanka as dismissed.)

On July 31, 2023, the OAG declared that its discovery for the trial was complete and noted that it would reserve its "right to seek relief after trial relating to the Defendants' spoliation of evidence".

=== Later proceedings ===
On August 30, 2023, the AG asked the judge to grant a summary judgment on the suit's claim that Trump and the organization had fraudulently lied about his wealth and valuations, between 2011 and 2021 increasing his net worth by 17–39% ($812 million–$2.2 billion). In response, Trump's lawyers asked for the case to be dismissed, saying that the organization's statements were not misleading; the same day, they released a transcript of Trump's April 2023 deposition. On September 5, Trump's lawyers requested a stay of the case until three weeks after the judge ruled on summary judgment motions; the next day, the judge denied the request, calling it "completely without merit".

On September 5, 2023, the OAG asked Engoron to impose $20,000 in fines against Trump's team for repeating arguments which seemed "frivolous even the first time defendants made them".

On September 8, the judge announced that the trial would be a bench trial (a trial by judge, not jury), and that it could last from October 2 until December 22, 2023.

On September 14, citing state legislation dealing with administrative misconduct, Trump's team asked New York appeals judge David Friedman for a legal intervention against Engoron, asserting that both he and the AG were defying appellate orders. Specifically, the judge had not yet determined which organization activities were too old for the AG to examine for fraud, although was expected to in coming days. (Note: On September 20, the OAG cautioned against any delay to the planned trial, opining that it could serve as precedent to setting back several other proceedings against Trump.) On September 28, the appellate court denied Trump's request for a delay. On October 5, the defense dropped the request with prejudice.

On September 15, The Daily Beast reported that the OAG had proposed 57 witnesses to call at trial, including personnel from Deutsche Bank (including Vrablic), Zurich Insurance Group, and Cushman & Wakefield. The possible witness lists of both the prosecution and defense were published on September 28, including 28 and 127 people, respectively. Both lists include Donald, Donald Jr. and Eric Trump. (Defendants can be called to testify in civil cases, and if they refuse, that fact can be used against them.)

On September 22, Trump's lawyer Chris Kise asked for the case to be dismissed, arguing that no one was harmed by his clients' transactions. Engoron, who was also considering the AG's request to impose sanctions for making frivolous (and previously dismissed) arguments, ruled that "fairness in the marketplace" was a victim. (Note: The judge noted that if he issued an agreement with the defense's summary judgment request, there would be no trial.) The summary judgement quoted an earlier ruling that "in varying contexts, courts have held that a state has a quasi-sovereign interest in protecting the integrity of the marketplace".

On October 4, Trump's team appealed the judge's refusal to dismiss the case.

=== Summary judgment and sanctions ===
On September 26, 2023, Engoron issued a summary judgment holding that the AG had sufficiently documented that the defendants (excluding Ivanka) had for years committed fraud against banks, insurers and others by exaggerating Trump's net worth and significantly overvaluing assets in documents used to make deals and secure financing. Engoron dismissed Trump's assertion that he and the organization were absolved because disclaimers said their statements could not be relied on. The judge ordered the termination of the defendants's New York business licenses; a number of LLCs were expected to be dissolved, with the defendants given 30 days to recommend potential independent receivers to oversee this. Examples of alleged fraud cited by Engoron include two of Trump's places of residence: his apartment in Trump Tower (both its size and value being roughly tripled) and Mar-a-Lago (being inflated by perhaps 22 times and possibly subject to New York litigation as an organization asset.) (Note: In his summary judgment, Engoron noted that between 2011 and 2021, the assessor of Palm Beach County valued Mar-a-Lago between $18 million and $27.6 million. In 2020, the organization valued it at $27 million, but in other instances valued it between $426.5 million and $612 million. At trial, Trump asserted that "the house" was actually worth between $750 million and $1.5 billion (i.e. at least 27 times the 2020 valuation). Mar-a-Lago is "deed restricted" such that it cannot be used for any purpose other than as a private club. Consequently, appraisers value the property on the basis of its annual net operating income, rather than the resale or reconstruction value as a home, as would be the case for an unrestricted property.)

Additionally, on September 26, Engoron sanctioned five defense lawyers $7,500 each for "intentional and blatant disregard of controlling authority and law of the case" by repeating arguments that had already been rejected several times by the New York Supreme Court and the appellate division. According to Engoron, the "defendants' obstreperous conduct" was worsened by "their continued reliance on bogus arguments", with defendants presenting a "fantasy world" where "rent regulated apartments are worth the same as unregulated apartments", etc. Engoron stated that Trump's defenses were "wholly without basis in fact or law", especially that past property values were not inflated because the values supposedly rose years after the evaluation or because a "buyer from Saudi Arabia" would pay any price.

On October 5, Judge Engoron ordered Trump to name "entities controlled or beneficially owned by Donald J. Trump" and allowed 30 days for both parties to recommend a receiver. It was expected that they would both recommend Barbara S. Jones.

Trump's team appealed the summary judgment and asked for both it and the trial to be paused in the meantime. On October 6, an appeals court judge denied the request to suspend the trial but suspended the breaking up of Trump's New York businesses, including the revocation of relevant certificates, until the appeal was processed.

== Trial ==
The trial was held October 2, 2023 – January 11, 2024. It was expected to address James's six claims not covered by the summary judgment, which include falsifying business records, conspiracy, insurance fraud, and issuing false financial statements; further judgment was expected to consist of a $250 million disgorgement of ill-gotten gains and/or barring Trump and other defendants from the New York real-estate business for five years, as well as specifically barring them from acquiring real estate or applying for loans.

=== Prosecution case ===
==== Week 1 ====
The trial began on October 2, 2023. Engoron was set to decide the facts of the case because neither the defense nor the prosecution requested a jury trial (despite Trump's assertion days earlier that he had not been allowed one). Trump's lawyer Alina Habba claimed that Trump wanted a jury trial, but the form filed by his lawyers indicates that they consented to a "trial without jury". Judge Engoron later said that a jury trial would not have been an option, since the state was only seeking disgorgement of ill-gotten gains and was not seeking damages.

Trump voluntarily attended the first two days, and part of the third day, of his trial in New York City. On the first day, Trump railed against Engoron before entering the courtroom and during a lunch break, alleging he was a "rogue judge" and a Democratic operative who should be disbarred for an illegal judgment and interference in the 2024 election.

On October 3, Trump posted on Truth Social the name, photograph and social-media account of Engoron's law clerk, with a false allegation about her. It had already been circulated to millions of recipients. Engoron ordered him to delete it; Trump told Engoron he did so, and Engoron accepted that as "apparently" true. Engoron then issued a gag order "forbidding all parties from posting, emailing or speaking publicly about any members of my staff".

On October 4, Trump called James a "political animal" and accused Engoron of having already made up his mind on how he would rule. He left the proceedings partway, telling journalists near his motorcade that he disliked being "stuck here", although his attendance was not required. After he left, James told reporters that Trump had treated his trial as "a political stunt, a fundraising stop".

On October 5, the court continued to hear testimony from longtime Trump accountant Donald Bender. Bender said he did not recall ever consulting with Donald Trump Jr. or Ivanka Trump about the financial statements. Former organization controller Jeff McConney (who had overseen finances there for nearly 35 years until his retirement in early 2023) also testified. He told the court that he had received $375,000 of his severance payment and that he expected the company to pay him another $125,000.

McConney continued his testimony on October 6. He said that he and Weisselberg agreed to report the value of Trump Park Avenue as if the rent-stabilized apartments could be sold at market value and to attribute value to Trump's brand name at his golf clubs. He said he valued Mar-a-Lago as if it were residential (although legally it is not). He also said that in 2011, Eric Trump directed him to include the value of seven unbuilt homes at the Seven Springs development in the property's valuation.

==== Week 2 ====
On October 10, 2023, the court was shown a document signed by Trump in 1994 acknowledging the true size of his Trump Tower penthouse, a figure he nearly tripled in financial documents from 2012 onwards. Weisselberg testified that he would not have noticed this discrepancy because it seemed to him relatively inconsequential. He also said he would not have noticed that his figure for Seven Springs was a $230 million overvaluation above its appraisal. On the morning of October 12, Forbes published an article accusing Weisselberg of perjury when he said he "never focused" on the valuation of Trump's apartment, citing documents reputedly not provided to the OAG. (Note: Later that day, the AG asked the judge for an opportunity to review the article in order to determine whether communications between a Marcus & Millichap employee and Weisselberg (provided by that company) prove that the organization omitted subpoenaed documents.) Weisselberg also returned to the stand that morning, when he testified that Trump's three oldest children inquired about finances. When he left the organization, Weisselberg signed an agreement preventing his voluntary cooperation with investigators and was paid a severance of $2 million, the same amount he owed in his criminal plea deal, which he said was a "coincidence".

On October 11, a former Deutsche Bank risk management officer testified that Trump's financial statements helped him obtain larger loans and lower interest rates, including loans for $125 million for Trump's Doral, Florida, golf club in 2011 and his Chicago International Hotel and Tower in 2012. The bank's credit reports for Trump were shown on October 11 and 12. A banker for Deutsche Bank testified that over nearly a decade, Trump always made his payments on time, satisfying about $400 million in loans for his Doral golf club, his Chicago tower, and the Trump International Hotel Washington, D.C., with the bank making millions of dollars in interest. The same banker told a lawyer for the AG that the bank valued achieving the best possible interest rates, supporting James's argument that Trump defrauded lenders millions of dollars via interest breaks he obtained by exaggerating his net worth.

Organization assistant vice president Patrick Birney testified on October 12 that the 2017 Forbes article about Trump Tower (which revealed that Trump's claims about his penthouse size were overstated) prompted a revaluation of the property. Birney, Weisselberg, and other employees revalued the estate at $116 million in 2017 (down from $327 million in 2016) after researching transfers of similar Manhattan properties, namely a record-breaking purchase of a penthouse by billionaire Kenneth C. Griffin. Additionally, Birney testified that he researched Palm Beach homes to value Mar-a-Lago and did not learn of that property's 2002 deed classifying it as non-residential until the OAG pointed this out to him.

On October 13, the court was shown draft spreadsheets that Birney had prepared in 2017, which proposed marking up the value of some of Trump's assets by 15–35% under the guise of a "presidential premium". Birney said Weisselberg "probably" made the request for these inflated valuations, which were not ultimately used on Trump's financial statements.

==== Week 3 ====
Michael Cohen was expected to testify for at least two days during the week of October 16, 2023, but he announced on October 13 that a "pre-existing medical condition" would delay him from being able to testify. He later announced that he would testify the week of October 23.

On October 16, Birney testified that at some point between 2017 and 2019, Weisselberg told him that Trump wanted his net worth on financial statements to increase. Trump's attorneys asserted that this was hearsay.

Also on October 16, Trump, who has repeatedly insulted the AG, linked to a story by far-right activist Laura Loomer containing James's home address. The court's gag order only applies to its staff and does not protect others involved in the trial.

On October 17, Trump reappeared at trial and told reporters that Mar-a-Lago was worth between $750 million and $1.5 billion.

On October 18, Trump attended trial for the first part of the day. Organization executive Doug Larson stated during his cross-examination that he was surprised that the organization had documented that he advised valuations. Larson denied incorrectly appraising a building. (Note: This led Trump to grumble. A court employee walked towards the podium while addressing him, causing her arrest. A lawyer for the AG implied that Trump's utterances were intended to intimidate the witness, prompting the judge to request for quiet.) He was then shown emails indicating that he helped with valuations in 2013, despite his denial of this the previous day. After an interjection from defense attorney Chris Kise imploring that Larson to be allowed to consult his lawyer (to suggest he invoke his Fifth Amendment right to avoid further potential perjury), Larson affirmed that he did not remember advising the company on the valuation despite the evidence that he did so.

On October 19, the AG cited a Forbes article from a week earlier implying that the organization withheld subpoenaed evidence, which was separately provided by Marcus & Millichap. James suggested that an independent monitor conduct a forensic review of the organization's data from between August and September 2016.

Also on October 19, real-estate investment trust executive Jack Weisselberg (a son of Allen) testified that he partially relied on Trump's financial statements in securing a $160 million loan for the organization. Weisselberg said the value of Trump's liquid assets (stated to be over $300 million) was the most important factor in the deal, but that Trump's net worth (claimed at almost $5.8 billion in 2014) was a factor as well.

Additionally, on October 19, Cushman & Wakefield executive David McArdle testified. McArdle appraised 71 undeveloped residential units at New York's Trump National Golf Club Westchester, and stated that in 2014 and 2015 he also appraised conservation easements at the property, which would allow the organization to sacrifice its development rights and treat the difference in value as a charitable donation. McArdle determined that leaving the 71 units unbuilt would generate a donation of $43 million (in 2014) or $45.2 million (in 2015), but documents show that the organization valued the land at $101 million in those years. The AG asserted that the only basis for the increase was Eric Trump's verbal instruction. Additionally, McArdle testified that he was consulted for the appraisal of the Seven Springs grounds. In 2014, he valued it at $30–$50 million, while Donald Trump valued a portion of the property at $161 million. (Note: In emails at the time, McArdle stated to a colleague at the time that "Eric Trump has lofty ideas on value," and strategized with organization lawyers on how to present his valuation. McArdle testified that he thought a higher value would have lacked credibility and been of dubious legality. In 2023 pre-trial testimony, Eric Trump said he barely recognized McArdle's name and recalled little about appraising either property, saying, "I pour concrete. I operate properties.")

On the night of October 19, Ivanka Trump asked the court to dismiss her subpoena for witness testimony from the AG. Ivanka's lawyers argued that their client had been improperly served because the subpoenas were sent to three business addresses instead of her personal residence and because she no longer lived in New York.

On October 20, Engoron fined Donald Trump $5,000 for violating a gag order. Engoron wrote that, on October 3, he had privately ordered Trump to remove a disparaging online post about a court staffer; about 10 minutes later, Trump told the judge that he had taken it down. It appeared to have been removed from Truth Social. However, Engoron had learned on the evening of October 19 that the post remained on another website, where it had apparently been "for the past 17 days. I understand it was removed late last night, but only in response to an email from this Court." Engoron called this a "blatant violation" (with Trump lawyer Chris Kise arguing that it was an oversight) and warned that further infractions could result in imprisonment. He said "this Court is way beyond the 'warning' stage."

==== Week 4 ====
Michael Cohen testified on October 24, 2023, with Trump also present. Cohen said Trump tasked him with increasing his total asset values "based upon a number that [Trump] arbitrarily elected". Cohen said he and Allen Weisselberg would "reverse engineer" statements in order to meet the target number, with Weisselberg involving the three oldest Trump children in the process.

Cohen continued his testimony on October 25. During her cross-examination of Cohen, Habba protested (apparently in reference to the law clerk) that "It is incredibly distracting when there are eye rolls and constant whispering at the bench", which Engoron agreed to suppress. During a break, Trump told reporters in a hallway that "This judge is a very partisan judge, with a person who's very partisan sitting alongside of him, perhaps even much more partisan than he is." Trump testified that he was referring to Engoron and Cohen, to which Engoron replied, "The idea that that statement would refer to the witness, that doesn't make sense", instead regarding the comment as referring to his law clerk. The judge ruled it to constitute a second violation of Trump's gag order and fined Trump $10,000, warning him, "Don't do it again or it will be worse." Engoron previously warned that further incursions could result in imprisonment. A defense lawyer later confirmed that their side was worried about the law clerk.

Under cross-examination, Cohen agreed with a defense lawyer that Trump "never directed [Cohen] to inflate the numbers on his personal statement". This led to Trump's legal team requesting that the case be dismissed, which the judge denied. Trump claimed that Cohen "just admitted that we won the trial". Cohen went on to explain:

[Trump] did not specifically state, "Michael, go inflate the numbers." Donald Trump speaks like a mob boss, and what he does is he tells you what he wants without specifically telling you. So when he said to me, "I'm worth more than 5 billion. I'm actually worth maybe 6, maybe 7, could be 8," we understood what he wanted.

When Cohen finished testifying, Trump's legal team again asked for the case to be dismissed, arguing that Cohen was not credible. The judge denied the request on the basis that Cohen was not a key witness and that "There's enough evidence in this case to fill this courtroom."

On October 27, Engoron ruled that Ivanka Trump must testify, pointing out her ties to New York businesses and ownership of some apartments. Engoron stated that Ivanka "has clearly availed herself of the privilege of doing business in New York". The AG has cited Ivanka's continued involvement with the organization, as it pays many of her expenses and proffered her New York apartment for two and a half times less than it was otherwise valued.

==== Week 5 ====
Donald Trump Jr. testified on November 1. He stated that he was not involved in preparing his father's financial statements and that the organization's accountants had worked on the 2017 statement. Donald Jr. stated that he did not recall certain details, including about why in 2021 (after a brief resignment) he was restored to a revocable trust in his father's name and whether Donald Sr. was still a trustee. Donald Jr.'s resumed his testimony on November 2. He said he could recall little about Weisselberg agreeing to a $2 million severance and also that he trusted Weisselberg and Mazars accountants to prepare financial documents. Donald Jr. claimed not to recall a 2017 email he sent a lawyer about his father's Trump Tower penthouse, stating that there was an "[i]nsane amount of stuff there." A week later, Donald Jr. signed a financial document claiming the penthouse to be 30,000 square feet (2,800 m^{2}) and worth $327 million. He upheld his pre-trial testimony that he supported the contents of the statements because he relied on accountants for their veracity "in regards to accounting".

Eric Trump also testified on November 2. Like his brother, he stated that he was not involved with preparing relevant financial statements. He was shown a 2012 email exchange with a representative of a golf course the organization was considering buying, which referred to an in-person meeting to review "a financial statement prepared by a CPA firm reflecting Donald Trump's net worth". Eric said that he was unsure that the document in question was a statement of financial condition. He was also shown evidence that he was involved in reviewing outside appraisals of a Westchester property, despite his earlier testimony that he had not "really" been involved with appraising the property; he said he upheld his earlier testimony before admitting that he was "clearly involved, but to a very small point".

Additionally, on November 2, Ivanka Trump's lawyers requested a stay of Engoron's order for her to testify on November 8—as well as a stay of the entire trial—arguing that Ivanka's scheduled testimony would cause "undue hardship" by interrupting a school week (as she is a mother of three). A higher court denied the request that evening and Ivanka's team withdrew their appeal request the next day.

On November 3, Engoron extended the gag order to Trump's lawyers, citing comments by Habba and Kise in particular as well as numerous threats against his staff.

==== Week 6 ====
Trump testified for four hours on November 6. It would be his final testimony. He responded to some questions in a speechlike manner, prompting the judge to warn him that "This is not a political rally." Trump repeated his already-dismissed claim that disclaimers on financial statements absolved his company. Trump acknowledged that "I would look at them [the financial statements], I would see them, and I would maybe on occasion have some suggestions." He also acknowledged that he might have directed or influenced the valuations for several of the properties in question, possibly including his Trump Tower penthouse; he also admitted that specific valuation was one mistake the organization had made. As he left the courthouse, he told reporters that he had shown that "Everything we did was absolutely right."

In his final ruling, Judge Engoron described Trump's testimony. "Donald Trump rarely responded to the questions asked and he frequently interjected long, irrelevant speeches on issues far beyond the scope of the trial", he wrote. "His refusal to answer the questions directly, or in some cases, at all, severely compromised his credibility.”

Ivanka Trump testified on November 8. According to the AG, Ivanka's testimony corroborated that "she clearly was involved in negotiating and securing ... favorable loans" for the primary defendants and that she financially benefited from fraudulent financial statements. Ivanka stated that she was unable to remember many details, even when presented with her emails; some of these portray her as a key player in (unsuccessfully) trying to secure $50 million from Deutsche Bank for the Trump International Hotel Washington, D.C., in 2016.

The OAG then rested its case, having heard from 25 witnesses.

=== Defense case ===
The defense's case began on November 13, with testimony from Don Jr., who returned to the witness stand as a character witness for the Trump Organization. The defense portion of the trial was expected to last until December 15. Trump spent at least $2.5 million on expert witnesses.

==== Week 7 ====
On November 15, the defense requested a mistrial, saying the judge was biased. The OAG told the court that the request lacked merit.

On November 16, an appellate judge paused the gag order so a full panel of judges could reconsider it at a hearing on November 27. Barely an hour after the order was paused, Trump aide Jason Miller linked to a website attacking the clerk, with Trump soon after posting negative comments to Truth Social about her and Engoron.

==== Week 8 ====
On November 20, Jeff McConney testified that a disclaimer paragraph on Trump’s 2015 financial statement had been written by Mazars. During McConney's cross-examination the next day, the court was shown a note in his handwriting (which he claimed not to remember). It includes the disclaimer paragraph verbatim as well as touting Trump's brand value as affording him "the opportunity to participate in licensing deals around the globe". McConney was also shown the first page of a draft of Trump's 2014 financial statement (which the OAG alleges was exaggerated by $3.5 billion) including a note "DJT TO GET FINAL REVIEW", which McConney admitted to writing. McConney said he believed that Trump typically had final review of all such statements until he became president, and that Eric Trump approved the statements from 2017 onward. McConney stated that he was "very proud" of his work for the organization and that he "gave up" his position because of the company's legal troubles.

On November 22, Engoron's attorney Lisa Evans argued to the appeals court that the gag order should be reimposed. A court system threat-assessment worker stated that the clerk who was the subject of Trump's October 3 post has since been receiving over 50 harassing phone calls, emails, and social media messages a day.

==== Week 9 ====
On November 29, independent monitor Barbara Jones told Engoron that in 2023 the organization transferred $29 million to Donald Trump, which he used to pay taxes, and that another two transfers each exceeded $5 million. The defendants were supposed to report any transfer over $5 million but did not report these. The judge dismissed Trump lawyer Chris Kise's request for a directed verdict (his fourth such request in the trial), hinging on the testimony of a banker from Deutsche Bank that the bank benefitted from their loans to the defendants.

Also on November 29, Trump made a social-media post accusing Engoron's wife of being "Trump Hating". He also accused Engoron's wife and law clerk of having "taken over control of the New York State Witch Hunt Trial".

On November 30, the appeals court reimposed the gag order during the pending appeal. Engoron said he would enforce the gag order "rigorously and vigorously". The order covers Engoron's staff but not his family, and after it was reinstated, Trump continued talking about "the Judge's Wife" on social media.

Also on November 30, Engoron announced that he would not issue a decision in the trial until at least the end of January 2024.

==== Week 10 ====
On December 4, Trump's team asked for permission to appeal the reimposition of the gag order. (On December 10, the OAG asked the appellate division to deny this request.)

Eric Trump was expected to testify on December 6, but this was abruptly canceled.

Donald Trump attended trial on December 7, when expert witness Eli Bartov, an accounting specialist, testified that "there is no evidence whatsoever for any accounting fraud" and "the statements of financial condition were not materially mistaken". He claimed of the nearly tripled valuation of Trump's Manhattan penthouse, "Errors like that are not unusual." Bartov testified on December 8 that he had been paid nearly $900,000 for his testimony (from the organization and the Save America PAC). Another expert witness for the defense was reimbursed almost as much, while a state expert witness with a similar hourly rate made $350,000.

Also on December 7, a New York appeals court agreed to postpone the cancellation of Trump's business certificates until after the trial and related appeals are processed.

==== Week 11 ====
Donald Trump (who last testified on November 6) was expected to testify on December 11, but he announced the night before on Truth Social that he would not. He stated that he had nothing else to say except to repeat his assertion of election interference (purportedly by U.S. President Joe Biden's campaign). On December 12, Trump posted that he had wanted to testify, but that the gag order had deprived him of a constitutional right to defend himself. The defense rested their case later that same day. On December 13, an in-house real-estate broker for the organization testified that Allen Weisselberg gave him the nearly tripled square footage of Trump's triplex; the final testimony in the case was given by an accounting professor called by the OAG to rebut an accounting professor called by Trump's team.

On December 14, the New York appellate division rejected Trump's challenge of the gag order, describing it as "narrow" and that, thus, the "gravity of potential harm is small". (The appeal was dismissed the following month.) Trump's lawyers also announced in mid-December that they were preparing to appeal losses on charges Engoron has yet to rule on, prompting the judge to quip, "You're going to appeal?"

=== Hiatus ===
A monthlong hiatus of in-person hearings was expected following the last week of testimony.

On December 18, 2023, Engoron denied the Trump team's latest request for a directed verdict, saying it was a flawed assumption that the defendants' expert-witness testimony would be accepted as true. Engoron said Eli Bartov in particular had "lost all credibility" by portraying the relevant financial statements as flawless, when the judge had already ruled that they contain "numerous obvious errors". Engoron asserted that as a well-paid witness, Bartov had essentially said what the defendants wanted him to. Engoron also shot down the defendants' repeated argument that valuations are subjective due to using different criteria in different situations, saying, "a lie is still a lie." Trump attorney Chris Kise called this a "rejection of the real facts from the real participants in the real world". Additionally, the judge affirmed that the financial disclaimers "do not shield defendants from liability; if anything, they expose defendants".

A deadline of January 5, 2024, was set for written arguments from both sides. On that day, James argued that Trump should be prevented from conducting real-estate business in New York, and increased the amount of the requested disgorgement to $370 million.

=== Closing arguments and ruling deliberation ===
A few days ahead of closing arguments, Trump expressed interest in personally speaking during the defense's closing argument. On January 10, 2024, Engoron said Trump would be able to speak about "relevant, material facts that are in evidence, and application of the relevant law" but not introduce new evidence, "comment on irrelevant matters", or "deliver a campaign speech". Trump's team objected, so Engoron barred Trump from making closing arguments. Also on January 10, Trump lashed out at the judge on social media, calling him a "Trump hating judge" who was trying to "screw me".

Early the morning of January 11, 2024, when closing arguments were set to take place, a swatting threat was made to Engoron's home, but no bomb was found. Trump appeared in person in court that day, his ninth appearance during the trial. Permitted to speak briefly, he again asserted his innocence and stated, "I'm being persecuted by someone running for office and I think you have to go outside the bounds." Engoron cut him off after about six minutes. A lawyer for Trump novelly claimed that the penalties sought by the AG were unconstitutional. Habba argued that the entire case was James's "agenda", citing the latter's possession of a Starbucks coffee and insisting that her "shoes were off" in court, due to James having slipped one off. The judge said these details were irrelevant but let Habba continue.

On January 23, the AG notified the court of a recent 2nd Circuit ruling in favor of a lifetime ban on Martin Shkreli working in pharmaceuticals as supporting James's requested lifetime ban on Trump working in New York real estate. On January 26, Barbara Jones reported that in her 14 months of monitoring the organization, it had been cooperative and made some requested changes, but the documents it provided were frequently "lacking in completeness and timeliness" and contained inaccuracies. No department in the organization was evidently in charge of avoiding such issues. Additionally, Jones noted that the organization denied the existence of a $48 million loan to Donald Trump, which he claimed in late 2023 to owe to his company. A tax lawyer cited by The Daily Beast said the matter appeared to be evidence of tax evasion. A Trump lawyer argued that Jones's findings about the organization, including "seven immaterial disclosure items, three irrelevant inconsistencies, and five clerical errors", had been trumped up by Jones to justify her fees, reputedly totaling over $2.6 million.

On February 5, Engoron requested details about Allen Weisselberg's plea deal in the criminal case, which suggested that the former CFO may have perjured himself while testifying in the civil case. Engoron said he would consider the ramifications and suggested that if Weisselberg pleaded guilty, it could affect the timing of his decision. (Weisselberg eventually pleaded guilty to perjury, after Engoron had finalized the judgment.)

=== Ruling ===
Initially planned for late January, the ruling came a few weeks later. On February 16, 2024, Engoron found that: "In order to borrow more and at lower rates, defendants submitted blatantly false financial data to the accountants, resulting in fraudulent financial statements." Engoron found that during the trial, "defendants' fact and expert witnesses simply denied reality, and defendants failed to accept responsibility or to impose internal controls to prevent future recurrences." Engoron ruled that the defendants had been "incapable of admitting the error of their ways", and that their "complete lack of contrition and remorse borders on pathological".

In his ruling, Engoron dismissed various defenses. Engoron found that moneylenders issued loans while relying on false financial statements, contrary to the defense's claim that they did not. When the defendants blamed third-party accounting companies, Engoron found "overwhelming evidence" produced during the trial that the accounting companies "relied on the Trump Organization, not vice versa, to be truthful and accurate, and they had a right to do so". When the defendants claimed that differences in monetary evaluations were inherent and not fraudulent in appraising, Engoron wrote that "the science part [of appraising] cannot be fraudulent. When two appraisals rely on starkly different assumptions, that is not evidence of a difference of opinion, that is evidence of deceit."

==== Commentary about Ivanka Trump ====
In his ruling, Engoron generally found most of the witnesses called by the defense either irrelevant or not very reliable. He also stated that Ivanka Trump (who had been dismissed as a defendant in the case due to a statute of limitations but was called as a witness) gave a clear testimony, but her inability to remember key details about negotiating loans while testifying for the prosecution was "suspect", given that she "vividly recalled details" when cross-examined by the defense.

==== Disgorgement and interest ====
On February 16, in his proposed judgment, Engoron ruled that Donald Trump and his companies were liable to pay $354.8 million of disgorgement of ill-gotten gains, plus interest (the amount of which he established a week later when he finalized the judgment). The total amount owed by Trump and his companies:

- $168 million of interest saved from favorable loans based on the false financial statements
- $126 million of profits from the sale of the Old Post Office based on false financial statements
- $60 million of profits from the sale of Ferry Point golf course in New York
- $100 million (approximately) in interest as of the time of the judgment, to continue increasing until paid

Other defendants additionally owed:

- $4 million of profits from the Old Post Office sale, to be paid by Donald Trump Jr.
- $4 million of profits from the Old Post Office sale, to be paid by Eric Trump
- $1 million from compensation gained by Allen Weisselberg when he left the Trump Organization, to be paid by Weisselberg

==== Restriction on business activity ====
Engoron also banned Donald Trump, Allen Weisselberg, and Jeffrey McConney from leading any New York companies or organizations for three years, while Eric Trump and Donald Trump Jr. received a similar ban for two years; Weisselberg and McConney were permanently banned from "financial control" of any New York company. Engoron decided not to dissolve the businesses, but ruled that an independent director of compliance must be installed to oversee financial reporting at the organization, while independent monitor Barbara Jones was instructed to continue in her role for at least three years.

==== Effective date ====
Over email correspondence on February 21 and 22, Trump's team asked Engoron to delay enforcement of the judgment. The judge denied this, saying Trump's lawyers had "failed to explain ... any basis for a stay", and that he would instead sign the judgment and send it to the court clerk for further processing. On February 23, Engoron finalized the judgment. Trump had 30 days to appeal, for which he would first need to pay cash or post bond for the $454 million. On April 1, Trump posted bond for a smaller amount, which the court accepted.

==== Enforcement ====
Though Trump had claimed in his April 2023 deposition that he had "substantially in excess of 400 million in cash" and that this amount was "going up very substantially", it was not known whether he in fact had enough available cash to pay the judgment. On February 20, 2024, James said she would consider asking a judge to enforce the seizure of Trump's assets "if he does not have funds to pay off the judgment". This would be ordinarily be administered by the New York City sheriff or via a judgment lien.

As of December 2024, the court had not decided on his appeal, and thus payment was not yet enforced.

== Bond payment ==
Trump was required to post security (e.g. a bond, requiring collateral) within a 30-day period including 9% in annual interest for the appeal to be taken on. The timely posting of security for the judgment would automatically stay its collection pending appeal. On February 28, 2024, Trump asked the court to delay this financial obligation. His lawyers wrote that it would be "impossible to secure and post a complete bond" of $464 million, but that Trump could secure a $100 million bond. On February 28, appeals judge Anil Singh rejected the request for a lower bond amount, but stayed bans on Trump and other defendants taking out bank loans or serving as an officer of companies in New York.

On March 6, 2024, the New York attorney general's office filed judgments in Westchester County, suggesting it may plan to seize Trump National Golf Club Westchester in Briarcliff Manor, as well as Trump's Seven Springs estate in Bedford.

On March 11, the OAG argued that Trump should be required to post a bond in the ordinary full amount. The OAG argued that the defendants had not proven that it would currently be "impossible" to post a full bond without selling properties and also that they had not shown that Trump's liquid assets would be enough to satisfy the judgment after the appeal. The OAG complained that defendants (having previously told the court that the secret disposal or movement of its assets could not be carried out) had recently made an unsuccessful attempt to change the address of several major entities—including the organization's ownership—to Florida. On March 18, the deadline for the defendants' appeal merit brief, Trump's lawyers argued that securing a bond in the judgment's full amount was "a practical impossibility", after about 30 companies declined to back one. On March 20, the OAG again argued that the full bond should be provided, saying it could be divided into multiple sureties.

Trump amplified invocations of the case in his political fundraising while also claiming that he already had cash. On March 22, he claimed that he had "almost five hundred million dollars in cash" largely intended for political use and that Engoron was somehow knowingly targeting these funds. Trump was simultaneously anticipating a multibillion-dollar profit from Truth Social's merger with Digital World Acquisition Corp. Despite these assets, Trump indicated that he did not intend to "give money" to the court and that he would fight the case "all the way up to the U.S. Supreme Court if necessary".

On March 25, when the bond was due, a panel of state appellate division judges gave Trump an additional 10 days to post a reduced bond of $175 million. The court also stayed the ban on Trump serving as a public officer of a company and the bans on Weisselberg, McConney, Donald Trump Jr. and Eric Trump. However, the court denied Trump's request to block the trial court's order for an independent monitor to oversee the organization and the creation of a compliance director for the business.

Trump posted the reduced bond on April 1. It was underwritten by Knight Specialty Insurance Company (KSIC), Los Angeles, and backed by KSIC's parent company, which is chaired by Don Hankey and based in the Cayman Islands. Cash for the full amount of the bond was being held as collateral by the Charles Schwab Corporation (acting as a broker) in an account pledged to KSIC. Because KSIC is not admitted as an insurer in New York, on April 4 the AG requested further information. Trump's lawyers said KSIC could gain control of the cash with two days notice, implying that their client still controlled it. There was no evidence of the customary irrevocable letter of credit limiting the cash to bond use. On April 19, the AG cited such improprieties in a request for the judge to require a new bond be secured within seven days, also arguing that KSIC's total policyholder surplus was $138 million, restricting its single-risk limitation of loss to $13.8 million, below the bond value. During a hearing on April 22, the court ruled that the bond from KSIC would stand, with amendments to ensure the cash would not be used for other purposes.

== Appeal of verdict ==
On February 26, 2024, Donald Trump, his adult sons, and two former Trump Organization officials filed a notice of appeal to the New York State Supreme Court, Appellate Division, First Department. Trump's lawyers questioned whether Engoron "committed errors of law and/or fact" and whether he "acted in excess" of his jurisdiction.

On July 22, the defendants filed the full appeal. It asserts that the closing dates for seven of the ten loans cited in the judgment should have qualified them for protection under the statute of limitations, and that a tolling agreement did not apply to Trump personally, only his businesses. Additionally, the appeal argues that an eighth loan was not consummated, purportedly leaving only loans for 40 Wall Street and the Old Post Office building as prosecutable (i.e. making only $113 of the $464 million judgment valid).

On June 20, Trump's lawyers complained that Engoron should not have spoken to New York real-estate lawyer Adam Bailey before issuing his judgment. They requested that Engoron recuse himself or else they would seek an evidentiary hearing about the "prohibited communications" with Bailey. On July 9, Engoron narrowed the defense's subpoena of Bailey to relevant statements, with a one-week deadline for Bailey to surrender any relevant documents. On July 25, Engoron announced that he would not recuse himself. He explained that Bailey had "accosted" the judge and ranted to him about the case for about 90 seconds, which Engoron said he "did not initiate ... engage in, or learn from", further stating, "I did not base any part of any of my rulings on it, as Bailey has outlandishly, mistakenly, and defamatorily claimed."

On August 21, James argued in favor of upholding the judgment, describing many of Trump's legal defenses as frivolous in nature.

On September 26, an appeal hearing was held. The five-judge panel raised the fact that Deutsche Bank said it largely benefitted from the transactions, prompting a state deputy solicitor general to argue that the large penalty was appropriate because it protects honest businesses uninvolved with the alleged scheme. A lawyer for Trump cited the statute of limitations, prompting the panel to defend the AG's responsibility to prosecute "persistent" and "repeated" fraud, suggesting that this might not be protected by the statute. In November 2024, Trump's lawyers asked the AG to voluntarily dismiss both the case and judgment due to Trump's win in the 2024 election, claiming that the litigation would interfere with his executive duties. The AG refused, arguing that waiting for the appellate court's decision would not impede presidential activity.

On August 21, 2025, the appeals court upheld Trump's liability but voided the penalty as excessive. The judges wrote that "While the injunctive relief ordered by the court is well crafted to curb defendants' business culture, the court's disgorgement order, which directs that defendants pay nearly half a billion dollars to the State of New York, is an excessive fine that violates the Eighth Amendment".

On September 4, 2025 James appealed the decision to toss the penalty in the New York Court of Appeals.

== 2025 indictment of Letitia James ==
In early August 2025 (during the second Trump presidency), the Department of Justice subpoenaed the AG's office, reportedly on the basis that James's investigation might have violated Trump's civil rights.

By May 2025, a grand jury was empaneled to investigate James after Trump officials alleged that she had falsified paperwork for some of her properties. As of September 2025, the strength of the case had reportedly been doubted by some prosecutors, one of whom was dismissed. On October 9, interim U.S. Attorney for the Eastern District of Virginia Lindsey Halligan (a Trump nominee) argued before the jury that James committed mortgage fraud. The same day, the jury indicted James on charges of bank fraud and making false statements. On October 24, James pleaded not guilty, asserting that Trump had lodged the allegations as a part of a revenge effort. A month later, a judge dismissed the case, ruling that Halligan had been unlawfully appointed.

In December 2025, a grand jury reportedly declined a second and third attempt to indict James on similar charges.

== Reactions ==
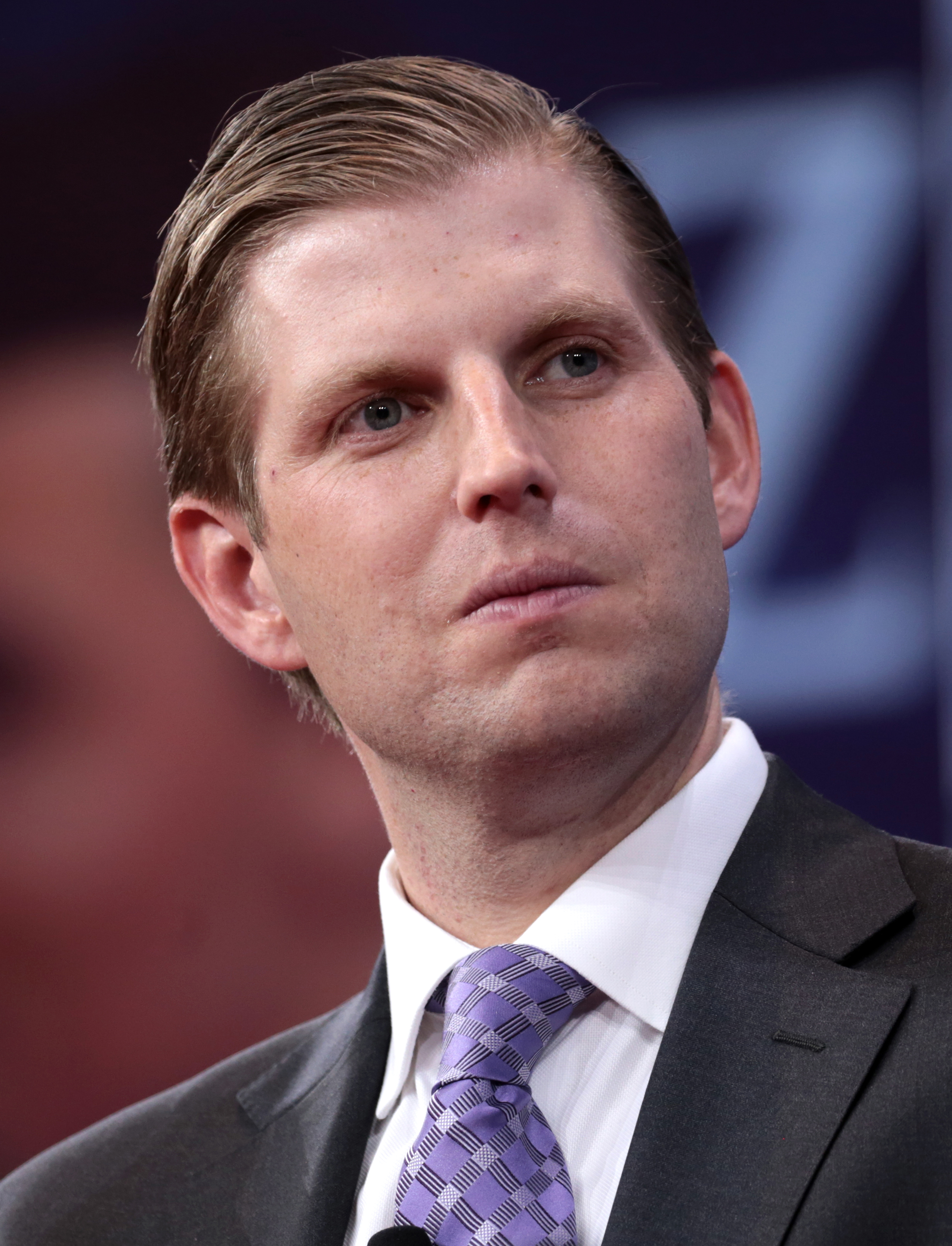
Trump's third child, Eric

In mid-2021, the Republican National Committee (RNC) agreed to financially support Trump's legal defense in both New York inquiries (the civil inquiry led by James and the criminal inquiry against the Trump Organization led by Manhattan DA Cyrus Vance Jr.). In October, the RNC paid $121,670 to a law firm employed by Trump. The next month, a Republican (GOP) spokesperson called Trump "a leader of our party [whose] record of achievement is critical to the GOP" and referred to the investigations as a "never ending witch hunt" by Democrats. In December, it was reported that the RNC had agreed to pay up to $1.6 million of Trump's legal expenses for both cases. Some sources have pointed out that the matters being investigated took place prior to Trump becoming president. Speaking to Hannity on Fox News in February 2022, Eric Trump argued that the investigations were only being conducted because his father was "clearly the frontrunner for 2024". The RNC indicated that it would cut off legal funding for Trump as required if he officially announced his candidacy. (Note: Trump officially announced his candidacy on November 15, 2022.)

On January 20, 2022, Axios reported that some of Trump's associates have expressed concern with his choice of lawyer in his dispute with the New York AG. Alina Habba of New Jersey has represented Trump in his lawsuit against his niece and in alleged sexual misconduct cases involving E. Jean Carroll and Summer Zervos. According to some of his associates, Trump has a pattern of hiring lawyers to take on cases that are not designed to be won so much as draw publicity. One source close to Trump stated that he had "fallen prey to inexperienced lawyers who are just telling him what he wants to hear", while Eric Trump defended Habba as "incredibly competent". A top Washington D.C. lawyer called Habba's legal motions against James "a huge stretch", but acknowledged: "Prosecutors are supposed to be above politics and just about the facts. When they sound more like politicians, they can get in real trouble with judges." In March, The Daily Beast reported that most of the Trump family's legal team detested Habba's work, causing the organization (via Eric Trump) to again call her "incredibly competent". (Note: On August 24, the New York City Bar Association called on lawyers including Habba to "refrain from making knowingly false or misleading statements" regarding the FBI search of Mar-a-Lago.)

In early October 2022, a former Manhattan prosecutor called the financial statement disclaimers provided by Mazars "a hurdle" in the civil case, while a former AG lawyer argued that they protect Trump. Reuters pointed out that some commentators have viewed James's lawsuit as a significant threat to Trump, but it may take years for the proceedings to unfold and it may be difficult to prove fraud; institutions such as Deutsche Bank could have suspected that Trump's statements were exaggerated and accepted the risk, calculating that it would benefit from this. A Curbed article about the state of Trump's real-estate empire in New York City concludes that "In effect, his footprint in New York has already been shrinking for years, and James's lawsuit, while it may never come to fruition, has already laid that bare." Michael Cohen predicted that the lawsuit would "financially destroy" Trump and lead to his being perp walked. Satirical media outlet The Onion joked that Trump had changed his name to Donald Trump 2 to evade the lawsuit.

In early November 2022, The New York Times reported that some of Trump's own lawyers opposed the lawsuit filed on his behalf in Florida, believing it unlikely to succeed; the organization's general counsel reportedly warned that it may constitute malpractice. A Florida law firm partner was quoted as saying, "This, certainly on its face, appears to be objectively frivolous. I'm aware of no authority that allows a state court in Florida to enjoin or otherwise interfere with a law enforcement investigation being conducted by New York state authorities."

Ahead of the 2022 midterm elections, Fox News published an Associated Press article about James's re-election campaign, describing her in the headline as "Donald Trump's chief legal nemeses [sic]". (Note: The AP article, originally describing the AG in the headline as "a Thorn in Trump's Side", only refers to her as "one of ... Trump's chief legal nemeses".)

On November 16, 2022, a New York appeals court ruled that Cohen could sue the organization to reimburse legal fees (in the range of millions of dollars) for Trump-related litigation including the investigations by the DA and AG. The lawsuit was settled in July 2023 under terms that were not disclosed.

On February 1, 2023, Cohen speculated that the civil case would ultimately result in $700 million in judgments against Trump.

On February 22, Forbes reported that "new revelations about Trump Tower suggest that the building is—and always was—something of a fraud." (Note: In a statement to Forbes, a spokesperson for the organization called the AG's case an "overreach" regarding private loans which had been repaid.) The article cites:

- "Property records [showing] that [Trump] has been lying about the financial performance of the building since it first opened in 1983";
- financial documents indicating that "Trump lied about the square footage of the office and retail space at the base of the property" (separate from the inflation of his penthouse);
- "Portions of a [newly released] 2015 audio recording [which] prove that Trump was personally involved in the efforts to lie about the value of Trump Tower's commercial space".

After Ivanka Trump requested a delay to prepare her defense, some media outlets speculated that she had decided to stop protecting family members allegedly involved in fraudulent activity.

After the transcript of Trump's April 2023 deposition was made public, Cohen and some media outlets accused him of turning on his son Eric by indicating that the younger Trump was more responsible for the organization's affairs in recent years than he was.

On the first day of the trial, a former Manhattan assistant DA compared Trump's attacks on the judge to the behavior of a "cornered raccoon". On the last day, a former New York State AG said that Trump's concluding attacks on the judge were "the kind of thing that someone would do if they were a criminal defendant with mental health problems".

In October 2023, Associated Press reported that multiple real estate experts had said that Mar-a-Lago could be privately sold for far more than the $18 million to $37 million range that it was valued at during tax assessments, where it was taxed as a private club and not as a home. Associated Press cited one expert who said that it could be privately sold for at least $300 million, and another who said it could be privately sold for at least $600 million. The same Associated Press article also stated, "The much smaller Palm Beach compound once owned by the Kennedy political dynasty sold for $70 million three years ago." Properties with a deed restriction like Mar-a-Lago are appraised on the basis of their annual net operating income, rather than their resale value or reconstruction cost. Trump had converted the property from a private home to a private club in 1995, which created significant tax advantages for him, though it would also reduce the number of potential future buyers by placing preservation requirements on the property in perpetuity.

On February 13, 2024, House Republican Conference Chair Elise Stefanik filed a bar complaint against the AG, alleging she broke the Rules of Professional Conduct "by conducting a biased investigation and prosecution of President Trump".

At an April 2, 2024 campaign stop, Trump falsely claimed that he had "won the case, because it's called statute of limitations", further saying that Engoron was a "rogue" and "fake judge" who was ignorant of his victory.

== See also ==
- Legal affairs of Donald Trump
- List of lawsuits involving Donald Trump
