= Wealth of Donald Trump =

Wealth of President of the United States

The net worth of Donald Trump, the 45th and 47th president of the United States, is not publicly known. For decades, Forbes has assessed his wealth, currently estimating it at $6.9 billion as of September 2026. Bloomberg estimated his wealth at $7.08 billion in January 2025.

He received gifts, loans, and inheritance from his father, Fred Trump, who was a real-estate developer and businessman. Donald Trump's primary business has been real estate ventures, including hotels, casinos, and golf courses. He also made money from Trump-branded products including neckties, steaks, and urine tests. Money received through political fundraisers is used to pay for guest stays at properties owned by the Trump Organization and to pay his and his allies' lawyers.

During his second presidency, Trump has enriched himself considerably, including through foreign business deals. After the early 2025 launch of $Trump, Trump's own cryptocurrency, Axios temporarily estimated his net worth to be $58 billion. On his conflicts of interest and business dealings while in office, Trump said, "I found out that nobody cared, and I’m allowed to."

== Gifts, loans, and other wealth from his father ==
Drawing upon more than 100,000 pages of tax returns and financial records from Fred Trump's businesses and interviews with former advisers and employees, the New York Times found 295 distinct streams of revenue that Fred Trump created over five decades in order to channel his wealth to his son.

In a 2007 sworn deposition, Donald Trump acknowledged borrowing $9.6 million from his father's estate, and on the presidential campaign trail in 2015, he admitted to borrowing $1 million from his father as a young adult.

=== Trust funds ===
Trump is the beneficiary of several trust funds set up by his father and paternal grandmother, which began in 1949 when he was three. According to The New York Times, he "was a millionaire by age 8." In 1976, Fred Trump set up trust funds of $1 million ($5.7 million in 2025 dollars) for each of his five children and three grandchildren. Donald Trump received $90,000 in 1980 and $214,605 in 1981 through the fund.

=== Tax fraud ===
For four years, Fred Trump held shares in the Trump Palace condos, and in 1991, he sold them to his son well below their purchase price, masking what could be considered a hidden donation and giving him the benefit of a tax write-off. Fred Trump died in 1999. In 2018, when the matter came to light, the New York State tax department and New York City officials said they would investigate.

The court found that Donald Trump had for years committed fraud against banks, insurers, and others by exaggerating his net worth and significantly overvaluing assets in documents used to make deals and secure financing. The fraud included two of his residences: his apartment in Trump Tower (the statements claimed it was roughly triple its true size and value) and Mar-a-Lago (the statements inflated its value by approximately 22 times). (Note: In his summary judgment, Engoron noted that between 2011 and 2021, the assessor of Palm Beach County valued Mar-a-Lago between $18 million and $27.6 million. In 2020, the organization valued it at $27 million, but in other instances valued it between $426.5 million and $612 million. At trial, Trump asserted that "the house" was actually worth between $750 million and $1.5 billion (i.e. at least 27 times the 2020 valuation). Mar-a-Lago is "deed restricted" such that it cannot be used for any purpose other than as a private club. Consequently, appraisers value the property based on its annual net operating income rather than the resale or reconstruction value as a home, as would be the case for an unrestricted property.) In 2024, Trump was found liable for $355 million in disgorgement and roughly $100 million in interest. His oldest two sons (Donald Trump Jr. and Eric Trump) were ordered to pay $4 million each, while Allen Weisselberg was ordered to pay $1 million. After the decision, interest continued to accrue. As Donald Trump did not pay the judgment while he appealed the decision, by the end of 2024, the total he owed had increased to over $500 million.

=== Inheritance ===
In 1993, when Trump took two loans totaling $30 million from his siblings, their anticipated shares of Fred's estate amounted to $35 million each. Upon Fred Trump's death in 1999, his will divided $20 million (after taxes) among his surviving children.

== Pre-presidency ==
=== Lawsuits ===
From the 1970s until he was elected president in 2016, Donald Trump and his businesses were involved in over 4,000 legal cases in U.S. federal and state courts, including battles with casino patrons, million-dollar real estate lawsuits, personal defamation lawsuits, and over 100 business tax disputes. At least 25 women accused him of sexual harassment or sexual assault.

=== Real estate ===
In 2015, in Manhattan, Trump's name was displayed on 17 buildings, plus Wollman Rink, and, in the Bronx, his name was on the Trump Golf Links golf course. Where his name appears on a building, it does not necessarily mean he owns the building; it represents his ownership of a unit within the building, a licensing agreement or condition of sale, or property management by the Trump Organization.

=== The Apprentice ===
From his television show The Apprentice and related licensing and endorsements, Trump received $427.4 million from the show's beginning in 2004 through 2018.

Due largely to income received from the show, he paid a combined $70.1 million in federal taxes in 2005, 2006, and 2007. He paid no taxes in 2008. When he filed taxes in 2009, he declared over $700 million in business losses and, on that basis, he asked for a refund of his federal income taxes paid in 2005–2007. He was eventually refunded the $70.1 million plus over $2.7 million in interest. As of 2020, auditors were still considering the matter. If he is asked to return that federal refund, then, considering added interest and penalties, he may owe over $100 million to the federal government.

The New York Times said: "He also received $21.2 million in state and local refunds, which often piggyback on federal filings," and he may be obligated to return those refunds, too.

=== Foundation ===
Trump formed his charitable foundation in 1988. In the first decade of the 2000s, he gave away $2.8 million through the foundation (though he had pledged three times that amount). He stopped personally contributing to the foundation in 2008, though he accepted donations from others. In 2018, the foundation agreed to shut down. It was facing a civil lawsuit by the New York attorney general (AG) that alleged "persistently illegal conduct" including self-dealing and funneling campaign contributions. Furthermore, it had never been properly certified in New York and did not submit to the annual audit that would have been required. In November 2019, Trump was ordered to pay a $2 million settlement for misusing the foundation for his business and political purposes.

== First presidency ==
"I became President because of the brand...I think it's the hottest brand in the world," Trump testified in April 2023 in the New York civil investigation. He suggested that the "brand value" of the U.S. presidency had been worth to him "maybe $10 billion or something."

During his presidency, Trump reported over $1.6 billion of outside revenue and income from his companies, including the Trump Organization. "While Trump publicly took credit for donating his taxpayer-funded salary," Citizens for Responsibility and Ethics in Washington noted that the presidential salary he donated was not even one-thousandth of what he was earning as a businessman.

Nonetheless, the Forbes estimate of his wealth decreased from $3.7 billion just before he took office to $2.5 billion when he left it.

Five months into his presidency, the Trump Organization paid off a loan to L/P Daewoo, a company with ties to North Korea. During the campaign, the debt of nearly $20 million had not been mentioned in the Trump campaign's financial disclosure filings.

Political donations from small and large donors alike ended up funding Trump's personal businesses. During his presidency, his businesses received $8.5 million from political fundraising under his control, including the Trump campaign, and $2 million from other Republican fundraising sources.

Though the Trump Organization claimed it would let federal employees who traveled with President Trump stay at his properties “for free” or “at cost”, it charged the Secret Service up to $1,185 per night, generating over $1.4 million in Secret Service lodging expenses over four years. This bill is charged to taxpayers and paid to the Trump Organization.

During the first two years of his term, the governments of China, Turkey, Malaysia, Saudi Arabia, Qatar, and the United Arab Emirates spent a combined total of over $700,000 at the Trump International Hotel in Washington, D.C.

For federal income taxes, Trump paid $750 in 2017, a combined $1.1 million in 2018 and 2019 (when his taxable income was nearly $23 million and nearly $3 million respectively), and nothing in 2020 (when he reported a loss of over $16 million).

The January 2024 report released by the Democratic members of the House Oversight Committee detailing over $7.8 million in payments made by foreign governments to Donald Trump during his presidency

On March 17, 2023, Washington, D.C. representative Jamie Raskin, Ranking Member of the Committee on Oversight and Accountability, released a report on Donald Trump. Trump and his family members were accused of failing to publicly provide details about more than 100 foreign gifts he received. Some records disclosed that Saudi Arabia's crown prince Mohammad bin Salman provided 16 unreported gifts worth more than $45,000 to Trump, including swords and daggers. Japanese Prime Minister Shinzo Abe gifted Golden Golf Clubs to Trump. India provided 17 gifts, with an estimated value of $47,000.

On January 3, 2024, Raskin and House Oversight Committee Democrats released a report showing that Trump's businesses had received $7.8 million in payments from foreign governments during his presidency. On January 10, during a Fox News town hall, Trump admitted that foreign governments had paid him for hotel stays. "I was doing services for that," Trump said. Raskin demanded that Trump return all money received to the U.S. Treasury.

Because the ruling in the New York civil case banned him from “borrowing from New York-chartered banks until 2027,” the Financial Times wrote in February 2024, “this sharply raises the leverage of potential lenders in the Gulf and elsewhere.”

=== 2016 financial disclosure ===
The 98-page disclosure for 2016 shows that his holdings were least $1.5 billion. During that year, he held numerous stocks, including Amazon, Exxon Mobil, Goldman Sachs, Microsoft, Toyota and others.

=== 2017 financial disclosure ===
The disclosure for 2017 showed that Trump had completely reimbursed his former personal lawyer Michael Cohen in the amount of between $100,001 and $250,000.

Trump also earned $40 million from a Washington, D.C. hotel owned by his company. In response, Senator Richard Blumenthal (D-Conn.) and others in congress filed a lawsuit on the basis that Trump had violated the emoluments clause, which states that it is illegal to profit from a foreign state. It was argued that Trump profited then lobbyists or government officials from Kuwait, Saudi Arabia, and Malaysia used the hotel.

== Between presidencies ==
=== Loans and accounting ===
After Trump lost the 2020 election, Deutsche Bank senior banker Rosemary Vrablic announced on December 22, 2020, that she was resigning from the bank, effective December 31. The reasons for her resignation were unknown, but the New York Times provided context: In 2011, Vrablic had taken Trump as a client and loaned him $300 million, although this was controversial within the bank, especially as Trump had defaulted on a large loan they'd given him just three years earlier. She also engaged in personal business transactions with Trump. It was expected that Deutsche Bank employees would be asked to testify before a grand jury in the criminal investigations of the Manhattan DA.

In February 2022, Trump's longtime accounting firm, Mazars, said it no longer trusted his information and would no longer serve as his accountant. Nonetheless, that month, Axos Bank loaned Trump $100 million on Trump Tower at 4.25 percent for 10 years. In May 2022, it loaned him $125 million on his Doral golf resort at 4.9 percent for 10 years. Axos CEO Gregory Garrabrants authorized both loans.

Trump's 2024 assets were valued at $1.6 billion or more, and his income that year was over $600 million. Income sources included crypto, golf clubs, and licensing. This was revealed in a public financial disclosure on June 13, 2025.

In August 2025, the anti-corruption group Accountable.US estimated that he might have "about $11.6 billion in uncounted crypto assets", forming three-quarters of his total wealth.

=== Business relationships ===
Following the storming of the U.S. Capitol on January 6, 2021, Trump suddenly lost a number of platforms and relationships, including Twitter, Facebook, Stripe, Shopify, and a PGA Championship that was to be held at one of his golf courses. Deutsche Bank said it would no longer do business with Trump, while Signature Bank (an American company) not only began closing his accounts but also called for him to resign the presidency. New York City revoked its contracts with the Trump Organization, which include ice skating rinks and a carousel at Central Park and the Trump Golf Links at the Ferry Point golf course in the Bronx, for which it had been paying the Trump Organization $17 million per year. (Two years later, the Trump Organization sold the rights to the golf course to Bally's Corporation.) The real estate firm Cushman & Wakefield said it would no longer handle leasing for Trump Tower or 40 Wall Street.

As Trump's presidency ended, a number of Mar-a-Lago members were quietly abandoning their paying memberships, according to journalist Laurence Leamer, who had written a book about the resort two years previously. In March 2021, the beach club and dining room were temporarily shut down after staff were diagnosed with COVID-19. In early 2021, after leaving the presidency, Trump was working out of Mar-a-Lago, where he converted a bridal suite into an office.

On May 11, 2022, the Trump Organization sold its lease of the Old Post Office in Washington, D.C. for a $100 million profit, and he paid off his $170 million Deutsche Bank loan with the proceeds. Axos Bank was involved during the last two months of the deal and financed part of a loan he needed to complete it. Earlier that year, the House Oversight Committee had tried to prevent Trump from selling, arguing that he had given the U.S. General Services Administration (GSA) "at least one financial statement with possible material misrepresentations" and should not be "rewarded" for "seeking to profit off the presidency." He ran the Trump International Hotel from 2016 to 2022 out of the Old Post Office, where the GSA gave him a 60-year lease in 2013.

In January 2025, days before Trump's second inauguration, an Abu Dhabi royal family agreed to purchase a 49% stake in his cryptocurrency company, World Liberty Financial, for $500 million. They paid half up front. The deal was kept secret for a year.

=== Airplane ===
Two months after Biden's inauguration, it was reported that Trump's personal Boeing 757 was in need of repairs and that it had not flown since his presidential term ended.

=== Merchandise ===
In November 2021, Trump released a coffee table book titled Our Journey Together, which was sold for $75 per copy and had gross sales of $20 million within two months. The book used public domain images taken by taxpayer-funded White House photographers.

In 2023, Trump made $7.2 million through a licensing deal to sell Trump NFT "trading cards."

In 2024, he sold Trump-themed "God Bless the USA" Bibles (printed in China for less than $3 each, retailing for $59.99 and up, some touting the July 13th attempt on his life as "the day God intervened"), two other books, golden sneakers, silver "Trump Coins" (with his face imprinted on one side and the White House on the other), and "Trump Watches" (most of which retail for $499, with one priced at $100,000).

=== Fundraising ===
A number of large companies halted their political contributions to Trump after the storming of the Capitol, and, coincidentally, Trump's largest political donor, Sheldon Adelson, died on January 11, 2021. Overall, however, Trump raised more funds than others. In April 2021, a Trump adviser claimed that Trump's available political funds ($85 million) roughly equalled the RNC's ($84 million). At the end of January 2022, the Save America PAC had $108 million, more than double what the Republican National Committee had.

From 2015 through the first half of 2024, political groups spent $35 million at Trump properties, over 80 percent of which was spent by groups backing Trump specifically. Some of this activity was post-presidency. Over less than two years – 2021 (after he left office) and 2022 – his political committees spent over $900,000 at his properties, according to Federal Election Commission filings analyzed by the HuffPost. This spending increased in 2023 and 2024.

In April 2024, a new fundraising committee, Trump 47, filed its first FEC report, revealing that 20 people had contributed at least $800,000 each.

==== Save America PAC ====
After losing the November 2020 election, Trump formed a leadership political action committee (leadership PAC) called "Save America". Beginning the day after the election and continuing until the vote certification on January 6, 2021, Trump's mass emails to his supporters asked for small-dollar contributions to the "Official Election Defense Fund," which did not exist; all the funds raised went to Save America. According to filings with the Federal Election Commission, the PAC had raised $31 million by the end of 2020 and $255.4 million by the end of January 2021.

"Save America" is also entitled to $45 million from the Trump Make America Great Again Committee, which raised those funds together with the Republican National Committee (RNC). While Trump had claimed the money would go toward challenging his own 2020 election loss and supporting Republicans in the Georgia Senate runoff election, the money was not used for these purposes. By mid-2022, 69 Trump allies had received $350,000 from Save America. Some of it was also spent at Trump Organization properties. In September 2022, it was reported that the Save America PAC had advanced $3 million to lawyer Chris Kise to defend Trump in the Justice Department probe of the presidential records seized at Mar-a-Lago.

A Trump fundraising email on March 8, 2021, told donors that their money should go to the Save America PAC rather than to "RINOs" (“Republicans in name only"). As of March 2021, Trump's website said that 90% of new donations would go to the Save America PAC and the remainder to the Make America Great Again (MAGA) PAC, a new entity he created on February 27, 2021, with the remaining $8 million from the former Donald J. Trump For President campaign committee. He made his first in-person fundraising request in a public setting on February 28 at the Conservative Political Action Conference. In mid-2021, it was anticipated that Trump would encounter difficulty maintaining his donor lists, given that Facebook was still not allowing him to use its platform.

The Save America PAC raised around $75 million during the first half of 2021. Though some was spent on Trump's travel costs, legal costs, and staff costs, none was spent on ballot reviews of the 2020 election, despite advertisements for donors to "join the fight to secure our elections". By the end of June 2021, the Save America PAC had paid over $200,000 to a legal firm associated with Trump's interactions with the House Select Committee on the January 6 Attack while paying nothing for the defense of hundreds of Trump supporters facing charges related to January 6. At that time, the Save America PAC and MAGA PAC combined had nearly $102 million in cash reserves. In October 2021, the RNC paid Trump's attorneys over $121,000 to address what the RNC claimed were "politically motivated legal proceedings waged against President Trump".

The Save America PAC donated nothing to other candidates in January 2022. Through February 2022, it gave $205,000 to 41 federal candidates and $145,500 to 29 state candidates while sitting on over $110 million. It had over $99 million in cash at the end of July 2022 and $93 million at the end of August 2022. In October 2022, it transferred $60 million to the Make America Great Again Inc. super PAC (which also took in millions of dollars from other sources). The MAGA Inc. super PAC spent only $15 million on Republican Senate candidates in the November 2022 midterm elections; with $54 million remaining, it said its new goal was to reelect Trump in 2024.

In the third quarter of 2022, Trump spent $22 million to fundraise $24 million.

In 2022, the Save America PAC paid over $120,000 to the Brand Woodward Law firm, paying legal bills for Kash Patel and Walt Nauta, both of whom testified regarding the government documents Trump took to Mar-a-Lago.

In 2023, about 10 percent of Trump's political fundraising was sent to the Save America PAC whose primary expense was his legal bills. That year, multiple Trump PACs spent a total of roughly $50 million of donor funds on Trump's legal bills. Most of the funds came from small-dollar donors.

By late 2024, Save America had paid a total of over $90 million to attorneys working on his cases.

==== Republican National Committee funds ====
Between October 2021 and July 2022, the RNC paid nearly $2 million to Trump's lawyers. In July 2022, the RNC warned it would stop these payments if Trump declared a bid in the 2024 election, on the grounds that it doesn't take sides in a presidential primary.

In early 2024, former RNC chair Michael Steele, as well as current and former RNC members, expressed concern that Trump would try to leverage RNC funds to pay the judgments against him in the E. Jean Carroll case and the New York civil investigation of the Trump Organization.

On February 26, 2024, Ronna McDaniel announced she would resign as RNC chair according to Trump's wishes. On March 8, Lara Trump was elected RNC co-chair by unanimous vote. An RNC fundraising dinner planned for April 6, 2024 will direct funds to the Save America PAC, which pays Donald Trump's legal bills.

==== Donor refunds ====
In September and October 2020, the for-profit donation processor WinRed presented recurring donations as the default option, a feature that was revealed in the fine print. From mid-October 2020 to the end of 2020, the Trump campaign and the RNC refunded over $64 million to online donors who had complained they had only meant to make one-time contributions. During the first half of 2021, another $12.8 million was refunded.

==== Investigations ====
In September 2022, the Justice Department issued a grand jury subpoena to the Save America PAC. Subpoenas were also served to former Trump aides Stephen Miller and Brian Jack.

== Second presidency ==
Following the UAE's $500 million investment in World Liberty Financial cryptocurrency just before the inauguration, Trump made an additional $1.4 billion off the presidency during his first year back in office. Most of this was from other cryptocurrency, while $90 million was from settling lawsuits with tech and media companies. Trump claimed a similar figure, as, on August 27, 2025, he announced on Truth Social that he had "raised, since the Great Presidential Election of 2024, in various forms and political entities, in excess of 1.5 Billion Dollars."

He made over 21,000 securities trades in 2025, with a total value around $600 million–$1.86 billion.

In September 2026, about 6 in 10 U.S. adults believed that Trump was profiting in ways that were either unethical or illegal, according to a survey conducted by the Associated Press-NORC Center for Public Affairs Research.

=== Cryptocurrency ===
After a brief initial rise, the price of the $Trump meme coin declined.

The market price of World Liberty's WLFI token has declined since becoming publicly traded, though a Trump business entity collected a 75% cut of WLFI sales despite its decline. Donald Trump's 2025 profits reached $799 million.

Most of Donald Trump's 2025 revenue was derived from his businesses' cryptocurrency ventures.

In June 2026, Reuters reported that "the US president and his sons have added at least $2.3 billion to the family fortune from their main crypto ventures, while the investors they've wooed have taken a $2.3 billion hit."

Cryptocurrency: Trump gains and investor losses, November 2024–April 2026
	World Liberty Financial	$TRUMP meme coin	ALT5 Sigma	American Bitcoin	Total
Trump gains	+$1.1 B	+$616 M	+$538 M	+$19 M	+$2.273 B
Investor losses	-$674 M	-$711 M	-$675 M	-$216 M	-$2.276 B

=== Political donations ===
In the 16 months from January 2025 through April 2026, Trump's super PAC, MAGA Inc., reported over $342 million in donations. The Wall Street Journal reported at the end of July 2026 that Trump had raised over $800 million, including from corporations, since returning to office.

On September 4, 2026, Trump told reporters he planned to “spend whatever amount of money necessary" to help certain candidates. He specified: "This is money for MAGA Inc. This is my money, that I control ... separate from the RNC.”

=== Gifts ===
A Swiss delegation gave him a Rolex desk clock and a $130,000 gold bar.

Apple CEO Tim Cook gave him a piece of Corning glass on a 24-karat gold base.

=== Royal family of Qatar ===
On May 21, 2025, the Department of Defense accepted a luxury Boeing 747-8 jumbo jet, worth about $400 million, as a gift from the royal family of Qatar, to be used as Air Force One.

==== Funded by Qatar ====
Qatar officials initially expected the plane to be sold or leased to the U.S., however, people close to President Trump suggested to the Qataris that they donate it for free instead. When the anticipated gift was first publicly announced on May 11, 2025, Attorney General Pam Bondi and White House lawyer David Warrington formally opined that, despite being a gift from a foreign state, it would be legal as long as it were donated to the Department of Defense (rather than to Trump personally) and then gifted to the Trump presidential library foundation just before Trump leaves office.

==== Funded by U.S. taxpayers ====
Additional taxpayer funds were needed to retrofit the aircraft. Although three aviation experts told NBC that the retrofitting might cost $1 billion, Air Force Secretary Troy Meink testified on June 5, 2025 before the House Armed Services Committee that it would cost "probably less than $400 million". Andrew Hunter, former assistant secretary of the Air Force under the Biden administration, said he expected retrofitting would be a years-long process. On July 1, 2026, Air Force officials said the cost of the modifications was classified. The modifications apparently had not included three missile defense features that were visible on other Air Force One 747s: infrared light emitters, fuselage apertures, and sensors. When asked about this, Trump acknowledged that the plane would be sent for more modifications.

==== Possible benefits for Qatar ====
On May 28, 2025, the Washington Post reported that Qatar was requesting a memorandum of understanding to release it from any liability.

On September 29, 2025, Trump signed an executive order that the United States will treat "any armed attack" on Qatar "as a threat to the peace and security of the United States."

On October 10, at a Pentagon press conference alongside Qatari Defense Minister Sheikh Saoud bin Abdulrahman Al Thani, U.S. Defense Secretary Pete Hegseth announced that a Qatari Emiri Air Force facility would be built in Idaho at the U.S. Mountain Home Air Force Base. Hours later, following public criticism, Hegseth posted to X: "to be clear, Qatar will not have their own base in the United States—nor anything like it."

In January 2026, after Trump seized Venezuelan oil valued at $500 million, revenue from the oil sales was held mainly in a bank account in Qatar controlled by the U.S. government.

==== Use of jet ====
The aircraft was unveiled on June 19, 2026, and Trump took his first flight on it on July 1. However, he abruptly stopped flying on it a week later, due to what the New York Times reported was a "credible threat" from Iran. He resumed flying in the plane, then stopped using it in mid-September.

=== Licensing the Trump name ===
On June 16, 2025, he announced a new business called Trump Mobile that planned to sell an Android phone model called a T1 for $499 along with 5G service for an additional $47.45 per month. Trump Mobile took preorders and said it would begin shipping the phones in May 2026.

On June 30, 2025, he announced two fragrances called the Victory 45-47 scents. They sell for $249 per bottle. As the disclaimer said they were "not designed, manufactured, distributed or sold" by Trump himself or the Trump Organization, HuffPost speculated that Trump was likely receiving a licensing fee.

=== Receiving services provided for free ===
In September 2025, House and Senate Democrats wrote to law firms Paul Weiss, Kirkland & Ellis and Skadden Arps asking why they were reportedly providing free legal services, valued at tens of millions of dollars, to the Commerce Department, after having been pressured by Trump.

=== Investments in sectors that benefit from national policies ===
From late August to early October 2025, he bought corporate and municipal bonds valued at somewhere between $82 and $337 million, investing in sectors that benefit from his policies, including tech companies, banks and retailers.

In September or October 2025, Trump adviser Peter Navarro requested that the Office of Strategic Capital loan money to Vulcan Elements, a company in which Donald Trump Jr.'s venture capital firm has a stake. The Office of Strategic Capital announced a $620 million loan to Vulcan in November 2025.

Having announced in the summer of 2025 that the White House would begin hosting Ultimate Fighting Championship events, on March 25, 2026, Trump bought $15,001–$50,000 of stock of UFC's parent company, TKO Group Holdings. A UFC event was held at the White House on Trump's 80th birthday, June 14. UFC CEO Dana White said the event cost the UFC $60 million, and "I can't afford it ... we'll never do this [the White House] again." The following November, White declined Trump's offer to be White House press secretary.

Trump made over a thousand stock transactions in June 2026, as he disclosed.

On August 18, 2026, Trump purchased between $1 million and $5 million in bonds issued by SpaceX (the largest space-launch company), and two days later, he signed a memorandum announcing a policy to increase space-travel.

Trump's Nvidia holdings increased during his second presidency. Whereas at the end of 2024, he had reported owning $615,000–$1.3 million of Nvidia stock, at the end of August 2026 he owned $13–$62 million of it.

=== 2025 financial disclosure ===
Released in summer 2026, the 925-page document discloses hundreds of millions of dollars in proceeds from crypto tokens as well as holdings from hundreds of company stocks, including weapons companies and Nvidia.

On August 5, 2026, in his $10 billion defamation lawsuit against the BBC, Trump withdrew allegations that the BBC had caused financial damage to his brand and, in turn, asked the court not to require him to disclose his financial records. The court granted his request.

== Net worth ==
Trump's net worth over time, as estimated by Forbes magazine

Discrepancies in the estimates of various organizations are due in part to the uncertainty of appraised property values, as well as Trump's own assessment of the value of his personal brand.

=== 1980s and 1990s ===
Trump was listed on the initial Forbes List of wealthy individuals in 1982 as having a share of his family's estimated $200 million net worth. Former Forbes reporter Jonathan Greenberg said in 2018 that during the 1980s Trump had deceived him about his actual net worth and his share of the family assets in order to appear on the list. According to Greenberg,

"it took decades to unwind the elaborate farce Trump had enacted to project an image as one of the richest people in America. Nearly every assertion supporting that claim was untrue. Trump wasn't just poorer than he said he was. Over time, I have learned that he should not have been on the first three Forbes 400 lists at all. In our first-ever list, in 1982, we included him at $100 million, but Trump was actually worth roughly $5 million – a paltry sum by the standards of his super-monied peers – as a spate of government reports and books showed only much later."

After several years on the Forbes List, Trump's financial losses in the 1980s caused him to be dropped from 1990 to 1995, and reportedly obliged him to borrow from his siblings' trusts in 1993.

In 1997, Trump visited P.S. 70, an elementary school in the Bronx. The chess team needed money to travel to the national championship tournament. Trump dropped a fake $1 million bill in their basket. He later mailed them $200.

=== 2000s and 2010s ===
In 2005, The New York Times referred to Trump's "verbal billions" in a skeptical article about Trump's self-reported wealth. At the time, three individuals with direct knowledge of Trump's finances told reporter Timothy L. O'Brien that Trump's actual net worth was between $150 and $250 million, though Trump then publicly claimed a net worth of $5 to $6 billion. Claiming libel, Trump sued the reporter, and his book publisher, for $5 billion, lost the case, and then lost again on appeal; Trump refused to turn over his unredacted tax returns despite his assertion they supported his case.

When he filed his 2008 tax return, he reported losses of $651 million, having called his Trump International Hotel and Tower (Chicago) "worthless". In 2010, his lawyers put the building under DJT Holdings LLC, which would later cover other Trump properties and businesses and would record an additional $168 million in losses over the next decade. This drew IRS attention, and it was reported in 2024 that Trump might owe $100 million in taxes in a revised calculation for these moves.

In April 2011, amid speculation whether Trump would run as a candidate in the United States presidential election of 2012, Politico quoted unnamed sources close to him stating that, if Trump should decide to run for president, he would file "financial disclosure statements that [would] show his net worth [was] in excess of $7 billion with more than $250 million of cash, and very little debt". Although Trump did not run as a candidate in the 2012 elections, his "professionally prepared" 2012 financial disclosure was published in his book, which claimed a $7 billion net worth.

On June 16, 2015, just before announcing his candidacy for U.S. president, Trump released a one-page financial statement "from a big accounting firm – one of the most respected" – stating a net worth of $8,737,540,000. "I'm really rich," Trump said. Forbes believed his claim of $9 billion was "a whopper", figuring it was actually $4.1 billion. Several years later, his lawyer Michael Cohen admitted in his memoir that "I'd personally pumped in the helium into his balloon-like net worth," including by inflating his estimate of the worth of the Gucci building, and said that he knew Trump at this time had "$2 billion, absolute tops."

In June 2015, Business Insider published Trump's June 2014 financial statement, noting that $3.3 billion of that total is represented by "Real Estate Licensing Deals, Brand and Branded Developments", described by Business Insider as "basically [implying] that Trump values his character at $3.3 billion". Forbes reduced its estimate of Trump's net worth by $125 million following Trump's controversial 2015 remarks about Mexican undocumented immigrants, which ended Trump's business contracts with NBCUniversal, Univision, Macy's, Serta, PVH Corporation, and Perfumania.

In March 2016, Forbes estimated his net worth at $4.5 billion. A year later, shortly after his inauguration, they lowered it by $1 billion, and by the end of his presidential term, they had subtracted yet another $1 billion.

During the three years after Trump announced his presidential run in 2015, Forbes estimated his net worth declined 31% and his ranking fell 138 spots on the Forbes list of the wealthiest Americans. In its 2018 and 2019 billionaires rankings, Forbes estimated Trump's net worth at $3.1 billion. In 2018, this was 766th in the world, 248th in the U.S. In 2019, this was 715th in the world, 259th in the U.S. Bloomberg Billionaires Index listed Trump's net worth as $2.48 billion on May 31, 2018, and Wealth-X listed it as at least $3.8 billion on July 16, 2018.

=== 2020s ===
DJT stock price reached over $79 per share after its public offering, but declined thereafter.

Since its public offering, Trump Media & Technology Group Corp. has had net operating losses.

On October 3, 2023, Forbes estimated Trump's wealth at $2.6 billion and announced that he had not made their annual Forbes 400 list. The main reason, they said, was that, over the past year, "Trump’s 90% stake in Truth Social’s parent company has plummeted in value from an estimated $730 million to less than $100 million." Another major reason was that the value of his building at 555 California Street in San Francisco "is down by an estimated $100 million or so" and 1290 Avenue of the Americas in New York "is down by roughly $60 million."

Some of his properties were generating profit; for example, one of his golf properties, Trump National Doral, has about $20 million in annual profit. Nonetheless, Trump is "$300 million shy of the cutoff" for the list, Forbes explained; that is, the 400 wealthiest Americans each have at least $300 million more than he does.

In March 2024, when Trump Media & Technology Group (TMTG) became a public company after merging with Digital World Acquisition Corp., a special-purpose acquisition company, Trump's net worth increased by over $4 billion. He made the top 500 in Bloomberg Billionaires Index for the first time, with an estimated net worth of $6.5 billion. He was awarded an additional 36 million TMTG shares the next month, bringing his ownership in the company to around 65%.

The value of TMTG decreased significantly by over 65% between its peak in March 2024 peak and August 2024, at which point his net worth was estimated to be $4.3 billion. Trump was not permitted to sell his shares until September 25, 2024. As of November 2024, Trump has not sold any.

In July 2025, reporting in the New York Times estimated Trump had "As much as $7.1 billion" in Cryptocurrencies, "At least $2.2 billion" in Stocks, bonds and cash, "At least $1.3 billion" in "Real estate and other business holdings" and "More than $640 million plus interest" in debts.

=== Debt and FEC filings ===
In July 2015, federal election regulators released new details of Trump's self-reported wealth and financial holdings when he became a Republican presidential candidate, reporting that his assets are worth above $1.4 billion, which includes at least $70 million in stocks, and a debt of at least $265 million. According to Bloomberg, for the purposes of Trump's FEC filings Trump "only reported revenue for [his] golf properties in his campaign filings even though the disclosure form asks for income", noting independent filings showing all three of his major European golf properties were unprofitable.

Mortgages on Trump's major properties – including Trump Tower, 40 Wall Street, and the Trump National Doral golf course – each fall into the "above $50 million" range, the highest reportable category on FEC filings, with Trump paying interest rates ranging from 4% to 7.125%. Mortgages on those three properties were separately reported as $100 million, $160 million, and $125 million in 2013. Trump is a leaseholder, not owner, of the land beneath 40 Wall Street. Other outstanding Trump mortgages and debts are pegged to current market interest rates.

A 2012 report from Trump's accounting firm estimated $451.7 million in debt and other collateral obligations. Filings in 2015 disclosed debt of $504 million, according to Fortune magazine. Bloomberg documented debt of at least $605 million in 2016. Trump's outstanding debt was at least $650 million in August 2016, in addition to an outstanding loan of $950 million to the Bank of China and Deutsche Bank (among other creditors) on 1290 Avenue of the Americas, in which Trump is a minority owner.

In April 2020, it was reported that Trump was tens of millions of dollars in debt to China. In 2012, Trump's real estate partner refinanced the building 1290 Avenue of the Americas for almost $1 billion. The debt includes $211 million from the state-owned Bank of China, which matures in 2022. Trump owns a 30% stake in 1290 Avenue of the Americas.

Trump reported a yearly income of $362 million for 2014 and $611 million from January 2015 to May 2016. Trump and his family reported more than $500 million of income in mid-2018 financial disclosure forms.

In September 2020, The New York Times noted that Trump "is personally responsible for loans and other debts totaling $421 million, with most of it coming due within four years" and no obvious way to repay them. As of December 2020, he owed about $330 million to Deutsche Bank, due in 2023 and 2024. The subsequent resignation of Trump's accounting firm, Mazars, on the grounds that Trump had provided them with inaccurate information for ten years of financial statements, will make it more difficult for Trump to refinance, said Bloomberg Opinion executive editor Tim O'Brien.

In October 2020, Trump had a total of over $1 billion in debts, borrowed to finance his assets, reported Forbes. Around $640 million or more was owed to various banks (Deutsche Bank, Professional Bank, Amboy Bank, and Investors Savings Bank) and trust organizations (Ladder Capital, Chevy Chase Trust Holdings, and the Bryn Mawr Trust Company). Around $450 million was owed to unknown creditors, due to loans related to his properties of 1290 Avenue of the Americas and 555 California Street. In addition, Trump owes over $50 million to Chicago Unit Acquisition LLC, a company he owns, which would indicate that this company is worth over $50 million; however Trump has not disclosed any value for this company on his financial disclosure report. Overall, Trump's assets still outvalued his debts, reported Forbes.

In early 2024, Trump was ordered to pay over a half-billion dollars in two civil cases: the E. Jean Carroll lawsuit and the New York business fraud lawsuit. However, in August 2025, an appeals court voided the penalty in the business fraud lawsuit, ruling that it was excessive.

=== Trump on his own net worth ===
Trump has often given much higher values for his wealth than organizations estimating it. Trump has testified that "my net worth fluctuates, and it goes up and down with markets and with attitudes and with feelings – even my own feelings". On the same day, Trump's own stated estimates of his net worth have varied by as much as $3.3 billion. Trump has also acknowledged that past exaggerated estimates of his wealth have been "good for financing".

A July 2015 campaign press release, issued one month after Trump announced his presidential run, said the FEC did not design its reports to accommodate "a man of Mr. Trump's massive wealth" and that his net worth is "in excess of [$10 billion]".

In 2015, Forbes said that although Trump "shares a lot of information with us that helps us get to the figures we publish", he "consistently pushes for a higher net worth – especially when it comes to the value of his personal brand". In 2023, they said he had "for decades" been "relentlessly lying to reporters to try to vault himself higher on the [Forbes 400] list."

In February 2022, Trump claimed in a defensive argument regarding the New York investigations of The Trump Organization that his net worth was "approximately $8 to $9 billion", based on his brand value and "transactions which have or will take place".

On August 30, 2023, New York attorney general Letitia James alleged in a court filing that Trump had falsely reported his wealth. She said he had increased his claim each year from 2011 to 2021 by between $812 million to $2.2 billion.

== House subpoenas and court rulings ==
On May 10, 2019, House Ways and Means Committee chairman Richard Neal subpoenaed the Treasury Department and the IRS for six years of Trump's tax returns. Seven days later, Treasury Secretary Steve Mnuchin refused to comply with the subpoenas.

On May 20, 2019, President Trump lost an unrelated lawsuit in which he sought to stop his accounting firm, Mazars USA, from complying with a subpoena from the House Oversight Committee for various financial records. The ruling against Trump was issued by Judge Amit Mehta of the U.S. District Court for the District of Columbia, who also denied the president a stay of the ruling pending any future appeal.

On November 4, 2019, the 2nd U.S. Circuit Court of Appeals in New York upheld the lower court ruling. On December 10, 2019, the 2nd U.S. Circuit Court of Appeals in New York issued a ruling which again found that the lower court had acted properly in upholding the congressional subpoenas for Trump's financial records, but this time also ordered for Deutsche Bank and Capital One to cooperate in releasing the financial records as well.

On July 9, 2020, the U.S. Supreme Court ruled 7–2 that Trump could not keep his financial records secret but that they should be given to the Manhattan DA rather than the House of Representatives. The Supreme Court denied a request for a stay on February 22, 2021, and the Manhattan DA received the financial records that same day.

In late 2022, the House Ways and Means Committee received Trump's tax returns.

== New York tax law and investigations ==
In May 2019, both houses of the New York State Legislature, which is based in Trump's native and business home of New York, approved a bill which allows the state's tax commissioner to release any state tax return requested by the leaders of the House Ways and Means Committee, the Senate Finance Committee or the Joint Committee on Taxation for any "specific and legitimate legislative purpose".

Former Trump Organization CFO Allen Weisselberg and Eric Trump each invoked their Fifth Amendment right against self-incrimination over 500 times during their interviews (September 24 and October 5, 2020, respectively).

After a Supreme Court ruling on February 22, 2021, cleared the path for Trump's tax records to be reviewed by a grand jury, the Mazars accounting firm turned over millions of pages of documents, including Trump's tax returns from January 2011 to August 2019, to the office of the Manhattan district attorney (DA). In early 2022, Mazars notified Trump that it did not trust the reliability of the information he had provided them for a decade, and thus it no longer backed the financial statements it had prepared for him, and it said it would no longer serve as his accountant. In late 2022, the House Ways and Means Committee received Trump's tax returns and publicly released them.

In mid-2021, the RNC agreed to pay $1.6 million toward Trump's legal bills in the New York investigations, although they concern business dealings that occurred before he became president. Trump would owe income tax on money he received from the RNC. During the last nine months of 2023, the Save America PAC paid nearly $39 million in political donor money to pay legal fees for several of Trump's court cases.

=== Criminal case ===
In February 2021, Manhattan DA Cyrus Vance Jr. subpoenaed the New York City Tax Commission as well as Trump's creditors as part of a criminal investigation into possible property tax fraud by the Trump Organization, suggesting it sought to examine the real estate values Trump had reported. The documents would disclose whether the company inflated the value of properties to secure favorable terms on loans while deflating those values to lower tax bills. In December 2021, two editors at Forbes, who had once written about Trump's estimated wealth, testified to the grand jury.

In August 2022, Allen Weisselberg pleaded guilty to grand larceny, criminal tax fraud and falsifying business records and agreed to testify against The Trump Organization at trial.

=== Civil case ===
In January 2022, a filing by the New York state AG, Letitia James, reported that Trump's tax documents show that his liquid assets were about $93 million in 2020. In September, James sued Trump, the Trump Organization, and his children Donald Jr., Ivanka, and Eric for misrepresenting assets. The civil suit alleged over 200 instances of fraud and asserted that Trump "wildly exaggerated his net worth by billions of dollars". In September 2023, New York judge Arthur Engoron sided with James on her key claim. Though Engoron said he would cancel Trump's business certificates, a New York appeals court postponed this, and ultimately Engoron changed his mind.

On February 16, 2024, after a three-month trial, Engoron banned Trump from serving as an officer or director of a New York corporation for three years and his two eldest sons are similarly banned for two years. The Trump Organization will not have to dissolve, but an independent monitor must stay in place for three years, and the Trump Organization must also pay for an independent director of compliance. Engoron imposed a $364 million disgorgement, close to the $370 million James had sought. Additionally, Trump was ordered to pay roughly $100 million in interest.

Trump could not find an insurance company to underwrite an appeal bond for this amount ($464 million plus 20%). On March 20, Alina Habba was asked on Fox whether Trump sought "to secure this money through another country, [for example] Saudi Arabia or Russia". Habba said she was forbidden to "speak about strategy". On April 1, Trump posted a reduced bond of $175 million, as permitted by a New York appeals court. It was underwritten by Knight Specialty Insurance Company, Los Angeles, chaired by Don Hankey.

In August 2025, an appeals court voided the penalty that Engoron had ordered, ruling that it was excessive.

== E. Jean Carroll lawsuit ==
Trump was found liable for sexually abusing and defaming E. Jean Carroll. In May 2023, Carroll was awarded $5 million in damages, and in January 2024, an additional $83.3 million.

== See also ==
- Annual financial disclosures of Donald Trump
- False or misleading statements by Donald Trump
- Tax March
- Timeline of investigations into Donald Trump and Russia
- Wealth of Elon Musk
