= New York Executive Law Section 63(12) =

New York law

New York Executive Law § 63(12)

New York State Legislature
- Citation: Executive Law § 63
- Territorial extent: New York
- Passed by: New York State Legislature
- Passed: April 14, 1956
- Signed by: Averell Harriman
- Status: Current legislation

New York Executive Law § 63(12), sometimes called simply "63 12" or "63(12)", is a New York law that gives the Attorney General of New York broad powers to investigate and prosecute cases of alleged civil fraud. Due to its broad definitions, section 63(12) provides the AG with far-reaching powers to issue subpoenas, as well as low legal hurdles to do so. The law was passed in 1956, while Jacob Javits was attorney general, and signed by governor Averell Harriman.

Section 63(12) has been used in many high-profile prosecutions, including in People v. Exxon Mobil (2018), during the New York civil investigation of The Trump Organization, and against Martin Shkreli.
