= Arthur Engoron =

American judge (born 1949)

Arthur F. Engoron

Justice of the New York State Supreme Court from the 1st Judicial district
- Incumbent
- Assumed office January 1, 2016

Acting Justice of the New York State Supreme Court
- In office 2013 – January 1, 2016

Personal details
- Born: 1948 or 1949 (age 77–78) New York City, New York, U.S.
- Party: Democratic
- Children: 4
- Education: Columbia University (BA); New York University (JD)

Arthur F. Engoron (/ɛŋˈɡɔːrɑːn/ en-GOR-on; born 1949) is an American judge serving on the New York Supreme Court since 2013. He presided over the New York civil investigation of the Trump Organization in 2024.

== Early life and education ==
Engoron was born in Queens, New York City. He and his family later moved to East Williston, New York. Engoron wrote for the student newspaper at The Wheatley School in Old Westbury, and graduated in 1967. In the late 1960s, Engoron drove a yellow taxi for a year while completing his undergraduate studies. He received his bachelor's degree from Columbia University in 1972. He spent four years as a drummer before enrolling at the New York University School of Law, and received his Juris Doctor in 1979.

In one court ruling, Engoron revealed he had taken part in "huge, sometimes boisterous, Vietnam War protests".

== Career ==
Engoron started his legal career at Olwine, Connelly, Chase, O'Donnell & Weyher, a now-defunct firm in New York City. He then worked for the New York City office of Pryor Cashman from 1981 to 1983, leaving to pursue a musical career. He spent seven years teaching piano and drums. In 1991, he became a law clerk for Martin Schoenfeld, an Administrative Law Judge for the Social Security Administration.

In 2002, Engoron was elected judge to the New York City Civil Court. In 2013, he was appointed acting justice to the Manhattan Supreme Court. He ran unopposed for a permanent position to that court in 2015.

=== Donald Trump trials ===
January 11, 2024, was the final day of the New York v. Trump trial. Before the hearing began that day, Nassau County police announced that they had responded to a security incident at Engoron's residence at 5.30am. The Guardian reported that Engoron and his staff have been frequent targets of vitriolic criticism from Donald Trump throughout the case, and that the judge's office has been bombarded with death threats. On February 16, Engoron levied a $355 million fine on Trump for civil fraud. He ruled that Trump is not allowed to run a company in New York state for three years. However, Engoron did not order the dissolution of Trump's company. The New York State Commission on Judicial Conduct began an investigation into Engoron after an outside attorney claimed to have spoken with Engoron about the relevant fraud statute in the case three weeks prior to Engoron's verdict. New York State’s Office of Court Administration issued this statement: "No ex parte conversation concerning this matter occurred between Justice Engoron and Mr. Bailey or any other person". Engoron denied any impropriety and said he was uninfluenced in his decision-making by the conversation he had with Mr. Bailey. On August 22, 2025, the New York appeals court overturned the $355 million civil fraud judgment, but not the fraud case. In addition, sanctions that Engoron had imposed on Trump's attorneys were overturned, with the appeals court writing that Engoron's decisions were "sometimes conclusory and insufficiently rigorous in their legal analysis."

== Personal life ==
Engoron is a fan of pop culture references, frequently using them in his rulings. He has drafted and pitched a screenplay for a historical romantic drama about Holocaust survivors. He is a Democrat.

Engoron has been married three times and has four children.
