= Rosemary Vrablic =

American banker

Rosemary Teresa Vrablic
- Born: 1960 or 1961 (age 64–65)
- Education: Fordham University (BS); Pace University (MBA)
- Occupation: Banker
- Title: Former managing director and senior private banker, Deutsche Bank U.S.

Rosemary Teresa Vrablic (born 1960/1961) is an American banker who worked as the managing director and senior private banker of Deutsche Bank's U.S. private wealth management (PWM) business. In 2013, Vrablic was managing assets valued at $5.5 billion on behalf of about 50 clients, 40% of whom had made their money in real estate. Her high-net-worth clients include Herbert Simon, the billionaire owner of the Indiana Pacers, and Jared Kushner. According to the New York times and the Financial Times, she was "Donald Trump’s longtime private banker" before her resignation from Deutsche Bank in December 2020.

== Early life ==
Vrablic grew up in New York, the daughter of Joseph S. Vrablic (died 2005) and Bernice Vrablic. She attended The Ursuline School in New Rochelle, New York, and earned a bachelor's degree from Fordham University and an MBA from Pace University.

== Career ==
Vrablic began her career as a bank teller, before moving into private banking in 1989, working for Citigroup and then Bank of America, joining Deutsche Bank in 2006. She got her start in private banking in 1989 when she was still a bank teller, living with her parents in Scarsdale, New York, after a chance two-hour train conversation with Howard Ross, the then-chief credit officer of Bank Leumi. On joining Deutsche Bank in 2006, she was widely recognized as one of the top private bankers to the US ultra high-net-worth community.

Vrablic announced her retirement from Deutsche Bank on December 22, 2020, at the age of 60. She said in a statement, "I’ve chosen to resign my position with the bank effective Dec. 31 and am looking forward to my retirement."

=== Notable clients ===
==== Donald Trump ====
According to the New York Times and the Financial Times, Vrablic was the "private banker" to Donald Trump. Prior to her arrival at Deutsche Bank, Trump had been unable to secure loans from Deutsche Bank as a result of having defaulted in 2008 on a $640 million from the bank for Trump International Hotel and Tower in Chicago. Under Vrablic's direction, the wealth management unit at Deutsche Bank ultimately loaned Trump more than $330 million.

==== Jared Kushner ====
In 2017, Jared Kushner and his mother had a personal unsecured line of credit from the bank for $5 to $25 million. In 2016, the bank loaned Kushner Companies $285 million to buy several floors of The Times Square Building from Africa Israel Investments. Kushner also issued a mortgage-backed security for the Puck Building through Deutsche Bank. In June 2013, a company associated with Kushner sold an apartment on Park Avenue to Ms. Vrablic and another Deutsche Bank colleague for approximately $1.5 million.

Other clients

Vrablic's other clients included Stephen M. Ross and Herbert Simon.
