= Trump Tower =

Skyscraper in Manhattan, New York

- View from Fifth Avenue, 2026

General information
- Status: Completed
- Type: Retail, office, and residential
- Architectural style: Modernist
- Location: 721 Fifth Avenue; Manhattan, New York City, US
- Coordinates: 40°45′45″N 73°58′26″W
- Current tenants: The Trump Organization
- Named for: Donald Trump
- Inaugurated: November 30, 1983; 42 years ago
- Cost: $300 million
- Owner: GMAC Commercial Mortgage

Height
- Architectural: 664 ft (202 m)

Technical details
- Material: Concrete
- Floor count: 58
- Lifts/elevators: 34

Design and construction
- Architect: Der Scutt
- Architecture firm: Poor, Swanke, Hayden & Connell
- Developer: Donald Trump
- Structural engineer: Irwin G. Cantor

Other information
- Number of units: 232
- Number of restaurants: 3
- Number of bars: 1

Website
- trumptowerny.com

Trump Tower is a 58-story, 664-foot-tall (202 m) mixed-use condominium skyscraper at 721–725 Fifth Avenue in the Midtown Manhattan neighborhood of New York City, United States, between East 56th and 57th Streets. The building contains the headquarters for the Trump Organization, as well as the penthouse residence of its developer, the businessman, and now U.S. president Donald Trump. Several members of the Trump family also live, or have lived, in the building. The tower stands on a plot where the flagship store of the department-store chain Bonwit Teller was formerly located.

Der Scutt of Swanke Hayden Connell Architects designed Trump Tower, and Trump and the Equitable Life Assurance Company (now the AXA Equitable Life Insurance Company) developed it. Although it is in one of Midtown Manhattan's special zoning districts, the tower was approved because it was to be built as a mixed-use development. Trump was permitted to add more stories to the tower in return for additional retail space and for providing privately owned public space on the ground floor, the lower level, and two outdoor terraces. There were controversies during construction, including the destruction of historically important sculptures from the Bonwit Teller store; Trump's alleged underpaying of contractors; and a lawsuit that Trump filed because the tower was not tax-exempt.

Construction on the building began in 1979. The atrium, apartments, offices, and stores opened on a staggered schedule from February to November 1983. At first, there were few tenants willing to move into the commercial and retail spaces; the residential units were sold out within months of opening. After Trump's 2016 presidential campaign and subsequent election, the tower saw large increases in visitation, though security concerns required the area around the tower to be patrolled for several years.

== Site ==
Trump Tower is at 721–725 Fifth Avenue in the northern section of Midtown Manhattan, on the east side of Fifth Avenue between East 56th and 57th Streets, in New York City, United States. It is adjacent to the Tiffany & Co. flagship store to the north and 590 Madison Avenue to the east. Other nearby buildings include the LVMH Tower and Fuller Building to the northeast; the L. P. Hollander & Company Building to the north; the Bergdorf Goodman Building and Solow Building to the northwest; the Crown Building to the west; 712 Fifth Avenue and the townhouses at 10 and 12 West 56th Street to the southwest; and 550 Madison Avenue to the southeast.

The building's main entrance is on Fifth Avenue, with a side entrance on 56th Street only for residents. On the sidewalk opposite the main entrance, there is a four-sided brown-and-beige clock, which was created by the Electric Time Company and is nearly 16 feet (4.9 m) tall. In August 2023, The New York Times wrote that the clock had been installed illegally, as the building's owner, the Trump Organization, had neither applied for nor received a permit. The Trump Organization finally applied for a permit in 2015, but the New York City Department of Transportation reminded the Trump Organization of its "2015 notification regarding unauthorized structures" in July 2023.

== Architecture ==
The 58-story Trump Tower was designed by Der Scutt of Swanke Hayden Connell Architects. Developed by the real-estate developer and later U.S. president Donald Trump, it is 664 feet (202 m) high. The top story is marked as "68" because, according to Trump, the five-story-tall public atrium occupied the height of ten ordinary stories. However, several Bloomberg L.P. writers later determined that Trump's calculations did not account for the fact the ceiling heights in Trump Tower were much taller than in comparable buildings, and the tower did not have any floors numbered 6–13. According to one author, the building may have as few as 48 usable stories. As of 2021, the building's official owner is GMAC Commercial Mortgage, according to the New York City Department of City Planning.

=== Form and facade ===
The 28-sided massing was intended to give the tower more window exposure. The large number of sides arises from Trump Tower's horizontal setbacks; this contrasts with other buildings, which typically have vertical setbacks. The exception is at the base, where the southwest corner has several stepped setbacks. The Trump Organization constructed terraces on the building's setbacks in exchange for extra floor area. These were included as part of Trump's agreement with the city during construction. There is a terrace on the fifth floor on the northern (57th Street) side of the building, with a smaller fourth-floor terrace on the southern (56th Street) side. The fifth-floor north-side terrace had several trees and a fountain, while the fourth-floor south-side terrace has little more than a few granite benches. The curtain wall of the facade is made entirely of gold-tinted, reflective glass. The Structurist magazine wrote in 1987 that the curtain wall "flaunts its status [...] and denies visual access with its reflective glistening surface".

Above the main entrance is a logo with 34-inch-high (86 cm) brass capital letters in Stymie Extra Bold font, which reads "Trump Tower". A concrete hat-truss at the top of the building, similar to one used in the Trump World Tower, ties exterior columns with the concrete core. This hat-truss increases the effective dimensions of the core to that of the building allowing the building to resist the overturning of lateral forces such as those caused by wind, minor earthquakes, and other impacts perpendicular to the building's height.

=== Structural features ===
The tower is a reinforced concrete shear wall core structure. At the time of its completion, it was the tallest structure of its type in the world. Trump Tower used 45,000 cubic yards (34,000 m^{3}) of concrete and 3,800 tons of steelwork. The use of a concrete superstructure was in contrast to many other skyscrapers, which were built on steel frames. Scutt said a concrete frame was easier to build and was more rigid than a steel frame was. More specifically, it employed a concrete tube structure, which had been pioneered by Bangladeshi-American structural engineer Fazlur Rahman Khan in the 1960s.

Trump Tower has been described as one of the city's least energy-efficient buildings per square foot. In 2017, Trump Tower's Energy Star score was 44 out of 100, below the city's overall median Energy Star score and lower than the 48 out of 100 score recorded in 2015. In May 2019 it was reported that eight of Trump's buildings in New York City, including Trump Tower, failed to meet the city's 2030 carbon emission standards, which were implemented as part of the city's "Green New Deal". The city threatened to fine Trump Organization for each year the infractions went unfixed.

=== Interior ===
==== Lower stories ====
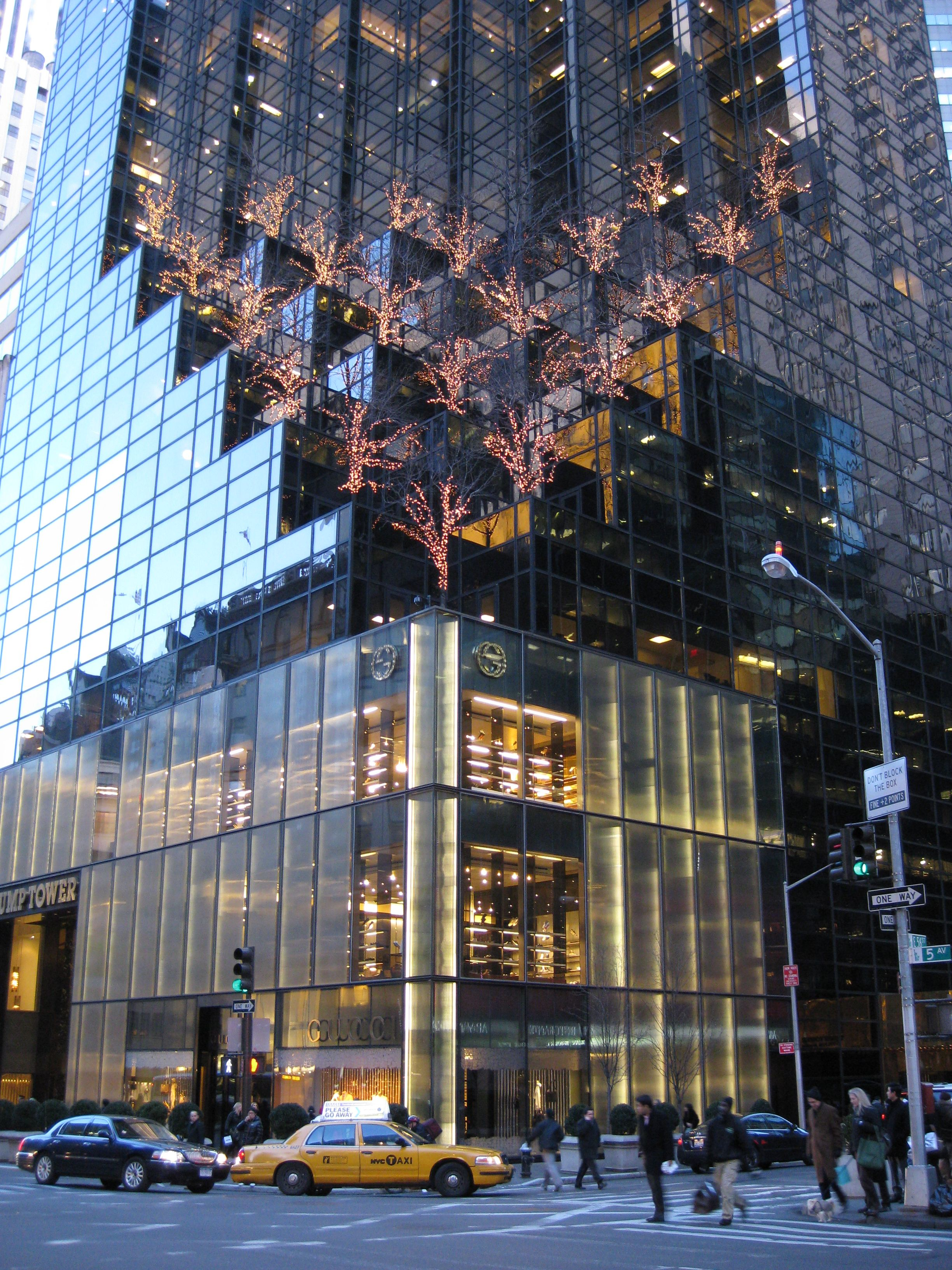
The stepped massing of the building's base supports lighted trees.

Originally, Trump only wanted to build an office building on the site, but the plot was in the Fifth Avenue special zoning district, which allowed more floor area for mixed-use towers with public space. In return for providing privately operated public space (POPS), Trump received floor area ratio (FAR) zoning bonuses that amounted to 105,436 square feet (9,795.3 m^{2}), allowing him to add several floors to the building. The public spaces in Trump Tower include the main lobby, the lower-level concourse and restrooms, and two outdoor terraces on the fourth and fifth floor. Under city law, POPS must be accessible from the street, provide a place to sit, and not require the public to purchase anything.

The Trump Organization built a five-story, 15,000-square-foot (1,400 m^{2}) atrium, which serves as the tower's main lobby. The atrium is connected to the Fifth Avenue lobby to the west and 590 Madison Avenue's atrium to the east. Under the POPS agreement, the atrium is supposed to be open to the public from 8 a.m. to 10 p.m. seven days a week. When the tower opened, the Fifth Avenue Association awarded the first-prize "mixed use building" award to the atrium, the association's first such award in five years. Sometime prior to 2008, the Trump Organization removed the public bench and installed a counter selling Trump-branded merchandise in the public space passageway inside the Fifth Avenue entrance. They were fined $2,500 in 2008 but the counter remained. By 2015, a second counter had been added. In 2016, the Trump Organization was fined $14,000 and ordered to remove the sales counters and reinstall the bench.

The tower's public spaces are clad in 240 tons of Breccia Pernice, a pink white-veined marble. The atrium contains a 60-foot-tall (18 m) indoor waterfall along its east wall, which is spanned by a suspended walkway, shops, and cafes. The atrium's escalators and structural columns are clad with mirrored panels. Six levels of balconies overlook the atrium.

Four gold-painted elevators transport visitors from the lobby to higher floors. A dedicated elevator leads directly to the penthouse where the Trump family lived. The atrium was originally supposed to be furnished with multiple 40-foot (12 m), 3,000-pound (1,400 kg) trees, which were transported at a cost of $75,000. Trump, who supposedly did not like how the trees looked, personally cut them down after impatiently waiting for contractors to remove them via a tunnel. Retail outlets include Gucci's flagship store at ground level.

The terrace accessible from the fifth floor of Trump Tower is located on the roof (sixth floor) of 6 East 57th Street, with entrances from that building and from Trump Tower. The terraces on the upper floors are open during the opening hours of the retail businesses. Due to poor signage in the lobby, the upper-story POPs are difficult to find.

==== Restaurants ====
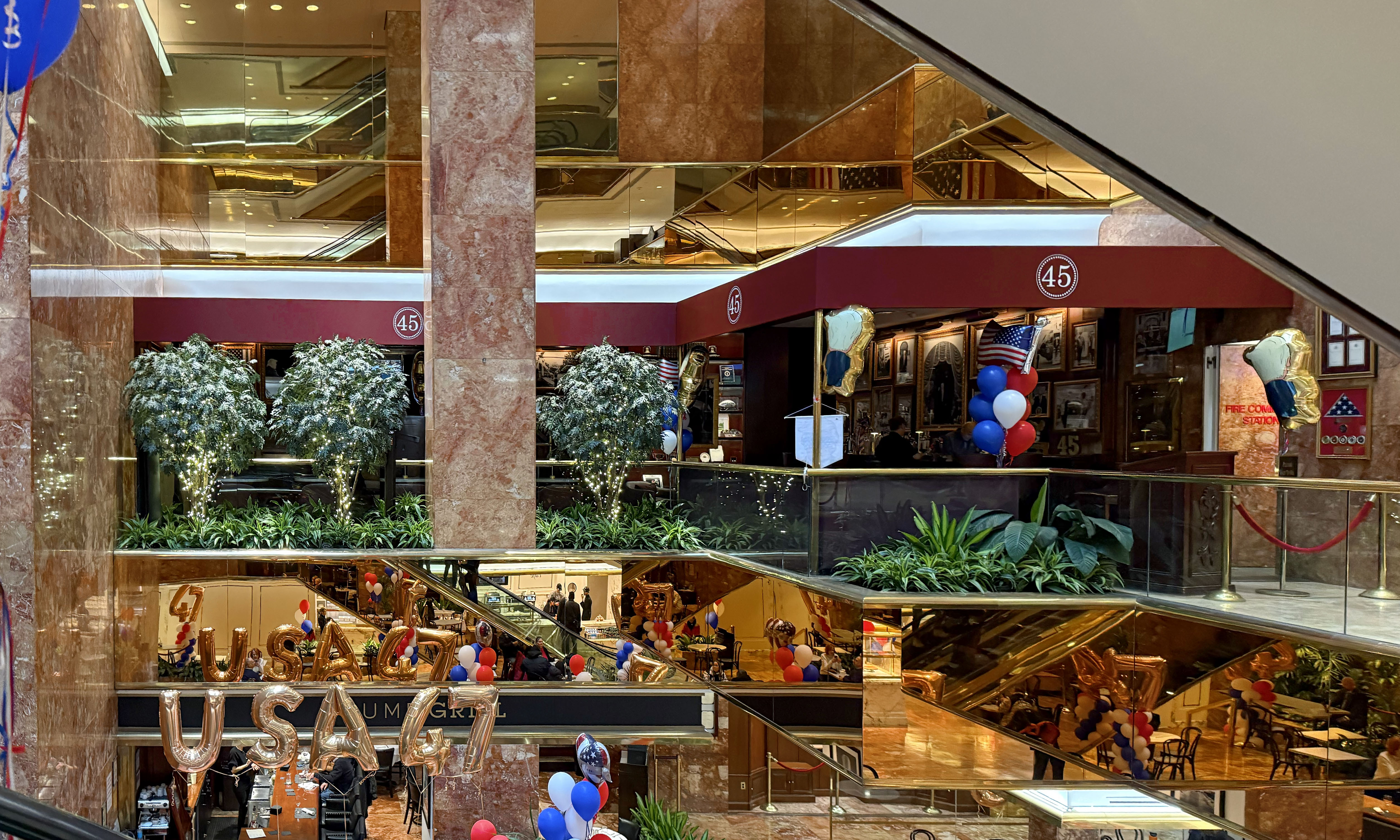
45 Wine and Whiskey, located in the lobby

The building contains several establishments for eating or drinking, including 45 Wine and Whiskey (formerly Trump Bar) in the lobby, and Trump's Ice Cream Parlor, Trump Cafe, and Trump Grill in the basement.

Trump Grill was generally panned as gaudy-looking and the food bland-tasting. Vanity Fair called it a contender for "the worst restaurant in America," with different menus for different customers and "steakhouse classics doused with unnecessarily high-end ingredients." Eater rated the food as "totally unadventuresome and predictable, though competently prepared, like food you might find in a country club." New York magazine wrote that "despite what the sign reads, countless restaurants trump this spot." In December 2016, Yelp reviews of Trump Grill averaged two-and-a-half out of five stars, while Google reviews averaged three of five stars. Health inspections in 2018 reported "evidence of mice or live mice" in and around the kitchen, according to records obtained by the New York Daily News, in violations the inspectors called "critical".

The Trump Bar in the lobby of the tower was remodeled and renamed 45 Wine and Whiskey in 2021 and opened in November. It featured 39 photos of Trump, and the drinks were described as overpriced.

Eater reviewed the three other establishments as well, finding them to be commonplace compared to Trump Tower's stature. The ice cream was described as "almost too soft to be scooped," and the cafe contained food such as a "rubbery and overcooked" hamburger patty and some "inedible" steak fries. The reviewers at Eater also wrote that the bar offered a small, overpriced drink menu and snacks that "do little to affirm the luxury that the place aspires to." Vice magazine also reviewed the bar and found it to be overpriced, with "a strong pour of watered-down vodka and a few Manzanilla olives" costing twenty dollars. New York magazine, reviewing the cafe, found the food to be "safe classics" that contrasted with the cafe's grandeur.

==== Upper stories ====
The building has thirteen office stories spanning floors 14 to 26, then another thirty-nine stories containing 263 residential condominiums on floors 30 to 68. Trump said he had placed the lowest residential story on floor 30 as part of a marketing strategy for all his towers, and that he "did not see why he should be forced to call the first residential floor something mundane like the second floor, or even the 20th floor." Trump may also have numbered the residential floors because he disliked the fact that the nearby General Motors Building was 41 feet (12 m) taller. Many of the apartments are furnished, but some of the upper-floor commercial spaces come unfurnished. In the apartments, mirrors and brass are used throughout, and the kitchens are outfitted with "standard suburban" cabinets.

The NBC television show The Apprentice was filmed in Trump Tower, on the fifth floor, in a fully functional television studio. The set of The Apprentice included the famous boardroom, which was prominently featured in the television show, where at least one person was fired at the end of each episode. Donald J. Trump for President, Inc., founded in 2015 to manage Trump's 2016 U.S. presidential campaign, was headquartered within part of the space where The Apprentice was filmed; unlike the former boardroom, the headquarters is unfurnished, with some offices containing "only drywall and no door". After Trump's successful election, the campaign was moved out of the tower and into office space in Arlington, Virginia, where his unsuccessful 2020 re-election campaign was headquartered.

== History ==
=== Planning ===
==== Site acquisition and rezoning ====
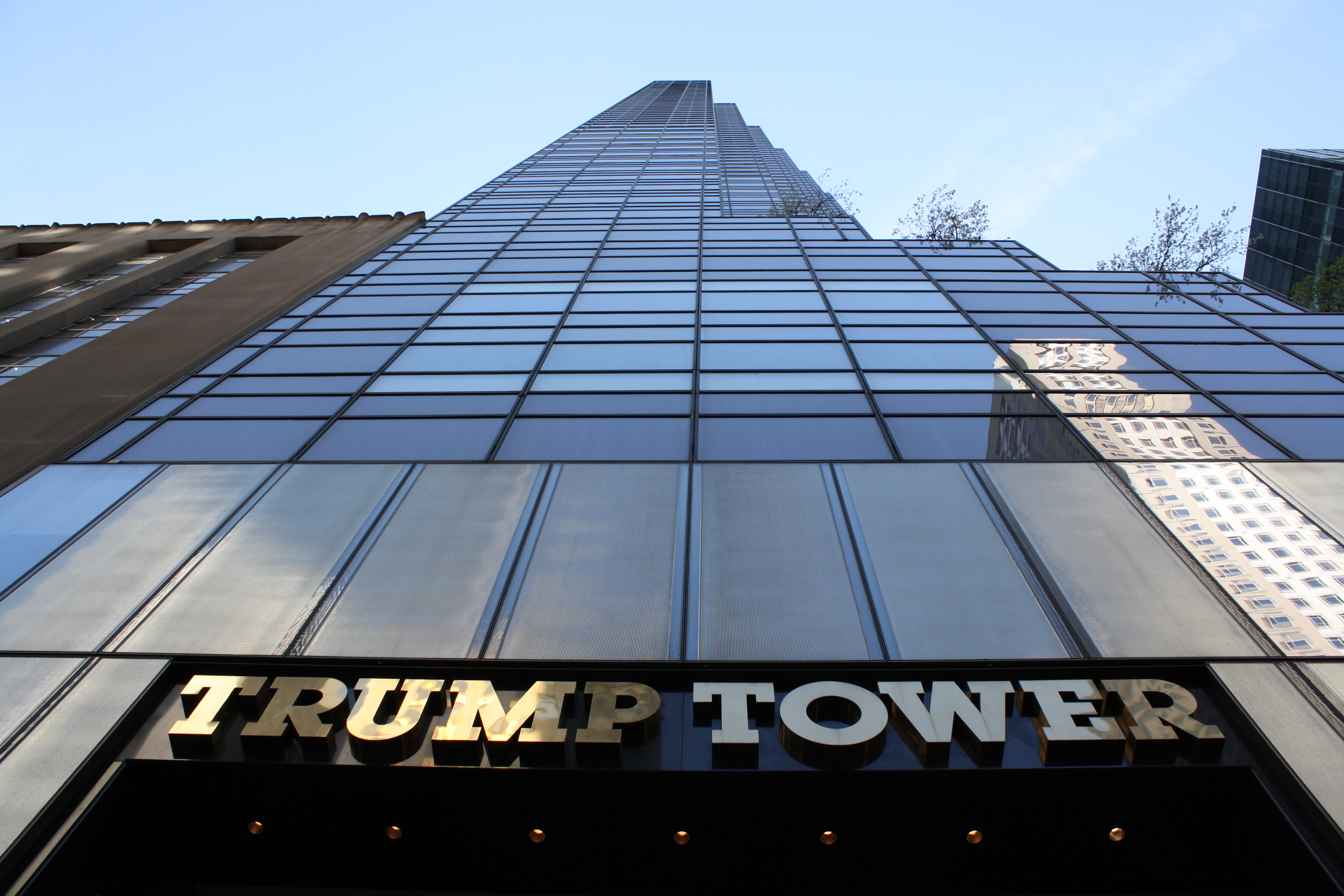
Looking upward from the Fifth Avenue entrance

Donald Trump had envisioned building a tower at 56th Street and Fifth Avenue in Manhattan since childhood, but formulated plans to develop the site only in the mid-1970s, when he was in his thirties. At the time, the flagship store of Bonwit Teller, an architecturally renowned building built in 1929, occupied the lot. The site was next to Tiffany & Co.'s flagship building, which Trump considered the city's best real-estate property. Approximately twice every year, Trump contacted Bonwit Teller's parent company, Genesco, to ask whether they were willing to sell Bonwit Teller's flagship store. Trump said the first time he contacted Genesco, "they literally laughed at me." Genesco continued to decline his offers and, according to Trump, "they thought I was kidding."

In 1977, John Hanigan became the new chairman of Genesco. He looked to sell off some assets to pay debts, and Trump approached him with an offer to buy the Bonwit Teller building. In early 1979, Genesco sold off many of the Bonwit Teller locations to Allied Stores, and the brand's flagship building was sold to the Trump Organization for about $10 million. At the time, the Equitable Life Assurance Society of the United States owned the land, while Genesco had a long-term lease on the land, with 29 years remaining. If Trump were to buy the building, his tower's ownership could be transferred to Equitable in 2008, once the lease expired. Equitable initially refused to sell the land to Trump, but the Trump Organization bought the lease instead, and Equitable exchanged the land in return for a 50% stake in the construction project itself. This was more profitable for Equitable, since they were getting only $100,000 per year from Genesco for the use of the land, while a single residential condominium in the tower could be sold for millions of dollars. Trump also bought the air rights over Tiffany's flagship store to prevent another developer from tearing down the store and building a taller building.

Trump then needed to convince the New York City Department of City Planning, Manhattan Community Board 5, and the New York City Board of Estimate to rezone the area for his planned tower. In 1979, the New York Committee for a Balanced Building Boom had opposed the planned rezoning over fears Fifth Avenue's character would be changed by the construction of skyscrapers. Trump later said a positive review of the building by Ada Louise Huxtable, The New York Times' architectural critic, had helped secure the support of some of the more skeptical members on each committee. The deal attracted some criticism from the media. A writer for New York magazine said the approval of Trump Tower has "legitimized a pushy kid nobody took seriously," while The Wall Street Journal wrote that Trump combined "a huckster's flair for hyperbole with a shrewd business and political sense," and The Village Voice said Trump "turn[s] political connections into private profits at public expense."

==== Design process ====
The Trump Organization closed Bonwit Teller's flagship store in May 1979, and the store was demolished by the next year. By late 1979, Allied had leased space for a Bonwit Teller store at the building's base. Meanwhile, Trump hired Der Scutt as the architect of Trump Tower in July 1978, a year before the Bonwit Teller site was purchased. Scutt had collaborated with Trump before to develop Grand Hyatt New York and several other projects. The architect initially proposed a design similar to Boston's John Hancock Tower, but Trump strongly objected. He preferred a building that was both expensive and very tall, with a design that both critics and potential tenants would approve of. Trump later said that "the marble in Trump Tower would cost more than the entire rent from one of my buildings in Brooklyn."

Two major factors affected Trump Tower's construction. One was the decision to use a concrete superstructure. The other was the decision to design it as a mixed-use building as part of the Fifth Avenue special zoning district. As originally planned, the tower was to have 60 stories consisting of 13 office floors, 40 residential floors, and two floors for mechanical uses, but this was later amended. The base was to be made of limestone, while the building's elevators were to be in a separate glass structure outside the main tower. The final plan called for the building to contain 58 stories. The lowest six floors were to be occupied by the atrium, followed by 13 office floors above it, and 39 residential floors above the office floors.

While creating the final design for Trump Tower, Scutt studied the designs of other skyscrapers, almost all having a similar architectural form. To make Trump Tower stand out from the "boxy" International Style buildings being erected at the time, Scutt designed the tower as a 28-faced edifice with an "inverted pyramid of cubes" at the base. This design received mixed reviews from critics: although it was widely praised as creative, many reviewers also believed the tower could be covered in masonry to blend in with neighboring buildings, or that its height should be reduced for the same reason. The city ultimately accepted this design.

=== Construction ===
HRH Construction was hired as the contractor on Trump Tower. The company would go on to build many of Trump's other real-estate developments. HRH hired several dozen subcontractors to work on different aspects of the building. Barbara Res, who had worked on some of Trump's other projects, was hired as the construction executive in October 1980. She had previously worked for HRH Construction during the building of the Citigroup Center and the Grand Hyatt. Res was the first woman assigned to oversee a major New York City construction site. She was often ignored by subcontractors and suppliers who were new to the project, as they thought the person in charge of construction was a man.

The head superintendent of the project was Anthony "Tony Raf" Rafaniello, who worked for HRH Construction. He was in charge of coordinating construction based on the site's blueprints. Rafaniello was supported by five assistant superintendents, including Jeff Doynow, who was one of the first "concrete supervisors" to be hired for the construction of a skyscraper. After Rafaniello was hired for the Trump Tower project in September 1980, he spent a week planning a three-phase construction schedule. Once the subcontractors were hired, Rafaniello made sure they met once a week to ensure they were working on the same phase.

Trump Tower's proposed mixed-use status posed obstacles during construction since there were different regulations for residential, commercial, and retail spaces. Several prospective commercial and residential tenants requested custom-made features, including the installation of a swimming pool for one unit, and the removal of a wall with utilities inside it for another. Trump's then-wife, Ivana Trump, was involved in selecting some of the tower's minor details. Donald Trump and Res agreed to fulfill many of these requests, but they did not always agree on matters of design. In one case, Trump so hated the marble slabs at some of the tower's corners that he demanded they be removed completely, even at great cost; he eventually decided bronze panels should be placed over the marble, but Res later said she refused to buy them.

Trump Tower was one of the first skyscrapers with a concrete frame, along with Chicago's One Magnificent Mile engineered by Fazlur Rahman Khan in 1983. The contractors had to complete a floor before they started erecting the floor above it. Concrete was more expensive in New York City than anywhere else in the United States, which raised the construction costs. All the floors above the 20th used a roughly similar design, and each of these floors could be completed within two days. However, the floors below the 20th floor were all different, so each took several weeks to erect. Trump Tower had a low number of worker fatalities during construction. One worker died during the tower's excavation after a neighboring sidewalk collapsed. Another incident occurred when the tower's 25th through 27th floors accidentally caught fire, slightly damaging a construction crane and delaying construction for two months. In May 1983, a glass windowpane fell from a crane installing windows on the tower, hitting two pedestrians, one of whom later died from a skull fracture.

Trump Tower was topped out by July 1982, two-and-a-half years after the start of construction. Originally, it was estimated the tower would cost $100 million to build. The total cost ended up being approximately twice that; this included $125 million in actual construction costs and $75 million for other expenditures such as insurance.

=== Operation ===
==== 1980s ====
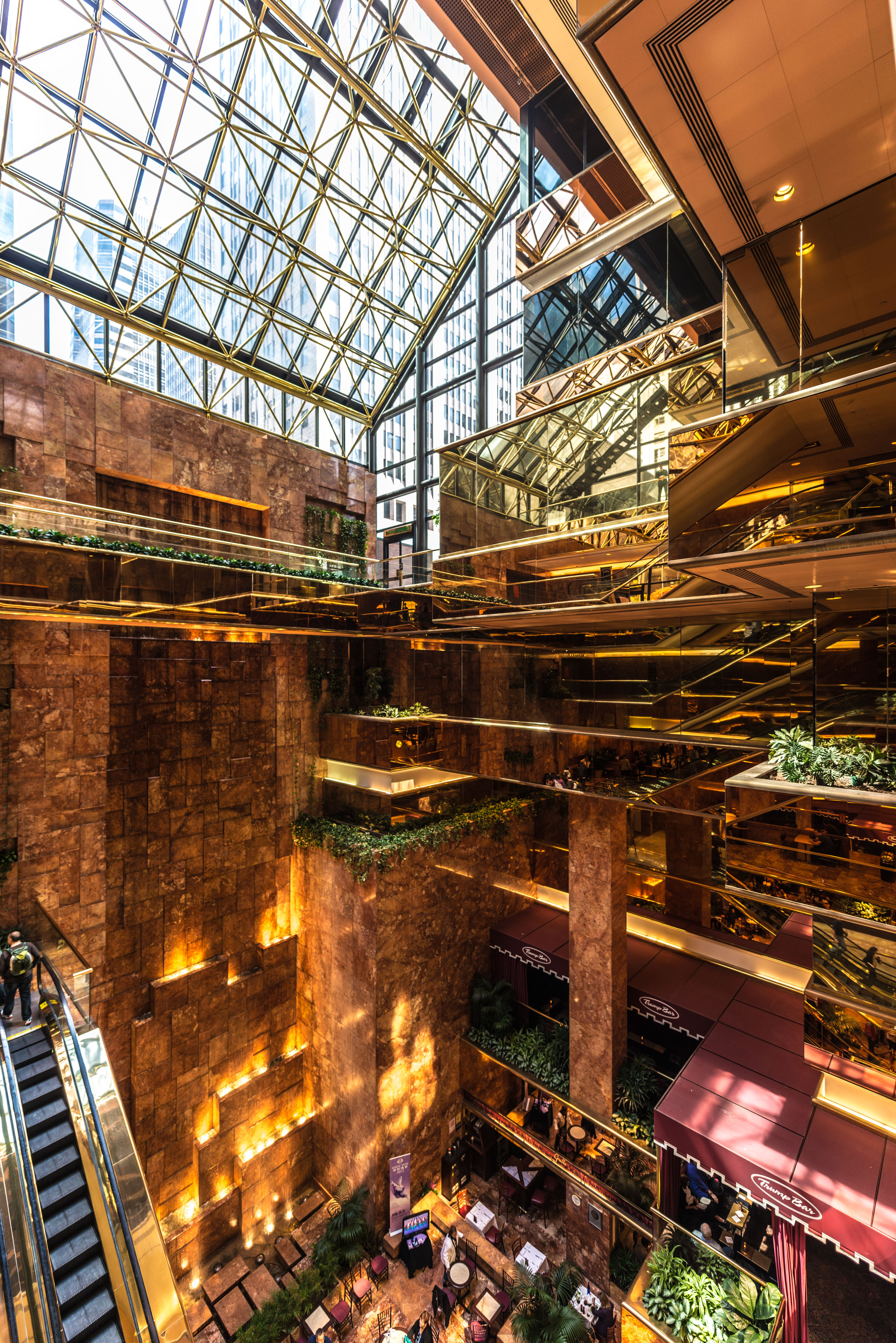
Trump Tower atrium in 2013

Trump bought full-page advertisements in multiple newspapers and magazines to advertise his new tower. The first tenants included Asprey and Ludwig Beck, who moved into the building before its planned opening in early 1983. The grand opening of the atrium and stores was held on February 14, 1983, with the apartments and offices following shortly afterwards. The tower's forty ground-level stores opened for business on November 30, 1983. At the building's dedication, Mayor Koch said, "This is not your low-income housing project ... of which we need many. But we also need accommodations, uh, for those who can afford to pay a lot of money and bring a lot of taxes into the city." By August 1983, the construction loan for Trump Tower's construction had been paid off using the $260 million revenue from the sale of 85% of the 263 condominium units. Ninety-one units, representing over a third of the tower's total housing stock, had sold for more than $1 million. The first residents were set to begin moving in that month.

Despite the destruction of the Bonwit Teller store's building, the flagship store itself was able to keep operating at the site, having signed a lease for 80,000 square feet (7,400 m^{2}) within the lower-levels' shopping area. The controversy over the destruction of the Bonwit Teller decorations had largely subsided: In August 1983, one New York Times reporter wrote that "the only negative comments about Donald Trump these days are given off the record." By then, there were forty high-end outfits that had opened stores in the tower. These included Buccellati, Charles Jourdan brands, Mondi, and Fila. Trump said in 1985 that there were more than a hundred stores wanting to move into a space in the tower. Around this time, he began describing the tower as "something of a New York landmark." By 1986, between 15% and 20% of the tower's original stores had closed or moved to another location. The commercial rents were the highest of any building along Fifth Avenue at the time, with retail space in the atrium costing $450 per square foot ($4,800/m^{2}) per year. One writer for Vanity Fair magazine noted that as tenants were evicted from the tower's atrium due to high rents, several of them sued the Trump Organization for issues such as overbilling and illegal lease termination.

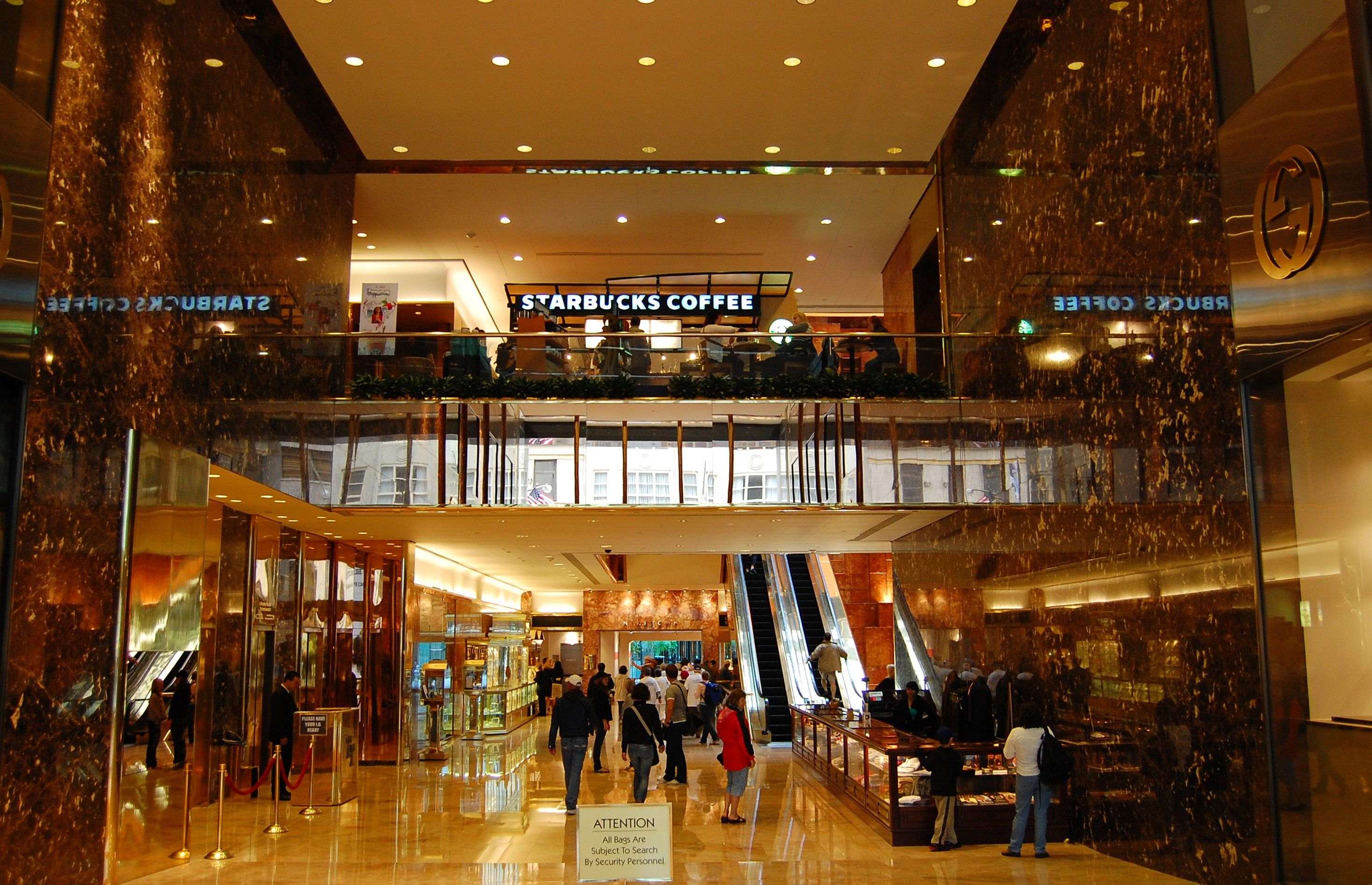
View of the atrium from its base in 2010

The residential units were more successful, and 95% of the residential condominiums were sold in the first four months after it opened, despite their high prices. The cost of condominiums at the tower started at $600,000 and ranged up to $12 million, and the penthouse was sold for $15 million in 1985. The tower attracted many rich and famous residents, including Johnny Carson, David Merrick, Sophia Loren, and Steven Spielberg. In total, Trump received $300 million from the sale of the condominiums, which more than offset the $200 million cost of construction. By 1991, Trump was involved in lawsuits against residents: in October of that year, he successfully sued actress Pia Zadora and her husband, businessman Meshulam Riklis, to collect $1 million in unpaid rent.

The city government, under mayor Ed Koch, challenged the validity of the tax breaks given to Trump Tower. The government originally tried to deny a tax break on the basis that Trump Tower did not replace an "underused" site, as was required under the 421-a tax exemption program. The New York Court of Appeals rejected the city's argument in 1984. Afterward, the city claimed Trump Tower's commercial space did not qualify for the exemption, but the Court of Appeals also rejected this argument in 1988. The city government then tried to reduce the amount of the exemption based on a more stringent method of calculation. In 1990, the New York Court of Appeals ruled that the New York City government had to give Trump $6.2 million in tax rebates.

==== 1990s ====
The flagship Bonwit Teller store remained as one of Trump Tower's retail offerings until March 1990, when its parent company declared bankruptcy and closed the Trump Tower location. In July of that year, Galeries Lafayette announced that it would sign a 25-year lease to move into the space previously occupied by Bonwit Teller, a move that expanded its business to the United States while helping Trump pay off the debts incurred by the tower's construction and operation. The new store opened in September 1991 after a $13.7 million renovation, but was unprofitable and lost a net $3.6 million in the first year alone because it had made only $8.4 million in sales.

Galeries Lafayette announced that it would be closing the Trump Tower location in August 1994, less than three years after it opened, due to its inability to pay the $8 million annual rent and taxes. Critics cited other factors, including the decision not to include merchandise from top French designers as the company's French locations had done. The Galeries Lafayette store was replaced with a Niketown location. By this time, most of the high-end retailers had moved out of Trump Tower, having been replaced with more upper-middle-class outlets such as Coach and Dooney & Bourke.

==== 2000s to present ====
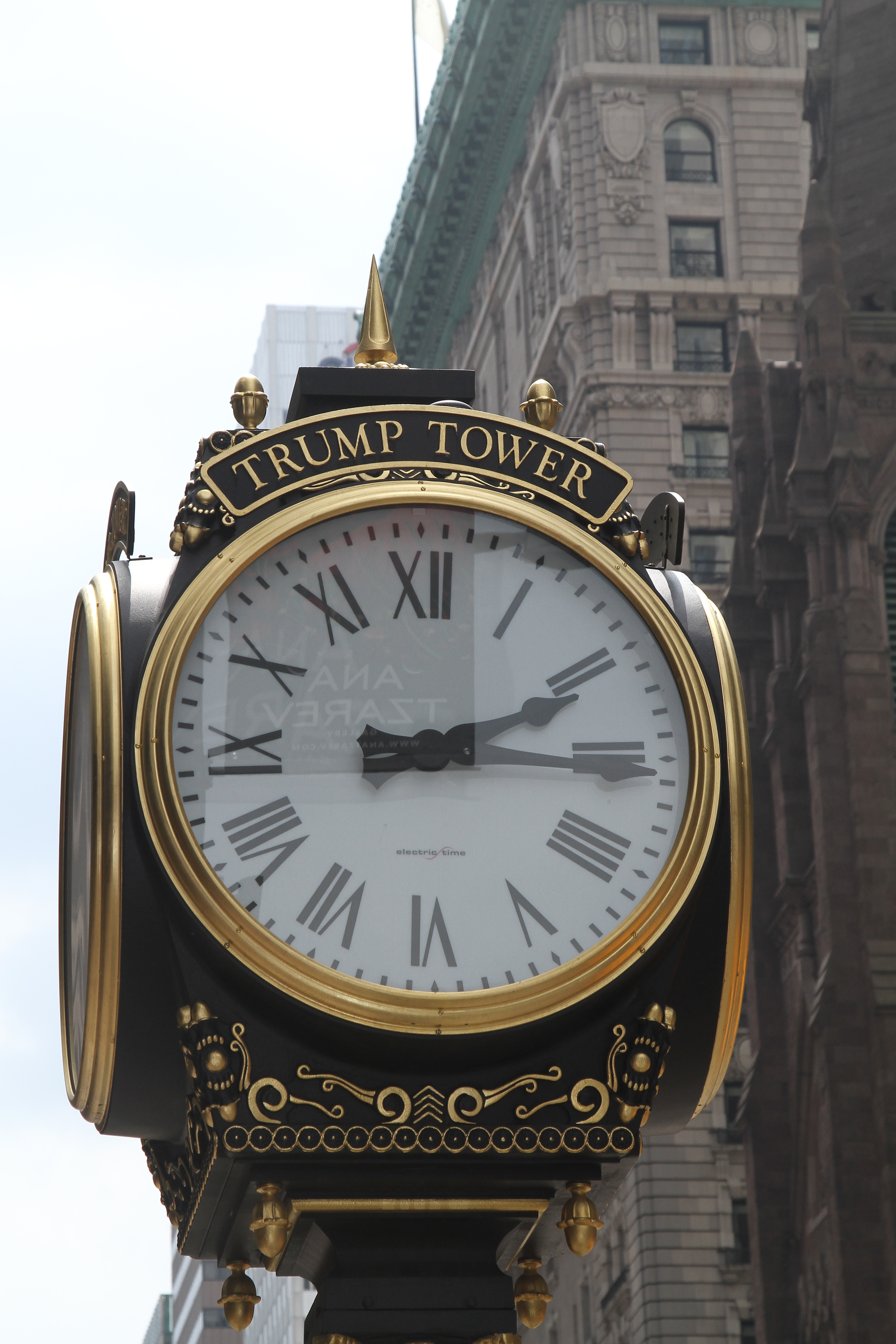
Clock in front of Trump Tower in 2012

In 2006, Forbes magazine valued the 300,000 square feet (28,000 m^{2}) of office space at up to $318 million; the tower itself was valued at $288 million. Trump took a ten-year, personally guaranteed $100 million mortgage loan on the building in 2012. Between 2014 and 2015, the building's valuation rose from $490 million to $600 million, making the tower the single most expensive property under Trump's ownership. In 2016, the tower's value dropped from $630 million to $471 million due to a 20% reduction in the tower's operating income and a further 8% decline in the overall value of real estate in Manhattan. Because of the $100 million debt, Forbes magazine calculated that Trump's equity stake in the tower stood at $371 million, excluding the Trumps' three-story penthouse, which has a net floor area of 10,996 square feet (1,021.6 m^{2}).

After Trump launched his 2016 presidential campaign at Trump Tower in 2015, the number of visits to the tower had risen drastically, with many of the visitors being supporters of Trump's candidacy. Stores in the atrium sold campaign memorabilia such as hats, with the proceeds going toward funding his campaign. The tower gained popularity among New York City tourists in 2016, especially after Trump was elected president. In 2017, the city ordered the removal of two unauthorized kiosks in Trump Tower selling Trump's merchandise. The New York Times reported in 2020 that rent from the building's commercial spaces had earned Trump $336 million from 2000 through the end of 2018, amounting to over $20 million per year.

Wells Fargo & Co., the master servicer of the $100 million mortgage loan Trump took out in 2012, placed the tower on a debt watch list in September 2021 because its average occupancy had fallen to 78.9% from 85.9% at the end of 2020. Revenue was $33.7 million in 2020, $7.5 million in the first quarter of 2021. By early 2024, Gucci was the only large retailer in the tower's retail atrium, which had once contained up to 60 stores. Another analysis, publicized in February of the same year, found that the average per-square-foot cost of a condominium at Trump Tower had nearly halved from 2013 to early 2024. The decline in condo prices was attributed to competition from newer towers nearby, the age of the building, and the protests that regularly occurred outside it. In 2022, Trump refinanced the building with $100 million from Axos Bank.

In 2026, the Federal Aviation Administration established a permanent no-fly zone, effective October 29, that will remain in effect after Trump leaves office and will "prohibit aircraft within 1,000 feet above ground level and within one nautical mile" of the Tower.

== Tenants ==
=== Commercial tenants ===
The Italian fashion retailer Gucci is the biggest commercial tenant, renting 48,667 square feet (4,521.3 m^{2}) along Fifth Avenue since 2007. Their rent in 2019 was $440 per square foot; Gucci renegotiated the lease in 2020 and received a reduction in rent for agreeing to extend the lease beyond 2026. CONCACAF, the governing body of association football in North and Central America and the Caribbean, used to occupy the entire 17th floor. Qatar Airways, owned by the Qatari government, has rented commercial space in the tower since at least 2008, a fact that news media outlets noted when Executive Order 13769 suspended immigration from seven majority-Muslim countries but not from Qatar. In July 2025, FIFA leased offices at Trump Tower for the FIFA Club World Cup.

From 2008 to October 2019, the Industrial and Commercial Bank of China operated a bank branch with 100 employees on three rented floors of Trump Tower, for approximately $2 million a year. The bank rented 25,356 square feet, making it the third-largest tenant after Gucci and the Trump Corporation. It paid $95.48 per square foot in 2012. Forbes estimated that the bank paid about $3.9 million in rent in 2017 and 2018. Eric Trump said in October 2019 that the bank was continuing to rent two floors. According to Forbes staff, by October 2020, Trump had received approximately $5.4 million from the China state-owned bank ICBC through its $1.9 million annual rent in Trump Tower.

The monthly rent paid by the Donald Trump 2016 presidential campaign for its Trump Tower headquarters increased from $35,458 in March 2016 to $169,758 in August. From its launch in January 2017 until the end of 2018, the Donald Trump 2020 presidential campaign paid more than $890,000 in rent. In March 2021, the campaign's space on the 15th floor was taken over by one of Trump's PACs for $37,541.67 per month. The Trump Organization has its headquarters on the 25th and 26th floors. The New York Times reported in July 2025 that the retail space was mostly vacant except for the Gucci store and two stores on the basement and ground levels selling Trump-branded merchandise. The waterfall was turned off, and the escalators to the upper levels of the retails space were roped off.

==== 6 East 57th Street ====
The Trump Organization holds a ground lease on an adjacent building, 6 East 57th Street. One of Trump Tower's privately owned public spaces is located on top of this building, which housed the Niketown store starting in 1994. During and after the 2016 U.S. presidential election, opponents of Trump's election created petitions to relocate the Niketown store, whose lease ran through 2022. Nike closed the store in early 2018 as previously planned and moved to its new flagship store on Fifth Avenue in November. In 2018, Tiffany & Co. subleased the space until 2022 while the neighboring Tiffany & Co. flagship store was being renovated. The fashion house Louis Vuitton subleased the space in 2025 during the renovation of its own flagship store nearby.

=== Residential owners and tenants ===
==== Current ====
Donald Trump, his wife Melania, and their son Barron maintain a three-story residence on the penthouse floors, covering about 11,000 square feet (1,000 m^{2}). The tower was their primary residence until October 2019. The Trump Organization offices are on the 25th and 26th floors, and there is a private elevator between the penthouse and Trump's office. Trump uses the building for meetings, such as in April 2024 with President of Poland Andrzej Duda and former Prime Minister of Japan Taro Aso.

Angelo Donghia provided the original black-and-white, brass-and-mahogany design for the penthouse, which was later replaced with a gold-and-Greek-column design after Trump reportedly saw the more lavish house of the Saudi businessman Adnan Khashoggi. In a 1984 article in GQ magazine, Trump's first wife Ivana said the first floor of the penthouse had the living, dining, and entertainment rooms and kitchen; the second floor had their bedrooms and bathrooms as well as a balcony over the living room; and the third had bedrooms for the children, maids, and guests.

Other residents include the filmmaker Vincent Gallo; the art dealer Hillel "Helly" Nahmad, who bought a second apartment in the tower in July 2010; Juan Beckmann Vidal, the owner of the tequila brand Jose Cuervo; and the actor Bruce Willis, who bought a $4.26 million apartment in 2007.

==== Past ====
Past tenants include Jean-Claude "Baby Doc" Duvalier, the ex-president of Haiti who died in 2014, who was discovered to have lived in a $2 million apartment on the 54th floor in 1989, when public records in Haiti showed that he had forgotten to pay his bills. The singer Michael Jackson rented an apartment on the 63rd floor during the 1990s. The composer Andrew Lloyd Webber, known for musicals such as Cats, moved out of his 59th and 60th floor apartment in 2010 after 17 years of stating his intention to do so. Carlos Peralta, a billionaire businessman from Mexico, sold an apartment in Trump Tower in 2009 for $13.5 million. Prince Mutaib bin Abdulaziz Al Saud of Saudi Arabia, reportedly lived on an entire floor in the tower. The mobster Vyacheslav Ivankov reportedly had a residence in Trump Tower in the 1990s until he was arrested and deported.

Chuck Blazer, the former president of CONCACAF, rented two apartments on the 49th floor, one occupied by himself and another occupied by his cats, for a combined $24,000 per month. The apartments and office space were described as part of an "extravagant" lifestyle that ultimately resulted in Blazer being apprehended and becoming an FBI informant in a corruption investigation into several soccer organizations. José Maria Marin, former president of the Brazilian Football Confederation, had been living in a $3.5 million apartment; after being sentenced to four years in prison in 2018, he was placed under house arrest at his apartment in 2020. Portuguese soccer player Cristiano Ronaldo, who paid $18.5 million for an apartment in August 2015, put it on the market for $9 million in 2019 and sold it for $7.18 million in 2022.

Trump's parents, Fred and Mary, had a second home on the 63rd floor they sometimes used when visiting Manhattan. During Trump's presidency, the Secret Service initially used the apartment directly underneath Trump's triplex penthouse as their command post but moved into a trailer on the sidewalk in July 2017. In April 2017, the United States Department of Defense signed an 18-month lease for space in Trump Tower to house "personnel and equipment" dedicated to protecting the president, paying more than $130,000 per month to an owner other than Trump or the Trump Organization. The former Trump campaign manager Paul Manafort, who lived in the tower when he was Trump's campaign manager, agreed to forfeit his Trump Tower condo in September 2018, as part of a plea deal made during the Special Counsel investigation of Russian ties to the 2016 election.

== Incidents ==
=== During construction ===
==== Destruction of Bonwit Teller Building features ====
The art dealer Robert Miller owned a gallery across Fifth Avenue from the Bonwit Teller Building. When Miller heard the building was to be demolished, he contacted Penelope Hunter-Stiebel, a curator at the Metropolitan Museum of Art. In December 1979, Stiebel and Trump agreed that the Art Deco limestone bas-relief sculptures of semi-nude goddesses on the Bonwit Teller Building's facade, as well as the massive ornate 15 by 25 feet (4.6 by 7.6 m) grille above the store's entrance, would be removed and donated to the Metropolitan Museum. Miller had appraised the sculptures at between $200,000 and $250,000. In February 1980, Trump wrote a letter to an official at the museum, in which he stated, "Our contractor plans to begin demolition on the exterior of the building in approximately three to four weeks. He has been instructed to save these artifacts and take all necessary measures to preserve them." Every week, the Trump Organization and Stiebel would meet to discuss the transport of the sculptures. However, Stiebel later said the Trump Organization never seemed to be able to agree on a specific date for their transport, and the organization had repeatedly dismissed her concerns about not having received the letter.

On April 16, 1980, the grille and sculptures were removed from the building. They were set to be transported to a junkyard and destroyed because, according to Trump, there were general hazard concerns, expense, and a possible 10-day construction delay due to the difficulty of removing them. Stiebel rode by taxicab to the building site and attempted to pay the workmen for the sculptures, but she was rebuffed. The workers in charge of demolition told her she could make an appointment to go see the sculptures, but they then canceled several appointments that Stiebel made. The workers later told her the building's decorative grille had been transported to a New Jersey warehouse, but it was never recovered, and on May 28, Stiebel was informed the grille had been "lost". On June 5, the sculptures were destroyed. Stiebel had received notice of the sculptures' pending demolition, but by the time she reached the Trump Tower site, the workmen told her they had been ordered to "destroy it all." Trump later acknowledged he had personally ordered the destruction of the sculptures and grille. Trump said these "so-called Art Deco sculptures, which were garbage by the way," had been informally appraised by three different individuals as "not valuable," and they had pegged the sculptures' value at $4,000 to $5,000. He also told the media that carefully removing the sculptures would have cost him an extra $500,000 and would have delayed his project. In a New York Magazine article in November 1980, Trump said the decor of his Grand Hyatt New York included "real art, not like the junk I destroyed at Bonwit Teller."

The New York Times condemned Trump's actions as "esthetic vandalism," and a spokesman for Mayor Ed Koch said Trump had failed his "moral responsibility to consider the interests of the people of the city." Scutt was outraged by the destruction, having initially hoped to incorporate the goddess sculptures into the new building's lobby design; Trump had rejected the plan, preferring something "more contemporary." Miller lamented that such things would "never be made again," and Peter M. Warner, a researcher who worked across the street, called the destruction "regrettable." However, Trump later said he used the notoriety of that act to advertise more residential units in the tower.

==== Unpaid laborers ====
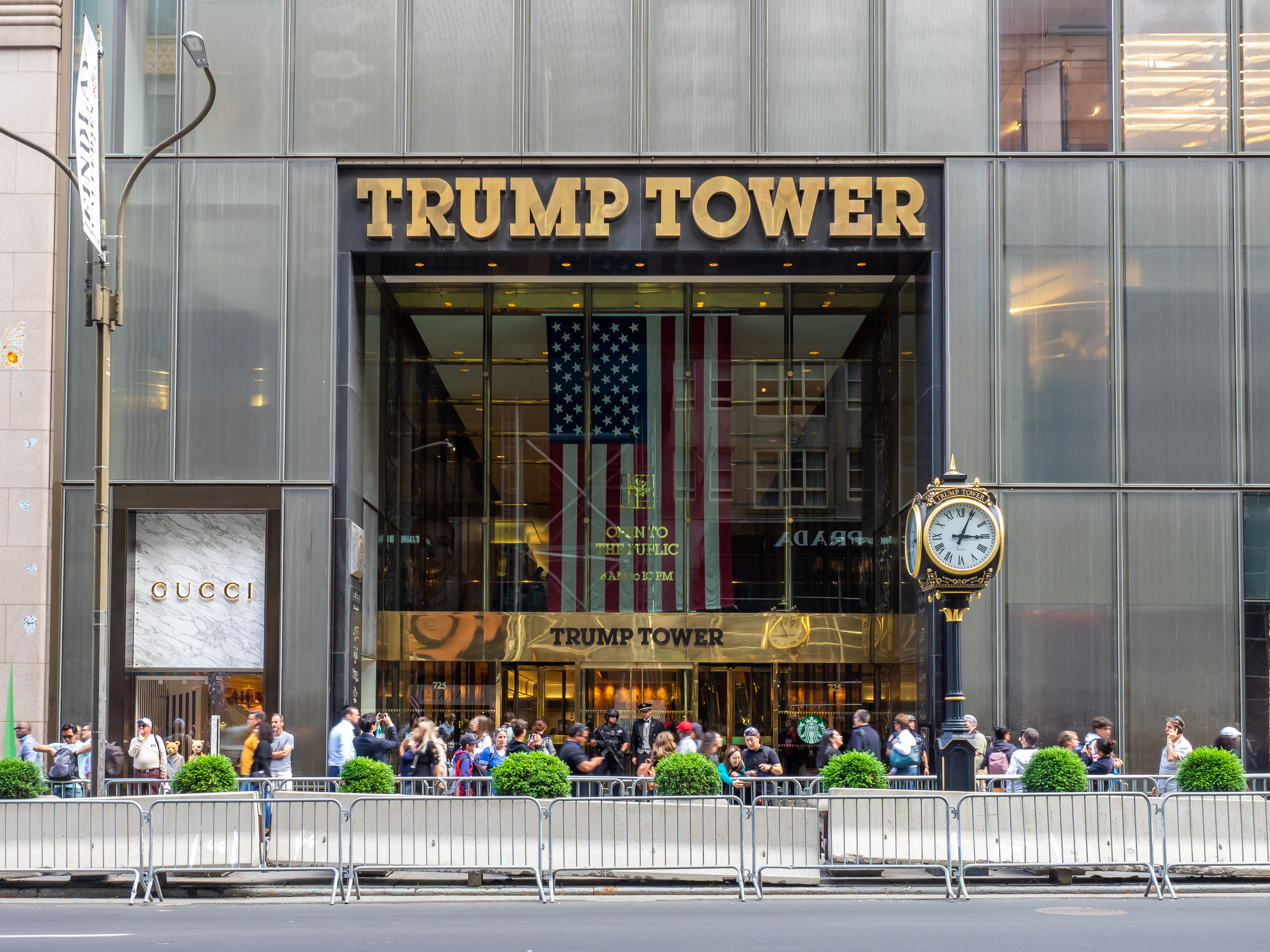
Main entrance (2019)

In 1983, a class-action lawsuit was filed against the Trump Organization concerning unpaid pension and medical obligations to labor unions whose members helped build the towers. Trump had paid $774,000 to a window-cleaning company that employed undocumented Polish immigrants during the renovation of an adjoining building. According to the laborers, they were paid $4 an hour (equivalent to $13 in 2025) for 12-hour shifts, and were not told about asbestos in the under-construction structure.

Trump testified in 1990 he was unaware that 200 undocumented Polish immigrants, some of whom lived at the site during the 1980 New York City transit strike, and worked round-the-clock shifts, were involved in the destruction of the Bonwit Teller building and the Trump Tower project. Trump said he rarely visited the demolition site and never noticed the laborers, who were visually distinct for their lack of hard hats. A labor consultant and FBI informant testified that Trump was aware of the illegal workers' status. Trump testified that he and an executive used the pseudonym "John Baron" in some of his business dealings, although Trump said he did not do so until years after Trump Tower was constructed. A labor lawyer testified that he was threatened over the phone with a $100 million lawsuit by a John Baron who supposedly worked for the Trump Organization. Donald Trump later told a reporter, "Lots of people use pen names. Ernest Hemingway used one." After the laborers filed for a mechanic's lien over unpaid wages, they said a Trump Organization lawyer threatened to have the Immigration and Naturalization Service deport them.

A judge ruled in favor of the Polish laborers in 1991, saying the organization had to pay the workers. The contractor was ultimately ordered to pay the laborers $254,000. The case went through several appeals by both sides as well as non-jury trials, and was reassigned to different judges several times. The original named plaintiff, plaintiffs' attorney, and two co-defendants died during the litigation. Judge Kevin Duffy compared the case unfavorably to Charles Dickens' fictional case Jarndyce and Jarndyce in June 1998, when he was assigned the case after the previous presiding judge had died. The lawsuit was ultimately settled in 1999, and its records were sealed. In November 2017, U.S. District Judge Loretta A. Preska ordered the settlement documents unsealed. In the settlement, Trump agreed to pay a total of $1.375 million, which, according to the plaintiffs' lawyer, was the full amount that could have been recovered at trial.

==== Other incidents ====
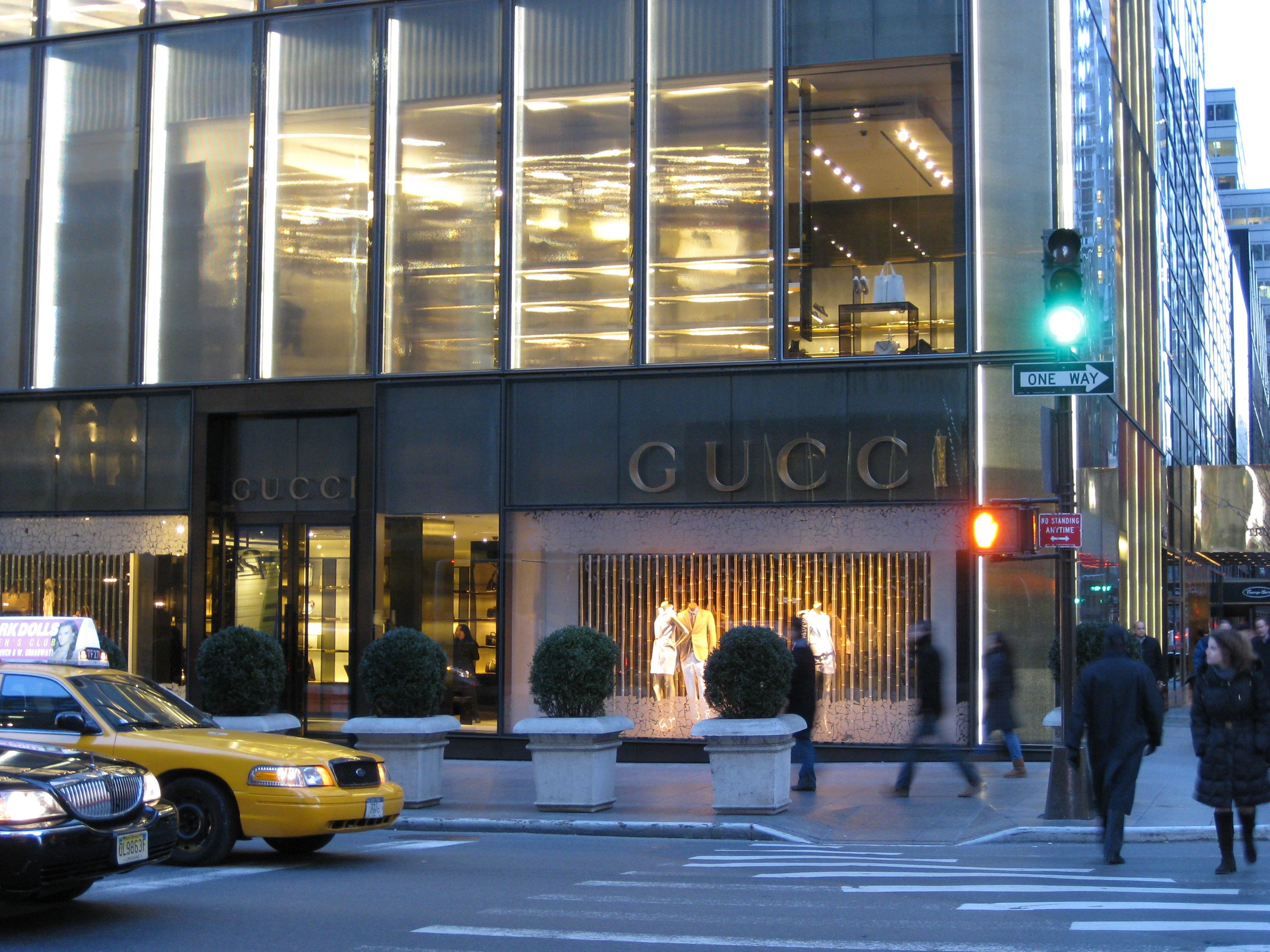
The Gucci store in Trump Tower is at the northeast corner of Fifth Avenue and 56th Street.

In one case, Trump sued a contractor for "total incompetence." Construction was also halted twice because minority rights' groups protested outside the Trump Tower site to condemn the shortage of minority construction workers.

Trump was also involved in a disagreement with Mayor Koch about whether the tower should get a tax exemption. In 1985, Trump was one of the plaintiffs in a lawsuit against the state in the New York State Court of Appeals concerning the payment of a 10% state tax in the event that a real estate property is transacted for $1 million or more. The exemption was reported as between $15 million and $50 million. The tax on Trump Tower was upheld in a 4-to-1 decision.

The City of New York granted Trump permission to build the top twenty stories of the building in exchange for operating the atrium as a city-administered, privately owned public space. In the lobby of the building are two Trump merchandise kiosks (one of which replaced a long public bench) operating out of compliance with city regulations. The city issued a notice of violation in July 2015, demanding the bench be put back in place. Although the Trump Organization initially said the violation was without merit, a lawyer speaking for Trump's organization stated in January 2016 that the kiosks would be removed in two to four weeks, before an expected court ruling.

Trump maintained a connection with organized crime members to supply the building's concrete. According to former New York mobster Michael Franzese, "the mob controlled all the concrete business in the city of New York," and that while Trump was not "in bed with the mob ... he certainly had a deal with us. ... he didn't have a choice." Mafia-connected union boss John Cody supplied Trump with concrete in exchange for giving his mistress a high-level apartment with a pool, which required extra structural reinforcement.

A 1992 book by journalist Wayne Barrett concludes that "Trump didn't just do business with mobbed-up concrete companies: he also probably met personally with [Anthony] Salerno at the townhouse of notorious New York fixer Roy Cohn ... at a time when other developers in New York were pleading with the FBI to free them of mob control of the concrete business." Barrett questioned some of Trump's business dealings in a Daily Beast article in 2011, and alleged that concrete was one of "several dozen" suspected mob connections Trump had. Trump admitted in 2014 that he had "had no choice" but to work with "concrete guys who are mobbed up."

=== Issues in Trump's first presidency (2017–2021) ===
==== Claims made by Trump ====
In March 2017, Trump wrote several posts on Twitter falsely claiming former president Barack Obama had wiretapped phones in the tower toward the end of the 2016 campaign. An Obama spokesperson refuted the claims and, during a subsequent meeting with the House of Representatives' Intelligence Committee that discussed the issue, FBI Director James Comey informed the committee that there was no evidence of wiretapping in the tower.

Trump also falsely claimed to own the painting Two Sisters (On the Terrace), an 1881 work by the French Impressionist artist Pierre-Auguste Renoir. The original work hangs in the Art Institute of Chicago. In October 2017, Timothy L. O'Brien said that during his interviews with Trump for the book TrumpNation: The Art of Being The Donald, he asked Trump about the copy of Two Sisters, which was then on Trump's plane. Trump repeatedly said his copy was the genuine work, despite O'Brien's statements to the contrary. By then, the Renoir copy was hanging in Trump's penthouse office. The Art Institute of Chicago released a statement refuting Trump's claim that his Renoir copy was the genuine one.

==== Security issues ====
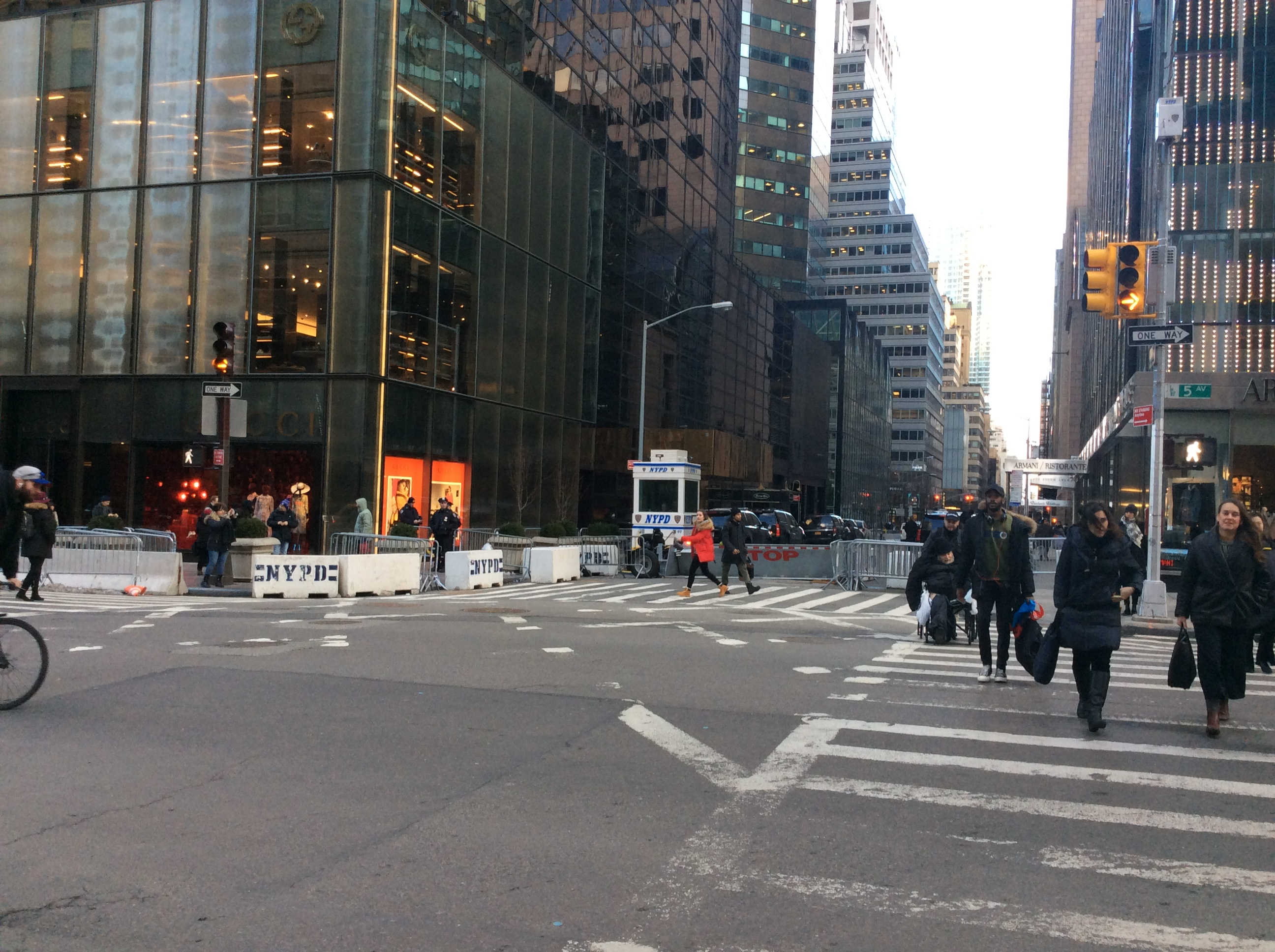
Zoomed-out view of the Gucci store, showing a security blockade over 56th Street

On August 9, 2016, a man posted a viral video on YouTube, claiming to be an independent researcher who wanted to speak to Donald Trump. The next day, a man (suspected to be the same person as identified in the YouTube video) climbed from the 5th to the 21st floors using industrial suction cups for aid climbing, though he was arrested after nearly three hours.

Serious issues concerning safety and security in the building arose after Trump became president-elect of the United States on November 8, 2016. Trump Tower served as a rallying point for protests against Trump after the election's results were announced, requiring the deployment of security measures. The block of 56th Street between Fifth and Madison Avenues was closed completely to vehicular traffic, but the eastern part of the street was later reopened to allow local deliveries. Customers of the Gucci and Tiffany stores in Trump Tower's lobby were allowed to proceed, while other pedestrians were redirected to the opposite side of the street.

During presidential visits, dump trucks from the New York City Department of Sanitation were parked outside the tower to prevent car bombs. Fire protection was also provided for the tower whenever Trump visited it. A Sensitive Compartmented Information Facility was set up for the president's use. The press nicknamed the now-heavily secured building White House North, comparing it to the White House's West Wing.

The Federal Aviation Administration imposed a no-fly zone over Trump Tower until January 20, 2017, and the NYPD stated that it expected to spend $35 million to provide security to the tower, subsequently revised to $24 million. As a result of the heavy security, businesses around the tower saw decreased patronage due to less foot traffic in the heavily secured area. Despite the heavy security after the 2016 election, there have been some detentions and arrests related to the increased security at the tower. On December 6, 2016, a woman reached the 24th floor—two floors below Donald Trump's office—before being stopped by Secret Service officers. A week later, a Baruch College student was arrested at Trump Tower and was found with multiple weapons. The day afterward, NYPD detained another man who wanted to meet Trump, reportedly got angry, and threw a wine glass on the lobby floor.

Protests around the tower subsided after Trump's inauguration in January 2017, and by summer 2017, security measures around the tower had been loosened, as they were only in place when Trump was physically on site. However, several businesses at the tower's base had closed by then because of a reduction in the number of customers. After Trump's presidency ended in January 2021, the vehicular barricades blocking access to 56th Street from Fifth to Madison Avenues were removed.

==== Other incidents ====
At around 5:30 p.m. (EDT) on April 7, 2018, a 4-alarm fire broke out in an apartment in the tower's 50th floor, killing a resident and injuring six firefighters. In a Twitter post, Trump attributed the fire's limited damage to the building's design. The only person to die was 67-year-old Todd Brassner, an art dealer known for his association with Andy Warhol. The residential units did not contain sprinklers because the structure had been built before 1999, when the city passed a law requiring sprinklers in residential units; Trump had lobbied against the proposal. The New York City Fire Department (FDNY) subsequently announced that the fire had been accidentally caused by power wires that had overheated. The April 2018 fire followed a minor electrical fire at the tower earlier that year, which had injured three people.

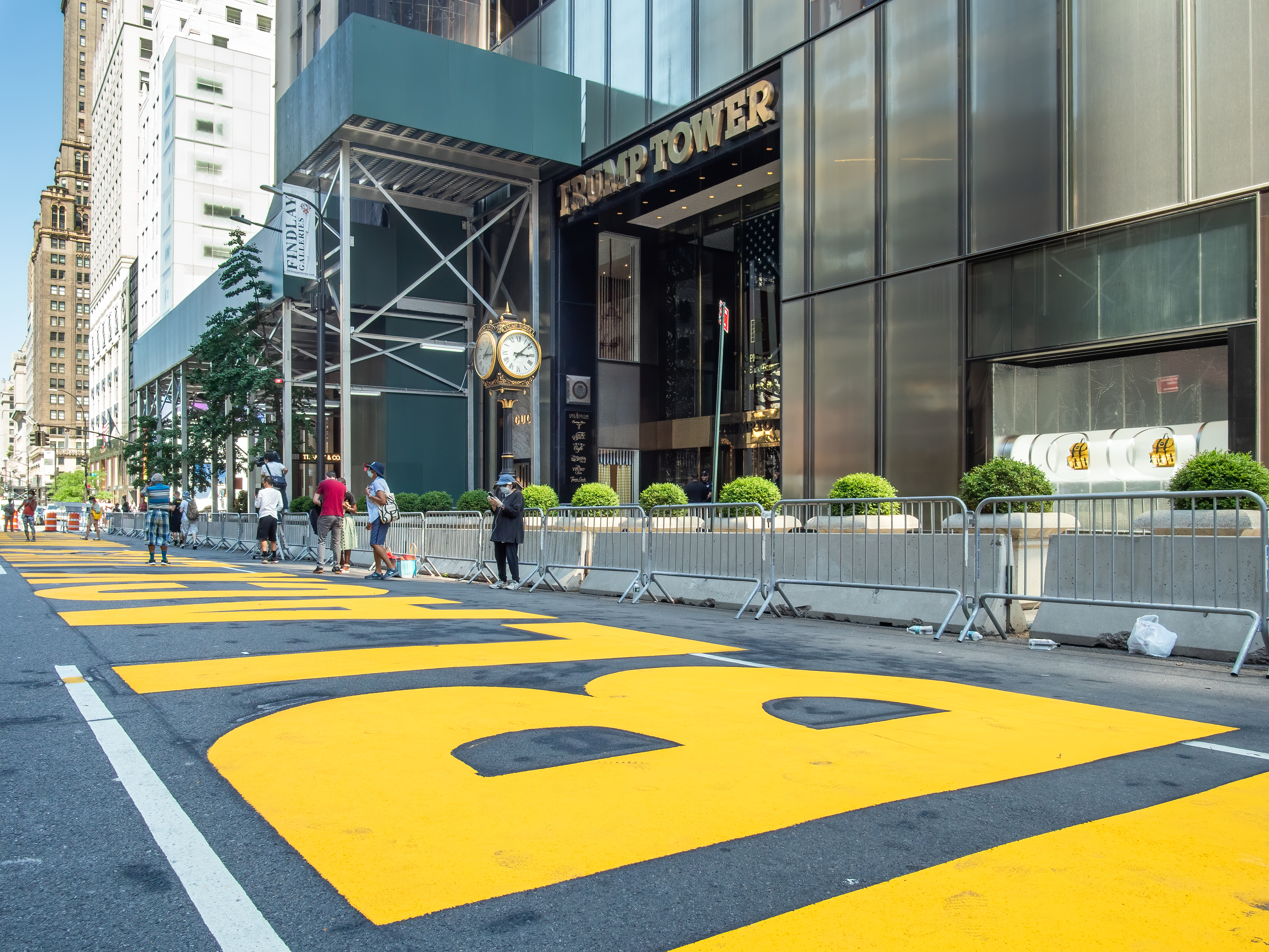
Black Lives Matter mural in front of Trump Tower in July 2020

In July 2020, activists including New York City mayor Bill de Blasio painted the words "Black Lives Matter" in giant letters on Fifth Avenue directly in front of the building. The project was announced in response to the George Floyd protests in New York City, a series of pro-police-reform protests that started after the murder of George Floyd, a black man in Minneapolis, in May 2020. Trump expressed his opposition to the mural after it was announced.

== Impact ==
=== Critical reception ===
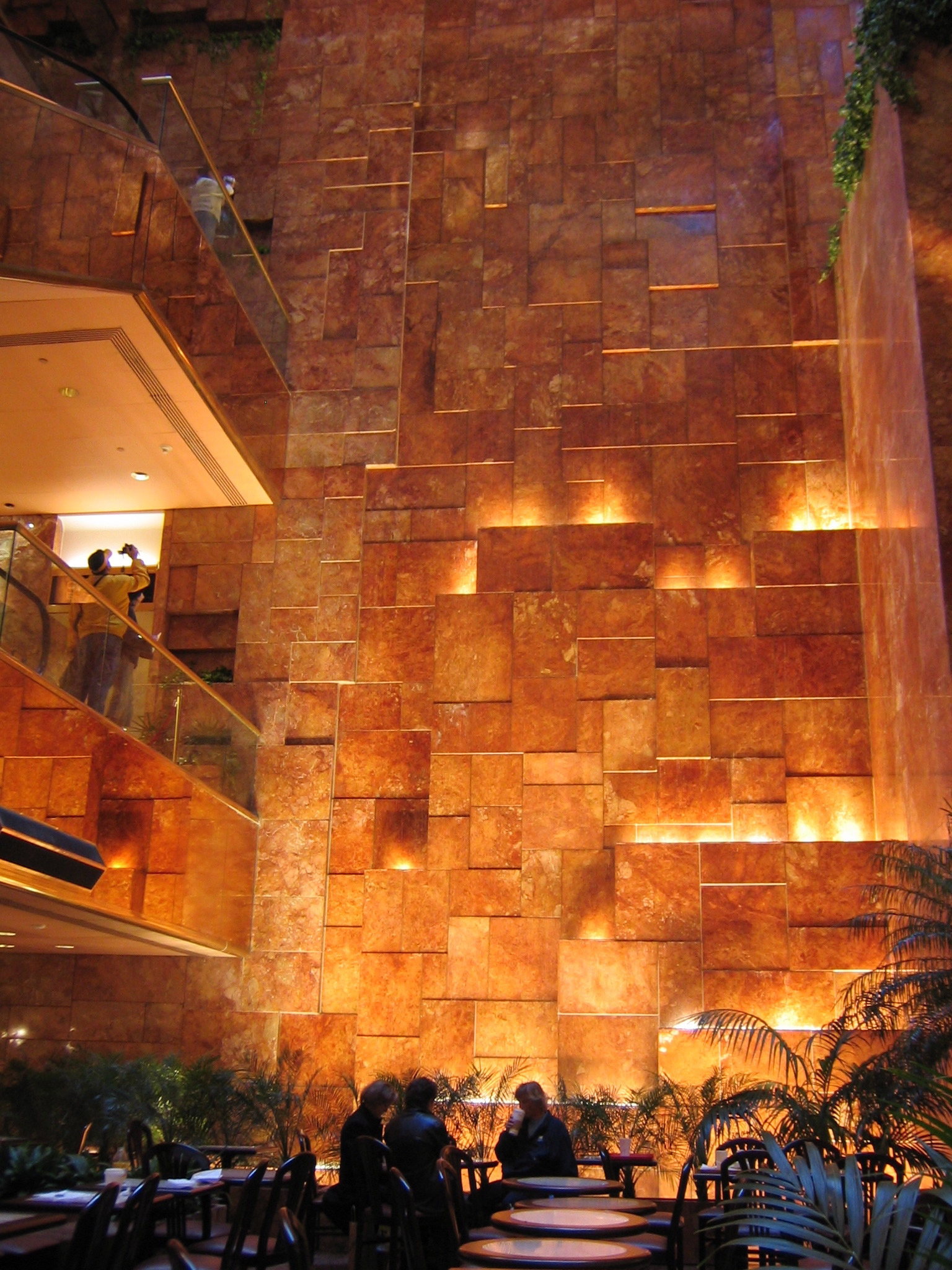
The waterfall in the atrium

In a 1982 review of the building, New York Times architecture critic Paul Goldberger contrasted the "reflective" Trump Tower with the nearby postmodern 550 Madison Avenue building. In a 1983 review just before the tower opened, Goldberger said the tower was "turning out to be a much more positive addition to the cityscape than the architectural oddsmakers would have had it". According to Goldberger, the indoor atrium might become "the most pleasant interior public space to be completed in New York in some years" because the marble and brass made it "warm, luxurious and even exhilarating", although it was "a bit too high and narrow" and with little room for crowds. However, he criticized the "hyperactive" exterior of the tower, contrasting it with Tiffany's "serene," solid facade next door, as well as the narrowness of passageways within the atrium, saying it created "little room for milling or casual strolling."

In a 1984 article, Ada Louise Huxtable, The New York Times architecture critic from 1963 to 1982, was quoted by New York Times writer William E. Geist as saying that the building was a "dramatically handsome structure." Huxtable responded that the comment had been written in 1979 about the "proposed faceted shape of the building" and that the finished tower was a "monumentally undistinguished one". She also wrote that the atrium was "an uncomfortable place, awkwardly proportioned in its narrow verticality", calling it a "pink marble maelstrom" and asking Trump to remove the quote from its wall. Geist called the tower a "Xanadu of conspicuous consumption" and described it as "preposterously lavish" and "showy, even pretentious." Architect Gregory Stanford described the atrium as "pretty horrible."

The fifth edition of the AIA Guide to New York City, published in 2010, described Trump Tower as a "fantasyland for the affluent shopper" hidden by "folded glass," with the Trump theme evident throughout the building. Comparing the building's interior design to alcoholic drink brands, the authors wrote that the design was less like a high-end "Veuve Clicquot" and more like a generic "malt liquor." Fodor's New York City 2010 described Trump Tower's "ostentatious atrium" as an example of the "unbridled luxury" of the 1980s, characterized by "expensive boutiques and gaudy brass everywhere." The tower's public atrium, along with that of Citigroup Center a few blocks away, was described as a convenient public area.

Frommer's called the tower a "bold and brassy place" whose golden sign "practically screams 'Look at me!'" Meanwhile, Insight Guides' 2016 edition mentioned Trump Tower as "worth stopping by for a glimpse of the opulence synonymous with Manhattan in the 1980s" and that viewers of The Apprentice would recognize the atrium and the waterfall.

=== In popular culture ===
Trump Tower served as the location for Wayne Enterprises in Christopher Nolan's The Dark Knight Rises. In a 2012 vlog post on the Trump Organization's YouTube channel, Trump called the film as "really terrific" and that "most importantly Trump Tower—my building—plays a role." Other films have used Trump Tower as a filming location as well. For instance, the 2010 comedy film The Other Guys contains a car chase scene that has Samuel L. Jackson's character drive his car into Trump Tower. The penthouse in Trump Tower was used as a filming location for the action film Self/less (2015).

Trump Tower, a romance novel by Jeffrey Robinson, chronicles the sexual activities of fictional characters living in the tower. News media reported on the novel's existence during the last week of the 2016 presidential campaign. The novel was never formally published but is registered as having an International Standard Book Number. For unknown reasons, some versions of the novel are advertised with Trump as the author.

Trump Tower is featured on the cover of the 1997 video game Grand Theft Auto. A fictionalized version of it, called the Cleethorpes Tower, is depicted in the 2008 sequel Grand Theft Auto IV and its episodes The Lost and Damned and The Ballad of Gay Tony.

== See also ==
- List of things named after Donald Trump
- List of residences of presidents of the United States
- Timeline of Russian interference in the 2016 United States elections
- Timeline of Russian interference in the 2016 United States elections (July 2016 – election day)
- Timeline of post-election transition following Russian interference in the 2016 United States elections
  - Trump Tower meeting, June 9, 2016
  - Mueller report
