= Stiebel =

Stiebel is a surname. Notable people with the surname include:

- George Stiebel (c.1821–1896), Jamaican trader and entrepreneur
- Joan Stiebel (1911–2007), Jewish relief worker in London
- Penelope Hunter-Stiebel (born 1946), American art curator and historian
- Victor Stiebel (1907–1976), South African-born British couturier

== See also ==
- Stiebel Eltron, German heating products company
