= John Cody (union leader) =

American labor unionist (1921–2001)

John A. Cody (June 17, 1921 – April 4, 2001) was an American union leader and racketeer from New York City. He was the president of the Teamsters union Local 282 between 1976 and 1984, during which time he utilized strikes, extortion and mafia intimidation to bend developers to his will and gained a fearsome reputation within the New York construction industry.

In 1982 Cody was convicted of labour Racketeering and Tax evasion resulting in Cody being sentenced to five years in prison.

== Early life and career ==
Cody was born in the Hells Kitchen neighborhood of Manhattan. Cody got his start in the Teamster's union as a $1-a-day trucker's helper at the age of 15. At the age of 17 he was imprisoned for armed robbery, assault, and possession of a gun. Cody served as U.S. Marine towards the end of World War II.

=== Union leader ===
During Cody's time as the President of Local 282 of the International Brotherhood of Teamsters he had a salary of $ 100,000 a year. He was considered the "construction industry's most powerful union leader". At the time Cody was so feared by construction workers that they built his beach house for him in South Hampton and provided him with chauffeurs free of charge. Cody used the mafia in New York to further intimidate developers, first working with the Gambino crime family and then Paul Castellano. Cody would kickback at least $200,000 a year to the mafia and was also convicted of providing a $2 million loan to Chicago mobsters. Cody was known for his cautious behavior, including installing anti-bugging devices in his phones and patting guests at his home for bugs. As a result, federal prosecutors described him as a tough case to crack.

Cody was responsible for delivering cement and building materials for virtually every major building site in Manhattan from the mid-1970s to the mid-'80s. Tom Galvin, who was chief operating officer of the Battery Park City Authority, the agency that oversaw the construction Gateway Plaza, said, "LeFrak didn't get around John Cody. Nobody did." (Sam LeFrak was the developer of the Gateway Plaza). It was reported that John Cody added millions of dollars to the Gateway Plaza's costs. At the work site of the AT&T Building, Cody blamed black workers for creating dangerous work conditions in order to ensure additional union members would receive jobs. He told contractors that extra union workers equipped with walkie-talkies would be required at the job site to ensure safe working conditions. Cody threatened strikes if developers did not comply with his demands, and considering the huge costs a strike would incur, developers often capitulated.

Cody was reported to have aided then real estate developer Donald Trump in building Trump Tower despite the fact that there was a city-wide teamster strike.

=== Criminal convictions ===
In 1982 Cody was convicted of labour Racketeering and Tax evasion resulting in Cody being sentenced to five years in prison. A jury found him guilty of seven of eight charges of engaging in racketeering since 1968, violating tax laws, and accepting gifts from contractors who had dealings with the union which violated Taft–Hartley Act. After his conviction, Robert Sasso the Treasurer of 282 succeeded Cody.

After his conviction for racketeering in what federal prosecutors described as a "desperate attempt" to regain power, Cody hired a former jailhouse inmate to assassinate Cody's successor Robert Sasso. The inmate was an informant for the FBI and recorded conversations about the plot, including Cody discussing " the relative merits of using explosives or a gun with a silencer," to kill Sasso. Cody went to prison for attempted murder as a result.

=== Death ===
Cody died of Alzheimer's disease in 2001, at the age of 79.
