= Barbara Res =

American engineer

Barbara A. Res
- Born: Barbara Tahan; Brooklyn, New York, U.S.
- Education: City College of New York (B.E.); Rutgers Law School (J.D.)
- Occupations: Attorney, author, engineer
- Employer: The Trump Organization
- Known for: Tower of Lies and for her work as executive vice president at The Trump Organization

Barbara A. Res is an American attorney, author, and engineer. She was an executive vice president in charge of construction at the Trump Organization and has spoken out publicly against its owner Donald Trump, particularly about his treatment of women. In October 2020, Res released her memoir, Tower of Lies: What My Eighteen Years of Working With Donald Trump Reveals About Him about her experiences at the Trump Organization.

== Early life and education ==
Barbara Res was born Barbara Tahan in Brooklyn, New York. She attended City College of New York and graduated with a degree in Electrical Engineering in 1971. In 2007, Res earned a Juris Doctor from Rutgers Law School. Res is a Licensed Professional Engineer in New York State and is a member of the New York and New Jersey bar associations.

== Career ==
Res began working in construction in 1971 and began to work for Donald Trump in a junior position during his first construction in Manhattan, the Grand Hyatt.

Res joined the Trump Organization in 1980 and then worked for Trump over the course of eighteen years as a vice president, senior vice president, and executive vice president. Res was hired by Trump to lead construction on Trump Tower as Vice President in charge of construction when she was thirty-one years old, and helped build Trump Tower between 1980 and 1984. Res was one of the first woman to oversee a major NYC construction site, and worked with Trump on some of his biggest projects, including the renovation of New York's Plaza Hotel. Michael Kruse writes for Politico Magazine that Res quit the Trump Organization after she was "unwilling any longer to take Trump’s explosive moods and turbulent treatment."

Res was selected to join the construction panel of the American Arbitration Association for arbitration and mediation in 2003. Res joined Digibuild, the creator of a unique construction management software platform built with blockchain technology as Senior Vice President. Res has publicly spoken about women in the construction business throughout the United States and in England.

== Advocacy ==
Res has spoken out publicly against Trump, particularly about his treatment of women, including in opinion articles in the New York Daily News and The Guardian, as well as interviews with CNN, Rolling Stone, The New York Times, and Rachel Maddow of MSNBC in 2016. Information provided by Res was also included in a June 2016 Atlantic story by Dan P. McAdams, a psychology professor at Northwestern University and author of the book The Strange Case of Donald J. Trump: A Psychological Reckoning.

In 2018, The Washington Post described how Res' description of her experiences at the Trump Organization offered support for Bob Woodward's book Fear and an anonymous op-ed in The New York Times that was then attributed to a senior administration official, because "Both works describe a president whose orders are not always carried out by those around him." After the announcement of the formal impeachment inquiry into Trump in 2019, Res told CNN's Brian Stelter that she believed Trump was unfit for office, and he might resign "to save face," depending on the outcome of the impeachment process. In a 2019 news analysis, The New York Times wrote that Res "sees in Ms. Pelosi a new challenge to Mr. Trump's lifelong tactics."

In April 2020, Res wrote an opinion article in the New York Daily News that recounts an experience from her work for Trump and expresses concerns about his leadership during the coronavirus pandemic. Before the November 2020 election, Res told Jane Mayer of The New Yorker that "One of the reasons [Trump]’s so crazily intent on winning is all the speculation that prosecutors will go after him," and suggested that Trump could follow through with his musing on leaving the U.S. because "he can do business from anywhere."

After the November 2020 election, Res spoke with MSNBC’s Ari Melber, suggesting Trump will "do anything" to stay in office, and both The Independent and HuffPost wrote that her comments echo an op-ed by President Trump's niece, Mary Trump, in The Guardian. People magazine also reported on Res' interview with Melber, as well as her past advocacy, and her new book, Tower of Lies. In a November 6, 2020 report by Inside Edition, Res is quoted for her opinion that Trump may leave the country after Biden's inauguration. In a Politico report published on December 1, 2020, about Trump's intention to restart foreign deals, Res is quoted for her opinion, including "There are two things that make him run — ego and money. Looking at it from the point of the money, he’s going to have people who give him money to build Trump towers." In a December 20, 2020 article titled "Is Trump Cracking Under the Weight of Losing?" in Politico Magazine, writer Michael Kruse quotes Res for her opinion, "And he's not indestructible."

== Works ==
Res is the author of the 2013 book All Alone on the 68th Floor: How One Woman Changed the Face of Construction, a self-published memoir about her experiences in the construction business, which includes descriptions of her work with Donald Trump.

In October 2020, Res released a book entitled Tower of Lies: What My Eighteen Years of Working With Donald Trump Reveals About Him. The Los Angeles Times reports that in her book, Res "recounts racist, anti-Semitic and sexist behavior, along with Trump’s ability to lie "so naturally" that "if you didn’t know the actual facts, he could slip something past you."" Newsweek, The New York Daily News, and The Times of Israel write that Res' book joins a collection of books by former Trump associates that recount their experiences. A HuffPost report on an excerpt from Tower of Lies describes Res as "a persistent thorn in her former [employer]’s side since before the 2016 election." In a review for The Berkshire Edge, Mickey Friedman writes, "Unlike so many of those who have written about President Trump, Barbara Res tells a story that is far more personal than political," and that this is why, "in many ways, this is one of the most interesting portraits of Donald Trump."

C-SPAN's Washington Journal interviewed Barbara Res to discuss Tower of Lies, in an episode scheduled to air on December 26, 2020.

== Awards and recognition ==
- Townsend Harris Medal by the City College of New York in 1991 for her role as a pioneer among women engineers
- Emily Roebling leadership award by Professional Women in Construction for her achievements in the Construction Industry
