= 45 Wine and Whiskey =

Bar in Manhattan, New York City

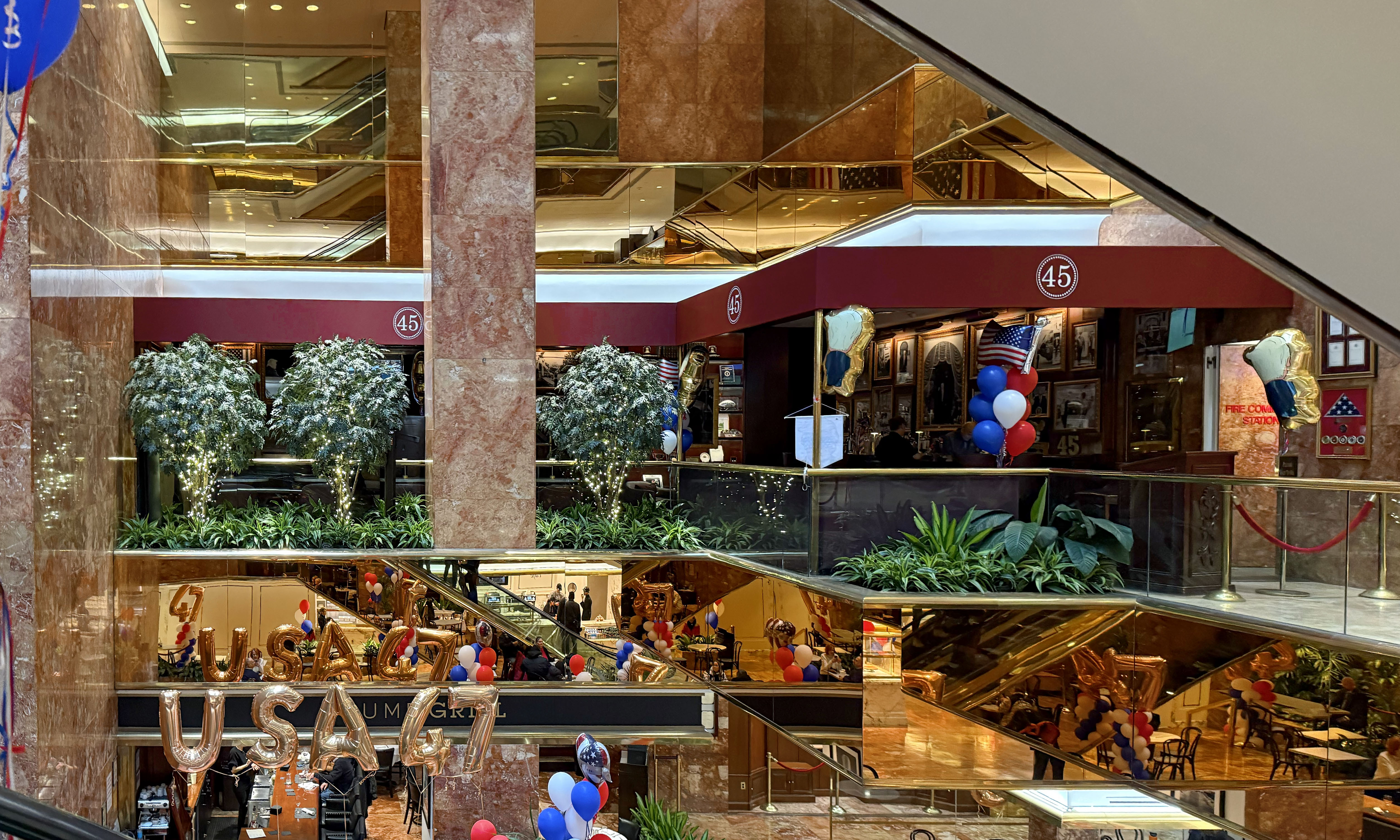
- The restaurant in 2025
- Interactive map of 45 Wine and Whiskey

Restaurant information
- Established: November 2021
- Location: 725 Fifth Avenue, New York City, New York, 10022, United States
- Coordinates: 40°45′45″N 73°58′26″W
- Website: www.trumptowerny.com/dining/midtown-bar-and-lounge-nyc

45 Wine and Whiskey is a bar and restaurant in Manhattan's Trump Tower, in the U.S. state of New York. The bar opened in November 2021.

== Description ==
The interior features gold banisters, peach marble walls, and 39 photographs of Donald Trump. The Forty Five has whiskey with syrup and bitters, and is served with two hamburgers and a Diet Coke. The Flotus is a mixture of white wine and gin. The Mar-a-Lago spritzer has wine, soda water, and grapefruit juice.
