= Trump Tower penthouse of Donald Trump =

Primary New York City residence of Trump family

Coordinates: 40°45′44″N 73°58′26″W

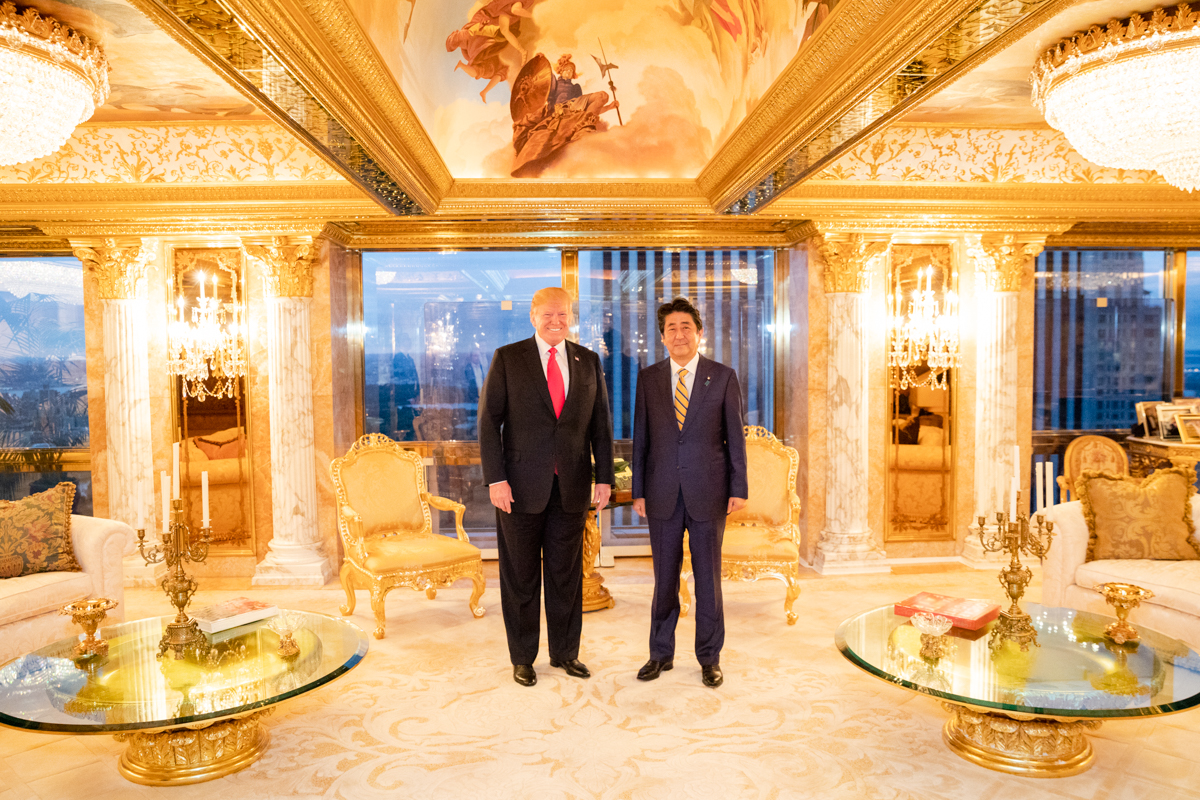
Trump and the Japanese prime minister Shinzō Abe in Trump Tower penthouse in 2018

The penthouse apartment of Donald Trump at the Trump Tower was the primary residence of Trump and his family from the tower's construction in 1983 until 2019 when Trump moved his primary residence to Mar-a-Lago. The original decorator of the apartment was Angelo Donghia; it was subsequently remodeled in gold by Henry Conversano. The stated size of the apartment has been subject to various estimates by Trump.

== History ==
The triplex apartment is located on floors 56, 57, and 58 of the Trump Tower in Manhattan. The apartment is the residence of Trump, his wife Melania, and their son Barron. The tower was their primary residence until October 2019. The Trump Organization offices are on the 25th and 26th floors, and there is a private elevator between the penthouse and Trump's office.

Trump's then-wife Ivana told Steven M.L. Aronson of Architectural Digest that adjusting to living in the newly completed penthouse was "highly stressful and taking its toll" with the 'grand showcase living' of the space and that she and Donald would retreat back to their comfortable apartment in a Trump building on Third Avenue for a couple of nights a week. Aronson found her comments "immensely sympathetic".

In a 1984 article in GQ magazine, Trump's first wife Ivana said the first floor of the penthouse had the living, dining, and entertainment rooms and kitchen; the second floor had their bedrooms and bathrooms as well as a balcony over the living room; and the third had bedrooms for the children, maids, and guests.

When Trump and Melania's son Barron was born, Ellen DeGeneres gave the Trumps a gold baby carriage with a mini crystal chandelier, and other gifts in his nursery in the apartment included a large stuffed dog from Barbara Walters and a large stuffed green frog from Gayle King.

Trump has described it as the "best apartment ever built, they say" and the "finest apartments in the top building in the best location in the hottest city in the world".

Trump has frequently shown the apartment to journalists and reporters profiling him. Trump told the Forbes reporter Dan Alexander that he "[didn't] show it to anybody" despite it having been previously visited by 60 Minutes, Architectural Digest and People magazine. The apartment was profiled in the July 1985 issue of Architectural Digest by Steven M.L. Aronson. Ivanka Trump gave a walkthrough of her disused bedroom in the 2003 documentary Born Rich.

== Design ==
=== Angelo Donghia's initial design ===
The original design for the triplex apartment was created by Angelo Donghia. Prior to his work on Trump's apartment, Donghia had decorated apartments for Ralph Lauren and Bernie Madoff. The apartment was completed on time for the opening of the Trump Tower in 1983. Donghia was given responsibility for the entire design, layout, and decoration of the apartment. It was a raw concrete shell with no windows when his work on the apartment began. Donghia's design for the apartment was approved by Ivana Trump, then Trump's wife. Ivana and Donghia's associate, Tim Macdonald, executed Donghia's designs after meeting with the building contractors. Macdonald later said that "None of those working on the project really had any interaction with Donald Trump" and that Ivana was "a fantastic manager and wonderful client". Donghia was subsequently asked by Donald Trump if he would do another project for him but Donghia said that he would only do so if he was paid the entirety of the costs up front. The project never occurred. Donghia described Trump as "[knowing] exactly who he is, and what he wants ... He has very quick judgment and a very definite attitude about what he likes. With Donald, you don't spend a lot of time wondering whether something is right or wrong — it's (a) or it's (b) and that's that. And everything you do for him has to be done 'great'".

Donghia's entrance hall to the apartment had lacquered walls with polished bronze railings and dark marble. The large living room space had "chocolate walls, bronze mirrors, and gold leaf ceiling" which created a sense of intimacy despite the massive size of the room. The living room had a crystal chandelier and a chimney framed by recessed lighting from cathode-tubes. Donghia's design was in black-and-white and brass-and-mahogany.

A profile on Donghia published in New York Times in January 1983 titled "Behind Angelo Donghia's Gray Flannel Success", led to a subsequent exchange of letters in the newspaper between the architectural firm Swanke Hayden Connell and Trump. John Peter Barie from Swanke Hayden Connell Architects (S.H.C.A.) wrote that he had personally designed all the floor plans for the units in the tower including Trump's triplex and "laid out all spatial and form relationships and established all horizontal and vertical dimensions for all three levels of the Trump triplex". Trump replied that "Numerous designers, architects and consultants were hurt" by Barie's letter and they were "overreaching in not granting Der Scutt, Angelo Donghia and others the credit which they so justly deserve".

Jesse Kornbluth wrote in a 2017 article for BuzzFeed that Donghia's designs for the apartment were a logical successor to his work at the Metropolitan Opera Club at the Metropolitan Opera House at the Lincoln Center. Donald Trump described Donghia's designs as "comfortable modernism".

Donghia learned he had AIDS shortly after finishing Trump's apartment and died two years later in 1985.

=== Gold remodeling ===
The apartment was remodeled in gold by Henry Conversano, a former nightclub singer and Pratt Institute–trained industrial designer long retained by casino impresarios; previously, Conversano designed interiors for the Golden Nugget Atlantic City casino.

The remodeling was analyzed in The Oxford Handbook of Decadence and was described by design critic Peter York as an example of 'dictator chic'. York wrote that "No matter how you looked at it, the main thing [Trump's] apartment said was, "I am tremendously rich and unthinkably powerful". This was the visual language of public, not private, space. It was the language of the Eastern European and Middle Eastern nouveau riche". York felt that Trump's style was diametrically opposed to the restrained neo-classicism of the architecture of Washington D.C. which "evoke stability and trustworthiness through their restraint" and seek to project "a message of simplicity, democracy and egalitarianism".

The gold remodeling was reportedly ordered by Trump after he saw the more lavish house of Saudi businessman Adnan Khashoggi.

== Size ==
The square footage of the apartment and the accompanying number of rooms has been subject to various estimates since its construction. In September 2015, Trump told Forbes reporter Dan Alexander that the apartment was 33,000 sq ft (3,100 m^{2}) plus roof space of 15,000 sq ft (1,400 m^{2}), making a total of 48,000 sq ft (4,500 m^{2}). Forbes subsequently estimated the size of the apartment at 30,000 sq ft (2,800 m^{2}), with a valuation of $100 million. The property records for the apartment later showed that it was 11,000 sq ft (1,000 m^{2}) in size, with an estimated value of $65 million.

Thomas Wells, who worked as a lawyer for Trump, noted that every story about the penthouse featured a different number of rooms, with 8, 16, 20 and 30 all printed. Wells asked Trump how many rooms the apartment actually had, to which Trump replied "However many they will print".

The size of the penthouse was discussed as part of the New York civil investigation of The Trump Organization. The Attorney General of New York (AG), Letitia James, cited the apartment as being reported as being 30,000 square feet (2,800 square metres); according to the New York AG it is actually about 11,000 square feet (1,000 square metres). A 2017 Forbes article supported the smaller figure and estimated the apartment's value to be less than a third of Trump's valuation of over $200 million. According to a later court filing by the AG, Trump's chief financial officer Allen Weisselberg "admitted that the apartment's value had been overstated by 'give or take' $200 million". During the trial, it surfaced that in 1994, prior to his overstatement, Trump had admitted his penthouse's smaller size.

== See also ==
- List of residences of presidents of the United States
