= Penelope Hunter-Stiebel =

American art curator and historian (born 1946)

Penelope Hunter-Stiebel (born 1946) is an American art curator and historian, who has been associated with New York's Metropolitan Museum of Art and the Portland Museum of Art.

== Early life ==
Born in 1946, Hunter-Stiebel studied at the New York University Institute of Fine Arts. She is married to Gerald Stiebel, son of the art dealer Eric Stiebel. The couple live in New Mexico.

== Career ==
Hunter-Stiebel worked as a consultant for the Metropolitan's 20th-century decorative arts collection from the early 1970s to 1983. She has been credited with reviving interest in the Metropolitan's Art Deco holdings by her authorship of an article in the museum's bulletin which drew attention to the collection. In 1979 Hunter-Stiebel was appointed associate curator of the Metropolitan museum's applied art department; she was the first permanent appointment in that department, and collected many objects of post-war design for the museum's holdings. In 1984 the property developer Donald Trump demolished the former Bonwit Teller department store on Fifth Avenue that was known for its exterior decoration. Hunter-Stiebel and the art gallery owner Robert Miller attempted to persuade Trump to donate the sculptural bronze reliefs from the building to the Metropolitan Museum of Art, but they were destroyed. Hunter-Stiebel caught a cab to the building site and attempted to pay the workmen for the sculptures, but was rebuffed. Hunter-Stiebel described the sculptures as "irreplaceable architectural documents", and described Trump as "not an esthetic person".

Hunter-Stiebel left the Metropolitan Museum to join her husband and father-in-law at the art dealers Rosenberg & Stiebel, and later returned to curatorial work for the Portland Art Museum in the 2000s. Hunter-Stiebel left the Portland Museum in 2008; purportedly over a contractual dispute. Hunter-Stiebel curated several exhibitions at the Portland Museum including shows of 18th-century French painting, collections from the Musée des Arts Décoratifs, Paris, and Amsterdam's Rijksmuseum, and from the family holdings of the Grand Duchy of Hesse.

== Bibliography ==
- The Fine Art of the Furniture Maker: Conversations with Wendell Castle, artist, and Penelope Hunter-Stiebel, curator, about selected works from the Metropolitan Museum of Art (Memorial Art Gallery of the University of Rochester, 1981, with Wendell Castle) ISBN 9780918098108
- American Glass Art; Evolution and Revolution (1982; with Paul Vickers Gardner, Paul E. Doros, and Douglas Heller)
- Elements of Style: The Art of the Bronze Mount in 18th and 19th Century France (Rosenberg & Stiebel, 1984)
- A Bronze Bestiary (Rosenberg & Stiebel, 1985)
- Menuiserie: The carved wood furniture of 18th century France (Rosenberg & Stiebel, 1986)
- William Beckman: Dossier of a Classical Woman (Stiebel Modern, 1991) ISBN 9781878799029
- Stroganoff: The Palace and Collections of a Russian Noble Family (Harry N. Abrams, 2000) ISBN 9780810941960
- Stuff of Dreams: Matieres De Reves from the Paris Muse Des Arts Decoratifs (Portland Art Museum, 2002; with Odile Nouvel-Kammerer) ISBN 9781883124144
- Hesse: A Princely German Collection (Portland Art Museum, 2005) ISBN 9781883124212
- Rembrandt and the Golden Age of Dutch Art: Treasures from the Rijksmuseum, Amsterdam (Portland Art Museum, 2007; with Ruud Priem) ISBN 9781883124236
- Rococo: The Continuing Curve, 1730-2008 (Assouline, 2008; with Sarah Coffin, Gail Davidson, and Ellen Lupton) ISBN 9780910503914

=== By others ===
- Pierre Verlet —French Furniture of the Eighteenth Century (University of Virginia Press, 1991) (trans. Penelope Hunter-Stiebel) ISBN 9780813912905
- Nicola Gordon Bowe — Harry Clarke: The Life & Work (The History Press, 2014) (foreword by Penelope Hunter-Stiebel) ISBN 9781845887421
